= Kiefer Sutherland filmography =

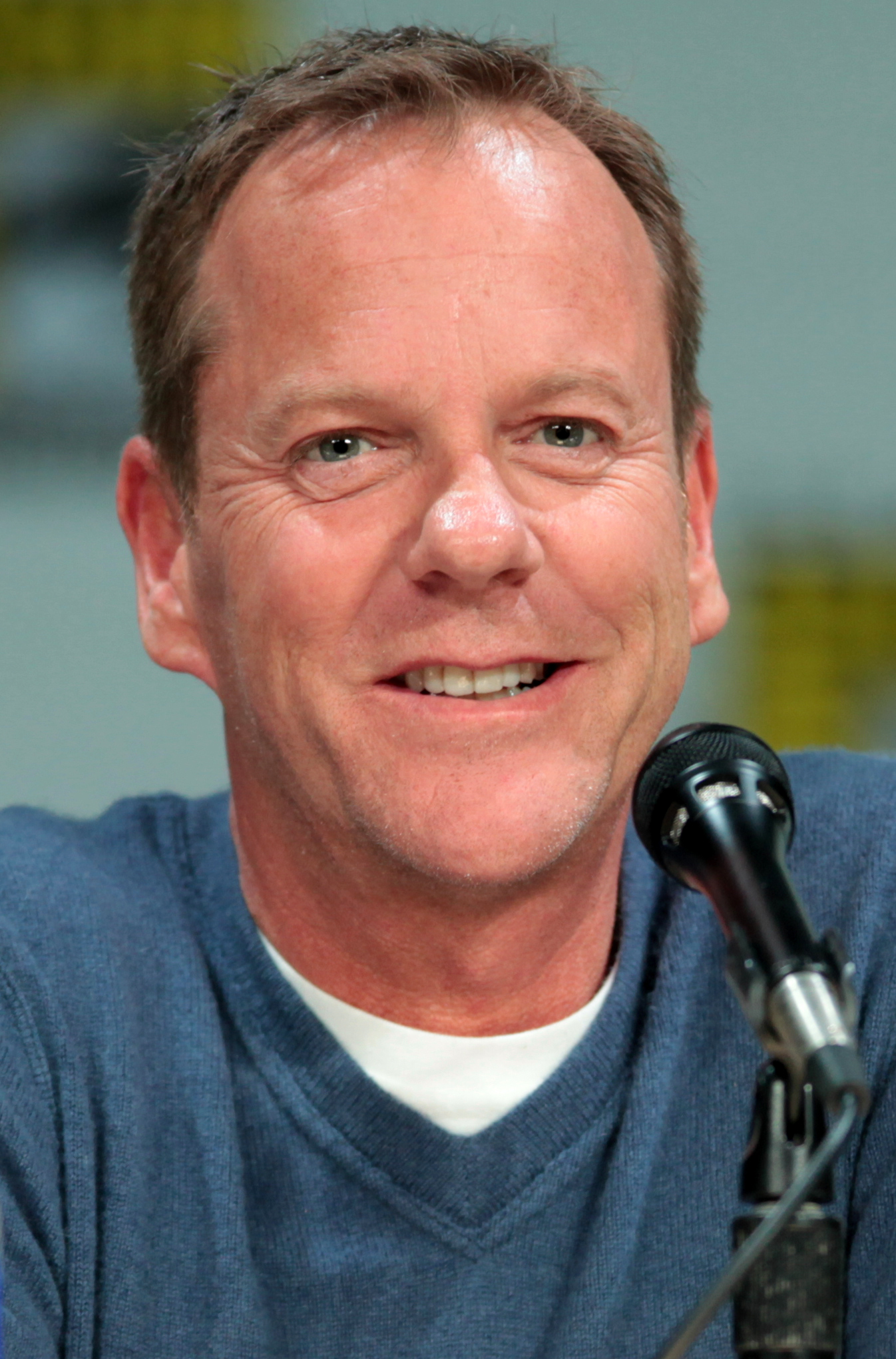
- Sutherland at the 2014 San Diego Comic-Con
- Film: 77
- Television series: 18
- Documentary: 5
- Narrating: 6
- Others: 12

Kiefer Sutherland is a Canadian actor who has starred or played prominent roles in films and television series over several decades, including Stand by Me, The Lost Boys, Young Guns, Flatliners, A Few Good Men, Dark City and most notably Jack Bauer in the Fox action series 24. He is known for his voice roles in the Call of Duty and Metal Gear video game franchises.

Sutherland's film career began in 1983 with the role of Bill Costello in Max Dugan Returns. He gained recognition for his role as Donald Campbell in The Bay Boy (1985). Sutherland's breakout role came in 1986 with Stand by Me, where he portrayed John 'Ace' Merrill, followed by The Lost Boys (1987). Throughout the late 1980s, Sutherland starred in Bright Lights, Big City (1988), Young Guns (1988), and Renegades (1989). In the 1990s, Sutherland continued to build his filmography with Young Guns II (1990), Flatliners (1990), and A Few Good Men (1992). He ventured into voice acting, with The Nutcracker Prince (1990) and Armitage III (1996). Sutherland received acclaim for his performances in Eye for an Eye (1996), A Time to Kill (1996), Dark City (1998), and Phone Booth (2002). His career included directorial efforts like Truth or Consequences, N.M. (1997) and Woman Wanted (2000). In the 2000s, Sutherland took on diverse roles in The Sentinel (2006) and Melancholia (2011). He continued to lend his voice to animated films, including The Wild (2006) and Monsters vs. Aliens (2009). Recent projects include Forsaken (2015), Flatliners (2017), and The Contractor (2022) and Father Joe (2026). Sutherland's portrayal of Lieutenant Commander Phillip Queeg in The Caine Mutiny Court-Martial (2023) garnered him a Critics' Choice Television Award nomination.

Sutherland's television career includes a mix of acting and voice work. He made his television debut in 1985 with Amazing Stories. He hosted an episode of Saturday Night Live in 1991 and directed and starred in the television film Last Light (1993). His role as Jack Bauer in the critically acclaimed series 24 (2001–2010) brought him widespread recognition and awards, including a Primetime Emmy Award for Outstanding Lead Actor in a Drama Series in 2006. Sutherland continued to make television appearances, including voice roles in The Simpsons (2006–2011) and Family Guy (2006). He starred in the Fox series Touch (2012–2013). In 2014, he reprised his role as Jack Bauer in 24: Live Another Day. Sutherland played President Thomas Kirkman in Designated Survivor (2016–2019), earning a nomination at the People's Choice Awards. He starred in the Paramount+ series Rabbit Hole (2023).

Sutherland has acted in video games. He voiced Jack Bauer in 24: The Game (2006) and Sergeant Roebuck in Call of Duty: World at War – Final Fronts (2008). His most prominent role was voicing and providing facial capture for Venom Snake / Big Boss in Metal Gear Solid V: Ground Zeroes (2014) and Metal Gear Solid V: The Phantom Pain (2015). Sutherland played Gideon Jones in the DLC "Dead of the Night" for Call of Duty: Black Ops 4 (2018).

== Film ==
| Year | Title | Role | Notes | Reference(s) |
|---|---|---|---|---|
| 1983 | Max Dugan Returns | Bill Costello | | |
| 1985 | The Bay Boy | Donald Campbell | | |
| 1986 | At Close Range | Tim | | |
| 1986 | Stand by Me | John "Ace" Merrill | | |
| 1987 | Crazy Moon | Brooks | | |
| 1987 | Promised Land | Danny "Senator" Rivers | | |
| 1987 | The Lost Boys | David Powers | | |
| 1987 | The Killing Time | The Stranger | | |
| 1988 | Bright Lights, Big City | Tad Allagash | | |
| 1988 | Young Guns | Josiah Gordon "Doc" Scurlock | | |
| 1988 | 1969 | Scott Denny | | |
| 1989 | Renegades | Detective Buster McHenry | | |
| 1990 | Young Guns II | Josiah Gordon "Doc" Scurlock | | |
| 1990 | Flatliners | Nelson Wright | | |
| 1990 | Chicago Joe and the Showgirl | Karl Hulten | | |
| 1990 | The Nutcracker Prince | Hans / The Nutcracker Prince | Voice | |
| 1990 | Flashback | Free "John" Buckner | | |
| 1992 | Article 99 | Dr. Peter Morgan | | |
| 1992 | Twin Peaks: Fire Walk with Me | FBI Agent Sam Stanley | | |
| 1992 | A Few Good Men | Lieutenant Jonathan James Kendrick | | |
| 1993 | The Vanishing | Jeff Harriman | | |
| 1993 | The Three Musketeers | Athos | | |
| 1994 | Teresa's Tattoo | Roadblock Officer | Uncredited cameo | |
| 1994 | The Cowboy Way | Sonny Gilstrap | | |
| 1994 | Felidae | "Bluebeard" | Unreleased film | |
| 1996 | Eye for an Eye | Robert Doob | | |
| 1996 | A Time to Kill | Freddie Lee Cobb | | |
| 1996 | Armitage III: Poly-Matrix | Ross Sylibus | Voice; English dub | |
| 1996 | Freeway | Bob Wolverton | | |
| 1996 | The Last Days of Frankie the Fly | Joey | | |
| 1997 | Truth or Consequences, N.M. | Curtis Freley | Also director | |
| 1998 | Dark City | Dr. Daniel P. Schreber | | |
| 1998 | A Soldier's Sweetheart | "Rat" Kiley | | |
| 1998 | Break Up | Officer John Box | | |
| 1998 | Ground Control | Jack Harris | | |
| 2000 | After Alice | Detective Michael "Mick" Hayden | | |
| 2000 | Beat | William S. Burroughs | | |
| 2000 | Woman Wanted | Wendell Goddard | Also director | |
| 2000 | Picking Up the Pieces | Officer Bobo | | |
| 2000 | The Right Temptation | Michael Farrow-Smith | | |
| 2001 | Cowboy Up | Hank Braxton | | |
| 2001 | To End All Wars | Lieutenant Jim Reardon | | |
| 2002 | Dead Heat | Albert Paul "Pally" LaMarr | | |
| 2002 | Desert Saints | Arthur Banks | | |
| 2002 | Behind the Red Door | Roy Haddad | | |
| 2002 | Phone Booth | The Caller | | |
| 2003 | The Land Before Time X: The Great Longneck Migration | Bron | Voice; Direct-to-DVD | |
| 2003 | Paradise Found | Paul Gauguin | | |
| 2004 | Taking Lives | Christopher Hart | | |
| 2004 | NASCAR 3D: The IMAX Experience | The Narrator | Voice; Documentary | |
| 2004 | Jiminy Glick in Lalawood | Himself | Cameo | |
| 2005 | River Queen | Doyle | | |
| 2006 | The Wild | Samson | Voice | |
| 2006 | The Sentinel | Secret Service Agent David Breckinridge | | |
| 2008 | Dragonlance: Dragons of Autumn Twilight | Raistlin Majere | Voice | |
| 2008 | Mirrors | Ben Carson | | |
| 2009 | Monsters vs. Aliens | General Warren R. Monger | Voice | |
| 2010 | Twelve | The Narrator | | |
| 2010 | Marmaduke | Bosco | Voice | |
| 2011 | Melancholia | John | | |
| 2012 | The Reluctant Fundamentalist | Jim Cross | | |
| 2014 | Pompeii | Senator Quintus Attius Corvus | | |
| 2015 | Forsaken | John Henry Clayton | | |
| 2016 | Zoolander 2 | Himself | Cameo | |
| 2017 | Where Is Kyra? | Doug | | |
| 2017 | Flatliners | Dr. Barry Wolfson | | |
| 2022 | The Contractor | Rusty Jennings | | |
| 2023 | They Cloned Tyrone | Nixon | | |
| 2023 | The Caine Mutiny Court-Martial | Lieutenant Commander Queeg | | |
| 2024 | Juror #2 | Larry Lasker | | |
| 2025 | Stone Cold Fox | Sergeant Billy Breaker | | |
| 2025 | Tinsel Town | Bradley Mack | | |
| 2026 | Brothers Under Fire | Captain Jordan Wright | | |
| TBA | Father Joe | Father Joe | Filming | |
| TBA | Copperhead † | —N/a | Filming | |

== Television ==
| Year | Title | Role | Notes | Reference(s) |
|---|---|---|---|---|
| 1985 | Amazing Stories | "Static" | Episode: "The Mission" | |
| 1986 | Brotherhood of Justice | Victor Parks | Television film | |
| 1986 | Trapped in Silence | Kevin Richter | Television film | |
| 1991 | Saturday Night Live | Himself (host) | Episode: "Kiefer Sutherland/Skid Row" | |
| 1993 | Last Light | "Denver" Bayliss | Television film; also director | |
| 1995 | Fallen Angels | Matt Cordell | Episode: "Love and Blood"; also director | |
| 1996 | Duke of Groove | The Host | Short film | |
| 1999 | Watership Down | Hickory | Voice; 3 episodes | |
| 1999 | L.A. Confidential | Detective Jack Vincennes | Unreleased pilot | |
| 2001–2010 | 24 | Jack Bauer | Lead role; 192 episodes; also executive producer | |
| 2005 | The Flight That Fought Back | The Narrator | Voice; Documentary | |
| 2006–2011 | The Simpsons | The Colonel / Jack Bauer / Wayne | Voices; 3 episodes | |
| 2006 | I Trust You to Kill Me | Himself | Documentary | |
| 2006 | Family Guy | The Narrator (Jack Bauer) | Voice; Episode: "Stu and Stewie's Excellent Adventure" | |
| 2008 | Corner Gas | Himself | Episode: "Final Countdown" | |
| 2008 | 24: Redemption | Jack Bauer | Television film; also executive producer | |
| 2009 | B.O.B's Big Break | General Warren R. Monger | Voice; Short film | |
| 2009 | Monsters vs. Aliens: Mutant Pumpkins from Outer Space | General Warren R. Monger | Voice; Television special | |
| 2011 | The Confession | The Confessor | Lead role; 10 episodes; also executive producer | |
| 2011 | Night of the Living Carrots | General Warren R. Monger | Voice; Short film | |
| 2012–2013 | Touch | Martin Bohm | Lead role; 26 episodes; also executive producer | |
| 2014 | 24: Live Another Day | Jack Bauer | Lead role; 12 episodes; also executive producer | |
| 2014 | Playhouse Presents: Marked | James Dempsey | Television film | |
| 2015 | Rammstein in Amerika | Himself | Documentary | |
| 2015 | Keeping Canada Alive | The Narrator | Voice; 6 episodes | |
| 2016–2019 | Designated Survivor | President Thomas Adam “Tom” Kirkman | Lead role; 53 episodes; also executive producer | |
| 2019 | Last Week Tonight with John Oliver | Himself | Episode: "Compounding Pharmacies" | |
| 2020 | The Fugitive | Detective Clay Bryce | Main cast | |
| 2020 | Creepshow | Richard Pine | Voice; Episode: "Survivor Type/Twittering from the Circus of the Dead" | |
| 2022 | The First Lady | President Franklin D. Roosevelt | 10 episodes | |
| 2023 | Rabbit Hole | John Weir | Lead role; 8 episodes; also executive producer | |
| 2023 | John Lennon: Murder Without a Trial | The Narrator | Voice; Docuseries | |

== Video games ==
| Year | Title | Role | Notes | Reference(s) |
|---|---|---|---|---|
| 2006 | 24: The Game | Jack Bauer | | |
| 2008 | Call of Duty: World at War – Final Fronts | Sergeant Roebuck | PS2 counterpart to World at War | |
| 2008 | Call of Duty: World at War | Sergeant Roebuck | | |
| 2014 | Metal Gear Solid V: Ground Zeroes | Venom Snake / Big Boss | Also facial capture; Role billed simply as "Snake" | |
| 2015 | Metal Gear Solid V: The Phantom Pain | Venom Snake / Big Boss | Also facial capture; Role billed simply as "Snake" | |
| 2018 | Metal Gear Survive | Venom Snake / Big Boss | Also facial capture; Role billed simply as "Snake" | |
| 2018 | Call of Duty: Black Ops 4 | Gideon Jones | DLC "Dead of the Night" | |

== Music videos ==
| Year | Title | Artist(s) | Role | Notes | Ref. |
|---|---|---|---|---|---|
| 2004 | "Don't Wanna Think About You" (Director's Cut version) | Simple Plan | Narrator | Voice | |
| 2005 | "The Longest Day (Remix)" | Armin Van Buuren | Jack Bauer | Archival footage | |

== See also ==
- List of awards and nominations received by Kiefer Sutherland
