= Metal Gear Survive =

2018 video game

- Developer: Konami Digital Entertainment
- Publisher: Konami
- Director: Yota Tsutsumizaki
- Producers: Yuji Korekado; Noriaki Okamura
- Designers: Yota Tsutsumizaki; Yuji Kaine; Yu Sahara
- Programmer: Kazuhide Hatsuyama
- Artists: Mineshi Kimura; Ikuya Nakamura
- Writers: Ryo Yoshigami; Gakuto Mikumo; Mikagami Ltd.; Toshiki Kitamura; Yota Tsutsumizaki
- Composers: Haruna Kubo; Takanori Kaneko; Pedro Avelar; Karin Nakano
- Series: Metal Gear
- Engine: Fox Engine
- Platforms: PlayStation 4; Windows; Xbox One
- Release: NA: February 20, 2018; JP: February 21, 2018; PAL: February 22, 2018
- Genre: Survival
- Modes: Single-player, multiplayer

Metal Gear Survive is a 2018 survival game developed by Konami Digital Entertainment and published by Konami. The game was released for PlayStation 4, Windows, and Xbox One in February 2018. It is the first Metal Gear game to be developed following the series' creator Hideo Kojima's departure from Konami in late 2015, and the first since 1990's Snake's Revenge to be made without Kojima's input. Survive takes place between the events of Metal Gear Solid V: Ground Zeroes and Metal Gear Solid V: The Phantom Pain, and follows the Captain, an MSF soldier who enters a parallel dimension and establishes a local command center to unravel the mysteries of a strange virus that turns people into zombie-like creatures.

Pre-release reception of Metal Gear Survive was generally negative, in response to its design and recent business decisions from Konami. Upon release, the game received mixed reviews from critics. Due to its low sales within the Metal Gear series, the game was considered to have underperformed commercially.

== Gameplay ==
Metal Gear Survive is a survival action-adventure game with tower defense elements and minor stealth mechanics, played from a third-person perspective. It features a cooperative multiplayer mode, in which the player can be joined by up to three other players to complete missions.

A large portion of the gameplay consists of the player exploring the world which is mostly covered by "The Dust", a mysterious toxic cloud that obstructs vision, disables the in-game map, and requires the player to monitor their oxygen level. Players venture out to gather resources such as food and crafting materials as well as to activate the various portal generators scattered throughout the map. These generators serve as the game's fast-travel system and are each unlocked by completing a tower-defence segment. Metal Gear Survive tasks players with managing thirst and hunger by scavenging for water and hunting animals for food. Players can then return to base camp in order to cook food and later purify water for safe drinking. There is also an injury system, which requires players to use different medical supplies to heal ailments such as bleeding or food poisoning.

The main enemies of Survive are crystalline zombie-like creatures called "Wanderers", with many variants introduced as the story progresses. The enemies in Survive can be overcome using either stealth or a large variety of weapons and gadgets earned gradually through finding crafting recipes or broken weapons. Players begin with access to melee weapons such as spears, machetes, and shock-batons. Eventually, bows with several kinds of arrows and firearms such as pistols, shotguns, and sniper rifles are acquired. Due to the difficulty of attacking enemies head-on, players are encouraged to use a device that allows them to erect various fences, barricades and other structures. Available gadgets include grenades, Molotov cocktails, decoys, automated gun turrets, and a plethora of traps. Killing enemies earns players "Kuban Energy", the game's currency that can be used to level up and acquire new skills. After completing the main story, four additional "sub-classes" are unlocked which have their own set of skills gained by leveling up. Class skills range from straight stat bonuses, special attacks, mobility skills, and even stealth camouflage.

Players are able to upgrade their base camp by building defences, advanced crafting stations, farms, animal cages, and rainwater collectors. Other survivors can be rescued from The Dust to provide the base camp with support staff. Base staff can also be organized into an exploration team and sent out to automatically acquire resources. Eventually, players can initiate a tower defence segment at base camp, allowing them to defend against attacks and earn rewards. Players are able to purchase "Survive Coins" which can be used to unlock various features such as a resource booster, base defender, emotes, additional exploration teams and additional load-out slots beyond the initial four. Players can unlock character slots which act as the game's New Game Plus mode. Survive Coins can be earned as in-game rewards and login bonuses as well.

== Plot ==
Following the Ground Zeroes Incident, the surviving MSF members bury their dead, aided by the UN. A UN member takes the body of a soldier, who had avoided being sucked into a wormhole that had opened above Mother Base shortly after the incident but had severed their arm when it closed.

Months later, the soldier awakens in a Wardenclyffe Section facility, a government research group investigating organisms and wormholes. The UN member, Goodluck, a chief researcher, enlists the soldier to enter a wormhole to Dite, another dimension. The soldier was chosen due to the Mother Base wormhole infecting him with an organism from Dite, restoring their arm but putting them at risk of becoming a zombie-like Wanderer. Goodluck dubs the soldier "Captain", and instructs them to find a cure and to rescue others transported to Dite through wormholes.

In Dite, the Captain makes their way to Base Camp, allying with Reeve, an XOF soldier sucked into the Mother Base wormhole. They find Base Camp abandoned except for Virgil AT-9, an artificial intelligence from the Charon Corps, an investigation team previously sent to Dite. Following an emergency shutdown upon their disappearance, Virgil remained dormant and its memory was partially lost. The Captain rescues several human survivors, including a boy called Chris.

Virgil eventually generates a wormhole to transport the group back to Earth, but cannot maintain it without Iris, a source of energy. They are contacted by Joseph Gruen, head of Wardenclyffe Section, claiming that Goodluck acted against orders in orchestrating the Captain's mission, before committing suicide. A black box within Virgil supports this, but Gruen vows to bring the group home. With enough Iris energy, the wormhole is opened but Gruen demands maximum energy output, attracting the Lord of Dust, a huge creature. The group is forced to enter and close the wormhole before it can follow. They are transported to a forested area of Dite instead of Earth and deduce Gruen desired the Lord of Dust to use for its vast source of energy. Goodluck instructs them to find a weapon to destroy the creature.

The Captain rescues an MSF soldier, Seth, from a Corps survivor, Dan. The group assumes Dan caused the Corps' disappearance. The Captain locates the weapon, a Metal Gear, but is confronted by Dan, who allies himself with the group. Seth betrays them, revealing that after being sucked into the Mother Base wormhole, he was taken in by the Charon Corps. He then allowed himself to become infected by the Dust, causing their dissolution. Seth transforms into a Wanderer, forcing the Captain to kill him.

Virgil reveals that he had become infected whilst Seth was with the Corps and quarantined its programming with the emergency shutdown. However, contact with Seth reversed these countermeasures, giving Virgil access to its data. He reveals that Dite is Earth in the 22nd century, caused by the Lord of Dust. Formed from energy and self-replicating nanomachines, the Lord of Dust feeds off of Iris energy and creates wormholes to transport matter to consume. Once Dite is ravaged, the Lord of Dust transports itself back in time to start the process again, causing a time loop.

Securing the Metal Gear, the group remains to destroy the Lord of Dust, but Chris is chosen to be the one to return to Earth. Attracting the Lord of Dust, the survivors use the Metal Gear to trap it, while Chris goes through the wormhole, promising to rescue them. From here, the story has two endings depending on the player's actions. If the player follows Chris, the Captain abandons the survivors and goes through the wormhole. The Lord of Dust escapes the trap and the remaining survivors are presumed dead. The Captain re-emerges in a desert dressed in their MSF uniform, picks up a photograph that appeared next to them, and wanders off. (Note: It is implied that the desert is Afghanistan and that the Captain becomes one of the wandering Mother Base soldiers, as depicted in Metal Gear Solid V: The Phantom Pain.) If the player stays, the Captain fires on the Lord of Dust using the Metal Gear, but only maims it before it reforms. A final message from Goodluck explains that he failed them; he is revealed to be Chris, having gone through the wormhole and ending up in 1943. Having worked his way into Wardenclyffe Section, he made his recordings for the Charon Corps and potential survivors to receive in the hope they could destroy the Lord of Dust.

Having no notion of death, the Lord of Dust is unable to be killed. Virgil enters the creature and introduces it to the concept, having created its own understanding from experience. The Captain uses the Metal Gear to destroy the Lord of Dust.

An after-credits scene shows a damaged Virgil launching from the Lord of Dust's body and returning to Base Camp, explaining to the Captain that it is still functional and will be able to continue assisting them in their mission.

In an alternate timeline, Gruen reprimands Goodluck for his mistake that the next wormhole was predicted to open above Mother Base. Goodluck deduces that the survivors have destroyed the Lord of Dust and reaffirms his vows to bring them home.

== Development ==
Metal Gear Survive was announced on 16 August 2016 during Gamescom 2016. It was not the first time the concept of a zombie game was toyed with, as Hideo Kojima said on 29 April 2013 that he always wanted to make one during Metal Gear Solid V's development, and Kojima reportedly requested to Platinum Games that the sequel to Metal Gear Rising: Revengeance have Gray Fox fighting against nanomachine-empowered zombies. The game's development was hinted at on 17 December 2015, when Konami started recruiting for a new Metal Gear development staff. The game uses the Fox Engine.

Konami Europe president Tomotada Tashiro described Metal Gear Survive as a "fresh take on the series' famed stealth elements", with a "unique co-op setting that is designed for a truly engrossing multiplayer experience."

In an interview with Dengeki PlayStation, the development staff stated that the player is able to customize their character, use several weapons, and develop their own equipment to suit their play style. They also stated that while it is possible to stealthily maneuver around enemies when playing solo, it is much more difficult taking on waves of them compared to co-op play.

At Tokyo Game Show (TGS) in September 2016, a demo revealed that the Fulton Cannon would make an appearance. The player can optionally retrieve the creatures for resource building, acquire resource building, heal themselves on the main menu, and the player can develop various things from collected resources, from defensive measures to offensive measures. The players can also split up.

During a stage presentation at TGS 2016, Hideo Kojima was asked if he had anything to do with Metal Gear Survive. He stated that the game had "nothing to do with [him]", the Metal Gear series is about "political fiction and espionage", and zombies do not fit into his vision of the series, despite his previous remarks concerning a sequel to Metal Gear Rising: Revengeance with zombies. Yoji Shinkawa also stated that he was not involved with the game. He jokingly said that Metal Gear Survive would even have mechs if he worked on it.

Metal Gear Survive was released on 20 February 2018 in North America, 21 February 2018 in Japan, and 22 February 2018 in Europe, Australia and New Zealand.

== Reception ==
Reception

Aggregate score
Aggregator	Score
Metacritic	(PC) 54/100 (PS4) 60/100 (XONE) 62/100

Review scores
Publication	Score
Destructoid	5/10
Electronic Gaming Monthly	7/10
Famitsu	34/40
Game Informer	6/10
GameRevolution	4/5
GameSpot	5/10
Giant Bomb	2/5
IGN	6.5/10
PC Gamer (UK)	59/100
Polygon	5.5/10

=== Pre-release ===
Metal Gear Survive received a generally negative response following its announcement, in part due to the controversies surrounding Konami's recent business decisions and Kojima's departure from the company. Complaints focused on the game's genre and theme (being branded as "generic" as it revolved around fighting zombie-like enemies through co-op and multiplayer), recycled assets from Metal Gear Solid V, microtransactions, constant internet connection requirement and the departure from the general feel of previous Metal Gear games.

=== Critical reception ===
Metal Gear Survive received "mixed or average" reviews from critics, according to review aggregator website Metacritic.

=== Sales ===
In Japan, the PlayStation 4 version of Metal Gear Survive sold 31,359 units within its first week on sale, placing it at number three on the all format sales chart, and number one on the digital sales charts. In the United Kingdom, the game debuted at sixth place in the all format sales chart, selling 85% fewer units than Metal Gear Rising: Revengeance, and 95% fewer units than Metal Gear Solid V: The Phantom Pain.

As of 2018, Konami's earnings report did not mention Survive's total sales, unlike the previous entries in the series and other games made by the company. Critics ultimately deemed the game as having underperformed in sales.
