= Pro Evolution Soccer 2017 =

2016 video game

- European PlayStation 4 cover featuring FC Barcelona players (from left to right: Neymar, Lionel Messi, Luis Suárez, Ivan Rakitić and Gerard Piqué)
- Developer: PES Productions
- Publisher: Konami
- Director: Yoshikatsu Ogihara
- Series: Pro Evolution Soccer
- Engine: Fox Engine; Havok (physics engine) (Android, iOS)
- Platforms: Microsoft Windows; PlayStation 3 PlayStation 4 Xbox 360; Xbox One; Android iOS
- Release: NA: September 13, 2016; EU: September 15, 2016; JP: September 15, 2016
- Genre: Sports
- Modes: Single-player, multiplayer

Pro Evolution Soccer 2017 (officially abbreviated as PES 2017, also known in some Asian countries as Winning Eleven 2017) is a sports video game developed by PES Productions and published by Konami for Microsoft Windows, PlayStation 3, PlayStation 4, Xbox 360, Xbox One, Android and iOS. The game is the 16th installment in the Pro Evolution Soccer series. It was released in September 2016 and is compatible with PS4 Pro console.

Konami partnered with FC Barcelona, Liverpool F.C., Borussia Dortmund and Club Atlético River Plate which will include recreation of the official kits, player faces, club logos and stadia among other exclusive content. Features include improved passing, Real Touch ball control, and improved goal tending technique. It includes fully licensed Arsenal, Atletico Madrid and Barcelona teams. The cover of the game features Barcelona players Neymar, Lionel Messi, Luis Suárez, Ivan Rakitić and Gerard Piqué, as well as the team's home stadium Camp Nou beneath the UEFA Champions League starball design with an Adidas Finale football on the pitch.

The game was positively reviewed upon launch, with critics describing the game as one of the best Pro Evolution Soccer games to date, and a refinement of its predecessor, Pro Evolution Soccer 2016. PES 2017 was succeeded by Pro Evolution Soccer 2018.

== Adaptive AI ==
PES 2017 features adaptive artificial intelligence (AI), which makes the AI adapt to gameplay styles of each player. This allows the game to automatically change AI's tactics and strategic plans, according to the player's strategic preference and performance in matches.

== Edit and data sharing ==
At Electronic Entertainment Expo 2016 it was announced that edit data can now be transferred between PS4 consoles via USB. Data sharing is also compatible across multiple regions, allowing European, US and Asian users to all share data among each other. Kits and created teams/players can be obtained with far more ease than in previous versions of PES, through "option files" - files that, once uploaded to the game, automatically change/update players, kits and teams.

== Match analysis ==
Match analysis (also known as Versus data) is available in offline games between friends and in online myClub matches. Players are able to analyze opponent's playing traits (counterattack/possession, short/long pass, etc.), favorite moves and the areas on the pitch they use to attack the most.

== Official partnerships ==
PES 2017 is the first game in the series that features Konami's new partnership with FC Barcelona. Premier League teams Arsenal F.C. and Liverpool are licensed, while Liverpool even entered into official partnership with Konami. However, PES 2017 no longer has some big teams that were licensed in PES 2016, most notably Real Madrid, Bayern Munich, Manchester United, Juventus and Porto.

=== Partnership with FC Barcelona ===
On 26 July 2016, Konami Digital Entertainment Co. Ltd. announced an official partnership with FC Barcelona that would be effective across their titles for 3 years saying "The FCB signature style Tiki-Taka, the powerful "hymno", the Barcelona classic kit data release, and Legend player appearances are some of the things Konami are planning to bring into the game to provide the best experience to the fans. Customers are entitled to sign a Barcelona player who can be used in the widely popular PES mode myClub by pre-ordering the digital download version of PES 2017 through the PlayStation®Store." Exclusive use of the Camp Nou is reserved to the Pro Evolution Soccer titles for the duration of the licence.

=== Partnership with Liverpool F.C. ===
On 16 August 2016, Konami Digital Entertainment Co. Ltd. announced an official partnership with Liverpool F.C. Through the agreement PES 2017 includes content such as recreation of the official kit, player faces and Liverpool's home ground Anfield among other content. Konami announced the deal also stating that "This title's core concept "Control Reality", makes it possible to reproduce Liverpool's compact and speedy game flow. With the new function "Advanced Instruction", Liverpool's playing style of multiple players to retrieve the ball from a high position, "Gegenpress", adopted by manager Jürgen Klopp, is reproduced within the game. The most notable difference to this licence however is that unlike the Barcelona deal, the Anfield stadium will not be exclusive to the Pro Evolution Soccer series.

=== Partnership with Borussia Dortmund ===
On 17 August 2016, at the annual gaming expo Gamescom, it was announced that Konami Digital Entertainment Co. Ltd. had agreed a 3rd premium partnership, this time with Borussia Dortmund. An official announcement stated that "Through this agreement, PES 2017 [...] will include the downloadable data of the team's home stadium "Signal Iduna Park". These new implementations will richen to fully experience "BV Borussia 09 Dortmund"."

=== Partnership with River Plate ===
On 26 August 2016, Konami Digital Entertainment Co. Ltd. announced an official partnership with Club Atlético River Plate. An announcement on the Konami website stated "Konami Digital Entertainment Co., Ltd. proudly announces that it has signed an official partnership with the renowned Argentine soccer club, Club Atlético River Plate, which will be seen across PES titles and related mobile games". A statement by the Argentinian club stated "PES has been home to some of the most heralded football franchises in the world so we are excited to partner with KONAMI. We look forward to working closely with them to extend our team's unique playing style and abilities to a wider audience."

=== Partnership with the Brazilian Football Confederation ===
An announcement of an exclusive partnership with the Brazilian Football Confederation was made on 29 August 2016. Through this agreement, players of the PES 2017 game will have exclusive access to the domestic league of Brazil. This will also enable PES 2017 to have all 20 teams of the Brazilian league fully licensed.

=== Partnerships with Red Bull Brasil, SC Corinthians Paulista and CR Flamengo ===
In a hat-trick of announcements, Konami Digital Entertainment Co. Ltd. revealed exclusive licences with three of Brazil's top teams. Statements from the website indicated that "Through this agreement, PES 2017 [...] will include the club's traditional red and black bordered kit and the team's home stadium "Estádio do Maracanã". These new implementations will help enrich the experience of playing with CR Flamengo." for the CR Flamengo. Of the SC Corinithians deal, Konami stated "Corinthians is a renowned Brazilian soccer club founded in 1910. It has been champion of Brazil's domestic league Campeonato Brasileiro six times, and has won many other domestic and international titles. Through this agreement, PES 2017 [...] will include the club's kit and its home stadium "Arena Corinthians". Many other measures are planned to enrich the experience of "Corinthians", so please enjoy the authentic feel of the gameplay, just like the club's high abilities." As for the third partnership agreement with Red Bull Brasil, Konami revealed "Konami Digital Entertainment Co., Ltd. proudly announces that it has signed an Exclusive Partnership contract with the Brazilian soccer club, Red Bull Brasil. Red Bull Brasil was founded in 2007, starting in the fourth level of Campeonato Paulista, a soccer league in São Paulo. The club has made its way up in just nine years, and now plays in the top league. The club is attracting the attention of many soccer fans in Brazil, and is rapidly increasing the number of fans."

== Commentary ==
Peter Drury and Jim Beglin provide English commentary. PES 2017 includes a new technical innovation in the form of audio concatenation, the process by which individual units are linked to create a fluid, more natural sounding commentary. Milton Leite and Mauro Beting will provide Brazilian Portuguese commentary. Jon Kabira and Tsuyoshi Kitazawa remain as commentators for the Japanese version. Cantonese and Mandarin commentary is added for the first time in this game. Vince Ka Him Ng and Keyman Ma provide Cantonese commentary, while Wang Tao and Miao Kun cover Mandarin commentary. Fernando Niembro and Mariano Closs cover Argentine Spanish commentary.

== Reception ==
Reception

Aggregate score
Aggregator	Score
Metacritic	(PS4) 85/100 (XONE) 87/100 (PC) 69/100 (iOS) 81/100

Review scores
Publication	Score
Game Informer	9.25/10
GameRevolution	4.5/5
GameSpot	8/10
GamesRadar+	4.5/5
IGN	9.5/10

Pro Evolution Soccer 2017 received positive reviews from critics. The aggregator site Metacritic gave a score of 85/100 for the PlayStation 4 based on 62 reviews and 87/100 for the Xbox One based on 12 reviews. The PC version of the game has received mixed reviews from reviewers, with a score of 69/100 on Metacritic.

GamesRadar scored PES 2017 with a positive 4.5/5, stating that it "looks and feels like the real thing" and also go on to mention that this title restores Konami's series back to its former glory.

Gamereactor gave Konami's latest football title a 9/10, commenting on its smooth visuals and animations with the game being "pleasing and rewarding" in its approach to offence and defense. They also mention that the overall user-interface has improved.

Digital Spy's reviewer Sam Loveridge rates PES 2017 at 4.5/5, saying that the game's realism has really been ramped up, but also pointing out that there are hardly new features to the game when compared to its predecessor.

PC Gamer gave a lukewarm 71 verdict considering it "another inter-generational hybrid that looks more like the Xbox 360 than the Xbox One game. It's good—brilliant at times—but that's simply not good enough." The review concludes "A very good football game, but why are we being fobbed off with a console-light experience?", considering Konami to have given a below par port of the game.

== Awards ==
List of awards and nominations
Award	Category	Result	Ref.
E3 Games Critics Award	Best Sports Game	Nominated	
Gamescom Awards 2016	Best Sports Game	Nominated	
The Game Awards 2016	Best Sports/Racing Game	Nominated	
