= Quiet (Metal Gear) =

Fictional character from the Metal Gear series

- Metal Gear character
- Quiet from Metal Gear Solid V: The Phantom Pain
- First game: Metal Gear Solid V: The Phantom Pain (2015)
- Created by: Hideo Kojima
- Designed by: Yoji Shinkawa
- Voiced by: Stefanie Joosten
- Motion capture: Stefanie Joosten

Quiet (Japanese: クワイエット, Hepburn: Kuwaietto) is a fictional character from Konami's Metal Gear series. Created by Hideo Kojima, designed by Yoji Shinkawa, and based on and voiced by Stefanie Joosten, Quiet appears in the 2015 action-adventure stealth game, Metal Gear Solid V: The Phantom Pain. The character is a skilled assassin and sniper with superhuman abilities belonging to the covert strike force XOF, a rogue division of the American intelligence agency Cipher. Depending on the player's actions, she can be captured by Venom Snake and eventually used as a member of his Diamond Dogs mercenary group to participate in missions.

Quiet has been praised for her characterization, though many Western critics considered her design oversexualized and were generally dissatisfied with the in-game explanation for it. In regards to the visual design, Kojima remarked that he was striving for a unique character, not simply eroticism. Quiet has become a popular character to cosplay.

== Conception and design ==
Quiet was modeled after, motion captured and voiced by Dutch model Stefanie Joosten. She received a phone call from her agency to audition as a motion capture actress for an unspecified video game. However, being a big fan of video games, she recognized game director Hideo Kojima at the audition and suspected it was for a new Metal Gear game. After getting the role and beginning the motion capture and 3D scanning process, Joosten was shown artwork of the character, which she said looked almost exactly the same as the finished product, but was not told specifically what character she would be playing. The process took two years, and having never held a gun before, she received professional combat-training in order to handle several weapons. Although the character does not speak during most of the game, Kojima was so satisfied with Joosten's work that he asked her to "voice" the character by expressing a range of emotions through only groans and hums. "Quiet's Theme", a humming vocal piece composed by Akihiro Honda and written by Ludvig Forrsell, was sung by Joosten for the game's original soundtrack; she also performed it on stage at The Game Awards 2015.

When asked about Quiet, Kojima replied: "In the game, Quiet is the main heroine. Whether she is friend or foe has yet to be revealed so I had to be careful when casting her role. MGS normally has old timers and old guys (laughs). Stefanie is very skilled in action but since she never held that type of gun, we asked her to do some training at home." Speaking about Quiet's design just days after her full reveal in September 2013, Kojima tweeted that he asked lead designer Yoji Shinkawa for a "more erotic" character; in fact, his original idea of her was her being naked. In response to the reaction to this statement, he clarified: "Maybe the phrase 'erotic' wasn't really [the correct word for] what I was trying to say. What I'm really trying to do is create unique characters. One of those is, of course, Quiet. She's a really unique character, I wanted to add that sexiness to her. It wasn't really supposed to be erotic, but sexy." He also said, "You're going to notice [when you play,] but there's limited dialogue with [characters], and for that reason we really want to show the characteristic from each character. Sexy could be for guys, weapons, vehicles, it's really that characteristic." Shinkawa added, "From my perspective, it's not just the characters, but often I look at a weapon or a vehicle and think 'That's really sexy.' It's not just the characters, but the mechs and weapons [as well]."

Kojima stated Quiet's design was to appeal to cosplayers and to sell figures; he also made further tweets to demonstrate details of the character to early cosplayers. Kojima said about her clothing, "Once you see how she fits into the story, you will understand why she looks the way she does. Without any of this background I can certainly understand why there are concerns. I will say there's a reason she looks the way she does and wears those clothes. And it's all a part of the game, learning those reasons one by one." As noted by Kojima himself, Quiet is the only heroic female character of Metal Gear Solid V, contrasting with the usual three of four in most of his earlier works; he described her as powerful yet vulnerable. He also later compared Quiet to Matilda Lutz's protagonist character from the 2017 rape and revenge action-thriller film Revenge.

Joosten talked of pre-release fan theories such as these of Quiet being a sex-changed Chico from the previous games or a young Sniper Wolf, both of which she denied. Kojima had earlier stated in 2013, "I know there's people concerning about 'Quiet' but don't worry. I created her character as an antithesis to the women characters appeared in the past fighting game who are excessively exposed. 'Quiet' who doesn't have a word will be teased in the story as well. But once you recognize the secret reason for her exposure, you will feel ashamed of your words & deeds." He added, "The response of 'Quiet' disclosure few days ago incited by the net is exactly what MGSV itself is."

== Appearance ==
=== Fictional character biography ===
Within the Metal Gear series, Quiet appears only in Metal Gear Solid V: The Phantom Pain. When Big Boss awakens in a Cyprus hospital from a coma in 1984, Quiet is one of many soldiers sent by Cipher to kill him. As she is about to kill her target, a man calling himself Ishmael helps fight her off. She is covered in medical grade ethanol and other chemicals and lit on fire until she escapes via a window.

Quiet is then seen deployed to Afghanistan by Skull Face and tasked with eliminating Soviet officers who are against his development of Metal Gear Sahelanthropus. After Venom Snake walks into her line of sight, she proceeds to open fire on him. After defeating her in a fight, the player can choose to kill her or capture her and bring her back to their base. If the latter is chosen, she is tortured in an interrogation but Revolver Ocelot convinces Master Miller not to execute her. Speaking to Code Talker in Navajo, Quiet reveals that Skull Face intended to use her against Venom Snake and his army; she would allow herself to be captured and taken to Mother Base, then infect everyone there with the English-language strain of vocal chord parasites implanted in her. These parasites would spread to and ultimately kill anyone on the base that spoke English (essentially all members of Diamond Dogs), including herself. She was further subjected to "parasite therapy" prior to her deployment, whereby parasites were introduced to her body to keep her alive after she was set on fire. They also give her enhanced strength, mobility and speed as well as inhuman resilience, durability and recovery abilities. Unlike the Skulls unit of parasite-enhanced soldiers encountered through the game, Quiet retains an outwardly human appearance. Due to her injuries, the parasites compensated for her burned epidermis, giving her the ability to 'breathe' through her skin, requiring her to wear as little clothes as possible, as covering her skin would suffocate her. However, her time spent with Diamond Dogs led her to defect from XOF, and she retained her silence to prevent infection. After a second parasite outbreak occurs on Diamond Dogs' base due to a mutation, Quiet disappears into Afghanistan, realizing that she could never guarantee the safety of Diamond Dogs. Believing that she has betrayed them, Venom Snake follows to investigate. Snake helps her fight off a Soviet regiment, but she is forced to speak English to save him when he is bitten by a venomous snake. Quiet disappears to avoid causing another epidemic; walking alone in the desert, her fate is unknown. (Note: While the game depicts Quiet's ultimate fate as ambiguous, Kenji Yano's novelization has her commit suicide via immolation to prevent any potential of an outbreak of the parasites.)

=== Gameplay ===
If Quiet is recruited into Diamond Dogs, it is possible for the player to use her as a Buddy character on missions. When chosen, Quiet is most useful as a support providing covering fire during infiltration missions. Quiet's interactions and skills depends on the bond level between her and Venom Snake; she can be equipped with either her standard rifle named Wicked Butterfly, a non-lethal rifle named Guilty Butterfly, firing tranquilizer rounds, or a high-powered lethal rifle named Sinful Butterfly. An unlockable allows the player to unlock Sniper Wolf's uniform from the original Metal Gear Solid for Quiet to wear.

The November 2015 release of the Version 1.06 update adds the ability to bring Quiet back in the game. The player needs to complete "Mission 11: Cloaked in Silence" seven times in a row without killing or leaving Quiet, to unlock a version of the mission titled "[Reunion]: Cloaked in Silence". Completing this new version of the mission will have Quiet return permanently with all of the equipment she had at the time she left. A 2018 update has turned Quiet into an optional player character in FOB missions online. The playable Quiet's primary weapon remains a sniper rifle. Her superhuman abilities enable her to perform special dashes; she can also drop safely from any height and climb in an instant.

== Merchandise and reception ==
Before the release of the game, the presentation of Quiet was criticized for being what was perceived by some as oversexualization and an affirmation of the negative stereotype of the video game industry. Joosten herself was surprised with the controversy, but said, "When I got to see her design, I was shocked too. But everybody didn't get to hear her story yet so I can understand people are angry about it or saying she is showing too much. But I am not bothered by it." Square Enix released Quiet's action figure in the Play Arts KAI series in May 2015. The figure's soft, pliable breasts demonstrated on Twitter by Kojima and Shinkawa, the latter of whom did serve as its production supervisor, were criticized in social media and in the press in the West. She was generally well received in Japan. AOL Japan noted that the announcement of the "erotic" figure caused a buzz on Twitter. Famitsu positively commented on the "realistic fleshiness" of the figure, in addition to focusing on the beauty of the "real Quiet" Stefanie Joosten and how well the "super sexy" game character was made to resemble her. A more conventional, 1/6 scale statue of Quiet was released by Gecco Corp in 2016; its review by Dengeki Hobby praised this figure for its high quality and for showing the various aspects of the character's attractiveness and an attention to detail. Another Quiet figure was released by Octohead in 2018.

Quiet's portrayal in The Phantom Pain was criticized as oversexualized in the West, but not in Japan. Gizmodo Japan described the optional cutscene shown in the image in terms of sexiness.

The finished game drew more Western criticism of Quiet in both reviews and opinion pieces, who felt the story did not sufficiently justify her lack of clothing. Kojima's statement that critics of the design would feel ashamed once the game released was derided. GamesRadar's David Roberts described Quiet as "one of the most complex and conflicted characters in MGS5", but that her depiction was an example of a "juvenile approach to sexuality" that typifies Kojima's work and the Metal Gear series as a whole. Michael McWhertor of Polygon described the justification for Quiet's attire as "inextricably tied to the game's convoluted story", and criticized how the game presented other female characters by "zeroing in on their jiggling breasts and panning across their asses in a silly, oversexualized way."

On the other hand, GameZone's James Wynne felt that the game's story explanation was a valid enough reason for her scantily-clad appearance and succeeded in Kojima's aim to make Quiet "a true antithesis to sexy-just-because female characters." He wrote that "Fan service doesn't erase the fact that Quiet is a strong, well-written character that doesn't need a man to save her. That puts her on a level comparable to The Boss, who was the most impressive female character to ever grace a video game." Vince Ingenito of IGN called Quiet the most interesting character in the game, writing that her "warm, childlike sincerity and battlefield ferocity cause her to steal every scene she's in." He did feel disappointed that she was also "required to be a lust-object."

In an interview with IGN in 2023, Joosten said that the discussion around Quiet had been interesting, and that she respected the choices made for the character from a "fantasy" perspective. However, Joosten also sympathised with those who criticized Quiet, feeling her attire was "not practical at all" and that this design choice could have been avoided.

In the initial release of the game, some players were disappointed that they lost the option of using Quiet as an ally after completing "Mission 45: A Quiet Exit". Roberts wrote that few developers would be willing to incur the wrath of players by creating one of the most powerful characters in the game by "integrating her completely so as to make her absolutely vital during some particularly difficult missions, then taking her away forever. But it's one of the many ways Kojima is able to express the game's themes — of loss, of despair, of that lingering 'phantom pain' right there in the game's title — and I respect the hell out of Kojima for removing a core component of gameplay to express those themes."

Among those who have portrayed Quiet in cosplay was Maja Felicitas in a widely acclaimed photo session by the photographer eosAndy. Others have included the girlfriend of Oculus Rift creator Palmer Luckey, Nicole Edelmann (Nikki Moxxi), as well as Luckey himself, who both wore their respective self-made costumes in public during a visit to Japan. Quiet was also portrayed by Alex Zedra, a character model who had starred in marketing campaigns for the Call of Duty series.
