= Stefanie Joosten =

Dutch model, singer and actress (born 1988)

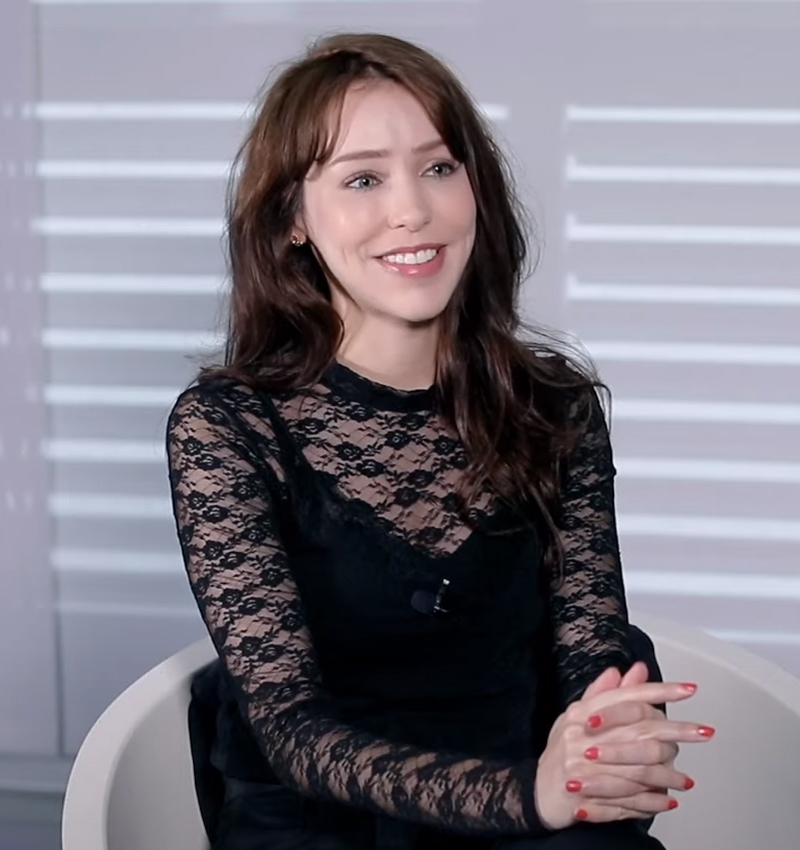
- Joosten in 2019
- Born: August 5, 1988 (age 38); Roermond, Limburg, Netherlands
- Education: University of Leiden (BA)
- Occupations: Model; actress; singer
- Years active: 2011–present
- Known for: Quiet in Metal Gear Solid V: The Phantom Pain
- Modeling information
- Height: 167 cm (5 ft 5 1/2 in)
- Website: stefaniejoosten.com

Stefanie Joosten (/ˈjoʊstən/ YOH-stən, Dutch: [ˈsteːfaːni ˈjoːstə(n)]; born 5 August 1988) (Note: Japanese: ステファニー・ヨーステン, Hepburn: Sutefanī Yōsuten) is a Dutch actress, singer and former model based in Japan. She first gained widespread public attention when Japanese developer Konami revealed she would be providing the motion capture, voice, and likeness for the character Quiet in the 2015 video game Metal Gear Solid V: The Phantom Pain.

== Early life ==
Stefanie Joosten was born in Roermond, Limburg, in the southeastern Netherlands. She attended the Bisschoppelijk College Broekhin in Roermond, where she followed a bilingual (Dutch and English) course. After growing up obsessed with otaku culture, Joosten decided to study Japanese language and culture at Leiden University. In 2009, she went to Kyoto for a year as part of an exchange program. It was after this experience that she decided she would move to Tokyo after earning her degree back in the Netherlands.

== Career ==
While in Japan, Joosten came into contact with several modeling agencies that happened to specifically seek Western models. She started doing modeling jobs in 2011. After doing numerous small acting roles and commercials, she got a call from a mystery agent who was looking for models to help with an undisclosed video game. Joosten, who had been into Japanese games since childhood, became suspicious when she recognized one of the people during the auditions. She later found out this was the famous video game developer Hideo Kojima, giving her an idea of what she had auditioned for. She was chosen as both the visual and voice model for Quiet, a central female character in the Metal Gear game Metal Gear Solid V: The Phantom Pain. Joosten also sang the song "Quiet's Theme" from the game's original soundtrack.

In early 2019, Joosten joined the cast of Spacelords as Sööma. In 2021, she joined the cast of Wanted: Dead, appeared on the soundtrack for the game and also contributed to the project as the lead cinematic director.

Joosten released her debut album, Singing to the Sky, in 2022. It was helmed by Giorgio Moroder as the executive producer, and features songs written by Moroder, Pete Bellotte, and Tom Whitlock. It was the first time in 40 years that Moroder put his name on a record by an emerging artist. Matt Sorum and Kenny Wayne Shepherd made guest appearances on the record. Uncut's Piers Martin praised the songs cowritten by Moroder, but said that "tellingly, the rest of the material is more generic".

In 2023, Stefanie Joosten announced a new album, Intermission. The first single "Tryouts for the Human Race" is a collaboration with Giorgio Moroder, covering a song he co-wrote with Ron and Russell Mael of Sparks for their first collaboration in 1979.

== Filmography ==
=== Video games ===
Year	Title	Role	Notes
2015	Metal Gear Solid V: The Phantom Pain	Quiet	Voice (English and Japanese), facial capture and motion capture
2016	ICEY	ICEY	Voice (English and Japanese)
2018	Muse Dash	Narrator	Voice
2019	Spacelords	Sööma	Voice (English), facial capture and motion capture
2019	Last Labyrinth	Katia	Voice
2022	Soulstice	Briar, Lute	Voice
2023	Wanted: Dead	Vivienne Niemantsverdriet	Voice, facial capture

=== Feature films ===
Year	Title	Role	Notes
2017	Hostage X		
2017	Alessandra and the Fitter	Alessandra	
2019	Transit 17	Snow	
TBA	Implosion: ZERO_DAY	Faye Garron	voice

=== Short films ===
Year	Title	Role	Notes
2016	Tom's Treasure Hunt	Vera	short film
2016	The Actor and The Model	TV show hostess	short film
2019	The Road of Repentance	Lenora	short film

=== Television ===
Year	Title	Role	Notes
2014	Tonari no Seki-kun: The Master of Killing Time	Herself – Performer	Opening Theme (Dutch version)
2015	The Game Awards	Herself – Performer	
2015–2016	The StefanDonna Show	Herself	Web series
2017	Tokyayo	Herself	Episode: "Faberyayo has a date with the beautiful Stefanie in the geek-mecca"
2023	Vivienne's Late Night Chow	Vivienne Niemantsverdriet	Web series tied to the "Wanted: Dead" game
