= List of awards and nominations received by Kiefer Sutherland =

Kiefer Sutherland awards and nominations
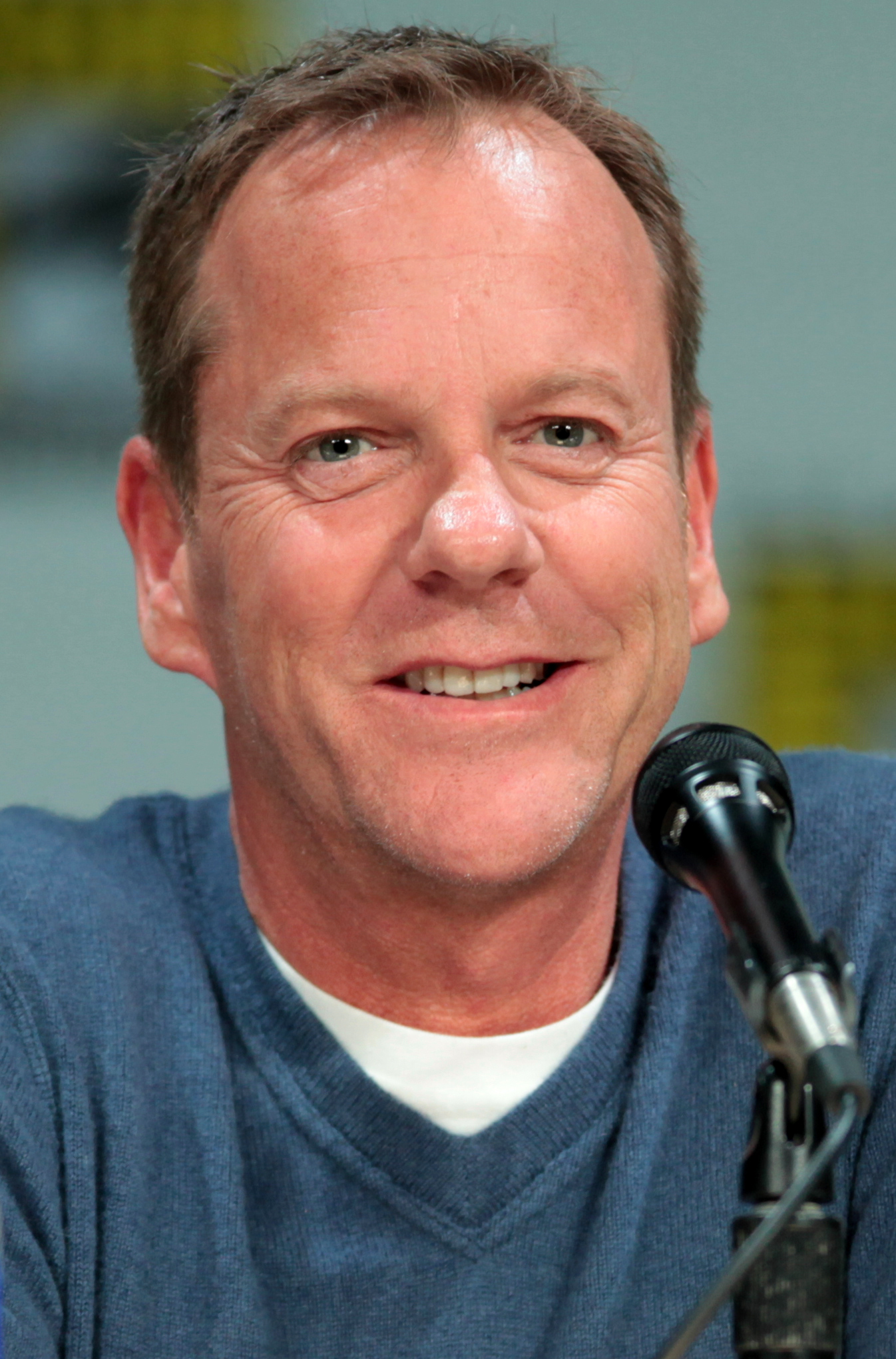
- Sutherland at the 2014 San Diego Comic-Con
Awards and nominations
Award	Wins	Nominations
Critics' Choice Television Awards	0	2
Golden Globe Awards	1	6
Primetime Emmy Awards	2	11
Screen Actors Guild Awards	2	9

Totals (Note: Certain award groups do not simply award one winner. They acknowledge several different recipients, have runners-up, and have third place. Since this is a specific recognition and is different from losing an award, runner-up mentions are considered wins in this award tally. For simplification and to avoid errors, each award in this list has been presumed to have had a prior nomination.)
- Wins: 21
- Nominations: 62

British-Canadian actor and musician Kiefer Sutherland has earned numerous accolades, including a Golden Globe Award, two Primetime Emmy Awards and two Screen Actors Guild Awards. He's also received stars on Canada's Walk of Fame and on the Hollywood Walk of Fame.

== Major industry awards ==
=== Emmy Awards ===
Year	Category	Recipient/Nominated work	Role(s)	Result	Ref.
Primetime Emmy Awards
2002	Outstanding Lead Actor in a Drama Series	24	Jack Bauer	Nominated	
2003	Outstanding Drama Series	24	Producer	Nominated	
2003	Outstanding Lead Actor in a Drama Series	24	Jack Bauer	Nominated	
2004	Outstanding Drama Series	24	Co-Executive Producer	Nominated	
2004	Outstanding Lead Actor in a Drama Series	24	Jack Bauer	Nominated	
2005	Outstanding Drama Series	24	Co-Executive Producer	Nominated	
2005	Outstanding Lead Actor in a Drama Series	24	Jack Bauer	Nominated	
2006	Outstanding Drama Series	24	Co-Executive Producer	Won	
2006	Outstanding Lead Actor in a Drama Series	24	Jack Bauer	Won	
2007	Outstanding Lead Actor in a Drama Series	24	Jack Bauer	Nominated	
2009	Outstanding Lead Actor in a Miniseries or Movie	24: Redemption	Jack Bauer	Nominated	

=== Golden Globe Awards ===
Year	Category	Recipient/Nominated work	Role(s)	Result	Ref.
2002	Best Actor – Television Series Drama	24	Jack Bauer	Won	
2003	Best Actor – Television Series Drama	24	Jack Bauer	Nominated	
2004	Best Actor – Television Series Drama	24	Jack Bauer	Nominated	
2006	Best Actor – Television Series Drama	24	Jack Bauer	Nominated	
2007	Best Actor – Television Series Drama	24	Jack Bauer	Nominated	
2009	Best Actor – Miniseries or Television Film	24: Redemption	Jack Bauer	Nominated	

=== Screen Actors Guild Awards ===
Year	Category	Recipient/Nominated work	Role(s)	Result	Ref.
2003	Outstanding Performance by a Male Actor in a Drama Series	24	Jack Bauer	Nominated	
2003	Outstanding Performance by an Ensemble in a Drama Series	24	Jack Bauer	Nominated	
2004	Outstanding Performance by a Male Actor in a Drama Series	24	Jack Bauer	Won	
2005	Outstanding Performance by a Male Actor in a Drama Series	24	Jack Bauer	Nominated	
2005	Outstanding Performance by an Ensemble in a Drama Series	24	Jack Bauer	Nominated	
2006	Outstanding Performance by a Male Actor in a Drama Series	24	Jack Bauer	Won	
2007	Outstanding Performance by a Male Actor in a Drama Series	24	Jack Bauer	Nominated	
2007	Outstanding Performance by an Ensemble in a Drama Series	24	Jack Bauer	Nominated	
2009	Outstanding Performance by a Male Actor in a Miniseries or Television Movie	24: Redemption	Jack Bauer	Nominated	

== Other awards and nominations ==
=== Golden Raspberry Awards ===
Year	Category	Recipient/Nominated work	Role(s)	Result	Ref.
2014	Worst Supporting Actor	Pompeii	Senator Quintus Attius Corvus	Nominated	

=== MTV Movie & TV Awards ===
Year	Category	Recipient/Nominated work	Role(s)	Result	Ref.
1997	Best Villain	A Time to Kill	Freddie Lee Cobb	Nominated	
2004	Best Villain	Phone Booth	The Caller	Nominated	

=== Satellite Awards ===
Year	Category	Recipient/Nominated work	Role(s)	Result	Ref.
2002	Best Actor – Television Series Drama	24	Jack Bauer	Won	
2003	Best Actor – Television Series Drama	24	Jack Bauer	Won	
2015	Best Actor – Miniseries or Television Film	24: Live Another Day	Jack Bauer	Nominated	

=== Saturn Awards ===
Year	Category	Recipient/Nominated work	Role(s)	Result	Ref.
2007	Best Actor on Television	24	Jack Bauer	Nominated	

== Critics' awards ==
Year	Association	Category	Recipient/Nominated work	Role(s)	Result	Ref.
2015	Critics' Choice Television Awards	Best Actor in a Movie/Miniseries	24: Live Another Day	Jack Bauer	Nominated	
2024	Critics' Choice Television Awards	Best Actor in a Movie/Miniseries	The Caine Mutiny Court-Martial	Lieutenant Commander Phillip Queeg	Nominated	

== Honors ==
Honors	Year	Category	Recipient	Result	Ref
Canada's Walk of Fame	2005	Arts & Entertainment; Film	Kiefer Sutherland	Won	
Hollywood Walk of Fame	2008	Star on the Walk of Fame for Television	Kiefer Sutherland	Won	

== See also ==
- Kiefer Sutherland filmography
