= Fox Engine =

Video game engine created by Konami

- Developer: Konami
- Release: September 2013; 13 years ago
- Platform: Microsoft Windows; PlayStation 3; PlayStation 4; Xbox 360; Xbox One
- License: Proprietary

The Fox Engine is a discontinued proprietary game engine by Konami. The engine's development began with Hideo Kojima after the completion of 2008's Metal Gear Solid 4, with the goal of making the "best engine in the world." The first commercially released title to use the Fox Engine was Pro Evolution Soccer 2014.

The engine was designed to make it possible for Kojima Productions to develop multiplatform games with a significantly shortened development time and has been described as the first step for the developer to move away from development for a single platform. The engine is named after FOX, a fictional military unit from the Metal Gear series, wherein is also a reflection of Kojima Productions itself, which based its company logo on FOX's fox emblem.

After seven years of use on the Pro Evolution Soccer series, Konami discontinued use of the Fox Engine in favor of Unreal Engine due to PES Productions focusing development efforts on the PlayStation 5 and Xbox Series X consoles.

== Development ==
A demo of the engine was shown at Konami's conference at E3 2011. Taking place in a jungle environment, the demo showed off the engine's visual capabilities and featured a young man running around the area, as well as a horse and a dog. The tech-demo was not showcasing a game to be released; instead, it showed a test area for the development of the engine, based on assets created for Metal Gear Solid V: The Phantom Pain. Kojima Productions planned to use the engine for all future titles, most prominently in Metal Gear Solid V: The Phantom Pain, which was revealed by Hideo Kojima, the series creator at a special 25th anniversary of the series event in Tokyo.

On August 17, 2011, Kojima released a series of images on Twitter. The images were of facial tests created in the Fox Engine. In addition, during a lecture at the University of Southern California held by Hideo Kojima, an image was shown to various students in a demonstration of the Fox Engine's capabilities with a scene depicting a forest environment. Later, on December 16, Kojima released more images over Twitter, including one image showcasing cloth transparency.

On March 2, 2012, the Development Without Borders website uploaded a "classified" CD labeled "Fox Engine Lighting Sample" that contained two pictures of the Kojima Productions staff room, and asked which picture was real, and which was a simulation created using the Fox Engine. Clicking on the images would reveal which image was which, and explained more about how the engine simulated the staff room. The second slide also depicted some hoops and levitating balls of varying colors and materials on the table, as well as a picture of a horse in the staff room.

At the "Zone of the Enders HD ReBOOT Preview" event on May 25, 2012, Kojima confirmed that work on the next installment in the Zone of the Enders series had begun under the codename Enders Project. The game was to be developed using the Fox Engine, however, the project has since been put on indefinite hold due to the underwhelming sales of Zone of the Enders: HD Collection.

On June 8, 2012, in an interview with CVG, Kojima confirmed that the Fox Engine was running on "[PlayStation 3], [Xbox 360] and current PCs".

On March 14, 2013, Joakim Mogren, the head of Moby Dick Studio, appeared on GameTrailers TV to show off some screenshots of their recently announced game, The Phantom Pain, on an iPad. Some of the screenshots contained the Fox Engine logo on the bottom right corner, with Geoff Keighley pointing this out to Mogren and asking why they were present. Mogren appeared nervous after being asked, and the interview abruptly ended. Several gaming websites believed that the interview had been staged.

On March 27, 2013, The Phantom Pain was revealed to be Metal Gear Solid V, and Moby Dick Studio, as well as its head Joakim Mogren, were revealed to be fictional. Kojima explained that The Phantom Pain was presented as a project unrelated to the Metal Gear franchise in order to better observe the public response to the Fox Engine's capabilities.

== Games using Fox Engine ==
Title	Year	Platform(s)	Genre(s)
Pro Evolution Soccer 2014	2013	Microsoft Windows, PlayStation 3, Xbox 360	Sports
Metal Gear Solid V: Ground Zeroes	2014	Microsoft Windows, PlayStation 3, PlayStation 4, Xbox 360, Xbox One	Stealth action
P.T.	2014	PlayStation 4	Survival horror
Pro Evolution Soccer 2015	2014	Microsoft Windows, PlayStation 3, PlayStation 4, Xbox 360, Xbox One	Sports
Metal Gear Solid V: The Phantom Pain	2015	Microsoft Windows, PlayStation 3, PlayStation 4, Xbox 360, Xbox One	Stealth action
Pro Evolution Soccer 2016	2015	Microsoft Windows, PlayStation 3, PlayStation 4, Xbox 360, Xbox One	Sports
Pro Evolution Soccer 2017	2016	Microsoft Windows, PlayStation 3, PlayStation 4, Xbox 360, Xbox One	Sports
Pro Evolution Soccer 2018	2017	Microsoft Windows, PlayStation 3, PlayStation 4, Xbox 360, Xbox One	Sports
Metal Gear Survive	2018	Microsoft Windows, PlayStation 4, Xbox One	Survival
Pro Evolution Soccer 2019	2018	Microsoft Windows, PlayStation 4, Xbox One	Sports
eFootball Pro Evolution Soccer 2020	2019	Microsoft Windows, PlayStation 4, Xbox One	Sports
eFootball PES 2021 Season Update	2020	Microsoft Windows, PlayStation 4, Xbox One	Sports
