= Pro Evolution Soccer 2015 =

2014 video game

- German PlayStation 4 cover art featuring Bayern Munich's Mario Götze
- Developer: PES Productions
- Publisher: Konami
- Producer: Kris Keith
- Series: Pro Evolution Soccer
- Engine: Fox Engine
- Platforms: Microsoft Windows; PlayStation 3 PlayStation 4 Xbox 360; Xbox One
- Release: NA: November 11, 2014; EU: November 13, 2014; JP: November 13, 2014
- Genre: Sports
- Modes: Single-player, multiplayer

Pro Evolution Soccer 2015 (abbreviated as PES 2015 and known as World Soccer: Winning Eleven 2015 in Japan) is a football simulation game developed by PES Productions and published by Konami for Microsoft Windows, PlayStation 3, PlayStation 4, Xbox 360, and Xbox One. It is the fourteenth edition of the Pro Evolution Soccer series. The cover of the game features Mario Götze of Bayern Munich (except for the Japanese version, whose cover art features Keisuke Honda of A.C. Milan). In this game, the slogan used was The Pitch is Ours for the first time. PES 2015 was followed by Pro Evolution Soccer 2016.

== Downloadable content ==
The game's first downloadable content pack was released on 9 November 2014, ahead of the official launch of PES 2015 on 13 November. The pack adds an extra eight European teams (Slovan Bratislava, FK Partizan, Maccabi Tel Aviv, Ludogorets Razgrad, HJK Helsinki, Qarabağ, Legia Warsaw, Sparta Prague), the Copa Sudamericana 2014 tournament, summer transfers, new player faces, latest squad lineups, and a series of latest boots from Adidas, Nike and Puma.

A second downloadable content pack was released on 15 December, adding four new teams and stadia, among other updates.

== Demo ==
The PES 2015 demo became available on 1 September 2014. The playable teams are Bayern Munich, Barcelona, Real Madrid, Atlético Madrid, Juventus, & Napoli.

== Reception ==
Reception

Aggregate scores
Aggregator	Score
GameRankings	(PS4) 83.32% (PC) 71.67% (XONE) 76.86%
Metacritic	(PS4) 82/100 (PC) 82/100 (XONE) 78/100

Review scores
Publication	Score
Eurogamer	9/10
Game Informer	8.5/10
GamesMaster	85%
GameSpot	8/10
GamesRadar+	4.5/5
IGN	9/10 (English); 9.3/10 (Italian)
PlayStation Official Magazine – Australia	8.5/10
PlayStation Official Magazine – UK	9/10
Play	88%
Hardcore Gamer	4/5

The game sold 1.72 million units worldwide.

Pro Evolution Soccer 2015 received generally positive reviews from critics. IGN scored it a 9 out of 10, stating "PES 2015 embraces its PS2-era roots while offering almost everything you could want from a modern football simulation." However, they criticized the presentation, saying that it still needs some work. Hardcore Gamer gave the game a 4 out of 5, saying, "After a few submissive years, Konami has put forth a game that caters to soccer fans with superb flexibility for creative expression, fluid gameplay and astoundingly intelligent AI."
