= Pro Evolution Soccer 2014 =

2013 video game

- European cover art (In the Japanese version of this game, the cover art features the Japan national football team.)
- Developer: Konami
- Publisher: Konami
- Producer: Kei Masuda
- Designers: Jeremy Renbenner (Visuals); Kousikui Onami (Accelerated Graphics); Anthony Macker (North American Lead)
- Series: Pro Evolution Soccer
- Engine: Fox Engine; Havok (physics engine)
- Platforms: Microsoft Windows; Nintendo 3DS; PlayStation 2 PlayStation 3 PlayStation Portable; Xbox 360
- Release: PlayStation 3: EU: September 20, 2013; NA: September 24, 2013; AU: October 3, 2013; JP: November 14, 2013; Xbox 360: EU: September 20, 2013; NA: September 24, 2013; AU: October 3, 2013; Microsoft Windows: EU: September 20, 2013; NA: September 24, 2013; AU: October 3, 2013; PlayStation 2: EU: November 8, 2013; PlayStation Portable: EU: November 8, 2013; JP: November 14, 2013; NA: March 10, 2014; Nintendo 3DS: JP: November 14, 2013
- Genre: Sports
- Modes: Single-player, multiplayer

Pro Evolution Soccer 2014 (officially abbreviated as PES 2014, also known in Asia as World Soccer: Winning Eleven 2014 and World Soccer: Winning Eleven 2014 - Aoki Samurai no Chousen in Japan only) is an association football video game developed and published by Konami for Microsoft Windows, Nintendo 3DS, PlayStation 2, PlayStation 3, PlayStation Portable, and Xbox 360 in 2013. The cover art for the game was the first in the series not to feature a football player since Pro Evolution Soccer 3 was released in 2003, although a later version was released with football players on the cover. PES 2014 was the last game to be released on the PlayStation 2 in Europe and the last PlayStation 2 game to be released entirely. It was succeeded by Pro Evolution Soccer 2015.

== Gameplay ==
Pro Evolution Soccer 2014 was developed with six key elements meant to define the physics and the features of the game. PES 2014 centers everything on the ball: how it moves, and how players use it. Physics of the ball, stature of the player, speed and height of the pass are taken into account to recreate the most realistic football experience on a home system.

Players are an important part of the game with Motion Animation Stability System (M.A.S.S.), increasing the realism of physical contacts between players, tackles and decisions taken on the pitch by the AI to have more open games. The audience has an influence on the performance of the team. On the pitch, the performance of an individual player, good or bad, will also have an effect on the team, giving them a moral boost if he has a moment of individual brilliance; or forcing his teammates to support him if he is not doing well.

Introduced in PES 2013, the Player ID system recreated faithfully the movements and skills of about 50 star players. In PES 2014, that number is increased and will also apply to complete squads to replicate a team's playing style. With the new Combination Plan, users are able set up a variety of different tactics in key areas of the pitch using three or more players. These players can make very different runs to exploit holes in the defense or midfield, using the flanks, curved runs, or overlapping play to make themselves available.

Once again, the UEFA Champions League, UEFA Europa League and UEFA Super Cup competitions are fully licensed in the game, and the First Playable UEFA Europa League without entering Master League, Become a Legend, and/or League. For the first time, the game features an exclusive license for the AFC Champions League, the Argentine Primera División, Chilean Primera División, and Arabic commentary as well, by Rhaouf Khelif of beIN Sports, also Argentinean commentary, by Mariano Closs and Fernando Niembro, and Chilean commentary by Fernando Solabarrieta and Patricio Yáñez of Fox Sports Latinoamérica. Jon Champion and Jim Beglin provide as English commentary. Also Jon Kabira, Tsuyoshi Kitazawa and Hiroshi Nanami provide as Japanese commentary.

New for this year, players can now change teams in the Master League and coach a national side. Players are also able to create 3rd and 4th kits. Some third and fourth kits are official. The PS2 version has the same characteristics of the other versions. UEFA Europa League also appears as a single-mode. Rain does not feature in PES 2014 due to the engine upgrade, as well as the Stadium Editor and La Liga stadiums because of licensing restrictions.

== Development and release ==
Pro Evolution Soccer 2014 was officially announced by Konami on March 10, 2013. The game was released on September 19 in Europe, September 20 in United Kingdom, and on November 14 in Japan. The playable demo became available on September 11 for download. The PlayStation 2 version of the game was released only in Europe, and aside from being the last game released on the system in this region, it is also the final game to be released on the system overall. It is also the last retailed PlayStation Portable game released in Europe and Mainland Asia.

=== Downloadable content ===
In March 2014, a downloadable content pack added the World Challenge mode to PES 2014. The World Challenge is a tournament similar to the FIFA World Cup, with national football teams taking part to compete for the trophy. The World Challenge DLC provided official World Cup kits to licensed teams that would take part in the 2014 FIFA World Cup. The mode also allowed some national teams which were unplayable in normal modes to compete, although these teams are also unlicensed, with made-up player names and incorrect strips.

=== Engine ===
PES 2014 uses the Fox Engine, a cross-platform game engine built by Kojima Productions, believed to be designed for the next generation of video games. The engine's development began after the completion of Metal Gear Solid 4: Guns of the Patriots and it was revealed by Konami on June 3, 2011. The engine was to make it possible for Kojima Productions to develop multiplatform games with a significantly shortened development time and has been described as the first step for the developer to move away from development for a single platform. The new engine makes use of Havok "for a comprehensive simulation of each on-field player. Each player's intricate movements are naturally represented according to the individual player's mass and physique, and each uniform reacts realistically according to the players' moves and speed." Unlike versions released on Windows and seventh generation home consoles, the PlayStation 2 version is not developed with the Fox Engine.

=== World Soccer: Winning Eleven 2014 - Aoki Samurai no Chousen ===
Just like World Soccer: Winning Eleven 2010 after 4 years. This version includes two new modes: Japan Challenge, where the Japan national football team competes to win the FIFA World Cup in Brazil, and the licensed J.League (only in the PS3 and 3DS versions). The game was released on 22 May 2014 in Japan only.

=== Server shutdown ===
On August 11, 2015, Konami announced that the game servers for the game would be shut down on the following November 17 due to the company focusing on newer games.

== Reception ==
Reception

Aggregate scores
Aggregator	Score
GameRankings	(X360) 77.92% (PS3) 79.48% (PC) 70.00%
Metacritic	(X360) 80/100 (PS3) 78/100 (PC) 74/100

Review scores
Publication	Score
Eurogamer	9/10
Game Informer	8.25/10
GameSpot	6.0/10
IGN	8.4/10
VideoGamer.com	9/10

The game received generally positive reviews from most major sources. IGN gave the game a score of 8.4 out of 10, praising its high quality graphics, its passing being "crisp and zippy when it's played on the floor, while lofted balls can be driven or floated to great effect" and its improved ball control for allowing "dribbling to be much tighter than before" while pointing out some frame rate problems and saying that the game is overly physical given that the new Motion Animation Stability System "actually produces an unnecessary amount of tussling" but it also points out that the new system improves some other things. Eurogamer gave the game a 9 out of 10, again praising the high quality graphics given by the new engine stating that "movement and little touches are delivered with a craftsman's eye for detail", giving also some praise to the introduction of the free kick directional indicator that "allows you to target areas of the goal quite precisely" while criticizing the AI "which still sometimes ignores balls that are clearly easy to intercept". On the other hand, GameSpot gave the game mixed review, giving it a 6 out of 10, and criticizing the frame issues, the game's single and multiplayer modes, its AI, the commentary, and a loss in the direct control and feel of its predecessors, while noting the improved graphics and the ability to "provide a fun game of football".
