= Fernando Niembro =

Argentine sports journalist and announcer

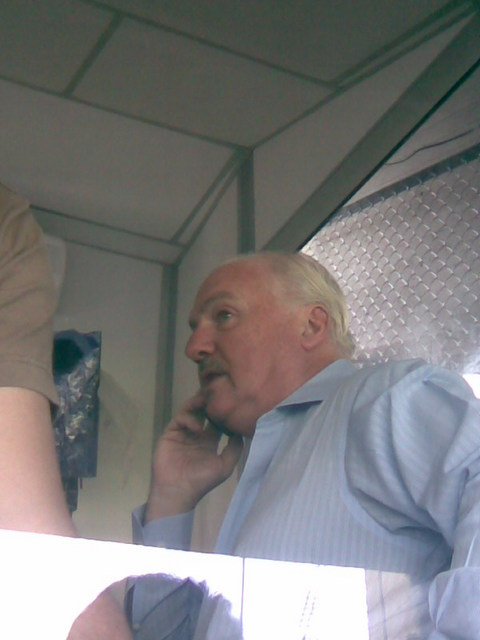
- Born: 7 December 1947 (age 78); Buenos Aires, Argentina
- Occupation: Sports journalist
- Notable credit: PES 2014
- Political party: Republican Proposal

Fernando Niembro (born 7 December 1947 in Buenos Aires) is an Argentine sports journalist and announcer.

== Biography ==
Niembro was born in a medium-class family in Parque Chacabuco. He is son of Paulino Niembro, a notable trade unionist during the 1970s.

During the government of Carlos Menem he was appointed as "media secretary", one of his tasks was to announce the Presidential Pardon for perpetrators of state terrorism in Argentina and members of insurgent groups the 1970s.

Since then he has had a long career as a sports journalist. Currently he hosts La Última Palabra in Fox Sports Latinoamérica (in the south feed). Previously he hosted some sports programs including Vamos con Niembro in AM Del Plata.

In 2013 Konami announced that Niembro, along with his colleague Mariano Closs will be the narrators in the Latin-American version of PES 2014, replacing the original Mexican voices.

== Politics ==
Niembro expressed interest in accompanying the PRO in the place that Macri determines. Thus, he headed the list of candidates for national deputy for the Buenos Aires Province by the Cambiemos Front, composed of the PRO, UCR, and the Civic Coalition ARI. On September 16, 2015, Niembro submitted his resignation from his candidacy due to complaints to La Usina and his contract with the Government of the City of Buenos Aires.
