= Pro Evolution Soccer 2016 =

2015 video game

- Portuguese Microsoft Windows cover featuring Brazil national team's Neymar
- Developer: PES Productions
- Publisher: Konami
- Director: Yoshikatsu Ogihara
- Series: Pro Evolution Soccer
- Engine: Fox Engine
- Platforms: Microsoft Windows; PlayStation 3 PlayStation 4 Xbox 360; Xbox One
- Release: NA: September 15, 2015; EU: September 17, 2015; UK: September 18, 2015; AU: September 22, 2015; JP: October 1, 2015
- Genre: Sports
- Modes: Single-player, multiplayer

Pro Evolution Soccer 2016 (abbreviated as PES 2016, marketed as Winning Eleven 2016 in Japan) is a football simulation game developed by PES Productions and published by Konami for Microsoft Windows, PlayStation 3, PlayStation 4, Xbox 360, and Xbox One. It is the fifteenth edition of the Pro Evolution Soccer series and marks PES Productions' 20th year of producing football games. Marketed with the slogan of "Love The Past, Play The Future", The cover of the game features Neymar Jr (seen wearing his Brazil national team kit). The name of the game has been changed from "World Soccer: Winning Eleven" to "Pro Evolution Soccer" in Asia, except Japan where it is titled "Winning Eleven". PES 2016 was succeeded by Pro Evolution Soccer 2017.

== Leagues and cups ==
At E3 2015, it was announced that Konami had extended their license for the UEFA Champions League, the UEFA Europa League and the UEFA Super Cup until 2018. At Gamescom 2015, it was announced that Konami had acquired the exclusive license for the upcoming UEFA Euro 2016; however, it was not going to be a part of the game from the beginning, and was eventually released in an update on 24 March 2016. Pro Evolution Soccer 2016 includes Ligue 1, La Liga, AFC Champions League, UEFA Champions League, UEFA Europa League, UEFA Super Cup, Copa Libertadores, Copa Sudamericana (2014 and 2015 seasons), Recopa Sudamericana, an unlicensed Serie A with 19 licensed teams, an unlicensed Premier League, with only Manchester United licensed, 3 teams from Bundesliga (Bayern Munich, Wolfsburg and Borussia Mönchengladbach) but still not a stand-in for the league, an unlicensed Football League Championship, an unlicensed Serie B, an unlicensed Portuguese League (only Benfica, Sporting CP and Porto were licensed), Ligue 2, Liga Adelante, an unlicensed Brazilian League, an unlicensed Chilean League (with only the teams competing in Copa Libertadores and Copa Sudamericana licensed), Eredivisie, an unlicensed Argentine League (with only the teams competing in Copa Libertadores and Copa Sudamericana licensed) and 4 teams from Brazilian Second Division (Vitória, Bahia, Botafogo and Criciúma).

== Demo Teams ==
The PES 2016 Demo played at August 13, 2015. the teams are played as Bayern Munich, Juventus, AS Roma, Palmeiras, Corinthians, France National Football Team and Brazil National Football Team.

== Pro Evolution Soccer 2016 myClub ==
Known as Winning Eleven 2016 myClub in Japan. As well as a mode inside the game, the myClub mode (an online mode in which the player assembles their own "dream team" from the game's database in the form of trading cards, akin to the FIFA series Ultimate Team mode) is also available as a stand-alone, free-to-play game, having been released on December 8, 2015, for the PlayStation 3 and PlayStation 4, and later released on February 3, 2016, for Steam. One new feature of myClub is the acquisition of "myClub Legends", classic players to bolster the team's ranks, such as Roberto Baggio, Roberto Carlos, Filippo Inzaghi, Luís Figo or Oliver Kahn.

== Download content ==
British PlayStation 4 UEFA Euro 2016 edition cover featuring Gareth Bale. A version of this cover was made available in Welsh – the first game cover ever to do so.

Data Pack 1 was released on 29 October 2015. The update added 8 new teams, new boot styles, new jerseys for some teams, 70 new and updated player likenesses, updated player rosters (covering transfers made up to 30 August), and some changes to gameplay.

Data Pack 2 was released on 3 December 2015. The update added 51 new player likenesses, updated player rosters (covering transfers made up to 19 October), eight new boot styles, two new ball designs, and new entrance sequences for Copa Libertadores and Sudamericana matches. The Estadio do Maracana stadium was made available exclusively for PlayStation 4 and Xbox One.

Data Pack 3 was released on 24 March 2016. The update was related to UEFA Euro 2016 and the content included the official kits and player likenesses for 15 officially licensed teams participating in the tournament. The remaining 9 teams wear generic uniforms. It also included the Stade de France, the venue of the tournament final. Konami issued a physical and digital standalone re-release of Pro Evolution Soccer 2016, including the Euro 2016 content, for PlayStation 4 and PlayStation 3 on 21 April 2016 in Europe and Japan. The mode contains each of the 24 teams that qualified for the 2016 tournament, along with ten other national teams that are featured in the game and did not qualify: Bosnia and Herzegovina, Bulgaria, Denmark, Greece, Israel, Netherlands, Norway, Scotland, Serbia and Slovenia. This is also the first UEFA European Championship videogame made by Konami; the previous videogames were made by Gremlin Interactive and EA Sports.

Data Pack 4 was released on 9 June 2016, and is the final update for Pro Evolution Soccer 2016. The data pack includes official UEFA Euro 2016 kits for the national teams of Croatia, England, France, Portugal and Turkey. It also adds new official kits for Brazil, the Netherlands, CD Lugo, Santos, Flamengo, and Torino.

== Reception ==
Reception

Aggregate scores
| Aggregator | Score |
|---|---|
| GameRankings | (PS4) 84.48% (XONE) 86.58% (PC) 59.50% |
| Metacritic | (PS4) 87/100 (XONE) 85/100 (PC) 76/100 |

Review scores
| Publication | Score |
|---|---|
| Eurogamer | 9/10 |
| Game Informer | 9/10 |
| GamePro | 90/100 |
| GameRevolution | 4/5 |
| GamesMaster | 77/100 |
| GameSpot | 9/10 |
| GamesRadar+ | 4.5/5 |
| GamesTM | 8/10 |
| IGN | 9.5/10 |
| PlayStation Official Magazine – Australia | 90/100 |
| PlayStation Official Magazine – UK | 9/10 |
| Official Xbox Magazine (UK) | 4.5/5 |
| PC Gamer (US) | 69/100 |
| Play | 9/10 |
| VideoGamer.com | 9/10 |
| The Telegraph | 5/5 |
| Metro | 9/10 |

Pro Evolution Soccer 2016 received very positive reviews, IGN scored it 9.5 out of 10, stating that "PES 2016 might well be the best football game ever made", with the reviewer going on to say "I can’t remember ever being so consistently thrilled, surprised and delighted by a football game before." They praised the physicality, and the responsive, dynamic gameplay, but criticized the uneven, repetitive commentary. GameSpot scored it 9 out of 10, referring to it as a "Return of the king". They said "almost everything in PES 2016 feels fantastic," and praised "how it wonderfully converges" the physics and AI, introducing a new dynamic physics engine with a new collision system and improved AI which includes dozens of smart individual decisions and where "players work together as a unit." They also praised the "outstanding" animations and the enhanced fluidity and control, but criticized the UI, character models, and referee lenience to some fouls. They concluded that it "represents the best game in the series since the PlayStation 2 era."

Metro scored it 9 out of 10, stating that "Pro Evolution Soccer is finally back to its best, in what is undoubtedly one of the greatest sports games of all-time." Game Informer gave the latest iteration 9 out of 10, saying that "PES 2016 represents the sport in beautiful fashion." They stated, "The off-the-ball movement to create give-and-gos are generated naturally, players find good spaces in the box and go for runs, and defenders jostle dribblers and cut out passes", adding that it is "also a much more physical game, with opposing players nipping at your feet, barging you off the ball, and getting stuck in". They concluded, "It ushers in a new era for the franchise that needs to be experienced."

== Awards ==
List of awards and nominations
| Award | Category | Result | Ref. |
|---|---|---|---|
| The Game Awards 2015 | Best Sports/Racing Game | Nominated | |
