= Metal Gear Solid V: Ground Zeroes =

2014 video game

- Developer: Kojima Productions
- Publisher: Konami Digital Entertainment
- Director: Hideo Kojima
- Producers: Hideo Kojima; Kenichiro Imaizumi; Kazuki Muraoka
- Designer: Hideo Kojima
- Programmers: Takehiro Nomura; Kotaro Oki
- Artist: Yoji Shinkawa
- Writers: Hideo Kojima; Shuyo Murata; Hidenari Inamura
- Composers: Akihiro Honda; Ludvig Forssell; Harry Gregson-Williams
- Series: Metal Gear
- Engine: Fox Engine
- Platforms: PlayStation 3; PlayStation 4; Xbox 360; Xbox One; Windows
- Release: March 18, 2014: PS3, PS4, Xbox 360; NA: March 18, 2014; EU/JP: March 20, 2014; UK: March 21, 2014; AU: March 27, 2014 Xbox One; NA: March 18, 2014; EU: March 20, 2014; UK: March 21, 2014; AU: March 27, 2014; JP: September 4, 2014 Windows; WW: December 18, 2014
- Genres: Action-adventure, stealth
- Mode: Single-player

Metal Gear Solid V: Ground Zeroes (Note: Known in Japan as Metaru Gia Soriddo Faibu Guraundo Zerozu (METAL GEAR SOLID(メタルギアソリッド)V GROUND ZEROES(グラウンド・ゼロズ); "Metal Gear Solid V: Ground Zeroes")) is a 2014 action-adventure stealth game developed by Kojima Productions and published by Konami. It is the eighth main game in the Metal Gear series directed, written, and produced by Hideo Kojima, and serves as a prologue to Metal Gear Solid V: The Phantom Pain, which was released the following year. Set in 1975, a few months after the events of Metal Gear Solid: Peace Walker, the story follows Snake (Note: Within the series' continuity, the character is recognised as having adopted the name "Big Boss". Pertaining to the games that depict the continuity where he is the protagonist/playable character, he is primarily referred to as "Snake" by the game and the characters throughout, even after adopting the name "Big Boss". Characters also refer to him as "Boss".) as he infiltrates an American black site in Cuba called Camp Omega, attempting to rescue Cipher agent Paz Ortega Andrade and former Sandinista child soldier Ricardo "Chico" Valenciano Libre.

Ground Zeroes offers new sneaking and traversal methods compared to its predecessors, as well as the choice in what order the story events take place by selecting missions in any order they chose. The game was originally developed as a mission for The Phantom Pain, but an extended development time resulted in Kojima splitting that portion of the game off into a stand-alone product so that players could get early access to Metal Gear Solid V.

Ground Zeroes was released for PlayStation 3, PlayStation 4, Xbox 360, and Xbox One in March 2014, and for Windows in December 2014. Critical reception was generally positive, with praise for its mechanics and graphics, while the majority of the criticism concerned its short length. The game was met with some controversy for its handling of themes of sexual violence. It shipped a million units by April 2014.

Metal Gear Solid V: The Definitive Experience, a bundle that includes both Ground Zeroes and The Phantom Pain, along with all additional content for both games, was released in October 2016.

== Gameplay ==
Snake avoiding a searchlight. Ground Zeroes introduces new visual mechanics that allow players to recognize threats more easily, such as this lens flare.

Players control Snake through the game map and attempt to complete missions while avoiding detection by the enemy. The threat detection system is revamped, with the removal of an on-screen meter or gauge to indicate the player that they are in the 'alert/evasion/caution' state as in previous games, which have instead been replaced by more subtle visual and audio cues. Snake's binoculars have been revamped; instead of selecting the binoculars as an item, the binoculars are hotkeyed to a button. The player is able to mark enemies and monitor their locations in the holographic display of Snake's iDroid. There are directional cues to help players when an enemy sees Snake from a distance and approaches him. A new "Reflex Mode" is triggered when an enemy finds Snake; the player only has a short window of time to take out the enemy before they fully sound the alarm. Lights can be shot out to further aid the player's stealth efforts.

Ground Zeroes features seven missions in total, locked at individual levels. After completing the main mission, the player unlocks four subsequent missions in Camp Omega (referred to as "Side Ops") set at different points in the day. These missions involve specific tasks, such as eliminating certain targets or obtaining classified information. After achieving a certain objective in the main mission, the player may unlock two additional "Extra Op" missions.

As the game is introductory in nature, being a prologue, the core story mission can be completed in a very short time frame. However, the game has many additional challenges, missions and alternative methods of play. A companion app for iOS or Android was made to help players access the in-game map and other iDroid functions on their smartphones. Console versions of the game have community features that allows a player to look at other players' performance in the game, showing where they were killed on the map.

Atmospheric weather and lighting in Ground Zeroes is mission-proprietary, meaning that the setting of the game depends on the individual mission being played. A real-time day and night cycle was originally planned for the game, but left out in favor of fully utilizing it in The Phantom Pain. Kojima has spoken about the restrictive nature of previous Metal Gear titles, saying that they "set [the player] on one rail to get from point A to point B, with a certain amount of freedom between". In contrast, Kojima's team instead offered the player new ways of traversal and sneaking methods, such as taking a jeep, a car, or a helicopter around the mission area. This was in order for Kojima to accomplish a "true open world experience" with Ground Zeroes.

== Synopsis ==
=== Setting ===
Set in March 1975, a few months after the events of Peace Walker, players control returning protagonist Snake, also known as Big Boss (Kiefer Sutherland/Akio Ōtsuka), as he works with Militaires Sans Frontières (MSF) to infiltrate an American black site on Cuban soil called Camp Omega. Once a refugee camp for people fleeing Cuba and Haiti, Camp Omega is home to an old prison that is being used for extraordinary rendition, as it has no legal recognition under the United States Constitution.

Snake's main objectives are the extraction of Paz Ortega Andrade (Tara Strong/Nana Mizuki), who has information regarding the whereabouts of the person or persons known as Cipher; and Ricardo "Chico" Valenciano Libre (Antony Del Rio/Kikuko Inoue), a Sandinista and former child soldier who was captured by Skull Face (James Horan/Takaya Hashi), the commander of paramilitary force XOF, who have assumed control of Camp Omega. Snake's mission is supported by Kazuhira "Kaz" Miller (Robin Atkin Downes/Tomokazu Sugita) and Dr. "Huey" Emmerich (Christopher Randolph/Hideyuki Tanaka) from MSF's Mother Base.

=== Plot ===
In the aftermath of the Peace Walker incident, Paz Ortega Andrade is missing and presumed dead. Under the direction of Kazuhira Miller and Huey Emmerich, Militaires Sans Frontières (MSF) prepare for an upcoming inspection by the UN amid suspicions that they possess a nuclear weapon; MSF suspects this to be an attempt by Cipher to stifle them. Their preparations are interrupted when MSF agents in Cuba investigate reports that Paz survived and has been detained at Camp Omega. To complicate matters, Ricardo "Chico" Valenciano Libre's attempt to rescue her has resulted in his capture. Believing that both of them could compromise MSF, Snake is sent to infiltrate Camp Omega to extract them if they are alive and confirm what they revealed to their captors. Snake believes rescuing Paz will convince Cipher to stand down, and that she will be willing to discuss Cipher's activities with MSF.

Snake infiltrates Camp Omega just as a mysterious Special Forces unit known as XOF departs it. He locates and extracts Chico, who claims Paz is dead. Using a recording from Chico, Snake and Miller deduce that Paz is alive, and was moved deeper into the camp. Snake locates and rescues Paz, with the group escaping via an MSF helicopter designated Morpho One. On the way to Mother Base, Chico discovers that Paz was surgically implanted with a bomb, prompting Snake and an MSF medic to remove it by hand. They arrive at Mother Base to see it in flames as XOF forces attack. Morpho One lands long enough for Snake to rescue a few staff members, including Miller, who claims that the UN inspection was nothing but a ruse for the XOF ambush, as it destroys Mother Base. As they attempt to escape XOF, Paz regains consciousness and warns them that there is a second bomb inside her. Knowing that she is about to die, she jumps out to throw herself clear of the helicopter. The resulting explosion causes Morpho One to spiral out of control and collide with a pursuing XOF helicopter.

The epilogue reveals that the United States government downplayed MSF's destruction and attempted to cover up their dealings with the organization, as did many of MSF's clients. There are no known survivors of the assault apart from Snake, Miller, and Huey. In a post-credits scene, set prior to Snake's arrival at Camp Omega, Paz is interrogated by XOF commander Skull Face, who demands the whereabouts of Cipher / Zero, as Paz had met Zero in person. Paz eventually gives in and agrees to tell him Zero's location.

Collectible audio logs reveal that Huey arranged for the United Nations to come to Mother Base against both Snake's and Miller's objections, prompting them to hide the nuclear-equipped Metal Gear ZEKE underwater. At Camp Omega, Paz and Chico are tortured, physically and psychologically, for information about the MSF base. Chico divulges the base's location and defenses to Skull Face. Paz berates Chico for giving up the information, but later records herself saying she forgives him and would not have survived the torture without him.

=== Side Ops ===
Ground Zeroes contains four additional missions, known as Side Ops, that take place in the weeks before the events of the main storyline. In the game's universe, they are labelled "pseudo-historical recreations".

In the first mission, Snake is sent to a U.S. naval prison facility in Cuba to eliminate or extract a Marine Corps sniper team hiding at the facility to avoid extradition to Laos, where they stand accused of war crimes. Suspicious about the facility's purpose, MSF stations a spy—revealed to be the series' creator, Hideo Kojima, reprising a similar cameo in Peace Walker—in the camp, who requests an emergency evacuation. Snake provides support from the air long enough for him to escape. Unable to plant another agent of their own, MSF send Snake in to make contact with an undercover informant posing as a guard. He discovers that the informant has set a trap for him, but is able to secure a recording made by the guard. With evidence that the base is an illegal black site, Snake returns in advance of an airborne assault to sabotage the facility's anti-aircraft defences. Although he is successful, the promised assault is replaced by an air strike, leaving him stranded at the base with fighter jets inbound. After escaping the Camp Omega seconds before the air strike reduces it to rubble, he and Kaz Miller speculate that the entire affair—from the camp's conversion to a black site to the aborted assault—were a series of plots orchestrated by Cipher, first to establish a compound outside any legal jurisdiction and later to disrupt Militaires Sans Frontières' operations.

== Development ==
In February 2012, a site named "Development Without Borders" owned by Konami was uploaded promoting development for a new Metal Gear title, which was titled "The 'next' MGS". The site was recruiting staff for the 2012 GDC pavilion in March, and requested applications for several positions for the latest Metal Gear Solid targeted for "high-end consoles and PC" and "next-gen Fox engine". As the year went on, screenshots and videos of the newly announced Fox Engine were unveiled by the team. This media demonstrated a range of settings and characters, none explicitly related to the Metal Gear series. Certain screenshots, however, were noted to feature a character who resembled Metal Gear's Big Boss walking up to a Stryker AFV, previously seen in Metal Gear Solid 4.

The game was announced on August 30, 2012, originally under the name of Metal Gear Solid: Ground Zeroes. It was revealed at a private function celebrating the twenty-fifth anniversary of the Metal Gear series, and made its public debut two days later at the 2012 Penny Arcade Expo. Director Hideo Kojima confirmed that Big Boss would return as the game's protagonist, and that the story would serve as a prologue to another game in the series, later revealed as Metal Gear Solid V: The Phantom Pain. It was the second game to utilize the Fox Engine after Pro Evolution Soccer 2014 the year before. In addition, Kojima confirmed that the length of the cutscenes would be reduced, as he believes that long cutscenes have become outdated. According to Famitsu, real dogs were used for motion capture during the development of the game's opening scenes, in addition to Konami confirming that part of Kojima's direction was influenced by AKB48 music videos, most notably the usage of sideways lens flares.

Ground Zeroes and The Phantom Pain were originally supposed to be released together, but The Phantom Pain's long development time resulted in Kojima splitting the project into two parts to allow players to experience the gameplay of Metal Gear Solid V prior to the full game's release. Kojima compared Ground Zeroes with the pre-title sequence in a Hollywood movie due to how it will build up the plot from The Phantom Pain. Kojima claimed that his aim was to target taboos and mature themes, which he considered to be "quite risky", adding that his roles as creator and producer were in conflict with one another; as creator, Kojima wanted to take the risk of exploring themes that might alienate audiences, but as producer, he had to be able to tone down the content in order to sell as many copies of the game as possible. Ultimately, the role of creator won out, and Kojima described his approach as "prioritising creativity over sales". Kojima has described the connections and differences between Ground Zeroes and The Phantom Pain, stating that "the advanced capabilities of the Fox Engine have allowed me to tell the new story in a new way", and that "there will be a significant difference in what The Phantom Pain brings to the series, so we want to ease players into the new open world environment and its potential", hoping to achieve that with Ground Zeroes.

The Japanese version of the game features an English text option, rendering in-game menus and subtitled dialogue in full English. This makes it possible to play the game with the Japanese voice cast accompanied by English text. The Japanese version also include an additional series of in-game audio tapes which depict Snake's first meeting with Miller, which are actually audio drama tracks previously included in the Metal Gear Solid: Peace Walker tie-in audio CD titled Blues of Peace and Kazuhira. Ground Zeroes is the first title in the series subtitled in Arabic, a feature the team had originally planned for previous games. The game also breaks away from the franchise's tradition of using licensed firearms and other military technology; instead, players use fictional weapons that bear little resemblance to real-life counterparts, such as the Marines' Type 69 rifle being reminiscent of the M-16.

== Release ==
Similarly to The Phantom Pain, Ground Zeroes was initially announced for the then-current PlayStation 3 and Xbox 360 consoles in 2011, but versions for the next generation PlayStation 4 and Xbox One consoles were announced as well in the 2012 Tokyo Game Show, where the finalized release date was also unveiled. Initially the PlayStation 3 and Xbox 360 versions would be released in both, digital and physical formats, while the PlayStation 4 and Xbox One would be receiving the title digital only. This later changed when physical versions for the PlayStation 4 and Xbox One were announced on December 10, 2013. The cover artwork would be changed between regional releases. Whereas the Japanese cover artwork depicts Snake and Miller, the Western versions only feature Snake. Kojima explained that the decision to change the cover art for the Western versions came from Konami's foreign marketing department, as they felt that consumers would not recognize Miller due to the underwhelming sales of Peace Walker on the PlayStation Portable in the West.

As part of a dual-exclusivity deal, the initial release of the two Extra Ops was locked between the PlayStation and Xbox platforms. The PlayStation 4 and PlayStation 3 versions featured the "Deja Vu" mission, in which the player must recreate scenes or events from the original Metal Gear Solid, while the Xbox One and Xbox 360 versions featured the "Jamais Vu" mission, in which the player controls Raiden as he appears in Metal Gear Rising: Revengeance, as he is tasked with eliminating a group of bioroids who have infiltrated the base disguised as human soldiers (a homage to Kojima's earlier game Snatcher). Both Extra Ops were made available on all four platforms as a part of the Version 1.02 update patch on May 1, 2014.

Ground Zeroes was released in Japan for the PlayStation 4, PlayStation 3 and Xbox 360 on March 20, 2014. Because of the late launch of the Xbox One in Japan, its version was released several months later on September 4 in digital format only. As with previous Metal Gear Solid installments, a limited "Premium Package" edition was produced and sold by Amazon Japan. This edition was sold in a box featuring hand-drawn artwork by Yoji Shinkawa, which contained the game itself, a Revoltech Yamaguchi action figure of Snake in his Ground Zeroes garb, and a special edition of the Peace Walker novelization written by Hitori Nojima featuring exclusive artwork not in the stand-alone edition. The Australian and New Zealand release of Ground Zeroes was delayed to March 27. It was reported that various New Zealand retailers had delayed their release dates and contacted Konami, who confirmed the situation. On August 13, 2014, Konami announced that Ground Zeroes, along with The Phantom Pain, would be released for Windows via Steam. Ground Zeroes was released on December 18, 2014, while The Phantom Pain was released on Steam on September 1, 2015.

Metal Gear Solid V: The Definitive Experience, a complete edition that includes Ground Zeroes and The Phantom Pain in one bundle, was released for the PlayStation 4, Xbox One and Windows (via Steam) in 2016. It includes both Extra Ops on all three platforms, as well as the option to immediately start The Phantom Pain after completing the main mission.

== Reception ==
=== Critical reception ===
Reception

Aggregate score
Aggregator	Score
Metacritic	(PC) 80/100 (XONE) 76/100 (PS4) 75/100 (PS3) 66/100

Review scores
Publication	Score
Computer and Video Games	7/10
Electronic Gaming Monthly	5.0/10
Eurogamer	9/10
Famitsu	38/40
Game Informer	7.00/10
GameSpot	8/10
Giant Bomb	4/5
IGN	8.0/10
Joystiq	3.5/5
PlayStation Official Magazine – UK	8/10
Official Xbox Magazine (US)	7.5/10
Polygon	5.5/10

Metal Gear Solid V: Ground Zeroes received "generally favorable" reviews from critics on all platforms except on PlayStation 3 which received "mixed or average" reviews, according to review aggregator website Metacritic.

GameSpot felt that the new stealth mechanics in Ground Zeroes, such as the replacement of the radar and other indicators with binoculars and radio communication, made its overall gameplay more "immersive" than previous installments, noting that "nothing is simply handed to you, and Ground Zeroes is a far more tense and rewarding experience for it". Its open world format and side missions were also praised for adding a large amount of flexibility and replay value to the game, concluding that "though it's unusual for everything to take place in a single location, there's so much to do and see, and whether you take a stealthy or head-on approach, infiltrating Camp Omega is a thrilling experience that shouldn't be missed". IGN shared similar praise, describing it as a "stripped down" game which "avoids lengthy cutscenes, climactic boss fights, and the usual frayed and tangled plot strands in favour of smart, tactical gameplay". The length of the main campaign was noted as being short, but it was acknowledged that while the array of side missions and bonus objectives may only appeal to "score-chasers", "there's certainly plenty of content here to satisfy". Robert Rath, a columnist at The Escapist, praised the emphasis on collecting information over gunfights and combat, saying "Ground Zeroes is the first MGS game to live up to its subtitle and actually allow you to conduct tactical espionage operations." James Stephanie Sterling of The Escapist praised the gameplay and expressed anticipation for Metal Gear Solid V: The Phantom Pain, but was highly critical of its length, describing it as a game demo and expressing shock that Konami had seen fit to sell.

Polygon was more critical, considering it "staggeringly short and unsatisfying, feeling more like a cash grab than an honest-to-goodness installment in a beloved franchise". Although praising its overall audiovisual design and attention to detail, Ground Zeroes was criticized for the changes made to its stealth mechanics, its "half-baked" action sequences, and the extremely short length of the game's main campaign, which was further criticized for being "dull" and "underwhelming".

While giving the game a high score in her review for IGN, Lucy O'Brien was highly critical of the use of sexual violence as a plot device. Collectible tapes in the game describe how Paz is sexually assaulted and tortured, including the insertion of a second bomb into her vagina or anus, and how underage boy Chico is forced to have sex with her. O'Brien described how the introduction of this part of the plot through collectibles effectively made them a reward for players. Several other writers criticized the use of sexual violence, describing it as a failure to portray rape in a meaningful way, as an example of acceptance of sexualized violence in video games, or as a reinforcement of rape culture. The game's ESRB rating of Mature contains a rare "Sexual Violence" description due to this, becoming the first video game to contain this since Animamundi: Dark Alchemist in 2006, and the first ever console game to receive it.

=== Sales ===
During the first week of release in Japan, the PlayStation 3 version of the game sold 119,615 physical retail copies, ranking third place amongst all Japanese software sales within that week, whilst the PlayStation 4 version sold 91,903 physical retail copies. On 25 April 2014, Konami announced that the game shipped one million copies worldwide. The PlayStation 4 version has sold three times more than the Xbox One version. No official numbers were given on the sales of the Steam version; however, Konami has stated that sales of Ground Zeroes were "solid" on the PC platform.
