= Metal Gear Solid V: The Phantom Pain =

2015 video game

- Developer: Kojima Productions (Note: Metal Gear Online 3 developed by Kojima Productions Los Angeles)
- Publisher: Konami Digital Entertainment
- Director: Hideo Kojima
- Producers: Hideo Kojima; Kenichiro Imaizumi; Kazuki Muraoka
- Designer: Hideo Kojima
- Programmer: Daizaburo Nakamura
- Artist: Yoji Shinkawa
- Writers: Hideo Kojima; Shuyo Murata; Hidenari Inamura; Etsu Tamari
- Composers: Ludvig Forssell; Justin Burnett; Harry Gregson-Williams; Daniel James
- Series: Metal Gear
- Engine: Fox Engine
- Platforms: PlayStation 3; PlayStation 4; Windows; Xbox 360; Xbox One
- Release: September 1, 2015
- Genres: Action-adventure, stealth
- Modes: Single-player, multiplayer

Metal Gear Solid V: The Phantom Pain (Note: Japanese: METAL GEAR SOLID(メタルギアソリッド)V THE PHANTOM PAIN(ファントムペイン), Hepburn: Metaru Gia Soriddo Faibu Fantomu Pein) is a 2015 action-adventure stealth game developed and published by Konami. Directed, written, and produced by Hideo Kojima (as his final work at Konami), it is the ninth main installment in the Metal Gear franchise, following Metal Gear Solid V: Ground Zeroes, a stand-alone prologue released the previous year. Set in 1984, nine years after the events of Ground Zeroes, the story follows mercenary leader Punished "Venom" Snake as he ventures into Soviet-occupied Afghanistan and the Angola–Zaire border region to exact revenge on those who destroyed his forces and almost killed him during the climax of Ground Zeroes.

The game is played from a third-person perspective in an open world which can be explored either on foot or by other modes of transport. Snake can use a wide repertoire of weapons and items, and receive assistance from several AI companions, allowing the player to combat enemies either stealthily or directly. Enemy soldiers and resources found in the world can be transported to Snake's headquarters, allowing for its expansion and the development of further technology. The game includes two separate multiplayer modes, Metal Gear Online (also known as Metal Gear Online 3) and Forward Operating Bases (FOBs); the latter mode allows players to develop FOBs, which can then be invaded by other players.

Metal Gear Solid V: The Phantom Pain was released for PlayStation 3, PlayStation 4, Windows, Xbox 360, and Xbox One on September 1, 2015. It received critical acclaim, with praise for its gameplay, open world, graphics, themes, and performances. Its narrative and certain changes to the series formula divided critics, while the appearance of the character Quiet drew criticism. The game's repeated missions, ending, and evidence of removed content led some to label it unfinished. The Phantom Pain shipped 6 million units by December 2015. It received several awards and is considered to be one of the greatest video games ever made. Metal Gear Solid V: The Definitive Experience, a bundle that includes both The Phantom Pain and Ground Zeroes, along with all additional content for both games, was released in October 2016.

== Gameplay ==
Metal Gear Solid V: The Phantom Pain is a stealth game in which players take the role of Punished "Venom" Snake from a third-person perspective in an open world. Gameplay elements are largely unchanged from Ground Zeroes, meaning that players must stealthily traverse several areas in the game world, avoiding enemy guards and remaining undetected. Included in Snake's repertoire are binoculars, a variety of weapons, explosives, and stealth-based items such as cardboard boxes and decoys. Following one of the series traditions, The Phantom Pain encourages players to progress through the game without killing, using non-lethal weapons such as tranquilizer darts to subdue enemies. Players may traverse the game world with vehicles such as jeeps and tanks, in addition to traveling on foot or on horseback, and as certain locations are mountainous, players may opt to go rock climbing as a shortcut. They may call for helicopter support against enemy soldiers or request airstrikes that can bombard the target area or change the weather. Snake can call on one of a few AI "buddy" companions: D-Horse, a horse capable of wearing armor and hiding Snake during travel; D-Dog, a wolf pup raised to assist Snake in the field; Quiet, a mute female sniper with supernatural abilities; and D-Walker, a piloted, highly agile mobile weapons platform that can provide heavy weapons support. The companions' abilities and their effectiveness depends on the player's relationship with them. There is a large emphasis on tactics in The Phantom Pain.

In this screenshot, Snake uses the Fulton surface-to-air recovery system to transport a sheep back to Mother Base.

As in Metal Gear Solid: Peace Walker, The Phantom Pain features a base-building system that allows players to develop weapons and items from their headquarters, Mother Base. Recruitment of enemy soldiers and prisoners has returned for this purpose, allowing the base to grow through organization. The player is given the option to access their base from their real-life smartphones and other devices via a companion app. Unlike in Peace Walker, where players can only view Mother Base from the air, The Phantom Pain allows players to control Snake as he explores the complex on foot. The Fulton surface-to-air recovery system, an item introduced into gameplay in Peace Walker, returns as well, with players able to transport captured soldiers and other objects such as animals and vehicles back to Mother Base. An in-game currency called GMP is used for upgrading Mother Base's defenses and technology, and can be collected from objects found all over the map, such as rough diamonds, shipping containers, and special blueprint boxes, as well as sending recruited soldiers on combat missions around the world. The income is invested in upgrades to the appearance and abilities, weapons and equipment of Snake, his companions, and vehicles. For example, Snake's prosthetic arm can be modified with a taser, echolocation function, or remote controls that allow it to fly as a missile-like drone.

Game design direction allows the player to choose in what order the story events take place by selecting missions in any order they like, and yet still "understand the encompassing message by the end". The enemy AI has improved in terms of situational awareness. If players frequently use particular weapons or tactics to subdue enemy soldiers, enemies will increase in number and be outfitted with better equipment; for example, frequent use of headshots will result in enemy soldiers donning metal helmets to make targeting the head harder. Other actions from the player can affect the wider game world further; for example, sabotaging a radar installation will open up a new landing zone.

The game has a dynamic weather system and day-night cycle that runs in real-time. The cycle is able to be fast-forwarded when Snake lights a "Phantom Cigar", a type of electronic cigar; a digital silver Seiko watch panel appears on screen to denote time. The passage of time enables players to analyze the movement of marked enemy forces in the area, such as shifts in sentry patrols and individual patrol routes. Weather conditions, such as sandstorms and rain, affect the gameplay environment by reducing visibility or masking the sound of footsteps.

=== Multiplayer ===
Metal Gear Solid V: The Phantom Pain includes two multiplayer modes: first, the new Metal Gear Online 3, developed by Kojima Productions' newly formed Los Angeles division (now known as Konami Los Angeles Studio). The second multiplayer mode is an extension of the Mother Base base-building feature. Players are able to expand their operations to include Forward Operating Bases, which can be used to generate resources and income for the single-player campaign. These facilities can be attacked by other players, making a player-versus-player mode available whereby the attacking team attempts to steal resources and/or soldiers and the defending team tries to protect the Forward Operating Base from the intruder. Defenders are able to call on their friends to aid in the defense, especially if their Forward Operating Base is attacked during a story mission. Players are able to customize the security, staffing, and layout of their Forward Operating Bases, allowing for a large number of compound configurations. Following the success or failure of the intrusion, the location of the attacking player's Forward Operating Base is revealed to the defending player; however, defending players can only launch a retaliatory strike if the attacker was discovered during their infiltration. The Forward Operating Base feature is a separate multiplayer experience to Metal Gear Online 3 and is needed to increase the number of combat units the player can deploy.

== Synopsis ==
=== Setting ===
In the aftermath of the events of Ground Zeroes and the destruction of Militaires Sans Frontières (MSF), Big Boss (Kiefer Sutherland/Akio Ōtsuka) falls into a coma. Nine years later, he awakens and helps lead a new mercenary group, Diamond Dogs. Adopting the codename "Venom Snake", he ventures into Afghanistan during the Soviet–Afghan War and the Angola—Zaire border region during the Angolan Civil War to track down the people responsible for MSF's destruction. Along the way, he becomes reacquainted with his former rival Ocelot (Troy Baker/Satoshi Mikami) and encounters Quiet (Stefanie Joosten), an assassin and sniper with supernatural abilities. While he and Kazuhira Miller (Robin Atkin Downes/Tomokazu Sugita) are initially driven to exact revenge, Snake unearths a plot by the Cipher organization to develop a new model of the Metal Gear system known as the ST-84 "Sahelanthropus".

=== Characters ===
In contrast to previous Metal Gear installments, Kojima Productions conducted the voice acting and motion capture with English-speaking actors and stuntmen first. While facial motion capture was used before for Metal Gear Solid 4: Guns of the Patriots, it was done separately from the actual voice acting. The Japanese voice acting was dubbed over the English cast's performance afterward, in contrast to previous releases in the series since Metal Gear Solid 2: Sons of Liberty, which had the characters' vocal and facial expressions lip-synched specifically to both Japanese and English voice acting.

At E3 2013, Konami confirmed that actor Kiefer Sutherland would provide Snake's voice and motion capture work for the game, taking a role over voice actor David Hayter. Kojima's reason for replacing Hayter was to "have a more subdued performance expressed through subtle facial movements and tone of voice rather than words", and that he "needed someone who could genuinely convey both the facial and vocal qualities of a man in his late 40s". Hollywood producer and director Avi Arad suggested to Kojima that Sutherland could fulfill his requirements. Akio Ōtsuka was unaffected by this casting change and continued to voice Snake in the Japanese version. On March 4, 2015, Kojima revealed that Snake would have less dialogue in The Phantom Pain than previous installments. The reasoning behind it was to make Snake come across as an extension to the player and that he "will act based on [player's actions] rather than doing things like making spontaneous comments or flirting with women."

Other members of the voice cast include Troy Baker as Ocelot, Jay Tavare as Code Talker, James Horan as Skull Face, Robin Atkin Downes as Kazuhira Miller, Christopher Randolph as Dr. Emmerich, and Piers Stubbs as Eli. The Japanese dub features Tomokazu Sugita as Miller, Hideyuki Tanaka as Emmerich, Takaya Hashi as Skull Face, Satoshi Mikami as Ocelot, Osamu Saka (whose previous roles include Sergei Gurlukovich in Metal Gear Solid 2: Sons of Liberty and The End in Metal Gear Solid 3: Snake Eater) as Code Talker, and Yūtarō Honjō as Eli. Dutch model Stefanie Joosten provides the likeness, voice and motion capture for the new character Quiet, a mute sniper with supernatural abilities who may assist Snake on missions depending on the player's actions during a certain mission. She provides the vocals for "Quiet's Theme".

=== Plot ===
In 1984, nine years after the destruction of MSF, (Note: As depicted in Metal Gear Solid V: Ground Zeroes) Big Boss awakens from a coma in a hospital on a British military base in Cyprus. Quiet, a Cipher assassin, attempts to kill him, but he is rescued by a heavily bandaged man called "Ishmael". The pair escape the hospital while evading pursuit from Cipher soldiers and two superhumans, the "Third Child" and the "Man on Fire". Big Boss loses Ishmael, but is recovered by Revolver Ocelot and brought aboard Diamond Dogs, a new mercenary group founded by Kazuhira Miller on an offshore platform near Seychelles.

Big Boss adopts the code name "Venom Snake" and begins searching for Cipher. Snake becomes involved in the Soviet–Afghan War and the Angolan Civil War. He recruits the superhuman mute sniper Quiet; scientist and MSF associate Dr. "Huey" Emmerich; and Code Talker, a Navajo expert on parasites forced to work for Cipher. Snake captures Eli, a British child believed to be a clone of Snake and the leader of several child soldiers; a DNA test confirms that Venom Snake and Eli are not genetically related.

Snake learns that Cipher's leader Zero was usurped and XOF, a rogue faction of Cipher, was responsible for destroying MSF. XOF's leader Skull Face considers Cipher's plan for world peace akin to making it culturally American, and intends to release a parasite that kills anyone who speaks English; a modified parasite gave Quiet and XOF's elite soldiers their unusual abilities. After releasing the English strain, Skull Face plans to use the threat of the latest Metal Gear "Sahelanthropus" to make nuclear weapons desirable, believing that nuclear deterrence will attain world peace while protecting other cultures; in secret, he will retain control of the weapons. Skull Face refuses to use an AI for Sahelanthropus, so is dependent on the Third Child's psychic abilities.

During a test, the Third Child betrays Skull Face, having Sahelanthropus seriously wound him and crush the Man on Fire. Snake defeats Sahelanthropus and recovers two of Skull Face's three parasite vials to destroy them; the third is missing, while one of those recovered is taken by the Third Child and given to Eli. Skull Face is left to die by Snake and Miller, but Huey executes him. Sahelanthropus is brought to Mother Base. Eli, the Third Child, and the child soldiers later steal Sahelanthropus and flee. It is revealed that the Third Child's powers enthralled him to the will of the most vengeful person nearby, meaning that Sahelanthropus' attack was instigated by Eli.

A parasite epidemic occurs on base, forcing Snake to kill many of his men to contain it. To honor them, he has their cremated remains turned into diamonds to carry into battle. Huey is accused of causing the epidemic while attempting to mutate the parasites to sell as weapons. Alongside suspicion of his role in MSF's destruction and evidence that he murdered his wife Dr. Strangelove for preventing him from using their son Hal in experiments, Snake exiles him from Diamond Dogs.

Quiet disappears in Afghanistan. Code Talker reveals that Quiet was infected with the English parasite to spread it within Diamond Dogs, but her allegiances shifted and she remained silent to prevent an outbreak. Huey's mutation of the parasites convinced Quiet that she could not guarantee the group's safety. Snake finds her and helps fight off Soviet forces before they hide. Quiet is forced to speak to summon a Diamond Dogs helicopter when Snake is bitten by a venomous snake, and flees into the desert to prevent another epidemic.

It is revealed that Venom Snake is not Big Boss, but a medic injured alongside Big Boss (Ishmael) during the destruction of MSF. During his coma, the medic was transformed via plastic surgery and hypnotherapy to serve as a body decoy while Big Boss wages a covert war. Miller and Ocelot discuss Big Boss' plans to create Outer Heaven. Ocelot remains supportive, while Miller is disgusted at the deception and vows to assist Big Boss's son David in hopes of contributing to the downfall. Venom Snake would go on to set the events of the Outer Heaven uprising in motion, resulting in his death. Big Boss would then resurface during the Zanzibar Land disturbance.

== Development ==
A recruiting poster, based on the Lord Kitchener Wants You recruitment poster, used at GDC 2012

In February 2012, a site owned by Konami, "Development Without Borders", promoted development for a new Metal Gear title, for "The 'next' MGS". The site was recruiting staff for the 2012 GDC pavilion in March, and requested applications for several positions for the latest Metal Gear Solid targeted for "high-end consoles" and a "next-gen Fox engine". As the year went on, screenshots and videos of the newly announced Fox Engine were unveiled by the team. This media demonstrated many random settings and characters, although none related to the Metal Gear series. Certain screenshots, however, were noted to feature a character who resembled the Big Boss character of Metal Gear, walking up to a Stryker AFV previously seen in Metal Gear Solid 4.

Konami unveiled Ground Zeroes at a private function celebrating the twenty-fifth anniversary of the Metal Gear series on August 30, 2012. The game made its public debut two days later at the 2012 Penny Arcade Expo. Kojima revealed very little detail about the project at the time other than that it was a prologue to Metal Gear Solid V, and that it would be the first game to use the Fox Engine, a game engine developed by Kojima Productions. In January 2013, Kojima revealed that Ground Zeroes would be the first title in the series to be subtitled in Arabic, a feature the team had planned for previous games. He also confirmed that the length of the cutscenes was reduced, as he believed that long cutscenes had become outdated.

In an interview with VG247, Kojima expressed concerns over whether or not Ground Zeroes would be released. He claimed that his aim was to target taboos and mature themes, which he considered to be "quite risky", adding that his roles as creator and producer were in conflict with one another; as creator, Kojima wanted to take the risk of exploring themes that might alienate audiences, but as producer, he had to be able to tone down the content in order to sell as many copies of the game as possible. Ultimately, the role of creator won out, and Kojima described his approach as "prioritizing creativity over sales".

Poster distributed at E3 2013, with visual effects by Kyle Cooper

At the Spike Video Game Awards in December 2012, a teaser trailer for a game known as The Phantom Pain was shown, credited to a new Swedish developer known as Moby Dick Studio, and was described as being "100% gameplay". Allegedly led by Joakim Mogren, the studio's mission statement read that it aimed to "deliver an uncompromising, exciting, and touching game experience to people all around the globe". After the presentation, commentators speculated that The Phantom Pain was actually a Metal Gear game, noting the protagonist's resemblance to Big Boss, graphics similar to those produced by the Fox Engine, the quote "V has come to" at the end of the trailer, and that the title Metal Gear Solid V fits in the negative space and indentations of the game's logo when using the same font. The name "Joakim" was an anagram of "Kojima", the domain name for the studio's website had only been registered about two weeks prior to the announcement, and that several people wearing Moby Dick Studio shirts were sitting in a VIP area intended for Konami staff. Kojima stated he was impressed by the trailer and how Mogren was inspired by Metal Gear.

An actor playing a heavily bandaged Mogren appeared in an interview on the March 14, 2013 episode of GameTrailers TV; while stating that he could not reveal many details, he confirmed that more details about The Phantom Pain would be revealed at the upcoming Game Developers Conference, and showed a series of screenshots on an iPad to the show's host Geoff Keighley. After Keighley pointed out the Fox Engine logo in the screenshots, Mogren appeared nervous and the segment abruptly ended.

On March 27, 2013, at GDC 2013, Kojima confirmed that his studio was behind the trailer, and announced that Metal Gear Solid V would be two separate games; Ground Zeroes would now serve as a prologue for the main game, which was officially announced as Metal Gear Solid V: The Phantom Pain. He subsequently presented a trailer for the game and showcased the Fox Engine. The trailer featured the song "Not Your Kind of People" from Garbage's 2012 album of the same name.

In an interview with GameTrailers on March 29, 2013, Kojima revealed that The Phantom Pain was initially presented as an independent game so as to assess the public and industry response to the Fox Engine, as he felt that announcing the game as part of Metal Gear Solid V would bias reactions to the engine. He stated the idea had been conceived and planned with Keighley over the course of two years and was designed to encourage social media activity from fans.

While the official trailer announcing the game was running on a PC, the game was released for the seventh and eighth generations of video game consoles. In an interview during E3 2013, when asked about a PC release, Kojima stated: "We are making it, and it will be on par with the PlayStation 4 and Xbox One versions." However, he made it clear that the PC port was not their priority. Kojima confirmed that the visuals seen in the trailer would look close to those in the final game. He also stated that he would like Metal Gear Solid V to be his final Metal Gear game, noting that unlike previous titles where he had announced that he had finished making games in the series, only to return for subsequent games, his involvement with the franchise would be over this time around. Although the trailer had Snake suffering from hallucinations in the form of a flaming whale, Kojima assured that there would be a balance in realism.

At E3 2013, a fourth trailer was shown at the Microsoft press conference, demonstrating the new gameplay mechanics, as well as the cast of characters. The development of an Xbox One version was also announced at the conference. The PlayStation 4 version was announced the following day when Konami uploaded the red band version of the trailer on their YouTube channel in addition to the standard green band version.

The trailers for Metal Gear Solid V showed the game running on a PC hardware, but according to Kojima with textures and character models somewhat based on seventh generation hardware. The developers aimed to improve the technical quality for the versions released for the eighth generation of consoles.

"This time, Snake won't really speak much at all. Metal Gear Solid V: The Phantom Pain is an open world game focused on giving freedom to the player who will drive Snake's actions. Snake himself will be more of a silent protagonist similar to Mad Max in Mad Max 2. It's the characters around him who will expand the story."

— Hideo Kojima

Kojima alluded to the game possibly being "too big to clear", adding that the game is "200 [times larger] than Ground Zeroes". He spoke about the restrictive nature of previous Metal Gear Solid titles, saying that they "set [the player] on one rail to get from point A to point B, with a certain amount of freedom between". In stark contrast, The Phantom Pain offers players new ways of traversal and sneaking methods, such as taking a helicopter to the mission area. Players are able to traverse the game world or deploy directly to landing zones that allow for different approaches. A video published after the E3 2015 convention showcased this, with the same mission played four times in a number of different ways: with the player opting for stealth, launching a direct assault via helicopter gunship, attempting to assassinate a target with a sniper rifle, and smuggling an explosive device into an enemy base by way of an unsuspecting patrol vehicle crew. Weapons are unlicensed and fictional in The Phantom Pain, just as they were in Ground Zeroes. It was confirmed that players who have previously played Ground Zeroes are able to import save data into The Phantom Pain and gain special perks.

Kojima wanted the player to connect with Snake in The Phantom Pain. To accomplish this, the loss of Mother Base, which the player developed throughout Peace Walker, would serve as motivation for revenge for both Snake and the player. Kojima also tried making Snake more relatable to newcomers of the series by making him unaware of what happened in the nine years during which he was in a coma.

At E3 2014, a fifth trailer featuring Mike Oldfield's song "Nuclear" was shown, unveiling more plot details surrounding the Diamond Dogs and Snake's antagonistic descent. It was leaked a day earlier via an accidental post from Konami's YouTube channel. Alongside the new trailer, the website for Metal Gear Solid V was updated and included new information and images such as the developmental progress of the in-game map and the evolution of Snake's design across all games in the series. On August 25, 2015, Kojima released a launch trailer showing "Metal Gear's Evolution and Harmony" with clips from the previous games along with the reveal of the new "Metal Gear Sahelanthropus".

The first footage for The Phantom Pain's multiplayer was revealed in December 2014. While originally set for launch alongside the release of the game, Metal Gear Online was postponed to October 6 for consoles and January 2016 for Windows.

During development, Kojima Productions and Konami attracted criticism for their decision to include microtransactions; a system that allows players to pay for access to in-game content. However, a spokesperson for Kojima Productions confirmed that the system was included to benefit players who may not have the time to complete the game, given its scale, and that no content would be available exclusively through microtransactions. Further controversy emerged following the publication of an article claiming that the Forward Operating Base mode was behind a paywall, which Konami refuted, saying that microtransactions acted as an accelerator rather than a paywall.

Over $80 million was spent on the development of the game.

=== Music ===
The music of The Phantom Pain was produced by Harry Gregson-Williams, making it his fourth Metal Gear title, and composed by Ludvig Forssell, Justin Burnett, and Daniel James. Also featured in The Phantom Pain are collectable music tapes the player can listen to in-game, with a mixture of licensed music from the era and music from past Metal Gear titles.

Metal Gear Solid V Original Soundtrack was released on September 2, 2015, containing 50 tracks selected from both Ground Zeroes and The Phantom Pain. Following this on December 23, 2015, was Metal Gear Solid V Extended Soundtrack, containing 114 tracks again selected from both Metal Gear Solid V games. Metal Gear Solid V Original Soundtrack The Lost Tapes was released on March 30, 2016, primarily consisting of tracks written by Ludvig Forssell for the in-game cassette tapes. The latter two releases also include music that went unused in the game, with Metal Gear Solid V Extended Soundtrack in particular containing two tracks from the cut "Mission 51: Kingdom of the Flies".

The game's soundtrack later won the award for Best Score/Soundtrack at The Game Awards 2015. The event had Stefanie Joosten, Quiet's voice actress, on stage performing "Quiet's Theme".

=== Konami–Kojima dispute ===
In March 2015, Konami announced plans separate from Hideo Kojima and his development studio Kojima Productions. Kojima's name was removed from the game cover, all of its associated paraphernalia, and future releases of Metal Gear Solid V: Ground Zeroes and Metal Gear Solid: The Legacy Collection. (Note: Gameplay videos have shown Kojima's name included within the game itself, with individual credits sequences for each mission.) A Konami spokesperson stated that Kojima would still be involved with Konami and the Metal Gear franchise.

In July 2015, series composer Rika Muranaka told Metal Gear Central in an interview that over 30 commissioned songs for the series were never used, with Muranaka believing that Kojima had a lack of business sense that played a part in his split from Konami.

In August 2015, a marketing executive with Konami described the series as a key franchise for the company and said they intended to produce additional games.

== Release ==
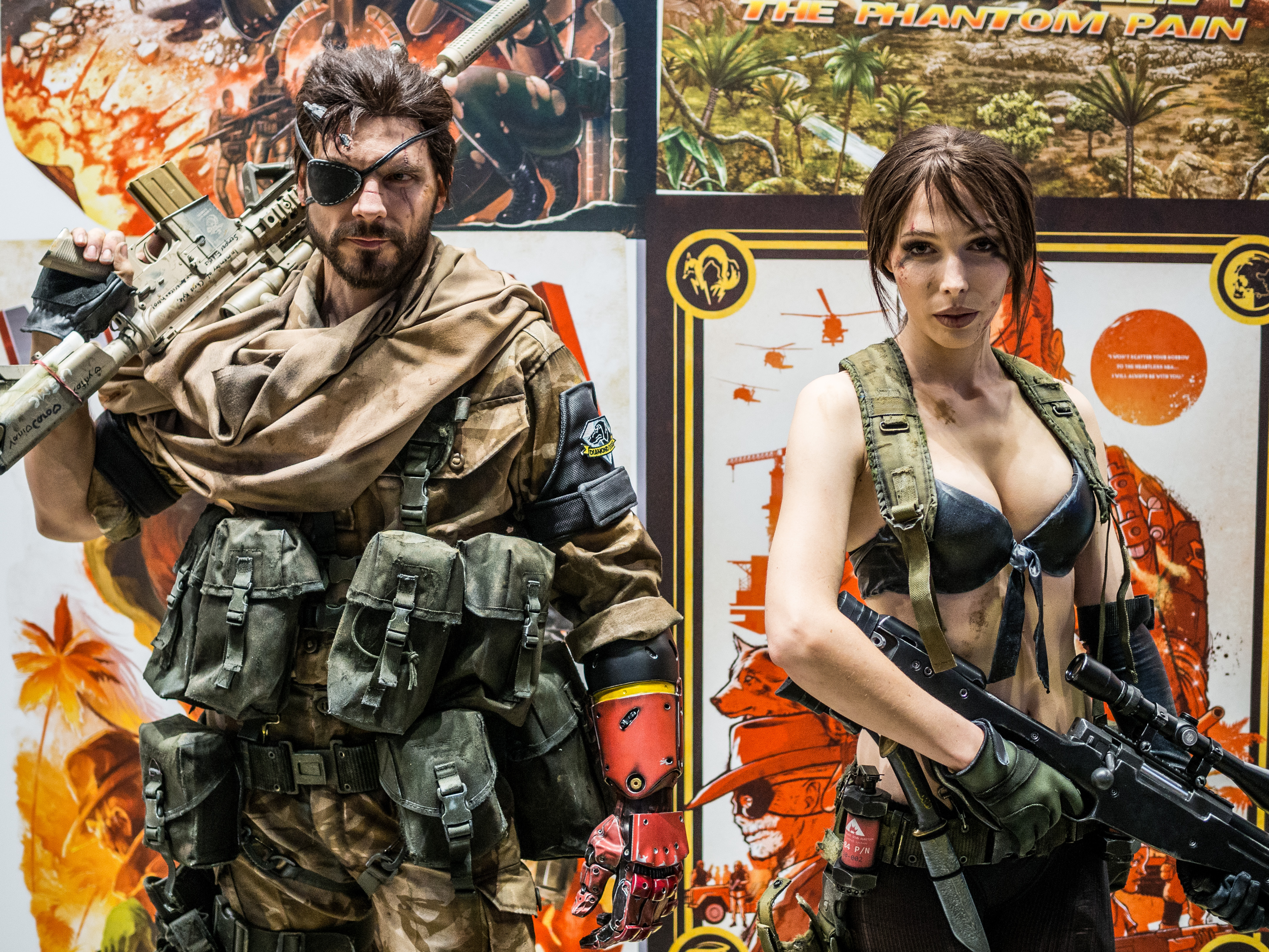
Promotion at Gamescom 2015

Metal Gear Solid V: The Phantom Pain was released in different editions. Special Day One editions of the game for each platform featured downloadable content (DLC) vouchers for special weapons and Metal Gear Online experience points. The North American Collector's Edition (which was available for PS4 and Xbox One) comes with a steelbook and a small-size replica of Snake's bionic arm; the Premium Package for the Japanese release (which was available for PS4, PS3, and Xbox One) features a full-size replica, which was also sold separately in May 2016. Sony released a PlayStation 4 bundle with the unit painted in the colors of the arm.

The physical PC release of The Phantom Pain only includes a CD key and a disc with a Steam installer contained within. Game files are not included on-disc and must be downloaded.

Tie-in products were released for the game. Sony Mobile Communications released special edition Walkman, Xperia Z4, Xperia Z3 Tablet Compact, and Xperia J Compact devices, each featuring Outer Heaven emblems, soundtrack audio, and wallpapers. Watch manufacturer Seiko released a digital watch resembling Venom Snake's watch from the game. Eyeglass maker JF Rey produced themed eyewear patterned after what Kaz and Ocelot wear in the game. Japanese toy company Sentinel, which previously made an iDroid casing for the iPhone 5 and 5S, produced a transformable figure of the Sahelanthropus, while Kotobukiya readied a 1/100 scale kit of the unit. Sports apparel company Puma joined the project through a line of sports jackets, T-shirts, and footwear, including Snake's sneaking boots.

Square Enix's PlayArts Kai figure line featured several of the game's characters, while Kaiyodo produced Venom Snake and a Soviet Army soldier for the RevoMini figure category. A Japanese language novelization of The Phantom Pain was written by author Kenji Yano (under the pen name Hitori Nojima) and published by Kadokawa Shoten in bunkobon and e-book formats on October 25, 2015, following the author's two-part novelization of the original Metal Gear Solid and Metal Gear Solid 2: Sons of Liberty published the prior two months. An art book, titled The Art of Metal Gear Solid V, was published by Dark Horse Comics on November 2, 2016.

A complete edition of the game, titled Metal Gear Solid V: The Definitive Experience, (Note: Or Metal Gear Solid V: Ground Zeroes + The Phantom Pain in Japan) was released for PlayStation 4, Xbox One and Steam on October 11 in North America, October 13 in Europe, and November 10 in Japan. The bundle includes the Ground Zeroes prologue and The Phantom Pain in one package, along with all previously released downloadable content for both games.

=== Removed content ===
The Collector's Edition of the game includes a supplemental disc containing a video for an unused in-game mission titled "Episode 51: Kingdom of the Flies", depicting said mission's events through unfinished cinematics and concept artwork. Taking place after the end of the campaign, it sees Snake locating and confronting Eli and the stolen Sahelanthropus on a remote island. The official story ending was criticized for feeling abrupt, (Note: Attributed to multiple sources:) and critics felt that Episode 51 would have given the game a more satisfying conclusion from it resolving several plot threads. Others also thought it allowed certain characters further development that tied into their previous appearances in the series.

Some critics found fault with The Phantom Pain's structure. The requirement of replaying missions during its second half to progress resulted in theories that they had been used in place of original content that had not been incorporated due to time constraints. This was supported by further evidence of removed content: shortly after the discovery of Episode 51, Facepunch forum users who had been extracting data from the game's PC version found evidence of another story chapter that was not included in the final version. On Twitter, the game's producer Kenichiro Imaizumi refused to comment on fans' enquiries, while Metal Gear Solid community manager Robert Allen Peeler refuted the possibility of story downloadable content. Some fans theorized a link between Chapter 3 and Konami's "Nuclear Disarmament Event", which was opened shortly after launch with the goal of revealing a secret in the game once all in-game nuclear weapons manufactured by players were disposed of; a cutscene linked with the event had been discovered by data miners some days after the game's release. Peeler did not deny that further events may occur once the disarmament had concluded, but stated that "the simplest answer is... the correct one, no need to overthink it." In 2018 and 2020, despite there being player nukes in existence at the time, the completion of the Nuclear Disarmament Event was triggered on the Steam version of the game, resulting in the release of the aforementioned cutscene; Konami confirmed these were the result of a technical error in the game's servers, and the work of a cheater, respectively.

Critics attributed the missing content to the disclosed tensions between Konami and Kojima during development. The general consensus was that Konami had given deadlines for the game's release, owing to Kojima's increasing spending on development. (Note: Attributed to multiple sources:) Data miners uncovered other examples of content that had not been included in the game, ranging from gameplay features to audio files. Jorge Jimenez of PC Gamer wrote it was possible that content had been cut for other expected reasons. Due to the perceived narrative flaws and evidence of removed story content, the game was labeled by critics as being unfinished. (Note: Attributed to multiple sources:) Conversely, GamesRadar+'s Dan Dawkins argued that what fans saw as being unfinished could have been deliberate on Kojima's part, and wrote that claims of the game being incomplete were neither right nor wrong. Speaking to IGN, Kojima stated that the new intellectual property he was developing since leaving Konami (later revealed as Death Stranding) would be "a complete game". After the announcement of Metal Gear Solid V: The Definitive Experience in 2016, which would include all previously released downloadable content, several fans voiced their concerns on Twitter about the missing content, particularly with regards to Episode 51. Konami responded that Episode 51 had been removed in the early development stages of the game as it had not been intended to be a pivotal story ending. In 2021, PC Gamer's Jorge Jimenez and Collider's Ernesto Valenzuela expressed the desire for a director's cut of the game with the removed content, though feeling that the possibility of one would be very unlikely.

== Reception ==
=== Critical reception ===
Reception

Aggregate score
Aggregator	Score
Metacritic	(XONE) 95/100 (PS4) 93/100 (PC) 91/100

Review scores
Publication	Score
Destructoid	9/10
Electronic Gaming Monthly	9.5/10
Eurogamer	9/10
Famitsu	40/40
Game Informer	9.25/10
GameRevolution	4.5/5
GameSpot	10/10
GamesTM	10/10
Giant Bomb	5/5
IGN	10/10
Official Xbox Magazine (UK)	10/10
PC Gamer (US)	93/100
Polygon	9/10
USgamer	4.5/5
Digital Spy	5/5
PlayStation LifeStyle	10/10
The Guardian	5/5
The Independent	5/5
The Daily Telegraph	5/5
Time	5/5

Metal Gear Solid V: The Phantom Pain received "universal acclaim" from critics, according to the review aggregator website Metacritic. Reviewers considered it to be one of the best Metal Gear games. (Note: Attributed to multiple sources:) It has also been cited as one of the greatest stealth games, (Note: Attributed to multiple sources:) and one of the greatest video games of all time. (Note: Attributed to multiple sources:)

Rich Stanton of Eurogamer wrote that "every hand-polished element slots together into a head-spinningly ambitious structure and they combine into something you can only call visionary". IGN's Vince Ingenito felt they had never expected a game to exist "where every minute gameplay detail has true purpose", and Spencer Campbell of EGM described The Phantom Pain as "changing the idea of what can be accomplished with an open world game, both narratively and mechanically". GameSpot's Peter Brown wrote that there had never been a Metal Gear game "so consistent in tone, daring in subject matter, and so captivating in presentation [...] with such depth to its gameplay, or so much volume in content." The Phantom Pain was the twenty-third game—and the third in the Metal Gear series—to receive a perfect 40/40 review rating from Japanese magazine Famitsu.

Critics lauded the gameplay systems and mechanics, controls, and open world design. GameSpot's Brown wrote that playing was an "engrossing and varied experience", calling the gameplay "near-impeccable" and discoverable scenarios "the third pillar" of the world design. Stanton of Eurogamer commended how the open world felt alive through "density and intimacy" over scale, making tasks like crossing a guarded bridge "thrilling". Writing for Time, Matt Peckham described the world as an "unparalleled tactical toybox", a sentiment echoed by other critics; Game Informer's Joe Juba likened each mission to a playground that encouraged players to experiment with tools, and Destructoid's Chris Carter noted the "hundreds" of loadout variations to confront scenarios in "completely different ways". Some praised the artificial intelligence of enemies, and how their tactics changed to combat the player's favored playstyles. David Roberts of GamesRadar+ felt that the game's handling of its systems respected the player's intelligence during mistakes. Conversely, USgamer's Kat Bailey wrote that the game was sometimes too unforgiving in its room for error. The action set pieces were praised as "exhilarating" by PC Gamer's Samuel Roberts, and "terrifying" for their consequences by Eurogamer's Stanton, though some voiced frustration at encounters with the Skulls. Campbell of EGM noted that attacks on the player's Forward Operating Bases could distract from completing concurrent story missions. Time's Peckham found the requirements to unlock the fast travel system excessive.

The narrative divided critics. EGM's Campbell praised it as "one of the strongest yet" in the Metal Gear series, writing some of the game's final moments were exceptionally moving. Polygon's McWhertor described it as "captivating" but often "a bit messy". Brown of GameSpot was similarly captivated by the story and characters, and lauded the tonal consistency and handling of mature themes. Other critics echoed praise of the latter aspect; Eurogamer's Stanton commended how the theme of war was used to explore subject matter, contrasting with other game series "in thrall to the military". Conversely, IGN's Ingenito felt the subject matter was only acknowledged, while plot-related questions were answered in a "rushed and unsatisfying" way. Roberts of GamesRadar+ described the narrative as being uneventful between brief periods of exposition, and criticized the game's handling of its villains. Roberts of PC Gamer called the story "aimless" and the worst in the series, due in part for its "mostly dry" script and the opening and ending sequence for feeling extraneous. Jason Schreier of Kotaku considered the story "damn unfulfilling" and incomplete, criticizing its pacing, dialogue, and characterization. Reviewers disapproved of the requirement that missions were replayed on higher difficulty settings to unlock the final missions; some felt that it added unnecessary padding to the most emotional section of the plot.

PC Gamer's Roberts found the ending twist that the player character is not Big Boss as "one perfect moment in a bad story". He felt that by removing their identity, the epilogue became "a perfect thematic match" for the game by reflecting the player's own gameplay experience. Carter of Destructoid wrote that the series had always "dabbled in the concept of "the legend" being stronger than the actual person". GamesRadar+'s Roberts called a player-created avatar for Big Boss as "purely and distinctly Metal Gear", but felt that the reveal lacked closure and caused the story to feel "hollow" because of the "slapped in" ending and repeated missions. Kotaku's Schreier thought that experiencing a character arc that was not Big Boss' cheapened the rationale for the player's actions, and that the story failed to explain how Venom Snake and Big Boss would become villains.

Many noted changes to typical conventions of the series. (Note: Attributed to multiple sources:) USgamer's Bailey felt it was the right approach that risks were taken to distance The Phantom Pain from the usual Metal Gear formula. Roberts of PC Gamer described the boss fights as being "pretty dull" to previous installments, but appreciated the lack of an "overbearing mythos" in the story; Polygon's Michael McWhertor and Eurogamer's Stanton praised the shorter length of the cutscenes. Conversely, Ingenito of IGN felt they would have preferred excessive cutscenes and emotional moments that they thought Guns of the Patriots had suffered from. Some criticized the choice to include story information in optional audio logs, noting it left certain plot points without necessary context. Others commented on the game's more serious tone compared to its predecessors. Roberts of GamesRadar+ wrote that the "brilliantly horrifying and bizarre-even-by-Metal-Gear-standards" prologue establishes an "equally harrowing plot". PC Gamer's Roberts was disappointed in the tone and reduced humour, and that the story felt non-canonical as a result. The voice acting received particular praise, with Eurogamer's Stanton commending the cast as a "leap" over the game's predecessors. Some expressed bemusement at Venom Snake's minimal dialogue; Kotaku's Schreier and IGN's Ingenito wrote that his silence during emotional cutscenes was "jarring", the latter feeling it went beyond "mere stoicism".

Carter of Destructoid praised the power of the Fox Engine, calling the graphical rendering "beautiful" and the sound design "impeccable". Schreier of Kotaku lauded the game as being "exceptionally polished" and looking "phenomenal", praising Snake's character model and animations. USgamer's Bailey similarly wrote that D-Dog "exhibits almost Pixar-like levels of detail" in his movement and interactions. GameSpot's Brown and IGN's Ingenito described the cinematography as "top-notch" and "beautiful", respectively. Juba of Game Informer felt that the visuals were "great", though noted some occasional texture pop-in. Critics praised the game's performance as "smooth" in spite of its high graphical fidelity.

=== Portrayal of Quiet ===
Before the release of the game, the presentation of the female character Quiet became a topic of controversy concerning her appearance. Halo content producer David Ellis criticized her for being oversexualized and a negative affirmation of the stereotype of the game industry as "full of man babies". Kojima and Konami released Quiet figurines in May 2015 as part of the game's promotion. The figure's soft, pliable breasts were criticized by some in the West in social media and in the press.

The finished game drew more criticism of Quiet's portrayal in both reviews and opinion pieces. Michael McWhertor of Polygon described the justification for Quiet's lack of clothing as "inextricably tied to the game's convoluted story", and criticized how the game similarly presented other female characters by "zeroing in on their jiggling breasts and panning across their asses in a silly, oversexualized way". GamesRadar+'s David Roberts described Quiet as "one of the most complex and conflicted characters in MGS5", but that her depiction was an example of a "juvenile approach to sexuality" that typifies Kojima's work and the Metal Gear series as a whole. IGN's Ingenito called Quiet the most interesting character in the game, writing that her "warm, childlike sincerity and battlefield ferocity cause her to steal every scene she's in." However, he felt disappointed that she was also "required to be a lust-object".

Conversely, GameZone's James Wynne felt that the game's story explanation was a valid enough reason for her scantily-clad appearance and succeeds in Kojima's aim to make Quiet "a true antithesis to sexy-just-because female characters". He also wrote that "Fan service doesn't erase the fact that Quiet is a strong, well-written character that doesn't need a man to save her. That puts her on a level comparable to The Boss, who was the most impressive female character to ever grace a video game."

=== Sales ===
Metal Gear Solid V: The Phantom Pain shipped 3 million physical copies within its first five days of release, across all platforms. On its release date, the game grossed US$179 million, higher than the combined opening day box office of the films Avengers: Age of Ultron and Jurassic World. The Phantom Pain debuted at number one on the United Kingdom charts. It became the third biggest video game launch of 2015 in the UK, behind Batman: Arkham Knight and The Witcher 3: Wild Hunt. The Phantom Pain was the most successful launch for the series in the UK, beating the previous record holder, Metal Gear Solid 2: Sons of Liberty, by 37 percent. The game sold 411,199 physical retail copies on PlayStation 3 and PlayStation 4 within the first week of release in Japan, topping the Japanese software sales charts that week.

In the United Kingdom, the game sold noticeably more on the PlayStation family of consoles than the Xbox. Excluding computer sales, The Phantom Pain moved approximately 72 percent of copies on PlayStation 4, roughly three times the amount sold on the Xbox One, which accounted for 22 percent of sales. three percent of sales were on PlayStation 3, and two percent on Xbox 360. By the end of September 2015, Metal Gear Solid V: The Phantom Pain had shipped over five million copies worldwide, which had raised to over six million by December 2015.

=== Awards ===
Metal Gear Solid V: The Phantom Pain was awarded Game of the Year from several publications, including PC Gamer, GameRevolution, GamesRadar+, and Entertainment Weekly.

Award	Category	Result	Ref.
Golden Joystick Awards 2015	Ultimate Game of the Year	Nominated	
Golden Joystick Awards 2015	Critic's Choice	Won	
The Game Awards 2015	Game of the Year	Nominated	
The Game Awards 2015	Best Action/Adventure	Won	
The Game Awards 2015	Best Art Direction	Nominated	
The Game Awards 2015	Best Score/Soundtrack	Won	
19th Annual D.I.C.E. Awards	Adventure Game of the Year	Won	
12th British Academy Games Awards	Best Game	Nominated	
12th British Academy Games Awards	Artistic Achievement	Nominated	
12th British Academy Games Awards	Audio Achievement	Nominated	
12th British Academy Games Awards	Game Innovation	Nominated	
16th Game Developers Choice Awards	Game of the Year	Nominated	
16th Game Developers Choice Awards	Best Audio	Nominated	
16th Game Developers Choice Awards	Best Design	Nominated	
16th Game Developers Choice Awards	Best Technology	Nominated	
Japan Game Awards 2016	Award for Excellence	Won	
Canadian Videogame Awards 2015	Fans' Choice: Best International Game	Nominated	
