= Ema Kogure =

Japanese voice actress (born 1976)

- Born: October 31, 1976 (age 49); Osaka Prefecture
- Occupation: voice actress

Ema Kogure (小暮 英麻, Kogure Ema; born October 31, 1976) is a freelance Japanese voice actress previously affiliated with Mausu Promotion. She was born in Osaka Prefecture and raised in Adachi, Tokyo.

== Filmography ==
=== Television animation ===
2000s

- Hand Maid May (Mika, Miyuki Zin, Woman)
- Go! Go! Itsutsugo Land (Karin)
- Super GALS! (Girl)
- Star Ocean EX (Cecil)
- Hanaukyo Maid Team (Ringo)
- Aquarian Age: Sign for Evolution (EGO Girl)
- Secret of Cerulean Sand (Jane Buxton)
- Inuyasha (Girl)
- Wolf's Rain (Girl)
- Kimi ga Nozomu Eien (Female Salesperson)
- Chrono Crusade (Nelly, Sister Mary)
- Mermaid Melody: Pichi Pichi Pitch (Caren, Meru)
- R.O.D -The TV- (Newscaster)
- Gilgamesh (Quinque)
- Naruto (Naruto Uzumaki's Sexy Technique)
- Sasami: Magical Girls Club (Ryo-Ohki)
- Night Wizard The Animation (Akari Himuro, Anzelotte)

2010s

- Princess Jellyfish (Emcee)
- Naruto Shippuden (Naruto Uzumaki's Sexy Technique)
- Aokana: Four Rhythm Across the Blue (Arika Okoze)

=== OVA ===
- Fushigi Yūgi Eikoden (Saori Kawai)
- To Heart 2 (Waitress of Mystery)

=== Video games ===
- Aokana: Four Rhythm Across the Blue (Arika Okoze)
- Atelier Annie: Alchemists of Sera Island (Fitz Erberlin)
- Bloody Roar 4 (Mana the Ninetails)
- Boktai series (Lita, Carmilla)
- Crash Bandicoot: The Wrath of Cortex (Coco Bandicoot)
- Crash Nitro Kart (Coco Bandicoot)
- Crash Twinsanity (Coco Bandicoot)
- Di Gi Charat Fantasy (Hinagiku)
- Galaxy Angel series (Almo)
- Shinobido: Way of the Ninja (Princess)
- Lunar Knights (Carmilla)
- Way of the Samurai (Suzu)
- Princess Maker 5 (Michiru Kobayakawa)

=== Drama CDs ===
- Mix Mix Chocolate (Schoolgirl 1)

=== Dubbing roles ===
==== Live-action ====
- ER Season 12, Episode 252 (Sidney)

==== Animation ====
- Codename: Kids Next Door (Numbuh 3)
- Invader Zim (Tak)
- Lilo & Stitch (Elena)
- Little Robots (Rusty)
