= Hungry Days =

Japanese rock band

Hungry Days (often stylized as HUNGRY DAYS)(ハングリー・デイズ) is a rockband from Japan, consisting of 4 members. Their records are produced by the Toshiba-EMI label.

== Summary ==
In 2003, Hungry Days participated in a Teen's Music Festival and were also awarded the Teen's Grand Prix. They made their debut with the single "Ashita ni Mukatte". All members were still at high school.

Furthermore, they received an audition for the movie "Beat Kids".

== Members ==
| Name | Kanji | Instrument | Birth date |
|---|---|---|---|
| Ichimichi Nobuyoshi | 市道信義 | Vocal & Guitar | 14 February 1987 |
| Tanaka Kōhei | 田中康平 | Guitar | 26 December 1986 |
| Furukawa Hiroki | 古河弘基 | Bass | 7 October 1986 |
| Moriguchi Takahiro | 森口貴大 | Drums | 14 August 1986 |

All members were born in Osaka Prefecture.

== Discography ==
=== Single ===
- Ashita (明日) - July 2003
- Ashita2 (明日2) - November 2003

=== Major Hits ===
==== Singles ====
1. Ashita ni Mukatte (明日に向かって) - 12/5/2004. Used in the Japanese version of the Boktai 2 commercial.
2. Kidoairaku (喜怒哀楽)
3. Sotsugyou no Uta (卒業のうた)
4. Rashikuare! (らしくあれ)
5. Orange Spectrum (オレンジ･スペクトラム)
6. Sekai ga Hare tahi ni wa (世界が晴れた日には)

==== Album ====
- We Are Hungry Days! (俺たちがHungry Days!!) - 9/2/2005
- Zero kara no Shoudou (0からの衝動) - 22/2/2006
- Best Days - 28/6/2006
