= Boktai =

Action role-playing video game series

- Genre: Action role-playing
- Developers: Konami; Kojima Productions
- Publisher: Konami
- Creator: Hideo Kojima
- Platforms: Game Boy Advance, Nintendo DS
- First release: Boktai: The Sun Is in Your Hand; July 17, 2003
- Latest release: Lunar Knights; November 22, 2006

Boktai (Note: Known in Japan as Bokura no Taiyō (Japanese: ボクらの太陽, Hepburn: lit. Our Sun).) is a video game series created by Hideo Kojima and published by Konami. The series consists entirely of portable games for the Game Boy Advance and Nintendo DS, and is notable for its unique inclusion of a built-in solar sensor required for gameplay. The final game in the series made use of the solar sensor optional, and excluded one by default. The series revolves around vampire hunters who must use sunlight-based weaponry to combat evil undead creatures. Critics praised the games' unconventional design, although the requirement to play the game outdoors, in order to use the cartridge's light sensor and bring the most color out of the screen of the Game Boy Advance, ensured that it had only a niche audience, with the third game in the series not receiving a release outside of Japan. The series crossed over multiple times with Capcom's Mega Man Battle Network series.

== Games ==
Release timeline
2003	Boktai: The Sun Is in Your Hand
2004	Boktai 2: Solar Boy Django
2005	Boktai 3: Sabata's Counterattack
2006	Lunar Knights

=== Boktai 3: Sabata's Counterattack ===
Boktai 3: Sabata's Counterattack (Note: Known in Japan as Shin Bokura no Taiyō: Gyakushū no Sabata.) was released on July 28, 2005, in Japan with a retail price of ¥4980. In it, Django is able to use both a gun and sword, and action elements were increased, with a corresponding decrease in the amount of puzzles. The game has motorcycle-riding sections in which the player avoids obstacles and defeats enemies. Motorcycles can be customized and raced against other players via Game Link Cable.

The game was never officially released in the West, but received a complete dialog fan translation in 2007, enabling it to be completed in English.

=== Lunar Knights ===
Lunar Knights was first released on November 22, 2006. It retained the Bokura no Taiyō series name in Japan, and takes place in the same universe, but was not localized under the name Boktai 4. This was stated by one of the game's producers to be due to its more drastic changes from previous entries and the fact that it was a soft reboot. Craig Harris of IGN also theorized that there was a "stigma" around previous games' use of the solar sensor that Konami wanted to avoid by making it seem like a new IP, saying that "unless you're a sharp cookie or a die-hard Boktai fanatic, you'd never be clued in" to the fact that it was an entry in the Boktai series.

Lunar Knights revolves around dual protagonists, Aaron, a hero equipped with a solar gun, and Lucian, a sword-wielding "vampire killer" who gains power from darkness, as they seek to free the planet from the hold of tyrannical vampires who have covered the world in a false sky. The player must swap between them depending on the time of day in the real world, which affects the weapons and techniques the player can use. The game removes most puzzle elements that were in previous games, focusing more heavily on action, but still incorporates Metal Gear-inspired stealth gameplay that can be used to sneak past enemies.

== Reception ==
Jeremy Parish of USgamer called Boktai similar to a mash-up of Metal Gear and Castlevania, although remarking that there was more to it than this, as the games also drew heavily on spaghetti westerns. He called the requirement to charge the player's gun using actual sunlight "baroque and complex", and an "extreme solution", but "perfectly fitting coming from Hideo Kojima, a man known for his love of manipulating audiences and breaking the fourth wall". Citing how he found memorable real-life places to play Boktai, he stated that "the lengths to which I went to complete Boktai made it one of the most memorable gaming experiences I've ever enjoyed".

Lean-Karlo Lemus of Ars Technica called the Boktai series "ultimately a victim of Konami's fickle nature", citing their decision not to release Boktai 3 outside of Japan. He also stated his wish for other games to use similar techniques, saying that while "the Switch Joy-Con and its powerful built-in infrared sensor puts Boktai's UV sensor to shame [...] outside of Nintendo Labo, precious few titles have used it in any meaningful capacity".
