= Hand Maid May =

Japanese anime television series

- DVD box set cover art

HAND MAID メイ
- Genre: Harem, romantic comedy, science fiction
- Created by: Jūzō Mutsuki, Wonderfarm
- Anime television series
- Directed by: Shinichiro Kimura; Tetsuya Yanagisawa (series director)
- Produced by: Akio Matsuda
- Written by: Kazuki Matsui
- Music by: Toshio Masuda
- Studio: TNK (series); Tokyo Kids (OVA)
- Licensed by: NA: Discotek Media
- Original network: Wowow
- Original run: July 6, 2000 – September 22, 2000
- Episodes: 10 + OVA

Hand Maid May (Japanese: HAND MAID メイ, Hepburn: Hando Meido Mei) is a Japanese anime television series created by Jūzō Mutsuki and Wonderfarm and produced by NBCUniversal Entertainment Japan, Pioneer Entertainment (USA) LP., and TNK. It is directed by Shinichiro Kimura and Tetsuya Yanagisawa, with Kazuki Matsui handling series composition, Katsuzō Hirata designing the characters and Toshio Masuda composing the music. The anime first aired on Wowow between July 6 and September 22, 2000, running for 10 episodes. An OVA was bundled with a DVD box set released on February 21, 2001. The series centers on the adventures of the main character, Kazuya Saotome, and a robotic Cyberdoll named May. Formerly available from Geneon in the United States, Discotek Media will release the series on Blu-ray Disc in 2024.

== Story ==
Kazuya Saotome is a nerdy second-year engineering student at Ochanomizu Industrial University (お茶の水工業大学, Ochanomizu Kōgyō Daigaku). His lifelong dream is to build a Doraemon (robot); he is trying to develop an artificial intelligence (AI) robot that happens to look like a toy squid. The story begins when Kazuya's wealthy rival, Kotaro Nanbara, gives him a computer program that supposedly will provide valuable information to help with Kazuya's research and development. However, the program is a virus that Nanbara created in order to infect Kazuya's computer and destroy his work.

While attempting to fix his infected computer, Kazuya accidentally orders a "cyberdoll" from the Cyberdyne Corporation website. As a result, he receives in the mail the titular Hand Maid May. May is a palm-sized robotic doll who is very sensitive and sympathetic to Kazuya's feelings, likes, and needs. The early part of the storyline focuses on Nanbara trying to get May taken away from Kazuya due to his inability to pay for her. Nanbara enlists the help of several other cyberdolls to attempt to take May away from Kazuya, but all of them end up falling for Kazuya and failing to retrieve May.

In the latter part of the anime, May is upgraded to a lifesize version of herself after Kazuya receives a visit from a mysterious visitor who wishes to promote Kazuya's artificial intelligence research. The situation complicates further when Kazuya's human friend Kasumi begins to get jealous of the Cyberdolls flirting with Kazuya; they all compete to see who can go on a date with him. The last segment of the story deals with Kazuya and May having to deal with a virus which is shutting down all of the cyberdolls, and a couple of mysterious visitors who turn out to be related to Kazuya and Nanbara in the future.

== Characters ==
=== Main characters ===
Kazuya Saotome (早乙女 和也, Saotome Kazuya)
Voiced by: Takayuki Yamaguchi (Japanese); Steve Canden (English)
Kazuya is a 19-year-old electrical engineering student with a passion for building robots, primarily a robot squid which he calls Ikariya and implementing an AI system into it. He is a bit absent-minded and is clueless when it comes to girls. He has two sisters as shown in the 7th episode. However it is later revealed that in the future, his work with Ikariya will eventually become the basis for the M.a.i.d. Program (short for Meet Ai Departure, Ai means Love in Japanese). Kazuya lives in apartment 204 of Kasumi House. His life becomes more complicated but yet more satisfying after the arrival of cyberdoll May and the subsequent cyberdolls.
Kasumi Tani (谷 かすみ, Tani Kasumi)
Voiced by: Mikako Takahashi (Japanese); Michelle Ruff (English)
Kasumi is the 18-year-old daughter of the owners of Kasumi House, a small wooden apartment building. Her window faces Kazuya's window, so she uses a long ladder that runs from his balcony to hers as a bridge to pay him a visit, along with Rena. Because she's a close friend of Kazuya's, she often lets him get away with overdue rent payments. In addition to being a college student, Kasumi is very active, athletic, and likes baseball. She is a coach for the local little league baseball team, and her uniform number is 33. She is shown to have a tomboyish side, as she refers to herself as "boku" (the Japanese male form of "I"), but she has a kind side. She has feelings for Kazuya and will wear more revealing outfits when coming to visit him. She sees the cyberdolls, primarily May, as a friendly rival for his affections.
Kotaro Nanbara (南原 耕太郎, Nanbara Kōtarō)
Voiced by: Yūji Ueda (Japanese); Bob Marx (English)
The self-proclaimed "best friend and worst enemy" of Kazuya Saotome. Nanbara is very rich with an eccentric, egomaniacal personality. He is jealous of being outdone in projects by the Kazuya. His virus caused Kazuya to inadvertently order May. Nanbara gets Sara to do his chores by offering ramen in exchange. Though very antagonistic against May in her smaller form in earlier episodes, he falls in love when she is enlarged to human size. It is later revealed that he and Kazuya will form the Cyberdyne Corporation that produces the Cyberdolls and will be run by their descendants.

=== Cyberdolls ===
Cyberdoll May (サイバドール・メイ, Saibadōru Mei; G-99(D)-JPS)
Voiced by: Maria Yamamoto (Japanese); Lia Sargent (English)
A hand-sized 1/6 scale cyberdoll from the Cyberdyne Corporation (not to be confused with The Terminator's robotic company, Cyberdyne Systems). Kazuya receives May because of an accidental order which happened as a result of a revenge tactic planted in a DVD-RAM from his rival, Nanbara. She has to be plugged into Kazuya's computer via a homemade cable in order to recharge her batteries because May's official recharging equipment was accidentally broken when Kazuya first received her. May was never paid for by Kazuya, and thus became a target for Sara and Cyberdyne in early episodes.
As a cyberdoll, she can control traffic lights and simple electronics, and can connect to personal computers via what may or may not be USB cables. She later becomes a human-sized 17-year-old version (courtesy of Cyber-X) following her repossession. Her personality is innocent, and at times childish and naive, though she also shows surprising insight and is always able to cheer Kazuya up. Unlike the other cyberdolls, May's Maid Program had evolved (according to Kei during her analysis), making her more human and resistant to the retro-cybervirus that threatened the other cyberdolls. She shows strong feelings towards Kazuya and is often competing with Kasumi. In the last episode it has also been stated that she can give birth.
Cyberdoll Sara (サイバドール・サラ, Saibadōru Sara; Af-77LC-CHN)
Voiced by: Kyōko Hikami (Japanese); Wendee Lee (English)
Sara is a 23-year-old Cyberdoll from Cyberdyne's Customer Service division, she has tan skin, silver hair, pointed ears and wears a Chinese qipao. She is addicted to ramen and seems to have an endless stomach for it. Her goal early on is to repossess Cyberdoll May because Kazuya did not pay for her. She later develops a crush on Kazuya.

Cyberdoll Rena (サイバドール・レナ, Saibadōru Rena; Cf-3357L-JPA)
Voiced by: Rie Kugimiya (Japanese); Reba West (English)
Another Cyberdoll in the form of a 9-year-old child sent by Cyberdyne to recover May. She was first discovered by Kazuya and May as a lost child. Rena decides that she likes Kazuya and Ikariya, and therefore does not return May to Cyberdyne; instead she moves in with Kasumi. In the Japanese audio, she is referred to by everyone, including herself, as "Rena-chan." She has the ability to produce supersonic screams.
Cyberdoll Kei (サイバドール・ケイ, Saibadōru Kei; Af-444LC-JPN)
Voiced by: Omi Minami (Japanese); Jane Arden (English)
Kei is a 21-year-old genius Cyberdoll said to have an IQ of 50,000 in human terms. Kei is given the mission of formulating a strategy to get May back, but becomes interested in Kazuya after hearing how he regards Cyberdolls and changes her mind. Kei's memory bank of facts is extensive, but she often takes a while to process information that is more abstract. At times, abstract or philosophical questions can cause her CPU to lock up. She later develops a crush on Kazuya and takes up residence in his closet.
Cyberdoll Mami (サイバドール・マミ, Saibadōru Mami; Af-863LD-USNY)
Voiced by: Kikuko Inoue (Japanese); Dorothy Melendrez (English)
Mami, age 31, is from Cyberdyne's American branch and is a combination of both Japanese and American cultures (she wears both a kimono and roller blades. She has the habit of saying "Oh, my, my" (あらあら〜♪, Ara-ara) when amazed or otherwise. She arrives later to help Kazuya around the house, and is gifted at domestic tasks which causes May to be jealous. Even so, Mami tries to pair Kazuya and May up. She is later revealed to be the caretaker of Kazuya's descendant Takuya Saotome.

=== Cyberdyne Corporation ===
Takuya Saotome (早乙女 卓也, Saotome Takuya) / Cyber-X (サイバーX, Saibā Ekkusu)
Voiced by: Shinichiro Miki (Japanese); Sam Strong (English)
He is Kazuya's descendant. In his initial appearances he wears a red trenchcoat, white pants, and a yellow hat, and wears a type of muscle suit that covers his torso and arms with specifications (which is to hide his obese body). He also wears a specially-designed helmet that has an opening mouthpiece to eat or drink (especially milk which is his favorite). He first appears in the second episode watching over May, and in the same episode guides Kazuya (without his knowledge) to May who was lost in the city. He fully introduces himself in the 5th episode after May is repossessed. He shows interest in Kazuya's research with Artificial Intelligence, and allows Kazuya to choose a Cyberdoll for research. To Kazuya's request he arranges May to be returned to him and in a full-sized body as a bonus. His main ability lies in his incredibly fast typing skills, which even with only one hand was able to keep up with Kotaro's long and fast password. He is not fully unmasked until after the credits in the 10th episode, where he shown with green hair and wearing glasses with orange lens and red trim.
Totaro Nanbara (南原 騰太郎, Nabara Tōtarō) / Commando Z (コマンドZ, Komando Zetto)
Voiced by: Nobutoshi Canna (Japanese); John Holmes (English)
The so-called "Wandering President of Cyberdyne", Totaro is every bit as egomaniacal as his ancestor Kotaro, although he has a stronger streak of common sense. He normally wears a kind of scarlet bodysuit and cape (A reference to Kaiketsu Zubat), and makes a big production during his introductions (His introduction dialogue is very similar to Kaiketsu Zubat's). Apparently, he and Kazuya's descendant has formed a partnership in running Cyberdyne, with Takuya in research and development and Totaro handling the financial ends. He comes to Kotaro to warn him and Kazuya about the virus.

=== The Whirlwind of Love cast ===
Gin Munakata (宗方 吟, Murakata Gin) / Kintaro Yamazaki (山崎 金太郎, Yamazaki Kintarō)
Voiced by: Nobutoshi Canna (Japanese); Lex Lang (English)
Naomi Ryuzaki (竜崎 ナオミ, Ryūzaki Naomi) / Mika Rokujoin (六條院 美香, Rokujōin Mika)
Voiced by: Ema Kogure (Japanese); Sara West (English)
Tosshinta Yamada (山田 突進太, Yamada Tosshinta) / Versailles Juliano (ヴェルサイユ・ジュリアーノ, Verusaiyu Juriāno)
Voiced by: Kisho Taniyama

=== Other characters ===
Ikariya (イカリヤ)
Voiced by: Miwa Yasuda (Japanese); Ian Hawk (English)
A robotic squid and Kazuya's Doraemon Research Project. It is primitive compared to the Cyberdolls. Rena has a fondness for Ikariya, taking it wherever she goes.
Shikishima (敷島)
Kazuya's next door neighbor who resides in room 203. He sometimes make huge crushing sounds, causing Kasumi to run back to chase him for the rent. He also helps to provide ice blocks for Kasumi to lower the temperature of the Cyberdolls in Episode 10. He shows up again with no appearance but with crushing sounds in the last episode. It also seems only Kasumi, Rena and May saw his appearance.
Hiroshi Daimon (大門 大, Daimon Hiroshi)
Voiced by: Katsuyuki Konishi (Japanese); Phil Brewster (English)
Den Tadokoro (田所 田, Tadokoro Den)
Voiced by: Toshiaki Kuwahara (Japanese); Robert Machemer (English)
Hikari Komyoji (光明寺 ひかり, Komyoji Hikari)
Voiced by: Shōko Kikuchi (Japanese); PJ Lee (English)
Chigusa Tani (谷 千草, Tani Chigusa)
Voiced by: Kae Araki (Japanese); Lynn Fischer (English)
Kasumi's mother.
Masato Jin (神 真人, Jin Masato)
Voiced by: Miwa Yasuda (Japanese); Mona Marshall (English)
Miyuki Jin (神 美雪, Jin Miyuki)
Voiced by: Ema Kogure (Japanese); Sandy Fox (English)
Aoi Saotome (早乙女 あおい, Saotome Aoi)
Voiced by: Asako Dodo
Midori Saotome (早乙女 みどり, Saotome Midori)
Voiced by: Jun Mizuki
Kisaragi (如月)
Voiced by: Toshiaki Kuwahara
A lolicon and cosplay fanatic who lives in room 201 of Kasumi House.

== Episode list ==
No.	Title	Directed by	Written by	Original air date
1	"How Do You Do?"; Transliteration: "Hajimemashite!" (Japanese: はじめまして!)	Shinichiro Kimura	Kazuki Matsui	July 26, 2000
After Kazuya Saotome's computer is infected with a virus, by his self-proclaimed rival Kotaro Nanbara, a package is delivered to his doorstep the next day. The package contains a 12" tall Cyberdoll named May.
2	"Am I Useful At All?"; Transliteration: "Oyaku ni tatteru no kana?" (Japanese: お役に立ってるのかな?)	Yukina Hiiro	Kōichi Taki	August 2, 2000
After telling May to stay in the apartment, Kazuya goes off to school. Later, Nanbara calls Kazuya's apartment only to hear a woman's voice on the other end, and soon tries to sabotage the relationship he believes Kazuya is having with a secret woman. Also, another Cyberdoll named Sara has come to collect the bill for May. [1,450,000 Yen]
3	"What Should I Do..."; Transliteration: "Dōshimashō..." (Japanese: どうしましょう…)	Takeshi Yamaguchi	Kenichi Yamada	August 9, 2000
Sara, after having trouble collecting the payment for May, sends for another Cyberdoll (Rena) to get the payment, or get May back.
4	"Please Don't Look!"; Transliteration: "Minaide kudasai!" (Japanese: 見ないでください!)	Shigeru Kimiya	Mutsumi Nakano	August 16, 2000
Cyberdoll Kei, a genius Cyberdoll sent by Sara, pretends to be a fellow AI researcher in order to meet with Kazuya. After they meet, she is amazed by the emotions Cyberdoll May displays towards him.
5	"Until Today, I've Really..."; Transliteration: "Kyō made... hontō ni..." (Japanese: 今日まで…本当に…)	Megumi Yamamoto	Kōichi Taki	August 23, 2000
Kazuya realizes that he can never afford to pay for May, so he must give her back. So, on their last day together Kazuya and May spend the day at an amusement park so that they can enjoy the time they have left together. After May is gone, "Cyber X", an apparent android shows up at Kazuya's apartment and makes him an offer...
6	"More! More!"; Transliteration: "Motto motto!" (Japanese: もっともっと!)	Jirō Fujimoto	Kazuki Matsui	August 30, 2000
After May returns, Kei starts work as a lab assistant at the university. Later, everyone goes to the annual fireworks festival, where Nanbara meets the now full-sized May and falls in love with her.
7	"I Don't Have Much Time?"; Transliteration: "Jikan ga nai, desu ka?" (Japanese: 時間がない、ですか?)	Masahiko Itojima	Kenichi Yamada	September 6, 2000
Cyberdoll Mami arrives, and soon arranges a "marriage mixer." Later, Mami again tries to make a match by having Kazuya and May go shopping together, alone. But Mami's visit is not just for leisure, she soon reveals that May and Kazuya's time together may be cut short again.
8	"There's So Much I Want!"; Transliteration: "Takusan hoshii n desu!" (Japanese: たくさん欲しいんです!)	Shinichiro Kimura	Kōichi Taki	September 13, 2000
Everyone works to protect the ladder between Kazuya's apartment and Kasumi's room from a typhoon. We also discover more of Kasumi and Kazuya, and their relationship...
9	"Still... I Believe You"; Transliteration: "Soredemo... shinjitemasu" (Japanese: それでも…信じてます)	Shigeru Ueda	Mutsumi Nakano	September 20, 2000
Commando Z, the "wandering president of Cyberdyne," appears, and has come to discover why a potentially fatal "virus" is afflicting all of the Cyberdolls, except for May...
10	"Doing May Best"; Transliteration: "Meippai" (Japanese: メイっぱい)	Shinichiro Kimura	Kazuki Matsui	September 21, 2000
It is discovered that the deadly Cyberdoll virus was created within May when she was converted from 1/6 scale to full size. "Commando Z" reveals himself to be a time-traveler from the future to discover the virus' origins and stop it before it destroys all the Cyberdolls. Since May is immune to the virus, she volunteers herself to be infected with it to allow further study on the virus and a possible cure. But everyone is worried that May may not make it out alive.
11 (OVA)	"Never Give Up"; Transliteration: "Akiramemasen" (Japanese: あきらめません)	Shinichiro Kimura	Shinichiro Kimura	February 21, 2001
At Kazuya's apartment, a package from Cyberdoll Mami filled with five "Chibi-Cyberdoll Mays" arrives. Later, an accident causes May's personality to go into the five mini-May's, each one receiving a distinct aspect of her personality. Elsewhere, Rena finds a lost child and brings it home. [This episode was included with the DVD set, and never aired]

== Theme songs ==
Opening Theme - "Jump ~ MAYppai Dakishimete" (JUMP〜メイっぱい抱きしめて)
Arrangement - Hiroo Oyagi, Kaoru Okubo
Composition, Lyrics - Hiroo Oyagi
Artist - P-Chicks

Ending Theme - "Honto no Kimochi" (ほんとの気持ち; "True Feelings")
Composition, Arrangement - Toshio Matsuda
Lyrics - Yuko Matsuzaki
Artist - Mikako Takahashi

== Spinoff series ==
Wonderfarm worked on a spinoff OVA series titled Hand Maid Mai, which focuses on a completely different cast of characters. The first episode was released on January 18, 2003, but the series was cancelled due to the bankruptcy of distributor Five Ways.
