= Blue Gender =

1999 science fiction anime television series

- Blue Gender DVD box set released by Funimation
- Genre: Mecha; Science fiction horror
- Created by: Ryōsuke Takahashi
- Anime television series
- Directed by: Masashi Abe
- Produced by: Yasuo Hasegawa; Hiroaki Inoue; Hiroshi Tazaki; Bag Min Beob
- Written by: Katsumi Hasegawa
- Music by: Kuniaki Haishima
- Studio: AIC
- Licensed by: NA: Crunchyroll; UK: MVM Films
- Original network: TBS
- English network: BI: Sci Fi Channel; US: Adult Swim, Funimation Channel
- Original run: October 10, 1999 – March 31, 2000
- Episodes: 26
- Manga
- Written by: Ryōsuke Takahashi
- Illustrated by: Takashi Hashimoto
- Published by: Kadokawa Shoten
- Magazine: Comic Dragon
- Published: December 2000
- Volumes: 1
- Anime film

Blue Gender: The Warrior
- Directed by: Koichi Ohata
- Written by: Daisuke Okamoto
- Music by: Kuniaki Haishima
- Studio: AIC
- Licensed by: NA: Crunchyroll
- Released: November 20, 2002
- Runtime: 95 minutes

Blue Gender is a 1999 Japanese animated science fiction television series produced by AIC and creator Ryōsuke Takahashi. The series is set in the 2030s, where Earth has been overrun by alien insectoid creatures called the Blue, which have wiped out most of the human race and forced the surviving humans to flee to Second Earth, a huge space station that orbits the planet. It focuses on the relationship between Yuji Kaido – a Japanese civilian rescued from cryogenic sleep, and Marlene Angel – a soldier from Second Earth, as they participate in military operations against the Blue.

The series was broadcast on TBS from 1999 to 2000 and spans 26 episodes. The series was followed by Blue Gender: The Warrior, a compilation movie with an alternative ending, in 2002. Blue Gender was also broadcast in the United Kingdom from 2002 to 2003 on the Sci Fi Channel. In 2003, Blue Gender was released on American television as part of Cartoon Network's Adult Swim block, though it had originally been planned for a Toonami broadcast, and was thus edited to remove more of its graphic violence, nudity, and sex scenes than usual, even for Adult Swim's standards. However, it aired uncut on the Funimation Channel in the United States.

== Plot ==
In 2009, Yuji Kaido is diagnosed with a severe illness and is put into cryogenic sleep until a cure is found. In 2031, he is awakened amid a raging war between armored soldiers and insectoid beings called the "Blue", which kill and harvest humans for food. The Blue have overrun the Earth and wiped out most of the human race.

The soldiers are from an orbiting space colony collectively called Second Earth and have been ordered to recover "sleepers" such as Yuji around the Earth. They are led by Marlene Angel, who at first appears to be heartless toward others. On the journey to Second Earth, Yuji meets many of the humans who were left behind during the evacuation due to limited resources. Standing orders for Marlene and her platoon are to consider any human survivors on the surface to be already dead, which greatly troubles Yuji.

On their journey, all of the soldiers are killed except for Marlene, causing Yuji to fall into deep depression as he recognizes the destruction around him and his inability to save those he cares about, especially after failing to save human survivors from a swarm of Blue in Seoul. During their travel to the Baikonur Cosmodrome through the mountains of Central Asia, Yuji and Marlene develop a bond that softens her sharp edges and they become romantically involved with one another. Upon reaching Baikonur, Yuji and Marlene encounter another group of soldiers and after fighting off more Blue, they escape on the shuttle. During the flight to Second Earth, a mutated Blue hidden in the shuttle attacks Yuji, critically injuring him.

Yuji and Marlene are separated upon arriving at Second Earth, and the High Council demotes Marlene and sends her back into training at the education station as punishment for failing to protect Yuji. Not knowing what happened after he was attacked, Marlene rebels and is determined to find Yuji. When she does, she finds he has healed and is being trained to use a new specialized sleeper-specific mech called the Double Edge, which is much stronger than the originals used in the war against the Blue. It is revealed that Yuji's illness is the key to destroying the Blue and taking back the planet. Yuji and the other Sleepers have B-cells, which are also the genetic makeup of the Blue.

The High Council reluctantly agrees to reinstate Marlene and allow her to work with Yuji again. After intensive training, they return to Earth with two other Sleepers – Tony Frost and Alicia Whistle. They and the other forces of Second Earth battle the Blue, successfully destroying the most enormous nests across Africa. However, the battles begin to harm Yuji, who has minimal regard for human life and is utterly obsessed with surpassing Tony in killing the Blue. Yuji's actions deeply concern Marlene, and she begins to realize something is wrong.

Shortly after returning to Second Earth, the High Council orders the Sleepers on a second offensive against the Blue in New York City. As the Sleepers are carrying out their mission, a battle on Second Earth between two factions is waged. Seno Miyagi, the director of Second Earth's science division, leads the Ark rebellion and seizes control of the military, lunar resources, and education stations of Second Earth from the High Council, who escape to and retain control of the medical station. Seno reveals to Marlene the nature of the illness that put Yuji in stasis, the source of his abilities, and the source of the Blue: they are a defense mechanism enacted by the Earth to purge the existence of humanity, and the B-cells that exist in the Sleepers could become a potential threat to humanity as well.

After the Ark successfully takes over Second Earth from the High Council, Marlene heads down to New York in search of Yuji. When she finds him, his B-cells are beginning to activate, and goes berserk as a killing machine. After struggling with him, Marlene is finally able to get through to Yuji and helps him overcome his madness by showing him her human emotions and feelings. Meanwhile, Tony and Alicia abandon the remaining ground forces as their B-cells have fully awakened. They return to Second Earth with several Blue when they board the medical station, killing most of Second Earth's high command.

Tony and Alicia plan to ram the medical station into the military station to destroy Second Earth. They see this as the "Grand Will of the Earth", in which they will become "messiahs" and cleanse Earth of humanity forever. Yuji, Marlene, and a group of other soldiers infiltrate the station and subdue Alicia. Yuji then confronts and shoots Tony. Alicia ventures back to Tony to die with him as the military destroys the medical station.

Seno's junta decides to abandon Earth, and Yuji becomes depressed and contemplates his existence, wondering what he has been fighting for, why he was awakened, why he cannot save his friends, and what Earth's true will is. However, Marlene manages to reconnect with Yuji again; they agree to convince Seno to let them go back to Earth and fight the Blue, and finally become lovers.

After discovering a new migration pattern of the Blue, Seno agrees to let Yuji and Marlene lead a group of volunteers to an area in South America where a massive nest is located. The nest seems impenetrable at first, but they eventually find an entrance with the help of the local people. The entrance leads to a tunnel where the walls, ceiling, and floor of the cavern are composed of fossil-like Blue. The team finally comes upon a crystal formation in a massive cavern. A huge Blue is born from the gel substance sitting atop the formation and kills everyone except for Yuji and Marlene. Yuji kills it and concludes that the sphere will hold the answers he seeks. He sends Marlene, who is pregnant with their child, to the surface to regroup with the remaining volunteers and wait for him. He then gets a vision and can see what the Earth itself can see. Yuji comes to understand how mankind can live alongside the B-cells and returns to Marlene.

Meanwhile, Second Earth's citizens revolt against Seno and kill him, and then begin abandoning the station for Earth via shuttles. A firefight erupts over the last remaining overcrowded shuttle, and a massive explosion destroys the station. All around the world, from former Blue Nests, long strings of coalescing energy ascend into Earth's atmosphere and form a ring. Yuji and Marlene watch this, realizing Earth is now safe again, and look forward to the rest of their lives together as the sun sets.

== Main characters ==
- Yuji Kaido (海堂 祐司, Kaidō Yūji) – After being diagnosed with an incurable disease (later discovered to be B-cells), Yuji Kaido decides to be put in cryogenic sleep in hopes that an effective treatment will be developed soon. In 2031, twenty-two years later, Yuji wakes up to find the world overrun by a deadly alien species known as the 'Blue'. In 2009 Yuji worked in a gas station, rode his motorcycle, and hung out with his friend Takashi. But in 2031 everything Yuji knew has been destroyed by the Blue. He feels lost and alone in an unforgiving new world. For better or for worse, Yuji is guided by the only thing that he can't trust – his emotions – as he attempts to gain control over his new life. Voiced by: Kenji Nojima (Japanese); Eric Vale (English)
- Marlene Angel (マリーン・エンジェル, Marīn Enjeru) – Orphaned at the age of ten because her parents were killed by the Blue, Marlene was one of the few lucky ones to make it to Second Earth. Since then, Marlene has dedicated and trained herself to defeat the Blue. Though seeming very heartless and cold in the earlier episodes, as time progresses, Yuji opens up Marlene's emotions and a bond is created. As Marlene's emotions begin to resurface, everything she was taught to believe in begins to break down. Towards the end of the series, she and Yuji conceive a child together. Voiced by: Houko Kuwashima (Japanese); Laura Bailey (English)
- Tony Frost (トニー・フロスト, Tonī Furosuto) – Another Sleeper who unlike Yuji, awoke on Second Earth. A very powerful Sleeper, He is easily the most advanced member of the Sleeper Brigade and trusts no one. Yuji strives to improve himself to be able to beat Tony. Tony seems to have no emotion except for the euphoria of destroying Blue. It becomes apparent in later episodes, however, that he sees himself as a Messiah when his B-cells initiate, and teams up with Alicia to carry out "Final Judgment" to cleanse Earth of humanity forever. Voiced by: Hiroyuki Satō (Japanese); Jerry Jewell (English)
- Alicia Whistle (アリシア・ウィッスル, Arisha Wissuru) – Another Sleeper on Second Earth who is paired with Tony. She immediately gravitates towards Yuji, seeing Marlene as an obstacle to a relationship with him. She is very young and often naïve. However, like Tony, in later episodes she sees himself as a Messiah when her B-cells initiate, and she and Tony decide to carry out "Final Judgment" to cleanse Earth of humanity forever. Voiced by: Miwa Yasuda (Japanese); Lisa Ortiz (English)
- Seno Miyagi (セノ・ミヤギ, Seno Miyagi) – A high-ranking member of the science division on Second Earth. He suggests that Yuji and Marlene be kept together in order to get the best results from Yuji in the Sleeper program. Not agreeing with the High Council's leadership of Second Earth or its reckless use of the sleepers, he eventually forms a group called The Ark, which would later overthrow the High Council's "government" on Second Earth. Seno would subsequently become the leader of Second Earth, but only for a brief time. His order to abandon Earth eventually results in a revolt and his execution by citizens who wanted to return to Earth. Voiced by: Katsunosuke Hori (Japanese); Kyle Hebert (English)
- Rick – Rick is a military Elite, and although he fights on the Sleeper Brigade, he is not a Sleeper. He is cocky, confident, and loves strong women, especially Marlene. Voiced by: Eiji Ito (Japanese); Sean Schemmel (English)
- Doug Vreiss – Doug is the assistant to the High Council and a high-ranking official on Second Earth. He is the Director of the Military Station, and also participates in High Council inquiries. He is later shot and killed by Miyagi. Voiced by: Shunsuke Shima (Japanese); Bradford Jackson (English)

== Episodes ==
No.	Title	Original release date	English air date
1	"One Day"	October 10, 1999	August 4, 2003
It is the year 2031. Humankind has been replaced as the dominant species on Earth by a race of monstrous insectoid creatures known as the Blue. Sleeper Yuji Kaido finds himself thrust into this nightmarish world, suddenly awakened after 22 years in suspended animation. Alone and surrounded by Blue, Yuji's only hope for survival comes from the elite Sleeper Recovery Team, and a steely Mech pilot named Marlene...
2	"Cry"	October 15, 1999	August 5, 2003
Yuji learns the horrible truth about the Blue. Their infestation of the planet has forced the human race to seek refuge in outer space. Marlene and the Sleeper Recovery Team have been given orders to get Yuji to the space station Second Earth alive. But with the Blue lurking around at every turn, things do not always go according to plan.
3	"Trial"	October 22, 1999	August 6, 2003
Tired of feeling helpless in this new hostile world, Yuji pleads to be trained as part of the team. Marlene gives Yuji a crash course on weapons. Joey teaches him the basics of driving a mech suit. Armed with his new skills and his newfound confidence in his ability to survive, Yuji is ready for action. But against an enemy like the Blue, overconfidence can be deadly...
4	"Agony"	October 29, 1999	August 7, 2003
Yuji disobeys Marlene's orders by saving a little girl's life and discovers a group of survivors hidden among the ruins of Seoul. Yuji makes a promise to the little girl, Yung, that he will protect her from the Blue. But this new cause is threatened when he learns a shocking truth about his rescuers from Second Earth.
5	"Priority"	November 5, 1999	August 11, 2003
The surviving members of the Sleeper Recovery Team must enter an abandoned communications tower in the ruins of downtown Seoul that is now a Blue nest in a desperate attempt to contact Second Earth. With the Blue now converging on their position, the only chance of staying alive is to draw the Blue into a fight using human survivors as bait. Yuji has promised to protect Yung at any cost—but is it a promise he can keep?
6	"Relation"	November 12, 1999	August 12, 2003
Yuji and Marlene now travel on foot towards the Baikonur Cosmodrome in Kazakhstan. The tensions between the two come to a head, as Yuji confronts the demons that now haunt him in this nightmarish new world. As she witnesses Yuji's struggle, Marlene's own horrifying memories of the past begin to resurface. But can even Yuji's fiery emotions help to melt away Marlene's icy exterior?
7	"Sympathy"	November 19, 1999	August 13, 2003
Still en route to Baikonur, Yuji and Marlene cross paths with a rough-mannered stranger named Dice in the Gobi Desert. With the Blue lurking dangerously close, he offers them shelter for the night and Yuji is given a glimpse into his seemingly carefree life. But as Yuji soon discovers, no one left on Earth is without their demons... not even Dice.
8	"Oasis"	November 26, 1999	August 14, 2003
Yuji is separated from Marlene and Dice amidst the confusion of a sandstorm. He is rescued from the desert by a band of nomads and is befriended by Elena, a young nomad girl. As Yuji begins to believe that a peaceful life might still be possible, a raid by a group of bandits serves him a harsh reminder that there is more than one kind of danger in the world—and it is never far away.
9	"Confirm"	December 3, 1999	August 18, 2003
Marlene and Dice are reunited with Yuji outside the nomad camp. Marlene pressures Yuji to continue his journey to Second Earth, but Yuji refuses. He decides to remain with Elena and her people and to live out the rest of his life in peace. But when Marlene and Dice are attacked by the Blue, Yuji is forced to choose between his life with Elena and saving the lives of his friends.
10	"Tactics"	December 10, 1999	August 19, 2003
Yuji and Marlene arrive at Baikonur, only to find the space base in a state of chaos. The facility is crawling with Blue, and the computer defense systems have turned on their human counterparts. Now, with supplies and personnel dwindling, the assembled recovery teams must launch a desperate bid to regain control of the base.
11	"Go Mad"	December 17, 1999	August 20, 2003
The lives of the remaining recovery squad members are thrown into jeopardy when a renegade officer attempts to hijack the shuttle and escape on his own. The attempt is thwarted, but the cost is the diversion of valuable resources from the battlefield, where Marlene and a small team of Armor Shrike pilots are fighting to stay alive!
12	"Progress"	December 24, 1999	August 21, 2003
Yuji is rushed into intensive care after being attacked by a Blue aboard the shuttle to Second Earth. Now, Marlene must face an inquiry before the High Council and defend her recent actions on the planet's surface. But Marlene has questions of her own, and soon begins to suspect a dark design behind the Council's plans for the recovered Sleeper, Yuji.
13	"Heresy"	January 14, 2000	August 25, 2003
When Yuji disappears from the Medical Station, Marlene defies orders and decides to find him on her own. Now, with Amick Hendar's security forces on high alert, Marlene must descend into the lower reaches of the Military Station to find the one man who may know Yuji's whereabouts: Science Director Seno Miyagi.
14	"Set"	January 21, 2000	August 26, 2003
Marlene finally reunites with Yuji in the laboratory in which he is being held. However, she must once again stand before the High Council to defend her actions, but this time she has Yuji at her side. When Chairman Victor reveals the Council's true reasons for recovering the Sleepers, Marlene is stunned to learn that Yuji may be humankind's last hope at taking back the Earth.
15	"Calm"	January 28, 2000	August 27, 2003
The High Council reluctantly agrees to let Yuji and Marlene work together again. After beginning an intensive new combat training with the newly-formed Sleeper Brigade, Yuji finds himself the object of another young Sleeper's attention. Even the sterile military environment of Second Earth cannot subdue all human urges, but as Yuji soon discovers, a little human contact could cost him everything.
16	"A Sign"	February 4, 2000	August 28, 2003
A large attack force is sent to Africa, the first wave in a new campaign to reclaim the planet from the Blue. Yuji is awed when a fellow Sleeper, Tony, wipes out an entire Blue nest on his own. Yuji determines to be the best at any cost. But is this unhealthy obsession with beating Tony really a symptom of a much greater problem?
17	"Eclosion"	February 11, 2000	September 1, 2003
Marlene notices that Yuji's behavior is getting stranger and stranger. On the battlefield, he is a force to be reckoned with, but he has an unhealthy obsession with destroying the Blue. Has Yuji turned into something that he once despised—a cold-blooded killer?
18	"Chaos"	February 18, 2000	September 2, 2003
Director Miyagi reveals to Marlene the true cause of Yuji's accelerated rate of achievement—an infestation of "B-cells" that has begun to eat away at his mind. Unless she can do something to stop it, Yuji's sanity will soon slip away completely.
19	"Collapse"	February 25, 2000	September 3, 2003
The Sleeper Brigades launch yet another offensive against the Blue in New York City, and Yuji's lust for battle grows out of control as his B-cells begin to take hold of his sanity. Meanwhile, a mutiny has begun on Second Earth, and Marlene finds herself with an integral part to play in the plan to overthrow the High Council. But Marlene has her own reasons for aiding Seno...
20	"Versus"	March 3, 2000	September 4, 2003
The second airborne operation meets with disaster when the Blue counterattack outnumbers Second Earth forces five-to-one. But even as the combat units are desperately falling back, Marlene pushes herself further into the battlefield. Knowing the horrible truth about Yuji's slipping sanity, she's determined to confront him on her own terms...and bring him back from the brink of self-destruction.
21	"Joker"	March 10, 2000	September 8, 2003
While Marlene flies a distraught Yuji back to Second Earth, Tony and Alicia use their Sleeper skills to take out the High Council. The sky is turned into the newest battleground for survival. Only this time, the Blue have mutated into something unthinkable...
22	"Dogma"	March 17, 2000	September 9, 2003
Yuji and Marlene infiltrate the Blue-infested Medical Station and are soon reunited with Rick and Soo. While Soo attempts a daring rescue of the station's hibernating civilian population, Marlene, Yuji, and Rick attack the heart of the problem – Tony and Alicia. But before they can reach their objective, they encounter an unexpected obstacle standing in their way.
23	"Soliste"	March 17, 2000	September 10, 2003
With Rick injured too severely to continue, Yuji and Marlene continue through the Medical Station alone. They arrive at the main computer room to find Tony waiting for them. Now Yuji must confront his one-time friend and rival, and the only way to stop him is to kill.
24	"Compass"	March 24, 2000	September 11, 2003
The remaining survivors aboard Second Earth begin to rebuild after Tony and Alicia's devastating attack. As Yuji contemplates his own place in this rapidly changing world, Director Miyagi lays out his plan to make Second Earth the permanent home of the human race. But there are dissidents hiding in the dark corners...and some of them carry guns.
25	"Adagio"	March 24, 2000	September 12, 2003
Satellite images of the Earth reveal a mass Blue migration in South America and Yuji and Marlene volunteer to investigate. Once on the surface, their team discovers that the Blue have mysteriously vanished without a trace. Now, the only hope Yuji has of finding answers lies deep underground in the dark tunnels below a massive Blue nest.
26	"Let Me"	March 31, 2000	September 16, 2003
A monstrous Blue has emerged in the heart of the South American nest, the only thing standing between Yuji and the answers he so desperately seeks. Unless Yuji wins this battle, all hope for the future is lost—for him, for Marlene, and for the entire human race.

== Blue Gender: The Warrior ==
The compilation movie, Blue Gender: The Warrior is composed of both old and new footage—with many clips being completely re-animated—and a very different ending. Roughly the last third of the original series' story arc was removed for the movie, thus requiring an alternative ending. It was released on November 20, 2002, and in English on July 20, 2004.

== Reception ==
Critical reception of Blue Gender has been mostly positive. Allen Divers of Anime News Network gave the series a rating of A dubbed and B subbed, praising the story, mecha and monster designs, animation, and characters, with his only complaint being that the series was too long, which slowed down the story telling. Animerica gave the series a positive review, stating that some might compare it to Starship Troopers, and concludes that "if you like action, mecha, hardcore sci-fi, and global plots, this series has a lot to offer." Todd Douglass Jr. of DVD Talk gave the series a rating of 4 out of 5 stars, praising the story, characters, and animation, and stated that "on the surface the show may seem stereotypical and familiar but once you actually delve into its depth you'll recognize it for what it truly is; an awesome show." Nerdgenic.com also gave the series a positive review, with their only criticisms being the main protagonist Yuji, and the slow progression of the plot. They handed out praise for the series' secondary protagonist Marlene, the story, and the mech and monster designs.

Not all reviews were positive, however. Issac Cynova of THEM Anime Reviews was far more critical, and gave the series a rating of 2 out of 5 stars, stating that "Blue Gender is one of those titles that hooks you right from the beginning, but then just fails to deliver."
