= Miwa Yasuda =

Japanese voice actress (born 1977)

Miwa Yasuda 安田 美和
- Born: December 6, 1977 (age 48); Hyōgo, Japan
- Occupation: Voice actress
- Years active: 1998–present

Miwa Yasuda (安田 美和, Yasuda Miwa; born December 6, 1977) is a Japanese voice actress. She was born in Hyōgo, and works for Aoni Production.

== Notable voice roles ==
=== Anime ===
- Blue Gender (Alicia Whistle)
- Boogiepop Phantom (Akane Kojima)
- Gakuen Alice (Ruka Nogi)
- Hand Maid May (Ikariya, Masato Zin)
- Kanon (Yuichi Aizawa (child))
- Kidou Shinsengumi Moeyo Ken (Seiryu)

=== Game ===
- Kidou Shinsengumi Moeyo Ken (Seiryu)
- King of Fighters: Maximum Impact (Mignon Beart)
- Rune Factory 2 (Alicia)
