= Hideo Kojima =

Japanese video game designer (born 1963)

- 小島 秀夫
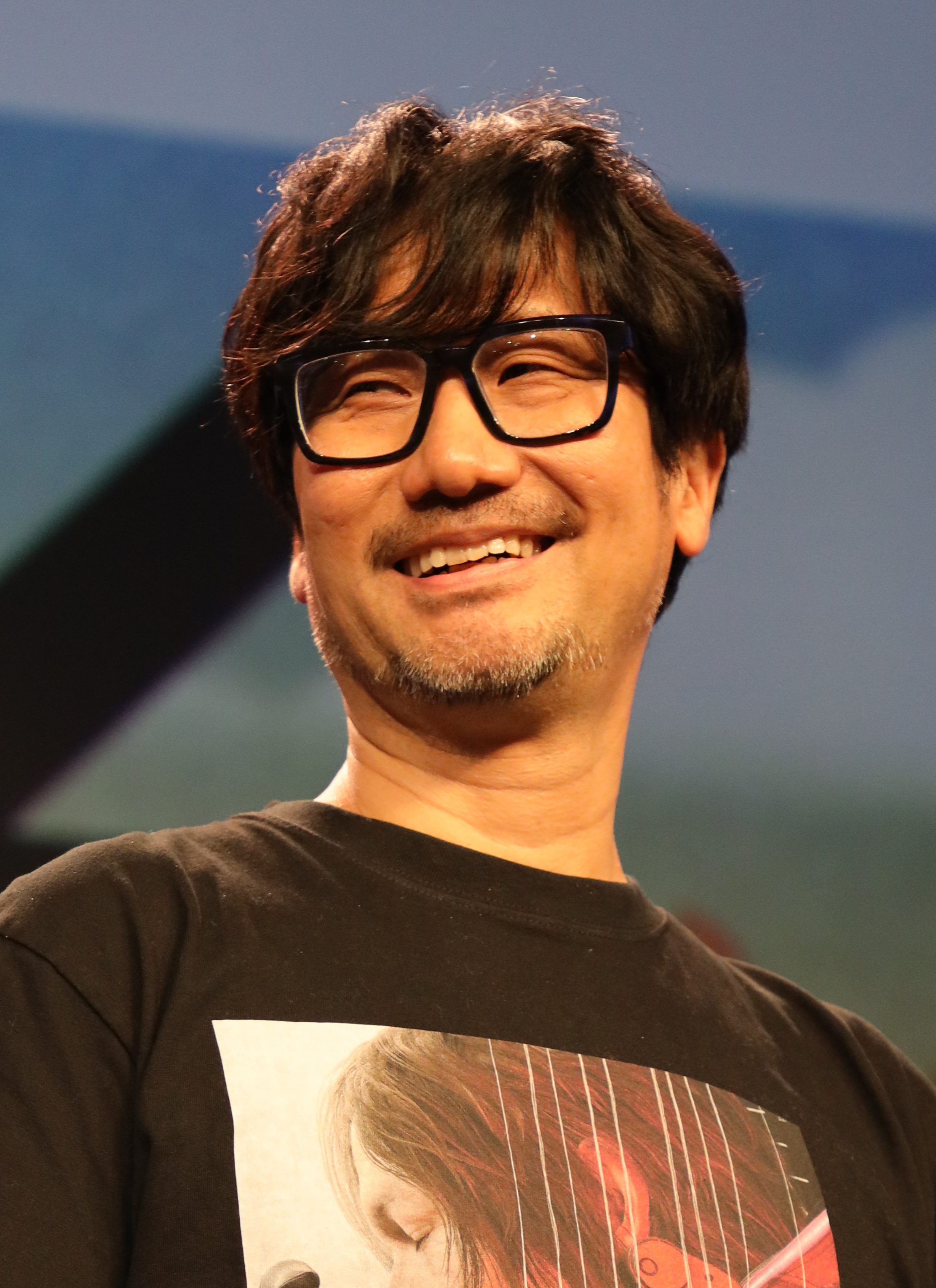
- Kojima in March 2025
- Born: August 24, 1963 (age 63); Setagaya, Tokyo, Japan
- Occupations: Video game designer; writer; director; producer
- Years active: 1986–present
- Employer(s): Konami (1986–2015); Kojima Productions (2015–present)
- Known for: Metal Gear; Death Stranding
- Children: 2
- Website: kojimaproductions.jp

Hideo Kojima (小島 秀夫, Kojima Hideo; born August 24, 1963) is a Japanese video game designer, writer, director, and producer. He is best known for the Metal Gear franchise, which remains his most famous and acclaimed work. His games are noted for being highly cinematic, the result of a passion for film and literature which began during his childhood, and he is regarded as a pioneering auteur of video games.

Upon joining Konami in 1986, Kojima directed, designed, and wrote Metal Gear (1987) for the MSX2. The game laid the foundation for the stealth game genre and the renowned Metal Gear franchise, which he continued to direct for 28 years up to Metal Gear Solid V: The Phantom Pain (2015). During his time at Konami, he created Boktai and produced Zone of the Enders and Castlevania: Lords of Shadow, as well as directing Snatcher (1988) and Policenauts (1994), which were graphic adventure games that came to be regarded for their cinematic presentation.

Kojima founded Kojima Productions within Konami in 2005, and in 2011 he was appointed vice president of Konami Digital Entertainment. In 2014, Kojima was revealed as the director for Silent Hills, the next installment in the Silent Hill franchise, via the playable teaser P.T. which has been cited as one of the greatest horror games of all time. However, the game was cancelled by Konami in 2015, shortly before Kojima's departure from the company. He then re-established Kojima Productions as an independent studio in December 2015, and, in partnership with Sony, released his first games outside Konami with Death Stranding (2019) and Death Stranding 2: On the Beach (2025).

Following the end of his studio's collaboration with Sony, Kojima is directing the upcoming games OD and Physint in association with Xbox. A longtime film enthusiast, he announced in 2019 that his studio would expand into film production, and is currently serving as producer for three Death Stranding adaptations.

== Early life ==
Kojima was born in the Setagaya ward of Tokyo on August 24, 1963. He has two older siblings. His father, Kingo, was a pharmacist who frequently traveled for business and named his son Hideo as it was the most common name among the doctors he met. He moved with his family to Osaka at the age of four; he later described this stage of his early life as an abrupt change of environment that led him to spend much of his time thereafter indoors, where he would watch television or make figurines. His parents were passionate about cinema—especially European films, horror, and Wild West—and began a nightly tradition of watching a film with their children, who were not allowed to go to bed until the film had finished; his parents also did not limit the type of films the children were allowed to see, regardless of content.

Kojima took an interest in filmmaking when a friend brought a Super 8 camera to high school and began making films together, charging other children ¥50 to see them. He tricked his parents into funding a four-day trip to an island off the coast of Japan without telling them that he was going there because he wanted to use it as a filming location; however, he instead spent his time there swimming, and changed the film's plot to be about zombies on the final day as this idea would be quicker to shoot. He did not show the film to his parents.

By Kojima's teenage years, the family had moved to the city of Kawanishi, Hyōgo. When he was 13 years old, his father died. In interviews, he has discussed the impact of his father's death and the subsequent financial hardship faced by his family. He studied economics at university, where he decided to join the video game industry. He wrote fiction while studying, even including a short story in his thesis.

== Career ==
=== Early career ===
While still in university, Kojima was initially searching for a way into the film industry. He hoped that if he were to win awards for his written fiction, he would be approached about directing a film. At that time, he saw Nintendo's Famicom and thought of joining the video game industry. He said he had no friends interested in cinema to encourage him, and his friends were also not supportive when he announced his intention to enter game development. He would frequently lie about his occupation in the early days of his career, when working in video games was seen as a "very low status" job and the word for a video game designer did not exist in the Japanese language, and instead told people he worked for a financial firm; during a wedding reception, the other guests laughed at him when the groom introduced him by saying, "[Kojima's] a very talented and otherwise likeable person. But I am sorry to say that, for some unknown reason, he has decided to join a video game company."

Kojima joined video game publisher Konami's MSX home computer division in 1986. He applied to Konami because it was the only game developer listed on the Japanese stock exchange. He was disappointed with the job initially, hoping to make games for the Famicom, and feeling that the 16 colour palette of the MSX was too restrictive. The first game he worked on was Penguin Adventure, the sequel to Antarctic Adventure, as an assistant director. It significantly expanded upon the gameplay of Antarctic Adventure, adding more action game elements, a greater variety of levels, role-playing elements such as upgrading equipment, and multiple endings. In 2019, Polygon's Julia Lee wrote that for "a game made over 30 years ago, Penguin Adventure had some in-depth features". After Penguin Adventure, Kojima started to design a game called Lost Warld [sic], but the game was canceled when it was found to be too complex to run on the MSX.

=== Metal Gear and Snatcher (1987–1990) ===
Kojima was asked to take over a project, Metal Gear, from a senior associate. Hardware limitations hindered the development of the game's combat, and Kojima altered the gameplay to focus on a prisoner escaping instead of fighting, inspired by The Great Escape. It was released on July 13, 1987, for the MSX2 home computer in Japan, and in September that year for Europe. The player controls a special forces operative codenamed Solid Snake, who is sent to the fortified state of Outer Heaven to stop a nuclear-equipped walking tank known as "Metal Gear". Metal Gear is one of the earliest examples of the stealth game genre. A port of Metal Gear was released for the Nintendo Entertainment System in 1987, with altered graphics, difficulty, and an abridged ending without the titular weapon. Kojima has openly criticized many of the changes made in the port, including poor translation and the abridged ending. In an interview, a programmer on the NES version of the game said his team were asked to complete the port in only three months, and the NES hardware was not capable of implementing the Metal Gear fight.

His next project was the graphic adventure game Snatcher, released for the NEC PC-8801 and MSX2 computer platforms in Japan on November 26, 1988. Kojima wrote and directed the game. Kojima planned for the game, a graphic adventure with visual novel elements, to have six chapters, but was instructed to trim it down to two. The team wanted to create a third chapter, but were already over the allowed development schedule so were forced to end the game on a cliffhanger. The cyberpunk-influenced game has a semi-open world design. Kojima and character designer Tomiharu Kinoshita treated the project like making a film or anime rather than a game. Former Konami artist Satoshi Yoshoioka, who designed many of Snatcher's characters, said he was persistently guided by Kojima to make the game as cinematic as possible, which later critics have cited as a staple of his work. Adrian Chen of The New York Times wrote that one of his innovations was "the way he applied cinematic storytelling to console video games". Snatcher draws heavily from Ridley Scott's Blade Runner (1982), and includes enough references that the game strays near copyright infringement. A port for the Sega CD was made without Kojima, but the amount of text and length of the script made localisation expensive and time-consuming, taking three months. Snatcher was modestly successful in Japan, but the western port was a commercial failure, selling only a few thousand units. It has developed a cult following in the west.

In 1990, Kojima wrote a remake of Snatcher, SD Snatcher, a role-playing video game which adapted the storyline of the original Snatcher but significantly changed the environments, details of the plot, and core gameplay mechanics. The "SD" stands for "super deformed" in Japanese media, another way to reference chibi character designs. The characters are depicted in a "super deformed" art style, in contrast to the original game's realistic style. Like the original computer versions of Snatcher, it was only released in Japan. It abandoned random encounters and introduced a first-person turn-based battle system where the player can aim at specific parts of the enemy's body with guns. Such a battle system has rarely been used since, but similar ones can later be found in the role-playing games Square's Vagrant Story (2000), Bethesda Softworks's Fallout 3 (2008), and Nippon Ichi's Last Rebellion (2010). In 2007, J. C. Fletcher of Engadget said that Kojima's choice to stylise the character designs "was some postmodern playfulness from Hideo Kojima [...] downplaying the dramatic aspects of his game and overlaying obvious video game conventions on top of it", and connected that to a similar playfulness in his later games.

=== Metal Gear 2 and Policenauts (1990–1994) ===
The original Metal Gear was a commercial success for its release on the NES, and Konami decided to create a sequel to the game, Snake's Revenge, without the involvement of Kojima. When Kojima was riding on the Tokyo transit system, he was told about Snake's Revenge by a colleague working on the project, who asked him to make a new Snake game of his own. As a result, Kojima began work on his own sequel, Metal Gear 2: Solid Snake, and the two were both released in 1990. Kojima's game would not be released overseas in North America and Europe until its inclusion in Metal Gear Solid 3: Subsistence (2006). Metal Gear 2: Solid Snake was a commercial success. The game has received positive reviews from retro-reviewers. IGN notes that Metal Gear 2 introduced stealth mechanics such as making noise to attract guards, crouching and crawling on the ground, disarming mines, and enemies having view cones.

After memory limitation issues prompted him to take a break during the development of Snatcher, Kojima began to explore concepts for Policenauts. He wanted the game to remain in the adventure genre, feeling it was the best method to express what he wanted with video games. He was also growing frustrated with game development and wanted "a way to take creative control back from the programmers". After the release of Metal Gear 2: Solid Snake (1990), he developed a scripting engine so he could decide when animations and music played instead of the programmers. Development on Policenauts, originally called Beyond, began in 1990, and lasted four years.

Policenauts was released in Japan on July 29, 1994, for the PC-9821. In Japan, critics praised Policenauts for its high level of presentation. Both Sega Saturn Magazine and Famitsu praised the quality of animation, voice acting, and its engrossing setting. Retrospective reviews have regarded the game generally positively, and sought to contextualise Policenauts within Kojima's body of work, as heavily stylized and influenced by films.

=== Metal Gear Solid subseries and mainstream success (1994–2012) ===
In 1994, Kojima began to plan a 3D sequel to Metal Gear 2: Solid Snake, titled Metal Gear Solid and originally planned for release on the 3DO Interactive Multiplayer. After the 3DO was discontinued, development shifted to the Sony PlayStation. For the transition from 2D to 3D graphics, a new engine had to be developed by Kojima and his team. A gameplay demo was first revealed to the public at the 1996 Tokyo Game Show, and was later shown on day 2 of E3 1997 as a short video. The game was released to critical acclaim. Many outlets noted the game's cinematic qualities and innovative stealth gameplay. Kojima became a celebrity in video game news media, and was surprised when he began to be recognized in public.

In early 2001, Kojima released the first details of the sequel to Metal Gear Solid, Metal Gear Solid 2: Sons of Liberty, for the PlayStation 2. The game's highly detailed graphics, physics, and expanded gameplay quickly made it one of the most anticipated games at the time. The game was highly successful and critically acclaimed at release, due to its graphics, gameplay, and storyline, which dealt with myriad philosophical themes as specific as memes, censorship, manipulation, patricide, the inherent flaws of democracy and as grandiose as the nature of reality itself. While Metal Gear Solid 2 appealed to gamers with the discussion of these, the bewildering maze of dialogue and plot revelation in the final hours of the game was a disappointment for many gamers, who expected the Hollywood-style resolution of its forerunner.

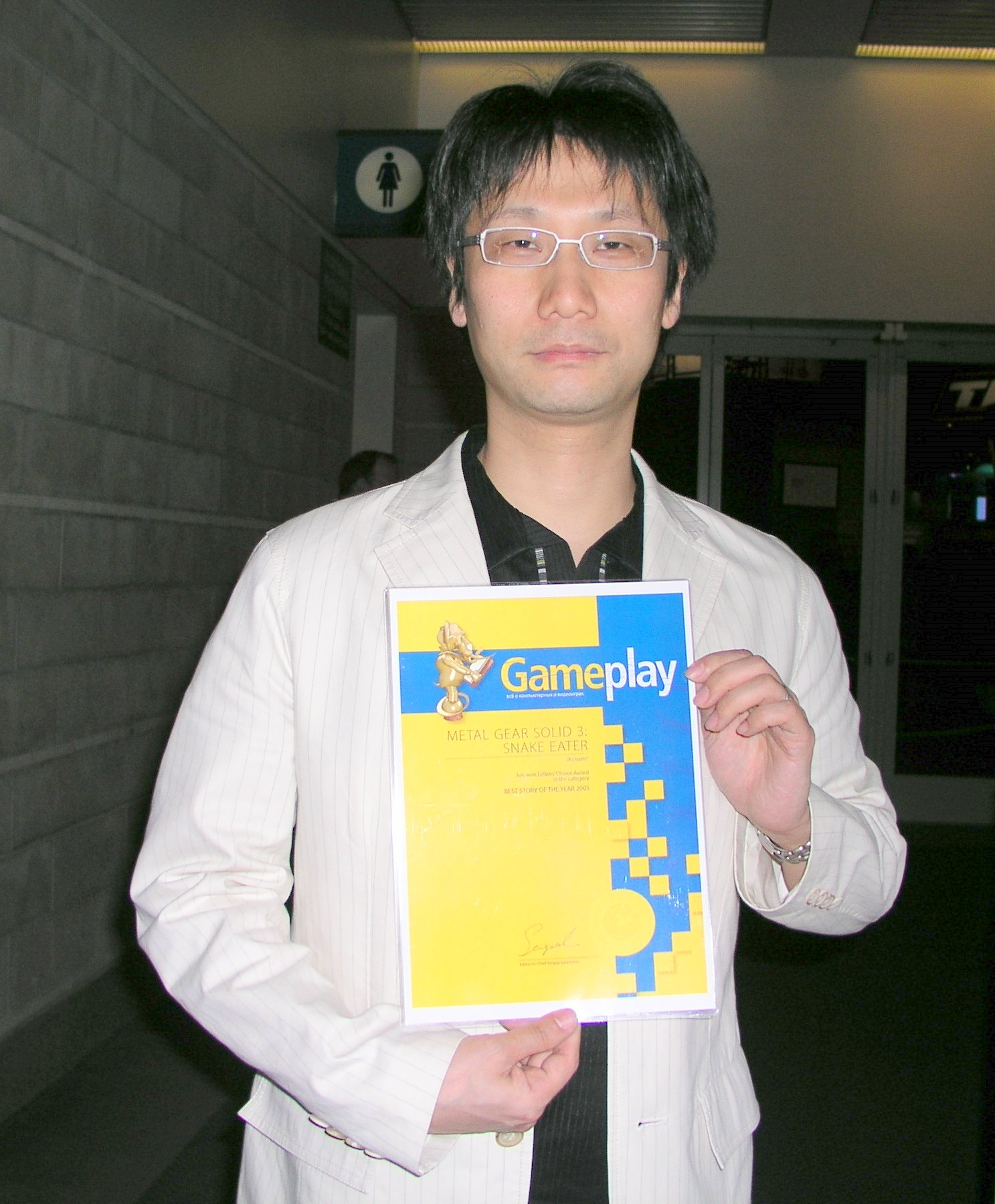
Kojima at E3 2006 holding a Gameplay award for Best Story of the Year 2005

Before Metal Gear Solid 2 was released, Kojima produced the game and anime franchise Zone of the Enders in 2001 to moderate success. In 2003, he produced Boktai: The Sun Is in Your Hand for the Game Boy Advance, in which players take the role of a young vampire hunter who uses a solar weapon charged by a photometric sensor on the game cartridge, forcing them to play in sunlight. Another team inside Konami, in a collaboration with Silicon Knights, began work on Metal Gear Solid: The Twin Snakes, a GameCube enhanced remake of the first Metal Gear Solid with all the gameplay features of Metal Gear Solid 2 and with cutscenes redirected by director Ryuhei Kitamura.

Afterwards, Kojima designed and released Metal Gear Solid 3: Snake Eater for the PlayStation 2. Unlike the previous games in the series, which took place in the near future and focused on indoor locations, the game is set in a Soviet jungle during the height of the Cold War in 1964, and features wilderness survival, camouflage, and James Bond styled espionage. The North American version was released on November 17, 2004, with the Japanese counterpart following on December 16. The European version was released on March 4, 2005. Critical response to the game was highly favorable. Kojima has said that his mother played it, "It took her an entire year to complete Metal Gear Solid 3. She would get her friends to help her. When she defeated The End, [a character the player faces off during the game] she called me up and said: 'It is finished'."

At that time, Kojima produced Boktai's sequel, Boktai 2: Solar Boy Django for the Game Boy Advance. Released in summer 2004, it makes more extensive use of the cartridge's sunlight sensor and allows players to combine various new solar weapons. Also released was Metal Gear Acid for the PlayStation Portable handheld. A turn-based game, it is less action-oriented than the other Metal Gear games and focuses more on strategy. It was released in Japan on December 16, 2004. Its sequel, Metal Gear Acid 2, was released on March 21, 2006.

Kojima wanted Solid Snake to appear in Super Smash Bros. Melee, but Nintendo refused, due to development cycle problems. When Super Smash Bros. Brawl was in development, series director Masahiro Sakurai contacted Kojima to work and add Snake and content related to the Metal Gear series, including a stage based on Shadow Moses Island (the main setting of Solid), into the game.

Released in June 2008, Kojima co-directed Metal Gear Solid 4: Guns of the Patriots alongside Shuyo Murata. Initially, Kojima was not going to be director, but death threats made against him made the team nervous, and he made the decision to work with them.

Kojima received a lifetime achievement award at the MTV Game Awards 2008 in Germany. In his speech, he said in English, "I have to say, even though I received this award, let me state that I will not retire. I will continue to create games as long as I live".

Before E3 2009, Kojima stated interest in working with a Western developer. This later turned out to be a collaboration between him and Spanish developer MercurySteam to work on Castlevania: Lords of Shadow.

Although he announced that Metal Gear Solid 4: Guns of the Patriots would be the last Metal Gear game he would be directly involved in, he announced at E3 2009 that he would return to help on two Metal Gear games: Metal Gear Solid: Rising, as a producer and Metal Gear Solid: Peace Walker as writer, director, and producer. When interviewed at Gamescom 2009, Kojima stated that he got more involved with Peace Walker because "there was a lot of confusion within the team and it didn't proceed as I wanted it to. Therefore I thought that I needed to jump in and do Peace Walker".

Kojima during the 2011 Tokyo Game Show

Kojima was at E3 2010 to show off his team's latest project, Metal Gear Solid: Rising. He was also seen in Nintendo's 3DS interview video, where he stated he was interested in making a Metal Gear Solid game for the 3DS and wondered what it would be like in 3D. This game ended up being a remake of Metal Gear Solid 3 titled Metal Gear Solid: Snake Eater 3D. In late 2011, Metal Gear Solid: Rising was renamed Metal Gear Rising: Revengeance with PlatinumGames being involved in developing it alongside Kojima Productions. Nevertheless, Kojima is the game's executive producer and showed interest in working in the game's demo. Kojima was satisfied with the final product and expressed the possibility of a sequel if Platinum were to develop it.

On April 1, 2011, Konami promoted Kojima to Executive Vice President and Corporate Officer. At E3 2011, he revealed a new gaming technology named "transfarring", a portmanteau of the verbs transferring and sharing, which allows gamers to transfer their game data between the PlayStation 3 and the PlayStation Portable. Transfarring was used in Metal Gear Solid: Peace Walker and the Metal Gear Solid HD Collection. Later that year, he stated he was working on a new intellectual property with Goichi Suda, tentatively titled Project S, and preparing new projects. On July 8, 2011, Kojima announced that Project S was a radio-show sequel to Snatcher, titled Sdatcher as a reference to the show's producer Suda. The show would air on Fridays on Kojima's bi-weekly Internet radio show, starting with episode No. 300 which was broadcast in August 2011. In October, Kojima announced that he would be collaborating with Suda and 5pb. director Chiyomaru Shikura in producing a new adventure game visual novel. It was initially speculated that the game would be the third entry in 5pb.'s Science Adventure series, but it was later confirmed to be a separate title. The game was planned to have an overseas release and an anime adaption. As of 2023, no further news regarding the project has been released.

=== Final Konami projects and departure (2012–2015) ===
In mid-2012 and in the following years after Kojima finished work on the Fox Engine, Kojima was connected to the Silent Hill series. During this time, he indicated that he was interested in making a Silent Hill game and the first instance of this was on August 18, 2012. He described his excitement regarding the potential use of the Fox Engine on the eighth generation platforms via a tweet of an image of the DVD for the Silent Hill film: Later, he added what he had in mind for this game in a series of tweets: "Silent Hill is in closed room setting and doesn't require full action so that we can focus on the graphic quality. Enemies featured in the game do not have to be consistent or move fast. It only requires scariness by graphics and presentation. As being a creator, making action games in an open world setting, such a type of game is very enviously attractive. If only someone could create this on the Fox Engine." After a while, and as a result of Kojima's interest in making a Silent Hill game, Konami asked him to do so. Kojima explained the story in an interview with Eurogamer:

Kojima at the Game Developers Conference in 2013

In the past I've mentioned Silent Hill in interviews, and as a result of that the president of Konami rung me up and said he'd like me to make the next Silent Hill. Honestly, I'm kind of a scaredy-cat when it comes to horror movies, so I'm not confident I can do it. At the same time, there's a certain type of horror that only people who are scared of can create, so maybe it's something I can do. That said, I think Silent Hill has a certain atmosphere. I think it has to continue, and I'd love to help it continue, and if I can help by supervising or lending the technology of the Fox Engine, then I'd love to participate in that respect.

Additionally, in an interview with Geoff Keighley, when a fan asked "which game do you want to direct or reboot?" Kojima stated without hesitation, "Silent Hill." Keighley jumped in and asked "What do you want to do with Silent Hill?" Kojima responded: "A guy [like myself] that is such a chicken and is so easily scared – making a scary game – I'm very confident that something horrifying would come out from that. But on the other hand I would have to prepare myself to have nightmares every single day. Hopefully sometime in the future I'm able to work on this, but I would really need to prepare to have daily nightmares". In August 2014, the free horror game P.T. was released without announcement on the PlayStation Store by seemingly unknown developers "7780s Studio": it very quickly became popular and received critical acclaim. Its ending revealed that the game's title stands for 'playable teaser', that "7780s Studio" was a pseudonym for Kojima Productions, and that it was a demo for a new game in the Silent Hill franchise titled Silent Hills, set to be directed by Kojima, alongside Mexican film director Guillermo del Toro, for the PlayStation 4. However, in April 2015, the playable teaser was removed from online storefronts and Konami announced that the game was cancelled. Despite never reaching a full release, P.T. remains as one of Kojima's most acclaimed works and is considered among the greatest horror games of all time.

At the 2013 Game Developers Conference, Kojima unveiled Metal Gear Solid V: The Phantom Pain, which was set to be his final Metal Gear game, noting that this time unlike previous announcements that he had stopped working on the series, was very serious about leaving; it was preceded by Metal Gear Solid V: Ground Zeroes, a shorter game released in 2014 and serving as a prologue to The Phantom Pain. In March 2015, reports began to surface that Kojima would part ways with longtime publisher Konami after the release of The Phantom Pain. Konami later stated that they were auditioning for new staff for future Metal Gear titles and removed Kojima's name from the series' marketing material. On July 10, 2015, Kojima's collaborative voice actor Akio Ōtsuka revealed that Konami had closed Kojima Productions; despite reports that Kojima left the company in October 2015, a spokesman for Konami stated that he was "taking a long time off from work." At The Game Awards 2015, Metal Gear Solid V won the awards for Best Action Game and Best Score/Soundtrack, but Kojima did not attend the event, being reportedly barred from attending by Konami. Instead, the award was accepted by Kiefer Sutherland on his behalf. On February 18, 2016, Metal Gear Solid V won the award for Adventure Game of the Year at the 19th Annual D.I.C.E. Awards.

=== Independent studio (2015–present) ===
==== Death Stranding ====
On December 16, 2015, Kojima announced that Kojima Productions would be re-established as an independent studio, partnered with Sony Computer Entertainment, and that his first game would be exclusive to PlayStation 4. At E3 2016, Kojima personally announced the game's title as Death Stranding in a trailer. The trailer featured Norman Reedus, who was set to play the protagonist in Kojima's previous work, the canceled Silent Hills. Trailers leading up to release also revealed the castings of actors Mads Mikkelsen, Léa Seydoux, Margaret Qualley, Troy Baker, Tommie Earl Jenkins, and Lindsay Wagner for the game, as well as special appearances from film directors Guillermo del Toro, who Kojima was set to collaborate with on Silent Hills, and Nicolas Winding Refn.

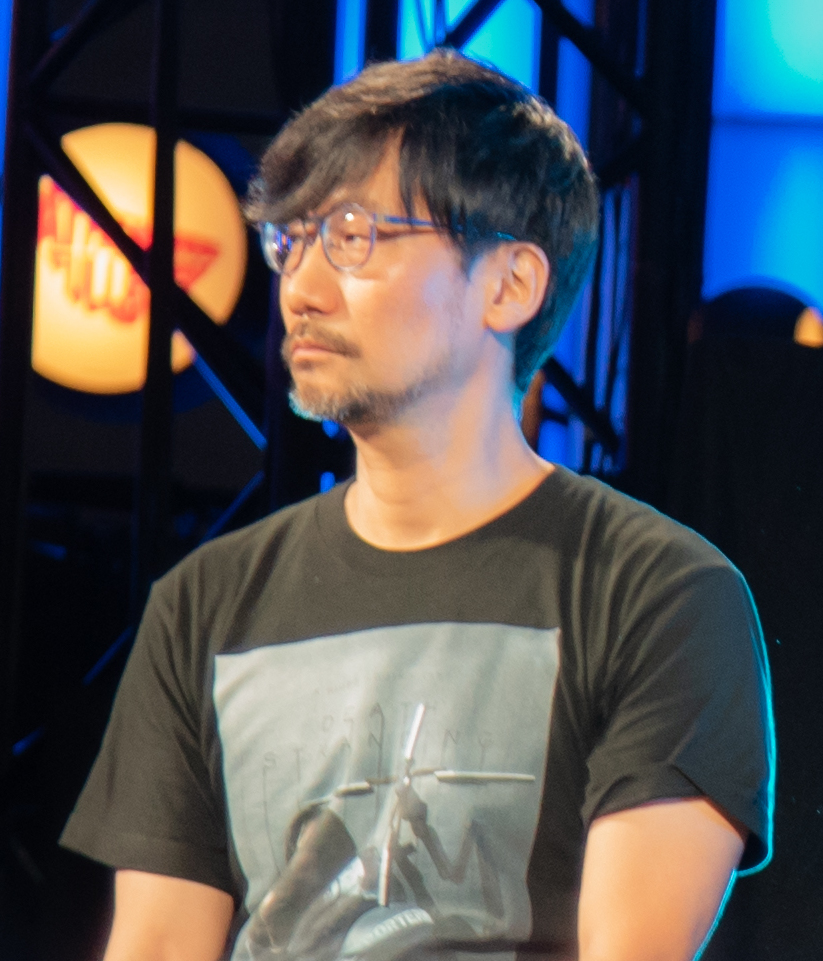
Kojima promoting Death Stranding at the Tokyo Game Show in 2018

Death Stranding was released on November 8, 2019. It received generally positive reviews and was a commercial success. It also won a number of awards, including "Best Game Direction" and "Best Score/Music" at The Game Awards 2019, and "Outstanding Achievement in Audio Design" and "Outstanding Technical Achievement" at the 23rd Annual D.I.C.E. Awards. In November 2019, talking to BBC Newsbeat as part of a documentary about Death Stranding, Kojima said "In the future Kojima Productions will start making films. If you can do one thing well, then you can do everything well". Kojima went on to explain that he sees that films, television series, and games competing in the same space in the future, thanks to streaming technology, and that this will encourage new formats to emerge. "I'm very interested in the new format of game that will appear on there and that's what I want to take on," Kojima added.

At several game exhibitions in 2022, Kojima cryptically teased the casting of an upcoming title being developed by Kojima Productions, with Elle Fanning and Shioli Kutsuna confirmed to star. It was unknown whether the game would be related to Death Stranding, or a previously announced Xbox collaboration, or an entirely different project. At The Game Awards 2022, Kojima officially revealed the upcoming title as Death Stranding 2, again developed in collaboration with Sony. Reedus, Seydoux, and Troy Baker were confirmed to be returning from the first game, with Fanning and Kutsuna revealed to be the new cast members of the game.

On March 9, 2025, the castings of Luca Marinelli, Alissa Jung, Alastair Duncan, and Debra Wilson for the game were announced, as well as special appearances from film directors Fatih Akin and George Miller. A collaboration with French singer-songwriter Woodkid for a soundtrack album for the game was also revealed.

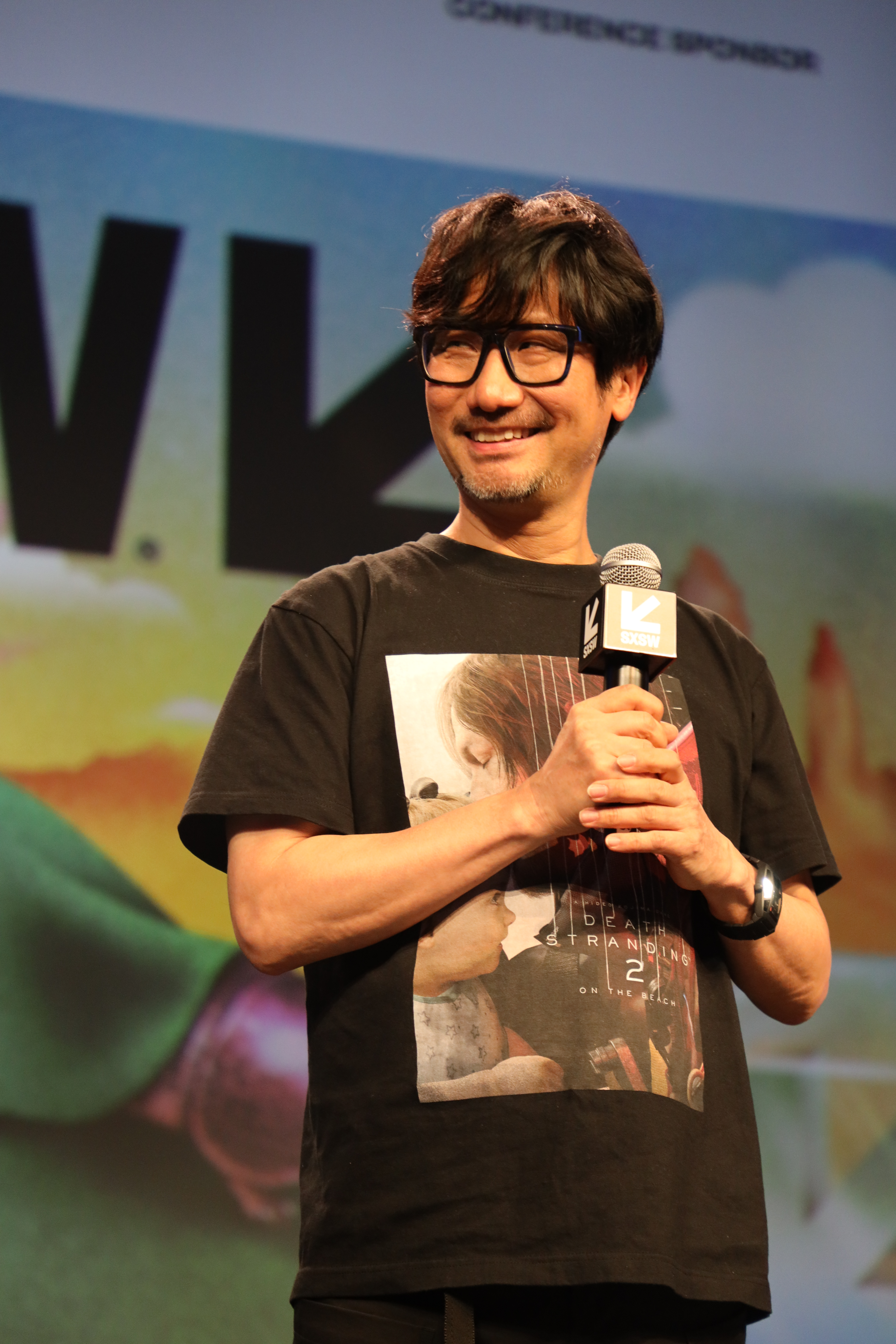
Kojima at SXSW announcing Death Stranding 2's release date in March 2025

Kojima began writing Death Stranding 2 some time prior to 2020, but reworked his narrative from scratch to reflect the effect of COVID-19 on the worldwide population and himself. Moreover, approximately half-way through the game's development, Kojima rewrote the script again in order to make it more polarising after it performed very well with test audiences. Kojima explained to the game's co-composer Woodkid:

We have a problem. I'm going to be very honest, we have been testing the game with players and the results are too good. They like it too much. That means something is wrong; we have to change something. If everyone likes it, it means it's mainstream. It means it's conventional. It means it's already pre-digested for people to like it. And I don't want that. I want people to end up liking things they didn't like when they first encountered it, because that's where you really end up loving something.

Yoji Shinkawa and Kojima promoting Death Stranding 2 in Lucca, Italy in November 2025

Death Stranding 2: On the Beach was released on June 26, 2025. It was met with critical acclaim on release, with particular praise directed towards its visual fidelity, acting performances, improved combat and gameplay, soundtrack and narrative. Some critics commended it as Kojima's best work. When asked about the future of Death Stranding in an interview, Kojima stated that he is not planning to direct a third instalment, although he has drafted a concept for it and is open to "pass it on to someone else".

In June 2026, Sony ended its nearly 11-year partnership with Kojima during the development of his studio's next game, Physint. Following the announcement, reports suggested that the commercial performance of Death Stranding 2 may have been a factor in the decision to end the collaboration. Despite receiving highly favorable reviews from critics and fans upon release, the game was reported to have underperformed commercially, only selling 1.9 million units on the PlayStation 5 by September 2026, more than a year after its release, and generating $130 million in revenue against a reported budget of between $150 and $200 million. Kojima denied claims that Death Stranding 2 was financially unsuccessful in an interview, calling the reports "unsubstantiated speculation" and stating that his studio remains in a "healthy, profitable state".

===== Adaptations =====
On December 14, 2023, Kojima and film studio A24 announced that a live-action feature film adaptation of Death Stranding had started production. Kojima was approached to direct but declined, and instead Michael Sarnoski was announced as its director in April 2025. An animated film was also confirmed to be in the works in May 2025 in collaboration with Line Mileage studios with an original story by Aaron Guzikowski and was officially revealed with the working title Death Stranding: Mosquito through a short teaser trailer in September 2025. In November 2025, Disney+ unveiled Death Stranding Isolations, an anime television series produced by E&H Productions and set to release in 2027. Kojima was announced as executive producer for the series, with Takayuki Sano as director.

==== OD ====
In June 2022, Kojima and Microsoft revealed that Kojima Productions would be working on a game with Xbox Game Studios that will use Microsoft's cloud-based tech. At The Game Awards 2023, Kojima and filmmaker Jordan Peele revealed the title as a horror game named OD alongside a short trailer. Sophia Lillis, Hunter Schafer, and Udo Kier joined the cast for the game. In September 2025, it was announced that the title would be an anthology game, with each episode being written by a different director, a team of writers which Kojima referred to as "the horror Avengers". Kojima revealed his episode's title, "KNOCK", with a short teaser trailer, and Peele was confirmed to be directing his own episode. Several critics noted similarities between OD and Kojima's earlier work, the Silent Hills playable teaser P.T, and have generally regarded OD as its spiritual successor.

==== Physint ====
On January 31, 2024, during the PlayStation State of Play event, Kojima announced that he is planning to return to the action-espionage genre after the release of Death Stranding 2 and OD. The game was revealed to have the working title Physint and would be developed in collaboration with Sony. On September 23, 2025, during the Kojima Productions' tenth anniversary event, a new promotional poster featuring the game's obscured protagonist was revealed, as well as the castings of actors Charlee Fraser, Ma Dong-seok, and Minami Hamabe for the project. The game was announced to still be in the 'casting stage' by this point, having faced delays due to the SAG-AFTRA strike.

In June 2026, Sony informed Kojima Productions that they were pulling out of development for Physint and cutting its funding. After three months of searching for a publisher, it was announced on September 9, 2026, that Xbox Game Studios, who were already partnered with Kojima Productions for the upcoming horror game OD, had expanded their partnership with Kojima and agreed to publish Physint and finance its development. Shortly after, on September 17, 2026, Kojima revealed that actor Bill Skarsgård joined the cast of the game as the protagonist character.

== Influences and mentality ==
Kojima has cited Yuji Horii's The Portopia Serial Murder Case (1983) and Shigeru Miyamoto's Super Mario Bros. (1985) as the games that inspired him to enter the video game industry. Portopia Serial Murder Case, a murder mystery adventure game, was an important influence because, according to Kojima, it had "mystery, a 3D dungeon, humor, and a proper background and explanation of why the murderer committed the crime. That is why there was drama in this game. Me encountering this game expanded the potential of video games in my mind." He also stated that it "taught me that one can tell a story and develop plots around a scenario in the game genre". Portopia had an influence on his early works, including Metal Gear and particularly Snatcher.

Kojima's love of film is noticeable in his games where he pays homage through his stories and characters, sometimes to the point of pastiche, as in Snatcher. He cited a contrast between films and games as while in his games he intends to portray violence like in a movie, in the game it is up to the player to decide. He wants people to understand the effects of violence. As he considers the games too stressful, he also wants comic relief to contrast it.

Snatcher is inspired by many science fiction films, particularly from the 1980s, including Blade Runner, Akira, The Thing, Invasion of the Body Snatchers, and The Terminator. Examples of influence by films include Solid Snake's codename (named after Snake Plissken from Escape from New York), Snake's alias in MGS2: Pliskin (in reference to the last name of Snake Plissken from the Escape movies), Snake's real name (Dave from 2001: A Space Odyssey), and Snake's trademark bandana (The Deer Hunter).

Film would also have an influence on other aspects of his games. Hal "Otacon" Emmerich (named after HAL 9000 from 2001: A Space Odyssey and film director Roland Emmerich), Sniper Wolf shooting Meryl in Metal Gear Solid (Full Metal Jacket), Psycho Mantis (inspired from the film The Fury), and the whole Metal Gear stealth concept (The Great Escape and The Guns of Navarone). James Bond also had a large influence on the Metal Gear series, with Metal Gear Solid 3 having a James Bond-like introduction sequence. Kojima has written that Metal Gear was "strongly influenced" by the "anti-war and anti-nuke" themes of the Planet of the Apes film franchise.

In an article he wrote for Official PlayStation 2 Magazine, Kojima described the influence of the film Dawn of the Dead on the Metal Gear series. The zombie classic inspired "the maximum three-dimensional use of a closed area like a shopping mall with elevators, air ducts, and escalators". These aspects are similar enough in his view that "Metal Gear Solid is Dawn of the Dead if you replace soldiers with zombies [sic]."

He also received inspiration from anime. His early works, particularly the cyberpunk adventure game Snatcher (which uses anime-style art), were influenced by cyberpunk anime, most notably Akira (mentioned above). In an interview, he mentioned that his Zone of the Enders series was inspired by mecha anime, such as Neon Genesis Evangelion. Mecha anime was also an inspiration for the Metal Gear series, which features mecha robots, such as Metal Gear REX and Metal Gear RAY; this is referred to in Metal Gear Solid, where Otacon mentions mecha anime as an influence on his Metal Gear REX designs.

In regards to storyline development and interaction with them, he said:

Storytelling is very difficult. But adding the flavor helps to relay the storytelling, meaning in a cut scene, with a set camera and effects, you can make the users feel sorrow, or make them happy or laugh. This is an easy approach, which we have been doing. That is one point, the second point is that if I make multiple storylines and allow the users to select which story, this might really sacrifice the deep emotion the user might feel; when there's a concrete storyline, and you kind of go along that rail, you feel the destiny of the story, which at the end, makes you feel more moved. But when you make it interactive – if you want multiple stories where you go one way or another – will that make the player more moved when he or she finishes the game? These two points are really the key which I am thinking about, and if this works, I think I could probably introduce a more interactive storytelling method.

Kojima listed Another World on the Super Nintendo Entertainment System, The Legend of Zelda: A Link to the Past, Operation Wolf's arcade version, The Portopia Serial Murder Case on the Famicom, Super Mario Bros., and Xevious's arcade version as his favorite games in 2000. He stated that A Link to the Past was his favorite game by Miyamoto.

In 2019, Kojima published a collection of essays in Japan discussing the influence of pop culture on his work under the title The Gifted Gene and My Lovable Memes. The book was published in English by Viz Media in October 2021 under the title The Creative Gene: How Books, Movies, and Music Inspired the Creator of Death Stranding and Metal Gear Solid.

In terms of reverse influence on film, his work on the storylines of the Metal Gear series was cited as an influence by screenwriter David Hayter, the voice actor for Solid Snake, on his screenwriting for Hollywood films. He stated that "Kojima and I have different styles (...) but I've certainly learned things from him, especially about ambiguity and telling a story without giving all the answers".

Kojima has also influenced a number of actors and auteurs in the film industry. Hollywood actors Mads Mikkelsen and Léa Seydoux have voice roles in Death Stranding, while director Guillermo del Toro is amongst his biggest fans.

In 2020, Kojima was a member of the international Jury of the 77th Venice International Film Festival, Virtual Reality section.

Kojima launched his own YouTube channel in 2016, where he and film critic Kenji Yano discuss their favorite films and matters pertaining to Kojima's studio. Starting in 2017, Kojima became a regular contributor to Rolling Stone, often discussing recent film releases, and occasionally drawing comparisons to his own works. In 2022, Kojima began a podcast for Spotify called Hideo Kojima presents Brain Structure. The podcast, hosted by Kojima with regular appearances from Geoff Keighley, focuses on Kojima's history with game development, as well as his interests in books, music, and cinema.

In 2025, in conjunction with the promotion of the Death Stranding 2, Hideo Kojima embarked on an international tour called the World Strand Tour 2025. During the stop in Lucca, in Italy, Kojima stated: “In the past, I said that 70% of my body is made of films; of that, 35% is made up of Italian cinema,” emphasizing the importance of Italian cinema in shaping his narrative and visual sensibility. The statement was widely reported by both specialized and mainstream media, helping to strengthen the connection between the Japanese game designer and European cinematic culture.

== Legacy ==
Kojima has been noted for his influence on the video game industry. Metal Gear was the first mainstream stealth game, a genre that was later popularized by Metal Gear Solid. Kojima was also a pioneer in the integration of cinematic techniques in video games, especially Metal Gear Solid, which Eurogamer considers the "first modern video game".

Kojima's work has been cited as an influence by numerous game developers, including Splinter Cell and Far Cry 2 designer Clint Hocking, Splinter Cell producer Mathieu Ferland, Silicon Knights founder Denis Dyack, Unreal and Gears of War creator Cliff Bleszinski, Tenchu creator Takuma Endo, Thief creator Tom Leonard, Sumo Digital designer Emily Knox, Crysis 2 animator Luke Kelly, Uncharted writer and The Last of Us creator Neil Druckmann, and 2064: Read Only Memories developer MidBoss. Kojima's work has also been cited as an influence on creators outside of the video game industry, including novelist Project Itoh and filmmaker Jordan Peele.

=== Themes ===
Kojima has been noted for predicting and exploring themes in his works years before they gained mainstream notoriety on numerous occasions, ranging from the sociological to the scientific.

Metal Gear Solid 2: Sons of Liberty was released on November 13, 2001. While the game received universal acclaim upon release for its gameplay and attention to detail, the plot was a divisive topic among critics, with some calling it "absurd" and "stupid". Reinterpretations of the game's plot began to surface in the 2010s, with some calling it "misunderstood" in its time, eerily prescient, and "necessary for the political climate to come" for predicting some of the cultural issues of the 2010s with striking accuracy and similar concepts. GamesRadar+ has cited the prescience of the game in relation to the Facebook–Cambridge Analytica data scandal and the Russian interference in the 2016 United States elections. The concept of "Selection for Societal Sanity" presented in the game was one of the bases for the paper Filtration Failure: On Selection for Societal Sanity written by Adrian Mróz and published in the academic journal Kultura i Historia.

In Metal Gear Solid V: The Phantom Pain, released on September 1, 2015, the Wolbachia bacteria is used to halt the reproduction of the fictional "vocal cord parasites". At the time, large-scale uses of Wolbachia to control insect-transmitted diseases like malaria and dengue only existed in simulated computational models and field-test releases in Australia. Deployment of Wolbachia was proposed the next year at the peak of the Zika epidemic in the Americas. Large-scale deployments of the Wolbachia bacteria became the most effective way to control and eradicate mosquito-related epidemics as of 2019, with successful deployments in Malaysia, Singapore, Sri Lanka, Indonesia, Vietnam, and Brazil.

Kojima's Death Stranding, released on November 8, 2019, presents a post-apocalyptic setting in which people live isolated in cities and prepper shelters, unable to go outside because of the hazardous conditions brought on by an event named the "Death Stranding". The inhabitants of the world rely on "porters", people who risk their lives making deliveries, to receive and exchange the resources they need to survive. Similarities with the COVID-19 pandemic were noted by numerous journalists in early 2020, including the game's focus on the themes of isolation, loneliness, and political divide.

== Personal life ==
Kojima is private about his personal life. He is married and has two sons. His mother died in early 2017.

== Awards and accolades ==
Newsweek named Kojima as one of the top ten people of 2002. In 2008, Next-Gen placed him seventh in their list of "Hot 100 Developers 2008".

In 2009, IGN placed him sixth in their list of top game creators of all time. At the 2008 MTV Game Awards, Kojima was given the award show's first Lifetime Achievement Award for a game designer and was also honored with a Lifetime Achievement Award at the 2009 Game Developers Conference. In 2014, UNESCO's Bradford City of Film gave Kojima the inaugural award for Cinematography in Videogames, "for his astounding directing, storytelling, and cinematography" in video games.

At the 2014 National Academy of Video Game Trade Reviewers (NAVGTR) awards, Kojima was credited for Metal Gear Solid V: Ground Zeroes' nomination for the category Game, Franchise Adventure. In December 2015, Kojima was invited to accept an award from The Game Awards 2015 for Metal Gear Solid V: The Phantom Pain, but was prevented from attending by Konami.

In February 2016, Kojima received the AIAS Hall of Fame Award at the 19th Annual D.I.C.E. Awards. In December 2016, Kojima was able to attend The Game Awards 2016 and accepted the Industry Icon Award.

On October 12, 2017, he received a Lifetime Achievement Award at the Brasil Game Show.

Kojima was named a BAFTA Fellowship at the 2020 British Academy Games Awards, making him the second Japanese person to receive the award for work on video games after Shigeru Miyamoto.

Kojima holds the distinction of having directed four games (Metal Gear Solid 4: Guns of the Patriots, Metal Gear Solid: Peace Walker, Metal Gear Solid V: The Phantom Pain and Death Stranding) out of the 30 total to have achieved a maximum possible score of 40 from the Japanese video games magazine Famitsu. Kojima has also been directly involved with three games (Metal Gear Solid, Metal Gear Solid 4: Guns of the Patriots, and Death Stranding) that were nominated for Game of the Year by the Academy of Interactive Arts & Sciences at the D.I.C.E. Awards.

On January 20, 2022, Kojima received an Industry Legend Award from the Arab Game Awards.

On March 15, 2022, Kojima announced on Twitter that he had received the 72nd Minister of Education Award for Fine Arts from the Japanese Agency of Cultural Affairs.

== Works ==
=== Games ===
Year	Title	Credited as
1986	Penguin Adventure	
1987	Metal Gear	Game designer, writer
1988	Snatcher	Game designer, writer
1990	Metal Gear 2: Solid Snake	Game designer, writer
1990	SD Snatcher	Writer
1994	Policenauts	Director, game designer, writer
1997	Tokimeki Memorial Drama Series Vol. 1	Executive Producer
1998	Tokimeki Memorial Drama Series Vol. 2	Producer
1998	Metal Gear Solid	Director, producer, game designer, writer
1998–2002	Beatmania console ports	Producer
1999	Tokimeki Memorial Drama Series Vol. 3	Supervisor
1999	Guitar Freaks console port	Producer
2000	Guitar Freaks Append 2nd Mix console port	Producer
2000–2002	Beatmania IIDX console ports	Producer
2000	Metal Gear: Ghost Babel	Producer, Supervising director
2001	Zone of the Enders	Producer
2001	Metal Gear Solid 2: Sons of Liberty	Director, producer, game designer, writer
2003	Boktai: The Sun is in Your Hand	Producer, game designer
2003	Zone of the Enders: The 2nd Runner	Planning, Producer
2004	Metal Gear Solid: The Twin Snakes	Producer, Executive Supervisor
2004	Boktai 2: Solar Boy Django	Producer
2004	Metal Gear Solid 3: Snake Eater	Director, producer, game designer, writer
2004	Metal Gear Acid	Executive producer
2005	Shin Bokura no Taiyō: Gyakushū no Sabata	Producer
2005	Metal Gear Acid 2	Producer
2006	Lunar Knights	Producer
2006	Metal Gear Solid: Portable Ops	Producer, General Manager
2006	Kabushiki Baibai Trainer: Kabutore!	Producer
2007	Kabushiki Baibai Trainer: Kabutore! Next	Producer
2008	Super Smash Bros. Brawl	Shadow Moses Island stage designer
2008	Metal Gear Solid Mobile	Supervisor
2008	Metal Gear Solid 4: Guns of the Patriots	Director, producer, game designer, writer
2008	Metal Gear Online	
2008	Twelve Tender Killers	Producer
2009	Gaitame Baibai Trainer: Kabutore! FX	Producer
2009	Metal Gear Solid Touch	Executive producer
2010	Metal Gear Solid: Peace Walker	Director, producer, game designer, writer
2010	Castlevania: Lords of Shadow	Executive producer
2011	Metal Gear Solid HD Collection	Producer
2012	Metal Gear Solid Snake Eater 3D	Producer
2012	Zone of the Enders: HD Collection	Producer
2013	Metal Gear Rising: Revengeance	Supervising director
2014	Metal Gear Solid V: Ground Zeroes	Director, producer, game designer, writer
2014	P.T.	Director, game designer
2015	Metal Gear Solid V: The Phantom Pain	Director, producer, game designer, writer
2019	Death Stranding	Director, producer, game designer, writer
2025	Death Stranding 2: On the Beach	Director, producer, game designer, writer
TBA	OD	Director, producer, game designer, writer
TBA	Physint (working title)	Director, producer, game designer, writer

=== Canceled games ===
Year canceled	Title	Ref
1986	Lost World	
2015	Silent Hills	

=== Films ===
Year	Title	Credited as
TBA	Death Stranding Mosquito (Working Title)	Producer
TBA	Death Stranding (Live action movie)	Producer

=== TV ===
Year	Title	Credited as
2027	Death Stranding: Isolations	Executive Producer

=== Literary works ===
- The Creative Gene: How Books, Movies, and Music Inspired the Creator of Death Stranding and Metal Gear Solid. San Francisco: Viz. 2022. ISBN 978-19-7472-591-5.
- The Gifted Gene and My 70% Movie Body.

=== Actor roles ===
==== Video games ====
Year	Title	Role	Ref.
1994	Policenauts	AP officer no.2 (uncredited)	
1998	Metal Gear Solid	Himself (Japanese version)	
1999	Metal Gear Solid: VR Missions	Genola	
2008	Metal Gear Solid 4: Guns of the Patriots	Voice of God, Missouri crew (Japanese voice)	
2008	Metal Gear Online	Soldiers	
2010	Castlevania: Lords of Shadow	Chupacabra (Japanese voice)	
2010	Metal Gear Solid: Peace Walker	Himself	
2014	Metal Gear Solid V: Ground Zeroes	Himself	
2015	Metal Gear Solid V: The Phantom Pain	Himself	
2019	Death Stranding	B.T. (uncredited)	
2019	Control	Dr. Yoshimi Tokui	
2020	Cyberpunk 2077	Hideyoshi Oshima	

==== Film and TV ====
Year	Title	Role	Ref.
2000	Versus	Extra	
2003	Azumi	Extra	
2017	Ultraman Orb The Movie	Extra	
2019	Too Old to Die Young	Assassin	
2023	Copenhagen Cowboy	Hideo	
2025	Zootopia 2	Paul Molebrandt (Japanese dub)	
2026	Cyberpunk: Edgerunners 2	Hideyoshi Oshima	

==== Other ====
Year	Title	Role	Work
2007	Spy 2.5 Daisakusen	Idea Spy 2.5	Audio drama
2011	Snatcher	Little John	Radio drama
2017	The Eleven Little Roosters	Himself	Web series
