= The Creative Gene =

2021 autobiography by Hideo Kojima

The Creative Gene: How Books, Movies, and Music Inspired the Creator of Death Stranding and Metal Gear Solid
- Author: Hideo Kojima
- Cover artist: Adam Grano
- Language: English; Japanese
- Genre: Autobiographical
- Publisher: Shincho Bunko (Japan); Viz Media (United States)
- Publication date: October 12, 2021
- Publication place: United States; Japan
- Pages: 256
- ISBN: 978-1-974-72591-5

The Creative Gene: How Books, Movies, and Music Inspired the Creator of Death Stranding and Metal Gear Solid is an autobiographical book written by Japanese video game designer Hideo Kojima, published on October 12, 2021, by Viz Media. Based on the collection of essays titled The Gifted Gene and My Lovable Memes which was published in Japan in 2019, the book focuses on Kojima's inspirations on his work from various pop culture media, such as books, movies and music. Exploring themes such as isolationism, loneliness, grief and death, The Creative Gene collocates personal anecdotes of Kojima's life involving his inspirations with his sentiments towards the multitude of works that inspired him. The Creative Gene received positive reviews from critics, with praise given towards Kojima's exploration of his inspirations and their influence on his life.

== Background and development ==
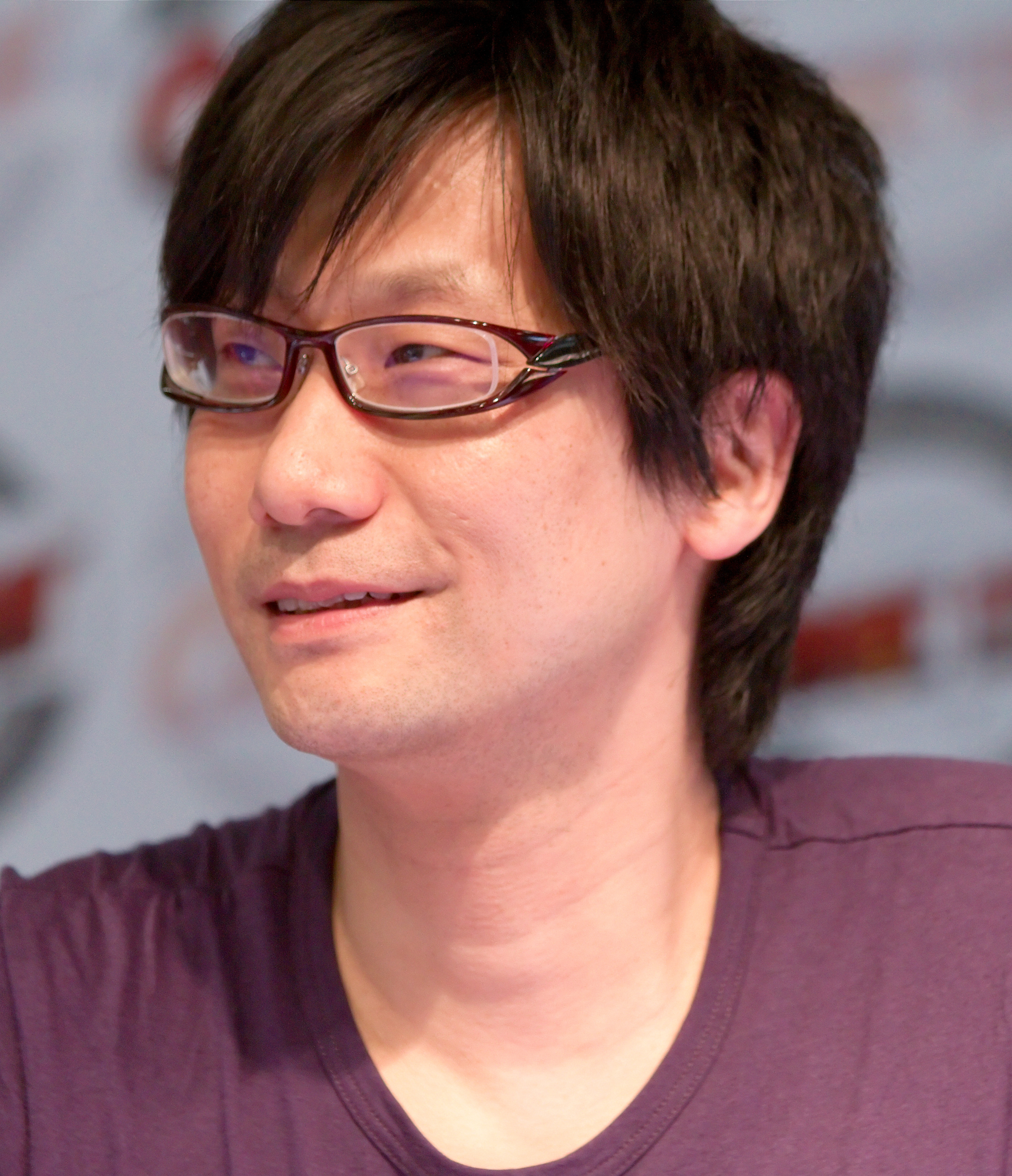
Hideo Kojima at the Japan Expo in 2010

Hideo Kojima is a Japanese video game designer notable for creating the video game series Metal Gear and the games Policenauts, Snatcher and Death Stranding. Appraised as an "auteur" and a prominent figure in the video game industry, Kojima wrote the book The Gifted Gene and My Lovable Memes as a collection of essays detailing his inspirations. Written in Japanese, the book was originally published by Shincho Bunko and released in Japan on October 27, 2019. In February 2021, publisher Viz Media announced that a translated version of the book would be released on October 12, under the title of The Creative Gene: How books, movies, and music inspired the creator of Death Stranding and Metal Gear Solid.

== Premise and content ==
The Creative Gene is an autobiographical book comprising a variety of short stories, essays and anecdotes encompassing Kojima's life, many of which focus on the various pop culture media Kojima developed an adoration for and how they have impacted him. One of the first essays in the book recounts Kojima's affinity for literature originating from his childhood; proclaiming himself as a "latchkey kid", Kojima routinely read books as a child as a way to deal with his father's death, gaining life experience from the lessons he learned from books along with movies. Kojima further elaborates his beliefs on storytelling, stating that "stories allow you to experience places you could never go – the past, the future, or distant worlds. You can become a different ethnicity or gender. Even when you're reading all by yourself, you're sharing those stories as they unfold before you with countless people whom you've never met." Kojima also discusses his routine for visiting bookstores during his free time, conveying that exploring the various works of literature helps him "become better at finding encounters that are meaningful to me, and I further hone my sensibilities."

One notable essay in the book deals with Kojima's adoration of outer space stemming from his childhood. Originally published in 2009, the essay delves into the impact that space has had on Kojima's outlook on humanity and reveals his dream to venture into space someday. In the essay, Kojima expressed that he would be satisfied with orbiting around Earth's atmosphere, along with confessing that he would sacrifice his position as a game designer to pursue his dream. Kojima also avowed his desire to become an astronaut, but relinquished his dream to settle on game design due to the limits of Japan's developing space program during his childhood. Another essay, published in 2011, combines Kojima's review of Hiro Arikawa's 2008 light novel Hankyu Densha with his childhood recollections of the Hankyu Railway. The chapter sees Kojima recalling memories of riding trains on the railway in various moments of his life, including his adulthood where he rode the train again one year before writing the essay. Kojima reflected on the sentimental value of Hankyu Railway, writing that the railway was "not just a means of getting from one place to another, but a time machine connecting my memories to my hometown."

== Themes and style ==
Various publications noted that the book chronicles the connections between Kojima's favorite works of media and his sentiments on events surrounding his life. Through such interwoven reflections, The Creative Gene explores how media consumption frames humanity's perception of the world. Writing for The A.V. Club, Sam Barsanti considered the media discussed in Kojima's essays as tangential subjects that ultimately reflected larger ideas prevalent in his life. Barsanti asserted that the essay on the Japanese anime series Space Battleship Yamato delved into Kojima's relationship with his father. He also noted a similar pattern with the essay on TV shows Bewitched, Little House on the Prairie and anime Shin Chan exploring how the death of his father influenced his values on family. Cameron Kunzelman of Paste magazine stated that the book shows Kojima "constantly reflecting his own experiences with media through what was happening in both his personal life and the broader context of Japanese culture". Discussing him as a creator whose developed aesthetic tastes aided in his ability to direct games, he elaborates that Kojima's inspirations in his work demonstrate the "philosophy of creation, in which the individual person is always a kind of cultural nexus who mixes influences and produces new things". Publications also noted that Kojima eschews overt explanations of his specific creative process and mere summaries of his inspirations in The Creative Gene. Joshua Furr of DualShockers wrote that the book contained few references to the video games he created such as the Metal Gear saga, instead discussing books, films and music that related to his life.

Kunzelman claimed that The Creative Gene addresses topics such as loneliness, death and grief. He wrote that the book contains a "tragic focus" prevailing through many of the stories, arguing that Kojima's propensity to focus on darker works of media "center on his interest in the relationship between people, their societies, and how they deal with massive environmental changes". Annette Polis of Siliconera notes that the book divulges aspects of Kojima's personal life such as coping with his father's death and his conflicts with depression, while Furr noted an essay about the film Taxi Driver (1976) as relating to his experiences with childhood seclusion, with him identifying with character Travis Bickle. Publications also commented on an essay dedicated to Satoshi Itoh about the novelization of Metal Gear Solid 4: Guns of the Patriots (2008) as reflecting themes of death in the book; Itoh, a close friend of Kojima and the novelization's author, succumbed to cancer in 2009 at the age of 34, shortly after the novel's completion. Rich Stanton of PC Gamer related the book's themes of loneliness, regret and isolationism to Death Stranding, also connecting the game with Kojima's essay on Taxi Driver.

Aspects of the book elaborate on themes explored in Kojima's games, such as genes, memes and scenes; all three ideas were explored in the Metal Gear Solid games. Barsanti noted that The Creative Gene extensively focuses on the idea of memes, with Kojima's discussions on the media he enjoys conveying how information influences the upbringing of individuals. Kunzelman referred to Kojima's emphasis on memes as "Dawkinsian", describing Kojima's views on memes as coming from a more individualized standpoint involving the spread of ideas amongst people. Writing for GamesHub, indie game developer Naphtali Faulkner analyzed Kojima's relationships with media in the context of creation, namely how ideas that develop beyond various generations inspire works of art. Faulkner states that through the exploration of media, the book "shows how we can start to think about memes as more than just homage – how we can start to cut away the surface of the things we like, and dig down into the spirit of the ideas that resonate with us".

== Reception ==
The Creative Gene received positive reviews from media outlets, several of whom praised the personal and heartfelt nature of the book. The A.V. Club's Barsanti rated the book an A−, praising Kojima's passionate expressions for his favorite works of art; he opined that the best moments of the book "are glimpses into the mind of a visionary artist who just happens to work in a medium that isn't always known for its capacity for visionary art". Kunzelman commended the book and felt it not only offered insight into Kojima's influences, but also the recurring dark motifs found in his life and oeuvre. Comparing the book to Kojima's affinity for science fiction tragedies, Kunzelman regarded the book as akin to a premonition that offers "a glimpse into a particular kind of human machine", also asserting that "embracing it wholly would put us down the wrong path". Stanton similarly offered praise and minor criticism for the book as well, believing that the book alternates between profundity which would invoke immersion in readers, and moments of self-indulgence that would enable skim reading. Engadget's Jeff Dunn ranked The Creative Gene among his favorite books of 2022, praising the book for both its honesty and its esteem towards art and the creative process.

Several critics noted that The Creative Gene gave them and readers a more profound appreciation for works of fiction as well. Polis found that aspects of her life related to the multitude of media that Kojima enjoyed, observing that they shared a common interest in authors such as Agatha Christie, Miyuki Miyabe and Kazuo Umezz. She also stated that through such similar interests she resonated more with Kojima, propounding that the book was a "fantastic look into the mind of one of gaming's best known designers". Furr expressed that the book demonstrated a strong endearment for media that he had not found elsewhere. Remarking that readers would recognize how particular works of media inspired ideas in Kojima's games, Kunzelman viewed the book as an edifying way to grasp one's influences. Barsanti averred that while readers may not necessarily share the same adoration for Kojima's favorite works of art as him, the book might give readers an ardent admiration for the works of art they personally enjoy.

== See also ==
- The Selfish Gene
