= Shōko Kikuchi =

Japanese voice actress (born 1970)

Shouko Kikuchi
- 菊地祥子
- Born: July 24, 1970 (age 55); Iwate Prefecture, Japan
- Occupation: Voice actress
- Agent: 81 Produce

Shouko Kikuchi (菊地祥子, Kikuchi Shoko; born July 24, 1970 in Iwate Prefecture) is a Japanese voice actress. She is represented by the talent management firm 81 Produce. Kikuchi's hobbies are fishing and fortune-telling, and she can play the ocarina. Her name is sometimes romanized as Syoko Kikuchi.

Kikuchi is famous for voicing Michelle Cheung in R.O.D the TV.

== Filmography ==
Dates for her anime performances are sourced from Anime News Network.

=== Anime television series ===
- R.O.D the TV (2003), Michelle Cheung
- Beast Fighter - The Apocalypse (2003), Maria
- Witch Hunter Robin episode 4 (2002), Sayoko
- Rave Master (2001), Sakura Glory
- Babel II - Beyond Infinity (2001), Yumiko Furumi
- Gear Fighter Dendoh (2000), Miki (C-DRiVE)
- Hand Maid May (2000), Hikari Kōmyoji
- The Kindaichi Case Files episodes 132-135 (2000), Kimiko Inui
- Kaikan Phrase (1999), various roles
- Totsugeki! Pappara-tai (1998), Izumi, Mai
- Cardcaptor Sakura episode 14 (1998), various roles
- Case Closed episode 59 (1997), shopkeeper
- Wankorobee (1996), Shime-chan
- You're Under Arrest (1996), various roles

=== Original video animation (OVA) ===
- Pendant OVA (1997), various roles

=== Anime films ===
- Slayers Great (1997), mother

=== Video games ===
- Whip, The King Of Fighters / KOF
- Sister Princess, Ryōzaki
- Aitakute… ～your smiles in my heart～, Yonmi Hoshino

== Discography ==
- Little Step Image Album (1997, track 6 "Genne Rider")
- Aitakute… Love songs ~a piece of my heart~ (あいたくて… Love songs〜a piece of my heart〜) (2000, track 8 "The Angel Is Obnoxious" (天使がヤカマシイ, Tenshi ga Yakamashii))
