= Atelier Annie: Alchemists of Sera Island =

2009 video game

- North American version cover art
- Developer: Amazing
- Publishers: JP: Gust Co. Ltd.; NA: NIS America
- Series: Atelier
- Platform: Nintendo DS
- Release: JP: March 12, 2009; NA: October 27, 2009
- Genre: Role-playing simulation game
- Mode: Single-player

Atelier Annie: Alchemists of Sera Island (Note: Japanese: アニーのアトリエ ～セラ島の錬金術士～, Hepburn: Anī no Atorie ~Sera Shima no Renkinjutsushi~) is a role-playing video game developed by Japanese developer Amazing for the Nintendo DS.

The game was released in Japan on March 12, 2009 and in North America on October 27, 2009. It is the first to be released in North America to have the gameplay and structure of the "main" Atelier series, having less emphasis on RPG elements and more focus on item creation and resource management.

== Plot ==
Annie was just a simple girl who lived in a town located within the mainland. However, all she did was sleep and fantasize about becoming rich and famous someday by marrying up. Worried about their daughter, her parents consulted Annie's grandfather, a great alchemist, for advice on what to do. After a moment of thought, he decides to send her to Sera Island to take part in a large resort project in order to teach her to overcome her laziness. Thus, in the middle of the night, his homunculi steal Annie away to Sera Island; across land, across river, and across sea.

She gets a rude awakening in the form of a fierce whack to the head and Annie wakes up to meet Pepe, a fairy who gives her a letter from her grandfather and tells her that he'll be the one to instruct her in alchemy, which will be used to facilitate the resort's construction. A disoriented and confused Annie refuses his request until a mysterious man bursts into the room and drags Annie away to a ceremony celebrating the resort project. Later along in the ceremony, the man introduces himself as Hans, the resort supervisor and in extension, Annie's superior, and she also discovers that one of the possible rewards to winning the competition will be marriage to the Prince of Orde along with the title of Meister. True to her dream of marrying up, Annie resolves to become a great alchemist and win the competition.

Along the way, she learns the value of hard work as she manages her own shop and the resort attractions, meets new friends, rivals, and comrades, and through the course of three years, she soon begins to forge her own dream through her newfound strength and will.

== Gameplay ==
Described as role-playing-meets-simulation, the game focuses much more heavily on world building and character interactions rather than battling.

The battle system is made of a basic turn-based combat featuring front-and-back positions that not only affect offense and defense, but change a character's special ability - usually from offensive to supportive, respectively. Enemies have elements assigned to them, which can be exploited through their weaknesses by corresponding colored weapons. Battles occur at random as Annie wanders around gathering materials outside town.

Atelier Annie: Alchemists of Sera Island has an item synthesis system included. Annie can mix items to make new creations from the recipes and integredients. As the game progresses, Annie learns how give items a certain trait, such as fire affinity in the form of being dyed red. They can be used for offense or defense boosts.

Annie owns a shop of her own; the Atelier Annie. Rather than having Annie control the shop, the game lets the player choose a character to take care of it, each with a certain way of managing. While characters are handling a shop, they cannot be put in the party. Each resort facility has a popularity rating which rises every time Annie fulfills a request from the head caretaker of the facility and decreases over time if the player neglects it. For Annie's own shop, she must complete quests offered by the Adventurer's Guild in order to garner attention. A quest usually involves Annie searching for materials, synthesizing a requested item, and turning it in; however, in later quests, the item has specific requirements that the player must fulfill. Every month, an assessment is given on how much each facility had earned in that month. With the money, players can choose to build another resort facility or expand an existing one. The latter cannot take place until the facility has earned enough popularity.

The game takes place over a 3-year period. During that time span, there is an assignment given every 6 months. Finishing an assignment can earn the player development fund to build or expand resorts. There are seven endings in total, determined by the player's actions.

== Characters ==
Annie Eilenberg (アニー・アイレンベルグ, Anī Airenberugu)
Voiced by Ai Nonaka
The 17-year-old protagonist who has the potential to be a good alchemist. Because of her extreme laziness, Annie hopes to avoid hard work by marrying up to become rich and famous. When her parents have finally had it with her attitude, they consult her grandfather Bentner, who ultimately has his homunculi kidnap her away to Sera Island, where she must help with the development of the resort. Eventually, she adjusts to her new life and wholeheartedly strives to do well, though not without Pepe and Hans's constant reminders to keep her on track. There is a bit of a running gag with how often people mistake her to be a pretty boy. She is clueless when it comes to love, and it may be implied that she has a small crush on Hans and doesn't realize it.

Hans Arlens (ハンス・アーレンス, Hansu Ārensu)
Voiced by Noriaki Sugiyama
A 19-year-old man in charge of the resort's construction, he acts as Annie's supervisor. He keeps Annie in check, making sure that she isn't succumbing to her laziness. While he may get exasperated by her many times, Hans trusts Annie to do a good job and comes to her aid when she needs it. Before coming to the island, he graduated from school on the mainland as a valedictorian. Due to his sheltered upbringing, he knows nothing of the world, fashion, or women. Like Annie, Hans has his fair share of people mistaking him to be a pretty girl, but unbeknownst to him, there are a good number of people who admire him just fine as a man within the resort headquarters who give Annie dirty looks once in a while. As Annie spends more time on the island, it is learned that Hans willingly signed up to be a part of the development project's committee due to issues with his father. It is hinted that he is in love with Annie. In one of the endings Hans will object in one of the scenes after the King of Orde asks "Does anyone have an objection against the palace welcoming Annie as the Prince's bride?".

Pepe (ペペ, Pepe)
Voiced by Miyuki Sawashiro
Pepe is a fairy teaching alchemy to Annie at her grandfather's request. He has raised many successful alchemists in the past and is a strict teacher. People who meet him often point out his short height, despite the fact that he is actually one of the tallest fairies at home. Annie has a tendency to steal his snacks behind his back.

Kilbert Hennes (キルベルト・ハネス, Kiruberuto Hanesu)
Voiced by Jūrōta Kosugi
A 23-year-old well-known adventurer from the Adventurer's Guild, he carries around a large sword called Fragarach on his back. Annie meets him while looking for a bodyguard. His goofy personality betrays his fierce look and large stature, as well as the awe inspired by the Kilbert Saga, rumored stories of his past journeys. His father was also a renowned adventurer, having passed Fragarach down to him; however, Kilbert cannot pull the sword out at will and thus resorts to using alternative weapons. He has a stubborn reluctance to visit the weapon shop, seemingly because of a past connection to its owner, Amalie.

Gillian Clout (ジェリア・クラウト, Jeria Kurauto)
Voiced by Kaoru Akiyama
An 18-year-old female member of the Knights of Orde, whose job is to protect the island during the development project. Annie meets her at the Committee HQ while looking for a bodyguard. She is an expert spear wielder, and her ordinary physique strongly contrasts the immense strength she actually possesses. In spite of this, she has a tendency to slack off at work. Because her father was also an extraordinary knight, she seems to receive special treatment from Captain Brookhart. For this reason, she has a hard time getting along with her co-workers. She has a curious obsession with medical herb juices, often mixing whatever she can find into her bottle.

Kyle Eugrald (カイル・ユグラルド, Kairu Yugurarudo)
Voiced by Daisuke Sakaguchi
A 25-year-old mechanic from a foreign land, he came to Sera Island to propagate mechanical development. He comes across as slightly perverted, showing obvious signs of attraction to many of the women he meets. He can also be clumsy, with many of his inventions malfunctioning or exploding. However, he can occasionally show a dependable side, and tries to help people fix things for no obvious benefit of his own. He is handsome enough to be a model, but because of his annoying personality and obsession with machines, few women really like him.

Fitz Erberlin (フィズ・エーベルリン, Fizu Ēberurin)
Voiced by Ema Kogure
An 11-year-old girl who works at Lichterzehn's restaurant, which is owned by her parents. Annie meets her while visiting the restaurant and fixing her family's broken stove. She is harsh and difficult to get along with around everyone but Annie, whom she idolizes and treats like an older sister. Despite this, her customers find her personality cute and charming. She is often at odds with Pepe, who calls her Shorty in spite of his own height.

Beaux Shrick (ビュウ・シュリック, Byū Shurikku)
Voiced by Tetsu Shiratori
A 15-year-old adventurer-in-training with a poor sense of direction. His inability to navigate even the simplest of roads somehow causes him to go from the mainland to the island, where Annie finds him nearly passed out from starvation. He carries with him an old compass, a keepsake from his brother who mysteriously disappeared on an adventure. Because of his brother's disappearance, he often has conflicts with the Adventurer's Guild, who initially wanted his brother to join.

Lisette "Liese" Randel (リゼット・ランデル, Rizetto Randeru)
Voiced by Sakura Nogawa
Formerly the protagonist of Atelier Liese: The Alchemist of Orde, Liese makes her appearance after Annie receives the fourth Alchemy contest information from Hans. She has a great fondness for money, trying to get as much as possible out of anything she can.

== Reception ==
Reception

Aggregate score
Aggregator	Score
Metacritic	70/100

Review scores
Publication	Score
Famitsu	7/10, 7/10, 7/10, 7/10,
Game Informer	5/10
GameSpot	7/10
GameZone	7.4/10
Nintendo Power	8/10
RPGamer	4/5
RPGFan	81/100

The game received "average" reviews according to the review aggregation website Metacritic. In Japan, Famitsu gave it a score of all four sevens for a total of 28 out of 40, over a month before the game was released there.
