= Boktai: The Sun Is in Your Hand =

2003 video game

- European cover art
- Developer: Konami Computer Entertainment Japan
- Publisher: Konami
- Director: Ikuya Nakamura
- Producer: Hideo Kojima
- Writer: Ikuya Nakamura
- Composers: Kazuki Muraoka; Masashi Watanabe; Norihiko Hibino; Shuichi Kobori
- Platform: Game Boy Advance
- Release: JP: July 17, 2003; NA: September 16, 2003; EU: May 14, 2004; AU: May 28, 2004
- Genre: Action role-playing
- Modes: Single-player, multiplayer

Boktai: The Sun Is in Your Hand (Note: Known in Japan as Bokura no Taiyō (Japanese: ボクらの太陽; lit. Our Sun).) is an action-adventure role-playing video game released by Konami for the Game Boy Advance in 2003, and the first game in the Boktai series. The player takes the role of Django, a vampire hunter, who uses a weapon called the "Gun Del Sol" (Solar Gun), that fires bolts of sunlight at enemies. The game made novel use of a light sensor on the cartridge which encouraged playing parts of the game in direct sunlight. The game was produced and designed by Hideo Kojima.

== Plot ==
The game's story takes place in a time period near the end of the world, called the Age of Darkness. The story features the appearance of undead creatures after the natural cycle of life and death was broken. People quickly began dying due to the use and misuse of "Dark Matter", a type of energy that corrupts and destroys life. Those who survived quickly became prey to dark creatures called "Immortals", beings composed of Dark Matter at the cellular level.

The story is set in the city of Istrakan, which had already been overrun by the Immortals. The city was in a hopeless situation as the curse brought the "undeadening" of all, edging the human race closer to extinction. Even the heroes who used to hunt the Immortals have already fallen, and so people's hopes have been shattered.

One day, however, a mysterious boy named Django emerged. He turned out to have the blood of one of the most legendary vampire hunters running in his veins, and was also the heir of the Gun Del Sol. He must go to Istrakan, the City of Death – where many times and places intertwine – in order to prevent the end of the world.

Django's mission to save humanity is reinforced by his desire to avenge his father, Ringo, after his death. He uses sunlight as his weapon throughout his endeavors.

== Gameplay ==
The game's cartridge has a photometric light sensor which measures light exposure. In order to charge the in-game solar weapons, the player must take their Game Boy Advance (GBA) outside in the daytime (as verified by the light sensor). If the player's gun battery runs out of light reserves and there is no sunlight available, then the player must avoid conflicts with enemies or find an in-game "Solar Station" to recharge.

Before a game is started, the player is prompted to set their current time and time zone. The game can then estimate when the Sun will rise and set, and simulates the position of the Sun inside the game. The player has an advantage during the daytime as vampires cannot be exposed to sunlight. Sunlight also affects the world around the main character - an example is a Solar Tree, a tree that is being damaged by the darkness of the Immortals, and can be cured by playing the game in the sunlight. The outdoor game environment also includes bird chirp sound effects in the morning and a soft orange glow around sunset.

Game combat focuses on stealth. An integral concept is shooting an undead in the back, stunning it, then either running away or killing it. Getting caught by a monster, indicated by a red exclamation point above the head, will reduce the grade received at the end of a stage. A number of other factors also determine the grade received, such as total time taken to complete the level. After a number of dungeon levels the player will reach an "Immortal" level where one of four bosses resides. The player will have to fight their way to the boss creature, or Immortal, and defeat it. The boss is then faced again in the sunlight outside of its lair. In this fight, a weapon called the "Pile Driver" must be charged by the player exposing the game to sunlight. The greater the amount of sunlight, the more damage the Pile Driver will inflict upon the Immortal during the fight.

== Reception ==
Reception

Aggregate score
Aggregator	Score
Metacritic	83/100

Review scores
Publication	Score
Edge	8/10
Electronic Gaming Monthly	8.5/10
Famitsu	36/40
Game Informer	5/10
GamePro	5/5
GameSpot	8.3/10
GameSpy	3/5
IGN	8.5/10
Nintendo Power	4.4/5
X-Play	3/5
Entertainment Weekly	A

The game received "favorable" reviews according to the review aggregation website Metacritic. In Japan, Famitsu gave it a total score of 36 out of 40.

== Sequels ==
Boktai was followed by two sequels on the Game Boy Advance: Boktai 2: Solar Boy Django and Shin Bokura no Taiyō: Gyakushū no Sabata (also known as Boktai 3: Sabata's Counterattack). The latter was released exclusively in Japan. Both GBA sequels employed the use of a solar sensor on their cartridges. A fourth game was released for the Nintendo DS titled Bokura no Taiyō: Django & Sabata, released outside Japan under the title Lunar Knights. The name change was an attempt to rebrand the series after the fourth game abandoned the use of a solar sensor (due to the Nintendo DS using cards instead of cartridges).

=== Other media ===
A manga was produced called Solar Boy Django. It was produced by Makoto Hijioka and was loosely based on the Boktai storyline. It was written by Makoto Hijioka and published in Shogakukan's CoroCoro Comic from September 2003 to July 2007. It does not follow the plot of the games directly, although it does include many of the characters, such as the Count and Sabata. An English version of the manga has been made available from a Singapore manga production company. In 2007, Elex Media Komputindo licensed the manga for the Indonesian market with the title Jango the Solar Boy.

Django and Otenko appeared in Mega Man Battle Network 4.
