= Lunar Knights =

2006 video game

- Developer: Kojima Productions
- Publisher: Konami
- Director: Ikuya Nakamura
- Producers: Hideo Kojima; Kensuke Yoshitomi
- Writers: Ikuya Nakamura; Ryosaku Ueno
- Platform: Nintendo DS
- Release: JP: 22 November 2006; NA: 6 February 2007; EU: 30 March 2007; AU: 13 April 2007
- Genre: Action role-playing
- Modes: Single-player, multiplayer

Lunar Knights, known in Japan as Bokura no Taiyō: Django & Sabata (ボクらの太陽 Django & Sabata; "Our Sun: Django & Sabata") and abbreviated Boktai DS, is an action role-playing video game and the fourth title in the Boktai series of video games developed by Kojima Productions.

The game was revamped to remove the necessity of using the real-life solar sensor due to player troubles, but it still retains the functionality if any of the Game Boy Advance Boktai cartridges are inserted.

As some gameplay features are exclusive to Japan, the original names of the characters are used in such instances.

== Gameplay ==
Lunar Knights revolves around two characters: Lucian and Aaron. Lucian is a vampire hunter, wielding various dark melee weapons. He is also imbued with the power of darkness, and can change into a vampire after he builds up a Trance (shortened to TRC in-game) meter by fusing with his Terrennial, Nero, which allows him to absorb life out of his foes. Aaron is an apprentice sharpshooter, and uses a variety of Solar Guns to deal damage to his undead foes. Unlike Lucian, Aaron has light powers, and can temporarily become an avatar of the sun when needed by fusing with his Terrennial, Toasty. The player increases the two characters' levels by killing enemies, and their weapons may be upgraded with various parts, allowing more abilities to be used with that weapon.

The ultimate goal in Lunar Knights is to destroy a number of boss vampire enemies, in which the basic mission is to defeat each of them in their respective dungeons, either by exploiting their elemental weakness or using Trance. Once this is accomplished, the boss is launched into space using the Casket Rocket, Laplace; the player then enters a minigame consisting of three parts. The Casket Rocket is controlled from a third-person perspective with the stylus. By moving the stylus, Laplace moves, and tapping the screen causes it to fire lasers. After these three segments have ended, there is a short video segment in which the defeated boss is purified with the intense solar radiation in the stratosphere, made possible by the Interstellar Satellite Sunflower.

As more bosses are defeated, the player is able to gain access to different elements through terrennials. There are four different terrennials available besides Nero (Dark) and Toasty (Sol): Ursula (Flame), Tove (Earth), Alexander (Cloud), and Ezra (Frost). With each acquired terrennial comes a different climate for the player to manipulate. This can be done by going to Sheridan's Mansion and selecting 'Change Climate' to change the default weather. Certain parts of dungeons, which often hold new items and weapons, are inaccessible unless the player changes the weather. Special high-priced items are dropped by enemies or objects under certain climate conditions.

The game relies on an in-game weather control system, known as the paraSOL. It has a thermometer, and measures humidity and wind speed. The weather is generated from the game itself, not from the local outside environment. There are five types of weather: balmy subtropical, tropical rainforest, humid continental, arid desert and frigid arctic.

The Trance meter is built up as the player lands blows on their enemies. When it is full, the player can use the powers of one of their Terrennials to launch into an extra powerful attack that affects multiple enemies. The transformations mentioned above are two of these attacks, but some are more magical in orientation, and often revolve around interaction with the touch screen.

Burst attacks are Trance moves performed by terrennials other than Toasty and Nero. When a Burst attack is used, the weather will change accordingly. Terrennials are the physical manefestiations of the elements that accompany the characters, with fire, ice, wind, and earth represented. In addition, the sun has a terrennial as does darkness. Furthermore, there is a null-elemental Terrenial only available in the Japanese version - War Rock, whose details are described below in the Crossover section. When these terrennials are equipped, the player can use TRC powers, and they will add their elemental attacks to weapon strikes, at the cost of some energy. Each element is directly vulnerable to its polar opposite, and resistant to itself. For example, if the player strikes an ice-aligned monster with fire equipped, extra damage will be dealt, but if ice is equipped, less than normal damage will be dealt.

=== W-Gate slot ===
The player is able to use the Game Boy Advance Boktai games' Sun sensor to play Lunar Knights like the original Boktai games. This option gives the player more of an advantage: slotting a GBA game into the DS' W-Gate allows the player to use extra sunlight by adding the detected sun strength to the amount produced by the in-game weather system (the extra sunlight appear as green blocks in the game's sensor bar) for a certain amount of time. It also enables the player to play in sunlight regardless of the in-game world's weather.

Depending on which game is introduced into the W-Gate, the Solar Sensor will cause different effects in Lunar Knights:

- Solar Sensor Version 1: By inserting Boktai: The Sun Is in Your Hand in the GBA Slot, the standby character will fill his ENE (Energy).
- Solar Sensor Version 2: By inserting Boktai 2: Solar Boy Django in the GBA Slot, the standby character will fill his LIFE.
- Solar Sensor Version 3: By inserting Shin Bokura no Taiyō: Gyakushū no Sabata in the GBA Slot, the standby character will fill his TRC (Trance) meter.

Regardless of the game inserted, the Solar Station will also be charged depending on how much sunlight hits the sensor.

Blowing into the Nintendo DS's microphone will cause the character to whistle, drawing attention to enemies. This serves to replace the wall tapping of earlier games in the Boktai series. Whistling also has the function of using a terrennial's special technique, which can only be used when the terrennial is glowing; this happens during affiliated climate or time of day.

=== Crossover content ===
Boktai DS, the Japanese version of Lunar Knights, continued the crossover-promotion the series had with Capcom's Mega Man franchise since Boktai 2. Django and Sabata fight Ox Fire, one of the enemy FM-ians from the original Mega Man Star Force, as a hidden boss. If they are successful in defeating him, War Rock can assist them as a seventh terrennial. Players can also obtain exclusive items by transferring game data from Star Force into Boktai DS. Similarly, content from Boktai DS can be transferred to and unlocked in Star Force; while this content was removed from the English release, it was restored and translated for the game's re-release in Mega Man Star Force Legacy Collection.

== Setting ==
Lunar Knights producer Kensuke Yoshitomi confirmed in a 1Up.com interview that the game takes place in the same world as Boktai, but at a different time period with new characters, and is not a direct sequel to Boktai. He stated that the many versions of Princess Zelda and Link throughout The Legend of Zelda series are a good representation of this.

== Plot ==
The game begins with two men talking about the nearby vampire's ability to control flame. Lucian, the Lunar Knight overhears them, and sets out to obtain the whereabouts of the Duke, the leader of the Dark Tribe vampires. Later in the level, Lucian encounters Bea, a solar gunslinger attempting to free the prisoners of the mansion. Lucian realizes the strength of the vampire, and must upgrade his weapon by taking it to Professor Sheridan. After a confusing moment with the Professor's maid, Lucian barges his way in.

Returning to the Mansion, Lucian refuses to help Bea free the prisoners, claiming they would not even try to fight back against enemies. Lucian blocks a bolt from the vampire meant for Bea. After defeating and purifying the vampire, he obtains the power of the flame terrenial Ursula. He also discovers that to reach the Duke, he must collect the other three main terrenials.

The guild is attacked and Aaron, the Solar Knight, is told to warn the other members. When he escapes, Aaron sees a girl on an opposite rooftop being chased by undead. Aaron fires his gun and destroys the undead. Aaron obtains the power of Toasty, the Solar Terrenial. Later on, two vampires known as the Poes attack Aaron, but Ernest, the Leader of the Guild, and Kay, his apprentice, distract them and Aaron must gather the last of the members. Aaron fights the Goat Chimera and Bea appears to assist Ernest and Kay.

Aaron is worried about Ernest and Kay. Bea reappears and tells them the vampires are hiding in the sewer. Bea calls Lucian, and while Lucian refuses to let Aaron come along, Bea ignores him. When they arrive at the end, The Poes reveal that they have packed the gunslingers on a train for the vampire tower. After defeating and purifying the Poes, Lucian and Aaron obtain Alexander and Tove, terrenials of Wind and Earth. They must now infiltrate the train station. Arriving near the end, Kay reveals that Ernest distracted the guards. Lucian finds the Duke and attacks him, but he teleports away. The player boards the train and begins to make their way across the train. On the way across, a pink orb flies by the player, and a conversation with the mystery immortal known as Polidori begins with Stoker. The player defeats and purifies the vampire known as Baron Stoker.

Lucian and Aaron fight their way into the city, and eventually reach the Dark Castle. Before entering, Polidori appears to them, explaining he is an emissary from space on behalf of the immortals. Lucian and Aaron travel through the castle, and discover that the enemy pilot they encounter in space during purification levels is Perrault, Nero's other half. The terennials question their goals and wonder if their battle is right, eventually deciding that the humans are smart enough to save their world, the duo find themselves in the throne room. After defeating the Duke, Polidori absorbs him, informing the duo that the ParaSol was really the Planet Eater, a planet-destroying weapon.

Lucian and Aaron make their way through the Planet Eater up to Polidori. After beating him, Polidori flees into space, where in a 4-Part battle, he is destroyed. Perrault rescues Lucian and Aaron and the credits roll.

There is a postgame bonus level named Vamberry, a 100 floor tower. At the end of it, Lucian and Aaron defeat the resurrected Polidori. During the levels, the two discover that Dumas has also been remade by Perrault. Polidori's aims are questioned by Lucian, who accuses him of being only a copy of the real Polidori. He states that he understands the aims of the real immortal. The Knights defeat Polidori, and Dumas appears to tell them that the Immortals will arrive to stop the renegade Earth. He tells them that Humans and Vampires may have to become allies. Dumas leaves, and Lucian declares he will never work with Vampires, even against the immortals. The scene ends with Aaron unsure Lucian will hold to that promise.

== Reception ==
Reception

Aggregate score
Aggregator	Score
Metacritic	82/100

Review scores
Publication	Score
Edge	7/10
Electronic Gaming Monthly	8/10 (Note: Three critics of Electronic Gaming Monthly gave the game each a score of 9/10, 7/10, and 8/10.)
Eurogamer	7/10
Famitsu	32/40
Game Informer	8/10
GamePro	4/5
GameRevolution	B+
GameSpot	8.4/10
GameSpy	4.5/5
GameZone	8.4/10
IGN	8.2/10
Nintendo Power	8/10
Pocket Gamer	4.5/5
411Mania	6.5/10
Anime News Network	C+

The game received "favorable" reviews according to the review aggregation website Metacritic. In Japan, Famitsu gave it a score of one nine, one eight, one seven, and one eight for a total of 32 out of 40.
