= Boktai 2: Solar Boy Django =

2004 video game

- European box art
- Developer: Konami Computer Entertainment Japan
- Publisher: Konami
- Director: Ikuya Nakamura
- Producer: Hideo Kojima
- Artist: Juntaro Saito
- Writer: Ikuya Nakamura
- Composers: Norihiko Hibino; Shuichi Kobori; Masashi Watanabe; Kazuki Muraoka; Akihiro Honda; Waichiro Ozaki; Nobuko Toda
- Platform: Game Boy Advance
- Release: JP: July 22, 2004; NA: October 19, 2004; EU: June 10, 2005
- Genre: Action role-playing
- Modes: Single-player, multiplayer

Boktai 2: Solar Boy Django, (Note: Known in Japan as Zoku Bokura no Taiyō Taiyō Shōnen Jango (Japanese: 続・ボクらの太陽 太陽少年ジャンゴ; lit. Our Sun 2: Solar Boy Django).) also known as Zoktai (Note: A portmanteau of Zoku (Japanese: 続; lit. sequel) and Boktai) , is a video game that was developed and published by Konami for the Game Boy Advance. Released in North America and Japan in 2004 and in Europe in 2005, it is the sequel to Boktai: The Sun Is in Your Hand.

Boktai 2's game cartridge includes a photometric light sensor that measures the amount of sunlight/UV rays exposed to it.

== Plot ==
The game takes place in San Miguel, Django's home town. As Django arrives he is confronted by a mysterious vampire who steals the Gun Del Sol (Solar Gun) and somehow uses it on Django. Unarmed, he makes his way through the dungeon and is greeted by Zazie the Sunflower girl. She bestows upon him the Sol de Vice (Solar Glove), which gives Django the ability to enchant ordinary weapons, like a sword, with the power of the sun.

He arrives at what is left of San Miguel. Upon arriving he finds out that the vampire who stole the Gun Del Sol has been through here. He hears that Smith, the town blacksmith, is missing. He decides to go find Smith in hope of finding out something about the vampire. He is told by Zazie that she saw Smith head towards the cathedral. Django decides that was the best place to start looking for him. The story evolves from here into something much larger.

Towards the end of the game, Django will regain his Solar Gun, but it will be greatly damaged due to the use of it by the vampire, who turns out to be Django's father, Ringo. Although the character known as Smith will repair it, it is unable to be restored to its original functionality.

If the player chooses to continue their game after beating the game, he or she will start off from where the game was last saved, rather than how the continue function worked in Boktai 1, where the player needed to restart the game. There are four different endings that are somewhat the same, other than the characters who are talking with Django, who basically talk about dark and light needing to be together in order for both to co-exist, and who, exactly, helped Django during the final battle. The characters include Earthly Maiden Lita, Dark Boy Sabata, the librarian named Lady, and Smith's granddaughter named Violet (Sumire in Japan).

The paths to each ending is dependent on the number of times the player has defeated the final boss, the Doomsday Beast Jormungandr. After defeat him the first time, the player will talk with Zazie. After Jormungandr's first defeat, the player cannot fight him again until the Megaman (Rockman) side-quest has been completed with Shademan. When that's completed and Jormungandr is defeated again, the player will talk to Violet again. When Jormungandr is defeated for the third time, the player will get to talk to Sabata. Defeat Jormungandr again, and the player will talk with Lady. One last time, and the player will talk with Lita. The cycle then repeats itself when defeating Jormungandr.

There are a total of two bad endings. The first bad ending is in the Spiral Tower while Django and Sabata are talking to the Black Dainn. Dainn will tell Django to become their "Dark Sun", and a choice will be appear reading "Join Black Dainn" or "Refuse!!" Choosing to "Join Black Dainn" will result in a short cut scene and then the credits. The second bad ending takes place after fighting the Ancestor Piece Jormungandr. If the player fails to solar charge enough energy within the ten second time limit, Jormungandr will swallow Django and the player will fail to seal the Doomsday Beast.

There are a number of new characters added in this installment of the series. Kid, who runs the potion/armour shop, is met at a certain point in that game. Lady runs the library, serves as a guild master, and is also a tarot master. Cheyenne the Wind Warrior runs the weapon shop once the player defeats him in combat. A grim man runs a coffin shop with many specialty coffins. Also, Solid Snake (from the Metal Gear series) makes a cameo as ???.

Older characters such as Master Otenko, Sabata, and Lita (who happens to run the item shop) return as well, but Lita's function has changed somewhat; in addition to tending the solar tree, she now sells fruit, eliminating the need to grow them like in the first game. Her prices depend on how much solar energy was collected the previous day.

== Gameplay ==
Boktai 2's gameplay is largely identical to that of the original, consisting of a series of stealth- and puzzle-oriented dungeons ending in boss battles against vampires with role-playing game elements. Additions include new weapons, the ability to forge weapons, a money system, and various subtle alterations. The sunlight is no longer used just for energy, but also as a form of currency called SOLL, which is good all over San Miguel. As the player plays the game in daylight, the player builds Solar Energy, or SOL, in the solar stations scattered throughout the in-game world. By converting SOL to SOLL via the local bank (where SOLL is stored and can gain interest) with a 1 SOL=1 SOLL conversion rate, energy can be turned into cash. This cash can be used to buy weapons or other various items. SOLL is also used to purchase a life when the player dies and wishes to continue. The player can get SOLL by selling unneeded items. SOLL can also be converted back to SOL when needed, so one can get energy, make it cash, buy things, and convert leftover SOLL to SOL.

Unlike in the first game, the player does not start over from the beginning of the game after finishing it. The player resumes the file in the last area. Like the first game, this one has a minigame that can be unlocked by completing the game twice. The player can gain access to this minigame by talking to Nero the cat (Kuro in the original Japanese version) or completing the game an even number of times. Prizes for high scores include photos and healing items.

Boktai featured a level named the "Azure Sky Tower" which presented a formidable challenge to players who have completed the game or were highly skilled. Boktai 2's equivalent is named Dream Avenue. Progress through the level yields Tarot cards, Bearnuts, Sunny Clogs and more. Completing the Avenue nets the player a prize, with quality of the prize based upon the difficulty of the challenge. There is also a Battle Arena to test the player's skills in a boss rush-type mode. There are four difficulty levels to the arena: Bronze, Silver, Gold, and Platinum. The player gets a special item for completing each difficulty level, usually an accessible photograph of one of the game's main characters.

The player has access to various missions from different characters after Lady returns to the library. There are four levels and three missions for each area. The player will be awarded for completing each mission. The player will get a tarot card or armor upon completing the first. This game also features both new and old enemies. Some enemies include crows, centipede, bandits, grave keepers, hellhounds, bees, bats, spiders, serpents, skeletons, mummies, and liches. There are also crimson enemies. Crimson enemies appear after killing the hundredth enemy of the same kind. Crimson enemies drop rare items and give many EXP (experience points), but have much more Life and Attack.

This game contains a new feature called solar forging, available after the player has completed the cathedral stage and rescued Smith. With Solar Forging, any two weapon can be combined into one. Two weapons of the same name will produce another of the same name, which is useful for creating SP weapons later on in the game. (i.e. blood sword and blood sword = blood sword SP (when done properly), long sword and long sword = long sword SP). A combination of two weapons of the same type will give another weapon of that type, while weapons of two different types will yield one of the third types (for example, a sword with a sword will always give combined into a sword and a sword with a spear will always be combined into a hammer).

== Reception ==
Reception

Aggregate score
Aggregator	Score
Metacritic	78/100

Review scores
Publication	Score
1Up.com	B
Electronic Gaming Monthly	7.5/10
Famitsu	32/40
Game Informer	6.25/10
GamePro	4.5/5
GameSpot	8/10
GameZone	7/10
IGN	8/10
Nintendo Power	3.9/5
X-Play	4/5
Detroit Free Press	2/4

The game received "generally favorable reviews" according to the review aggregation website Metacritic. In Japan, Famitsu gave it a score of one eight, one seven, one nine, and one eight for a total of 32 out of 40.
