= List of video game remakes and remasters =

This is a list of video game remakes and remasters and includes remakes as well as remasters of video games. It does not include clones and enhanced ports.

== List ==
Platform legend

| 3DS | Nintendo 3DS |
| C64 | Commodore 64 |
| C128 | Commodore 128 |
| CPC | Amstrad CPC |
| DS | Nintendo DS |
| GB | Game Boy |
| GC | GameCube |
| GBA | Game Boy Advance |
| GBC | Game Boy Color |
| Genesis | Sega Genesis/Mega Drive |
| N64 | Nintendo 64 |
| NES | Nintendo Entertainment System |
| PS1 | PlayStation |
| PCW | Amstrad PCW |

| PS2 | PlayStation 2 |
| PS3 | PlayStation 3 |
| PS4 | PlayStation 4 |
| PS5 | PlayStation 5 |
| PSP | PlayStation Portable |
| PSV | PlayStation Vita |
| PSVR | PlayStation VR |
| Saturn | Sega Saturn |
| SNES | Super Nintendo Entertainment System |
| Stadia | Google Stadia |
| Switch | Nintendo Switch |
| Switch 2 | Nintendo Switch 2 |
| Windows | Microsoft Windows |

| Original | | | Remake / remaster | | | | Ref(s) |
| Title | Release year | Platform(s) | Title | Release year | Platform(s) | Type | Ref(s) |
|---|---|---|---|---|---|---|---|
| 1942 | 1984 | Arcade | 1942: Joint Strike | 2008 | Xbox 360, PS3 | Remake | |
| Ace Combat 2 | 1997 | PS1 | Ace Combat: Assault Horizon Legacy | 2011 | 3DS | Remake | |
| ActRaiser | 1990 | SNES | ActRaiser: Renaissance | 2021 | Switch, PS4, Windows, iOS, Android | Remake | |
| Advance Wars | 2001 | GBA | Advance Wars 1+2: Re-Boot Camp | 2023 | Switch | Remakes | |
| Advance Wars 2: Black Hole Rising | 2003 | GBA | Advance Wars 1+2: Re-Boot Camp | 2023 | Switch | Remakes | |
| Age of Empires | 1997 | Windows, Mac OS | Age of Empires: Definitive Edition | 2018 | Windows | Remaster | |
| Age of Empires II | 1999 | Windows, Mac OS | Age of Empires II: HD Edition | 2013 | Windows | Remaster | |
| Age of Empires II | 1999 | Windows, Mac OS | Age of Empires II: Definitive Edition | 2019 | Windows | Remaster | |
| Age of Mythology | 2002 | Windows, Mac OS | Age of Mythology: Extended Edition | 2014 | Windows | Remaster | |
| Age of Empires III | 2005 | Windows, Mac OS | Age of Empires III: Definitive Edition | 2020 | Windows | Remaster | |
| Alan Wake | 2010 | Xbox 360, Windows | Alan Wake Remastered | 2021 | Windows, Switch, Xbox One, Xbox Series X/S, PS4, PS5 | Remaster | |
| Alex Kidd in Miracle World | 1987 | Master System | Alex Kidd in Miracle World DX | 2021 | Windows, Switch, Xbox One, Xbox Series X/S, PS4, PS5 | Remake | |
| Alien Hominid | 2004 | GC, PS2, Xbox | Alien Hominid HD | 2023 | Windows, Xbox One, Nintendo Switch, Xbox Series X/S | Remaster | |
| Alien Hominid | 2004 | GC, PS2, Xbox | Alien Hominid 360 | 2007 | Xbox 360 | Remaster | |
| Alien Syndrome | 1987 | Arcade | Sega Ages 2500 Vol. 14: Alien Syndrome | 2004 | PS2 | Remake | |
| Ankh: The Tales of Mystery | 1998 | Acorn Archimedes | Ankh | 2005 | Windows, Mac OS X, Linux | Remake | |
| Another World | 1991 | Amiga, Atari ST | Another World – 20th Anniversary Edition | 2011 | Android, iOS, Windows, 3DS, Switch, PS3, PS4, PSV, Wii U, Xbox One | Remaster | |
| Apollo Justice: Ace Attorney | 2007 | DS, iOS, Android, 3DS | Apollo Justice: Ace Attorney Trilogy | 2024 | Switch, PS4, Windows, Xbox One | Remasters | |
| Phoenix Wright: Ace Attorney – Dual Destinies | 2013 | 3DS, iOS, Android | Apollo Justice: Ace Attorney Trilogy | 2024 | Switch, PS4, Windows, Xbox One | Remasters | |
| Phoenix Wright: Ace Attorney – Spirit of Justice | 2016 | 3DS, iOS, Android | Apollo Justice: Ace Attorney Trilogy | 2024 | Switch, PS4, Windows, Xbox One | Remasters | |
| Archon: The Light and the Dark | 1983 | Atari 8-bit, Apple II, C64, Amiga, MS-DOS, Macintosh, NES, CPC, ZX Spectrum, PC-88 | Archon Classic | 2010 | Windows | Remake | |
| Arkanoid | 1986 | Arcade, NES, ZX Spectrum, Amstrad CPC 464, C64, BBC Micro, MSX, Atari 8-bit, Apple II, Amiga, Atari ST | Arkanoid Live! | 2009 | Xbox 360, Dreamcast, Macintosh, Windows, PS1 | Remake | |
| Assassin's Creed II | 2009 | PS3, Xbox 360, Windows, Mac OS X | Assassin's Creed: The Ezio Collection | 2018 | PS4, Xbox One | Remasters | |
| Assassin's Creed: Brotherhood | 2010 | PS3, Xbox 360, Windows, Mac OS X | Assassin's Creed: The Ezio Collection | 2018 | PS4, Xbox One | Remasters | |
| Assassin's Creed: Revelations | 2011 | PS3, Xbox 360, Windows | Assassin's Creed: The Ezio Collection | 2018 | PS4, Xbox One | Remasters | |
| Assassin's Creed III | 2012 | PS3, Xbox 360, Wii U, Windows | Assassin's Creed III Remastered | 2019 | Windows, PS4, Xbox One, Switch | Remaster | |
| Assassin's Creed III: Liberation | 2012 | PSV | Assassin's Creed: Liberation HD | 2014 | PS3, Xbox 360, Windows | Remaster | |
| Assassin's Creed III: Liberation | 2012 | PSV | Assassin's Creed III: Liberation Remastered | 2019 | Windows, PS4, Xbox One, Switch | Remaster | |
| Assassin's Creed IV: Black Flag | 2013 | PS3, PS4, Windows, Xbox 360, Xbox One, Wii U, Switch | Assassin's Creed Black Flag Resynced | 2026 | PS5, Windows, Xbox Series X/S | Remake | |
| Assassin's Creed Rogue | 2014 | PS3, Xbox 360, Windows | Assassin's Creed Rogue Remastered | 2018 | PS4, Xbox One, Switch | Remaster | |
| Assault Suit Leynos | 1990 | Genesis | Assault Suit Leynos | 2015 | PS4, Windows | Remake | |
| Asterix & Obelix XXL | 2003 | PS2, GC, Windows | Asterix & Obelix XXL Romastered | 2020 | PS4, Xbox one, Switch, Windows, macOS, PS5 | Remaster | |
| Asterix & Obelix XXL 2: Mission: Las Vegum | 2006 | Windows, PS2, PSP | Asterix & Obelix XXL 2 | 2018 | PS4, Xbox One, Switch, Windows, macOS, PS5 | Remaster | |
| Bad Mojo | 1996 | Mac OS, Windows | Bad Mojo Redux | 2004 | Mac OS X, Windows | Remaster | |
| Baldur's Gate | 1998 | Windows, Mac OS, Linux | Baldur's Gate: Enhanced Edition | 2012 | Windows, Mac OS X, iOS, Android, Linux | Remaster | |
| Baldur's Gate II: Shadows of Amn | 2000 | Windows, Mac OS, Linux | Baldur's Gate II: Enhanced Edition | 2013 | Windows, Mac OS X, iOS, Android, Linux | Remaster | |
| Balloon Fight | 1985 | MZ-1500, NES, PC-88, Sharp X1 | Tingle's Balloon Fight | 2007 | DS | Remake | |
| Banjo-Kazooie | 1998 | N64 | Banjo-Kazooie | 2008 | Xbox 360 | Remaster | |
| Banjo-Tooie | 2000 | N64 | Banjo-Tooie | 2009 | Xbox 360 | Remaster | |
| Banshee's Last Cry | 1994 | SNES | Kamaitachi no Yoru: Rinne Saisei | 2017 | PSV, Windows | Remake | |
| The Bard's Tale | 1985 | Amiga, CPC, Apple II, Apple IIGS, Atari ST, C64, Macintosh, MS-DOS, NES, PC-98, ZX Spectrum | The Bard's Tale Trilogy | 2018 | Windows, Xbox One | Remasters | |
| The Bard's Tale II: The Destiny Knight | 1986 | Amiga, Apple II, Apple IIGS, C64, MS-DOS, NES, PC-98 | The Bard's Tale Trilogy | 2018 | Windows, Xbox One | Remasters | |
| The Bard's Tale III: Thief of Fate | 1988 | Amiga, Apple II, C64, MS-DOS, PC-98 | The Bard's Tale Trilogy | 2018 | Windows, Xbox One | Remasters | |
| Battletoads | 1991 | NES | Battletoads | 2020 | Windows, Xbox One | Remake | |
| Batman: Arkham Asylum | 2009 | Windows, OS X, PS3, Xbox 360 | Batman: Return to Arkham | 2016 | PS4, Xbox One | Remasters | |
| Batman: Arkham City | 2011 | Windows, OS X, PS3, Wii U, Xbox 360 | Batman: Return to Arkham | 2016 | PS4, Xbox One | Remasters | |
| Battlezone | 1998 | Windows | Battlezone 98 Redux | 2016 | Windows | Remaster | |
| Beyond Good & Evil | 2003 | Xbox, PS2, Windows, GC | Beyond Good & Evil HD | 2011 | PS3, Xbox 360 | Remaster | |
| The Binding of Isaac | 2011 | Windows, Mac OS, Linux | The Binding of Isaac: Rebirth | 2014 | Windows, Mac OS, Linux, PS4, PSV, New Nintendo 3DS, Wii U, Xbox One, iOS, Switch, PS5, Xbox Series X/S | Remake | |
| Bionic Commando | 1988 | NES | Bionic Commando Rearmed | 2008 | Xbox 360, PS3, Windows | Remake | |
| BioShock | 2007 | Windows, Xbox 360, PS3, macOS, iOS | BioShock Remastered | 2016 | Windows, PS4, Xbox One, macOS, Switch | Remasters | |
| BioShock 2 | 2010 | Windows, Xbox 360, PS3, macOS | BioShock 2 Remastered | 2016 | Windows, PS4, Xbox One, macOS, Switch | Remasters | |
| Black Belt | 1986 | Master System | Sega Ages 2500 Vol. 11: Hokuto no Ken | 2004 | PS2 | Remake | |
| Blade Runner | 1997 | Windows | Blade Runner Enhanced Edition | 2022 | Windows, Switch, PS4, Xbox One | Remaster | |
| Blood | 1997 | MS-DOS | Blood: Fresh Supply | 2019 | Windows | Remaster | |
| Braid | 2008 | Linux,Mac OS X, Windows, PS3, Xbox 360 | Braid Anniversary Edition | 2024 | Linux, MacOS, Windows, Switch, PS4, PS5, Xbox One, Xbox Series X/S | Remaster | |
| Broken Sword: The Shadow of the Templars | 1996 | Windows, Mac OS, PS1 | Broken Sword: Shadow of the Templars – The Director's Cut | 2009 | DS, Wii, iOS, Windows, Mac OS X, Android, Linux | Remake | |
| Broken Sword II: The Smoking Mirror | 1997 | Windows, PS1 | Broken Sword II: The Smoking Mirror – Remastered | 2010 | Windows, OS, iOS, Android | Remaster | |
| Bubble Bobble | 1986 | Arcade | Bubble Bobble: Old and New | 2003 | Game Boy Advance | Remake | |
| Bully | 2006 | PS2 | Bully: Scholarship Edition | 2008 | Xbox 360, Wii, Windows | Remaster | |
| Bully | 2006 | PS2 | Bully: Anniversary Edition | 2016 | Android, iOS | Remaster | |
| Burnout Paradise | 2008 | PS3, Xbox 360, Windows | Burnout Paradise Remastered | 2018 | PS4, Xbox One, Windows, Switch | Remaster | |
| Call of Duty 4: Modern Warfare | 2007 | Windows, OS X, PS3, Xbox 360, Wii | Call of Duty: Modern Warfare Remastered | 2016 | Xbox One, PS4, Windows | Remaster | |
| Call of Duty: Modern Warfare 2 | 2009 | Windows, OS X, PS3, Xbox 360 | Call of Duty: Modern Warfare 2 Campaign Remastered | 2020 | PS4, Windows, Xbox One | Remaster | |
| Castlevania | 1986 | Famicom Disk System | Castlevania Chronicles | 1993 | X68000, PS1 | Remake | |
| Castlevania: Lords of Shadow – Mirror of Fate | 2013 | 3DS | Castlevania: Lords of Shadow – Mirror of Fate HD | 2013 | PS3, Xbox 360, Windows | Remaster | |
| Castlevania: Rondo of Blood | 1993 | TurboGrafx-16 | Castlevania: The Dracula X Chronicles | 2007 | PSP | Remake | |
| Castlevania: The Adventure | 1989 | Game Boy, Nintendo 3DS | Castlevania: The Adventure ReBirth | 2009 | Wii | Remake | |
| Castle of Illusion Starring Mickey Mouse | 1990 | Genesis | Castle of Illusion Starring Mickey Mouse | 2013 | PS3, Xbox 360, Windows, iOS, Windows Phone, Android, OS X | Remake | |
| Catherine | 2011 | Windows, PS3, Xbox 360 | Catherine: Full Body | 2019 | PS4, PSV, Switch | Remake | |
| Cave Story | 2004 | Windows, Wii | Cave Story 3D | 2011 | 3DS | Remake | |
| Cave Story | 2004 | Windows, Wii | Cave Story+ | 2011 | Windows, Switch | Remaster | |
| Centipede | 1980 | Apple II, Arcade, Atari 2600, Atari 5200, Atari 7800, Atari 8-bit, BBC Micro, ColecoVision, C64, Game Boy, IBM PC, Intellivision, TI-99/4A, VIC-20 | Centipede | 1998 | Dreamcast, Macintosh, Windows, PS1 | Remake | |
| Chaos;Head | 2008 | Windows | Chaos;Head NoAH | 2009 | Xbox 360 | Remaster | |
| Chrono Cross | 1999 | PS1 | Chrono Cross: The Radical Dreamers Edition | 2022 | Windows, PS4, Xbox One, Switch | Remaster | |
| The Chronicles of Riddick: Escape from Butcher Bay | 2004 | Windows, Xbox | The Chronicles of Riddick: Assault on Dark Athena | 2009 | Xbox 360, PS3, Windows, Mac OS X | Remake | |
| Sid Meier's Colonization | 1994 | MS-DOS | Civilization IV: Colonization | 2008 | Windows, Mac OS X | Remake | |
| Command & Conquer | 1995 | MS-DOS, Saturn, PS1, Mac OS | Command & Conquer Remastered Collection | 2020 | Windows | Remasters | |
| Command & Conquer: Red Alert | 1996 | MS-DOS, Windows, PS1 | Command & Conquer Remastered Collection | 2020 | Windows | Remasters | |
| Commandos 2: Men of Courage | 2001 | Windows | Commandos 2: HD Remaster | 2020 | Windows, PS4, Xbox One, Nintendo Switch, iOS, Android | Remaster | |
| Commandos 3: Destination Berlin | 2003 | Windows | Commandos 3: HD Remaster | 2022 | Windows, PS4, Xbox One, Switch | Remaster | |
| Conker's Bad Fur Day | 2001 | N64 | Conker: Live & Reloaded | 2005 | Xbox | Remake | |
| Constructor | 1997 | MS-DOS | Constructor | 2017 | PS4, Xbox One, Windows, Switch | Remaster | |
| Cossacks: European Wars | 2001 | Windows | Cossacks 3 | 2016 | Windows, Linux | Remake | |
| Cotton: Fantastic Night Dreams | 1991 | Arcade | Cotton Reboot! | 2021 | Switch, PS4, Windows | Remake | |
| Counter-Strike | 1999 | Windows | Counter-Strike: Source | 2004 | Windows, Mac OS X, Linux | Remake | |
| Crash Bandicoot | 1996 | PS1 | Crash Bandicoot N. Sane Trilogy | 2017 | PS4, Xbox One, Switch, Windows | Remakes | |
| Crash Bandicoot 2: Cortex Strikes Back | 1997 | PS1 | Crash Bandicoot N. Sane Trilogy | 2017 | PS4, Xbox One, Switch, Windows | Remakes | |
| Crash Bandicoot: Warped | 1998 | PS1 | Crash Bandicoot N. Sane Trilogy | 2017 | PS4, Xbox One, Switch, Windows | Remakes | |
| Crash Team Racing | 1999 | PS1 | Crash Team Racing Nitro-Fueled | 2019 | PS4, Xbox One, Switch | Remasters | |
| Crash Nitro Kart | 2003 | PS2, GC, Xbox | Crash Team Racing Nitro-Fueled | 2019 | PS4, Xbox One, Switch | Remasters | |
| Crisis Core: Final Fantasy VII | 2007 | PSP | Crisis Core: Final Fantasy VII Reunion | 2022 | PS4, PS5, Xbox One, Xbox Series X/S, Switch, Windows | Remaster | |
| Crysis | 2007 | Windows, Xbox 360, PS3 | Crysis Remastered Trilogy | 2021 | PS4, Xbox One, Windows, Switch | Remasters | |
| Crysis 2 | 2011 | Windows, Xbox 360, PS3 | Crysis Remastered Trilogy | 2021 | PS4, Xbox One, Windows, Switch | Remasters | |
| Crysis 3 | 2013 | Windows, Xbox 360, PS3 | Crysis Remastered Trilogy | 2021 | PS4, Xbox One, Windows, Switch | Remasters | |
| Daikoukai Jidai IV: Porto Estado | 1999 | Windows, PS1 | Uncharted Waters IV: Rota Nova | 2006 | DS, PSP | Remake | |
| Daikoukai Jidai IV: Porto Estado | 1999 | Windows, PS1 | Uncharted Waters IV: HD Version | 2021 | Windows, Switch | Remaster | |
| Danganronpa 2: Goodbye Despair | 2012 | PSP, PSV, Windows, OS X, Linux, PS4, Android, iOS, Switch, Xbox One | Danganronpa 2×2 | 2026 | Switch, Switch 2, PS5, Xbox Series X/S, Windows | Remake | |
| Dark Souls | 2011 | PS3, Xbox 360 | Dark Souls: Remastered | 2018 | Windows, Switch, PS4, Xbox One | Remaster | |
| Dark Souls II | 2014 | PS3, Xbox 360, Windows | Dark Souls II: Scholar of the First Sin | 2015 | Windows, PS4, Xbox One | Remaster | |
| Darksiders | 2010 | Windows, PS3, Xbox 360 | Darksiders: Warmastered Edition | 2016 | Windows, Switch, PS4, Wii U, Xbox One | Remaster | |
| Darksiders II | 2012 | Windows, PS3, Wii U, Xbox 360 | Darksiders II: Deathinitive Edition | 2015 | Windows, Switch, PS4, Xbox One | Remaster | |
| Darkstalkers: The Night Warriors | 1995 | Arcade, Saturn | Darkstalkers Resurrection | 2013 | PS3, Xbox 360 | Remaster | |
| Darkstalkers 3 | 1997 | Arcade, Saturn, PS1 | Darkstalkers Resurrection | 2013 | PS3, Xbox 360 | Remaster | |
| Day of Defeat | 2003 | Windows | Day of Defeat: Source | 2005 | Windows, OS X, Linux | Remake | |
| Day of the Tentacle | 1993 | MS-DOS, Classic Mac OS | Day of the Tentacle Remastered | 2016 | Windows, OS X, PS4, PSV, Linux, iOS | Remaster | |
| Dead or Alive 2 | 1999 | Arcade, Dreamcast, PS2 | Dead or Alive Ultimate | 2004 | Xbox | Remake | |
| Dead Rising | 2006 | Xbox 360 | Dead Rising Deluxe Remaster | 2024 | PS5, Xbox Series X/S, Windows | Remaster | |
| Dead Space | 2008 | Windows, PS3, Xbox 360 | Dead Space | 2023 | PS5, Xbox Series X/S, Windows | Remake | |
| Death Rally | 1996 | MS-DOS | Death Rally | 2011 | iOS, Android, Windows, Fire OS | Remake | |
| Defender | 1981 | Arcade | Defender | 2002 | PS2 | Remake | |
| Defender of the Crown | 1986 | Amiga | Robin Hood: Defender of the Crown | 2003 | PS2, Xbox, Windows | Remake | |
| Demon's Souls | 2009 | PS3 | Demon's Souls | 2020 | PS5 | Remake | |
| Destroy All Humans! | 2005 | PS2, Xbox | Destroy All Humans! | 2020 | PS4, Xbox One, Windows, Stadia | Remake | |
| Destroy All Humans! 2 | 2006 | PS2, Xbox | Destroy All Humans! 2: Reprobed | 2022 | PS5, Xbox Series X/S, Windows | Remake | |
| Deus Ex | 2000 | Windows, Mac OS | Deus Ex: Remastered | TBA | PS5, Xbox Series X/S, Windows, Switch | Remaster | |
| Devil May Cry | 2001 | PS2 | Devil May Cry HD Collection | 2012 | PS3, PS4, Xbox 360, Xbox One, Windows | Remasters | |
| Devil May Cry 2 | 2003 | PS2 | Devil May Cry HD Collection | 2012 | PS3, PS4, Xbox 360, Xbox One, Windows | Remasters | |
| Devil May Cry 3: Dante's Awakening | 2005 | PS2 | Devil May Cry HD Collection | 2012 | PS3, PS4, Xbox 360, Xbox One, Windows | Remasters | |
| Devil May Cry 4 | 2008 | PS3, Xbox 360, Windows, Android, iOS, Shield Android TV | Devil May Cry 4: Special Edition | 2015 | Windows, PS4, Xbox One | Remaster | |
| Diablo II | 2000 | Windows | Diablo II: Resurrected | 2021 | Windows, PS4, PS5, Xbox One, Xbox Series X/S, Switch | Remaster | |
| Diddy Kong Racing | 1997 | N64 | Diddy Kong Racing DS | 2007 | DS | Remake | |
| Digital Devil Story: Megami Tensei | 1987 | NES | Kyuuyaku Megami Tensei | 1995 | SNES | Remakes | |
| Digital Devil Story: Megami Tensei II | 1990 | NES | Kyuuyaku Megami Tensei | 1995 | SNES | Remakes | |
| Dinosaur | 1990 | PC-88, PC-98, FM Towns | Dinosaur Resurrection | 2002 | Windows | Remake | |
| DmC: Devil May Cry | 2013 | PS3, Xbox 360, Windows | DmC: Definitive Edition | 2015 | PS4, Xbox One | Remaster | |
| Doom | 1993 | MS-DOS | Doom + Doom II | 2024 | Xbox One, Xbox Series X/S, Windows, Switch, PS4, PS5 | Remaster | |
| Doom II | 1994 | MS-DOS | Doom + Doom II | 2024 | Xbox One, Xbox Series X/S, Windows, Switch, PS4, PS5 | Remaster | |
| Doom 3 | 2004 | Windows, Xbox | Doom 3: BFG Edition | 2012 | Xbox 360, PS3, PS4, Xbox One, Switch, Windows | Remaster | |
| Donkey Kong Country Returns | 2010 | Wii | Donkey Kong Country Returns HD | 2025 | Switch | Remaster | |
| Double Dragon | 1987 | Arcade | Double Dragon Advance | 2003 | GBA | Remake | |
| Double Dragon II: The Revenge | 1988 | Arcade | Double Dragon II: Wander of the Dragons | 2013 | Xbox 360 | Remake | |
| Dragon Ball Z: Budokai | 2002 | PS2, GC | Dragon Ball Z: Budokai HD Collection | 2012 | PS3, Xbox 360 | Remasters | |
| Dragon Ball Z: Budokai 3 | 2004 | PS2 | Dragon Ball Z: Budokai HD Collection | 2012 | PS3, Xbox 360 | Remasters | |
| Dragon Quest | 1986 | NES | Dragon Quest I & II | 1993 | SNES | Remake | |
| Dragon Quest | 1986 | NES | Dragon Warrior I & II | 1999 | GBC | Remake | |
| Dragon Quest | 1986 | NES | Dragon Quest I & II HD-2D Remake | 2025 | PS5, PS4, Switch, Windows | Remake | |
| Dragon Quest II | 1987 | NES | Dragon Quest I & II | 1993 | SNES | Remake | |
| Dragon Quest II | 1987 | NES | Dragon Warrior I & II | 1999 | GBC | Remake | |
| Dragon Quest II | 1987 | NES | Dragon Quest I & II HD-2D Remake | 2025 | PS5, PS4, Switch, Windows | Remake | |
| Dragon Quest III | 1988 | NES | Dragon Quest III | 1996 | SNES | Remake | |
| Dragon Quest III | 1988 | NES | Dragon Quest III | 2000 | GBC | Remake | |
| Dragon Quest III | 1988 | NES | Dragon Quest III HD-2D Remake | 2024 | Nintendo Switch, PS5, Windows, Xbox Series X/S | Remake | |
| Dragon Quest IV | 1990 | NES | Dragon Quest IV | 2001 | PS1 | Remake | |
| Dragon Quest IV | 1990 | NES | Dragon Quest IV: Chapters of the Chosen | 2007 | DS | Remake | |
| Dragon Quest V | 1992 | SNES | Dragon Quest V: Tenkū no Hanayome | 2004 | PS2 | Remake | |
| Dragon Quest V | 1992 | SNES | Dragon Quest V: Hand of the Heavenly Bride | 2008 | DS | Remake | |
| Dragon Quest VI | 1995 | SNES | Dragon Quest VI: Realms of Revelation | 2010 | DS, Android, iOS | Remake | |
| Dragon Quest VII | 2000 | PS1 | Dragon Quest VII: Fragments of the Forgotten Past | 2013 | 3DS, Android, iOS | Remake | |
| Dragon Quest VII | 2000 | PS1 | Dragon Quest VII Reimagined | 2026 | PS5, Xbox Series X/S, Switch, Switch 2, Windows | Remake | |
| DuckTales | 1989 | NES, GB | DuckTales: Remastered | 2013 | PS3, Xbox 360, Wii U, Windows, iOS, Android, Windows Phone | Remake | |
| Duke Nukem 3D | 1996 | Windows | Duke Nukem 3D 20th Anniversary World Tour | 2016 | Windows, PS4, Xbox One, Switch | Remaster | |
| Dune II | 1992 | MS-DOS | Dune 2000 | 1998 | Windows, PS1 | Remake | |
| Earthworm Jim | 1994 | Genesis | Earthworm Jim HD | 2010 | Xbox 360, PS3 | Remake | |
| The Elder Scrolls IV: Oblivion | 2006 | Windows, Xbox 360, PS3 | The Elder Scrolls IV: Oblivion Remastered | 2025 | Windows, PS5, Xbox Series X/S | Remaster | |
| The Elder Scrolls V: Skyrim | 2011 | Windows, PS3, Xbox 360 | The Elder Scrolls V: Skyrim Special Edition | 2016 | Windows, PS4, Xbox 360, Switch | Remaster | |
| Epic Mickey | 2010 | Wii | Epic Mickey: Rebrushed | 2024 | Switch, PS4, PS5, Windows, Xbox One, Xbox Series X/S | Remake | |
| Fahrenheit | 2005 | PS2, Xbox, Windows | Fahrenheit: Indigo Prophecy Remastered | 2016 | Windows, Linux, OS X, iOS, Android, PS4 | Remaster | |
| Famicom Detective Club: The Missing Heir | 1988 | Famicom Disk System | Famicom Detective Club: The Missing Heir | 2021 | Switch | Remake | |
| Famicom Detective Club: The Girl Who Stands Behind | 1989 | Famicom Disk System | Famicom Detective Club: The Girl Who Stands Behind | 1998 | SNES | Remake | |
| Famicom Detective Club: The Girl Who Stands Behind | 1989 | Famicom Disk System | Famicom Detective Club: The Girl Who Stands Behind | 2021 | Switch | Remake | |
| Fantasy Zone | 1986 | Arcade | Sega Ages 2500 Vol. 3: Fantasy Zone | 2003 | PS2 | Remake | |
| Far Cry 3 | 2013 | Windows, PS3, Xbox 360 | Far Cry 3: Classic Edition | 2018 | PS4, Xbox One | Remaster | |
| Far Cry 3: Blood Dragon | 2014 | Windows, PS3, Xbox 360 | Far Cry 3: Blood Dragon Classic Edition | 2021 | Windows, PS4, Xbox One | Remaster | |
| Fatal Frame II: Crimson Butterfly | 2003 | PS2, Xbox | Project Zero 2: Wii Edition | 2012 | Wii | Remake | |
| Fatal Frame II: Crimson Butterfly | 2003 | PS2, Xbox | Fatal Frame II: Crimson Butterfly Remake | 2026 | PS5, Xbox Series X/S, Switch 2, Windows | Remake | |
| Fatal Frame: Maiden of Black Water | 2014 | Wii U | Fatal Frame: Maiden of Black Water | 2021 | Switch, PS4, PS5, Windows, Xbox One, Xbox Series X/S | Remaster | |
| Fatal Frame: Mask of the Lunar Eclipse | 2008 | Wii | Fatal Frame: Mask of the Lunar Eclipse | 2023 | Switch, PS4, PS5, Windows, Xbox One, Xbox Series X/S | Remaster | |
| Final Fantasy | 1987 | NES, MSX | Final Fantasy | 2000 | WonderSwan Color | Remake | |
| Final Fantasy | 1987 | NES, MSX | Final Fantasy Origins | 2002 | PS1 | Remake | |
| Final Fantasy | 1987 | NES, MSX | Final Fantasy I & II: Dawn of Souls | 2002 | GBA | Remake | |
| Final Fantasy | 1987 | NES, MSX | Final Fantasy: Anniversary Edition | 2007 | PSP, iOS, Android, Windows Phone | Remake | |
| Final Fantasy | 1987 | NES, MSX | Final Fantasy Pixel Remaster | 2021 | Windows, iOS, Android, PS4, Switch, Xbox Series X/S | Remaster | |
| Final Fantasy II | 1988 | NES | Final Fantasy II | 2001 | WonderSwan Color | Remake | |
| Final Fantasy II | 1988 | NES | Final Fantasy Origins | 2002 | PS1 | Remake | |
| Final Fantasy II | 1988 | NES | Final Fantasy I & II: Dawn of Souls | 2002 | GBA | Remake | |
| Final Fantasy II | 1988 | NES | Final Fantasy II: Anniversary Edition | 2007 | PSP | Remake | |
| Final Fantasy II | 1988 | NES | Final Fantasy II Pixel Remaster | 2021 | Windows, iOS, Android, PS4, Switch, Xbox Series X/S | Remaster | |
| Final Fantasy III | 1990 | NES | Final Fantasy III | 2006 | DS, PSP, iOS, Android, Windows, Windows Phone | Remake | |
| Final Fantasy III | 1990 | NES | Final Fantasy III Pixel Remaster | 2021 | Windows, iOS, Android, PS4, Switch, Xbox Series X/S | Remaster | |
| Final Fantasy IV | 1991 | SNES | Final Fantasy IV | 2002 | WonderSwan Color | Remake | |
| Final Fantasy IV | 1991 | SNES | Final Fantasy IV Advance | 2005 | GBA | Remake | |
| Final Fantasy IV | 1991 | SNES | Final Fantasy IV | 2007 | DS | Remake | |
| Final Fantasy IV | 1991 | SNES | Final Fantasy IV: The Complete Collection | 2011 | PSP | Remaster | |
| Final Fantasy IV | 1991 | SNES | Final Fantasy IV Pixel Remaster | 2021 | Windows, iOS, Android, PS4, Switch, Xbox Series X/S | Remaster | |
| Final Fantasy IV: The After Years | 2008 | FOMA 903i/703i | Final Fantasy IV: The Complete Collection | 2011 | PSP | Remaster | |
| Final Fantasy IV: The After Years | 2008 | FOMA 903i/703i | Final Fantasy IV: The After Years | 2013 | Windows, iOS, Android | Remake | |
| Final Fantasy V | 1992 | SNES | Final Fantasy V | 2013 | iOS, Android, Windows | Remake | |
| Final Fantasy V | 1992 | SNES | Final Fantasy V Pixel Remaster | 2021 | Windows, iOS, Android, PS4, Switch, Xbox Series X/S | Remaster | |
| Final Fantasy VI | 1994 | SNES | Final Fantasy VI | 2014 | Windows, iOS, Android | Remake | |
| Final Fantasy VI | 1994 | SNES | Final Fantasy VI Pixel Remaster | 2022 | Windows, iOS, Android, PS4, Switch, Xbox Series X/S | Remaster | |
| Final Fantasy VII | 1997 | PS1 | Final Fantasy VII Remake | 2020 | PS4, PS5, Switch, Windows, Xbox Series X/S | Remake | |
| Final Fantasy VII | 1997 | PS1 | Final Fantasy VII Rebirth | 2024 | PS5, Switch 2, Windows, Xbox Series X/S | Remake | |
| Final Fantasy VII | 1997 | PS1 | Final Fantasy VII Revelation | 2027 | PS5, Switch 2, Windows, Xbox Series X/S | Remake | |
| Final Fantasy VIII | 1999 | PS1 | Final Fantasy VIII Remastered | 2019 | Windows, Switch, PS4, Xbox One | Remaster | |
| Final Fantasy IX | 2000 | PS1 | Final Fantasy IX | 2016 | Windows, Android, iOS, Switch, PS4, Xbox One | Remaster | |
| Final Fantasy X | 2001 | PS2 | Final Fantasy X/X-2 HD Remaster | 2013 | Windows, Switch, PS3, PSV, PS4, Xbox One | Remaster | |
| Final Fantasy X-2 | 2003 | PS2 | Final Fantasy X/X-2 HD Remaster | 2013 | Windows, Switch, PS3, PSV, PS4, Xbox One | Remaster | |
| Final Fantasy XII | 2006 | PS2 | Final Fantasy XII: The Zodiac Age | 2017 | Windows, Switch, PS4, Xbox One | Remaster | |
| Final Fantasy XV | 2016 | PS4, Xbox One, Windows | Final Fantasy XV: Pocket Edition | 2018 | Android, iOS, Windows, PS4, Xbox One, Switch | Remake | |
| Final Fantasy Tactics | 1997 | PS1 | Final Fantasy Tactics: The War of the Lions | 2007 | PSP | Remake | |
| Final Fantasy Tactics | 1997 | PS1 | Final Fantasy Tactics: The Ivalice Chronicles | 2025 | PS4, PS5, Switch, Switch 2, Xbox Series X/S, Windows | Remaster | |
| Final Fantasy Crystal Chronicles | 2003 | GC | Final Fantasy Crystal Chronicles: Remastered Edition | 2020 | Switch, PS4, Android, iOS | Remaster | |
| Final Fantasy Type-0 | 2011 | PSP | Final Fantasy Type-0 HD | 2015 | PS4, Xbox One, Windows | Remaster | |
| Final Fantasy Adventure | 1991 | GB | Sword of Mana | 2003 | GBA | Remake | |
| Final Fantasy Adventure | 1991 | GB | Adventures of Mana | 2016 | Android, iOS, PSV | Remake | |
| The Final Fantasy Legend | 1989 | GB | Makai Toushi Sa·Ga | 2002 | WonderSwan Color | Remake | |
| Final Fantasy Legend II | 1990 | GB | SaGa 2 Hihō Densetsu: Goddess of Destiny | 2009 | DS | Remake | |
| Final Fantasy Legend III | 1991 | GB | SaGa 3 Jikū no Hasha: Shadow or Light | 2011 | DS | Remake | |
| Final Fantasy Fables: Chocobo's Dungeon | 2007 | Wii | Chocobo's Mystery Dungeon Every Buddy! | 2019 | Switch, PS4 | Remaster | |
| Fire Emblem: Shadow Dragon and the Blade of Light | 1990 | NES | Fire Emblem: Mystery of the Emblem | 1994 | SNES | Remake | |
| Fire Emblem: Shadow Dragon and the Blade of Light | 1990 | NES | Fire Emblem: Shadow Dragon | 2008 | DS | Remake | |
| Fire Emblem: Mystery of the Emblem | 1994 | SNES | Fire Emblem: New Mystery of the Emblem | 2010 | DS | Remake | |
| Fire Emblem Gaiden | 1992 | NES | Fire Emblem Echoes: Shadows of Valentia | 2017 | 3DS | Remake | |
| Flashback | 1992 | Amiga | Flashback | 2013 | Windows, PS3, Xbox 360 | Remake | |
| Forsaken | 1998 | Windows, PS1, N64 | Forsaken Remastered | 2018 | Windows, Linux, MacOS, Xbox One | Remaster | |
| Frogger | 1981 | Arcade | Frogger: He's Back! | 1997 | PS1, Windows | Remake | |
| Frozen Synapse | 2011 | Windows, Mac OS X | Frozen Synapse Prime | 2014 | PSV, Windows, Android, PS3 | Remake | |
| Full Throttle | 1995 | MS-DOS, Windows, Mac OS | Full Throttle Remastered | 2017 | Windows, OS X, Linux, PS4, PSV | Remaster | |
| Gabriel Knight: Sins of the Fathers | 1993 | MS-DOS, Macintosh | Gabriel Knight: Sins of the Fathers 20th Anniversary Edition | 2014 | Windows, OS X | Remake | |
| Gears of War | 2006 | Xbox 360, Windows | Gears of War: Ultimate Edition | 2015 | Xbox One, Windows | Remaster | |
| God of War | 2005 | PS2 | God of War Collection | 2009 | PS3, PSV | Remasters | |
| God of War II | 2007 | PS2 | God of War Collection | 2009 | PS3, PSV | Remasters | |
| God of War III | 2010 | PS3 | God of War III Remastered | 2015 | PS4 | Remaster | |
| God of War: Chains of Olympus | 2008 | PSP | God of War: Origins Collection | 2011 | PS3 | Remasters | |
| God of War: Ghost of Sparta | 2010 | PSP | God of War: Origins Collection | 2011 | PS3 | Remasters | |
| Gods | 1991 | Amiga, Atari ST | Gods Remastered | 2018 | Xbox One, Windows, macOS, Switch, PS4 | Remaster | |
| Gothic | 2001 | Windows | Gothic 1 Remake | 2026 | Windows, PS5, Xbox Series X/S | Remake | |
| Gold Rush! | 1988 | NES | Gold Rush! Anniversary | 2014 | Windows, OS X, Linux, iOS, Android | Remake | |
| GoldenEye 007 | 1997 | N64 | GoldenEye 007 | 2010 | Wii | Remake | |
| GoldenEye 007 | 2010 | Wii | Goldeneye 007: Reloaded | 2011 | PS3, Xbox 360 | Remaster | |
| Grand Theft Auto III | 2001 | PS2, Xbox, Windows, Android, iOS, PS3, Xbox 360 | Grand Theft Auto: The Trilogy – The Definitive Edition | 2021 | PS4, Xbox One, Switch, Windows, PS5, Xbox Series X/S, Android, iOS | Remasters | |
| Grand Theft Auto: Vice City | 2002 | PS2, Xbox, Windows, Android, iOS, PS3, Xbox 360 | Grand Theft Auto: The Trilogy – The Definitive Edition | 2021 | PS4, Xbox One, Switch, Windows, PS5, Xbox Series X/S, Android, iOS | Remasters | |
| Grand Theft Auto: San Andreas | 2004 | PS2, Xbox, Windows, Android, iOS, PS3, Xbox 360 | Grand Theft Auto: The Trilogy – The Definitive Edition | 2021 | PS4, Xbox One, Switch, Windows, PS5, Xbox Series X/S, Android, iOS | Remasters | |
| Grandia | 1997 | Saturn, PS1 | Grandia HD Remaster | 2019 | Windows | Remasters | |
| Grandia | 1997 | Saturn, PS1 | Grandia HD Collection | 2019 | Windows, Switch, PS4, Xbox One | Remasters | |
| Grandia II | 2000 | Dreamcast, PS2, Windows | Grandia HD Collection | 2019 | Windows, Switch, PS4, Xbox One | Remasters | |
| Grandia II | 2000 | Dreamcast, PS2, Windows | Grandia II HD Remaster | 2015 | Windows | Remasters | |
| Gravity Rush | 2012 | PSV | Gravity Rush Remastered | 2015 | PS4 | Remaster | |
| The Great Ace Attorney: Adventures | 2015 | 3DS | The Great Ace Attorney Chronicles | 2021 | Switch, PS4, Windows | Remasters | |
| The Great Ace Attorney 2: Resolve | 2017 | 3DS | The Great Ace Attorney Chronicles | 2021 | Switch, PS4, Windows | Remasters | |
| Grim Fandango | 1998 | Windows | Grim Fandango Remastered | 2015 | PS4, PSV, Windows, OS X, Linux, Switch | Remaster | |
| Guardian Heroes | 1996 | Saturn | Guardian Heroes | 2011 | Xbox 360 | Remaster | |
| Half-Life | 1998 | Windows, Mac OS, Linux, PS2 | Black Mesa | 2020 | Windows, Linux | Remake | |
| Halo: Combat Evolved | 2001 | Xbox, Windows, Mac OS X | Halo: Combat Evolved Anniversary | 2011 | Xbox 360 | Remake | |
| Halo: Combat Evolved | 2001 | Xbox, Windows, Mac OS X | Halo: Campaign Evolved | 2026 | Windows, Xbox Series X/S, PS5 | Remake | |
| Halo: Combat Evolved | 2001 | Xbox, Windows, Mac OS X | Halo: The Master Chief Collection | 2014 | Windows, Xbox One, Xbox Series X/S | Remasters | |
| Halo 2 | 2004 | Xbox | Halo: The Master Chief Collection | 2014 | Windows, Xbox One, Xbox Series X/S | Remasters | |
| Halo 3 | 2007 | Xbox 360 | Halo: The Master Chief Collection | 2014 | Windows, Xbox One, Xbox Series X/S | Remasters | |
| Halo 3: ODST | 2009 | Xbox 360 | Halo: The Master Chief Collection | 2014 | Windows, Xbox One, Xbox Series X/S | Remasters | |
| Halo: Reach | 2010 | Xbox 360 | Halo: The Master Chief Collection | 2014 | Windows, Xbox One, Xbox Series X/S | Remasters | |
| Halo 4 | 2012 | Xbox 360 | Halo: The Master Chief Collection | 2014 | Windows, Xbox One, Xbox Series X/S | Remasters | |
| Halo Wars | 2009 | Xbox 360 | Halo Wars: Definitive Edition | 2016 | Xbox One, Windows | Remaster | |
| Hard Reset | 2011 | Windows | Hard Reset Redux | 2016 | Windows, PS4, Xbox One | Remaster | |
| Haunted Castle | 1987 | Arcade | Haunted Castle Revisited | 2024 | Windows, Switch, Xbox Series X/S, PS5 | Remake | |
| Head Over Heels | 1987 | CPC, PCW, Atari 8-bit, Atari ST, C64, Amiga, MSX, ZX Spectrum | Head Over Heels | 2003 | Windows, Linux, Mac OS X, BeOS | Remake | |
| Heroes of Might and Magic III | 1999 | Windows | Heroes of Might and Magic III – HD Edition | 2015 | Windows, iOS, Android | Remaster | |
| Hitman 2: Silent Assassin | 2002 | Windows, PS2, Xbox | Hitman HD Trilogy | 2013 | PS3, Xbox 360 | Remasters | |
| Hitman: Contracts | 2004 | Windows, PS2, Xbox | Hitman HD Trilogy | 2013 | PS3, Xbox 360 | Remasters | |
| Hitman: Blood Money | 2006 | Windows, PS2, Xbox | Hitman HD Trilogy | 2013 | PS3, Xbox 360 | Remasters | |
| Hitman: Blood Money | 2006 | Xbox 360 | Hitman HD Enhanced Collection | 2019 | PS4, Xbox One | Remasters | |
| Hitman: Absolution | 2012 | Windows, PS3, Xbox 360 | Hitman HD Enhanced Collection | 2019 | PS4, Xbox One | Remasters | |
| Homeworld | 1999 | Windows | Homeworld Remastered Collection | 2015 | Windows, OS X | Remasters | |
| Homeworld 2 | 2003 | Windows, Mac OS X | Homeworld Remastered Collection | 2015 | Windows, OS X | Remasters | |
| The House of the Dead | 1996 | Arcade | The House of the Dead: Remake | 2022 | Switch, PS4, Stadia, Xbox One, Xbox Series X/, PS5 | Remake | |
| The House of the Dead 2 | 1998 | Arcade | The House of the Dead 2: Remake | 2025 | Switch, PS4, Xbox One, Xbox Series X/S, PS5, Windows | Remake | |
| Icewind Dale | 2000 | Windows, OS X | Icewind Dale: Enhanced Edition | 2014 | Windows, OS X, Linux, iOS, Android | Remaster | |
| Ico | 2001 | PS2 | The Ico & Shadow of the Colossus Collection | 2011 | PS3 | Remaster | |
| Impossible Mission | 1984 | Acorn Electron, CPC, Apple II, Atari 7800, BBC Micro, C64, NES, Master System, ZX Spectrum | Impossible Mission 2025 | 1994 | Amiga | Remake | |
| Impossible Mission | 1984 | Acorn Electron, CPC, Apple II, Atari 7800, BBC Micro, C64, NES, Master System, ZX Spectrum | Impossible Mission | 2007 | PSP, DS, Wii, PS2 | Remake | |
| Jagged Alliance 2 | 1999 | Windows | Jagged Alliance: Back in Action | 2012 | Windows | Remake | |
| Jak and Daxter: The Precursor Legacy | 2001 | PS2 | Jak and Daxter Collection | 2012 | PS3, PSV | Remasters | |
| Jak II | 2003 | PS2 | Jak and Daxter Collection | 2012 | PS3, PSV | Remasters | |
| Jak 3 | 2004 | PS2 | Jak and Daxter Collection | 2012 | PS3, PSV | Remasters | |
| Jetpac | 1983 | ZX Spectrum, BBC Micro, VIC-20 | Jetpac Refuelled | 2007 | Xbox 360, Xbox One | Remake | |
| Joe & Mac | 1991 | Arcade | New Joe & Mac: Caveman Ninja | 2022 | Switch, Windows, PS4, PS5, Xbox One, Xbox Series X/S | Remake | |
| The Journeyman Project | 1993 | Macintosh, Windows | The Journeyman Project: Pegasus Prime | 2014 | Linux, Macintosh, Windows | Remake | |
| Kamaitachi no Yoru ×3 | 2006 | PS2 | Kamaitachi no Yoru ×3 | 2024 | Switch, Windows, PS4 | Remaster | |
| Karateka | 1984 | Apple II | Karateka | 2012 | Xbox 360, Windows, PS3, iOS | Remake | |
| Kimi ga Ita Kisetsu | 1999 | Windows | Kimi ga Ita Kisetsu – First Press Limited Edition | 2011 | Windows | Remake | |
| The King of Fighters '94 | 1994 | Neo Geo | The King of Fighters '94 Re-Bout | 2004 | PS2 | Remake | |
| The King of Fighters '98 | 1998 | Neo Geo | The King of Fighters '98: Ultimate Match | 2009 | PS2, Windows, PS4 | Remake | |
| The King of Fighters 2002 | 2002 | Neo Geo | The King of Fighters 2002 Unlimited Match | 2009 | PS2, Windows, Xbox 360 | Remake | |
| Kingdom Hearts | 2002 | PS2 | Kingdom Hearts HD 1.5 Remix | 2013 | PS3, PS4, Xbox One, Windows, Switch, PS5, Xbox Series X, Switch 2 | Remaster | |
| Kingdom Hearts II | 2005 | PS2 | Kingdom Hearts HD 2.5 Remix | 2014 | PS3, PS4, Xbox One, Windows, Switch, PS5, Xbox Series X, Switch 2 | Remaster | |
| Kingdom Hearts 3D: Dream Drop Distance | 2012 | 3DS | Kingdom Hearts HD 2.8 Final Chapter Prologue | 2017 | PS4, Xbox One, Windows, Switch, PS5, Xbox Series X, Switch 2 | Remaster | |
| Kingdom Hearts Birth by Sleep | 2010 | PSP | Kingdom Hearts HD 2.5 Remix | 2014 | PS3, PS4, Xbox One, Windows, Switch, PS5, Xbox Series X, Switch 2 | Remaster | |
| Kingdom Hearts: Chain of Memories | 2004 | GBA | Kingdom Hearts Re:Chain of Memories | 2007 | PS2 | Remake | |
| Kingdom Hearts: Chain of Memories | 2004 | GBA | Kingdom Hearts HD 1.5 Remix | 2013 | PS3, PS4, Xbox One, Windows, Switch, PS5, Xbox Series X, Switch 2 | Remake | |
| Kingdom Hearts Coded | 2008 | Mobile phones | Kingdom Hearts Re:coded | 2010 | DS | Remake | |
| Kingdoms of Amalur: Reckoning | 2012 | Windows, Xbox 360, PS3 | Kingdoms of Amalur: Re-Reckoning | 2020 | Windows, Xbox One, PS4, Switch | Remaster | |
| Kingpin: Life of Crime | 1999 | Windows | Kingpin: Reloaded | 2023 | Windows | Remaster | |
| King's Bounty | 1990 | MS-DOS, C64 | Heroes of Might and Magic: Quest for the Dragon Bone Staff | 2001 | PS2 | Remake | |
| Killing Time | 1995 | 3DO, Windows, Mac OS | Killing Time: Resurrected | 2024 | Switch, PS4, PS5, Windows, Xbox One, Xbox Series X/S | Remaster | |
| King's Quest I | 1984 | IBM PCjr | King's Quest I: Quest for the Crown | 1990 | Amiga, DOS | Remake | |
| King's Quest II | 1985 | DOS, Macintosh, Apple II, Apple IIGS, Amiga, Atari ST, IBM PCjr, Tandy 1000 | King's Quest II: Romancing the Stones | 2002 | Windows, Macintosh | Remake | |
| King's Quest III | 1986 | Apple II, DOS | King's Quest III: To Heir Is Human | 2006 | Windows | Remake | |
| King's Quest III | 1986 | Apple II, DOS | King's Quest III: To Heir Is Human | 2011 | Windows, Mac OS X | Remake | |
| Kirby's Adventure | 1993 | NES | Kirby: Nightmare in Dream Land | 2002 | GBA | Remake | |
| Kirby's Return to Dream Land | 2011 | Wii | Kirby's Return to Dream Land Deluxe | 2023 | Switch | Remake | |
| Kirby's Star Stacker | 1997 | Game Boy | Kirby's Super Star Stacker | 1998 | Super Famicom | Remaster | |
| Kirby Super Star | 1996 | SNES | Kirby Super Star Ultra | 2008 | DS | Remake | |
| Klonoa: Door to Phantomile | 1997 | PS1 | Klonoa | 2008 | Wii | Remake | |
| Klonoa: Door to Phantomile | 1997 | PS1 | Klonoa Phantasy Reverie Series | 2022 | Switch, PS4, PS5, Windows, Xbox One, Xbox Series X/S | Remasters | |
| Klonoa 2: Lunatea's Veil | 2001 | PS2 | Klonoa Phantasy Reverie Series | 2022 | Switch, PS4, PS5, Windows, Xbox One, Xbox Series X/S | Remasters | |
| La Abadía del Crimen | 1987 | CPC, DOS, MSX, ZX Spectrum | The Abbey of Crime: Extensum | 2016 | Linux, Mac OS X, Windows | Remake | |
| La-Mulana | 2005 | Windows | La-Mulana | 2011 | Wii, Windows, macOS, Linux | Remake | |
| La-Mulana | 2005 | Windows | La-Mulana EX | 2014 | PSV | Remake | |
| The Last of Us | 2013 | PS3 | The Last of Us Remastered | 2014 | PS4 | Remaster | |
| The Last of Us | 2013 | PS3 | The Last of Us Part I | 2022 | Windows, PS5 | Remake | |
| Layers of Fear | 2016 | Windows, macOS, Linux, PS4, Xbox One | Layers of Fear | 2023 | Windows, MacOS, PS5, Xbox Series X/S | Remakes | |
| Layers of Fear 2 | 2019 | Windows, PS4, Xbox One | Layers of Fear | 2023 | Windows, MacOS, PS5, Xbox Series X/S | Remakes | |
| Legend of Mana | 1999 | PS1 | Legend of Mana | 2021 | Windows, Switch, PS4 | Remaster | |
| The Legend of Heroes: Trails in the Sky | 2004 | Windows | Trails in the Sky 1st Chapter | 2025 | Switch, PS5, Windows | Remake | |
| The Legend of Zelda | 1986 | NES | BS Zelda no Densetsu | 1995 | SNES | Remake | |
| The Legend of Zelda: Link's Awakening | 1993 | GB | The Legend of Zelda: Link's Awakening DX | 1998 | GBC | Remaster | |
| The Legend of Zelda: Link's Awakening | 1993 | GB | The Legend of Zelda: Link's Awakening | 2019 | Switch | Remake | |
| The Legend of Zelda: Ocarina of Time | 1998 | N64 | The Legend of Zelda: Ocarina of Time 3D | 2011 | 3DS | Remaster | |
| The Legend of Zelda: Ocarina of Time | 1998 | N64 | The Legend of Zelda: Ocarina of Time | 2026 | Switch 2 | Remake | |
| The Legend of Zelda: Majora's Mask | 2000 | N64 | The Legend of Zelda: Majora's Mask 3D | 2015 | 3DS | Remaster | |
| The Legend of Zelda: The Wind Waker | 2002 | GC | The Legend of Zelda: The Wind Waker HD | 2013 | Wii U | Remaster | |
| The Legend of Zelda: Twilight Princess | 2006 | GC, Wii | The Legend of Zelda: Twilight Princess HD | 2016 | Wii U | Remaster | |
| The Legend of Zelda: Skyward Sword | 2011 | Wii | The Legend of Zelda: Skyward Sword HD | 2021 | Switch | Remaster | |
| Leisure Suit Larry in the Land of the Lounge Lizards | 1987 | DOS, Apple II | Leisure Suit Larry in the Land of the Lounge Lizards | 1991 | DOS, Macintosh, Amiga | Remake | |
| Leisure Suit Larry in the Land of the Lounge Lizards | 1987 | DOS, Apple II | Leisure Suit Larry: Reloaded | 2013 | Windows, OS X, Linux, Android, iOS | Remake | |
| Lemmings | 1991 | Amiga, Atari ST, MS-DOS | Lemmings | 2006 | PS2, PS3, PSP | Remake | |
| Life Is Strange | 2015 | Android, iOS, Linux, Mac OS X, Windows, Switch, PS3, PS4, Xbox 360, Xbox One | Life Is Strange Remastered Collection | 2022 | Windows, Switch, PS4, Stadia, Xbox One | Remasters | |
| Life Is Strange: Before the Storm | 2017 | Android, iOS, Linux, MacOS, Windows, Switch, PS4, Xbox One | Life Is Strange Remastered Collection | 2022 | Windows, Switch, PS4, Stadia, Xbox One | Remasters | |
| Lone Survivor | 2012 | Windows, OS X | Super Lone Survivor | 2022 | Switch, Windows | Remake | |
| The Light | 2012 | Windows | In Rays of the Light | 2020 | Windows, Switch, PS4, PS5, Xbox One, Xbox Series X/S | Remake | |
| Lode Runner | 1983 | Apple II, Atari 8-bit, C64, VIC-20, IBM PC | Lode Runner: The Legend Returns | 1994 | MS-DOS, Mac OS, PS1, Saturn, Windows | Remake | |
| Lode Runner | 1983 | Apple II, Atari 8-bit, C64, VIC-20, IBM PC | Lode Runner | 2006 | DS | Remake | |
| Lode Runner | 1983 | Apple II, Atari 8-bit, C64, VIC-20, IBM PC | Lode Runner | 2009 | Xbox 360 | Remake | |
| Luigi's Mansion | 2001 | GC | Luigi's Mansion | 2018 | 3DS | Remake | |
| Luigi's Mansion: Dark Moon | 2013 | 3DS | Luigi's Mansion 2 HD | 2024 | Switch | Remaster | |
| Lufia II: Rise of the Sinistrals | 1995 | SNES | Lufia: Curse of the Sinistrals | 2010 | DS | Remake | |
| Lunar: The Silver Star | 1992 | Sega CD | Lunar: Silver Star Story Complete | 1996 | Saturn, PS1, Windows, iOS, Android | Remake | |
| Lunar: The Silver Star | 1992 | Sega CD | Lunar Legend | 2002 | GBA | Remake | |
| Lunar: The Silver Star | 1992 | Sega CD | Lunar: Silver Star Harmony | 2009 | PSP | Remake | |
| Lunar: Eternal Blue | 1994 | Sega CD | Lunar 2: Eternal Blue Complete | 1998 | Saturn, PS1 | Remake | |
| Lunar: Silver Star Story Complete | 1996 | Saturn, PS1, Windows, iOS, Android | Lunar Remastered Collection | 2025 | Switch, PS4, Xbox One, Windows | Remasters | |
| Lunar 2: Eternal Blue Complete | 1998 | PS1, Saturn | Lunar Remastered Collection | 2025 | Switch, PS4, Xbox One, Windows | Remasters | |
| Lunar: Sanposuru Gakuen | 1996 | Game Gear | Mahō Gakuen Lunar! | 1997 | Saturn | Remake | |
| Mafia | 2002 | Windows, Xbox, PS2 | Mafia: Definitive Edition | 2020 | Xbox One, PS4, Windows | Remake | |
| Mafia II | 2010 | Xbox 360, PS3, Windows | Mafia II: Definitive Edition | 2020 | Xbox One, PS4, Windows | Remaster | |
| Mario vs. Donkey Kong | 2004 | GBA | Mario vs. Donkey Kong | 2024 | Switch | Remake | |
| Mario & Luigi: Bowser's Inside Story | 2009 | DS | Mario & Luigi: Bowser's Inside Story + Bowser Jr's Journey | 2018 | 3DS | Remake | |
| Mario & Luigi: Superstar Saga | 2003 | GBA | Mario & Luigi: Superstar Saga + Bowser's Minions | 2017 | 3DS | Remake | |
| Mario Bros. | 1983 | Arcade | Kaettekita Mario Bros | 1988 | NES | Remake | |
| Mario Bros. | 1983 | Arcade | Super Mario Advance | 2001 | GBA | Remake | |
| Marvel's Spider-Man | 2018 | PS4 | Marvel's Spider-Man Remastered | 2020 | PS5, Windows | Remaster | |
| Mario Power Tennis | 2004 | GC | New Play Control! Mario Power Tennis | 2009 | Wii | Remake | |
| Mass Effect | 2007 | Windows, PS3, Xbox 360 | Mass Effect Legendary Edition | 2021 | Windows, PS4, Xbox One | Remake | |
| Mass Effect 2 | 2010 | Windows, PS3, Xbox 360 | Mass Effect Legendary Edition | 2021 | Windows, PS4, Xbox One | Remaster | |
| Mass Effect 3 | 2012 | Windows, PS3, Wii U, Xbox 360 | Mass Effect Legendary Edition | 2021 | Windows, PS4, Xbox One | Remaster | |
| MediEvil | 1998 | PS1 | MediEvil | 2019 | PS4 | Remake | |
| Mega Man | 1987 | NES | Mega Man Powered Up | 2006 | PSP | Remake | |
| Mega Man | 1987 | NES | Mega Man: The Wily Wars | 1994 | Genesis | Remakes | |
| Mega Man 2 | 1988 | NES | Mega Man: The Wily Wars | 1994 | Genesis | Remakes | |
| Mega Man 3 | 1990 | NES | Mega Man: The Wily Wars | 1994 | Genesis | Remakes | |
| Mega Man X | 1993 | SNES | Mega Man Maverick Hunter X | 2005 | PSP | Remake | |
| Metal Gear Solid | 1998 | PS1 | Metal Gear Solid: The Twin Snakes | 2004 | GC | Remake | |
| Metal Gear Solid 2: Sons of Liberty | 2001 | PS2 | Metal Gear Solid HD Collection | 2011 | PS3, Xbox 360, PSV | Remasters | |
| Metal Gear Solid 3: Snake Eater | 2004 | PS2 | Metal Gear Solid HD Collection | 2011 | PS3, Xbox 360, PSV | Remasters | |
| Metal Gear Solid: Peace Walker | 2010 | PSP | Metal Gear Solid HD Collection | 2011 | PS3, Xbox 360, PSV | Remasters | |
| Metal Gear Solid 3: Snake Eater | 2004 | PS2 | Metal Gear Solid Delta: Snake Eater | 2025 | Windows, PS5, Xbox Series X/S | Remake | |
| Metro 2033 | 2010 | Xbox 360, Windows | Metro 2033 Redux | 2014 | Windows, OS X, Ps4, Xbox One, Linux, Switch, Stadia | Remaster | |
| Metro: Last Light | 2013 | Xbox 360, Windows, PS3 | Metro: Last Light Redux | 2014 | Windows, OS X, Ps4, Xbox One, Linux, Switch, Stadia | Remaster | |
| Metroid | 1986 | NES | Metroid: Zero Mission | 2004 | GBA | Remake | |
| Metroid II: Return of Samus | 1991 | GB | Metroid: Samus Returns | 2017 | 3DS | Remake | |
| Metroid Prime | 2002 | GC | Metroid Prime Remastered | 2023 | Switch | Remaster | |
| Missile Command | 1980 | Arcade, Atari 2600, Atari 5200, Atari 8-bit, Lynx, Atari ST, GB | Missile Command 3D | 1995 | Atari Jaguar | Remake | |
| Missile Command | 1980 | Arcade, Atari 2600, Atari 5200, Atari 8-bit, Lynx, Atari ST, GB | Missile Command | 1999 | Windows, PS1 | Remake | |
| Missile Command | 1980 | Arcade, Atari 2600, Atari 5200, Atari 8-bit, Lynx, Atari ST, GB | Missile Command: Recharged | 2020 | Android, Atari VCS, Intellivision Amico, iOS, Switch | Remake | |
| Monkey Island 2: LeChuck's Revenge | 1991 | Amiga, FM Towns, Mac OS, MS-DOS | Monkey Island 2 Special Edition: LeChuck's Revenge | 2010 | PS3, iOS, Windows, Xbox 360 | Remake | |
| Monster Rancher | 1997 | PS1 | Monster Rancher 1 & 2 DX | 2021 | iOS, Switch, Windows | Remasters | |
| Monster Rancher 2 | 1999 | PS1 | Monster Rancher 1 & 2 DX | 2021 | iOS, Switch, Windows | Remasters | |
| Monster World IV | 1994 | Genesis | Wonder Boy: Asha in Monster World | 2021 | PS4, Switch, Windows | Remake | |
| Myst | 1993 | Macintosh | Myst: Masterpiece Edition | 1999 | Windows, Mac OS X | Remaster | |
| Myst | 1993 | Macintosh | realMyst: Interactive 3D Edition | 2000 | Windows, Mac OS X | Remake | |
| Myst | 1993 | Macintosh | realMyst: Masterpiece Edition | 2014 | Windows, OS X | Remake | |
| Myst | 1993 | Macintosh | Myst | 2020 | Windows, macOS, Xbox One, Oculus Quest, Oculus Quest 2, Xbox Series X/S, iOS | Remake | |
| Nancy Drew: Secrets Can Kill | 1998 | Windows | Nancy Drew: Secrets Can Kill Remastered | 2010 | Windows | Remaster | |
| Naruto: Ultimate Ninja Storm | 2008 | PlayStation 3 | Naruto Shippuden: Ultimate Ninja Storm Trilogy | 2017 | Windows, PS4, Xbox One, Switch | Remasters | |
| Naruto Shippuden: Ultimate Ninja Storm 2 | 2010 | PlayStation 3, Xbox 360 | Naruto Shippuden: Ultimate Ninja Storm Trilogy | 2017 | Windows, PS4, Xbox One, Switch | Remasters | |
| Naruto Shippuden: Ultimate Ninja Storm 3 Full Burst | 2013 | PlayStation 3, Xbox 360, Windows | Naruto Shippuden: Ultimate Ninja Storm Trilogy | 2017 | Windows, PS4, Xbox One, Switch | Remasters | |
| Need for Speed: Hot Pursuit | 2010 | Windows, Xbox 360, PlayStation 3 | Need for Speed: Hot Pursuit Remastered | 2020 | Windows, PlayStation 4, Xbox One, Nintendo Switch | Remaster | |
| Neighbours from Hell | 2003 | Windows, Xbox, GC, DS | Neighbours back From Hell | 2020 | Windows, Xbox One, PS4, Switch | Remakes | |
| Neighbours from Hell 2: On Vacation | 2004 | Windows, Xbox, GC | Neighbours back From Hell | 2020 | Windows, Xbox One, PS4, Switch | Remakes | |
| Nemesis 2 | 1987 | MSX | Nemesis '90 Kai | 1993 | X68000 | Remake | |
| New Super Luigi U | 2013 | Wii U | New Super Mario Bros. U Deluxe | 2019 | Switch | Remasters | |
| New Super Mario Bros. U | 2012 | Wii U | New Super Mario Bros. U Deluxe | 2019 | Switch | Remasters | |
| No More Heroes | 2007 | Wii | No More Heroes: Heroes' Paradise | 2010 | PS3, Xbox 360 | Remake | |
| NieR Replicant | 2010 | PS3, Xbox 360 | Nier Replicant ver.1.22474487139… | 2021 | Windows, PS4, Xbox One | Remaster | |
| Nights into Dreams | 1996 | Saturn | Nights into Dreams | 2008 | PS2 | Remake | |
| Nights into Dreams | 1996 | Saturn | SEGA Heritage Collection | 2012 | Windows, PS3, Xbox 360 | Remake | |
| Ni no Kuni: Wrath of the White Witch | 2011 | PS3, Switch | Ni no Kuni: Wrath of the White Witch Remastered | 2019 | PS4, Windows | Remaster | |
| Ninja Gaiden Black | 2005 | Xbox | Ninja Gaiden Sigma | 2007 | PS3, Windows | Remake | |
| Ninja Gaiden II | 2008 | Xbox 360 | Ninja Gaiden Sigma 2 | 2009 | PS3, Windows | Remake | |
| The Ninja Warriors | 1994 | SNES | The Ninja Warriors: Return of the Warriors | 2019 | Windows, PS4, Switch | Remake | |
| Oddworld: Abe's Oddysee | 1997 | PS1, Windows, DOS | Oddworld: New 'n' Tasty! | 2014 | PS4, Linux, Windows, OS X, Xbox One, PS3, PSV, Wii U | Remake | |
| Oddworld: Abe's Exoddus | 1998 | PS1, Windows | Oddworld: Soulstorm | 2021 | Windows, PS4, PS5 | Remake | |
| Oddworld: Munch's Oddysee | 2001 | Xbox | Oddworld: Munch's Oddysee HD | 2012 | PS3, PSV | Remaster | |
| Oddworld: Stranger's Wrath | 2005 | Xbox | Oddworld: Stranger's Wrath HD | 2011 | PS3, PSV, Windows | Remaster | |
| Odin Sphere | 2007 | PS2 | Odin Sphere Leifthrasir | 2016 | PS3, PSV, PS4 | Remake | |
| Ōkami | 2006 | PS2 | Ōkami HD | 2012 | PS3, Windows, PS4, Xbox One, Switch | Remaster | |
| Onimusha: Warlords | 2001 | PlayStation 2 | Onimusha: Warlords | 2019 | PS4, Xbox One, Switch, Windows | Remaster | |
| Outcast | 1999 | Windows | Outcast 1.1 | 2014 | Windows | Remaster | |
| Outcast | 1999 | Windows | Outcast: Second Contact | 2017 | Windows, PS4, Xbox One | Remake | |
| Pac-Man World | 1999 | PlayStation | Pac-Man World: Re-Pac | 2022 | Windows, Switch, PS4, PS5, Xbox One, Xbox Series X/S | Remaster | |
| Paper Mario: The Thousand-Year Door | 2004 | GC | Paper Mario: The Thousand-Year Door | 2024 | Switch | Remake | |
| Parappa the Rapper | 1996 | PS1, PSP | PaRappa the Rapper Remastered | 2017 | PS4 | Remaster | |
| Panzer Dragoon | 1995 | Sega Saturn | Panzer Dragoon: Remake | 2020 | Switch, PS4, Xbox One, Stadia, Windows | Remake | |
| Panzer Dragoon II Zwei | 1996 | Sega Saturn | Panzer Dragoon Zwei: Remake | TBA | Windows, PS4, Switch | Remake | |
| Perfect Dark | 2000 | Nintendo 64 | Perfect Dark | 2010 | Xbox 360, Xbox One | Remake | |
| Revelations: Persona | 1996 | PS1 | Shin Megami Tensei: Persona | 2009 | PSP, PSV | Remake | |
| Persona 2: Innocent Sin | 1999 | PS1 | Persona 2: Innocent Sin | 2011 | PSP, PSV | Remake | |
| Persona 2: Eternal Punishment | 2000 | PS1 | Persona 2: Eternal Punishment | 2012 | PSP, PSV | Remake | |
| Persona 3 | 2006 | PS2 | Persona 3 Portable | 2009 | PSP, PSV, Switch, PS4, Windows, Xbox One, Xbox Series X/S | Remaster | |
| Persona 3 | 2006 | PS2 | Persona 3 Reload | 2024 | PS4, PS5, Windows, Xbox One, Xbox Series X/S | Remake | |
| Persona 4 | 2008 | PlayStation 2 | Persona 4 Golden | 2012 | PSV, Windows, PS4, PS5, Xbox One, Xbox Series X/S, Nintendo Switch | Remaster | |
| Persona 4 | 2008 | PlayStation 2 | Persona 4 Revival | 2027 | Windows, PS5, Xbox Series X/S, Switch 2 | Remake | |
| Persona 5 | 2016 | PS3, PS4 | Persona 5 Royal | 2019 | Windows, PS4, PS5, Xbox One, Xbox Series X/S, Switch | Remaster | |
| Phantasy Star | 1987 | Master System | Sega Ages 2500 Vol. 1: Phantasy Star Generation: 1 | 2003 | PS2 | Remakes | |
| Phantasy Star II | 1989 | Sega Genesis | Sega Ages 2500 Vol. 17: Phantasy Star Generation: 2 | 2005 | PS2 | Remakes | |
| Phantasy Star IV | 1993 | Sega Genesis | Sega Ages 2500 Vol. 32: Phantasy Star Complete Collection | 2008 | PS2 | Remakes | |
| Pharaoh | 1999 | Windows | Pharaoh: A New Era | 2023 | Windows | Remake | |
| Phoenix Wright: Ace Attorney | 2001 | GBA, Windows, DS, Wii | Phoenix Wright: Ace Attorney Trilogy | 2012 | iOS, Android, 3DS, Switch, PS4, Windows, Xbox One | Remasters | |
| Phoenix Wright: Ace Attorney − Justice for All | 2002 | GBA, Windows, DS, Wii | Phoenix Wright: Ace Attorney Trilogy | 2012 | iOS, Android, 3DS, Switch, PS4, Windows, Xbox One | Remasters | |
| Phoenix Wright: Ace Attorney − Trials and Tribulations | 2004 | GBA, Windows, DS, Wii | Phoenix Wright: Ace Attorney Trilogy | 2012 | iOS, Android, 3DS, Switch, PS4, Windows, Xbox One | Remasters | |
| Pikmin | 2001 | GC | New Play Control! Pikmin | 2008 | Wii | Remakes | |
| Pikmin 2 | 2004 | GC | New Play Control! Pikmin 2 | 2009 | Wii | Remakes | |
| Pikmin | 2001 | GC | Pikmin 1 + Pikmin 2 | 2023 | Switch | Remasters | |
| Pikmin 2 | 2004 | GC | Pikmin 1 + Pikmin 2 | 2023 | Switch | Remasters | |
| Planescape: Torment | 1999 | Windows | Planescape: Torment – Enhanced Edition | 2017 | Android, iOS, Linux, macOS, Windows, Switch, PS4, Xbox One | Remaster | |
| PO'ed | 1995 | 3DO, PS1 | PO'ed: Definitive Edition | 2024 | Switch, PS4, PS5, Windows, Xbox One, Xbox Series X/S | Remaster | |
| Pokémon Diamond and Pearl | 2006 | DS | Pokémon Brilliant Diamond and Shining Pearl | 2021 | Switch | Remake | |
| Pokémon Gold and Silver | 1999 | GBC | Pokémon HeartGold and SoulSilver | 2009 | DS | Remakes | |
| Pokémon Red and Blue | 1996 | GB | Pokémon FireRed and LeafGreen | 2004 | GBA | Remakes | |
| Pokémon Yellow | 1998 | GB | Pokémon: Let's Go, Pikachu! and Let's Go, Eevee! | 2018 | Switch | Remakes | |
| Pokémon Ruby and Sapphire | 2002 | GBA | Pokémon Omega Ruby and Alpha Sapphire | 2014 | 3DS | Remakes | |
| Pokémon Mystery Dungeon: Blue Rescue Team | 2005 | DS | Pokémon Mystery Dungeon: Rescue Team DX | 2020 | Switch | Remakes | |
| Pokémon Mystery Dungeon: Red Rescue Team | 2005 | GBA | Pokémon Mystery Dungeon: Rescue Team DX | 2020 | Switch | Remakes | |
| Police Quest: In Pursuit of the Death Angel | 1987 | DOS, Apple II, Amiga, Atari ST, Apple IIGS | Police Quest: In Pursuit of the Death Angel | 1992 | DOS | Remake | |
| Postal | 1997 | Mac OS, Windows, Linux | Postal: Redux | 2014 | Windows, Switch | Remaster | |
| PowerSlave | 1996 | Saturn, PS1, DOS | PowerSlave Exhumed | 2022 | Windows, PS4, Xbox One, Xbox Series X/S, Switch | Remaster | |
| Praetorians | 2003 | Windows | Praetorians: HD Remaster | 2020 | Windows | Remaster | |
| Prince of Persia | 1989 | Apple II | Prince of Persia Classic | 2007 | Xbox 360, PS 3 | Remake | |
| Prince of Persia: The Sands of Time | 2003 | PS2, Xbox, GC, Windows | Prince of Persia Trilogy | 2010 | PS3 | Remasters | |
| Prince of Persia: Warrior Within | 2004 | PS2, Xbox, GC, Windows | Prince of Persia Trilogy | 2010 | PS3 | Remasters | |
| Prince of Persia: The Two Thrones | 2005 | PS2, Xbox, GC, Windows | Prince of Persia Trilogy | 2010 | PS3 | Remasters | |
| Quake | 1996 | MS-DOS, Linux, Classic Mac OS, Saturn, N64 | Quake Remastered | 2021 | Windows, Switch, PS4, Xbox One, PS5, Xbox Series X/S | Remaster | |
| Quake II | 1997 | Windows | Quake II Remastered | 2023 | Windows, Switch, PS4, Xbox One, PS5, Xbox Series X/S | Remaster | |
| Quest for Glory: So You Want to Be a Hero | 1989 | Amiga, Atari ST, MS-DOS, PC-98 | Quest for Glory I: So You Want To Be A Hero | 1992 | MS-DOS, Classic Mac OS | Remake | |
| Quest for Glory II: Trial By Fire | 1990 | Amiga, Atari ST, MS-DOS | Quest for Glory II Remake | 2008 | Windows, OS X | Remake | |
| R-Type | 1987 | Amiga, CPC, Arcade, Atari ST, C64, GB, Master System, MSX, PC-88, TurboGrafx-16, X68000, ZX Spectrum | R-Type Dimensions | 2009 | Windows, Switch, PS3, PS4, Xbox 360 | Remake | |
| Radiant Silvergun | 1998 | Arcade | Radiant Silvergun | 2011 | Xbox 360 | Remaster | |
| Ratchet & Clank | 2002 | PS2 | Ratchet & Clank Collection | 2012 | PS3, PSV | Remasters | |
| Ratchet & Clank: Going Commando | 2003 | PS2 | Ratchet & Clank Collection | 2012 | PS3, PSV | Remasters | |
| Ratchet & Clank: Up Your Arsenal | 2004 | PS2 | Ratchet & Clank Collection | 2012 | PS3, PSV | Remasters | |
| Ratchet & Clank | 2002 | PS2 | Ratchet & Clank | 2016 | PS4 | Remake | |
| Rayman 3: Hoodlum Havoc | 2003 | GC, PS2, Xbox, Windows | Rayman 3 HD | 2012 | PS3, Xbox 360 | Remaster | |
| Rayman Legends | 2013 | Wii U, Switch, PS3, PS4, Xbox 360, Xbox One, PC | Rayman Legends Retold | 2026 | Switch 2, PS5, Xbox Series X, PC | Remake | |
| Realms of Arkania: Blade of Destiny | 1992 | Amiga, MS-DOS | Realms of Arkania: Blade of Destiny | 2013 | Windows | Remake | |
| Resident Evil | 1996 | PS1, Windows, Saturn | Resident Evil | 2002 | GC | Remake | |
| Resident Evil | 1996 | PS1, Windows, Saturn | Resident Evil: Deadly Silence | 2006 | DS | Remake | |
| Resident Evil 2 | 1998 | PS1, Windows, Dreamcast, GC | Resident Evil 2 | 2019 | PS4, Xbox One, Windows, PS5, Xbox Series X/S | Remake | |
| Resident Evil 3: Nemesis | 1999 | PS1, Windows, Dreamcast, GC | Resident Evil 3 | 2020 | PS4, Xbox One, Windows, PS5, Xbox Series X/S | Remake | |
| Resident Evil – Code: Veronica | 2000 | Dreamcast, PS2, GC | Resident Evil: Code Veronica X HD | 2011 | PS3, Xbox 360 | Remake | |
| Resident Evil – Code: Veronica | 2000 | Dreamcast, PS2, GC | Resident Evil Veronica | 2027 | Switch 2, PS5, Windows, Xbox Series X/S | Remake | |
| Resident Evil | 2002 | GC, Wii | Resident Evil HD | 2015 | PS3, PS4, Windows, Xbox 360, Xbox One, Switch | Remake | |
| Resident Evil Zero | 2002 | GC, Wii | Resident Evil 0 | 2016 | PS3, PS4, Windows, Xbox 360, Xbox One, Switch | Remaster | |
| Resident Evil 4 | 2005 | GC, PS2, Windows, Wii | Resident Evil 4 HD | 2011 | PS3, Xbox 360, PS4, Xbox One, Switch | Remaster | |
| Resident Evil 4 | 2005 | GC, PS2, Windows, Wii | Resident Evil 4 Ultimate HD Edition | 2014 | Windows | Remaster | |
| Resident Evil 4 | 2005 | GC, PS2, Windows, Wii | Resident Evil 4 | 2023 | PS5, Xbox Series X/S, Windows | Remake | |
| Resident Evil: The Umbrella Chronicles | 2007 | Wii | Resident Evil Chronicles HD Collection | 2012 | PS3 | Remasters | |
| Resident Evil: The Darkside Chronicles | 2009 | Wii | Resident Evil Chronicles HD Collection | 2012 | PS3 | Remasters | |
| Resonance of Fate | 2010 | PS3, Xbox 360 | Resonance of Fate 4K/HD Edition | 2018 | PS4, Windows | Remaster | |
| Rez | 2001 | Dreamcast, PS2 | Rez HD | 2008 | Xbox 360 | Remaster | |
| Rez | 2001 | Dreamcast, PS2 | Rez Infinite | 2016 | PS4, PSVR, Windows | Remaster | |
| Rise of the Triad: Dark War | 1995 | MS-DOS | Rise of the Triad: Ludicrous Edition | 2023 | Windows, Switch, PS4, PS5, Xbox One, Xbox Series X/S | Remaster | |
| Rise of the Triad: Dark War | 1995 | MS-DOS | Rise of the Triad | 2013 | Windows | Remake | |
| Riven | 1997 | Mac OS X, Windows | Riven | 2024 | Windows, macOS, Meta Quest | Remake | |
| River City Ransom | 1989 | NES | River City Ransom EX | 2004 | GBA | Remake | |
| Rogue Trooper | 2006 | Windows, PS2, Xbox | Rogue Trooper Redux | 2017 | Windows, PS4, Xbox One, Switch | Remaster | |
| Romancing SaGa | 1992 | SNES | Romancing SaGa: Minstrel Song | 2005 | PS2 | Remake | |
| Romancing SaGa 2 | 1993 | SNES | Romancing SaGa 2 | 2016 | Android, iOS, Windows, Switch, PS4, PSV, Xbox One | Remaster | |
| Romancing SaGa 3 | 1995 | SNES | Romancing SaGa 3 | 2019 | Android, iOS, Windows, Switch, PS4, PSV, Xbox One | Remaster | |
| Romancing SaGa: Minstrel Song | 2005 | PS2 | Romancing SaGa: Minstrel Song Remastered | 2022 | Android, iOS, Switch, PS4, PS5, Windows | Remaster | |
| Rome: Total War | 2004 | Windows | Total War: Rome Remastered | 2021 | Linux, MacOS, Windows | Remaster | |
| Rygar | 1986 | Arcade | Rygar: The Legendary Adventure | 2002 | PS2, Wii | Remake | |
| Ryū ga Gotoku Ishin! | 2014 | PS3, PS4 | Like a Dragon: Ishin! | 2023 | Windows, PS4, PS5, Xbox One, Xbox Series X/S | Remake | |
| SaGa Frontier | 1997 | PS1 | SaGa Frontier Remastered | 2021 | Android, iOS, Switch, PS4, Windows | Remaster | |
| Sam & Max Save the World | 2006 | Windows, Wii, Xbox 360 | Sam & Max Save the World Remastered | 2020 | Windows, Switch, PS4, Xbox One | Remasters | |
| Sam & Max Beyond Time and Space | 2007 | Windows, OS X, Xbox 360, PS3, Wii, iOS | Sam & Max Beyond Time and Space Remastered | 2021 | Windows, Switch, PS4, Xbox One | Remasters | |
| Sam & Max: The Devil's Playhouse | 2010 | Windows, OS X, PS3, iOS | Sam & Max: The Devil's Playhouse Remastered | 2024 | Windows, Switch, PS4, Xbox One | Remasters | |
| Secret of Mana | 1993 | SNES | Secret of Mana | 2018 | Windows, PS4, PSV | Remake | |
| The Secret of Monkey Island | 1990 | Amiga, Atari ST, MS-DOS, FM Towns, Classic Mac OS, Sega CD | The Secret of Monkey Island: Special Edition | 2009 | Windows, Xbox 360, iOS | Remake | |
| Sensible World of Soccer '96/'97 | 1996 | Windows, Amiga | Sensible World of Soccer | 2007 | Xbox 360 | Remake | |
| Serious Sam: The First Encounter | 2001 | Windows | Serious Sam HD: The First Encounter | 2009 | Windows, Xbox 360, Linux | Remakes | |
| Serious Sam: The Second Encounter | 2002 | Windows | Serious Sam HD: The Second Encounter | 2010 | Windows, Xbox 360, Linux | Remakes | |
| The Settlers II | 1996 | MS-DOS | The Settlers II (10th Anniversary) | 2006 | Windows | Remake | |
| Shadow Man | 1999 | Windows, N64, PS1, Dreamcast | Shadow Man Remastered | 2021 | Windows, Switch, PS4, Xbox One | Remaster | |
| Shadow of the Beast | 1989 | Amiga, Atari ST, CPC, C64, ZX Spectrum, SNES, Genesis, Master System, Lynx, FM Towns, TurboGrafx-CD | Shadow of the Beast | 2016 | PlayStation 4 | Remake | |
| Shadow of the Colossus | 2005 | PS2 | The Ico & Shadow of the Colossus Collection | 2011 | PS3 | Remasters | |
| Shadow of the Colossus | 2005 | PS2 | Shadow of the Colossus | 2018 | PS4 | Remake | |
| Shadow of the Ninja | 1990 | NES | Shadow of the Ninja Reborn | 2024 | PS5, Switch, PS4, Xbox Series X/S, Windows | Remake | |
| Shadow Warrior | 1997 | MS-DOS | Shadow Warrior Classic Redux | 2013 | Windows, OS X, Linux | Remaster | |
| Shenmue | 1999 | Dreamcast | Shenmue I & II | 2018 | Windows, PS4, Xbox One | Remasters | |
| Shenmue II | 2001 | Dreamcast, Xbox | Shenmue I & II | 2018 | Windows, PS4, Xbox One | Remasters | |
| Shining Force | 1992 | Genesis | Shining Force: Resurrection of the Dark Dragon | 2004 | GBA, iOS | Remake | |
| Shin Megami Tensei III: Nocturne | 2003 | PS2 | Shin Megami Tensei III: Nocturne HD Remaster | 2020 | Windows, PS4, Switch | Remaster | |
| Sid Meier's Pirates! | 1987 | C64 | Sid Meier's Pirates! | 2004 | Windows, Xbox, Xbox 360, PSP, Mac OS X, Linux, Wii, iOS, Windows Phone | Remake | |
| Silent Hill | 1999 | PS1 | Silent Hill | TBA | TBA | Remake | |
| Silent Hill 2 | 2001 | PS2 | Silent Hill HD Collection | 2012 | PS3, Xbox 360 | Remasters | |
| Silent Hill 3 | 2003 | PS2 | Silent Hill HD Collection | 2012 | PS3, Xbox 360 | Remasters | |
| Silent Hill 2 | 2001 | PS2 | Silent Hill 2 | 2024 | Windows, PS5 | Remake | |
| SiN | 1998 | Windows, Linux, Classic Mac OS | SiN: Reloaded | TBA | Windows | Remaster | |
| Sleeping Dogs | 2012 | Windows, PS3, Xbox 360 | Sleeping Dogs: Definitive Edition | 2014 | Windows, PS4, Xbox One | Remaster | |
| Sly Cooper and the Thievius Raccoonus | 2002 | PS2 | The Sly Collection | 2010 | PS3 | Remasters | |
| Sly 2: Band of Thieves | 2004 | PS2 | The Sly Collection | 2010 | PS3 | Remasters | |
| Sly 3: Honor Among Thieves | 2005 | PS2 | The Sly Collection | 2010 | PS3 | Remasters | |
| Sonic CD | 1993 | Sega CD | Sonic Origins | 2022 | PS4, PS5, Windows, Xbox One, Xbox Series X/S | Remaster | |
| Sonic Colors | 2010 | Wii | Sonic Colors Ultimate | 2021 | Windows, PS4, Xbox One, Switch | Remaster | |
| Sonic Generations | 2011 | Xbox 360, Windows, PS3 | Sonic X Shadow Generations | 2024 | Switch, Xbox One, PS4, Windows, PS5, Xbox Series X/S | Remaster | |
| Sonic the Hedgehog | 1991 | Genesis | Sonic the Hedgehog | 2013 | iOS, Android | Remaster | |
| Sonic the Hedgehog | 1991 | Genesis | Sonic Origins | 2022 | Windows, Nintendo Switch, PlayStation 4, PlayStation 5, Xbox One, Xbox Series X/S | Remaster | |
| Sonic the Hedgehog 2 | 1992 | Genesis | Sonic the Hedgehog 2 | 2013 | iOS, Android | Remaster | |
| Sonic the Hedgehog 2 | 1992 | Genesis | Sonic Origins | 2022 | Windows, Nintendo Switch, PlayStation 4, PlayStation 5, Xbox One, Xbox Series X/S | Remaster | |
| Sonic the Hedgehog 3 & Knuckles | 1994 | Genesis | Sonic Origins | 2022 | Windows, Nintendo Switch, PlayStation 4, PlayStation 5, Xbox One, Xbox Series X/S | Remaster | |
| Soulcalibur II | 2002 | Arcade, PS2, GC, Xbox | Soucalibur II HD Online | 2013 | PS3, Xbox | Remaster | |
| Space Harrier | 1986 | Arcade | Sega Classics Collection | 2005 | PS2 | Remake | |
| Space Quest I | 1986 | DOS, Macintosh, Apple II, Apple IIGS, Amiga, Atari ST | Space Quest I: Roger Wilco in the Sarien Encounter | 1991 | Amiga, DOS, Classic Mac OS | Remake | |
| Space Quest II | 1987 | DOS, Macintosh, Apple II, Apple IIGS, Amiga, Atari ST | Space Quest II: Roger Wilco in Vohaul's Revenge | 2011 | Windows, OS X | Remake | |
| Space Rangers 2: Dominators | 2005 | Windows | Space Rangers HD: A War Apart | 2013 | Windows | Remake | |
| Spelunker | 1985 | NES | Spelunker HD | 2009 | PS3 | Remake | |
| Sphinx and the Cursed Mummy | 2003 | PS2, Xbox, GC | Sphinx and the Cursed Mummy | 2017 | Windows, macOS, Linux, Switch | Remaster | |
| SpongeBob SquarePants: Battle for Bikini Bottom | 2003 | PS2, Xbox, GC | SpongeBob SquarePants: Battle for Bikini Bottom – Rehydrated | 2020 | Windows, Switch, PS4, Xbox One | Remake | |
| Tom Clancy's Splinter Cell | 2002 | Xbox, Windows, PS2, GC | Tom Clancy's Splinter Cell: Classic Trilogy HD | 2011 | PS3 | Remasters | |
| Tom Clancy's Splinter Cell: Pandora Tomorrow | 2004 | Xbox, Windows, PS2, GC | Tom Clancy's Splinter Cell: Classic Trilogy HD | 2011 | PS3 | Remasters | |
| Tom Clancy's Splinter Cell: Chaos Theory | 2005 | Xbox, Windows, PS2, GC | Tom Clancy's Splinter Cell: Classic Trilogy HD | 2011 | PS3 | Remasters | |
| Tom Clancy's Splinter Cell | 2002 | Xbox, Windows, PS2, GC | Tom Clancy's Splinter Cell: Remake | TBA | TBA | Remake | |
| Spy Hunter | 1983 | Arcade | Spy Hunter | 2001 | PS2 | Remake | |
| Spyro the Dragon | 1998 | PS1 | Spyro Reignited Trilogy | 2018 | PS4, Xbox One, Switch, Windows | Remasters | |
| Spyro 2: Ripto's Rage! | 1999 | PS1 | Spyro Reignited Trilogy | 2018 | PS4, Xbox One, Switch, Windows | Remasters | |
| Spyro: Year of the Dragon | 2000 | PS1 | Spyro Reignited Trilogy | 2018 | PS4, Xbox One, Switch, Windows | Remasters | |
| Star Control II | 1992 | MS-DOS | The Ur-Quan Masters | 2002 | Windows, OS X, Linux | Remake | |
| Star Fox 64 | 1997 | N64 | Star Fox 64 3D | 2011 | 3DS | Remakes | |
| Star Fox 64 | 1997 | N64 | Star Fox | 2026 | Switch 2 | Remakes | |
| Star Ocean | 1996 | SNES | Star Ocean: First Departure | 2007 | PSP | Remake | |
| Star Ocean | 1996 | SNES | Star Ocean: First Departure R | 2019 | PS4, Switch | Remake | |
| Star Ocean: The Second Story | 1998 | PlayStation | Star Ocean: The Second Evolution | 2008 | PSP | Remake | |
| Star Ocean: The Second Story | 1998 | PlayStation | Star Ocean: The Second Story R | 2023 | Switch, PS4, PS5, Windows | Remake | |
| Star Ocean: The Last Hope | 2009 | Xbox 360 | Star Ocean: The Last Hope – 4K & Full HD Remaster | 2017 | Windows, PS4 | Remaster | |
| StarCraft | 1998 | Windows | StarCraft: Remastered | 2017 | Windows, macOS | Remaster | |
| Street Fighter III: 3rd Strike | 1999 | Arcade | Street Fighter III: 3rd Strike Online Edition | 2011 | PS3, Xbox 360 | Remake | |
| Strider | 1989 | Arcade | Strider | 2014 | PS3, Xbox 360, Windows | Remake | |
| Strife | 1996 | Windows | Strife: Veteran Edition | 2014 | Windows | Remaster | |
| Suikoden I & II | 2006 | PSP | Suikoden I & II HD Remaster: Gate Rune and Dunan Unification Wars | 2025 | Switch, PS4, Windows, Xbox One | Remaster | |
| Super Mario 64 | 1996 | N64 | Super Mario 64 DS | 2004 | DS | Remake | |
| Super Mario 64 | 1996 | N64 | Super Mario 3D All-Stars | 2020 | Switch | Remaster | |
| Super Mario Bros. | 1985 | NES | Super Mario All-Stars | 1993 | SNES | Remake | |
| Super Mario Bros. 2 | 1988 | NES | Super Mario All-Stars | 1993 | SNES | Remake | |
| Super Mario Bros. 2 | 1988 | NES | Super Mario Advance | 2001 | GBA | Remake | |
| Super Mario Bros.: The Lost Levels | 1986 | NES | Super Mario All-Stars | 1993 | SNES | Remake | |
| Super Mario Bros. 3 | 1988 | NES | Super Mario All-Stars | 1993 | SNES | Remake | |
| Super Mario Bros. 3 | 1988 | NES | Super Mario Advance 4: Super Mario Bros. 3 | 2003 | GBA | Remake | |
| Super Mario RPG: Legend of the Seven Stars | 1996 | SNES | Super Mario RPG | 2023 | Switch | Remake | |
| Super Mario Sunshine | 2002 | GC | Super Mario 3D All-Stars | 2020 | Switch | Remaster | |
| Super Mario Galaxy | 2007 | Wii | Super Mario 3D All-Stars | 2020 | Switch | Remaster | |
| Super Monkey Ball: Banana Blitz | 2006 | Wii | Super Monkey Ball: Banana Blitz HD | 2019 | Switch, PS4, Xbox One, Windows | Remaster | |
| Super Robot Taisen: Original Generation | 2002 | PS2 | Super Robot Wars: Original Generations | 2007 | PS2 | Remakes | |
| Super Robot Taisen: Original Generation 2 | 2005 | PS2 | Super Robot Wars: Original Generations | 2007 | PS2 | Remakes | |
| Super Street Fighter II Turbo | 1994 | Arcade | Super Street Fighter II Turbo Revival | 2001 | GBA | Remake | |
| Super Street Fighter II Turbo | 1994 | Arcade | Super Street Fighter II Turbo HD Remix | 2008 | PS3, Xbox 360 | Remake | |
| Superfrog | 1993 | Amiga | Superfrog HD | 2013 | PS3, PSV, Windows, OS X, Linux, Android, iOS | Remake | |
| System Shock | 1994 | MS-DOS, Mac OS | System Shock | 2023 | PS5, Xbox Series X/S, Windows, PS4, Xbox One, Linux, macOS | Remake | |
| System Shock 2 | 1999 | Windows | System Shock 2: 25th Anniversary Remaster | 2025 | PS5, Xbox Series X/S, Windows, PS4, Xbox One, Linux, macOS | Remaster | |
| Tactics Ogre: Let Us Cling Together | 1995 | SNES | Tactics Ogre: Let Us Cling Together | 2011 | PSP | Remake | |
| Tales of Phantasia | 1995 | SNES | Tales of Phantasia | 1998 | PS1 | Remake | |
| Tales of Phantasia | 1995 | SNES | Tales of Phantasia Full Voice Edition | 2006 | PSP | Remake | |
| Tales of Destiny | 1997 | PlayStation | Tales of Destiny | 2006 | PS2 | Remakes | |
| Tales of Destiny | 1997 | PlayStation | Tales of Destiny Director's Cut | 2008 | PS2 | Remakes | |
| Tales of Graces f | 2010 | PS3 | Tales of Graces f Remastered | 2025 | Switch, PS4, PS5, Xbox One, Xbox Series X/S, Windows | Remaster | |
| Tales of Symphonia | 2003 | GC | Tales of Symphonia: Chronicles | 2013 | PS3 | Remaster | |
| Tales of Vesperia | 2008 | PlayStation 3, Xbox 360 | Tales of Vesperia: Definitive Edition | 2019 | PS4, Xbox One, Switch, Windows | Remaster | |
| Tales of the Abyss | 2005 | PS2 | Tales of the Abyss | 2011 | 3DS | Remake | |
| Tecmo Super Bowl | 1991 | NES | Tecmo Bowl Throwback | 2010 | Xbox 360, PlayStation 3 | Remake | |
| Teenage Mutant Ninja Turtles: Turtles in Time | 1991 | Arcade | Teenage Mutant Ninja Turtles: Turtles in Time Re-Shelled | 2009 | PS3, Xbox 360 | Remake | |
| Tengai Makyō II: Manji Maru | 1992 | TurboGrafx-16 | Tengai Makyō II: Manji Maru | 2003 | PS2, GC | Remake | |
| Tekken Tag Tournament | 1999 | Arcade, PS2 | Tekken Tag Tournament HD | 2011 | PS3 | Remake | |
| The Thing | 2002 | Windows, Xbox, PS2 | The Thing Remastered | 2024 | Switch, PS4, PS5, Windows, Xbox One, Xbox Series X/S | Remaster | |
| The Witcher | 2007 | Windows | The Witcher Remake | TBA | TBA | Remake | |
| The Witcher 3: Wild Hunt | 2015 | Windows, Xbox One, PS4 | The Witcher 3: Wild Hunt Remastered | 2026 | Windows, PS5, Xbox Series X/S, Switch 2 | Remaster | |
| Toki | 1996 | Arcade | Toki | 2018 | Windows, Switch, Xbox One, PS4 | Remake | |
| Tokimeki Memorial | 1994 | TurboGrafx-16 | Tokimeki Memorial: Forever with You Emotional | 2025 | Switch | Remaster | |
| Tomb Raider | 1996 | Saturn, PS1, MS-DOS | Tomb Raider: Anniversary | 2007 | Windows, PS2, Xbox 360, PSP, Wii, mobile phones, OS X, PS3 | Remake | |
| Tomb Raider | 1996 | Saturn, PS1, MS-DOS | Tomb Raider: Legacy of Atlantis | 2026 | Windows, PS5, Xbox Series X/S | Remake | |
| Tomb Raider | 2013 | Windows, PS3, Xbox 360, OS X, Linux | Tomb Raider: Definitive Edition | 2014 | PS4, Xbox One | Remaster | |
| Tomb Raider | 1996 | Saturn, PS1, MS-DOS | Tomb Raider I–III Remastered | 2024 | Switch, PS4, PS5, Windows, Xbox One, Xbox Series X/S | Remasters | |
| Tomb Raider II | 1997 | PS1, Windows | Tomb Raider I–III Remastered | 2024 | Switch, PS4, PS5, Windows, Xbox One, Xbox Series X/S | Remasters | |
| Tomb Raider III | 1998 | PS1, Windows | Tomb Raider I–III Remastered | 2024 | Switch, PS4, PS5, Windows, Xbox One, Xbox Series X/S | Remasters | |
| Tomb Raider: The Last Revelation | 1999 | PS1, Windows, Dreamcast, Mac OS | Tomb Raider IV–VI Remastered | 2025 | Switch, PS4, PS5, Windows, Xbox One, Xbox Series X/S | Remasters | |
| Tomb Raider: Chronicles | 2000 | PS1, Windows, Dreamcast, Mac OS | Tomb Raider IV–VI Remastered | 2025 | Switch, PS4, PS5, Windows, Xbox One, Xbox Series X/S | Remasters | |
| Tomb Raider: The Angel of Darkness | 2003 | PS2, Windows, Mac OS X | Tomb Raider IV–VI Remastered | 2025 | Switch, PS4, PS5, Windows, Xbox One, Xbox Series X/S | Remasters | |
| Tony Hawk's Pro Skater | 1999 | PlayStation | Tony Hawk's Pro Skater HD | 2012 | Xbox 360, PS3, Windows | Remakes | |
| Tony Hawk's Pro Skater 2 | 2000 | PlayStation | Tony Hawk's Pro Skater HD | 2012 | Xbox 360, PS3, Windows | Remakes | |
| Tony Hawk's Pro Skater 3 | 2001 | PS2, PS1, GBC, GC | Tony Hawk's Pro Skater HD | 2012 | Xbox 360, PS3, Windows | Remakes | |
| Tony Hawk's Pro Skater | 1999 | PS1 | Tony Hawk's Pro Skater 1 + 2 | 2020 | Windows, PS4, Xbox One | Remakes | |
| Tony Hawk's Pro Skater 2 | 2000 | PS1 | Tony Hawk's Pro Skater 1 + 2 | 2020 | Windows, PS4, Xbox One | Remakes | |
| Transport Tycoon Deluxe | 1995 | MS-DOS, Windows | OpenTTD | 2004 | Windows, MacOS, Linux, Solaris, FreeBSD | Remake | |
| Trials of Mana | 1995 | SNES | Trials of Mana | 2020 | Windows, Switch, PS4 | Remake | |
| Turok: Dinosaur Hunter | 1997 | N64, Windows | Turok: Dinosaur Hunter | 2015 | Windows, macOS, Xbox One, Linux, Switch, PS4 | Remasters | |
| Turok 2: Seeds of Evil | 1998 | N64, Windows | Turok 2: Seeds of Evil | 2017 | Windows, macOS, Xbox One, Linux, Switch, PS4 | Remasters | |
| Turok 3: Shadow of Oblivion | 2000 | N64 | Turok 3: Shadow of Oblivion Remastered | 2023 | Switch, PS4, PS5, Windows, Xbox One, Xbox Series X/S | Remasters | |
| TwinBee | 1985 | Arcade | 3D Classics: TwinBee | 2011 | 3DS | Remake | |
| Ultima V: Warriors of Destiny | 1988 | Amiga, Apple II, Atari ST, C64, C128, MS-DOS, FM Towns, PC-98, X68000, NES | Ultima V: Lazarus | 2005 | Windows, Mac OS X | Remake | |
| Ultimate Mortal Kombat 3 | 1995 | Arcade | Ultimate Mortal Kombat 3 | 2010 | iOS | Remake | |
| Uncharted: Drake's Fortune | 2007 | PS3 | Uncharted: The Nathan Drake Collection | 2015 | PS4 | Remasters | |
| Uncharted 2: Among Thieves | 2009 | PS3 | Uncharted: The Nathan Drake Collection | 2015 | PS4 | Remasters | |
| Uncharted 3: Drake's Deception | 2011 | PS3 | Uncharted: The Nathan Drake Collection | 2015 | PS4 | Remasters | |
| Until Dawn | 2015 | PS4 | Until Dawn | 2024 | PS5, Windows | Remake | |
| Vigilante 8 | 1998 | PS1, N64, GBC | Vigilante 8 Arcade | 2008 | Xbox 360 | Remake | |
| Warcraft: Orcs & Humans | 1994 | MS-DOS | Warcraft I: Remastered | 2024 | Windows | Remaster | |
| Warcraft II: Tides of Darkness | 1995 | MS-DOS, Windows | Warcraft 2: Remastered | 2024 | Windows | Remasters | |
| Warcraft II: Beyond the Dark Portal | 1996 | MS-DOS, Windows | Warcraft 2: Remastered | 2024 | Windows | Remasters | |
| Warcraft III: Reign of Chaos | 2002 | Windows, Mac OS X | Warcraft III: Reforged | 2020 | Windows, MacOS | Remaster | |
| Warcraft III: The Frozen Throne | 2003 | Windows, Mac OS X | Warcraft III: Reforged | 2020 | Windows, MacOS | Remaster | |
| Wasteland | 1988 | Apple II, C64, MS-DOS | Wasteland Remastered | 2020 | Windows, Xbox One | Remaster | |
| Wasteland 2 | 2014 | Windows, Mac OS X, Linux | Wasteland 2: Directors Cut | 2015 | Linux, Mac OS X, Windows, Switch, PS4, Xbox One | Remaster | |
| Wing Commander | 1990 | MS-DOS | Super Wing Commander | 1994 | 3DO, Macintosh | Remake | |
| Wonder Boy | 1986 | Arcade | Wonder Boy Returns | 2016 | Windows, PS4, Switch | Remake | |
| Wonder Boy III: The Dragon's Trap | 1989 | Master System | Wonder Boy: The Dragon's Trap | 2017 | Xbox One, Switch, PS4, Windows, macOS, Linux, Android, iOS | Remake | |
| White Day: A Labyrinth Named School | 2001 | Windows | White Day: A Labyrinth Named School | 2015 | Android, iOS, Windows, PS4 | Remake | |
| Wild Arms | 1996 | PS1 | Wild Arms Alter Code: F | 2005 | PS2 | Remake | |
| Wild Guns | 1994 | SNES | Wild Guns Reloaded | 2016 | PS4, Windows, Switch | Remake | |
| Wipeout HD | 2008 | PS3 | Wipeout Omega Collection | 2017 | PS4 | Remasters | |
| Wipeout HD Fury | 2009 | PS3 | Wipeout Omega Collection | 2017 | PS4 | Remasters | |
| Wipeout 2048 | 2012 | PSV | Wipeout Omega Collection | 2017 | PS4 | Remasters | |
| The Wonderful 101 | 2013 | Wii U | The Wonderful 101: Remastered | 2020 | Windows, Switch, PS4 | Remaster | |
| Worms World Party | 2001 | Windows, Dreamcast, PS1, GBA, Windows Mobile, N-Gage, Gizmondo | Worms World Party Remastered | 2015 | Windows | Remaster | |
| X-COM: UFO Defense | 1994 | DOS, Amiga | XCOM: Enemy Unknown | 2012 | Windows, Linux, OS X, iOS, Android, PS3, PSV, Xbox 360 | Remake | |
| Xenoblade Chronicles | 2010 | Wii | Xenoblade Chronicles: Definitive Edition | 2020 | Switch | Remaster | |
| Yakuza | 2005 | PS2 | Yakuza Kiwami | 2016 | PS4, PS3, Xbox Series X/S, Windows, PS5, Switch, Switch 2 | Remake | |
| Yakuza 2 | 2006 | PS2 | Yakuza Kiwami 2 | 2017 | PS4, Windows, Xbox Series X/S, PS5, Switch 2 | Remake | |
| Yakuza 3 | 2009 | PS3 | Yakuza Kiwami 3 & Dark Ties | 2026 | PS4, Windows, Xbox Series X/S, Switch 2, PS5 | Remake | |
| Yakuza 3 | 2009 | PS3 | Yakuza 3 Remastered | 2019 | PS4, Xbox One, Windows | Remasters | |
| Yakuza 4 | 2010 | PS3 | Yakuza 4 Remastered | 2019 | PS4, Xbox One, Windows | Remasters | |
| Yakuza 5 | 2015 | PS3 | Yakuza 5 Remastered | 2019 | PS4, Xbox One, Windows | Remasters | |
| Yu-Gi-Oh! GX Tag Force 3 | 2008 | PSP | Yu-Gi-Oh! Tag Force GX | 2027 | Windows, Switch, Switch 2 | Remake | |
| Ys I: Ancient Ys Vanished | 1987 | PC-88 | Ys I: Ancient Ys Vanished | 1988 | NES | Remake | |
| Ys I: Ancient Ys Vanished | 1987 | PC-88 | Ys Book I & II | 1989 | TurboGrafx-CD | Remake | |
| Ys I: Ancient Ys Vanished | 1987 | PC-88 | Ys Eternal | 1997 | Windows | Remake | |
| Ys I: Ancient Ys Vanished | 1987 | PC-88 | Ys I & II: Eternal Story | 2003 | PS2 | Remake | |
| Ys I: Ancient Ys Vanished | 1987 | PC-88 | Legacy of Ys: Books I & II | 2008 | DS | Remake | |
| Ys I: Ancient Ys Vanished | 1987 | PC-88 | Ys I & II Chronicles | 2009 | PSP | Remake | |
| Ys II: Ancient Ys Vanished – The Final Chapter | 1988 | PC-88, PC-98 | Ys Book I & II | 1989 | TurboGrafx-CD | Remake | |
| Ys II: Ancient Ys Vanished – The Final Chapter | 1988 | PC-88, PC-98 | Ys Eternal | 1997 | Windows | Remake | |
| Ys II: Ancient Ys Vanished – The Final Chapter | 1988 | PC-88, PC-98 | Ys I & II: Eternal Story | 2003 | PS2 | Remake | |
| Ys II: Ancient Ys Vanished – The Final Chapter | 1988 | PC-88, PC-98 | Legacy of Ys: Books I & II | 2008 | DS | Remake | |
| Ys II: Ancient Ys Vanished – The Final Chapter | 1988 | PC-88, PC-98 | Ys I & II Chronicles | 2009 | PSP | Remake | |
| Ys II: Ancient Ys Vanished – The Final Chapter | 1988 | PC-88, PC-98 | Ys II Eternal | 2000 | Windows | Remake | |
| Ys III: Wanderers from Ys | 1989 | PC-88, PC-98 | Ys: The Oath in Felghana | 2005 | Windows, PSP | Remake | |
| Ys IV: Mask of the Sun | 1993 | SNES | Ys IV: Mask of the Sun – A New Theory | 2005 | PS2 | Remake | |
| Ys V: Lost Kefin, Kingdom of Sand | 1995 | SNES | Ys V: Lost Kefin, Kingdom of Sand | 2006 | PS2 | Remake | |
| YU-NO: A Girl Who Chants Love at the Bound of this World | 1996 | PC-98, Saturn, Windows | YU-NO: A Girl Who Chants Love at the Bound of this World | 2017 | PS4, PSV, Windows, Switch | Remake | |
| Zone of the Enders | 2001 | PS2 | Zone of the Enders HD Collection | 2012 | PS3, Xbox 360 | Remasters | |
| Zone of the Enders: The 2nd Runner | 2003 | PS2 | Zone of the Enders HD Collection | 2012 | PS3, Xbox 360 | Remasters | |
| Zone of the Enders: The 2nd Runner | 2003 | PS2 | Zone of the Enders: The 2nd Runner M∀RS | 2018 | PS4, Windows | Remaster | |
| Zool | 1992 | Amiga | Zool Redimensioned | 2021 | Windows | Remake | |

== See also ==
- High-definition remasters for PlayStation consoles
