= Zone of the Enders (video game) =

2001 video game

- Developer: Konami Computer Entertainment Japan
- Publisher: Konami
- Director: Noriaki Okamura
- Producer: Hideo Kojima
- Artists: Yoji Shinkawa; Nobuyoshi Nishimura
- Writers: Noriaki Okamura; Shuyo Murata
- Composers: Maki Kirioka; Akihiro Honda; Norihiko Hibino; Toshiyuki Kakuta; Shuichi Kobori
- Series: Zone of the Enders
- Platform: PlayStation 2
- Release: JP: March 1, 2001; EU: March 23, 2001; NA: March 28, 2001
- Genres: Action; Hack and slash
- Modes: Single-player; Multiplayer

Zone of the Enders (ZONE OF THE ENDERS(ゾーン オブ エンダーズ), Zōn obu Endāzu; ZONE OF ENDERS), officially abbreviated as Z.O.E., is a 2001 action hack-and-slash video game developed and published by Konami for the Sony PlayStation 2. The game is based around mecha combat in outer space. Over the course of the game, the player obtains new weapons and has to protect towns from enemies.

The story is set in the space around Jupiter and follows a young colonist named Leo Stenbuck, one of the few survivors from his colony after it was attacked by the military force BAHRAM. The player controls the Orbital Frame known as Jehuty. Surviving using a mecha, Leo is on a mission to return Jehuty to the Space Force and uses the Frame to protect civilians. The game was created with the intention of having a more serious and realistic focus on the mecha genre. The mechas were designed by Yoji Shinkawa, the character and mechanical designer for the Metal Gear series.

The critical reaction to Zone of the Enders was positive. While the combat and graphics were generally well received, its short length and poor localization were the areas most commonly receiving criticism. The game spawned two follow-ups: The Fist of Mars, a spin-off for the Game Boy Advance, and The 2nd Runner, a direct sequel for the PlayStation 2. The Japanese animation studio Sunrise also produced two works related to Zone of the Enders. The game was re-released for PlayStation 3 and Xbox 360 alongside its direct sequel, Zone of the Enders: The 2nd Runner, in October 2012 as part of the Zone of the Enders HD Collection.

== Gameplay ==
Jehuty defeats an enemy Raptor with its blade. The green bar shows Jehuty's health while the top shows the remaining enemies.

Zone of the Enders is a hack and slash and third-person shooter game in which the player takes the role of Leo Stenbuck, a child who becomes the pilot of the advanced mecha, or Frame, known as Jehuty. Jehuty is capable of three-dimensional movement, flying, and hovering. Leo uses Jehuty to traverse across different areas of a space colony orbiting Jupiter while attacking rogue Orbital Frames using its advanced weaponry. In some stages of the story, there is also the objective of minimizing damage to nearby buildings and civilians, encouraging more strategic combat. Players are given ranks depending on how many buildings and civilians were destroyed or spared. This grading affects the ending sequence outcome. Additionally, the player is given options where to fight in order to avoid linearity. In order to restore Jehuty's health, an item known as Metatron Ore can be found and used in every area.

In battle, Jehuty locks-on to a single enemy Frame and is able to perform advanced maneuvers such as grabbing and throwing enemies, deploying an energy shield, and using booster jets to move quickly and dodge enemy attacks. It is equipped with an energy sword, an energy projectile, and various sub-weapons. As the player progresses, Jehuty's arsenal grows and its abilities expand by obtaining programs alongside their respective code. Every time Jehuty defeats an enemy it gains experience; after gaining a determined amount of experience, it levels up, improving most of its qualities.

Upon completion of the game, a Versus Mode is unlocked. The player can use it to compete with the artificial intelligence (AI) bots or another player while controlling two Frames.

== Plot ==
The game takes place in the year 2172; mankind has colonized Earth's, Mars', and Jupiter's moons. A military force known as BAHRAM sends its primary offensive unit to attack Antilia, a Jupiter colony, in an attempt to secure two advanced machines known as Orbital Frames. One of the few colony survivors, a young boy named Leo Stenbuck, witnesses a falling Laborious Extra-Orbital Vehicle (LEV) killing his friends. He flees to a hangar, where he finds an Orbital Frame by the name of Jehuty. Using this suit and its built-in intelligence, A.D.A, he fends off the BAHRAM forces led by officer Viola who seeks to claim Jehuty on the orders of their leader, Nohman. Leo is then contacted by Elena Weinberg, the commander of the civilian transport vessel Atlantis; it belongs to Earth's military forces, the United Nations Space Force. As Jehuty's original pilot died during the attack, Elena requests Leo's assistance to deliver Jehuty back to them so they can take it to Mars. Leo, however, refuses to kill enemies.

Battling through Antilia, Leo rescues civilians, including Celvice Klein, a friend; he defends the colony from destruction, defeating the BAHRAM forces and their commanders one by one. Before reaching Atlantis, Leo encounters Viola, who seeks a rematch; Leo defeats Viola and spares her. Later, Atlantis pilot Rock Thunderheart meets Leo in person, revealing that BAHRAM forces are still determined to obtain Jehuty and are threatening to destroy the colony. Thunderheart requests Leo's help to pilot Jehuty, as he has realized Leo's skills are superior. Viola then appears, shooting Celvice this time, forcing Leo to fight again. Celvice is taken by Thunderheart to be treated while Leo goes to save the colony.

Leo goes to the docks and Viola battles him once more. However, Viola is defeated again and killed when a leftover bomb blows her out of the colony and into Jupiter's atmosphere. Nohman himself then appears in Jehuty's superior twin Frame Anubis, forcing Jehuty's escape. As Jehuty is docking, A.D.A. reveals to Leo its programming: when taken to the fortress Aumaan on Mars, the mechas is to eject its pilot and self-destruct Jehuty, destroying the frame and the fortress. Leo leaves Jehuty's cockpit and meets up with the crew of the Atlantis and Celvice, who survived a gunshot wound.

== Development ==
Zone of the Enders entered development for the PlayStation and PC, but in actuality Konami had no intentions of releasing them for those platforms. Early prototypes of the game were built on Dreamcast. The game's focus is on anime-style robots with an emphasis on realism compared to common sci-fi works. Development staff were advised by professionals who had done scientific research for other anime series. Director and scenario writer Noriaki Okamura wanted to write a serious story featuring people with complicated lives; its main theme examines the purpose and nature of life, as reflected in Leo's hardships during the game. To support this message, multiple endings for the main narrative were avoided, although side quests could feature different endings. Despite this, two other endings can be unlocked depending on the player's performance when protecting civilians. In contrast to other 3D games, the team worked to give players the sensation that they are controlling a fast robot; this demanded a year of camera work to achieve.

Okamura designed Zone of the Enders to tell a story through gameplay sequences, rather than during cutscenes. As such, the staff focused on adding details such as the destroyed buildings to inform the player's objectives. Character designer Nobuyoshi Nishimura expressed difficulties in designing characters who would both fit the mechas and the 3D models. In order to take advantage of the 3D space, Nishimura sought to move the camera as often as possible. He tried not to "go overboard" during cutscenes to emphasize the appeal of the mechas during gameplay. During development of the game, producer Hideo Kojima assisted the team.

Yoji Shinkawa was in charge of designing the Orbital Frames, the games mechas. Initially, the Frames were to feature unique transformations, but he determined that flying and skating with Jehuty was enjoyable on its own. As a joke, Shinkawa placed the cockpit in the Frames' crotch region. The staff first had the idea of naming a Frame Anubis based on Egyptian mythology; this led to the name Jehuty for the main Frame, a reference to the Egyptian deity, Djehuti. LEVs were intended to appear during the gameplay as weak, easy opponents that would target Jehuty and the Raptors; however, they ultimately appeared only during cutscenes.

Zone of the Enders was originally set to release in Japan on February 1, 2001, but was delayed to March 1, 2001. The Japanese edition premium package contains an original video animation titled ZOE: 2167 IDOLO; produced by Sunrise, it is set five years before the events on the game. Okamura was satisfied with Sunrise's work, noting their experience in producing robot anime. During the animation's production, Shinkawa suggested a design for the titular Frame, IDOLO, to ensure style continuity between the animation and the video game. The English versions of Zone of the Enders were released on March 23, 2001 in Europe and March 28, 2001 in North America. They were originally sold packaged with a preview demo of the then-upcoming Metal Gear Solid 2: Sons of Liberty.

The game's soundtrack was released in Japan on April 25, 2001 by Konami Music Entertainment. According to director Okamura, the music is calm during normal situations, with new tracks added in combat situations to increase the complexity of the music while fighting. The main theme, "Kiss Me Sunlights", was composed and performed by Heart of Air.

== Reception ==
Reception

Aggregate score
Aggregator	Score
Metacritic	78/100

Review scores
Publication	Score
AllGame	3.5/5
Edge	7/10
Electronic Gaming Monthly	7.67/10 (Note: In Electronic Gaming Monthly's review of the original game, two critics gave it each a score of 7.5/10, and the other gave it 8/10.)
EP Daily	7.5/10
Famitsu	31/40
Game Informer	9.25/10
GameRevolution	B−
GameSpot	7.4/10
GameSpy	75%
GameZone	6/10
IGN	7.5/10
Next Generation	4/5
Official U.S. PlayStation Magazine	4.5/5
X-Play	4/5
Maxim	4/5

The original Zone of the Enders received "generally favorable reviews" according to the review aggregation website Metacritic. Chester "Chet" Barber of NextGen called it "a great action game that any gamer will surely enjoy. Unless you simply hate anything with mechs, this is one game you shouldn't miss." In Japan, Famitsu gave it a score of 31 out of 40.

The game's fighting system was praised for its use of 3D camerawork and Jehuty's fast movements. GamePro found it superior to the PlayStation 2's other mecha game available contemporarily, Armored Core 2 thanks to its responsive controls and quick combat. (Note: GamePro gave the original game 4/5 for graphics, sound, control, and fun factor.) The visual design has also been praised as highly detailed. The game was critically acclaimed by Justin Leeper of Game Informer, who remarked Zone of the Enders as one of the most appealing games and found its visuals as ones of the best ones ever found in the PlayStation 2 and added praise to its fighting. However, the presentation has been a major area of criticism; the game's localization was criticized, with the English script being regarded as repetitive and the voice acting "emotionless" by David Smith, writing for IGN. He also reported being annoyed by Leo's English voice acting. The story has been disliked by reviewers with Smith finding the main characters inferior to the ones from other mecha series such as Mobile Suit Gundam whereas Snackdawg of GameZone disliked the story as he stated that despite its dark parts such as the deaths of Leo's friends, his father and his friend being shot, it instead made everyone "simply seems whiny". While liking the game, Leeper recommended players to skip the cutscenes. Despite these complaints, Smith considered it one of the best mecha games he had ever played.

The combat was also considered too easy due to poor enemy AI, lack of variety, and an excessive number of tactical options, and the game has been found to be too short without an increase in challenge on higher difficulty settings. PSX Extreme writer Patrick Klepek criticized the game's open ending, suggesting that the project had been rushed and that it would have been better to increase the game's length and fill in missing plot elements. Shawn Sanders felt the game verged on being "a better rental than purchase," but that the included Metal Gear Solid 2: Sons of Liberty demo made the game worth buying. The versus mode was better received, with Shane Satterfield of GameSpot praising its competitiveness and its accentuation of the singleplayer campaign's strengths with Klepek giving similar responses. On the other hand, GameZone criticized this mode stating it was not worth the wait to unlock it.

During 2001, it was the 81st bestselling game in Japan, with a total of 120,658 units sold. It was the sixth best selling game in North America during March 2001; sales were boosted by the inclusion of a demo for the highly-anticipated Metal Gear Solid 2.

The game was nominated for the "Most Disappointing Game" award at GameSpot's Best and Worst of 2001 Awards, which went to Luigi's Mansion.

=== Legacy ===
In June 2001, Konami announced a spin-off game titled Zone of the Enders: The Fist of Mars for the Game Boy Advance to be developed by Sunrise Interactive. Sunrise also produced an animated television series titled Z.O.E. Dolores, I in 2001. Although there were no plans for a sequel to the original game, in May 2002, Konami announced Zone of the Enders: The 2nd Runner; it was released for the PlayStation 2 in February 2003. To bridge the two games, Konami published an intersequel following Leo's activities with Atlantis and witnessing his growth as a pilot.

A sequel to The 2nd Runner was announced in May 2012 as "The Enders Project," but was cancelled a year later due to difficulty with the HD ports.
