= Zone of the Enders =

- Genres: Third-person shooter, tactical role-playing
- Developers: Konami Computer Entertainment Japan; Sunrise Interactive; High Voltage Software; HexaDrive; Cygames
- Publisher: Konami
- Creator: Hideo Kojima
- Platforms: PlayStation 2 Game Boy Advance; PlayStation 3 Xbox 360; Microsoft Windows; PlayStation 4
- First release: Zone of the Enders: JP: March 1, 2001; EU: March 23, 2001; NA: March 26, 2001
- Latest release: Zone of the Enders: The 2nd Runner: WW: September 6, 2018

Zone of the Enders (Note: Zone of the Enders (ZONE OF THE ENDERS(ゾーン オブ エンダーズ), Zōn obu Endāzu; ZONE OF ENDERS)) is a video game franchise created by Hideo Kojima and Konami that focuses around combat in space with mecha called Orbital Frames. The original Zone of the Enders was released for the PlayStation 2 in March 2001. A sequel, Zone of the Enders: The 2nd Runner was released for the same system in 2003. In 2012, the two games were re-released in high-definition for the PlayStation 3 and Xbox 360 as Zone of the Enders HD Collection. Zone of the Enders: The Fist of Mars was released for Game Boy Advance in 2001. Zone of the Enders: 2167 Idolo, an original video animation, was released in March 2001. A twenty-six episode anime television series Z.O.E. Dolores, I ran from April to September 2001.

== Common themes ==
=== Setting ===
The Zone of the Enders series is set in the late 22nd century. Humanity has colonized Mars, and space colonies are set up in orbit around Jupiter. Fueling this expansion are two scientific advances: the development of the Laborious Extra-Orbital Vehicle (LEV), a mecha used for labor and military use, and the discovery of Metatron, a high-energy ore found on Callisto.

Those in power on Earth begin to take a dim view of the colonists of Mars and Jupiter, calling them "Enders" and imposing harsh, exploitative laws and taxes on them. Eventually, different groups on Mars begin to rise up in opposition to Earth, the most well-known of these being called 'Bahram'. A new weapon given to these rebels is the Orbital Frame, a mecha that makes extensive use of Metatron-based technology. These Orbital Frames come to shape the destiny of Earth and its colonies, for both good and evil.

=== Plot ===
Throughout the Zone of the Enders series, several themes and dramatic devices recur prominently. The story usually revolves around two specific Orbital Frames: Jehuty and Anubis named for the Egyptian gods Thoth and Anubis, created as the two "keys" of a superweapon called Aumaan. In the first game, Bahram forces an attack on Jupiter's colony, Antilia, named for the mythical island, to secure the two Frames, killing several civilians in the process. One of the few survivors, Leo Stenbuck, finds Jehuty and uses it to stop the Bahram soldiers. Leo is hired by the Space Force to deliver Jehuty back to their ship. On his way to the Space Force, Leo rescues several civilians and often talks with Jehuty's artificial intelligence, A.D.A., regarding the value of life. When succeeding, Leo is requested to work for the Space Force to protect the colony from a terrorist attack. Although Leo succeeds in saving the colony, he is saddened by the revelation that A.D.A. is programmed to self-destruct Jehuty in Bahram's fortress of Aumann.

Shortly before the release of the sequel, Konami released a side story that explores Leo training in the Space Force and hiding Jehuty.

The sequel, Zone of the Enders: The 2nd Runner, is set two years after the first game. The story introduces the player to an ex-Bahram operative named Dingo Egret, who stumbles upon the hidden Jehuty. Bahram soon finds Dingo; Nohman, Bahram's leader, wishes to bring Dingo back to his side. Dingo's reluctance to return to Bahram leads Nohman to shoot him. However, Nohman's minion, Ken Marinaris, saves Dingo's life by connecting his body to Jehuty and requests his help to defeat him. Dingo agrees to defeat Nohman after learning from Leo that Jehuty will self-destruct in Aumann. Dingo joins with Leo and the Space Force to defeat the Bahram forces. In Aumann, Dingo defeats Nohman and Anubis, and uses the remains of the two Frames to stop Aumann.

== Games ==
=== Zone of the Enders (2001) ===
The first game in the series details the story of a boy named Leo Stenbuck, a colonist from Jupiter who accidentally finds himself piloting the Orbital Frame Jehuty.

=== Zone of the Enders: The Fist of Mars (2001) ===
This is a side-story released for the Game Boy Advance, about a conspiracy involving the construction of Orbital Frames for Earth. The protagonist, a young man named Cage Midwell, finds himself getting involved with a resistance organization known as BIS.

=== Zone of the Enders: The 2nd Runner (2003) ===
A new pilot, Dingo Egret, finds Jehuty on the Moon of Callisto two years after the events of the first game and travels to the superweapon Aumaan in order to defeat Colonel Nohman of the Bahram army, who pilots Jehuty's sister craft, Anubis.

=== Zone of the Enders HD Collection (2012) ===
At E3 2011, Konami announced a re-release of Zone of the Enders and Zone of the Enders: The 2nd Runner on the PlayStation 3 and Xbox 360. It includes updated interfaces for the HD resolutions, redrawn art, Trophy/Achievement support, improved audio, rumble support and a new opening animation produced by Sunrise, set to the theme song of Zone of the Enders: The 2nd Runner, "Beyond the Bounds". It includes a demo for Metal Gear Rising: Revengeance, mirroring the first game's inclusion of the Metal Gear Solid 2: Sons of Liberty demo. A PlayStation Vita version was announced but was later canceled. At an event in May 2012, the HD Collection was given a release date in Japan for October 25. At the same event, producer Hideo Kojima confirmed that work on the next installment in the Zone of the Enders series had begun.

=== Zone of the Enders: The 2nd Runner Mars (2018) ===
At Tokyo Game Show 2017, Zone of the Enders: The 2nd Runner Mars (Note: Known in Japan as ANUBIS ZONE OF ENDERS M∀RS (アヌビス ゾーン オブ エンダーズ M∀RS)) was announced, featuring enhanced graphics, 4K resolution support, VR headset support, new sound design and "next-gen surround sound".

== Future ==
Since 2008, Zone of the Enders 3 has been in concept development by Hideo Kojima, but was kept away from game development until all the big titles were completed. On May 25, 2012, Kojima confirmed that work on the next installment in the Zone of the Enders series had begun. However, the project was cancelled after Kojima Productions acknowledged issues within the HD Collection.

== Anime ==
Zone of the Enders: 2167 Idolo (released 21 February 2001) is a prequel for the entire series, telling the story of Radium Lavans, the pilot of the first Orbital Frame.

Zone of the Enders: Dolores, i (released April to September 2001) is a followup to Idolo, following the exploits of James Links, an alcoholic trucker, who, while trying to reunite with his estranged family, discovers an Orbital Frame hidden in one of his shipping containers. The frame, calling itself Dolores, seems to consider James her prince.

== Reception ==
Aggregate review scores
Game	Metacritic
Zone of the Enders	(PS2) 78/100
Zone of the Enders: The Fist of Mars	(GBA) 71/100
Zone of the Enders: The 2nd Runner	(PS2) 82/100
Zone of the Enders HD Collection	(X360) 75/100 (PS3) 73/100

Zone of the Enders achieved moderate success. While the first game obtained good sales in North America as a result of including the demo for Metal Gear Solid 2: Sons of Liberty, Zone of the Enders: The 2nd Runner, received mediocre sales. Hideo Kojima cites "errors in setting the release time frame" and being overshadowed by other major titles as the reason it did not achieve high sales.

Critical reception to the two PlayStation 2 titles has been positive. The action elements and graphics generated good response. The sequel was found to have improved several elements from the first game to the point GameSpot called it "what the original Zone of the Enders should have been." Both games have also been criticized for their story modes' short length and mixed views were offered regarding their replay value. The voice acting and script translation has been panned by most writers as it made the character unappealing and the dialogue repetitive, respectively.

The HD Collection ported by High Voltage Software received mixed reviews, citing that the games' graphics have been improved but suffering from an inconsistent framerate not seen in the PS2 titles as well as suffering from technical issues and lack of special content for all console versions. A patch was worked on by HexaDrive and released which improved textures, anti-aliasing, and framerate, as well as restored other visual effects, but only for the PS3 version and only affected The 2nd Runner HD Edition.
