= Zone of the Enders: The 2nd Runner =

2003 video game

- Developer: Konami Computer Entertainment Japan (Note: The 2nd Runner M∀RS was developed by Cygames.)
- Publisher: Konami
- Director: Shuyo Murata
- Producer: Hideo Kojima
- Artists: Yoji Shinkawa; Nobuyoshi Nishimura
- Writers: Shuyo Murata; Ryosaku Ueno; Kensuke Yoshitomi
- Composers: Maki Kirioka; Akihiro Honda; Toshiyuki Kakuta; Norihiko Hibino
- Series: Zone of the Enders
- Platforms: PlayStation 2 PlayStation 4 Windows
- Release: February 13, 2003: PlayStation 2; JP: February 13, 2003; NA: March 11, 2003 Special Edition; EU: September 26, 2003; JP: January 15, 2004 Remaster PlayStation 4, Windows; NA: September 4, 2018; WW: September 6, 2018
- Genres: Action, hack and slash
- Modes: Single-player, Multiplayer

Zone of the Enders: The 2nd Runner, known in Japan as Anubis: Zone of the Enders, (Note: Japanese: ANUBIS ZONE OF THE ENDERS(アヌビス ゾーン オブ エンダーズ), Hepburn: Anubisu Zōn obu Endāzu) is an action hack and slash video game developed and published by Konami for the PlayStation 2 in 2003. The sequel to Zone of the Enders is based around mecha combat with the player once again controlling the "Orbital Frame" Jehuty. Unlike its predecessor, the game is now centered on action elements with the player not needing to protect civilians in need and instead Jehuty contains more weaponry than in the previous game.

The plot is set two years after the events from Zone of the Enders and focuses on Dingo Egret, a former member from Mars' military organization BAHRAM whose leader Ridley "Nohman" Hardiman wants back with him. Nohman shoots Dingo following his rejection, but the agent Ken Marinaris saves Dingo by connecting his body to Jehuty and forces him to work in order to defeat BAHRAM. The game had a new director, Shuyo Murata, who producer Hideo Kojima appointed in order to provide a different experience. The team worked to cover the criticism the original Zone of the Enders received which resulted in The 2nd Runner having more action elements.

The game received generally favorable critical responses due to the improvements it made to the previous game. Critics praised the game's graphics and gameplay elements, but criticized its short length and presentation. Despite the positive critical reaction, the game suffered mediocre sales. The 2nd Runner was released on PlayStation 3 and Xbox 360 as a part of the Zone of the Enders HD Collection in 2012. A remaster, The 2nd Runner M∀RS, was released in September 2018 for PlayStation 4 and Windows. It features enhanced graphics with 4K resolution and VR headset support, as well as an updated sound design supporting surround sound.

== Gameplay ==
Jehuty shielding against the attack of a boss enemy. Enemy health is indicated on the top of the HUD, while player health, energy, and sub-weapon are below.

Throughout Zone of the Enders: The 2nd Runner, the player controls Jehuty, the Orbital Frame piloted by Dingo, from a normally behind-the-back third-person viewpoint that centers itself between the player and enemy when locked on. Jehuty now possesses the ability to attack several enemies at the same time and interact with the environment by grabbing objects and use them as weaponry. The gameplay is linear, eschewing the "world map" of Zone of the Enders in favor of consecutive stages in which the player must defeat large numbers of robotic enemies, as well as other Orbital Frames and combat vehicles. The player can fully repair Jehuty by collecting Metatron, and save their progress at the beginning of each stage. The player can level up by destroying enemies, and collects "sub-weapons" by defeating bosses. Depending on the player's storyline progress, the capabilities of Jehuty can change. After certain missions, the player's performance is ranked with a letter rating; the entire game is given a score as well.

The player can unlock "Extra Missions" during the course of the game, as well as replaying the game with any incarnation of Jehuty. The game also includes a single- and multiplayer versus mode.

Zone of the Enders: The 2nd Runner also includes an unlockable 3D remake of the original Gradius arcade video game called Zoradius. In Zoradius, the player uses the Vic Viper in fighter mode, flying through a tunnel and shooting down various non-humanoid enemies from the game to gather powerups to increase the Viper's firepower and shields. Roughly halfway through the stage, the player has to fight through an area full of ring-shooting Moai heads, also a staple of the Gradius series. The game ends in a Boss fight against the Train boss, also from the main game. The music and sound effects used in Zoradius are taken from the first Gradius arcade game, composed by Miki Higashino.

== Plot ==
The game is set in the year 2174, two years after the events of Zone of the Enders. It follows Dingo Egret, a miner working on Callisto. He inadvertently discovers the Orbital Frame, Jehuty, hidden. When he is attacked by BAHRAM forces who have come to seize it, Dingo climbs into Jehuty and engages the attackers, which include a female Orbital Frame runner named Ken Marinaris. During the battle, Dingo enters the BAHRAM battleship, seemingly defeating Nephtis, an Orbital Frame controlled by an AI program based on Viola's fighting style, but is subdued by Anubis, Jehuty's superior counterpart controlled by Col. Ridley "Nohman" Hardiman, leader of BAHRAM. Nohman requests Dingo to join him once again. When Dingo refuses as his comrades were sacrificed by Nohman years ago, Nohman shoots him and leaves him to die.

However, Ken has Dingo revived and placed inside Jehuty. As Jehuty is acting as a life-support system, if Dingo leaves Jehuty, he will die. She then tells him that she is a UNSF spy, working undercover and needs Dingo's help. Helped by Ken, Dingo escapes the battleship with Taper, a soldier with the UNSF who was hiding within the ship, and heads for Mars. On Mars, Dingo confronts UNSF pilot Leo Stenbuck who is Jehuty's former pilot. Leo reveals the AI A.D.A. is programmed to self-destruct Jehuty in BAHRAM's base Aumaan which forces Dingo to join Leo in his quest to destroy Aumaan. After several battles on the planet, Dingo runs into Nephtis once more and battles her. The A.I. within Nephtis possesses Ardjet, forcing Dingo to disable the Orbital Frame to purge the computer virus. Ken climbs into Jehuty and, together, they seek out Lloyd, a BAHRAM scientist who can upgrade Jehuty, allowing it to stand a chance against Anubis.

In a secured complex, Dingo and Ken find Lloyd who tells Dingo to fight him if he wants Jehuty's upgrade. After defeating Lloyd in combat, he has Ken's help to upgrade Jehuty. While Jehuty is being upgraded, Nohman flies in and attacks Dingo. Lloyd helps Dingo escape but is killed by Nohman in the process. As Ken is left behind Dingo learns she is actually a BAHRAM member whose father was one of Dingo's former comrades and that his death resulted in her wish to get revenge on Nohman.

Dingo meets up with Leo again, and they travel to Aumaan. Once there, they battle what they think to be Anubis, but it is later revealed to be a decoy with Ken inside. Nohman cripples Jehuty and flees the facility, destroying it. Ken tells Dingo and Leo that Aumaan is actually on Phobos, the largest moon of Mars. The three enter compressed space, where Dingo battles Anubis along the way. Upon reaching Phobos, Dingo does battle with Nohman again, this time destroying Anubis, but not before Nohman can activate Aumaan. Dingo manages to prevent the detonation by throwing Anubis' head into the core, and escapes with Leo. After the battle, Dingo is nursed back to health.

== Development ==
Although Zone of the Enders had an open ended ending, director Noriaki Okamura claimed there were no plans for a sequel to the original game. However, in May 2002 Konami announced Zone of the Enders: The 2nd Runner. The team behind The 2nd Runner had a different director, scriptwriter and game designer. This was done to create a "whole new Z.O.E." Shuyo Murata, who previously did the cinematics for Zone of the Enders, wrote an idea for the sequel which involved Jehuty surviving to an addiction to Metatron, the game's energy. Producer Hideo Kojima liked this idea so much that he appointed Murata as the sequel's director. However, no elements from Murata's plan were used in the game. Kojima stated that most of the game's credit is owed to Murata.

The Konami staff worked in the game's graphics to make it stand out within other games released for the PlayStation 2. Several staff members from the Metal Gear series worked in the special effects. In order to give it an "anime feel," the team implemented a "quasi-toon-shade" to the explosions. The action was improved so that the player could fight several enemies at the same time unlike in the prequel where fights were one-on-one. In order to the deliver this action feature properly, the team spent a year working on a new 3D camera. In response to criticism, the team avoided backtracking and went through a more linear game design. The variety of enemies also were increased to avoid monotonous gameplay. The game offers several missions in which the player is assisted by non-playable characters in the form of LEVs. This feature was originally intended to be used in the prequel but it only appeared in the form of cutscenes. For The 2nd Runner the team managed to implement this feature during gameplay. The new main character Dingo Egret was made a former soldier in order to contrast with the previous games protagonist Leo Stenbuck who was a reluctant hero. Kojima referred to theme of the game as "Awakening."

Most mecha were designed by Yoji Shinkawa, the character and mechanical designer for the Metal Gear series who had previously worked in the prequel. For the previous, Shinkawa had made rough sketches of a coffin-shape mech. As Murata liked the designed, he requested Shinkawa to develop it as Ken's Frame. Leo's new mech, Vic Viper, was based on the space ship with the same name from the Gradius scrolling shooter games. Shinkawa had the idea of making Vic Viper being Leo's mech and that it would be able to transform which Murata was approved. Additionally, the character Lloyd and the Frame Inhert were designed by Kazuma Kaneko of Megami Tensei fame. The character illustrations and select mecha illustrations were created by Tsubasa Masao. The character designs were made by Nobuyoshi Nishimura who advised the team in doing the special effects.

Prior to the game's release, a Japanese demo was packaged with an issue of Dengeki PlayStation magazine in January 2003. The game was released in Japan in both a regular edition and a limited edition. A variety of weapons, enemies, and boss battles have been added to the game. The "Special Edition" PAL and NTSC-J versions of the game featured a variety of additions and extras to the game, including new VR Training options, added scenarios, more difficulties, a music video featuring a remixed "Beyond the Bounds" theme, improved anti-aliasing and graphical optimizations, and new Orbital Frames for Versus Mode, among other improvements to the game. This version was released in Japan as Anubis Zone of Enders Special Edition on January 15, 2004, alongside a CD soundtrack.

=== Music ===
ANUBIS Zone of the Enders Original Soundtrack

Soundtrack album by Zone of the Enders
- Released: March 19, 2003
- Genres: Electronica, J-pop
- Length: 68:43
- Label: Konami Music Entertainment
- Producer: Konami Music Entertainment

Zone of the Enders chronology
Zone of the Enders Z.O.E Original Soundtrack (2000)	ANUBIS Zone of the Enders Original Soundtrack (2003)

The soundtrack to Zone of the Enders: The 2nd Runner was released on March 19, 2003, on the album ANUBIS Zone of the Enders Original Soundtrack by Konami Music Entertainment. The album was composed by the same artists as the previous album, Norihiko Hibino, Maki Kirioka, Akihiro Honda, Toshiyuki Kakuta and Shuichi Kobori. It was also released in Europe around the same date the European version was released.

The game's theme song, "Beyond the Bounds," was composed by Maki Kirioka and performed by Maki Kimura. In creating the song Kirioka discussed with Murata the idea of creating an upbeat song to fit the story. While not feeling sure about being able to sing it, Kirioka felt she could do it after meeting singer Maki Kimura. A CD single was distributed in Tokyo Game Show 2002. A remix of the song by Mitsuto Suzuki, titled "Beyond the Bounds (Mitsuto Suzuki 020203 Mix feat.Sana)" also included on the soundtrack, is played during a music video extra in the PAL and NTSC-J "Special Edition" versions of the game, and appears on Pop'n Music 8. Non-English parts of the lyrics of "Beyond the Bounds" were influenced by the Finnish language.

== Reception ==
Reception

Aggregate score
Aggregator	Score
Metacritic	82/100

Review scores
Publication	Score
Electronic Gaming Monthly	7.5/10, 9.0, 8.5
Eurogamer	8/10
GameRevolution	B+
GameSpot	8.5/10
GameSpy	3/5
IGN	8.6/10

Award
Publication	Award
Japan Game Awards	Award for Excellence

The game received positive reviews from game sites earning an 82 out of 100 in Metacritic. Video game publications noted it had several improvements over the original Zone of the Enders with GameSpot calling it "what the original Zone of the Enders should have been." This was due to the faster combat, the increase of Jehuty's abilities and the variety of the enemy number. A reviewer from Electronic Gaming Monthly called it "the best game I've played since Metroid Prime" praising Jehuty's fast movements and its challenging difficulty. However, the gameplay also attracted criticism with GameSpy finding it underdeveloped and having several scripted boss battles. GameRevolution agreed on simplistic gameplay core referring to it as a "fairly straightforward shooter with no customization and little ship development." The game's short length was also a common subject of criticism. Critics offered different opinions regarding the replay value. While Eurogamer was disappointed with its short length and expected a future sequel to solve this problem, GameSpot believed it was worth replaying due to its combat and extra content. In the Japan Game Awards from 2002, The 2nd Runner received the "Award for Excellence."

The game's presentation was well received when it came to graphics. Critics enjoyed the mix between 3D elements and anime-like characters. GameRevolution noted that while it the framerate sometimes has issues resulting in slowdowns, it is still one of the best looking games from its console. Similarly, IGN came listed it as one of the best looking PlayStation 2 games of all time. The story has been praised for its bigger focus on action rather than philosophy with Dingo Egret being better received than the prequel's lead Leo Stenbuck. However, the English dub has often been criticized with GameSpy referring to it as "atrocious" while a reviewer from Electronic Game Monthly found that Dingo had the worst deliveries in the entire game. Additionally, the script has been criticized for often repeating the same words.

Despite its favorable reception, The 2nd Runner got mediocre sales. In 2003, it was the 130th best-selling game in Japan, selling 97,296 copies. Producer Hideo Kojima blamed himself due to issues with the release time frame. He considered the game a "medium success" and believed it could have ended up "a major Kojima Productions title to follow MGS" as a series. As a result, Kojima mentioned he devised as a game plan and method for sales should eventually develop another sequel.

In late 2012, The 2nd Runner was ported to the Xbox 360 and PlayStation 3 alongside its predecessor as part of the Zone of the Enders HD Collection. The release included a demo for the upcoming Metal Gear Rising: Revengeance. Since 2008, Zone of the Enders 3 has been in concept development by Hideo Kojima, but was kept away from game development until all the big titles were completed. On May 25, 2012, Kojima confirmed that work on the next installment in the Zone of the Enders series had begun. However, the project was cancelled after Kojima Productions acknowledged issues within the Zone of the Enders HD collection.

At Tokyo Game Show 2017, Zone of the Enders: The 2nd Runner M∀RS was announced, featuring enhanced graphics, 4K resolution support, VR headset support, and an updated sound design supporting surround sound. It was released in September 2018 for PlayStation 4 and Windows. The game sold a combined 158,691 units for the PS2 and PS4 in Japan.
