= Zone of the Enders HD Collection =

Zone of the Enders
- Developer: High Voltage Software (Note: The patch for the PlayStation 3 version was handled by HexaDrive.)
- Publisher: Konami
- Series: Zone of the Enders
- Platforms: PlayStation 3 Xbox 360
- Release: JP: October 25, 2012; NA: October 30, 2012; EU: November 30, 2012; AU: December 6, 2012
- Genres: Third-person shooter Hack and slash
- Modes: Single-player; Multiplayer

Zone of the Enders HD Collection is a compilation of remastered ports of Zone of the Enders and Zone of the Enders: The 2nd Runner released for the PlayStation 3 and Xbox 360. A PlayStation Vita version was planned, but was cancelled. The HD collection also includes a demo for Metal Gear Rising: Revengeance.

== Reception ==
Reception

Aggregate score
Aggregator	Score	
Aggregator	PS3	Xbox 360
Metacritic	73/100	75/100

Review scores
Publication	Score	
Publication	PS3	Xbox 360
Destructoid	N/A	8/10
Eurogamer	8/10	N/A
GameRevolution	5/10	5/10
GamesMaster	N/A	83%
GameSpot	5.5/10	6/10
GameTrailers	8/10	N/A
Hardcore Gamer	4.5/5	N/A
IGN	7/10	7/10
Official Xbox Magazine (US)	N/A	8/10
PlayStation: The Official Magazine	8/10	N/A
The Digital Fix	N/A	8/10
Metro	6/10	N/A

The Xbox 360 version of the Zone of the Enders HD Collection received "generally favorable reviews", while the PlayStation 3 version received "mixed or average reviews", according to Metacritic.
