= Zone of the Enders: The Fist of Mars =

2001 video game

- Developer: Winkysoft
- Publisher: Konami
- Director: Atsushi Kamata
- Producers: Takashi Shimomichi; Noriaki Okamura
- Programmer: Masahiro Shō
- Artists: Katsuzou Hirata; Koji Kurosumi; Takeshi Shimoyama
- Writer: Kazuyoshi Horikawa
- Composers: Tatsuya Fujiwara; Susumu Nakamura
- Series: Zone of the Enders
- Platform: Game Boy Advance
- Release: JP: September 27, 2001; NA: February 26, 2002; EU: June 7, 2002
- Genre: Tactical role-playing
- Mode: Single-player

Zone of the Enders: The Fist of Mars, known in Japan as Zone of the Enders: 2173 Testament (ZONE OF THE ENDERS(ゾーン オブ エンダーズ) 2173 TESTAMENT(テスタメント), Zōn obu Endāzu 2173 Tesutamento), is a tactical role-playing video game developed by Winkysoft and published by Konami in 2001 for the Game Boy Advance. The game is story-orientated, and is based around turn-based strategic mecha combat.

== Storyline ==
The story is set within the Zone of the Enders universe. It is 2173 and humankind, in the search for a valuable resource called Metatron, has expanded its reaches to Mars and the moons of Jupiter, and full colonies have been established. However, Earth keeps a tight rein over the colonials, known by the derogatory term "Enders", and discrimination is commonplace. Food supplies are short, movement of citizens is controlled, and many Mars inhabitants have tried to rise up against Earth, but to little avail.

The game follows the story of a 17-year-old boy named Cage Midwell, a worker upon the interplanetary express ship "Bonaparte III" with his close friend (and idol) Ares Enduwa. However, on a routine journey, Cage spots a woman creeping into the cargo holds, and follows her. As he does this, the ship is attacked by a powerful black Orbital Frame. Cage and the girl, who introduces herself as Myona Alderan, climb into a mysterious LEV held within the ship and escape, eventually crash-landing on Mars. They are quickly caught and are accused of being the ones responsible for the crash. On top of this, Myona has completely lost her memory. However, shortly after their imprisonment, they are freed by an "Anti-Terrestrial League" leader called Deckson Geyse. His faction, BIS (Born In Space), quickly come and rescue them, and Cage finds himself caught up in the escalating conflict between Earth and Mars.

== Structure ==
The game is structured in a manner resembling an anime television series, with 26 "episodes", each containing one mission. Each episode (with the exception of the last, which is purely storyline-based) consists of a series of story scenes, followed by a gameplay, and closing with another series of story scenes. Between episodes, the player can purchase equipment and upgrades for their mecha, and save the game. A directory of terms and characters is available, gameplay may be saved at any point during combat, and story scenes can be fast-forwarded, reversed, or skipped completely. Also, meeting certain criteria in game can lead to different endings and missions.

Gameplay consists of an interface similar to that of Super Robot Wars. The characters' mecha have various attacks and statistics that allow them to perform different tasks, and different strengths and weaknesses in combat (For example, Mebius' Orbital Frame Orchist has powerful ranged attacks in the forms of the Elfen Bow and the Moon Balista moves, but is weak in close combat both offensively and defensively). There are a variety of different mission objectives, from protecting targets to destroying particular enemy combatants. Attacks are performed or evaded by using the IAS (Interactive Attack System) where the player targets or avoids the enemy from a 1st person perspective.

== Reception ==
Reception

Aggregate score
Aggregator	Score
Metacritic	71 of 100

Review scores
Publication	Score
Electronic Gaming Monthly	6 of 10 (Note: Three critic of Electronic Gaming Monthly gave the game each a score of 6.5/10, 6/10, and 5.5/10.)
Eurogamer	5 of 10
Famitsu	28 of 40
Game Informer	6.5 of 10
GamePro	3.5 of 5
GameSpot	7.3 of 10
GameSpy	78%
IGN	6.3 of 10
Nintendo Power	3.8 of 5
RPGFan	84%

At the time of its release, Zone of the Enders: The Fist of Mars received "mixed or average reviews" according to the review aggregation website Metacritic. IGN's Craig Harris criticized the game's dialogue elements, saying that it is over-saturated and detracts from the overall experience. In Japan, Famitsu gave it a score of 28 out of 40.
