= Visage (video game) =

2020 indie survival horror video game

- Splash screen of the game
- Developer: SadSquare Studio
- Publisher: SadSquare Studio
- Designer: Jonathan Vallières
- Programmer: Jonathan Gagné
- Artists: Martin Mcghee; Jean-Sebastien Olivier
- Writer: Victoria Suchanek
- Composer: Peter Wicher
- Engine: Unreal Engine 4
- Platforms: Microsoft Windows; PlayStation 4; PlayStation 5; Xbox One; Xbox Series X/S
- Release: Windows, PS4, Xbox One; 30 October 2020; Enhanced Edition; Xbox Series X/S; 28 October 2021; PlayStation 5; 11 November 2021
- Genre: Psychological horror
- Mode: Single-player

Visage is a 2020 independent psychological horror video game developed and published by SadSquare Studio. Set in a strangely structured house with a somber history, players control Dwayne Anderson as he explores the backstories of the inhabitants that once lived there. The game is presented in first-person perspective, and a large portion of the house is accessible, although some areas require keys. Obstacles include avoiding the dark to reduce loss of sanity, though several tools can aid players through the dark.

Mainly inspired by the Silent Hills playable teaser, the game ran Kickstarter and Steam Greenlight campaigns. Various horror video games were cited as inspirations, several of which also drew comparisons with Visage. It was later released for PC on 30 October 2020, and in 2021 on console platforms. The game saw praise for its psychological effectiveness, audiovisual design, and atmospheric tension, though it was criticized for its limited inventory, cumbersome gameplay, and bugs.

== Gameplay ==
At times, lights may turn off or doors may slam shut, signalling paranormal activity. These events, as well as staying in the dark for long periods of time, will cause the player to lose their sanity, resulting in much more severe paranormal experiences.

Visage has a similar setting and gameplay as its spiritual predecessor P.T.. The game takes place in a large suburban home in the 1980s and utilizes a first-person-perspective. The player controls Dwayne Anderson, an inhabitant of the home who committed suicide after killing his wife and children. Dwayne is trapped inside the house and is tormented by supernatural entities. The objective of the game is to find a way out of the house and learn about the cause of all the paranormal activity.

The house is designed as a semi-open world, with large sections freely explorable to the player at all times and multiple pathways to reach each area. However, in order to fully explore the map, players will need to find keys to unlock each door first. The player must face several hazards while exploring. First, they will have to avoid dark areas to manage their sanity. Sanity, like similar systems in games such as Amnesia: The Dark Descent, is decreased if Dwayne stays in the dark for too long.

Secondly, ghosts will create paranormal events by manipulating the house as the player explores. Examples include light bulbs breaking, doors slamming or opening, and electronic devices malfunctioning. Witnessing these events will cause Dwayne's sanity to fall. Lastly, Dwayne must avoid being caught by the various ghosts and demons that inhabit the home. Being caught by these ghosts and demons means instant death, so players must carefully maneuver through the house to avoid them. The lower Dwayne's sanity, the more severe each paranormal event becomes, up to the point that a ghost or demon will appear and attack the player.

Players can use lighters, pills, light bulbs, and candles to help them avoid these threats. Lighters allow the player to move through dark areas without a light, taking pills can recover sanity, light bulbs can be used to repair broken lights, and candles are a light source that ghosts cannot manipulate. There are various other items the player can find and use, like a camera or a sledgehammer.

Dwayne has a limited inventory and can store only five of these items at a time and hold two more in his hands.

The fourth chapter of the game is divided into seven subchapters; in each subchapter, players must find VHS tapes scattered through the house, each labeled differently: Pride, Negligence, Indifference, Prison, Addiction, Greed, and Affliction.

== Plot ==
In 1985 at a suburban home, a man named Dwayne Anderson shoots and kills his wife and two children before killing himself. Waking up at a bloody, empty room, he hears a voicemail from neighbor Rose, who has not seen him out of his house in three weeks. He tries opening the front door, but it is locked. Paranormal events begin occurring throughout the house, and Dwayne begins searching for a way out. In the process, he navigates through experiences, divided into three chapters, centering around the people who once lived there.

The first chapter is about Lucy, a little girl who in 1961 was befriended by a demon that communicated with her via television and radio. Over time, due to the demon's influence, Lucy's behavior became increasingly abnormal. One day, under the demon's direction, Lucy killed her pet bird Peaco by biting its head off. Lucy's horrified parents took her to therapy; however, the syringing only worsened Lucy's mental state. Further tormented by the demon, she locked herself in the bathroom and ripped off her jaw, subsequently dying from blood loss while her parents desperately bang on the door; the demon later unlocked it.

The second chapter revolves around Dolores and George, an elderly couple who had a baby. In 1962, Dolores was reported to exhibit symptoms of various mental disorders, such as Dolores hearing her own voice from the baby monitor reciting a numerical sequence—the key to her "inner house." George believed that the remedies given to Dolores were unhelpful, stressing him. As Dolores worsened, she became increasingly mistrustful and even hostile towards George, once attacking him believing he was poisoning her tea. Dolores eventually murdered George, stabbing him with seven knives and leaving his corpse in his study room. Later, Dolores hanged herself next to her crying baby's bassinet.

The third chapter features 28-year-old Rakan Al-Mutawa, who suffered from scopophobia and believed that someone is spying on and attempting to silence him. In 1970, he was attacked by a shadowy entity and used a firearm to defend himself, after which he is interned in a psychiatric hospital. Believing the hospital to be part of the conspiracy against him, Rakan wreaked havoc: threatening the staff, behaving violently, jumping from a window, sabotaging the building's electricity, and even killing a staff member with a crowbar. Doctors were often forced to sedate him when he acted out. In response, Rakan was isolated from all other patients and staff. Months later, doctors concluded that Rakan was recovering, and he was officially discharged. Sometime later, however, Rakan, now disabled, declared victory against the unnamed entity, before being locked and killed in a desolate cell by an unknown figure.

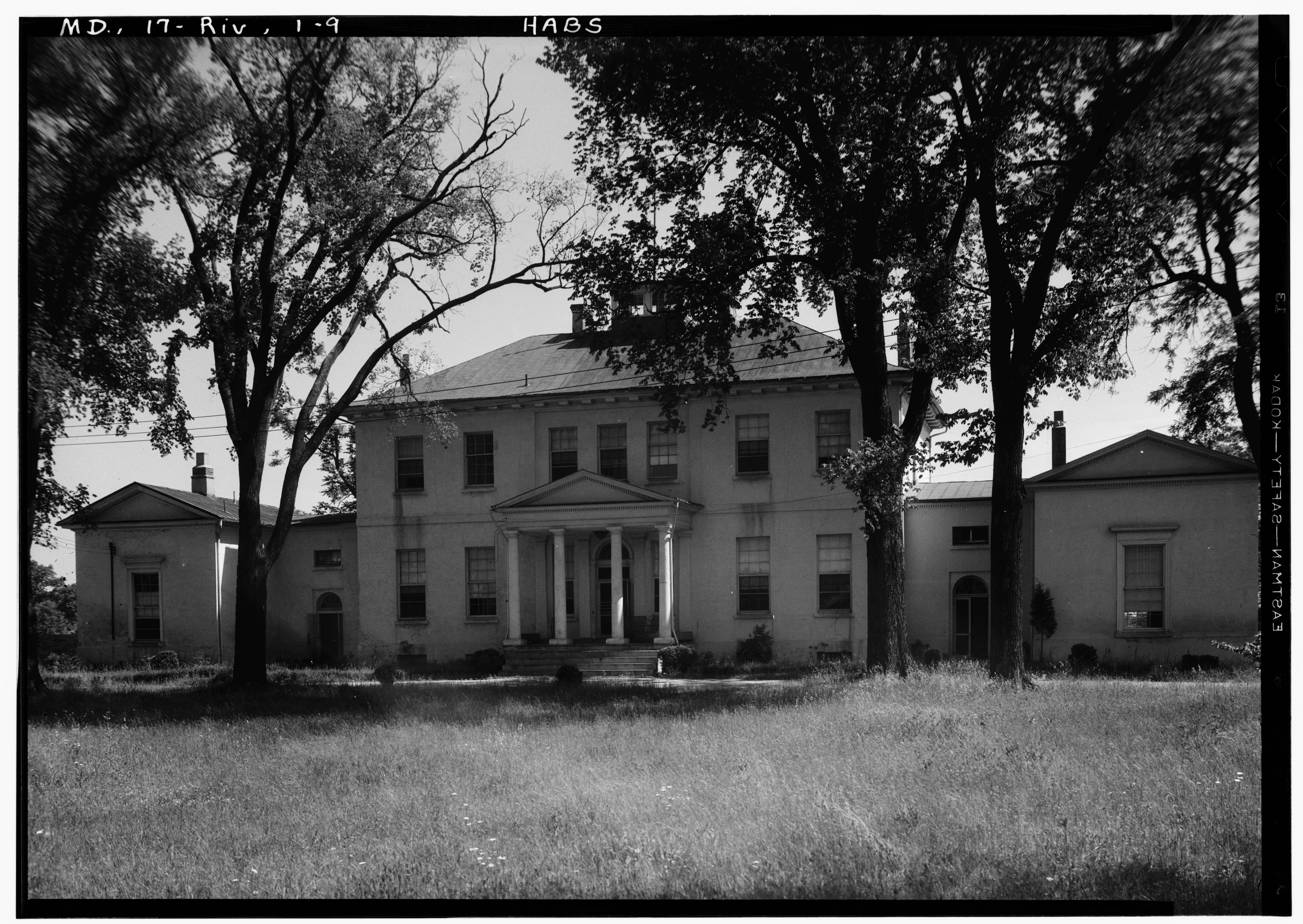
Riversdale, fictionally a water treatment plant Dwayne worked at in the game

The final chapter observes Dwayne's past family, consisting of wife Claire, son John, and daughter Sarah. Dwayne, an alcoholic, distanced himself from them. When Claire discovered that Dwayne had been abusively consuming Chlorpromazine to relieve stress, she expressed concern, before she disappears and a naked man wearing a plague mask speaks to Dwayne in a distorted voice of Claire, telling Dwayne she was a gold digger who wanted him dead by various suicide methods, all of which are the causes of death of the previous inhabitants in the house. This chapter also has a scene where Dwayne sits at a sofa drinking a "wonderful" alcoholic "poison", as the television plays a live video of the masked man angrily seeking to find Dwayne's true self. There is also a scene set in Hell: a tall and wide cave, where people make themselves suffer; the masked man claims that thanks to Dwayne, everyone in Hell "enjoys their newfound home." The chapter ends with revealing that Dwayne was a scientist who started working at a water treatment plant in Riversdale, Oregon in April 1952. There, Dwayne drops an apple to a well, which causes dead bodies to float. He faints and wakes up at his house.

=== Endings ===
The game has multiple endings. In the default ending, Dwayne wears a mask, and it is day. He enters a room behind a haphazardly painted wall, and teleports to a white screen with his family in the distance. The credits' background feature a heavenly rainforest.

In the alternate ending, named "The Void", Dwayne enters the room. Opening a secret door and going down a staircase, he reaches the room in the game's opening, with the revolver there. Dwayne shoots himself like he did in the opening. In a flash, he sees the location of one of the seven VHS tapes needed to collect to achieve the default ending. After collecting one, time repeats itself six times— at last, the revolver is empty. Dwayne wakes up in the well in Chapter 4, endless in all directions. If the player plays via Steam or console, they will receive the Void Trophy.

== Development ==
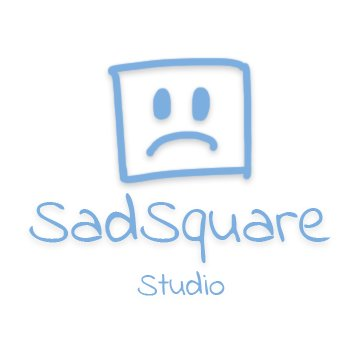
Logo of developer SadSquare Studio

Visage started development in January 2015 and was announced in September. The game was successfully financed by a Kickstarter campaign running from January through March 2016. They set the goal to CAD 35,000. In October 2015, a Steam Greenlight campaign was launched, featuring a trailer embedded in the page.

In an interview with IGN, the developer, SadSquare Studio, stated that the game is conceptualized to mainly utilize "the uncanny" to create a sense of dread and fear. It was inspired by P.T.., the teaser for Silent Hills; graphics designer Jonathan Vallières stated that the project's cancellation motivated the creation of the game. Other inspirations include The Conjuring, Insidious, Sinister, Ju-on, Ring, Kairo, Phantasmagoria, and Amnesia: The Dark Descent.

== Release ==
The developers initially targeted the release date to be in January 2017, in both computers (PC) and virtual reality (VR). On 25 September 2018, the developers announced that a demo of Visage would be released on 2 October 2018. The demo version for Visage was released on Steam on 2 October 2018, and that it was planned for release on early 2019. After a long delay, on 15 February 2020, SadSquare Studio announced that "the main content of Visage is pretty much done", and that they were projecting for a fall 2020 release. It was released on 30 October 2020, amidst the COVID-19 pandemic. In addition to PC, it was also released on PlayStation 4 and Xbox One. It was later released an Enhanced Edition on Xbox Series X and Series S and PlayStation 5 on 28 October 2021.

== Reception ==
Reception

Aggregate score
Aggregator	Score
Metacritic	(PC) 81/100 (PS4) 80/100 (XONE) 78/100

Review scores
Publication	Score
Adventure Gamers	4/5
Eurogamer	8/10
Game Informer	8.75/10
IGN	7.4/10
Jeuxvideo.com	16/20

Visage received "generally favorable" reviews for the Windows, PlayStation 4, and Xbox One versions, according to review aggregator Metacritic. On OpenCritic, 78% of critics recommended the game.

Many critics praised the game's atmosphere, which they described as providing viewers with a constant and gradual state of anxiety. Doug Mercer of COGconnected called the game traumatizing and "nightmare-inducing", which gave it a unique style of storytelling, and Daniel Tack of Game Informer wrote that the game may cause real-life anxiety while opening doors or descending stairs. Thus, critics expressed guarantee that horror fans will be satisfied with the game, and that players will be interested to replay it. Its inspiration from P.T. is said to be apparent, with Eurogamer Italy calling it "the best Silent Hill emulator of the last decade." The atmosphere is also credited to the sound design and lighting. It was also credited to the music, with the music from Lucy's chapter deemed the best for its gradual rise in tension, creating a rare kind of unsettlement. Some critics said that many faint-hearted gamers might not enjoy the game, and the lack of instructions was criticized. Lynn called the survival part of the game "underdeveloped", though he noted that the psychological aspect is what matters.

Visage's story saw mixed reviews. Mercer praised the psychological effectiveness with the player character's objective of not turning insane, though criticized the way the story ends despite being overshadowed by the atmosphere. Alan Strawbridge of PlayStation Universe deemed Lucy's chapter the best. Though subsequent chapters still maintain the same tension in unique ways and was praised for diversifying the scope of the game, the repetition of the same places within the house was criticized.

The controls and dynamics of Visage have been criticized. Many critics commented on the limited inventory, meaning one cannot store as much survival items as needed. The gameplay also allows two items to be held at respective hands, which is criticized as its complexity makes the gameplay laborious and cumbersome, though it was noted that the game employs a niche, patience-centric type of horror gameplay. Strawbridge complained that some of the PlayStation controls were difficult to reach, ruining the suspension of disbelief. The frustration of trying to retrieve important items as players struggle to survive saw polarizing opinions, though it was said to be not much a problem for the minimalistic game. Several critics noted that there are some technical problems, obvious due to it being produced independently. However, it was also noted that these bugs prevented retrieval of items at times, and the game would often confuse the player standing in a lit area as being in a dim one. The struggle of having to save manually has also been noted.

== See also ==
- Allison Road – another first-person horror game considered to be a spiritual successor to P.T.
