= Abandoned (video game) =

- Developer: Blue Box Game Studios
- Publisher: Blue Box Game Studios
- Director: Hasan Kahraman
- Engine: Unreal Engine 5
- Platforms: PlayStation 5; Windows
- Genre: Survival horror
- Mode: Single-player

Abandoned is the tentative title for an upcoming survival horror game being developed and published by Blue Box Game Studios, an independent video game company based in The Netherlands. Described as a "cinematic horror survival shooter" featuring "realistic" gameplay mechanics, Abandoned's premise centres around Jason Longfield, who must escape a forest after being kidnapped. A playable teaser of Abandoned, titled Abandoned: Prologue, is also in development and is planned to be released before the main game.

Originally announced as a PlayStation 5 exclusive title in April 2021, Abandoned drew significant media attention and hype due to the game trailer's stylistic similarities to Silent Hill and Metal Gear Solid, leading to speculation that Hideo Kojima was involved in the game's development. These rumours were discredited by Blue Box, its CEO Hasan Kahraman and later by Kojima himself.

Abandoned's development has been troubled, with the game's concept and design being changed multiple times, and its gameplay trailer and release date were both repeatedly pushed back before Blue Box indefinitely suspended any tentative release dates for Abandoned and the Prologue in March 2022. Despite this, Blue Box has stated that Abandoned is not cancelled, and both games will be released "when [they are] ready". A Windows version of Abandoned is intended to be produced "eventually". However, the lack of substantive updates have led to accusations that the game is vaporware.

== Synopsis and gameplay ==
This is no fast-paced shooter in which you just run, aim and shoot. Abandoned requires you to hide and plan every shot before pulling the trigger. We want you to be nervous come each and every enemy encounter. To be aware that a wrong move can be the deciding factor between surviving a combat scenario or not.

— Abandoned's initial PlayStation Blog announcement, April 7, 2021

Abandoned has been described as a survival horror game that follows a man named Jason Longfield, who awakens stranded in a forest. Through exploration, he realizes that he was kidnapped and brought to the forest for a "dark purpose". He is tasked with fighting against a cult and its leader, who is Jason's estranged older brother, and finding his way out of the forest. Jason meets up with other characters throughout the game, but the player must ultimately decide at the end of the game whether Jason will fight against, or join, the cult and his brother.

Abandoned makes use of horror, and some first-person shooter elements, and requires tactical use of weapons to survive. The game utilizes a "realistic approach" to survival gameplay, whereby every action the player performs in the game has an effect; for example, sprinting can exhaust Jason and reduce his aim accuracy. It also uses motion-capture technology to determine how Jason will take damage in-game.

== Background ==
The logo of Blue Box Game Studios

Blue Box Game Studios, founded in April 2014 by Hasan Kahraman, is a small Dutch video game development studio with roughly 10 full-time employees as of 2021. (Note: Including freelancers and outsourced developers, the Abandoned development team is composed of roughly 50 people.) The studio's first project, titled Rewind: A Paranormal Investigation, held a Kickstarter campaign to garner funding, though the campaign was cancelled, as the studio had secured outside investment, allowing the game to be reworked into Rewind: Voices of the Past. However, after the scope of the project grew without further investment, the game was cancelled.

The prospect of a game centering around paranormal investigations continued into The Lost Tape, another cancelled project, and The Whisperer, which was cancelled on PC but saw a free-to-play release on mobile devices, though it was delisted shortly after. A mobile Japanese role-playing game titled Tales of Six Swords saw a similarly short-lived mobile release, though Kahraman claims that Blue Box plans to revisit the concept in the future. The Haunting: Blood Water Curse, a Fatal Frame-inspired horror game, was released into early access in 2020. After poor reception, the early access release was removed from digital storefronts, and Kahraman claims that development will be completed by outside studio CreateQ, with Blue Box acting as the publisher.

According to Kahraman, the repeated cancellations of projects were due to lack of staff and fan interest—in an interview with IGN, he said that the team's inexperience was largely to blame, and that the announcement of projects served to gauge a potential audience, and those projects were cancelled when the audience was too small.

== Development and marketing ==
=== Initial announcement and Hideo Kojima involvement rumours ===
Abandoned was first announced as an open world, "cinematic horror survival shooter" game on April 7, 2021 via the PlayStation Blog, along with a minute-long teaser trailer. The trailer contains various shots of a winter forest, including shots featuring an abandoned building with graffiti stating "Kill the Trespasser", and a sign reading "God's town". (Note: It was later discovered by internet users that the announcement trailer for Abandoned was largely an asset flip, composed of assets bought from the Unreal Engine Marketplace for an estimated $100. It is believed to have taken Kahraman an hour to produce.)

After the game's announcement, Abandoned attracted significant media attention from users and media outlets, as it was believed that Japanese video game designer Hideo Kojima and his company Kojima Productions, was involved in the creation of the game, rumoured to be a new Silent Hill entry. This theory, also known as the "Blue Box Conspiracy" or "Kojima Conspiracy", was pushed by the fact that Hasan Kahraman's name shared the same first initials as Hideo Kojima, leading to the belief that Blue Box and "Hasan Kahraman" was a pseudonym for Kojima, in the vein of the promotional stunt Kojima performed for the 2015 game Metal Gear Solid V: The Phantom Pain, where he went under the pseudonym "Joakim Morgen" and had a fake Swedish game company called "Moby Dick Studio", and also to "7780s Studio", another fake company of Kojima's, which created the P.T. demo teaser for the cancelled 2015 game Silent Hills. Furthermore, it was discovered that "Kahraman" translated into Turkish as "Hideo".

The speculation surrounding Kojima's involvement led to the creation of a dedicated subreddit on Reddit, r/TheBlueBoxConspiracy, by fans of Silent Hill to discuss the rumours. In response to the rumours, Blue Box Game Studios released a statement the following day after the game's announcement on April 8, 2021 on their website disavowing their connection to Kojima or Konami, who owns the rights to the Silent Hill franchise. This was further disproved by VentureBeat journalist Jeff Grubb, who revealed that Kojima was in talks with Microsoft/Xbox for his next game, and not PlayStation. Despite this, rumours persisted due to various tweets from Blue Box linking the game to Kojima's Metal Gear and Silent Hill game franchises. On June 15, 2021, Blue Box posted a tweet seemingly referring to Silent Hill, which read; "Guess the name: Abandoned = (First letter S, Last letter L)". Blue Box subsequently apologized for the tweet and said it had been misunderstood. Similarly, on July 27, 2021, Blue Box shared a teaser for Abandoned featuring a blurred image of a person with a left-eyepatch that was compared to Big Boss, one of the protagonists of Kojima's Metal Gear Solid series. In an interview to NME, Kahraman clarified that this was an image of the game's main villain, and not Solid Snake. Due to the repeated rumours, Kahraman had to speak to Konami to clear up his involvement.

Kojima remained quiet on the rumours surrounding his involvement in Abandoned until he addressed and discredited them during an interview on his Brain Structure podcast with Geoff Keighley on November 3, 2022. Kojima said that he was "surprised" by the extent of the rumours, which he did not take seriously until users began sending deepfaked images and messages to him en masse, and described the situation as a "nuisance". Kojima stated that he had continuously been sent these images for "nearly two years". He also stated that he had never met Kahraman, and that he "wouldn't do the same thing twice" with regards to his "Moby Dick Studio" stunt.

=== Realtime Experience app and Abandoned: Prologue ===
On June 20, 2021, Blue Box revealed plans to release a "Realtime Experience" app (originally "Realtime Trailers") to the PlayStation Store. The app was touted as Abandoned's hub for "interactive trailers", where teasers and trailers of Abandoned and its gameplay would be revealed, with reveals to take place during Summer 2021. It was designed to render the cutscenes "in real time", and act as a showcase for the game's graphics and use of Unreal Engine 5.

The Realtime Experience app was scheduled for release on June 20; however, due to localisation issues, it was delayed to June 25 and then to August 10, 2022. Due to technical issues, the app immediately crashed and was unusable on day one, with a patch for the app being uploaded three days later. After being patched, the Realtime Experience app was criticised for only containing a five-second render of a man walking on a wooden floor, and the fact this render had already been teased on Blue Box's Twitter account a few days prior to its release. In an interview with NME six days later, Hasan apologized for the "big disaster" of the Realtime Experience app release. He blamed its failures on the team's use of Unreal Engine 5, which he felt was "not recommended" for use due to its early access state. In the same interview, Hasan also said he would be showing the trailer at Gamescom on August 25, 2021; however, this appearance never materialised.

By August 2021, Abandoned's gameplay was changed from open world to "a linear story", which Kahraman claimed was done to maintain the game's high-quality graphics. He also announced that the game would receive a "playable prologue", which would act as a backstory/introduction to the main Abandoned game. Hasan intends to use the Prologue to fund the development of Abandoned upon its release. While initially plotted as a teaser, Hasan later clarified that the Prologue was now completely separate from the final game.

=== Indefinite delay and asset leak ===
On March 31, 2022, Blue Box released a statement to Twitter announcing that Abandoned: Prologue had been delayed indefinitely, with Kahraman saying that it will come out whenever it is ready. Following this announcement, Blue Box Game Studios deleted a number of past tweets regarding future plans of Abandoned, leading to several publications to believe development on the game has stalled, or that it had been cancelled entirely. Kahraman denied these claims, and said it was due to the game's concept changing, though also stating that he regretted the decision to delete the tweets. On May 16, 2022, some of Abandoned's assets were leaked via Reddit, showing the game's concept had changed drastically from how it was originally characterized into a political thriller.

As of 2026, Kahraman has released no new information about the game or its development, although, in March 2026, ResetEra members discovered that his PlayStation account had recently played a game entitled Abandoned: Gospels of Blood, pointing to the development of the game, or a game titled similarly to it, still being ongoing.

== Reception ==
Although highly anticipated upon its initial announcement, the lack of substantive updates surrounding Abandoned's development have led to accusations that the game is vaporware. In October 2021, Blue Box staff members were reported to have received increased levels of harassment, doxxing and death threats towards them as a result of "The Blue Box Conspiracy". The game's troubled development has been compared to that of the now-defunct 2023 video game The Day Before.

=== GameSpot investigation ===
On June 3, 2022, GameSpot published an investigative report which accused Kahraman of "toxic" activities on a private chat room revolving around the game, in which he revealed scant development information but attempted a romantic advance on one of his artists, who later left the group, allowed a 12-year-old to insult other members with no consequences, and forced others to play Rainbow Six Siege with him. Leaked development assets also had a Silent Hill 5 logo on them, indicating that he sought to trick people into believing Abandoned was part of the Silent Hill series. Others close to Kahraman claimed that little to nothing of the game exists, with the game shifting genres numerous times, and that even the playable prologue was unlikely to be finished, making it largely a hoax.
