= Mohammed Bellounis =

Algerian army officer (1912–1958)

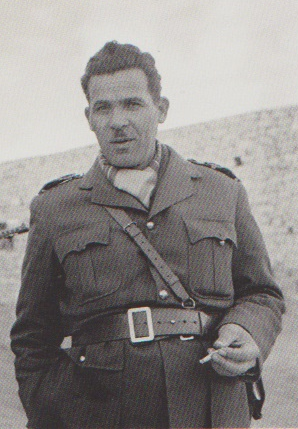
- Born: December 11, 1912; Melouza, French Algeria
- Died: July 13, 1958 (aged 45); Ksar El Hirane
- Military career
- Conflicts: Algerian War

Mohammed Bellounis (Arabic: محمد بلونيس; December 11, 1912, Melouza - July 14 1958, Ksar El Hirane), known as Olivier to the French, was an activist of the Algerian National Movement. He was the commander-in-chief of the Algerian People's National Army (ANPA).

== Biography ==
He was educated at the French primary school, according to the Memoirs of Aït-Ahmed.

He joined the Algerian National Movement party and distinguished himself through his fight against the National Liberation Front (FLN) in Kabylia, then in the Djelfa region. Enjoying influence in the Bordj Bou Arreridj district, he joined the resistance in the mountains in April 1955 and there he created his own maquis.

He had more than 1,200 rifles and 40,000 rounds of ammunition, and took command of the "foudj Bellounis" in the Hizr douar, in Kabylia. According to Chems ed-Din, the author of the book The Bellounis Affair, History of a Fellagha General, his army consisted of 8,000 men.

The Melouza massacre, perpetrated by the FLN, made him realize the urgent need to find an ally. He therefore turned to the French. Jean Combette, captain of a Specialized Administrative Sections unit, made the first contacts with him. A military alliance was concluded: Bellounis pledged to join France on the condition that the French state cease all dealings with the FLN.

He was the target of several assassination attempts intended to disarm the ANPA. Having abandoned his command post on June 25, 1958, he was killed during a clash with a French unit. His body was displayed everywhere.
