= Allison Road =

Allison Road may refer to:

- Allison Road (video game), a horror video game cancelled in 2016
- "Allison Road" (song), a song by the American alternative rock band Gin Blossoms
