= Physint =

Upcoming video game

- Teaser poster from September 2026, starring Bill Skarsgård in the leading role, alongside Charlee Fraser.
- Developer: Kojima Productions
- Publisher: Xbox Game Studios
- Director: Hideo Kojima
- Producer: Hideo Kojima
- Designer: Hideo Kojima
- Artist: Yoji Shinkawa
- Writer: Hideo Kojima
- Genres: Action-adventure, stealth
- Mode: Single-player

Physint (Note: Japanese: フィジント, Hepburn: Fijinto) (Note: Stylized in all caps. A clipped compound of Physical Intelligence.) (working title) is an upcoming action-adventure and stealth game developed by Kojima Productions and set to be published by Xbox Game Studios. The game is set to be directed by Hideo Kojima and marks his second title produced in collaboration with Xbox. The game features an ensemble cast led by Bill Skarsgård, alongside Charlee Fraser, Ma Dong-seok, and Minami Hamabe in supporting roles.

Envisioned as Kojima's anticipated return to the "action-espionage" genre and as a spiritual successor to the Metal Gear franchise, Kojima and PlayStation announced Physint in January 2024, building on their work together following Death Stranding (2019) and its sequel (2025). The game will reportedly feature synergy between interactive elements and a deeper integration of multimedia presentation, as the developer planned to closely collaborate with Sony's film production studio Columbia Pictures.

Production began following the release of Death Stranding 2: On the Beach in June 2025, with the game unveiled in September. Sony ended their involvement with the game in June 2026, leading Kojima Productions to seek a new publishing partner, with Xbox subsequently announced as the game's new publisher that September.

== Development ==
=== Partnership with PlayStation (2024–2026) ===
During the January 2024 State of Play video presentation, Hideo Kojima and the head of PlayStation Studios Hermen Hulst appeared together in a video message to announce a new partnership between Kojima Productions and Sony Interactive Entertainment, who were set to collaborate on another original intellectual property (IP), following their co-development of Death Stranding (2019) and its sequel (2025). The game, under the working title Physint, was described as Kojima's return to the "action-espionage" genre, being regarded as a spiritual successor to Kojima's Metal Gear franchise. In addition, Kojima described his vision for the game as built on multimedia synergy, blending the interactive elements of video games, with the presentation qualities of film, television, and music, in order to "transcend" the mediums in terms of narrative, casting, sound, and themes. This hybrid of formats was expected to be accomplished through close collaboration with Sony's film, television and music divisions, with their film production arm Columbia Pictures being involved in an unspecified capacity. Kojima mentioned that Physint will be the culmination of his work. In December 2023, Kojima Productions filed Japanese trademarks for the "Social Stealth System", assumed to be an asynchronous multiplayer central gameplay element for Physint in similar vein to the multiplayer elements from Death Stranding. Kojima mentioned in his August 2023 An An article that the "Social Stealth System" is based on how persons are treated in public in Japan whether they wear a suit or casual clothes in public.

The following month, Kojima expanded on his decision to produce Physint at that time in an interview, stating that the idea to return to stealth-action games was influenced by a combination of fans' constant inquiries regarding him developing a new Metal Gear game, as well as dealing with illness and undergoing surgery during the COVID-19 pandemic, which caused him to question his own capacity for making video games as he aged, and that he reconsidered his priorities after having successfully launched a franchise with Death Stranding, and being able to develop an original idea with OD. Physint being conceived as a hybrid of interactive and film media was partially influenced by a conversation Kojima had with filmmaker and collaborator Guillermo del Toro, who urged him to continue making video games that were strongly modelled after films in light of receiving requests from Hollywood studios to produce live-action features. In a HideoTube episode that was streamed at the time, he stated that Physint would blur the line between video game and film.

In April 2025, Kojima stated development for Physint would enter 'phase two' after the release of OD, Kojima Productions' other game which was being developed concurrently. He mentioned in an interview with French magazine Le Film français that the title was still "five to six years away" from release. While promoting Death Stranding 2 in July 2025, Kojima insinuated that both OD and Physint could potentially be his last game projects, expressing interest in pivoting Kojima Productions towards filmmaking depending on the studio's situation following their releases. He also cited his age for wanting to pivot to filmmaking after Physint is released. In August 2025, Physint was reported to be in the conceptual stage, with Kojima suggesting he was working on the title's concepts completely alone while the rest of Kojima Productions was involved with OD's production.

In September 2025, Kojima Productions unveiled preliminary details on Physint alongside OD during a special presentation commemorating the studio's tenth anniversary as an independent developer at Toho Cinemas Roppongi Hills. Actors Charlee Fraser, Ma Dong-seok, and Minami Hamabe were announced to have joined the ensemble cast for the title. The game's poster was also presented during the event, depicting the game's main protagonist in silhouette, which has the tagline "Here comes the feeling". Kojima teased that the game would offer "the next stage of tactical-espionage action" and that its graphical fidelity would "break the barrier" between films and games. During the event, Hamabe's likeness was shown using Physint's engine to demonstrate the technology it will use, produced in collaboration with Serbian software company 3Lateral in Novi Sad in January 2025. Staff hiring for Physint was reported on November 2025.

In January 2026, Kojima confirmed that the studio had been recruiting additional Kojima Productions staff in anticipation of entering full production on Physint, with work on additional casting, and facial and performance capture beginning later that year. Pre-production for the game was initially delayed by the 2024–2025 SAG-AFTRA video game strike, which also affected OD. In an interview with An An on December 7, 2025, Kojima expressed interest to produce a sequel to Physint. On December 31, 2025, Kojima shared his New Year message through social media that by 2026, the third phase will start after moving forward with the second phase.

=== Cancellation by PlayStation and partnership with Xbox (2026–present) ===
In June 2026, Sony ceased their partnership on Physint's development, leading Kojima and his studio to seek out a new publisher in the hopes of securing financing and continuing the game's development for three months. That September, Kojima Productions announced that the publishing rights to Physint had been acquired by Xbox Game Studios, extending their ongoing partnership past OD as part of an overall agreement between the two parties that would see them collaborating on projects across games, television, and film. Xbox CEO Asha Sharma separately released a statement complimenting the creator's ambitiousness, which "reflects the kind of creativity we want to support at Xbox". Variety reported that discussions between Kojima and Sharma regarding further collaborations started in early 2026 following her succession from Phil Spencer as Xbox CEO. During Kojima's visit to Xbox in Redmond, Washington, he posed for a photo with Sharma and Chief Content Officer Matt Booty and received an airtight container for him with Kojima's name on the cover. On August 31, 2026, the studio announced new job ads for prospective recruits to join them for work on Physint. On September 14, 2026, Sharma made a visit to Japan where she met with Kojima at the Kojima Productions office to speak about matters related to OD and Physint while signing a message on the office's visitors' wall. Sharma eyeing further partnerships between Xbox and Kojima was speculated as a strategy for the platform holder to achieve a "foothold in Japan", a region and demographic the company had historically struggled with. Sharma's visit coincided with the Tokyo Game Show 2026 convention the following week.

A report from Bloomberg News on September 11, 2026 described that concerns regarding the game exceeding its budget despite a lengthy development period and missing rigorously placed deadlines, softer sales from Death Stranding 2 compared to its predecessor, funding difficulties spurred by recent live-service game failures such as Concord (2024), and contractual obligations that restricted the game from remaining a permanent PlayStation exclusive, all contributed to the decision by Sony to rescind support for the game. Writer Jason Schreier also suggested that Kojima was subject to more intense scrutiny by PlayStation's current leadership that did not reciprocate his intentions as well as prior executives.

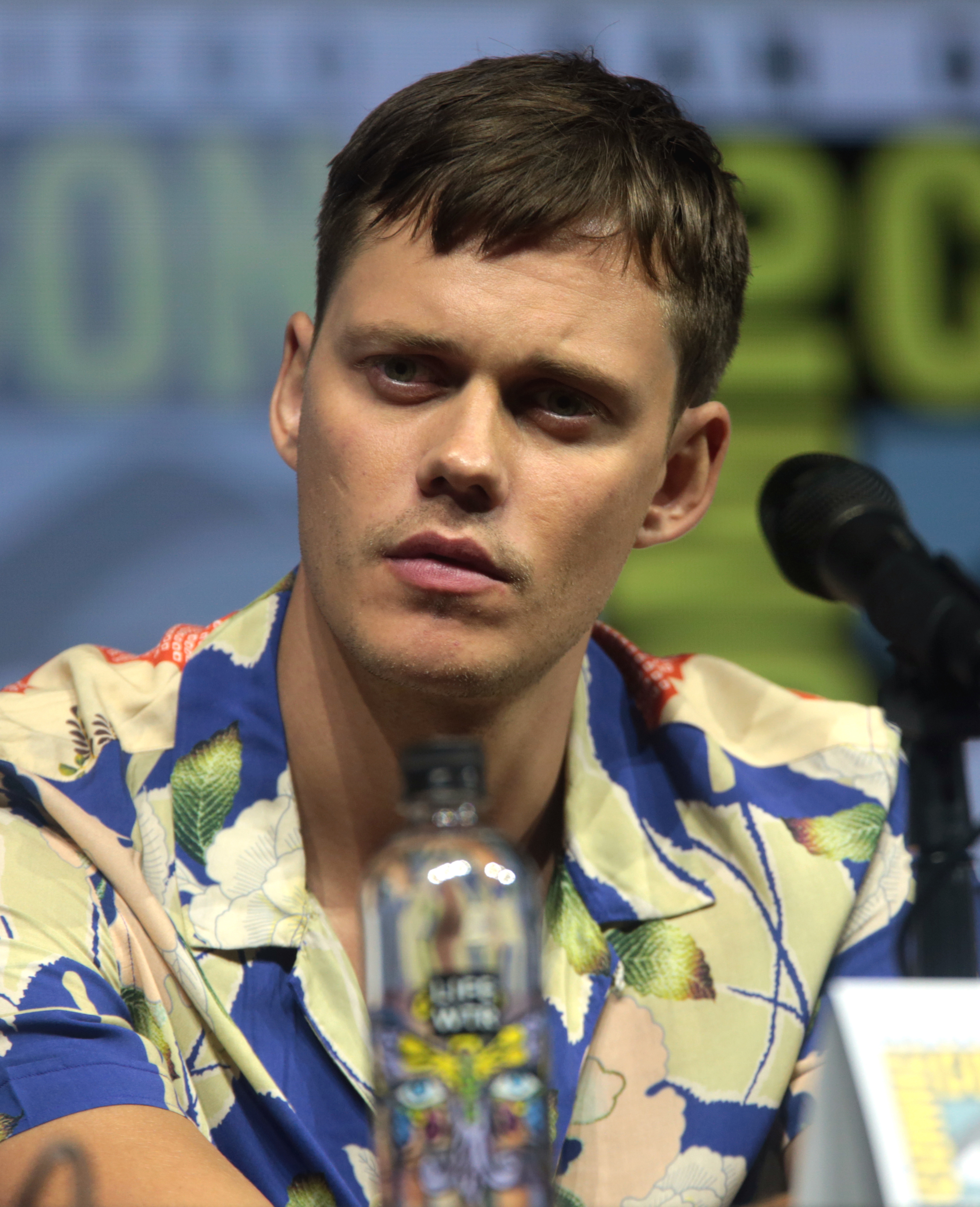
Bill Skarsgård was announced to be playing the game's protagonist in September 2026.

Forbes writer Paul Tassi separately reported that Kojima Productions may lose permission to use Decima, the game engine used for both Death Stranding games, as well as access to Sony Pictures and Columbia Pictures soundstages for filming and motion capture work following the game's cancellation and move to Xbox. Unreal Engine 5, which is already being used to develop OD, is being eyed as a candidate to replace Decima for Physint with an increase in pre-production time. The release of new Physint posters on September 17, 2026 showed the trademarks of Epic Games, 3Lateral, Kojima Productions, Xbox, and MetaHuman, suggesting that UE is being used instead.

During the Xbox Tokyo Game Show stream on September 17, Kojima announced that Bill Skarsgård was officially cast to portray the game's lead after extensive screen tests and costume fittings with Fraser were conducted throughout the year. A new poster, with a picture photographed by Kojima and featuring Skarsgård and Fraser, was unveiled during the event with the tagline "The Next Cold War Begins", which was interpreted online as acknowledging the game's role in reuniting Kojima Productions with the spy thriller genre after previously departing the Metal Gear series, paired with the prior tagline. Kojima reiterated that further casting announcements would be shared in the future. Yoji Shinkawa was confirmed to be collaborating with Kojima as the game's character and mechanical art designer, reprising his duties from prior Kojima Productions games. Kojima is credited as the game designer, director, producer, and writer. The announcement was done before Kojima appeared at the Xbox Fanfest Tour event. On September 19, 2026, Skarsgård posted a message online speaking about his casting in the game and his trust on Kojima as someone "who really blends cinema and video game".

On September 20, 2026 in interviews with IGN and The Washington Post, Kojima Productions Studio president Shinji Hirano said that he found out about the cancellation during a Zoom conference with Kojima and translator/head of talent development Aki Saito, the former seeing Kojima go back to work after the call ended despite being in shock. At the time, Kojima was in New York to attend a Prada event, followed by a trip to Los Angeles before he came back to Tokyo to attend the remote meeting. Some of the studio employees did not find out about the news as Kojima chose not to inform them due to worries about losing his employees hired for game production. They were later informed of the change in publisher on September 9 before Xbox made the announcement of the publishing deal with Kojima Productions. Kojima stated that the studio is looking into various gaming engines to test them when he was asked about his willingness to use Decima. He said the game's story, concepts, and storyboards were already finished. 3D models and enemy AI for Physint are a work in progress. He also denied reports that he and Sony are cutting ties. It was during this time that Kojima scrambled to find a company willing to work with him before he reached out to Xbox. Due to Sony cancelling Physint, some staff members recruited to work on the game were moved to join OD staff, having a small team ready to assist Kojima. The studio issued statements online, stating that anyone reading the news about Sony dropping Physint should take the reports with skepticism due to reports on the cancellation not based from official statements. When asked whether Sony explained their justification for dropping support, Kojima mentioned that they never did during their meeting. Kojima also mentioned that if the studio fails because of Sony cancelling support, then other game creators like him will not opt to create their own game studios.

Kojima mentioned that the first ideas for Physint came when he met with Jim Ryan, who was about to step down from SIE as CEO when he retired on March 2024. Ryan was said to be very interested by the idea for another stealth action game for Sony consoles when Kojima discussed the details with him.

On September 27, 2026, reports based on a podcast made by Christopher Dring of The Game Business suggested that Xbox representatives signed Kojima Productions with a budget of $400 million dollars with Schreier also reporting on similar figures. Windows Central's Jez Corden reported on a fraction of the budget. No official figures were provided on the actual costs as the reports were walked back after Dring clarified that the estimated costs were based on the reports he heard when he attended TGS. The New York Times reported on September 30, 2026 in an interview with Sharma that the deal Xbox signed with Kojima Productions was lower than what the company would "spend to develop a premium game", which included the option to have film and TV series rights developed based on Physint. She also clarified that competition and collaboration will continue between Xbox and Sony, despite Kojima working with the former. On September 30, 2026, Kojima Productions released an interview article of Entei Ryu, where she mentioned her participation in the game as the concept artist.

On October 5, 2026, during the Koji10 podcast's third season, the first episode (Note: This was produced by TBS Radio.) was streamed online in YouTube, where Kojima mentioned that Physint will be a game about spies, but wants it to have a different kind of spy action and set it apart from the Metal Gear franchise. Filming for the game will start by 2027. Additional 3D scanning on the cast members was in the works. Kojima mentioned that more announcements on the cast will be made in the future.

== Exhibits ==
Kojima Productions started an exhibition titled "Kojima productions 10th anniversary exhibition beyond the strand: The Odyssey of Creation and Endeavor", which will run from October 31 through December 20, 2026 at Azabudai Hills Gallery, which has production materials, concept art, documents, design proposals, and previously unseen prototypes related to Physint's production. It showed new concepts, such as a new mech, a complete copy of the game script and a bust based on Bill with different looks.

== Release ==
According to Schreier, Xbox plans to release the game on Windows and an unspecified Xbox console. When asked by IGN if the game will see a potential release on PlayStation consoles in the future on September 20, Kojima said that the final decision would be up to Xbox and stated that they would announce later on for which platform Physint will be released on.
