= Abandonada =

Abandonada may refer to:

- Abandonada (TV series), a 1985 Mexican telenovela
- Abandonada (film), a 2000 Philippine drama film

== See also ==
- Abandoned (disambiguation)
