= Abandon =

Abandon, abandoned, or abandonment may refer to:

== Common uses ==
- Abandonment (emotional), a subjective emotional state in which people feel undesired, left behind, insecure, or discarded
- Abandonment (legal), a legal term regarding property
  - Child abandonment, the extralegal abandonment of children
  - Lost, mislaid, and abandoned property, legal status of property after abandonment and rediscovery
- Abandonment (mysticism)

== Art, entertainment, and media ==
=== Film ===
- Abandon (film), 2002, starring Katie Holmes
- Abandoned (1949 film), starring Dennis O'Keefe
- Abandoned (1955 film), the English language title of the Italian war film Gli Sbandati
- Abandoned (2001 film), a Hungarian film
- Abandoned (2010 film), starring Brittany Murphy
- Abandoned (2015 film), a television movie about the shipwreck of the Rose-Noëlle in 1989
- Abandoned (2022 film), starring Emma Roberts
- The Abandoned (1945 film), a 1945 Mexican film
- The Abandoned (2006 film), by Nacho Cerdà
- The Abandoned (2010 film), starring Mira Furlan
- The Abandoned (2015 film), starring Louisa Krause
- The Abandoned (2022 film), starring Janine Chang
- The Abandonment, a 1916 silent short film

=== Literature ===
- Abandon, a thriller novel by Blake Crouch
- Abandonment, a play by Kate Atkinson

=== Music ===
==== Groups ====
- Abandon (band), an alternative rock band on ForeFront Records
- Los Abandoned, music group

==== Albums ====
- Abandon (album), 1998, by rock band Deep Purple
- Abandoned (album), 2015, by hardcore punk band Defeater

==== Songs ====
- "Abandoned" (song), by Jay Park
- "Abandoned", a song from the Ensiferum album Ensiferum
- "Abandoned", a song from the Extol album Undeceived
- "Abandoned", a song from the Kamelot album The Black Halo
- "The Abandoned", a song from the Memphis May Fire album The Hollow
- "Abandon", a song from the Chariot album Wars and Rumors of Wars
- "Abandon", a song from the Dayseeker album Dreaming Is Sinking /// Waking Is Rising
- "Abandon", a song from the Fallujah album Dreamless
- "Abandon", a song from the Sylosis album Cycle of Suffering

=== Paintings ===
- L 'Abandonne (Georges Rouault) (English: The Abandoned), painting by Georges Rouault

=== Television ===
- Abandoned (TV series), an American reality television series
- "Abandoned" (Lost), episode 30 of Lost, season 2
- "Abandoned", an episode of the TV series Feud
- "Abandoned", an episode of the TV series Power Rangers S.P.D.
- "Abandoned", an episode of the TV series Smallville season 10
- "The Abandoned" (Star Trek: Deep Space Nine), episode 6 of Star Trek: Deep Space Nine, season 3

=== Video games ===
- Abandoned (video game), the tentative title for an upcoming survival horror game being developed by Blue Box Game Studios

== Other uses ==
- Abandoned footwear
- Abandoned pets
- Abandoned railway
- Abandoned village, a human habitat that has been abandoned
- Mate abandonment, in animal behavior, where one parent deserts the other

== See also ==
- Abandonware, a product, typically software, ignored by its owner and manufacturer, and for which no support is available
- Desertion (disambiguation)
