= P.T. (video game) =

2014 video game

- Promotional art
- Developer: Kojima Productions (Note: Under the pseudonym 7780s Studio)
- Publisher: Konami Digital Entertainment
- Directors: Hideo Kojima; Guillermo del Toro
- Composer: Ludvig Forssell
- Series: Silent Hill
- Engine: Fox Engine
- Platform: PlayStation 4
- Release: August 12, 2014
- Genre: Psychological horror
- Mode: Single-player

P.T. (initialism for "playable teaser") is a 2014 interactive teaser for the video game Silent Hills, a cancelled installment in the Silent Hill series. It is a psychological horror game developed by Kojima Productions under the pseudonym "7780s Studio" and published by Konami Digital Entertainment. It was directed and designed by Hideo Kojima in collaboration with filmmaker Guillermo del Toro, and was released for free on the PlayStation 4.

After the cancellation of Silent Hills, Konami removed P.T. from the PlayStation Store and made it impossible to reinstall. The decision prompted criticism and fan remakes. P.T. has been cited as among the greatest horror games of all time, with praise towards its direction and presentation, and has been regarded as one of the most influential horror games, cited as an inspiration for games such as Layers of Fear, Resident Evil 7: Biohazard, and Visage, and has been referenced in subsequent Hideo Kojima projects such as Metal Gear Solid V: The Phantom Pain and Death Stranding.

Kojima's upcoming horror game, OD, has been generally regarded as P.T's spiritual successor.

== Gameplay ==
Unlike in the Silent Hill games, the player character has no means of defense against the hostile ghost Lisa (pictured). Her design has drawn comparisons to the yūrei and ubume in Japanese folklore.

Unlike the third-person perspective in Silent Hill games, P.T. uses a first-person perspective, which centers on an unknown protagonist, controlled by the player, who awakens in a haunted suburban house and experiences supernatural occurrences. Available areas to explore in the home consist of an L-shaped corridor with two rooms adjacent to it: a bathroom, and a staircase which leads to the room in which the player starts a loop, or a continuous reiteration of the corridor. The only actions the player can use are walking and zooming. To progress, the player must investigate frightening events and solve cryptic puzzles. Each time a loop is successfully completed, changes appear in the corridor. Additionally, the player encounters a hostile ghost named Lisa. (Note: Not to be confused with Lisa Garland, the ghost from the first installment of the Silent Hill series.) If she catches the protagonist, there may be a random chance of triggering a jump scare when turning the camera horizontally, in which case the current loop starts again.

After the player solves the final puzzle, a cryptic and unrevealed puzzle that allows the player to escape, a trailer reveals that P.T. is a "playable teaser" for a new game in the Silent Hill series, called Silent Hills, directed by Hideo Kojima and Guillermo del Toro, with the protagonist portrayed by Norman Reedus.

== Plot ==
P.T. centers on an unnamed protagonist (Norman Reedus) who awakens in a concrete-lined room and opens a door to a haunted corridor (Note: The concept of being trapped in a home had been seen earlier in the fourth installment of the Silent Hill series; its premise is that the protagonist Henry Townshend finds himself imprisoned in his apartment and unable to contact the outside world. Like P.T., it featured a first-person perspective when exploring Townshend's apartment.) which continuously loops and redecorates itself. The first time the player passes, a radio reports on a father committing familicide, with later mentions of two other similar cases.

Later on, the protagonist encounters a hostile and unstable female apparition, presumably named "Lisa". Upon entering the bathroom and being locked inside, he obtains a flashlight and discovers a fetus-like creature crying in the sink. The protagonist exits, and he soon realizes that he is being watched and stalked by "Lisa". While the protagonist can avoid the ghost completely, he will die if the ghost attacks him, restarting the loop. Upon awakening, the protagonist discovers a moving bloody paper bag which tells him of a disturbing experience, stating the same quote seen at the start of the game: "Watch out. The gap in the door... it's a separate reality. The only me is me. Are you sure the only you is you?"

The next few loops feature a refrigerator hanging from the ceiling, leaking blood. The muffled sound of a crying baby can be heard from the violently shaking refrigerator. After the player completes a puzzle and enters the next loop, the refrigerator is absent, and the radio issues a Swedish message referencing the 1938 radio drama The War of the Worlds. In the next loop, the lamps turn completely red, the player's vision blurs, the protagonist moves abnormally quickly, and the corridor stretches out into infinity. The protagonist discovers a hole in the wall and looks through it to hear a woman being stabbed to death in the bathroom, while a voice on the radio rants about societal instability. After the sounds stop, the bathroom door opens by itself and the player enters upon the fetus-like creature telling the protagonist that ten months earlier, an unspecified man lost his job, and turned to alcoholism. His wife worked as a part-time cashier to financially support the family, but the manager was sexually attracted to her. The corridor then corrects itself and the protagonist eventually hears a voice uttering "204863" repeatedly. The player's perspective distorts, and the game displays a fake crash message.

When the game is restarted, the protagonist awakens in the concrete-lined room and continues the next and final loop with only the flashlight as a light source. The protagonist discovers the torn pieces of a photograph scattered throughout the hall and reassembles it in its frame. After the picture is completed, and a set of tasks is done, a telephone rings; the protagonist answers the phone to hear the words "You've been chosen." The protagonist hears a door unlock and leaves the building.

In the subsequent cutscene, a voice remarks about having lived a life of regularity until his father killed him and his family without any creativity; he states his intention to return with his "new toys". The protagonist steps out into the streets of a deserted town and is revealed to be portrayed by Norman Reedus. The credits reveal the nature of the playable teaser.

== Development ==
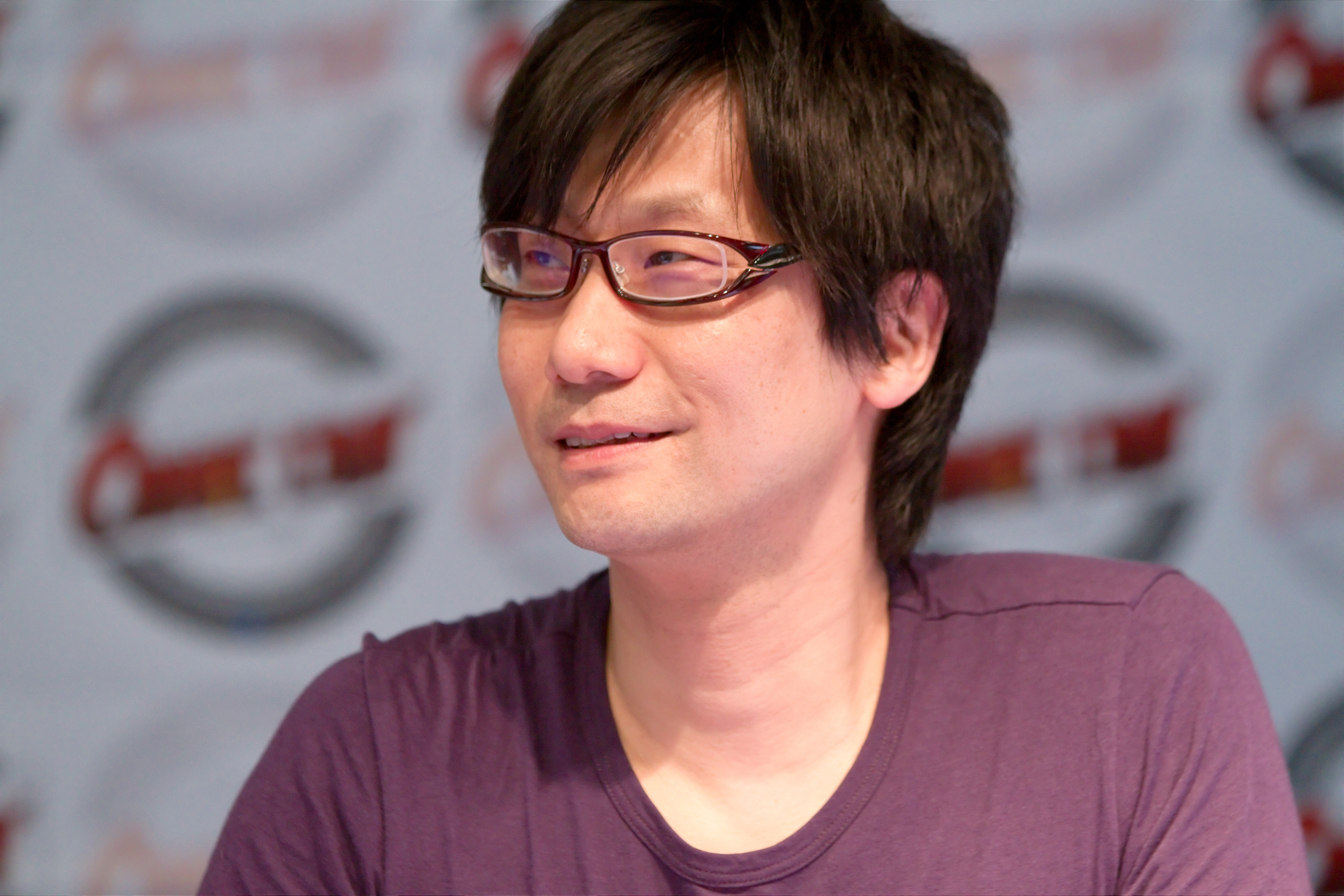
Hideo Kojima, the designer and co-director of P.T.

Kojima Productions used their game engine, the Fox Engine, to develop P.T. Hideo Kojima's intention when creating P.T. was to scare people in a unique way, as well as to deliver an interactive teaser experience instead of releasing trailers and screenshots of Silent Hills.

P.T. was designed to take players at least a week to complete, and Kojima intended the puzzles to be very enigmatic and difficult. Despite this, a few gamers reportedly finished the game within hours after the release, surprising him. Kojima intended for P.T. to be a mystery in order to make it a more frightening experience. There is little, cryptic, information given in the game on events that take place, and there are few clues as to how to solve the puzzles. He chose the corridor as the setting as opposed to "a ruin" because he wanted the teaser to emotionally affect the player regardless of "cultural background". Kojima elaborated that P.T. and Silent Hills have no canonical and direct relation, and that Silent Hills would have been enhanced by elements that were never in P.T. He based his concept of P.T. on horror films and other media that he found frightening. When creating the game, Kojima refrained from using graphic violence to build up suspense, as he felt that too many horror games rely on the trope. He wanted to elicit a more "genuine, thoughtful and permeating" type of fear.

A user was able to hack the in-game camera of P.T. to show that as soon as the player obtained the flashlight, the model of Lisa is tethered directly behind the protagonist away from the direction he is looking. This enabled the game to show fleeting shadows of Lisa and some of the sound effects associated with her that the player experiences throughout the game. The user discovered an unused scene showing Lisa's headless corpse lying in the bloody bathtub, that the player-character is modeled after Reedus throughout all parts of the game and not just at the ending, and that much of the world outside of the interior rooms is an incomplete but detailed map of Silent Hill.

== Release ==
P.T. was originally announced at Gamescom 2014 as a demo for an eponymous mystery horror video game. It was released on 12 August 2014, on the PlayStation Network. Instead of formally announcing a new Silent Hill game, director Hideo Kojima decided to release P.T. as a game demo from a nonexistent gaming studio called 7780s Studio. (Note: 7780s Studio refers to the area, in square kilometers, of Shizuoka Prefecture; a literal translation of the prefecture's name is "Quiet Hills", and in Japan, the Silent Hill series is often nicknamed "Shizuoka".) In September 2014, Sony announced during its pre-Tokyo Game Show press conference that P.T. had been downloaded over a million times.

=== Reception ===
The photorealistic quality of P.T.'s singular, tormented hallway lulls one into a familiar and emotionally disarming place. We've all been in a hallway like that. We've all wondered if something was around the corner. In P.T., there is.

— Patrick Klepek from Kotaku

The game received critical acclaim. David Houghton of GamesRadar+ praised it for its immersive, well-executed horror and for how the game's difficulty created online discourse: "By spreading out into the real world, by forcing solutions by way of hearsay, internet whispers, and desperate, rumoured logic, it has become its own urban myth." Eurogamer's Jeffrey Matulef wrote that, through its emphasis on "sound effects, visual design, choreography, and difficult to decipher enemy placements" over traditional progress, the game became immersive and terrifying. However, the puzzles in P.T. received criticism. Patrick Klepek panned the puzzles, describing them as an "exercise in frustration". Matthew Reynolds of Digital Spy wrote that the final puzzle was a "source of frustration" which lacked a clear solution. In contrast, Matulaf stated that, while the puzzles ranged in cleverness and difficulty, they added to the horror of the game by being emotionally "uncomfortable".

P.T. was also placed on some "best-of" lists in 2014. GameSpot awarded it the "Game of the Month" for August 2014. IGN's Marty Sliva chose P.T. as an honorable mention on his list of the best video game trailers of the year, describing it as "one of the most interesting, gorgeous, and terrifying" games he played that year. Another reviewer for IGN, Lucy O'Brien, described the game as "the most genuinely frightening interactive experience in recent years", making it her choice for game of the year. Giant Bomb gave the Best Horror Game of the year award to P.T., saying that "P.T. reminded us what happens when unlimited resources are thrown at a horror experience." P.T. won "Scariest Game" at Bloody Disgusting's FEAR Awards. The game also won Innovation in Game Technology at the 2014 National Academy of Video Game Trade Reviewers (NAVGTR) awards. Polygon ranked it as the tenth best game of the year, and Slant Magazine's staff ranked it as the eighth best video game of the year. P.T. has been cited as among the greatest horror games of all time.

== Themes and analysis ==
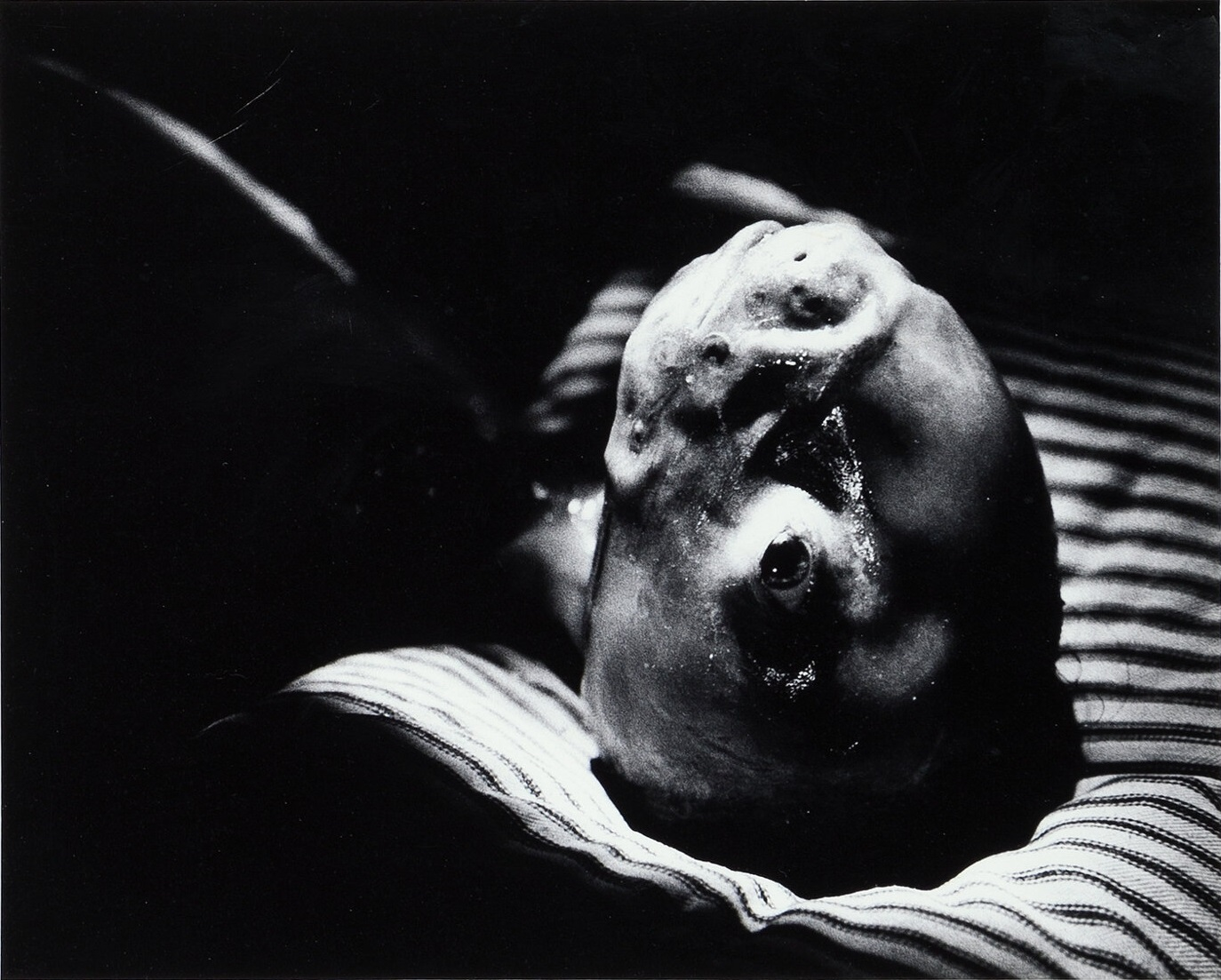
Danielle Riendeau from Polygon compared P.T.'s fetus in the sink (pictured above) to the deformed baby in David Lynch's film Eraserhead (1977; pictured below).

Reviewers have identified several themes in P.T. According to Eurogamer's Jeffrey Matulef, the game's main theme is "cyclical mental anguish", supported by the obscure and confusing nature of the puzzles. Danielle Riendeau of Polygon wrote that P.T. uses two primary themes from the Silent Hill series; "a sense of family trauma and domestic violence and the duality of the 'real world' and the nightmare world." She suggested that P.T. and Eraserhead shared thematic content, writing that both included a crying, deformed infant and that the film's protagonist journeyed from reality into a terrifying world.

P.T.'s ceaselessly looping hallway has been a source of critical discussion. Rob Crossley of GameSpot wrote that it induced "mild claustrophobia" and "a familiarity with your surroundings." He remarked that while the length of the first part of the corridor worked to create tension, the design of the second part intentionally prevented the player from being able to keep everything in view, causing the player to feel vulnerable. David Houghton of GamesRadar+ described the looping corridor as "the conduit for everything that it builds", along with saying that "it fills that structure with an unbroken feedback loop of 'horror' ... every time you leave is a monumental relief, and every simultaneous instance of returning is a moment of primal foreboding at how things might, and almost certainly will, escalate, compounded by the knowledge of the seemingly countless iterations before." Houghton felt that the game understood how to evoke horror by working "within the realm of psychology." Polygon quoted a game player who said that "P.T.'s greatest asset is its looping hallway," elaborating that it not only invokes fear, but also "curiosity, or a desire to know what will happen next." Matulef said that the claustrophobic and repetitive environment displayed in the game can hypnotize the player into a sense of vulnerability.

The majority of what is said and depicted in the game is open to interpretation, leading fans to develop and discuss theories about the nature of the events that occur in the game. Let's Players Voidburger and Bob from the video game related podcast The Grate Debate opined that the open-ended nature of P.T. is one of its greatest aspects and that many more of its details have yet to be discovered, examples being the changing colors of the flashlight's beam in the final loop, and the hints that the radio may be the main culprit behind the father's murderous actions. The podcast's YouTube channel released a video in August 2019, claiming that the game was not a teaser for the upcoming Silent Hills, and was actually a metaphor for Kojima's discontent with Konami and how he was allegedly treated by them, drawing allusions to key moments leading up to his leaving of the company in October 2015.

The game contains a Swedish line in the radio describing a radio drama from 1938 being true, which gamers suggested may be a nod to Orson Welles's radio adaptation of The War of the Worlds. This possible reference to alien invasions was noted as a continuation of a Silent Hill tradition of having secret endings that included aliens. Another theory commonly discussed is deciphering the identity of the player character. The fetus talking to the player character about his remembering moments "ten months back" seems to imply that he is the father who killed Lisa and the kids, although there are strong implications that the player character may be the protagonist that was to be in Silent Hills, as shown in the trailer following the ending of P.T.

== Media description ==
P.T. stands on its own. It's a novella or a short story, not a chapter out of a longer work. It's a form that hasn't really existed in video games before.

— Christopher Grant from Polygon

Journalists have expressed confusion about whether the game should be described as a teaser, video game, or demo. Despite ongoing debate, the game won awards for best trailer while also winning game of the month and best horror game of the year awards. While naming P.T. as an honorable mention for best trailer, Marty Sliva from IGN felt that P.T. was more of an "interactive experimental film/puzzle game". "Demo" has been one of the more common descriptions, though GameSpot was reluctant to categorize it as such. Despite it being commonly called a demo of Silent Hills, there is no evidence that it was going to be a part of Silent Hills aside from the reveal of the trailer and title after the end of the game. Hideo Kojima himself explained that it was not a demo of Silent Hills and described it as a "teaser" in a tweet.

Christopher Grant from Polygon likened P.T. to Pixar's animated shorts shown before its full-length animated feature films.

== Legacy ==
Since its release, P.T. has been steadily alluded to in other video games. Metal Gear Solid V: The Phantom Pain, another game directed by Kojima, includes several direct references to P.T., such as radio dialogue and sound used in the teaser. Additionally, the unreleased first-person survival horror video game Allison Road was heavily inspired by P.T.; Allison Road was to take place in a haunted townhouse in the United Kingdom and feature a male protagonist who attempts to unravel the mystery behind his missing family over five nights. In the demo, some wall graffiti directly alludes to P.T. by repeating a statement made in the game. The Park, a spin-off game from The Secret World, has a sequence inspired by P.T., and the horror games Layers of Fear and Visage were heavily inspired by P.T. as well. Kojima's Death Stranding: Director's Cut includes an Easter egg referencing P.T.

Den of Geek named the first time the player encounters Lisa as one of the most haunting images in horror genre.

In February 2016, the YouTube channel known collectively as "Oddest of the Odd" released a short film titled "Silent Hills P.T. in real life". The film draws heavily from its source material, as an unseen protagonist explores a two-story hallway loop in the first-person camera perspective. The short film was featured by IGN describing it as "incredible" while Game Rant's Alexander Pan described the video as being "complete with the demo's much-touted disturbing content and eerie atmosphere."

Resident Evil 7: Biohazard was compared with P.T. during its announcement at E3 2016 thanks in part to the Beginning Hour Demo, its first-person perspective, and its photo-realistic graphics. Jordan Amaro, the level designer of Silent Hills, was responsible for the creation of Resident Evil 7's design and setting, although he has denied that his work on Resident Evil 7 was influenced by P.T., claiming that he "wasn't part of the core team of P.T." and that "Silent Hills would have been quite different from Resident Evil 7 anyway".

Resident Evil Village has also been compared with P.T. due to the House Beneviento level's setting and puzzle-solving mechanics.

In September 2022, Silent Hill writer/director Christophe Gans, said that he had finished storyboards for the film's sequel and that it takes inspiration from P.T. Principal photography took place from April 2023 to February 2024. Return to Silent Hill, based on the plot of Silent Hill 2, was released on January 23, 2026.

=== Removal and remakes ===
Following news of the cancellation of Silent Hills, it was announced that P.T. would be removed from the PlayStation Network on 29 April 2015. Originally, it was reported that the demo could be re-downloaded, but in May 2015 it was no longer re-downloadable from the PlayStation Store. However, players who managed to redeem the game on their accounts before its removal are still able to redownload it on a PlayStation 4 through workarounds. Cancellation of the game led to criticism of Konami. Patrick Klepek from Kotaku stated "It's fine that Konami doesn't want to make Silent Hills" but that the deletion of P.T. was wrong since the demo had become part of gaming culture. Nick Robinson of Polygon described Konami's removal of P.T. as the "most irresponsible, cowardly decision possible," but that the subsequent unavailability had also made the demo "one of the coolest, most fascinating games in the history of our medium." After the cancellation, PlayStation 4 consoles with P.T. installed were listed on eBay for over $1,000; eBay later pulled the auctions down. The incident has been compared to the mass selling of iPhones containing Flappy Bird after that game's removal from the iOS App Store. Guillermo del Toro, the intended future director of Silent Hills, commented on P.T.'s popularity, speculating that there were people who still have a passion for the Silent Hill series.

On October 24, 2014, an Xbox user named Spawn N8NE remade the game both in and using Project Spark, titled as R.T., where users can download and play the game for free while using Project Spark. However, on August 12, 2016, the game was no longer available for download after Microsoft announced that Project Spark's online services would be shut down, and the game itself would no longer be available digitally.

On July 4, 2018, Qimsar, a 17-year-old developer and fan of P.T., remade the playable teaser for the PC and released it for free. On July 13, 2018, Konami shut down the project due to legal issues. However, Konami offered Qimsar an internship to work with its development offices.

On January 4, 2019, another remake of P.T. for the PC with VR and controller support was released for free by developer and fan Radius Gordello. In development for nine months, the remake uses the Unreal Engine 4 and keeps most of the original's assets, with the most notable change being an alteration to the game's ending in order to make it easier to reach. The developer pulled the game from its download page the same month. Initially, P.T. was transferable from PlayStation 4 to PlayStation 5, though Konami has blocked people from doing so in future system updates. On May 30, 2020, modder Ambient uploaded a mod to Steam Workshop that aims to recreate the game in Half-Life: Alyx.

In October 2026, an unofficial native PC port based on a reimplementation of the game's logic and graphics in C++ and Vulkan was released by Lorean Xavier. The project requires users to supply game data extracted from their own PlayStation 4 copy. It includes optional graphical enhancements, such as ray-traced lighting effects, and supports DLSS, FSR and XeSS upscaling technologies. The port also provides optional keyboard and mouse input, and a key bind command that outputs a single word phrase as an alternative to the microphone-based puzzle.
