= Desertion (disambiguation) =

Desertion is the abandonment of a duty or post in the military without permission.

Desertion may also refer to:

- Desertion (divorce), grounds for an at-fault divorce
- Desertion (novel), a 2005 novel by Abdulrazak Gurnah
- Mate desertion, a parent abandoning their offspring
- Spiritual desertion, the act of leaving a faith or religious group

== See also ==
- Desertification, a geological process
- Deserter (disambiguation)
- Abandonment (disambiguation)
