= OD (video game) =

Upcoming horror game

- Teaser poster featuring Sophia Lillis's character and subtitled "Knock"
- Developer: Kojima Productions
- Publisher: Xbox Game Studios
- Director: Hideo Kojima
- Producer: Hideo Kojima
- Designer: Hideo Kojima
- Writers: Hideo Kojima; Jordan Peele
- Engine: Unreal Engine 5
- Genre: Horror
- Mode: Single-player

OD (Note: "OD" is a reference to the codename of the game, which is also short for "overdose". The subtitle "Knock", stylized in all caps, has been used in specific promotional material but has been indicated to represent a portion of the experience rather than the title for the entire project.) is an upcoming horror game developed by Kojima Productions and set to be published by Xbox Game Studios. It is set to be directed by Hideo Kojima, who additionally serves as co-writer alongside Jordan Peele. Starring Sophia Lillis, Hunter Schafer, and Udo Kier in a posthumous appearance, the game will "explore the concept of testing your fear threshold, and what it means to OD on fear".

== Development and marketing ==
Hideo Kojima conceived OD while working on Death Stranding (2019). He pitched the game to numerous publishers, all of whom rejected it because they found the concept too unconventional and difficult to understand and execute. The only publisher that was interested was Xbox Game Studios. Kojima Productions and Xbox Game Studios announced their partnership for OD at the Xbox Games Showcase in June 2022. Kojima stated that the studio was working with Xbox and its cloud gaming technology "to take on the challenge of creating a very unique, immersive, and totally new style of game—or rather, a new form of media".

In November, approximately two and a half minutes of alleged concept footage leaked online. It depicted a character from a third-person perspective, visually resembling Margaret Qualley as seen in Death Stranding, walking through dark corridors with a flashlight. The scene ended with a "Game over" message, followed by the phrase "A Hideo Kojima game", and the title Overdose. In December 2023, Kojima Productions filed a Japanese trademark for the "Social Scream System", assumed to be an asynchronous multiplayer gameplay mechanic for OD, similar to the "Social Strand System" multiplayer mechanic from Death Stranding.

OD was officially revealed by Kojima and Jordan Peele with a teaser trailer featuring Sophia Lillis, Hunter Schafer, and Udo Kier at the Game Awards 2023. Kojima described the game as "avant-garde" and "something totally different", and that players would "either love it or hate it". He further remarked that he believed its true evaluation would come "10 or 20 years from now". Kojima stated that he aims to make the game "as scary as possible" and "go beyond the limit of the 'scariness'" compared to other horror games. On January 13, 2024, Kojima stated that he brought the production crew to Atami to view scary movies for reference material. Filming and scanning were suspended beginning in the second half of 2024 due to the 2024–2025 SAG-AFTRA video game strike.

In September 2025, a second teaser trailer, subtitled "KNOCK", was revealed during Kojima Productions's 10th anniversary event. The teaser showed Lillis's character performing a candle lighting ritual, until she gets immobilized in fear and ambushed by an unseen entity knocking and opening the door. Kojima stated the game would explore various fears, citing the sound of knocking as a personal example, while Peele would be addressing a "different kind of fear". Kojima revealed that OD will be an anthology horror game, with segments written by various directors he referred to as "the horror Avengers", including himself and Peele. He said that unlike his earlier games, Metal Gear and Death Stranding, which he described as "system-wise similar to other games", with OD the studio is attempting to "change the service model from the ground up". In December 2025, it was reported by Insider Gaming that some developers from Eidos-Montréal worked on OD before they moved to Japan to continue further work, leaving their Eidos positions.

In November 2025, Udo Kier died part way through the game's development. In a tribute statement, Kojima stated that Kier did not complete his voice and motion capture performance for the game before his death, leaving doubts as to whether his role would be re-cast or removed from the game entirely. However, in a promotional event held in October 2026, Kier was confirmed to still be appearing in the game through a dual-casting arrangement, where his character's voice and motion capture would be performed by another actor.

The game was confirmed to have resumed development by June 2026. It was also reported in the same month that OD was not going to be axed by Xbox with cuts made to games/game studios under its control. Xbox CEO Asha Sharma stated that the company would continue to support the game's production.

On September 20, 2026, Kojima spoke to The Washington Post and mentioned that some staff members from Physint were moved to OD after Sony dropped support for developing the former. On October 5, 2026, when Kojima spoke on the third season of the KOJI10 podcast, (Note: The podcast was produced by TBS.) he indicated that no further teasers or trailers were being released to give the game some mystery for those who want more information of the game.

On October 30, 2026, a new visual poster was publicly released, which was going to be exhibited at the BEYOND THE STRAND exhibit, showing Lillis with a white background behind her with a broom overhead.

Kotaku reported on November 12, 2026 that GoPro cameras were used to refine first person gaming experience. KJP partnered with TBS on the drama Sayonara, Maestro! in order to do 3D scans of the furniture with an entire film set, which would be used as game assets.

== Exhibits ==
Kojima Productions started an exhibition titled "KOJIMA PRODUCTIONS 10th ANNIVERSARY EXHIBITION BEYOND THE STRAND: The Odyssey of Creation and Endeavor", which will run from October 31 through December 20, 2026 at Azabudai Hills Gallery, which has production materials, concept art, documents, design proposals, and previously unseen prototypes related to OD's production.

== Reception ==
=== Pre-release ===
After the release of the teaser "Knock", several commentators noted its resemblance to P.T. (2014)—an interactive teaser for the video game Silent Hills, a cancelled installment in the Silent Hill series, directed and designed by Hideo Kojima in collaboration with filmmaker Guillermo del Toro. (Note: Attributed to multiple references:) Jez Corden of Windows Central deemed that "Knock" looked "ripped straight out" of the earlier work, while Oli Welsh of Polygon wrote that it "strongly recall[ed]" P.T. to him. Matt Purslow of IGN noted "clear parallels" between the two games, asserting that OD is "reusing and reinterpreting many of the themes, motifs, and designs that were established in [P.T.]. From ominous knocking to terrifying babies [...]".

At the 43rd Annual Golden Joystick Awards in 2025, OD was nominated to be the Most Anticipated Game.
