= Yoji Shinkawa =

Japanese artist and illustrator

- 新川 洋司
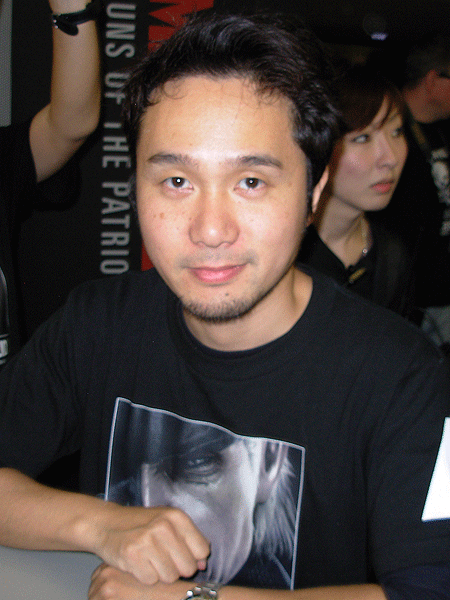
- Shinkawa in 2008
- Born: 25 December 1971 (age 54); Hiroshima, Japan
- Education: Kyoto Seika University
- Occupation: Illustrator
- Years active: 1994–present
- Employers: Konami (1994–2015); Kojima Productions (2015–present)
- Known for: Metal Gear; Death Stranding

Signature
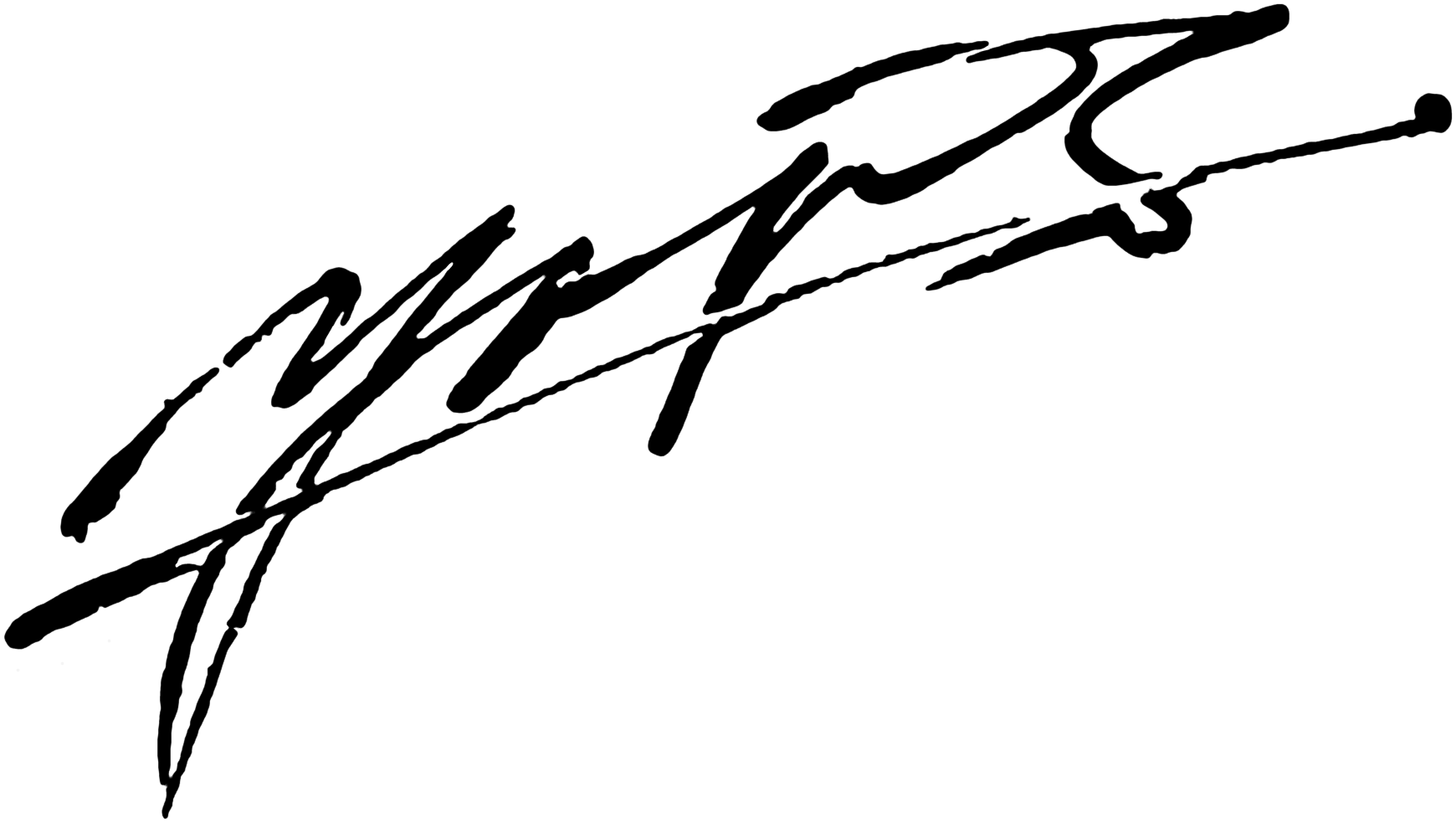

Yoji Shinkawa (Japanese: 新川洋司, Hepburn: Shinkawa Yōji; born 25 December 1971) is a Japanese artist. He is best known for collaborating extensively with video game director Hideo Kojima as the lead character and mechanical designer, and art director, for most of his games, including the entirety of the Metal Gear Solid franchise and the Death Stranding duology.

== Biography ==
Shinkawa and Hideo Kojima promoting Death Stranding 2: On the Beach in Lucca, Italy in November 2025

Shinkawa was born in Hiroshima on 25 December 1971. He began working at Konami after graduating from Kyoto Seika University. He first worked as a debugger for the PC-98 version of Policenauts. He moved on to serve as the art director for later console ports of the game, and as the lead character and mecha designer for Metal Gear series, closely working alongside series director Hideo Kojima. For 17 years, he served as the art director for all Metal Gear Solid games, from Metal Gear Solid (1998) up to Metal Gear Solid V: The Phantom Pain (2015). He additionally provided character designs for spin-offs Metal Gear Solid: Portable Ops (2006) and Metal Gear Rising: Revengeance (2013). After Kojima left Konami in 2015, Shinkawa also left with him to become the lead artist and character designer for the newly founded Kojima Productions, where he worked on Death Stranding (2019) and its sequel Death Stranding 2: On the Beach (2025).

Shinkawa's work on both the Metal Gear Solid and Death Stranding franchises has been consistently acclaimed, with specifically the art direction of the games regularly pointed out by critics as being one of their most iconic attributes.

In his work, Shinkawa was inspired by anime and manga artists like Yoshikazu Yasuhiko and Yoshitaka Amano, and western artists such as Frank Miller, Aubrey Beardsley and Willy Pogany. He drew inspiration from French artists such as Mœbius. Shinkawa used felt-tip pens, especially the Pentel Brush Pen, as well as Adobe Photoshop and Corel Painter. He is a fan of heavy metal, and artists such as Megadeth, Rage, Killswitch Engage and Yngwie Malmsteen.

== Works ==
=== Video games ===
Year	Title	Role
1994	Policenauts	Mechanical design
1998	Metal Gear Solid	Art director, character design, mechanical design
2000	Metal Gear: Ghost Babel	Illustrator
2001	Zone of the Enders	Mechanical design
2001	Metal Gear Solid 2: Sons of Liberty	Art director, character design, mechanical design
2003	Zone of the Enders: The 2nd Runner	Art director, mechanical design
2004	Fu-un Shinsengumi	Illustrator
2004	Metal Gear Solid 3: Snake Eater	Art director, character design, mechanical design
2005	Fu-un Bakumatsu-den	Illustrator
2006	Metal Gear Solid: Portable Ops	Character design
2008	Metal Gear Solid 4: Guns of the Patriots	Art director, character design, mechanical design
2010	Metal Gear Solid: Peace Walker	Art director, character design, mechanical design
2013	Metal Gear Rising: Revengeance	Character concept design
2014	Metal Gear Solid V: Ground Zeroes	Art director, character design, mechanical design
2015	Metal Gear Solid V: The Phantom Pain	Art director, character design, mechanical design
2017	Call of Duty: Black Ops III - Zombies Chronicles	Illustrator
2019	Left Alive	Character design
2019	Death Stranding	Art director, character design, mechanical design
2025	Death Stranding 2: On the Beach	Art director, character design, mechanical design
TBA	Physint	Art director, character design, mechanical design

=== Other works ===
==== Novels ====
- Urban Hercules (illustrations)
- Metal Gear Solid (cover illustration)
- Metal Gear Solid: Peace Walker (cover and interior illustrations)
- Metal Gear Solid Substance I: Shadow Moses (cover illustration)
- Metal Gear Solid Substance II: Manhattan (cover illustration)
- Metal Gear Solid: The Phantom Pain (cover illustration)
- Point of Impact (cover illustration, 2013 Fusosha Mystery edition)

==== Films ====
- Godzilla: Final Wars (monster and mecha designs)
- Pacific Rim (Poster design, Japanese release)

==== Toys ====
- Frame Arms/Frame Arms Girl (mecha/character design for Byakko)
- Project M (mecha/character designer for Takara Tomy)

==== Trading cards ====
- Magic: The Gathering – Kamigawa: Neon Dynasty (Satoru Umezawa)
- Magic: The Gathering – Special Guest: Yoji Shinkawa Secret Lair (Phyrexian Metamorph, Tezzeret the Seeker, Skullclamp, Solemn Simulacrum)

== Bibliography ==
- The Art of Metal Gear Solid
- The Art of Metal Gear Solid 2
- The Art of Metal Gear Solid 1.5
- The Art of Metal Gear Solid: The Original Trilogy
- Metal Gear Solid 4: Guns of the Patriots: Master Art Work
- Metal Gear Solid: Peace Walker: Official Art Works
- The Art of Metal Gear Solid V
- Visual Works of Anubis: Zone of the Enders
- The Art of Yoji Shinkawa Volumes 1-3
