= The Deserter =

The Deserter or Deserter(s) may refer to:

== Film and television ==
- The Deserter (1912 film), a silent film by Thomas H. Ince
- The Deserter (1933 film), a film by Vsevolod Pudovkin
- The Deserter (1970 film), a film by Burt Kennedy
- The Deserter (2008 film), a Canadian film by Simon Lavoie
- Deserters (film), a 1983 Canadian drama film
- "The Deserter" (Avatar: The Last Airbender), the sixteenth episode in the television series Avatar: The Last Airbender
- "The Deserter" (Star Wars: The Clone Wars)

== Literature ==
- "The Deserter" (poem), a 1916 war poem by Winifred Mary Letts
- The Deserter, a 1964 novel by Douglas LePan
- The Deserter, a 2010 novel by Paul Almond
- The Deserter, a 2019 novel by Nelson DeMille and Alex DeMille
- Deserters (novel), a 1996 novel by Chris Paling
- "The Deserter", an unpublished comics feature by DC Comics, with the first issue premiering in Cancelled Comic Cavalcade

== Music ==
- Deserter (song), a song by Matthew Dear
- Deserters (album), a 1992 album by the Oysterband
- "The Deserter", a traditional song featured on Fairport Convention's album Liege & Lief

== Places in Canada ==
- Deserters Peak, British Columbia
- Deserters Group, a group of islands in British Columbia
  - Deserters Island, an island in that group

== See also ==
- Deserters Canyon, British Columbia, Canada
- Desertion (disambiguation)
- Le déserteur (disambiguation)
