= Le déserteur =

Le déserteur (French for 'The deserter') may refer to:

- Le déserteur (opera), a 1769 opera by Pierre-Alexandre Monsigny and Michel-Jean Sedaine
- Le déserteur (1939 film) by Léonide Moguy, later retitled Je t'attendrai and released in the United States as Three Hours
- Le déserteur (1947 film) by Léonide Moguy, also known as Bethsabée
- "Le Déserteur" (song), a 1954 song by Boris Vian
- Le déserteur (2008 film) by Simon Lavoie
- Le Déserteur, a 1786 ballet by Maximilien Gardel
- Le Déserteur, drame en cinq actes et en prose, a 1770 play by Louis-Sébastien Mercier
- Le Déserteur, a 1966 novel by Jean Giono

== See also ==
- The Deserter (disambiguation)
