= Charlee Fraser =

Australian fashion model (born 1995)

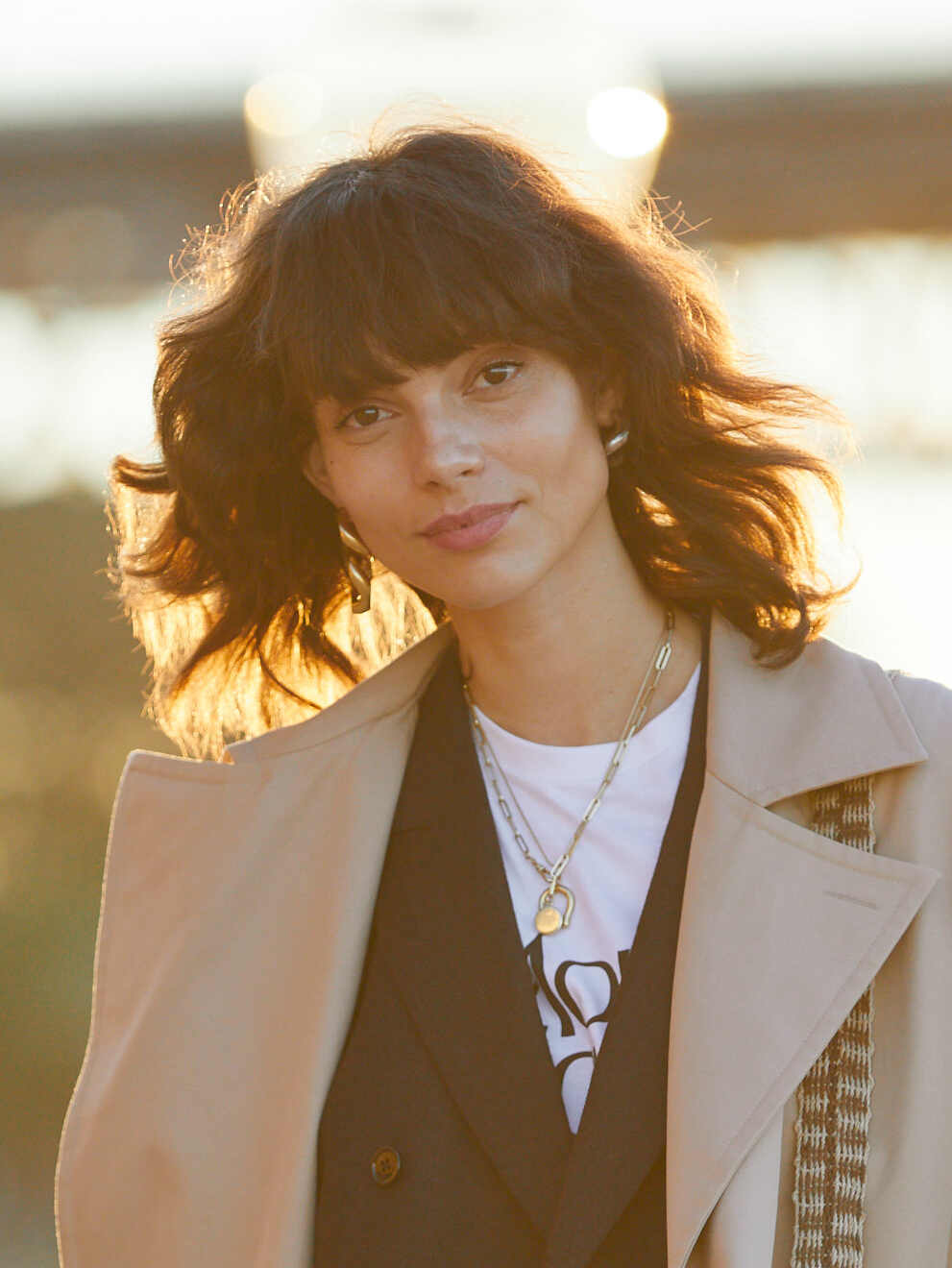
- Fraser in 2021
- Born: 25 December 1995 (age 30); Newcastle, New South Wales, Australia
- Modeling information
- Height: 5 ft 10.5 in (1.79 m)
- Hair color: Brown
- Eye color: Brown
- Agency: IMG Models (Worldwide); PARS Management (Munich)

Charlee Fraser (born 25 December 1995) is an Australian fashion model and actress. In May 2018 models.com ranked her as a "Top 50" model in the fashion industry. She was the most booked model of NYFW spring 2018. Fraser has appeared on the covers of Vogue, Harper's Bazaar, and Numéro. In 2023, she moved into acting starting with supporting roles in Anyone but You (2023) and Furiosa: A Mad Max Saga (2024).

== Career ==
=== Modelling ===
Fraser was discovered by a photographer in Newcastle, New South Wales. She modeled in Sydney Fashion Week shows before making her début at Alexander Wang F/W 2016, where famous hairstylist Guido Palau gave her and other models distinctive haircuts; that season, she also walked the runway for Derek Lam, Rodarte, Brandon Maxwell, Prada, Marni, Dior, Lanvin, Balenciaga, Givenchy, Mulberry, Céline, Stella McCartney, Tom Ford, Prabal Gurung, Chanel, Alberta Ferretti, and Chloé among others.

Fraser has been on the cover of Vogue Australia. She has appeared in Vogue, Vogue Italia, Vogue Mexico, Vogue Japan, Numéro, Russh, and Dazed among others. She co-stars in the Tom Ford "BOYS & GIRLS" cosmetics campaign.

=== Acting ===
Her first film role was in the sleeper hit romantic comedy Anyone but You (2023) filmed in her native Australia where she played the ex-girlfriend of Glen Powell’s character.

In 2024, she appeared in the post-apocalyptic film Furiosa: A Mad Max Saga, the prequel to the 2015 film Mad Max: Fury Road, as the mother of the titular character. Her performance in the film was hailed as a standout. In September 2025, Fraser was cast in Hideo Kojima's upcoming stealth game Physint.

== Personal life ==
Fraser is of White and Awabakal Indigenous Australian heritage; she is the middle child of three siblings.

== Filmography ==
=== Films ===
Year	Title	Role	Notes
2023	Anyone but You	Margaret	Film debut
2024	Furiosa: A Mad Max Saga	Mary Jabassa	

=== Video games ===
Year	Title	Role	Notes
TBA	Physint	TBA	
