= Death Stranding 2: On the Beach =

2025 video game

- Developer: Kojima Productions (Note: Additional work by Guerrilla Games. Ported to Windows by Nixxes Software.)
- Publisher: Sony Interactive Entertainment
- Director: Hideo Kojima
- Producers: Hideo Kojima; Yoshikazu Matsuhana; Riki Kataoka; Saki Isshiki; Kateryna Tarasova
- Designer: Hideo Kojima
- Programmer: Akio Sakamoto
- Artist: Yoji Shinkawa
- Writers: Hideo Kojima; Kenji Yano; Shuyo Murata; Kota Watanabe
- Composers: Woodkid; Ludvig Forssell
- Engine: Decima
- Platforms: PlayStation 5; Windows
- Release: PlayStation 5; June 26, 2025; Windows; March 19, 2026
- Genre: Action-adventure
- Mode: Single-player

Death Stranding 2: On the Beach (Note: Japanese: DEATH STRANDING(デス・ストランディング) 2: ON THE BEACH(オン・ザ・ビーチ), Hepburn: Desu Sutorandingu Tsū: On za Bīchi) is a 2025 action-adventure game developed by Kojima Productions and published by Sony Interactive Entertainment. It is co-written, co-produced, designed, and directed by Hideo Kojima. Serving as the sequel to Death Stranding (2019), On the Beach features the previous game's central characters, including Sam, Fragile, and Higgs, reprised by Norman Reedus, Léa Seydoux, and Troy Baker, respectively. They are joined by a cast consisting of Elle Fanning, Shioli Kutsuna, Luca Marinelli, Alastair Duncan, Alissa Jung, Debra Wilson, and Tommie Earl Jenkins, as well as the likenesses of filmmakers George Miller, Fatih Akin, Guillermo del Toro, and Nicolas Winding Refn, the latter two returning from the previous game.

Death Stranding 2: On the Beach is set primarily in Australia, eleven months after the events of the first game, in a post-apocalyptic world ravaged by otherworldly creatures. The player controls Sam Porter Bridges, a freelance porter, as he and his companions set out on an expedition across the Australian continent to connect isolated survivors and colonies to the wireless communications "Chiral" Network in order to save humanity from extinction.

Kojima began writing On the Beach some time prior to 2020. He reworked the narrative from scratch to reflect the effect of COVID-19 on the worldwide population. After the story was completed, hints of Death Stranding being developed into a series by Kojima Productions had been insinuated, before the sequel game was confirmed as in development by Reedus in May 2022. Death Stranding 2: On the Beach was announced in December 2022 alongside confirmation of the new cast members. On the Beach was released for the PlayStation 5 on June 26, 2025 to generally favorable reviews. A Windows port was released on March 19, 2026.

== Gameplay ==
In the game, the player must deliver packages across treacherous landscapes. The game is primarily set in Mexico and Australia.

Death Stranding 2: On the Beach is a third-person action-adventure video game with asynchronous online functions. It takes place primarily in Mexico and Australia, both of which are large open worlds that can be freely explored by the player. The core gameplay loop revolves around delivering packages to scattered preppers and survivors, and connecting them to a wireless communication system known as the Chiral Network. Players need to navigate difficult terrain, while balancing the weight of the cargo on Sam's backpack. Players will unlock vehicles early into the game, which allows them to travel through the world quickly. Vehicles can be customized extensively. For instance, additional batteries can be installed to extend its use, while gun turrets can be added for defense. The world is frequently ravaged by natural disasters such as earthquakes and sandstorms, which will affect the landscape and force players to pick alternate delivery routes.

Players are involved in rebuilding destroyed infrastructure and reconstructing roads and bridges. Eventually, players can construct a monorail system connecting isolated colonies, allowing them to transport a large quantity of goods quickly from mines to cities. The player's main hub is the tar-traversing ship, the DHV Magellan, which can be used as a place to rest, interact with Sam's companions, and complete VR training missions, as well as being a means to fast travel via the tar. Players may build helpful structures and signs using materials, which may be seen by other players and vice versa. The player can "like" other players' structures to show gratitude.

On the Beach has a greater focus on combat than its predecessor. Players can choose to engage in direct combat against enemies, use stealth tactics, or avoid enemy encounters altogether by choosing to navigate rougher terrain. Unlike the first game, weapons available are by default non-lethal, thus allowing more direct combat without having to worry about voidouts, devastating explosions that cause a game over. Sam has a large arsenal of tools and gadgets that allow him to attract or divert an enemy's attention. The game features a dynamic day-night cycle which affects enemy behaviors. As players progress, they can unlock enhancements from the Automated Porter Assistant System, which serves as the game's skill tree. The skill tree is divided into five categories: porter, combat, stealth, servicemanship and bridge link, which focuses on Sam's ability to deliver packages. Sam's attributes will gradually increase as players complete ordinary actions. For instance, the more packages Sam delivers, the better his delivery skills will become.

== Synopsis ==
=== Setting ===
The game is set eleven months after the events of Death Stranding. The United Cities of America (UCA), a nation built from the remains of the United States, is fully connected via the Chiral Network and the logistics company, Bridges, has become defunct with deliveries now being handled by the Automated Porter Assistant System (APAS) that uses unmanned delivery robots, putting human porters out of work. Transcontinental portals called "plate gates" begin manifesting across the world in areas with high chiral density, most notably one linking Mexico to Australia. The extinction event has intensified: the ghostlike creatures called Beached Things (BTs) are evolving, natural disasters are frequent, and the Australian continent is overrun by bandits and hostile robots called "ghost mechs".

Characters include: Sam Porter Bridges (Norman Reedus), a legendary retired porter; Lou, his adopted daughter; Fragile (Léa Seydoux), an ally of Sam and founder of the private company Drawbridge; Deadman (Guillermo del Toro/Jesse Corti) (Note: Del Toro provided the likeness; Corti voiced Deadman.), a Death Stranding researcher; Tarman (George Miller/Marty Rhone) (Note: Miller provided the likeness; Rhone voiced Tarman.), Dollman (Fatih Akin/Jonathan Roumie) (Note: Akin provided the likeness; Roumie voiced Dollman.), Heartman (Nicolas Winding Refn/Darren Jacobs) (Note: Refn provided the likeness; Jacobs voiced Heartman.), and Rainy (Shioli Kutsuna), members of Drawbridge who aid Sam in his expedition; the President (Alastair Duncan), leader of the Automated Public Assistance Company (APAC) which operates APAS; Charlie (Tommie Earl Jenkins), Drawbridge's mysterious benefactor; Tomorrow (Elle Fanning), an amnesiac young woman who possesses powers relating to the tar; Neil Vana (Luca Marinelli), a mysterious spectral soldier; Lucy (Alissa Jung), Sam's late wife; Amelie (Lindsay Wagner), Sam's adopted sister and the "Extinction Entity", a being manifested by the universe to trigger an extinction event; and Higgs (Troy Baker), the primary antagonist of Death Stranding who seemingly returned from the beach, the space between the afterlife and the physical world, to exact vengeance on Sam and Fragile.

=== Plot ===
Sam lives in peaceful isolation with Lou near the former US–Mexico border after deserting the UCA. Fragile tracks him down and asks him to connect Mexico to the Chiral Network using abandoned APAC terminals. As incentive, the UCA will pardon Sam for taking Lou, who is considered Bridges property. Though reluctant, Sam accepts, leaving Lou in Fragile's care. After successfully linking Mexico, Sam reaches a research facility where Deadman left behind a recording. Deadman explains that he discovered a mysterious anomaly in southern Mexico called a "plate gate", which acts as a portal to Australia, where survivors remain. He also reveals that Lou's BB identification number belonged to a decommissioned unit, meaning Lou was never officially registered in the UCA's system. Sam returns home, where he finds that his shelter was attacked by an unknown armed group. Fragile survives, but Lou is apparently killed.

A month later, Sam struggles with grief and Fragile invites him aboard her tar-traversing ship, the DHV Magellan, to travel through the plate gate and connect Australia to the Chiral Network. During the journey, Lou appears again as a BT-like entity inside Sam's BB pod. Onboard, Sam meets the crew of Drawbridge, including a mysterious figure known as the President, who explains that connecting Australia will activate additional plate gates capable of linking continents worldwide. While expanding the network across Australia, Sam encounters Higgs, who now commands powerful "ghost mech" forces that terrorize settlements. Sam also experiences strange 'tarfall' anomalies where he is teleported into battles against a spectral soldier named Neil Vana. After his first encounter, Sam discovers a chrysalis containing an amnesiac young woman, whom Fragile names Tomorrow.

Following repeated confrontations, Sam eventually defeats Neil and experiences his memories. Sam learns that Lou is actually his biological daughter, believed to have died years earlier with Lucy during a voidout. Lou survived because she was secretly taken by Bridges beforehand and designated BB-00, the first successful Bridge Baby. Neil worked for Bridges smuggling braindead pregnant women from Mexico to the UCA to supply BB programs. Neil tried to help Lucy and Lou escape, but both he and Lucy were killed during the escape, and Lou was secretly preserved. Following the revelation, Fragile informs Sam that his BB pod has been empty throughout the mission and that Drawbridge allowed him to hallucinate Lou to process his grief.

Meanwhile, Higgs lays siege to the final hub needed to complete the Australian network. Sam and Drawbridge fight through his forces and successfully activate the last terminal. However, the President betrays them, revealing himself as an amalgamation of thousands of dead human souls connected to APAC. He explains his intention to use the Chiral Network to isolate humanity within their beaches permanently, eliminating the threat of BTs by separating the living from the physical world. He also admits to reviving Higgs to create fear that would push survivors to accept the network. Charlie intervenes and reveals himself to be Die-Hardman, the former UCA president, who secretly altered Sam's Q-Pid to sever the President's connection to the network once it was fully activated.

Higgs returns and captures Tomorrow, revealing that she is actually the adult Lou, and that due to her connection to Sam and Amelie, Lou is the next Extinction Entity. Higgs plans to use her to trigger the Last Stranding and wipe out humanity. Sam and Drawbridge pursue Higgs to a beach connected to APAC. Sam confronts Higgs in battle, fighting him with Higgs's electric guitar. Lou manifests in a massive form and eats Higgs, severing his connection to the beach and ending the Last Stranding. Soon after, Fragile dies, revealing that her soul had been killed during the original attack on Sam's home but her physical form had remained alive long enough to protect Lou. Later, Sam witnesses Neil's memories and learns that Lou had survived the attack and was teleported to Neil's beach, where she was protected and encased in the chrysalis, aging rapidly into adulthood. With her memories restored, Lou reunites emotionally with Sam.

In a post-credits scene, an older Lou follows in Sam's footsteps as a porter and prepares to travel through a plate gate.

== Development and marketing ==
In March 2020, Norman Reedus, who portrayed the main protagonist, Sam Porter Bridges, alluded to the possibility of continued collaboration with Hideo Kojima, who wrote, directed, produced and primarily designed the game. On the Beach was revealed to be in development in May 2022, when Reedus participated in an interview with the outlet Leo Edit to discuss his work on the game. In response, Kojima posted a series of photos on Twitter, cheekily depicting him punishing Reedus for confirming the game's existence. In October, following a series of teasers shared by Kojima on social media, Elle Fanning was announced to join the cast for an upcoming Kojima Productions game.

Kojima unveiled the game at The Game Awards 2022. He shared that he had written the original story sometime prior to 2020, but decided to rework the narrative when faced with new story concepts that reflected the impact of COVID-19 on the rest of the world. The trailer additionally confirmed that Léa Seydoux and Troy Baker would reprise their roles as Fragile and Higgs, and that Fanning would appear in an undisclosed role. Shioli Kutsuna was announced to have joined the cast. Artist and mechanical designer Yoji Shinkawa and composer Ludvig Forssell were confirmed to return to their respective roles.

During the January 2024 PlayStation State of Play, Kojima revealed in a 10-minute trailer new information such as Fanning's character, special appearances by George Miller/Marty Rhone as Tarman and Fatih Akin/Jonathan Roumie as Dollman, as well as new gameplay. Filming and motion capture were completed by May 2024, with Kojima adding that the game was in an "adjustment phase" that would take about a year to complete.

The release date was announced with a trailer at SXSW on March 9, 2025. The trailer revealed the reprisal of Nicolas Winding Refn/Darren Jacobs as Heartman, the new castings of Luca Marinelli as Neil, Alissa Jung as Lucy, Alastair Duncan as The President, and Debra Wilson as Doctor, as well as Woodkid's role as co-composer of the soundtrack, his original song "To the Wilder" being featured in the trailer. On May 29, 2025, Kojima Productions announced the appearance of Hololive virtual YouTuber, Usada Pekora, as a cameo, playing as a "data scientist".

Approximately half-way into development, Kojima decided to re-write the script in order to make it more polarising after it performed very well with test audiences. Kojima explained to co-composer Woodkid:

We have a problem. I'm going to be very honest, we have been testing the game with players and the results are too good. They like it too much. That means something is wrong; we have to change something. If everyone likes it, it means it's mainstream. It means it's conventional. It means it's already pre-digested for people to like it. And I don't want that. I want people to end up liking things they didn't like when they first encountered it, because that's where you really end up loving something.

On May 9, 2025, it was announced that the game had gone gold, signifying that development had been completed. On June 8, 2025, a premiere event was held at the Orpheum Theatre in Los Angeles following Summer Game Fest, featuring a panel discussion, a live gameplay demo, and the announcement of Woodkid's soundtrack album.

Death Stranding 2: On the Beach was released for the PlayStation 5 on June 26, 2025. Special edition versions granted in-game and physical items, with pre-orders of these versions offering bonus digital items and early access to the game two days before it officially released. A Microsoft Windows port was announced during a State of Play on February 12, 2026 and was released on March 19, 2026, with Nixxes Software having ported the game and included features such as ultrawide monitor support, upscaling technologies, and frame generation. A PlayStation 5 update the same week added 21:9 support.

In July 2025, Kojima participated in a Death Stranding 2 event in Shanghai in Bilibili World, where he mentioned Chinese voice acting being added to the game as free DLC.

On March 19, 2026, the game was officially released in China.

== Music ==
Woodkid for Death Stranding 2: On the Beach

Soundtrack album by Woodkid
- Released: June 13, 2025
- Length: 57:19
- Label: Milan Records
- Producers: Woodkid; Tanguy Destable

The soundtrack was composed by French singer-songwriter Woodkid and Swedish composer Ludvig Forssell, the latter of whom previously composed the score for the first game and worked on Metal Gear Solid V: The Phantom Pain. After ten years of working as the in-house composer for Kojima Productions, Forssell left to tackle freelance projects. When he returned to write music for the sequel, he said his independence helped him to focus better. Forssell decided to make music that was "much more lyrical and melodic" than the first, with more "human facets". An album of Forssell's original score was released on June 27, 2025.

Woodkid was initially approached to create original songs for the game, following the death of Ryan Karazija of Low Roar, whose songs appear often in the first game. Woodkid worked in-studio and in-person at Kojima Productions in Tokyo across a span of three years composing new music alongside the development of the game. Many of Woodkid's songs are procedural, and dynamically adapt to the player's actions in-game. The released album condenses the procedural tracks, usually a number of hours long, into a few minutes each. The single "To the Wilder" was released alongside the pre-order trailer on 9 March 2025. Woodkid released his full soundtrack album for Death Stranding 2 in collaboration with Hideo Kojima on 13 June 2025.

The game includes songs, some original and some previously released, from the artists Low Roar, Caroline Polachek, Grimm Grimm, Silent Poets, Magnolian, Hania Rani, Chvrches, Daichi Miura, Gen Hoshino, Usada Pekora, and Kunio Miyauchi. The 1969 song "Raindrops Keep Fallin' on My Head", sung by B. J. Thomas, is used extensively throughout the game both as non-diegetic background music and being sung by characters in-universe.

== Reception ==
Reception

Aggregate scores
Aggregator	Score
Metacritic	89/100 (Note: Based on 152 reviews)
OpenCritic	95% recommend

Review scores
Publication	Score
Destructoid	9/10
Digital Trends	4/5
Eurogamer	4/5
Famitsu	39/40
Game Informer	8.75/10
GameSpot	7/10
GamesRadar+	4/5
GameStar	85/100
IGN	9/10
Jeuxvideo.com	17/20
Push Square	10/10
Shacknews	9/10
The Guardian	5/5
Video Games Chronicle	5/5
VG247	4/5
VideoGamer.com	9/10

Death Stranding 2: On the Beach received "generally favorable reviews", according to review aggregator website Metacritic. OpenCritic reported that 95% of critics recommended the game. In Japan, four critics from Famitsu gave the game a total score of 39 out of 40, with three critics awarding the game with perfect 10 on scoring.

Simon Cardy of IGN described Death Stranding 2 as "a more accomplished achievement in nearly every facet" over its predecessor, and that it is "an inventive journey packed full of both shock and awe, the sort of bold work that deserves to be encouraged". Scott Duwe writing for Destructoid said Death Stranding 2 has "more varied and improved gameplay than the original", said it is "one of the best-looking games ever made" and praised its soundtrack and storyline.

Reviewers also highlighted the game's presentation, performances, and atmosphere. Writing for The Guardian, Phil Iwaniuk called it a "hypnotising arthouse game" and praised its atmosphere, performances, and refined mechanics. In a more mixed assessment for GameSpot, Diego Nicolás Argüello wrote that the sequel was "good but not great", arguing that it was too focused on revisiting ideas from the first game.

PC Gamer's Windows review described the Nixxes port as visually strong, with multiple upscalers and generally high frame rates, while noting occasional stuttering.

=== Sales ===
Following the release of its Windows version in March 2026, estimates published by Alinea Analytics put lifetime sales above two million copies, including about 1.6 million on PlayStation 5 and about 425,000 in the Windows version’s first week.

=== Accolades ===
Year	Award	Category	Result	Ref.
2023	Golden Joystick Awards	Most Wanted Game	Nominated	
2024	The Game Awards 2024	Most Anticipated Game	Nominated	
2025	TIGA Awards	Action and Adventure	Nominated	
2025	TIGA Awards	Diversity	Nominated	
2025	TIGA Awards	Narrative/Storytelling	Nominated	
2025	TIGA Awards	Social	Won	
2025	Golden Joystick Awards	Ultimate Game of the Year	5th Place	
2025	Golden Joystick Awards	Best Visual Design	Nominated	
2025	Golden Joystick Awards	Best Audio Design	Nominated	
2025	Golden Joystick Awards	Console Game of the Year	Nominated	
2025	Golden Joystick Awards	Best Supporting Performer (Troy Baker)	Nominated	
2025	16th Hollywood Music in Media Awards	Score – Video Game (Console & PC)	Nominated	
2025	The Game Awards 2025	Game of the Year	Nominated	
2025	The Game Awards 2025	Best Game Direction	Nominated	
2025	The Game Awards 2025	Best Narrative	Nominated	
2025	The Game Awards 2025	Best Art Direction	Nominated	
2025	The Game Awards 2025	Best Score and Music	Nominated	
2025	The Game Awards 2025	Best Audio Design	Nominated	
2025	The Game Awards 2025	Best Action/Adventure	Nominated	
2026	ASCAP Composers' Choice Awards	Video Game Score of the Year (Ludvig Forssell and Woodkid)	Nominated	
2026	29th Annual D.I.C.E. Awards	Outstanding Achievement in Animation	Nominated	
2026	29th Annual D.I.C.E. Awards	Outstanding Achievement in Art Direction	Nominated	
2026	29th Annual D.I.C.E. Awards	Outstanding Achievement in Audio Design	Won	
2026	29th Annual D.I.C.E. Awards	Outstanding Technical Achievement	Won	
2026	53rd Annie Awards	Best Character Animation – Video Game	Nominated	
2026	24th Visual Effects Society Awards	Outstanding Visual Arts in a Real-Time Project	Nominated	
2026	16th Guild of Music Supervisors Awards	Best Music Supervision in a Video Game (Synch)	Nominated	
2026	16th Guild of Music Supervisors Awards	Best Music Supervision in a Video Game (Original Music)	Won	
2026	24th Game Audio Network Guild Awards	Audio of the Year	Won	
2026	24th Game Audio Network Guild Awards	Best Audio Mix	Won	
2026	24th Game Audio Network Guild Awards	Best Cinematic & Cutscene Audio	Nominated	
2026	24th Game Audio Network Guild Awards	Best Ensemble Cast Performance	Nominated	
2026	24th Game Audio Network Guild Awards	Best Game Foley	Won	
2026	24th Game Audio Network Guild Awards	Best Game Trailer Audio ("Pre-Order Trailer")	Won	
2026	24th Game Audio Network Guild Awards	Best Main Theme	Won	
2026	24th Game Audio Network Guild Awards	Best Original Song ("To the Wilder" by Woodkid)	Nominated	
2026	24th Game Audio Network Guild Awards	Best UI, Reward, or Objective Sound Design	Nominated	
2026	24th Game Audio Network Guild Awards	Best Voice Performance (Shioli Kutsuna as Rainy)	Nominated	
2026	24th Game Audio Network Guild Awards	Best Voice Performance (Norman Reedus as Sam Porter Bridges)	Nominated	
2026	24th Game Audio Network Guild Awards	Creative and Technical Achievement in Music	Won	
2026	24th Game Audio Network Guild Awards	Creative and Technical Achievement in Sound Design	Won	
2026	24th Game Audio Network Guild Awards	Sound Design of the Year	Won	
2026	26th Game Developers Choice Awards	Best Audio	Nominated	
2026	26th Game Developers Choice Awards	Best Technology	Won	
2026	26th Game Developers Choice Awards	Best Visual Art	Nominated	
2026	73rd Golden Reel Awards	Outstanding Achievement in Sound Editing – Game Dialogue / ADR	Won	
2026	73rd Golden Reel Awards	Outstanding Achievement in Music Editing – Game Music	Nominated	
2026	73rd Golden Reel Awards	Outstanding Achievement in Sound Editing – Game Effects / Foley	Won	
2026	22nd British Academy Games Awards	Best Game	Longlisted	
2026	22nd British Academy Games Awards	Animation	Nominated	
2026	22nd British Academy Games Awards	Artistic Achievement	Won	
2026	22nd British Academy Games Awards	Audio Achievement	Nominated	
2026	22nd British Academy Games Awards	Game Beyond Entertainment	Longlisted	
2026	22nd British Academy Games Awards	Game Design	Longlisted	
2026	22nd British Academy Games Awards	Music	Nominated	
2026	22nd British Academy Games Awards	Narrative	Nominated	
2026	22nd British Academy Games Awards	Performer in a Supporting Role (Troy Baker)	Nominated	
2026	22nd British Academy Games Awards	Technical Achievement	Nominated	
2026	World Soundtrack Awards	Game Music Award	Longlisted	
2026	Develop:Star Awards 2026	Best Game	Nominated	
2026	Develop:Star Awards 2026	Best Audio	Nominated	
2026	Develop:Star Awards 2026	Best Visual Art	Nominated	
2026	Develop:Star Awards 2026	Best Game Design	Nominated	
2026	Develop:Star Awards 2026	Best Technical Innovation	Nominated	

== Potential sequel ==
In August 2025, Kojima stated that he already wrote the story for a potential Death Stranding 3, but he says that he would rather let someone else direct and produce it instead of him.

== See also ==
- On the Beach – the inspiration for the game's subtitle
