= Allison Road (video game) =

- Developers: Lilith Ltd; Far From Home
- Programmers: Alex Frerich; Patrick Schnegg; Lukas Märki
- Artist: Chris Kesler
- Composer: Marco Genovesi [Missing_Horizon]
- Engine: Unreal Engine 4
- Platforms: Linux; Microsoft Windows; OS X
- Genre: Survival horror
- Mode: Single-player

Allison Road is an unreleased first-person survival horror video game. It was in development at Lilith Ltd, and was to have been published by Team17 for Linux, Microsoft Windows and OS X. It would have been a spiritual successor to P.T., the playable teaser for the cancelled game Silent Hills. Before funding by Team17 was secured, Allison Road had been in development by fans.

On 4 June 2016, Allison Road's cancellation was announced on its dedicated Twitter account. A post on the same account on 22 August 2016 stated that work on the game had resumed.

However, as of July 2025, there had been no updates about the game and is considered defunct.

== Gameplay ==
As shown in a video released by Lilith Ltd, the gameplay of Allison Road would have been similar to that of P.T., with a protagonist exploring an unfamiliar townhouse. Most of the objects in the house could be interacted with or inspected, and in the video, the player is shown being able to equip himself with bladed weapons such as a meat cleaver.

== Plot ==
According to the game's description, "You will take on the role of the unnamed protagonist who wakes up one day without any recollection of prior events. Over the course of five nights, it is your objective to uncover the whereabouts of your family, unravel the mysteries of the house, and face off against dark entities that are nested deep within the house, while the clock is relentlessly ticking towards 3:00 a.m."

== Development ==
Development of Allison Road used Unreal Engine 4.

On 1 July 2015, while the game was in pre-alpha development, Lilith Ltd released a 14-minute-long video demonstrating gameplay. In order to avoid revealing any of the game's story, the footage was created specifically for the demo video, and was not intended to be used in the game.

To fund Allison Road, Lilith Ltd initiated a Kickstarter campaign, with a goal of £250,000. The campaign was cancelled when Team17 agreed to publish the game. During the campaign, a release on the Nintendo Switch been expected, but Team17 did not commit to this.

According to their website, the developers were aiming for a release in the third quarter of 2016. However, on 4 June 2016, the game's cancellation was announced on its Twitter account. On 22 August 2016, the game's creator, Christian Kesler, announced that he would resume developing the game, once again working by himself. Development would be under the auspices of Far From Home, a new studio that he had co-founded with his wife.

As of September 2019, there had been no updates to the official website since 2016, and the game's Facebook and Twitter accounts had been cancelled. Kesler appeared to have worked for movie studios as a concept artist and matte painter in the intervening time.

On 22 February 2022, the soundtrack was released on the composer's Bandcamp account.

== Legacy ==
In December 2023, a sole developer under the name Hitori de Productions created a spiritual successor to Allison Road called Supernormal. Kesler gave his blessings to proceed with the project and even permitted Hitori to use Lilly's design in the game. Supernormal was released on Steam a month later.
