= Abandonment (mysticism) =

Term used by mystic and ascetic writers

Abandonment is a term often used by mystic and ascetic writers to signify the first stage of the union of the soul with God by conforming to God's will, for example in the work of Jean Pierre de Caussade, Abandonment to Divine Providence:

You do well to give yourself up entirely and almost solely to the excellent practice of an absolute abandonment to the will of God. In this lies for you all perfection.

Several recent Popes have referred to abandonment in their teachings. In 2011, Pope Benedict XV reflected that "prayer is not a reflection on one's self, but a complete abandonment to the word and will of God", and in 2013, Pope Francis spoke of Pope John XXIII's "daily abandonment to God's will" as "a lesson for all of us, and also for the Church of our time".

Controversies

Due to unlearned internet Catholic commentators confusing Catholics, there is currently a growing misunderstanding regarding abandonment to God, which is leading to an imbalance in the spiritual lives of individuals. The Will of God is our sanctification, meaning ridding ourselves of mortal sin, and as much venial sin as is possible in this life. When lay people mix up the notion that... 1) God's will is our sanctification, and 2) God has got a plan for me, there can be serious imbalances occur which means we can place ourselves in precarious and difficult situations due to a lack of knowledge.

First and foremost Abandonment to the Divine Will means abandoning ourselves to the fact that we must not sin; and secondly that God puts in our daily lives a myriad of scenarios (divine providence) whereby we can practice using the virtues so that we grow in holiness. Thirdly, rather than following random inspirations we must use the virtue of prudence so as not to place ourselves in precarious situations which can place unnecessary difficulties in our lives. Fourthly, only then can we understand that the situation we are currently in is part of God's plan. Finally, we do not have to remain in a cycle of suffering. The virtues were given to help in the daily activities of life. Assuming that someone must remain in a cycle of suffering because 'this is God's will' is not the reality. A spiritual director should be consulted for advice.
