= Silent Hills =

Cancelled video game

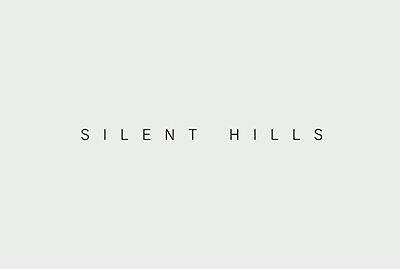
- Logo as seen in P.T.
- Developer: Kojima Productions
- Publisher: Konami Digital Entertainment
- Directors: Hideo Kojima; Guillermo del Toro
- Series: Silent Hill
- Engine: Fox Engine
- Platform: PlayStation 4
- Release: Cancelled
- Genre: Horror
- Mode: Single-player

Silent Hills (Note: Japanese: サイレントヒルズ, Hepburn: Sairento Hiruzu) is a cancelled horror game developed by Kojima Productions that was to be published by Konami Digital Entertainment for the PlayStation 4. It was in development from 2012 until its cancellation in 2015. It was to be the eighth main installment in the Silent Hill series, and was to be directed by Hideo Kojima and Guillermo del Toro.

Series publisher Konami brought Kojima onto the project in September 2012. The game was announced via P.T. (initialism for "playable teaser"), a critically acclaimed game demo released as a free download from the PlayStation Store in August 2014. P.T. revealed the involvement of Del Toro, along with Norman Reedus as the voice and appearance of its protagonist.

The game's development was questioned due to rumors surrounding Kojima's work with the completion of Metal Gear Solid V: The Phantom Pain, and his eventual exit from Konami. In April 2015, Konami announced that the game had been cancelled, a move that was criticized by journalists and fans of the franchise. Kojima, del Toro, and Reedus reunited for the 2019 game Death Stranding.

== Development ==
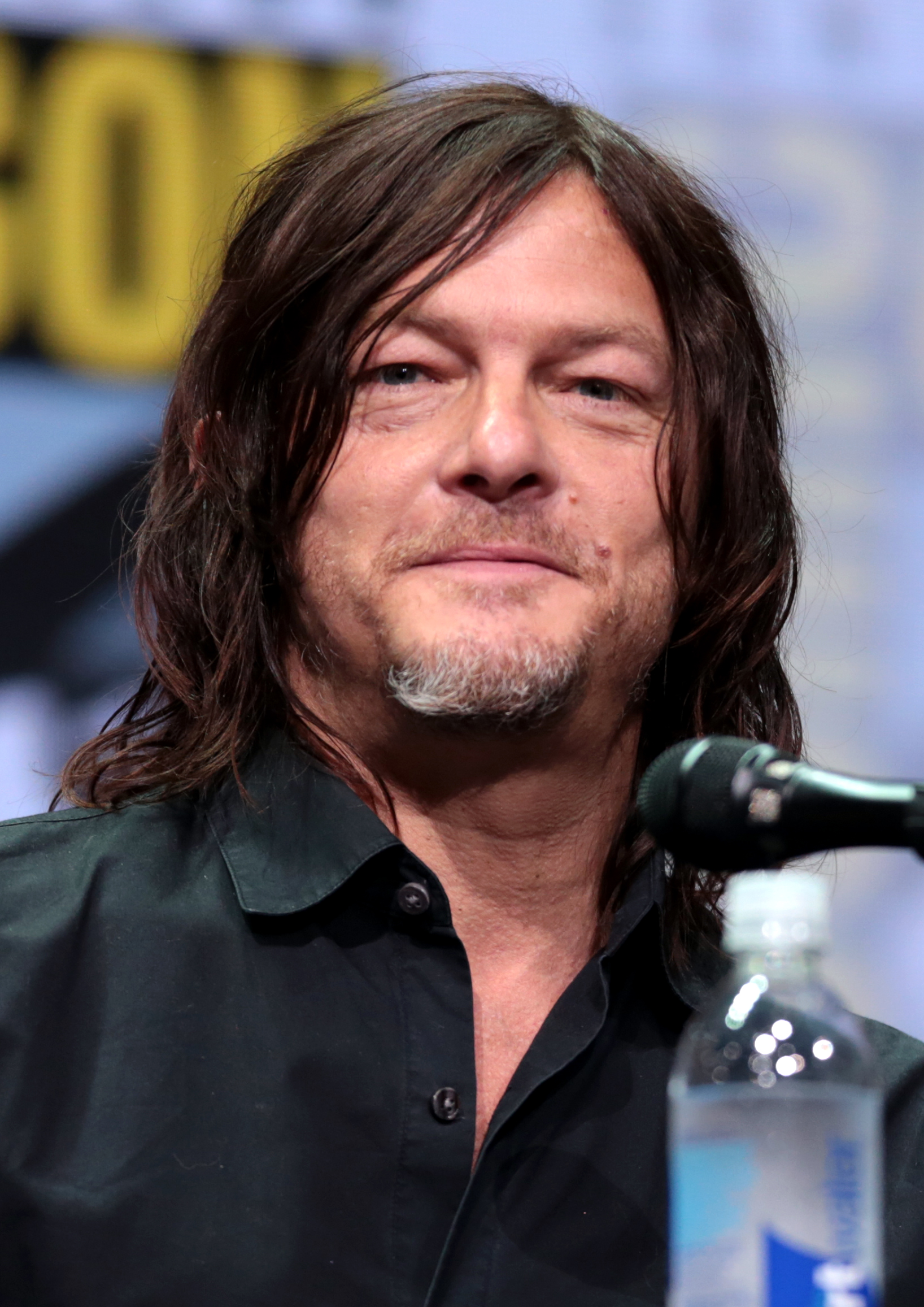
American actor Norman Reedus was to be the basis of the main protagonist.

In September 2012, Konami's president asked Hideo Kojima to direct the next Silent Hill installment. He accepted the offer with enthusiasm, and development began shortly thereafter, using Kojima Productions' Fox Engine.

When asked about the project, Kojima stated:

In the past I've mentioned Silent Hill in interviews, and as a result of that the president of Konami rung me up and said he'd like me to make the next Silent Hill. Honestly, I'm kind of a scaredy-cat when it comes to horror movies, so I'm not confident I can do it. At the same time, there's a certain type of horror that only people who are scared of can create, so maybe it's something I can do. That said, I think Silent Hill has a certain atmosphere. I think it has to continue, and I'd love to help it continue, and if I can help by supervising or lending the technology of the Fox Engine, then I'd love to participate in that respect.

=== P.T. ===
An interactive teaser for Silent Hills was released on August 12, 2014, as P.T. (Playable Teaser), marketed as a demo for a horror game by the non-existent 7780s Studio. Published on the PlayStation Network for the PlayStation 4 as a free download, P.T. uses a first-person perspective, in contrast to the usual third-person perspective often found in the Silent Hill series, and centers on an unknown protagonist who awakens in a haunted house and experiences supernatural occurrences; the only actions available are walking and zooming as the player character explores the continuously looping corridor. After the player solves the final puzzle, a trailer reveals that it is a "playable teaser" for a new Silent Hill title being directed by Hideo Kojima and Guillermo del Toro, with the protagonist portrayed by Norman Reedus. On 1 September 2014, Sony revealed during its pre-Tokyo Game Show press conference that P.T. has been downloaded over a million times.

P.T. received praise from video game journalists. GamesRadar's David Houghton praised it as immersive horror and wrote: "By spreading out into the real world, by forcing solutions by way of hearsay, internet whispers, and desperate, rumoured logic, it has become its own urban myth." IGN's Marty Sliva ranked it as an honorable mention on his list of the best video game trailers for 2014, and another reviewer for IGN, Lucy O'Brien, described the game as "the most genuinely frightening interactive experience in recent years." Giant Bomb gave the Best Horror Game award to P.T. in 2014. P.T. won "Scariest Game" at Bloody Disgusting's FEAR Awards.

=== Cancellation ===
In March 2015, sources reported that due to conflicts with Konami, Kojima and his senior staff planned to leave Konami following the completion of Metal Gear Solid V: The Phantom Pain. Concurrently, Konami announced a restructuring of its video game business, and removed references to Kojima and Kojima Productions from the promotional materials for its games. A Konami spokesperson initially denied that Kojima was leaving the company, and stated that he would still be involved with Konami and the Metal Gear franchise.

At a San Francisco Film Society event on April 26, 2015, assistant director Guillermo del Toro reportedly told attendees that Silent Hills had been cancelled. The next day, Norman Reedus also made statements on Twitter stating that the game had been cancelled. The same day, Konami announced that P.T. would be pulled from the PlayStation Store on April 29, 2015, and Polygon reported that an anonymous tip by a person familiar with the game's development had also confirmed the game's cancellation. On April 27, 2015, Konami issued a statement to Kotaku confirming that Silent Hills "would not be continued", but that they planned to continue the Silent Hill franchise. Fans upset by the cancellation later started a petition on Change.org asking for Konami to continue the project; as of 4 March 2016, the petition has received 194,279 signatures. In a tweet from Guillermo del Toro, he revealed that horror manga artist Junji Ito would also have been involved with the project. Cliff Bleszinski was also asked to work on the project, but declined, later explaining on Twitter: "I don't like LA, I love new IP, and I woulda fucked up SH".

During Sony Interactive Entertainment's E3 2016 press conference, the reformed Kojima Productions unveiled a new game, Death Stranding, which also features Reedus and del Toro. In the years since, rumours of the series being revived by a third party or by Kojima himself have been a source of both frustration and interest throughout the horror community. In 2021, a game called Abandoned was heavily speculated to be a part of the franchise; however, the developers denied any connection. Bloober Team also denied online rumors about a possible revival of the project under their oversight, later going on to develop the 2024 remake of Silent Hill 2.
