= Kojima Productions =

Japanese video game developer

Kojima Productions Co., Ltd.
- Logo used since 2015, depicting Ludens, the studio's mascot
- Native name: 株式会社コジマプロダクション
- Romanized name: Kabushiki gaisha Kojima Purodakushon
- Type: Private
- Industry: Video games
- Founded: December 16, 2015; 10 years ago
- Founder: Hideo Kojima
- Headquarters: Shinagawa, Tokyo, Japan
- Key people: Hideo Kojima (director); Shinji Hirano (president); Yoji Shinkawa (art director)
- Number of employees: 200 (2025)
- Divisions: Kojima Productions Amsterdam
- Website: kojimaproductions.jp

Kojima Productions Co., Ltd. (Note: Japanese: 株式会社コジマプロダクション, Hepburn: Kabushiki gaisha Kojima Purodakushon) is a Japanese video game development and film production studio founded in 2015 by Hideo Kojima, creator of the Metal Gear franchise. It is the spiritual successor to a production team inside Konami also known as Kojima Productions originally founded in 2005. The independent Kojima Productions has a slightly altered Japanese name (Note: Although both names translate to Kojima Productions in English, the Konami production team was named 小島プロダクション (with Kojima written in kanji) while the independent company is named コジマプロダクション (with Kojima written in katakana).) and is based in Shinagawa, Tokyo.

The studio partnered with publisher Sony Interactive Entertainment to develop and release their first game, Death Stranding, in 2019. That same year, the studio announced their plans to enter the film production industry. Their second game and collaboration with Sony, Death Stranding 2: On the Beach, was released in 2025. The studio is currently developing the horror game OD and the "action-espionage" title Physint with Xbox Game Studios, alongside co-producing three Death Stranding adaptations: a live-action feature film with A24, an animated feature film in partnership with ABC Animation and Lyrical Animation, and an anime television series in collaboration with E&H Production and Disney+.

== History ==
=== Background ===
The original Kojima Productions was formed as a subsidiary of Konami in April 2005, after the merger of several subsidiaries including Kojima's group at Konami Computer Entertainment Japan. The name of the team followed Konami's naming style used between 2004 and 2015. Other production teams include Pawapuro Production, BEMANI Production, Virtual Kiss Production, and Loveplus Production. The team had around 100 employees, but grew to over 200 for Metal Gear Solid 4: Guns of the Patriots. Kojima said the merger relieved him of business management and administrative burdens he had as Konami's vice president, and that as head of Kojima Productions he could focus on making games. While having a position on the Konami board, Kojima wanted to persuade the staff and invest the company in his idea. As well as developing Metal Gear titles, Kojima Productions developed the Fox Engine.

In March 2013, the company established Kojima Productions Los Angeles, the secondary studio in Playa Vista, Los Angeles. However, the studio was shut down as part of Konami's plan to restructure the company in 2015.

On March 16, 2015, Konami announced that it had restructured the game development operations to change the production structure to a headquarters-controlled system, "in order to establish a steadfast operating base capable of responding to the rapid market changes that surround our digital entertainment business". The Kojima Productions branding was quietly removed from company websites and buildings. A few days later, an anonymous Konami employee stated that Kojima and the studio's senior staff had planned to leave Konami in December 2015 following the conclusion of their contracts and the release of Metal Gear Solid V: The Phantom Pain. Konami denied that Kojima was leaving the company and stated that he would still be involved with the company and the Metal Gear franchise. Kojima affirmed that he was still "100% involved" in The Phantom Pain and was determined to make it the greatest game he could. In December 2015, the production team was nominated for Developer of the Year at The Game Awards 2015, but lost to CD Projekt Red. Kojima was reportedly blocked from attending the event by Konami's lawyers, requiring Big Boss's actor Kiefer Sutherland to accept the awards for The Phantom Pain on his behalf.

=== Independent studio ===
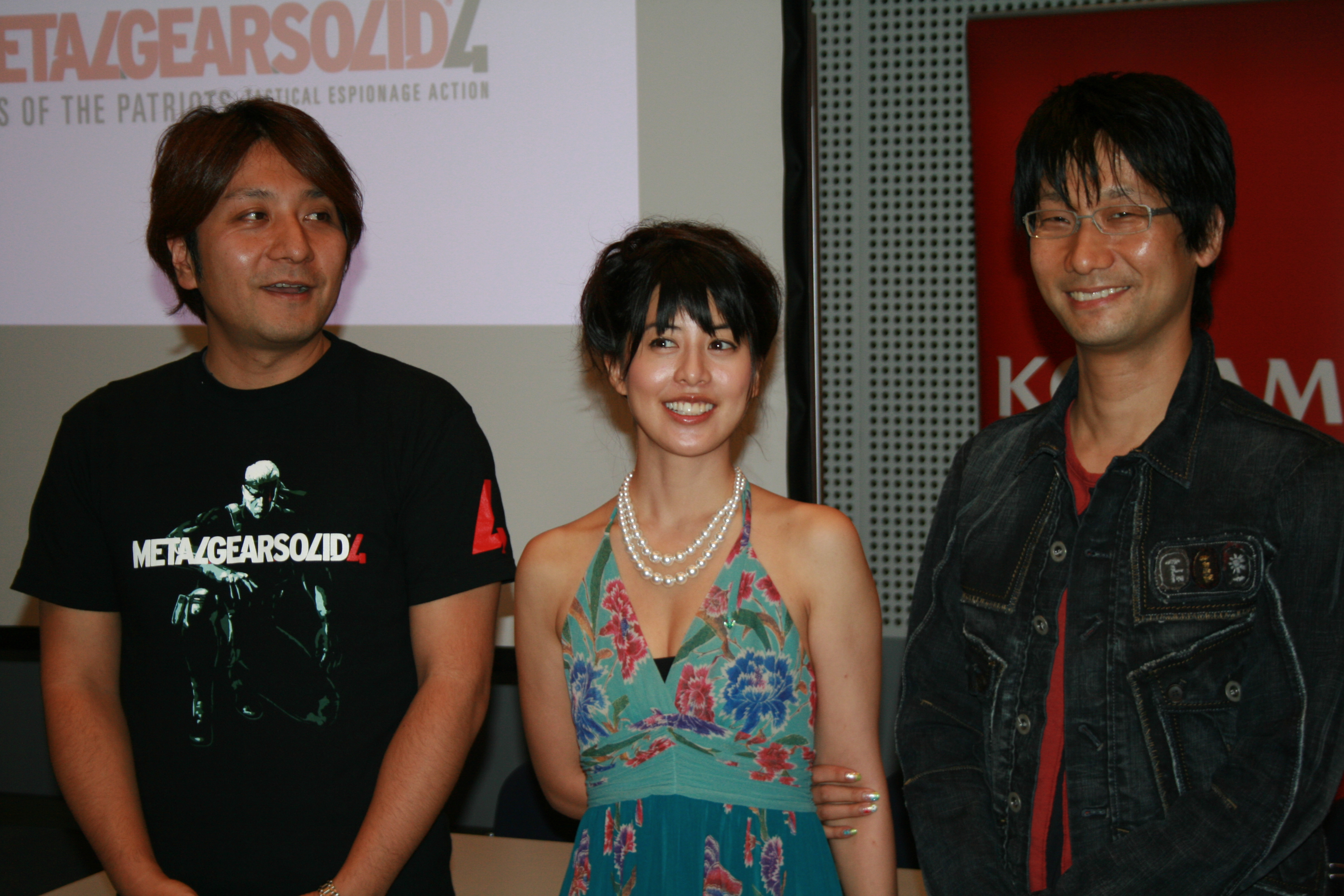
Kenichiro Imaizumi, Yumi Kikuchi, and Kojima in 2007

On December 16, 2015, in a joint announcement with Sony Computer Entertainment, Kojima announced that he would start an independent studio—also named Kojima Productions—alongside Yoji Shinkawa and Kenichiro Imaizumi. The studio announced that it would develop a new franchise for PlayStation 4. Kojima stated that he "will be taking on a new challenge by establishing my own independent studio, and I am thrilled to be able to embark on this journey with PlayStation, who I have continued to work with all these past years". In contrast to most Japanese development studios, which he likened to "armies" due to strict hierarchy and the lack of respect given to employees, Kojima sought to establish "an intimate kind of studio" that "feel[s] like it's family". Kojima visited Media Molecule and cited it as an inspiration. He was impressed by its work culture, particularly its number of female employees and relaxed atmosphere. He set a limit of one hundred employees for the studio, similar to Media Molecule. In 2016, the studio opened a small division in Amsterdam, near Guerrilla Games, who developed the Decima game engine that Kojima is using.

At E3 2016, Kojima unveiled a trailer to Death Stranding during Sony's pre-E3 conference. It was released by Sony Interactive Entertainment in 2019, and a PC version was released by 505 Games on Windows in July 2020. Imaizumi left the company in 2019. In April 2020, the office was temporarily closed after an employee contracted COVID-19.

In October 2020, it was confirmed that the company is working on the next game in development. On June 12, 2022, during Microsoft's digital presentation, Kojima announced that it had partnered with Xbox Game Studios to make a game featuring a "never before-seen concept" and leveraging Microsoft's "cutting-edge cloud technology". Kojima and Jordan Peele appeared at The Game Awards 2023, while revealing the game OD.

At The Game Awards 2022, Kojima officially announced a sequel to Death Stranding. A second trailer was shown during a State of Play presentation by Sony on January 31, 2024, confirming its subtitle, On the Beach, and a release window of 2025. That same day, Kojima announced a new project with the working title Physint, in collaboration with film studio Columbia Pictures. Described as both a "film and video game", it is scheduled to enter full development by the company after working on Death Stranding 2. In November 2024, Kojima Productions announced that they had reclaimed the intellectual property rights to Death Stranding from Sony Interactive Entertainment, and had planned to bring the game to additional platforms, coinciding with the immediate launch of Director's Cut on Xbox Series X/S, Microsoft Store for Windows, and the Amazon Luna cloud gaming service.

On December 31, 2024, Kojima publicly revealed that the video game strike resulted in actor scanning and filming for OD and casting for Physint being suspended.

Death Stranding 2: On the Beach was released for the PlayStation 5 on June 26, 2025. A Windows version followed on March 19, 2026. The studio marked its tenth anniversary in 2025 and said development would next concentrate on the horror game OD and the stealth game Physint. In 2026, Kojima said performance-capture and casting work for Physint, previously delayed by the 2024–25 video-game strike, would begin that year. The same year the studio collaborated with ASUS on a limited Republic of Gamers edition of the ROG Flow Z13, with design work credited to Yoji Shinkawa.

In September 9, 2026, it was revealed that the rights to Physint had been transferred to Xbox Game Studios, the publisher of Kojima's OD, after Sony informed Kojima Productions that they were cancelling the project in June 2026. Xbox and Kojima Productions will also collaborate on film and television and projects.

At Tokyo Game Show 2026 Kojima has revealed the new official poster for Physint and the lead protagonist is Bill Skarsgård. Other casts announced so far are Charlee Fraser, Ma Dong-seok, and Minami Hamabe with more characters to come.

=== Film production ===
In November 2019, Kojima Productions announced their plans to make film adaptations. Two years later, in November 2021, the studio announced that it would open a new business division for films and television series in Los Angeles. In December 2022, it was announced that Kojima Productions was partnering with Hammerstone Studios to produce a film based on Death Stranding, with Hammerstone providing funding. It was also announced that A24 is working on the film.

== Games ==
Year	Title	Platform(s)	Publisher(s)	Ref.
2019	Death Stranding	PlayStation 4, Windows	Sony Interactive Entertainment, 505 Games	
2021	Death Stranding: Director's Cut	PlayStation 5, Windows, macOS, iOS, iPadOS, Xbox Series X/S, Amazon Luna	Sony Interactive Entertainment, 505 Games	
2025	Death Stranding 2: On the Beach	PlayStation 5, Windows	Sony Interactive Entertainment	
2026	Death Stranding Odradek	IOS, Android	Niantic Spatial	
TBA	OD	TBA	Xbox Game Studios	
TBA	Physint (Note: Working title)	TBA	Xbox Game Studios	

== Filmography ==
=== Films ===
Year	Title	Notes	Ref.
2024	Hideo Kojima: Connecting Worlds	Documentary; co-production with PlayStation Studios and Filmworks; distributed by Disney+	
TBA	Untitled Death Stranding film	Co-production with Hammerstone Studios, Square Peg, and A24	
TBA	Death Stranding: Mosquito	Animated film; co-production with ABC Animation and Lyrical Animation	

=== Series ===
Year	Title	Notes	Ref.
2027	Death Stranding: Isolations	Animated show; co-production with E&H Production; distributed by Disney+	
