= The End (Metal Gear) =

Metal Gear antagonist

- Metal Gear character
- The End in Metal Gear Solid Delta: Snake Eater (2025)
- First game: Metal Gear Solid 3: Snake Eater (2004)
- Created by: Hideo Kojima
- Voiced by: EN: J. Grant Albrecht; JA: Osamu Saka

The End (Japanese: ジ・エンド, Hepburn: Ji Endo) is a fictional character introduced in the 2004 video game Metal Gear Solid 3: Snake Eater. He also appears in the game's 2025 remake, Metal Gear Solid Delta: Snake Eater, and has a cameo in the 2010 game Metal Gear Solid: Peace Walker. Designed by series creator Hideo Kojima, he is one of the game's secondary antagonists and part of the Cobra Unit, an elite spec ops force under the command of a legendary soldier known as The Boss. The protagonist, Naked Snake, engages in battle with him, where The End fights him by hiding and sniping him. If the player waits a real-world week's span of time, The End will die of old age. Critics have called the battle well-designed, and cited the secret method of defeating The End as a memorable moment of metafiction in video gaming.

== Concept and design ==
The End and the fight between him and the protagonist were created by Hideo Kojima. Kojima was inspired to make a fight like this due to his interest in making new styles of boss fights in Metal Gear Solid 3. He wanted the fight to be as close to a real-life sniper battle as it could be, and would play out over two weeks. The fight was meant to take place across multiple map areas, but this was changed to only one map due to balancing issues. He identified The End as the most representative part of the game to represent the game's open-ended gameplay.

The End has a pet Alexandrine parakeet who can alert him to Snake's presence. He is the most merciful member of the Cobra Unit, refusing to kill the player under any circumstances, and solely using tranquilizer darts for his rifle. If Snake is defeated, The End will simply throw him in a jail cell.

== Appearances ==
The End first appears in Metal Gear Solid 3: Snake Eater, where he serves as a secondary antagonist working for the primary antagonist, The Boss. Born in the early 1860s, The End was once a pioneering figure known as the "father of modern sniping", his main weakness being his extremely advanced age at the time the game is set. He spends most of his time in a wheelchair hardly moving and conserving his energy, but is unusually spry on the battlefield, capable of fighting like someone far younger. The only member of the unit without an emotion-based codename, it is explained in the game that "The End" signifies "true oblivion". The End is later encountered in an open-ended boss fight in which he hides in certain locations attempting to snipe the player character, Naked Snake, and the unusual methods of winning the fight. While the player can hunt down The End using various methods and win in a conventional manner, it is also possible to attack The End while he is in his wheelchair beforehand and avoid the fight entirely. Furthermore, an Easter egg allows the player to wait a full week during the boss battle, or set the system clock forward by that amount, to cause The End to die of old age.

== Critical reception ==
The slow-paced sniper duel nature of The End's boss fight was called unique by critics. Sarah Fimm of The Mary Sue described the fight as not only the first of its kind, but her favorite in execution, calling it a "stroke of genius". Steve Haske of VICE stated that it was "a fight that broke all the rules" due to its length and the difficulty in remaining out in the open, as well as The End's ability to photosynthesize and therefore regenerate. GamesRadar+ called it "unbelievably tense" and "filled with uncertainty".

The battle also received praise for the numerous ways in which The End could be tracked. Chad Concelmo of Destructoid noted that Naked Snake could use thermal goggles (to see The End through the underbrush), the directional microphone, or watch for The End's parrot to fly away. Fimm additionally noted that the player could steal The End's camouflage so that he would be easier to spot later, or sneak up behind him. The AI used in the battle was described as highly advanced, with Concelmo observing that The End was able to wait for hours to ambush Snake.

The End's potential death from old age got particular notice, with Concelmo calling it "awesome" and denoting Kojima's skill at breaking the fourth wall, and Fimm characterizing it as a "stroke of genius". Ted Litchfield of PC Gamer said that he was "positively tickled" that the Easter egg was recreated in Delta. However, Leigh Alexander, writing in Game Developer, criticized the option to skip the fight in this manner as something "no one who loves a breathtaking boss battle" would attempt to do. Haske also said that "a proper encounter was best" due to the humorous nature of his death, in which he "fumble[s] his dying soliloquy by way of a slow-motion shot of false teeth flying toward the screen".
