= MGO =

MGO may refer to:

== Science and technology ==
- Magnesium oxide (chemical formula MgO)
- Methylglyoxal, an organic compound
- Marine gas oil, a fuel oil

== Other uses ==
- Master-General of the Ordnance, British military position before 1855
- Metal Gear Online or MGO, a series of online modes throughout the Metal Gear series
  - Metal Gear Online 1, the online mode for Metal Gear Solid 3: Subsistence
    - Metal Gear Online Portable Ops, the first expansion of the mode in Metal Gear Solid: Portable Ops
    - Metal Gear Online Portable Ops Plus, the second expansion for the mode in Metal Gear Portable Ops Plus
  - Metal Gear Online 2, the online mode for Metal Gear Solid 4: Guns of the Patriots and later as Metal Gear Online
  - Metal Gear Online Peace Walker, the online mode for Metal Gear Solid: Peace Walker
  - Metal Gear Online 3, the online mode for Metal Gear Solid V: The Phantom Pain
