= Heather Halley =

American actress

- Born: September 28, 1969 (age 55)
- Occupation: Actress

Heather Halley (born September 28, 1969) is an American film, television, stage and voice actress. She is perhaps best known as the English voice of Para-Medic in the Metal Gear series and was an announcer for several awards ceremonies, including the 59th Grammy Awards, the 4th and 5th Spike Video Game Awards, and the 10th Nickelodeon Kids' Choice Awards. Halley has also worked on voice work, including the web series Terminator Salvation: The Machinima Series.

== Voice acting career ==
=== Anime ===
- Honey and Clover - Kaoru Morita, Hagumi Hanamoto
- Honey and Clover II - Hagumi Hanamoto

=== Web series ===
- Terminator Salvation: The Machinima Series – Various voices

=== Video games ===
- Betty Boop Dance Card - Betty Boop
- Dead Rising 3 - Kyla, additional voices
- EverQuest II - Additional voices
- Final Fantasy XIV - Various
- Fire Emblem Heroes - Mirabilis
- Metal Gear Solid 3: Snake Eater, Metal Gear Solid 3: Subsistence, Metal Gear Solid: Portable Ops - Para-Medic
- Rogue Galaxy - Angela Seas, Miyoko
- Shadow of Rome - Iris, additional voices
- Soulcalibur IV, Soulcalibur: Broken Destiny, Soulcalibur VI - Cassandra Alexandra
- Tales of Legendia - Chloe Valens (uncredited)
- The 3rd Birthday - Additional voices
