= Metal Gear Solid: Social Ops =

2012 video game

- Developer: GREE
- Publisher: Konami
- Producer: Hideo Kojima
- Series: Metal Gear
- Engine: Unity
- Platforms: iOS, Android
- Release: JP: December 6, 2012
- Genres: Action, stealth
- Modes: Single-player, multiplayer

Metal Gear Solid: Social Ops (Note: Japanese: METAL GEAR SOLID SOCIAL OPS(メタルギア ソリッド ソーシャル・オプス), Hepburn: Metaru Gia Soriddo Sōsharu Opusu) is a 2012 defunct mobile game, an entry in the Metal Gear stealth action video game series. It was released in Japan on December 6, 2012. The publisher Konami announced that the game would shut down on December 13, 2013.

== Development ==
The game was confirmed at the Metal Gear 25th anniversary event on August 30, 2012. Several characters and mechs from the Metal Gear series were shown. A promotional image was released depicting characters from Metal Gear Solid 3: Snake Eater, Metal Gear Solid 4: Guns of the Patriots and Metal Gear Solid: Peace Walker. The main game was free, with an ability to purchase DLC content.
