= David A. Thomas (voice actor) =

American actor

- Born: David Allen Thomas Jr. July 15, 1955 (age 70)
- Other name: Robert Matthews
- Occupations: Voice actor, painter
- Years active: 1978–present

David Allen Thomas Jr. (born July 15, 1955) is an American voice actor and painter. He is also known as Dave Thomas.

He is known for the voice of The Sorrow in Metal Gear Solid 3: Snake Eater/Metal Gear Solid 3: Subsistence and Echo in Red Faction 2. He started his career in 1981 as a soldier in a TV version of Othello.

== Filmography ==
=== Animation ===
- As Told By Ginger – Farmer Don
- Cowboy Bebop – Gren (credited as Robert Matthews)
- Royal Space Force: The Wings of Honnêamise – Shiro (credited as Robert Matthews)
- Teknoman Blade – Blade/Nick Carter/Teknoman Blade
- Fast & Furious Spy Racers – Cleve Kelso (2019–2021) (Recurring, season 3; Guest, season 1)

=== Video game ===
- Chaos Legion – The Old Man/Intelligencer
- Diablo II – Barbarian
- Enter the Matrix – Additional voices
- Fight Club – Irvin
- Freedom Fighters – Additional voices
- Freedom: First Resistance – Vickers/Pieter PK/Rodney
- Gabriel Knight 3: Blood of the Sacred, Blood of the Damned – Detective Mosely
- Lionheart – Additional voices
- Metal Gear Solid 3: Snake Eater – The Sorrow/Premier Nikita Khrushchev
- Metal Gear Solid 3: Subsistence – The Sorrow/Chairman Nikita Khrushchev
- Might and Magic: World of Xeen – Additional voices
- Red Faction II – Echo
- The Incredible Hulk: Ultimate Destruction – General Thunderbolt Ross
