= Misa Watanabe =

Japanese voice actress

- 渡辺 美佐
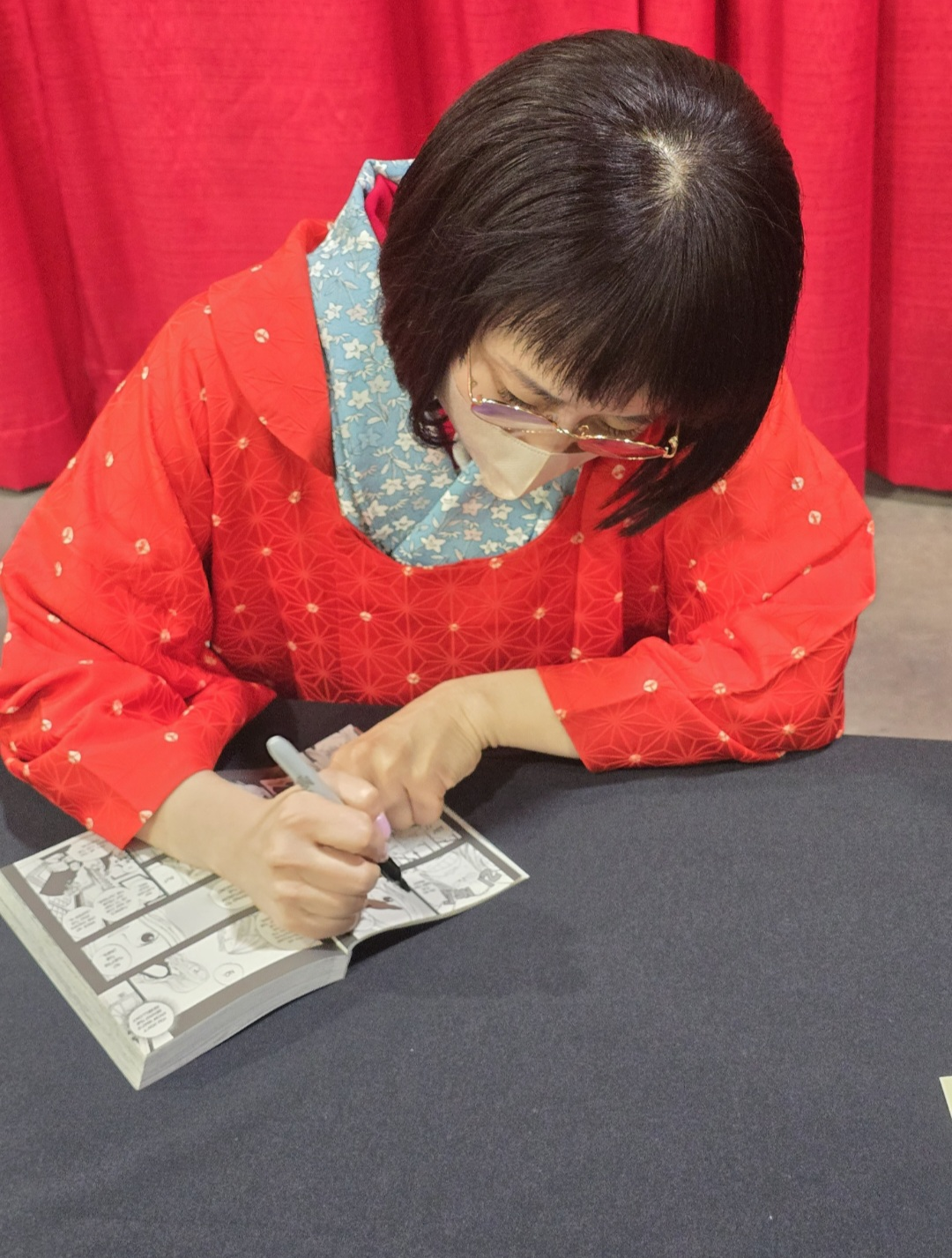
- Misa Watanabe signing a One Piece manga volume at Anime Weekend Atlanta 2024.
- Born: Tokyo, Japan
- Occupations: Voice actress; narrator
- Years active: 1991–present
- Agent: Aoni Production
- Height: 161 cm (5 ft 3 in)

Misa Watanabe (渡辺 美佐, Watanabe Misa) is a Japanese voice actress and narrator from Tokyo, Japan. She is well known for voicing Nefertari Vivi in One Piece.

== Filmography ==
=== Television Animation ===
1990s

- Magical Princess Minky Momo (1991) – Mother
- Baby and Me (1996) – Yukako Enoki
- Master Keaton (1998) – Anna

2000s

- Detective Conan (2000) - Yumiko Niikura
- Ghost Stories (2000) – Momoko's Mother
- Saiyuki (2000) – Kanzeon Bosatsu
- Geneshaft – (2001) Ann
- One Piece – (2001) Nefertari Vivi
- X/1999 – Tokiko Magami
- Naruto – (2002) Tsunami, Tsukiko Kagetsu
- Ashita no Nadja (2003) – Marie
- Absolute Boy (2005) – Hana Tokimiya
- Basilisk (2005) – Akeginu
- Demashita! Powerpuff Girls Z (2006) – Kiyoko Gotokuji
- Air Gear (2006) – Kyo
- Ergo Proxy (2006) – Swan
- Hataraki Man (2006) – Midoriko Shirakawa
- Dinosaur King (2007) – Ursula
- Higurashi no Naku Koro ni (2006-2007) – Rina Mamiya
- Fresh Pretty Cure! (2009) – Northa

2010s

- Sailor Moon Crystal (2014) – Queen Beryl
- World Trigger (2015) – Nozomi Kako

2020s

- Higurashi no Naku Koro Ni Sotsu (2021) - Rina Mamiya
- Sakamoto Days (2027) - Etsuko Satoda

Unknown date

- Fair, then Partly Piggy – Announcer Yadama (the "Weather Lady")
- Otogi-Jushi Akazukin – Cendrillon
- Tales Of Symphonia: The United World – Martel
- Viewtiful Joe – Diana

=== OVA ===
- Interlude (2004) – Miyako Saegusa
- Mobile Suit Gundam Unicorn (2010) – Liam Borrinea

=== Film Animation ===
- Episode of Alabasta: The Desert Princess and the Pirates (2007) – Nefertari Vivi

=== Video games ===
- Grandia II (2000) – Selene
- Ico (2001) – Queen
- From TV Animation - One Piece: Grand Battle! 2 (2002) – Vivi
- Everybody's Golf (2003) – Marion
- Tales of Symphonia (2003) – Martel
- Ace Combat 5: The Unsung War (2004) – Nastasya Vasilievna Obertas
- Ace Combat Zero: The Belkan War (2006) – Marcera Vasquez
- Metal Gear Solid 3: Snake Eater (2004) – EVA
- Metal Gear Solid: Portable Ops (2006) – EVA
- Warriors: Legends of Troy (2011) – Penthesilea
- JoJo's Bizarre Adventure: All Star Battle (2013) – Gold Experience Requiem
- JoJo's Bizarre Adventure: Eyes of Heaven (2016) – Gold Experience Requiem
- Super Robot Wars OG: The Moon Dwellers (2016) – XN-L
- Persona 5 Strikers (2020) -- EMMA

=== Tokusatsu ===
- Mahou Sentai Magiranger (2005) - Vancuria
- Kamen Rider Geats (2022) - Evil Goddess (episodes 31-32)

=== Dubbing roles ===
==== Live-action ====
- Cameron Diaz
  - Feeling Minnesota (Freddie Clayton)
  - Charlie's Angels (2003 TV Asahi edition) (Natalie Cook)
  - Vanilla Sky (Julianna "Julie" Gianni)
  - Charlie's Angels: Full Throttle (2006 TV Asahi edition) (Natalie Cook)
  - Gambit (PJ Puznowski)
  - A Liar's Autobiography: The Untrue Story of Monty Python's Graham Chapman (Sigmund Freud)
- Téa Leoni
  - Deep Impact (Jenny Lerner)
  - Jurassic Park III (Amanda Kirby)
  - Hollywood Ending (Ellie)
  - Spanglish (Deborah Clasky)
- Cynthia Nixon
  - Sex and the City (Miranda Hobbes)
  - Sex and the City: The Movie (Miranda Hobbes)
  - Sex and the City 2 (Miranda Hobbes)
  - And Just Like That... (Miranda Hobbes)
- 21 Grams (Mary Rivers (Charlotte Gainsbourg))
- 24 (Nina Myers (Sarah Clarke))
- About Schmidt (Jeannie Schmidt (Hope Davis))
- Apollo 13 (2003 Fuji TV edition) (Mary (Tracy Reiner))
- Ballistic: Ecks vs. Sever (Rayne Ecks / Vinn Gant (Talisa Soto))
- Bill & Ted's Bogus Journey (1994 TV Tokyo edition) (Elizabeth (Annette Azcuy))
- Billy Madison (Veronica Vaughn (Bridgette Wilson))
- Blade II (Nyssa Damaskinos (Leonor Varela))
- Casper: A Spirited Beginning (Sheila Fistergraff (Lori Loughlin))
- The Cat in the Hat (Joan Walden (Kelly Preston))
- Charlie and the Chocolate Factory (2008 NTV edition) (Mrs. Bucket (Helena Bonham Carter))
- CSI: NY (Jo Danville (Sela Ward))
- Cube Zero (Cassandra Rains (Stephanie Moore))
- Demon Knight (Cordelia (Brenda Bakke))
- Desperate Housewives (Bree Van de Kamp (Marcia Cross))
- Duck, You Sucker! (Adelita (Maria Monti))
- Dumb and Dumber (J.P. Shay (Karen Duffy))
- Dying of the Light (Michelle Zuberain (Irène Jacob))
- ER (Maggie Doyle (Jorja Fox))
- Fantastic Four (2008 NTV edition) (Alicia Masters (Kerry Washington))
- Fever Pitch (Robin (KaDee Strickland))
- Frank Herbert's Dune (Lady Jessica (Saskia Reeves))
- Frank Herbert's Children of Dune (Lady Jessica (Alice Krige))
- Gentleman Jack (Anne Lister (Suranne Jones))
- The Godfather (2001 DVD edition) (Connie Corleone (Talia Shire))
- The Godfather Part II (2001 DVD edition) (Connie Corleone (Talia Shire))
- Heat (Charlene Shiherlis (Ashley Judd))
- Hulk (Betty Ross (Jennifer Connelly))
- Independence Day (Jasmine Dubrow (Vivica A. Fox))
- Independence Day: Resurgence (Jasmine Dubrow (Vivica A. Fox))
- The Interpreter (Silvia Broome (Nicole Kidman))
- Jumanji (2000 TV Asahi edition) (Nora Shepherd)
- The Man (Lt. Rita Carbone (Susie Essman))
- Midnight in Paris (Adriana (Marion Cotillard))
- Mission: Impossible (2003 TV Asahi edition) (Claire Phelps (Emmanuelle Béart))
- Monkeybone (Dr. Julie McElroy (Bridget Fonda))
- Mr. Wonderful (Leonora DeMarco (Annabella Sciorra))
- My Lovely Sam Soon (Kim Yi-young (Lee Ah-hyun))
- New Fist of Fury (Ah Lung's Mother)
- The Pacifier (Julie Plummer (Faith Ford))
- Parental Guidance (Alice Decker-Simmons (Marisa Tomei))
- Proof of Life (Alice Bowman (Meg Ryan))
- Red Dwarf (Kristine Kochanski (Clare Grogan)
- The Rock (2000 TV Asahi edition) (Carla Pestalozzi (Vanessa Marcil))
- Silent Hill (Rose Da Silva (Radha Mitchell))
- Sin (Bella (Alicia Coppola))
- Sky Captain and the World of Tomorrow (Polly Perkins (Gwyneth Paltrow))
- Someone like You (Liz (Marisa Tomei))
- Spy (Rayna Boyanov (Rose Byrne))
- Starship Troopers (Dizzy Flores (Dina Meyer))
- Table 19 (Bina Kepp (Lisa Kudrow))
- Ticker (Claire Manning (Jaime Pressly))
- The Truman Show (Sylvia / Lauren Garland (Natascha McElhone))
- Twin Peaks: Fire Walk with Me (Shelly Johnson (Mädchen Amick))
- Vertical Limit (Monique Aubertine (Izabella Scorupco))
- Vigil (Amy Silva (Suranne Jones))
- What Lies Beneath (Mary Feur (Miranda Otto))
- Zoey's Extraordinary Playlist (Joan (Lauren Graham))

==== Animation ====
- Aladdin (Sadira)
- Batman: The Animated Series (Veronica Vreeland)
- Batman & Mr. Freeze: SubZero (Veronica Vreeland)
- The Incredibles (Mirage)
- Monsters, Inc. (Flint)
