= Metal Gear Solid Delta: Snake Eater =

2025 video game

- Developer: Konami Digital Entertainment (Note: Original game developed by Kojima Productions; additional development by Virtuos and PlatinumGames)
- Publisher: Konami
- Directors: Yota Tsutsumizaki; Yuji Korekado; Yu Sahara
- Producers: Noriaki Okamura; Yuji Korekado
- Programmer: Ryuichiro Okamoto
- Artist: Satoshi Takemura
- Composer: Naoki Nakashima
- Series: Metal Gear
- Engine: Unreal Engine 5
- Platforms: PlayStation 5; Windows; Xbox Series X/S
- Release: August 28, 2025
- Genres: Action-adventure, stealth
- Mode: Single-player

Metal Gear Solid Delta: Snake Eater (Note: Japanese: メタルギア ソリッド デルタ：スネークイーター, Hepburn: Metaru Gia Soriddo Deruta: Sunēku Ītā) (Note: Stylized as Metal Gear Solid Δ: Snake Eater.) is a 2025 action-adventure stealth game developed and published by Konami. It is a remake of the 2004 game Metal Gear Solid 3: Snake Eater, the fifth main entry in the Metal Gear franchise and the first chronologically. Set in 1964, it follows a FOX operative codenamed Naked Snake, who must rescue a prominent Soviet rocket scientist and sabotage the Soviet nuclear superweapon Shagohod, while clearing the United States from Soviet suspicion amid Cold War tensions by confronting his former mentor, the Boss, who has defected to the Soviets.

Metal Gear Solid Delta: Snake Eater is the first major entry in the Metal Gear franchise since the release of Metal Gear Survive in 2018, when Konami stopped publishing AAA third-party console games in favor of budget and mobile games. Their internal studio, Konami Digital Entertainment, developed the game, with Metal Gear Survive and Metal Gear Solid: Portable Ops (2006) producer Noriaki Okamura and Metal Gear Solid V: The Phantom Pain (2015) creative producer Yuji Korekado supervising the project, and with Singaporean studio Virtuos contributing additional development. The game was announced in May 2023. Snake Eater was chosen to be remade over other entries due to its status as an origin story for the franchise and its pivotal characters. The game's title emerged from the development team's desires to faithfully reproduce Snake Eater's gameplay and story with modern graphics and enhancements, but without significant deviations to its original structure.

Metal Gear Solid Delta: Snake Eater was released for PlayStation 5, Windows, and Xbox Series X/S on August 28, 2025, to generally positive reviews from critics, who praised the graphics and gameplay changes, though many were divided on its extreme faithfulness to the original. The game was commercially successful, selling over two million units by March 2026.

== Gameplay ==
Metal Gear Solid Delta: Snake Eater retains the core gameplay mechanics first implemented in Metal Gear Solid 3 and refined from the foundation of previous Metal Gear games, involving Snake having to be controlled by the player as he traverses a variety of environments both in wilderness and industrial settings while evading hostile enemies, traps and other methods of surveillance that can expose his cover over the course of the game's overarching infiltration mission, all while procuring an assortment of melee weapons, firearms and gadgetry that aid him while sneaking and confronting threats. Gameplay additions from prior iterations of the game include abilities such as crouch-walking and using firearms in third-person, first featured in Metal Gear Solid 4: Guns of the Patriots (2008) and Metal Gear Solid: Peace Walker (2010) before being incorporated into Metal Gear Solid: Snake Eater 3D (2012).

The remake introduces a variety of adjustments both with regards to visuals and existing systems that complement modern gaming sensibilities and quality-of-life improvements from subsequent games in the series. Any physical damage such as cuts and bruises inflicted on Snake are now reflected permanently in real time across his body throughout the game's duration, with the intent of illustrating each player's individual playthrough and journey with the character. Object permanence will also apply to the revamped camouflage system, where leaves falling from trees can stick onto Naked Snake's gear, crawling across mud and dirt patches will leave stains on his clothing, and said clothing will have tears and bullet holes after the player takes damage. The Survival Viewer mechanic has also been updated to reflect this feature, with scars persisting on Snake's body even after treating wounds by applying bandages or certain ointments.

Delta also offers two distinct styles of gameplay and presentation. The "New Style" enables a control scheme based on contemporary action games and the more recent Metal Gear entries, while also incorporating a third-person, free-moving camera similar to Metal Gear Solid 3: Subsistence and HD Edition. "Legacy Style", meanwhile, reproduces the classic controls and gameplay systems, as well as an overhead view with a fixed camera much like the original Snake Eater.

"Snake vs. Monkey", a minigame from the original that serves as a crossover with Sony Interactive Entertainment's Ape Escape series, makes a return in the PlayStation 5 and Steam versions, though it is replaced by an equivalent minigame named "Snake vs. Bomberman", a crossover with Konami's own Bomberman series, for the Xbox Series X/S and Microsoft Store versions. The "Secret Theater" from Subsistence also returns, featuring most (Note: Two of the videos in the original Secret Theater ("I Read Them For the Articles" and "MGS4 Trailer TGS 2005") were omitted from this release.) of the original bonus videos, as well as new ones which can be unlocked.

== Development and release ==
After the release of Metal Gear Solid V: The Phantom Pain in September 2015, Metal Gear series creator Hideo Kojima publicly split with Konami. In October 2015, Konami's head of gaming Hideki Hayakawa said that the company would pull out of developing and publishing major third-party games for consoles and PC, and that they would instead focus on mobile gaming and arcades. Despite this, Konami released the spin-off game Metal Gear Survive in 2018 without Kojima, which received mixed reviews and was a commercial failure. In October 2021, Video Games Chronicle writer Andy Robinson reported that Konami was returning to the mainstream video game industry and beginning production on multiple new projects in older Konami console game franchises that had been dormant, including Metal Gear as well as Castlevania and Silent Hill.

Metal Gear Solid Delta: Snake Eater was announced for PlayStation 5 on May 24, 2023, at PlayStation Showcase 2023, alongside the Metal Gear Solid: Master Collection Vol. 1 compilation, which includes the original version of Snake Eater. Following the presentation, the game was confirmed for Windows and Xbox Series X/S. An in-engine gameplay trailer was presented on October 25, 2023, during Microsoft's Xbox Partner Preview digital presentation. A PlayStation promotional video published online at the start of the year initially suggested the game was targeting a 2024 launch window. A full trailer was previewed during Microsoft's Xbox Games Showcase on June 9, 2024, that also featured brief looks at supporting characters such as Major Zero, Para-Medic, Ocelot and the Boss. The following day, Konami released a video installment of their Metal Gear Solid Legacy web series featuring Snake voice actor David Hayter and Metal Gear producer Noriaki Okamura that divulged further details on the remake's gameplay and graphical enhancements. Okamura additionally discussed Delta: Snake Eater during a roundtable on the Official Xbox Podcast on June 11. The game's release date trailer debuted during the February 2025 installment of PlayStation's State of Play event, alongside the reveal of platform exclusive crossover content, with the PlayStation 5 and Windows releases featuring a remake of the "Snake vs. Monkey" crossover minigame with Sony Interactive Entertainment's Ape Escape franchise that released with the original Snake Eater, while the Xbox Series X/S version receives their own iteration, "Snake vs. Bomberman", collaborating with Konami's Bomberman franchise. The online multiplayer mode, called Fox Hunt, was not available at launch, and instead released on October 30, 2025.

Gaming industry expert Christopher Dring told the BBC that remakes of older games such as Snake Eater were due to changing demographics among gamers, saying "[t]he industry is getting older, gamers are entering middle age and are nostalgic for classic titles." In the years prior to Delta's release, remakes of older games such as Final Fantasy VII, Demon's Souls (both 2020) and Resident Evil 4 (2023), had resulted in strong sales.

The remake was a co-production between the Konami's internal developer Konami Digital Entertainment (KDE), who developed several previous Metal Gear games, and Virtuos as a support studio. Konami's choice to remake Snake Eater over other Metal Gear games was due to its nature as an origin story for the franchise and specifically for Big Boss. Konami confirmed that neither Kojima nor original artist Yoji Shinkawa were involved in the remake, but that the development team wanted to produce a faithful adaptation and would not add anything new to the story.

According to the Metal Gear Twitter account, the delta symbol in the game's title "fits the concept of the remake project. Delta means 'change' or 'difference' without changing structure", referring to the symbol's use in math and science to mean a change in quantity. Following the reveal, fans jokingly started to call the game "Metal Gear Solid Triangle". The remake reused the voice actors' audio from the original Snake Eater. The game was built on Unreal Engine 5, making it the first Metal Gear game since Kojima Productions' dissolution not to use the publisher's proprietary Fox Engine technology that was last used for Metal Gear Survive. On August 22, Konami announced via the Metal Gear Twitter account that PlatinumGames, developer of Metal Gear Rising: Revengeance (2013), developed the remade "Guy Savage" mode of Delta.

Metal Gear Solid Delta: Snake Eater was released for PlayStation 5, Windows and Xbox Series X/S on August 28, 2025. Alongside the standard edition of the game, a Deluxe Edition and Collector's Edition for both consoles are set to be distributed. Both editions will come with a special SteelBook case with the original Japanese key art for Snake Eater featuring Naked Snake and the Boss drawn by Yoji Shinkawa, as well as a custom FOX patch and vouchers for additional downloadable content (DLC). The Deluxe Edition also comes with a custom metal and enamel keychain and a clamshell case with special art cards. The Collector's Edition is bundled with a second patch referencing Snake's HALO jump in the game's opening sequence, a replica key card based on the ones used to access new areas in the game, and a "Terrarium Diorama" of the tree in the Dremuchij region with Snake's backpack. A separate Collector's Edition is set for release in EMEA regions.

== Reception ==
=== Critical reception ===
Reception

Aggregate scores
Aggregator	Score
Metacritic	(PC) 83/100 (PS5) 85/100 (XSXS) 83/100
OpenCritic	89% recommended (Note: Based on 153 critic reviews)

Review scores
Publication	Score
Digital Trends	4/5
Eurogamer	5/5
Game Informer	9/10
GameSpot	9/10
GamesRadar+	4/5
Hardcore Gamer	4.5/5
IGN	8/10
NME	4/5
PC Gamer (US)	87/100
PCGamesN	9/10
Push Square	9/10
Shacknews	9/10
The Guardian	4/5
Video Games Chronicle	4/5
VG247	4/5
VideoGamer.com	8/10

Metal Gear Solid Delta: Snake Eater received "generally favorable" reviews from critics, according to review aggregator website Metacritic.

Writing in Rolling Stone, Christopher Cruz mostly praised the game, but criticized it for adhering too closely to the original, finding that unlike the 2024 remake of the 2001 game Silent Hill 2, "Delta doesn't fundamentally change the game or make it feel new. In fact, it feels especially old in ways both good and bad...", stating that players' familiarity with the original would determine how much they would enjoy the remake. Cruz concluded his review by writing that "[f]or now, we're left to dine on reheated leftovers."

=== Sales ===
In Japan, 63,585 physical units of the PlayStation 5 version of Metal Gear Solid Delta: Snake Eater were sold within its first week of release, making it the best-selling retail game of the week in the country. Konami announced that global physical shipments and digital sales surpassed one million units within the first 24 hours of the game's release. By March 2026, Metal Gear Solid Delta: Snake Eater had sold over two million copies worldwide.

=== Awards ===
At the Golden Joystick Awards 2025, the game was nominated for Best Remake/Remaster.
