= James C. Mathis III =

American actor

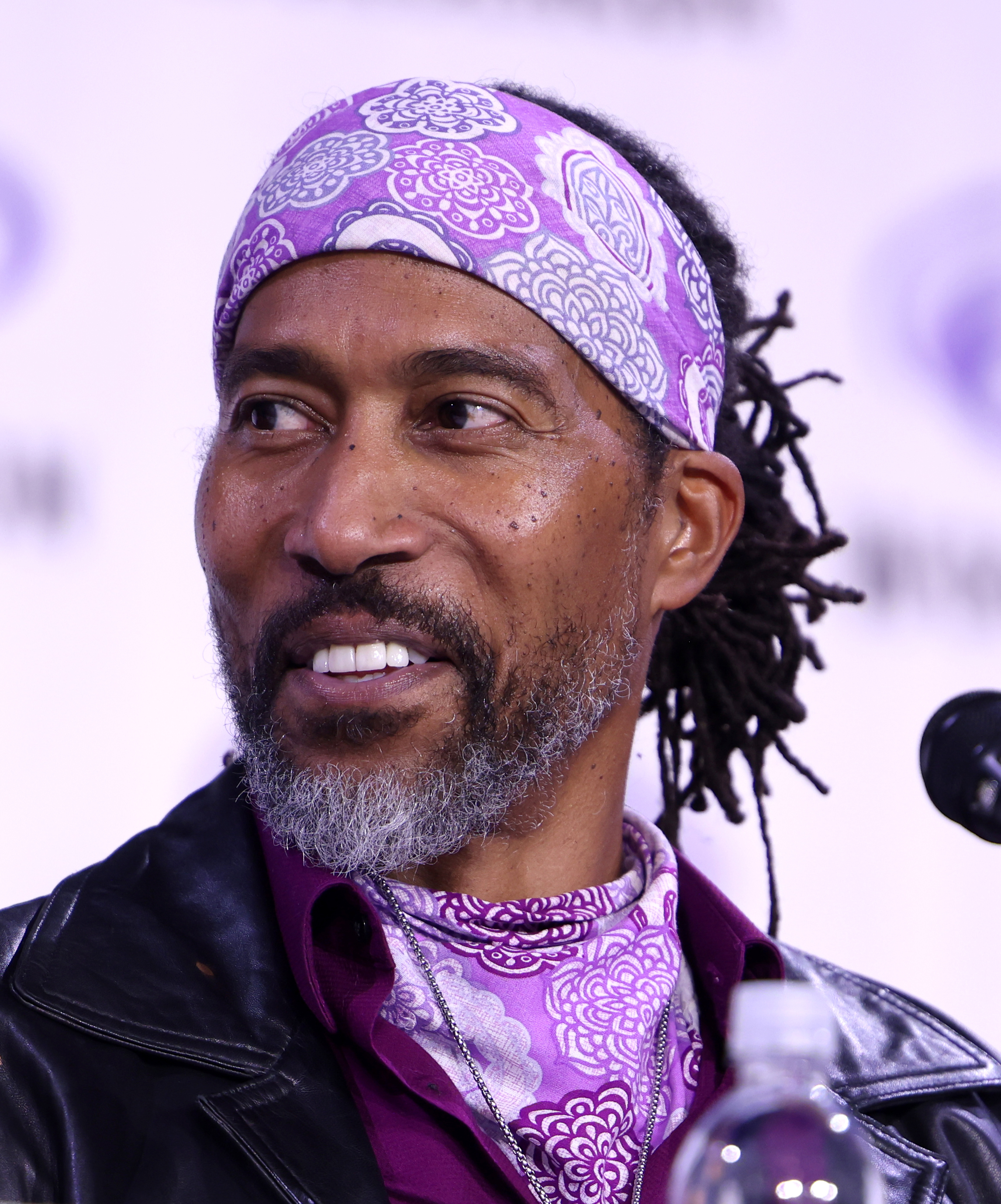
- Mathis in 2026
- Other names: James Mathis III; James Mathis
- Occupation: Actor
- Years active: 1989–present
- Notable work: Metal Gear Solid 3: Snake Eater as Sigint; The Avengers: Earth's Mightiest Heroes and Avengers Assemble as Black Panther

James C. Mathis III is an American actor best known for voicing the Marvel Comics character Black Panther in various media.

== Career ==
After nine years since Mathis starred in his first feature film Breakin' the Rules Mathis went on to make many guest appearances in television shows like ER, Guys Like Us, Pacific Blue and City of Angels.

His first main role was the character Bruce in the VH1 show I Hate My 30's.

Mathis started voice over providing the English voice of Sigint in the English version of the video game Metal Gear Solid 3: Snake Eater. He voiced Black Panther in The Avengers: Earth's Mightiest Heroes (2010–2012) and reprised the role in Avengers Assemble (2013–2019) and numerous video games.

== Filmography ==
=== Film ===
Year	Title	Role	Notes
1989	Breakin' the Rules	Extra	
2002	Undercover Brother	GFC Announcer (voice)	
2005	The Golden Blaze	Additional Voices	Direct-to-DVD
2005	J.A.P.S	Dante	Short film
2005	We Are the World: Inside the World	Stevie Wonder	Short film
2006	Paved with Good Intentions	Winston	
2013	Mega Spider	Street Cop	
2013	Iron Man: Rise of Technovore	War Machine (voice)	English dub Direct-to-DVD
2020	Poupelle of Chimney Town	Danny (voice)	English dub
2023	Lego Marvel Avengers: Code Red	Black Panther (voice)	Disney+ special
2024	Lego Marvel Avengers: Mission Demolition	Black Panther, Candy Suit Vendor (voice)	Disney+ special
2025	Lego Marvel Avengers: Strange Tails	Black Panther, Thanos (voice)	Disney+ special

=== Television ===
Year	Title	Role	Notes
1999	Guys Like Us	Kyle	Episode: "Good Old Days"
1999	Pacific Blue	Dominic Bolivar	Episode: "Gaslight"
2000	City of Angels	Oliver	Episode: "Cry Me a Liver"
2001	ER	Darrel	Episode: "Witch Hunt"
2002	Flatland	D. Walker	1 episode
2002	Any Day Now	Jamal Turner	Episode: "Let the Games Being"
2003	Judging Amy	Gordon Parker	Episode: "Ye Olde Freedom Inn"
2003	The King of Queens	Tony	Episode: "Taste Buds"
2004	Monk	Rastafarian Cook	Episode: "Mr. Monk Goes to Jail"
2005–06	Noah's Arc	Malik	2 episodes
2006	Ben 10	Enforcer Alien (voice)	Episode: "The Big Tick"
2007	Celebrity Deathmatch	Master P (voice)	Episode: "King of the Lil' People"
2007	I Hate My 30's	Bruce	8 episodes
2008	Street Warrior	Zeke Washington	Television film
2009	WordGirl	Tiny Big (voice)	2 episodes
2009–10	Star Wars: The Clone Wars	Captain Typho (voice)	4 episodes
2010	Suitemates	Tom	2 episodes
2010	Gillian in Georgia	Cedric	4 episodes
2010–12	The Avengers: Earth's Mightiest Heroes	Black Panther / T'Challa, Bulldozer, King Cobra, additional voices	24 episodes
2011	The Pacellis	Petrov	5 episodes
2013	Metal Gear Solid: Digital Graphic Novel	Decoy Octopus (voice)	OVA
2013	Metal Gear Solid 2: Digital Graphic Novel	Peter Stillman (voice)	OVA
2013–19	Avengers Assemble	Black Panther / T'Challa, Heimdall, Flint, young T'Chaka, additional voices	45 episodes
2014–15	Hulk and the Agents of S.M.A.S.H.	Terrax, Malekith the Accursed, Ronan the Accuser, Dark Elves (voices)	8 episodes
2015	Ultimate Spider-Man	Terrax (voice)	Episode: "Contest of Champions: Part 3"
2018	Lego Marvel Super Heroes – Black Panther: Trouble in Wakanda	Black Panther (voice)	Television special
2018–20	Baki	Biscuit Oliva, Mohammed Alai (voice)	Netflix ONA
2020	Marvel Future Avengers	Black Panther (voice)	4 episodes
2020	The Casagrandes	Bride's Father (voice)	Episode: "Short Cut"; uncredited
2021	Godzilla Singular Point	Steven (voice)	Netflix dub
2021	Beastars	Ibuki (voice)	Season 2; Netflix dub
2024	Star Wars: Young Jedi Adventures	Gripp Liskell (voice)	2 episodes
2024	Star Trek: Prodigy	Ekthi (voice)	Episode: "The Fast and the Curious"
2024	Terminator Zero	Resistance Commander (voice)	English dub

=== Video games ===
Year	Title	Role	Notes
2004	Metal Gear Solid 3: Snake Eater	Sigint	English version
2004	Ridge Racer DS	Male Announcer	
2005	Shadow of Rome	Zedo, Gedo	
2005	Fantastic Four	Puppet Master	
2005	The Suffering: Ties That Bind	T-Rod	
2005	Ultimate Spider-Man	Additional voices	
2005	SOCOM 3 U.S. Navy SEALs	KILLJOY	
2005	The Matrix: Path of Neo	Police, Security	
2005	Metal Gear Acid 2	Vince	English version
2006	Driver: Parallel Lines	Additional voices	
2006	Dead Rising	Reginald Jenkins	English version
2006	SOCOM U.S. Navy SEALs: Combined Assault	KILLJOY	
2006	Scarface: The World Is Yours	Donut King	
2006	Metal Gear Solid: Portable Ops	Sigint	English version
2006	Ridge Racer 7	Additional voices	
2008	The Rise of the Argonauts	Additional voices	
2008	SOCOM U.S. Navy SEALs: Confrontation	Patrick Lamd	
2008	Spider-Man: Web of Shadows	Rolling Sevens Leader	
2009	Prototype	Additional voices	
2010	Metal Gear Solid: Peace Walker	Soldiers	
2010	Blur	No-1	Unused Cutscene
2011	Infamous 2	Male Pedestrians	
2011	Shadows of the Damned	X, Beast, Demons	
2011	Dead Island	Matutero	
2011	Saints Row: The Third	Pedestrians	
2012	Sleeping Dogs	King	
2013	Grand Theft Auto V	Additional voices	
2013	Marvel Heroes	Black Panther, War Machine, Luke Cage	
2013	Saints Row IV	Additional voices	
2014	The Last of Us: Left Behind	Additional voices	
2014	Disney Infinity: Marvel Super Heroes	Ronan the Accuser, Black Panther	
2015	Disney Infinity 3.0	Ronan the Accuser, Black Panther	
2015	Star Wars: The Old Republic – Knights of the Fallen Empire	Additional voices	Credited as James Mathis III
2016	Mafia III	Additional voices	
2017	Marvel vs. Capcom: Infinite	Black Panther	
2018	Marvel Powers United VR	Black Panther	
2019	Marvel Dimension of Heroes	Black Panther, Ronan the Accuser	Credited as James Mathis III
2019	Marvel Ultimate Alliance 3: The Black Order	Black Panther, Luke Cage, Ronan the Accuser	
2020	Yakuza: Like a Dragon	Additional voices	
2022	God of War Ragnarök	Hildisvíni	
2022	The Callisto Protocol	Duncan Cole	
2023	The Legend of Heroes: Trails Through Daybreak	Ashladd	English dub
2024	Concord	Jabali	
2024	Marvel Rivals	Black Panther	
2025	The Legend of Heroes: Trails Through Daybreak II	Ashladd, citizens, HoloCore	English dub
2025	Marvel Cosmic Invasion	Black Panther, Galactus, Master Mold	
2026	God of War Sons of Sparta	Konstantinos	
