= Metal Gear Solid: Portable Ops =

2006 action-adventure stealth video game

- Developer: Konami Digital Entertainment Co. (Note: Created under their Kojima Productions division.)
- Publisher: Konami
- Director: Masahiro Yamamoto
- Producers: Hideo Kojima; Noriaki Okamura
- Programmers: Masao Tomosawa; Makoto Sonoyama
- Artists: Yoji Shinkawa; Ashley Wood; Kyoko Hariyama
- Writer: Gakuto Mikumo
- Composers: Akihiro Honda; Norihiko Hibino; Takahiro Izutani
- Series: Metal Gear
- Platform: PlayStation Portable
- Release: NA: December 5, 2006; JP: December 21, 2006; AU: May 15, 2007; EU: May 25, 2007
- Genres: Action-adventure, stealth
- Modes: Single-player, multiplayer

Metal Gear Solid: Portable Ops, (Note: Known in Japan as Metaru Gia Soriddo: Pōtaburu Opusu (メタルギアソリッド ポータブルオプス; "Metal Gear Solid: Portable Ops")) officially abbreviated MPO, is a 2006 action-adventure stealth game developed and published by Konami for the PlayStation Portable. The game was directed by Masahiro Yamamoto and written by Gakuto Mikumo, with series creator Hideo Kojima acting as producer.

While not the first Metal Gear game for the PSP, unlike the previously released Metal Gear Acid and its sequel, as well as the Metal Gear Solid: Digital Graphic Novel, it retains the action-based play mechanics from the mainline series. Set in 1970, six years after the events of Metal Gear Solid 3: Snake Eater, the game follows the exploits of Naked Snake after he finds himself captured in Colombia by the now renegade FOX unit.

== Gameplay ==
Gameplay screenshot of Naked Snake capturing a FOX soldier

Portable Ops draws heavily from Metal Gear Solid 3: Snake Eater, utilizing the camera system from the Subsistence edition of the game. The main addition to MPO is the Comrade System. Instead of the solo missions of previous MGS games, MPO goes for a squad-based approach, with Snake having to recruit allies and form a team of trained specialists. Before each mission, the player must compose a four-man squad. The squad is then sent into battle. Each member of Snake's squad has their own strengths and weaknesses. While some units are best utilized on the battlefield, others may specialize in producing items, healing allies, or providing intel for each of the game's maps.

During missions, the player controls only one squad member at a time. Squad members not in use will hide themselves inside a cardboard box, and can be swapped into play when the player-controlled character finds a hiding spot, where he or she will hide in a cardboard box.

A variety of methods can be employed to expand one's squad. If an enemy character is tranquilized or stunned, they can be dragged to a waiting vehicle and captured. After a few in-game days, the captured soldier will become a member of Snake's team. The player can also drag enemy characters to any ally waiting in a cardboard box, where, through the use of a transceiver frequency, or by giving the cardboard box a "nudge", the ally will transport the enemy for the player, saving stamina. Alternatively, by accessing the PSP in certain hotspots using the system's Wi-Fi feature, soldiers and even special bonus characters can be recruited. The PSP GPS Receiver can also be used to similar effect. Since the player's team consists primarily of former enemy soldiers and personnel, generic characters can walk among their own kind undetected as long as the player avoids suspicious actions such as pointing a gun or being spotted by an enemy of another type. Characters that can be recruited by the player include Soviet soldiers, FOX unit members, high-ranking officers, scientists, engineers and government officials. In addition to the standard male characters, the player can recruit and control women scientists and officers as well. The player can also recruit the GRU, KGB and Ocelot unit soldiers from MGS3, but these are only attainable by AP Scan.

Characters who are killed in combat are eliminated from the player's squad permanently. "Unique characters" (i.e. characters important to the game's story, who can only be added into the player's squad by fulfilling certain tasks) are exempt from this rule. If a unique character is wounded in combat, they are sent to an infirmary to recover, making them unusable for a few in-game days. The player can also restart or abort a mission at any moment.

Another new feature is the surround indicator added to the game's HUD. Similar to the radar in previous titles, the surround indicator allows players to determine the relative proximity of enemy soldiers by the noises they make. The surround indicator is composed of two circles; the outer circle displays the noises made by enemies and the inner circle displays noises made by the player's character.

The game contains a Wi-Fi-enabled multiplayer mode, which is an expansion of the "Metal Gear Online" mode previously featured in Metal Gear Solid 3: Subsistence. The player's performance in the Online Mode may affect their performance in the single player campaign; the player can recruit and trade soldiers from beaten opponents, or vice versa. Additionally, certain multiplayer options result in recruits being removed from one's single player roster permanently.

In contrast to the console games in the series, the cutscenes that drive the story are not rendered using the usual real time engine. Instead, they are presented using an animated comic style consisting of hand-drawn artwork by artist Ashley Wood. This style was previously utilized in Metal Gear Solid: Digital Graphic Novel. The game also features voice acting, consisting of returning cast members from Snake Eater and new actors. However, mission briefings and CODEC calls are text only.

== Plot ==
=== Setting ===
Portable Ops takes place in 1970, six years after Metal Gear Solid 3: Snake Eater. It follows the soldier Naked Snake (David Hayter/Akio Ōtsuka) who is forced to fight off his former special forces unit, FOX, after they instigate a revolt in a secret Soviet base in San Hieronymo Peninsula, Colombia, recruiting the abandoned Soviet garrison. In his fight he meets Roy Campbell (David Agranov/Toshio Furukawa), a surviving member of the Green Berets team that was sent to investigate the affair. Snake's former teammates including his commanding officer Major Zero (Jim Piddock/Banjō Ginga), Para-Medic (Heather Halley/Houko Kuwashima) and Sigint (James C. Mathis III/Keiji Fujiwara) return as the support crew as they are suspected for treason alongside Snake.

The main antagonist is Gene (Steven Blum/Norio Wakamoto), the current commander of the FOX unit who seeks to establish his own nation for soldiers. He plans on achieving that goal by threatening both the US and Soviet Union with a Metal Gear that is capable of firing MIRVs carrying nuclear warheads. He is a product of the Successor Project that aimed to artificially create the perfect commander, patterned after The Boss. He is assisted by Lt. Cunningham (Noah Nelson/Daisuke Gōri), an expert in interrogation techniques who is later revealed to be a double agent of the Pentagon sent to tarnish the CIA's reputation. Gene also has a protégé named Elisa (Tara Strong/Saori Goto) who is gifted with extraordinary psychic abilities, implied to be the result of exposure to nuclear fallout during the Kyshtym disaster. Elisa has dissociative identity disorder and has developed an alter called Ursula, whose psychic abilities are stronger than her Elisa alter. Ursula, she works as a member of FOX, while Elisa is a medic who takes care of Null and acts as an informant for Snake. Snake meets Elisa, who initially tells Snake that she and Ursula are twin sisters, only for him to later learn the truth. Two FOX members previously associated with Snake include Null (Larc Spies/Jun Fukuyama), a teenage assassin trained to be the perfect soldier. and Python (Dwight Schultz/Yusaku Yara), a former war buddy of Snake who was previously presumed dead during the Vietnam War.

Other returning characters include Ghost (Brian Cummings/Naoki Tatsuta), an informant who comes into contact with Snake, revealing the existence of ICBMG, the new Metal Gear prototype, Ocelot (Josh Keaton/Takumi Yamazaki), a former Spetsnaz Major who assists Gene from behind-the-scenes, EVA (Vanessa Marshall/Misa Watanabe), a spy for the PLA who assisted Snake in Snake Eater, and Raikov (Charlie Schlatter/Kenyu Horiuchi), a GRU Major. Teliko Friedman (Kari Wahlgren/Yūko Nagashima) and Venus (Kathryn Fiore/Rika Komatsu), the heroines from Metal Gear Acid and Metal Gear Acid 2 respectively, can both be added to the player's squad by either: completing certain side-missions or by starting the second playthrough with save data from their respective games.

=== Story ===
In 1970, six years after the events of Snake Eater, Naked Snake's former team, FOX unit, has broken their allegiance with the CIA and gone rogue. Snake is also targeted by the FOX unit, which has sent renegade FOX unit soldiers to capture him. The game begins with the torture and interrogation of Snake by one of the FOX members, Lieutenant Cunningham. Cunningham is trying to locate the missing half of the Philosophers' Legacy, with the United States Government having already acquired the other half of the Legacy from the Soviet Union at the conclusion of Snake Eater. Snake is imprisoned in a cell next to Roy Campbell, the sole survivor of an American Green Beret team sent in to investigate the base. Snake learns through Roy that they are on the San Hieronymo Peninsula (a Russian transliteration of "San Jerónimo Peninsula") or "La Península de los Muertos", the site of an abandoned Soviet missile silo in Colombia.

The two escape and Snake makes his way to a communications base, where he attempts to contact his old CO, Major Zero. Instead, he is greeted by his old FOX comrades Para-Medic and Sigint, who reveal that Snake and Zero are being charged for treason and that the only way for Snake to be exonerated from the charges is to find and apprehend the leader of the rebellion, Gene. Gene has also persuaded the Soviet garrison stationed at the base to join him, soldiers who were abandoned by their own government and branded as rogue operatives amid the Strategic Arms Limitation Talks with the US. In order to complete his mission, Snake must persuade enemy soldiers to join his ranks due to the scale of his mission.

Snake and his squad defeat the top members of the FOX unit and eventually they make their way into Gene's guesthouse. Snake learns many things on his way. Cunningham was working for the Pentagon and wanted Snake to push Gene into launching a nuke at the Soviet Union to tarnish the CIA's reputation and to prolong the Cold War. Gene was actually aware of this plan from the beginning due to information from Ocelot. Gene really wanted to launch a nuke at America to destroy the Philosophers and to make his nation of soldiers, "Army's Heaven".

Gene kills Elisa, who with her dying breath tells Snake “Your son will bring the world to ruin. Your son will save the world.” Snake destroys an experimental model of the ICBMG, codenamed RAXA, and eventually defeats Gene, destroying the finished ICBMG model afterward. After Gene is defeated he gives Snake the funds, equipment, personnel, and all other information regarding "Army's Heaven". On his return home, Snake is awarded for his actions, he then establishes FOXHOUND afterwards. Elsewhere, Ocelot kills the DCI (Director of Central Intelligence) and takes documents containing the identities of the Philosophers in an effort to "end them".

In the post-credits epilogue, Ocelot speaks with an unknown man on the phone, they are plotting to use the Legacy to fulfill their own agenda. Ocelot actually wanted the trajectory data of the nuke to point to the DCI, in order to blackmail the DCI into giving Ocelot the documents containing the true identities of the Philosophers. Ocelot agrees to join his new employer's project under the condition that Snake/Big Boss participates as well.

== Development ==
The game was conceptualized when the Kojima Productions staff decided to make the first Metal Gear Solid chapter rather than another spin-off for the PlayStation Portable. Hideo Kojima had the idea of the player being able to recruit comrades with the Wi-Fi play. As a result, the game was specifically designed for a portable platform, rather than a home console. Some of the staff had previously worked in the spin-off Metal Gear Acid 2 making Portable Ops their first time doing a main installment. Their biggest challenge was adapting the play mechanics from Metal Gear Solid 3: Subsistence (the latest console installment at the time) to Portable Ops as the PlayStation Portable lacked a right analog. Since players cannot spin the camera with the PlayStation Portable the game added a sound indicator system that helps them to see where there are enemies. Impressed with Ashley Wood's work in Metal Gear Solid: Digital Graphic Novel the studio asked his collaboration to illustrate the events accompanied with voice-overs from the story replacing the typical use of real time graphics previously used for cutscenes.

=== Placement in the series' canon ===
MPO is the first Metal Gear game for a portable platform that was written to be part of the series' main continuity. However, the game was not directed nor written by Hideo Kojima (who at the time was leading the development of Metal Gear Solid 4: Guns of the Patriots on PlayStation 3), but by a separate team led by Masahiro Yamamoto and written by Japanese novelist Gakuto Mikumo. However, the production team still largely consisted of staff from previous and future games. The marketing for MPO attempted to distance the game from prior Metal Gear entries on portable platforms, particularly the 2D action game Metal Gear: Ghost Babel for the Game Boy Color and the turn-based Metal Gear Acid series also on PSP (both which were set in their own alternate continuity), with one promotional video on the official English website (narrated by Ryan Payton, Kojima Productions' international coordinator at the time) referring to MPO as "a true action-based chapter in the Metal Gear Saga." This would carry over with the promotion of the series' 20th Anniversary campaign, in which MPO was packaged alongside the three mainline MGS games at the time as part of a box set released in Japan, and later on with the release of MGS4, in which the Metal Gear Solid 4: Database (a downloadable encyclopedia for the PS3 covering the lore of the Metal Gear series up to that point) include entries for characters, items and events depicted in MPO. Kojima also claimed that MPO was a necessary component to the story of MGS4, to the extent that he refused to finalize the story for MGS4 until after the story for MPO was finalized.

A debate amongst the fan base began to arise after Kojima released Metal Gear Solid: Peace Walker (or MGSPW), a later action-based entry also released on the PSP. Unlike MPO, MGSPW was directed and written by Kojima, much like the numbered console entries of the series. Set four years after the events of MPO, MGSPW would be written as a direct sequel to MGS3 and the events of MPO are only given one brief direct mention by one character. MPO was, however, still included in the backstory of Big Boss and official Konami and Kojima Productions Metal Gear Saga timelines both before and after release. Kojima describes MGSPW as a mainline installment in the series, contrasting it with MPO due to his greater involvement. Some official timelines and retrospectives published by Kojima Productions since then have omitted MPO in its games timelines, with others including it. However, MPO was also still included in the expanded timelines outlining the backstory and history of mainline Metal Gear games and characters. One timeline, on the 25th Anniversary page went as far as to describe MGSPW as the "first mainline game in the Metal Gear Saga released for the PlayStation Portable platform", with the summary of MGSPW on the main page describing Metal Gear ZEKE as the "world's first Metal Gear",. However, this retrospective also included Portable Ops as part of “the story of Big Boss” and includes the events of MPO in its accompanying timeline. Kojima would later clarify his stance on MPO, saying that the main story of MPO is part of the saga. However, rather than talking about which games are canon or not, he prefers to view games with a distinction between the ones he wrote and the ones he did not, putting emphasis on the Metal Gear games that he personally worked on (which carry the "A Hideo Kojima Game" byline) from the games that he only worked on as a producer or didn't have a direct involvement in its development.

Since then, Konami have also stated that the events in MPO "tie in to the series canon" and have included it in the timeline of canonical events in their 2023 Master Book series, provided with Metal Gear Solid: Master Collection, a two-volume compilation which re-released numerous Metal Gear games for modern platforms (although MPO itself was not included in either volume of Master Collection).

== Release ==
The game was first released in North America on December 5, 2006. In Japan, it was released two weeks later, on December 21, in two limited edition packages, with both of them sharing most of its unique bonus material, such as a special camouflage for the PlayStation Portable, as well as a set of three original lapel pins.

In Europe, the game was set to be released in April, yet it was delayed for a month. In the United Kingdom, the game could only be released on May 25, 2007, after it was revealed that the required BBFC rating was missing, forcing retailers to send back their stocks. The added features for the European release included new maps for the single-player campaign and multiplayer mode, characters, missions, player careers, as well as a new "Boss Rush" mode.

On November 1, 2009, the game was released digitally on the PlayStation Store on the PSP in all three regions. In June 2016, a digital version of the game was also made available for the PlayStation Vita and PlayStation TV.

=== Soundtrack ===
The musical score of Portable Ops was composed by Norihiko Hibino, Takahiro Izutani, Yoshitaka Suzuki, Kazuma Jinnouchi, Nobuko Toda and Akihiro Honda. The ending theme ("Calling To The Night") was composed by Akihiro Honda and arranged by Norihiko Hibino and Akihiro Honda, with vocals by Natasha Farrow and lyrics by Nobuko Toda. "Calling to the Night" was later featured in Metal Gear Solid 4: Guns of the Patriots as an iPod track, and Nintendo's Super Smash Bros. Brawl as one of the songs played on the Shadow Moses Island stage. The song was used in Metal Gear Solid: Peace Walker as a playable in-game track via the Walkman tool. The soundtrack was first released in Japan on December 20, 2006.

== Reception ==
Reviews

Aggregate scores
Aggregator	Score
GameRankings	86.95%
Metacritic	87/100

Review scores
Publication	Score
1Up.com	A
Eurogamer	9/10
Game Informer	9/10
GamePro	4/5
GameSpot	9/10
GameSpy	5/5
GameTrailers	8.3
GameZone	9/10
IGN	9/10

Metal Gear Solid: Portable Ops received positive reviews. The game scored an average of 86.95% based on 43 reviews on GameRankings and an 87/100 based on 54 reviews on Metacritic. IGN and GameSpot in particular both awarded the game 9 out of 10. GameTrailers gave the game a 8.3, saying "It simply tries to do too much with too little, and while not a deal-breaker, it definitely makes the experience a lot less fun than it could be."

The game sold 230,321 copies after two weeks on sale in Japan.

== Portable Ops Plus ==

Metal Gear Solid: Portable Ops Plus (officially abbreviated MPO+) is a stand-alone expansion of the original MPO, focused primarily on online play. It was first announced on July 17, 2007 and was released in Japan on September 20, 2007, in North America on November 13, 2007, in Europe on March 28, 2008, and in Australia on April 4, 2008. A digital version was released on the PlayStation Store in 2009.

MPO+ includes new general and unique character types from other MGS titles, as well as new items and weapons, new multiplayer maps, and new game modes. While MPO+ does not require the original MPO, players who have save data from the original game can transfer their squad to the expansion and any unique character that the players recruit in the original MPO since their initial save file was created will be added automatically in MPO+ if detected. The following changes have been made to the game.

- The player can now recruit up to 200 soldiers. Soldiers now have new careers and skill levels. Players can also obtain textbook items that can raise the stats of their recruits.
- The story campaign has been eliminated and a new "Infinity Mission" mode has been added in its place, consisting of four difficulty levels. The initial Easy setting consists of a tutorial explaining the rules and mechanics of this new campaign, while the three subsequent settings (Normal, Hard and Extreme) consists of a series of randomly generated stages set in locations from the original MPO that the player's team must clear in succession. During certain stages, the player is given a special challenge such as reaching the goal without being seen or survive an alert phase for a certain period. After clearing a special challenge, the player is allowed to sort his team and replace any of its members and gear with soldiers or items procured in previous stages. The player is also given a choice to suspend their game and resume from where they left off at a later time. If the player successfully complete every stage in Infinity Mission or uses a Fulton balloon to escape, they will retain every soldier, item and experience points acquired since the mission started (conversely, any item or soldier lost during the mission will be permanently lost as well). However, if the player fails or aborts the mission, the player's squad will be set to the way it was before the mission began (undoing any deaths that occurred as well).
- If the game detects save data from the original MPO, a boss rush mode will be unlocked in which a team chosen by the player must face against all the bosses from the original MPO successively. Clearing the boss rush will add any boss character from the original MPO who hasn't already been added to the player's team, although any team member killed during the process will be removed from the roster as well.
- Old Snake from Metal Gear Solid 4 and Raiden from Metal Gear Solid 2 are now unlockable for completing Infinity Mission mode on Normal and Hard respectively, along with Roy Campbell when completing Extreme. Johnny the Guard from Metal Gear Solid 3 can also be found as a random prisoner in certain stages.
- The player can now have Elisa and Ursula in their army at the same time. In the original MPO, the player was only allowed to have Elisa or Ursula, but not both, since in the game's story the two characters were different personalities of the same person.
- Any unique characters that are killed in action will be eliminated from the team. However, lost unique characters will have a probability of showing up in Infinity Mission as random prisoners, giving the opportunity for the player to recover any of them when the opportunity arrives.
- New soldier types can be recruited such as female Soviet soldiers, the arctic Genome Soldiers from the original Metal Gear Solid and the various enemy soldier types from MGS2. There are also female members of the Ocelot Unit from MGS3, but these can only be recruited through the game's "AP Scout" feature, in which the player recruit soldiers through LAN access points.
- Five new maps have been added to the multiplayer mode, including a recreation of Rex Hangar from the original MGS. The Western Wilderness and Ravine stages, previously exclusive to the European version of the original MPO, are now available in every regional release as well.
