= The Boss (Metal Gear) =

Video game character

- Metal Gear character
- The Boss in Metal Gear Solid Delta: Snake Eater (2025)
- First game: Metal Gear Solid 3: Snake Eater (2004)
- Created by: Hideo Kojima
- Designed by: Yoji Shinkawa
- Voiced by: EN: Lori Alan; JA: Kikuko Inoue
- Motion capture: Eriko Hirata

In-universe information
- Nationality: American

The Boss (ザ・ボス, Za Bosu), also known as the Joy (ザ・ジョイ, Za Joi), is a character from the Metal Gear video game series. She first appeared in Metal Gear Solid 3: Snake Eater (2004).

== Character design ==
The Boss's likeness was modelled on the English actress Charlotte Rampling. In the finished game, she wears a pale-colored combat outfit. The director, Hideo Kojima, originally planned to have her in a blue sneaking suit similar to Solid Snake for the finale, but this idea was cut. During the shooting of the final scene between the Boss and Naked Snake, Eriko Hirata (the Boss's motion capture actress), having read the script beforehand, was so moved by the scene that she broke down into tears. Kojima said in 2012, he would "love" to create a prequel game starring the Boss as the protagonist.

== Appearances ==
The Boss is a legendary American soldier, founder and leader of the Cobra Unit, the biological mother of Ocelot, mentor and mother figure to Naked Snake, and is known as the mother of the U.S. special forces. In June 1944, during World War II, she led the Cobra unit to victory at the Battle of Normandy.

The Boss appears as one of the main antagonists in Metal Gear Solid 3: Snake Eater. She defected to the Soviet Union with Colonel Volgin alongside the Cobra Unit. Throughout the game, Naked Snake repeatedly encounters the Boss to kill her as ordered by his superiors. Following Volgin's death, the Boss reveals she is the daughter of one of the original members of the Philosophers behind the Philosophers' Legacy. After one final fight, Snake fights and kills the Boss who gives him the Philosophers' Legacy hidden by Volgin. The whole mission is later revealed to be a coverup by the United States so that the Boss would steal Volgin's treasure and give it to Snake but then die at his hands to avoid a conflict between America and the Soviet Union.

EVA reveals in Metal Gear Solid: Peace Walker that the Boss infiltrated a sleeper agent into the USSR's OKB-1 from 1959 to 1961 to gather more information about the Sputnik program with a little help from the Philosophers. She was eventually commissioned into Project Mercury to test the Mercury capsule and launched into space at roughly the same time as Yuri Gagarin's flight on April 12, 1961. However, the capsule suffered heavy damage upon reentry. The Boss, dubbed within the program as the "Mercury Lady", survived the crash but was rendered comatose for six months. All evidence of her role in the program was erased, including airbrushing her out of an official picture of the Mercury astronauts, of whom she was the eighth member. The Boss's entire personality is also reconstructed in a special AI system developed by Strangelove for the Peace Walker weapon. The Boss died on September 2, 1964, at Tselinoyarsk, USSR, at the age of 42.

== Critical reception ==
The Boss received acclaim. According to Eurogamer, "The Boss is often touted as being one of the strongest female characters in gaming." The Boss was also ranked as the ninth best female protagonist in gaming by the staff of GamesTM despite her role as an antagonist. In 2014, Entertainment Weekly's Darren Franich listed her as one of 15 "kick-ass women in videogames", stating that her conflict with Snake "makes for one of the best protagonist-antagonist relationships in videogame history", and that the multifacets of her relationship with him gives "their final showdown a positively mythic edge." In 2008, the staff of GameSpy placed her at the top of Metal Gear boss battles. She was also included on IGN's 2008 lists of the Metal Gear series' top ten villains (ranked seventh) as well as its top ten boss battles (ranked ninth). That same year, Destructoid ranked this "beautiful" yet "haunting" battle as sixth on their list of top Metal Gear boss fights. In 2012, 1UP.com editor Bob Mackey wrote about the final fight against her that "the confrontation takes place in what could be the most beautiful video game environment of all time, regardless of the PS2's relatively low horsepower." In 2013, PLAY ranked the Boss as the eighth top character in the series, calling her "one of the most important and influential characters in the Metal Gear timeline." She was also voted as the 24th best overall character of the previous decade by Game Informer's readers in 2010.

In 2011, Complex ranked her as first on the list of "most diabolical video game she-villains". PlayStation Official Magazine included her on the lists of PlayStation's six meanest mothers in 2011, and listed the MGS3's final battle against her among the ten most emotional moments in PlayStation history in 2012. GamesRadar praised the Boss's role as an antagonist, putting her in their 2013 list of 100 best villains in video games, and commenting: "No wonder Snake ended up saluting her grave; she deserved no less." In 2013, Liz Lanier of Game Informer included the Boss among top ten female villains in video games, writing: "The Boss is regarded as one of the greatest female video game characters of all time, in addition to being one of the most menacing enemies. The Boss doesn't have to resort to cheap tricks or feminine wiles to get her way or gain respect: that's why she's the Boss."
