= Metal Gear Solid 3: Snake Eater =

2004 video game

- North American cover art
- Developer: Konami Computer Entertainment Japan (Note: Subsistence version developed by Kojima Productions)
- Publisher: Konami
- Director: Hideo Kojima
- Producer: Hideo Kojima
- Designer: Hideo Kojima
- Programmer: Kazunobu Uehara
- Artist: Yoji Shinkawa
- Writers: Hideo Kojima; Tomokazu Fukushima; Shuyo Murata
- Composers: Harry Gregson-Williams; Norihiko Hibino
- Series: Metal Gear
- Platforms: PlayStation 2; Nintendo 3DS
- Release: November 17, 2004: PlayStation 2; NA: November 17, 2004; JP: December 16, 2004; EU: March 4, 2005; AU: March 17, 2005; Subsistence; PlayStation 2; JP: December 22, 2005; NA: March 14, 2006; EU: October 6, 2006; AU: October 13, 2006; Snake Eater 3D; Nintendo 3DS; NA: February 21, 2012; WW: March 8, 2012
- Genres: Action-adventure, stealth
- Mode: Single-player

Metal Gear Solid 3: Snake Eater (Note: Japanese: メタルギアソリッド3 スネークイーター, Hepburn: Metaru Gia Soriddo Surī Sunēku Ītā) is a 2004 action-adventure stealth game developed and published by Konami for the PlayStation 2. Written, produced and directed by Hideo Kojima, the game is the fifth mainline installment in the Metal Gear series and the first chronologically, serving as a prequel to the entire series. Set in 1964, the story centers on the FOX operative codenamed Naked Snake as he attempts to rescue Russian rocket scientist Nikolai Sokolov, sabotage the experimental superweapon Shagohod, and assassinate his defected former mentor, the Boss. While previous games were set in a primarily urban environment, Metal Gear Solid 3 adopts a 1960s Soviet jungle setting. Multiple new gameplay elements are added to match the setting, most notably camouflage, a new CQC combat system, player stamina that can be replenished by eating scavenged food, and an injury and treatment system.

Initially supposed to be developed for the PlayStation 3, Kojima moved development to the PlayStation 2 due to the long wait for the console. The jungle setting was difficult to develop for the game, requiring a new collision engine and planned features to be cut. Harry Gregson-Williams and Norihiko Hibino returned from Metal Gear Solid 2: Sons of Liberty (2001) to compose the score, with the latter writing the game's opening theme, "Snake Eater". The game was released in late 2004 in North America and Japan, and in early 2005 in Europe and Australia. An expanded edition, titled Metal Gear Solid 3: Subsistence, was released in Japan in late 2005, then in North America, Europe and Australia in 2006; this version notably added a third-person camera to the main game and the online multiplayer component Metal Gear Online.

Metal Gear Solid 3 was met with critical acclaim, with many considering it an improvement over Sons of Liberty. Critics praised the narrative, characters, survival elements, and graphics, but some of the new gameplay mechanics and dated camera system were met with a more mixed reaction; the later Subsistence version would be praised for rectifying these issues. The game was also a commercial success, selling more than four million copies worldwide, and has since been considered one of the greatest video games of all time. A numbered sequel, Metal Gear Solid 4: Guns of the Patriots, was released in 2008, while a narrative sequel, Metal Gear Solid: Peace Walker, was released in 2010. (Note: There is significant debate over the canonicity of Metal Gear Solid: Portable Ops, which is set in between Snake Eater and Peace Walker but was not made with Kojima's involvement: see Metal Gear Solid: Portable Ops#Placement in the series' canon.) A remaster was included in the Metal Gear Solid HD Collection (2011), which was rereleased in the Metal Gear Solid: Master Collection Vol. 1 (2023) compilation. A remake, Metal Gear Solid Delta: Snake Eater, was released in 2025.

== Gameplay ==
The gameplay of Snake Eater is similar to that of previous games in the Metal Gear Solid series. Snake, controlled by the player, must move undetected through a hostile, enemy-filled environment. Although Snake acquires various weapons (ranging from handguns to rocket-propelled grenades), the emphasis is on using stealth to avoid confrontations. Many objects and gadgets can be found along the way to aid in this, including motion detectors to track hostile soldiers, and the Metal Gear series' trademark cardboard box, which Snake can hide under to avoid visual detection.

Despite the fundamental similarities, Snake Eater introduces many new aspects of gameplay not present in previous Metal Gear games, including camouflage, a new hand-to-hand combat system called "close quarters combat" or "CQC", a stamina gauge, and an injury-and-treatment system.

Two-thirds of the game is set outdoors in a Soviet tropical forest, and using the environment to its fullest potential is often the key to success. Of the new features, particular emphasis is placed on camouflage and using the jungle environment itself (for example, climbing trees or hiding in tall grass) to avoid being seen by the enemy. The advanced radar from previous games has been removed in favor of a simple motion detector and sonar system more suitable for the game's setting.

Snake uses camouflage to remain undetected. The "camo index" can be seen in the top, right-hand corner.

A percentage value called the "camouflage index" gauges Snake's exposure, on a scale from negative values (highly visible and attracting attention) up to 100% (completely invisible to the enemy). To minimize visibility, the player must switch between different camouflage uniforms and face paints to blend in with the environment; for example, wearing a bark-patterned uniform while leaning against a tree, or wearing striped face paint while hiding in tall grass. Other devices for camouflage, such as a fake gavial head to decrease chances of being detected in water, or a monkey mask, are also available.

The basic close combat from previous installments has been heavily refined and expanded into the CQC system. When unarmed or using a one-handed weapon, Snake can grab opponents and put them in a chokehold, at which point a variety of actions can be performed, such as choking the enemy unconscious, throwing the guard to the ground, slitting the enemy's throat, or interrogating them at knifepoint to obtain information. The context, the pressure applied to the button, and movement of the analog stick determine the action performed.

While previous games used only a simple life bar, Snake Eater keeps track of injuries over the entire body. For example, a long fall could fracture Snake's leg, lowering his maximum life until the injury either heals by itself over time, or is healed instantly through treatment with a splint and bandage.

Besides the aforementioned features, there is also the need to rely upon native flora and fauna to survive. This is manifested in a stamina gauge which constantly depletes during gameplay. Failure to restore the gauge by eating has detrimental effects on gameplay, such as decreasing Snake's ability to aim his weapon and being heard by the enemy due to Snake's loud stomach grumbles. Food can be stored in the backpack until it is needed. However, some types of food rot over time, and consuming rotten foods may result in Snake developing a stomachache, causing the stamina gauge to deplete faster.

The PlayStation 2 version of Snake Eater include a minigame titled "Snake vs. Monkey", a crossover with Sony Computer Entertainment's Ape Escape series in which Snake has to catch monkeys. In addition to containing tongue-in-cheek humor associated with both series, bonus items usable in the main game can be unlocked by progressing through various stages.

== Synopsis ==
=== Setting ===
Snake Eater takes place in an alternate history of events, set within the Cold War during the 1960s. The game's story acts as a prequel to the entire Metal Gear series, exploring the origins of several events covered by previous games, as well as being the first chronological chapter in an overarching story following Big Boss.

=== Characters ===
The protagonist of Snake Eater, Naked Snake (David Hayter/Akio Ōtsuka), known as Big Boss in subsequent games, is a young former Green Beret assigned to the CIA unit FOX. During his mission, Snake is assisted by fellow FOX members over his radio: Major Zero (Jim Piddock/Banjō Ginga), commander of FOX and a former member of the British Special Air Service (SAS), who provides Snake with mission advice and battle tactics; Para-Medic (Heather Halley/Houko Kuwashima), who provides medical information, as well as advice on flora and fauna; and Sigint (James C. Mathis III/Keiji Fujiwara), who provides weapon and equipment information.

The two primary antagonists of the game are Colonel Volgin (Neil Ross/Kenji Utsumi), an electricity-controlling GRU colonel and member of the extreme Brezhnev faction, who are attempting to overthrow Nikita Khrushchev to seize power for Leonid Brezhnev and Alexei Kosygin, and The Boss (Lori Alan/Kikuko Inoue), former mentor to Naked Snake and co-founder of the FOX unit. The Cobra Unit, a Special Forces unit led by The Boss, is composed of The End (J. Grant Albrecht/Osamu Saka), a venerable expert sniper credited as the "father of modern sniping"; The Fear (Michael Bell/Kazumi Tanaka), who has supernatural flexibility and agility; The Fury (Richard Doyle/Masato Hirano), a disfigured former cosmonaut armed with a flamethrower and a jetpack; The Pain (Gregg Berger/Hisao Egawa), who can control hornets to both defend himself and attack his enemies; and The Sorrow (David Thomas/Yukitoshi Hori), the spirit of a deceased medium.

Other characters include Dr. Sokolov (Brian Cummings/Naoki Tatsuta), a rocket scientist whom Snake must rescue; rival scientist Aleksandr Granin (Jim Ward/Takeshi Aono); EVA (Jodi Benson/Misa Watanabe), Snake's love interest, American defector, and KGB agent sent to assist him, and a young Ocelot (Josh Keaton/Takumi Yamazaki), commander of the elite Ocelot Unit within Volgin's GRU.

=== Plot ===
In 1964, CIA agent Naked Snake is sent to Tselinoyarsk, USSR in an operation known as the "Virtuous Mission." Aided by his superior Major Zero, medical advisor Para-Medic, and his former mentor The Boss, Snake is tasked with rescuing Soviet scientist Dr. Nikolai Sokolov, a prominent weapons developer who defected two years earlier until the Russians forced the United States government to return him in order to end the Cuban Missile Crisis. Zero informs Snake that following his return, the CIA received intel that Sokolov is placed in charge of a secret military project to create the Shagohod; a nuclear-equipped tank with the potential to end the Cold War. Although Snake locates the scientist, the mission falls apart when The Boss appears before him and announces her defection to the USSR. While her special forces unit, the Cobras, recapture Sokolov for their new benefactor, Russian officer Colonel Volgin, the Boss defeats Snake in close combat, injuring him and leaving him for dead. Volgin swiftly captures the Shagohod, which was being tested in the region, and uses a Davy Crockett nuclear shell supplied by The Boss to destroy its research facility and cover up the theft. The injured Snake is recovered via fulton extraction, moments after the nuclear blast.

In the aftermath of the destruction, the Soviet Union accuses the United States of the attack, after detecting their aircraft over Tselinoyarsk. To avoid a nuclear war, Soviet Premier Nikita Khrushchev, who suspects Volgin's involvement, agrees to let U.S. President Lyndon B. Johnson prove the U.S.'s innocence. Snake, finding himself assigned by Zero to assist in this manner, is ordered to complete "Operation Snake Eater," which comprises three objectives: stop Volgin's faction; destroy the Shagohod; and eliminate The Boss. Redeployed into Tselinoyarsk to fulfil these demands, Snake is first sent to meet with NSA agent ADAM, who defected to the Soviet Union to infiltrate Volgin's ranks with fellow agent EVA; Snake is instead met and assisted by EVA, who directs him to a lab where Sokolov was taken. Snake survives encounters with Ocelot and eliminates The Pain, one of the Cobras. He reaches the lab and meets Soviet scientist Granin, whose conceptualization of a bipedal tank has been shunned in favour of the Shagohod. Dejected, Granin reveals that Sokolov and the Shagohod are located in Volgin's military fortress Groznyj Grad. Snake eliminates the remaining Cobra members: The Fear, The End, and The Fury. At Groznyj Grad, Snake finds Sokolov but is captured. Having killed Granin, a suspicious Volgin beats Sokolov to death and tortures Snake, who loses an eye while protecting a disguised EVA from Ocelot after suspecting her of being a spy. Snake is imprisoned but escapes.

Snake returns to Groznyj Grad to destroy the Shagohod, but is confronted by Volgin, The Boss, and Ocelot, having uncovered EVA as the spy. Volgin informs Snake of the Philosophers, a secret organization of the most powerful figures in the United States, the Soviet Union, and China, who formed a pact to win World War II and create a new world order. The group jointly amassed $100 billion, the Philosopher's Legacy, to finance their research and operations. However, after the war, the organization began to infight and disintegrated, with the Legacy divided and hidden in banks across the world. Volgin had illegally inherited this money, and Snake learns the U.S. is attempting to retrieve it. Snake defeats Volgin and destroys the hangar, but Volgin pursues in the Shagohod. Snake disables the Shagohod and Volgin is seemingly killed by a bolt of lightning. Snake and EVA flee to a lake, where a WIG is hidden. Before they escape, Snake confronts The Boss and defeats her in battle. The Boss gives him a microfilm of the Legacy before Snake reluctantly kills her.

Snake and EVA escape to Alaska and spend the night together. EVA disappears before morning with the microfilm and leaves a tape revealing herself to be a Chinese spy sent to steal the Legacy for China. She also reveals that The Boss' defection was actually a facade, as she was ordered to infiltrate Volgin's ranks and find the Legacy to bring back to America. However, because of Volgin's nuclear attack, The Boss had to be seen as a traitor and die at the hands of Snake to prove the U.S.'s innocence.

A demoralized Snake is awarded the title of Big Boss and given the Distinguished Service Cross by President Johnson. In Arlington National Cemetery, Snake adorns The Boss' unmarked gravestone and tearfully salutes her.

Ocelot telephones the KGB Chief Director to suggest that the KGB use the knowledge of the Virtuous and Operation Snake Eater missions to blackmail the United States during future negotiations. Ocelot then informs the director of the CIA that the microfilm stolen by EVA was a fake and that half of the Philosopher's Legacy is now in America's hands, with the other half held by the KGB, revealing himself as ADAM.

=== Themes ===
The overarching theme of Metal Gear Solid 3 is "Scene", which has to do with how politics changes with time and location. The narrative technique hyperreality is used, which involves blending fiction and history. The game does this by intermingling historical events and people, like the Cuban Missile Crisis, President Lyndon B. Johnson, and Nikita Khrushchev, with its own fictional elements.

== Development ==
Initially, the game was supposed to be developed for the then-upcoming PlayStation 3, but due to the long wait for the console, the development was moved back for the PlayStation 2 instead. From the outset, the game's director Hideo Kojima wished to drastically change the setting from previous games. He stated that the jungle setting is what both his development team, and the Metal Gear fans, wanted. However, he acknowledged that the elements of a jungle environment, such as the weather, landscape, and wildlife, were features that would present problems during the game's development. Whereas in previous installments the player started close to, or even within, the enemy base, Kojima wished for Snake Eater to be more realistic, with Snake starting miles from civilization and having to work his way to the enemy encampment.

Kojima asked Yoji Shinkawa to make Naked Snake similar to Solid Snake. However, unlike Solid Snake, Naked Snake was a rookie and thus acted more naïvely. Shinkawa stated he had no difficulties in designing Naked Snake as essentially a revised version of Solid Snake. As a result, Naked Snake is virtually identical to Solid Snake from the previous Metal Gear Solid games in terms of appearance. The love scene between Naked Snake and EVA was inspired by the film The Pink Panther (1963). Kojima and Shinkawa watched the movie but the former stated it might have come out differently from the original version. Since the game's trailers did not state that Naked Snake was Big Boss, Kojima often gave vague answers regarding the character's true identity. Originally, Naked Snake was planned to have been voiced by Kurt Russell by Kojima's request, but the actor declined. Russell corroborated further in January 2024 saying that while he understood that Naked Snake was inspired by Snake Plissken, a character he portrayed in the 1981 film Escape from New York, he was not interested in reprising roles nor working on a project that did not involve movie director John Carpenter.

Kojima commented that the outside environment was challenging to create. He explained that the reason previous games were primarily set indoors is that the current consoles were not powerful enough to portray a true jungle environment. In contrast with urban environments, the jungle does not have a flat surface. The protagonist in Snake Eater has to cross uneven terrain, including rocks, dirt mounds, and tree stumps. As a result, the collision engine used in previous installments could not be used, and a new one had to be built from scratch. Setting up the motion capture technology so players could walk over these mounds was a problem during development. Many fans wanted Snake Eater to use a 3D camera, but this was ultimately not implemented in the game. Kojima views Metal Gear Solid, Sons of Liberty and Snake Eater as a trilogy, and wished to keep the camera the same as the previous two, to keep the feel of the three games the same, despite the shifting trend towards full 3D camera movement.

Kojima designed the boss battles of Snake Eater to be totally different from those in previous Metal Gear games, or any other games. He said that the boss battle with sniper The End best represented free, open gameplay in the game. The battle takes place over a large area of dense jungle, and the player must search extensively for The End, who attacks over a long-range from an unknown position. This battle of attrition can last for hours and contrasts with other boss fights in which the enemy is right in front of the player and in view the whole time. In addition, the player can avoid this boss battle altogether by killing The End earlier in the game, or saving and quitting during the fight, waiting a week (or simply advancing the internal console clock), and reloading the game to find The End has died of old age. Kojima commented that features like this do not appear in other games.

=== Music ===
TAPPY
"Metal Gear Solid Main Theme (Metal Gear Solid 3 version)"
30-second sample from the main theme of Metal Gear Solid 3: Snake Eater, composed by TAPPY, arranged by Harry Gregson-Williams.

The musical score of Snake Eater was composed by Harry Gregson-Williams and Norihiko Hibino, who provided material for both cutscenes and the game itself. Hibino wrote the game's opening theme, "Snake Eater", a distinctly Bond-like vocal track which also appears in the game proper, as performed by Cynthia Harrell. Composer and lyricist Rika Muranaka provided a song called "Don't Be Afraid" which is played during the ending of the game. The song is performed by Elisa Fiorillo.

In a break from tradition, one of the ending themes of the game was not an in-house production, but Starsailor's "Way To Fall". Hideo Kojima later revealed in his blog that he originally wanted to use "Space Oddity" and "Ashes to Ashes" (by David Bowie) for the ending themes because of the space development theme of the game, but during the game's development that theme lost its significance. One of his colleagues then advised him to listen to Stellastarr, but Kojima misheard it as Starsailor. He liked the song "Way To Fall", and chose it as an ending theme.

== Release ==
Snake Eater was first released in North America; the Japanese release was held back for almost a month after that. The Japanese version featured several additional downloadable camouflage patterns that were not available for the North American version, some which were only downloadable through data from Metal Gear Solid 3-related soundtrack CDs. A limited "premium package" edition of Snake Eater was released alongside the standard version in Japan. The premium package comes with a DVD featuring all the promotional trailers shown before the game's release (including a proof of concept video shown internally within Konami), two booklets and a painted 1/144-scale model of the Shagohod. A special limited edition CD was given away to those who pre-ordered the Japanese version of Snake Eater, which included several tracks from the game's soundtrack, as well as computer screensavers and additional camouflage for the main game. The pre-order package allowed cell phone users to access a special site featuring image and music downloads.

For the European release, Konami added several new features, including the "European Extreme" difficulty setting, a "demo theater" which allows players to view all cutscenes at any point after viewing them once during the main game, and a Duel Mode, where players can replay boss battles from the main game, in addition to extra facepaints based on European flags and two new "Snake vs. Monkey" levels. Most of the downloadable camo patterns that were available for the Japanese version were also released for the European version, with only a few exceptions.

In July 2007, Konami re-released all the mainline Metal Gear Solid games from the PlayStation and PlayStation 2, along with the PSP game Metal Gear Solid: Portable Ops, individually and as part of a limited edition box set in Japan commemorating the 20th anniversary of the original Metal Gear. This edition of Metal Gear Solid 3 features the first disc from the Subsistence version and a new second disc containing ports of the MSX2 games Metal Gear and Solid Snake, lacking Metal Gear Online (due to the discontinuation of its servers), as well as all the other content that was present in Subsistence's original second disc (Snake vs. Monkey, Duel Mode and Secret Theater). A similar box set was released for the North American market in March 2008, titled Metal Gear Solid: The Essential Collection, which includes the first disc of Metal Gear Solid 3: Subsistence along with the original Metal Gear Solid and Metal Gear Solid 2: Substance, but lacks the second disc with the MSX2 games from the Japanese 20th Anniversary edition.

=== Subsistence ===
Reception

Aggregate score
Aggregator	Score
Metacritic	94/100

Review scores
Publication	Score
Eurogamer	9/10
GamePro	5/5
GameSpot	9/10
GameSpy	5/5
IGN	9.8/10

Award
Publication	Award
IGN	Best Online Game, 2006, PS2

Metal Gear Solid 3: Subsistence (Note: Japanese: メタルギアソリッド3 サブシスタンス, Hepburn: Metaru Gia Soriddo Surī Sabushisutansu) was released in Japan on December 22, 2005, later in North America on March 14, 2006, in Europe on October 6, 2006, and in Australia on October 13, 2006. Subsistence continues the Metal Gear Solid series tradition of follow-up expanded versions. While previous releases, such as Metal Gear Solid: Integral and Metal Gear Solid 2: Substance included skill challenge missions and/or side story missions, Subsistence eschews the extra single-player missions to include ports of the MSX2 version of the original Metal Gear and its sequel Metal Gear 2: Solid Snake (with the latter being officially localized for the first time); Metal Gear Online, an online multiplayer component; and a fully 3D, user-controlled camera in the main portion of the game. Because of all the additional content that was added, the Subsistence edition was split into two discs: the first disc contains the main game only (including the cutscenes viewer), while the second disc features the online multiplayer mode and all the other supplemental content.

The online mode in Subsistence. Here, the GRU team faces off against the KGB team.

Metal Gear Online, consists of five tournament-style game modes, each with a capacity of up to eight players. This mode pits players, each playing as a generic soldier against each other in deathmatch battles and variations of capture the flag, using stages, items, maneuvers, and units (such as the KGB, GRU or Ocelot Unit) from the main game. Depending on server settings, each round the highest-scoring player in each unit automatically assumes the role of one of the main characters (or Reiko Hinomoto from Rumble Roses), along with unique abilities and/or items. For example, the highest-scoring player on the GRU team would assume the role of Major Raikov, leader of the GRU, next round. Konami's Metal Gear Online service for the PlayStation 2 closed in Japan on December 26, 2006, followed by in North America on April 2, 2007, and in Europe on October 30, 2007, although a fan community has revived it by emulating the servers. As noted above, the online mode, after one of the players unlocks an animal codename, also allowed for the player to play as either Reiko Hinomoto or Rowdy Reiko from Rumble Roses (depending on if the player in question was in the red team or the blue team, respectively). According to Metal Gear series creator Hideo Kojima, he added the characters into the game as secret characters in part due to opportunity: Kojima had earlier been offered a deal with Rumble Roses producer Akari Uchida to make a crossover between Metal Gear and Rumble Roses. However, the Metal Gear development team at the time refused to work with them. Kojima eventually accepted the offer when trying to decide on secret characters for the online mode for Subsistence to tie up loose ends. He also admitted that he originally considered offering Tomonobu Itagaki, at the time the producer of the Tecmo fighting game series Dead or Alive, the opportunity of using one of his characters as a secret character.

In addition to the older games and the online mode, Subsistence includes many of the features that were introduced in the Japanese and European releases. It includes the downloadable extra camouflage and facepaint designs and "Snake vs. Monkey" stages previously exclusive to the European release, the European Extreme difficulty level, parody cutscenes and trailers from the official website, and connectivity with Metal Gear Acid 2. The Japanese version also includes a URL for a hidden website that allows the download of OtaClock, a PC and Mac clock program that features Metal Gear Solid series recurring character Otacon. This website is now publicly available.

"Limited Edition" copies of Subsistence also include Existence, the game's cutscenes edited into a three-and-a-half-hour feature film with additional scenes and remastered sound. The North American "Limited Edition" package was only available to consumers who pre-ordered it before the game's release. The three-disc edition is the standard release of Subsistence in Europe to make up for its later release in the region.

A bonus documentary DVD video titled Metal Gear Saga Vol. 1 was bundled with pre-orders for Subsistence in North America and with the European Platinum reissue of Snake Eater released in Germany on March 23, 2006. The disc includes a five-part, 30-minute featurette about the entire Metal Gear series interspersed with an interview of Hideo Kojima, as well as trailers for various current Metal Gear games.

Subsistence received marginally higher review scores than the original Snake Eater, averaging 94% on Metacritic. Reviewers commented that the introduction of the 3D camera removed the "only grade-A problem" and makes the gameplay feel "less restrictive and more natural". The online mode is considered "impressive for a PS2 game", though "[Snake Eater]'s distinctive gameplay conventions do not entirely lend themselves to the online action-gaming experience." Subsistence received IGN's award for "best online game" for the PlayStation 2 in December 2006.

=== HD Edition ===
Metal Gear Solid 3: Snake Eater - HD Edition was released on the PlayStation 3 and Xbox 360 consoles in late 2011. Ported by Bluepoint Games, it was released as part of the Metal Gear Solid HD Collection, as well as a digital download on PlayStation Network and Xbox Live Arcade. The PlayStation 3 and Xbox 360 versions run in a resolution of 720p and aim for a target framerate of 60 frames per second, compared to the PlayStation 2 version's maximum of 30 FPS. The aspect ratio has also been increased from the original's 4:3 presentation to a wider 16:9 resolution, giving players a wider view of their surroundings. The HD Edition features some of the content from the Subsistence version, such as the third-person camera and demo theater, but lacks the online multiplayer mode and the "Snake vs. Monkey" minigame (due to this version also being released on the Xbox 360). The original Metal Gear games are also included in this version, both accessible from the main menu. A PlayStation Vita version of the Metal Gear Solid HD Collection released in June 2012, which features Metal Gear Solid 2 and 3; this version of Metal Gear Solid 3 features limited touch controls to take advantage of the Vita's touchscreen, and compared to the PlayStation 2 version, the framerate is a more consistent 30 FPS, with less screen tearing.

=== Snake Eater 3D ===
Reception

Aggregate score
Aggregator	Score
Metacritic	78/100

Review scores
Publication	Score
Eurogamer	7/10
GameSpot	8/10
IGN	8.5/10

A screenshot of Metal Gear Solid: Snake Eater 3D, showing Snake restraining the enemy with CQC

At Electronic Entertainment Expo 2010, Konami displayed a technical demo for the Nintendo 3DS entitled Metal Gear Solid 3D: Snake Eater – The Naked Sample. The demo's subtitle "The Naked Sample" was meant to convey its purpose as just a sample of the 3DS hardware, with no plans to bring a game into production at that point. Series producer Hideo Kojima stated at the time that if a Metal Gear game for the 3DS was actually made they would consider some elements from the PlayStation Portable title Metal Gear Solid: Peace Walker, including the game's cooperative gameplay system. Later in 2010, Konami announced a full Metal Gear title for release on the 3DS, which was revealed at Nintendo World 2011 to be Metal Gear Solid: Snake Eater 3D. It was released on February 21, 2012, in North America and March 8, 2012, worldwide.

Due to the limited interface of the 3DS, as well as to take advantage of the touchscreen, 3D has unique controls when compared to other games in the Metal Gear series. While the game has been heavily criticized for these control changes, use of the Circle Pad Pro peripheral has been cited for alleviating many of the control issues of the 3DS. This is done by restoring camera movement to the second analog stick, adding ZL and ZR buttons for aiming and attacking, and allowing the face buttons to be used in a manner more in line with all other releases in the Metal Gear series.

3D also has certain optional in-game differences that affect play, such as the concise over the shoulder third-person view and the addition of crouch-walking. Firing in this third-person view substitutes an open cross-hair for the standard down-the-barrel sighting of the standard FPS view. This method of aiming can seem less precise but does allow for a greater margin of error in accuracy. 3D makes use of the 3DS console's gyroscope, which is used to maintain balance when walking across a bridge or standing on tree branches. The camouflage system has also been updated, allowing the player to make use of the 3DS's camera to make a custom camouflage pattern. The port features numerous graphical improvements over the initial PlayStation 2 version including better character models and the addition of normal mapping. Despite this, the frame rate has been criticized for falling far below the other versions of Snake Eater. Snake Eater 3D has met with positive reviews, averaging 78/100 at Metacritic based on 46 reviews.

=== Master Collection ===
An enhanced port of Metal Gear Solid 3: Snake Eater - HD Edition was released onto PlayStation 4, PlayStation 5, Xbox Series X|S, Nintendo Switch and Steam in 2023. While primarily based on the 2011 Bluepoint version, this version drops the HD Edition suffix in its title, and include a Digital Screenplay Book as well as a Digital Master Book. On Nintendo Switch, the game runs in 720p 30 FPS in handheld mode and 1080p 30 FPS in TV mode. On other platforms, the game runs in 1080p 60 FPS.

=== Remake ===
A remake of Metal Gear Solid 3, titled Metal Gear Solid Delta: Snake Eater, was developed by Konami with support from Virtuos. Delta was announced during the May 2023 PlayStation Showcase and was released on August 28, 2025, for PlayStation 5, Windows, and Xbox Series X/S.

== Related media ==
=== Novel ===
A novelization of Metal Gear Solid: Snake Eater, written by Satoshi Hase, was published by Kadokawa Shoten in Japan on January 25, 2014.

=== Pachislot ===
KPE, the parlor entertainment subsidiary of Konami, announced a pachislot adaptation of Metal Gear Solid 3: Snake Eater. It runs on a new type of cabinet known as the "Big Boss", which features a 32-inch LCD monitor in full HD covering its front surface. Scenes from the original video game have been redone in updated CGI to showcase the cabinet's high-end video capabilities. The machine was officially distributed on October 17, 2016, to various parlors nationwide in Japan.

== Reception ==
Snake Eater was a commercial success, selling 2.38 million units in Asia and America by December 2004, and 3.6 million copies worldwide by August 2005. This was considerably lower than Metal Gear Solid 2: Sons of Liberty, which had sold 7 million copies. Snake Eater sales increased to over 3.7 million units by September 2005, and more than four million units sold worldwide as of March 2010. In Japan, Subsistence sold 133,339 copies and Snake Eater 3D sold 79,284 copies.

=== Critical reception ===
Reception

Aggregate score
Aggregator	Score
Metacritic	91/100

Review scores
Publication	Score
Edge	8/10
Eurogamer	8/10
Game Informer	9.5/10
GameSpot	8.7/10
GameSpy	4.5/5
GameTrailers	9/10
IGN	9.6/10

Awards
Publication	Award
IGN	Best Story, Best Use of Sound
GameSpot	Best Story, Best Sound Effects, Best New Character

Metal Gear Solid 3: Snake Eater received "universal acclaim" according to review aggregator website Metacritic. Gaming website IGN awarded a 9.6/10 and Edge rated it 8/10. GameSpot, who granted it an 8.7/10, commented that the game is "richly cinematic" and "a great achievement". GameSpy hailed it as "probably the best Metal Gear Solid game yet", and Eurogamer called it "overwhelmingly superior to MGS2: Sons of Liberty" in their review.

Critics were pleased with the new protagonist, Naked Snake—who strongly resembles the series protagonist Solid Snake—after fans were disappointed by Raiden in MGS2. Some critics, who found the lengthy dialogues and the multitude of plot twists in Sons of Liberty to be detrimental to the game experience found the storyline of Snake Eater a pleasing throwback to the original Metal Gear Solid, with less of the "philosophical babble" present in Sons of Liberty. GameTrailers scored the original game a 9/10, citing the improved graphics, gameplay and story from the previous two games but critiqued the camera and downtime between cutscenes.

Reviewers had mixed opinions about the game's camouflage system. Edge commented that "laying, camouflaged, in short grass inches away from a patrolling enemy is a gripping twist on stealth", while GameSpy criticized it as "just a number to monitor and not a terribly interesting one". Out of the variety of new features, GameSpot called it "the most important and best implemented". The game has also been criticized for its low frame rate, which has been reduced to 30 frames per second (compared to 60 frames per second in Sons of Liberty). Other reviewers criticized the camera, which was labeled "dated" by IGN, and "off-kilter" by Eurogamer.

The cut scenes of Snake Eater have been called "visually exciting and evocative, beautifully shot" by Edge. However, they commented that the script "ranges from awkward to awful" and criticized David Hayter's performance as Snake, concluding that "Snake Eater's speech is not up to the standard of other games, let alone cinema." GameSpot said that some of the humor "falls flat, as if lost in translation from Japanese" and "should appeal to... hardcore fans but... takes you out of the moment."

=== Awards ===
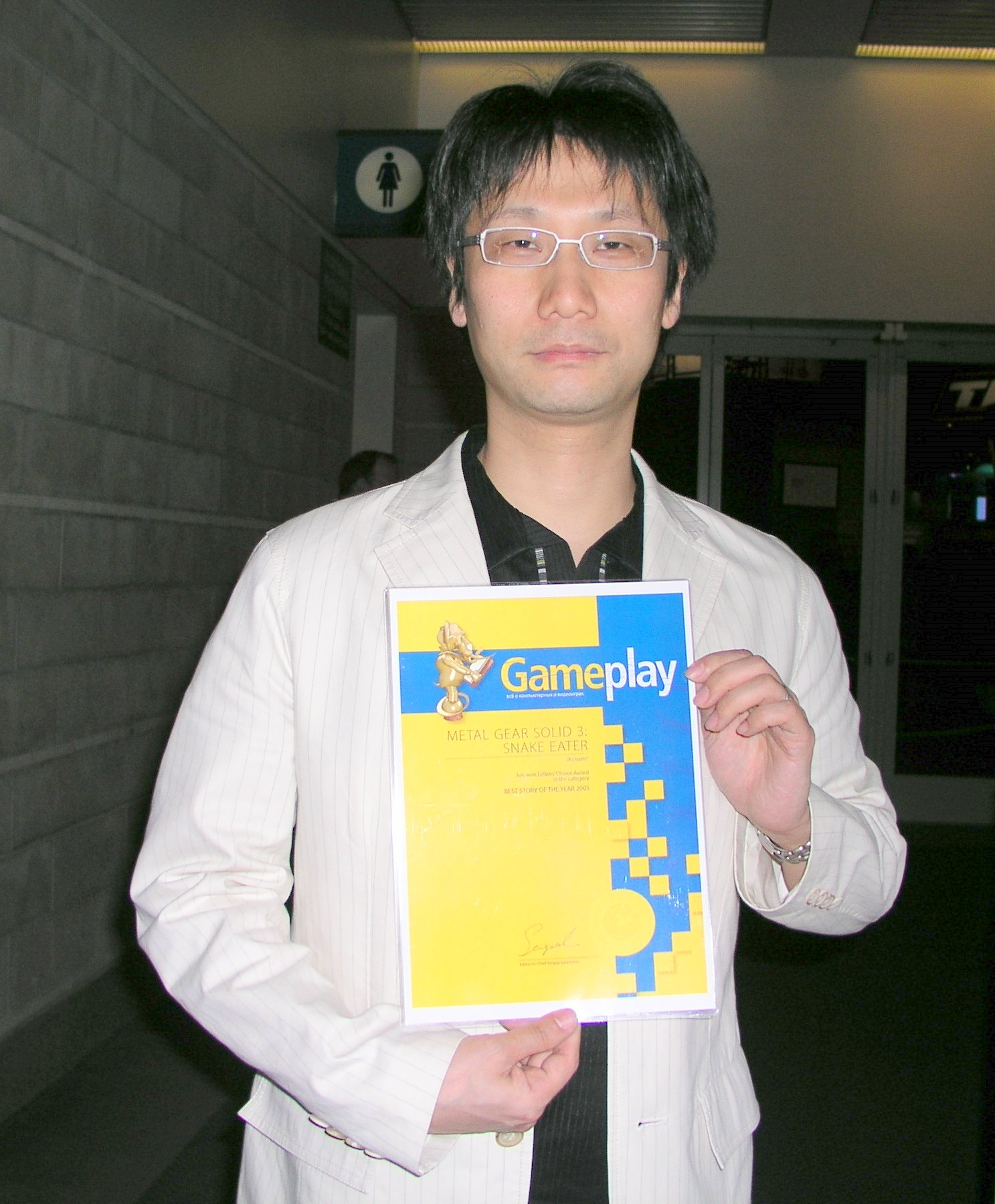
Kojima at E3 2006 holding a Gameplay award for Best Story of the Year, 2005

Since its release in 2004, the game has received numerous awards. Notable ones include Best Overall Action Game, Best Overall Story and Best PS2 Use of Sound at IGN's Best of 2004 awards, and Best Story, Best Sound Effects and Best New Character at GameSpot's Game of the Year 2004 awards. It was a runner-up in GameSpot's Best Action Adventure Game, Best Graphics, Artistic and Best Original Music categories.

At the 9th CESA Game Awards, the game was one of the recipients of the Award for Excellence. Snake Eater's theme song won the Best Original Vocal Song - Pop award from the Game Audio Network Guild Awards at the Game Developers Conference in August 2005, while the game itself won the award for Best PS2 Game at 2005's Game Convention in Germany. At the 8th Annual Interactive Achievement Awards (now known as the D.I.C.E. Awards), Metal Gear Solid 3: Snake Eater was nominated for "Console Action/Adventure Game of the Year" and "Outstanding Achievement in Character Performance - Male" for David Hayter's vocal performance as Naked Snake.

== Legacy ==
Snake Eater was developed as a prequel to the entire Metal Gear series, and was followed by several direct sequels: Metal Gear Solid: Portable Ops, Metal Gear Solid: Peace Walker, Metal Gear Solid V: Ground Zeroes, and Metal Gear Solid V: The Phantom Pain. In 2011, Kojima revealed that he floated the idea of a Metal Gear Solid 5 set during the World War II invasion of Normandy, showing The Boss and Cobra Unit's assistance in the fight. However, the team was hesitant about such a big project and Kojima later felt that "simply dropping MGS5 on the younger staff members was a bit heavy." Although the ending of Metal Gear Solid 3 reveals Naked Snake was given the Big Boss title, Kojima stated "he's not really the Big Boss yet". With Metal Gear Solid: Peace Walker, he wanted to explain how Naked Snake became the man who appeared in the original Metal Gear games as Solid Snake's enemy.

The game has since been listed on several "Best of ..." lists by video-gaming publications. In 2009, IGN placed Subsistence at number 3 on its "The Top 25 PS2 Games of All Time" list. GamePro listed Snake Eater and Subsistence at 8th place on its list of "The 36 Best PS2 Games" in 2010. That same year, IGN ranked Snake Eater 2nd on its list of the "Top 100 PlayStation 2 Games", and said that it had "the best story in the franchise". In 2013, GamesRadar placed the game at number 22 on its "The 100 Best Games of All Time" list. That same year, the game's story was ranked 10th place on GamesRadar's list of "The Best Videogame Stories Ever". In 2015, the game placed 2nd on USgamer's "The 15 Best Games Since 2000" list.

At one point in the game, the player must climb an extremely tall ladder for approximately three minutes while "Snake Eater" plays in the background. This sequence was cited as one of the series' most memorable moments, as well as an example of metafiction that highlights the linearity of video games. It has since become a well-known video game meme, with players calling attention to or creating very long ladders in other games such as Starfield.
