= Metal Gear =

Video game franchise

- Logo of the Metal Gear franchise
- Genres: Action-adventure; Stealth; Third-person shooter; Hack and slash
- Developers: Konami Computer Entertainment Japan (1987–2005); Kojima Productions (2005–2015) (Note: Although Kojima had been working on games at Konami, Kojima Productions was not officially formed until 2005, from the staff of the prior Konami Computer Entertainment Japan division.); Digital Dialect (2000); Silicon Knights (2004); Ideaworks Game Studio (2008); Genki (2010); Bluepoint Games (2011); GREE (2012); PlatinumGames (2013); Nvidia Lightspeed Studios (2016); Konami Digital Entertainment (2018–present); Rocket Studio (2023); M2 (2023); Virtuos
- Publishers: Konami; Microsoft Game Studios (2000)
- Creator: Hideo Kojima
- Platform: Various: Commodore 64; Game Boy Color; GameCube; Microsoft Windows; Mobile; MS-DOS; MSX2; N-Gage; Nintendo 3DS; Nintendo Entertainment System; Nintendo Switch; Nintendo Switch 2; Nvidia Shield TV; OS X; PlayStation; PlayStation 2; PlayStation 3; PlayStation 4; PlayStation 5; PlayStation Portable; PlayStation Vita; Wii Virtual Console; Xbox; Xbox 360; Xbox One; Xbox Series X/S
- First release: Metal Gear; July 13, 1987
- Latest release: Metal Gear Solid: Master Collection Vol. 2 August 27, 2026

Metal Gear (Note: Japanese: メタルギア, Hepburn: Metaru Gia) is a Japanese franchise of action-adventure stealth games created by Hideo Kojima. Developed and published by Konami, the first game, Metal Gear, was released in 1987 for MSX home computers. The player often takes control of a special forces operative, usually Solid Snake, who is typically assigned the task of finding the titular superweapon, "Metal Gear", a bipedal walking tank (mecha) with the ability to launch nuclear weapons.

Several sequels have been released for multiple consoles, which have expanded the original game's plot, adding characters opposing and supporting Snake, while several prequels have explored the origins of Metal Gear and recurring characters. The third game in the series, Metal Gear Solid for the PlayStation, marked a transition to 3D graphics and gained the series international fame.

The series is credited for pioneering and popularizing stealth games, as well as "cinematic video games". Notable traits of the series include cinematic cutscenes, intricate storylines, offbeat and fourth-wall humor, and exploration of cyberpunk, dystopian, political and philosophical themes, as well as references to Hollywood films. Individual installments have been critically acclaimed, as well as receiving several awards. The series has sold 66.4 million units as of the end of June 2026. The franchise has also been adapted into other media, such as comics, novels, and drama CDs. Solid Snake has also gone on to appear in other games, such as the Super Smash Bros. series, Ape Escape 3, LittleBigPlanet, Fortnite, Tom Clancy's Rainbow Six Siege, and Astro Bot.

== Games ==
Release timeline
1987	Metal Gear
1988	Metal Gear (Famicom/NES)
1989
1990	Snake's Revenge
1990	Metal Gear 2: Solid Snake
1991
1992
1993
1994
1995
1996
1997
1998	Metal Gear Solid
1999	Metal Gear Solid: Integral (VR Missions)
2000	Metal Gear: Ghost Babel
2001	Metal Gear Solid 2: Sons of Liberty
2002	Metal Gear Solid 2: Substance
2003
2004	Metal Gear Solid: The Twin Snakes
2004	Metal Gear Solid 3: Snake Eater
2004	Metal Gear Acid
2005	Metal Gear Acid 2
2005	Metal Gear Solid 3: Subsistence
2006	Metal Gear Solid: Portable Ops
2007	Metal Gear Solid: Portable Ops Plus
2008	Metal Gear Solid Mobile
2008	Metal Gear Solid 4: Guns of the Patriots
2008	Metal Gear Online
2009	Metal Gear Solid Touch
2010	Metal Gear Solid: Peace Walker
2011
2012	Metal Gear Solid: Snake Eater 3D
2012	Metal Gear Solid: Social Ops
2013	Metal Gear Rising: Revengeance
2014	Metal Gear Solid V: Ground Zeroes
2015	Metal Gear Solid V: The Phantom Pain
2016
2017
2018	Metal Gear Survive
2019
2020
2021
2022
2023	Metal Gear Solid: Master Collection Vol. 1
2024
2025	Metal Gear Solid Delta: Snake Eater
2026	Metal Gear Solid: Master Collection Vol. 2

Hideo Kojima designed the original Metal Gear, which debuted in Japan and Europe in 1987 for the MSX2 computer platform. A separate team created a heavily modified Nintendo Entertainment System (NES) port of the game that was released in Japan on December 22, 1987, North America in June 1988, and Europe and Australia sometime in 1989. Konami produced an NES sequel, Snake's Revenge, again without Kojima, released in North America and Europe in 1990. One of that game's designers became acquainted with Kojima and asked him to create a "real Metal Gear sequel". In reaction, Kojima began development of Metal Gear 2: Solid Snake, which was released in Japan in 1990 for the MSX2.

Following Metal Gear 2's completion, Kojima worked on other projects before directing his third Metal Gear game, Metal Gear Solid, for the PlayStation. It began development in 1994 and debuted at the 1996 Tokyo Game Show, before being released in 1998. The success of Metal Gear Solid resulted in a series of sequels, prequels, spin-offs, ports, and remakes for a variety of platforms. Metal Gear: Ghost Babel was released for the Game Boy Color in April 2000. Metal Gear Solid was followed up by the sequel Metal Gear Solid 2: Sons of Liberty released in November 2001 for the PlayStation 2. A remake of the original Metal Gear Solid called Metal Gear Solid: The Twin Snakes was released for the Nintendo GameCube in early 2004. Later that year, the third numbered entry, Metal Gear Solid 3: Snake Eater, was released on the PlayStation 2. This is the first prequel which was set prior to all the previously released Metal Gear games and which acted as an origin to the franchise. Several games were released for Sony's PlayStation Portable. In a departure from the series' style, Metal Gear Acid and its sequel used turn-based strategy mechanics based on collectible cards. These games were followed by a sequel to Snake Eater, Metal Gear Solid: Portable Ops, which was released on the PlayStation Portable in 2006. The series' main storyline was concluded in Metal Gear Solid 4: Guns of the Patriots for the PlayStation 3 in 2008. The game featured a multiplayer spin-off called Metal Gear Online.

In April 2010, another sequel to Snake Eater, Metal Gear Solid: Peace Walker, was released for the PlayStation Portable and was set shortly after the events of Portable Ops. The spin-off game, Metal Gear Rising: Revengeance, was released in 2013 on the PlayStation 3 and Xbox 360, and in Jan 2014 on Steam (PC). The game is set after Guns of the Patriots and stars Raiden, the protagonist of Sons of Liberty who turned into a cyborg ninja.

On May 18, 2009, a teaser site for the following installment in the Metal Gear series was uploaded by Kojima Production. The site initially consisted of a series of countdowns leading to several flashing letters and the images of two characters looking like a middle-aged Big Boss and a cyborg Raiden. An article published in the July 2009 issue of Famitsu PSP + PS3 covers the content of the site and features an interview with Hideo Kojima. The interview, revealing many details, is heavily censored and was published that way as a request by Kojima, who was directing and designing the new game. Famitsu was to publish the full interview in its following issue. The new game was eventually revealed to be Metal Gear Rising: Revengeance, which was announced on June 1, 2009, at E3, during the Microsoft Press Conference.

At E3 2010, a demo, "Metal Gear Solid 3D: Snake Eater – The Naked Sample", was shown on the Nintendo 3DS. The official E3 Kojima site later released screenshots and official art for the demo. Kojima did state, however, that this was not a preview for a full game but just a sample of what could be done on the 3DS hardware. Another mobile port of a previously released game was shown at Sony's PlayStation Meeting on January 27, 2011, where Hideo Kojima demonstrated a possible portable version of Metal Gear Solid 4: Guns of the Patriots for the upcoming PlayStation Vita.

In November 2011, Kojima discussed with PlayStation Official Magazine (UK) the series' future commenting an upcoming Metal Gear Solid 5. Kojima said: "I think we'll probably have to make it [a sequel to MGS4] at some point, but what that will be, we have no idea". Kojima stated that when Konami does get around to building the game, he will have less influence than he had on previous iterations in the series. After the mixed fan reactions of the reveal of the rebooted action gameplay focused spin-off Metal Gear Rising: Revengeance, Hideo Kojima reassured fans that an "authentic stealth Metal Gear Solid" sequel would be coming in the future.

During a discussion panel at the Smithsonian American Art Museum in March 2012, Kojima stated: "I am working on something that I think will become the shining moment" for his career and the Metal Gear series. During the franchise's 25th anniversary, Konami revealed a demo for a new game in the Metal Gear series, Metal Gear Solid: Ground Zeroes. A social game for the GREE, Metal Gear Solid: Social Ops, was released in December 2012.

On December 7, 2012, a teaser for The Phantom Pain was revealed on the Spike Video Game Awards. Following the teaser trailer, numerous video game-related websites and fansites reported the trailer's seemed connection to the Metal Gear series of video games.

On March 27, 2013, Kojima announced at GDC 2013 that Metal Gear Solid: Ground Zeroes and The Phantom Pain were two different portions of one work, Metal Gear Solid V: The Phantom Pain, with Metal Gear Solid: Ground Zeroes serving as the prologue and The Phantom Pain serving as the main story. Snake's usual English-language voice actor David Hayter was not cast for the role. Instead, Hollywood actor and producer Kiefer Sutherland portrayed the character through voice acting and facial capture.

In 2015, Konami revealed that they were recruiting new staff members to develop a new Metal Gear game as Kojima left the company. On August 17, 2016, Konami announced during Gamescom 2016 that a new Metal Gear game was in the works, known as Metal Gear Survive. It is a spin-off game as well as a supplemental to Metal Gear Solid V as a whole, taking place between Ground Zeroes and The Phantom Pain.

On May 24, 2023, during Sony's PlayStation Showcase event, a remake of Snake Eater, titled Metal Gear Solid Delta: Snake Eater (Note: Stylized as Metal Gear Solid Δ: Snake Eater) was announced.

=== Re-releases ===
Expanded re-releases of games in the series were produced as well, such as Integral (Metal Gear Solid), Substance (Metal Gear Solid 2: Sons of Liberty), and Subsistence (Metal Gear Solid 3: Snake Eater).

On June 2, 2011, Konami announced the Metal Gear Solid HD Collection which was released in November 2011 for both the PlayStation 3 and Xbox 360. The collection features remastered versions of Metal Gear Solid 2: Sons of Liberty, Metal Gear Solid 3: Snake Eater, and Metal Gear Solid: Peace Walker, rendered in 720p and running at 60fps, including Trophies/Achievements, and remastered audio. On August 15, 2011, UK retailer Zavvi secured the exclusive right to sell the Metal Gear Solid: Ultimate HD Collection only available for the PlayStation 3, which was released on November 25.

Metal Gear Solid: Master Collection was announced on May 24, 2023 as a series of new compilations of various games in the franchise remastered for current-generation platforms. Vol. 1, which released on October 24, 2023, collects the first five mainline Metal Gear games alongside the non-canon NES games Metal Gear and Snake's Revenge, and the digital graphic novel adaptations of Metal Gear Solid and Sons of Liberty. Vol. 2 was announced in February 2026 and released on August 27, 2026, comprising the first ever port of Metal Gear Solid 4: Guns of the Patriots alongside the 'HD Edition' of Metal Gear Solid: Peace Walker, while an emulation of the non-canon Game Boy Color title Metal Gear: Ghost Babel (2000) as a bonus game. Both collections include extras such as lore books, game screenplays, selected soundtracks, character dossiers and gameplay guides. In addition, Vol. 2 includes a full restoration of the Metal Gear Solid 4 Database, which collects and presents the entire series' canon up to the game's original release, using Unreal Engine 5.

== Storyline ==
In the Metal Gear universe, history had diverged sometime after World War I, with the founding of the Philosophers, a fictional secret pact between the United States, China, and the Soviet Union. They created the fictional Cobra Unit, led by The Boss, being instrumental in the defeat of the Axis Powers. Cloning, AI and robotics technology of the 1970s are more advanced. The nine games in the main Metal Gear series continuity reveal a narrative that spans five decades, from the Cold War, until the near future. Big Boss is the most relevant character within the story of the series and, of the main games, four are prequels centering on his story, set decades before the events of the original Metal Gear. However, Solid Snake is still depicted as the primary main character of the series, as the prequels create context of his purpose and him being the antithesis of his father.

=== Plot ===
Metal Gear Solid 3: Snake Eater which is chronologically the first game in the series, introduces Naked Snake (or Snake for short), an operative working for the fictional Force Operation X (FOX) unit of the CIA during the Cold War. The game focuses on the rise of Snake from an apprentice to a legendary soldier, as well as the downfall of his mentor and matriarchal figure, The Boss. After The Boss defects to the Soviet Union, Snake is sent into Russia to kill her and end the threat posed by Yevgeny Borisovitch Volgin, a GRU colonel with plans to overthrow the Soviet government. Snake's heroics during the game earn him the nickname "Big Boss" at the end. The origins of The Patriots, an organization founded by Zero, are also explored.

Metal Gear Solid: Portable Ops serves as a direct sequel to Snake Eater and follows Naked Snake's life after disbanding from FOX. With Snake not yet accepting the Big Boss codename, the plot features the origins of his mercenary unit as he attempts to escape the San Hieronymo Peninsula and battles his old unit. The canonicity of Portable Ops is disputed, with Kojima having stated that "the main story of Portable Ops is part of the Saga, is part of the official Metal Gear timeline, while some of the small details that are in Portable Ops are outside the Saga, not part of the main timeline of the game."

The next game, Metal Gear Solid: Peace Walker, is set ten years after the events of Snake Eater and returns to the story of the young Big Boss. Now the head of the mercenary corporation Militaires Sans Frontières (MSF), Big Boss discovers that nuclear warheads are being transported to Latin America and decides that he must put a stop to it. Peace Walker features a new cast of characters to provide both aid and intelligence for Big Boss. A few characters from later games, such as a younger Kazuhira Miller, make appearances in the game.

Metal Gear Solid V: The Phantom Pain, serves as the direct sequel to Peace Walker and is composed of two chapters. The prologue, Ground Zeroes, is set a few weeks after the final mission in Peace Walker, as Big Boss is tasked with rescuing two VIPs from a U.S. military black site on the coast of Cuba. Big Boss' mission coincides with a visit to Mother Base by the IAEA, which turns out to be a cover for an attack on Mother Base orchestrated by the mysterious organization XOF. In the chaos, Big Boss' helicopter first gets disabled by a bomb implanted inside of Paz, then collides with a following helicopter, and he is then sent to the hospital for nine years, which leads to the events of the main chapter, The Phantom Pain. The basis of the main story revolves around Big Boss forming a new private military company, the Diamond Dogs to retaliate for the destruction of MSF and the loss of his comrades. However, this "Big Boss" is revealed to be a part of the medical staff who survived the helicopter crash, who was brainwashed to believe himself to be Big Boss, while the real Big Boss went into hiding to create Outer Heaven, a place where soldiers can live without having to abide by any particular ideology.

The first Metal Gear game for the MSX follows Solid Snake, a rookie of the FOXHOUND special operations unit. He is sent by his superior Big Boss to the fortress in South Africa known as Outer Heaven, with the goal of finding the missing squad member Gray Fox and investigating a weapon known as Metal Gear. However, after Snake unexpectedly completes his goals, Big Boss is revealed to be the leader of Outer Heaven, which he has created as a place for soldiers to fight free of any ideology that he believes has been forced upon them by governments. He fights Snake and is killed. However, it turns out that this was actually the body double from Metal Gear Solid V: The Phantom Pain. In Metal Gear 2: Solid Snake the real Big Boss has established a new military nation, Zanzibar Land, and he and Snake face off again, with Snake achieving victory and seemingly killing Big Boss for good.

Metal Gear Solid elaborates on the storyline of the earlier games and reveals that Solid Snake is a genetic clone of Big Boss, created as part of a secret government project. An antagonist is introduced in the form of Liquid Snake, Snake's twin brother who takes control of FOXHOUND after Snake's retirement. Liquid and FOXHOUND take control of a nuclear weapons disposal facility in Alaska and commandeer REX, the next-generation Metal Gear weapons platform being tested there. They threaten to detonate REX's warhead unless the government turns over the remains of Big Boss. Solid Snake destroys Metal Gear REX and kills the renegade FOXHOUND members, with the exception of Revolver Ocelot.

A third Snake brother known as Solidus Snake is introduced as the United States President at the end of Metal Gear Solid and serves as the main antagonist of Metal Gear Solid 2: Sons of Liberty. During his time as president, Solidus became aware of a secretive cabal known as "The Patriots" who were steadily manipulating the course of history. After his tenure as president is over, Solidus takes control of the "Big Shell" offshore facility, which is being used to develop Arsenal Gear, a mobile undersea fortress designed to house and protect a network of AIs created to influence human development by filtering the availability of information across the Internet. The game is set four years after Liquid's death in Metal Gear Solid, and it puts the player in control of Raiden, a soldier who fights against Solidus, who is revealed to be his former commander during his time as a child soldier. Raiden joins forces with Snake and learns that they are being manipulated by Revolver Ocelot, who has been working for the Patriots. At the end of the game, Ocelot seemingly becomes possessed by Liquid Snake as the nanomachines from Liquid's arm (which Ocelot took to replace his own arm after Gray Fox slices it off in Metal Gear Solid) work their way into Ocelot's thought process.

Metal Gear Solid 4: Guns of the Patriots deals with a rapidly aging Solid Snake (now branded "Old Snake") who is on a mission to find and defeat Revolver Ocelot, now known as Liquid Ocelot. Despite the destruction of the Arsenal Gear in Sons of Liberty, the Patriots have continued in their plans to influence the course of human history, installing artificial intelligence systems around the world. Ocelot, opposed to this, has assembled armies with which to fight back and intends to hijack their entire operating system for his own ends. Solid Snake's objective later changes to destroying the AIs of the Patriots and stop their oppression. After he and his allies succeed, Snake decides to live out his life peacefully.

Metal Gear Rising: Revengeance is set four years after Guns of the Patriots and it stars Raiden as a cyborg ninja mercenary. Raiden joins the private military firm, Maverick Security Consulting, and is tasked with defending the prime minister of an unspecified African country. However, the situation goes awry and the prime minister is killed by a rival PMC company named Desperado Enforcement LLC. Raiden is defeated in the battle, but decides to re-avenge his failure and is sent out with a brand new cyborg body to fight the mysterious military group.

=== Tone and themes ===
The original Metal Gear, which was released in 1987 during the Cold War, dealt with the manipulation of soldiers by politicians of the East and West, countered by the concept of "Outer Heaven", a country without politics. Its sequel Metal Gear 2: Solid Snake, which was released in 1990 at the end of the Cold War, expanded on this with themes regarding political intrigue, battlefield ethics, military history, and the negative effects of warfare.

The overarching theme of the Metal Gear Solid series is that of the "gene, meme, scene, sense, peace, revenge and race," and how people are affected by these factors according to the game's producer Kojima—Metal Gear Solid deals with genetics and the moral implications of genetic engineering, Metal Gear Solid 2: Sons of Liberty deals with how identity can be affected by the philosophies of one's society (a "meme") and the effects of censorship on society, Metal Gear Solid 3: Snake Eater deals with how the time and place one lives in (a "scene") affects their identity, how politics change along with the times and hyperreality, the inability to distinguish fact and fiction in an information-saturated world.

Metal Gear Solid 4: Guns of the Patriots deals with "sense", which is a person's understanding of the world that is lost when they die. It also encompasses how some things cannot be passed down to future generations and be misinterpreted as well as the artificially controlled (and globally shared) sense-data of the new era's nanotech-enhanced soldiers. With Metal Gear Solid: Peace Walker the plot deals with the true nature of 'peace', and the concept of conflict in human societies. Metal Gear Solid V: The Phantom Pain deals with the themes "race" and "revenge" and how the latter can make one lose their humanity. Following the initial Metal Gear, each game has been a deconstruction of action movies and video games, using tropes to invoke the themes and ideas especially those of spy movies - it examines what kind of mind and complete control of a situation would be needed to pull off the absurdly complex and convoluted plans that rely on events completely within the realm of chance yet comes off without a hitch. Furthermore, it examines what happens to a child soldier forced to take up a normal life through the characters Eli (also known as Liquid Snake) in Metal Gear Solid V: The Phantom Pain and Jack (primarily known as Raiden) in Metal Gear Solid 4: Guns of the Patriots.

Metal Gear Rising: Revengeance also deals with "revenge". Raiden is defeated in the beginning and feels a deep sense of vengeance, and as such exacts his 'revenge' on the group who sabotaged him, as well as coming to terms with his own past and embracing his true nature. The games carry many implicit parallels to Nietzschean philosophy. Solid Snake serves as a deconstruction of the action hero archetype, as his wartime experiences have turned him into a bitter, broken-down soldier who wishes to retire, but cannot escape the life of conflict that had entwined him for so long. This concept is further explored through Raiden, who is put through the same torments as Snake in explicit detail. Big Boss is similarly not immune to this theme: as Naked Snake, he does not resemble a suave, impeccable secret agent that would otherwise fit into the 1960s spy film pastiche of Metal Gear Solid 3: Snake Eater, but is instead an everyman character. Only after undergoing immense psychological and physical scarring does he begin to resemble the ultimate soldier known as Big Boss.

Although the series takes place in a realistic military setting, the Metal Gear video games also feature a strong focus on supernatural elements, leading the series to be commonly described as magic realism.

=== Characters ===
From top to bottom: Big Boss, Liquid Snake, and Solid Snake, three central characters in the Metal Gear series, as drawn by Yoji Shinkawa

In games, players control a character who has to infiltrate into his enemy's area alone to complete his mission. Across the mission, the player receives assistance from a supporting team communicated by Codec. While the team tells the player hints about the mission, it also helps expand the characters through their interactions. During their debuts, player characters Solid Snake and Raiden are meant to represent the player while in the following games they acquire more defined personalities. A common motif in the series is the use of powerful enemies. As games were released, new concepts were given to the bosses to make them innovative and notice their strength. As the first games used humans with supernatural abilities, for Metal Gear Solid 4, the designers decided to use monsters rather than humans as enemies. A notable boss battle was The End from Metal Gear Solid 3 that was meant to differentiate it from all the other bosses in the franchise due to its strategic gameplay. Another common motif has been the transformation of a previously normal character returning as a ninja. It started with Kyle Schneider in Metal Gear 2: Solid Snake when he fought against Snake as "Black Ninja". Several other characters have done the same, including Gray Fox, Olga Gurlukovich, and Raiden.

Much as Metal Gear began as partially a pastiche of action movies of the time, characters were sometimes pastiches of contemporary action movie heroes. Metal Gear Solid characters have been designed by Yoji Shinkawa. Several of their real names and aliases are references to various Hollywood films. Because of the time skip between games, a few of the characters have been redesigned to fit in the game's year. With the improvements from new video game consoles like the PlayStation and PlayStation 2, the staff gave the characters a more realistic look although they initially had doubts about it. Kojima's thoughts regarding Snake's improved abilities by the time of Metal Gear Solid led to the concept of cloned characters who would be able to match him in combat. By Metal Gear Solid 2, Kojima was inspired by the Sherlock Holmes novels to introduce a sidekick character in order to view Snake from a different perspective.

== Development ==
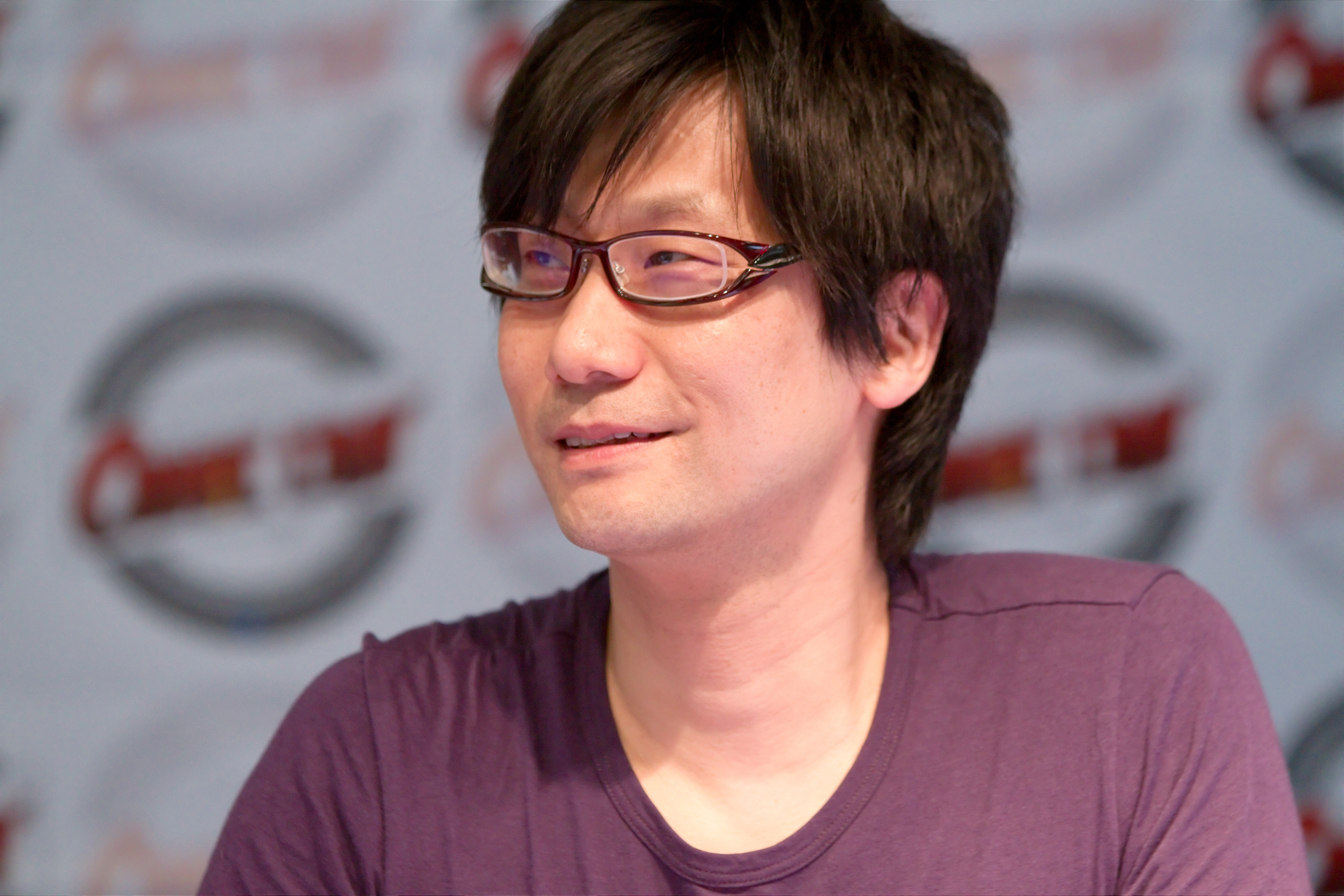
Hideo Kojima is the franchise's creator and was involved in directing, designing, writing and producing the majority of installments in the main series until Metal Gear Solid V: The Phantom Pain (2015).

The first Metal Gear game was intended to be an action game that featured modern military combat. However, the MSX2's hardware limited the number of on-screen bullets and enemies, which Hideo Kojima felt impeded the combat aspect. Inspired by The Great Escape, he altered the gameplay to focus on a prisoner escaping. In a series of articles written for Official PlayStation 2 Magazine, Hideo Kojima identified several Hollywood films as the primary sources of inspiration for the storylines and gameplay of the Metal Gear series. He further noted that the James Bond series is what influenced him the most regarding the creation of Metal Gear Solid. The original plot has references to the nuclear war paranoia during the mid-1980s that resulted from the Cold War. Following games would revolve around nuclear weapon inspections in Iraq and Iran, but this idea was left out due to growing concern regarding the political situation in the Middle East. Other changes to the series were made in Metal Gear Solid 2 as a result of the September 11 attacks.

After Metal Gear 2: Solid Snake, Kojima planned to release the third Metal Gear game for the 3DO Interactive Multiplayer in 1994. Besides changing the game's platform to the PlayStation, the game was renamed, and its subsequent sequels were given the word "Solid" as the series started using 3D computer graphics. Since then, the games were designed to be more realistic to further entertain the players. Metal Gear Solid 3 was initially meant to be made for the PlayStation 3, but due to the long wait for the console, the game was developed for the PlayStation 2 instead. As previous game's settings were indoors areas due to difficulties with the consoles, since Metal Gear Solid 3, Kojima wished to drastically change it despite difficulties. Since Metal Gear Solid 2: Sons of Liberty had several plot points unresolved, it was originally meant to leave it to players to discuss them to come to their own conclusions. This has led to consistency issues in the English versions of Metal Gear Solid and Metal Gear Solid 2 as they mentioned plot elements that were further explored in Metal Gear Solid 4.

== Related media ==
=== Printed adaptations ===
A novel adaptation of the original Metal Gear was published in 1988 as a part of Scholastic's Worlds of Power line of novelizations, which were based on third-party NES games. It was written by Alexander Frost. The novelization is not based on the game's official storyline, but rather on Konami of America's localization of the plot. The book takes further liberties by giving Solid Snake the name of Justin Halley, and by changing the name of Snake's unit from FOXHOUND to the "Snake Men". In Japan, a Metal Gear gamebook was published on March 31, 1988, shortly after the release of the game on the Famicom. It is set two years after the events of the original Metal Gear and is part of the Konami Gamebook Series. A novelization of Metal Gear Solid was published in 2008. It was written by Raymond Benson, the author of nine James Bond novels. Benson also wrote a Metal Gear Solid 2: Sons of Liberty novelization, which was published in 2009. Critical reaction to Benson's novelizations has been generally positive, with Bookgasm.com writing that "Benson does a fine job translating the game to the page" with Metal Gear Solid, and MishMashMagazine.com calling Metal Gear Solid 2: Sons of Liberty "a great companion to the game". A Japanese-language novelization of Metal Gear Solid 4: Guns of the Patriots by Project Itoh was published on June 12, 2008. The novel was translated into English by Viz Media and was released on June 19, 2012.

A comic book adaptation of the original Metal Gear Solid was published by IDW Publishing in 2004. It was written by Kris Oprisko and with illustrations by Ashley Wood. A comic book adaptation of Metal Gear Solid 2: Sons of Liberty has also been published by IDW, written by Alex Garner with illustrations by Ashley Wood. The series lasted 24 issues and has been collected in two trade paperbacks as well as a single hardback collector's edition which is currently out-of-print. The entire run of the comic was collected again in a paperback book, Metal Gear Solid Omnibus, and released in June 2010. A digital version of the first comic book adaptation was released for the PlayStation Portable, Metal Gear Solid: Digital Graphic Novel, in 2006. A second digital version, Metal Gear Solid 2: Bande Dessinée, was released exclusively in Japan as a DVD release in 2008 and features fully voiced versions of both comic book adaptations. All the Japanese voice actors from the games reprised their roles with the exception of those that have died.

=== CDs ===
A radio drama based on the original Metal Gear Solid aired in Japan from 1998 to 1999 as part of Konami's syndicated CLUB db program. Directed by Shuyo Murata and written by Motosada Mori, the serial lasted over 12 weekly installments spanning three story arcs. The series was later collected as a two-volume set. The series serves as an alternate continuation to the events of Shadow Moses, with Solid Snake, Meryl Silverburgh, Mei Ling, and Roy Campbell going on further missions as FOXHOUND operatives (Mei Ling and Meryl are depicted wearing a battle dress uniform and a sneaking suit respectively), although the stories are not considered part of the mainstream Metal Gear canon. The Japanese voice actors from the game reprised their roles for the series, while new characters are introduced as well.

Several promotional DVDs have been released detailing the Metal Gear series. Metal Gear Saga vol. 1 was released in 2006 as a pre-order disc for MGS3: Subsistence. It is divided into five chapters, each dealing with one game of the then five-part Metal Gear series in chronological order (beginning with MGS3), and each includes discussions by Hideo Kojima. Metal Gear Saga vol. 2 was first shown at the 20th Metal Gear Anniversary Party, and then released as a pre-order disc for MGS4. In this, the video is presented as a pseudo-documentary about Solid Snake and is divided into a prologue and four chapters: Naked Snake-the birth of Snake (chronicling the events of MGS3, MG1, and MG2), Liquid Snake-the second snake (MGS), Solidus Snake-the third Snake (MGS2) and Solid Snake-the first Snake (setting the stage for MGS4).

=== Toys ===
In 1999, McFarlane Toys, with the collaboration of Konami, launched a series of action figures depicting key characters from Metal Gear Solid. In 2001, following the success of the first series, and with the release of Metal Gear Solid 2: Sons of Liberty, McFarlane Toys, and Konami combined their efforts to produce a line of action figures depicting Sons of Liberty's main characters. Each character has a piece of Metal Gear RAY, so collecting the entire set is essential to build the robot.

Konami has also released 4" scale blind-box figures based on MGS2 released in Japan, Sons of Liberty in 2002 and Substance shortly after in 2003; the Substance series was eventually brought to the US and UK markets packaged on card rather than blind boxed. During the release of MGS3, Medicom released 12" figures of Snake as part of their Real Action Heroes line. Medicom continued to support the franchise with the release of Kubrick figures for Snake Eater and Guns of the Patriots, which also included seven- and 12-inch versions of the game's characters.

In 2009, toy company ThreeA joined forces with Kojima to make related products. The first fruition of this partnership came in late 2012, when ThreeA released a massive 1/48 scale figure of Metal Gear REX, with working LED lights. It can also be dressed up to depict REX's decrepit condition in Guns of the Patriots. The company is also cooperating with graphic artist Ashley Wood to develop a similarly scaled Metal Gear RAY. A prototype was first unveiled at the ReVenture hobby show in Hong Kong in April 2012.

Square Enix also joined the production of toys based on the franchise starting with the boss vehicles and characters from Metal Gear Solid: Peace Walker. The toys, which are from Square's Play Arts Kai line, were released in 2010. The line has since expanded to include characters from Metal Gear Solid, Sons of Liberty, Ground Zeroes, and The Phantom Pain, with the detail more pronounced than the original McFarlane Toys figures.

In 2012, Hot Toys released a 1/6th action figure of Naked Snake in his original sneaking suit attire from MGS3, as well as the Boss.

To celebrate the franchise's 25th anniversary, model kit company Kotobukiya released a 1/100 scale Metal Gear REX, which features small figures of Solid Snake, Liquid Snake, and Gray Fox in both standing and near-death versions., and later followed suit with RAY. Kaiyodo's Revoltech action figure line includes versions of Big Boss from Peace Walker and Raiden from Rising: Revengeance, plus Venom Snake and a generic Soviet Army soldier from The Phantom Pain for the smaller RevoMini action figure category.

=== Soundtracks ===
Soundtracks for the first two games were produced by Iku Mizutani, Shigehiro Takenouchi, and Motoaki Furukawa. For Metal Gear Solid, Kojima wanted "a full orchestra right next to the player"; a system which made modifications such as tempo and texture to the currently playing track, instead of switching to another pre-recorded track. Although these features could not be achieved at that time, they were implemented in Metal Gear Solid 2: Sons of Liberty. Hideo Kojima's choice of Harry Gregson-Williams, a Hollywood film composer from Hans Zimmer's studio, as the composer for Metal Gear Solid 2 was highly publicized in the run-up to the game's release. Gregson-Williams would reprise his role in Metal Gear Solid 3 and Metal Gear Solid 4. Starting with Metal Gear Solid, theme songs have been provided by popular artists such as Rika Muranaka. Several soundtracks based on the games have also been published.

=== Film adaptation ===
In May 2006, Metal Gear series creator Hideo Kojima announced that an English-language film adaptation of Metal Gear Solid was in early development. Kojima further revealed at the Electronic Entertainment Expo later that month that he had negotiated a contract with a party in Hollywood to adapt the video game into a film, though no further details were shared at that time. In February 2007, it was announced that the movie would be developed at Sony Pictures Entertainment, with Michael De Luca producing and Kojima as executive producer. Producers expressed interest in Kurt Wimmer as writer and/or director, or Paul Thomas Anderson to direct; Kojima was quick to quell rumors that German director Uwe Boll was a possible contender. Screenwriter David Hayter (also the English voice actor for Solid Snake) and director Paul W. S. Anderson expressed their interest. For his part, Kojima stated that he did not have a desire to write or direct the Metal Gear Solid movie himself. Kojima expressed interest in casting Viggo Mortensen as Snake; Christian Bale, who had been rumored to be involved, denied he had been approached for Metal Gear Solid. Ultimately, before any cast or crew could be signed to the project, De Luca revealed in January 2010 that work on the film adaptation had been halted indefinitely. Citing a lack of a "coordinated will" between parties, De Luca particularly noted that Konami was concerned the entire Metal Gear franchise could be negatively affected if the movie were to underperform.

The project was re-announced at the Metal Gear 25th Anniversary on August 30, 2012: Hideo Kojima announced that Arad Productions (led by Avi Arad) would produce the Metal Gear Solid movie for Columbia Pictures, with Sony Pictures in charge of distribution. On June 3, 2014, Deadline Hollywood reported that Sony was in talks with Jordan Vogt-Roberts to direct the film; he was confirmed to be attached as director of the project in 2015. Vogt-Roberts, a longtime fan of the series who met with Hideo Kojima as he joined the production, emphasized his desire to capture the "tricky and idiosyncratic" tone of Kojima's writing, and to depict the "sprawling" and "convoluted" nature of the series rather than solely adapting the 1998 game. Jay Basu was initially announced as screenwriter in 2015, though Derek Connolly was hired to rewrite the script in November 2017. Connolly completed the first draft of the film's screenplay in July 2018, and another draft in December 2019; five years later, however, work on the script was still in progress. For the role of Solid Snake, Kojima mentioned having originally wanted a "big star" (suggesting Hugh Jackman) but considered a relative unknown might be better; In December 2020, Oscar Isaac was cast as Snake.

In April 2026, it was announced that Zach Lipovsky and Adam Stein had been hired as directors on the film, replacing Vogt-Roberts, following them signing a first-look deal with Sony Pictures. That same month, Isaac stated in an interview that he was no longer attached to the project.

== Reception and legacy ==
Aggregate review scores As of January 5, 2026.
Game	Metacritic
Metal Gear Solid	(PS1) 94 (PC) 83
Metal Gear Solid: VR Missions	-
Metal Gear: Ghost Babel	-
Metal Gear Solid 2: Sons of Liberty	(PS2) 96
Metal Gear Solid 2: Substance	(Xbox) 87 (PS2) 87 (PC) 77
Metal Gear Solid: The Twin Snakes	(GCN) 85
Metal Gear Solid 3: Snake Eater	(PS2) 91
Metal Gear Solid 3: Subsistence	(PS2) 94
Metal Gear Acid	(PSP) 75
Metal Gear Acid 2	(PSP) 80
Metal Gear Solid: Digital Graphic Novel	(PSP) 78
Metal Gear Solid: Portable Ops	(PSP) 87
Metal Gear Solid: Portable Ops Plus	(PSP) 65
Metal Gear Solid 4: Guns of the Patriots	(PS3) 94
Metal Gear Solid: Peace Walker	(PSP) 89
Metal Gear Solid HD Collection	(X360) 90 (PS3) 89 (Vita) 81
Metal Gear Solid: Snake Eater 3D	(3DS) 78
Metal Gear Rising: Revengeance	(PC) 83 (X360) 82 (PS3) 80
Metal Gear Solid: The Legacy Collection	(PS3) 93
Metal Gear Solid V: Ground Zeroes	(PC) 80 (XONE) 76 (PS4) 75 (PS3) 66
Metal Gear Solid V: The Phantom Pain	(PC) 91 (PS4) 93 (XONE) 95
Metal Gear Survive	(PC) 54 (PS4) 60 (XONE) 62
Metal Gear Solid Delta: Snake Eater	(PC) 83 (PS5) 85 (XSXS) 83

The Metal Gear franchise has sold over 65.5 million copies as of December 2025. By February 2007, the series had grossed more than $1 billion (equivalent to between $1.6–2.8 billion adjusted for inflation) from 20 million copies sold, in addition to having sold ancillary merchandise including 3 million strategy guides, 1.5 million action figures and 200,000 comic books. As of 2019, the franchise has grossed about $2.5 billion worldwide.

Metal Gear Solid 2: Sons of Liberty sold 7.03 million copies worldwide, and is followed in sales by Metal Gear Solid with over 7 million copies sold, and then Metal Gear Solid 4: Guns of the Patriots and Metal Gear Solid V: The Phantom Pain, each with over 6 million copies sold. According to Chart-Track, Metal Gear Solid 4: Guns of the Patriots was the second fastest-selling PlayStation 3 game in the United Kingdom after Grand Theft Auto IV. The Phantom Pain grossed $179 million on release day, higher than the combined opening day box office of the films Avengers: Age of Ultron and Jurassic World. The PlayStation Portable games were met with notably lower sales, but it has been analyzed that this was because of the low sales of the console when the games were released. Metal Gear Survive, the first Metal Gear game to be developed since series creator Hideo Kojima left Konami, sold only a fraction of the sales made by Metal Gear Solid V: The Phantom Pain.

The series as a whole (namely concerning the Kojima-directed titles) is often regarded as one of the most influential of all time and has received largely critical acclaim from critics and players. Most of the numbered installments are considered to be some of the greatest video games of all time. Metal Gear Solid 2: Sons of Liberty currently possesses 95.09% on GameRankings and 96/100 on Metacritic, making it the highest-scoring game of the series to date. In 2002, IGN's editors ranked Metal Gear Solid as the best PlayStation game ever. In Game Informer Magazine's list of top 200 games of all time, Metal Gear Solid 2 ranked at No. 50 on the list. Metal Gear Solid 3: Snake Eater was also voted as the fifth greatest PlayStation game in a poll from PlayStation Official Magazine (UK). Metal Gear Solid and Metal Gear Solid 2 were featured in the Smithsonian American Art Museum's "The Art of Video Games" exhibition taking place from March 16 to September 30, 2012. Games have won multiple awards such as Metal Gear Solid, which won the "Excellence Award for Interactive Art" by the Japan Media Arts Festival, and Metal Gear Solid 2, which was given the Game of the Year award by Game Informer.

Metal Gear was the first mainstream stealth game, with the player starting the game unarmed, and sold over a million copies in the United States. Metal Gear 2: Solid Snake evolved the stealth gameplay of its predecessor and is considered one of the best 8-bit games of all time. Metal Gear and Metal Gear 2 are credited with pioneering stealth mechanics. Metal Gear Solid, which debuted at the 1996 Tokyo Game Show, was the first 3D stealth game, and is credited with popularizing the stealth game genre, as well as the hiding-behind-cover mechanic. The series pioneered the integration of cinematic techniques into video games, especially Metal Gear Solid which Eurogamer considers the "first modern video game".

Several boss fights have been praised for their variety and strategy required to beat them. The series is notorious for its fourth wall breaking scenes. The storyline has been commented to maintain "rich characterization" while touching on some controversial themes. Hideo Kojima's ambitious script in Metal Gear Solid 2 has been praised, some calling it the first example of a postmodern video game, while others have argued that it anticipated concepts such as post-truth politics, fake news, echo chambers and alternative facts. The series' storytelling in general has received praise for being among "the most fascinating science fiction stories in any medium". The series' cutscenes have often been praised for their graphics and the characters' stunt performances. Nevertheless, a common criticism has been the scenes' lengthiness, as well as some parts of the storyline. Raiden's unexpected introduction as the main protagonist in Metal Gear Solid 2, due to his lack of appearances in the games' trailers and how he replaces fan-favorite character Solid Snake, has been deemed as one of the most controversial parts of the entire series. The series' audio has been acclaimed to the point of receiving awards for its use of sound and music.

The Metal Gear series inspired numerous video game developers. Splinter Cell and Far Cry 2 designer Clint Hocking stated that every stealth-action game "owes its existence to the success of Metal Gear" and that, "Without Metal Gear, there would be no stealth games." Splinter Cell producer Mathieu Ferland said "Metal Gear Solid was a huge inspiration for Splinter Cell" and it "was a pioneer for both the genre and the quality of directing". Silicon Knights founder Denis Dyack said Metal Gear Solid's "story, script, characters, voice acting, and cinemas" were "a landmark" and "guiding light to the future of videogames." Unreal and Gears of War creator Cliff Bleszinski cited the military themes and action gameplay of Metal Gear as a major influence on his work, and he named Gears of War in homage to Metal Gear. Tenchu creator Takuma Endo cited the early 2D Metal Gear games as an influence. Thief creator Tom Leonard said Metal Gear Solid's success convinced them that experimental stealth gameplay could be marketable and "revitalized the team" in "the closing months of the project." Sumo Digital designer Emily Knox cited Metal Gear Solid as an early formative influence on their work. Crysis 2 animator Luke Kelly said the game's animations were inspired by Metal Gear Solid 4. Neil Druckmann cited the revelation of Raiden in Metal Gear Solid 2 as an influence on The Last of Us Part II (2020).

Beyond video games, filmmaker Jordan Peele cited the series as an inspiration, particularly Metal Gear Solid 2. Several critics have also drawn comparisons between the Metal Gear Solid series, especially Metal Gear Solid 2, and the Marvel Cinematic Universe film Captain America: The Winter Soldier (2014).
