= List of Metal Gear media =

The Metal Gear series has seen releases on several different media. This includes promotional material such as toys, artwork, and guides.

Metal Gear is a stealth action video game series created by Hideo Kojima and developed and published by Konami. The series debuted in Japan on July 12, 1987, with Metal Gear and is one of Konami's best-selling franchises, with over 26.5 million units sold. The games take place in a semi-fictional universe with stories that involve a special forces agent (Solid Snake in most games) who is forced to destroy the latest incarnation of the superweapon Metal Gear, as well as having to rescue various hostages and neutralize certain renegade units in the process. Metal Gear titles have been released on numerous video game consoles, handheld game consoles, and personal computer platforms. Related novels, comics, and other dramatizations have also been released. A few of the series' main characters have also appeared in other Konami games.

The first game was followed by a heavily modified port for the Nintendo Entertainment System (NES), developed without Kojima's involvement. This game earned enough popularity to garner a sequel, again without Kojima's involvement, released outside Japan. The development of this game inspired Kojima to make an official sequel, Metal Gear 2: Solid Snake. As the series moved into three-dimensional graphics, Kojima decided to title the next game in the series Metal Gear Solid instead of Metal Gear 3; the "Solid" title has been used for all 3D action Metal Gear games since. Several non-action games have also been released, including the Metal Gear Acid games, which have a card-based system of gameplay.

== Video games ==
=== Mainline ===
==== MSX2 ====
Game	Details
Metal Gear Original release date(s): JP: July 12, 1987; EU: September 1987	Release years by system: 1987 – MSX2; 2004 – Mobile phone (Japan); 2008 – Mobile phone (North America); 2009 – Wii (Virtual Console, Japan); 2020 – Microsoft Windows
Metal Gear Original release date(s): JP: July 12, 1987; EU: September 1987	Notes: The PlayStation 2 version was released as a component of Metal Gear Solid 3: Subsistence, while the PlayStation 3, Vita, and Xbox 360 versions were a component of its HD Edition in the Metal Gear Solid HD Collection
Metal Gear 2: Solid Snake Original release date(s): JP: July 20, 1990	Release years by system: 1990 – MSX2 (Japan only); 2004 – Mobile phone (Japan); 2010 – Wii (Virtual Console, Japan)
Metal Gear 2: Solid Snake Original release date(s): JP: July 20, 1990	Notes: The sequel to the original Metal Gear; The PlayStation 2 version was released as a component of Metal Gear Solid 3: Subsistence, while the PlayStation 3, Vita, and Xbox 360 versions were a component of its HD Edition in the Metal Gear Solid HD Collection

==== Solid series ====
Game	Details
Metal Gear Solid Original release date(s): JP: September 3, 1998; NA: October 21, 1998; PAL: February 26, 1999	Release years by system: 1998 – PlayStation; 2009 – PlayStation Store (PS one Classics)
Metal Gear Solid Original release date(s): JP: September 3, 1998; NA: October 21, 1998; PAL: February 26, 1999	Notes: The sequel to Metal Gear 2: Solid Snake; The first game in the series released on a fifth generation console
Metal Gear Solid 2: Sons of Liberty Original release date(s): NA: November 14, 2001; JP: November 29, 2001; EU: March 8, 2002	Release years by system: 2001 – PlayStation 2
Metal Gear Solid 2: Sons of Liberty Original release date(s): NA: November 14, 2001; JP: November 29, 2001; EU: March 8, 2002	Notes: The sequel to Metal Gear Solid; The first game in the series released on a sixth generation console
Metal Gear Solid 3: Snake Eater Original release date(s): NA: November 17, 2004; JP: December 16, 2004; EU: March 4, 2005; AU: March 17, 2005	Release years by system: 2004 – PlayStation 2
Metal Gear Solid 3: Snake Eater Original release date(s): NA: November 17, 2004; JP: December 16, 2004; EU: March 4, 2005; AU: March 17, 2005	Notes: The story is a prequel to the entire Metal Gear series
Metal Gear Solid 4: Guns of the Patriots Original release date(s): WW: June 12, 2008	Release years by system: 2008 – PlayStation 3
Metal Gear Solid 4: Guns of the Patriots Original release date(s): WW: June 12, 2008	Notes: The story continues from Metal Gear Solid 2: Sons of Liberty; The first game in the series released on a seventh generation console; A special edition PlayStation 3 console was produced and sold with this game as a bundle
Metal Gear Solid: Peace Walker Original release date(s): JP: April 28, 2010; NA: June 8, 2010; EU: June 18, 2010	Release years by system: 2010 – PlayStation Portable
Metal Gear Solid: Peace Walker Original release date(s): JP: April 28, 2010; NA: June 8, 2010; EU: June 18, 2010	Notes: Official sequel to Metal Gear Solid 3 written and directed by Hideo Kojima. It debuted on the PlayStation Portable, similarly to the earlier spinoff Metal Gear Solid: Portable Ops, but was later ported to home consoles via its HD Edition.
Metal Gear Solid V: Ground Zeroes Original release date(s): NA: March 18, 2014; EU: March 20, 2014; JP: March 20, 2014	Release years by system: 2014 – PlayStation 3, PlayStation 4, Xbox 360, Xbox One, Microsoft Windows
Metal Gear Solid V: Ground Zeroes Original release date(s): NA: March 18, 2014; EU: March 20, 2014; JP: March 20, 2014	Notes: Sequel to Metal Gear Solid: Peace Walker; The first game in the series released on two eighth generation consoles; Stand-alone prologue to Metal Gear Solid V: The Phantom Pain; "Metal Gear Solid V: The Definitive Experience" includes both "Metal Gear Solid V: Ground Zeroes" and Metal Gear Solid V: The Phantom Pain".
Metal Gear Solid V: The Phantom Pain Original release date(s): September 1, 2015	Release years by system: 2015 – PlayStation 3, PlayStation 4, Xbox 360, Xbox One, Microsoft Windows
Metal Gear Solid V: The Phantom Pain Original release date(s): September 1, 2015	Notes: The main portion of Metal Gear Solid V.; "Metal Gear Solid V: The Definitive Experience" includes both "Metal Gear Solid V: Ground Zeroes" and Metal Gear Solid V: The Phantom Pain".

===== Remakes and expanded editions =====
Game	Details
Metal Gear Solid: Integral Original release date(s): JP: June 24, 1999; NA: September 24, 2000; EU: October 20, 2000	Release years by system: 1999 – PlayStation (Japan only); 2000 – Microsoft Windows (North America and Europe)
Metal Gear Solid: Integral Original release date(s): JP: June 24, 1999; NA: September 24, 2000; EU: October 20, 2000	Notes: An expanded version of Metal Gear Solid with an additional disc with virtual reality (VR) training missions
Metal Gear Solid: VR Missions Original release date(s): NA: September 25, 1999; EU: October 29, 1999	Release years by system: 1999 – PlayStation
Metal Gear Solid: VR Missions Original release date(s): NA: September 25, 1999; EU: October 29, 1999	Notes: An English-language version of the VR disc from Metal Gear Solid: Integral; Released in Europe as Metal Gear Solid: Special Missions, where it was released as a "data disc" that required a copy of the original (PAL region) release of Metal Gear Solid.
Metal Gear Solid 2: Substance Original release date(s): NA: November 5, 2002; JP: December 19, 2002; EU: March 7, 2003	Release years by system: 2002 – Xbox, PlayStation 2; 2003 – Microsoft Windows (North America and Europe)
Metal Gear Solid 2: Substance Original release date(s): NA: November 5, 2002; JP: December 19, 2002; EU: March 7, 2003	Notes: An expanded version of Metal Gear Solid 2: Sons of Liberty
Metal Gear Solid: The Twin Snakes Original release date(s): NA: March 9, 2004; JP: March 11, 2004; EU: March 26, 2004	Release years by system: 2004 – GameCube
Metal Gear Solid: The Twin Snakes Original release date(s): NA: March 9, 2004; JP: March 11, 2004; EU: March 26, 2004	Notes: A remake of Metal Gear Solid; A special premium package released in Japan contained an emulated copy of the NES version of the original Metal Gear
Metal Gear Solid 3: Subsistence Original release date(s): JP: December 22, 2005; NA: March 14, 2006; EU: October 6, 2006; AU: October 13, 2006	Release years by system: 2005 – PlayStation 2
Metal Gear Solid 3: Subsistence Original release date(s): JP: December 22, 2005; NA: March 14, 2006; EU: October 6, 2006; AU: October 13, 2006	Notes: An expanded version of Metal Gear Solid 3: Snake Eater; Includes the mobile phone versions of MSX2 Metal Gear and Metal Gear 2: Solid Snake; Includes the first iteration of Metal Gear Online
Metal Gear Solid: Snake Eater 3D Original release date(s): NA: February 21, 2012; JP: March 8, 2012; EU: March 8, 2012; AU: March 8, 2012	Release years by system: 2012 – Nintendo 3DS
Metal Gear Solid: Snake Eater 3D Original release date(s): NA: February 21, 2012; JP: March 8, 2012; EU: March 8, 2012; AU: March 8, 2012	Notes: A remake of Metal Gear Solid 3: Snake Eater in 3D; Based on a tech demo shown at E3 2010 titled The Naked Sample, which showed off the 3D display capabilities of the Nintendo 3DS.
Metal Gear Solid Delta: Snake Eater Original release date(s): WW: August 28, 2025	Release years by system: 2025 – PlayStation 5, Xbox Series X/S, Microsoft Windows
Metal Gear Solid Delta: Snake Eater Original release date(s): WW: August 28, 2025	Notes: A remake of Metal Gear Solid 3: Snake Eater

===== Box sets and bundles =====
Game	Details
Metal Gear 20th Anniversary Metal Gear Solid Collection Original release date(s): JP: July 26, 2007	Release years by system: 2007 – PlayStation, PlayStation 2, PlayStation Portable
Metal Gear 20th Anniversary Metal Gear Solid Collection Original release date(s): JP: July 26, 2007	Notes: A limited edition box set released to commemorate the 20th anniversary of the original Metal Gear.; Contains Metal Gear Solid, Metal Gear Solid 2: Sons of Liberty, The Document of Metal Gear Solid 2, Metal Gear Solid 3: Subsistence (first disc only), a special disc containing Metal Gear and Metal Gear 2: Solid Snake, and Metal Gear Solid: Portable Ops on an exclusive UMD case.; Also contains the Metal Gear Saga DVD Video.; The four games in the set were also re-released individually on the same date with anniversary-themed packaging and corresponding bonus content.
Metal Gear Solid: The Essential Collection Original release date(s): NA: March 18, 2008	Release years by system: 2008 – PlayStation, PlayStation 2
Metal Gear Solid: The Essential Collection Original release date(s): NA: March 18, 2008	Notes: Includes Metal Gear Solid, Metal Gear Solid 2: Substance, and Metal Gear Solid 3: Subsistence (first disc only).
Metal Gear Solid HD Collection Original release date(s): JP: November 23, 2011; NA: November 8, 2011; EU: February 3, 2012; AU: February 16, 2012	Release years by system: 2011 – PlayStation 3, Xbox 360; 2012 – PlayStation Vita
Metal Gear Solid HD Collection Original release date(s): JP: November 23, 2011; NA: November 8, 2011; EU: February 3, 2012; AU: February 16, 2012	Notes: A compilation of remastered HD Edition-branded ports of previously released Metal Gear Solid games. It includes Metal Gear Solid 2: Sons of Liberty and Metal Gear Solid 3: Snake Eater on all three platforms, plus Metal Gear Solid: Peace Walker on the PS3 and Xbox 360 versions.; Features MSX2 editions of Metal Gear and Metal Gear 2: Solid Snake.; The home console versions have been upgraded to run at 720p and 60fps, with an aspect ratio of 16:9.; The retail version of Peace Walker HD Edition was sold separately in Japan.; Individual versions of the games were sold for download on the PlayStation Store and Xbox Games Store.
Metal Gear Solid: The Legacy Collection Original release date(s): NA: July 9, 2013; JP: July 11, 2013; EU: September 13, 2013	Release years by system: 2013 – PlayStation 3
Metal Gear Solid: The Legacy Collection Original release date(s): NA: July 9, 2013; JP: July 11, 2013; EU: September 13, 2013	Notes: 2-disc set containing the Metal Gear Solid HD Collection, Metal Gear Solid: Digital Graphic Novel and Metal Gear Solid 2: Digital Graphic Novel, and Metal Gear Solid 4: Guns of the Patriots.; Included vouchers for Metal Gear Solid and Metal Gear Solid: VR Missions from the PlayStation Store.
Metal Gear Solid V: The Definitive Experience Original release date(s): NA: October 11, 2016	Release years by system: 2016 – PlayStation 4, Xbox One, Microsoft Windows
Metal Gear Solid V: The Definitive Experience Original release date(s): NA: October 11, 2016	Notes: Includes both Metal Gear Solid V releases, Ground Zeroes and The Phantom Pain, in one bundle, alongside all previously released downloadable content for both games already included.
Metal Gear Solid: Master Collection Original release date(s): WW: October 24, 2023 (Vol. 1); WW: August 27, 2026 (Vol. 2)	Release years by system: 2023 – Nintendo Switch, PlayStation 4, PlayStation 5, Windows, Xbox Series X/S (Vol. 1); 2026 – Nintendo Switch, Nintendo Switch 2, PlayStation 5, Windows and Xbox Series X/S (Vol. 2)
Metal Gear Solid: Master Collection Original release date(s): WW: October 24, 2023 (Vol. 1); WW: August 27, 2026 (Vol. 2)	Notes: Vol. 1 includes Metal Gear (MSX and NES), Snake's Revenge, Metal Gear 2, Metal Gear Solid, Metal Gear Solid: VR Missions, Metal Gear Solid 2, Metal Gear Solid 3 alongside games guides, a sound selection of music from the series, and the motion comics Metal Gear Solid: Digital Graphic Novel and Metal Gear Solid 2: Bande Dessinée as bonuses.; Vol. 2 includes Metal Gear Solid 4: Guns of the Patriots, Metal Gear Solid: Peace Walker and Metal Gear: Ghost Babel

=== Spin-offs ===
==== NES ====
Game	Details
Metal Gear Original release date(s): JP: December 22, 1987; NA: June 1988; EU: March 1989	Release years by system: 1987 – Family Computer (Japan); 1988 – Nintendo Entertainment System (North America); 1990 – PC, Commodore 64; 2004 – GameCube (Japan only)
Metal Gear Original release date(s): JP: December 22, 1987; NA: June 1988; EU: March 1989	Notes: The NES version features several changes from the MSX2 original, and it is not considered part of the Metal Gear canon by series creator Hideo Kojima; The Japanese release of the GameCube title Metal Gear Solid: The Twin Snakes included an emulated version of the Famicom/NES edition.
Snake's Revenge Original release date(s): NA: April 1990; EU: March 26, 1992	Release years by system: 1990 – Nintendo Entertainment System
Snake's Revenge Original release date(s): NA: April 1990; EU: March 26, 1992	Notes: A sequel to the NES version of Metal Gear developed for the western market without the involvement of Hideo Kojima. It is non-canon to the mainline Metal Gear series.

==== Ghost Babel ====
Game	Details
Metal Gear: Ghost Babel Original release date(s): JP: April 27, 2000; NA: May 5, 2000; EU: May 5, 2000	Release years by system: 2000 – Game Boy Color
Metal Gear: Ghost Babel Original release date(s): JP: April 27, 2000; NA: May 5, 2000; EU: May 5, 2000	Notes: An alternate sequel to Metal Gear; The first Metal Gear game released on a portable console; Released in the west as Metal Gear Solid

==== Acid series ====
Game	Details
Metal Gear Acid Original release date(s): JP: December 16, 2004; NA: March 24, 2005; EU: September 1, 2005	Release years by system: 2004 – PlayStation Portable; 2008 – Mobile phone (Japan)
Metal Gear Acid Original release date(s): JP: December 16, 2004; NA: March 24, 2005; EU: September 1, 2005	Notes: Title rendered as Metal Gear AC!D; Released on mobile phones in Europe under the title of Metal Gear Acid Mobile. A 3D version was also available.
Metal Gear Acid 2 Original release date(s): JP: December 8, 2005; NA: March 21, 2006; EU: May 19, 2006	Release years by system: 2005 – PlayStation Portable; 2009 – Mobile phone (Japan)
Metal Gear Acid 2 Original release date(s): JP: December 8, 2005; NA: March 21, 2006; EU: May 19, 2006	Notes: The sequel to Metal Gear Acid; Title rendered as Metal Gear AC!D^{2}; A version was released for mobile phones in Europe titled Metal Gear Acid 2 Mobile. A 3D version was also available.

==== Online series ====
Game	Details
Metal Gear Online Original release date(s): JP: December 22, 2005; NA: March 14, 2006; EU: October 6, 2006; AU: October 13, 2006	Release years by system: 2005 – PlayStation 2
Metal Gear Online Original release date(s): JP: December 22, 2005; NA: March 14, 2006; EU: October 6, 2006; AU: October 13, 2006	Notes: Released as a component of Metal Gear Solid 3: Subsistence.; The servers for the Japanese version were discontinued on December 25, 2006. Hideo Kojima himself made an appearance as a player character during the final farewell event.; The servers for the U.S. and European versions followed suit by being discontinued a few months later on April 2, 2007.; A stand-alone version was released in Japan, bundled with a strategy guide by Enterbrain.
Metal Gear Online Original release date(s): WW: June 12, 2008	Release years by system: 2008 – PlayStation 3
Metal Gear Online Original release date(s): WW: June 12, 2008	Notes: The second iteration of Metal Gear Online.; Starter pack included with Metal Gear Solid 4: Guns of the Patriots; A stand-alone retail version was released in Japan on July 17, 2008 as a less expensive alternative.; Three expansion packs were released (Gene, Meme and Scene), each adding new maps and playable characters, along with other new features.; The worldwide servers were discontinued on June 12, 2012.
Metal Gear Arcade Original release date(s): WW: December 20, 2010	Release years by system: 2010 – Arcade
Metal Gear Arcade Original release date(s): WW: December 20, 2010	Notes: A port of Metal Gear Online for arcades; Uses 3D stereoscopic glasses
Metal Gear Online Original release date(s): WW: October 16, 2015	Release years by system: 2015 – PlayStation 4, Xbox One, PlayStation 3, Xbox 360; 2016 - Microsoft Windows (Steam)
Metal Gear Online Original release date(s): WW: October 16, 2015	Notes: The online multiplayer component of Metal Gear Solid V: The Phantom Pain.; The PC version was released a few months later on January 19, 2016.; An expansion pack, titled "Cloaked in Darkness", was released for all platforms on March 15, 2016.

==== Portable Ops series ====
Game	Details
Metal Gear Solid: Portable Ops Original release date(s): NA: December 5, 2006; JP: December 21, 2006; EU: May 4, 2007; AU: May 15, 2007; UK: May 25, 2007	Release years by system: 2006 – PlayStation Portable; 2016 – PlayStation Vita (download)
Metal Gear Solid: Portable Ops Original release date(s): NA: December 5, 2006; JP: December 21, 2006; EU: May 4, 2007; AU: May 15, 2007; UK: May 25, 2007	Notes: A spinoff of the series set after the events of Metal Gear Solid 3: Snake Eater; Originally promoted as the first mainline installment in the series released on a portable platform, it was developed by a different director and writer, with Kojima acting only as producer. As a result, it was later "demoted" to a side-work following the release of Peace Walker.
Metal Gear Solid: Portable Ops Plus Original release date(s): JP: September 20, 2007; NA: November 13, 2007; EU: March 28, 2008	Release years by system: 2007 – PlayStation Portable; 2016 – PlayStation Vita (download)
Metal Gear Solid: Portable Ops Plus Original release date(s): JP: September 20, 2007; NA: November 13, 2007; EU: March 28, 2008	Notes: A stand-alone expansion of Metal Gear Solid: Portable Ops

==== Rising ====
Game	Details
Metal Gear Rising: Revengeance Original release date(s): NA: February 19, 2013; JP: February 21, 2013; EU: February 22, 2013; AU: February 22, 2013	Release years by system: 2013 - PlayStation 3, Xbox 360, Microsoft Windows, OS X
Metal Gear Rising: Revengeance Original release date(s): NA: February 19, 2013; JP: February 21, 2013; EU: February 22, 2013; AU: February 22, 2013	Notes: First Metal Gear game released for the Xbox 360 that isn't an expanded port.

==== Survive ====
Game	Details
Metal Gear Survive Original release date(s): 2018	Release years by system: 2018 - Microsoft Windows, PlayStation 4, Xbox One
Metal Gear Survive Original release date(s): 2018	Notes: First Metal Gear video game produced since the dissolution of the original Kojima Productions.

=== Mobile games ===
Game	Details
Metal Gear Solid Mobile Original release date(s): NA: March 19, 2008; JP: December 11, 2008; EU: December 11, 2008	Release years by system: 2008 – Mobile phone (North America only), N-Gage
Metal Gear Solid Mobile Original release date(s): NA: March 19, 2008; JP: December 11, 2008; EU: December 11, 2008	Notes: The first game in the series to be released exclusively for mobile phones; The story is set between Metal Gear Solid and Metal Gear Solid 2, but is not considered canon
Metal Gear Solid Touch Original release date(s): NA: March 18, 2009; EU: March 18, 2009; AU: March 18, 2009; JP: March 19, 2009	Release years by system: 2009 – iPhone, iPod Touch
Metal Gear Solid Touch Original release date(s): NA: March 18, 2009; EU: March 18, 2009; AU: March 18, 2009; JP: March 19, 2009	Notes: Rail shooter based on Metal Gear Solid 4: Guns of the Patriots; The story is a retelling of Metal Gear Solid 4
Metal Gear Solid: Social Ops Original release date(s): JP: December 6, 2012	Release years by system: 2012 – iOS, Android

=== Other games ===
Game	Details
Snake's Revenge Original release date(s): US: 1990	Release years by system: 1990 – Handheld electronic game
Snake's Revenge Original release date(s): US: 1990	Notes: Handheld LCD port of the NES game published by Tiger Electronics
Metal Gear Solid: Snake Eater Original release date(s): JP: October 17, 2016	Release years by system: 2016 – Pachislot
Metal Gear Solid: Snake Eater Original release date(s): JP: October 17, 2016	Notes: Themed pachinko machine

== Other media ==
=== Interactive ===
Game	Details
The Document of Metal Gear Solid 2 Original release date(s): JP: September 12, 2002; NA: September 24, 2002; EU: March 28, 2003	Release years by system: 2002 – PlayStation 2
The Document of Metal Gear Solid 2 Original release date(s): JP: September 12, 2002; NA: September 24, 2002; EU: March 28, 2003	Notes: An interactive making-of documentary of Metal Gear Solid 2: Sons of Liberty; Included in the European version of Metal Gear Solid 2: Substance; Included in the Japanese 20th anniversary edition of Metal Gear Solid 2: Sons of Liberty
Metal Gear Solid: Digital Graphic Novel Original release date(s): NA: June 13, 2006; JP: September 21, 2006; EU: September 22, 2006	Release years by system: 2006 – PlayStation Portable
Metal Gear Solid: Digital Graphic Novel Original release date(s): NA: June 13, 2006; JP: September 21, 2006; EU: September 22, 2006	Notes: An interactive graphic novel adaptation of Metal Gear Solid with artwork by Ashley Wood; Known as Metal Gear Solid: Bande Dessinée in Japan
Metal Gear Solid 4 Database Original release date(s): JP: June 19, 2008; NA: June 19, 2008; EU: June 26, 2008	Release years by system: 2008 – PlayStation 3
Metal Gear Solid 4 Database Original release date(s): JP: June 19, 2008; NA: June 19, 2008; EU: June 26, 2008	Notes: An interactive encyclopedia of the Metal Gear series; Released as a free download to the PlayStation Store

=== DVD ===
Game	Details
Metal Gear Saga vol. 1 2006 – DVD	Notes: Released as a pre-order disc for Metal Gear Solid 3: Subsistence; Released with the Platinum Edition of Metal Gear Solid 3: Snake Eater in Europe
Metal Gear Saga vol. 2 2008 – DVD	Notes: Released as a pre-order disc for Metal Gear Solid 4: Guns of the Patriots; Released as Metal Gear Saga with the 20th anniversary package in Japan
Metal Gear Solid 2: Bande Dessinée: JP: June 12, 2008; – DVD	Notes: An animated graphic novel adaptation of Metal Gear Solid 2: Sons of Liberty with artwork by Ashley Wood; Known in Europe and North America as Metal Gear Solid 2: Digital Graphic Novel; Contains a fully voiced version of Metal Gear Solid: Digital Graphic Novel; Released as part of the Legacy Collection on Blu-Ray Disc, with English voice acting in western releases.

=== Printed ===
Game	Details
Metal Gear: JP: March 31, 1988; – Gamebook	Notes: A gamebook sequel to Metal Gear; Part of the Konami Gamebook Series (#2)
Metal Gear: NA: 1990; – Novel	Notes: A novel based on Metal Gear written by Alexander Frost and published by Scholastic; Part of the Worlds of Power series (book #2)
Metal Gear Solid: NA: June 16, 2005; – Comic book	Notes: A comic book adaptation of Metal Gear Solid written by Kris Oprisko and illustrated by Ashley Wood; Originally published as a 12-issue series.
Metal Gear Solid: Sons of Liberty: NA: May 1, 2006; – Comic book	Notes: A comic book adaptation of Metal Gear Solid 2: Sons of Liberty written by Alex Garner and illustrated by Ashley Wood; Originally published as a 12-issue series.
Metal Gear Solid: NA: May 27, 2008; – Novel	Notes: A novel based on Metal Gear Solid written by Raymond Benson
Metal Gear Solid: Guns of the Patriots: JP: June 12, 2008; NA: June 19, 2012; – Novel	Notes: A novel based on Metal Gear Solid 4: Guns of the Patriots written by Project Itoh; An English adaptation was later released, translated by Nathan Collins.
Metal Gear Solid: Sons of Liberty: NA: November 2009; – Novel	Notes: A novel based on Metal Gear Solid 2: Sons of Liberty written by Raymond Benson
Metal Gear Solid: Snake Eater: JP: January 25, 2014; – Novel	Notes: A novel based on Metal Gear Solid 3: Snake Eater written by Satoshi Hase.
Metal Gear Solid: Peace Walker: JP: March 25, 2014; – Novel	Notes: A novelization of Metal Gear Solid: Peace Walker.; The first in a series of Metal Gear Solid novels written by Kenji Yano under the "Hitori Nojima" pen name.; A special edition was included in the Japanese Premium Package edition of Metal Gear Solid: Ground Zeroes featuring exclusive artwork.
Metal Gear Solid Substance I: JP: August 25, 2015; – Novel	Notes: An alternate novelization of the original Metal Gear Solid.; The second in a series of Metal Gear Solid novels written by Kenji Yano under the "Hitori Nojima" pen name.
Metal Gear Solid Substance II: JP: September 24, 2015; – Novel	Notes: An alternate novelization of Metal Gear Solid 2: Sons of Liberty.; The third in a series of Metal Gear Solid novels written by Kenji Yano under the "Hitori Nojima" pen name.
Metal Gear Solid: The Phantom Pain: JP: October 24, 2015; – Novel	Notes: A novelization of Metal Gear Solid V: The Phantom Pain.; The fourth in a series of Metal Gear Solid novels written by Kenji Yano under the "Hitori Nojima" pen name.

=== Audio dramas ===
Game	Details
Drama CD Metal Gear Solid: JP: December 4, 1998 Vol. 1; JP: January 8, 1999 Vol. 2; – CD-DA	Notes: A non-canonical radio drama sequel to the original Metal Gear Solid directed by Shuyo Murata and written by military advisor Motosada Mori, which depicts the further missions of Solid Snake (voiced by Akio Ohtsuka), Meryl Silverburgh (voiced by Kyoko Terase), Mei Ling (voiced by Houko Kuwashima) and Roy Campbell (voiced by Takeshi Aono) following the events of Shadow Moses.; Originally broadcast as segments in the Konami-sponsored CLUB db radio show from October 24, 1998 to January 9, 1999. It was later collected into a two volume CD series.
Idea Spy 2.5: JP: February 14, 2007; – CD-DA	Notes: A web audio drama based on an Easter egg featured in Metal Gear: Ghost Babel; originally written by Shuyo Murata and broadcast online on Hidechan Radio.
Metal Gear Solid: Peace Walker - Blues of Peace and Kazuhira: JP: September 22, 2010; – CD-DA	Notes: Features a five-part audio drama written by Hideo Kojima titled "Encounter", which depicts the first meeting between Snake (voiced by Akio Ohtsuka) and Kazuhira Miller (voiced by Tomokazu Sugita); Other content include cover renditions of "Showa Blues" and "Minato no Yoko Yokohama Yokosuka" performed by Ohtsuka and Sugita respectively, five additional drama episodes, and music tracks not included in the Peace Walker soundtrack album.; The "Encounter" portion of the album is included in the Japanese version of Metal Gear Solid: Ground Zeroes with the option to listen to them with English subtitles.

=== Music albums ===
Title	Release date	Length	Label	Source
Metal Gear 2: Solid Snake Original Soundtrack	April 5, 1991	1:00:05	King Records	
Metal Gear / Metal Gear 2: Solid Snake Music Collection	September 3, 1998	50:59	Konami Computer Entertainment Japan	
Metal Gear Solid Original Game Soundtrack	September 23, 1998	1:19:51	King Records	
Metal Gear >> Solid Snake: Music Compilation of Hideo Kojima/Red Disc	December 23, 1998	43:40	King Records	
Metal Gear Solid 2: Sons of Liberty Original Soundtrack	November 29, 2001	45:49	Konami Music Entertainment	
Metal Gear Solid 2: Sons of Liberty Soundtrack 2: The Other Side	January 26, 2002	57:35	Konami Music Entertainment	
Metal Gear Solid 2: Substance Original Soundtrack Ultimate Sorter Edition	December 19, 2002	54:13	Konami Computer Entertainment Japan	
Metal Gear Solid 2: Substance Limited Soundtrack Ultimate Sorter Edition	December 19, 2002	32:40	Konami Computer Entertainment Japan	
Metal Gear Solid 3: Snake Eater – Abstracted Camouflage	May 13, 2004	6:34	Konami Computer Entertainment Japan	
Metal Gear Solid 3: Snake Eater – The First Bite	November 1, 2004	23:14	Konami	
Metal Gear Solid 3: Snake Eater – "Snake Eater" Song from Metal Gear Solid 3	November 17, 2004	18:04	Konami	
Metal Gear Solid 3: Snake Eater Original Soundtrack	December 15, 2004	2:21:39	Konami Media Entertainment	
Metal Gear Ac!d & Ac!d² Original Soundtrack	December 21, 2005	2:04:54	Konami Multi-Media	
Metal Gear Solid: Portable Ops Original Soundtrack	December 12, 2006	1:13:15	Konami	
Metal Gear 20th Anniversary: Metal Gear Music Collection	July 18, 2007	1:04:53	Konami Digital Entertainment	
Metal Gear Solid 4: Guns of the Patriots Original Soundtrack	May 28, 2008	2:19:38	Konami Digital Entertainment	
Metal Gear Solid 4: Guns of the Patriots Limited Edition Soundtrack	June 12, 2008	1:01:22	Konami Digital Entertainment	
Heavens Divide/Koi no Yokushiryoku	April 7, 2010	33:52	Konami Digital Entertainment	
Metal Gear Solid: Peace Walker Original Soundtrack	April 14, 2010	1:12:10	Konami Digital Entertainment	
Metal Gear Solid: Peace Walker Vocal Tracks + Unreleased Instrumentals	November 10, 2011	41:18	Konami Digital Entertainment	
Metal Gear Solid: The Original Trilogy Vocal Tracks	November 23, 2011	43:40	Konami Digital Entertainment	
Metal Gear 25th Anniversary: Metal Gear Music Collection	August 22, 2012	1:09:36	Konami Digital Entertainment	
Metal Gear Rising: Revengeance - Vocal Tracks	February 20, 2013	1:11:16	Konami Digital Entertainment	
Metal Gear Rising: Revengeance Original Soundtrack	February 21, 2013	1:08:01	Konami Digital Entertainment	
Metal Gear Solid V Original Soundtrack	September 2, 2015	2:41:37	Konami Digital Entertainment	
Metal Gear Solid Vocal Tracks	September 2, 2015	1:00:13	Konami Digital Entertainment	
Metal Gear Solid V Extended Soundtrack	December 23, 2015	5:44:41	Konami Digital Entertainment	
Metal Gear Solid V Original Soundtrack: The Lost Tapes	March 30, 2016	49:22	Konami Digital Entertainment	
