= Never Dead =

Never Dead may refer to:

- NeverDead, a 2012 video game
- Never Dead, the working title of the 1979 film Phantasm
- "Never Dead", a song by Megadeth form Th1rt3en
