= Old Snake =

Old Snake may refer to:

- Old Snake (G.I. Joe), an alias of Cobra Commander from the G.I. Joe franchise
- Solid Snake, the protagonist of Konami's Metal Gear Solid 4: Guns of the Patriots

== See also ==
- Ancient serpent, a name of Satan in the Book of Revelation
