= Shinta Nojiri =

Japanese video game designer at Konami (born 1971)

Shinta Nojiri (野尻 真太 Nojiri Shinta, born April 8, 1971) is a Japanese video game designer at Konami. Born in Tokyo, he worked for Konami since 1995, and has directed various games in Metal Gear series and NeverDead.

== Selected works ==
- Policenauts (1994–1996) - assistant director
- Metal Gear: Ghost Babel (2000) - event planner/game director
- Metal Gear Solid 2: Sons of Liberty (2001) - scripting/level designer
- Metal Gear Solid 3: Snake Eater (2004) - scripting
- Metal Gear Acid (2004) - game designer/planner/game director
- Metal Gear Acid 2 (2005) - game designer/planner/game director
- Metal Gear Solid 4: Guns of the Patriots (2008) - Act 3 game design/scripting
- NeverDead (2012, PlayStation 3, Xbox 360) - game designer/director/producer
