= Metal Gear Solid 4: Guns of the Patriots =

2008 video game

- North American cover art
- Developer: Kojima Productions
- Publisher: Konami
- Director: Hideo Kojima
- Producers: Hideo Kojima; Kenichiro Imaizumi; Kazuki Muraoka; Yoshikazu Matsuhana
- Designer: Hideo Kojima
- Programmer: Yuji Korekado
- Artist: Yoji Shinkawa
- Writers: Hideo Kojima; Shuyo Murata
- Composers: Harry Gregson-Williams; Nobuko Toda; Shuichi Kobori; Kazuma Jinnouchi
- Series: Metal Gear
- Platform: PlayStation 3
- Release: June 12, 2008
- Genres: Action-adventure, stealth
- Mode: Single-player

Metal Gear Solid 4: Guns of the Patriots (Note: Japanese: メタルギア ソリッド 4 ガンズ・オブ・ザ・パトリオット, Hepburn: Metaru Gia Soriddo Fō: Ganzu Obu Za Patoriotto) is a 2008 action-adventure stealth game developed by Kojima Productions and published by Konami for the PlayStation 3. Directed, written, and designed by series creator Hideo Kojima, it is the sixth mainline Metal Gear game and a narrative sequel to Metal Gear Solid 2: Sons of Liberty (2001). (Note: The previous numbered title, Metal Gear Solid 3: Snake Eater (2004), was a prequel set three decades prior to the events of the original Metal Gear.) Set five years after the events of Sons of Liberty, the story centers around a rapidly aging Solid Snake, now known as Old Snake, as he goes on one last mission to assassinate Liquid Ocelot, the body of Revolver Ocelot inhabited by Liquid Snake, before he takes control of the Sons of the Patriots, an A.I. system that controls the activities of PMCs worldwide.

Guns of the Patriots received universal acclaim, with praise for its gameplay, graphics, characters, and emotional weight, while criticism centered on its plot as convoluted and its emphasis on cutscenes. The game garnered Game of the Year awards from several major gaming publications. Considered one of the greatest games of all time, (Note: Per:) it is also one of the most significant titles for the seventh generation of video game consoles, as its release caused a boost in sales of the PlayStation 3, and had sold six million copies worldwide by 2014. The next mainline game, Metal Gear Solid: Peace Walker, was released in 2010, and a spin-off game set four years after Guns of the Patriots, Metal Gear Rising: Revengeance, was released in 2013. In August 2026, the game was released for Nintendo Switch, Nintendo Switch 2, PlayStation 5, Windows and Xbox Series X/S as part of the Metal Gear Solid: Master Collection Vol. 2.

== Gameplay ==
Solid Snake shooting a militiaman

In Guns of the Patriots, players assume the role of an aged Solid Snake (colloquially referred to as Old Snake), using stealth, close-quarters combat, and traditional Metal Gear combat. The overhead third-person view camera of earlier games has been replaced by a streamlined view and over-the-shoulder camera for aiming a weapon, with an optional first-person view like a first-person shooter at the toggle of a button.

A further addition to gameplay mechanics is the Psyche Meter. Psyche is decreased by non-lethal attacks and is influenced by battlefield psychology. Stressors (including extreme temperatures, foul smells, and being hunted by the enemy) increase Snake's stress gauge, eventually depleting his Psyche. Adverse effects include difficulty in aiming, more frequent back pain and the possibility of Snake passing out upon receiving damage. If Snake kills too many enemies in a short amount of time, he will have a vision of Liquid and vomit, greatly reducing his Psyche. Among the available methods of restoring Psyche are eating, drinking, smoking, and reading an adult magazine.

Snake has a few gadgets to aid him in battle. The OctoCamo suit mimics the appearance and texture of any surface in a similar fashion to an octopus, decreasing the probability of Snake being noticed. Additionally, FaceCamo is made available to players after they defeat Laughing Octopus. FaceCamo can be worn by Solid Snake on his face and it can be set to either work in tandem with the Octocamo or instead mimic the face of other in-game characters. To get access to these unique FaceCamos, players have to complete certain in-game requirements first. When the FaceCamo is worn with OctoCamo, under ideal conditions, Snake's stealth quotient can reach 100%. The Solid Eye device highlights items and enemies and can operate in a night vision and a binocular mode. It also offers a baseline map, which indicates the location of nearby units. The latter function is also performed by the Threat Ring, a visualization of Snake's senses that deforms based on nearby unit proximity and relays them to the player.

Metal Gear Mk.II (later replaced with Mk.III), is a small support robot that always tags along with Snake, offers codec functionality and a means to the in-game menu for a large part of Snake's mission. It can be remotely controlled to stun enemies, provide reconnaissance and interact with the environment. Its design is based on the namesake robot from Snatcher, a game designed by Hideo Kojima. It is also controlled during the beginning of each separate "Act", although the player is not able to utilize its capabilities during this time.

Whenever the Drebin menu is available, weapons, attachments, and ammunition can be purchased via Drebin Points (DPs), awarded for on-site procurement of weapons already in the inventory and by initiating specific scripted events or destroying Unmanned Vehicles. The conversion rate between weapons and DPs depends on current battlefield conditions, with more-intense fighting yielding higher prices. Drebin would also purchase items from the player at a discounted price, especially at certain points in the story and certain days in real life. The game may also be finished without killing anyone, using non-lethal weapons.

The Virtual Range, similar to the Virtual Reality training of previous titles, functions as a test facility for weapon performance and gameplay controls.

== Synopsis ==
=== Setting ===
Guns of the Patriots is set within an alternate history timeline in which the Cold War continued into the 1990s, ending before the turn of the century. The events themselves take place in 2014, and form the final chapter in the storyline covering the character of Solid Snake, providing conclusions to the events that led up to Guns of the Patriots.

The world's economy relies on continuous civil wars fought by private military companies (PMCs), which outnumber government military forces. Soldiers are equipped with nanomachines that monitor and enhance their performance on the battlefield, controlled by a vast network known as the Sons of the Patriots (SOP) system. Liquid Ocelot re-emerges from hiding to launch an insurrection against the Patriots, a secret cabal that manipulates global affairs from the shadows.

In the meantime, Solid Snake is experiencing accelerated aging and has little time left to live. He is living on board the airplane Nomad with Dr. Hal Emmerich, nicknamed Otacon, and Olga Gurlukovich's daughter, Sunny, a child prodigy in computer programming. Since the aftermath of the Big Shell incident, Raiden has drifted away from Rose, who had apparently suffered a miscarriage with their child and gone to live with Snake's former commander, Colonel Roy Campbell, and has become a cyborg ninja fighting against the Patriots. Meryl Silverburgh commands a PMC inspection unit in the U.S. military, which includes Johnny Sasaki.

=== Plot ===
Five years after the Big Shell Incident (Note: As depicted in Metal Gear Solid 2: Sons of Liberty), Snake is told by Otacon that he has only a year to live due to Werner syndrome-like symptoms. Snake meets Campbell, now working with the United Nations Security Council, who tells him that Revolver Ocelot, missing since the Big Shell Incident, possessed by the will of Liquid Snake (Note: As depicted in Metal Gear Solid 2: Sons of Liberty), now under the guise of 'Liquid Ocelot', was located in the Middle East, and Snake is tasked to assassinate him. In a Middle-Eastern war zone occupied by one of Liquid's PMCs, Snake meets Drebin, an arms dealer who injects him with nanomachines to use the latest weaponry, and Meryl, now leader of Rat Patrol Team 01 who keeps a resentment against Campbell for being her biological father as well as his marriage to the much-younger Rose (Note: As revealed in one of the endings of Metal Gear Solid). Snake reaches Liquid, but the latter transmits a signal that incapacitates those nearby with nanomachines. He spots Dr. Naomi Hunter, who assists him against the signal and then departs with Liquid.

After waking up a day later in the Nomad, Snake and Otacon receive a video from Naomi, who reveals that she is in South America, kept as prisoner by Liquid to do research. In Colombia, Snake locates Naomi who explains that his accelerated aging is due to intentional genetic mutations as a human clone of Big Boss, and that the FOXDIE virus she infected him with (Note: As depicted in Metal Gear Solid) will also mutate within months, spreading to the general populace and causing a deadly pandemic. In addition, Naomi also discovers that the nanomachine injection Snake received from Drebin also contained a new strain of FOXDIE. After this, she explains that Liquid plans to use the biometrics of Big Boss to access and take command of the Patriots' firearms control system. Liquid's PMC soldiers kidnap Naomi, but Snake rescues her, assisted by Drebin and Raiden, and they escape, though Raiden is injured by Vamp.

Snake finds an Eastern European resistance group in Prague led by Big Mama (revealed as EVA, Snake and Liquid's surrogate mother). EVA reveals that after Operation Snake Eater (Note: As depicted in Metal Gear Solid 3: Snake Eater), Major Zero used the Philosophers' Legacy to form the Patriots—composed of Zero, EVA, Ocelot, Sigint, Para-Medic, and Big Boss—to fulfill The Boss’s will. Zero used Big Boss as an icon but, as Big Boss resented this, Zero initiated the Les Enfants Terrible project with Para-Medic and EVA to clone replacements (Snake and Liquid). Big Boss left to oppose Zero, forming Outer Heaven, starting a secret war over The Boss's will. Big Boss failed to stage a coup with FOXHOUND, defeated by Snake in Outer Heaven (Note: As depicted in Metal Gear) and Zanzibar Land (Note: as depicted in Metal Gear 2: Solid Snake). Zero then put him in a coma and secured the Patriots' control via the AIs: GW, TJ, AL, TR, and JD. She reveals to Snake that she is in possession of Big Boss's body, which they move by boat while Liquid's PMC soldiers attack decoys.

Liquid captures the body and obtains the biometrics, intending to infiltrate the Patriots' system by using the repaired artificial intelligence (AI) core, GW, as a trojan. U.S. soldiers arrive to arrest Liquid, but he eliminates them after disabling their firearms. Big Boss's body is incinerated, and Snake saves EVA from the fire when she tries to save it, but both are badly injured in the process. Naomi leaves with Liquid, but Otacon tracks them. EVA seemingly dies from her injuries.

Snake and Otacon learn that Liquid aims to destroy the Patriots' master AI with a nuclear strike, allowing GW to take control. A non-ID-tagged warhead is required from Metal Gear REX at Shadow Moses in Alaska. There, Snake is ambushed by Vamp, accompanied by Naomi, but he is killed when his self-healing nanomachines are disabled via injection and Raiden mortally wounds him in a duel. Naomi reveals that she has terminal cancer and, overcome with guilt for her mistakes, disables the nanomachines keeping her alive and dies. Snake and Raiden use REX to escape and fend off Liquid piloting a Metal Gear RAY. Liquid reveals Outer Haven, a modified Arsenal Gear. Raiden saves Snake from being crushed before the USS Missouri, captained by Mei Ling, arrives and forces Haven to retreat.

Snake, Meryl, and Johnny board Haven when it surfaces in order to launch the nuke. At the core, Snake installs a computer virus coded by Naomi and Sunny into Liquid's trojan, which destroys both the core AI as well as the entire Patriot network controlling global affairs, leaving the necessities for civilization to survive. Atop Haven, Liquid explains to Snake that he allowed the virus's installation in order to destroy the Patriots. The two fight, with Snake victorious and Liquid becoming Ocelot again before dying. Meryl reconciles with Campbell and marries Johnny. Raiden reunites with Rose after learning that their son, John, was not miscarried and her marriage to Campbell was a ruse to protect them from the Patriots. Snake visits the grave of The Boss at Arlington National Cemetery and, feeling that he has no further purpose and must prevent an epidemic from his FOXDIE, attempts suicide, but hesitates at the last moment.

Snake is then met by Big Boss with a vegetative Zero, with Big Boss explaining that the body burned in Europe was Solidus Snake. He then reveals that the Patriots were founded to realize the will of the Boss, his mentor. Differing interpretations split the group into two factions: Zero's, which stood for government control of society to prevent conflict; and Big Boss's, where soldiers fought for personal beliefs, unrestrained by governments. Zero consigned control to AI networks, the Patriots. After Big Boss's downfall in Zanzibar Land, the Patriots placed him in an induced coma, and later initiated the war economy, a vision far from the Boss's will. Ocelot and EVA planned to restore Big Boss by destroying the Patriots, with the possession of Ocelot through Liquid being a ruse to draw their attention. Big Boss then kills Zero by cutting off his life support.

He informs Snake that the new FOXDIE Snake received from Drebin was engineered by the Patriots to kill EVA, Ocelot, and himself. With the new strain supplanting the mutated strain, Snake poses no risk of becoming a biological weapon unless he lives long enough for it to mutate. After understanding his mentor's will and telling Snake to find a new reason to keep living, Big Boss dies beside the Boss's grave. Snake decides to live the time he has left peacefully with Otacon and Sunny.

== Development ==
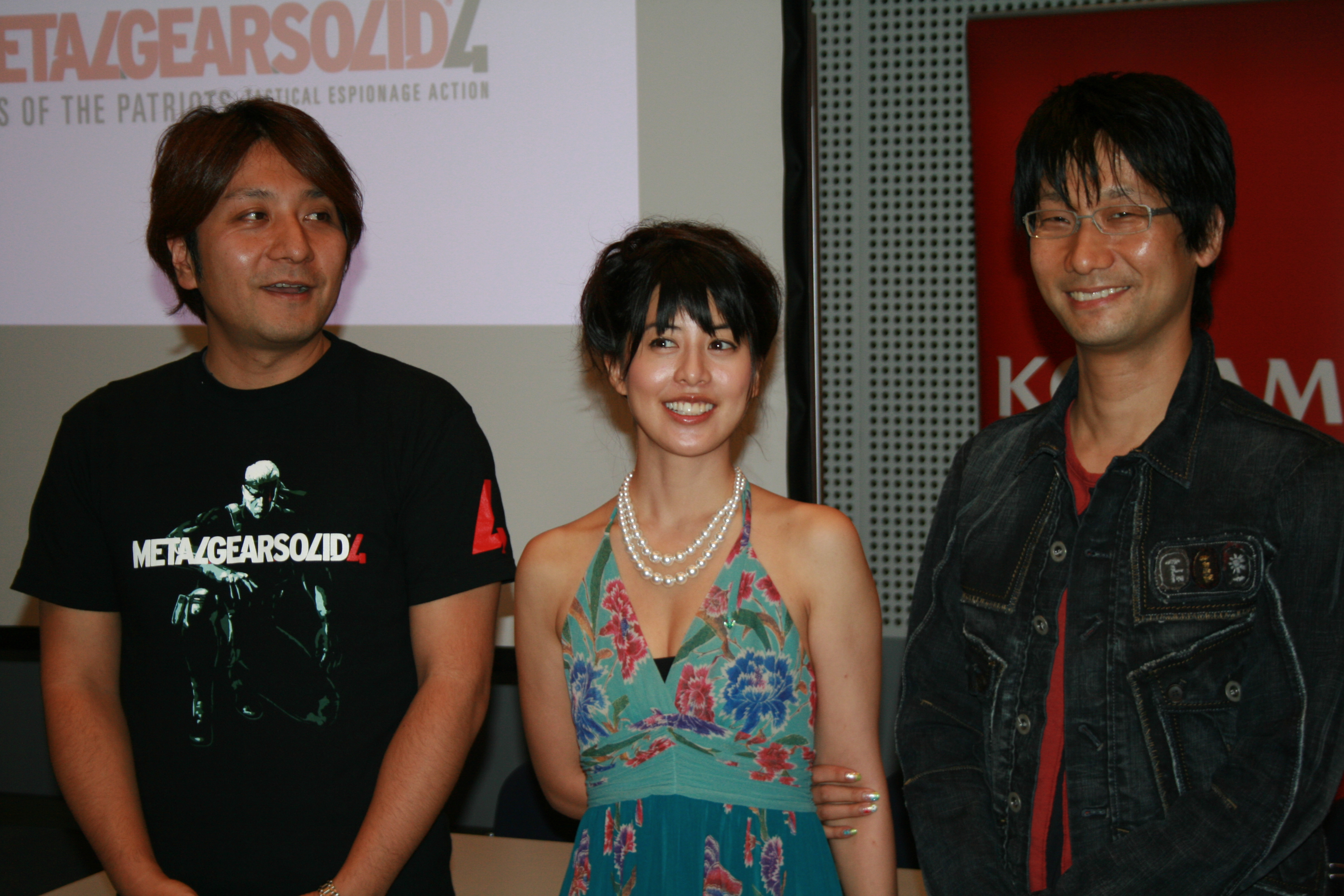
From the left to right: Kenichiro Imaizumi (producer), Yumi Kikuchi (Raging Raven character of The Beauty and the Beast Unit, voice, and motion capture actress), Hideo Kojima (producer, director, and writer) at the Games Convention 2007.

Metal Gear Solid 4 started development due to fan demand. Series creator Hideo Kojima had previously directed the prequel Metal Gear Solid 3: Snake Eater, which was meant to end the series. People's demand to have a sequel to Metal Gear Solid 2: Sons of Liberty and clear the mysteries Kojima wanted to leave to the players' interpretations resulted in the making of Metal Gear Solid 4. Kojima announced that he would be retiring as director of the Metal Gear series after Snake Eater, and would leave his position open to another person for Metal Gear Solid 4. As a joke, the new director was announced as Alan Smithee; in R, a 400-page book bundled with Metal Gear Solid 3's Japanese Premium Package, the director was revealed to be Shuyo Murata, co-writer of Snake Eater and director of Zone of the Enders: The 2nd Runner. He also contributed easter eggs to Sons of Liberty and Metal Gear: Ghost Babel. It was announced that Kojima would be co-directing the game with Murata after substantial negative fan reaction, including death threats.

Kojima wished to implement a new style of gameplay which was set in a full-scale war zone. Kojima wanted to also retain the stealth elements from previous entries in the series, which made the team abandon the original "No Place to Hide" concept. The only announced war zone before release was the Middle East. Using several locations emphasized Kojima's original intention to present the world in full-scale armed conflict. Solid Snake was physically aged to portray to the player the games' overarching theme, SENSE, and to assign them to a character whose task was to pass moral values to future generations. Kojima's initial ending for the Guns of the Patriots would entail Snake and Otacon turning themselves in for breaking the law, and subsequently convicted and executed. This was avoided after negative feedback from the development team. Snake's experience across the series made the creation of new enemies challenging and encouraged staff to create groups of non-human enemies to rival Snake.

During development, the game's exclusivity was continuously questioned, even after Kojima officially confirmed the exclusivity several times. The exclusivity of the game was still in doubt from non-PlayStation 3 owners for a long period after the initial release, with the company confirming that the 25th Anniversary edition of the game released in late 2012 was still a PlayStation 3 exclusive. Upon the release of Metal Gear Solid: The Legacy Collection, Kojima had once again firmly denied chances of the game's release on any other console, stating that an "Xbox 360 version [will not be] released, because an Xbox 360 version of MGS4 hasn't gone on sale" and that "the amount of data in MGS4 is just too enormous". The Xbox 360 is only capable of using DVD for games, which limits their size to 8.5 GB, though some games used multiple discs. MGS4 uses a 50 GB dual layer Blu-Ray disc while the digital version is 30 GB, making compressing the data onto a DVD very difficult without losing fidelity or using multiple discs.

The game was publicly announced first at E3 2005, by means of a humorous and slightly abstract gag machinima using characters from Snake Eater, under the slogan of "No Place to Hide". The title was described as "essentially finished" by January 2008 and went through extensive beta testing. At Destination PlayStation on February 26, 2008, Sony announced that the game would be released worldwide on June 12, 2008, along with the special Guns of the Patriots-themed PlayStation 3 bundle.

The budget for the game has been estimated to be between US$ 50-70 million. Kenichiro Imaizumi from Kojima Productions denied this stating if it had cost this much, the game would have been for multiple platforms. One of the main objectives of the budget was research of environments the game would feature.

=== Music ===
Harry Gregson-Williams
"Old Snake"
30-second sample from the opening theme of Metal Gear Solid 4: Guns of the Patriots, composed by Harry Gregson-Williams.

The score to Metal Gear Solid 4 was led by Harry Gregson-Williams, his third Metal Gear Solid soundtrack, and Nobuko Toda, who provided music for Metal Gear Acid and Metal Gear Acid 2. Other contributors are Konami employees Shuichi Kobori, Kazuma Jinnouchi, Akihiro Honda, and Sota Fujimori. Directed by Norihiko Hibino, GEM Impact employees Yoshitaka Suzuki and Takahiro Izutani also made compositions late in the game's production. It was revealed in an interview with Norihiko Hibino that the team, in fact, wrote 90 minutes of music for the game's cutscenes, only 15 minutes of which made its way onto the official soundtrack.

There are two vocal themes for the game. The opening theme, "Love Theme", is sung by Jackie Presti and composed by Nobuko Toda. The ending theme, "Here's to You", is sung by Lisbeth Scott. Before the release of the game, "MGS4 – Theme of Love – Smash Bros. Brawl Version" was provided for Super Smash Bros. Brawl in the Shadow Moses Island level. The "Metal Gear Solid Main Theme", composed by Tappi "Tappy" Iwase, was notably omitted from the soundtrack, and the soundtrack of Metal Gear Solid: Portable Ops. In an interview with Electronic Gaming Monthly, Norihiko Hibino stated that the company had difficulties with "Russian composers who said we stole their music", referring to an occasion when a group of Russian games journalists presented Hideo Kojima with a composition by Georgy Sviridov and claimed this had been plagiarised to create the theme. Hibino states that "they didn't actually" but the company was "too sensitive about the situation" and elected to drop the theme.

The official soundtrack was released on May 28, 2008, by Konami Digital Entertainment under the catalog number GFCA-98/9. It consists of two discs of music and 47 tracks. A soundtrack album was also packaged with Metal Gear Solid 4: Guns of the Patriots Limited Edition.

=== Trophy support ===
In August 2009, when asked if there would be a patch to add PlayStation Network Trophies to the game, Kojima Productions' Sean Eyestone asked people to "stay patient". This led to speculation that an updated version of the game in the vein of Substance or Subsistence would be released alongside a Trophy patch. In November 2010, an updated Greatest Hits box art of the game was released, which in the top right-hand corner boasted the addition of Trophies to the game. This was later reported as a typo, and removed from later printings. False reports of an "incoming Trophy Patch" often appeared, usually on internet forums and on April Fools' Day, some even going to the extent of a mock-up Trophy listing. In July 2012, a patch was announced that would include Trophies for the game, which would later be released on August 6, 2012. In addition to the support for Trophies, the patch also allowed a full install of the game onto the hard drive to remove the installs between acts.

== Marketing ==
At a press conference on May 13, 2008, Hideo Kojima announced a marketing campaign and agreements with several companies to promote the game. Apple computers and monitors feature in the game and an Apple iPod is an in-game item that Snake can use to change the background music, listen to in-game podcasts and collect hidden songs scattered throughout the game. ReGain Energy Drinks are used in the game as a Psyche gauge booster, and mobile phones from Sony Ericsson are used, specifically by Naomi and Vamp. In addition, the motorcycles featured in the game are a Triumph Bonneville and Speed Triple. Konami and Ubisoft put an unlockable costume in the game for Snake, Altaïr from the Ubisoft stealth game Assassin's Creed. Initially revealed on April Fool's Day 2008, Kojima later announced that it would actually be in the game, unlockable by doing "something special". To obtain the attire, the player must acquire the Assassin Emblema nod to the game's title—or input a password in the Extras section).

Konami had originally planned to organize grand launch events in Tokyo, but some of them were canceled with the "safety of participants in mind" in light of the Akihabara massacre on June 8, 2008. On June 15, 2009, a year after its release, Konami re-released Guns of the Patriots as a part of Sony Greatest Hits collection.

== Release ==
Metal Gear Solid 4 includes the Starter Pack for Metal Gear Online 2 (MGO2). MGO2 features up to 16 player online tactical battles and incorporates several gameplay elements from Metal Gear Solid 4, including the SOP system that allows players to have a visual confirmation of their teammates' position and battle status. MGO2 also allows fully customizable characters. The Starter Pack allows players to engage in sneaking missions, where Old Snake and Metal Gear Mk.II acquire dog tags from other human contestants, along with standard Deathmatch, Team Deathmatch, and several special modes. Expansions packs, offering more maps and playable special characters (Mei Ling, Meryl, Akiba, Liquid Ocelot, Raiden, and Vamp), can be purchased via the MGO2 menu item "MGO Shop (PlayStation Network)", or via MGO2 or Konami's shop. The PlayStation Wallet is used for the first option and a credit card for the latter two. Metal Gear Online 2 was completely shut down on June 13, 2012.

On June 19, 2008, Konami released the Metal Gear Solid 4 Database onto the PlayStation Store in North America and Japan, and one week later on the European store. The Database is a downloadable application for PlayStation 3 that catalogs every piece of Metal Gear lore from all the canonical entries in the series released up to Metal Gear Solid 4 in the form of an encyclopedia (browsable by alphabet and category), a timeline, and character relationship diagrams. Highlighted words in each article link to related articles, and it keeps track of which ones the user has already read. The Database automatically locks any items related to the game, in order to prevent the leaking of spoilers to players who have not completed the game yet. In order to reveal these articles, the user must have a completed Guns of the Patriots game save that was created on the same console and with a version of the game from the same region as their account.

=== Editions and bundles ===
A Limited Edition was released simultaneously with the game's standard edition, as an enhanced counterpart. The limited edition contains Guns of the Patriots, a box with artwork by Yoji Shinkawa, a Blu-ray Disc containing two "making of" documentaries, and partial game soundtrack containing only songs written by Harry Gregson-Williams. The Limited Edition was available exclusively at GameStop in the United States and EB Games in Canada, while a similar bundle with an additional 6-inch 'Olive Drab' Old Snake Figurine was made available at Play.com in the United Kingdom. It is also included in the 40GB Limited Edition PlayStation 3 Metal Gear Solid 4 bundle.

In North America, a bundle containing an 80GB PlayStation 3, a DualShock 3 wireless controller, a downloadable game coupon for Pain, and a copy of Metal Gear Solid 4: Guns of the Patriots was released for US$499 on June 12, 2008, to coincide with the release of the standalone edition. Japan saw the release of the Guns of the Patriots Welcome Box that contains the game itself, a DualShock 3 controller, a Sixaxis controller, and a 40GB PlayStation 3 in either black, white, or silver.

Sony also announced a limited edition pre-order bundle containing Guns of the Patriots Limited Edition and a matte grey (officially titled Gunmetal Grey) 40GB PlayStation 3. First announced in Japan on March 18, 2008, at a cost of JPY¥51,800, the bundle sold out by March 25, 2008. An identical bundle was available in North America for pre-order on May 19, 2008, in "very limited" supply for US$600 at Konami's official website. David Reeves has announced a similar bundle for Europe which includes a 40GB PlayStation 3, the game itself and a DualShock 3 controller but it failed to release in Europe, leaving only the piano black 80GB and 40GB bundles.

A downloadable version of the game was released on PlayStation Store at the end of 2014. It was also briefly available as a PlayStation Now rental title in North America, before being delisted by Konami due to undisclosed reasons. It was added again to the service in March 2019.

=== Downloadable content ===
The game received new content through PlayStation Network (in-game downloads) between 2008 and 2009. A total of 49 free add-ons have been released, which include 12 additional OctoCamo patterns, 12 MGS4 Integral podcasts (the Japanese version got 18 Guns of the HIDECHAN!Radio podcasts instead), and 25 iPod songs (a twenty-sixth song, named "Chair Race" was removed for copyright reasons in 2011). On July 16, 2014, it was announced on the Japanese site that all DLC downloads would terminate on July 31; however, a workaround was made in January 2015. As of today, this is the only way to obtain the content on an unmodified console, as it was never made available on PlayStation Store.

== Related media ==
Metal Gear Solid Touch for iOS is a "touch shooting" game that revisits Guns of the Patriots's plot and action through the touch interface. Developers of the game LittleBigPlanet, Media Molecule, released an expansion pack based on Guns of the Patriots on December 23, 2008. It includes character skins for Old Snake, Raiden, Meryl, and Screaming Mantis, as well as a Metal Gear-themed set of levels.

In October 2011, Konami and Hasbro produced a special Guns of the Patriots-themed version of Risk, which had playing pieces based on the game's various characters, plus a battle map based on Outer Haven. The game's characters can also be used as special allies. A novelization of Guns of the Patriots written by Project Itoh was published by Kadokawa Shoten in Japan on the day of the game's release. An English-language translation of the novel was published in North America in June 2012.

== Reception ==
=== Critical reception ===
Reception

Aggregate score
Aggregator	Score
Metacritic	94/100

Review scores
Publication	Score
Computer and Video Games	9.5/10
Edge	8/10
Eurogamer	8/10
Famitsu	10/10, 10/10, 10/10, 10/10
Game Informer	10/10
GamePro	5/5
GamesMaster	97%
GameSpot	10/10
GameTrailers	9.3/10
IGN	(US) 10/10 (UK) 9.9/10 (AU) 9.5/10
PlayStation Official Magazine – UK	10/10
PSM3	9.5/10
X-Play	5/5

Award
Publication	Award
PlayStation Official Magazine – UK	8th best PS3 game of all time

Metal Gear Solid 4 received universal acclaim, according to review aggregator website Metacritic. The first review was a 10/10 from PlayStation Official Magazine – UK, commenting "MGS4 shifts gears constantly, innovating again and again". The game has been awarded 10/10 from Game Informer, as well as a perfect score in all categories (graphics, control, sound, and fun factor) from GamePro, Famitsu (40/40), and Empire. The game received a 9.9/10 from IGN United Kingdom, a 9.5/10 from IGN Australia, and a 10/10 from IGN USA. IGN was quoted in a video review, saying it is "one of the best games ever made". Edge and Eurogamer both gave the game 8/10. GameSpot gave it a 10/10, saying "Metal Gear Solid 4: Guns of the Patriots is the most technically stunning video game ever made", making Guns of Patriots one of only five games ever to receive a perfect 10 from both IGN and GameSpot, and the sixth of only nine games to receive a perfect ten from GameSpot overall. IGN also included the game at No. 59 in its list of Top 100 Games of a Generation.

Reviewers acclaimed the manner in which the title concludes the series. Eurogamer stated: "You could not ask for a funnier, cleverer, more ambitious or inspired or over-the-top conclusion", and IGN found that the result "refines the MGS formula and introduces just enough new (or respectfully influenced) ideas to ensure that it stands on its own as a game". Edge concluded that "it is faithful to its fans, its premise and its heart, delivering an experience that is, in so many ways, without equal", while IGN UK described it simply as "the ultimate Metal Gear game" and "a dazzling, heart-lifting, voyage of discovery". The game was also described as being unusually sad and depressing for a video game. Kotaku said "Metal Gear Solid 4 is so unusual in that it's the rare game that asks them to be interested in something else: a march toward defeat, an interactive tragedy."

The new control scheme ("the ideal balance of intuitiveness and range"), camouflage system, and shift to more free-form, replayable gameplay, in particular the Drebin Points system and alternatives to stealthy play, were particularly highly praised with a few minor annoyances. The variety of set-piece events, details such as the psyche meter, and healthy provision of secrets were also remarked upon. Eurogamer tempered their overall praise with concern that one of the chapters may induce ennui but that the game quickly recovered, while Edge expressed mild disappointment that the Beauty and the Beast Unit compare poorly to the previous title's main foes, the Cobra Unit.

The game was lauded for its technological and artistic achievements, with Edge describing the Otacon character as "the real star", and "a gaming revolution", while they found the game's score to be superior to that of many Hollywood offerings. The magazine felt that the few visual shortfalls, such as texture detail, did nothing to detract from the game's overall quality. IGN UK commented that the attention to detail in both visuals and audio represented "sublime brilliance", and remarked upon innovations such as the extensive use of split-screen during some cutscenes.

Criticism of the game was largely leveled at the storyline, which reviewers found at times to be confusing, or poorly executed, and with IGN UK advising players to revisit the earlier titles for clarity. The overall result was praised as emotionally engaging and topical, and characters such as Liquid Ocelot were singled out for the quality of their depiction. It was generally conceded that although the use of cutscenes were more intrusive than they needed to be, comprising "about half of the content of the game" by one estimate, and which "might make you crave action, or wonder why they couldn't have been turned into interactive sequences", the style was somewhat appropriate given the rest of the series ("in many ways it's a vindication of Kojima's unique interpretation of the videogame medium"), and unlikely to trouble fans. The addition of a pause function for these story sequences was universally welcomed.

Edge and Eurogamer concluded that although the game represents an apotheosis of the series style, it ultimately fails to revitalize it, and would not win over new fans. IGN UK was concerned that the game's hype and widespread praise may lead to disappointment but felt that the game was a "masterpiece".

=== Review restrictions ===
Several publications have commented on limitations given to pre-release reviewers by Konami, including discussion on the length of cutscenes and size of the PlayStation 3 installation. These limitations resulted in Electronic Gaming Monthly delaying its review. In lieu of a review, the magazine printed a roundtable discussion about the game. Kojima Productions spokesperson Ryan Payton has since explained more specifically what the NDA restricts, and has amended "some items [that] are outdated and require more explanation." He also listed the length of install times, noting that the restrictions were intended to prevent spoilers regarding what occurs during the installations.

Following this statement, gaming site GameSpot published a blog entry in which it claims it will be unable to review the game either, claiming Konami have withheld review code because of non-compliance with the limitations. The article originally implied that the absence of a review was due to GameSpot's refusal to attend the Boot Camp event at Kojima Productions' offices. It has since revised it to state that the Boot Camp was a mid-development feedback and PR exercise, and would not have led to a review in any case.

The day before Konami's restrictions were to be lifted, Electronic Gaming Monthly (EGM) reviewer Jeremy Parish clarified the reasons for the self-imposed review embargo, dispelling rumors of a disagreement between Konami and EGM on the review conditions in a lengthy blog commentary. His review of the game appeared on the website shortly after.

=== Sales ===
According to Konami, the game shipped over 3 million units worldwide on the day of its release. According to Enterbrain, Guns of the Patriots sold 476,334 copies in its first four days on sale in Japan, which includes copies bundled with the PlayStation 3, and caused a boost in PlayStation 3 sales. The PlayStation 3, which at the time sold about 10,000 units in a given week, went on to sell 77,208 units in the game's debut week. It was the 11th best-selling game of Japan in 2008, selling 686,254 copies. According to Chart-Track, the game is the second fastest-selling PlayStation 3 title in the United Kingdom after Grand Theft Auto IV and was below Metal Gear Solid 2: Sons of Liberty's opening weekend figure by 14,000 copies recorded in 2002; the sales of the PlayStation 3 increased by a "minimal" seven percent over the opening weekend. Konami has reported that Guns of the Patriots sold over one million copies across Europe in its first week, with 25,000 limited-edition copies "snapped up almost immediately".

The game received a Platinum sales award from the Entertainment and Leisure Software Publishers Association, indicating sales of at least 300,000 copies in the United Kingdom. In the United States, it was the best-selling game in June 2008 selling 774,600 copies (nearly one million if the number of copies bundled with the PlayStation 3 console was included), causing console sales to double over the previous month according to the NPD Group. It became one of the best-selling PlayStation 3 video games, and was the best-selling PlayStation 3 exclusive until the release of Gran Turismo 5. As a result, Guns of the Patriots is one of the Platinum/Greatest Hits range of best-selling games, and helped to increase sales for the Metal Gear franchise and record profits for Konami in 2008–2010. On May 21, 2014, Ryan Payton, a former employee of Kojima Productions who worked on Metal Gear Solid 4, stated that the game has sold 6 million copies.

=== Awards ===
Following the critical acclaim it received upon its release, Guns of the Patriots won many Game of the Year awards from many international outlets, these including GameSpot, Gamezine, and PALGN, along with a significant number of Readers' Choice awards, and awards directed towards its story-telling, graphical, and voice-acting aspects. GameSpot praised the game significantly, and awarded it "Game of the Year", "Best PS3 Game", "Best Graphics (Technical)", "Best Boss Battles", "Best Story", "Best Voice Acting", "Most Memorable Moment", and "Best Action/Adventure Game". IGN awarded the game "Best PS3 Game of 2008", "Best Graphics Technology", "Best Original Score", and "Best Action Game". PALGN awarded it "Game of the Year", "PS3 Game of the Year", and "Best Visuals". PC World heralded it with "Game of the Year". Playfire awarded it "Game of the Year", "Best Action/Adventure Game", and "Best Graphics". It also won "Game of the Year" from the Portuguese Eurogamer. On NeoGAF, it was awarded "Game of the Year". The German site 4PLAYER.de gave it "Game of the Year". GamePro awarded it "Best PS3 Game of 2008" and "Best Action/Adventure Game". 1UP.com gave it "Game of the Year", "Best PS3 Game", "Best Action Game", and "Best Audiovisual Experience". Fox News Channel awarded the game "Best PS3 Game of 2008" and "Best Game of 2008". GameSpy awarded it "Best PS3 Action Game". From Gamezine, it won "Game of the Year" and "Best PS3 Game". Giant Bomb gave it "Best PS3-Only Game", "Best Graphics", and "Most Satisfying Sequel". In the Golden Joystick 2008 awards, it was awarded "Best PS3 Game". At Tokyo Game Show 2009, it received the Grand Award (alongside Mario Kart Wii) and the Award of Excellence. The readers of PlayStation Official Magazine – UK voted it the 5th best PlayStation title released.

At the 12th Annual Interactive Achievement Awards, the Academy of Interactive Arts & Sciences awarded Guns of the Patriots with "Outstanding Achievement in Original Music Composition", along with receiving nominations for "Overall Game of the Year", "Console Game of the Year", and outstanding achievement in "Animation", "Character Performance" (Old Snake), "Game Direction", and "Visual Engineering".
