= Metal Gear Solid Touch =

2009 video game

- Developer: Kojima Productions
- Publisher: Konami
- Director: Ikuya Nakamura
- Producer: Kenichiro Imaizumi
- Artist: Tsutomu Hashiguchi
- Composer: Shuichi Kobori
- Series: Metal Gear
- Platform: iOS
- Release: WW: March 18, 2009; JP: March 19, 2009
- Genre: Third-person shooter
- Mode: Single-player

Metal Gear Solid Touch (Japanese: メタルギアソリッド タッチ, Hepburn: Metaru Gia Soriddo Tatchi) is a third-person shooter video game for iOS developed by Kojima Productions and published by Konami worldwide. Announced on December 16, 2008, Metal Gear Solid Touch is based on Metal Gear Solid 4: Guns of the Patriots. It was released on the App Store for select regions on March 18, 2009.

== Gameplay ==
Old Snake in action

The player navigates through several missions based on stages from Metal Gear Solid 4, each introduced by brief text summarizing the story so far. The player moves their finger across the screen to aim, tapping to fire, and moving their fingers together or apart to zoom in or out with a sniper rifle, removing their fingers from the screen to get behind cover and avoid enemy fire. The main character's primary weapons, an assault rifle and a sniper rifle, can be rotated with one another by pinching the device's screen.

The player plays as Solid Snake, who is also known as Old Snake in Metal Gear Solid 4. The entirety of Metal Gear Solid 4 has been streamlined into a portable and more accessible form. The main objective of most missions is to kill a set number of enemies. Enemies include hostile PMC soldiers, Haven Troopers and Gekkos, which are unmanned fighting machinations. There are also friendly targets which the player is penalised for shooting at. Some sections contain 'Boss fights', where the player fights a boss from the Metal Gear Solid 4 storyline; e.g. Laughing Octopus. At the end of each mission, the player is awarded a rank based on their precision and speed in completing the mission. Higher ranks award more Drebin Points, which can be used to buy rewards such as iPhone character wallpapers.
