= Solid Snake =

Fictional character from the Metal Gear series

- Metal Gear character
- Solid Snake in promotional content for Metal Gear Solid: The Legacy Collection (2010) (Note: Showcasing an updated rendition of his appearance in Metal Gear Solid (1998))
- First appearance: Metal Gear (1987)
- Created by: Hideo Kojima
- Designed by: Yoji Shinkawa (Metal Gear Solid series); Ikuya Nakamura (Metal Gear: Ghost Babel); Tsubasa Masao (Metal Gear Acid series)
- Voiced by: JP: Akio Ōtsuka; EN: David Hayter (Note: Peter Lurie voiced Solid Snake in Ape Escape 3.)
- Motion capture: Mizuho Yoshida (Metal Gear Solid 2, The Twin Snakes); Ryoji Okamoto (Metal Gear Solid 4); Ian MacDougall (facial capture, Metal Gear Solid 4)

In-universe information
- Full name: David
- Affiliation: FOXHOUND
- Nationality: American
- Mentor: Big Boss

Solid Snake (Note: Japanese: ソリッド・スネーク, Hepburn: Soriddo Sunēku), real name David, is a character and one of the protagonists of Konami's Metal Gear series, created by Hideo Kojima. He is depicted as a former Green Beret and highly skilled special operations soldier engaged in solo stealth and espionage missions who is often tasked with destroying models of the bipedal nuclear weapon-armed mecha known as Metal Gear. The first two games explored his relationship with his mentor Big Boss whereas Metal Gear Solid onwards reveal he is one of three clones of the same man, which starts a rivalry that lasts until Metal Gear Solid 4: Guns of the Patriots where the genes caused Snake to age rapidly into an elder. He also appears in Nintendo's Super Smash Bros. series as a playable fighter, as well as the battle royale game Fortnite, and has been added to the game Tom Clancy's Rainbow Six Siege.

Snake was named by Kojima who aimed to create a strong individual who would rival villains with a similar naming convention. While his first appearances in the original Metal Gear games were references to Hollywood films, the Metal Gear Solid series has given him a consistent design by artist Yoji Shinkawa while also following Clint Eastwood and Lee Van Cleef as inspirations for his design. During the Metal Gear Solid games, the character has been voiced by voice actor Akio Ōtsuka in the Japanese version and by Canadian-American screenwriter and actor David Hayter in the English version.

Considered one of the most iconic protagonists in video game history, Solid Snake has been acclaimed by critics, with his personality and both Ōtsuka's and Hayter's voice acting being noted as primary factors of the character's appeal. The character has also been praised for his rivalry with the other characters featured in the series, most notably Liquid Snake and Revolver Ocelot while his growth into an elder was also the subject of positive response.

== Appearances ==
=== Video games ===
==== Metal Gear and Metal Gear 2: Solid Snake ====
Metal Gear introduces Snake, a rookie recruit of the elite special forces unit FOXHOUND. Snake is sent by Big Boss into Outer Heaven, a rogue nation in South Africa, to rescue Gray Fox and discover who or what the "Metal Gear" is. As his mission progresses, Snake finds out that he has been set up; Big Boss's phantom intended to use TX-55 Metal Gear (the experimental, nuclear-armed weapon) to establish Outer Heaven as a nuclear power. After destroying the Metal Gear, Snake confronts and defeats Big Boss's phantom.

The sequel Metal Gear 2: Solid Snake follows Solid Snake's infiltration mission into Zanzibar Land, a heavily fortified enemy base in Central Asia that has aggravated an international oil crisis and declared itself a nuclear power by kidnapping Dr. Kio Marv, creator of a bio-engineered algae that produces an oil substitute, and the Metal Gear engineer Pettrovich Madnar. Snake infiltrates the base and discovers that Pettrovich as well as Fox has defected to Zanzibar Land, and that Zanzibar Land is led by the true Big Boss. Snake destroys Metal Gear D and defeats both Fox and the true Big Boss.

==== Metal Gear Solid / The Twin Snakes ====
Metal Gear Solid and its remake The Twin Snakes reveal Solid Snake's real name as David (デビッド, Debiddo). He is pulled out of retirement by Roy Campbell to deal with the "Sons of Big Boss" led by Liquid Snake who seized an isolated American nuclear weapons disposal facility on Shadow Moses Island. Snake's mission is to rescue Donald Anderson and Kenneth Baker, but ultimately he is unable to prevent both hostages' deaths. As the game progresses, Snake learns about Metal Gear REX while meeting up with rookie soldier Meryl Silverburgh and REX's engineer Hal Emmerich, and confronts and defeats each member of the corrupt faction of FOXHOUND (consisting of Revolver Ocelot, Decoy Octopus, Psycho Mantis, Sniper Wolf, Vulcan Raven, and the Genome Soldiers). He destroys REX and confronts Liquid. During their fight, it is revealed that Solid and Liquid are twin brothers artificially conceived from Big Boss's genes as part of the "Les Enfants Terribles" government project designed to create the perfect soldier, in which one brother was genetically modified to be superior to the other. Liquid harbors a strong resentment towards Snake since Solid was apparently given their father's dominant "soldier genes" and Liquid was seemingly cast aside. After a grueling series of battles, Liquid dies from the FOXDIE virus that was previously implanted into Snake by Naomi Hunter in order to wipe out FOXHOUND without risking any damage to REX during retrieval. In the end, it is revealed that Liquid got Big Boss's superior "soldier genes" while Solid was actually the inferior one.

==== Metal Gear Solid 2: Sons of Liberty ====
A Sons of Liberty Snake cosplayer hiding in a cardboard box.

During an extensive prologue of Metal Gear Solid 2: Sons of Liberty, Solid Snake as a player character is sent by Otacon's anti-proliferation organization Philanthropy to infiltrate a cargo tanker and photograph Metal Gear RAY. During the operation, however, RAY is hijacked and the tanker destroyed, with Snake apparently dead and framed for the deed. During the main plot portion, Solidus Snake steals Snake's identity, and leads the "Sons of Liberty" (consisting of Revolver Ocelot, Fortune, Fatman, Vamp and Olga Gurlukovich) while Snake himself uses pseudonym Iroquois Pliskin (イロコィ・プリスキン, Irokoi Purisukin) as a non-playable character who assists a player character Raiden. The navigate through the remote offshore Big Shell facility and take down Solidus and RAY while also learning about the Patriots.

==== Metal Gear Solid 4: Guns of the Patriots ====
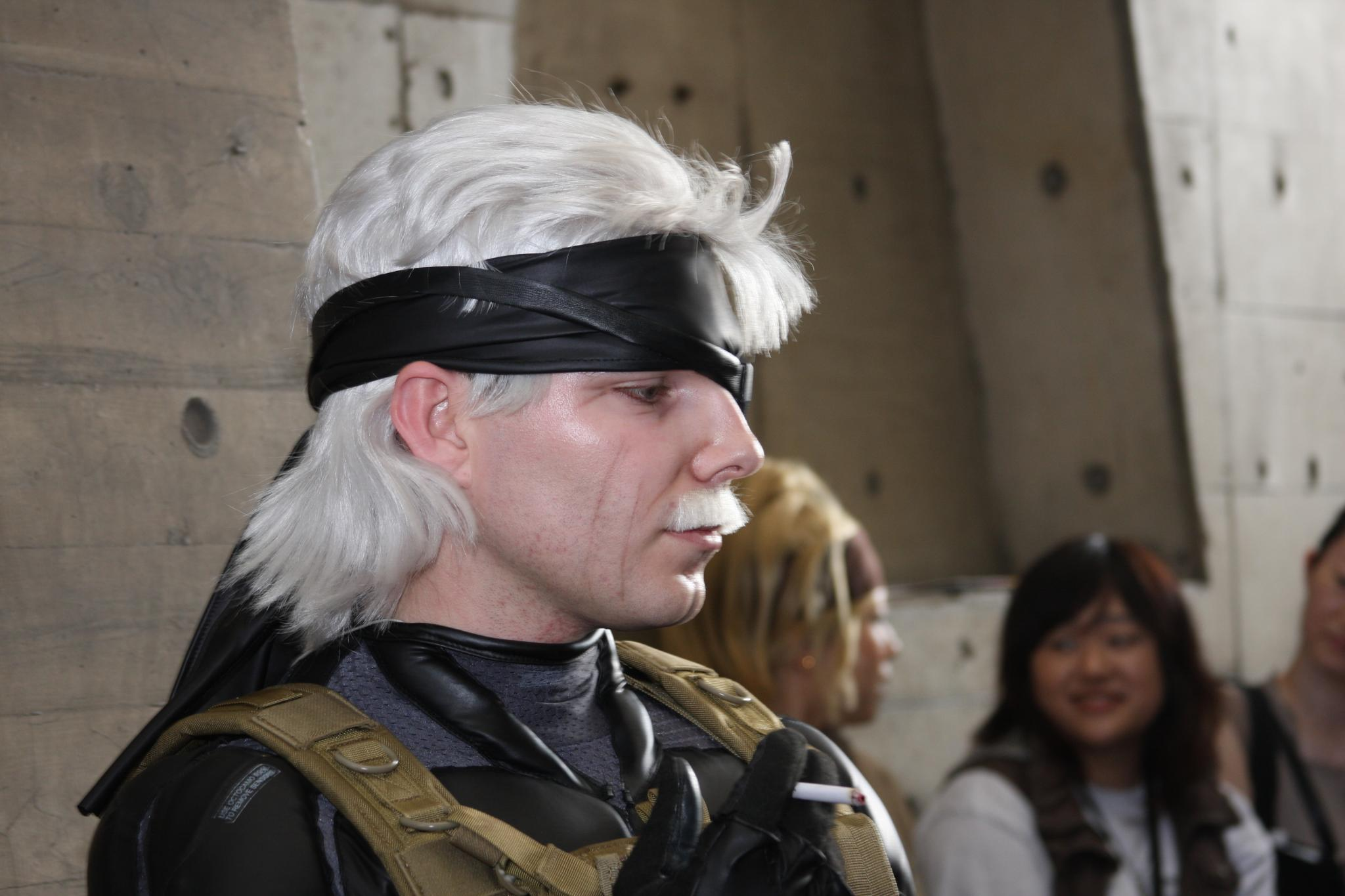
Old Snake cosplayer at Tokyo Game Show 2010

Metal Gear Solid 4: Guns of the Patriots features an aged Solid Snake as the protagonist who nicknamed himself Old Snake (オールド・スネーク, Ōrudo Sunēku). Thanks to Otacon and Sunny, he wears a sneaking suit outfitted with "Octocamo" technology which allows him to blend with his environment as well as a face mask which alters his appearance.

For his final mission, he is enlisted by Campbell to assassinate Liquid Ocelot, CEO of a giant mother company that are trying to take control of the Patriots' AIs. He also learns from Naomi that his life has been artificially shortened as part of the cloning process so that his genes can't be used as a weapon in later research, thus explaining why he has the physical appearance of an elderly man despite being only forty-two years old. Snake and his allies are forced to destroy the Patriots' AI and fight through Ocelot's forces until Snake defeats Liquid's doppelgänger in hand-to-hand combat. Snake tries to commit suicide as his DNA contains a mutated FOXDIE virus that might trigger an epidemic, but Big Boss reveals a new variant overwrote the mutant version, and the two make up as father and son. David is told he still has a chance to live "not as a snake but as a man" so he decides to live out the remainder of his life in peace, vowing that he will live long enough to see what the future holds for the new world he has helped create.

=== Other appearances ===
The Metal Gear Solid prequels allude to Solid Snake's existence; Metal Gear Solid: Portable Ops has him briefly alluded to in a prophetic vision as Naked Snake's "son [who] will save the world" (after Liquid and/or Solidus as Big Boss's "son [who] will bring the world to ruin"), and Metal Gear Solid: Peace Walker shows Kazuhira Miller mentioning the "twin sons" that are two years old at the time.

Solid Snake is featured in Metal Gear Solid V: Ground Zeroes and Metal Gear Solid V: The Phantom Pain. The unlockable bonus mission "Déjà Vu" on the PlayStation platform and later Xbox platform of Ground Zeroes in which Naked Snake must re-enact situations from the original Metal Gear Solid game and answer a series of trivia questions after fulfilling the mission. If all the questions are answered correctly on the Normal difficulty setting, the mission can be replayed with his low-polygon model from Metal Gear Solid in place of his father's standard character model. The Phantom Pain also shows that his low-polygon model from Metal Gear Solid can be an alternate outfit for Venom Snake after transferring the save data from Ground Zeroes. David is also alluded to in association with Eli during a conversation between Big Boss and Revolver Ocelot.

=== Other Metal Gear media ===
Solid Snake also serves as the protagonist in Snake's Revenge, a sequel to the original Metal Gear for the NES released for the Western market in 1990 and developed without Kojima's involvement. Set three years after the Outer Heaven incident, Snake's Revenge has Snake leading a team of FOXHOUND operatives as they infiltrate an undisclosed enemy base where the Metal Gear weapon is being mass-produced. Snake is addressed by the military rank of Lieutenant and starts the game already equipped with a handgun and a combat knife, in contrast to the first game, where Snake had to procure all his weapons on-site.

After the success of the original Metal Gear Solid, KCEJ produced a trilogy of Metal Gear spin-offs for portable platforms set in a parallel universe outside the main Kojima-directed series. All three of these portable games were directed by Shinta Nojiri. The first of these is Metal Gear: Ghost Babel (released outside Japan as Metal Gear Solid), in which Solid Snake must infiltrate a rebuilt Outer Heaven (now called Galuade) to defeat a FOXHOUND-like team of rogue agents called Black Chamber and destroy a stolen Metal Gear prototype, Gander. Although the actual in-game artwork of Ghost Babel was done by Ikuya Nakamura, Yoji Shinkawa provided the promotional art as he did with the original Metal Gear Solid. In the second of these titles, Metal Gear Acid, Snake must retrieve "Pythagoras" from the Lobito Physics and Research Laboratory to satisfy hijackers who kidnapped presidential candidate Viggo Hach. This mission is complicated by La Clown, an expert mimic who impersonates Snake's contact Teliko, and subtle brainwashing that nearly convinces him he is Hans Davis, a ruthless scientist who worked at the Lobito facility. He overcomes both, contacts the real Teliko, then destroys the latest model of Metal Gear, Metal Gear KODOQUE. Metal Gear Acid 2 features a main character who is not the real version, but a clone created from tissue samples of the man from the original Metal Gear Acid, following the events of the Lobito Island mission; the Solid Snake from the original Acid is implied to be dead in the sequel.

The character appears in his Old Snake form as a playable character in Metal Gear Solid: Portable Ops Plus, a stand-alone expansion to the Portable Ops focusing on online play. In Metal Gear Rising: Revengeance, the VR Missions DLC add-on for the game's Japanese version includes a new weapon that can be used by Raiden known as the Hebidamashi, a talking wooden sword which speaks with Solid Snake's voice (as portrayed by Akio Ōtsuka); the weapon was never made available for the English version.

Outside video games, Solid Snake appeared in the Metal Gear Solid audio drama that focuses on his missions following the battle from Shadow Moses. He also appears in Alex Garner's comic book adaptations of Metal Gear Solid and Metal Gear Solid 2. Raymond Benson's novelizations of these two games also feature Solid Snake; Benson's adaptation of the character frequently focuses on the comical aspects of his characterization. He also appears in Project Itoh's novelization from Metal Gear Solid 4 where his actions are told from Hal Emmerich's point of view.

=== Other video games and media ===
In the Worlds of Power novelization series created by F.X. Nine, Solid Snake appears in the second in the series, based on Metal Gear. In the book, written by Alexander Frost, he is Marine Captain Justin Halley.

Solid Snake has appeared in a number of other games, including other Konami games. Hideo Kojima makes a habit of referencing his previous work. In the Kojima-produced Boktai 2: Solar Boy Django (and Shin Bokura no Taiyō: Gyakushū no Sabata), Snake appears as an unnamed character who sells items to the player. Konami's Evolution Skateboarding features Snake and Raiden as hidden characters, as well as two stages set in the Big Shell (the skateboarding minigame in Metal Gear Solid 2: Substance is a demo of Evolution Skateboarding composed exclusively of these elements). Solid Snake also appears in both halves of a crossover between the Metal Gear and Ape Escape franchises: the Ape Escape monkeys appear with Solid Snake in the "Snake vs. Monkey" minigame featured in Metal Gear Solid 3: Snake Eater. In turn, Snake appears in the corresponding Metal Gear Solid minigame featured in Ape Escape 3, where he is rescued by Pipo Snake.

Solid Snake appears in Tom Clancy's Rainbow Six Siege as a playable Operator, as part of its Year 11 Season 1 update; the character is incorporated into the lore of Siege, with his involvement taking place between the events of Metal Gear Solid and Metal Gear Solid 2.

He has also appeared in several cross-company fighting games. In DreamMix TV World Fighters, Solid Snake appears as a playable character alongside other characters such as Bomberman and Optimus Prime. Similarly, in Super Smash Bros. Brawl, the third installment from the popular fighting game series Super Smash Bros., Solid Snake appeared as a playable fighter alongside Sega character Sonic the Hedgehog. Brawl Director Masahiro Sakurai has stated that Snake was included under Kojima's request, and that he had talked to Sakurai about adding Snake to the roster of the previous game Super Smash Bros. Melee, which did not materialize due to the game being too far into production. Snake returned as a playable fighter in Super Smash Bros. Ultimate, after being absent in Super Smash Bros. for Nintendo 3DS and Wii U. In addition, Snake has appeared as a playable character in other Konami crossover titles, such as New International Track & Field and Super Bomberman R.

Old Snake has appeared in the Japanese version of Scribblenauts, having been published by Konami in that region. Customizations in Media Molecule's LittleBigPlanet for the PlayStation 3 allow the player character, Sackboy, to take on the appearance of Old Snake.

Solid Snake appears as an outfit in Fortnite as the "Bonus Outfit" of Chapter 5 Season 1's battle pass and was unlockable by completing in-game quests from January 23, 2024, through March 8, 2024, the end of that season.

== Creation ==
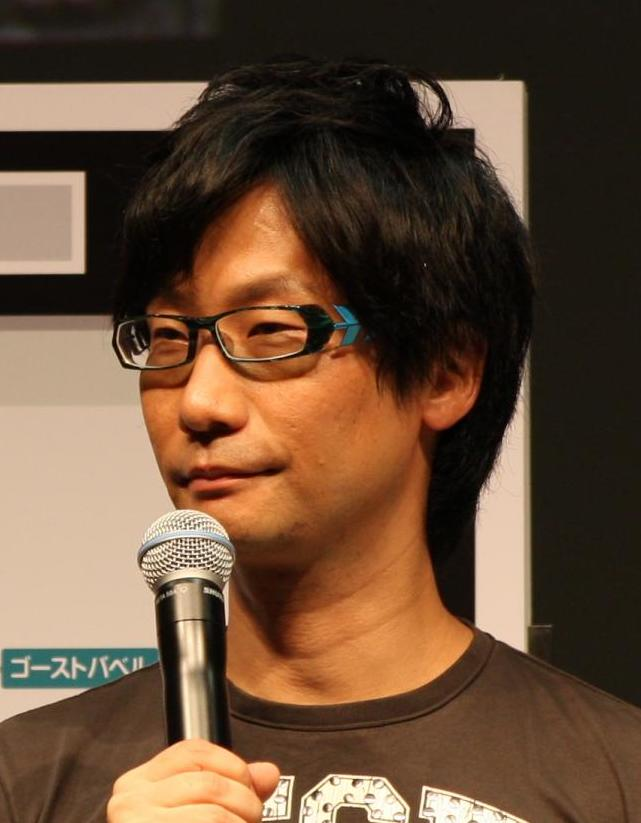
Hideo Kojima, creator of Solid Snake

Solid Snake was chiefly inspired by the fictional special forces operative Snake Plissken, Kurt Russell's character in Escape from New York. Series creator Hideo Kojima revealed in March 2014 that the character's codename reflects two opposite characteristics—his snake-like stealth and "strong and blade-sharp image" representing "lack of balance and equilibrium". His real name, David, is a tribute to the film 2001: A Space Odyssey character of the same name.

=== Characterization ===
Kojima has compared Snake's personality with Lupin III of Monkey Punch's Lupin III franchise, stating that in "MGS Snake became this sharp-tongued, Lupin III-like guy who flirted with women and told lots of jokes". Kojima later described Snake's initial role in the original Metal Gear as the "player's presence", acquiring defined personality in Metal Gear Solid. In addition to expanding Solid Snake's backstory, Metal Gear Solid became the first Metal Gear game to feature voice acting establishing his characteristic voice and appearance.

The decision to make a new character to replace Solid Snake for most of Metal Gear Solid 2: Sons of Liberty stemmed from the developer's desire to both show Snake from the perspective of the player character Raiden and to highlight Snake's experience by juxtaposing him with a rookie character. The idea for a second main character was inspired by some of the Sherlock Holmes works narrated by Dr. Watson rather than Holmes. However, Kojima said that while Raiden was the playable character, Snake was still the game's true protagonist. Yoshikazu Matsuhana, assistant director for the project, was uncertain about this decision; he considered Raiden a "weak-looking character" but decided to follow Kojima. Konami kept Raiden's starring role in Metal Gear Solid 2 secret until the game's North American release; the company replaced Raiden with Snake in teaser trailers and other preview materials. Although Raiden appeared in several preview trailers in his scuba gear, his presence was not emphasized. The surprise character-switch has been inspired by the plot twist of Terminator 2: Judgment Day where the titular villain from the first movie played by Arnold Schwarzenegger was not a villain in the second one.

Snake was written to act as a father figure not only to protect those he cares about but also to leave a pacifist message for the future generation. Snake and Otacon were meant to die in the game as a punishment for being criminals rather than heroes, which was influenced by similar themes from the movie Sacco & Vanzetti. While MGS2 novel retained this idea, the ending in the game was changed with Snake and Otacon surviving.

Various scenes with Solid Snake relate to Hideo Kojima's experience during the games' production. In Metal Gear Solid 2, Snake encourages Raiden to trust himself when making his own choices, a scene symbolizing Kojima, veteran developer, as Solid Snake and the younger staff as Raiden, who are to decide whether a sequel to the series would be made without him. In Metal Gear Solid 4, Snake tries to protect the next generation by stopping Revolver Ocelot which references Kojima working with the staff on the game bugs. Kojima introduced the cloning origins of Snake to Metal Gear Solid in order to provide Snake with an adversary who would be his equal. Following Kojima's departure from Konami, the company indicated that it does not intend to produce further Metal Gear games with Solid Snake as the protagonist; Kojima has stated that Solid Snake "is one character that I don't want to entrust to other people".

=== Design ===
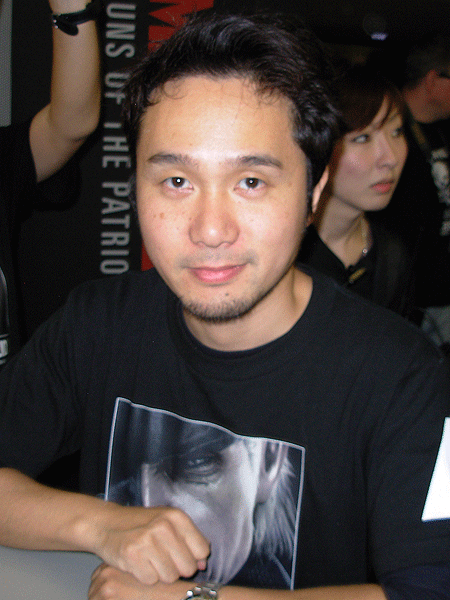
Yoji Shinkawa. designer of Snake since Metal Gear Solid

Much as Metal Gear began as a pastiche of action movies of the time, Solid Snake began as a pastiche of action movie heroes. On the cover artwork of the original Metal Gear he resembles actor Michael Biehn as Kyle Reese in the 1984 film The Terminator, although Kojima said to have no involvement in the production of the game's packaging illustration. In the in-game portrait of Metal Gear 2: Solid Snake, Snake resembles Mel Gibson.

Yoji Shinkawa's initial Solid Snake design, characterized by his navy blue bandanna and "sneaking suit", would serve as the template for all future incarnations of Metal Gear games. According to Shinkawa, Snake's physique in Metal Gear Solid was based on that of action star Jean-Claude Van Damme, while his facial appearance was inspired by actor Christopher Walken. Shinkawa described his rendition of Solid Snake from Metal Gear Solid as a "middle ground" between the younger Snake who was in the cover artwork of the first Metal Gear and the middle-aged Snake from the MSX2 version of Metal Gear 2. Snake's visual appearance was slightly modified for the initial events of the Big Shell chapter from Metal Gear Solid 2—his hair became more blonde and appearance somewhat resembles the Man with No Name (as portrayed by Clint Eastwood). Shinkawa commented that Snake was one of the easiest Metal Gear characters to draw, as his appearance is consistent across games with only minor changes. According to Kojima, Snake's character model was specifically designed to have well-sculpted buttocks, as the player spends the majority of the game staring at the character's back from a third-person view.

During the making of Metal Gear Solid 3: Snake Eater, Kojima asked Shinkawa to make Naked Snake similar to Solid Snake, but with the experience differences, thus Naked Snake acts more naively and rookie-like. According to Shinkawa, he had no difficulties with the design, drawing Naked Snake as basically a revised version of Solid Snake, and as a result, Naked Snake is virtually identical in appearance to Solid Snake in some of the Metal Gear Solid games. Since the game's trailers did not state that Naked Snake was Big Boss, Kojima often gave vague answers to the character's true identity.

By the time Metal Gear Solid 4 started development, Kojima told Shinkawa about his idea of making Snake look elderly, which surprised the designer. Once Shinkawa showed his artwork of Old Snake to the staff, they were all also surprised by the idea of playing as an old version of Snake. However, they were satisfied with the end product as the staff began to like the character. Old Snake is modelled after Lee Van Cleef who appeared in Escape from New York.

=== Voice actors ===
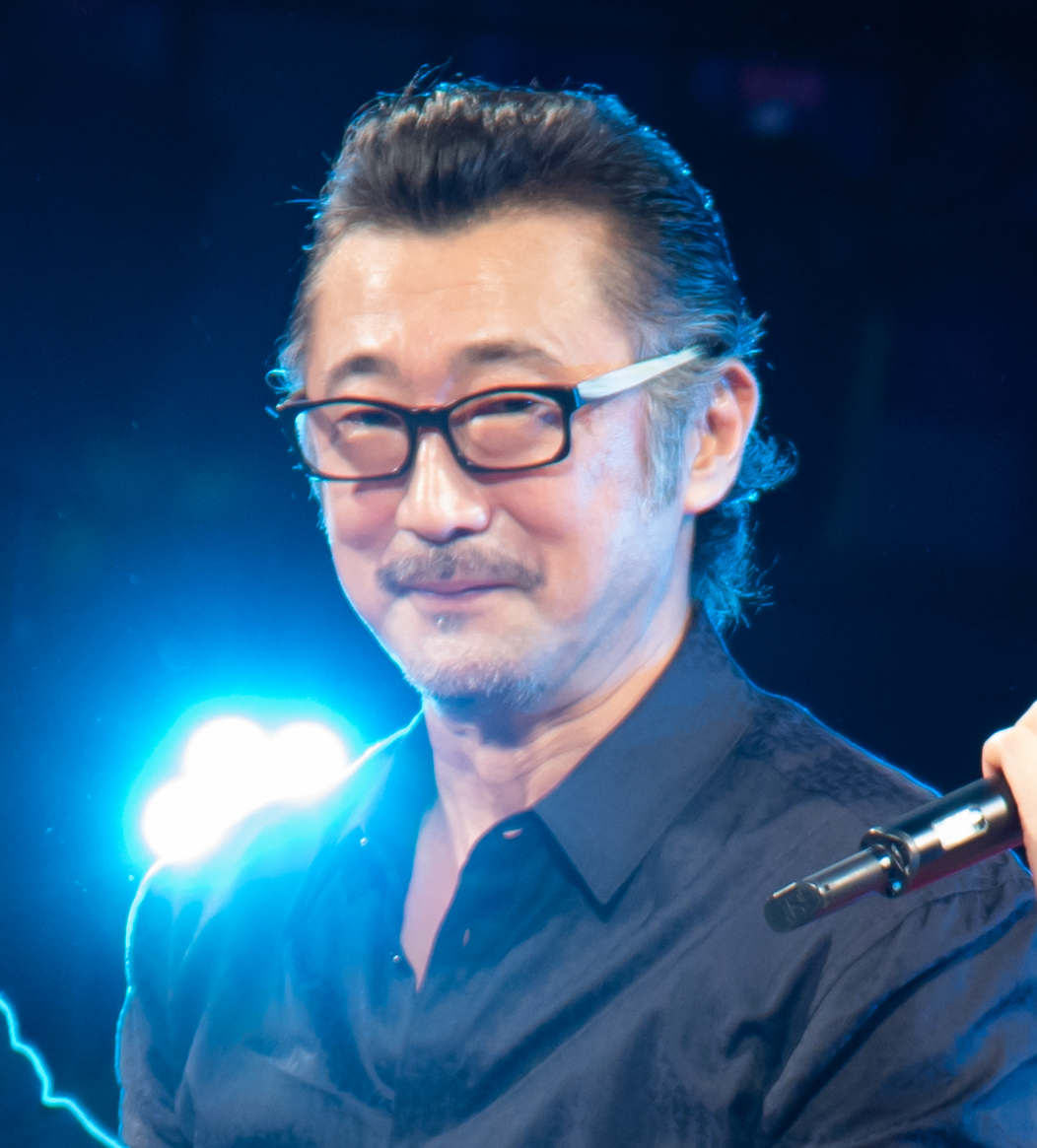
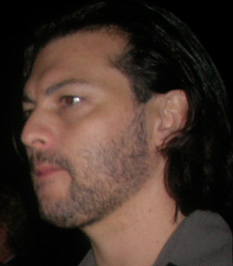
Solid Snake is voiced by Akio Ōtsuka (left) in Japanese and by David Hayter (right) in English.

Solid Snake has been voiced by Akio Ōtsuka in the Japanese version, and by David Hayter in the English adaptations. Ōtsuka remembers being surprised during his debut as a result of the large amount of dialogue Solid Snake was given. Otsuka remembers the early sessions well, where he learned of the catchphrase "Kept you waiting?" and found Snake to be the character he is attached to the most. Regarding issues between Kojima and Konami, Otsuka believes fans have attached the image of Snake to Kojima and will not voice him without Kojima. When it comes to the two Snakes he voiced, he finds Naked Snake from Snake Eater more relatable while describing Solid Snake as a clones who battles his genes in rivalry with Liquid Snake. Otsuka claims Solid Snake also has his own darkness that contrasts the original more human Naked Snake.

Hayter's performance was called one of the greatest in gaming and is one of the character's most recognizable traits. In 2013, when working in Captain Planet, Hayter met the show's casting director Kris Zimmerman, who would later also be the voice-over director for Metal Gear games. When debuting in Metal Gear Solid, Hayter was impressed by the game's cutscenes and the amount of dialogue. One of Snake's lines that Hayter liked was "I just didn't expect a world-class designer of military technology to be so… cute." Additionally, Hayter liked the scenes where Snake interacts with Mei Ling, believing it showed a more fun side of him. Solid Snake's English voice was inspired by Hayter's experience with Japanese storytelling, resulting in minor changes to the script. Although there were no news about Snake's future role in Metal Gear, the actor believes Guns of the Patriots gave the character a proper closure. One of Snake's final scenes in this game bothered Hayter, were Snake hesitates to kill himself despite previously killing multiple enemies..

== Reception ==
=== Popularity ===
Solid Snake was well-received by gaming media. Retro Gamer included him in the "top ten forces of good" section on their 2004 list of top 50 retro game heroes. Electronic Gaming Monthly listed him in 2005 as the number one among the top ten video game characters of all time. In an Oricon poll from 2008, he was voted as the most popular video game character in Japan, tying with Nintendo's Pikachu. In a Famitsu poll in 2010, Solid Snake was voted by readers as the most popular video game character. His character was amongst the last 16 contestants on the greatest video game hero on GameSpot contest held in 2009, and lost out to Gordon Freeman on a tiebreaker. In the Guinness World Records Gamer's Edition from 2011, Solid Snake was voted as the fourth most popular video game character. In 2011, Empire ranked Solid Snake as the 19th greatest video game character, adding that "beginning as an action pastiche, he swiftly evolved into his very own character". In 2021, Chris Morgan described Snake for Yardbarker as one of "the most memorable characters from old school Nintendo games". HobbyConsolas placed Snake at the third position in their "30 best heroes of the last 30 years".

=== Critical response ===
Critics often praise Solid Snake for his appealing personality. Rich Knight and Gus Turner from Complex acknowledged him as one of the best video game mascots, praising his "deep, human emotion that other characters fail to match." Among the several characters he encounters, critics noticed that Snake's friendship with Otacon was one of the best parts of his character due to the contrast it has with enemies as well as how he Snake comforts him in Sons of Liberty, while IGN remarked that his rivalry with Liquid Snake is massive and confusing. His rivalry with Big Boss was also popular according to Computerworld journalist, especially when they are compared as son and father and genetic heir. Various gaming sites such as 1UP.com, Game Informer and Kotaku joked on the poor relationship between the two of them as the father attempts to murder his own son. Among other character relationships, Snake and Gray Fox were popular due to the variety of enemies the player faces.

Solid Snake's Metal Gear Solid 2 design was poorly received by GamePro and IGN especially for its haircut. The book Playing with Videogames states that Raiden's inclusion was intended to surprise Metal Gear fans who, instead of playing as Snake, played as his opposite. Writer James Newman commented that fans' reactions were highly negative; they acted as though Kojima had betrayed their expectations. He compared Raiden to the controversial Star Wars character Jar Jar Binks. However, Eurogamer's Tom Bramwell found Raiden's interactions with the other characters helpful for building Solid Snake's character. As the game progresses it is stated that Raiden "has become Snake", having developed skills similar to those he gained from taking part in the Big Shell's fights that resemble Metal Gear Solid's Shadow Moses Island. Before Metal Gear Solid 3: Snake Eater, Solid Snake was thought to be the game's protagonist because of his physical resemblances with Naked Snake. However, later previews speculated how was it impossible for him to be in the game's settings, leading to the conclusion it was a young incarnation of his father. A comparison between Solid Snake's and Big Boss's characters was made by IGN in an article titled "Stars Thunderdome: Snake vs. Big Boss" seeing the two as differently trained and wonder whether or not one was superior to the other.

The character's appearance in Metal Gear Solid 4 has received mostly positive opinions. Before it was released, various speculations were made regarding his role. IGN commented that the most famous rumor was, as he was the only one who suffered from a drastic change in appearance, his body would be rapidly deteriorating and player would have limited time to finish the game. Moreover, since Konami had announced that it would be his last appearance, IGN and GamesRadar wondered whether the character would die during the game and if Raiden would replace him following his death. GamesRadar commented in 2008 that he was one of the few gaming characters that aged across video games. GamePro listed Old Snake as one of the biggest surprises from Metal Gear Solid 4 for being interesting in contrast to pessimistic thoughts they had before the game's release. GameDaily listed the "old hero" in the list of top video game archetypes, using the old version of the character as an example. PLAY gave praise to his moustache considering how highly detailed it is, and for representing the change from Solid Snake's character. On the other hand, 1UP.com criticized the aging for being too graceless and giving negative messages about aging. 1UP.com listed their fight as the 13 "most dumbass" boss battles for its simple style in comparison to other more challenging bosses from Metal Gear Solid 3 and its excessive length for a hand-to-hand fight between two old people. The design resulted in mixed reactions regarding whether or not the character kept his original sex appeal.

Solid Snake was also popular for his inclusion in Smash Bros. based on the impact of his inclusion, design, and his importance in gaming. Game Informer ranked Hayter's role as Solid Snake as the seventh most memorable character voice in video games for "a portrayal that's considered to be a real classic in the history of video game voice acting". In 2024, a poll conducted by BAFTA with around 4,000 respondents named Solid Snake as the fourteenth most iconic video-game character of all time.

=== Analysis ===
In "Hideo Kojima: Progressive Game Design from Metal Gear to Death Stranding", Solid Snake's first two games are seen as a "silent complex film" for their focus on visuals and little dialogue, with the manual further comparing the cast to real actors, and Snake being likened to Mel Gibson and his in-game graphics looking like Kurt Russell's Snake Plissken. While the first Metal Gear is regarded as a simple game, Metal Gear 2: Solid Snake embodies a more realistic take with a focus on the protagonist's movement when hiding from the enemies.

In "Analyzing Metal Gear Solid through Psychoanalytic Film Theory", Metal Gear Solid is highlighted for its immersive dialogues done through frequent interactions between Snake and other characters that might come across as ridiculous at first, but the seriousness of the exchanges makes it realistic. Snake is also notable for his masculine personality when interacting with Meryl and Hal, made for the male gaze. These interactions empower male players and help to further immerse them into the game. In his weaker moments, Snake is told by Naomi Hunter to treat himself by an action only the player can do, emphasizing the player's immersion. Once Upon a Pixel: Storytelling and Worldbuilding in Video Games described how the sequence was able to remind players of the fact that the world of Metal Gear Solid was in a video game, and that while they controlled Snake, they themselves would never amount to actually being Snake. This created conflicting feelings of identification and alienation, with Mantis's actions pushing the player out of the normal game flow they were experiencing as Snake.

While the decision to replace Snake with a more vulnerable hero, Raiden, bothered fans, critics found the experience integral to the narrative, emphasizing subversive logics of control and effect. Raiden's interactions with veteran Solid Snake identify the former as "a Metal Gear fan". As the game progresses, it is stated that Raiden "has become Snake", having developed skills similar to those he gained from taking part in the Big Shell's fights that resemble Metal Gear Solid's Shadow Moses Island. VG247 wrote that the game helps Raiden to better distinguish himself, and for the player to distance themselves from Snake's revered image by deconstructing him as an unreliable ally.

Guns of the Patriots places heavy emphasis on being Snake's final story, where he stands out thanks to his heroic persona regardless of his actions while exploring his sense of justice and morals when it comes to wars in futuristic settings. The character's expanded origins further make him a "hybrid" of worldly cultures. Although Snake is regarded as a hero, the protagonist never takes pride in his actions and instead sees himself as a killer for the missions he is given for the sake of a greater good. The theme of genes helps Snake differentiate himself from the Foxdie victims Liquid and Ocelot. Although Snake ultimately survives, the character is forced to commit suicide and is given a "rebirth" when Big Boss lectures him that he has a chance of living in the world he has been fighting for.

=== Controversy ===
In the Tekken 7 Evo 2019 finals, the character was used to have a chat with developer Katsuhiro Harada. The organizers of Evo stated this was a joke as many fans believed it was a hint for a possible usage of the character as downloadable content. David Hayter complained about this joke as Evo did not consult Konami or him when using the audio.
