= Metal Gear Acid 2 =

2005 video game

- Developer: Konami Corporation
- Publisher: Konami
- Director: Shinta Nojiri
- Producers: Hideo Kojima; Noriaki Okamura
- Designer: Shinta Nojiri
- Artist: Tsubasa Masao
- Writers: Shinta Nojiri; Tomokazu Fukushima; Shuyo Murata; Noriaki Okamura
- Composers: Akihiro Honda; Hiroshi Tanabe; Nobuko Toda
- Series: Metal Gear
- Platforms: PlayStation Portable; J2ME (mobile)
- Release: PlayStation Portable: JP: December 8, 2005; NA: March 21, 2006; EU: May 19, 2006; Mobile phone: EU: March 10, 2008
- Genres: Tactical role-playing, stealth, digital collectible card game
- Modes: Single-player, multiplayer

Metal Gear Acid 2 (Note: メタルギア アシッド2 (Japanese: Metaru Gia Ashiddo Tsū)) (stylized as Metal Gear Ac!d²) is a turn-based collectible card stealth game developed and published by Konami for the PlayStation Portable in 2005. A Java ME version for mobile phones was released by Glu Mobile in 2008 titled Metal Gear Acid 2 Mobile.

Acid 2 is the sequel to the original Metal Gear Acid, with the story set sometime after the events of the previous game. Like its predecessor, it follows an alternate continuity separate from the mainline Metal Gear series. The game uses a completely new cel-shaded graphic engine, replacing the darker graphics from the first game, and features an improved gameplay system. It comes with a PSP add-on called the Solid Eye, which is a folding cardboard box with specialized lenses that fit over the PSP's screen, creating a stereoscopic image.

== Gameplay ==
Gameplay in Metal Gear Acid 2 is similar to that of its predecessor, using a series of collectible trading cards based on the other Metal Gear games. There are new features, such as the SELL option for cards, allowing overstocked cards that the player cannot use to be sold for more points (in-game currency used to buy cards) and cover fire (when a player's ally is behind an enemy and has an equipped weapon in range of the target, when the player attacks, the ally takes a shot onto the target as well). Also added is the ability to move past doors instead of stopping when approaching, and characters can now pick up items such as weapons and card packs by simply running over them (instead of having to end movement on top of the item).

The game uses a revamped engine, featuring a cel-shaded presentation, 3D equipment boxes, and new particle effects. There is a tutorial mode for beginners and a new "Arena" single-player mode that allows players to battle boss characters from previous games, such as Liquid Snake and Vamp, using the Acid 2 card-battling system. There are also extra missions such as "Sneaking" and "Elimination" modes. The game can be also played in the "Wireless Battle" mode (using ad hoc connection only). An additional "Solid Eye Theater" mode allows users to watch videos of the Japanese women seen on posters and magazines throughout the Metal Gear series, utilizing the Solid Eye attachment.

=== Card system ===
The gameplay system consists primarily of the usage of cards (obtainable in-game, through a card shop, or other means such as codes or game completion). These cards have a variety of effects for the player, and most can double as a movement card (represented in the form of blocks, referenced as BLKS in-game). Activation conditions include USE (where they can be used immediately if all conditions are met), EQUIP (where cards take up an equipment slot), or MOVE (allowing the player to move). Most cards can move the player three BLKS, but some cards allow more (or less), and a number of cards are dedicated movement cards, most of which are based on soldiers from the previous Metal Gear games. COST is also an important factor, as it affects turn order and is represented in the form of a small counter. It can be summarized as the time taken for the player to perform an action, so if the player has a cost of 0 and an enemy has the cost of 1, the player will go first, regardless of the number of turns the player has had (unless a condition or card effect states otherwise). If the player (or enemy) builds their cost up to the amount that another character already has, that puts that card behind the character with the equal cost in the turn order. COST build up varies by card and is indicated in the upper-right corner of the card.

There are 565 cards, more than twice the number of the original game, including upgradeable cards. Cards vary drastically: some allow the player to attack (Weapon Cards), some provide support such as the ability to dodge an attack (Support Cards), giving the player the ability to perform an action such as the "hold-up" move that incapacitates enemies when the player threatens them from behind or to choke an enemy unconscious (Action Cards), to use items like rations or body armor (Item Cards), or special character cards with varying effects based on the characters they represent (either all from Metal Gear games or other Konami games) such as the Sniper Wolf card with gives the player 40% more accuracy on equipped weapon for one use (Character Cards). Some cards reduce cost or give an extra turns or action points (each card takes up one action point).

=== Solid Eye ===
Acid 2 ships with a viewing device called the Solid Eye. It is a folding cardboard box that slides over the PSP, separating the image with a divider in the center. The game is playable with or without the Solid Eye. When switched into Solid Eye mode, the game displays two images on either side of the PSP screen. When used with the Solid Eye, the images overlap and produce a pop-out, 3D effect. The game and manual warn that using this device for extended periods of time may lead to eyestrain, and prolonged use is not recommended. As more cards are collected, videos are unlocked in the Solid Eye Theater, available from the game's menu. These videos are only viewable as Solid Eye footage, and showcase videos of Japanese women as well as cut scenes from Metal Gear Solid 3: Snake Eater.

Acid 2 is capable of communicating with Metal Gear Solid 3: Subsistence for the PlayStation 2. By connecting a PS2 to a PSP, it is possible to take photos in Subsistence and transfer them to a PSP for viewing in 3D with the Solid Eye. The manual that is included with the American version of the game is significantly thinned down, and as such, does not contain a specific guide on how to utilize this feature. Instructions can be found in the downloadable manual.

== Plot ==
=== Story ===
The story begins with a man known as Snake, a young woman named Consuela Alvarez, and two pilots named Dave Copeland and Roddy Louiz, flying into the United States illegally when they are arrested by the FBI. After being caught, Snake is pressed into a mission by his captor, an FBI agent named Dalton. Snake agrees to the job to free his friends and clear his name with Dalton. Snake's initial objective is to infiltrate a research facility operated by SaintLogic (called "StrateLogic" in the Japanese version), a military arms manufacturer, located on an isolated North American island. Dalton is investigating SaintLogic for inhuman actions towards children, and utilizes Snake's abilities to infiltrate SaintLogic and uncover the truth behind their business practices.

Shortly into Snake's mission, Dalton's authority is exceeded by General Wiseman, an official with the United States Department of Defense. Snake slowly learns that Wiseman's involvement is in response to a SaintLogic executive Thomas Koppelthorn, who has made demands that the United States release several prisoners and has threatened to use nuclear weapons. Wiseman proceeds to offer Snake information regarding his past in return for Snake's assistance in eliminating the present SaintLogic threat. Snake teams with Venus, Wiseman's own operative, and together they search SaintLogic for Koppelthorn. Soon after, a test is initiated, and Snake becomes aware that SaintLogic has developed a Metal Gear which Koppelthorn has taken control of. It later becomes evident that Koppelthorn is seeking revenge for an incident that occurred three years before, and among his demands are that the United States release Snake to him. General Wiseman constantly comments on a Lucinda File, which he wants Venus to obtain. As Snake and Venus search SaintLogic's research facilities, they encounter a researcher, Dr. Takiyama, and a young girl, Lucy, who proceed to join Koppelthorn's scheme. Before crossing to the building where Koppelthorn is located, Snake and Venus are met by Metal Gear Kodoque from the first Acid which was rescued before being destroyed during the events of the last game.

Upon finally meeting with Koppelthorn, Metal Gear Chaioth Ha Qadesh, Lucy, and Dr. Takiyama, Snake and Venus learn that Koppelthorn has been 'resurrecting' his wife in the form of a young girl, Lucy. Before the final fight against Koppelthorn, it is revealed that Snake is actually a Model 3 Test Subject who was created in SaintLogic labs by Koppelthorn's wife. Snake then learns that he is a clone of Solid Snake, who SaintLogic recovered after the Lobito Incident. Snake was sent to Serena to quell an uprising of Model 2 subjects, better known as the Praulia Massacre. The Lucinda File is unmasked to be a log of the events of the incident in Serena. After Snake and Venus defeat Koppelthorn, Lucy reveals herself to not actually be a rebirth of Lucinda Koppelthorn, but rather her own being with the consciousness of Lucinda. Lucy then declares the truth about Lucinda, who had helped Snake to escape SaintLogic and wanted to die because of her inhumane actions. Lucy kills Tom Koppelthorn and takes control of Metal Gear Chaioth Ha Qadesh acting on her true nature of being test subject designed to kill. Snake and Venus must once again defeat Chaioth Ha Qadesh and Lucy as well.

Snake and Venus next learn that the SaintLogic facility is wired with explosives, and learn the location of Dr. Takiyama as well as the Lucinda File. After recovering both, Venus pulls a gun on Snake at Wiseman's command. Wiseman announces that he was responsible for the Praulia Massacre because he wanted to hurry along the project with a field test. An ethnic uprising that was occurring in Serena at the time was an opportune time to test the SaintLogic subjects. This initial test did not provide sufficient information concerning the limits of the test subjects, and Wiseman ordered for the subjects to be pushed to their limits. After the massacre, Wiseman arranged for Snake to flee to the United States. Dalton was informed of Snake's entering the country and, as desired by Wiseman, apprehended Snake. Wiseman's original plan was for Dalton and Snake to attempt to infiltrate SaintLogic but become tangled in the facilities guards. At this time Wiseman was to have Venus work her way through SaintLogic and recover the Lucinda File, and place any blame on Dalton and Snake. Venus is then revealed to be a test subject, newer than Snake, who was placed in the care of Wiseman after the activities in Serena. Snake learns that Venus was the cause of his amnesia, as she had shot him during the Praulia Massacre. Snake and Venus duel and, following Venus's defeat, work their way out of the SaintLogic buildings with Dr. Takiyama. Venus and Dr. Takiyama escape however Snake is trapped inside. Venus and Takiyama escape the building safely, and outside SaintLogic witness Metal Gear Chaioth Ha Qadesh return to life. The U.S. military, which has been called in to secure SaintLogic, fires upon Metal Gear and a missile from its rear launches, and lands in the ocean a short distance away. It is revealed in a cutscene that Snake was in the launcher instead of a missile and utilized it to escape, breaking most bones in his body. The game ends with Dr. Takiyama and Venus safely recovering from the SaintLogic incident, with General Wiseman arrested and facing charges of war crimes. Snake, who has recovered extremely quickly, is confronted by Dalton, who provides him with a United States identity, his friends, and $15 million.

In the North American and European versions, several illustrations that accompany the end credits show what happens to the game's main characters after the incident. Wiseman is shown being led away by law enforcement personnel, but his manner remains undaunted, implying perhaps that there is yet a way for him out of his predicament. Dalton gets dressed down by a superior at the FBI, although he retains a smug demeanor not unlike Wiseman's. Dr. Takiyama is merely shown looking pensive in the helicopter that carries her off the island. And in a vignette that could have been taken much later after the events of the SaintLogic incident, Venus is seen manning the checkout counter at a supermarket, hinting at her quiet assimilation into everyday life.

=== Characters ===
- Snake - The primary protagonist in Acid 2. Prior to the events of the game, Snake contracts amnesia and is unable to recall his past. Arriving in the United States illegally, Snake is captured by Dalton and is forced to investigate SaintLogic's practices. He is then placed under Wiseman's command, with whom he cooperates only to get his memory back. He eventually learns he is not the "real" Solid Snake per se, but rather a full-grown clone of Solid Snake from the original Acid, created from cell samples taken from the Lobito Island incident. As with Solid Snake in the main series, Snake is voiced by David Hayter in English and Akio Ōtsuka in Japanese.
- Venus - Female partner to Snake. She also suffers from memory loss and feels no remorse for killing. Her suit sleeves contain shuriken-type devices, although they are only seen used in cutscenes. She was sent to the SaintLogic facility by Wiseman to contain the situation there. Originally, Wiseman never planned to make his presence or Venus' presence known to Snake and Dalton. Venus is voiced by Kathryn Fiore in English and Rika Komatsu in Japanese.
- Dalton - An ex-FBI agent who captures Snake in the beginning of the game and forces him to infiltrate the SaintLogic facility to retrieve files on SaintLogic's business practices.
- Wiseman - General with the United States Department of Defense. He claims to know about Snake's and Venus's past, and offers it in return for their assistance with his operation. He prefers efficiency over morality, and appears to have a hidden agenda.
- Dr. Thomas Koppelthorn - Vice President of SaintLogic, who demands the release of 12 high-ranking officials or he will launch a nuclear attack. He also demands that the SaintLogic president, Rodzinski, hand over the Lucinda File to him. Although this is Dr. Koppelthorn's first appearance in a Metal Gear game, previous games have referred to the character. In Metal Gear: Ghost Babel, Mei Ling attempts to quote from him, only to get interrupted by Snake every time. In Metal Gear Solid 2: Substance, the Koppelthorn Engine is a VR simulation program that actually serves as a gateway to parallel worlds and is mentioned in one of the Snake Tales, External Gazer.
- Rodzinski - President of SaintLogic. Rodzinski has possession of the Lucinda file and is unwilling to reveal it to anyone. It is later discovered that Rodzinski was involved in the events of the Lucinda file and does not wish their contents to be publicized.
- B.B. - Self-proclaimed hacker extraordinaire. B.B. views the incident as some kind of game. He occasionally contacts Snake though the Codec with advice. His image is firewalled and cannot be seen. In the end, Wiseman sends his troops after him revealing that B.B. stood for BlackBoard and that B.B. was operating out of a small computer lab in St. Crescendo Elementary School, located in the state of Virginia. However, B.B. managed to hypnotize the President just in time through his monitor and arranged for the DoD to be sent in to arrest Wiseman.
- Lucinda Koppelthorn - Thomas Koppelthorn's deceased wife. She was killed in the Praulia Massacre and left a record of what the test subjects really did, this record is called the "Lucinda File". Snake is accused by Koppelthorn of having murdered his wife, when, in reality, Lucinda actually wished to kill herself for performing extensive experiments on humans (which usually destroyed their body and sometimes their mind).
- Vince - Chief of security at SaintLogic hired by Rodinski. He wields an RPG-7. Vince is voiced by James C. Mathis III in English and Mahito Ōba in Japanese.
- Dr. Michiko Takiyama (滝山 美知子, Takiyama Michiko) - Researcher at SaintLogic who assists Koppelthorn out of pity. It was implied in the story that Dr. Takiyama had performed 'special favors' for Rodzinski and Koppelthorn to get to where she is in the company today.
- Lucy - A young girl who is always with Dr. Takiyama and appears to be timid. In reality, she is the reincarnation of Lucinda Koppelthorn, and is bound to the EGO system.
- Harab Serap - Harab Serap is one of the test subjects in SaintLogic. Once he was released, he attempted to kill all those who tormented him, and abused him. In the Kabbalah faith, Harab and Serap are two Sephiroth. Harab Serap is voiced by Peter Lurie in English and Kazunari Tanaka in Japanese.
- Golab - Golab is a test subject who carries a large tube filled with oil or some kind of gasoline. Golab claims to be Snake's brother, which is confirmed in later events, seeing as they are both test subjects. Golab is another of the Kabbalah's Sephiroth. Golab is voiced by Roger Rose in English and Naoki Imamura in Japanese.
- Chaigidiel - Another of SaintLogic's test subjects. Chaigidiel's specialty is in hypnosis and psychic powers, which he can use to walk on ceilings and take control of one of the characters. He is armed with an M79 grenade launcher. Yet another Sephiroth of the Kabbalah faith. Chaigidiel is voiced by Philip Proctor in English and Naoki Tatsuta in Japanese.

== Release ==
The Western versions include ten new cards not included in the Japanese release, six of which are based on Metal Gear Solid 4: Guns of the Patriots: namely Solid Snake, Otacon, Metal Gear Mk. II, GEKKO, Solid Eye, and No Smoking. The remaining four were fan made submissions selected in a Konami sponsored contest by four online publications (Game Informer, IGN, GameSpy, and 1UP.com), which were an alternate Naked Snake card from MGS3, a Banana Skin, Possessed Arm, and Emma's Parrot.

The game's soundtrack was composed by Akihiro Honda, Hiroshi Tanabe, Nobuko Toda and Shuichi Kobori. It was released along with the Metal Gear Acid soundtrack on December 21, 2005, in the two-disc compilation Metal Gear Acid 1 and 2 Original Soundtrack.

== Reception ==
Metal Gear Acid 2 received generally positive reviews from critics and the public. It holds a Metacritic score of 80 based on 51 critic reviews, with a separate score of 8.1 out of 10 based on 30 user ratings.
