= NeverDead =

2012 video game

- Developer: Rebellion Developments
- Publisher: Konami
- Director: Shinta Nojiri
- Producers: Shinta Nojiri; Shinya Fujimatsu
- Artist: Atsushi Tsujimoto
- Writer: Shinta Nojiri
- Composers: Mark Rutherford, Osamu Migitera, Seiro Hirose, Rina Yugi, Akihiro Honda, Kazuma Jinnouchi, Yuko Takahashi, Daisuke Kurosawa, Yasunori Nishiki
- Platforms: PlayStation 3, Xbox 360
- Release: NA: 31 January 2012; JP: 2 February 2012; EU: 3 February 2012; AU: 23 February 2012
- Genres: Third-person shooter, hack and slash
- Mode: Single-player

NeverDead (ネバーデッド, NebāDeddo) is a 2012 third-person shooter hack and slash video game developed by Rebellion Developments and published by Konami. The game was released for PlayStation 3 and Xbox 360 in North America in January 2012 and in February worldwide. It received mixed reviews from critics.

== Gameplay ==
The protagonist is an immortal and is able to survive severe injuries. Over time, the player loses body parts and will have to collect the removed limbs by rolling into them. Players can cause large objects to crush nearby enemies, harming them but not the player themselves. The Gameplay also features puzzle elements. A female partner assists the player, however she is not immortal and the player gets injured trying to protect her.

== Plot ==
The player controls a wisecracking human demon hunter named Bryce, who was cursed with immortality five hundred years ago by the demon king Astaroth. Now in modern times, he hunts demons for money and revenge with a female private investigator in order to stop a demonic invasion that has nearly destroyed the city.

== Characters ==
=== Bryce Boltzmann ===
Voiced by (English): David Lodge
Voiced by (Japanese): Hiroshi Shirokuma

A wisecracking demon hunter who was cursed with immortality five centuries ago by Astaroth after he witnessed the brutal murder of his wife at the hands of the aforementioned demon king. Since then, he has become a disheveled, bitter alcoholic who hunts demons for money and revenge, often using his ability to remove and reattach his limbs to his own advantage. Now in modern times, he is accompanied by a female private investigator, Arcadia.

=== Arcadia Maximille ===
Voiced by (English): Michelle Ruff
Voiced by (Japanese): Sayaka Kinoshita

Bryce's partner. She is cold and methodical.

=== Astaroth ===
Voiced by (English): Joe Romersa
Voiced by (Japanese): Kiyoyuki Yanada

The main antagonist of the game. Astaroth is the demon king who murdered Bryce's wife. While Bryce was horrified by the murder, Astaroth gouged out one of his eyes and cursed Bryce with immortality. Astaroth is the demon king responsible for the demon invasion in the city.

== Development ==
NeverDead was directed by Shinta Nojiri, and developed by Rebellion Developments.

== Music ==
The main soundtrack to NeverDead was composed by Megadeth, while the credits song "Pharaoh★Love" is composed by Osamu Migitera (Des-ROW) with vocals by Megumi Nakajima or Brittney Snyder depending if the player has set the game language in Japanese or English. Also, the song was made playable in REFLEC BEAT limelight and Pop'n Music Portable 2.

== Reception ==
Reception

Aggregate score
| Aggregator | Score | |
| Aggregator | PS3 | Xbox 360 |
|---|---|---|
| Metacritic | 50/100 | 52/100 |

Review scores
| Publication | Score | |
| Publication | PS3 | Xbox 360 |
|---|---|---|
| Destructoid | N/A | 2/10 |
| Edge | N/A | 7/10 |
| Electronic Gaming Monthly | N/A | 6/10 |
| Eurogamer | N/A | 6/10 |
| Famitsu | 32/40 | 32/40 |
| Game Informer | 4/10 | 4/10 |
| GameRevolution | N/A | 2/5 |
| GameSpot | 6/10 | 6/10 |
| GameTrailers | N/A | 4.3/10 |
| Giant Bomb | N/A | 2/5 |
| IGN | 3/10 | 3/10 |
| Joystiq | N/A | 3/5 |
| Official Xbox Magazine (US) | N/A | 7.5/10 |
| PlayStation: The Official Magazine | 5/10 | N/A |
| Digital Spy | N/A | 3/5 |
| The Escapist | N/A | 3/5 |

NeverDead received "mixed or average" reviews from critics, according to review aggregator website Metacritic. In Japan, Famitsu gave it a score of all four eights for a total of 32 out of 40.

The Digital Fix gave the PlayStation 3 version a score of seven out of ten and said that "its successes far outweigh its failings and for every frustration such as the pitch black sequence (where you have to set yourself on fire to find your way out) there are multiple moments of humour backed up by a solid combat system. It's not going to change the shape of gaming or be remembered forever but it far exceeds any claims that the body destruction element is a gimmick and nothing more. NeverDead deserves to be played but a sequel only deserves to happen if Konami and Rebellion give Bryce the world and freedom you will want to see him in."

Digital Spy gave the Xbox 360 version a score of three stars out of five and called it "a prime example of a game that conjures an excellent premise, but then destroys it with poor design choices. We don't play games to be exhausted, we play them to have fun, and there are just too many moments in this game that feel like a chore." The Escapist similarly gave it a score of three stars out of five and said, "NeverDead does try something new and original, but its mechanics are unpolished and poorly implemented."

However, 411Mania gave it a score of 4.5 out of 10 and said it was "very predictable and uninspired." GameZone gave the PS3 version 3.5 out of 10 and said, "We had high hopes for NeverDead, especially after seeing it at E3, but the end result falls apart as quickly as Bryce does. The gameplay never really develops a structure that leads to any fun, and the presentation's flaws are hard to overlook."
