= Metal Gear: Ghost Babel =

- Original Japanese packaging artwork, depicting Christine Jenner and Solid Snake
- Developers: Konami Computer Entertainment Japan; Tose
- Publisher: Konami
- Director: Shinta Nojiri
- Producers: Hideo Kojima; Motoyuki Yoshioka
- Designer: Shinta Nojiri
- Programmer: Kentaro Kiyohara
- Artists: Ikuya Nakamura; Yoji Shinkawa
- Writer: Tomokazu Fukushima
- Composers: Norihiko Hibino; Kazuki Muraoka
- Series: Metal Gear
- Platform: Game Boy Color
- Release: JP: April 27, 2000; NA: May 2, 2000; UK: May 5, 2000
- Genres: Action-adventure, stealth
- Modes: Single-player; Multiplayer

Metal Gear: Ghost Babel, (Note: Japanese: メタルギア ゴーストバベル, Hepburn: Metaru Gia: Gōsuto Baberu) released in North America and Europe as Metal Gear Solid, is a 2000 action-adventure stealth game developed and published by Konami for the Game Boy Color. Development began after Konami Computer Entertainment Japan were commissioned by Konami's European branch to develop a portable version of their 1998 PlayStation game Metal Gear Solid. However, Ghost Babel is not a port of Metal Gear Solid, but instead takes place in an alternative continuity set three years after the events of the MSX2 game Metal Gear 2: Solid Snake. Tose assisted on the development. The game was re-released in 2026 for the first time via Metal Gear Solid: Master Collection Vol. 2 under its Japanese name.

== Gameplay ==
A stage of Metal Gear: Ghost Babel. The 2D gameplay format was inherited from Metal Gear 2: Solid Snake with a few elements added from Metal Gear Solid.

Ghost Babel follows the overhead 2D format used in the 1990 MSX2 game Metal Gear 2: Solid Snake while adding a few new elements introduced in Metal Gear Solid. As with previous games in the series, the objective is to infiltrate the enemy's stronghold while avoiding detection from guards or surveillance systems. The player can acquire numerous items and weapons to help them fulfill their mission. One difference from the MSX2 game is that the screen now scrolls when Snake moves throughout a single area instead of using flip-screens. Moreover, all the characters in the game now move in eight directions, allowing both the player and the enemies to move diagonally in addition to the four cardinal directions.

Snake now has the ability to flatten himself into walls like he does in Metal Gear Solid. By flattening himself, Snake can move across the wall (allowing him access to tight passages that are not accessible by walking), scroll the camera behind his position to scout the area ahead, or knock the wall to lure nearby enemy soldiers. Depending on the difficulty, the number of punches required to defeat an enemy soldier differs; in the higher difficulty levels, the enemy soldiers will be knocked unconscious for a while after the first series of punches instead of simply being defeated. Crawling is now assigned to the Start button (instead of pressing two buttons simultaneously), and the changing of weapons and equipment is done on the main game screen rather than on separate sub-screens. Like in previous installments, the player communicates with various allies via a wireless communication device (the Codec), which is also used to save the player's progress.

Ghost Babel uses a stage-based structure with 13 total stages. After completing a stage, the player's performance is graded from "Terrible" to "Excellent". Much like in the original Metal Gear Solid, the player's overall performance is graded with a codename after completing all 13 stages, with the codenames varying depending on the difficulty level chosen at the start of the game.

Players can replay previously cleared stages in order to achieve a higher ranking. After the Story mode is completed, "Special" versions of the stages become available where the player must achieve new objectives (such as collecting FOXHOUND emblems or reaching the goal without being seen). In this Special training mode, the player controls an unknown agent who goes through a VR recreation of Snake's mission in Galuade, while being supervised by a mysterious entity named "No.4." As the player clears more of these stages, No.4 will disclose details of the game's story not revealed in the main campaign. There are also 180 training missions spread across three main categories (sneaking, weapon and advanced) and various sub-categories within each. Most of the missions are recreations of the ones featured in Metal Gear Solid: Integral. A Vs. Battle mode allows two players mode to compete in multiplayer battles using a Game Link Cable. The objective in this mode is to destroy three target drones called WISPs in order to obtain the data disks they carry and access the goal before the other player does. Each player's Snake is invisible to the other unless they enter their opponent's field of vision.

== Plot ==
Seven years after the Outer Heaven uprising, a new Metal Gear prototype (codenamed Gander) has been stolen by a separatist guerrilla group in the region of Gindra in Central Africa. The Gindra Liberation Front (or GLF), led by the mercenary Augustine Eguabon, plans on using the prototype as a means of achieving victory in an ongoing civil war. Solid Snake, the FOXHOUND operative responsible for the destruction of the original Metal Gear seven years before, is brought back from his retirement in Alaska. His mission is to infiltrate the group's headquarters Galuade, the fortress that was formerly Outer Heaven.

During the course of his mission, Snake teams up with Sgt. Christine Jenner, a surviving member of the Delta Force that was sent before him to retrieve Gander. The GLF are assisted by four surviving members of Black Chamber, a defunct special forces unit whose members are given animal-themed codenames similar to FOXHOUND. They are led by Black Arts Viper, a boobytrap specialist who wields a prosthetic left arm. Joining him are Slasher Hawk, an Australian Aboriginal armed with two giant boomerangs who is accompanied in battle by a hawk; Marionette Owl, a former serial killer endowed with owl-like nocturnal vision and attacks with his two bunraku puppets; and Pyro Bison, a pyromaniac armed with a specially prepared flamethrower and fuel pack. As Snake goes deeper into Galuade and confronts each member of Black Chamber, he uncovers a conspiracy involving the GLF and US Government.

== Development ==
Ghost Babel was produced under the request of Konami's European division to release a Game Boy Color version of Metal Gear Solid. The game's director, Shinta Nojiri, later directed Metal Gear Acid and Metal Gear Acid 2, both released for the PlayStation Portable, while character designer Ikuya Nakamura went on to direct the Boktai series on Game Boy Advance and Nintendo DS.

== Reception ==
Reception

Review scores
Publication	Score
Computer and Video Games	5/5
Famitsu	31/40
GameSpot	9.4/10
IGN	10/10
Nintendo Power	7.8/10
Total Game Boy Color	94%

Ghost Babel has an average rating of 95.61% at GameRankings, making it the best-rated game for the Game Boy Color on the site. The Japanese magazine Famitsu awarded it a score of 31 out of 40.

Nintendo Power listed Ghost Babel as the 11th-best Game Boy game, praising it for bringing over elements from the three-dimensional Metal Gear Solid. Ben Reeves from Game Informer called it the eighth-best Game Boy game and considered it a good throwback to the MSX2. GamesRadar listed it as a games they would like to see on the Nintendo 3DS Virtual Console.

Ghost Babel was included in the Metal Gear Solid: Master Collection Vol. 2 compilation, released in August 2026. The collection allows players to rewind gameplay, adjust the visual settings, and remap controls.
