= Metal Gear Solid: The Legacy Collection =

2013 video game compilation

- Developer: Kojima Productions (Note: Bluepoint Games was responsible for MGS2 and MGS3 port, Genki was working on Peace Walker port, while Armature Studio ported these version to PlayStation Vita. Aspect Co. reworked Metal Gear and Metal Gear 2: Solid Snake, which were included in MGS 3 previously.)
- Publisher: Konami
- Producer: Hideo Kojima
- Artist: Yoji Shinkawa
- Series: Metal Gear
- Platform: PlayStation 3
- Release: NA: July 9, 2013; JP: July 11, 2013; EU: September 13, 2013; AU: October 3, 2013
- Genre: Stealth
- Mode: Single-player

Metal Gear Solid: The Legacy Collection (Note: Japanese: METAL GEAR SOLID(メタルギアソリッド)：THE LEGACY COLLECTION(レガシーコレクション), Hepburn: Metaru Gia Soriddo: Regashī Korekushon) is a video game compilation released exclusively for the PlayStation 3. It includes all of the mainline Metal Gear games directed and designed by Hideo Kojima that were released from 1987 through 2012. Bonus content include motion comic adaptations of the Metal Gear Solid graphic novels illustrated by Ashley Wood and a 100-page booklet that catalogs numerous promotional posters, brochures and advertisement related to the games in the compilation. It was released in the Americas on July 9, 2013, in Japan on July 11, 2013, in Europe on September 13, 2013, and in Australia on October 3, 2013.

== Content ==
The Legacy Collection consists of two discs and a booklet. The first disc contains Metal Gear Solid 4, already updated with trophy support. The second disc is a dual-layered Blu-ray disc that contains the Metal Gear Solid HD Collection, plus motion comic versions of IDW's Metal Gear Solid graphic novels (which adapted the storylines of the first two Metal Gear Solid games with artwork by Ashley Wood). The motion comics were previously released in Japan as a two-disc DVD set in 2008 titled Metal Gear Solid 2: Bande Dessinée, but were not released in English until their inclusion in this set. The original Metal Gear Solid and its expansion are not included in either disc, but rather are downloaded from the PlayStation Store using voucher codes included in the set.

The Metal Gear Solid and Sons of Liberty motion comics were originally released in Japan as a two-disc DVD set in 2008 under the title of Metal Gear Solid 2: Bande Dessinée with Japanese voice acting. Although the English versions of both were not released until their inclusion in this set, the credits also have a 2008 copyright date. This, along with the involvement of Ryan Payton, who left Kojima Productions that same year, suggests that the English versions were also produced in 2008.

=== Games ===
The included games are:

Games included in Metal Gear Solid: The Legacy Collection
Title	Original platform	Original release
Metal Gear (Note: Accessible from the main menu in Metal Gear Solid 3)	MSX2	1987
Metal Gear 2: Solid Snake	MSX2	1990
Metal Gear Solid (Note: Included as a download code for the PlayStation Store. The Japanese set includes the original Metal Gear Solid with Japanese voice acting, and Metal Gear Solid: Integral, an expanded edition of the same game with English voice acting and a bonus disc with 300 VR training missions. The content of the bonus disc are the same as Metal Gear Solid: VR Missions. In the European set, Metal Gear Solid VR Missions is titled Metal Gear Solid: Special Missions.)	PS	1998
Metal Gear Solid: VR Missions	PS	1999
Metal Gear Solid 2: Sons of Liberty (Note: HD Edition previously included in Metal Gear Solid HD Collection.)	PS2	2001
Metal Gear Solid 3: Snake Eater	PS2	2004
Metal Gear Solid 4: Guns of the Patriots	PS3	2008
Metal Gear Solid: Peace Walker	PSP	2010

=== Videos ===
- Metal Gear Solid: Digital Graphic Novel (Note: Accessible on a standard Blu-ray player or via the video playback option of the PS3.)
- Metal Gear Solid 2: Digital Graphic Novel

=== Booklet ===
- Metal Gear Solid: The Legacy (Note: First print run only.)

== Reception ==
The compilation received high praise from critics, with the comprehensiveness of the collection being a central highlight. It scored a 93 out of 100 on Metacritic, indicating "universal acclaim".
