= Metal Gear Acid =

2004 video game

- Developer: Konami Computer Entertainment Japan
- Publisher: Konami
- Director: Shinta Nojiri
- Producers: Hideo Kojima; Masahiro Hinami
- Designer: Shinta Nojiri
- Artist: Tsubasa Masao
- Writers: Moku Tochibori; Shuyo Murata; Tomokazu Fukushima
- Composers: Nobuko Toda; Shuichi Kobori; Akihiro Honda
- Series: Metal Gear
- Platforms: PlayStation Portable; J2ME (mobile)
- Release: PlayStation Portable: JP: December 16, 2004; NA: March 24, 2005; EU: September 1, 2005; Mobile phone: EU: March 10, 2008
- Genres: Tactical role-playing, stealth, digital collectible card game
- Modes: Single-player, multiplayer

Metal Gear Acid (Note: Japanese: メタルギア アシッド, Hepburn: Metaru Gia Ashiddo) (stylized as Metal Gear Ac!d) is a turn-based collectible card tactical role-playing game developed by Konami Computer Entertainment Japan for the PlayStation Portable. A launch title for the PSP, it was released in Japan on December 16, 2004, in North America on March 24, 2005, and in Europe on September 1, 2005. A Java ME version for mobile phones was released by Glu Mobile in 2008 titled Metal Gear Acid Mobile.

Acid focuses on turn-based tactics, using a trading card-based system to control the main character's movements and actions. Acid in the name stands for "Active Command Intelligence Duel". The cards are not truly collectible, as the game is complete with a single purchase. However, the game does feature deck design and deck optimization elements. The game allows for multiplayer gameplay by wireless ad-hoc connections of two PSPs.

== Gameplay ==
Before each round, the player can customize the deck of cards used by the main characters. The majority of the cards are based upon elements spanning the entire Metal Gear series, such as weaponry, characters, and even the Metal Gear itself. When the game is started, the player's hand can consist of a maximum of six cards. The maximum number of cards in a deck increases with overall progress. In action mode, the player can choose to use the cards as they are intended or use them to move the character. Most cards only allow the player to move three spaces, while certain cards let the player move up to six or higher.

Cost is an important factor in game play and can be summed up as the weight of the player's action. With some exceptions, all cards have a cost attached to them and when used this cost transfers to the player. Cost varies radically from card to card. The higher the cost a character has, the longer that character must wait until their next turn. The lower the cost a character has, the shorter that character must wait until their next turn. For example: if a player character has a cost of 10 and a guard has a cost of 15, then the character's turn would occur before the guard's.

Some cards can be equipped; cards such as weapon cards, can have other cards attached to them in order to improve performance. In order to fire the weapon, another weapon card that uses the same kind of ammunition must be equipped. Some weapons don't need to be equipped and can be used by themselves, however they are discarded afterwards. Other cards that can be equipped include equipment cards and action cards.

Multiplayer, or "Link Battle", is also a new feature. Two PSP systems running Acid can link wirelessly, allowing players to face each other in a "sneak-off". The objective is to collect a certain number of diskettes before the rival player. Diskettes can be stolen by another player, so there is an emphasis on avoiding detection.

== Plot ==
=== Story ===
In 2016, a jumbo jet carrying Senator Hach, an important politician and likely future presidential candidate, is hijacked by terrorists. In exchange for the senator the terrorists demand from the United States government Pythagoras, a research project being conducted in the Moloni Republic in southern Africa. In efforts to identify these terrorists, the government begins an investigation of Pythagoras.

The Moloni government refuses to cooperate and work with the United States, saying that it doesn't want to interfere in its current affairs. In response, the US sends in a covert special forces team to investigate, but the team is obliterated by armed resistance. With no other options and time running out, the US government calls Solid Snake to infiltrate the laboratory, discover the nature of Pythagoras, and to rescue Senator Hach.

=== Characters ===
- Solid Snake - The main character. A member of FOXHOUND who has achieved legendary status, he is brought to duty to infiltrate the Lobito Physics and Chemistry laboratory compound. Snake is led to believe that he is actually Hans Davis, a researcher involved in the development of the new Metal Gear model.
- Teliko Friedman - A female Japanese-American member of the FBI's Hostage Rescue Team that was sent to the Lobito compound prior to Snake. She rendezvous with Snake and teams up with him as a second playable character in the game. She reappears in Metal Gear Solid: Portable Ops as a hidden playable character.
- Roger McCoy - A CIA operative from New Jersey who serves as Snake's commanding officer in the game. He previously served in the Green Berets and is an acquaintance of Roy Campbell, Snake's former commanding officer.
- Alice Hazel - An English girl who has aided the FBI and CIA in the past with her psychic abilities. She is one of Snake's radio contacts in the game.
- Lt. Leone - The leader of a mercenary group hired by an anti-government militia in the Moloni Republic. He was once known as Jeff Jones and served under McCoy's unit during the Vietnam War until he was suspected of treason.
- Gary Murray - A lab worker who requests Snake's help. He is actually William L. Flemming and is involved in the development of the new Metal Gear.
- Elsie and Frances - A pair of marionettes that carry out the hijacking of Flight 326.
- La Clown - An assassin of unknown gender with the ability to disguise their appearance.
- Viggo Hach - A Dutch-American United States Senator from New York who is a presidential candidate. Taken hostage by terrorists during his flight.
- Lena Arrows - Hach's secretary, who was also caught in the hijacking.
- Minette Donnell - A young girl on the same flight as Hach. She is actually Constance Flemming, the daughter of William L. Flemming.
- Charles Schmeiser - A CIA agent from Toronto, Canada who works under McCoy.

== Production and release ==
According to an interview originally published by Electronic Gaming Monthly with the game's producer, Masahiro Hinami, the 'Acid' part of the title actually has three different meanings. The first meaning refers to Acid's departure from the previous Metal Gear games in terms of style, which is an analogue to acid's ability to dissolve metal. The second is a reference to vecuronium bromide, the chemical used by Elsie and Frances to hijack Flight 326. The third is stated to be an acronym for Active Command Intelligence Duel, a reference to the game's mixture of turn-based tactics with card-based gameplay.

=== Soundtrack ===
The game's soundtrack was composed by Nobuko Toda, Shuichi Kobori and Akihiro Honda. The soundtrack was released on December 21, 2005, packaged with the Metal Gear Acid 2 soundtrack. The album's title is Metal Gear Acid 1 and 2 Original Soundtrack, the first disc of the album featuring the music from the first Metal Gear Acid title.

== Reception ==
Metal Gear Acid received somewhat positive reviews from critics, citing the game's unique mechanics and turn-based stealth. The game holds a 75 on Metacritic, indicating "generally favorable reviews". IGN gave it a 6.5/10, calling the game's story "contrived", and referencing the occasionally frustrating gameplay while praising some elements.

== Sequel ==
Acid was followed by a sequel for the PSP, Metal Gear Acid 2, released the following year. A mobile phone version, Metal Gear Acid Mobile, was also produced.
