= Metal Gear (disambiguation) =

Metal Gear is a video game franchise created by Hideo Kojima.

Metal Gear may also refer to:

- A gear, a rotating machine part
- Metal Gear (mecha), bipedal tanks that appear throughout the various Metal Gear games, acting as the namesake of the series
- Metal Gear (video game), the first entry in the series
- Metal Gear (film), a film adaptation of the game series which is currently in development

== See also ==
- Guilty Gear, another series of video games
