= Metal Gear 2: Solid Snake =

1990 stealth action game

- Packaging illustration by Yoshiyuki Takani
- Developer: Konami
- Publisher: Konami
- Designer: Hideo Kojima
- Programmers: Isao Akada; Toshinari Oka; Hiroyuki Fukui
- Artists: Shuko Fukui; Tomohiro Nishio; Tae Yabu; Yoshihiko Ota
- Writer: Hideo Kojima
- Composers: Masahiro Ikariko; Mutsuhiko Izumi; Yuko Kurahashi; Tomoya Tomita; Kazuhiko Uehara; Yuji Takenouchi; Tsuyoshi Sekito
- Series: Metal Gear
- Platforms: MSX2; Mobile phone (Note: Available via i-mode, EZweb and Vodafone)
- Release: MSX2: JP: July 20, 1990; Mobile phone: JP: October 1, 2004
- Genres: Action-adventure, stealth
- Mode: Single-player

Metal Gear 2: Solid Snake (Note: Japanese: メタルギア２ ソリッドスネーク, Hepburn: Metarugia Tsū: Soriddosunēku) (Note: Some Japanese publications, such as MSX Magazine and MSX FAN, as well as the spine for the soundtrack album, uses Solid Snake over Metal Gear 2 as the main title, listing it as ソリッドスネーク メタルギア2 or simply ソリッドスネーク.) is a 1990 action-adventure stealth game developed and published by Konami for the MSX2. The second mainline installment in the Metal Gear series, it serves as a sequel to the original Metal Gear (1987). Set in 1999, a few years after the events of the original game, (Note: The in-game dialogue establishes that events in the original game occurred three years before, but portions of the manual places the events of the "Outer Heaven dispute" to 1995 (four years prior). The later Metal Gear Solid games use the latter date.) Solid Snake must infiltrate a heavily defended territory in Central Asia known as Zanzibar Land to rescue a kidnapped scientist and destroy the revised "Metal Gear D". The game significantly evolved the stealth-based game system of its predecessor, and uses a storyline dealing with themes such as the nature of warfare and nuclear proliferation.

Metal Gear 2 was written and designed by series's creator Hideo Kojima, who conceived the game in response to Snake's Revenge (1990), a separately produced sequel that was being developed at the time for the NES specifically for the North American and European markets. Metal Gear 2 was released in Japan to positive critical reception, and retrospective reviews have labeled it as one of the best 8-bit games ever made. It was followed by a sequel, Metal Gear Solid, and was released worldwide for the PlayStation in 1998. Metal Gear 2 was re-released alongside the original Metal Gear in the Subsistence version of Metal Gear Solid 3 (2006) with a full English translation and other revisions, which was used for further re-releases on the Metal Gear Solid HD Collection and the Metal Gear Solid: Master Collection.

== Gameplay ==
The ability to crawl under tight spaces and hide from enemies was first added in Solid Snake.

Metal Gear 2 builds upon the stealth-based gameplay system of its predecessor. As in the original Metal Gear, the player's objective is to infiltrate the enemy's stronghold, while avoiding detection from soldiers, cameras, infrared sensors and other surveillance devices. The biggest change in the game was done to the enemy's abilities. Instead of remaining stationed in one screen like in the first game, enemy soldiers can now patrol different screens across a single map. Moreover, guards now have an expanded 45-degree field of vision instead of just seeing in straight lines, along with the ability to turn their heads left or right to see diagonally. Enemy guards can also detect sounds, being able to hear any noise made by the player (such as a punch to the wall or a gunshot made without a suppressor) and will investigate the source of the sound once it is made. Guards can also hear sounds made by the player when walking on certain surfaces, which means that one has to be careful when navigating certain areas. If the player is discovered by the enemy, then a counter will be displayed on the upper-right side of the screen that will go down after the enemy has lost track of the player. When the counter reaches zero, the alert phase will go off and the game will return to normal.

The player is given a variety of new maneuvers and tools to help them remain undetected and complete the game. For example, the player can now kneel and crawl in addition to walking, allowing the player to avoid making noise over certain terrains, pick up land mines, and hide in tight spaces such as under desks or inside air ducts. A radar with a 3×3 grid on the upper right of the screen shows the player's current area in the center grid (as a red dot), with enemy soldiers as white dots, allowing the player to determine what's ahead. However, the radar is disabled when the game enters alert phase. The radar can also be used with the mine detector equipped to determine the locations of enemy mines or launch Stinger missiles onto an airborne target. Many of the weapons and equipment from the first game are brought over along with new items such as robotic mice used to distract enemies, a camouflaged mat and three different types of rations, each with special attributes. Health and carrying capacity are increased each time a boss is defeated.

The transceiver has also been greatly revamped from the first game as well, with conversations now being context-sensitive rather than being simply area-oriented. The transceiver screen now displays the faces of Snake and the radio contact he's currently communicating with. The player can also talk to children living in the fortress to gain new information; the player is penalized with a loss of health if they kill a child. The areas are more varied than in the previous MSX2 game and a number of puzzles must be fulfilled to complete the game, such as luring a carrier pigeon with a specific kind of ration, chasing after a female spy to the ladies' lavatory, and deciphering secret tap codes to gain new frequency numbers.

The MSX2 version requires the use of either a floppy disk drive or a Game Master II utility cartridge to save progress. In the absence of either media, a password can also be written down to reload progress. Later versions of the game removed the password feature in favor of standardized storage media such as memory cards and internal hard disk drives.

== Plot ==
=== Setting ===
Metal Gear 2 is set in a near-future world in which the Cold War continued into the 1990s, with the game's events taking place in 1999, three years after the events of the original Metal Gear (later retconned to four years in Metal Gear Solid).

=== Characters ===
Solid Snake, formerly retired FOXHOUND agent and hero of the original Metal Gear returns as the playable character. His new mission is to rescue the kidnapped Czechoslovak biologist Dr. Kio Marv from the forces of Zanzibar Land. He is assisted by a radio support crew consisting of Roy Kyanbel (spelled "Roy Campbell" in later versions), his new commanding officer; McDonnell Miller, a survival coach and drill instructor; George Kesler ("George Kasler" in later versions), a military strategist; and Yozev Norden (renamed Johan Jacobsen in the later revised versions), a wildlife expert. Also assisting him on-site are Horry White ("Holly White" in later versions), a CIA agent posing as a journalist; Natasha Marcova (Gustava Heffner in later versions), an StB agent, Olympic gold medalist and Dr. Marv's bodyguard; and Dr. Petrovich Madnar ("Drago Pettrovich Madnar" in later versions), the Metal Gear designer from the first game, who was captured along with Dr. Marv. Also appearing in the game are Big Boss, the renegade former commander of FOXHOUND, and Grey Fox ("Gray Fox" in later versions), who disappeared following the events of the Outer Heaven incident.

The bosses of this installment consist of Black Color (Black Ninja in later versions), an experimental drug-enhanced ninja from a disbanded NASA project (who is revealed to be Kyle Schneider from the original Metal Gear); Running Man, a former Olympic runner turned terrorist; Red Blaster, an explosive expert from Spetsnaz; Ultra Box (the Four Horsemen in later version), an assassination squad specializing in confined spaces; Predator (Jungle Evil in later versions), a jungle warfare expert from the South African Reconnaissance Command; and Night Sight (Night Fright in later versions), an assassin from Vietnam who uses a state-of-the-art stealth suit that renders him invisible to both radar and the human eye.

=== Story ===
A major oil crisis seriously affects the global economy in the late 1990s, with petrol deposits running out faster than previous estimates. Efforts to adopt alternative energy sources and attempts to drill for more oil fail to take up the slack. To counter the problem, Czech scientist Dr. Kio Marv bio-engineers a new species of algae, OILIX, that could produce petroleum-grade hydrocarbons with little expense and effort. He unveils the algae to the World Energy Conference in Prague and was on his way to a demonstration in the United States when he was kidnapped by soldiers from Zanzibar Land, a Central Asian country established in 1997 after a successful independence war against the Soviet Union. (Note: The plot summary in Metal Gear Solid replaces all references to the Soviet Union with the CIS.) NATO discovers that Zanzibar Land's leaders plan to hold the world hostage by controlling the supply of oil through OILIX and nuclear warheads pillaged from old stockpiles marked for dismantling in light of global efforts toward nuclear disarmament. FOXHOUND's new commander, Roy Campbell, brings Solid Snake out of retirement and sends him to Zanzibar Land to rescue Dr. Marv on Christmas Eve 1999.

Over the course of his mission, Snake teams up with Holly White, a CIA operative posing as a journalist, and Gustava Heffner, an StB agent and Dr. Marv's bodyguard. He is also reunited with Dr. Drago Pettrovich Madnar, the Metal Gear inventor from Outer Heaven, who claims to have been once again kidnapped and forced to work on another Metal Gear project (named Metal Gear D) for Zanzibar Land, as well as oversee mass-production of smaller, non-nuclear-equipped Metal Gear units. Snake learns from Dr. Madnar that Big Boss, Snake's former superior, survived the events of the first game and now leads Zanzibar Land.

Solid Snake confronts Gray Fox in one of the final battles.

As Snake, Heffner, and Dr. Madnar head toward Zanzibar Land's main prison, Heffner is killed by a missile fired by Metal Gear D and Dr. Madnar is recaptured by the enemy. The new Metal Gear's pilot is revealed to be Gray Fox. Determined to finish his mission, Snake fights against Zanzibar Land's elite mercenary force and manages to reach Dr. Marv's cell.

Snake arrives too late, as he finds Dr. Marv's corpse and the OILIX data. Holly later tips him off that he actually died under Dr. Madnar's torture. In addition, Snake learns that Madnar volunteered his services to Zanzibar Land to finish work on Metal Gear as revenge against the scientific community shunning him after the events of the first game. Snake incapacitates Madnar when the latter attempts to attack him.

Snake faces off against Gray Fox in Metal Gear D and eventually destroys the mech. Both men later fight hand-to-hand in a minefield, and Snake defeats him. As he tries to escape, Snake meets Big Boss. Having lost his equipment and with no weapons at his disposal, Snake is forced to improvise using the only items he can find: a lighter and aerosol can. Fashioning a makeshift flamethrower, Snake defeats Big Boss for the second time. Snake and Holly escape together, and they deliver the OILIX formula to Campbell.

== Development ==
Following the success of the NES version of Metal Gear, which sold over a million units in North America, Konami began the development of a sequel for the same platform titled Snake's Revenge designed specifically for the overseas market. Hideo Kojima, who directed the first MSX2 game but was not involved with either of the two NES games, did not have any plans to develop a sequel himself at the time until he became reacquainted with a junior coworker who was assigned to work on Snake's Revenge on a train ride in Tokyo. The coworker revealed his involvement with the project and encouraged Kojima to create his own sequel. By the end of the train ride, Kojima had already envisioned the basic premise for the game. After undergoing a business trip to the sales division of Konami, Kojima successfully convinced his superiors, who were hesitant to develop a Metal Gear sequel for the Japanese market due to poor sales of the Famicom conversion of the first game, to approve the development of Metal Gear 2: Solid Snake.

In order to accurately portray realism in the game, Kojima and his crew consulted various references, including a former Green Beret turned author, and even participated in a series of survival games in a forest located in a mountain near their workplace. Originally Metal Gear 2 was announced with a February to March 1990 release window, but was delayed to July, undergoing an increase in ROM size from 3 megabits to 4 megabits. Metal Gear 2 also employs Konami's proprietary SCC sound source that has been used in all of their MSX titles since Nemesis 2. Development of Metal Gear 2 was briefly suspended in order to help out on the development of SD Snatcher, which was being developed at the same time by a separate team.

Kojima originally wanted the title of the sequel to be simply Solid Snake, the decision to use the protagonist's name for the title of a sequel being inspired by the Indiana Jones movie series, but Metal Gear 2 was added as a fore-title under the insistence of Konami's sales and marketing department.

In the original MSX2 release of Metal Gear 2, the character portraits for various characters were based on the likeness of various movie characters: Solid Snake was based on Mel Gibson in Lethal Weapon, Big Boss based on Sean Connery in The Hunt for Red October, Grey Fox based on Tom Berenger in Platoon, Roy Campbell based on Richard Crenna in Rambo, and Holly White based on Brenda Bakke in Gunhed.

== Releases ==
Snake's portrait in the original MSX2 version (left) was based on the likeness of actor Mel Gibson. In the re-released versions, Snake was redesigned to resemble his future self in the original Metal Gear Solid.

The MSX2 version of Metal Gear 2 was released in Japan on July 20, 1990. Unlike its predecessor, no official English localization was produced (as Konami had already discontinued sales of their MSX games in Europe), although a fan translation was later produced in 1997 by the MSX hobbyist group G&T International. Unofficial imports of the game had reached Europe by 1996, with some fans at the time requesting a port for the PlayStation.

The first port of Metal Gear 2 to another platform was the Japanese feature phone version released on October 1, 2004 as a downloadable app on i-mode, EZweb, and Yahoo! Mobile services. This version features a few additions over the original MSX2 version, such as an easy mode and an unlockable boss rush mode after clearing the main game once, but also include some other adjustments and changes, most notably the replacement of the portraits used during the codec conversation sequences. While the portraits in the MSX2 version were modeled after real-life celebrities, the new portraits were instead designed to more closely resemble Metal Gear Solid illustrator Yoji Shinkawa's character designs in the later installments. These changes would also be implemented in the version included in Metal Gear Solid 3: Subsistence for the PlayStation 2, an expanded edition of Metal Gear Solid 3: Snake Eater released in Japan in 2005 that included full ports of both Metal Gear and Metal Gear 2 as part of its newly added content.

Subsistence would later be released in North America and Europe in 2006 with full English localizations of both MSX2 games, marking the first time that Metal Gear 2 was given an international release. The two MSX2 games would later be included in the HD remastered version of Metal Gear Solid 3 released for the PlayStation 3 and Xbox 360 in 2011 and PlayStation Vita in 2012. Both MSX2 games were also released as a part of the Metal Gear Solid Master Collection series for the Nintendo Switch, PlayStation 5, Windows, and Xbox Series X/S on October 24, 2023. It was available as additional content with the stand-alone re-release of the original Metal Gear Solid, as well as part of the compilation Metal Gear Solid: Master Collection Vol. 1, which also includes Metal Gear Solid 2 and Metal Gear Solid 3 among other content.

Metal Gear 2 was also released for the Wii Virtual Console exclusively in Japan on March 30, 2010. Like all Virtual Console games, Metal Gear 2 is emulated from the original MSX2 hardware rather than being ported from the mobile phone version like the Subsistence and HD Edition ports, although this version of the game has been patched to use the revised character portraits rather than the original ones.

=== Soundtrack ===
The game's music was written by Konami Kukeiha Club members Tsuyoshi Sekito, Masahiro Ikariko, Mutsuhiko Izumi, Yuko Kurahashi, Tomoya Tomita, Kazuhiko Uehara, and Yuji Takenouchi. The cartridge for the MSX2 version carried a custom sound chip, the SCC (previously employed in games such as Nemesis 2 and Snatcher), which enhanced the music and sound effects beyond the MSX's standard PSG chip.

Arranged music based on Metal Gear 2: Solid Snake was used for the VR training disc in Metal Gear Solid: Integral (which was released in North America as Metal Gear Solid: VR Missions). Additionally, Integral features two hidden tunes based on Metal Gear 2 available via a secret codec frequency in the main game. One is an arranged version of the "Theme of Solid Snake", while the other is an arrangement of "Zanzibar Breeze" (both listenable by contacting CODEC frequency 140.66 in certain locations). "Theme of Solid Snake" also made an appearance in Nintendo's 2008 crossover fighting game Super Smash Bros. Brawl and a re-arranged version is included in the 2018 fighting game Super Smash Bros. Ultimate.

== Reception ==
During its initial release, Metal Gear 2 was ranked on MSX Magazine's Top 30 best-selling MSX games list for six months, premiering at the No. 1 spot on the October 1990 issue. Metal Gear 2: Solid Snake would later receive near universal-acclaim by retro game reviewers. According to Paul Soth of GameSpy, the game surpassed its predecessor Metal Gear in every way. In addition to praising the gameplay, he also praised the game's "gripping, well-written storyline" for its "rich characterization" and its "same quality of storytelling that made MGS so compelling." He concluded that players will not be disappointed by "the great gameplay and story," and that it remains "one of the best 8-bit games ever made." Game Informer was more critical of the game, however, giving it a 7 out of 10. They wrote that in order to reach the most pivotal moments in the game's story, "you must endure some of the most ridiculous situations Solid Snake has ever seen," and that "the game's focus on constant backtracking and keycard acquisition makes it too repetitive." They concluded that "only diehard fans will find the experience rewarding" and that the best way to play the game is through the bonus disc of Metal Gear Solid 3: Subsistence.

=== Sequel and legacy ===
A direct sequel to the game, titled Metal Gear Solid, was released in 1998 for the PlayStation. Its game mechanics, despite a transition to 3D graphics, remained largely similar to its 2D predecessor and included plot summaries of the first two MSX2 games (accessible in the Special mode under "Previous Operations"). As such, Retro Gamer regarded Metal Gear 2 to be "as close as anyone can get to playing Metal Gear Solid in 2D", putting it above the Game Boy Color game released a decade later in 2000. Retro Gamer also included it among top ten MSX games. Jeremy Parish of 1UP.com referred to Metal Gear Solid as "basically a high-spec remake of Metal Gear 2." Nickolai Adkins of 1UP also noted how much of the scenario and plot elements in Metal Gear 2 were recycled in Metal Gear Solid, ranging from "Snake emerging from retirement to rescue a kidnapped non-soldier personnel" in the beginning to "an escape sequence where Snake is accompanied by his female accomplice/love interest" at the end. IGN notes that Metal Gear 2 introduced stealth mechanics such as making noise to attract guards, crouching and crawling on the ground, disarming mines, and enemies having view cones.
