= Snake's Revenge =

1990 video game

- North American box art
- Developer: Konami
- Publishers: NA: Ultra Games; EU: Konami (UK)
- Designers: A. Nozaki; Takeshi Fujimoto
- Programmers: Hitoshi Akamatsu; Kouki Yamashita; Yasuo Okuda; S. Fukuoka
- Composer: Tsutomu Ogura
- Series: Metal Gear
- Platform: Nintendo Entertainment System
- Release: NA: April 1990; EU: March 1991
- Genres: Action-adventure, stealth
- Mode: Single-player

Snake's Revenge (also known as Snake's Revenge: Metal Gear 2) is a 1990 action-adventure stealth game developed and published by Konami for the Nintendo Entertainment System. It is a stand-alone sequel to Metal Gear that was released in North America (under the Ultra Games brand) and the PAL region following the international commercial success of the NES version. The game was produced without the involvement of series creator Hideo Kojima, who went on to develop a separate sequel for the MSX2 titled Metal Gear 2: Solid Snake, which was released later during the same year in Japan.

== Gameplay ==
One of the side-view areas from Snake's Revenge

As in the original Metal Gear, the player's objective is to infiltrate the enemy's stronghold while avoiding detection from enemy soldiers or surveillance devices. To fulfill their mission, the player must collect a variety of weapons and equipment, such as firearms, explosives, and rations, as well as card keys to access new areas. If the player is discovered by the enemy, the game will go into an alert phase, causing enemy soldiers to enter the screen and attack the player. The player must defeat a certain number of enemy soldiers to return to the infiltration phase or go to a different floor or area. In some cases, particularly when a guard sees the player and only a single, red exclamation mark (!) appears over his head instead of two (!!), the player can also escape the alert phase by simply moving to the adjacent screen.

A change to the original Metal Gear formula is the fact that the player now begins the game with a combat knife and a handgun already in their equipment. The A button is used for firearms and explosives as in the original game, whereas the B button is used for a melee attack with a punch or a knife depending on which one is assigned. The knife can be used to instantly kill guards at close range, but guards who are defeated with punches instead will occasionally leave behind an ammo box or a single ration unit.

As in the original Metal Gear, Snake's maximum health and carrying capacity are determined by his rank, with the highest level being six stars. The player must rescue various hostages scattered throughout various areas until enough have been rescued for a promotion. The player will also encounter enemy officers in certain rooms who can be interrogated by applying truth gas unto them. Successful interrogations are counted alongside rescued hostages for promotions.

The interface of the player's transceiver has also been greatly changed from the original Metal Gear. Instead of dialing frequency numbers, Snake now has a set list of three contacts (John, Nick, and Jennifer) that he can communicate with and a radar that is activated whenever it detects a tracking signal transmitting from a nearby area. Unlike in the original Metal Gear, the transceiver cannot be used when the player enters alert mode.

Snake's Revenge features a varied progression of areas such as a jungle, a warehouse, a cargo ship, and a train, as well as the usual encounters with enemy bosses. In addition to the standard top-view areas, the player must also go through a series of side-view areas that play in a manner similar to Rush 'n Attack, in which Snake proceeds by walking, jumping, or crawling on his stomach while avoiding detection as usual. While in a side-view area, the player is limited to only the knife or handgun as their standard weapon, although plastic explosives can be planted as well to eliminate obstructions. Some of these areas require the player to crawl underwater to progress, resulting in the need for oxygen tanks to proceed without sustaining damage. Each time Snake's oxygen gauge runs out, a tank will be used automatically to refill the gauge until supplies last.

== Plot ==
Three years after the events of the original Metal Gear, FOXHOUND discovers that a hostile nation in the Middle East may have got hold of the plans for Metal Gear and is secretly constructing a new model. Lieutenant Solid Snake, the FOXHOUND operative responsible for the destruction of Metal Gear, is given orders to lead a three-man team to the enemy's base consisting of himself and two fellow operatives: John Turner, a former Navy Intelligence agent and infiltration pro; and Nick Myer, a weapons and explosive expert formerly with the Marines. The codename of the mission is Operation 747.

Snake infiltrates the enemy's jungle base with the help of John, who acts as a decoy by allowing himself to be captured. Snake eventually learns that the enemy is transporting their weapons, a set of mass-produced Metal Gear tanks, on a cargo ship. Snake blows up the ship's ammunition cache and escapes with the help of the team's helicopter pilot while the ship sinks.

The pilot informs Snake that the enemy has a prototype of the new Metal Gear 2 model in their main base and is told to contact their double agent, Jennifer, on the inside. As Snake goes deep into the base, he defeats an impostor posing as John, regains contact with Nick and eventually contacts Jennifer, who reveals that the enemy commander is planning to launch nukes around the globe. However, as Snake approaches the commander's lair, Nick is killed and Jennifer is exposed as a spy and captured. Snake confronts the enemy's commander, who reveals himself to be a cybernetically enhanced Big Boss, having survived his previous encounter with Snake. Snake defeats Big Boss and rescues Jennifer, who shows him to the storage facility where Metal Gear 2 is located. Snake destroys the weapon before its launch countdown is completed.

In the aftermath of Operation 747, the United Nations declares "World Peace Day". John Turner is declared missing in action and removed from Navy records, while Nick Myer is awarded three posthumous promotions.

== Development ==
Konami began development of Snake's Revenge following the release of the NES version of the first Metal Gear, as a sequel produced specifically for the Western market. Hideo Kojima, the designer of the original MSX2 version of Metal Gear, was not involved in the production of Snake's Revenge. According to Kojima, one of the developers working on Snake's Revenge informed him of the game. He encouraged Kojima to develop a true sequel to Metal Gear with his team, inspiring Kojima to pursue development of Metal Gear 2: Solid Snake on the MSX2, which was released in Japan as the sequel to Metal Gear in place of Snake's Revenge. In turn, Snake's Revenge was released in North America and Europe with no corresponding Famicom version. Development of Snake's Revenge was handled by a Konami division in Kobe, which includes staff members who worked on Castlevania III: Dracula's Curse including lead programmer Hitoshi Akamatsu.

When interviewed by Steven Kent in 1999, Kojima stated that he enjoyed Snake's Revenge and that he thought it was "faithful to the Metal Gear concept". While Kojima once jokingly stated that Snake's Revenge was "somewhat of a crappy game" during the 2009 Game Developers Conference, he later stated in an interview with Nintendo Power that he does not consider it to be a "bad game".

A handheld electronic game for Snake's Revenge was published by Tiger Electronics.

=== Compilation ===
Snake’s Revenge is included in Metal Gear Solid: Master Collection Vol. 1 for the Nintendo Switch, PlayStation 4, PlayStation 5, Windows, and Xbox Series X/S.

== Reception ==
Reception

Review scores
Publication	Score
AllGame	2.5/5
Consoles +	33%
Joypad	93%
Joystick	92%
Official Nintendo Magazine	49%
Player One	83%
Total!	44%
Video Games (DE)	53%
Banzzaï	90%
Mean Machines	49%
Super Gamer	79%
