= Liquid Snake =

Fictional character from the Metal Gear franchise

- Metal Gear character
- Liquid Snake from Metal Gear Solid
- First game: Metal Gear Solid (1998)
- Created by: Hideo Kojima
- Designed by: Yoji Shinkawa
- Voiced by: English: Cam Clarke (Metal Gear Solid, Metal Gear Solid 2: Sons of Liberty, Metal Gear Solid: The Twin Snakes); Piers Stubbs (Metal Gear Solid V: The Phantom Pain); Japanese: Banjō Ginga (Metal Gear Solid, Metal Gear Solid 2); Yutaro Honjo (Metal Gear Solid V)
- Motion capture: Mark Musashi (The Twin Snakes); Vincent Giry (The Phantom Pain)

Liquid Snake (Note: Japanese: リキッド・スネーク, Hepburn: Rikiddo Sunēku) is a fictional character from Konami's Metal Gear franchise, created by Hideo Kojima. He was first introduced as the primary antagonist in the original Metal Gear Solid (1998), where he leads the rogue unit FOXHOUND and the genetically modified Next-Generation Special Forces in a hostile takeover of a nuclear disposal facility in Alaska. It is revealed that he, as well as protagonist Solid Snake and Solidus Snake, is a product of Les Enfants Terribles, a top-secret government project to artificially create soldiers by cloning the legendary soldier Big Boss. Despite piloting the mecha Metal Gear REX at the end, Solid Snake manages to subdue Liquid before the latter dies of the FOXDIE virus that the former contracted. Though Liquid is dead, his arm is transplanted onto Revolver Ocelot, which seemingly caused him to adopt Liquid's personality in later installments. The character returns in Metal Gear Solid V: The Phantom Pain as a child mercenary named Eli, also known as the White Mamba.

Liquid was designed by artist Yoji Shinkawa, and is primarily voiced by Cam Clarke in English and Banjō Ginga in Japanese. The character has received a positive reception from critics and journalists, with many praising his characterization, plot twists, and his relationship with Solid Snake. He has been frequently ranked among the greatest video game villains of all time.

== Concept and design ==
Series creator Hideo Kojima stated that he created the name of Liquid Snake from the idea that he and Solid Snake are polar opposites as protagonist and antagonist respectively, yet are mutually clones of Big Boss; thus they represent two opposite states of matter (solid and liquid) yet carry the same surname of Snake.

Liquid Snake is almost identical to Solid Snake in terms of facial appearance and physique, with the only difference between them being Liquid's darker skin tone and medium-length blond hair. He has a tattoo of a snake entwined around a sword on his left arm, with concept art also showing a small piercing on his left ear and dog tags around his neck. For most of Metal Gear Solid, Liquid is dressed in a brown trenchcoat but fights shirtless when he confronts Snake at the end of the game. When he disguises himself as Master Miller, he ties his hair in a ponytail and wears a pair of sunglasses, changing the tone of his voice as well. In Metal Gear Solid 2, when Liquid possesses Ocelot, his physical appearance changes as well, exposing the surgically attached right arm and letting his hair loose.

Eli in Metal Gear Solid V wears a wardrobe similar to his older self, consisting of a green jacket with no shirt and shorts. The back of his jacket has a drawing of a pig with an eye patch meant to resemble Big Boss and the phrase "Never Be Game Over" atop of it. Underneath the pig, the kanji 液体人間 (ekitai ningen), which means "liquid person", can be seen. He carries in his belt a conch, a reference to the novel Lord of the Flies.

In the original Metal Gear Solid, Liquid Snake was voiced by Banjō Ginga in the Japanese version and by Cam Clarke (credited as James Flinders in the PlayStation release) in the English version. Both actors would reprise the role in Metal Gear Solid 2. Stuntman Mark Musashi provided Liquid Snake's motion capture for Metal Gear Solid: The Twin Snakes. The character's young version in Metal Gear Solid V was voiced by Piers Stubbs, who also provided facial capture, while his motion capture was performed by Vincent Giry. Yūtarō Honjō dubbed the character's voice for the Japanese version.

== Appearances ==
=== Metal Gear Solid ===
Liquid Snake was raised in the United Kingdom following his birth, and served as an operative for the British SAS and later became the field commander of FOXHOUND during Metal Gear Solid, leading Revolver Ocelot, Psycho Mantis, Sniper Wolf, Vulcan Raven, Decoy Octopus and the Next-Generation Special Forces, also known as Genome Soldiers. He leads the hostile takeover of Shadow Moses Island, Alaska to acquire Big Boss's remains and use his genetic information to treat the mutations affecting his subordinates, the Genome Army.

Deployed to neutralize his units, protagonist Solid Snake first meets Liquid after he is taken captive by the enemy and imprisoned in a medical room. The two battle each other multiple times throughout the story. Initially, Liquid tries to kill Snake by piloting a Hind D attack helicopter and pursuing him across the Communication Towers, but Snake destroys the helicopter with anti-air Stinger missiles. Afterward, it is unveiled that prior to the operation, Liquid killed and disguised himself as a close ally of Snake, Master Miller. Through this, Liquid was able to manipulate Snake into gaining his trust and subsequently activate Metal Gear REX for him, a mecha capable of delivering nuclear warheads anywhere in the world, under the ruse that it would be deactivated. Liquid explains his strong resentment towards Snake; it is revealed that they are both clones of Big Boss created by the U.S government's top secret Les Enfants Terribles cloning program, but he mistakenly believes that Snake's inherited dominant genes make him superior, while he was given the recessive genes that he interprets as flawed; in reality, it is Liquid's recessive genes that are superior.

As Liquid takes control of REX, Snake manages to destroy it with the help of Gray Fox, whom Liquid kills in the process. Snake falls unconscious in the aftermath, which allows Liquid to take his brother to the top of REX's ruins and challenge to a fistfight. Snake prevails and knocks Liquid off, but he survives again and pursues Snake in a jeep chase that results in a crash outside the island's facility. Just as he approaches Snake, Liquid suddenly succumbs to the same FOXDIE virus that had also been injected into Snake. Liquid's death leaves Snake in doubt of his own survival, as FOXDIE targets victims based on specific DNA.

=== Metal Gear Solid 2: Sons of Liberty ===
Liquid's presence still had an influence. His right arm was transplanted posthumously as a replacement to Revolver Ocelot. This resulted in Liquid's voice and mannerisms to be utilized by Ocelot whenever Solid Snake is nearby, such as when his host is confronted by Snake during the hijacking of Metal Gear RAY from the disguised tanker. The rest of Liquid's body was being kept by an unspecified agency until being stolen by Hal Emmerich to fake Snake's death. Liquid's personality took over Ocelot once again during the climax of Solidus Snake's takeover of the Big Shell with the intent of rebelling against The Patriots. Liquid was the one to send Arsenal Gear crashing into Manhattan.

=== Metal Gear Solid 4: Guns of the Patriots ===
Liquid's consciousness seemingly takes over his host's body as Liquid Ocelot. However, Liquid's personality is ultimately revealed to be an elaborate facade by Ocelot made possible through a process of self-hypnosis, in order to trick the Patriots' AIs. The rest of Liquid's remains were used as spare body parts for Big Boss's restoration.

=== Metal Gear Solid V ===
Liquid Snake's next official appearance is in a prequel. The youth is a 12-year-old child soldier named Eli (イーライ, Īrai) who fled from his home in England after learning about his nature as a clone. He becomes an active mercenary in the Angola-Zaire border region in Central Africa where he sets up his own mercenary unit consisting entirely of children, nicknamed the White Mamba (ホワイトマンバ, Howaito Manba) or "Nyoka ya Mpembe" due to being the only white child soldier in the region.

Venom Snake first encounters Eli in Masa Village after it is taken over by Eli's group. After being subdued, he is taken into Mother Base where the Diamond Dogs staff try to re-educate him and integrate him into normal society along with the other child soldiers. However, Eli resists this treatment and rebels against the Mother Base staff, focusing his hostility on Venom Snake, whom he believes to be his biological father (unaware of Venom Snake's true identity as Big Boss's decoy).

When Eli sneaks into a chopper during Snake's deployment to OKB Zero in Kabul, he catches the attention of the young psychic known as the Third Child, who uses Eli's will to activate Sahelanthropus and attack Snake. After Sahelanthropus is neutralized and transferred to Mother Base, the Third Child infiltrates the place and befriends Eli, giving him a vial containing the English strain of Skull Face's vocal cord parasite. The two plot out an elaborate escape plan which involves helping other child soldiers escape and fixing Sahelanthropus with the assistance of its creator Dr. Emmerich. Ultimately, Eli succeeds in reactivating Sahelanthropus and hijacks the Metal Gear from Mother Base, escaping alongside the Third Child and the other child mercenaries.

"Kingdom of the Flies" shows Snake pursuing Eli's group in an unnamed African island surrounded by saltwater, where the English strain of the vocal cord parasite has been spread to prevent access to adults. Snake confronts Eli and a battle ensues between Sahelanthropus and a battalion of Diamond Dogs soldiers. Eli is defeated but Snake is forced to abandon him when he displays signs of infections, as Eli has lost his immunity to the parasites as a result of undergoing puberty. Before Eli can die, the Third Child arrives and uses his psychic powers to remove the parasite within him. The two youths escape just as Diamond Dogs launches a Napalm airstrike to cleanse the island of the parasites. An image of the Manhattan skyline is seen while Eli vows revenge.

== Reception ==
In 1999, readers of GameSpot voted Liquid Snake into the list of top ten video game villains. IGN included him in their 2011 list of top 100 video game villains, as number 53. He was ranked as the 16th-coolest video game villain by Complex in 2012. GameDaily ranked him ninth on their "Top 25 Evil Masterminds of All Time". Liquid ranked first on IGN's 2008 list of the Metal Gear series' top ten villains, also placing as seventh on their list of top ten Metal Gear boss battles. Play ranked Liquid Snake the fifth-best Metal Gear character, adding he "has become one of the most iconic villains of the franchise and is still one of its most popular characters."

Liquid was included on GamesRadar+ 2008 list of "outrageously camp bad guys" at fifth place, also giving honourable mention on their list of "mega plot twists you never saw coming" to finding out Master Miller is actually Liquid Snake. In 2011, UGO Networks ranked Liquid as the fourth-scariest fictional terrorist in entertainment, also featuring him revealing himself in Metal Gear Solid on the list of the most shocking twists in gaming. In 2012, GamesRadar+ featured both him and Solidus Snake at second place on the list of most evil clones in gaming, commenting that "as evil clones go, the ones that threaten the world with thermonuclear war and eradication rank as some of the worst," and also listing him and Solid Snake as having one of the best brotherly rivalries in gaming. IGN also remarked their rivalry, saying "Few rivalries in games have spanned as massive and confusing a timeline as Solid Snake and Liquid Snake".
