= Kazuyuki Sogabe =

Japanese actor

- 曽我部 和恭
- Born: April 16, 1948; Funabashi, Chiba Prefecture, Japan
- Died: September 17, 2006 (aged 58)
- Occupations: Actor; voice actor; musician; narrator
- Years active: 1973–2000
- Agent: Aoni Production

Kazuyuki Sogabe (曽我部 和恭 (formerly 曽我部 和行) Sogabe Kazuyuki, April 16, 1948 – September 17, 2006) was a Japanese actor, voice actor, musician and narrator. During his life, he has been attached to Theatre Echo; he was attached to Aoni Production at the time of his death. He also served as guitarist of the band Slapstick, which he formed in 1977 with fellow voice actors Tōru Furuya and Toshio Furukawa.

In December 2000, Sogabe retired from voice acting when he felt a weakness in his own voice. After his retirement, his ongoing roles were replaced by other voice actors. He died on September 17, 2006, from esophageal cancer, with which he had been diagnosed two months before. He was 58 years old.

== Filmography ==
=== Television animation ===
1970s

- Hurricane Polymar (1974) (Takeshi Yoroi/Hurricane Polymar)
- 3000 Leagues in Search of Mother (1976) (Tonio Rossi)
- Dokaben (1976) (Live Announcer)
- Chōdenji Machine Voltes V (1977) (Ippei Mine)
- Tōshō Daimos (1978) (Kyōshirō Yūzuki)
- Anne of Green Gables (1979) (Minister Alan)
- Mobile Suit Gundam (1979) (Gene, Commander Wakkein)

1980s

- Fang of the Sun Dougram (1981) (J. Locke)
- Patalliro! (1982) (Jack Bancoran)
- Aura Battler Dunbine (1983) (Bishot Hate)
- Mirai Keisatsu Urashiman (1983) (Young Führer)
- Attacker You! (1984) (Shingo Mitamura)
- Fist of the North Star (1986) (Huey)
- Anmitsu Hime: From Amakara Castle (1986) (Kuni)
- Tales of Little Women (1987) (Anthony Boone)
- Saint Seiya (1988) (Gemini Saga, Gemini Kanon)

1990s

- Chibi Maruko-chan (1990) (Yamazaki)
- Dragon Ball Z: Bardock – The Father of Goku (1990) (Toma)
- Genki Bakuhatsu Ganbaruger (1992) (Yaminorius III)
- Sailor Moon (1992) (Kunzite)
- Yu Yu Hakusho (1993) (Gama, Suzuki)
- Dragon Ball Z (1995) (South Kaiōshin)
- Dragon Ball GT (1996) (Redict, Dr. Mu)
- The King of Braves GaoGaiGar (1997) (Minoru Inubōzaki)
- Lost Universe (1998) (Gorunova)
- Turn A Gundam (1999) (Miran Rex)
- One Piece (1999) (Ben Beckman, Silvers Rayleigh)

2000s

- Crayon Shin-chan (2000) (James)

=== Original video animation (OVA) ===
- Vampire Hunter D (1985) (Rei Ginsei)
- Bubblegum Crisis (1987) (Largo)
- Metal Skin Panic MADOX-01 (1987) (1st Lt. Kilgore)
- Legend of the Galactic Heroes (1989) (Christian)

=== Theatrical animation ===
- Cyborg 009 (1980) (Cyborg 008)
- Mobile Suit Gundam (1981) (Commander Wakkein)
- Crusher Joe (1983) (Kirī)
- Royal Space Force: The Wings of Honneamise (1987) (Marty)
- Mobile Suit Gundam: Char's Counterattack (1988) (Lyle)
- Dragon Ball Z: Super Android 13! (1992) (Artificial Human No. 13)

=== Tokusatsu ===
- Saru No Gundan (1974) (Urrii)
- Kamen Rider Amazon (1974) (Bee Beastman (ep 15))
- Skyrider (1979) (Riderman (ep 54))
- Kamen Rider Super-1 (1980) (Hasaminblood (ep 36))
- Kamen Rider Super-1 Movie (1981) (Kamen Rider X)
- Choudenshi Bioman (1984) (New Intellect Brain (Anchor Canth Brain))

=== Video games ===
- Super Robot Wars series (1996–2006) (Gene, Bishot Hate)
- Metal Gear Solid (1998) (Psycho Mantis)
- Tatsunoko Fight (2000) (Hurricane Polymar)
- Metal Gear Solid 4: Guns of the Patriots (2008) (Psycho Mantis)

=== Dubbing roles ===
- The Beatles (Ringo Starr)
- A Bridge Too Far (J.O.E. Vandeleur)
- Cyborg (Gibson Rickenbacker (Jean-Claude Van Damme)
- Death Warrant (Louis Burke)
- Doctor Who (Cyber Leader)
- Double Impact (Alex Wagner/Chad Wagner)
- Dune (Duncan Idaho)
- The Fury (Robin)
- Lionheart (1993 TV Tokyo edition) (Lyon Gaultier (Jean-Claude Van Damme))
- Miller's Crossing (Bernie Bernbaum (John Turturro))
- Platoon (1989 TV Asahi edition) (Sanderson)
- Police Story 2 (Superintendent Raymond Li (Lam Kwok-Hung))
- The Silence of the Lambs (1995 TV Asahi edition) (Buffalo Bill (Ted Levine))
- Top Gun (1989 Fuji TV edition) (Bill "Cougar" Cortell (John Stockwell))
- West Side Story (1979 TBS edition) (Indio (Gus Trikonis), Mouthpiece (Harvey Evans))
