= Revolver Ocelot =

Fictional character from the Metal Gear series

- Metal Gear character
- Revolver Ocelot from Metal Gear Solid V: The Phantom Pain (2015)
- First game: Metal Gear Solid (1998)
- Created by: Hideo Kojima
- Designed by: Yoji Shinkawa
- Voiced by: English: Patric Zimmerman (Metal Gear Solid, Metal Gear Solid 2: Sons of Liberty, Metal Gear Solid: The Twin Snakes, Metal Gear Solid: Digital Graphic Novel, Metal Gear Solid 2: Digital Graphic Novel and Metal Gear Solid 4: Guns of the Patriots); Josh Keaton (Metal Gear Solid 3: Snake Eater and Metal Gear Solid: Portable Ops); Troy Baker (Metal Gear Solid V: The Phantom Pain); Japanese: Kōji Totani (Metal Gear Solid and Metal Gear Solid 2); Takumi Yamazaki (Metal Gear Solid 3 and Metal Gear Solid: Portable Ops); Ikuya Sawaki (Metal Gear Solid: Digital Graphic Novel and Metal Gear Solid 2: Bande Dessinee); Banjō Ginga (Metal Gear Solid 4); Satoshi Mikami (Metal Gear Solid V)
- Motion capture: Various: Taro Kazanawa (Metal Gear Solid 3; regular action) Kenichi Yoshida (Metal Gear Solid 3; gun action) Bill Yokoyama (Metal Gear Solid 3; gun action) Troy Baker (Metal Gear Solid V; facial) Matthew Carlsen (Metal Gear Solid V; body)

Revolver "Shalashaska" Ocelot (known in his youth as Major Adamska "ADAM" Ocelot) is a fictional character and a major antagonist of Konami's Metal Gear series, created by Hideo Kojima. Throughout the series, he takes on a variety of roles while often operating as a triple-agent: a major adversary of Solid Snake, a friendly rival and later close ally to Big Boss, the right-hand man to Liquid Snake and Solidus Snake, and an ally to Venom Snake.

Ocelot has been well-received by video game publications for his role as a central villain in the franchise, and has often been considered one of its most important characters for his connections with various characters.

== Conception and design ==
Introduced in Metal Gear Solid, Ocelot is normally clothed in a duster, spurs, and gunbelts, the traditional garb of gunslingers in spaghetti westerns, as well as a black armband on his left arm, and wields the Colt Single Action Army revolver, which he refers to as "the greatest handgun ever made". In designing the character, Hideo Kojima wanted to add Western tones to a character resulting in Ocelot's appearance, which is based on that of veteran Western film actor Lee Van Cleef. For Metal Gear Solid 2, Yoji Shinkawa originally intended to give Ocelot a cybernetic arm in place of the one Gray Fox took from him, but this idea was not used as the staff intended to have Ocelot use the arm of Liquid Snake. While Kojima acknowledged fans finding the idea of Liquid's arm possessing Ocelot's mind ridiculous, he promised to answer the reason behind it in Metal Gear Solid 4.

== Appearances ==
Revolver Ocelot (リボルバー・オセロット, Riborubā Oserotto) is introduced in the video game Metal Gear Solid as a gunslinger-themed member of the FOXHOUND terrorists involved with the hostile revolt on Shadow Moses Island which housed Metal Gear REX, serving as the team's interrogation expert and their leader Liquid Snake's right-hand man. He challenges Solid Snake to a gunfight in the game's first boss-encounter, but their fight ends with Ocelot losing his right hand from an encounter with the Cyborg Ninja. Despite his loss, Ocelot later appears to torture Snake after Snake is captured. During Snake's torture, Ocelot reveals he was originally from the former Soviet Union and a former member of Spetsnaz, secretly wishing for Liquid's and Big Boss's dream world as well. Ocelot is the sole surviving member of FOXHOUND by the game's end. After the ending credits, it is revealed that he is in league with the U.S. President George Sears.

Revolver Ocelot, now known as Shalashaska (シャラシャーシカ, Sharashāshika), returns in the sequel Metal Gear Solid 2: Sons of Liberty. He gains a new, surgically attached right-arm that originally belonged to Liquid, resulting in a dormant personality which takes over Ocelot's mind whenever Solid Snake is nearby. During the game's introductory Tanker Chapter, he is seemingly under Sergei Gurlukovich's employ, but ends up betraying his old friend when Ocelot hijacks Metal Gear RAY, framing Snake and Otacon for the deed. During the game's main Plant Chapter, Ocelot then forms part of the terrorist group "Sons of Liberty" with Solidus Snake but ends up betraying the former President as well after revealing his true allegiance to the Patriots, a group that controls the United States. Shortly afterwards, Ocelot is taken over by Liquid and escapes from Snake, Solidus, and Raiden to kill the Patriots' leaders.

A young version of the character, known as Major Ocelot (オセロット少佐, Oserotto Shōsa), is featured in the prequel Metal Gear Solid 3: Snake Eater (set four decades before the original Metal Gear Solid). He is a GRU Major under Colonel Volgin's command and the leader of his own "Ocelot Unit" within GRU. His encounters with Naked Snake are why he acquires a preference for revolvers (due to a tendency to absorb the gun's recoil with his elbow being more suited to shooting revolvers). Throughout the game, Ocelot's constant challenges with Snake eventually turn into a friendly rivalry. He is revealed to be Adamska (アダムスカ, Adamusuka), The Boss's illegitimate child. After the deaths of Volgin and The Boss, Ocelot is revealed to be a triple agent, taking orders from the Philosophers and the KGB, while also receiving orders from the Director of Central Intelligence. He was supposed to intercept and assist Snake; a mission he failed when another agent of the Philosophers, EVA, got there first.

The young version of Ocelot, also known as ADAM (アダム, ADAMU), plays a minor (yet significant) role in the direct sequel Metal Gear Solid: Portable Ops. Initially in league with FOX's insurgency leader Gene, Ocelot assassinates the DCI in order to "end" the Philosophers before being invited to join the Philosophers' reorganized American branch.

Metal Gear Solid 4: Guns of the Patriots (set directly after Metal Gear Solid and Metal Gear Solid 2) features the character as Liquid Ocelot (リキッド・オセロット, Rikiddo Oserotto) as the primary antagonist. He deliberately uses self-hypnosis and nano-machines to act as Liquid's mental doppelgänger to trick the Patriots' AIs. As "Liquid", Ocelot establishes a parent company that runs the five largest PMCs, fighting for the Patriots' control over the world. After hijacking the Patriots' systems, Ocelot's PMCs engage Old Snake. After Snake and Otacon use Naomi Hunter's FOXALIVE virus to delete the Patriots' AIs, Ocelot challenges Snake to a fistfight and appears to die from exhaustion after the final fight; however, Ocelot's death was actually caused by the new FOXDIE strain that Drebin injected into Snake.

The character canonically appears in Metal Gear Solid V: The Phantom Pain. He assists Venom Snake and the Diamond Dogs, playing a key role in facilitating Zero's deception by subjecting both himself and Snake to hypnosis to cover it up and aiding Big Boss's and Snake's escape from XOF in Cyprus. Ocelot acts as the Diamond Dogs' interrogator, frequently clashing with Kazuhira Miller over matters involving Skull Face and the White Mamba. Ocelot ultimately declares his support for Big Boss's covert war, foreshadowing his involvement in later Metal Gear Solid games.

In the original Metal Gear Solid, Revolver Ocelot was voiced by Kōji Totani in the Japanese version and Pat Zimmerman (credited as Patric Laine in the PlayStation release) in the English version. Both actors would reprise the role in Metal Gear Solid 2. The character's young version in Metal Gear Solid 3 was voiced by Takumi Yamazaki for the Japanese version and Josh Keaton in the English version. Due to Koji Totani's death in 2006, the character was voiced by Banjō Ginga in Metal Gear Solid 4 and Ikuya Sawaki in the Metal Gear Solid: Digital Graphic Novel recreations while Pat Zimmerman continued the role in the English version. In Metal Gear Solid V, the character was voiced by Troy Baker in the English version while Satoshi Mikami dubbed the character's voice for the Japanese version. Over the years, the character's motion capture has been performed by Taro Kazanawa, Kenichi Yoshida, Bill Yokoyama, Troy Baker, and Matthew Carlsen.

== Critical reception ==
The character of Revolver Ocelot has received a positive response by video game publications based on his role as an antagonist. He is "one of the only characters to have a major role in all five Metal Gear Solid titles" by Game Informer. Ocelot has been frequently featured in the lists of best Metal Gear villains. He has been called one of the best Metal Gear Solid boss battles, and second on the top list of Metal Gear villains, with GameSpot callling him one of the most important characters from the story alongside Solid Snake and Big Boss.

The torture he makes in Metal Gear Solid was listed by GameSpy as one of the best moments from the game due to how Ocelot toys with Snake and how difficult it is to pass it besides how significant is the outcome for the rest of the game. In response to his role in Metal Gear Solid 3, GameSpy called Ocelot one of the "series mainstay", hoping he would become an entertaining opponent. Official U.S. PlayStation Magazine called Revolver Ocelot underrated in comparison to Final Fantasy VII iconic antagonist Sephiroth, describing Ocelot as an appealing villain already in his youth explored in Snake Eater.

According to Edge magazine, with Liquid Ocelot "Kojima has forged a superb villain" than in his previous appearances. He was also listed by IGN as one of the fictional characters who required his own spin-off. GamesRadar also praised his role as Revolver/Liquid Ocelot. Ocelot's change to his Liquid Ocelot alter-ego persona of Liquid Snake was opined by GameSpy to be one of the most nonsensical events from the Metal Gear series, but they still praised his action scenes at the start of Metal Gear Solid 2. UGO.com speculated that, because of being born from the medium The Sorrow, Ocelot could communicate with dead people which ended in Liquid Snake taking possession of his body. GamePro described the final fight against Liquid Ocelot as "epic" even as he became "a punching bag" in the final phase. Furthermore, UGO.com listed this fight, owing to the fighting styles employed and the interaction between the two fighters. On the other hand, 1UP.com listed such fight in their article about the 13 "most dumbass" boss battles for its simple style in comparison to other more challenging bosses from Metal Gear Solid 3 and its excessive length for a hand-to-hand fight between two old people. 1UP.com also listed the scenes from the games in which Liquid Ocelot controls the PMC's weapons to attack the protagonists and his imitation of Liquid Snake's death from Metal Gear Solid as one of the most surprising moments in the game. Guinness World Records Gamer's Edition acclaimed Ocelot as one of the best villains in gaming.

VentureBeat were bemused by Ocelot's portrayal in Metal Gear Solid V, writing how he was "calm and the voice of reason" instead of being an "eccentric, sadistic man". They theorized, however, that Ocelot was merely being himself and showing his true allegiances with Big Boss, rather than working as a triple agent or being under self-hypnosis akin to his previous appearances.
