= Big Boss (Metal Gear) =

Fictional character from the Metal Gear series

- Metal Gear character
- Big Boss/Naked Snake in Metal Gear Solid Delta: Snake Eater (2025)
- First appearance: Metal Gear (1987)
- Created by: Hideo Kojima
- Designed by: Yoji Shinkawa
- Voiced by: English: David Hayter (MGS3, Portable Ops, Peace Walker, and Super Bomberman R); Richard Doyle (MGS4); Kiefer Sutherland (Ground Zeroes and The Phantom Pain); Japanese: Akio Ōtsuka (MGS3, Portable Ops, Peace Walker, MGSV, and Super Bomberman R); Chikao Ōtsuka (MGS4)
- Motion capture: Various: Mizuho Yoshida (MGS3); Akio Ōtsuka (MGS4); Miou Tanaka (Peace Walker); Erik Brown (MGSV); Kiefer Sutherland (facial capture, MGSV)

In-universe information
- Nationality: American

Big Boss (Note: Japanese: ビッグ・ボス, Hepburn: Biggu Bosu), also known as Naked Snake (Note: ネイキッド・スネーク, Neikiddo Sunēku) or simply Snake (Note: スネーク, Sunēku), is a character in Konami's Metal Gear, an action-adventure stealth game series created by Hideo Kojima. A major character in the franchise, he has appeared in almost every game in the series, often switching between being the protagonist and antagonist via his overreaching goal of creating a utopia for soldiers.

Big Boss is first introduced in the original Metal Gear (1987) as the commanding officer of Solid Snake and the American Special Forces group FOXHOUND, but his villainy as the secret leader of Outer Heaven is revealed in a plot twist and is seen in Metal Gear 2: Solid Snake (1990) as the leader of Zanzibar Land. Later installments established him to be the genetic father of Solid Snake, Liquid Snake, and Solidus Snake through a government cloning project, and he makes a final appearance in Metal Gear Solid 4: Guns of the Patriots (2008) to make amends with Solid Snake before his definitive death. The character is the protagonist of the prequel Metal Gear games, starring in Metal Gear Solid 3: Snake Eater (2004) as Naked Snake, an American special forces operator and decorated war hero. Political manipulations cause him to be disillusioned when facing his own mentor The Boss, and both him and Zero misinterpret The Boss's will differently. He comes at odds with Zero in Metal Gear Solid: Peace Walker (2010) and Metal Gear Solid V: Ground Zeroes (2014) as he forms various military groups and adopts the name of Big Boss while Metal Gear Solid V: The Phantom Pain (2015) featured a different character as a body double of Big Boss known as Venom Snake.

The concept of Naked Snake was an attempt to distance him from Solid Snake, despite both being physically similar through their characterizations. He has been voiced by Akio Ōtsuka and Chikao Ōtsuka in the Japanese version, and by David Hayter, Kiefer Sutherland and Richard Doyle in the English translation. Critical reception to Big Boss has been positive, due to his role as a villain and his relationship with Solid Snake. His younger persona has been praised as likeable, with critics generally enjoying the execution of his character development in the series designed to shape him into a villainous icon.

== Creation and design ==
In Metal Gear 2: Solid Snake, Big Boss's visual appearance was inspired by actor Sean Connery, but for the ports of the game's re-released version, the original design was replaced by Yoji Shinkawa's design. During the making of Metal Gear Solid 3: Snake Eater, Hideo Kojima asked Shinkawa to make Naked Snake similar to Solid Snake, but with the differences that unlike Solid Snake, Naked Snake was a rookie and thus acted more naive. Shinkawa stated having no difficulties in designing Naked Snake as basically a revised version of Solid Snake. As a result, Naked Snake is virtually identical to Solid Snake from the previous Metal Gear Solid games in terms of appearance. The love scene between Naked Snake and EVA was inspired by the first Pink Panther. Kojima and Shinkawa watched the movie but the former stated it might have come different from the original version. Since the game's trailers did not state that Naked Snake was Big Boss, Kojima often gave vague answers to the character's true identity. Although the ending of Metal Gear Solid 3 reveals Naked Snake was given the Big Boss title, Kojima stated "he's not really the Big Boss yet". With Metal Gear Solid: Peace Walker, he wanted to explain how Naked Snake turned into the man who appeared in the original Metal Gear games as Solid Snake's enemy.

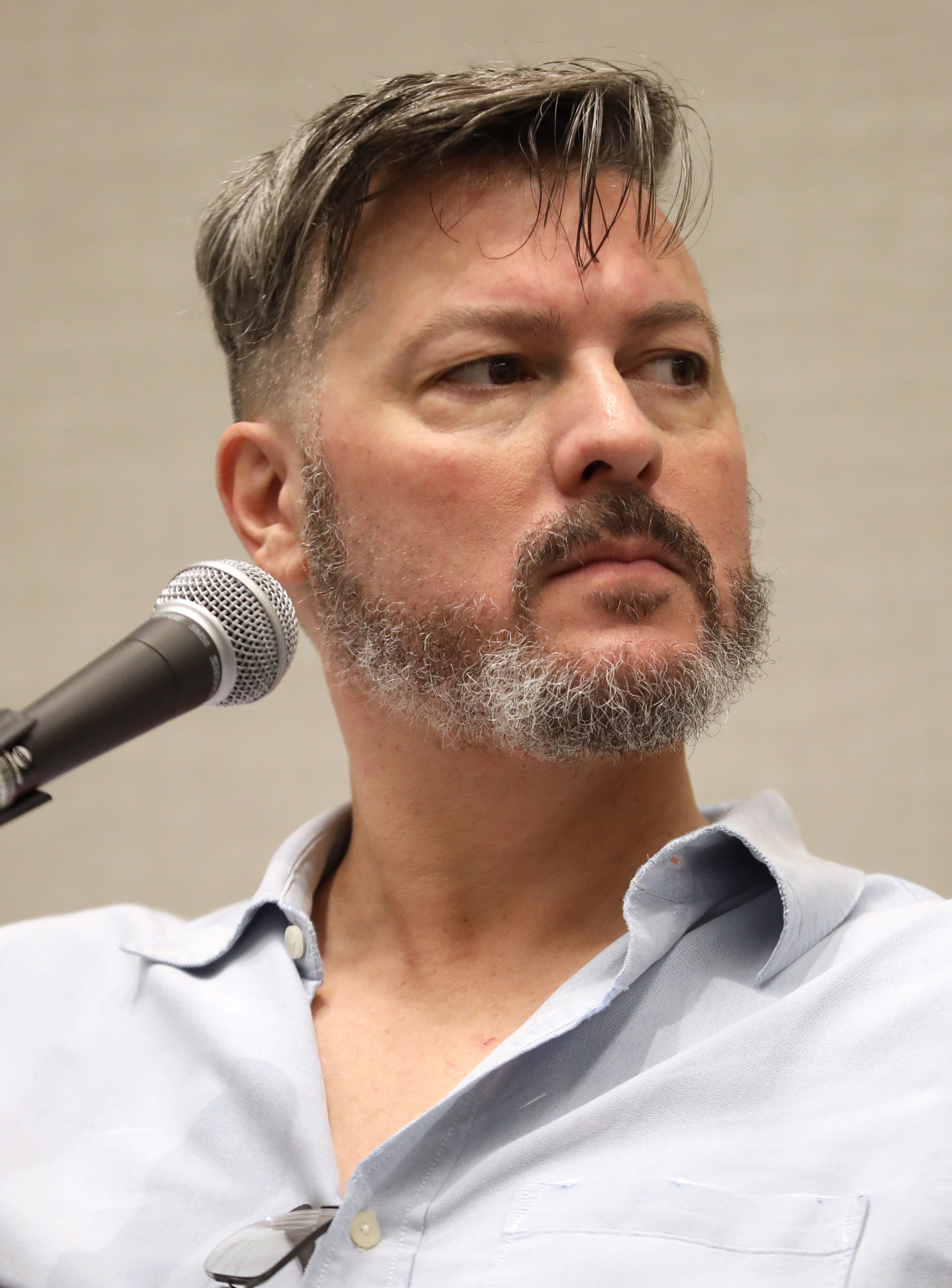
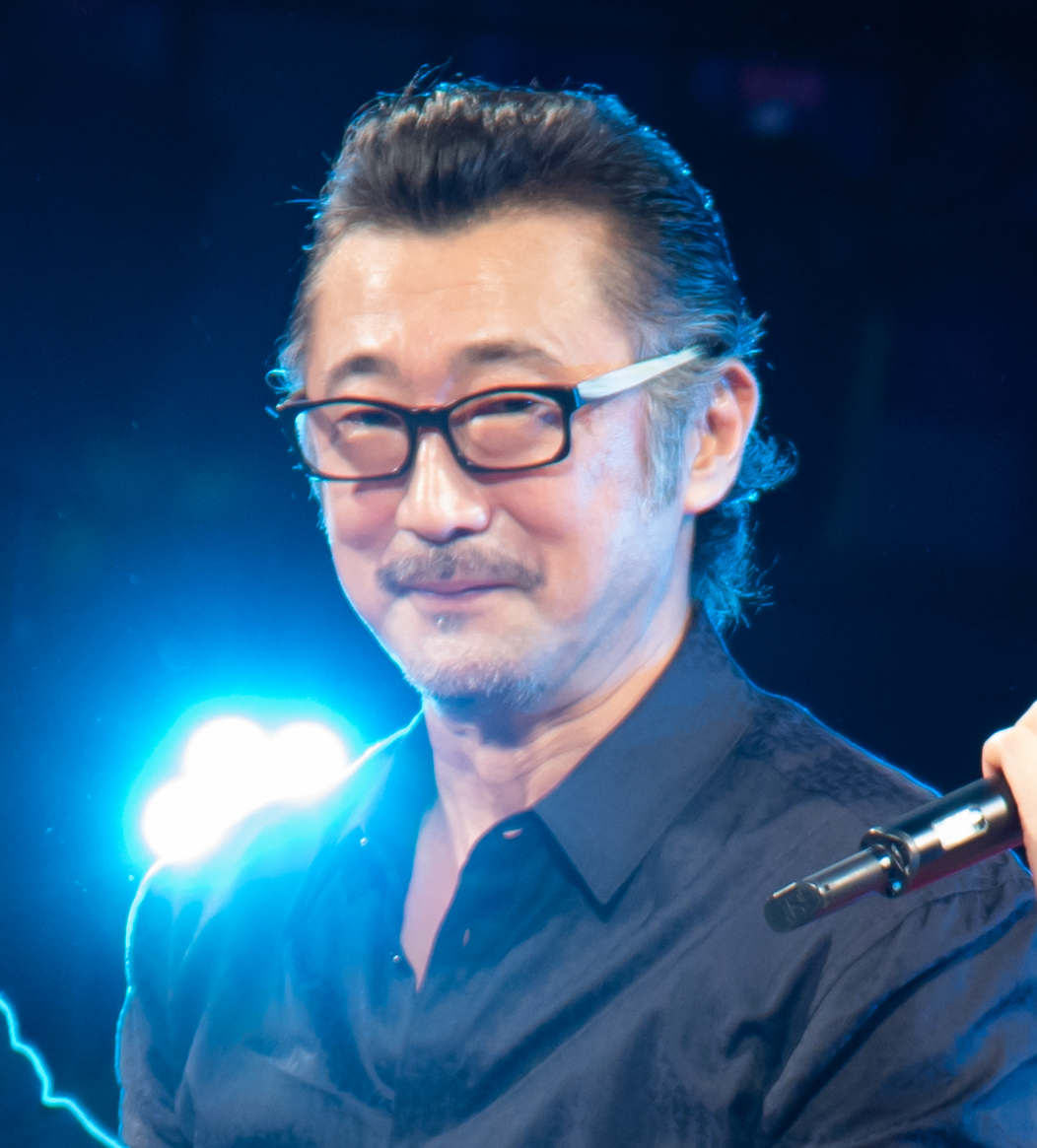
David Hayter (left) has voiced Big Boss's younger appearances in English, while Akio Otsuka (right) has voiced Big Boss's younger appearances in Japanese.

Naked Snake as portrayed in Metal Gear Solid 3 is voiced by Akio Otsuka in the Japanese version and David Hayter in the English version. Hayter, despite voicing protagonist Solid Snake in previous entries, was forced to re-audition in order to secure the part of Naked Snake. Hayter told Game Informer that Kojima had hoped to hire Kurt Russell to voice Naked Snake, but that Russell declined the role. Both actors would return to provide the character's voice in Portable Ops and Peace Walker. The elderly version of Big Boss who appears in Metal Gear Solid 4 was voiced by Chikao Otsuka (Akio Otsuka's real-life father) in Japanese and by Richard Doyle in English.

On June 6, 2013, during Konami's third annual pre-E3 show, it was announced that Kiefer Sutherland would be replacing Hayter as the character in Metal Gear Solid V: The Phantom Pain. Sutherland was assigned the role after a suggestion to Kojima from Hollywood producer and director Avi Arad; Kojima's reason was to "have a more subdued performance expressed through subtle facial movements and tone of voice rather than words", and that he "needed someone who could genuinely convey both the facial and vocal qualities of a man in his late 40s". Sutherland plays the original Big Boss (who serves as the playable character in the stand-alone prologue Metal Gear Solid V: Ground Zeroes), as well as Venom Snake (a new version of the character who serves as the protagonist in the main game The Phantom Pain). In addition to the voice, Sutherland also provided facial capture for the character. Akio Otsuka reprised his role, voicing the character again in both Ground Zeroes and The Phantom Pain, additionally portraying Venom Snake in the latter.

== Appearances ==
Big Boss is introduced in the original game Metal Gear as the Special Forces Unit FOXHOUND's leader and Solid Snake's commanding officer. He initially acts as a radio contact who provides Snake with information about mission objectives involving Outer Heaven, a mercenary nation in South Africa. After Snake destroys the TX-55 Metal Gear, the leader confronts Snake, acting as a twist villain (later retconned to be the doppelgänger of Big Boss) who is defeated and Outer Heaven is destroyed, (Note: Metal Gear Solid V: The Phantom Pain establishes that this individual is Venom Snake and not the original Big Boss.) but Big Boss vows revenge. Big Boss reappears in the sequel Metal Gear 2: Solid Snake, where he has taken control of Zanzibar Land, a fortified nation in Central Asia. Snake confronts Big Boss once again while escaping from Zanzibar Land's detention camp, with Snake incinerating Big Boss.

Big Boss is frequently mentioned in Metal Gear Solid and Metal Gear Solid 2: Sons of Liberty, which reveals that his DNA was used to create genetically-altered clones as part of the secret "Les Enfants Terribles" government project, with Solid Snake, Liquid Snake, and Solidus Snake.

The prequel Metal Gear Solid 3: Snake Eater depicts a younger incarnation of the character, under the codename of Naked Snake, as a member of the CIA special forces unit FOX headed by Major Zero. Snake is sent on assignment in the Soviet Union to thwart the uprising of GRU colonel Volgin, rescue weapons researcher Nikolai Sokolov, destroy the Shagohod prototype, and kill The Boss to avert a nuclear war while having a rivalry with Ocelot and receiving assistance from fellow spy EVA. Snake completes his mission and kills The Boss, but learns that the defection was orchestrated by the US government and who had ordered his mentor's death to prevent war. The political motives behind the operation do not sit well with him, especially after he is awarded the "Big Boss" title for his actions which he initially rejects, and prompts him to retire from active service.

In Metal Gear Solid: Portable Ops, he still operates under his former codename due to believing that he has yet to surpass The Boss as a warrior. Having spent six years wandering the globe, Snake finds himself involved in an armed uprising caused by Gene's rogue FOX unit in the San Hieronymo peninsula in Colombia and learns that he has been convicted for instigating the revolt. Hoping to clear his name, Snake forms his own team of specialists by recruiting both old allies and defecting enemy soldiers to his cause. He faces not only the members of the FOX unit, but also Metal Gear's first prototype. After he learns that The Boss's death had been planned all along, Snake eventually defeats Gene and obtains the funds for Army's Heaven.

Big Boss returns in Metal Gear Solid 4: Guns of the Patriots. He is revealed to be divided with Zero over how to realize The Boss's final will: a world where soldiers are free to choose and fight their own battles on their own terms, and not at the whim of a government. Big Boss gets discouraged by Zero interpreting the will as imposing order and control over the world, further despising his role as a figurehead since Zero's vision places no value on loyalty to ideals and people which The Boss treasured above all else. Big Boss ultimately leaves when he learns that his own DNA was used for the "Les Enfants Terribles" project, and later stages the coup d'état with Outer Heaven and Zanzibar Land against Zero's proxys. Big Boss survived and was placed in an artificially induced coma with his genetic code used for an ID recognition system, the use of which allows access to the AIs that make up the Patriots. His body is recovered and reconstructed using parts from the bodies of both Liquid and Solidus, and he awakens from his coma after the fall of the Patriots' AIs. Big Boss appears before Old Snake with the elderly catatonic Zero to reveal the truth about the Patriots, before shutting off Zero's life support system, killing his nemesis. He comes to terms with his feelings regarding The Boss, and reconciles with his son before dying from exposure to the new strain of FOXDIE virus.

Metal Gear Solid: Peace Walker establishes Naked Snake founded the mercenary force Militaires Sans Frontières with Kazuhira "Kaz" Miller. He intends to use MSF to live out The Boss's final will. Student Paz Ortega Andrade and Professor Vladimir Zadornov seek to hire MSF to remove Coldman's CIA Peace Sentinel unit that has established bases in Costa Rica. Snake reluctantly accepts the mission, to which the MSF takes over an offshore research platform in the Caribbean as a "Mother Base" in a bid to expand the group's capabilities. Snake comes to learn about the true purpose of Coldman's Peace Walker prototypes and accepts his Big Boss identity. Big Boss has Huey Emmerich create Metal Gear ZEKE as a weapon to defend his interests before Zadornov makes several escape attempts and is killed in self-defense while Paz takes control of ZEKE which Big Boss defeats and continues his operations with MSF. Metal Gear Solid V: Ground Zeroes sees Big Boss sent to rescue Paz and ally Chico from a U.S. Naval prison facility in Cuba, believing that Paz can be converted to MSF's cause to reveal more about Cipher (a precursor to the Patriots). Snake rescues Paz and Chico but the XOF paramilitary force led by Skull Face attacks Mother Base. A bomb secretly planted in Paz results in injuries which puts Big Boss in a coma. The Phantom Pain shows Big Boss awaken in Cyprus and works elsewhere on the true Outer Heaven's development.

=== Venom Snake ===
Venom Snake as he appears in promotional artwork for the series

Venom Snake, also known as Punished Snake, is a doppelgänger of Big Boss who most notably appears as the protagonist of Metal Gear Solid V: The Phantom Pain. He is originally a physician in Ground Zeroes, serving Big Boss as a medic in MSF until the helicopter explosion following the destruction of Mother Base. In the accident, he lost his left arm and suffered shrapnel injuries, including having a large protruding piece embedded in his cerebral cortex. While in a coma for nine years, Snake is subjected to subconscious brainwashing and facial reconstruction by Cipher in order to become a body double meant to draw attention away from the activities of the true Big Boss. Seeking revenge for his fallen comrades, Snake takes command of the mercenary unit Diamond Dogs with a new "Mother Base" near Seychelles. Snake engages in missions in Soviet-controlled Afghanistan and the Angola-Zaire border of Central Africa while recruiting several companions against Cipher's remnants before facing off against Skull Face and the White Mamba. Afterwards, he is retconned as Outer Heaven's mercenary leader featured in the first game in the series who fights and dies against Solid Snake.

=== Other video games and media ===
Big Boss appears in Snake's Revenge as the leader of the enemy organization. Having survived the injuries he sustained in the original game as a cyborg, he fights Solid Snake as a boss. Elements of Naked Snake inform the appearance of Solid Snake in Nintendo's Super Smash Bros. series, where his face is more closely modeled off the character's appearance in Snake Eater and Portable Ops, the latest games in the series at the time of the character's debut in Super Smash Bros. Brawl (2008). Naked Snake also appears as a Trophy in Brawl based off his Naked Camouflage in MGS3, and later as a spirit using his standard fatigues in Super Smash Bros. Ultimate (2018). Naked Snake also appears as a playable character in Super Bomberman R. Big Boss was stated to be an inspiration for characters in the 2020 film Monster Hunter. Naked Snake appears in a crossover event with the tactical shooter game Delta Force (2025).

== Reception ==
Big Boss has been well-received. Game publications described Big Boss as one of the best video game villains. Jesse Schedeen of IGN found the character one of the most important characters from the franchise to the point his "influence is felt in every Metal Gear game, even if he isn't always present in the flesh". Ken Gagne of Computerworld named Big Boss as one of the most creative villains in video games, citing the complexity and importance of his betrayal of Solid Snake in the original game. Naked Snake's transition to Big Boss was praised, especially in conjunction with his character development throughout the series. Various gaming sites such as 1UP.com, Game Informer and Kotaku placed his character as one of the worst fathers in video games due to his poor relationship with Solid Snake and the attempts to murder his own son. VG247 wrote that while Big Boss appeared identical to Solid Snake, the former was more vulnerable and fallible, and driven by personal ideals. They also compared Big Boss' villainous turn and relationship with Solid Snake to the character of Darth Vader.

The inclusion of Naked Snake's role in Metal Gear Solid 3 has also received praise from critics. Prior to the game's release, Naked Snake was often called 'Solid Snake' or simply 'Snake' by critics due to his resemblance with Solid Snake, although some still were not sure about his true identity. Benjamin Turner of GameSpy further noted that various fans started making theories about Naked Snake's identity before the game's release, as while they thought it was Solid Snake, the setting from the game made it impossible for Solid Snake to be the game's main protagonist due to their difference of years. Finding the revelation of Naked Snake's identity was considered by Benjamin Turner of GameSpy as "the single coolest thing Kojima could have done in MGS3" because of [Naked Snake's] differences from [Solid Snake] in regards to their personality as well as because it made fans wonder how Naked Snake would become the series antagonist Big Boss. Despite the similarities between Naked Snake and Solid Snake, Rich Stanton of Eurogamer praised how different they are from each other in terms of experience, particularly highlighting how Naked Snake looks after The Boss despite the game placing them as enemies. Dave Meikleham of GamesRadar+ placed his relationship with EVA in his top list of disastrous game romances due to how it was ruined by the two's different roles in the story. Play editor Nick Jones described Naked Snake's final fight against The Boss as the second best moment from the franchise, citing the emotional focus on their characters.

Joe Dodson, writing for Game Revolution, disliked Big Boss's character in Portable Ops due to his process of kidnapping and indoctrinating enemy soldiers through "confusing rants" about the idea of loyalty. Rob Fahey of Eurogamer found that Snake remained likeable due to carrying over traits shown in Snake Eater, and praised Hayter's performance. Charles Herold of The New York Times described him as a tragic character based on the events shown in Snake Eater, and with Portable Ops had been forced to face a new conflict despite retirement. Greg Kasavin of GameSpot praised the handling of the character in Portable Ops due to his interactions with his former partners from the FOX unit. Jeff Haynes of IGN noted how the game presented major plot twists and exposition that would affect his characterization and lay the groundwork for important items shown later in the series.

Oli Welsh of Eurogamer criticized Big Boss's characterization in Peace Walker as confusing in the wider context of the series, with mixed comments being given to Hayter's performance. Jonathan Holmes of Destructoid enjoyed how Peace Walker further developed Big Boss's character from Portable Ops by completing his journey from lone soldier to leader and cementing him as the series icon he would become. Greg Miller of IGN also found the game's story was one of the most enjoyable and least-convoluted by focusing purely on Big Boss's emotions and his quest to discover more about his fallen mentor, The Boss, similar sentiments of which were shared by Randy Nelson of Engadget. His characterization in Peace Walker drew parallels to Che Guevara.

Jason Schreier of Kotaku disliked the plot twist in The Phantom Pain which revealed that the player character Venom Snake was not Big Boss, feeling it cheapened the emotional crux of the story and failed to explain Big Boss's motivations for becoming a villain. GamesRadar+ writer David Roberts similarly cited that the reveal was a "strange" ending and "a bizarre bit of fridge logic that makes less and less sense the more I think about it," believing it to make the ending of the game feel hollow. However, he felt that the customization aspect of Venom Snake was "purely and distinctly Metal Gear". Conversely, Destructoid praised the reveal for its logic in the grander scheme of the series' timeline. Samuel Roberts of PC Gamer stated the twist left the player with "no backstory other than the one [they]'ve just created" which removed the character's identity of Big Boss, reflecting the player's own unique experience and being "a perfect thematic match for [the] game". The repetitive nature of the quest system in The Phantom Pain was highlighted by VICE writer Cameron Kunzelman as helping to show Big Boss's role as someone who simply does work rather than acting as a hero. Sutherland was praised for his performance, though the character of Venom Snake was criticized for his lack of dialogue.
