= Psycho Mantis =

Fictional character from Metal Gear Solid

- Metal Gear character
- Official artwork of Psycho Mantis as he appears in Metal Gear Solid
- First game: Metal Gear Solid (1998)
- Created by: Hideo Kojima
- Designed by: Yoji Shinkawa
- Voiced by: EN: Doug Stone; JA: Kazuyuki Sogabe

Psycho Mantis (Note: Japanese: サイコ・マンティス, Hepburn: Saiko Mantisu), also known as Tretij Rebenok, is a fictional boss character in Konami's Metal Gear video game series. Psycho Mantis first appears in Metal Gear Solid, where he helps main antagonist Liquid Snake in his attempt to capture Shadow Moses Island. In a battle with the game's protagonist, Solid Snake, Psycho Mantis uses his psychic powers to talk directly to the player of the game in a way that crosses the fourth wall of the game screen, playing tricks with the game's memory card and controller. Psycho Mantis goes on to reappear in several later games in the series. In English, he is voiced by Doug Stone, while in Japanese he is voiced by Kazuyuki Sogabe.

Game critics have praised Psycho Mantis and his fourth-wall-breaking interactions, calling the scene one of the most memorable moments in video games. Further commentary has analyzed the scene for its impact on the player's experience, including in the form of the player's relationship with the on-screen protagonist, Solid Snake.

== Appearances ==
Psycho Mantis is a psychic and an antagonist in the game Metal Gear Solid (1998). He appears halfway through the game in a dialog and battle sequence. Protagonist Solid Snake receives romantic advances from his ally Meryl Silverburgh, only to discover that she is being psychically controlled by Psycho Mantis. Snake is unfazed, and after knocking Meryl out, Psycho Mantis reveals himself. Psycho Mantis seeks to prove his psychic powers to Snake, and to do so, talks directly to the player of the game in a way that crosses the fourth wall of the game screen. He first reads Metal Gear Solid's metadata about the player's actions in order to make a judge of their personality, before then reading the system's memory card to read what other games the player is a fan of. Mantis will provide special responses if the memory card contains saves from other Konami titles, including Castlevania: Symphony of the Night, Suikoden, Azure Dreams, Vandal Hearts, Tokimeki Memorial and Policenauts. If the player has a DualShock vibrating controller, Mantis will instruct the player to place it on the ground, at which point he will activate the controller's rumble effect. He then causes the console to appear to disconnect before transitioning into battle, in which he can seemingly read all of the player's movements. Following advice from in-game hints, players can shift their controller from the first controller port to the second controller port, which will render Mantis unable to read their movements. Mantis is killed by Snake during the battle. Mantis fills a similar role in the game's remake, The Twin Snakes (2004), and will comment if the player's memory card contains game saves for Super Smash Bros. Melee, Super Mario Sunshine, The Legend of Zelda: The Wind Waker, or Eternal Darkness.

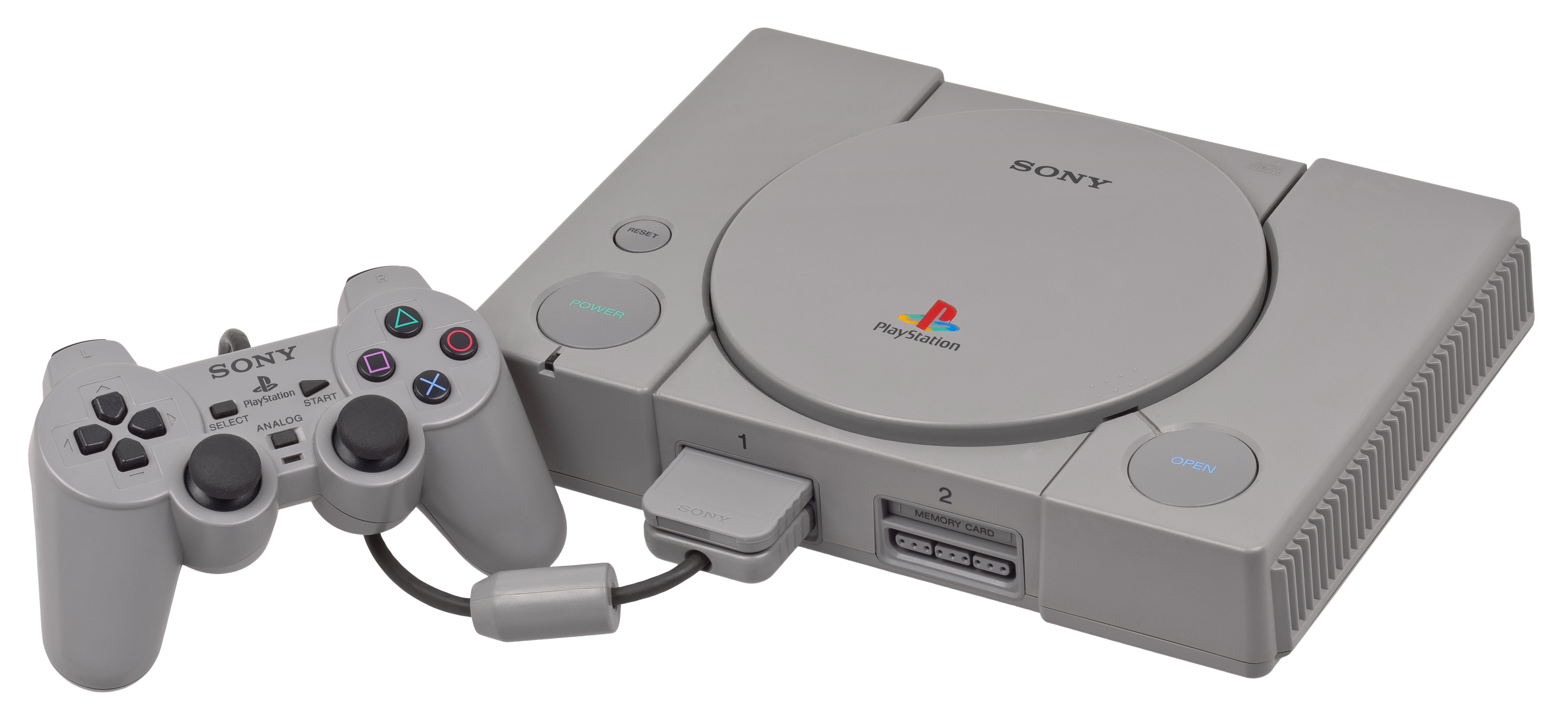
Psycho Mantis's boss fight could be defeated by switching controller ports on the PlayStation console, and he would additionally manipulate the DualShock controller in his introductory cutscene.

In-game dialogue reveals that Mantis's mother had died while giving birth to him. His father hated him as a result. Mantis discovers this while reading his father's mind, causing Mantis to burn his village to the ground out of fear. Mantis joined the KGB later in his life, and afterward joined the FBI, using his psychic powers to delve into the minds of suspected criminals. After delving too deep into the mind of a serial killer, Mantis went insane. According to Mantis, he joined with Liquid Snake, the game's main antagonist in order to "kill as many people as he could" as he had grown disgusted with the human race.

Mantis briefly re-appears in Metal Gear Solid 4: Guns of the Patriots, where his ghost appears to control the deceased body of the boss enemy Screaming Mantis. Mantis tries to repeat the same display of his powers from Metal Gear Solid, but fails due to the PlayStation 3's lack of memory card. If the player is using a DualShock vibrating controller, he will become excited by the fact he is still able to manipulate the controller. Psycho Mantis later appears as a cameo in Metal Gear Solid V: Ground Zeroes.

A younger version of Psycho Mantis appears in Metal Gear Solid V: The Phantom Pain, where he is a child referred to as the Third Child (Russian: Третий Ребенок, romanized: Tretij Rebenok). He is manipulated by the game's main antagonist, Skull Face, who uses the Third Child to control a Metal Gear mech with the goal of killing all English-speaking people in the world. The Third Child is later influenced by the rage of protagonist Venom Snake's ally, Eli, who earns the Third Child's allegiance. This allows Eli to gain control over the mecha.

An advertisement for the Ford Focus aired in 2016, which parodied the scene where Mantis reads Snake's mind. Psycho Mantis's English voice actor, Doug Stone, reprised his role as Mantis for the commercial. A statuette of Psycho Mantis was also released in 2018. Psycho Mantis additionally made a cameo appearance in the 2024 game Astro Bot.

== Development ==
Metal Gear series designer Hideo Kojima was inspired to create Psycho Mantis after watching the 1978 film The Fury, leading the team use the film's depiction of psychic power as a reference. Kojima stated that when developing Mantis, he wished to harness the concept of masters telling their students to clear their minds. The only method he could think of to reflect this was to switch the controller ports, which was controversial among younger members of the team. Mantis was designed by character artist Yoji Shinkawa. Psycho Mantis has been portrayed in voice by Doug Stone in English and by Kazuyuki Sogabe in Japanese.

Later adaptations of the game had to re-imagine interactions with Psycho Mantis that were designed for the PlayStation hardware. In PC ports of the game, the player must use the keyboard to trick Mantis, while later PlayStation console ports require players to go to the settings and switch their controller connection to Player 2. In the novelization of the game, the boss fight is adapted into a series of hallucinations where Snake reckons with deeper realizations about his character. The comic adaptation of the game had Mantis appear on a cliffhanger, threatening to use his powers to make Meryl shoot herself, before seemingly being defeated by Snake's ally Master Miller. Miller is revealed to be an illusion of Mantis's, and Snake proceeds to defeat Mantis in battle. Additionally, in Metal Gear Solid Master Collection Vol.1, which contains an emulation of Metal Gear Solid, an option exists to allow players to curate their save data, allowing them to select what games Mantis will reference during his boss battle.

== Reception and analysis ==
=== Critical reception ===
Despite Psycho Mantis's brief appearance in Metal Gear Solid, his role in the game has been consistently received as one of the most iconic and celebrated scenes in video games. In the book 100 Greatest Video Game Characters, Nicholas David Bowman described how Psycho Mantis's boss battle crosses into direct engagement with the player, explaining that "Rarely has a game character violated so many assumptions about the rules of engagement—stretching the conflict from the television screen to the player's own mind." In IGN's ranking of gaming's greatest villains, the publication stated that Mantis "attacked players on all fronts", with his manipulation of Meryl preying on the feelings players developed for her at that point in the game. A Brief History of Video Games noted how breaking the fourth wall was both varied and unique, making the battle "a bravura performance rather than a mere novelty" Hideo Kojima later stated that Psycho Mantis was his favorite character in the series. Filmmaker and director Guillermo del Toro additionally praised the Psycho Mantis scene for being able to transcend the video game medium.

Andy Kelly of TheGamer praised the character as part of what made Metal Gear Solid so iconic, describing how the Mantis battle utilized the video game medium in unique and inventive ways. Manon Hume of Game Informer also praised the battle as inventive, describing how it makes the player question their control over the game. Brendan Main of The Escapist posited that Mantis's ability to unnerve the player with their save data was an experience that was not replicable outside of Metal Gear Solid itself. This caused an uncertainty in the minds of players about their ability to properly control the game, and further emphasized how decisions in the game were made by the will of the player, and not that of protagonist Solid Snake. Mantis's ability to influence the framework of the game was described by the book Once Upon a Pixel: Storytelling and Worldbuilding in Video Games as amplifying the tension of the encounter. The book Metagames: Games About Games highlighted how Psycho Mantis became far more powerful by breaking the fourth wall, using his control over the player's input to make them feel more vulnerable. Chad Concelmo of Destructoid stated that Psycho Mantis's manipulation of the fourth wall was revolutionary for the time and was able to maintain its weight even long after the game's release, more than other scenes with greater emotional weight. His dissonance from other bosses in the game was highlighted by the book 50 Years of Boss Fights: Video Game Legends, as unlike prior bosses, players had to think outside of the box in order to defeat Psycho Mantis.

=== Analysis ===
Psycho Mantis's ability to directly interact with players received significant analysis. The book The Encyclopedia of Computer Graphics and Games analyzed how Psycho Mantis's ability to dodge controller inputs exploited the player's comfort with the game, describing how it "defamiliarizes players" from the game's controls and mechanics. The book Hideo Kojima: Progressive Game Design describes how the Mantis boss sequence gave the game developers control beyond just the game, but also to the video game medium itself. His self-awareness was additionally described by the book Framing Uncertainty: Computer Game Epistemologies as allowing Mantis to cross a "border" between the game's world and the real world, causing a deep level of uncertainty in players. The book Once Upon a Pixel: Storytelling and Worldbuilding in Video Games additionally stated that this ability made Mantis more terrifying as an opponent. The International Journal of Transmedia Literacy analyzed how Psycho Mantis shifts his attention from Snake to the player, emphasizing the player's importance in the game narrative, and requiring them to take action in the real world in order to save the game's protagonist.

Once Upon a Pixel: Storytelling and Worldbuilding in Video Games described how the sequence was able to remind players of the fact that the world of Metal Gear Solid was in a video game, and that while they controlled Snake, they themselves would never amount to actually being Snake. This created conflicting feelings of identification and alienation, with Mantis's actions pushing the player out of the normal game flow they were experiencing as Snake. The book Performativity in Art, Literature, and Videogames also described a "feedback loop" caused by the player's involvement with Psycho Mantis's fourth-wall breaking, stating that the battle caused confusion between "human physiological processes and computational processes". Other academics additionally noted the metanarrative impact of the boss sequence, describing how it made the game more immersive by requiring the player to interact directly with the game console.
