= Metal Gear (video game) =

1987 video game

- Japanese MSX2 cover art
- Developer: Konami
- Publisher: Konami: NA: Ultra Games (NES, C64, DOS)
- Designer: Hideo Kojima
- Programmers: Hiroyuki Fukui; Tomonori Otsuka; Koji Toyohara
- Artists: Masami Tabata; Azusa Fujimoto
- Composers: Iku Mizutani; Shigehiro Takenouchi; Motoaki Furukawa
- Series: Metal Gear
- Platform: MSX2
- Release: July 13, 1987: MSX2; JP: July 13, 1987; EU: July 1987 Famicom/NES; JP: December 22, 1987; NA: June 1988; PAL: 1989 Commodore 64; NA: 1989; EU: 1990 MS-DOS; NA: August 30, 1990; EU: 1990 Mobile phone; JP: August 18, 2004; NA: 2008 Windows; WW: September 25, 2020
- Genres: Action-adventure, stealth
- Mode: Single-player

Metal Gear (Note: Japanese: メタルギア, Hepburn: Metaru Gia) is a 1987 action-adventure stealth game developed and published by Konami for the MSX2. Originally released in Japan and parts of Europe in July 1987, it is the first game in the Metal Gear series and the first video game developed by Hideo Kojima. Players control Solid Snake, an operative of the U.S. special forces unit FOXHOUND, who is sent on a solo infiltration mission into the fortified state of Outer Heaven to destroy Metal Gear, a bipedal mecha capable of launching nuclear missiles to anywhere in the world, as well as rescue a number of fellow agents who have been taken hostage by the enemy.

Initially envisioned as a pure action game, Metal Gear was reworked under Kojima to focus on avoiding enemies, contrary to the then-popular shoot 'em up genre, with an emphasis on evasion similar to Pac-Man (1980). Numerous weapons and items are used in the game, including a portable radio transceiver used to convey dialogue and the narrative. A port of the game was later released internationally for the Famicom/NES; this version was developed without Kojima's involvement and features many changes, including drastically altered level designs.

The MSX2 version of Metal Gear was released to positive reception, with praise directed towards the gameplay and graphics, while the Famicom/NES version received mixed reviews. The game was a commercial success, with the MSX2 version being a best-seller and the NES version selling 1 million units in the United States. Metal Gear is retrospectively recognized as the first mainstream stealth game, and is credited as a pioneer in stealth mechanics and complex storytelling via the radio transceiver. A direct sequel made by Kojima, Metal Gear 2: Solid Snake, and a sequel to the NES port, Snake's Revenge, were released in 1990. The MSX2 version was ported with a revised translation and additional gameplay features in Metal Gear Solid 3: Subsistence (2005), and this version was re-released along with the NES version as part of the Metal Gear Solid: Master Collection Vol. 1 (2023).

== Gameplay ==
Solid Snake avoiding a visual encounter with enemy soldiers (MSX2 version)

Metal Gear is a two-dimensional stealth game, played from a flip-screen overhead perspective. The player controls a military operative codenamed Solid Snake, whose objective is to infiltrate the base of Outer Heaven while avoiding visual contact and direct confrontation with enemies. Snake starts the game unarmed; he must obtain equipment by exploring the base, including weapons like a handgun and rocket launcher, ammunition caches, rations for replenishing the player's life gauge, and specialized equipment like a gas mask. The main enemies faced by the player are guards, who follow set patrol patterns and have a straight line of sight in front of them, in total looking in four directions. Snake can use his weapons or fists to defeat patrolling enemies. Doing this with without alerting anyone will occasionally make the guard drop a single unit of rations or ammo that can be picked up. In addition to enemy guards, the player will be confronted by mercenaries who will challenge the player to combat, serving as the boss characters.

If the player is in the line of sight of an enemy, the game enters the "Alert Mode". In this situation, guards will run towards Snake and fire their weapons at him. Snake must escape from the enemy's sight in order to resume infiltration. The method of escaping varies depending on the circumstances behind discovery: If Snake is typically seen by a guard, a single exclamation mark appears over their head, meaning only the enemies in the player's present screen will attack and Snake can escape by simply moving to an adjacent screen. However, if Snake is spotted by a camera, sensor, or fires an unsupressed gunshot/explosion, two exclamation marks will appear over enemies and reinforcements from off-screen will appear as well. Snake can only escape by eliminating all incoming enemies, going outdoors, entering an elevator, or entering a boss battle.

The enemy base consists of three different buildings, with multiple floors (including basement levels) within them. The player uses key cards and other items to unlock doors and explore new areas. Each door will only open with a corresponding key card. Information can be obtained by rescuing hostages being held within the buildings. After rescuing five hostages, the player's rank will increase by one star (with the maximum rank being four stars), allowing for increased carrying capacity and maximum health. However, if a hostage is killed, the player will be demoted to the previous rank.

A radio transceiver is available for Snake to keep in touch with his commanding officer, Big Boss, or one of the resistance members operating covertly near Outer Heaven (Schneider, Diane, and Jennifer). Each of Snake's allies specializes in a specific subject and will usually provide information or advice based on the player's current area, although a reply is not always guaranteed. The player must keep track of each character's frequency number in order to remain in contact with them throughout the game.

The MSX2 version requires the use of a tape drive (such as the Sony Bitcorder) in order to save and load game progress from checkpoints. A Game Master II cartridge can also be used to enable save states via floppy disks at any point. Versions on later platforms eliminated these complicated requirements thanks to standardized storage devices such as memory cards and internal disk drives.

== Plot ==
=== Setting ===
Metal Gear takes place in 1995, which is not defined in the Japanese MSX2 version of the game, and referred to the year as "19XX", the release of Metal Gear Solid established the date within its narrative. The game forms the first entry in an overarching plot concerning the character of Solid Snake, with the origins of the game's plot being later explored in 2015's Metal Gear Solid V: The Phantom Pain.

=== Characters ===
The player's character is Solid Snake, a rookie member of the special forces group FOXHOUND sent on his first mission. He is assisted via radio by his commanding officer Big Boss, who offers information about mission objectives and items. Snake can also contact people in a local resistance movement composed of leader Schneider, a former architect who guides Snake through the layout of the fortress and knows the locations of key items; Diane, a former positive punk vocalist who provides information on enemy forces and mercenaries from her home; and Jennifer, who infiltrated Outer Heaven's medical staff to find her missing brother and assists Snake as an inside agent once he gains a high rank. Among the prisoners Snake rescues are Grey Fox (Note: Later referred to as Gray Fox), a FOXHOUND agent who was captured during a previous mission; Dr. Pettrovich (Note: Dr. Drago Pettrovich Madnar in later releases), a robotic engineer who is working for Outer Heaven against his will; and the doctor's daughter, Elen (Note: Ellen in later versions), who was kidnapped by the enemy to coerce her father into developing Metal Gear.

The bosses include Shoot Gunner (Note: Renamed Shotmaker in later versions), a former Spetsnaz agent specializing in the riot gun; Machinegun Kid, a former SAS operative armed with a machine gun; Fire Trooper, a former GSG 9 operative who uses a flamethrower; Coward Duck (Dirty Duck in later releases), a boomerang throwing terrorist who shields himself with hostages; Arnold (Bloody Brad in later releases), two TX-11 class androids designed by Dr. Pettrovich; and the legendary mercenary who founded Outer Heaven, whose true identity is unknown until the end.

=== Story ===
The West discovers that a weapon of mass destruction is being constructed inside Outer Heaven, a fortified state founded by a "legendary mercenary" 200 km north of Galzburg, South Africa. The special forces unit FOXHOUND sends top agent Gray Fox to infiltrate the fortress, assess the situation and neutralize the threat. FOXHOUND loses contact with Gray Fox a few days later, with his last transmission being "Metal Gear...". FOXHOUND commander Big Boss sends his newest recruit, Solid Snake, into the area in an operation codenamed "Intrude N313", with orders to establish contact with Gray Fox and destroy Metal Gear.

Upon insertion into Outer Heaven, Snake makes contact with local resistance members Schneider, Diane, and Jennifer. Using all of his skills and the equipment he procures on site, he manages to rescue Fox. Fox explains that Metal Gear is the codename of a nuclear-equipped bipedal mecha, which can engage in all forms of combat and launch nuclear weapons to any location. Outer Heaven plans to use Metal Gear to impose itself as the new world superpower.

To destroy Metal Gear and topple the Outer Heaven mercenaries, Snake rescues Dr. Pettrovich, the lead engineer of Metal Gear, and his daughter Elen. The doctor explains how Metal Gear can be destroyed using weak points on its legs, and Snake takes on Outer Heaven's troops. However, he begins to notice that the traps put in his way are too precise and wonders how information on his activities is being tracked. Big Boss begins to act strangely, giving misleading advice that leads Snake into several traps, and eventually ordering him to abort the mission by telling the player to turn off the system. Moreover, Schneider is ambushed by hostiles and is presumed dead after losing contact with Snake.

Snake penetrates Outer Heaven's main base and takes out Metal Gear before it reaches completion. As a result, a self-destruct sequence for the compound begins. As he escapes the compound's basement, he is confronted by the mercenary leader of Outer Heaven, who turns out to be Big Boss. (Note: The 2015 prequel Metal Gear Solid V: The Phantom Pain reveals that the commander was not the real Big Boss but actually his body double, Venom Snake.) The corrupt leader reveals that he had been using his connections to steal military intelligence, establish his own mercenary force, and fund his activities. He had the rookie Snake sent in, hoping to have him captured and feed misinformation to authorities but underestimated his capabilities. Snake defeats Big Boss in the last battle and escapes the Outer Heaven compound as it crumbles in flames behind him. After the end credits, a message from Big Boss is displayed saying that he will meet Solid Snake again.

== Development ==
Director Hideo Kojima did not work on the game initially; he was asked to take over the project from a senior associate. Metal Gear was originally intended to be a simple action game that featured modern military combat. However, the MSX2's hardware limited the number of on-screen bullets and enemies, which Kojima felt impeded the combat aspect. The MSX2 also had limited scrolling capabilities, which made it difficult to produce a smooth scrolling shooter, like Konami's arcade hit Scramble (1981).

Inspired by The Great Escape, Kojima reversed the focus of the gameplay from shooting enemies to avoiding capture. The game design was no longer about shooting but about "trying to form the tension of hide and seek" according to Kojima, subverting the shoot 'em up genre popular at the time. Kojima designed the game so that, when Snake is discovered, the gameplay changed to become a puzzle video game "like Pac-Man" (1980) where the enemy guards behave like Pac-Man ghosts that Snake needs to avoid.

Kojima also came up with the idea of the player having access to a portable radio transceiver, which was used to organically enhance the storytelling through dialogue. According to Kojima, it allowed "you to send and receive comms" and the "game moves along with the player, so when the drama happens when the player" is not present, "the player's current situation can be depicted while the other characters' story or situation can be foreshadowed in parallel" simultaneously.

The game was titled Intruder during the early planning stages. The packaging illustration used for the retail releases of the game, drawn by Akira Nishimura (a freelance artist who drawn the key artwork for other Konami titles such as Gradius, Castlevania and the Japanese version of Contra), depicts the protagonist Solid Snake holding a gun right next to the titular Metal Gear weapon itself. Snake's pose was inspired by a publicity still of Michael Biehn posing as his character Kyle Reese from the 1984 film The Terminator. Kojima, who was still newly employed at Konami at the time, had no involvement with the production of this illustration.

== Releases ==
=== MSX2 ===
Metal Gear was originally released on the MSX2 home computer in Japan on July 13, 1987, with an English version released in Europe during the same year. Due to memory constraints, the Japanese version was written entirely in katakana (with character names presented in Roman letters), while the English version is written entirely in uppercase, has numerous instances of erroneous grammar and misspellings, and features fewer radio calls than the Japanese version (with 56% of the calls kept) and shortened messages.

The MSX2 Metal Gear would be released as a Virtual Console download for the Wii in Japan on December 8, 2009. The ROM used for this emulated re-release has been modified to bring it more in line with the later versions of the game released for other platforms.

=== Famicom / NES ===
The level designs were altered for the NES version, which includes an extensive outdoor sequence prior to reaching the first building.

A port of Metal Gear for the Family Computer (or Famicom) was released in Japan on December 22, 1987. This was followed by an English localization for the Nintendo Entertainment System (or NES) released in North America in June 1988 (published by Konami's Ultra Games division) and in Europe and Australia sometime in 1989. This was the first version of Metal Gear that was released in North America, since the MSX2 platform was never released in that market.

According to Kojima, the port was developed by another Konami division at Tokyo which was given the source code from the MSX2 version without the consent of the original team. Many changes were made during the porting process that later led to this version being publicly disowned by Kojima years after its release. Masahiro Ueno, who worked as a programmer for the NES version, has stated that the staff who worked on the port were given a three-month deadline and were ordered to make the port as different as possible from the MSX2 version. Due to hardware limitations with the mapper used, the Metal Gear boss ended up being replaced by a Supercomputer guarded by four enemy soldiers.

Another big change made to the game was in the level designs. Instead of the underwater infiltration from the MSX2 version, the NES version starts the game with Solid Snake parachuting into the middle of a jungle alongside three other soldiers (who are never seen nor mentioned after the intro). After landing in the jungle, the player must reach a transport truck at the end that will take Snake to the entrance of the first building. The player can use other transport trucks to reach the entrances of the other buildings quicker, since they travel in a cyclical pattern. The basement floors of Building 1 and 2 in the MSX2 version were made into separate buildings, Building 4 and 5 respectively, which are only reachable by going through one of two jungle mazes located in the outdoor areas between the other three buildings. The correct path to take in the jungle maze is never revealed in the game. In addition to the removal of the Metal Gear tank, the Hind D boss on the rooftop of Building 1 was replaced by a pair of armed turret gunners called "Twin Shot". The NES version lacks the higher alert phase from the MSX2 version and the jetpack-wearing soldiers on the rooftops of Building 1 and 2 lost their ability to fly (making them act more like regular guards). On the other hand, enemies no longer drop ammo nor rations when punched to death. Much like the MSX2 version, the English localization of the NES versions contains numerous instances of erroneous grammar, such as "Contact missing our Grey Fox", "Uh-Oh! The truck have started to move!", and "I feel asleep!!"

Passcodes are used in this version to save progress. When Snake is killed by the enemy or loses his life by certain other means, the player is given a choice to continue the game from the last checkpoint or quit and resume later with the given passcode. The passcode keeps track of Snake's rank (which determines his checkpoint in this version), inventory, hostages rescued, bosses defeated and certain event flags. One particular passcode featured in the Japanese and North American version, in which the player types the expletive "fuck me" and fills the remaining spaces with "1", will transport the player to the final battle with no equipment. This resulted in the passcode system being altered for the European versions of the game, with all of the vowels being removed.

Because the MSX2 version was not released in North America at the time, the NES version was the one that served as the basis for a couple of home computer ports released by Ultra Games in 1990 for the Commodore 64 and MS-DOS. The Commodore 64 version was released in 1989, and the MS-DOS version in 1990. A conversion for the Amiga, based on the NES version, was also announced, but never released. An unofficial Amiga port of the MSX2 version developed by a hobbyist programmer was made public in May 2021.

An emulated port of the Famicom version was also included in a bonus disc packaged alongside Metal Gear Solid: The Twin Snakes in a limited edition GameCube console bundle released in Japan.

=== Later releases ===
On August 18, 2004, Konami released a port of the MSX2 Metal Gear for feature phones through their Konami Net DX service in Japan as a promotional tie-in for Metal Gear Solid 3: Snake Eater. This updated port served as the basis for the version included on the second disc of Subsistence (the expanded edition of Metal Gear Solid 3) for the PlayStation 2 released in 2005, and later in the HD Edition released for the PlayStation 3 and Xbox 360 in 2011 and for PlayStation Vita in 2012. In 2020, a standalone version of the port was released on PC through the storefront GOG.com.

The HD Edition version of Metal Gear was re-released as part of Metal Gear Solid: The Legacy Collection for PlayStation 3. Ports of both the MSX2 and NES Metal Gear versions were also included with Metal Gear Solid: Master Collection Vol. 1 for the Nintendo Switch, PlayStation 4, PlayStation 5, Windows, and Xbox Series X/S.

== Reception ==
The MSX2 version of Metal Gear was ranked on MSX Magazine's top 20 best selling MSX games in Japan for five months, debuting at no. 4 on the October 1987 issue and peaking at no. 3 the following month. The NES version was a major international success, selling 1 million units in the United States. It was the second top-selling game in the United States during October 1988, just below Super Mario Bros. 2, and remained in the top ten through early 1989.

The Games Machine gave a positive review of the MSX version, giving the game a 79% score. They stated that the "initial impression of disdain at this non too-impressively animated macho man may rapidly change on delving deeper." They praised the graphics and the size of the game area, underlining the fact that it ensured "the action and suspense never wanes". They also wrote that the game was rapidly addictive, and that "the urge to get further into the game is quite strong". They concluded positively on the quality of the game, saying that if "this standard of Konami software is maintained then maybe more people will think hard about joining the other 200,000 MSX owners". They noted that there was no information regarding the game's Japanese author at the time, but stated that "whoever they may be they certainly seem to know their business."

Famitsu rated the Famicom version 24 out of 40 in 1988, and 3 out of 5 stars in 1989. Game Players reviewed the NES and Commodore versions, stating Metal Gear "out-Rambos" Rambo and is a "fearsomely challenging" game that "takes place in an elaborate maze-like setting and has plenty of room for strategy as well as stamina." They listed it among the top 100 best games of all time in 1989. Computer Gaming World also reviewed the NES version, praising its "strong concept" but stating it was "something less than a total success". They called the graphics "acceptable" and praised how it requires the "player to acquire newer, deadlier technology through the course of a game" but criticized the control system and the player's great vulnerability when unarmed at the start of the game. They nonetheless stated that Metal Gear "shows great promise for future Ultra Games entries" as it "attempts to move beyond the standard run/jump/shoot format" of most NES games, concluding the game to be "a potential super-hit that, unfortunately, is sabotaged by its own weaknesses".

The NES version of Metal Gear was ranked the 104th best game made on a Nintendo System in Nintendo Power's Top 200 Games list. GamesRadar ranked it the sixth-best NES game ever made, and the staff felt that it popularized its genre. In 1997 Electronic Gaming Monthly named the NES version the 35th best console video game of all time, citing "how you have to think like a spy to win, which means you don't always have to fight." Game Informer placed the game 53rd on their top 100 video games of all time praising the game's stealth aspects and dramatic plot.

== Legacy ==
Its success led to the creation of two separately produced sequels; the first one, Snake's Revenge, was produced specifically for the NES in North America and Europe in 1990 and the other, Metal Gear 2: Solid Snake, was the sequel developed by Hideo Kojima and released in Japan for the MSX2 during the same year as a response to the former's creation. The latter was followed by Metal Gear Solid for the PlayStation in 1998, which was in turn followed by numerous sequels and spinoffs in Metal Gear series.

The intro theme ("Operation Intrude N313"), main theme ("Theme of Tara") and game over theme ("Just Another Dead Soldier") from the MSX2 version were reused for the VR Training theme in Metal Gear Solid, which in turn was reused in Metal Gear: Ghost Babel and Metal Gear Solid 2: Substance. "Theme of Tara" is one of the tunes that can be heard in the "Shadow Moses Island" stage in Super Smash Bros. Brawl for the Wii, the music for the beginning section of the Battleship Halberd Interior stage of the Adventure mode, where Snake officially enters the storyline, and can also be selected as music with an iPod item in Metal Gear Solid 4: Guns of the Patriots.

Metal Gear is recognized as the first mainstream stealth game, and is credited as a pioneer in stealth mechanics as well as storytelling via a portable radio transceiver. Splinter Cell and Far Cry 2 designer Clint Hocking stated that every stealth-action game "owes its existence to the success of Metal Gear" and that, "Without Metal Gear, there would be no stealth games." Unreal and Gears of War creator Cliff Bleszinski cited the military themes and action gameplay of Metal Gear as a major influence on his work, and he named Gears of War in homage to Metal Gear. Tenchu creator Takuma Endo also cited Metal Gear as an influence.

=== Related media ===
In 1988, Konami published a gamebook adaptation of Metal Gear in Japan as the second installment in their Konami Gamebook Series. The gamebook is set two years after the events of the game, in which Solid Snake is called back into action after FOXHOUND receives intelligence on a terrorist group who have obtained the plans for Metal Gear and are now mass-producing the mech. The book portrays Solid Snake as an unsuccessful illustrator in his personal life outside his job as a FOXHOUND agent.

In 1990, a novelization of Metal Gear was published in the U.S. by Scholastic Books as part of their Worlds of Power series of novelizations based on third-party NES games. The Metal Gear book was written by Alexander Frost under the pen name F.X. Nine, the same pen name used for all the authors in the Worlds of Power series. This book adheres much more closely to the localized version of the backstory as presented in the North American packaging and manual, as opposed to the actual in-game plot which was not changed to reflect this difference. Big Boss is not featured in the book, but instead, two different characters, Commander South and Colonel Vermon CaTaffy, serve as Solid Snake's commanding officer and Outer Heaven's leader respectively. The book also gives Solid Snake the identity of Justin Halley and changes the name of his organization from FOX HOUND to the Snake Men. Because the book was targeted at young kids, the cover illustration was altered, with Snake's handgun being airbrushed out.

== Remake attempts ==
=== Official ===
During a public Q&A event conducted at London with Geoff Keighley on March 13, 2014, series' creator Hideo Kojima expressed interest in developing remakes of the MSX2 Metal Gear games in order to reconcile plot discrepancies that have since been introduced into the series, but had no plans at the time due to the ongoing development of Metal Gear Solid V: The Phantom Pain (itself a prequel set before the events of the original Metal Gear). However, Kojima has since departed from Konami following the release of The Phantom Pain, leaving the possibility of such remakes in question.

=== Unofficial ===
A Metal Gear remake mod for Alien Swarm was in development that was granted permission by Konami to use copyrighted material with the agreement that they don't make a profit from the recreation or accept donations for the production. It was canceled on June 3, 2014. David Hayter was set to voice Solid Snake.
