= Konami Game Master =

Game Master
- European cover artwork for the Konami Game Master
- Developer: Konami
- Platform: MSX
- Release: 1986
- Genre: Cheat device
- Mode: Single player

The Game Master (Japanese: コナミのゲームを10倍楽しむカートリッジ, Hepburn: Konami no Gēmu o Jū-bai Tanoshimu Kātorijji; lit. "The Cartridge That Makes Konami Games Ten Times More Enjoyable") is a utility cartridge released by Konami on December 12, 1985 in Japan and Europe. It is meant to be used in conjunction with Konami's own MSX game cartridges, allowing users to select their stages, adjust the number of lives, save progress and high scores, make screen dumps, and play in slow motion, among other uses.

An updated model called Konami's New Ten Times Cartridge (コナミの新10倍カートリッジ, Konami no Shin Jū-bai Kātoriji) was released on February 18, 1988. This new version adds support for MSX2 games and features a battery backup that allows users to save data via S-RAM from compatible games (such as Metal Gear 2: Solid Snake). Even though Konami's New Ten Times Cartridge was released exclusively in Japan, if the Japanese cartridge is put into a European MSX or MSX2 system it will show up in English with the title Game Master II.

== See also ==
- Game Genie
- GameShark
