= Metal Gear (mecha) =

Fictional weapon

- Metal Gear vehicle
- An illustration depicting mass-produced versions of Metal Gear REX on the battlefield.
- First appearance: Metal Gear (1987)
- Last appearance: Metal Gear Solid V: The Phantom Pain (2015)
- Created by: Hideo Kojima

General characteristics
- Class: Mecha

Metal Gears (Japanese: メタルギア, Hepburn: Metaru Gia) are the mecha in the Metal Gear series. In the series, a Metal Gear is a bipedal, nuclear weapons-equipped tank. The Metal Gears are typically autonomous nuclear launch platforms which the player must destroy to save the world and complete the game. Often, confronting the latest Metal Gear model is one of the final challenges of each game.

== Concept and creation ==
Hideo Kojima said that the idea of the "Metal Gear" weapon, a nuclear-capable walking tank, was conceived in response to the nuclear war hysteria during the 1980s that resulted from the Cold War as the U.S. military had no mobile land-based nuclear weapons delivery system at the time.

However, in reality this was not the case as the U.S. had significant amounts of various mobile, land based nuclear delivery systems since at least the early 1950s. In fact the start of the 1980s alone saw the deployment of two separate mobile systems that would make up the bulk of America's land-based nuclear component in Europe: the Pershing II and the BGM-109G Ground Launched Cruise Missile.

== In video games ==
The Metal Gear weapon has been consistently described as an all-terrain, nuclear-equipped, walking battle tank capable of launching a nuclear warhead from anywhere on the planet. In the original Metal Gear, the Outer Heaven fortified military state attempts to achieve military dominance over the West and East through the use of the TX-55 Metal Gear model built by Eastern scientist Dr. Drago Pettrovich Madnar after being forced against his will. In Metal Gear 2: Solid Snake, another hostile nation Zanzibar Land uses improved model Metal Gear D (also built by Dr. Madnar albeit willingly this time) to raid nuclear disposal sites.

Metal Gear Solid features a new model Metal Gear REX designed by Dr. Hal Emmerich after being misled into believing that Metal Gear would be used as an anti-nuclear device that would be capable of safely shooting down nuclear missiles via a railgun system that shoots nuclear warheads. The weapon was produced by the U.S. Army on Shadow Moses Island, Alaska. The proliferation of Metal Gear-like weapons led to the creation of the Marines' Metal Gear RAY before the events of Metal Gear Solid 2: Sons of Liberty.

Metal Gear Solid 3: Snake Eater reveals that Metal Gear's design originates with Soviet weapons designer Dr. Aleksandr Leonovitch Granin comparing the concept to the theory of the missing link between apes and men, evidenced by two design drawings (Metal Gear REX and Metal Gear D) on his desk, with him calling it the missing link between infantry and artillery. Infantry can go anywhere but are easily destroyed and carry limited firepower. Artillery can inflict and sustain far more damage, but are at the mercy of terrain. In short, for a tank to be perfect, it needs legs. Early Metal Gear models are also seen thanks to Dr. Granin's colleagues in direct sequels; Metal Gear Solid: Portable Ops features the quadrupedal design Intercontinental Ballistic Metal Gear by Dr. Nikolai Stepanovich Sokolov and Metal Gear Solid: Peace Walker features the first bipedal design Metal Gear ZEKE by Dr. Huey Emmerich.

== Models in the canonical series ==
=== Metal Gear ===
A comparison of Metal Gear designs from the early MSX2 games. From left to right: Metal Gear D (Metal Gear 2), Metal Gear (Metal Gear), Mk. II (Snatcher), and Petit (SD Snatcher).

TX-55 Metal Gear is the Metal Gear model's designation in the original Metal Gear game, although it is simply referred as "Metal Gear" and no particular meaning is given behind this codename. Within Outer Heaven, Solid Snake learns Metal Gear's weakness after rescuing creator Dr. Pettrovich (Dr. Madnar in later versions of the game) and his daughter Ellen. The player must place a certain number of plastic explosives on Metal Gear's feet in the order stated by Dr. Pettrovich. Metal Gear is stored in the 100th basement floor of the third building, inside a room guarded by two laser cams and never actually becomes operational; the final challenge is instead a battle with Outer Heaven's mystery leader and a race against time to escape the self-destructing base.

The Revised Metal Gear D is the more advanced Metal Gear model featured in Metal Gear 2: Solid Snake. Metal Gear D is equipped with a Vulcan cannon and a six-missile pod. The improved model was also built by Dr. Pettrovich, willingly this time after his radical ideas were rejected by the Western scientific community. The Metal Gear is piloted by Gray Fox and can only be destroyed by Solid Snake throwing grenades over its feet. This Metal Gear's mecha design was chosen through an internal contest between Konami's development staff, with the primary criterion being realism. The final design is credited to Tomohiro Nishio, who also built the Metal Gear model that was used in magazine advertisements, which was repurposed from a certain retail resin kit.

The titular Metal Gear itself never actually appears in the NES conversion of the original Metal Gear - in its place the player must blow up a Supercomputer that controls its activities guarded by four enemy soldiers. Otherwise, the final battle plays out the same way as in the MSX2 original. However, the Metal Gear does make an appearance in the non-canonical sequel Snake's Revenge (that was released in the west for the NES) during the game's attract sequence after the title screen, as well as during the early portions of the game itself, in which mass-produced versions of the original (dubbed "Metal Gear 1" in the game) are stored inside an enemy cargo ship that ships from the first enemy base that the player infiltrates.

The wreckage of the original makes a cameo in Metal Gear: Ghost Babel (a non-canon spinoff for the Game Boy Color that also serves as an alternate sequel to the first game), which is set in Galuade, a rebuilt version of Outer Heaven.

Both, the TX-55 and D are referenced in later Metal Gear Solid works: the blueprints of Metal Gear D are visible on Dr. Granin's desk in Metal Gear Solid 3: Snake Eater, and the TX-55 is depicted in a psychic vision along with Big Boss and the three "Les Enfants Terribles" sons in Metal Gear Solid: Portable Ops.

=== Metal Gear REX ===
Metal Gear REX is an entirely different Metal Gear model that appears in Metal Gear Solid designed by Yoji Shinkawa. Unlike previous Metal Gears, its legs are heavily armored and reinforced.

Metal Gear REX has near-impenetrable compound armor, a pair of 30 mm gatling guns, anti-tank missiles, and a free-electron laser, to protect itself from conventional forces. Its primary weapon, however, is a magnetic railgun capable of delivering an untraceable nuclear warhead anywhere in the world, without the propellant trail or launch flare that gives away the launch position of a traditional ballistic missile. It also possessed a radome, a satellite antenna-shaped object on REX's left side that provides information about the environment outside of the cockpit while keeping the pilot safe from harm, and increasing the accuracy of all weapons as well. Destroying the radome is crucial to rendering the virtual reality interface useless and forcing the pilot to manually control REX. The pilot is also forced to expose himself to enemy fire, by opening the cockpit in order to see outside (a weakness deliberately built into REX as a "character flaw").

Solid Snake battling Metal Gear REX in Metal Gear Solid

The story of Metal Gear Solid shows weapons company ArmsTech president Kenneth Baker bribes DARPA chief Donald Anderson to get covert U.S. Government funding for Metal Gear REX's development for the U.S. Army, and sends the single prototype to be tested at a nuclear weapons disposal facility on Shadow Moses Island. However, the Shadow Moses facility is taken over by rogue special forces unit FOXHOUND attempting to use REX as leverage to extort the U.S. Government. Solid Snake comes out of retirement and infiltrates the Shadow Moses facility in order to find out about REX. Liquid Snake and Revolver Ocelot intend to use REX to hold the world hostage. Later, Liquid uses REX to fight Snake. Snake, with the help of REX's lead engineer Dr. Hal Emmerich and the Cyborg Ninja, eliminates FOXHOUND and destroys the mecha.

Metal Gear Solid 2: Sons of Liberty reveals that Metal Gear REX's battle data were sold on the black market and Metal Gear variants spread worldwide; in response, Metal Gear RAY is designed to combat these variants and render them useless.

In the prequels, Metal Gear REX is seen in Metal Gear Solid 3: Snake Eater as Dr. Aleksandr Granin's original blueprints that are shown to Naked Snake which are later stolen by Ocelot, and seen in Metal Gear Solid: Portable Ops in a psychic vision along with Big Boss's sons.

Metal Gear Solid 4: Guns of the Patriots sees Old Snake sent back to Shadow Moses Island to secure the derilict Metal Gear REX, which has become Liquid Ocelot's new target. Liquid plans to remove REX's railgun to launch nuclear weapons since REX predates the SOP system and lacks their ID lockout mechanism. Arriving at the old hangar, Snake finds the damaged Metal Gear but discovers that Liquid has already removed the railgun. Later, Snake uses REX to confront Liquid piloting Metal Gear RAY. Despite RAY being developed as an anti-Metal Gear weapon and REX being damaged, Otacon reveals that REX has a "street fighter" program that was secretly uploaded to REX based on combat data that used its own hull as a weapon in itself, but was rejected by the military with no one but Otacon aware of its existence. This allowed Snake and REX to fight RAY on more equal footing and force Liquid to a stalemate; Otacon credits this to his assistance. REX is not seen destroyed and what happened to the mecha after the battle is unknown.

Metal Gear REX, Metal Gear RAY, and a Gekko make cameo appearances in the Shadow Moses Island stage in Super Smash Bros. Brawl and Super Smash Bros. Ultimate. It also made its appearance as the final boss from LittleBigPlanet with the use of Metal Gear Solid Packs. In Metal Gear Solid: Peace Walker, in the Isla Del Monstruo as part of a collaboration with Capcom's Monster Hunter series, defeating both the Rathalos and the Tigrex unlocks a monster known as "Gear REX", which heavily resembles its mecha counterpart.

=== Metal Gear RAY ===
Metal Gear RAY holding a Harrier aircraft in Metal Gear Solid 2: Sons of Liberty

Metal Gear RAY aka AM-01 is an anti-Metal Gear introduced in Metal Gear Solid 2: Sons of Liberty also designed by Yoji Shinkawa. This Metal Gear model comes in two variants: a manned prototype version developed to combat Metal Gear derivatives and an unmanned, computer-controlled version refitted to defend Arsenal Gear.

Metal Gear RAY differs from previous Metal Gear models in that it is not a nuclear launch platform, but instead, a weapon of conventional warfare, originally designed by the U.S. Marines to hunt down and destroy the many Metal Gear derivatives that became common after Metal Gear REX's plans leak following the events of Shadow Moses. RAY is designed to be even more maneuverable and flexible in deployment than other models and can operate both on land and in water. While RAY has a pair of Gatling guns and missile launchers on its back and knees to defend itself from more conventional battlefield threats, its primary weapon is a powerful water jet cutter, which can cut through heavily armored foes, such as Metal Gear derivatives. RAY is more organic in appearance and in function than previous models. Its streamlined shape helps to deflect enemy fire and allows for greater maneuverability both on land and in water. Its interior workings are also somewhat organic, as it has artificial fibers that contract when electricity is applied, much like natural muscle, instead of typical hydraulics; this pseudo-muscle tissue makes it very maneuverable. It also has a nervous-system-like network of conductive nanotubes, which connect the widely dispersed sensor systems and relay commands from the cockpit to the various parts of RAY's body, automatically bypassing damaged systems and rerouting to auxiliary systems when needed. Another feature is its blood-like armor-repair nanopaste, which is secreted from valves and coagulates wherever the exterior surface is damaged. Particularly unusual is its "face", with two "eyes" and a gaping "mouth", only seen when the head armor is removed. The original version is an operational prototype labeled "MARINES", which has a cockpit for a single pilot, and a long tail intended for balance while making leaps or operating underwater. The entire forward interior of the cockpit is a heads-up display, allowing the pilot to look around as if there were no obstruction between them and the battlefield. The mass-production model labeled "U.S. NAVY" lacks the tail of the prototype, but it has rounded knees and only one sensory input or "eye" instead of the prototype's two. They are also painted in an olive-drab camouflage pattern.

During the Tanker chapter (the prologue of Metal Gear Solid 2), Revolver Ocelot steals Metal Gear RAY off the disguised oil tanker and delivers the stolen prototype to The Patriots, an organization secretly running the United States. During the Plant chapter (the second part of Metal Gear Solid 2), Arsenal Gear has a force of unmanned mass-produced Metal Gear RAYs ready for immediate deployment against any possible threats under the command of the ship's AI GW. When Solidus Snake takes over Arsenal along with the slave RAYs, Solidus has them confront Raiden but some of them end up destroyed.

In Metal Gear Solid 4: Guns of the Patriots, Liquid Ocelot pilots a modified version of Metal Gear RAY that sports the prototype's two "eyes", cockpit and greyish-blue coloring, and the mass-production model's tailless design and rounded knees. It is labeled "OUTER HAVEN". Despite being an anti-REX Metal Gear, RAY contended with Metal Gear REX piloted by Old Snake, which was enhanced by combat data secretly uploaded by Otacon that allowed it to use its own hull as a weapon and was immobilized by the Metal Gear it was designed to counter.

Metal Gear RAY, Metal Gear REX, and a Gekko make cameo appearances in the Shadow Moses Island stage in Super Smash Bros. Brawl and Super Smash Bros. Ultimate. A modified, unmanned version of Metal Gear RAY used by Desperado appears in Metal Gear Rising: Revengeance. Unlike previous versions, it is equipped with giant swords and stealth cruise missiles in the arms, a plasma cannon instead of a water jet cutter, carbon nanotube fibers instead of synthetic muscle material, and a different tail.

=== Arsenal Gear ===
Arsenal Gear is a submersible, mobile fortress that appears in Metal Gear Solid 2: Sons of Liberty. It was developed by the U.S. Navy to monitor, block and tamper with Internet communications in order to further the goals of the Patriots. It is a metaphor for the change of warfare in the last decades of the 20th century, from nuclear war to a war of culture, information, and espionage.

Arsenal Gear is hidden under the Big Shell, and is controlled by AI "GW" designed by Emma Emmerich. According to The Document of Metal Gear Solid 2, the model below the Big Shell is not the only one, and each one is run by its own AI system connected to the Patriots. Arsenal is large enough to house - and also require - a significant force for its defense. Arsenal hidden under the Big Shell has an unspecified number of "Tengu Commandos", soldiers clad in powered armor and armed with P90 submachine guns and high-frequency blades. It also has a squadron of 25 unmanned mass-production Metal Gear RAYs under the direct control of GW. During Metal Gear Solid 2, Solid Snake and Raiden are actually being manipulated by GW. But as Emma's virus slowly destroys GW, Raiden is able to enter Arsenal Gear and uncover the many layers of deception concealing the true meaning behind everything. Arsenal is later directed to crash into Manhattan Island at the end of Raiden's mission. The exterior is shown when Snake, Raiden and Solidus Snake are heading for Federal Hall National Memorial and see the fortress speeding under many bridges before crashing. A scene showing Arsenal crashing through and destroying several buildings in Manhattan Island but was cut from the final version because of the terrorist attacks on September 11th.

Outer Haven is a modified Arsenal Gear submersible ark stolen by Liquid Ocelot in Metal Gear Solid 4: Guns of the Patriots. The ark features a Mount Rushmore-like sculpture of Solidus Snake, Solid Snake, Liquid Snake and Big Boss. Haven was later revealed to contain the rebuilt GW AI in its server room. It made its first appearance in the "Twin Suns" chapter. In the "Old Sun" chapter, Ocelot planned on using the GW ruins (still in the Patriots' system but not recognized by the remaining AIs as destroyed) to take control of the Patriots by using Metal Gear REX's railgun to destroy the satellite containing the primary AI JD. Using the railgun, he could stealth-launch the missile (with pure magnetic energies and no chemical propellants), thus protecting it from Patriot countermeasures. Haven also has an army of mass-production Metal Gear RAYs as protection against the USS Missouri.

=== Shagohod ===
The Shagohod (Russian: Шагоход, lit. 'step-walker'; occasionally referred to in English as "The Treading Behemoth") is not a Metal Gear (being a parallel design instead) but has a similar design and role in Metal Gear Solid 3: Snake Eater. Rather than a bipedal mecha, it is an unconventional tank armed with an intermediate-range ballistic missile and can propel to intercontinental ranges. Like the various Metal Gear designs, it can be crewed by a single pilot but has a station for a co-pilot.

The Shagohod has an articulated body, split into two parts. The front part uses screw propulsion, with a pair of Archimedes' screws on hydraulic legs, that pulls the bulky rear portion, suspended on a hovercraft-style air cushion. While this is an unusual mechanism for propulsion, far more unusual are the Shagohod's rocket boosters. With a sufficiently large flat piece of land (such as a highway or landing strip), the Shagohod can fire its rocket boosters to build up speed (up to more than 480 km/h or 300 mph) before firing its primary weapon, a nuclear-armed intermediate-range ballistic missile. In doing so, it serves as an additional stage for the rocket, allowing it to strike at targets nearly anywhere in the world (a range of over 6,000 miles [9,600 km]). The Shagohod also has parachutes in the back to help in slowing it down after a rocket-boosted missile launch. Besides its single SS-20 "Saber" IRBM (which has to be reloaded after firing), the Shagohod has defensive weaponry, including three 12.7mm DShKM machine guns to defend against aircraft and infantry, six 9K112 Kobra surface-to-air missiles to protect against aircraft, and a 100-barrel volley gun to defend against armor. The Shagohod's most evident weakness is in its propulsive screws; when they are blocked or damaged, the tank becomes nearly useless. Also, its need for a long, flat surface to accelerate seriously impairs its versatility.

The prequel Metal Gear Solid 3 depicts the Shagohod as a parallel development to the Metal Gear mecha; the Shagohod is developed by Dr. Sokolov at a secret base in Tselinoyarsk while self-proclaimed rival Director Granin conceives of the Metal Gear concept at approximately the same time. But Volgin favors Sokolov's Shagohod weapon over Granin's Metal Gear concept, and funds the production of the Shagohod prototype. This is possibly due to the fact that, though a walker like Metal Gear would ultimately prove to be a far more versatile system, the Shagohod was only an unusual combination of technologies that already existed at the time (tanks, ground effect, IRBMs, and booster rockets), as opposed to an unrealized idea requiring years or even decades of research as well as incredibly large amounts of money to produce. Sokolov is ultimately forced in Groznyj Grad's weapons lab to finish the Shagohod prototype as Volgin was planning to mass-produce the weapon and ship to all the countries of the Eastern Bloc, as well as bait to foment armed uprisings among dictators, ethnic insurgents and revolutionary groups throughout the Third World. Naked Snake had to take out this prototype per FOX's first mission, which Snake did with assistance from EVA.

=== Intercontinental Ballistic Metal Gear ===
Metal Gear RAXA's original conceptual artwork from Metal Gear Solid: Portable Ops

The Intercontinental Ballistic Metal Gear (or ICBMG for short;) is the featured mecha in Metal Gear Solid: Portable Ops. In the series chronology, this Metal Gear is the first built prototype. The design, completed by Dr. Sokolov, is based on Granin's original blueprints (the same ones seen in Metal Gear Solid 3). Unlike the future bipedal models, this Metal Gear's design is quadrupedal and its nuclear function is to act as a mobile launching device for MIRVs. While therefore capable of making nuclear strikes against several targets at once, its range is limited, and (unlike the Shagohod) is unable to compensate for it with speed. Thus, it must be physically transported to a point within range of the target(s) first. This is accomplished by having the ICBMG itself attached to the top of a rocket, launching it, detaching the unit at 3000 ft above the intended landing point, having it parachute back down to the ground, and launching its nuclear payload afterwards. In the game, Naked Snake encounters two models: the first is non-nuclear equipped test model Metal Gear RAXA which is used as rogue FOX leader Gene's decoy and the actual model that gets attached to a reproduced Saturn V rocket in the game's ending which Snake destroys in the cut-scene with the help of a defecting group of Red Army soldiers.

=== Gekko ===
Gekko (月光, Gekkō; meaning "moonlight") is a new unit featured in Metal Gear Solid 4: Guns of the Patriots; mass-produced, unmanned, bipedal combat mecha manufactured by ArmsTech Corp, and designated "Irving" by the U.S. Military, a name that stems from the Allied reporting name for the Nakajima J1N Gekkō twin-engine night fighter aircraft from WWII. With their widespread adoption by PMCs and their ability to perform a variety of combat support roles, they have largely supplanted conventional means of armored warfare.

Director Hideo Kojima stated in a pre-release interview that the Gekko are not the game's titular Metal Gears, stating that they are more like a jeep or a tank compared to the conventional Metal Gears such as REX and RAY. Rather than a literal Metal Gear, proper, the Gekko is instead what is known as an Unmanned Gear (UG); Autonomous Combat Vehicles. Their heads are reminiscent of Metal Gear REX's chassis design, with organic legs akin to that of Metal Gear RAY's. As stated, they are completely autonomous, using two large cameras as its "eyes"; one mounted on its head, the other at the front of its hip assembly. These are backed up by other sensors, mostly passive. In addition, the UG possesses a small, prehensile tether used to pick up small objects, grab targets, and even interface with various cybernetic systems, as evidenced by their Health-Draining attacks in Metal Gear Rising: Revengeance. The Gekko is incredibly agile, maneuverable and dexterous, thanks to its organic legs; made from artificial muscle tissue, cloned from embryonic stem cells of ungulate embryos (later models would supplant these cells with Carbon Nanotube Musculature), these legs allow the Gekko to pick up a man and throw him hard enough to penetrate a brick wall, deliver a kick that can overturn a 6x6 truck, dodge an RPG (and kill its operator), scale walls, crouch to enter buildings, run at speeds equivalent to a motor vehicle, and leap huge distances through the air.

The Gekko comes in several variants; two are designed for standard combat, both carrying anti-personnel machine guns mounted inside the "nose", while one carries heavier machine guns and missile launchers akin to REX. A third variant is the special purpose Suicide Gekko, designed to invade enemy facilities in groups before self-destructing en masse. Similar in combat terms when compared with traditional Metal Gear models, relatively little firepower is needed to actually destroy one. A quick blast with an assault rifle may cause one to trip if shot in the legs. Corresponding shots to the "neck" can destroy a Gekko with small arms such as a M4 carbine or FN P90. However, when a Gekko falls, it can quickly regain its footing even if tripped onto its head. Nonetheless, a heavy weapon such as any rocket-launcher, an M82A2, or the Rail Gun, can be used against the Gekko without requiring it to be collapsed. The Gekko makes use of sound in psychological warfare, particularly animal noises (such as cicadas while on the prowl to create an atmosphere of unease, and bull sounds in direct combat as a means of unnerving the enemy). They feature characteristics that are biomechanoid to some degree, as they have been shown to "bleed" when sliced at the legs as the machine could use a blood-like self-repairing nanopaste like RAY, though severe wounds on seemingly mechanical components have been known to "bleed" as well. In addition, they expel a green liquid, which may be lactic acid produced by the artificial muscles.

The Gekkos reappeared in Metal Gear Rising: Revengeance. Arms of Dwarf Gekkos are attached to Desperado operative Mistral while the Metal Gear EXCELSUS has Gekko UG escorts; Dwarf Gekko can also be seen attached to and "driving" larger UG's, such as World Marshall's Raptors.

=== Metal Gear Mk. II and Metal Gear Mk. III ===
The Metal Gear Mk. II is a robotic companion to Old Snake in Metal Gear Solid 4. This unit is similar (albeit a bit more angular in appearance using an OLED screen and has wheels instead of feet) to the Snatcher version and is controlled by Otacon. This version is not meant to be a weapon and named as such so that Otacon "would never forget that he was the one who built Metal Gear REX." He uses it to provide ammunition and advice to Snake in the Middle East, South America and Eastern Europe. The Mk. II can also be used as a recon device, turn invisible, and shock enemies knocking them unconscious. However, it also runs on batteries which deplete while in operation. The Mk. II is automated in the game, but can be controlled by the player if needed. The Mk. II is destroyed after the Eastern Europe mission and replaced by the Metal Gear Mk. III, a similar design which accompanies Snake at Shadow Moses and Outer Haven. The Mk. III has the same body as the Mk. II, but with a red-colored exterior, and serves the same function.

=== Peace Walker ===
Peace Walker is the name given to an autonomous nuclear weapons platform in Metal Gear Solid: Peace Walker. Developed in secret by disavowed CIA agent Coldman and deployed to Costa Rica in 1974, Peace Walker was designed to prove that nuclear deterrence is a myth by objectively and logically assessing the threat of a nuclear exchange and retaliating in kind. Peace Walker is quadrupedal in form, with a spherical radome "head" and a cylindrical AI core functioning as its brain. It is designed to be fully self-supporting, with an array of anti-personnel weapons used to defend itself, and a protocol that calls for it to recognise and eliminate all threats to itself before launching its nuclear missile.

Peace Walker is supported by four autonomous weapons that the player fights throughout the game:

- Pupa (GW-PUPA 5000), a larger version of the Shagohod that has had its Archimedes screws replaced by caterpillar tracks. It is designed to be fast and agile.
- Chrysalis (TJ-CHRYSALIS 6000), an aerial unit with VTOL capabilities. It is referred to as "El Colibri" ("the hummingbird") by the Sandinistas.
- Cocoon (TR-COCOON 7000), a giant land battleship lined with numerous weapons emplacements.
- Basilisk (AL-AURELIA 8000), a bipedal form of Peace Walker that contracts itself to make it easier to be shipped.

=== Metal Gear ZEKE ===
Metal Gear ZEKE is a Metal Gear built in the Militaires Sans Frontieres in Metal Gear Solid: Peace Walker. Developer Huey and MSF sub-commander Kazuhira Miller named the mech in honor of Granin's "Metal Gear" design philosophy and the Zero fighter, which was codenamed ZEKE by the Allies in World War II. The unit is also the series' second Metal Gear that the player can use in any capacity, as it can be fielded in the Outer Ops missions once all the parts have been installed. ZEKE's default armaments are a railgun mated to a radome, three machine guns, and a number of guided missiles. Additional weapons salvaged from the four A.I. weapon bosses (Pupa, Chrysalis, Cocoon, and Peace Walker) can also be installed. ZEKE's nuclear weapon was salvaged from the remains of Peace Walker. ZEKE is a combination of AI technology built by Dr. Strangelove and the scrap parts of the game's four main bosses. Although it is AI-controlled in its testing stages, in the game's true ending shows that Paz Ortega Andrade has modified ZEKE to be manned and uses the mecha to attempt a nuclear strike on the US east coast, forcing Naked Snake to defeat her and heavily damage the unit.

ZEKE is still in the MSF inventory during the events of Metal Gear Solid V: Ground Zeroes. However, when the MSF gets word of an IAEA inspection team coming to visit Mother Base, the unit and its warhead is lowered to the sea floor. The machine's fate after the destruction of MSF's Mother Base is unknown.

=== Metal Gear EXCELSUS ===
Appearing in Metal Gear Rising: Revengeance, Metal Gear EXCELSUS is one of the largest Metal Gears to feature in the series. The unit appears to be modeled by crabs or arachnids, with its front legs doubling as retractable blades that can alternately be used to crush or cut its way through armor, buildings, or the earth itself. It is also armed with two cannons mounted on its "head" that fire-directed bursts of super-heated plasma and have a division of Gekko units on board. The unit has a spherical cockpit that is mounted on a gyroscope; however, due to the system's limited physical control, the machine's arsenal, and its full range of movement, only nanomachine-implanted pilots can operate it. Unlike other Metal Gears, it lacks any nuclear armaments.

Metal Gear EXCELSUS was developed by AT Corp during 2016 after small-scale Unmanned Gears proved to be no longer effective once cyborg tech began to advance. Its name is derived from Brontosaurus excelsus, an extinct species of quadruped sauropod dinosaurs and a member of the family Diplodocidae, with "excelsus" meaning "high" or "lofty," hence its name. Unlike previous units, Metal Gear EXCELSUS was purely designed for asymmetrical warfare, capable of causing collateral damage without breaking stride. The unit possesses sheer firepower and durability at the cost of its combat capabilities. In 2018, Raiden encounters a Metal Gear EXCELSUS unit at the Shabhazabad Air Base in Pakistan, piloted by Colorado senator and presidential candidate Steven Armstrong. The mecha bore Desperado's emblem on its frame, which Armstrong used with the intention to frame Desperado for the attack, as part of his plan to ensure the war economy's revitalization and to win any subsequent election in a landslide, with his connections to the PMCs. Doktor speculates that if Armstrong's plan succeeds, "herds" of EXCELSI (Note: A term referring to multiple Metal Gear EXCELSUS units.) would be used to crush Pakistan's FATA. Raiden battles and eventually defeats EXCELSUS by ripping off one of its blades and using it to strike and destroy the Metal Gear by the head. After the battle, Armstrong exited its cockpit and used his nanomachines to engage Raiden in a long and grueling fight that further tore down the wrecked mecha.

=== Walker Gear ===
The Walker Gear (also known as the D-Walker) is introduced in Metal Gear Solid V: The Phantom Pain. Designed by Emmerich and mass-produced by the Soviet Army, it is a bipedal infantry support unit that serves as one of the player's modes of transport, having wheels in the legs for added speed. Walker Gears have arm manipulators for close combat, but can be equipped with small arms, Miniguns, and missile launchers for stealth and assault missions.

The Walker Gear's main body is also mated to the Battle Gear, a combat support mobile weapon designed for Venom Snake and the Diamond Dogs. It moves on four maglev units and its main weapon is an electromagnetic railgun. Players can use the Battle Gear for Dispatch missions.

=== Sahelanthropus ===
The Sahelanthropus (also known as the ST-84 Metal Gear) is a large Metal Gear unit that appears in Metal Gear Solid V: The Phantom Pain. It is classified as an Anthropoid Bipedal Weapon System and was built by the Soviet Union in co-operation with the mysterious XOF organization. Its name is derived from Sahelanthropus tchadensis, an extinct hominine species theorised to be the last common ancestor between humans and chimpanzees as the design makes Sahelanthropus the "missing link" between the early prototypes (Shagohod and Peace Walker) and the later bipedal units (TX-55 Metal Gear and Metal Gear REX). Sahelanthropus initially appears in a crouched position with a heavily armored control unit that can be used as a battering ram against environmental hazards, but can also convert to an upright "standing" position. Its primary weapon is a tensile rod that can separate into individual whip-like threads or condense into a quarterstaff-like rod that can discharge metallic archaea—microbes that feed on minerals—into the local environment, triggering a series of explosions. Sahelanthropus is also armed with a prototype railgun that can only be fired from its crouched position, and an array of machine guns and missile launchers. It can also release unmanned drones that scan the area for targets. Unlike other Metal Gears, Sahelanthropus cannot fire a nuclear weapon; rather, its body is made up of depleted uranium which can be enriched to become uranium-235 by the metallic archaea to 90% purity. Given Sahelanthropus' size, this creates a bomb with an extremely high yield. Lead engineer Emmerich described the choice of depleted uranium as being a direct result of the need to keep the weapon's mass to a minimum despite ceramic armor offering better protection.

Within the game, Sahelanthropus is unfinished, with Emmerich unable to complete the control unit as he wanted to protect Peace Walker's vulnerable AI pods by encasing the pod used to regulate the systems within the armor. However, the weapon is controlled by the psychic Tretij Rebenok to give additional mobility for Skull Face. It is transported to Diamond Dogs' Mother Base to act as a symbol of their history. Sahelanthropus is later stolen by Eli with aid from Tretij Rebenok.

== Models in other games ==
These models are not part of the mainstream Metal Gear series continuity, either because they appear in a non-canonical game (Snake's Revenge, Metal Gear: Ghost Babel and Metal Gear Acid) or because the game in which they appear is not a Metal Gear game at all (Snatcher).

=== Metal Gear Mk. II (Snatcher) ===
The Metal Gear Mk. II in Snatcher is the robotic sidekick of the game's protagonist, Gillian Seed, a JUNKER agent. He is a navigator built by JUNKER engineer Harry Benson to assist Gillian and facilitate his investigation. According to Harry, he was designed after the "Metal Gear menace from the 20th century." He is equipped with a forensic analyzer, as well as a videophone Gillian uses to communicate with his wife and other characters. The Metal Gear is voiced by Mami Koyama in the Japanese versions and by Lucy Childs in the English-language Sega CD version. A hand-size model appears in the spinoff SD Snatcher named Petit Metal, its function in the game is to display statistical data during battle or to automatic battle for the player.

=== Metal Gear 2 ===
The Metal Gear 2 from Snake's Revenge is a successor to the original Metal Gear described as "seven times more powerful" than the original. It is a bipedal mech similar to the original equipped with a large missile cannon, although its precise specifications are never revealed. Snake is told of its existence by his helicopter pilot after completing his initial objective. In the game's end sequence, Metal Gear 2 becomes active and initiates a countdown sequence, announcing to launch a series of nuclear missiles around the globe, starting with New York, Tokyo and Moscow. The path to Metal Gear 2 is blocked by a fence and the player can only destroy the mech by firing guided missiles into the air duct.

=== Metal Gear GANDER ===
Metal Gear GANDER's concept art as shown on the official website

The Metal Gear model in Metal Gear: Ghost Babel. Metal Gear GANDER is the result of the U.S. Army's "Project Babel" after the U.S. Government procured the data from the original prototype in Outer Heaven. It is stolen by the Gindra Liberation Front and taken to their fortress of Galuade (the former Outer Heaven). Its armament consists of two nuclear warhead-launching rail guns (similar to Metal Gear REX), two vulcan cannons, six guided missile pods, two automated flying attack pods, a pair of spread fire cannons, and a close range flamethrower. While GANDER had a railgun similar to REX, it required an entire power plant to operate. Secretly, its most powerful weapon was a satellite-based data link system that allows it to launch nuclear missiles anywhere in the world; likewise, it took the same amount of power to function. The design is based on one of Shinkawa's unused Metal Gear REX concepts.

=== Metal Gear KODOQUE ===
Metal Gear KODOQUE is the Metal Gear model featured in Metal Gear Acid. Its name is derived from the Japanese word "Kodoku" or "Isolation". One of the larger Metal Gear models, KODOQUE has two armor-like plates on each of its arms that come equipped with a remote control missile launcher. There are four slots for missiles on each arm, coming to a total of 8 missiles at one time. When not being used, these arms can form a protective cocoon around the Metal Gear. It also comes with a beam cannon near the legs, and can fire a plasma shot from its head when both arms are destroyed. This beam can be interrupted if four rods in a control room are destroyed. The inside is also different from Metal Gears: It comes equipped with a control room, and has sentry bots for security. It also has multiple controls when compared to previous Metal Gears having a cockpit. This Metal Gear is also unmanned and is simply controlled by an AI.

In Metal Gear Acid 2, KODOQUE's wreck was salvaged and brought to the SaintLogic facility. The Metal Gear is activated by one of Koppelthorn's Test subjects, Golab. It is kept in the four-story Metal Gear Prototype building, which is destroyed by Snake and Venus. Before destroying the building, Snake and Venus have to defeat KODOQUE before the time limit runs out.

=== Chaioth Ha Qadesh ===
Chaioth Ha Qadesh is the Metal Gear model which appears in Metal Gear Acid 2. The name Chaioth Ha Qadesh is derived from the Keter, a high level in the Kabbalah, a form of mystical Judaism. The name refers to a group of angels, called The Holy Living Creatures (Chayot Ha Qodesh - "חיות הקדש" in Hebrew). Originally designed as a way to control Model 3 test subjects, Chaioth Ha Qadesh uses the EGO (Enhanced Governing Organization) Operating System to control various modified soldiers and guard robots. SaintLogic developed the Metal Gear for that purpose, but Dr. Thomas Koppelthorn stole Chaioth Ha Qadesh as a means to get revenge for his wife Lucinda and kill all involved in the Praulia Massacre.

Like other Metal Gears, Chaioth Ha Qadesh can fire a nuclear missile from any area of the world to its target. However, one difference is that it mainly uses neutron bombs as its main weapon, and also contains the data on all test subjects in the SaintLogic institute. It has a missile launcher on its back, and can fire bullets from the Vulcan cannons on each of its arms. It also has a slot on the top for launching energy that can cause any equipped cards to be destroyed. Metal Gear Chaioth Ha Qadesh uses nano chip expansions so the player can see what cards the Metal Gear has and will use. The cockpit, located in the upper zone of Metal Gear's head, can be ejected, which Lucy uses to kill Koppelthorn by launching him out of Chaioth Ha Qadesh and then destroying the cockpit (and what was inside it) with a missile. At the end of the game, Snake empties its equipped nuclear warhead, hides inside the casing, and launches himself into the ocean to escape U.S. soldiers.

== Reception ==
In 2011, UGO.com ranked Metal Gear Mk. II and III as eighth on the list of the best robots in gaming, while Joystick Division ranked Metal Gears in general as first on their list, adding "For one of the biggest franchises of all time to feature you as the catalyst for action in many of its games, you've got to be pretty damn iconic." That same year, PlayStation Universe ranked RAY (MGS2) and REX vs. RAY (MGS4) at the second and first place respectively on the list of the greatest Metal Gear Solid boss battles, also discussing the latter in the feature series Badass Bosses. In 2012, IGN ranked Metal Gear REX as 14th on the list of top video game weapons, and Complex ranked it the sixth "coolest" robot in video game history in 2014.
