= Christopher Randolph =

American actor

- Born: 1959 (age 66–67); Boston, Massachusetts, United States
- Occupations: Actor, voice actor

Christopher Randolph (born 1959 in Boston, Massachusetts) is an American actor known for providing the English voice for Hal "Otacon" Emmerich and Dr. "Huey" Emmerich in the Metal Gear Solid series. Prior to landing his role as Otacon, he auditioned for multiple parts, including Solid Snake. After David Hayter was recast from playing Snake in Metal Gear Solid V: Ground Zeroes, Randolph became the longest serving English voice actor in the franchise, having a role in all but one main Metal Gear Solid series game since 1998 (the exception being Metal Gear Solid 3: Snake Eater). He also writes, directs, and teaches acting. He received an MFA from the graduate acting program at UCSD.

His on-screen guest appearances include TV shows such as Will & Grace, Doogie Howser, M.D., Mad About You, American Masters and NewsRadio. He's appeared on several soap operas, including Days of Our Lives, As the World Turns, and Guiding Light, where he continues to recur as ER Doctor Tompkins, and he has leading roles in the short films Convention, directed by Ryan Fleck (Half Nelson), and Pumpkin Hell, directed by Max Finneran. His numerous stage credits include King Lear on Broadway with Christopher Plummer, and many Off-Broadway and regional productions around the country. He is the brother of actress Tod Randolph, and singer/songwriter Nick Randolph of the group Stonehoney.

== Filmography ==
=== Film ===
Year	Title	Role	Notes
1999	The Fifth Step	Jared	Short film
2006	Metal Gear Solid: Digital Graphic Novel	Hal Emmerich / Otacon	Video
2007	Pumpkin Hell	Jeffrey	Short film
2009	Dream Date	Mr.	Short film
2013	Metal Gear Solid 2: Digital Graphic Novel	Hal Emmerich / Otacon	Video
2015	The Shells	Old Sleepwalker	
2017	The Sounding	Carter James	

=== Television ===
Year	Title	Role	Notes
1993	Doogie Howser, M.D.	Reporter	Episode: "Love Means Constantly Having to Say You're Sorry"
1998	NewsRadio	Paramedic	Episode: "Copy Machine"
1998	Mad About You	Office Worker	Episode: "The Finale"
2000	Will & Grace	Man	Episode: "Husbands and Trophy Wives"
2005	As the World Turns	Dr. Hendricks	2 episodes
2007	American Masters	Jay Gatsby	Episode: "Novel Reflections: The American Dream"
2022	Law & Order	Judge Linder	2 episodes

=== Video games ===
Year	Title	Role	Notes
1998	Metal Gear Solid	Hal Emmerich / Otacon	Credited as Christopher Fritz
2001	Metal Gear Solid 2: Sons of Liberty	Hal Emmerich / Otacon	
2004	Metal Gear Solid: The Twin Snakes	Hal Emmerich / Otacon	
2008	Super Smash Bros. Brawl	Hal Emmerich / Otacon	
2008	Metal Gear Solid 4: Guns of the Patriots	Hal Emmerich / Otacon	New lines recorded for 2026 rerelease in Metal Gear Solid: Master Collection Volume 2
2008	Metal Gear Online	Hal Emmerich / Otacon	
2010	Metal Gear Solid: Peace Walker	Huey Emmerich	
2014	Metal Gear Solid V: Ground Zeroes	Huey Emmerich	
2015	Metal Gear Solid V: The Phantom Pain	Huey Emmerich	
2016	Mafia III	Additional Voices	
2018	Red Dead Redemption 2	Additional Motion Capture	Motion capture
2018	Super Smash Bros. Ultimate	Hal Emmerich / Otacon	Archive audio from Super Smash Bros. Brawl
2025	Metal Gear Solid Delta: Snake Eater	Hal Emmerich / Otacon	"Snake vs. Bomberman" mode; Xbox Series X/S and Microsoft Store versions only
