= Characters of the Metal Gear series =

Promotional screenshot of Social Ops, featuring the major characters of the series

The Metal Gear franchise, created by Hideo Kojima and featuring character and mecha designs by Yoji Shinkawa, features a large cast of characters, several of whom are soldiers with supernatural powers provided by scientific advancements.

The series initially follows the mercenary Solid Snake. In the Metal Gear games, he goes on government missions to find the Metal Gears while encountering Gray Fox and Big Boss in Outer Heaven and Zanzibar Land. In the Metal Gear Solid games, he works with Otacon and Raiden while opposing Liquid Snake's FOXHOUND, Solidus Snake, the Patriots and Revolver Ocelot. Beginning with Metal Gear Solid 3: Snake Eater, several games have served as prequels, following Big Boss' past as Naked Snake, as well as the origins of the organizations.

While the characters of the Metal Gear games had designs modeled after Hollywood actors, the Metal Gear Solid games established consistent designs based on Shinkawa's idea of what would appeal to gamers, with several characters that he designed following ideas from Kojima and staff. Critical reception of the game's cast has been positive, with publications praising their personalities and roles within the series.

== Creation and design ==
Metal Gear began as a pastiche of action films of the time and its characters were pastiches of contemporary action movie heroes. When Shinkawa began designing the characters for PlayStation's Metal Gear Solid, they were given their respective established visual appearances. Due to hardware limitations, Shinkawa designed them to appeal to gamers. Because of the time skip between titles, some characters were redesigned to fit in the game's setting. With the improved technology of consoles like the PlayStation and PlayStation 2, starting with Metal Gear Solid 2: Sons of Liberty the staff gave the characters a more realistic look, despite their initial doubts. This caused difficulties for the staff, as they had to make the faces more realistic. When illustrating characters, Shinkawa does not focus on minor details such as eyes, instead illustrating something more symbolic. While Solid Snake was easy to illustrate due to having a consistent design, with Big Boss's younger self, Naked Snake, being conceived via minor changes to his original version, other characters' designs were more time-consuming.

When they debuted, player characters Solid Snake and Raiden were meant to represent the player, though in subsequent games they gained more defined personalities. As Snake became more experienced in combat throughout the series, Kojima attempted to create more challenging antagonists for boss fights. This resulted in Big Boss's clones from Metal Gear Solid and Metal Gear Solid 2, who have the same abilities as Solid Snake, the Cobra Unit from Metal Gear Solid 3: Snake Eater, who participated in World War II, and the Beauty and the Beast Corps from Metal Gear Solid 4: Guns of the Patriots, who possessed few human traits. While the villains in the first games had detailed backstories, the Cobra Unit members were intended to have little information known about them, resulting in a significant impact among players upon their deaths. This also made it difficult for Shinkawa to conceptualize their visual appearance, as he had little to no background information. By Metal Gear Solid 2, Kojima was inspired by the Sherlock Holmes novels to introduce a sidekick character in order to view Snake from a different perspective.

Metal Gear Solid marked the first time that characters had voice actors, with Solid Snake and Naked Snake being voiced by Akio Ōtsuka in Japanese. Ōtsuka remembers being surprised during his debut as a result of the large amount of dialogue Snake was given. In English, casting was directed by Kris Zimmerman and supervised by a member of Konami. Solid Snake's English voice actor was David Hayter, who, despite having issues with some of the dialogue in Metal Gear Solid, became attached to the series.

Various Metal Gear Solid games have been expanded upon in remakes and other media, such as Metal Gear Solid: The Twin Snakes, Metal Gear Solid: Digital Graphic Novel, Metal Gear Solid 2: Digital Graphic Novel, and Metal Gear Online.

== Major characters ==
=== Solid Snake ===
Solid Snake (ソリッド・スネーク, Soriddo Sunēku), otherwise known as David (デイビッド, Deibiddo), Iroquois Pliskin (イロコィ・プリスキン, Irokoi Purisukin) and Old Snake (オールド・スネーク, Ōrudo Sunēku), is the main protagonist of the original Metal Gear Solid series. In Metal Gear and Metal Gear 2: Solid Snake, he is a rookie FOXHOUND agent tasked with finding and destroying the Metal Gears in Outer Heaven and Zanzibar Land, leading to confrontations with his comrade Gray Fox and superior Big Boss (the phantom in Outer Heaven and his father in Zanzibar Land). Snake befriends Otacon while fighting the corrupt FOXHOUND, led by his terrorist twin brother Liquid Snake in Metal Gear Solid, and assists Raiden in fighting Solidus Snake and the Patriots in Metal Gear Solid 2: Sons of Liberty. In Metal Gear Solid 4: Guns of the Patriots, he returns as protagonist, with an accelerated aging process. Solid Snake is voiced by Akio Ōtsuka in Japanese and by David Hayter in English.

=== Big Boss ===
Big Boss (ビッグ・ボス, Biggu Bosu), also known as Naked Snake (ネイキッド・スネーク, Neikiddo Sunēku) and Jack (ジャック, Jakku), is the main protagonist of the Metal Gear Solid prequel series. He was considered the greatest soldier who ever lived, and is the genetic father of Solid Snake who has foiled his two plans in Metal Gear and Metal Gear 2: Solid Snake, as well as Liquid Snake and Solidus Snake. His past as a member of the FOX special forces team is explored in Metal Gear Solid 3: Snake Eater. After defeating The Boss, he establishes FOXHOUND and the Militaires Sans Frontières in the subsequent prequels, as well as utilized Venom Snake as a body double in Metal Gear Solid V: The Phantom Pain. In Japanese, the character is voiced by Akio Ōtsuka. In English, Big Boss/Naked Snake is voiced by David Hayter in Metal Gear Solid 3: Snake Eater, Metal Gear Solid: Portable Ops and Metal Gear Solid: Peace Walker, and by Kiefer Sutherland in Metal Gear Solid V: Ground Zeroes and Metal Gear Solid V: The Phantom Pain. The older Big Boss in Metal Gear Solid 4: Guns of the Patriots is voiced by Chikao Ōtsuka in Japanese and by Richard Doyle in English.

=== Gray Fox ===
Gray Fox (グレイ・フォックス, Gurei Fokkusu; spelled "Grey Fox" in the MSX2 versions) is a high-ranking agent of FOXHOUND, with the "Fox" codename being the highest distinction within the unit.

He first appears in the MSX2 games, where his face portrait was modeled after actor Tom Berenger. In Metal Gear, he goes missing during a mission to Outer Heaven, with his last transmission being a cryptic message that reads "Metal Gear". After Solid Snake rescues him, he reveals the TX-55 Metal Gear's true nature. In Metal Gear 2: Solid Snake, he pilots the advanced Metal Gear D and confronts Snake while secretly assisting him as an anonymous informant. The game reveals that he left FOXHOUND and defected to Zanzibar Land and expands on his past as Frank Jaeger (フランク・イェーガー, Furanku Yēgā; "Frank Yeager" in the MSX2 version) who fell in love with Czech figure skater Gustava Heffner while in Calgary for the 1988 Winter Olympics. Gustava unsuccessfully attempted to seek asylum with him in the United States and was subsequently stripped of her competition rights. Afterwards, Jaeger came to resent his superiors, while being unaware that Gustava joined the StB and was working in Zanzibar as a bodyguard for Dr. Kio Marv. During his and Snake's first direct encounter as enemies, he kills Gustava while piloting the Metal Gear; after Snake destroys the Metal Gear, he challenges him to a fistfight in a minefield and is seemingly killed.

In Metal Gear Solid, Gray Fox returns as the original Cyborg Ninja (サイボーグ忍者, Saibōgu Ninja), having been grafted into a powered armor exoskeleton and armed with a high-frequency blade. According to Hideo Kojima, the Cyborg Ninja "was born from this Shin-chan's graffiti." During Liquid Snake's FOXHOUND revolt at Shadow Moses, Fox challenges Solid Snake to a fight, maiming Revolver Ocelot in the process, before disappearing in a violent rage. Throughout the game, he is the faceless contact "Deepthroat" who provides Snake cryptic advice through codec. Naomi Hunter reveals to Snake that she is his foster sister and that he is the Cyborg Ninja. After revealing to Snake that he killed Naomi's parents and became her foster brother out of remorse for his actions, Fox fights Metal Gear REX and its pilot Liquid, and destroys its radome with a prototype railgun. He is mortally wounded and is killed by REX after Snake refuses to kill him.

In Metal Gear Solid 2: Sons of Liberty, Raiden initially believes him to be alive during Solidus Snake's Manhattan incident before learning that the Cyborg Ninja is actually Olga Gurlukovich.

Metal Gear Solid: Portable Ops, set twenty-five years before Metal Gear, features a teenage version of the character under the codename Null (ヌル, Nuru), a masked machete-wielding assassin. He is subjected to a secret CIA project to be the "perfect soldier" and recruited into Gene's corrupt FOX unit during the San Hieronymo takeover. Throughout the game, he fights Naked Snake before Snake realizes that Null was a boy in Mozambique who used his innocence as a cover to kill government soldiers with only a knife while speaking some German, leading to the name "Frank Jaeger", German for "Frank Hunter". Snake defeats Jaeger and sends him elsewhere for help.

Metal Gear Solid 4: Guns of the Patriots reveals his murder of Para-Medic was part of a plan to free Big Boss from Zero's control.

There is a Cyborg Ninja unique character card in Metal Gear Acid. Outside of the Metal Gear games, the Cyborg Ninja appears as a driver in Konami Krazy Racers and as an Assist Trophy in both Super Smash Bros. Brawl and Super Smash Bros. Ultimate. The original Cyborg Ninja's exoskeleton also appears as a downloadable content skin for Raiden in Metal Gear Rising: Revengeance, and Venom Snake in Metal Gear Solid V: The Phantom Pain.

Kojima once expressed interest in developing a game with Gray Fox as the main playable character.

In Japanese, Gray Fox is voiced by Kaneto Shiozawa in Metal Gear Solid, Jun Fukuyama in Metal Gear Solid: Portable Ops, and Takumi Yamazaki in the Metal Gear Solid: Digital Graphic Novel recreations. In English, Gray Fox is voiced by Greg Eagles in Metal Gear Solid, Rob Paulsen in Metal Gear Solid: The Twin Snakes and the Super Smash Bros. Brawl games, and Larc Spies in Metal Gear Solid: Portable Ops and the Metal Gear Solid: Digital Graphic Novel recreations.

=== Roy Campbell ===
Colonel Roy Campbell (ロイ・キャンベル大佐, Roi Kyanberu-taisa; Roy Kyanbel in the MSX2 version of Metal Gear 2) is the second commanding officer of FOXHOUND.

He was introduced in Metal Gear 2, in which he serves as Solid Snake's primary radio contact, giving information about the mission objective and general gameplay tips for Zanzibar Land.

In Metal Gear Solid, Campbell's niece, Meryl Silverburgh, is held captive by Liquid Snake's FOXHOUND team. In one of the game's endings, he reveals that Meryl is his daughter, the result of an affair between him and his late brother's wife. In Metal Gear Solid 2, he is impersonated by an AI constructed by supercomputer GW within Arsenal Gear for the Patriots who poses as Raiden's commanding officer.

In Metal Gear Solid 3, Campbell does not appear in the main story, but appears in the game over screen scolding the player for causing a time paradox if certain characters are killed, as well as in the Ape Escape crossover minigame "Snake vs. Monkey". A young version of the character, working as a Green Beret, appears in Portable Ops, where he and Naked Snake are imprisoned by the FOX unit in South America before escaping to recruit Gene's disenfranchised enemy soldiers into an early version of Militaires Sans Frontières.

In Metal Gear Solid 4, Campbell works for a UN Security Council advisory body that monitors PMC activities. He sends Old Snake on an unofficial mission to assassinate Liquid Ocelot and stop his activities, providing resources and transportation to complete the mission. He is married to Rosemary, which causes a rift between him and Meryl, who learns that he is her father. However, the marriage is a sham used to fool the Patriots and protect Rose and Raiden's son John. Following the Patriots' destruction, he reconciles with Meryl and walks down the aisle at her wedding. Outside of Metal Gear, he reprises his role in Metal Gear: Ghost Babel, a side-story which serves as an alternate sequel to the events of the original Metal Gear, and, along with Otacon and Mei Ling, serves as one of Snake's codec contacts in both Super Smash Bros. Brawl and Super Smash Bros. Ultimate. He also makes a codec appearance in a minigame in Ape Escape 3.

Roy Campbell was voiced by Takeshi Aono in Japanese and by Paul Eiding in English; the former's death resulted in the character's retirement from future games out of respect. His younger self is voiced by Toshio Furukawa in Japanese and by David Agranov in English.

=== Revolver Ocelot ===
Revolver Ocelot (リボルバー・オセロット, Riborubā Oserotto), also known as Shalashaska (シャラシャーシカ, Sharashāshika), Major Ocelot (オセロット少佐, Oserotto-shōsa) and Liquid Ocelot (リキッド・オセロット, Rikiddo Oserotto), is a gunslinger and nemesis of Solid Snake. Due to his role as a double agent, he has been affiliated with various antagonists, including as Liquid Snake's right-hand man in FOXHOUND in Metal Gear Solid, Solidus Snake's right-hand man and the Patriots' agent in Metal Gear Solid 2, and as Naked Snake's rival and the Philosophers' triple agent in Metal Gear Solid 3. However, he also works independently, as he serves as the main antagonist of Metal Gear Solid 4 and is an ally of Venom Snake in Metal Gear Solid V. In Japanese, Revolver Ocelot and Liquid Ocelot are voiced by Kōji Totani and Banjō Ginga respectively while his younger self is voiced by Takumi Yamazaki and Satoshi Mikami. In English, the character was voiced by Patric Zimmerman while his younger self is voiced by Josh Keaton and Troy Baker.

=== Otacon ===
Hal Emmerich (ハル・エメリッヒ, Haru Emerihhi), nicknamed Otacon (オタコン, Otakon), is Solid Snake's close friend, an employee of ArmsTech, and Metal Gear REX's engineer, who later becomes a founding member of the non-profit Philanthropy organization.

Hal Emmerich was born in 1980 to scientists Dr. Strangelove and Dr. "Huey" Emmerich, who was born on the day of the Hiroshima bombing, with his grandfather having worked on the Manhattan Project. When he was a child, Huey attempted to use him as a test pilot for the Metal Gear ST-84, as it could only be piloted by a child. When Strangelove opposed this, Huey killed her during an argument. Years later, Huey married a British woman named Julie Danziger and they had a daughter, Emma. After Huey committed suicide by drowning himself in the family pool and attempted to drown Emma, she became estranged from Hal, blaming him for not trying to save her. Soon after, Hal ran away from home and dropped out of school, educating himself through the Internet and calling himself Otacon, short for "Otaku Convention", after becoming a fan of anime. After enrolling at MIT and earning a Ph.D. from Princeton University, he was recruited by the FBI's Engineering Research Facility, but was fired after hacking into their database. He was later hired by ArmsTech, Inc. as the lead engineer for Metal Gear REX. He was excited at the prospect of developing a mecha, like those in the anime he enjoys, and believed that it was a mobile defense system, when in reality it was a nuclear doomsday weapon.

In Metal Gear Solid, Otacon encounters Solid Snake and learns of Metal Gear REX's true nature. After falling in love with FOXHOUND member Sniper Wolf, he is distraught that Snake would have to kill her, but aids Snake in destroying REX and ending the terrorist uprising. According to the in-universe novel In the Darkness of Shadow Moses: The Unofficial Truth, Otacon allegedly left for Great Britain after the terrorist uprising to visit relatives. After the schematics for Metal Gear were placed on the black market by Revolver Ocelot, Snake and Otacon formed Philanthropy, an organization dedicated to ending proliferation of Metal Gear-type weapons.

Otacon next appears in Metal Gear Solid 2: Sons of Liberty. In 2007, he receives an email from Emma, informing him of the new prototype Metal Gear RAY. However, the email is actually a trap for the Patriots to lure Solid Snake out of hiding and frame him for terrorism by having Ocelot hijack RAY and framing him with forged evidence. After faking Snake's death using Liquid Snake's corpse, he manages Philanthropy's activities while keeping Snake's survival secret from the public. In 2009, he receives an anonymous email from Liquid informing him of the development of Arsenal Gear in the Big Shell and Solidus Snake infiltrates it with SEAL Team 10 to rescue the hostages, including Emma. However, Emma dies due to stab wounds inflicted by Vamp and, before her death, admits that she always admired Hal and wanted to follow in his footsteps. Following her death, he falls into despair until Snake encourages him to move on and rescue the hostages. Afterwards, Snake meets with Otacon at their hideout and receives a disk containing info on the Wisemen's Committee.

In Metal Gear Solid 4: Guns of the Patriots, he and Sunny build a remote-control robotic companion to Snake, Metal Gear Mk. II, whose name was taken from a robotic character of the same name in Snatcher. He becomes romantically involved with Naomi Hunter until she commits suicide. In the finale, Otacon resolves to live with Snake and serve as a witness of his existence. By the time of Metal Gear Rising: Revengeance, Otacon is mentioned to have officially adopted Sunny and is popular with women, but keeps them at arm's length due to the trauma of losing Emma and Naomi.

Otacon is voiced by Hideyuki Tanaka in Japanese and by Christopher Randolph in English.

=== Liquid Snake ===
Liquid Snake (リキッド・スネーク, Rikiddo Sunēku), real name Eli (イーライ, Īrai), is Solid Snake's twin brother, Big Boss's second son, and the main antagonist of Metal Gear Solid. In Metal Gear Solid, he is motivated by jealousy and hatred towards Snake and his desire to surpass his "genetic destiny" from Big Boss. A younger version of him appears in Metal Gear Solid V: The Phantom Pain, dubbed the White Mamba (ホワイトマンバ, Howaito Manba). Liquid Snake is voiced by Banjō Ginga in Japanese and by Cam Clarke in English. The White Mamba is voiced by Yutaro Honjo in Japanese and by Piers Stubbs in English.

=== Raiden ===
Raiden (雷電), real name Jack (ジャック, Jakku), is a former child soldier during the Liberian Civil War. He is the main protagonist of Metal Gear Solid 2: Sons of Liberty, fighting against Solidus Snake's terrorists to save the hostages from Big Shell. Raiden reappears in Metal Gear Solid 4: Guns of the Patriots as the third Cyborg Ninja, and returns as the protagonist of Metal Gear Rising: Revengeance. Raiden is voiced by Kenyu Horiuchi in Japanese and by Quinton Flynn in English.

=== Solidus Snake ===
Solidus Snake (ソリダス・スネーク, Soridasu Sunēku), also known by the public identity of George Sears (ジョージ・シアーズ, Jōji Shiāzu), is the third and perfect son of Big Boss. After being alluded to as the president of the United States in Metal Gear Solid, he makes his first official appearance as the main antagonist of Metal Gear Solid 2: Sons of Liberty, with a design based on Yoji Shinkawa's thoughts about how Solid Snake would look when older, and the adoptive father of Raiden. During Sons of Liberty, Solidus turns against the Patriots and poses as Snake while instigating a terrorist takeover of the Big Shell with Revolver Ocelot and Olga Gurlukovich in order to form his own nation to leave his impact on the world. In combat, Solidus wears a powered suit outfitted with a pair of robotic tentacles known as "snake arms" and wields an FN P90 submachine gun and a pair of katana blades nicknamed "the Democrat" (民主刀, Minshutou) and "the Republican" (共和刀, Kyouwatou). Solidus tries to kill Raiden to use his foster son's nano-machines to lead him to the Patriots, but Raiden severely injures Solidus in their duel atop Federal Hall National Memorial, slicing into the spine of Solidus's powered exoskeleton with a high-frequency blade, and Solidus seemingly dies from his injuries after falling off the building. In Metal Gear Solid 4, Solidus's brain-dead body is used for Big Boss's reconstruction and as a decoy used by Liquid Ocelot to hack into the Patriots' AI.

In 2012, GamesRadar featured him and Liquid Snake in the second place on the list of the evilest clones in gaming, writing, "as evil clones go, the ones that threaten the world with thermonuclear war and eradication rank as some of the worst." Solidus Snake is voiced by Akio Ōtsuka in Japanese and John Cygan in English.

=== Zero ===
Zero (ゼロ), real name David Oh (デイビッド・オウ, Deibiddo Ō), also known as Major Zero and Major Tom, is the overarching antagonist of the Metal Gear series.

Introduced in Metal Gear Solid 3, he is a former member of the British Special Air Service who serves as the FOX unit's commanding officer. In Portable Ops, Zero is arrested by the Pentagon for the FOX unit's revolt, but is exonerated afterwards. Peace Walker reveals Zero to be the leader of the Cipher organization, which secretly controls the United States. Metal Gear Solid 4 reveals Zero's fallout with Big Boss over the "Les Enfants Terribles" project, which caused his control over the world through AIs that would become the Patriots. In the game, he appears as a centennial in a persistent vegetative state (due to Skull Face's parasite as revealed in Metal Gear Solid V), and is killed after Big Boss cuts off his oxygen supply and places him in a chokehold.

In Japanese, Zero is voiced by Banjō Ginga. In English, Zero is voiced by Jim Piddock in Metal Gear Solid 3 and by Time Winters in Metal Gear Solid V.

=== Kazuhira Miller ===
Benedict Kazuhira Miller (ベネディクト・カズヒラ・ミラー, Benedikuto Kazuhira Mirā), also known as McDonnell Benedict Miller (マクドネル・ベネディクト・ミラー, Makudoneru Benedikuto Mirā; "McDonnell Miller" in Metal Gear 2), Master Miller (マスター・ミラー, Masutā Mirā), and Kaz, is a mercenary and a survival coach.

Introduced in Metal Gear Solid: Peace Walker, he is the second-in-command in the Militaires Sans Frontières mercenary group. He is the son of a United States officer and Japanese woman, who previously served in the JSDF. Unlike Big Boss, Kaz is initially characterized as idealistic, believing in MSF's idea of a nation for soldiers free of political ideology. However, he is naïve in underestimating Cipher and assuming that he can maintain a business relationship with Zero's organization.

In Metal Gear Solid V, he has lost his left leg and right arm. Following Cipher's destruction of MSF, Miller is embittered after seeing the concept of a nation for soldiers appropriated by other groups and reduced to being mercenary bands before Venom Snake rescues him from Soviet forces, enabling him to help with the Diamond Dogs mercenary group's expansion. Miller is distrusting of those affiliated with Cipher, accusing them of betrayal and calling for their deaths, and takes little satisfaction with vengeance on Skull Face, but believes in Diamond Dogs' cause. However, his faith is shaken following the revelation that Big Boss used a body double, leading him to reject Big Boss.

In his later years, Miller works for FOXHOUND while serving as Solid Snake's mentor in Metal Gear 2 before being murdered for Liquid Snake's identity theft in Metal Gear Solid.

Benedict Miller is voiced by Tomokazu Sugita in Japanese and by Robin Atkin Downes in English.

=== Huey ===
Dr. Emmerich (エメリッヒ博士, Emerihhi-hakase), nicknamed Huey (ヒューイ, Hyūi), is a scientist and Hal Emmerich's father. Dr. Emmerich was the son of a Manhattan Project scientist. He was born on the day of the Hiroshima bombing with an abnormal spine, rendering him paraplegic.

In Metal Gear Solid: Peace Walker, Huey and Strangelove build the Peace Sentinels' AI weapons for Hot Coldman and MSF's own Metal Gear ZEKE for Naked Snake. In a personal letter he writes to Strangelove and asks Snake to deliver, it is revealed that they worked together at NASA and Huey expressed interest in Strangelove. The two later marry and have a son, Hal.

He remains with Big Boss during Metal Gear Solid V: Ground Zeroes, working to hide MSF's nuclear capabilities from the United Nations. He is present when MSF is attacked by the XOF forces, though Metal Gear Solid V: The Phantom Pain confirms that Emmerich managed to escape and developed a cybernetic lower exoskeleton to walk again. Emmerich maintains that he was misled by Cipher and abducted to work on the new model Metal Gear Sahelanthropus in Afghanistan for Skull Face, where he is rescued and detained by Diamond Dogs. He resumes his work for Diamond Dogs, but faces interrogation and lingering doubts about his allegiances, coming to view Diamond Dogs as being no different from Coldman or Cipher. Emmerich is accused by Diamond Dogs of murdering Strangelove when she objected to using Hal for testing, and of facilitating the attack on MSF for Cipher in exchange for his own safety; he is subsequently found guilty of triggering a new mutation in the vocal cord parasites that results in Venom Snake being forced to execute his own men. As punishment, Snake chooses to exile Emmerich from Diamond Dogs and sends him away in a lifeboat, and he is forced to dump his exoskeleton into the water to prevent the lifeboat from sinking.

Years later, Huey takes a second wife, Julie Danziger. Upon learning that Julie was sexually abusing Hal, he commits suicide by drowning himself in their pool, nearly killing her daughter Emma in the process.

Huey is characterized by his insecurity, greed, deceptiveness, self-delusion, and selfishness, with many of his claims of innocence being contradicted by his actions. Interviews and extra material by Hideo Kojima further clarified that Huey was indeed a traitor and war criminal who, despite his claims of innocence, knew the plans of Hot Coldman and Skull Face.

Huey is voiced by Hideyuki Tanaka in Japanese and by Christopher Randolph in English.

=== Venom Snake ===
Venom Snake (ヴェノム・スネーク, Venomu Sunēku), also known as Punished Snake (パニッシュド・スネーク, Panishudo Sunēku) and Big Boss' phantom, is Big Boss's body double. He is an unnamed combat medic in Metal Gear Solid V: Ground Zeroes and the player character in Metal Gear Solid V: The Phantom Pain. In 1975, he was among the Militaires Sans Frontières private forces. During a helicopter extraction at a U.S. Naval prison facility in Cuba, he removes a time bomb within Pacifica Ocean which he shields Big Boss from, resulting in the loss of his left hand and fragments of bones, teeth, and a large piece of shrapnel lodged within his cerebral cortex. They fall into a coma for nine years and are transferred to a hospital in Cyprus, where he is subjected to Zero's subconscious brainwashing and facial reconstruction as a mental doppelgänger who awakens in 1984 and draws attention away from Big Boss. Snake takes command of the Diamond Dogs mercenary unit as revenge for fallen comrades with a "Mother Base" near the Seychelles, with Kazuhira Miller and Revolver Ocelot as advisers. Snake engages in missions in Afghanistan and Central Africa as he recruits several companions and deals with the Cipher organization's remnants, ultimately confronting Skull Face and the XOF strike force, as well as Huey Emmerich and the White Mamba. Some time later, he receives a cassette tape labeled "Operation Intrude N313", which he plays on a Sony BitCorder device connected to a HiTBiT MSX2 computer before he is killed by Solid Snake in Outer Heaven (during the first Metal Gear). Venom Snake is voiced by Akio Ōtsuka in Japanese and by Kiefer Sutherland in English.

== Introduced in Metal Gear ==
=== Dr. Madnar ===
Dr. Drago Pettrovich Madnar (ドラゴ・ペトロヴィッチ・マッドナー, Dorago Petorovitchi Maddonā; known as Dr. Petrovich in the original Metal Gear and Dr. Pettrovich Madnar in the MSX2 version of Metal Gear 2) is an Eastern engineer. In Metal Gear, he is the creator of the TX-55 Metal Gear mecha and TX-11 Arnold androids and one of the hostages Snake must rescue along with his daughter Ellen (エレン, Eren). In Metal Gear 2, after being rejected by the scientific community, he defects to Zanzibar Land and develops Metal Gear D. He comes in contact with Solid Snake while posing as a hostage, but attacks him after the truth is revealed. He is mentioned in Metal Gear Solid 4 as the scientist who saved Raiden's life after he was turned into a cyborg.

A character with the same name plays a supporting role in Kojima's adventure game Snatcher, though the English version for the Sega CD spells his name as Dr. Petrovich Modnar.

=== Kyle Schneider ===
Kyle Schneider (カイル・シュナイダー, Kairu Shunaidā; known as Schneider in the original Metal Gear) is the leader of a resistance movement against Outer Heaven in Metal Gear, who helps Solid Snake as a radio contact alongside fellow resistance members Diane (ダイアン, Daian) and Jennifer (ジェニファー, Jenifā). He discovers the identity of Outer Heaven's leader, but is silenced before he can mention his name. In Metal Gear 2, Schneider appears under the guise of Black Ninja (ブラック・ニンジャ, Burakku Ninja; Black Color (ブラック・カラー, Burakku Karā) in the original MSX2 version), a high-tech ninja serving Zanzibar Land and the first boss of the game. Snake defeats him, but does not learn his true identity until he collapses. He then reveals to him that NATO led a bombing raid against Outer Heaven, not caring about the war orphans or refugees living there. Before dying, he tells him that Big Boss forgave the resistance for being against him and rescued as many people as he could from the bombings.

== Introduced in Metal Gear 2: Solid Snake ==
=== Kio Marv ===
Dr. Kio Marv (キオ・マルフ, Kio Marufu) is a Czechoslovak biotechnologist and creator of OILIX, a new algae species which could produce petroleum-grade hydrocarbons with little expense and effort. After presenting the algae to the World Energy Conference in Prague, he was heading to a demonstration in the United States when soldiers from Zanzibar Land kidnapped him. Roy Campbell brings Solid Snake out of retirement and sends him to Zanzibar Land to rescue Dr. Marv, but finds that he died of torture in his cell and left behind the OILIX documents for him to find.

=== Holly White ===
Holly White (ホーリー・ホワイト, Hōrī Howaito; Horry White in the original MSX2 version) is an American freelance journalist and undercover CIA operative. The daughter of a French mother and an English father, she became interested in literature at an early age and was awarded the Pulitzer Prize for her coverage in Afghanistan and an Emmy Award for her documentary Unknown Bloodstream. Her newfound fame attracted the attention of the CIA, and she infiltrates Zanzibar Land as a journalist and to aid Solid Snake.

=== Gustava Heffner ===
Gustava Heffner (グスタヴァ・ヘフナー, Gusutava Hefunā; Natasha Marcova (ナターシャ・マルコバァ, Natāsha Marukobaa) in the MSX2 version of Metal Gear 2), is a former professional figure skater who competed in the world championships and the 1988 Winter Olympics. However, she was stripped of her competition rights after being caught attempting to seek political asylum in Canada with Frank Jaeger, seeking to redeem herself by joining the StB. She is escorting Dr. Marv to America when Zanzibar Land agents hijack their plane. Later in the game, she joins Solid Snake in rescuing Dr. Marv, but dies after Jaeger destroys the bridge she is on.

=== George Kasler ===
George Kasler (ジョージ・ケスラー, Jōji Kesurā; George Kesler in the MSX2 version) is FOXHOUND's strategist and advisor, who served with mercenaries from South Africa and the French Foreign Legion and had a short stint in negotiation and combat intelligence-gathering. He is also a veteran of the 1997 Mercenary War of Independence in Zanzibar Land, where he fought the CIS Army. Kasler's service has earned him a reputation in the mercenary community; only mercenaries who have worked with him can be truly recognized as the best in the world.

=== Johan Jacobsen ===
Johan Jacobsen (ヨハン・ヤコブセン, Yohan Yakobusen; Yozev Norden (ヨゼフ・ノルデン, Yozefu Noruden) in the MSX2 version) is a zoologist specializing in the preservation of endangered species, who has been acquainted with Dr. Madnar since they were in college. He is the vice-president of the Worldwide Animal Rights Federation and works for the science magazine Maxwell, and is in Zanzibar Land studying indigenous animals.

== Introduced in Metal Gear Solid ==
=== Meryl Silverburgh ===
Meryl Silverburgh (メリル・シルバーバーグ, Meriru Shirubābāgu) is based on a supporting character of the same name in Hideo Kojima's earlier game Policenauts (1994), with Kojima adopting her name, likeness, voice actress (Kyoko Terase) and other characteristics due to his personal love for the character. Meryl's partner in Policenauts, Dave Forrest, shares Snake's given name, Dave (David), and, in the final scenes of Metal Gear Solid, Meryl wears an orange vest similar to the one Forrest wears in Policenauts. Character designer Yoji Shinkawa stated that the staff purposely avoided mentioning her directly in the first sequel to Metal Gear Solid so that it could follow either of the two endings from the first game.

The daughter of Roy Campbell's brother, Matt Campbell, who died during the Gulf War, she was born into a house of military traditions and trained herself in the 'arts' of soldiery. She admired FOXHOUND, viewing its heyday as when her uncle and Solid Snake were members, and joined the armed forces after graduating high school, undergoing psychotherapy to prevent attraction to the opposite sex. After being recruited by U.S. military unit Next-Generation Special Forces (Genome Soldiers), in 2005, she was assigned to Shadow Moses Island as an emergency replacement after several soldiers went missing. Upon arriving on the island, the unit involved with the exercise and members of FOXHOUND revolted and took over the island's nuclear disposal site, along with the Metal Gear REX being developed there. When she refused to join the mutiny, she was imprisoned along with ArmsTech President Kenneth Baker, but escaped after stealing Johnny's uniform and disguising herself as a guard, during which she met Snake and began working with him. After FOXHOUND member Sniper Wolf captures her, Snake fights her in a sniping duel before being lured into an ambush and captured. He is then put through a series of torture trials by Revolver Ocelot, with the player's actions determining Meryl's fate. If the player successfully completes the section, Snake rescues a wounded Meryl and they escape, allowing Roy and Mei Ling to fake their deaths. However, if the player submits to the torture, Snake discovers that Meryl died during her imprisonment and leaves her body to be buried by the collapsing structure with REX's remains. When Snake informs Campbell of Meryl's death, Campbell reveals that she was his biological daughter, conceived from an affair between him and his sister-in-law, which was kept secret from her biological parents. The fictional publication In the Darkness of Shadow Moses by Nastasha Romanenko, included as a bonus feature with Metal Gear Solid 2: Sons of Liberty, states that Snake and Meryl escaped together.

In Metal Gear Solid 4: Guns of the Patriots, she is the commander of Rat Patrol Team One (RAT PT 01), a division of the United States Army Criminal Investigation Command sent to investigate Liquid Ocelot's private military company activities. She has learned that Roy Campbell is her true father, but resents him due to the circumstances of her conception and his marriage with Rosemary. However, she reconciles with him by the end of the game. She initially dislikes her subordinate Johnny due to his clumsiness and stomach problems, but forgives him after learning that he does not have nanomachines in his body, later falling in love with and marrying him. She also appears in Metal Gear Online as a playable character.

Meryl Silverburgh is voiced by Kyoko Terase in Japanese and by Debi Mae West in English.

=== Naomi Hunter ===
Naomi Hunter (ナオミ・ハンター, Naomi Hantā), called Dr. Naomi (ドクター・ナオミ, Dokutā Naomi) by her staff, is a geneticist by practice who specializes in nanotechnology-based gene therapy.

In Metal Gear Solid, she is the chief of FOXHOUND's medical staff and part of the support crew assembled to assist Solid Snake, providing him with information on the FOXHOUND members he faces. Being Gray Fox's adopted sister, she seeks revenge on Snake for nearly killing him during the original Metal Gear games. After being instructed to inject Snake with the FOXDIE virus, she secretly modifies it so that it will kill him at a random moment in addition to its original programming. Over the course of the game, Naomi realizes that some of her original perceptions of Snake were wrong and feels remorse for modifying the virus. Uncertain of when the FOXDIE would kill, Naomi tells Snake to live life to the fullest before he dies. Afterwards, Nastasha Romanenko's account reveals that Naomi was briefly arrested following the Shadow Moses incident until she escaped.

In Metal Gear Solid 4, Naomi works with Liquid Ocelot to hijack the Sons of the Patriots battlefield control system before allying with Snake. She becomes romantically involved with Otacon and forms a friendship with Sunny. Upon returning to Shadow Moses, Naomi reveals that she has been diagnosed with terminal cancer and, guilt-ridden over her past mistakes, commits suicide by disabling the nanomachines that were keeping it in check.

Naomi Hunter is voiced by Hiromi Tsuru in Japanese and by Jennifer Hale in English.

=== Mei Ling ===
Mei Ling (美玲(メイ・リン), Mei Rin) is a Chinese-American data analyst.

In Metal Gear Solid, she is in charge of saving the player's progress. She invented Snake's wireless communication system, the codec radio, and the Soliton Radar, which detects the positions and field of vision of nearby enemy soldiers. Each time Snake saves his data, Mei Ling provides him with advice through Chinese proverbs, as well as quotations from Western authors. In the Japanese version, Mei Ling only quoted Chinese proverbs: she would cite the original proverb in Chinese and then explain its meaning to Snake in Japanese. According to Kojima, this made some of the proverbs redundant after translating them to English, since Mei Ling would be saying the same thing twice.

In Metal Gear Solid 2, Mei Ling is part of Philanthropy and assists in stealing equipment from the SSCEN, with Snake fearing for her safety. She makes a voiced cameo in the game as an easter egg during the Tanker chapter after the player has saved their progress thirteen times. In Metal Gear Solid 4, Mei Ling commands the museum-turned-training vessel USS Missouri and provides Snake and Otacon with backup through her connections with the SSCEN.

Outside of the main Metal Gear series, she is a central character in the radio drama adaptation of Metal Gear Solid and appears in the Game Boy Color spinoff Metal Gear: Ghost Babel, as well as one of Snake's support crew members in Super Smash Bros. Brawl and Super Smash Bros. Ultimate.

Mei Ling is voiced by Houko Kuwashima in Japanese and by Kim Mai Guest in English.

=== Johnny Sasaki ===
Johnny Sasaki (ジョニー佐々木, Jonī Sasaki) is a recurring character.

First appearing in Metal Gear Solid, he is a guard whose uniform is stolen by Meryl Silverburgh. Though unnamed in the main game, he is named in the credits, with his surname coming from the game's character model designer, Hideki Sasaki. According to the developers' commentary in Metal Gear Solid: Integral, Hideki was known among the staff for his slackoff behavior and was included in the game as a running gag.

Johnny makes voiced cameos in Metal Gear Solid 2. In an early version of the game's story, his full name was Johnny Sasaki Slater (ジョニー・佐々木・スレイター, Jonī Sasaki Sureitā) and was a spy for the Patriots who would die from a pacemaker malfunction after coming into contact with Raiden. During the game, Raiden can hear Johnny talking using a directional mic in Big Shell.

In Metal Gear Solid 4, Johnny is known as Akiba (アキバ) and is a member of Meryl's Rat Patrol Team 01, with him and Meryl assisting Snake in Outer Haven by allowing him time to reach the server room. It is revealed that he had been in love with Meryl since he first saw her at Shadow Moses, and they marry each other in the epilogue. Unlike other soldiers in the Army and PMCs, Johnny does not have nanomachines due to his trypanophobia causing him to avoid the injections. While this has caused him to have frequent spells of colds, diarrhea and poor combat performance compared to his squad mates, he is immune to Liquid Ocelot's ability to directly attack soldiers' nanomachines. He also appears in the first Metal Gear Online expansion as a playable character.

Johnny Sasaki is voiced by Naoki Imamura in Japanese and by Dean Scofield in English. Akiba is voiced by Jun Fukuyama in Japanese and by Beng Spies in English.

=== Sons of Big Boss ===
The Sons of Big Boss are a splinter group of FOXHOUND that appear in Metal Gear Solid. Led by Liquid Snake, they serve as the game's bosses.

==== Psycho Mantis ====
Psycho Mantis (サイコ・マンティス, Saiko Mantisu) is a psychic expert for Liquid Snake's FOXHOUND unit in Metal Gear Solid. Following the collapse of the Soviet Union, he came to America in search of a job and worked with the KGB and the FBI before joining FOXHOUND. His special abilities include the psychic powers of psychokinesis and telepathy, which in a fourth wall-breaking scene allows him to identify certain games on the player's memory card and "move" the controller by making it vibrate. Due to being disgusted with his father's inner thoughts, he burned down his own village and started despising people. He also claims to be able to read the future, but this is implied through telepathy to predict his opponents' moves rather than clairvoyance. Mantis encounters Solid Snake twice; the first time, he takes control of Meryl Silverburgh's mind, and the second time he is killed after being unable to predict Snake's actions when the player uses the second controller port. His predictions also seem to be susceptible to change, as he states that Snake has a large place in Meryl's heart, but cannot see if their futures lie together.

In Metal Gear Solid 4, the original Mantis appears after Screaming Mantis's defeat, attempting to "read your mind" as before, but is unable to do so due to the advanced systems. He then tries to manipulate the controller, which, depending on the controller vibration available, either fails and infuriates him or succeeds and makes him scream in delight before he vanishes. Drebin later reveals that the Beauty and the Beast Corps had been under the control of Mantis.

The character's first chronological appearance is in Metal Gear Solid V: The Phantom Pain, where he is known as Tretij Rebenok (トリーチェゴ・レビョンカ, Torīchego Rebyonka; Третий ребёнок "The Third Child"). As a child, he was identified by Soviet researchers and taken to a facility in Moscow, where he was influenced by the Man on Fire's desire for revenge before they escaped and began working with Skull Face. He can detect electromagnetic currents running between the synapses of the brain and is particularly sensitive to feelings of anger, hatred and a desire for revenge. These feelings manifest in the physical world as a representation of those emotions, but he is easily overwhelmed by these emotions and becomes a slave to the will of who is expressing them. Throughout the story, he identifies these feelings as being strongest in the White Mamba and their relationship becomes symbiotic, magnifying his power and allowing the White Mamba to take control of Metal Gear Sahelanthropus. Once Snake disables Sahelanthropus, the boy steals a sample of a weaponized parasite designed to target English language speakers and passes it on to the White Mamba.

Psycho Mantis was polled as the 8th "Greatest Video Game Villain of All Time" by IGN and his boss battle being the 2nd Greatest Moment in Gaming. In Japanese, Psycho Mantis has been voiced by Kazuyuki Sogabe (in Metal Gear Solid), Hiroshi Yanaka (in Metal Gear Solid: Digital Graphic Novel) and Shōzō Iizuka (in Metal Gear Solid 4). In English, Psycho Mantis is voiced by Doug Stone.

==== Sniper Wolf ====
Sniper Wolf (スナイパー・ウルフ, Sunaipā Urufu) is a member of FOXHOUND and an elite sniper, who wields a Heckler & Koch PSG1 and uses mercury-tipped hollow-point bullets to poison her victims. She is also addicted to the drug diazepam.

Born in present-day Iraqi Kurdistan around 1983, during the Iran–Iraq War, when she was five years old, she witnessed the death of her family and thousands of others from a chemical attack by Saddam Hussein's government troops against the rebellious Kurds. She was captured by Saddam's forces and taken as an orphan by the Iraqi Ministry of Interior, who brainwashed her and had a Gurkha sniper train her to be a child soldier for the government. Three years later, during the 1991 uprisings in Iraq, she fled to a Kurdish refugee camp, where Big Boss noticed her abilities and brought her with him to the United States, where she received counselling and deprogramming to remove her brainwashing. Out of gratitude, she followed him until his mutiny and death at the hands of FOXHOUND operative Solid Snake. She was then found by Liquid Snake, who convinced her to join a FOXHOUND splinter cell under his command.

In Metal Gear Solid, Sniper Wolf and Liquid Snake's group go rogue during the Shadow Moses Island incident, taking hostages and blackmailing the U.S. government with a hijacked walking tank while demanding that Big Boss' corpse be handed over to them. She cares for the huskies that Liquid intended to kill, as she enjoys their company. When Solid Snake infiltrates the island, Sniper Wolf wounds Meryl to lure him into a trap, capturing him so he can be tortured by Revolver Ocelot. After Snake defeats her in a sniper duel, he hears her life story and desire to be "set free" and kills her despite objections by Otacon, who professes his love for her. Snake also uses her handkerchief to avoid attacks by her wolves by masking his scent with hers. Sniper Wolf's ghost can be seen if the player uses the in-game photo camera on her body.

Sniper Wolf was originally planned to make a voice-over cameo appearance in Metal Gear Solid 2: Sons of Liberty during a conversation between Otacon and Olga Gurlukovich, but does ultimately appear in a flashback sequence. Her spirit appears as a wolf in Metal Gear Solid 4: Guns of the Patriots, in which Crying Wolf engages in a sniper duel against Old Snake. Her costume can also be developed for Quiet in Metal Gear Solid V: The Phantom Pain.

A special Sniper Wolf character card appears in the non-canon spin-off game Metal Gear Acid 2 (2005). Other developers have also given homage-type nods to the character, such as with the "MGS Sniper Wulf Mk. II" item in EA Montreal's Army of Two and an "MG-S1 Sniper Wolfe" weapon in the PlayStation 3 version of Visceral Games' The Godfather II.

A 1/8 scale Sniper Wolf action figure was released by McFarlane Toys in 1998. Two 1/6 scale figures were also released only in Japan by Yamato (an action figure) and Studio Saru Bunshitsu (a garage kit). In 2012, Sniper Wolf was chosen by Konami as one of their 64 iconic characters to participate in the Konami E3 Battle event, where she lost against Metal Gear REX in the semi-final fourth round. A "bishōjo statue" designed by Shunya Yamashita and based on Shinkawa's original picture was released by Kotobukiya in 2016.

Sniper Wolf is voiced by Naoko Nakamura in Japanese and by Tasia Valenza in English.

==== Vulcan Raven ====
Vulcan Raven (バルカン・レイブン, Barukan Reibun) is an Inuk member of FOXHOUND, who wields a giant Vulcan cannon and has shamanic powers of intuition. He is able to discern Solid Snake's heritage and was present in Outer Heaven prior to his involvement at Liquid Snake's FOXHOUND unit. He fights Snake twice, first in an M1 Abrams tank, and second in a freezer with Raven before being killed. Before he dies, he leaves behind a cryptic message of Snake's violent future before his body is completely devoured by ravens. Vulcan Raven is voiced by Yukitoshi Hori in Japanese and by Peter Lurie in English.

==== Decoy Octopus ====
Decoy Octopus (デコイ・オクトパス, Dekoi Okutopasu) is a member of FOXHOUND who specializes in impersonation, injecting the blood of those he impersonates into his own body for a more "perfect" disguise. Along with the rest of his unit, he went rogue during the Shadow Moses island incident. While impersonating Donald Anderson, he lies to Solid Snake about having the DARPA chief's detonation code found out by Psycho Mantis and informs Snake of the PAL override system before being killed by the FOXDIE virus. In Japanese, Decoy Octopus is voiced by Masaharu Sato. In English, Decoy Octopus is voiced by Greg Eagles in Metal Gear Solid and by James C. Mathis III in Metal Gear Solid: Digital Graphic Novel.

=== Donald Anderson ===
Donald Anderson (ドナルド・アンダーソン, Donarudo Andāson) is a chief advisor associated with DARPA. In his younger years, the character appears as Sigint (シギント, Shiginto), a technical advisor of FOX that provides Zero with technical support for Naked Snake in Metal Gear Solid 3: Snake Eater, and can be recruited into the early FOXHOUND in Portable Ops. In his later years, he abuses his position as the DARPA chief while conspiring with Kenneth Baker and Jim Houseman, before he is tortured for information by Revolver Ocelot who killed him, and impersonated in the original Metal Gear Solid games by Decoy Octopus and Olga Gurlukovich. Additionally, Anderson contributed to Cipher's technology, which oversees the AI proxies that would control governments and military as the Patriots. Donald Anderson has been voiced by Keiji Fujiwara in Japanese and by James C. Mathis III in English.

=== Nastasha Romanenko ===
Nastasha Romanenko (ナスターシャ・ロマネンコ, Nasutāsha Romanenko; Насташа Романенко) is an agent of the U.S. Defense Intelligence Agency and an expert on nuclear topics. She was born in the Ukrainian SSR and was ten years old when the Chernobyl disaster took place. In Metal Gear Solid and its GameCube remake Metal Gear Solid: The Twin Snakes, she is Solid Snake's contact on matters related to nuclear weapons. After the game's events, her character writes an autobiography titled In the Darkness of Shadow Moses: The Unofficial Truth and forms the anti-Metal Gear proliferation group Philanthropy with her profits. This fictional publication is included as a bonus feature in Metal Gear Solid 2. Nastasha Romanenko is voiced by Eiko Yamada in Japanese and by Renee Raudman in English.

=== Kenneth Baker ===
Kenneth Baker (ケネス・ベイカー, Kenesu Beikā) is the president of the arms company ArmsTech. which takes part in the Metal Gear REX project alongside Donald Anderson under the United States' black budget. In Metal Gear Solid, he is taken prisoner by FOXHOUND and tortured by Revolver Ocelot before Solid Snake finds him. After giving away his detonation code to Ocelot, he is killed by the FoxDie virus and nearly tells the truth about Snake's mission, but dies before he can finish his sentence. In Japanese, Kenneth Baker is voiced by Yuzuru Fujimoto. In English, Kenneth Baker is voiced by Allan Lurie in Metal Gear Solid and by Peter Renaday in Metal Gear Solid: Digital Graphic Novel.

=== Jim Houseman ===
Jim Houseman (ジム・ハウスマン, Jimu Hausuman) is the United States Secretary of Defense who observes the situation on Shadow Moses Island during Metal Gear Solid aboard an AWACS command plane. In the ending, he orders that the Shadow Moses base be bombed, partially out of spite over the death of Donald Anderson. According to In the Darkness of Shadow Moses, he commits suicide following the events of the game, but Nastasha Romanenko suggests that he was murdered. Jim Houseman is voiced by Tomohisa Asō in Japanese and by William Bassett in English.

== Introduced in Metal Gear Solid 2: Sons of Liberty ==
=== Rosemary ===
Rosemary (ローズマリー, Rōzumarī), also known as Rose (ローズ, Rōzu), is Raiden's significant other.

Introduced during the Plant chapter portion of Metal Gear Solid 2, she is employed by the army as a data analyst and saves the player's progress over Codec. Rosemary also supports Raiden by providing information about the Big Shell facilities and characters he encounters. Raiden and Rose spend most of their conversations talking about their relationship, which is based on Kojima's real life experiences. By the end of the game, Rosemary reveals herself to be a spy for the Patriots. She is then taken off the mission and replaced by an AI duplicate of her. After the final battle, Raiden is reunited with the real Rose, who is pregnant with his child, in front of Federal Hall National Memorial.

In Metal Gear Solid 4, Rosemary appears as a psychological counselor in a combat stress platoon, offering Snake tips on dealing with stress. Though she was engaged to Raiden, their relationship ended after Rosemary supposedly had a miscarriage. Rosemary later marries Roy Campbell. In reality, Rosemary successfully gave birth to Raiden's child John; her marriage is a ploy to protect him from the Patriots by having Campbell pose as John's father. After she reveals the truth to Raiden, the couple reconciles.

Rosemary does not appear in Metal Gear Rising: Revengeance, but Raiden mentions that she and their son are living in New Zealand.

In Japanese, Rosemary is voiced by Kikuko Inoue. In English, Rosemary is voiced by Lara Cody in Metal Gear Solid 2 and Metal Gear Solid 4 and by Kari Wahlgren in Metal Gear Solid 2: Digital Graphic Novel.

=== Olga Gurlukovich ===
Olga Gurlukovich (オルガ・ゴルルコビッチ, Oruga Gorurukobitchi; Ольга Гурлукович) is a member of her father's mercenary unit during Metal Gear Solid 2. Her character was based on Meryl, though Kojima wanted to make her look like a professional rather than a rookie. She first appears in the Tanker chapter as a member of the Gurlukovich mercenary unit and its sole boss character. She takes over her father's unit after her father's death in the Tanker chapter, lending her team to Solidus Snake's Sons of Liberty terrorist faction. She is actually an unwilling agent for the Patriots, who are holding her daughter hostage, and assists Raiden as the second Cyborg Ninja dubbed Mr. X, simulating Gray Fox and Donald Anderson. In doing so, she betrays her comrades to ensure her child's safety, a realization that causes her guilt. She is later shot and killed by Solidus. Olga Gurlukovich is voiced by Kyoko Terase in Japanese and by Vanessa Marshall in English.

=== Dead Cell ===
Dead Cell is a black-ops unit introduced in Metal Gear Solid 2 that serves as its bosses. Formed by Solidus Snake, Dead Cell's original purpose was to prepare military bases for surprise attacks by holding unannounced training sessions.

==== Fortune ====
Fortune (フォーチュン, Fōchun), real name Helena Dolph Jackson (ヘレナ・ドルフ・ジャクソン, Herena Dorufu Jakuson), is the leading member of Dead Cell and a member of Solidus Snake's Sons of Liberty terrorist group seen in Metal Gear Solid 2. She is an African-American woman with blond hair, which was requested by Shinkawa as he thought she would be appealing. She wields a railgun and her codename comes from her ability to have bullets pass by her without hitting her. Fortune confronts Raiden as the first boss in the Plant chapter, though she cannot truly be defeated due to her powers. The fight ends when Vamp arrives and is seemingly killed by Raiden, which makes her temporarily lose her will to fight until Vamp revives. Her true motive is to seek revenge against Solid Snake, whom she believes was responsible for her father's death on board the Discovery tanker. Near the end of the game, she learns that Revolver Ocelot killed her father, and Ocelot reveals that her immunity to bullets was simply the result of an electromagnetic force field surrounding her body, which he deactivates before shooting her. However, Fortune manages to psychically deflect Ocelot's attacks from Metal Gear RAY before dying, with Snake hinting that her power as "Lady Luck" was not completely fake. Fortune is voiced by Yumi Tōma in Japanese and by Maura Gale in English.

==== Vamp ====
Vamp (ヴァンプ, Vanpu) is a member of Dead Cell from Romania. He is a knife-throwing specialist who possesses various vampire-like abilities and attributes, such as an ability to walk on walls and run across water, which was based on a character that was scrapped. His moniker has a dual meaning, being a shortened form of vampire as well as referring to his bisexual orientation. Vamp was originally designed as a woman, but when Fortune was introduced, the design was changed to that of a man. However, his long black hair was retained, with the finished model being based on Joaquín Cortés.

First appearing in Metal Gear Solid 2, he is part of Solidus Snake's Sons of Liberty terrorist group during the Plant chapter. Over the course of the game, he confronts Raiden and is seemingly killed, but manages to survive. In Metal Gear Solid 4, Vamp's "immortality" is revealed to be caused by nanomachines in his body that augment his natural healing abilities. He appears as a member of Liquid Ocelot's private army and as Raiden's rival. After Naomi Hunter designs a syringe used to destabilize the functionality of nanomachines, Vamp uses it to kill himself and end his suffering.

Vamp was added to the second expansion of Metal Gear Online as a playable character. In Japanese, Vamp is voiced by Ryotaro Okiayu in Metal Gear Solid 2 and Metal Gear Solid 4 and by Shinya Tsukamoto in Metal Gear Solid 2: Digital Graphic Novel. In English, Vamp is voiced by Phil LaMarr.

==== Fatman ====
Fatman (ファットマン, Fattoman) is a member of Dead Cell who specializes in explosives and wields a Glock 18. Shinkawa had trouble designing Fatman, as he had been requested to make him both obese and good-looking.

He is the second boss character in the Plant chapter of Sons of Liberty, where Raiden must deactivate a series of C4 charges planted within the struts surrounding the Shell 1 core. However, the explosives are revealed to be dummy bombs serving to activate the real bomb in the basement of Strut A, and a similar bomb planted in the basement of the Shell 2 Core detonates, killing Fatman's former mentor Peter Stillman. As Raiden meets with him, Fatman reveals that he wishes to become the world's most famous bomber by surpassing Stillman. Fatman then challenges Raiden to a duel at the heliport atop Strut E, resulting in his death. It is later revealed that Fatman was an agent of The Patriots and that Stillman's presence in the facility was arranged to motivate Fatman into participating.

The character is named after the bomb dropped on Nagasaki, Japan. Fatman is voiced by Kōzō Shioya in Japanese and by Barry Dennen in English.

=== Sergei Gurlukovich ===
Colonel Sergei Gurlukovich (セルゲイ・ゴルルコビッチ, Serugei Gorurukobitchi; Сергей Гурлукович) is Olga Gurlukovich's father and Revolver Ocelot's former commanding officer, who provided Liquid Snake with a Hind-D helicopter in Metal Gear Solid in exchange for the possible usage of Metal Gear REX. An officer in Russia's Spetsnaz and GRU, he leads his personal team of mercenaries to seize the Discovery during the Tanker chapter of Metal Gear Solid 2 and hijack Metal Gear RAY. During the operation, Gurlukovich is betrayed and killed by Ocelot due to the Patriots wanting RAY for their cause. Sergei Gurlukovich is voiced by Osamu Saka in Japanese and by Earl Boen in English.

=== Scott Dolph ===
General Scott Dolph (スコット・ドルフ, Sukotto Dorufu) is the commandant of the Marine Corps and Fortune's father. In the Tanker chapter of Metal Gear Solid 2, he is in charge of transporting Metal Gear RAY to its testing site and gives a speech to his troops in the cargo holds, unaware that the ship is being hijacked. He is killed by Revolver Ocelot before hijacking RAY, his death serving as the root of Fortune's sorrow. In Japanese, Scott Dolph is voiced by Daisuke Gori. In English, Scott Dolph is voiced by Kevin Michael Richardson in Metal Gear Solid 2 and by Phil LaMarr in Metal Gear Solid 2: Digital Graphic Novel.

=== Peter Stillman ===
Peter Stillman (ピーター・スティルマン, Pītā Sutiruman) is a former NYPD bomb disposal expert working for the Bund Patrol and the former mentor of Fatman, having taught him about explosives. In Metal Gear Solid 2, he infiltrates the Big Shell facility with SEAL Team 10. After Fatman has planted bombs within the struts in the Big Shell facility, Stillman provides Raiden and Solid Snake with the tools needed to track down and deactivate them while providing support through codec. He eventually learns that the explosives Fatman planted were decoys used to activate the real bombs before dying after the bomb in the basement detonates.

In Japanese, Peter Stillman is voiced by Shōzō Iizuka. In English, Peter Stillman is voiced by Greg Eagles in Metal Gear Solid 2 and by James C. Mathis III in Metal Gear Solid 2: Digital Graphic Novel.

=== Richard Ames ===
Colonel Richard Ames (リチャード・エイムズ, Richādo Eimuzu) is a Secret Service agent and an operative for the Patriots. He previously served the Defense Intelligence Agency and met Nastasha Romanenko, who he was married to until their divorce. He was taken hostage during the Big Shell incident. In Metal Gear Solid 2, he meets Raiden and is threatened by Revolver Ocelot before dying from an apparent heart attack. It is later revealed that he died from his nanomachines deactivating his pacemaker due to a virus imitating FOXDIE put in place by the Patriots. Richard Ames is voiced by Masaharu Satō in Japanese and by Peter Renaday in English.

=== James Johnson ===
James Johnson (ジェームズ・ジョンソン, Jēmuzu Jonson) is the President of the United States during Sons of Liberty. He is the primary hostage Raiden is sent to rescue in the Plant chapter. After Raiden meets the President in the core of Shell 2, he reveals that he was a willing accomplice in the terrorist act, his vital signs being the input codes to activate Arsenal Gear, but was imprisoned after a conflict of interest with Solidus Snake, as Johnson wanted power and he wanted to rebel. After he reveals the truth about Arsenal Gear to Raiden, he learns that he was manipulated to revolt by the Patriots as part of the "S3 Plan". He is then killed by Revolver Ocelot while arguing with Raiden to prevent the terrorists from launching a nuclear strike. In Japanese, James Johnson is voiced by Yuzuru Fujimoto. In English, James Johnson is voiced by Paul Lukather in Metal Gear Solid 2 and by H. Richard Greene in Metal Gear Solid 2: Digital Graphic Novel.

=== Emma Emmerich ===
Emma Emmerich Danziger (エマ・エメリッヒ・ダンジガー, Ema Emerihhi Danjigā), nicknamed E.E., is an AI programmer and the stepsister of Hal Emmerich. When Emma was a child, her mother Julie Danziger married Dr. "Huey" Emmerich. After learning that Julie was sexually abusing Hal, Huey committed suicide by drowning in the family's swimming pool, dragging Emma with him. Though Emma survived, she developed a fear of water and became estranged from Hal, blaming him for not trying to save her and then leaving the family.

During the Plant chapter of Metal Gear Solid 2: Sons of Liberty, she is in charge of developing the AI that controls Arsenal Gear. Raiden escorts her to the Shell 1 Core computer room to download a virus into the GW AI system and prevent the terrorists from using it, but Vamp ambushes her on the oil fence. Raiden snipes Vamp, but before falling into the sea, Vamp stabs Emma in the stomach. She later dies in the computer room, confessing how she wanted to be closer to her stepbrother. Emma Emmerich is voiced by Maria Yamamoto in Japanese and by Jennifer Hale in English.

== Introduced in Metal Gear Solid 3: Snake Eater ==
=== Sokolov ===
Dr. Nikolai Stepanovich Sokolov (ニコライ・ステパノヴィッチ・ソコロフ, Nikorai Sutepanovitchi Sokorofu; Николай Степанович Соколов) is a rocket scientist who, two years prior to the game's events, defected to the United States before being sent back to the USSR as a secret addition to the negotiations for ending the Cuban Missile Crisis. He develops the Shagohod. During Naked Snake's retrieval of Sokolov, Colonel Volgin recaptures him and forces him to complete the weapon, and he later seemingly dies of torture off-screen for trying to escape. He returns in Portable Ops as the informant Ghost (ゴースト, Gōsuto). After escaping to the United States with help from FOX's new commander Gene, he builds the first Metal Gear, a quadrupedal model, while assisting Big Boss because of the danger the Metal Gear RAXA poses. He can also be recruited into the early FOXHOUND team. Nikolai Sokolov is voiced by Naoki Tatsuta in Japanese and by Brian Cummings in English.

=== The Boss ===
The Boss (ザ・ボス, Za Bosu), also known as The Joy (ザ・ジョイ, Za Joi), is Naked Snake's mentor and mother figure, Ocelot's biological mother, and one of the main antagonists of Metal Gear Solid 3: Snake Eater. After apparently defecting to the Soviet Union, she forces Naked Snake to kill her in a duel. It is revealed by EVA at the end of Snake Eater that The Boss's defection was a ploy to acquire the "Philosopher's Legacy" cache from Volgin's possession. However, Volgin's impromptu use of a Davy Crockett on Soviet soil led the United States government to turn The Boss into a scapegoat to avoid escalating the Cold War. The Boss is voiced by Kikuko Inoue in Japanese and by Lori Alan in English.

=== Volgin ===
Colonel Yevgeny Borisovitch Volgin (エヴゲニー・ボリソヴィッチ・ヴォルギン, Evugenī Borisovitchi Vorugin; Евгений Борисович Волгин), also known as "Thunderbolt" in the West, is a Stalinist GRU colonel and the other main antagonist of Metal Gear Solid 3: Snake Eater. His body carries an electric charge of ten million volts, which is speculated by Soviet scientists to be the result of electrokinesis, that he uses for fighting and torture. He is sadistic and enjoys inflicting pain and destruction, being one of the chief perpetrators behind the 1940 Katyn Forest Massacre.

During Snake Eater, Volgin conspires to use the Shagohod as part of a bid to seize control of the Soviet Union by deposing Nikita Khrushchev. In the story's climax, he pilots Shagohod and engages Naked Snake and EVA in a fight to the death. After being critically wounded, it begins to rain and he is struck by a bolt of lightning, leaving him comatose and nearly dead. After being retrieved and experimented on by Russian scientists, Volgin returns as the Man on Fire (燃える男, Moeru Otoko) in Metal Gear Solid V: The Phantom Pain, where he desires revenge for his defeat, a desire that kept him alive and which his form is a physical manifestation of. His appearance enables him to convert the energy from firearms and explosive rounds into powerful attacks. However, he eventually dies peacefully following a final confrontation, where it is implied that he deduced that Venom Snake is not the target of his vendetta.

Volgin is voiced by Kenji Utsumi in Japanese and by Neil Ross in English. In English, the Man on Fire is voiced by Dave Fouquette.

=== EVA ===
EVA (エヴァ) is Naked Snake's lover and Solid Snake's mother.

She first appears in Metal Gear Solid 3: Snake Eater, as a supposed KGB female spy and a former NSA codebreaker who defected to the Soviets along with ADAM and uses her charm and good looks to win over the trust of Naked Snake and the Soviet enemies. EVA intends to kill Major Ocelot to avoid revealing her cover, but Snake stops her. Later, she infiltrates Colonel Volgin's GRU base under the guise of Tatyana (タチアナ, Tachiana), Sokolov's supposed lover, and assists Snake; "Tatyana" is tortured by Volgin with electric shocks in order to coerce Sokolov into completing the Shagohod's development. During their missions, EVA and Snake began to develop feelings for one another and she helps him destroy the Shagohod, kill Volgin, and reach the Philosophers' Legacy so she can steal it. Volgin nearly kills her until The Boss volunteers to execute her personally, and after completing the mission, EVA and Snake have a one-night stand. However, she cannot bring herself to assassinate him and flees with half of the Philosophers' Legacy and intelligence data that would lead to the breakthrough in the Chinese nuclear weapons program. Soon after, Snake discovers a tape EVA left behind that details her secrets. The epilogue states that EVA disappeared in Hanoi, North Vietnam, during the Vietnam War in 1968.

She appears in Metal Gear Solid: Portable Ops as a recruitable character after completing a series of optional missions. In 1971, Big Boss and EVA reconcile after she was tracked down and rescued in Hanoi, and she was invited to become a founding member of a shadow government along with Zero, Para-Medic, Sigint, and Ocelot. At some point, she also discovered Ocelot's codename of ADAM, and the two reconciled. In 1972, EVA volunteered to serve as a surrogate mother in the "Les Enfants Terribles" project, despite Big Boss's disapproval of Zero's methods. She was originally implanted with eight clone fetuses, though six were aborted in order to encourage stronger growth in the remaining two: Solid Snake and Liquid Snake. EVA does not directly appear in Metal Gear Solid: Peace Walker, but remains in contact with Big Boss and gives cassette tape recordings to Militaires Sans Frontieres in 1974 that detail The Boss's final mission and the motivations behind her actions. She was entrusted to pass this on to Big Boss, and he eventually receives them.

In Metal Gear Solid 4: Guns of the Patriots, which is set in 2014, she appears, under the identity of Big Mama (ビッグ・ママ, Biggu Mama) (also called Matka Pluku, Czech for "Mother of the Regiment"), as the leader of the Paradise Lost Army resistance movement against Liquid Ocelot. It is revealed that she was fired from her job as a spy after failing her mission. She assists Snake in Eastern Europe and is injured during a chase after her motorcycle crashes, nearly burning to death. Snake saves her from Liquid Ocelot's gunshot, but the left side of his face is badly burnt in the process. She later dies from her injuries, though it is later revealed that the mutated FOXDIE virus carried in Snake's body killed her.

In Metal Gear Solid V: The Phantom Pain, EVA is tasked with arranging Big Boss's confinement at a hospital in Cyprus after XOF's attack on Mother Base.

EVA and Olga Gurlukovich's outfits can be used as costumes in Rumble Roses XX. EVA also makes a cameo appearance in Super Smash Bros. Brawl as an obtainable sticker, usable by Solid Snake in The Subspace Emissary.

EVA's character model was based by Hideo Kojima on a gravure idol he liked ("○○里", a possible reference to Chisato Morishita (森下 千里)), while her personality traits were inspired by Fujiko Mine from Lupin III. He also said: "On Eva's back are signs of torture. There are burn marks and cut marks, as well as some very old scars. The Colonel interrogated her with 'hentai play' (変態プレイ)." According to Kojima, EVA's character was disliked by the English voice actors for her personality.

In 2007, Tom's Games included her among the 50 greatest female characters in video game history, proposing that she should be portrayed in a live-action adaptation by "Uma Thurman, because she's tall, blonde and built to kick ass." In 2011, 1UP.com instead proposed Gillian Jacobs, adding that "EVA proved herself as one of the games' smartest and craftiest characters, playing heroes and villains alike like oversized flesh fiddles." The scene between the "sexy" EVA, Snake, and Ocelot in Metal Gear Solid 3 was ranked as fifth on the 2010 list of the most Metal Gear amazing cutscenes by Joystick Division. EVA was chosen as "the perfect one to top the list" of the "PlayStation 2 babes" by Chris Reiter of Gaming Target in 2005.

In Japanese, EVA is voiced by Misa Watanabe in Metal Gear Solid 3: Snake Eater, Metal Gear Solid: Portable Ops and Metal Gear Solid: Peace Walker, and Mari Natsuki in Metal Gear Solid 4: Guns of the Patriots. In English, EVA is voiced by Jodi Benson (credited as "Suzetta Miñet") in Metal Gear Solid 3: Snake Eater and Metal Gear Solid: Peace Walker, Vanessa Marshall in Metal Gear Solid: Portable Ops, and Lee Meriwether in Metal Gear Solid 4: Guns of the Patriots.

=== Para-Medic ===
Para-Medic (パラメディック, Paramedikku), also known as Dr. Clark (クラーク博士, Kurāku-hakase), is a FOX support team member that provides medical information. As Snake Eater is set before the modern use of the word "paramedic", her codename instead comes from a portmanteau between "parachute" and "medic". Para-Medic provides Naked Snake with information in Metal Gear Solid 3 and can later be recruited into the early FOXHOUND team in Portable Ops. Later games reveal that Para-Medic was the head of the "Les Enfants Terribles" project, and was responsible for Gray Fox's revival before being murdered by the first Cyborg Ninja. Originally, many believed that Dr. Clark was a man, which is later explained to be due to her secrecy concealing many details about her. Para-Medic is voiced by Houko Kuwashima in Japanese and by Heather Halley in English.

=== Cobra Unit ===
The Cobra Unit is The Boss's personal team of military specialists, who serve as the bosses of Metal Gear Solid 3. Each member is named after the primary emotion that they bring into battle.

==== The Pain ====
The Pain (ザ・ペイン, Za Pein) has the ability to control hornets through the buzzing of a queen hornet that he keeps in his backpack and wields a Tommy gun and grenades. He can use these hornets to shield himself and create a body double to confuse and draw his opponents into the open. The Pain is voiced by Hisao Egawa in Japanese and by Gregg Berger in English.

==== The Fear ====
The Fear (ザ・フィアー, Za Fiā) is a member of the Cobra unit known for his superhuman speed and agility and fearsome appearance. Capable of dislocating his joints at will, he has enhanced mobility and wields two crossbows, the Little Joe and the William Tell, coating their bolts in the venom of the Brazilian wandering spider, setting them on fire, or outfitting them with explosives. He uses a variety of wires and ropes to enhance his mobility and stealth camouflage to make himself nearly invisible. At the beginning of his battle in Metal Gear Solid 3, he shoots Naked Snake in the leg with a poisoned crossbow bolt, but wants to kill him himself rather than let the venom do the job for him. Though the poison begins to make Snake hallucinate, he manages to defeat him. The Fear is voiced by Kazumi Tanaka in Japanese and by Michael Bell in English.

==== The End ====
The End (ジ・エンド, Ji Endo) is a member of the Cobra unit with exceptional sniping skills, born in the early 1860s, and the only member of the unit without an emotion-based codename, though it is explained in the game that it signifies "true oblivion". The End is a venerable expert sniper, but is vulnerable because of his age. However, he is capable of photosynthesizing sunlight to sustain himself and can go for days without food or water, which is explained in The Phantom Pain as the effect of a species of parasite that lives in his body. He has a pet Alexandrine parakeet who can alert him to Snake's presence. The End is the only member of the Cobras who will not kill the player under any circumstances; he only uses tranquilizing rounds and will throw Snake in a jail cell if he is defeated. The strategic sniper fight between Naked Snake and The End in Metal Gear Solid 3 was developed by Kojima, who wanted to bring a completely new style of boss battle to the series. However, the fight can be avoided if Snake kills a defenseless The End shortly beforehand, or if the player saves during the fight and waits a week or sets the system clock a week ahead, in which case The End dies of old age. In Peace Walker, The End's voice can be heard over the Codec during ghost missions, and Snake comments during mission briefings asking Kazuhira Miller if he saw any parrots with the enemy snipers and scouts.

The End is voiced by Osamu Saka in Japanese and by J. Grant Albrecht in English.

==== The Fury ====
The Fury (ザ・フューリー, Za Fyūrī) is a pyromaniac and former Soviet cosmonaut. He utilizes a flame-resistant Soviet space suit in conjunction with a jet pack and a powerful flamethrower, powered by the liquid rocket fuel UDMH. His codename reflects the unmitigated fury he feels towards the world while he is fighting. The Fury is voiced by Masato Hirano in Japanese and by Richard Doyle in English.

==== The Sorrow ====
The Sorrow (ザ・ソロー, Za Sorō) was a spirit medium and former member of the Cobra unit who used his psychic powers to aid his fellow soldiers on the battlefield. After being romantically involved with The Boss, he was the father of her child. After the ideological rift created by the Cold War, loyalties changed, with him and The Boss each taking their respective sides. The Boss reluctantly killed him in 1962 for making a double agent out of a sleeper agent she sent to OKB-1 to gather data on the USSR's space program. He makes many hidden appearances in ghost form throughout the game's cutscenes. In Metal Gear Solid 3, after escaping from Groznyj Grad and suffering a near-death experience, Naked Snake encounters The Sorrow while being forced to wade through an endless river swarming with the enemies that Snake has killed up to that point. The Sorrow is voiced by Yukitoshi Hori in Japanese and by David Thomas in English.

=== Raikov ===
Ivan Raidenovitch Raikov (イワン・ライデノヴィッチ・ライコフ, Iwan Raidenovitchi Raikofu; Иван Райденович Райков) is a high-ranking officer within Groznyj Grad, he is Volgin's trusted major, or often referred as Volgin's favorite and has colonel-class authority despite having a rank of major. The player is able to wear a mask to impersonate him, as Kojima noted that there were fans who wanted to play as Raiden in Metal Gear Solid 3. Besides impersonating Raikov, Naked Snake is required to incapacitate him and take his uniform to infiltrate Groznyj Grad, with the player also being given the choice of killing him. According to Kojima, the reason why he left Raikov's fate up to the player was largely because of Raiden's controversial popularity. Raikov appears as a secret character in Portable Ops, having been exiled to Colombia by the Soviet military after the fallout of Operation Snake Eater runs him afoul of the Kremlin.

Raikov is voiced by Kenyu Horiuchi in Japanese and by Charlie Schlatter in English.

=== Aleksandr Granin ===
Aleksandr Leonovitch Granin (アレクサンドル・レオノヴィッチ・グラーニン; Александр Леонович Гранин) is the director of OKB-812, also known as the Granin Design Bureau, and came up with the concept of bipedal walking tanks. He supplies Naked Snake with the key to the door near the warehouse before being killed by Volgin. Aleksandr Granin is voiced by Takeshi Aono in Japanese and by Jim Ward in English.

=== Johnny ===
Johnny is a GRU soldier assigned to watch over Naked Snake's jail cell in Groznyj Grad. Due to having an estranged son with the same name in America and claiming that all the first-born sons in his family are given that name, he is implied to be the grandfather of Johnny Sasaki. Johnny is voiced by Naoki Imamura in Japanese and by Michael Gough in English.

=== CIA Director ===
The Director of Central Intelligence is the one who planned Operation Snake Eater, leading Naked Snake to refuse to shake his hand during the award ceremony after returning from the mission. He also employed Ocelot as a triple agent within the CIA, KGB and GRU. In the end of Metal Gear Solid: Portable Ops, Ocelot betrays the DCI under orders from a new employer and kills him in order to obtain the location of the Philosopher's Legacy. In Japanese, the DCI is voiced by an uncredited actor in Metal Gear Solid 3 and by Masaharu Sato in Portable Ops. In English, the DCI is voiced by Paul Collins in Metal Gear Solid 3 and by Jesse Corti in Portable Ops.

=== DOD Official ===
A DOD official appears at the end of Metal Gear Solid 3: Snake Eater, where he talks to the DCI during Big Boss's award ceremony. He bears the likeness of Robert McNamara, though was rewritten to be the Army Chief of Staff in Metal Gear Solid: Peace Walker. He makes an unvoiced appearance in the end of Metal Gear Solid: Portable Ops, where he attends FOXHOUND's inauguration ceremony. In Peace Walker, he is now the Chairman of the Joint Chiefs of Staff and contacts Big Boss when Peace Walker relays false nuclear launch data. He is the only member at the DEFCON meeting who believes Big Boss when told that the nuclear launch data is false after the latter provides proof, but is held at gunpoint by the other executive members when he orders them to stand down from retaliating. Despite this, Big Boss succeeds in stopping a retaliation strike from being launched.

== Introduced in Metal Gear Solid: Portable Ops ==
=== Jonathan ===
Jonathan (ジョナサン, Jonasan) is one of the Red Army soldiers stationed at the San Hieronymo base and the first of the enemy soldiers to be recruited by Naked Snake's early FOXHOUND group. After meeting Snake and Roy Campbell, Jonathan says that the Red Army personnel were assigned to build the base as an alternate strategic missile site after the Cuban Missile Crisis; détente and the USSR's commitment to the SALT negotiations resulted in the abandonment of the base, leading the soldiers to join Gene. Jonathan is left impressed with Snake's idealism and helps in treating Campbell's bout with malaria. As Gene manipulates the Soviet soldiers into killing each other, Jonathan dies in Snake's arms after protecting him from bullets, shaping the ideals and principles that he came to uphold as Big Boss. Jonathan is voiced by Takahiro Fujimoto in Japanese and by Robin Atkin Downes in English.

=== Skowronski ===
Colonel Skowronski is a commander of the Red Army base in San Hieronymo and World War II veteran and former fighter pilot. Naked Snake finds him hiding aboard a ship in the harbor that housed his fighter plane collection. It is revealed that he had been drinking after Gene's men took over the base and turned his Red Army troops against him. Skowronski dies in an attempt to kill Gene using RAXA; after it shuts down, Ursula telekinetically removes him from the cockpit and drops him to his death. Colonel Skowronski is voiced by Tetsu Inada in Japanese and by Nick Jameson in English.

=== Python ===
Python (パイソン, Paison) is one of FOX's original members, who worked alongside Naked Snake during the early stages of the United States' advisory effort in Vietnam. However, he was severely injured during a mission with the Civilian Irregular Defense Group, losing the ability to regulate his body temperature. The United States government operated on him to stabilize his body temperature, eventually putting him in a Sneaking Suit filled with liquid nitrogen, with several needles in his head to vent excess heat. The CIA uses him as a counterpart to Snake in case he rebelled. Python allies with the player if he is defeated by non-lethal means, but will burn to death if he is killed. Python is voiced by Yûsaku Yara in Japanese and by Dwight Schultz in English.

=== Elisa and Ursula ===
Elisa (エルザ, Eruza) and Ursula are split personalities of a teenage girl raised in East Germany to nuclear physicists who worked in the USSR. She is revealed to be a survivor of the 1957 Kyshtym disaster, with the radioactive fallout triggering her psychic abilities, and underwent numerous ESP and psychic tests after returning to East Germany. The testing enabled her to create split personalities that people can mistake as twins due to their different hair colors: Elisa has gold hair, while Ursula's hair is silver. Gene rescued her during a mission in 1966 and trained her personas – Elisa in medicine and Ursula in combat abilities. Over the course of the game, Elisa helps Naked Snake. However, Ursula appears during Snake's showdown with Metal Gear RAXA and attempt to Gene, resulting in "their" deaths. Elisa and Ursula are voiced by Saori Gotō in Japanese and by Tara Strong in English.

=== Cunningham ===
Lt. Cunningham (カニンガム, Kaningamu) is an African-American soldier and FOX's resident interrogation specialist, who goes by the codename Boa. After losing his leg and getting demoted to desk work by the CIA, the Department of Defense taps him to besmirch the CIA's reputation, a job he accepted due to desiring revenge for his demotion. This enables him to join Gene's revolt and interrogate Naked Snake about the Philosophers' Legacy. Snake defeats him upon learning of the DOD's plans, with his flying platform exploding shortly thereafter, although not before he attempts to destroy the base with a Davy Crockett round so Snake dies with him. Cunningham is voiced by Daisuke Gori in Japanese and by Noah Nelson in English.

=== Gene ===
Gene (遺伝子, Idenshi) is the commander of FOX and the main antagonist of Metal Gear Solid: Portable Ops. Having joined the unit under the codename Viper, he proves his worth by rescuing Sokolov and Elisa during missions to Eastern Europe. A doctor by trade and possessing political science knowledge, he undermines Major Zero's authority while preparing his own rebellion. Gene participates in the Successor Project, a special program designed to create a military officer modeled after The Boss and highly educated in military strategy and tactics. The program results in Gene having developed enhanced CQC abilities and mild telepathic powers of persuasion. Naked Snake kills him after Gene reveals his plans behind the takeover of the San Hieronymo base. Recognizing Snake's combat skills, Gene bequeaths to Snake the resources he amassed for the military force Army's Heaven. Gene is voiced by Norio Wakamoto in Japanese and by Steven Blum in English.

== Introduced in Metal Gear Solid 4: Guns of the Patriots ==
=== Sunny ===
Sunny Emmerich (サニー・エメリッヒ, Sanī Emerihhi) is a gifted prodigy and Olga Gurlukovich's biological daughter, kidnapped at birth by the Patriots to manipulate her mother. After rescuing her from the Patriots, Raiden left her in Otacon's care. By the events of Metal Gear Solid 4, she is a gifted computer programmer, with her status as a prodigy implied to be the result of genetic engineering experiments she underwent at Area 51 while in captivity. She and Naomi Hunter design the FOXALIVE virus, which Snake uses to disable the Patriots' AIs. Sunny returns in Metal Gear Rising: Revengeance, having been adopted by Otacon. She attended school after becoming free of the Patriots' influence, but was considered too "advanced"; after earning multiple degrees, she was hired by Solis Space & Aeronautics. She helps Raiden reach Pakistan to stop Armstrong's plans, later allowing Bladewolf and George to work with her at Solis. Sunny is voiced by Kikuko Inoue in Japanese and by Cristina Pucelli in English.

=== Drebin 893 ===
Drebin (ドレビン, Durebin) is a Ugandan weapons launderer accompanied by his pet monkey Little Gray. He was the sole survivor of his family in one of the Patriots' proxy wars, and later kidnapped by the Lord's Resistance Army and raised as a child soldier. He was eventually recruited by the Patriots and placed into the "Drebin" gun laundering company. In Metal Gear Solid 4, he assists Snake by disabling ID-tagged weapons taken from PMC troops under orders from the Patriots to help him defeat Liquid Ocelot. To this end he injected Snake with nanomachines that allowed him to use his weapons, as well as a new strain of FOXDIE programmed to kill EVA, Ocelot, and Big Boss, though this strain also replaced Snake's old FOXDIE strain previously injected by Naomi and would only last as long as he lived, preventing him from becoming a biological hazard. He also provides exposition on the origins of the Beauty and the Beast members. Drebin also drank cola due to alcohol quickly being processed by his nanomachines and him wanting a similar sensation, but after the Patriots' downfall, he began drinking again due to the nanomachines being disabled. Drebin was voiced by Keiji Fujiwara in Japanese and by Khary Payton in English.

=== Jonathan ===
Jonathan (ジョナサン, Jonasan) is a Korean-American who serves as the Rat Patrol team's heavy weapons specialist. His name is a reference to the lead character of Policenauts. Jonathan is voiced by Hideyuki Tanaka in Japanese and by James Sie in English.

=== Ed ===
Ed (エド, Edo) is an African-American who serves as the Rat Patrol team's sniper and Meryl Sliverburgh's second-in-command. He is a tribute to the Policenauts character of the same name. Ed is voiced by Shōzō Iizuka in Japanese and by Dave Fennoy in English.

=== The Beauty and the Beast Corps ===
The Beauty and the Beast Corps (ビューティー＆ビースト部隊, Byūtī & Bīsuto Butai) are a team of female PMC operatives in mechanized suits seen in Metal Gear Solid 4. Designed according to their animal designations, each member of the BB Corps features the likeness of a different real-life supermodel. Their "beast" form is voiced by Shōzō Iizuka in Japanese and by Fred Tatasciore in English.

==== Laughing Octopus ====
Laughing Octopus (ラフィング・オクトパス, Rafingu Okutopasu) wears a special cybernetic suit that can imitate the appearance of her surroundings or other people. She was born and raised in a small Scandinavian hamlet known as the Devil's Village, where the residents habitually eat octopus. After a nearby cult took offense to the village's diet, they attacked the village and tortured her into killing her entire family while laughing. This numbed her to bloodshed and spawned an obsession with laughter, particularly during battle. The character's likeness was provided by Lyndall Jarvis. Laughing Octopus is voiced by Haruna Aimoto in Japanese and by Paula Tiso in English.

==== Raging Raven ====
Raging Raven (レイジング・レイヴン, Reijingu Reivun) is capable of flight, utilizing UCAVs and a grenade launcher to attack her enemies. Born in Aceh, Indonesia, she was taken as a prisoner of war as a child. After months of torture and starvation, her captors abandoned the prison, leaving her and the other child prisoners to be eaten alive by ravens. She was the last living child, though instead of eating her, the ravens pecked away her restraints. After finding her captors' base camp, she killed the soldiers and civilians there. The character's likeness was provided by Yumi Kikuchi. Raging Raven is voiced by Yumi Kikuchi in Japanese and by Nika Futterman in English.

==== Crying Wolf ====
Crying Wolf (クライング・ウルフ, Kuraingu Urufu) is the strongest member, who attacks with a railgun or sheer brute force. She also possesses a strong sense of smell, allowing her to identify and track her quarry by scent in a snowstorm. She was born in an unnamed country ripped by civil war. After her family was killed in an attack, she fled the village with her baby brother and became a refugee. When hiding from an enemy unit in a shack, her brother began to cry and she accidentally killed him after covering his mouth to silence him. Upon reaching a refugee camp, she was driven insane by both her grief and the cries of children and experienced visions of a wolf killing the children of the camp, when in reality she was responsible for doing so. The character's likeness was provided by Mieko Rye. Crying Wolf is voiced by Eriko Hirata in Japanese and by Debra Wilson in English.

==== Screaming Mantis ====
Screaming Mantis (スクリーミング・マンティス, Sukurīmingu Mantisu) is the group's leader who can levitate or crush people at will, as well as manipulate soldiers to do her bidding. When she was young, she got trapped in a room adjacent to a torture chamber while attempting to escape death in her unknown, war torn, South American country. Unable to escape, she was driven mad by the constant screams of the tortured nearby. She has two puppets shaped like Psycho Mantis and The Sorrow, with Psycho Mantis's puppet controlling living people and The Sorrow's puppet controlling dead bodies. However, her powers only affect people implanted with nanomachines and do not affect those who can suppress nanomachine activity. It is also revealed that Psycho Mantis was controlling her mind as a result of her insanity. The character's likeness was provided by Scarlett Chorvat. Screaming Mantis is voiced by Mao Yuki in Japanese and by Andrea Zafra in English.

== Introduced in Metal Gear Solid: Peace Walker ==
=== Amanda ===
Amanda Valenciano Libre (アマンダ・バレンシアノ・リブレ, Amanda Barenshiano Ribure) assumed command of the FSLN after her father, their previous leader, was killed. After many of her members were forced out of Nicaragua by government forces, the KGB came to the Sandinistas' aid by having them operate a banana plantation as a front for drug-trafficking operations to generate funds for their rebel activities. During Metal Gear Solid: Peace Walker, Amanda shows a romantic interest in Naked Snake when Snake frees the Sandinista survivors from the Peace Sentinels. Towards the end of the game, Amanda leads the Sandinistas into fighting the KGB. In the game, the player can use Amanda to motivate former guerrillas recruited into MSF. In Ground Zeroes, Amanda is stated to be working on MSF's Cuban operations. Amanda Libre is voiced by Romi Park in Japanese and by Grey DeLisle in English.

=== Chico ===
Ricardo Valenciano Libre (リカルド・バレンシアノ・リブレ, Rikarudo Barenshiano Ribure), nicknamed Chico (チコ, Chiko), is Amanda's younger brother. During Peace Walker, he tries to prove himself to her and the FSLN rebels despite his age. Following an argument, he wanders the forest until being captured by the Peace Sentinels. He also talks to Naked Snake about sightings of the Peace Walker AI weapon, which he calls "El Basilisco". Chico has an interest in cryptozoology, is the one who briefs Snake on Monster Hunter missions, and is in love with Paz Ortega Andrade. In Ground Zeroes, Chico is imprisoned and tortured in Camp Omega after trying to rescue Paz, and is implied through tapes to have been forced into having sex with her. He is aboard Big Boss's helicopter when it crashes into the Caribbean Sea; The Phantom Pain states that he did not survive, although, according to concept art, he was planned to appear as an adult. Chico is voiced by Kikuko Inoue in Japanese and by Antony Del Rio in English.

=== Hot Coldman ===
Hot Coldman (ホット・コールドマン, Hotto Kōrudoman) is a former director of the CIA sent to manage the CIA's Latin American operations and is one of the main antagonists in Peace Walker. Due to bitterness over his demotion, Coldman plans to use the Peace Sentinels and the Peace Walker Project to regain his status as a power player in Washington. The true reason behind his exile was because he planned Operation Snake Eater. Coldman believes that nuclear deterrence is a flawed theory, claiming that humans will not retaliate during a nuclear strike due to fear of destroying themselves. He also believes that, with impartial artificial intelligence, Peace Walker would guarantee retaliatory nuclear strikes against any nuclear power, ensuring true deterrence and worldwide peace. Coldman dies after being shot by Zadornov, but not before inputting Peace Walker's nuclear launch codes and leaking false data to NORAD of an impeding USSR nuclear strike against the United States. However, he is proven wrong, as senior members of NORAD planned to retaliate against the USSR. Coldman is voiced by Mugihito in Japanese and by H. Richard Greene in English.

=== Zadornov ===
Vladimir Aleksandrovich Zadornov (ヴラジーミル・アレクサンドロヴィチ・ザドルノフ, Vurajīmiru Arekusandorovitchi Zadorunofu; Владимир Александрович Задорнов) is one of the main antagonists in Metal Gear Solid: Peace Walker, who disguises himself as Ramon Galvez Mena (ラモン・ガルベス・メナ, Ramon Garubesu Mena), a professor at the University of Peace. He possesses a red bionic right hand with a built-in lighter that can be launched like a rocket. He and his student, Paz Ortega Andrade, visit the Militaires Sans Frontières' base in Colombia to recruit MSF's services, and he assists the MSF as they uncover the Peace Sentinels' motives in Costa Rica. He later unmasks himself as a KGB intelligence operative when Coldman prepares the Peace Walker to attack the MSF's Mother Base from inside a United States base in Nicaragua. Zadornov plans to use Peace Walker to launch a nuke at Cuba and blame the attack on the United States, which would lead to communism spreading throughout Central America. The MSF and FSLN capture him and incarcerate him at Mother Base, but he breaks out and forces Big Boss to recapture him before he kills him in self-defense. Vladimir Zadornov is voiced by Hōchū Ōtsuka in Japanese and by Steven Blum in English.

=== Strangelove ===
Strangelove (ストレンジラブ, Sutorenjirabu) is a British AI expert hired to work in the Peace Walker project and the mother of Hal Emmerich. During her stint with NASA in the late 1950s, she met and fell in love with The Boss. She later met Huey while working in the Mercury program. In Peace Walker, her experience with The Boss and subsequent work in ARPA inspires her to create the Mammal Pod as Peace Walker's AI matrix with The Boss's personality, which initially puts her at odds with Naked Snake. However, Strangelove later joins MSF and helps create Metal Gear ZEKE's AI matrix. In Ground Zeroes, she leaves MSF a week before the IAEA inspection notification arrived due to the AI department being free of suspicion. The Phantom Pain reveals that she retrieved the Mammal Pod to use as a basis for Zero's AI system. After she opposed Huey's attempts to use Hal as a test subject for Metal Gear Sahelanthropus, she was locked inside the Mammal Pod to suffocate. Strangelove is voiced by Yumi Kikuchi in Japanese and by Vanessa Marshall in English.

=== Cécile ===
Cécile Cosima Caminades (セシール・コジマ・カミナンデス, Seshīru Kojima Kaminandesu) is a French ornithologist. In Peace Walker, she is caught while trying to record quetzal sounds near an Incan ruin where the Peace Walker Project's AI laboratory is located. Cécile was influenced by the May 1968 events in France, similar to other Parisian women at the time. The way her name is pronounced is a play on the phrase Kojima, kami nan desu (小島、神なんです, "Kojima, he's definitely a god"). She is named after and visually based on Cécile Caminades, an employee from the Paris branch of Konami Digital Entertainment. Cécile did not appear in Ground Zeroes, as she had been evacuated from MSF and returned to Paris, France in preparation for the IAEA inspection. Cécile Caminades is voiced by Yū Kobayashi in Japanese and by Catherine Taber in English.

=== Paz ===
Paz Ortega Andrade (パス・オルテガ・アンドラーデ, Pasu Orutega Andorāde) is a schoolgirl at the University of Peace.

First introduced in Peace Walker, she is the apparent student of Ramon Galvez Mena, who recruits the Militaires Sans Frontières in Costa Rica to survey Coldman's Peace Sentinel AI experiments. In the game's true ending, she is revealed to be Pacifica Ocean, an agent of Cipher. Paz hijacks Metal Gear ZEKE and attempts to launch a nuclear warhead at the American East Coast, with the intention of framing MSF as being an extremist cult under Cipher's orders. Big Boss defeats her and she is thrown into the water from the force of ZEKE's explosion, although Big Boss suspects that she may have survived. Paz provides commentary about her deep-cover mission in a ten-part series of audio tapes called "Paz's Diary", in which she discusses life in Mother Base and her fears of a strong reprisal from Cipher if she blows her cover.

Paz returns in Ground Zeroes, where she is revealed to have survived. She is rescued by Skull Face's XOF group and brought to Camp Omega, undergoing interrogation and torture and the surgical implanting of explosive devices in her abdomen and womb. Big Boss retrieves her and Chico from the camp, believing her to be instrumental in finding and stopping Cipher. During their rescue, Big Boss and Chico discover the surgical scars from one bomb inside Paz's body, which the surgeon on the helicopter is forced to remove. While trying to escape XOF's assault on MSF, Paz reveals the second bomb before throwing herself from the helicopter in an attempt to save the others from the subsequent explosion, which kills her.

In The Phantom Pain, she seemingly survives and is brought back to Diamond Dogs, but has amnesia due to dissociative identity disorder, leading her to forget about Cipher and believe herself to still be a student in 1974. After removing a bomb from her stomach in front of Snake, he realizes that she is just a hallucination stemming from guilt over not being able to save her, and comes to terms with her death.

Paz is voiced by Nana Mizuki in Japanese and by Tara Strong in English.

== Introduced in Metal Gear Rising: Revengeance ==
=== Maverick Security Consulting, Inc. ===
A private military and security company that acts as Raiden's primary support team over the course of the game.

==== Boris Popov ====
Boris Vyacheslavovich Popov (ボリス・ヴャチェスラヴォヴィチ・ポポフ, Borisu Vyachesuravovichi Popofu; Борис Вячеславович Попов) is the president of Maverick and a former Russian Army soldier. Between the Big Shell incident and Liquid Ocelot's uprising, he helped Raiden rescue Sunny from the Patriots at Area 51, having once been friends with Sergei Gurlukovich. He later founded Maverick after the fall of the Patriots, taking in former members of Big Mama's Paradise Lost army and recruiting Raiden to their ranks. Boris Popov is voiced by Takayuki Sugo in Japanese and by JB Blanc in English.

==== Kevin Washington ====
Kevin Washington (ケビン・ワシントン, Kebin Washinton) is a military strategist who briefs Raiden on his missions and provides combat intelligence. Prior to his tenure with Maverick, he worked in disarmament, demobilization and reintegration at an NGO with ties to the United Nations, but after meeting Boris and seeing how ineffective the UN was at maintaining DDR, he left and joined Maverick. Kevin Washington is voiced by Yuichi Nakamura in Japanese and by Phil LaMarr in English.

==== Courtney Collins ====
Courtney Collins (コートニー・コリンズ, Kōtonī Korinzu) is Maverick's lead data analyst. She attended the same university as Kevin, who would later recommend Maverick to her following her graduation. Courtney Collins is voiced by Miyuki Sawashiro in Japanese and by Kari Wahlgren in English.

==== Doktor ====
Wilhelm Voigt (ヴィルヘルム・フォークト, Viruherumu Fōkuto), known as Doktor (ドクトル, Dokutoru), is a German cybernetics expert who helps construct Raiden's new cyborg body. He originally served as a walking-weapons researcher in East Germany, but was left jobless after the Berlin Wall fell. He was later hired by a prosthetics laboratory in Dortmund and rose to prominence due to his knowledge of robotics and engineering. He is brought on as an adviser to Maverick to provide information on cyborg soldiers, as well as build Raiden a new body and train him in its use. Doktor is voiced by Mugihito in Japanese and by Jim Ward in English.

=== Desperado Enforcement LLC ===
The game's main antagonist, Desperado, is a self-proclaimed PMC that conducts nefarious schemes. Many of its operatives are bionically enhanced.

==== Jetstream Sam ====
Samuel Rodrigues (サムエル・ホドリゲス, Samueru Hodorigesu) is a master of a Brazilian fighting technique called the "New Shadow School", derived from a similar Japanese fighting style. Born and raised in Brazil, he is of Brazilian-Japanese heritage. Trained in swordsmanship by his father, who was killed by a former pupil under orders from a local drug cartel, Sam inherited his "Murasama" sword and became a vigilante and mercenary before being forced into service to Desperado by Armstrong. Known by the callsigns Jetstream and Minuano, Sam is deeply involved with Desperado and has a rivalry with Raiden before dying and entrusting his sword to him. An additional chapter released as downloadable content details how Sam joined Desperado. Jetstream Sam is voiced by Hiroaki Hirata in Japanese and by Philip Anthony-Rodriguez in English.

==== Sundowner ====
Sundowner (サンダウナー, Sandaunā) is Desperado's unofficial leader and part of the Winds of Destruction, a team of elite operatives. His name comes from winds that occur in Southern California. Born into poverty in Alabama, he joined the military during early adulthood and participated in several conflicts before leaving the service to become a mercenary for various PMCs until the fall of SOP, becoming part of Desperado. He wears a series of explosive shields and wields two high-frequency machetes that combine into a giant pair of shears known as "Bloodlust". He is killed by Raiden following the latter's assault on the headquarters of World Marshal Inc., a PMC. Sundowner is voiced by Ken Nishida in Japanese and by Crispin Freeman in English.

==== Mistral ====
Mistral (ミストラル, Misutoraru) is the second member of the Winds of Destruction trio, named after the dry northern winds that blow from the Alps to the Mediterranean. Born in Algeria to French and Algerian parents, she was orphaned as a child during the Algerian Civil War, finding and murdering those responsible years later. She briefly served in the French Foreign Legion before being recruited into Desperado by Armstrong. Her cybernetic body is capable of hosting multiple limbs taken from Dwarf Gekkos. She wields a long staff made of Dwarf Gekko arms that also acts as a whip, known as "L'Etranger" ("The Stranger"). She is killed by Raiden during a mission in Abkhazia after being doused in liquid nitrogen. Mistral is voiced by Romi Park in Japanese and by Salli Saffioti in English.

==== Monsoon ====
Monsoon (モンスーン, Monsūn) is the third member of the Winds of Destruction, named after the seasonal wind systems that occur in West Africa and Australasia, in addition to being born in Cambodia. He has the ability to magnetically dislocate segments of his body to attack from a distance and wields smoke grenades and a pair of sai known as "Dystopia". His personality is that of a nihilistic, misanthropic sociopath, which is implied to be the result of trauma from Khmer Rouge's reign of terror. He is killed by Raiden during the latter's assault on World Marshal's headquarters. Monsoon is voiced by Masashi Ebara in Japanese and by John Kassir in English.

==== Blade Wolf ====
Blade Wolf (ブレードウルフ, Burēdourufu), initially known as IF Prototype LQ-84i, is an unmanned AI weapon in Desperado's arsenal. When Raiden defeats the machine, Doktor rebuilds it as Raiden's ally. After nearly being destroyed by Armstrong, it comes to live with Sunny at SOLIS. An additional chapter released as downloadable content details part of Blade Wolf's history with Desperado prior to its first encounter with Raiden. Blade Wolf is voiced by Yoshimasa Hosoya in Japanese and by Michael Beattie in English.

==== Khamsin ====
Khamsin (カムシン, Kamushin) is an unofficial fourth member of the Winds of Destruction, who appears in the Blade Wolf DLC chapter, named after a hot, dry, dusty south–north wind in North Africa and the Middle East. He was discharged from the Marines due to friction between him and his teammates, and is held in similarly low regard by Desperado. His body from the waist down is replaced with connectors to a large mech suit, and he wields a chainsaw/battle-axe. Blade Wolf is manipulated by Mistral into killing Khamsin, whom she believes to be a problem. Khamsin is voiced by Rikiya Koyama in Japanese and by Benito Martinez in English.

=== Senator Armstrong ===
Steven Armstrong (スティーヴン・アームストロング, Sutīvun Āmusutorongu) is a Colorado senator, the primary backer of Desperado and World Marshal, and the main antagonist of Metal Gear Rising: Revengeance. He seeks to be elected as president of the United States in order to rebuild it from within, purging those too weak or impoverished to contribute to society. He uses nanomachines to enhance his strength and transform parts of his skin into metallic armor, reducing the effectiveness of attacks. Though he attempts to use Metal Gear EXCELSUS to assassinate the US president in Pakistan, EXCELSUS is destroyed by Raiden, who ultimately kills him. In the Jetstream DLC, Armstrong is revealed to be the one who cut off Sam's arm. Steven Armstrong is voiced by Unshō Ishizuka in Japanese and by Alastair Duncan in English.

== Introduced in Metal Gear Solid V: Ground Zeroes and The Phantom Pain ==
=== Skull Face ===
Skull Face (スカルフェイス, Sukaru Feisu) is the main antagonist of Metal Gear Solid V: Ground Zeroes and Metal Gear Solid V: The Phantom Pain. The commander of the mysterious XOF special-forces unit, his identity and nationality are initially unknown, and he claims to have forgotten his native language, though he can speak Hungarian and is later revealed to have been born in Transylvania before it was returned to Romanian control. Unable to establish a consistent identity, Skull Face came to resent cultural imperialism and Cipher's ideology. The injuries that resulted in his appearance were sustained when a rapeseed oil factory his parents worked in was bombed on suspicion of manufacturing weapons, after which he was taken to the Soviet Union and subjected to an early form of "parasite therapy", in which parasitic organisms were introduced into his body to keep him alive. He was later infected with one of Code Talker's parasites, making it impossible for him to speak his native language. He eventually became a spy and assassin specializing in poisons, killing Joseph Stalin as revenge for the subjugation of Romania. Skull Face considers the bombing to have burned the humanity out of him, and tortures his captives to the brink of death in order to witness their hope being extinguished, believing that he can discover the source of his own hope and regain his humanity.

Initially, Skull Face became an agent of the XOF organization created by Zero to provide intel and support during missions, but grew resentful of Zero's fame while Cipher kept him in the shadows. By Ground Zeroes, he is a senior operative working on behalf of Cipher; he expresses dissatisfaction with Zero's leadership and seeks information that will lead him to Zero. As the commander of XOF, he authorizes and participates in the torture and imprisonment of Paz and Chico, later leading an assault which results in the partial destruction of Big Boss's Militaires Sans Frontières. By The Phantom Pain, Skull Face has fallen out of favor with Cipher and been exiled to Africa, where he revives a project designed to weaponize a parasite as a form of ethnic cleansing, as it targets and kills speakers of different languages. He uses the project to develop a strain of vocal cord parasite that targets English speakers, intending to unleash it against Cipher and start a new Cold War by giving easy-to-make nuclear weapons to minority groups. To do this, he activates the unfinished Metal Gear ST-84 "Sahelanthropus", but is betrayed and left crushed under a broken girder while Venom Snake neutralizes the ST-84. Skull Face accepts his defeat, apparent by his quoting of David Bowie's "Space Oddity". He is incapacitated and begs to be killed, but Snake and Kazuhira Miller shoot him, detaching his right arm and left leg, before leaving him to die. After Dr. Emmerich kills him with a gunshot, his remains are cremated when the parasites within still exhibit life signs in order to kill him for good.

Skull Face is voiced by Takaya Hashi in Japanese and by James Horan in English.

=== Quiet ===
Quiet (クワイエット, Kuwaietto) is a sniper who appears in The Phantom Pain. She is part of a team attempting to kill Big Boss when he is discovered by Cipher, but suffers severe third-degree burns and is kept alive through parasite therapy that gives her the ability to photosynthesize light, breathe through her skin, cloak herself, and move with superhuman speed and strength. After being defeated by Venom Snake in open combat, she is brought back to Mother Base and begins participating in missions with Snake. As their relationship develops, she is infected with the English-language strain of vocal cord parasites as a means of assassinating Snake, demanding her silence in order to prevent her symptoms from showing. Although the Diamond Dogs cure the infection, Quiet refuses the treatment due to her latent desire for revenge. However, following the mutation of the parasite, she realizes that her silence is not enough to prevent symptoms from spreading and allows herself to be captured by Soviet forces in Afghanistan. Though Snake rescues her, they are lost in a sandstorm as Soviet forces hunt them down, prompting Quiet to speak English to direct a helicopter to their location, awakening the parasite. After leaving a goodbye message to Snake, she disappears in the Afghan desert to prevent the infection from spreading. Dutch model Stefanie Joosten provided Quiet's likeness, motion capture, and voice.

=== Code Talker ===
Code Talker (コードトーカー, Kōdo Tōkā) is a Navajo biologist who specializes in parasite research. Born in 1880, he has survived for over a century due to his research, in which he identified and injected himself with the same species of parasite that gave The End his powers and longevity. Code Talker was ordered by Skull Face to duplicate the vocal cord parasite for use in his plan under the threat of the extermination of his people. He was later rescued by the Diamond Dogs and brought back to Mother Base to aid in finding a way to prevent or cure the parasite. Code Talker is voiced by Osamu Saka in Japanese and by Jay Tavare in English.

=== Skulls ===
The Parasite Unit (パラサイトユニット, Parasaito Yunitto), also known as the Skulls (スカルズ, Sukaruzu), are an elite force of supersoldiers working for XOF. They possess glowing turquoise eyes thanks to a strain of Code Talker's parasites, which grants them enhanced abilities at the cost of their cognitive functions; these abilities include optical camouflage, corrosive gas dispersal, shapeshifting, and rock-like metallic armor.

=== D.D. ===
D.D., short for Diamond Dog, is a trained wolf who assists Diamond Dogs in The Phantom Pain. Venom Snake finds him in Afghanistan as an orphaned puppy and brings him back to Diamond Dogs, where Ocelot trains him to provide support on missions.

== Groups and organizations ==
=== Outer Heaven ===
Outer Heaven (アウターヘブン, Autā Hebun) is the manifestation of Big Boss's ideology throughout the Metal Gear titles.

The original iteration is a nation-state that serves as the original Metal Gear game's setting, located 200 kilometers north of the Galzburg, South Africa. A mercenary financed the nation's establishment to attract disillusioned soldiers, with a massive fortress as its centerpiece. Its potential threat to world affairs is boosted with the deployment of the TX-55 Metal Gear. In the game, FOXHOUND commander Big Boss orders Solid Snake to infiltrate the mercenary state and destroy Metal Gear. After Snake defies expectations and destroys Metal Gear, the nation's apparent leader confronts Snake but is defeated, with Outer Heaven destroyed as well.

In Metal Gear 2: Solid Snake, the fortified nation of Zanzibar Land (ザンジバルランド, Zanjibaru Rando) in Central Asia declares themselves a nuclear power thanks to Metal Gear D provided by Big Boss, but his former subordinate infiltrates Zanzibar and defeats Metal Gear and Big Boss.

Subsequent concepts of the ideology continue in the first two Metal Gear Solid games, where Liquid Snake's FOXHOUND takes over Shadow Moses Island in Metal Gear Solid to threaten the world with Metal Gear REX, and Solidus Snake enacts a plan in Metal Gear Solid 2 to detonate an electro-magnetic pulse in New York to destroy the Patriots' AI systems; both plans are foiled by Solid Snake and his allies.

Outer Heaven's origins are depicted in Metal Gear Solid: Portable Ops as Naked Snake's response to Gene's "Army Heaven"; the former is given data, resources, and personnel after the latter's defeat.

A new iteration appears in Metal Gear Solid 4: Guns of the Patriots as Liquid Ocelot's mother company that runs five PMCs: Praying Mantis, Pieuvre Armement, Raven Sword, Werewolf, and Otselotovaya Khvatka thanks to a weak-spot within the Patriots' AI network. After Old Snake and Otacon use the FOXALIVE virus to destroy the Patriots, Ocelot believes that Big Boss's dream has finally been achieved.

=== FOXHOUND ===
High-Tech Special Forces Unit FOXHOUND (ハイテク特殊部隊フォックスハウンド, Haiteku Tokushu Butai Fokkusuhaundo), alternatively spelled "FOX-HOUND" or "FOX HOUND", is a US Army elite special forces unit. FOXHOUND was originally established in 1990 to cope with local revolutions, regional complications, and global terrorist activities; Metal Gear Solid 3 would later retcon the year FOXHOUND was established, stating in the ending timeline that FOXHOUND was established in 1971. The unit specializes in black ops, carrying out top-secret operations within "unauthorized" combat zones that are too politically sensitive to intervene in through conventional means. In the MSX2 versions of Metal Gear and Metal Gear 2, FOXHOUND members are often referred to as "FOX HOUNDERS", although this term fell into disuse in later versions.

In the original Metal Gear, FOXHOUND has Big Boss as the team's commanding officer while Solid Snake and Gray Fox serve as field operatives. However, Big Boss betrays the unit by the end of the game. In Metal Gear 2: Solid Snake, Roy Campbell goes from the unit's executive officer to the new commanding officer, while drill instructor Master Miller and military strategist George Kasler form part of Solid Snake's support crew in the game.

The FOXHOUND unit turns rogue in Metal Gear Solid as the Sons of Big Boss (ビッグ・ボスの息子たち, Biggu Bosu no Musuko-tachi) under Liquid Snake's leadership (Revolver Ocelot, Psycho Mantis, Sniper Wolf, Vulcan Raven and Decoy Octopus), involved in a terrorist revolt on Shadow Moses Island in hopes of threatening the world with Metal Gear REX as a second "Outer Heaven". However, they are defeated/killed by Solid Snake with help from Otacon, the Cyborg Ninja, and Meryl Silverburgh. The unit is subsequently disbanded; however, Raiden believes himself to be in the service of a new version in Metal Gear Solid 2 under the command of an AI facsimile of Campbell controlled by the Patriots, and Meryl Silverburgh wears FOXHOUND's shoulder sleeve insignia in Metal Gear Solid 4 as the leader of Rat Patrol Team One (ラットパトロールチームワン, Ratto Patorōru Chīmu Wan), composed of Johnny, Ed and Akiba.

Outside of the Metal Gear series, FOXHOUND is mentioned in Snatcher as a military unit that JUNKER Chief Benson Cunningham previously served, and in Policenauts as Meryl's former unit.

=== The Patriots ===
The Patriots (愛国者達, Aikokushatachi), also referred to as the La-li-lu-le-lo (らりるれろ, Rarirurero), are a secret cabal that controls the United States. The group is initially believed to be led by an inner circle of twelve people known as the Wisemen's Committee (賢人会議, Kenjin Kaigi).

In Metal Gear Solid 2, the Patriots manipulate the story's events. During the Tanker incident, they begin a smear campaign against Snake to frame his organization Philanthropy for an oil tanker's destruction in New York. During the Big Shell incident, Solidus Snake leads the Sons of Liberty (自由の息子達, Jiyū no Musuko-tachi), consisting of Revolver Ocelot, Olga Gurlukovich and the Dead Cell members, to take over Arsenal Gear. As it houses the AI GW to censor the flow of digital information as a third "Outer Heaven", they plan to use the Metal Gear RAY on New York to trigger an electromagnetic pulse and permanently destroy the Patriots' AI systems. However, the Patriots manipulated agents to ensure their demise by Solid Snake and Raiden. Philanthropy later acquires a disk containing the identities of the Wisemen's Committee and learns that its members have been dead for "about a hundred years".

Metal Gear Solid 4 revealed that the Patriots were created from Zero's paranoia in the form of four computer AIs: TJ, TR, AL and GW, controlled by a fifth proxy AI, JD. The AIs were originally created to carry out Zero's will due to his age and skepticism that human subordinates would be able to do so. However, over time, the system evolved from its original purpose to create a new world order based on war economies. The Patriots' network is shut down when Naomi Hunter's and Sunny's FOXALIVE computer worm uses GW as a conduit to access the others.

The Patriots' AI (as the Colonel in Metal Gear Solid 2) is voiced by Takeshi Aono in Japanese and by Paul Eiding in English.

=== Philanthropy ===
Philanthropy (フィランソロピー, Firansoropī) is a U.N.-recognized anti-Metal Gear non-governmental organization in Metal Gear Solid 2. Its primary members consist of Solid Snake, Hal Emmerich, and Mei Ling. A large amount of the startup funds for the organization were provided by Nastasha Romanenko. Being an NGO, while the U.N. recognizes its existence, it has no official government backing. As Philanthropy is a semi-clandestine organization, Otacon must sometimes obtain equipment and information through less-than-legal methods; Snake mentions that on more than one occasion, Otacon has hacked classified networks to 'appropriate' experimental technology and intelligence. In addition, it was also involved in activities comparable to terrorism, while a bounty has been placed on them as a result. The group disbanded following the Big Shell incident as Emmerich and Snake switched to fighting the Patriots.

=== The Philosophers ===
The Philosophers (賢者達, Kenjatachi) were an inner circle consisting of the Wisemen's Committee's members, which was formed at the end of World War I when the leaders of the United States, China, and Bolshevik Russia entered a secret pact to pool money and rebuild countries affected by the war. The group's amassed amount totaled 100 billion dollars to fund war efforts and research; this sum became known as the "Philosopher's Legacy". After the original members' deaths during the 1930s, their followers began infighting to inherit the fund left by the original members. In Metal Gear Solid 3, Volgin uses the Philosopher's Legacy to create the fortress Groznyj Grad (グロズニュ・グラード, Gurozunyu Gurādo; Грозный Град) within the Soviet branch, with the Shagohod and The Boss as collateral. Naked Snake retrieves the Philosophers' Legacy after the defeats of Volgin and The Boss for the American branch, but EVA reveals that she is working for the Chinese Philosophers. It is revealed by Ocelot during the post-credits scene that the microfilm EVA took was a fake. Big Boss had the real one for himself, which he later gives to the CIA. The game's ending timeline establishes that a reorganized American branch of the Philosophers, which later becomes Cipher, is formed after accumulating the missing funds; Metal Gear Solid: Portable Ops instead shows Ocelot killing the DCI to end the Philosophers and obtain documents containing the Philosophers' identities and the location of the organization's funds.

=== FOX ===
The FOX unit (FOX部隊, Fokkusu Butai; which stands for "Force Operation X") is introduced in Metal Gear Solid 3 as Zero's special forces unit, with Naked Snake as its first agent and Para-Medic and Sigint as additional support. The FOX unit turns renegade in Portable Ops under Gene's ultimate goal of Army's Heaven (アーミーズヘブン, Āmīzu Hebun) that victimizes soldiers in pursuit of Gene's goals. In response, Naked Snake and Roy Campbell form their own team of specialists which goes on to become the FOXHOUND unit. Big Boss wears the FOX unit's shoulder sleeve insignia on the right side of his uniform in Peace Walker and Ground Zeroes.

A covert strike force, XOF, appears in Metal Gear Solid V under Skull Face's leadership. Originally a support network for FOX, XOF secretly continued as a black ops division of Cipher before having gone rogue, as shown when they remove any identifying markings from both personnel and equipment in Ground Zeroes. After carrying out a successful assault on MSF's Mother Base, XOF are eventually destroyed by the Diamond Dogs led by Venom Snake in The Phantom Pain.

FOX's insignia is a stylized yellow fox on a black background, while XOF's insignia is a black fox on a yellow background.

=== MSF ===
Militaires Sans Frontieres (国境なき軍隊, Kokkyō Naki Guntai; translated as "Soldiers Without Borders") is Naked Snake's mercenary group in Metal Gear Solid: Peace Walker. Their name is a play on that of the real-world humanitarian-aid NGO Médecins Sans Frontières, dedicated to assisting countries ravaged by war and epidemics that are in need of doctors and medical experts. The HD Edition version of Peace Walker displays an announcement before the title screen, stating that the fictional mercenary group is not in any way linked to the real group. Despite this, the group is never mentioned by name in Metal Gear Solid V and the unit's emblem was modified to omit its name. MSF's logo is a skull stylized after Pangaea inside a yellow and black circle.

Per The Boss's will, Snake conceptualized MSF as capable of providing combat support to any individual or country, regardless of other factors. Kazuhira Miller helps develop MSF into a private military contractor offering a wide range of services on their Mother Base (マザーベース, Mazā Bēsu) in the Caribbean Sea, thanks to Vladimir Zadornov and Paz Ortega Andrade during Coldman's Peace Sentinel takeover within Costa Rica and later the MSF's own housing of Metal Gear ZEKE. Metal Gear Solid V: Ground Zeroes shows that the MSF unit is all but gone after the mysterious XOF organization attacks; many of the MSF personnel on assignment at the time of the attack return right away, are disheartened by Big Boss's apparent death, and later move on to work in other mercenary outfits. The group is renamed "Out Of Order" in the Japanese language novelizations of Peace Walker and The Phantom Pain authored by Hitori Nojima, and appears in the subtitles for the Japanese version of The Phantom Pain but is never spoken by the actual characters.

=== Cipher ===
Cipher (サイファー, Saifā) is an American covert intelligence agency that served as the Philosophers' reorganized American branch and the Patriots' precursor. The group is officially mentioned in Metal Gear Solid: Peace Walker and referenced throughout most of Metal Gear Solid V: Ground Zeroes and Metal Gear Solid V: The Phantom Pain. The organization was initially formed by Zero alongside Big Boss to fulfill The Boss's ideal unified world. A fallout occurred wherein Big Boss and Zero interpreted The Boss's will differently; Big Boss wanted a world where soldiers were not used as government tools with Revolver Ocelot and EVA as support, whereas Zero took to control of the entire world to ensure unification which would eventually grow too corrupt. As seen with Donald Anderson and Dr. Clark, and having Pacifica Ocean oppose MSF via Metal Gear ZEKE, Cipher ends up disorganized by Skull Face's ambitions.

=== Diamond Dogs ===
The Diamond Dogs (ダイアモンド・ドッグズ, Daiamondo Dogguzu) are a splinter organization made from MSF's surviving remnants under Venom Snake's command in Metal Gear Solid V: The Phantom Pain. The Diamond Dogs is based out of a new Mother Base in the Seychelles, given out of gratitude for their assistance in fighting off a coup, with Kazuhira Miller and Revolver Ocelot as seconds in command. The Diamond Dogs' logo consists of a profile shot of a Rhodesian Ridgeback dog overlaid upon a cut diamond, finished off with a yellow scroll featuring the words "Diamond Dogs".

== Reception ==
The characters from the Metal Gear series have been well-received by gamers, with Solid Snake and Raiden appearing in a Famitsu poll that listed the fifty best video game characters; while the former was at the top, the latter was 42nd. Solid Snake has also appeared in multiple lists of best characters in gaming history, while Raiden and Revolver Ocelot were found as characters who should have their own spin-off games. While the variety of characters has been noted, publications often found some out of place as a result of their abilities and confusing changes occurring within them. The characters have also been praised for their actions within fight scenes, resulting in appealing cutscenes.

The bosses have been praised not only for the requirements for defeating them, but also for the importance they have within the story. Various video game publications have made feature articles regarding who is the best boss character within the series, though results have varied. During 2004, The Boss was awarded "Best New Character" by GameSpot for her role in Metal Gear Solid 3: Snake Eater. In 2013, GamesRadar praised the character roles of Revolver Ocelot/Liquid Ocelot, Psycho Mantis, The Boss, and Steven Armstrong, placing them in their list of 100 best villains in video games.
