= Kyoko Terase =

Japanese voice actress

Kyoko Terase (寺瀬 今日子, Terase Kyōko; born July 5, 1958) is a Japanese voice actress currently employed by Aoni Production. She currently resides in Tokyo. In the past, she has been credited under the stage name Megumi Terase (寺瀬 めぐみ, Terase Megumi).

== Roles ==
=== Anime television series ===
- Attack on Titan - Moses's Mother (Ep. 1)
- Pokémon: Advanced Generation - Yoshie
- Yawara! A Fashionable Judo Girl - Sayaka's mother

=== OVA ===
- Crying Freeman - Tanya
- Fullmetal Alchemist: Brotherhood - Madam Hamburgang
- Initial D: Extra Stage 2 - Koichiro Iketani's mother
- Kishin Corps: Alien Defender Geo-Armor - Helen
- Tomoe ga Yuku - Kaori Mishima

=== Video games ===
- Abalaburn - Evil Baal
- Super Schwarzschild - Narrator
- Super Schwarzschild II - Narrator
- Dragon Slayer: The Legend of Heroes - Silphie
- Policenauts - Meryl Silverburgh
- Metal Gear Solid - Meryl Silverburgh
- Metal Gear Solid 2: Sons of Liberty - Olga Gurlukovich
- Metal Gear Solid 4: Guns of the Patriots - Meryl Silverburgh

=== Dub roles ===
- Babylon 5 - Susan Ivanova
- Easy A - Rosemary Penderghast

=== Tokusatsu ===
- Mahou Sentai Magiranger - Sphinx (Voice)
