= Metal Gear Online =

- Packaging for the Japanese stand-alone version
- Developer: Kojima Productions
- Publisher: Konami
- Series: Metal Gear
- Platforms: PlayStation 3; Arcade
- Release: PlayStation 3: WW: June 12, 2008; JP: July 17, 2008 (Note: Standalone version); Arcade: JP: December 20, 2010
- Genres: Stealth, third-person shooter
- Mode: Multiplayer

Metal Gear Online, also known as Metal Gear Online 2, was a stealth third-person shooter video game for the PlayStation 3. Released in 2008, it was an online multiplayer spin-off of the Metal Gear video game series. The starter pack of Online was available worldwide bundled with Metal Gear Solid 4: Guns of the Patriots, with a standalone release for Japan. The name Metal Gear Online is common with earlier online components for Metal Gear Solid 3: Subsistence and Metal Gear Solid: Portable Ops. Metal Gear Online's North American and European servers were shut down on June 12, 2012.

== Gameplay ==
Metal Gear Online allowed up to 16 players to engage in online tactical warfare. Players create a character by choosing their name, gender (with the GENE Expansion), race and voice. Creating a new character requires the old to be deleted or an additional character slot to be purchased. Characters receive different performance indicators between official tournaments (grade) and regular matches (level). Both ranking systems encourage playing against higher ranked players and disfavor playing against players of equal or lower rank. Grades range from Rookie to SS+, and are influenced by performance in Survival and Tournament rounds. Levels range from 0 to 22 and fluctuate based on results in Statistics enabled battles.

Statistics are recorded for each character, as well as a title, awards and match history. Based on these weekly and long term statistics, characters receive Animal Titles that denote their in-game behavior. For instance, frequently injecting enemies with the Scanning Plug will lead to the Bee rank, while using ENVG (Enhanced Night Vision Goggles) for a specific share of weekly play time grants the Night Owl rank. An inner rank hierarchy determines which of the acquired ranks will be active.

Skills can be equipped, both manually and by registering a skill set, to enhance character abilities. They range from the straightforward, like Assault Rifle+ that decreases reload time and recoil, to more complex, like Mοnomania which effectively turns bullets into short-term tracking devices. Equipped skills level up when the character is involved in an action pertinent to the skill. Depending on their level, skills occupy from 1 to the maximum of 4 available skill slots. Clans, mutually exclusive groups of up to 64 characters, were also supported, uniting members under the clan name, emblem and reputation. The clan's leader chooses its emblem, decides over the inclusion of clan applicants, and needs to be at least level 3, with over 20 hours online play. As of May 27, 2009, 12 players per region are randomly assigned the Patriot rank for a week. Patriots can select the namesake hand rifle, with infinite ammo and no reloading, in all game rules except Stealth Deathmatch and Team Sneaking.

=== Rules of play ===
MGO provides several gameplay rules, fitting to both team based and solitary fighting styles. Every time you enter you must agree to the terms of the game.

Deathmatch pits players against each other, competing for the highest score until the ever-decreasing kill counter or time reach zero. The player with the highest score is visible to others through SOP, and more when you kill.

Stealth Deathmatch also pits players against each other, geared with stealth camo. A three level alarm informs players of enemy proximity. Eventually, the game area begins to constrict, leaving all outside it to suffer damage. There is no respawning, so the battle continues until one player is left alive, or until time runs out. Players receive extra points for surviving another's death.

Team Deathmatch groups players into two teams, with each death decreasing the team's remaining tickets. The team to first deplete the other's tickets, or with more tickets when time runs out is the winner.

Capture Mission has teams racing to capture and hold within their goal area assigned targets, KEROTAN and GA-KO, for a cumulative period of 30 seconds. With both items in one team's goal area, the timer runs twice as fast, whereas if they are divided among goal areas, the timer is reset for both teams. An extra time option can be enabled, which disables winning by time.

Solo Capture Mission leaves each character to fend for themselves, while also trying to keep KEROTAN in their possession for a cumulative period of 60 seconds. The character who has hold of KEROTAN is visible to others through SOP.

Rescue Mission premises the attacking team acquire GA-KO and place it in their goal area or at least hold onto it when time reaches zero, while the other team defends. As there is no respawning in this mode, a team also wins by killing all the enemy team's members.

Base Mission is structured around capturing and defending small areas scattered across the map. A team wins by seizing all bases, or by having captured more bases than the enemy team when time runs out. Bases are captured by remaining within them for a period of time, and become spawn points for the capturing team. Contested bases can not be used as spawn points.

Bomb mission asks of the attacking team to plant a time bomb on a designated area and ensure it detonates within a time limit. A limited cache of time bombs are scattered across the map, and only one can be held at a time. The defending team wins by averting detonation, or by nullifying all bombs. A planted bomb is removed when sprayed with coolant, while a dropped bomb is destroyed if it doesn't get picked up again in a set amount of time.

Race Mission has each of two teams competing to deliver its target to a series of checkpoints. The Red Team's target is GA-KO, while the Blue Team's is KEROTAN. The target's position is reset, and the team's checkpoint changes if a target is dropped and not picked up within the allowed time limit.

Team Sneaking demands from the attacking team, equipped with stealth camo, to bring either KEROTAN or GA-KO to their goal area, while the other team defends the items. Another win condition is to kill, stun, and (only for the attacking team) hold up all enemy team members. Whenever a stealth soldier is discovered, all stealth camo is temporarily rendered non operational. Drebin Points do not apply to this type of mission.

Sneaking Mission features two opposing teams, Snake, and with at least 12 participants, Metal Gear Mk II. Snake wins by collecting, through body searches, three dogtags, with each life lost resetting the count to zero. Teams claim victory by killing Snake a set number of times, or by having scored more opposing team kills when time runs out. Drebin Points do not apply to this type of mission.

Interval allows players to engage in battle with no repercussion to their statistics or skill leveling. A time bomb can be collected and passed around players to liven up the pace. Weapons and attachments do not cost Drebin Points.

Non standard settings, that influence the battle's dynamic, are optional within some gameplay rules. Under the eponymous setting, players gain "Drebin Points" for actions such as kills and headshots, and can redeem them for advanced weapons, attachments and ammunition at their base or at respawn. Biding by "Headshots only", kills that aren't achieved through headshots cost the player their life and a time penalty before respawn, while in "Headshots Disabled" lobbies, a headshot's damage is reduced to that of other body parts.

=== SOP system ===
The SOP system, as within MGS4, is a fictional, nanomachine based network which ensures linked members share vital information. This data consists of speech, character's location, even behind walls, traps and aiming lines, changes in battle capacity (stun, sleep, death, distracted) and Snake's location when he's discovered. Characters gather information through combat, Scanning Plug injections, which hack into an enemy's SOP data pool, and SOP augmenting skills and weapons. A temporary SOP cease fire is optionally enforced upon injuring a teammate.

=== Stealth ===
A character's presence and movement in the battlefield are accompanied by visual and aural signs. The body and equipment's visual presence, shadows, gunfire, footsteps, frozen breath and upset dust or snow from movement are the sum of these indicators. Suppressing these signs while attacking and diagnosing them while defending are equally contributing factors to success. As such, any surface that obscures the field of vision, be it a wall, car or even cardboard box, can serve as a hiding spot and set up to an ambush. Playing dead suppresses breathing and can trick careless foes, with the downside of vulnerability. As a countermeasure, wary combatants approach corners carefully, inspect unconvincing cardboard boxes and check suspicious bodies.

Stealth camouflage, available in Team Sneaking missions and Stealth Deathmatch, renders only the user's body transparent, leaving equipped gear visible. Snake's Octocamo and Facecamo, on the other hand, render him and his equipment invisible even to ENVG users, when fully capitalized. Neither technology prevents shadows, while both produce a distinct sound upon activation and deactivation. The knife is always visible even when not equipped.

=== Close Quarters Combat ===
CQC in-game action

Close Quarters Combat is a military technique that consists of throws and holds, used to incapacitate an enemy while bare-handed, or to gain a tactical, rather than lethal, advantage when armed. All characters can wield basic forms of CQC, such as the three-hit combo, the take-down throw, or the CQC push, with a two-handed gun. Weapons that support CQC are marked as such in their item box. As CQC is a close proximity, one versus one technique, lone soldiers tend to avoid it when outnumbered.

CQC enhancing skills increase stamina damage (from bare hand fighting and takedowns) and the speed of CQC actions. They also enable the choke-hold, which opens tactical options. With the target immobilized, the assailant can deplete the target's stamina, resulting in a knock out, force the enemy to the ground, or even release the enemy when fleeing is advised. Further actions become available by equipping weapons or skills, like planting C4 or a Sleeping Gas Satchel on the victim, throwing a grenade, using the foe as a human shield and firing at an impending threat (when armed with a handgun), slitting the enemy's throat (with Blades+3 CQC lvl 1 in use) or injecting a Scanning plug (only with it equipped). At CQC+ Lvl 3 a character can disarm the opponent through the choke-hold or the CQC push, while with the CQC EX skill players automatically counter CQC grabs (unless grabbed during a hold-up, from behind or from a player also with CQC EX).

=== Non-lethal weapons ===
Typical effects of non-lethal weaponry include stamina depletion, target immobilization and information manipulation. Support items are the most diverse in realizing these goals. Stun grenades, for instance, deplete the stamina of nearby opponents, but also cause temporary blindness and deafness to targets up to medium distance. Other examples include proximity and trigger activated sleepgas mines, e-locators that disclose the position of close by targets, chaff grenades to both limit visibility and temporarily obscure the SOP radar, and magazines that occupy a target, rendering them immobile. Non lethal fire-arms consist of the Mosin-Nagant sniper rifle, the Ruger Mk. 2 tranquilizer pistol, the VSS sniper rifle equipped with anesthetic rounds, and any shotgun equipped with Vortex Ring ammo. Headshots from the Mosin-Nagant, VSS, and Ruger Mk. 2 tranquilize instantly, irrespective of target distance. Stunned characters can be body searched for their primary weapon and support items, killed by the enemy to grant even more Drebin Points, or woken up to return to battle. Stunning offers many advantages to simply killing the enemy. A stunned enemy will typically take significantly longer to awake then he would to respawn after being killed, and he does not gain the advantage of having his health and ammo supply regenerated as would happen upon respawning. In addition, his teammates will often divert manpower to attempt to rescue the knocked out player, giving the other team an advantage.

The most formidable non lethal weapon is the SOP destabilizer, only available in Base missions. By temporarily suppressing the nanomachines regulating enemies' behavior, the SOP destabilizer renders all alive enemy team members immobile. The attacking team can then overtake bases without competition while stunning or killing helpless foes. Its main drawbacks are that it leaves the bearer without a primary weapon, and requires a trip from his team's base to the enemy's.

== Reward points and customization ==
Players are free to edit their character's appearance. Gaining an Animal Title grants the character its corresponding T-shirt. Additional clothing, camouflage and color customizations are available in the Reward shop via Reward points, a form of in-game currency. Armor and other clothing bought in the Reward Shop will have no effect on how your character takes damage in the game.

Survival matches grant combatants Reward points based on their win streak of matches, not individual rounds. These matches are open to all players, and players who have installed an expansion are granted entrance to the corresponding Survival lobbies.

Tournament matches, only open to players with the DW expansion, SCENE expansion, MEME expansion and GENE expansion, and allot reward points based on each team's final standing, while also granting the ultimate winners gear not available in the Reward shop.

Both Survival and Tournament matches are held at times predefined by Konami, and follow specific rules.

Logging a character in grants 50 reward points per day (100 on Wednesdays). For the Japanese version logging in is 100 reward points per day and 200 on Wednesday. Completing a round (win or lose), in an Automatching lobby grants the player 20 reward points. During prize matches (Random Automatching events) the winners of the match will receive an extra 200 points (In addition to the 40 reward points gained from playing two rounds) while the losers will receive the regular 40 points.

== Development ==
Metal Gear Online was region locked, meaning that players must be in the same video game publication territory to play together. Region restriction reduces lag, yet can be disadvantageous for the Region 1 and Region 3, designated for American and Asian players, respectively. By importing a copy of Metal Gear Solid 4: Guns of the Patriots from a different region, players could create an account for Metal Gear Online in that region and play in the Free Battle mode without restrictions. Initially, the Survival and Tournament competitive modes also had no restrictions for players who had imported the Japanese version, but Konami eventually instituted IP-based region locking specifically for these modes. This led to players outside of Japan to utilize services such as Overplay VPN at the router level in order to continue to play in these competitive modes, circumventing the regional lock.

Konami required the bearer of the PSN account linked to Metal Gear Online be at least 18 years old. Sony Customer Services could be contacted to lift this restriction in regions where MGS4 has lower age requirements.

An online beta test was available in Japan, Europe and North America. 3,000 players were allowed into the Japanese beta test from August 20 to September 3, 2007. The beta test for North America (serial key only) and Europe (no restrictions) lasted from April 25 to May 11, 2008.

On March 14, 2011, Konami shut down Metal Gear Online's Japanese servers indefinitely in order to conserve power after the Japanese 2011 earthquake.

=== Expansion packs ===
Beyond the initial content available with the Startup pack, new features, such as characters and maps, are added through expansion packs. These could be purchased via PSN. Some of the maps are remakes of areas of other Metal Gear games. MGS3 featured Groznyj Grad while MGS3: Subsistence's MGO featured City Under Siege and Brown Town, reinterpreted as Urban Ultimatum and Coppertown Conflict, respectively. MGS: Portable Ops included Silo entrance, which became Silo Sunset, and locations in MGS4 spurred Midtown Maelstrom, Virtuous Vista and Icebound Inferno. Forest Firefight and Ravaged Riverfront are also loosely based on the forest area in MGS3 and the Eastern Europe area in MGS4.

==== Startup pack ====
The Startup Pack includes 5 maps, namely Ambush Alley, Blood Bath, Groznyj Grad, Midtown Maelstrom, and Urban Ultimatum. It also allows players to assume the role of characters from MGS4's plotline, bearing fixed skill-sets beyond the numerical limitations of ordinary soldiers'. The Startup pack offers two playable special characters, available in Sneaking missions:

Solid Snake, the Legendary Hero, is equipped with CQC EX (Which Knocks out the enemy Instantly) and a diverse armament of lethal and non-lethal weapons. Apart from his FaceCamo and OctoCamo, the Threat Ring indicates the location of nearby characters. Also when you start as Snake he is equipped with the drum can which normally needs to be found on the map. The Solid Eye provides a visualization of the same data through the Baseline Map, identifies items and can switch to Night Vision or Binocular mode. He shouts out Liquids' name when he engages in combat with him. He is the only character in MGO with pro skills. When you have not bought any of the expansion packs, you can only use Snake in sneaking missions.

Metal Gear Mk. II, the Invisible Buddy, can back up Snake on the field. The Mark II is equipped with stealth camo and can display a magazine on its viewscreen to captivate the interest of nearby characters. It communicates with Snake using the character voice of Otacon from MGS4. It can also use its manipulator to electroshock enemies, collect and deliver dogtags to Snake, disarm mechanical traps, and knock on walls. If the Mark II's life gauge is depleted by enemy fire, it will self-repair over time.

==== GENE expansion ====
The GENE expansion pack was released on July 17, 2008. The Plus version, with an additional character slot was discontinued in Japan on November 18, 2008. Players who install the expansion can create female characters and enter the GENE specific Survival lobby. They can also compete in three new maps, Virtuous Vista, Coppertown Conflict, and Tomb of Tubes and enter battle as two special characters:

- Johnny (Akiba), a Trap Otaku, can see all traps on the field, and disarm mechanical traps into items. Three consecutive kills stir up his chronic incontinence, resulting in a comical cloud of foul smell that can preoccupy foes and allies. When injuring a teammate, he leaves himself vulnerable while making excuses. Johnny can't use any form of CQC but the 3 hit combo, and he has no SOP enabling nanomachines, which restricts him from the advantages of information garnered through his teams SOP network but has the positive effect of making him immune to the negative effects of SOP such as Ocelots Guns of the Patriots weapon or SOP Destabs. His unique weapons include the XM8 Compact and the M82A2 Sniper Rifle, which kills with 1 shot from any range.
- Meryl, the Fiery Leader, allows nearby allies to recuperate stamina faster when saluting near them. She has CQC+ Level 2, accompanied by a slew of level 3 skills, including Monomania, Narc, Scanner, Quick Recovery, and Handgun+. Her special weapon is a scope-equipped Desert Eagle Long Barrel. With the Desert Eagle handgun, the ammo from the scope and non-scope desert eagle is pooled together. Meryl can fire both guns without reloading. Both Meryl and Johnny cry out when their other half is killed in combat.

==== MEME expansion ====
The MEME expansion pack was released on November 25, 2008. The GENE expansion is a prerequisite to installing MEME, and a combo pack is also available. Players who install the expansion can compete in MEME Survival lobbies and purchase MEME specific camouflage gear. They can also experience three more maps, namely Silo Sunset, Forest Firefight, and Winter Warehouse and engage in combat as two special characters:

- Mei Ling, the Remote Captain, can command the USS Missouri to cannon strike any location within visible range. Her true skills are as a recon soldier, since her Soliton Sonar radar reveals the position of close by enemies (through SOP). Mei Ling can't use CQC, other than the 3 hit combo, but is equipped with the Scanner EX skill. Her salute entrances all soldiers in a small area.
- Liquid Ocelot, Guns of the Patriots, can use the namesake weapon to temporarily effect upon enemies an SOP safety lock, or a seizure, by disabling the nanomachines controlling their behavior. Much like Snake, he is equipped with CQC EX, while his three-hit combo can end in either a strong punch or a headbutt. He can shock his opponent with the Stun Knife during a choke hold, instantly knocking out the opponent. The Thor .45-70 handgun, his unique weapon, requires reload after every bullet fired but deals lethal damage within medium range. He shouts out his nemesis' name when he spots Snake and exclaims the phrase 'You're pretty good!' when shot in the head. If Liquid is killed and does not respawn when the time runs out in any mode that allows respawns, he resets the match's timer, which can change the outcome of the game, but can be done only once in a game.

==== SCENE expansion ====
The SCENE expansion pack was released on March 17, 2009. The MEME expansion is a prerequisite to installing SCENE, and bundle packs with older expansions are available. After purchasing the expansion, players can compete in Tournaments, wear SCENE specific camo gear, fight in Outer Outlet, Hazard House, Ravaged Riverfront and Icebound Inferno. Old Snake can now be used in any game type that has Special Characters enabled, or the player can select from two new special characters:

- Raiden, the White-blooded Scout, can fall from any height without damage and jump on ledges that would normally require a boost, and has no nanomachines. He handles a High Frequency Blade, operable in lethal and non-lethal mode, which allows him to deflect frontal attacks. His other unique weapons are the Mk.23 pistol and the Throwing Knife. When his Visor is closed, he can see all traps in the map. Instead of the usual CQC three-hit combo, he will instead start a spin kick which will continue as long as the user keeps tapping R1. When pressing the jump back button, Raiden, will do backwards handstands instead of jumping backwards (Raiden can get shot during these back handstands). He is also equipped with CQC 2 and a throat-slitting ability, along with a running ability higher than runner 3. (Equal to Runner 3 as of version 1.36)
- Vamp, the Undead Blade, can fall from any height without damage and jump on ledges that would normally require a boost. He is an expert at using the Combat Knife and Throwing Knives. On his normal R1 CQC Combo, his third attack is replaced with an axe kick. Pressing the side roll button will make Vamp move swiftly to the right/left (depending on which way you are making him move) which avoids all bullets. Pressing the jump back button, will make Vamp swiftly move backwards, however, this move does not avoid bullets. Upon dying, he is resurrected on the spot after a few seconds. His Throwing Knives home in on an enemies chest if locked on with Auto Aim. He is also equipped with CQC 2 and a throat-slitting ability, along with a running ability higher than runner 3. (Equal to Runner 3 as of version 1.36)

=== Cheating and distributed denial of service attacks ===
Metal Gear Online has been plagued by several methods of cheating, including lag-switching and exploiting glitches. It has also been the target of frequent DDoS attacks, starting from 2011 and lasting until service termination. When the attacks first started, the targets were primarily the players of the opposing team in a competitive match. Attackers disconnected these players either to win the match by default or to gain an advantage. Konami silently addressed this by masking IPs of players in official modes. However, attackers instead targeted the servers themselves. These attacks typically resulted in higher-than-average lag while navigating the in-game menus, and/or the disconnection of players who were online. Because of the nature of these attacks, it is difficult to effectively report the perpetrators. On August 31, Konami issued a statement assuring players that any persons violating the codes of conduct will be banned from service. Although banning perpetrators kept them off the game, the server attacks could still be carried out. Up until its shutdown, these attacks had not ceased.

=== Termination of service ===
On February 14, 2012, Konami announced via their website and in-game client that all Metal Gear Online services will be, and has been terminated on June 12, 2012. The announcement detailed cancellations of various services up to June 12 including the closure of the online store and that all expansion packs will be free of charge from April 24, 2012, onward. The game servers originally had a contract for three years, however the service was extended an additional year before termination, for a total of four years of service. As of the 2.00 patch issued on June 8, 2012, the Metal Gear Online game data and menu option was permanently removed from the game.

== Competitions ==
Konami organized regional and worldwide competitions periodically. Notable examples include the MGO World Championship 2008. and the MGO Anniversary Tournament.

=== 2010 European championship ===
Entrants were selected on a first come, first served basis. In the first round of the tournament finals, eight preliminary groups of eight teams competed in a knock-out style tournament in which only one team could proceed to the next round. These eight winning teams advanced to a final knock-out stage, held on the March 7, 2010, where a best-of-three format was adopted. To The Max defeated PBO in the grand finals, and Peace Of Mind defeated PotentiaL in the third place play-off. The 1st, 2nd and 3rd placed teams received an MGS4 Edition Astro Audio System, Astro Gamer-Backpack "Scout", and Astro Gamer-Tasche "Mission", respectively.

There was controversy when one of the event players by the name of "REDWINGS" took part in the tournament but cheated in order to win the prize. Many EU players have said he is the reason there hasn't been any tournaments since EC 2010 as he wasn't the only person to play unfairly.

== Metal Gear Arcade ==
Metal Gear Arcade logo

Metal Gear Arcade is a reworked arcade version of Metal Gear Online developed by Kojima Productions and released on December 20, 2010, in Japan. It features head controls and stereoscopic 3D rendering.

== Legacy ==
On June 13, 2013, Hideo Kojima confirmed that a new Metal Gear Online would be included with Metal Gear Solid V: The Phantom Pain.
