= Senator Armstrong (Metal Gear) =

Fictional character in the Metal Gear series

- Metal Gear character
- Senator Armstrong after powering up as seen in Metal Gear Rising: Revengeance
- First appearance: Metal Gear Rising: Revengeance (2013)
- Created by: Kenji Saito
- Designed by: Yonghee Cho
- Voiced by: EN: Alastair Duncan; JA: Unsho Ishizuka

In-universe information
- Origin: Colorado, United States of America
- Nationality: American

Senator Steven Armstrong (Japanese: スティーヴン・アームストロング, Hepburn: Sutīvun Āmusutorongu) is the main antagonist and final boss of the 2013 action video game Metal Gear Rising: Revengeance, a PlatinumGames-developed spin-off of the Metal Gear franchise. He utilizes terrorist groups to trigger a war in order to jump-start the American economy, seemingly as part of a plot to be elected President of the United States; however, he later reveals that his true goals are to purge America of corruption and end the concept of war as a business, as well as enact a form of social Darwinism. While initially presented as a normal human, a plot twist prior to his battle with game protagonist Raiden reveals Armstrong to be nanomachine-augmented and capable of superhuman strength and durability. In Japanese, he is voiced by Unsho Ishizuka, while in English he is voiced by Alastair Duncan.

Since his debut, Armstrong has been met with a positive critical response, with many highlighting his role in the game and praise being given to his boss battle, particularly through reactions to his rhetoric in the form of Internet memes. Both the character and the music that accompanies him during his boss fights have been analyzed for their ideals and political analogies. His stated goals and views of American culture have been compared to those of Donald Trump by numerous commentators.

== Conception and design ==
Armstrong's nanomachines in action. The strain causes his blood vessels to swell in his powered-up state, particularly around his heart.

Armstrong was created by game director Kenji Saito when developing Metal Gear Rising: Revengeance. Saito wanted a character who could illustrate how human enhancement could exceed the strength of cyborgs in the Metal Gear universe. While the idea of nanotechnology to enhance the human body was explored previously with the character Vamp in Metal Gear Solid 2, the nanomachines in Armstrong's body were of a much higher concentration. They give him enhanced strength but also act as self-repair units. In addition they allow him to temporarily harden his skin and muscles beyond their normal limits at will, and in response to physical trauma.

Designed by Yonghee Cho, Armstrong is a tall man with a long forehead, pronounced chin, glasses, and a pinstripe suit with a yellow tie and white shirt underneath. When utilizing his nanomachines, Armstrong's body gains significant muscle mass, and causes his heart and blood vessels to stand out. In early concept art, the blood vessels in areas affected by pressure would concentrate and thicken further on the affected location, causing the area to turn blood red. However in the final game, the affected areas instead turn black, while his eyes glow red. Originally Cho had designed him to look "smarter and sharper", however some of the development team felt this made him not look "impressive enough", so he emphasized Armstrong's forehead and chin. While Cho stated he still prefers the initial design, he felt the finalized one better reflected the character's voice and philosophy.

Armstrong is voiced by Unsho Ishizuka in Japanese, while Alastair Duncan provided his voice in English. When cast, Duncan was not informed what character he would be voicing or that Armstrong would be the main villain, simply stating "All I knew was that my character was an amoral 'power-hungry American senator'". In an interview with VG247, Duncan stated he enjoyed doing the role, enjoying the more plausible aspects of Armstrong's character and adding that it felt powerful "to actually be able to play something where you're playing as a total megalomaniac".

== Appearances ==
Steven Armstrong is a Colorado senator introduced as the main antagonist of the 2013 action-adventure game Metal Gear Rising: Revengeance, developed by Platinum Games and produced by Konami. In the game's story, he acts as the primary backer of two private military corporations, Desperado and World Marshal, which act under his orders to commit terrorist acts and drive conflict. At the game's climax, he appears piloting a large hexapedal mech named "Metal Gear EXCELSUS" and reveals his plan to cause a war to jumpstart the American economy to end a recession, and using it as a platform to become President of the United States. He attacks protagonist Raiden, and the mech is disabled in the ensuing battle.

Emerging from EXCELSUS' core, Armstrong reveals himself to be infused with nanomachines, and after absorbing energy from the mech's remains becomes significantly larger and attacks Raiden in hand-to-hand combat. During the battle he reveals the truth of his goals in an attempt to convince Raiden to side with him: he is disgusted with the corruption in America, and seeks to use war as a business to end war as a business. However his policy also relies on a form of social Darwinism, where "the weak will be purged, and the strongest will thrive". Raiden refuses to join him, and after a prolonged battle is able to tear out Armstrong's heart. In his dying moments, Armstrong states that the corruption will continue, but names Raiden his successor. Raiden later quotes Armstrong during the game's concluding scene, before engaging in another battle.

In the "Jetstream" downloadable content for Revengeance, which takes place prior to the events of the game, Armstrong appears as the final boss to forcibly recruit the character Jetstream Sam to his cause. Armstrong also appears on cards for Metal Gear Solid: Social Ops, an online mobile card game released by Konami.

== Promotion and reception ==
A portion of Armstrong's speech from Revengeance. The speech in its entirety has been examined by media outlets in terms of dialogue and delivery not only within the scope of internet memes, but also in the context of modern politics, criticisms of America, and the differing philosophies between Armstrong and Raiden

To promote the game and character, in May 2012 Konami posted a "leaked" audio log, stated to be from a whistleblower website called "WarOnOurShores.com", that featured Armstrong discussing his plans with his speech writer. For the game's 10th anniversary, Platinum Games' staff produced various artworks of the characters in celebration, with Kenji Saito acknowledging Armstrong's heavy use in western internet memes. In 2025, Cup Noodles in Japan used edited footage of Armstrong fighting Raiden to encourage people to eat their product with a fork instead of chopsticks.

Armstrong was positively received since his debut. Scott McCrae of VG247 stated that Armstrong "cemented himself as one of the most iconic characters in Metal Gear history", describing the character as a surprise in contrast to other series villains and politicians. He noted that while the series was known for characters that monologued, few did it "while manhandling the protagonist", and combined with his intensity and Duncan's performance made him an effective politician in McCrae's eyes, even if Armstrong's statements were unrealistic and insane.

Other outlets acknowledged that while he only appeared at the end of Revengeance, he had significant impact. Shubhankar Parijat of GamingBolt stated in 2023 that "he may very well be" one the best villains in video games in the last decade, stating that while he didn't have a massive role in the game, "boy did he have a massive presence". They added that while the boss fight itself was punishing, Armstrong had one of the best personalities of anyone in the whole game, "and has single handedly given birth to some of the best gaming memes you’ll ever see". Gabriel Zamora of PCMag stated that while the character was portrayed as "a giant, campy, football-loving American", his viewpoints towards topics such as American consumption of the media and the government were "uncannily prophetic", and felt that his importance in the game's narrative could not be overstated.

Several video game publications, as well as Armstrong's voice actor Alastair Duncan himself, have compared Armstrong to United States President Donald Trump, following Trump's first election in 2016, three years after the release of Metal Gear Rising: Revengeance. Similarly to Trump, Armstrong uses reactionary and anti-establishment rhetoric to win over the American public, as well as the exact slogan "Make America Great Again", a line uttered by Armstrong that had also been used by Ronald Reagan. In 2016, Harper Jay MacIntyre in an article for Kotaku drew parallels between Armstrong's ideology and that of then-presidential candidate Trump as a form of protest against Trump's policies and to urge people to vote in the impending election.

=== Character analysis ===
Comic Book Resources' Sam Rowett, in examining the philosophy behind Revengeance, described Armstrong's ideals as those of philosopher Ayn Rand "taken to their logical conclusion". However, he pointed out that while Armstrong expressed disdain for "the weak", Raiden's retort that Armstrong knows nothing of them was accurate: Armstrong relies on his wealth and the strength provided by the nanomachines, in contrast to Raiden who through the story is stripped of his humanity and constantly tries to reconnect with it. In this way Rowett felt Armstrong did not live up to his own ideals, and instead represented a lust for power, "even at the expense of others", while Raiden reflected American optimism. While both men were driven by their disgust for what America had become, he saw in the game's conclusion that Raiden did not necessarily take on Armstrong's ideals, but instead his drive to "achieve his goal by any means necessary."

Despite their earlier article, in their book titled Rules of Nature, MacIntyre would describe Armstrong's rhetoric as the game shifting from attacking the player's character to the player themselves, particularly the Western audience in its condemnation of modern America. Describing him as a "villain of grandeur" and a symbol of "violent Americana", they felt that the character and Raiden's reactions to him provided the series' "most open and honest damnation of political structures." They further noted the shared ideals Armstrong and Raiden share in their disdain for the state of America, however due to the former's desire to use Social Darwinism as a solution, the two were inevitable to come into conflict. Armstrong's death represented in MacIntyre's eyes the vanquishing of a "passionate foe corrupted by imperfect beliefs", reflected in the nature of his exposed nanomachine-infused heart before it is crushed, something that "pounds with life but it is still artificial and unnatural". Though Armstrong dies, MacIntyre felt he and Raiden developed a bond through combat, reflected in Raiden quoting Armstrong at the game's conclusion.

The lyrics in the background music tracks that play during each of Armstrong's boss fights have also been analyzed and praised for how they illustrate the character's themes. MacIntyre emphasized the use of "blindly" in "Collective Consciousness", the track used in the EXCELSUS battle, to illustrate the game's condemnation of American politics: how the populace will "ignore the real cost of their happiness, justify the actions that granted it" and instead engage in rampant consumption. Meanwhile, Rizky Anugrah Putra in the journal Pulchra Lingua: A Journal of Language Study, Literature & Linguistics examined how the final boss track "It Has To Be This Way" illustrated the conflict between Raiden and Armstrong and how both men wanting to make the world better, with Armstrong dreaming of America "becoming a country where every citizen can realize and fight for his dreams". However, despite being able to comprehend each other's viewpoints and knowing violence would only make things worse, Armstrong's ideals are so extreme that the only resolution is violent conflict, and the resulting destruction will bring change.
