= Might makes right (disambiguation) =

Might makes right is an aphorism used to express the idea that moral standards are dictated by those in power.

Might makes right may also refer to:

- "Might Makes Right", a song by Camper Van Beethoven from their album New Roman Times
- "Might Makes Right", a song featured in Metal Gear Rising: Revengance
- Might Is Right, a 1896 book by Ragnar Redbeard
