= Music of Metal Gear Rising: Revengeance =

Music of the 2013 video game Metal Gear Rising: Revengeance

Metal Gear Rising: Revengeance – Vocal Tracks

Soundtrack album to Metal Gear Rising: Revengeance by Jamie Christopherson
- Released: February 19, 2013
- Genre: Heavy metal
- Length: 1:11:16
- Labels: Konami Digital Entertainment, Sumthing Else
- Producer: Jamie Christopherson

The music of Metal Gear Rising: Revengeance (2013), developed by PlatinumGames and published by Konami, was composed primarily by Jamie Christopherson. Composed over a period of six months starting in November 2011, Christopherson worked with several other artists such as Logan Mader to create 13 heavy metal tracks for the game, some of which were assigned to specific characters and are adaptive to the gameplay. The soundtrack received praise for its composition and usage in the game. The game itself experienced a resurgence in popularity in 2022, attributed to a spate of new viral memes based on its music.

== Background and composition ==
The soundtrack of Metal Gear Rising: Revengeance was primarily composed by Jamie Christopherson over a six-month period. Christopherson had previously done work for several Japanese clients and composed music for games such as Lost Planet 2 (2010). Christopherson was first contacted by PlatinumGames when they hired Soundelux DMG for the game's sound effects and voiceover work. As they were hiring Soundelux, Platinum requested that Christopherson compose the game's soundtrack in November 2011, around midway through the game's development. This was Christopherson's first time composing an entire album's worth of music, and he described the amount of work and collaboration needed to create it to GameZone as "something completely different than I've experienced before in producing a soundtrack" and as "the most collaborative effort of any project that I've worked on".

Due to the scale of the project, Christopherson enlisted the help of other artists to sing and write the game's vocal tracks, such as former Machine Head guitarist Logan Mader, electronic DJ Ferry Corsten, Voodoo Highway singer Graeme Cornies, Jason Charles Miller, and remixers Maniac Agenda. Christopherson was also given some guidelines by Hideo Kojima on writing lyrics for the game's bosses, though most of the guidance was given to Christopherson by Platinum. Unlike previous games in the Metal Gear series, which were stealth-based and primarily used more cinematic music, Metal Gear Rising was being developed as a hack and slash, and thus the soundtrack was required to be more energetic. Platinum requested a heavy metal soundtrack for the new game, like that of previous projects such as Bayonetta (2009) and Anarchy Reigns (2012), though due to Christopherson's lack of experience in creating metal music, he required assistance from artists he had hired to collaborate with. The team also integrated different "types" of metal for the boss fights, citing "Rammstein metal" as the basis for the track "Red Sun", and using primarily synthesizers for tracks such as "The Stains of Time". A total of 13 tracks were composed for the game, and by the end of development, around 700 gigabytes worth of files were transferred back-and-forth between Christopherson and Naoto Tanaka, Platinum's music director. During the game's midnight launch in Los Angeles, Konami invited the first 150 people in line to a private concert where Christopherson and his team performed the soundtrack live.

=== Implementation in-game ===
"The Only Thing I Know For Real"
An excerpt from "The Only Thing I Know For Real", used in the game's boss fight against Jetstream Sam and demonstrating the soundtracks heavy metal composition. Critics praised the tracks lyrics for fitting with Sam's theme of struggling with identity loss.

Platinum arranged and mixed Christopherson's work with the Wwise engine to make the soundtrack adaptive to gameplay, in particular, causing elements of it, in Christopherson's words, to "kick in at the height of the boss battles". A notable example occurs in the game's opening sequence, where the vocal of the track "Rules of Nature" is scripted to begin at the moment the player character Raiden parries a Metal Gear Ray. A reversal of the technique occurs in Raiden's boss fight with Jetstream Sam, where the vocal for "The Only Thing I Know For Real", the latter's theme track, diminishes as the fight intensifies to "represent [Sam's] inner thoughts being overtaken by concentration", in the words of NME. Another unusual feature of the soundtrack is that the lyrics for the boss themes express the bosses' motivations, giving a greater sense of psychological depth to characters who might otherwise be perceived as one-dimensional.

== Album ==
The soundtrack was included as a part of the Limited Edition of Metal Gear Rising: Revengeance, which released on February 19, 2013. It also received a separate physical and digital release at the same time.

Metal Gear Rising: Revengeance – Vocal Tracks (disc 1)
No.	Title	Length
1.	"Rules of Nature" (Platinum Mix)	2:30
2.	"The Only Thing I Know For Real" (Maniac Agenda Mix)	2:26
3.	"Dark Skies" (Platinum Mix)	2:21
4.	"I'm My Own Master Now" (Platinum Mix)	2:10
5.	"A Stranger I Remain" (Maniac Agenda Mix)	2:25
6.	"Return to Ashes" (Platinum Mix)	2:15
7.	"The Stains of Time" (Maniac Agenda Mix)	2:10
8.	"Red Sun" (Maniac Agenda Mix)	2:13
9.	"A Soul Can't Be Cut" (Platinum Mix)	2:19
10.	"Collective Consciousness" (Maniac Agenda Mix)	2:38
11.	"It Has To Be This Way" (Platinum Mix)	2:55
12.	"The War Still Rages Within"	5:00
13.	"The Hot Wind Blowing feat. Ferry Corsten" (Platinum Mix)	2:18
14.	"A Soul Can't Be Cut" (Platinum Mix)	2:19
15.	"Dark Skies" (Platinum Mix – Low Key Version)	2:17
16.	"Return to Ashes" (Platinum Mix – Low Key Version)	2:14
17.	"A Soul Can't Be Cut" (Platinum Mix – Low Key Version)	2:10
18.	"Rules of Nature" (Platinum Mix – Instrumental)	2:30
19.	"The Only Thing I Know For Real" (Maniac Agenda Mix – Instrumental)	2:26
20.	"Dark Skies" (Platinum Mix – Instrumental)	2:17
21.	"I'm My Own Master Now" (platinum mix – instrumental)	2:10
22.	"A Stranger I Remain" (Maniac Agenda Mix – Instrumental)	2:25
23.	"Return to Ashes" (Platinum Mix – Instrumental)	2:15
24.	"The Stains of Time" (Maniac Agenda Mix – Instrumental)	2:10
25.	"Red Sun" (Maniac Agenda Mix – Instrumental)	2:13
26.	"A Soul Can't Be Cut" (platinum mix – Instrumental)	2:19
27.	"Collective Consciousness" (Maniac Agenda Mix – Instrumental)	2:38
28.	"It Has To Be This Way" (Platinum Mix – Instrumental)	2:55
29.	"The Hot Wind Blowing Feat. Ferry Corsten" (Platinum Mix – Instrumental)	2:18

== Reception and legacy ==
The soundtrack of Metal Gear Rising: Revengeance received generally positive reception from critics. It has been praised for its ability to adapt to in-game actions by Scott McCrae of VG247, with the track "Rules of Nature" being considered a "perfect introduction" to the game. A staff review for AllMusic described the soundtrack as a "driving and hectic blend of electronica and hard rock" that helps "get players in the right headspace to play as katana-wielding cyborgs".

The connections between the soundtrack and specific characters, philosophies, and in-game events have also been praised. McCrae observed that "each song perfectly encapsulates the character it represents", giving as examples "The Only Thing I Know For Real" and "It Has To Be This Way" for their underscoring of Jetstream Sam's struggle with loss of identity and Senator Armstrong's forced conflict with Raiden respectively. McCrae's views on "The Only Thing I Know For Real" were echoed by former Kotaku writer Heather Alexandra in her book Rules of Nature, noting how the track emphasizes the fact that Sam doesn't "even know the reason they are holding their weapon". Alexandra additionally praised the tracks "Collective Consciousness" and "The Hot Wind Blowing", for their thematic focus on the American military, blind obedience to one's country, and American westward expansion throughout history. She described "Collective Consciousness" as focusing on the American populace as a whole, while "The Hot Wind Blowing" focuses on the relationship between the population and the military, with buffalo imagery being used in the latter track to evoke the hunting and near extinction of buffalo and the historical image of "American carelessness".

The soundtrack has seen extensive use in Internet memes, with early ones revolving around "Rules of Nature". In 2022, a number of new memes based on the game went viral, spawning a 1000% increase in players of the game on Steam in May of that year. The memes included some unusual mashups, such as a pairing of "Collective Consciousness" with Mariah Carey's "All I Want for Christmas Is You". The style of adaptive music featured in Revengeance has been employed in later games, including Devil May Cry 5 (2019) and Hi-Fi Rush (2023). The soundtrack was listed in 2013 by both Clash and Rolling Stone as one of the best in video game history, with the former describing it facetiously as "(tremendously) ludicrous" and the latter as adding an "additional level of propulsive energy to the game's frenetic hack-and-slash action".
