= Mineshi Kimura =

Japanese video game designer

Mineshi Kimura (木村 峰士, Kimura Mineshi) is a Japanese video game designer currently employed by Kojima Productions. He has worked on every console title in Hideo Kojima's Metal Gear series and made his directorial debut with Metal Gear Rising: Revengeance. Kimura was the director of the original prequel version of the game, Metal Gear Solid: Rising, before it was cancelled and turned into a sequel to Metal Gear Solid 4: Guns of the Patriots.

== Works ==
- Metal Gear Solid (1998) - Modeler, Texture Artist
- Metal Gear Solid 2: Sons of Liberty (2001) - Mechanical Art Director
- Metal Gear Solid: The Twin Snakes (2004) - Mechanical Model Supervisor
- Metal Gear Solid 3: Snake Eater (2004) - Lead Background Artist
- Metal Gear Solid 4: Guns of the Patriots (2008) - Lead Background Artist
- Metal Gear Rising: Revengeance (2013) - CG Director
- Metal Gear Solid V: Ground Zeroes (2014) - Lead Environment Artist, Artwork
- Metal Gear Solid V: The Phantom Pain (2015) - Lead Environment Artist
- Metal Gear Survive (2018) - Art Manager
