= Metal Gear Rising: Revengeance =

2013 video game

- Developer: PlatinumGames (Note: Kojima Productions assisted on development. Ported to OS X by Transgaming, and to Nvidia Shield TV by Nvidia Lightspeed Studios.)
- Publisher: Konami Digital Entertainment
- Director: Kenji Saito
- Producer: Atsushi Inaba
- Programmer: Tetsuro Noda
- Writer: Etsu Tamari
- Composer: Jamie Christopherson
- Series: Metal Gear
- Platforms: PlayStation 3; Xbox 360; Windows; OS X; Nvidia Shield TV
- Release: February 19, 2013: PlayStation 3, Xbox 360; NA: February 19, 2013; JP: February 21, 2013 (PS3); EU: February 21, 2013; AU: February 26, 2013 Windows; WW: January 9, 2014 OS X; WW: September 25, 2014 Nvidia Shield TV; WW: January 7, 2016
- Genres: Action-adventure, hack and slash
- Mode: Single-player

Metal Gear Rising: Revengeance (Note: Japanese: METAL GEAR RISING REVENGEANCE(メタルギア ライジング リベンジェンス), Hepburn: Metaru Gia Raijingu Ribenjensu) is a 2013 action-adventure game developed by PlatinumGames and published by Konami. It was released for the PlayStation 3 and Xbox 360 in February 2013, Windows and OS X in January and September 2014, and Nvidia Shield TV in January 2016. It is a spin-off in the Metal Gear series, set four years after the events of Metal Gear Solid 4: Guns of the Patriots. It features returning Metal Gear character Raiden as he confronts a private military company (PMC) that intends to destabilize peaceful nations for profit. The gameplay focuses on fighting enemies using a sword and other weapons to perform combos and counterattacks. Through the use of "Blade Mode", Raiden can dismember enemies in slow motion and steal health items from their bodies. The series' usual stealth elements are also optional, serving as a means to avoid combat. Two downloadable content chapters were also released, set before the main campaign and centers on Raiden's enemies.

The game was originally developed by Kojima Productions, which announced the game in 2009 under the title of Metal Gear Solid: Rising. However, the team faced difficulties in developing a game based on swordplay, and supervising director Hideo Kojima subsequently halted development until a solution could be found. The project resurfaced in late 2011 under its finalized title, with PlatinumGames as the new developer. The game underwent significant changes in gameplay mechanics and storyline with PlatinumGames' involvement, although Kojima Productions retained responsibility for the overall plot and Raiden's design.

Upon its release in February 2013, Metal Gear Rising: Revengeance was well received by critics, with praise for its sophisticated cutting system, use of Metal Gear elements to complement the story despite its focus on action, soundtrack, and boss fights. Some criticism was directed at its camera mechanics and the short length of the campaign. The game was estimated to have sold more than 2 million copies.

== Gameplay ==
Raiden attacking an enemy in Blade Mode. The top-left bars indicate Raiden's health and remaining time in Blade Mode. The counter on the right tallies the player's number of hits.

Players assume control of Raiden, a katana-wielding cyborg. He is initially playable in his "Standard Body" form, which resembles the body used by Raiden in Metal Gear Solid 4, but with a more natural-looking face. The player can alter Raiden's appearance through alternative skins. Unlike previous titles in the Metal Gear series, where players try not to be noticed by enemies, Rising is action-oriented, focusing on sword fighting and a sophisticated cutting system to fight and defeat enemies. Although Raiden's main weapon is his high-frequency blade, he can also use other replacement blades, sub-weapons, and secondary weapons. Raiden's sub-weapons include two kinds of rocket launchers, four kinds of grenades and several other tools, such as the iconic cardboard box, an empty oil drum, and a 3D photo frame. Other melee weapons can be obtained after defeating the game's bosses.

The game's cutting system allows players to engage in melee combat, as well as to precisely slash enemies and objects at will along a geometrical plane using the "Blade Mode" game mechanic. Virtually any object in the game can be cut, including vehicles and enemies, though elements of the environment were intentionally limited to structures such as pillars and walls to better facilitate the game. Entering Blade Mode produces a special targeting reticle in the form of a transparent blue plane which can be moved and rotated freely, tracing holographic orange lines across the surfaces of targets to indicate exactly where they will be cut; it can also be used to enter a bullet time state, giving players the opportunity to precisely cut targets during moments of action, such as slicing through an airborne target multiple times before it hits the ground. Blade Mode can be employed strategically: for example, disabling opponents, finding weak points and gaps in armor, severing support columns to collapse ceilings or walls onto enemies, deflecting enemy fire, or cutting through objects to remove enemy cover. However, entering Blade Mode reduces Raiden's energy, which if reduced to a certain level prevents Blade Mode from being used. Throughout the story, the player obtains "Ripper Mode", a state which greatly enhances Raiden's power for a limited time as it quickly consumes energy.

Raiden has the ability to parry attacks even when his back is turned, allowing him to counterattack enemies and perform multiple combos. The player also has access to a "Ninja Run" mode, which drastically increases Raiden's speed and allows him to deflect bullets and climb certain areas for ambushes. Another key feature is called Zandatsu (斬奪; lit. "cut and take"), wherein parts, energy, ammunition, items, and occasionally data are taken from the bodies of dismembered cyborgs and robots. This maneuver can be employed when slicing an enemy through a small indicated red box during Blade Mode, and fully restores Raiden's health and energy. When completing a mission, the player will be rewarded with a specific number of points depending on their performance and will receive a grade, with the highest being "S". These points allow players to purchase upgrades for Raiden's equipment.

The player can carry out reconnaissance using Raiden's visor, which can highlight enemies through walls. Hiding in a cardboard box and oil can hides the player's presence from enemies, making sneaking easier. The player also gains assistance from Blade Wolf, a canine-like robot that scouts and gathers intel for Raiden.

== Synopsis ==
=== Setting and characters ===
The events of Metal Gear Rising: Revengeance are set in the year 2018, four years after the events of Metal Gear Solid 4: Guns of the Patriots. The Patriots, a powerful deep state running the world's war economy, have been destroyed, and PMCs have splintered into numerous factions. The player controls Raiden (Quinton Flynn), a former Liberian child soldier turned into a cyborg that now works for the PMC Maverick Security Consulting, Inc. Raiden is supported by his Maverick colleagues, consisting of Russian pointman Boris Popov (JB Blanc), military advisor Kevin Washington (Phil LaMarr), computer specialist Courtney Collins (Kari Wahlgren), and cybernetics expert Wilhelm "Doktor" Voigt (Jim Ward). Returning from Metal Gear Solid 4 is Sunny Emmerich (Cristina Pucelli), a child prodigy and friend of Raiden working at Solis Space and Aeronautics.

Rival PMC Desperado Enforcement LLC serves as the game's main antagonist; Desperado aims to destabilize peaceful nations and preserve conflict, allowing them to reap the financial rewards and technological advancements of the war economy. Desperado operative Samuel Rodrigues (Philip Anthony-Rodriguez), also known as Jetstream Sam, serves as Raiden's rival, with a conversation between the two in the beginning influencing Raiden. Sam works with an elite team of Desperado cyborg assassins named the "Winds of Destruction": Sundowner (Crispin Freeman), Desperado's de facto leader, who wields machetes that combine into a large pair of pincers, and who also has a set of reactive armor shields connected to his body; Mistral (Salli Saffioti), the team's only female member, whose frame can support multiple additional arms, some of which combine into a staff that she can use as a whip; and Monsoon (John Kassir), who wields dual sai and uses magnetism to manipulate large objects and separate his body into individual components, while retaining control over each part.

The IF Prototype LQ-84i, later named Blade Wolf (Michael Beattie), is a state-of-the-art artificial intelligence housed within a quadrupedal combat robot who serves initially as Raiden's Desperado-controlled enemy, but it is later reprogrammed to aid Raiden and Maverick. Additionally, Colorado Senator and potential presidential candidate Steven Armstrong (Alastair Duncan) is involved in Desperado's activities. An additional member of the Winds of Destruction, Khamsin (Benito Martinez), appears as part of the Blade Wolf DLC chapter.

=== Plot ===
While providing security detail in an unnamed African country for its prime minister, N'Mani, Raiden and his team are attacked by rogue PMC Desperado. While Raiden fends off their forces, their leader Sundowner kidnaps and assassinates N'Mani. Raiden is badly wounded in a duel with Sundowner's lackey "Jetstream" Samuel Rodrigues, losing his left eye and arm, but Boris saves him as Sundowner and Sam escape. Doktor later repairs and upgrades Raiden with a more capable cyborg body.

Three weeks later, Raiden infiltrates the breakaway Georgian statelet of Abkhazia after learning that Desperado is leading a military coup there. He plans to capture Andrey Dolzaev, a Chechen extremist leading the forces, to force Desperado into standing down. Desperado anticipates the move and assigns a prototype AI robot designated LQ-84i to stop Raiden. Raiden defeats the LQ-84i in combat and later has Doktor rebuild it as an ally, naming it Blade Wolf. He faces further opposition from Mistral, the commander of Desperado's forces in Abkhazia. After Raiden kills Mistral in combat, Dolzaev commits suicide by blowing up an oil tank he is standing on.

Maverick assigns Raiden to investigate a research facility in Guadalajara, Mexico. There, Raiden meets an orphan named George, who was brought to the facility to have his brain—along with the brains of several other orphans—surgically removed and shipped to the United States. He learns that Sundowner inspected the facility in the company of Senator Steven Armstrong, creating an alliance between Desperado and World Marshal, a major PMC Armstrong has invested in. World Marshal plans to condition the children to become killers through constant VR training, and place them inside cybernetic bodies to create new soldiers, similar to Raiden. Raiden rescues George and the children to Doktor.

Furious at their unwillingness to take action against World Marshal, Raiden resigns from Maverick and, with Blade Wolf by his side, launches a one-man assault on World Marshal's headquarters in Denver, Colorado. Though no longer Raiden's employer, Maverick unofficially provides discreet support throughout. After he fights his way through the city's privatized police force and soldiers, Raiden encounters Sam and another operative named Monsoon, who, using technology they developed, force Raiden to listen to the thoughts of the police officers and soldiers he kills, which cause him to become extremely conflicted over his actions. Eventually, this leads to him unleashing his repressed personality of "Jack The Ripper", which he developed due to the Sears Program when he was young. He kills Monsoon and infiltrates World Marshal's headquarters before locating and killing Sundowner. There, he discovers that Armstrong is using Desperado to distract Raiden while readying "Operation Tecumseh", a plan to assassinate the President of the United States during peace negotiations with Pakistan to ensure another war on terror.

While Doktor recovers the children's brains, Raiden seeks help from Sunny Emmerich to reach Pakistan in time to stop Armstrong. He encounters Sam on the way and the pair engage in a final duel, from which Raiden emerges victorious. Sunny helps Raiden travel to Shabhazabad Air Base in Pakistan, where he is attacked by Metal Gear EXCELSUS, a hexapedal mecha piloted by Armstrong who takes down Blade Wolf. He reveals that Operation Tecumseh was a false flag operation, and that his true plan was to frame Desperado for killing American military personnel at the base to turn the American people against them and in favor of World Marshal. Armstrong, being a primary shareholder of the latter, would win the subsequent Presidential election in a landslide, giving him free rein to realize his vision of a social Darwinist society, where the strong will thrive and the weak will be purged. Raiden destroys EXCELSUS, but discovers that Armstrong has augmented himself with nanomachines that harden in response to physical trauma, destroying Raiden's high-frequency blade. Blade Wolf intervenes and gives Raiden Sam's sword, which allows him to defeat and kill Armstrong.

Doktor receives approval to create a new cyborg staffing firm, allowing them to shelter the orphans' brains and potentially give them a chance at a better life, while George and Blade Wolf go live at Solis with Sunny. Although Desperado is defeated and the brain-taking operation defunct, World Marshal remains in business. Raiden decides against rejoining Maverick, resolving to fight his own war.

== Development ==
=== As Metal Gear Solid: Rising ===
A promotional render of Metal Gear Solid: Rising

After Metal Gear Solid 4: Guns of the Patriots was released, game designer Hideo Kojima started coming up with ideas for another Metal Gear game. The game was meant to feature The Boss and her comrades, the Cobra Unit, as main characters. However, the lack of experience from the younger staff in charge and the lack of involvement from Kojima resulted in this project being scrapped. Afterwards, a member suggested turning it into a sidestory focused on Raiden since said character was featured in Guns of the Patriots and the staff agreed to develop Metal Gear Solid: Rising. The narrative was meant to chronicle the series of events that resulted in the transformation of Raiden into his cyborg ninja persona in Metal Gear Solid 4 albeit with a different and somewhat more crude appearance.

The game was first hinted during Kojima's keynote presentation at the 2009 Game Developers Conference in San Francisco where the presentation's end showed "The Next MGS" with Raiden next to the title. Prior to the announcements of the game, Kojima Productions featured a countdown timer on their website until the day that Rising was announced. The series' traditional tagline of "Tactical Espionage Action" was also altered to "Lightning Bolt Action," a play on the fact that Raiden's name is Japanese for "thunder and lightning." The game was officially announced at E3 2009 at the Microsoft press conference. A teaser trailer was released by Kojima, although he would be serving only as executive producer for the game, as all of his input was with Metal Gear Solid: Peace Walker. The game was initially only announced for the Xbox 360 but was later confirmed for the PS3 and Windows platforms. It would use a brand new game engine, rather than the Metal Gear Solid 4 engine.

The game's original cover artwork was leaked on Xbox Live on June 10, four days before E3 2010. During Microsoft's E3 press conference on June 14, Kojima introduced the game's original lead designer, Mineshi Kimura, who unveiled a new trailer which included cutscene and playing footage. The game's creative producer, Shigenobu Matsuyama, and Kimura again presented the trailer on June 16 during Konami's E3 press conference, then took stage, further clarifying the game's mechanic. Concern had risen over the game's realistic depictions of human dismemberment during player-controlled sequences, a hard limit for Japan's Computer Entertainment Rating Organization, which may necessitate censorship in the domestic Japanese release of the game. As a result, the version of the E3 2010 trailer available for viewing on the game's official Japanese website has had such scenes removed.

Concept art on display at the Art of Yoji Shinkawa exhibit in 2011

Kimura stated that Rising would carry on the series tradition of encouraging players to progress through the game without killing. While it was considered important to give players freedom, Matsuyama indicated that players would never be rewarded for killing human opponents, and that the game would be designed so that players would never be forced to do so. Specifically, the game's stealth elements would have emphasized Raiden's considerable speed and agility through what Matsuyama describes as "hunting stealth." Unlike the stealth of previous titles, in which players remained hidden and avoided combat, players in Rising would instead quickly stalk their enemies and use acrobatic maneuvers to stay out of sight while closing in. This ties in with the game's Zandatsu feature, allowing them to prey upon enemies to obtain weapons, items, and energy. Kimura noted that he wanted Raiden to be able to move like he did in the Metal Gear Solid 4 trailers, and to show "the stealth of the sword, and the strength of not even losing to the gun, and the fear and power you have with this blade."

At TGS 2010, Sony announced that the PS3 version of Metal Gear Solid: Rising would be playable in 3D. In January 2011, several pieces of concept art for Rising were displayed at Yoji Shinkawa's two-week exhibit, The Art of Yoji Shinkawa, hosted by the Konami Style Shop in Tokyo. During late 2011, it was announced over that Matsuyama had moved to a different division within Konami and that Yuji Korekado had taken over as the game's lead producer. Additionally, Kojima said Metal Gear Solid: Rising is "moving forward"; Kojima had stated the game remains significantly different from existing Metal Gear games, although he has retained an element of control over it and will not let it stray too far from the series' roots. He advised fans to try it even though the game would not focus on stealth.

=== Move to PlatinumGames ===
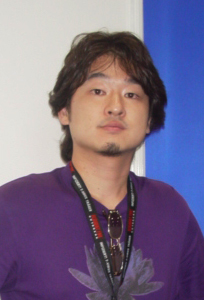
Atsushi Inaba of PlatinumGames was requested by Hideo Kojima to work on the game.

Despite having thought out stories and scenarios for the game, Kojima Productions were finding it difficult to design the game around the cutting concept. The project was quietly cancelled in late 2010, and whilst Kojima had considered moving the project to developers abroad, he felt that a Japanese developer would be more suited to produce a ninja action game. In early 2011, Kojima met PlatinumGames' Atsushi Inaba, who asked him about the state of Metal Gear Solid: Rising, and Kojima later requested him to work on the game. This new version, titled Metal Gear Rising: Revengeance, was first revealed via a trailer shown at the Spike Video Game Awards on December 10, 2011. PlatinumGames requested a change of setting in order to have less restrictions on the creation of the game. Shortly after starting development, PlatinumGames discarded the stealth element, with Kojima noting that the original staff did not find it to fit with high-speed action. However, it was later incorporated again as Inaba found the original game system too "dull."

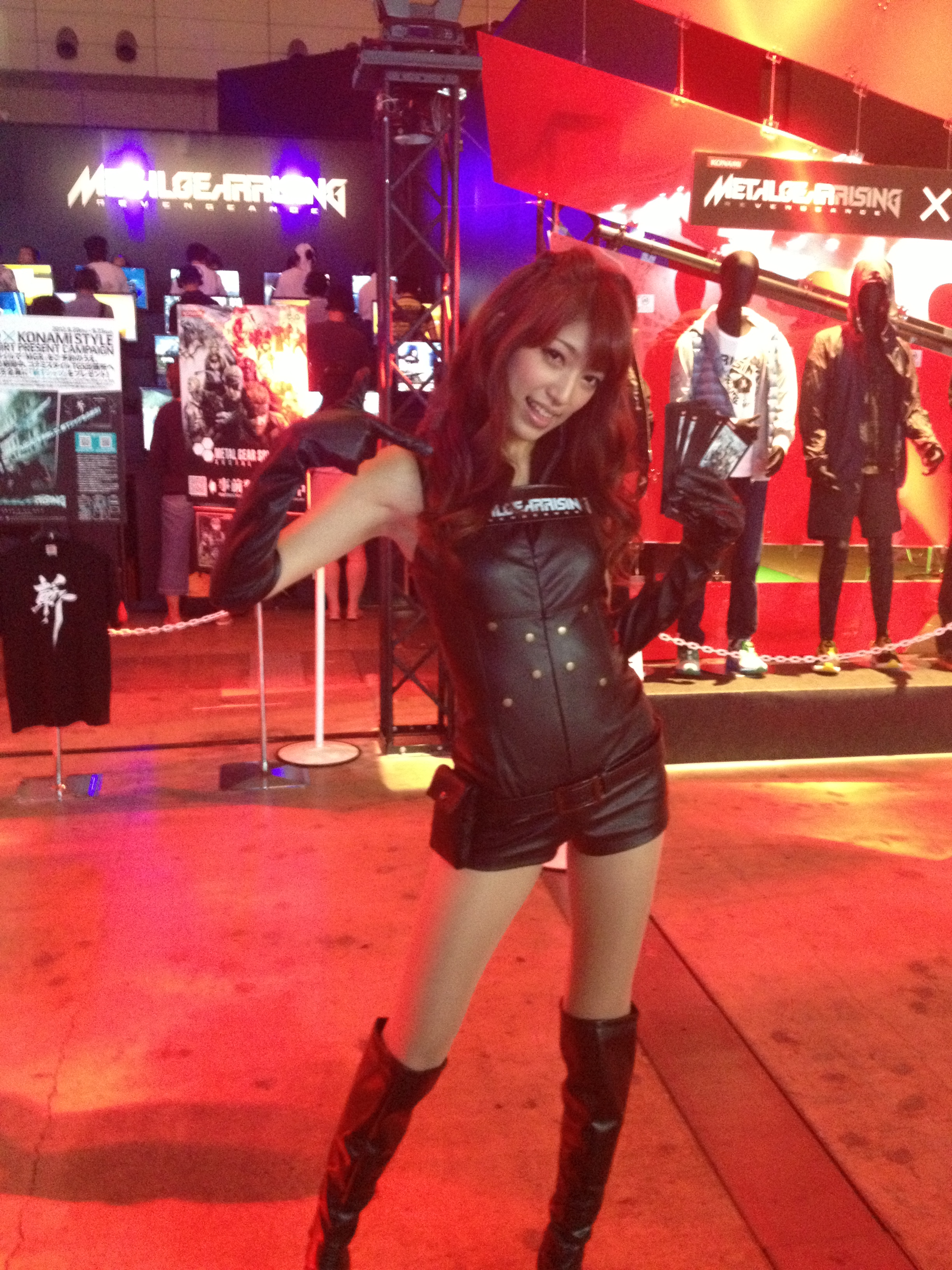
Model Serina Mochizuki promoting the game at Tokyo Game Show 2012

The first trailer confirmed that Raiden would once again be voiced by Quinton Flynn, who had previously stated that Konami had not contacted him regarding the game. The game's title was changed to Metal Gear Rising: Revengeance, with "Revengeance" coming from Kojima Productions' desire "to get revenge or vengeance on the original failed Metal Gear Solid: Rising project" while the stating "Rising" represents Raiden's character. Kojima also confirmed Rising would run at 60 frames per second, a requirement he personally requested of PlatinumGames.

Konami's Martin Scheider assured the game was "in safe hands" owing to the collaboration between Metal Gear veteran Yuji Korekado and Inaba, the former supervising the game. As in the original scrapped version, Korekado stated that the staff's objective was to make Raiden's action scenes from Metal Gear Solid 4 playable. Kojima Productions originally planned to release Metal Gear Rising: Revengeance in Japan without a Japanese voice localization but in August 2012, it was revealed the game would have Japanese audio confirming new and returning actors. The first Japanese language trailer was released shortly afterwards. Inaba stated that the PlayStation 3 would be the lead platform. This decision was made in order to avoid a repeat of the performance issues that Bayonetta had on the console.

The game was playable for the first time at E3 2012 during early June, with Kojima having been involved in its production. In promoting the game, during April 2012, Konami sent a replica of Raiden's severed arm to various video game publications. The arm contained a small teaser from the game in the form of a live-action scene. In following weeks, the official Metal Gear Rising website was launched, showing a longer version of the scene as well as new ones. Artist Yoji Shinkawa worked on the game but only to design Raiden, while freelancer artist Kenichirou Yoshimura is the character designer whose objective was making his work fit with Shinkawa's style.

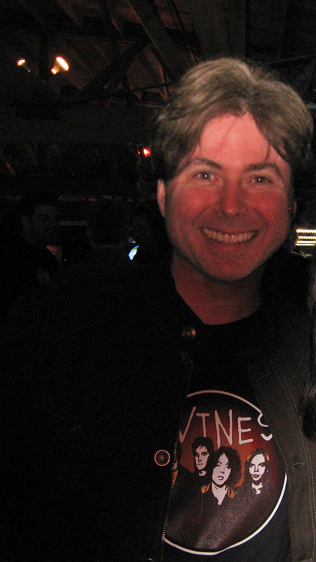
Quinton Flynn voices the lead character Raiden.

The rewrite of the game's script took two months for Kojima Productions to make, in contrast to the original one (which took ten months), with the scriptwriter being Etsu Tamari. Tamari often discussed with director Kenji Saito when the two studios had different opinions regarding the story. The plot was written with the idea of being accessible to people who had not played previous Metal Gear games. There was also a need to reduce the length of cutscenes to better balance out with play time. However, no part of the script was removed in the process. Human soldiers were removed from the game to avoid censorship issues in Japan. Tamari wanted to portray Raiden as a more mature person who wishes to take Snake's footsteps, though his new design was also meant to show a darker side which resulted in the staff calling him "Black Raiden". Tamari stated he needed a new character that would bring him support in the form of the dog-like robot named Bladewolf; similar to how Snake guides Raiden in Sons of Liberty, the mature Raiden acts like a mentor to Bladewolf across the story resulting in his character arc. Meanwhile, the final villain, Senator Armstrong, was loosely based on Raiden's rival from previous games, Vamp, as both are characters who contrast the cybernetic bodies explored in the games.

Kenyu Horiuchi returned to voice Raiden in Revengeance, taking a liking to it, as he acted as the lead for the first time but was still glad that he got meet new actors who appeared in the game, most notably the actor behind Doktor. The actors also liked the inclusion of Raiden's sidekick, LQ-84i (later renamed Bladewolf), as they believe that ninjas like Raiden obligatory need dogs as allies. Another relationship the actors liked was Raiden's exchanges with Courtney due to few female characters being present in the game but felt they made the characters get along properly. Horiuchi felt confident in being in doing Raiden's voice as the lead, believing his thirty years of experience made him suitable for the role. Quinton Flynn felt honored for taking the role of Raiden again, having received a "Behind The Voice Actors" award for his work. In recording, Raiden did three types of each line, respecting his own character to get the best voice out. He wanted the character of Raiden would take after Solid Snake's death who is said to have died after Guns of the Patriots. He also enjoyed the series' sense of humor when Raiden dresses as a mariachi in Mexico.

=== Music ===
The game's score was composed by Jamie Christopherson, with additional music by Graeme Cornies, Brian Pickett, James Chapple, and David Kelly, and directed by Naoto Tanaka. As a result of the game being focused on action rather than stealth like the previous Metal Gear games, the music has a different style. Director Kenji Saito proposed the idea of heavy and fast music featuring lyrics to Kojima Productions. When the studio accepted Saito's idea, the two developers started composition together. Christopherson also contributed by writing thirteen vocal songs. The soundtrack features vocals by artists including John Bush, Tyson Yen, Free Dominguez, Jason C. Miller, and Jimmy Gnecco, with contributions by Logan Mader, The Maniac Agenda, and Ferry Corsten. An album featuring themes from the game was featured in a limited-edition release. Another album, titled Metal Gear Rising Revengeance Vocal Tracks, featuring 29 tracks, was released on February 20, 2013.

== Release ==
The demo version was initially released as a bonus included in the Zone of the Enders: HD Collection, which was released for the PlayStation 3 and Xbox 360 on October 30, 2012. A public demo of Metal Gear Rising: Revengeance was released in Japan on December 13, 2012, on the PlayStation Store. The North American demo was later released on the Xbox Live Marketplace and PlayStation Store on January 22, 2013.

The full version was released in North America on February 19, 2013, and in Europe on February 21 for the PlayStation 3 and Xbox 360 consoles. Although it was also planned to be released for both consoles on February 21 in Australia, shipping issues delayed it to February 26. The game was released in Japan on February 21 for the PlayStation 3, with the Xbox 360 release there cancelled. While a Windows version of Metal Gear Solid: Rising was initially planned, release for this platform was put on hold. However, Kojima Productions said they would consider it after the release of the console versions. The Windows version was then announced in May 2013, and released on January 9, 2014. The PlayStation 3 version was added to PlayStation Plus in November 2013.

In Japan, Konami released two collectors' editions. The first one, the "Premium Package", contains an artbook by Yoji Shinkawa and a soundtrack album. The second limited edition is the "Premium Package Special Edition", including all the contents from the first package with the addition of an action figure of Raiden. The English collector's edition features a soundtrack, a steel case, and a lamp containing a small-scale replica of Raiden's sword. An exclusive download edition titled the Ultimate Edition was released on the PlayStation Network on May 21, 2013. This edition includes the full game plus all downloadable content. The same version was released in stores with the label of Special Edition on December 5, 2013, in Japan.

The Windows version was released on January 9, 2014. The version briefly required online connection until a fix was issued on January 10, 2014. It was claimed that the requirement was an accidental bug. The Windows version has been region locked, making the game unavailable in India and Japan. The game was briefly unavailable for purchase in Ireland. The game is also not available for purchase through Steam in Southeast Asia, but is available in disc format for the PlayStation 3. The game also has region locked serials and cross-region gifting. In March 2015, Metal Gear Rising: Revengeance was confirmed to be coming to the Nvidia Shield Console. In January 2017, the OS X version of Revengeance became unplayable due to an issue with its DRM after Transgaming, who developed the port, went out of business.

In July 2024, a DRM-free version of the game was made available on GOG. It shares the same regional restrictions as the Steam version, making it unavailable in Southeast Asia and Japan.

== Downloadable content ==
The downloadable content for Rising consists of five cyborg body types for Raiden, a set of "VR Missions", and two story-based campaigns starring a different character each. The DLC armors were available as pre-order incentives through different participating retailers that varied between region. The VR Missions set and bonus campaigns were made available during the months following the game's release. All the downloadable content has since been made available for general users on PlayStation Network and Xbox Live and are included as standard features in the Windows version of the game.

=== Body types ===
Body	Japan	North America	Europe	Description
Cyborg Ninja	Konamistyle	GameStop	Included with the game	Dresses Raiden like Gray Fox from the original Metal Gear Solid. Includes a bonus main weapon called the Fox Blade.
MGS4 Raiden	Amazon	Standard DLC	Standard DLC	Dresses Raiden with his original body from Guns of the Patriots.
White Armor	Konamistyle, L-Paca	Best Buy	Zavvi	A white version of Raiden's Custom Body which allows him to carry more health and energy items.
Inferno Armor	Tsutaya	Amazon	Game	A crimson version of Raiden's Custom Body which allows him to carry more thrown explosives.
Commando Armor	Geo Corporation	N/A	Amazon	An olive drab version of Raiden's Custom Body which allows him to carry more rocket launchers.

=== Campaigns ===
Title	Release date	Description
VR Missions	April 2, 2013	A set of 30 additional VR Missions for Raiden. In Japan, this expansion pack includes a new weapon called the Hebidamashi (蛇魂), a wooden sword which talks with Solid Snake's voice (as portrayed by Akio Otsuka). The Hebidamashi was not available in the English editions of the game.
Jetstream	April 9, 2013	A campaign starring Raiden's rival Samuel Rodrigues, which depicts how he joined Desperado Enforcement. Includes five bonus VR Missions for Sam.
Bladewolf	May 9, 2013	A campaign starring the robotic canine LQ-84i, which depicts its involvement with Desperado Enforcement prior to its first encounter with Raiden. The campaign features an original antagonist named Khamsin, a fifth member of Desperado Enforcement not seen in the main story. Includes five bonus VR Missions for the LQ-84i.

== Reception ==
Reception

Aggregate scores
Aggregator	Score
Metacritic	(PC) 83/100 (X360) 82/100 (PS3) 80/100
OpenCritic	94% recommend (Note: Based on 19 reviews.)

Review scores
Publication	Score
1Up.com	B
Computer and Video Games	7.5/10
Eurogamer	9/10
Famitsu	39/40
Game Informer	7.75/10
GameSpot	8.5/10
GamesTM	9/10
GameTrailers	9.2/10
IGN	8.5/10
Play	91%
Polygon	9/10
VideoGamer.com	7/10
Dengeki PlayStation	365/400
The Escapist	4/5

Producer Atsushi Inaba took to his Twitter feed to address fans' concerns over the project. He acknowledged the mixed reaction to the unveiling of Rising, but hoped players would spot "a glimpse of the future" in the trailer. Inaba promised its "love and respect will shine through." The negative reactions came from fans noticing the genre switching to a hack and slash game. Inaba expressed his dismay at the fans' comparison of Metal Gear Rising with Ninja Gaiden 3, having criticized the latter game. During Games Convention 2012, Kojima Productions noted the demos were well received by fans due to the number of attendees that wanted to play it. They added that feedback for the demo was positive. Inaba noted on his Twitter account that several Western gamers believed the game was too short based on a results screen that showed a clear time of five-and-a-half hours. He clarified that the screen did not count cutscenes or failed attempts to beat the game, only taking in account when players pass the stages. This system had been used by PlatinumGames since Bayonetta in order to evaluate players. As a result, Inaba felt disappointed by people's attempts to criticize the game based on a single screen. In September 2012, Metal Gear Rising: Revengeance was one of the winners from Computer Entertainment Supplier's Association's Japan Game Awards.

Metal Gear Rising: Revengeance received "generally favorable" reviews, according to review aggregator Metacritic. Famitsu scored the game a near-perfect 39 out of 40. Play and GamesTM also shared positive impressions, with the latter calling Metal Gear Rising "almost certainly the best Metal Gear game released this generation."

Eurogamer writer Rich Stanton was pleased with the creation of the Metal Gear spin-off expanding the franchise. It was noted that the game was close to receiving a perfect 10 were it not for camera issues. Other sites noted similar issues during their reviews, due to the fact it could not keep up with the fast action sequences. The game's action was praised by several publications, stating it would be appealing for casual players and Metal Gear fans. Bob Mackey enjoyed the game but felt that the game still had the mark of a "rescued product": "Revengeance isn't Platinum at the top of their game; it's the studio making the best of a bad situation -- even so, a troubled Platinum production still has plenty to offer." Some focused on the cutting system which allowed players to cut through not only enemies but also the environment, while IGN's Mitch Dyer commented on how the number of subweapons improved the game's variety despite a lack of flow when changing them. Boss fights have also been referred as one of the game's strongest points due to their use of cutscenes and music.

On the other hand, Joe Juba from Game Informer was less favourable, stating that the combat was the only real highlight of the game, reserved about the superficiality of even the combat element itself, commenting "[the combat] is entertaining, but 'style over substance' is the defining theme." He found that the game's shortcomings made it less interesting than previous Metal Gear games and Bayonetta, also developed by PlatinumGames. Computer and Video Games' Matt Gilman agreed with Juba, adding that the game's cons, while annoying, could have been easily fixed, citing the lack of a defense action rather than parrying. Videogamer.com praised the game's opening level while criticizing the camera system: "scenery has an annoying habit of getting in the way: one encounter in a tiny room saw me fighting with an obstacle obscuring both Raiden and his opponents with no way of manoeuvring the camera into a better position." The campaign has also been criticized for a short running time, though Miguel Concepción from The Escapist cited the multiple challenging difficulties as a way to encourage the players to play through the game more than once.

The plot was found to be on par with other games in the franchise. Raiden's role and development were found to be appealing, with GameSpot's Peter Brown praising his violent attitude that made him an outstanding anti-hero, whereas GameTrailers noted how Raiden contrasted his Metal Gear Solid 2: Sons of Liberty persona that had been criticized back in 2001. IGN wrote that fans of Metal Gear Solid 4 would enjoy the game more because Raiden can replicate his moves from that game's cutscenes in gameplay. Eurogamer deemed Revengeance a major change in Raiden's characterization, referring to him as "the ultimate cyborg and also the ultimate killer" based on his darker persona that is explored in combat. Critics praised the design of the game's bosses, while Samuel was noted to have a good rivalry with Raiden that helped develop the latter. Despite being a spin-off and lacking the series' protagonist Solid Snake, Concepción found the setting post-Guns of the Patriots to contain several classic Metal Gear elements that old players would find familiar. However, Game Informer criticized the new characters as "uninteresting and poorly developed".

=== Sales ===
PlatinumGames' president Tatsuya Minami stated that he expected good sales from the game due to strong marketing and being part of the Metal Gear series. Shortly after its release, Hideo Kojima mentioned having been pleased due to Metal Gear Rising: Revengeance selling well around the world, but did not share numbers. During its first week, the game topped Japan's Media Create and Enterbrain Japan charts list, selling 308,681 units according to the former and 335,791 units according to the latter. Among the Famitsu 2013 Top 100, a listing of the top 100 Japanese retail software sales for the year of 2013 from data collected by Famitsu's parent company Enterbrain, the PS3 version of Metal Gear Rising: Revengeance ranked 11th with 470,597 physical retail sales within Japan.

The game received a Gold Prize from the 2013 PlayStation Awards, for the PS3 version selling more than 500,000 units in Asia. During its debut in the United Kingdom, it was the second-best-selling game following Crysis 3. As of July 2024, Steam Spy estimates the game sold more than 2 million units on Steam.

== Legacy ==
Hideo Kojima mentioned in January 2012 that depending on the game's popularity, the staff would make a franchise based on it. He has viewed the relationship between Kojima Productions and PlatinumGames as very positive and suggested that a sequel to Metal Gear Rising may be possible in the near future. However, Kojima would only approve of a sequel if PlatinumGames were to develop it, stating that "no one else could [do] it". Following the game's release, Kojima was impressed with PlatinumGames' work in the game, stating the franchise had a "lot of hugely, insanely critical fans" who would harshly scrutinize issues. As the original project was a prequel to Metal Gear Solid 4: Guns of the Patriots, Kojima would like the concept to be revisited, although he thought that PlatinumGames would have problems with it as a result of being an "interquel." As a result, he was unable to confirm if such a story could be developed in the future.

On February 22, 2013, Hideo Kojima told SPOnG that he would like to make a sequel of Metal Gear Rising, stating that if it does happen, he would like PlatinumGames to develop it. Kojima also stated that he would like the sequel to star Gray Fox and have him battle "nano machine-powered zombies." He also stated that he offered to write the story himself, but PlatinumGames did not seem interested. Etsu Tamari, chief story writer for both Metal Gear Rising and the original Metal Gear Solid: Rising, has expressed interest in reusing the original idea for a potential sequel.

In August 2013, Konami posted a survey for Metal Gear Rising on their official site asking fans if they want a sequel and what they would like to see in it. On January 31, 2015, a trailer for upcoming PS4 games at the 2015 Taipei Game Show teased a brief image of the number 2 in a similar font design to that of Revengeance. However, Kojima Productions later made statements that the "2" was unrelated to the Metal Gear franchise.

Writer Etsu Tamari expressed joy in the final product and expected that in the future, the team could make another game focused on Raiden. Quinton Flynn stated he was pleased with Raiden's role in Revengeance and stated he would have liked a new sequel with him as the lead. However, the dispute between Konami and Kojima Productions had left him worried as to the sequel's future.

Several video game publications, as well as Armstrong's voice actor Alastair Duncan himself, have praised the game's prediction of the resurgence of right-wing populism in the United States, comparing Senator Armstrong to United States President Donald Trump. Similarly to Trump, Armstrong uses reactionary and anti-establishment rhetoric to win over the American public, as well as the slogan "Make America Great Again" (which had also been used by Ronald Reagan), with the game having been released years before Trump's 2016 presidential campaign.

The narrative, characters, and soundtrack were noted to contribute to the game's resurgence in popularity as a result of Internet memes, including the handling of politics and characters reacting in comical fashion to set pieces and dialogue, the most prominent example being with main antagonist Senator Armstrong, as well as Jetstream Sam. As a result, concurrent players for the game are believed to have gone up by ten times in a month in 2022.
