= Kenyu Horiuchi =

Japanese voice actor and narrator (born 1957)

- 堀内 賢雄
- Born: July 30, 1957 (age 69); Gotemba, Shizuoka, Japan
- Occupations: Voice actor; narrator
- Years active: 1983–present
- Agent: Kenyu Office
- Spouse: Chihiro Natsuzaka
- Children: 2
- Website: Official profile

Kenyu Horiuchi (堀内 賢雄, Horiuchi Ken'yū; born July 30, 1957) is a Japanese voice actor and narrator.

In 2002, he founded the voice acting management office Kenyu Office. He is best known for dubbing over Brad Pitt, whom he met at Japan's premiere of Bullet Train, Charlie Sheen, Ben Stiller, Ben Affleck, Ian Ziering, Brendan Fraser, John Stamos, especially for Jesse Katsopolis in the ABC sitcom Full House, and many more.

== Filmography ==
=== Television animation ===
- 1983: Captain Tsubasa (Taki, Pierre)
- 1983: Ginga Hyōryū Vifam (Rerela Jeda)
- 1986: Mobile Suit Gundam ZZ (Mashymre Cello)
- 1986: Transformers 2010 (Springer)
- 1987: Mister Ajikko (Chef Shimonaka)
- 1989: Tenkū Senki Shurato (Ten-ō Hyūga)
- 1990: Kyatto Ninden Teyandee (Narrator)
- 1990: Nadia: The Secret of Blue Water (Sanson)
- 1992: Tekkaman Blade (Balzac Asimov)
- 1993: Mobile Suit Victory Gundam (Hangelg Ewin)
- 1994: YuYu Hakusho (Hokushin)
- 1996: After War Gundam X (Jamil Neate)
- 1996: B't X (Metalface)
- 1998: Cowboy Bebop (Gren)
- 1999: Monster Rancher anime (Durahan)
- 2000: Platinumhugen Ordian (Hideaki Sanada)
- 2001: Pecola (Gazelle)
- 2001: Shaman King (Mikihisa Asakura, Ponchi)
- 2002: Mirage of Blaze (Kosaka Danjou)
- 2002: Saint Seiya (Libra Dohko)
- 2003: Ai Yori Aoshi (Ruka Saionji)
- 2003: Air Master (Julietta Sakamoto)
- 2003: Pocket Monsters Side Stories (Narrator)
- 2004: Kyo Kara Maoh! (Dan Hiri Weller)
- 2004: Naruto (Tobirama Senju)
- 2005: Animal Yokochō (Yamanami-san)
- 2005: Eyeshield 21 (Leonard Apollo)
- 2005: Gun X Sword (The Claw)
- 2005: Mahoraba (Yukio Haibara (Johnny))
- 2005: Yakitate!! Japan (Brad Kidd)
- 2005: Zatch Bell! (Kieth)
- 2006: Ergo Proxy (Will B. Good)
- 2006: Hataraki Man (Narita)
- 2006: Koi suru Tenshi Angelique ~Kokoro no Mezameru Toki~ (Oscar)
- 2006: Rakugo Tennyo Oyui (San'yūtei Enchō)
- 2006: Super Robot Wars Original Generation: The Inspector (Irmgart Kazahara)
- 2007: Koi suru Tenshi Angelique ~Kagayaki no Ashita~ (Oscar)
- 2007: Dinosaur King (Noratti, a.k.a. Zander)
- 2007: Kaze no Stigma (Burnhart Rhodes)
- 2008: Bleach (Shūsuke Amagai)
- 2008: Gintama (Kintarou)
- 2008: Naruto: Shippuden (Pain, Yahiko)
- 2008: Rosario + Vampire Capu2 (Tosa the Tengu)
- 2008: Spice and Wolf (Marten Liebert)
- 2008: Telepathy Shōjo Ran Jiken Note (Ronpei Isozaki)
- 2008: Tytania (Doctor Lee Zhang-Chen)
- 2009: Genji Monogatari Sennenki (Kiritsubo no Mikado)
- 2009: Guin Saga (Guin)
- 2009: Hajime no Ippo: New Challenger (Suguru Takamura)
- 2009: Shangri-La (Takehiko)
- 2010: Bakuman (Hisashi Sasaki)
- 2010: HeartCatch PreCure! (Coupé, Sora Hanasaki)
- 2010: Nodame Cantabile: Finale (Chiaki Masayuki)
- 2011: Bakuman 2 (Hisashi Sasaki)
- 2011: Gyakkyō Burai Kaiji: Hakairoku-hen (Yohishiro Kurosaki)
- 2011: Kamisama Dolls (Takeshi Hirashiro)
- 2011: Sekai-ichi Hatsukoi (Takafumi Yokozawa)
- 2011: Suite PreCure (Mephisto)
- 2012: Hunter × Hunter (Goto, Ikalgo, Koala)
- 2012: Pocket Monsters: Best Wishes! (Dr. Araragi's father)
- 2012: Toriko (Ichiryuu)
- 2013: Kill la Kill (Barazo Mankanshoku)
- 2013: One Piece (Kin'emon)
- 2014: Naruto: Shippuden (Tobirama Senju, Pain)
- 2014: Baby Steps (Mike)
- 2014: Garo: Honō no Kokuin (Germán Luis)
- 2014: Hero Bank (Adachi Sumimori)
- 2015: Baby Steps Season 2 (Mike)
- 2015: Garo: Guren no Tsuki (Fujiwarano Michinaga)
- 2015: Saint Seiya: Soul of Gold (Libra Dohko)
- 2016: Joker Game (Lieutenant Colonel Yūki)
- 2016: Re:Zero − Starting Life in Another World (Wilhelm van Astrea)
- 2016: Tales of Zestiria the X (Artorius Collbrande)
- 2017: Kamiwaza Wanda (Wonder-Promin)
- 2017: Onihei (Hasegawa Heizō)
- 2017: Youjo Senki (Anson Sue)
- 2017: Mahōjin Guru Guru (Wanchin)
- 2018: Black Clover (Lotus Whomalt)
- 2018: Darling in the Franxx (Werner Frank)
- 2018: Pocket Monsters: Sun & Moon (Samson Oak, Dr. Yukinari Okido, Narrator)
- 2018: Sirius the Jaeger (Willard)
- 2019: Carole & Tuesday (Dahlia)
- 2019: Babylon (Yasutaka Morinaga)
- 2019: Beastars (Oguma)
- 2019: No Guns Life (Mega-armed Tokisada)
- 2020: Dorohedoro (En)
- 2020: Oda Cinnamon Nobunaga (Oda Cinnamon Nobunaga)
- 2020: The Gymnastics Samurai (Noriyuki Amakusa)
- 2021: Back Arrow (Zetsu Daidan)
- 2021: Life Lessons with Uramichi Oniisan (Tekito Derekida)
- 2022: Love of Kill (Euripedes Ritzland)
- 2022: RWBY: Ice Queendom (Taiyang Xiao Long)
- 2022: Golden Kamuy 4th Season (Sergeant Kikuta)
- 2022: Detective Conan: The Culprit Hanzawa (Harufumi Mogi)
- 2022: Shinobi no Ittoki (Kisuke Ninokuru)
- 2023: Saving 80,000 Gold in Another World for My Retirement ("Sore")
- 2023: Kaina of the Great Snow Sea (Halesola)
- 2023: Fate/strange Fake: Whispers of Dawn (Berserker)
- 2023: Ragna Crimson (Borgius)
- 2023: Spy × Family (Matthew McMahon)
- 2024: Fate/strange Fake (Berserker)
- 2025: Sorairo Utility (Chosuke "Cho" Tanabe)
- 2026: Easygoing Territory Defense by the Optimistic Lord (Esparda)
- 2026: Nippon Sangoku (Yayakichi Hei)
- 2027: Sakamoto Days (Byodo)
- 2027: Tenkaichi: The Greatest Warrior Under the Rising Sun (Oda Nobunaga)

=== Original video animation (OVA) ===
- 1987: Bubblegum Crisis (Daley)
- 1989: Blood Reign: Curse of the Yoma (Hikage)
- 1989: Legend of the Galactic Heroes (Anton Ferner)
- 1991: RG Veda (Bishamon-ten)
- 1992: Eternal Filena (Nesuto)
- 1993: The Cockpit (Lt. Rheindars)
- 1997: B'tX Neo (Metalface)
- 2002: Saint Seiya: Hades Chapter - Sanctuary (Libra Dohko Young Form)
- 2005: Saint Seiya: Hades Chapter - Inferno (Libra Dohko Young Form)
- 2006: Fist of the North Star: Legend of Yuria (Toki)
- 2007: Fist of the North Star: Legend of Toki (Toki)
- 2009: Saint Seiya: The Lost Canvas (Altar Hakurei)

=== Original net animation (ONA) ===
- 2023: Pluto (President Alexander)
- 2025: Disney Twisted-Wonderland the Animation (Dark Mirror)
- 2025: Cat's Eye (Shin Kaibara)

=== Theatrical animation ===
- 1984: Macross: Do You Remember Love? (TV Reporter)
- 2001: One Piece: Nejimaki Shima no Bouken (Borodo)
- 2001: Hamtaro: Adventures in Ham-Ham Land (Devil-Ham)
- 2006: Fist of the North Star: Legend of Raoh: Chapter of Death in Love (Toki)
- 2007: Fist of the North Star: Legend of Raoh: Chapter of Fierce Fight (Toki)
- 2009: Redline (Secretary of Defense Titan)
- 2011: Alice in the Country of Hearts (Mary Gowland)
- 2012: s-CRY-ed (Unkei)
- 2014: Sekai-ichi Hatsukoi: Yokozawa Takafumi no Baai (Takafumi Yokozawa)
- 2015: Crayon Shin-Chan: My Moving Story! Cactus Large Attack! (Nene Rodriguez)
- 2017: Godzilla: Planet of the Monsters (Unberto Mori)
- 2020: Pocket Monsters the Movie: Coco (Narrator)
- 2023: City Hunter: Angel Dust (Shin Kaibara)
- 2023: Komada: A Whisky Family (Kō Komada)
- 2025: Mononoke the Movie: The Ashes of Rage (Rōjū Ōtomo)

=== Tokusatsu ===
- 1983: Andro Melos (Andro Wolf)
- 1984: Ultraman Story (Ultraman)
- 1984: Ultraman Zoffy: Ultra Warriors vs. the Giant Monster Army (Ultraman)

=== Video games ===
- 1997: Ayakashi Ninden Kunoichiban (Johnny Tono)
- 1997: Everybody's Golf (Ralf)
- 1998: Radiant Silvergun (Buster)
- 1998: Ehrgeiz (Cloud Strife; arcade version)
- 1999: MediEvil (Sir Daniel Fortesque in Japanese Dub)
- 2000: Hresvelgr: Formula Highpowered (voice-over, Japanese version)
- 2000: Midnight Club: Street Racing (Lukas Howell-Jones in Japanese Dub)
- 2001: Metal Gear Solid 2: Sons of Liberty (Raiden)
- 2004: Metal Gear Solid 3: Snake Eater (Ivan Raikov)
- 2004: Tales of Rebirth (Geyorkias)
- 2006: Pokémon Battle Revolution (Announcer)
- 2007: Ace Combat 6: Fires of Liberation (Louis McKnight)
- 2007: Heart no Kuni no Alice (Mary Gowland, Amusement Park Boss)
- 2007: Mana Khemia: Alchemists of Al-Revis (Gunnar Damm)
- 2008: Mana Khemia 2: Fall of Alchemy (Gunnar Damm)
- 2008: Tales of Hearts (Garnet)
- 2008: Metal Gear Solid 4: Guns of the Patriots (Raiden)
- 2008: Dissidia: Final Fantasy (Emperor)
- 2010: Kingdom Hearts: Birth by Sleep (Prince Charming)
- 2011: Dissidia 012 Final Fantasy (Emperor)
- 2012: Yakuza 5 (Minoru Aoyama)
- 2013: PlayStation All-Stars Battle Royale (Sir Daniel Fortesque and Raiden in Japanese dub)
- 2013: Skylanders: Spyro's Adventure (Flynn the Balloonist in Japanese dub)
- 2013: Metal Gear Rising: Revengeance (Raiden)
- 2014: Granblue Fantasy (Uriel, Bai Ze)
- 2014: Ryū ga Gotoku Ishin! (Katsu Kaishū)
- 2016: Tales of Berseria (Artorius Collbrande)
- 2017: Nioh (Ōtani Yoshitsugu)
- 2018: Dissidia Final Fantasy NT (Emperor)
- 2019: Final Fantasy XIV: Shadowbringers (Fourchenault Leveilleur)
- 2021: Far Cry 6 (Antón Castillo, portrayed by Giancarlo Esposito)
- 2022: Tactics Ogre: Reborn (Balxephon V. Rahms)
- 2022: Fitness Boxing: Fist of the North Star (Toki)
- 2023: Octopath Traveler II (Father)
- 2025: The First Berserker: Khazan (Ozma)
- 2025: Rusty Rabbit (Bower)

==== Unknown date ====
- League of Legends, Twisted Fate
- Ogre Battle (Warren Moon)
- Skylanders: Giants (Flynn the Balloonist in Japanese Dub)
- Super Robot Wars series (Irmgard Kazahara, Duke Fleed (Complete Box only), Jamil Neate, Olson D. Verne, Yllbora Saro, Light Newman, Mashymre Cello)

== Dubbing roles ==
=== Live-action ===
- Brad Pitt
  - Interview with the Vampire (2000 TV Tokyo edition) (Louis de Pointe du Lac)
  - 12 Monkeys (2000 Fuji TV edition) (Jeffrey Goines)
  - Seven (1999 TV Tokyo edition) (Detective David Mills)
  - Sleepers (1999 Fuji TV edition) (Michael Sullivan)
  - Seven Years in Tibet (2000 Fuji TV edition) (Heinrich Harrer)
  - Fight Club (2003 Fuji TV edition) (Tyler Durden)
  - Friends (Will Colbert)
  - Spy Game (2003 Fuji TV edition) (Tom Bishop)
  - Ocean's Eleven (2005 Fuji TV edition) (Rusty Ryan)
  - Full Frontal (Brad Pitt)
  - Ocean's Twelve (2007 NTV edition) (Rusty Ryan)
  - Mr. & Mrs. Smith (2008 NTV edition) (John Smith)
  - Ocean's Thirteen (2010 Fuji TV edition) (Rusty Ryan)
  - The Tree of Life (Mr. O'Brien)
  - World War Z (Gerry Lane)
  - Fury (Don "Wardaddy" Collier)
  - The Big Short (Ben Rickert)
  - Allied (Wing Commander Max Vatan)
  - War Machine (Gen. Glen McMahon)
  - Once Upon a Time in Hollywood (Cliff Booth)
  - The Lost City (Jack Trainer)
  - Bullet Train (Ladybug)
  - Babylon (Jack Conrad)
  - Wolfs (Pam's Man)
  - F1 (Sonny Hayes)
- Charlie Sheen
  - Red Dawn (1987 TBS edition) (Matt Eckert)
  - Platoon (2003 TV Tokyo edition) (Chris Taylor)
  - Navy SEALs (1993 TV Asahi edition) (Lt. Dale Hawkins)
  - Hot Shots! (1995 TV Asahi edition) (Topper Harley)
  - Hot Shots! Part Deux (1996 TV Asahi edition) (Topper Harley)
  - The Three Musketeers (1998 TV Asahi edition) (Aramis)
  - The Chase (1996 TV Asahi edition) (Jackson Hammond)
  - Terminal Velocity (1997 TV Asahi edition) (Richard "Ditch" Brodie)
  - The Arrival (Zane Zaminsky)
  - Money Talks (James Russell)
  - Shadow Conspiracy (Bobby Bishop)
  - Free Money (Bud Dyerson)
  - Postmortem (James McGregor)
  - Rated X (Artie Jay Mitchell)
  - Good Advice (Ryan Edward Turner)
  - Scary Movie 3 (Tom Logan)
  - Wall Street: Money Never Sleeps (Bud "Buddy" Fox)
- Ben Stiller
  - Reality Bites (Michael Grates)
  - Heavyweights (Tony Perkis, Jr. / Tony Perkis, Sr.)
  - Mystery Men (Mr. Furious)
  - The Royal Tenenbaums (Chas Tenenbaum)
  - Zoolander (Derek Zoolander)
  - Duplex (Alex Rose)
  - Starsky & Hutch (David Starsky)
  - Tropic Thunder (Tugg Speedman)
  - The Watch (Evan Trautwig)
  - The Secret Life of Walter Mitty (2019 THE CINEMA edition) (Walter Mitty)
  - Night at the Museum: Secret of the Tomb (Larry Daley)
  - While We're Young (Josh Schrebnick)
  - Zoolander 2 (Derek Zoolander)
  - Hubie Halloween (Hal L.)
  - Locked Down (Guy)
- Brendan Fraser
  - The Passion of Darkly Noon (Darkly Noon)
  - The Mummy (2002 NTV edition) (Rick O'Connell)
  - The Mummy Returns (2004 Fuji TV and 2005 TV Asahi editions) (Rick O'Connell)
  - The Quiet American (Alden Pyle)
  - Crash (Rick Cabot)
  - Journey to the Center of the Earth (2010 TV Asahi edition) (Prof. Trevor Anderson)
  - The Mummy: Tomb of the Dragon Emperor (2010 Fuji TV edition) (Rick O'Connell)
  - Breakout (Jack Damson)
  - Gimme Shelter (Tom Fitzpatrick)
  - Brothers (Farful)
- Ben Affleck
  - Chasing Amy (Holden McNeil)
  - Good Will Hunting (Chuckie Sullivan)
  - Dogma (Bartleby)
  - Reindeer Games (2002 TV Asahi edition) (Rudy Duncan)
  - Jay and Silent Bob Strike Back (Holden McNeil / Ben Affleck)
  - Pearl Harbor (Rafe McCawley)
  - The Sum of All Fears (Jack Ryan)
  - Runner Runner (Ivan Block)
  - The Last Duel (Count Pierre d'Alençon)
- Clive Owen
  - Sin City (Dwight McCarthy)
  - Children of Men (Theo Faron)
  - Duplicity (Ray Koval)
  - Intruders (John Farrow)
  - Shadow Dancer (Mac)
  - Last Knights (Raiden)
  - Impeachment: American Crime Story (Bill Clinton)
- Christian Slater
  - Young Guns II ("Arkansas" Dave Rudabaugh)
  - Kuffs (George Kuffs)
  - Interview with the Vampire (1998 Fuji TV edition) (Daniel Molloy)
  - Jimmy Hollywood (William)
  - Hard Rain (Tom)
  - Pursued (Vincent Palmer)
- 12 Angry Men (VHS edition) (Juror #10 (Mykelti Williamson))
- The A-Team (Templeton "Face" Peck (Bradley Cooper))
- The Adventures of Buckaroo Banzai Across the 8th Dimension (Reno Nevada (Pepe Serna))
- The Aftermath (Colonel Lewis Morgan (Jason Clarke))
- Alias (Michael Vaughn (Michael Vartan))
- American Graffiti (2011 Blu-Ray edition) (Curt Henderson (Richard Dreyfuss))
- Around the World in 80 Days (2008 TV Tokyo edition) (Phileas Fogg (Steve Coogan))
- Bad Company (Officer Seale (Gabriel Macht))
- Bad Girls (Josh McCoy (Dermot Mulroney))
- Ballerina (Charon (Lance Reddick))
- Before I Go to Sleep (Ben Lucas (Colin Firth))
- Begin Again (Dan Mulligan (Mark Ruffalo))
- A Better Tomorrow (2013 DVD/Blu-Ray edition) (Shing (Waise Lee))
- Beverly Hills, 90210 (Steve Sanders (Ian Ziering))
- BH90210 (Ian Ziering/Steve Sanders)
- Beverly Hills Cop III (Serge (Bronson Pinchot))
- Beyond Valkyrie: Dawn of the 4th Reich (Captain Evan Blackburn (Sean Patrick Flanery))
- Big (Josh Baskin (Tom Hanks))
- Blown Away (Anthony Franklin (Forest Whitaker))
- Boiling Point (Alastair Skye (Jason Flemyng))
- Breaking Bad (Gus Fring (Giancarlo Esposito))
- Buffy the Vampire Slayer (Angel (David Boreanaz))
- The Butler (2016 BS Japan edition) (Richard Nixon (John Cusack))
- Captain America (Steve Rogers / Captain America (Matt Salinger))
- C.B. Strike (Jeff Whittaker (Matt King))
- Christine (1990 TV Asahi edition) (Dennis Guilder (John Stockwell))
- Cohen and Tate (Tate (Adam Baldwin))
- Colossal (Oscar (Jason Sudeikis))
- Colt 45 (Milo Cardena (Joeystarr))
- Committed (Carl (Luke Wilson))
- Congo (Peter Elliott (Dylan Walsh))
- Cool Runnings (1998 NTV edition) (Sanka Coffie (Doug E. Doug))
- Cowboy Bebop (Gren (Mason Alexander Park))
- Dark Angel (Logan (Michael Weatherly))
- Dark City (John Murdoch (Rufus Sewell))
- Das Boot (2004 TV Tokyo edition) (Lieutenant Werner (Herbert Grönemeyer))
- Date Movie (Frank Jones (Eddie Griffin))
- Dead Poets Society (Charlie Dalton (Gale Hansen))
- Delivery Man (David Wozniak (Vince Vaughn))
- Desperado (1998 TV Asahi edition) (Buscemi (Steve Buscemi))
- Deuce Bigalow: Male Gigolo (Deuce Bigalow (Rob Schneider))
- The Devil's Advocate (Kevin Lomax (Keanu Reeves))
- Django (Django (Matthias Schoenaerts))
- Domino (Ian Ziering)
- Doom (John "Reaper" Grimm (Karl Urban))
- Dragonheart: A New Beginning (Lord Osric of Crossley)
- Dream Scenario (Richard (Dylan Baker))
- Ed (Kirby (Patrick Kerr))
- Edward Scissorhands (Jim (Anthony Michael Hall))
- El tiempo entre costuras (Manuel Da Silva (Filipe Duarte))
- Elementary (Captain Thomas Gregson (Aidan Quinn))
- Endless Love (Hugh Butterfield (Bruce Greenwood))
- Emergency Declaration (Gu In-ho (Song Kang-ho))
- Enemy at the Gates (Commissar Danilov (Joseph Fiennes))
- Enough (Mitch Hiller (Billy Campbell))
- Event 15 (Andrews (James Frain))
- Everest (Beck Weathers (Josh Brolin))
- Evolution (2005 NTV edition) (Colonel Dr. Ira Kane (David Duchovny))
- Extinction (Jack (Jeffrey Donovan))
- Fair Game (Max Kirkpatrick (William Baldwin))
- The Fast and the Furious (2005 TV Asahi edition) (Brian O'Conner (Paul Walker))
- 2 Fast 2 Furious (2006 TV Asahi edition) (Brian O'Conner (Paul Walker))
- The Fly II (Martin Brundle (Eric Stoltz))
- The Four III (Prince (Waise Lee))
- From the Earth to the Moon (Alan Bean (Dave Foley))
- From Vegas to Macau (Mr. Ko (Gao Hu))
- Full House (Jesse Katsopolis (John Stamos))
- Fuller House (Jesse Katsopolis (John Stamos))
- Funny Games (George Farber (Tim Roth))
- Gandhi (Vince Walker (Martin Sheen))
- Ghost (1999 TV Asahi edition) (Sam Wheat (Patrick Swayze))
- Godzilla (Victor "Animal" Palotti (Hank Azaria))
- The Gift (Buddy Cole (Giovanni Ribisi))
- The Good, the Bad, the Weird (Yoon Tae-goo (Song Kang-ho))
- Halloween II (1988 NTV edition) (Jimmy (Lance Guest))
- Hard Candy (Jeff Kohlver (Patrick Wilson))
- Hart's War (Thomas Hart (Colin Farrell))
- High Fidelity (Rob Gordon (John Cusack))
- The Hitchhiker's Guide to the Galaxy (Eddie the Computer (Thomas Lennon))
- House of the Dragon (King Viserys I Targaryen (Paddy Considine))
- I Heart Huckabees (Brad Stand (Jude Law))
- Identity (2007 TV Tokyo edition) (Edward Dakota (John Cusack))
- If I Stay (Dennis "Denny" Hall (Joshua Leonard))
- In & Out (Cameron Drake (Matt Dillon))
- Insidious: Chapter 3 (Sean Brenner (Dermot Mulroney))
- Island of Fire (Wang Wei (Tony Leung Chiu-wai))
- Jaws (2005 DVD edition) (Matt Hooper (Richard Dreyfuss))
- Jaws 2 (2022 BS Tokyo edition) (Deputy Jeff Hendricks (Jeffrey Kramer))
- A Jitney Elopement (2014 Star Channel edition) (Suitor (Charlie Chaplin))
- Joe Dirt 2: Beautiful Loser (Joe Dirt (David Spade))
- John Wick (Viggo Tarasov (Michael Nyqvist))
- John Wick: Chapter 2 (Charon (Lance Reddick))
- John Wick: Chapter 3 – Parabellum (Charon (Lance Reddick))
- John Wick: Chapter 4 (Charon (Lance Reddick))
- Jurassic World (2017 NTV edition) (Dr. Henry Wu (BD Wong))
- Keeping Up with the Joneses (Tim Jones (Jon Hamm))
- The King's Speech (King George VI (Colin Firth))
- Kraven the Hunter (Aleksei Sytsevich / Rhino (Alessandro Nivola))
- L.A. Law (Victor Sifuentes (Jimmy Smits))
- Land of the Lost (Will Stanton (Danny McBride))
- Line Walker 2: Invisible Spy (CIB Superintendent Yip (Francis Ng))
- Lola Versus (Lenny (Bill Pullman))
- Marmaduke (Marmaduke (Owen Wilson))
- The Messengers (Roy Solomon (Dylan McDermott))
- The Midnight After (Fat (Simon Yam))
- Midnight Sun (Jack Price (Rob Riggle))
- Minority Report (John Anderton (Tom Cruise))
- Mission: Impossible (1999 Fuji TV edition) (Jack Harmon (Emilio Estevez))
- The Mist (David Drayton (Thomas Jane))
- A Moment to Remember (Seo Yeong-min)
- Mrs. Doubtfire (1997 TV Asahi edition) (Stuart Dunmeyer (Pierce Brosnan))
- Muppet Treasure Island (Clueless Morgan)
- My Best Friend's Wedding (George Downes (Rupert Everett))
- North Face (2020 BS Tokyo edition) (Henry Arau (Ulrich Tukur))
- Nothing to Lose (Terrance Paul "T. Paul" Davidson (Martin Lawrence))
- Nowhere in Africa (Walter Redlich (Merab Ninidze))
- Oldboy (Park Cheol-woong (Oh Dal-su))
- Once Upon a Time in China II (Leung Foon (Max Mok))
- Once Upon a Time in China III (Leung Foon (Max Mok))
- Only You (Peter Wright (Robert Downey Jr.))
- Out of Africa (Baron Bror von Blixen & Baron Hans von Blixen (Klaus Maria Brandauer))
- Out of Sight (2002 NTV edition) (Maurice Miller (Don Cheadle))
- Outcast (Reverend Anderson (Philip Glenister))
- The Pawnshop (2014 Star Channel edition) (Pawnshop Assistant (Charlie Chaplin))
- Phenomenon (Nate Pope (Forest Whitaker))
- Playing by Heart (Trent (Jon Stewart))
- Point Break (Johnny Utah (Keanu Reeves))
- Point of No Return (J.P. (Dermot Mulroney))
- Police Story 2013 (Wu Jiang (Liu Ye))
- Possession (Roman (Lee Pace))
- Psycho (Sam Loomis (Viggo Mortensen))
- Purple Noon (2008 TV Tokyo edition) (Inspector Riccordi (Erno Crisa))
- The Quiet Man (2017 Star Channel edition) (Sean Thornton (John Wayne))
- Rambo: Last Blood (2022 BS Tokyo edition) (Hugo Martinez (Sergio Peris-Mencheta))
- Real Steel (Finn (Anthony Mackie))
- Rebound (Roy McCormick / Don McCormack (Martin Lawrence))
- Red Dwarf (Dave Lister (Craig Charles))
- The Resident (Randolph Bell (Bruce Greenwood))
- Resident Evil: Welcome to Raccoon City (Brian Irons (Donal Logue))
- Return to the 36th Chamber (Chu Jen-chieh (Gordon Liu))
- Roman Holiday (N.E.M. edition) (Joe Bradley (Gregory Peck))
- The Rookie (John Nolan (Nathan Fillion))
- Rumble in the Bronx (2009 TV Tokyo edition) (Tony (Marc Akerstream))
- Running Wild with Bear Grylls (Rob Riggle)
- Sanctum (Carl Hurley (Ioan Gruffudd))
- Saving Private Ryan (Private Daniel Jackson (Barry Pepper))
- Secretariat (John Tweedy (Dylan Walsh))
- Seinfeld (Jerry Seinfeld (Jerry Seinfeld))
- Seven Years in Tibet (Ngawang Jigme (BD Wong))
- Shanghai Knights (Wu Chow (Donnie Yen))
- Sin City: A Dame to Kill For (Dwight McCarthy (Josh Brolin))
- Six Days, Seven Nights (Frank Martin (David Schwimmer))
- Skiptrace (Connor Watts (Johnny Knoxville))
- Soul Surfer (Tom Hamilton (Dennis Quaid))
- A Sound of Thunder (Travis Ryer (Edward Burns))
- Species (Dan Smithson (Forest Whitaker))
- The Spy Next Door (Anton Poldark (Magnús Scheving))
- Star Wars Episode IV: A New Hope (2002 NTV edition) (Han Solo (Harrison Ford))
- Stealing Home (Young Alan Appleby (Jonathan Silverman))
- Stranger Within (Robert (William Baldwin))
- Stuck on You (Walter "Walt" Tenor (Greg Kinnear))
- Summer of Sam (Vinny (John Leguizamo))
- Survivor (Sam Parker (Dylan McDermott))
- Tai Chi 0 (Chen Chang Xing (Tony Leung Chiu-wai))
- Tai Chi Hero (Chen Chang Xing (Tony Leung Chiu-wai))
- The Taking of Tiger Mountain (Hawk (Tony Leung Chiu-wai))
- Team America: World Police (Joe)
- The Texas Chainsaw Massacre 2 (Rick (Chris Douridas))
- The Three Musketeers (Athos (Kiefer Sutherland))
- The Tiger and the Snow (Attilio de Giovanni (Roberto Benigni))
- Touching the Void (Simon Yates)
- The Truman Show (Truman Burbank (Jim Carrey))
- Trust the Man (Tom (David Duchovny))
- Twin Dragons (Tarzan (Teddy Robin))
- Twinkle, Twinkle, Lucky Stars (Associate of Muscles (Andy Lau))
- U.S. Marshals (John Royce (Robert Downey Jr.))
- The Vanishing (Jeff Harriman (Kiefer Sutherland))
- Virus (2002 NTV edition) (Steve Baker (William Baldwin))
- Wall Street (1992 TV Asahi edition) (Roger Barnes (James Spader))
- Wayne's World (Garth Algar (Dana Carvey))
- Wayne's World 2 (Garth Algar (Dana Carvey))
- The Wedding Singer (Robbie Hart (Adam Sandler))
- Welcome to Marwen (Mark Hogancamp / Cap'n Hogie (Steve Carell))
- Will & Grace (Will Truman (Eric McCormack))
- Winning Time: The Rise of the Lakers Dynasty (Jerry Buss (John C. Reilly))
- Woman on Top (Cliff Lloyd (Mark Feuerstein))
- Wonder Woman 1984 (Maxwell Lord (Pedro Pascal))
- The Young Master (Tiger (Wei Pai))

=== Animation ===
- An Extremely Goofy Movie (Bradley Uppercrust III)
- The Bears' Famous Invasion of Sicily (Leonzio)
- Buzz Lightyear of Star Command (XR)
- The Cuphead Show! (The Devil)
- Early Man (Message Bird)
- The Emperor's New Groove (Kronk)
- Kronk's New Groove (Kronk)
- Minions: The Rise of Gru (Silas Ramsbottom)
- Secret of the Wings (Lord Milori)
- The Summit of the Gods (Makoto Fukamachi)
- Teenage Mutant Ninja Turtles: Mutant Mayhem (Splinter)

=== Video games ===
- Spider-Man 2 (Norman Osborn)

=== Other voices ===
- Star Tours – The Adventures Continue at Tokyo Disneyland – G2-4T
