= Quinton Flynn =

American voice actor (born 1964)

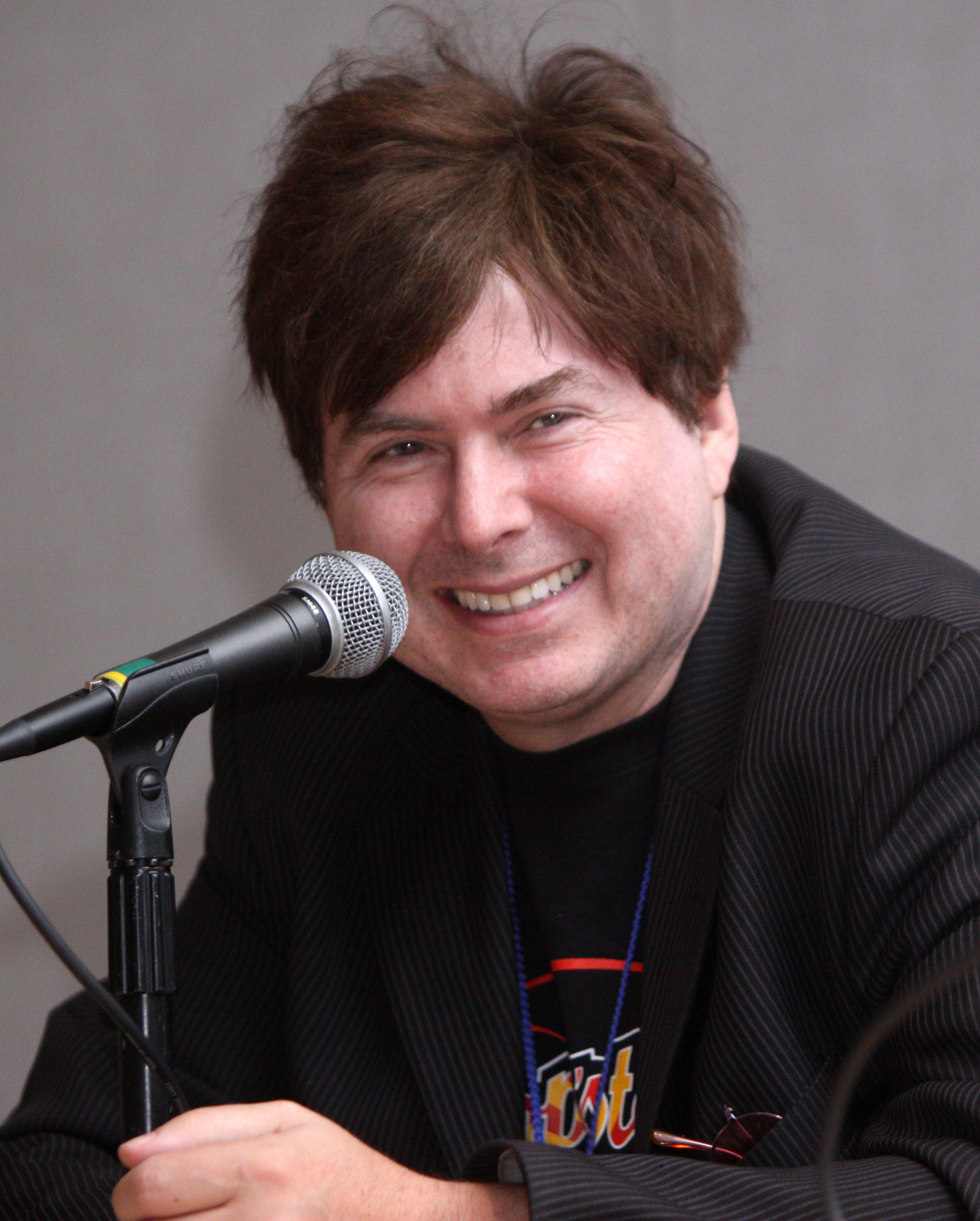
- Flynn at the Phoenix Comicon in 2012
- Born: October 10, 1964 (age 62); Cleveland, Ohio, U.S.
- Education: Bowling Green State University, Kent State University
- Occupations: Voice actor; comedian
- Years active: 1992–present

Quinton Flynn (born October 10, 1964) is an American voice actor and comedian, who has provided the English voices of video game characters such as Raiden in the Metal Gear series, Marcus Damon in Digimon Data Squad, and Axel and his original self Lea in the Kingdom Hearts series.

== Early life ==
Quinton Flynn was born in Cleveland, Ohio. He is a graduate of the Bowling Green State University and Kent State University.

== Career ==
Flynn began his career in 1992. His first acting credit was the character Jonathan Willis Internal Monologue in the television film Jonathan: The Boy Nobody Wanted. He also worked in sketch comedy, such as portraying Paul McCartney on Jimmy Kimmel Live!. He reprised the role again in the comedy film My Dinner with Jimi.

As a voice actor, he has provided many character voices in animated films, television shows, anime and video games. He is a frequently recurring actor in the Crash Bandicoot video game series. He later became the voice of Silver the Hedgehog in the Sonic the Hedgehog series starting in 2010, he continued to voice the character for seven more years up until 2017 when he was replaced by Bryce Papenbrook.

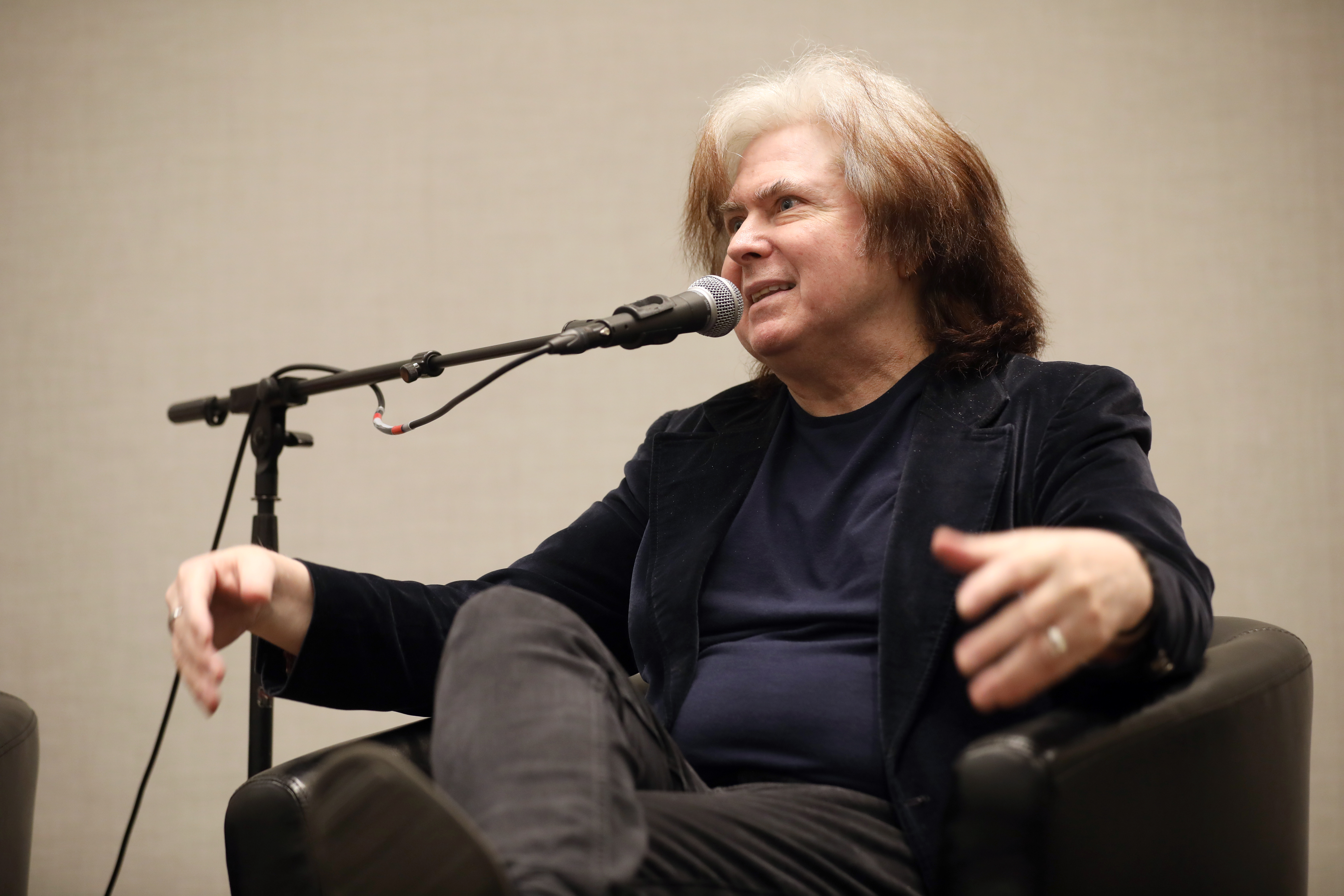
Flynn in 2024

Flynn also provided the voice of Reno in Final Fantasy VII and its sequels and prequels, and Henry in No More Heroes. He is also best known for providing the voices of Raiden in the Metal Gear video game series and Axel in the Kingdom Hearts series. He played the role of Kael'thas Sunstrider in Warcraft III: The Frozen Throne and World of Warcraft; his lines in the latter were replaced in 2021.

In television, he voiced Timon in Disney's Timon & Pumbaa, replacing Nathan Lane after he voiced the character for 10 episodes. Flynn also provided the voice of Mickey Mouse in the Mickey Mouse Works episode "Minnie Takes Care of Pluto".

Additionally, he voiced many other characters in All Grown Up!, The Angry Beavers, As Told by Ginger, Avatar: The Last Airbender, The Avengers: Earth's Mightiest Heroes, Cow and Chicken, Dave the Barbarian, Fantastic Four, Freakazoid!, Generator Rex, The Grim Adventures of Billy & Mandy, Johnny Bravo, Mad, My Life as a Teenage Robot, The Real Adventures of Jonny Quest, Robot Chicken, Samurai Jack, Scooby-Doo! Mystery Incorporated, Spider-Man, Stuart Little, and Teen Titans.

In anime, he voiced Iruka Umino in Naruto, Naruto: Shippuden and The Last: Naruto the Movie. He also voiced characters such as Shingo Shoji for the Tokyopop dub of the Initial D series, Marcus Damon in Digimon Data Squad, Reno in Final Fantasy VII Advent Children, Raiden in the English dub of Metal Gear Solid 2: Bande Dessinee, Carl and McCoy in Blood+, Kon in the Bleach series, and Dr. Riddles in Zatch Bell!.

== Filmography ==
=== Animation ===
- All Grown Up! – Kid #3, Funny Hair Man (Ep. 9)
- Animaniacs – Joey, Ross
- The Angry Beavers – Rusty, Singer
- As Told by Ginger – George Magrority
- Avatar: The Last Airbender – Tycho (Ep. 35)
- The Avengers: Earth's Mightiest Heroes – Malekith the Accursed
- Cow and Chicken – Beaver #1, Man
- Dave the Barbarian – King, Cute Backstreet Minstrel
- Fantastic Four – Human Torch/Johnny Storm (season 2)
- Freakazoid! – Elliot (Ep. "Nerdator")
- Generator Rex – Beau (Ep. "Rock My World"; uncredited)
- The Grim Adventures of Billy & Mandy – Harvey, Bailiff, Dr. Gaylord
- Johnny Bravo – Boy #1
- Mad – Jack Harper, Captain Thomas Gregson, MADitorial Announcer (Ep. "POblivion/Umbrellamentary")
- Mickey Mouse Works – Mickey Mouse
- My Life as a Teenage Robot – Sheldon Lee, Don Prima, additional voices
- The Real Adventures of Jonny Quest – Jonny Quest (season 2),
- Robot Chicken – Elmer Fudd, Swiper the Fox, Sir Topham Hatt, additional voices
- Samurai Jack – Monk A
- Scooby-Doo! Mystery Incorporated – Additional voices (2 episodes)
- Seal Team - Shark
- Spider-Man: The Animated Series – Human Torch/Johnny Storm
- Stuart Little – Snowbell (13 episodes, replacing Nathan Lane)
- Teen Titans – Lightning
- Timon & Pumbaa – Timon (24 episodes)
- Totally Spies! – Rick
- Xyber 9: New Dawn – Mick

=== Anime ===
- Initial D series – Shingo Shoji (Tokyopop dub)
- Digimon Data Squad – Marcus Damon
- Final Fantasy VII Advent Children – Reno
- Metal Gear Solid 2: Bande Dessinee – Raiden (English voice)
- Naruto – Iruka Umino
- Naruto: Shippuden – Iruka Umino
- Blood+ – Carl, McCoy
- Bleach – Kon
- The Last: Naruto the Movie – Iruka Umino, Messenger
- Zatch Bell! – Dr. Riddles

=== Film ===
- Bilal: A New Breed of Hero – Additional voices
- Globehunters: An Around The World in Eighty Days Adventure – Dr. Wilkins, Spume
- Immigrants – Hermaphrodite, Businessman
- The Jungle Book: Mowgli's Story – Bad Baboon, Wolf #3
- Ultimate Avengers – Additional voices

=== Video games ===
- Command & Conquer: Renegade – Additional Voices
- Command & Conquer: Generals – Additional Voices
- Arc the Lad: Twilight of the Spirits – Kharg (English version)
- Armored Core 4 – Sir Maurescu, Base Defense Force (English version)
- Call of Duty: United Offensive – Private Ender
- Cartoon Network: Punch Time Explosion – Billy (3DS version only), Toiletnator (XL version only)
- Crash Bandicoot series
  - Nitro Kart – Doctor N. Gin, Nitros Oxide
  - Tag Team Racing – Chick Gizzard Lips
  - Twinsanity – The Evil Twins (Victor and Moritz), Doctor N. Gin, Penguin, Skunk
- Crisis Core: Final Fantasy VII – Reno (English version)
- Curse of Monkey Island – Mr. Fossey
- Digimon World Data Squad – Marcus Damon (English version)
- Final Fantasy X – Isaaru
- Final Fantasy X-2 – Isaaru
- Gurumin: A Monstrous Adventure – Roger, Poco (English version)
- Hearthstone – Kael'thas Sunstrider (Lines replaced)
- Heroes of the Storm – Kael'thas Sunstrider
- Kingdom Hearts series – Axel (English voice)
  - Kingdom Hearts II
  - Kingdom Hearts Re:Chain of Memories
  - Kingdom Hearts 358/2 Days
  - Kingdom Hearts Birth by Sleep – Lea
  - Kingdom Hearts 3D: Dream Drop Distance – Lea (English voice)
  - 1.5 Remix (archived and new footage)
  - 2.5 Remix – Axel/Lea (English voice) (archived and new footage)
  - 2.8 Final Chapter Prologue – Axel/Lea (English voice) (archived footage)
  - Kingdom Hearts III – Axel/Lea (English voice)
- La Pucelle: Tactics – Croix (English version)
- League of Legends - Jhin
- The Lord of the Rings: The Fellowship of the Ring: The Video Game – Merry, Gollum
- Madagascar: The Video Game – Big Mouth Parrot, Delivery Truck Driver, Sailor #1, Lemur #2
- Marvel: Ultimate Alliance – Spider-Man/Peter Parker
- Mass Effect 2 - Kolyat Krios
- Metal Gear Solid series – Raiden (English version)
  - Sons of Liberty
  - Portable Ops – Fox Soldier B
  - Guns of the Patriots
  - Revengeance
- Minority Report: Everybody Runs – Danny Witwer, Rufus T. Riley, additional voices
- Naruto Shippuden: Ultimate Ninja Impact – Iruka Umino (English version)
- Naruto Shippuden: Ultimate Ninja Storm 3 – Iruka Umino (English version)
- Naruto Shippuden: Ultimate Ninja Storm Generations – Iruka Umino (English version)
- No More Heroes – Henry Cooldown (English version)
- No More Heroes 2: Desperate Struggle – Henry Cooldown (English version)
- Onimusha: Blade Warriors – Kotaro Fuma (English version)
- Orphen: Scion of Sorcery – Orphen (English version)
- Pirates of the Caribbean: The Legend of Jack Sparrow – Lucky, Ice Viking King, Magistrate of Nassau, Port Royal Civilian
- PlayStation All-Stars Battle Royale – Raiden
- Rogue Galaxy – Monsha, Toady, Ugozl lo Burkaqua (English version)
- Shark Tale – Middle-age Man Fish, News-truck Fish
- Shadow of Rome – Askari, additional voices (English version)
- Sonic the Hedgehog series – Silver the Hedgehog (2010–2019, replaces Pete Capella) (English version)
  - Colors (DS version only; credited as Derek Allen)
  - Forces - Eagle Squad Soldier
  - Free Riders
  - Generations
  - Mario & Sonic series:
    - London 2012 Olympic Games
    - Sochi 2014 Winter Olympic Games
    - Rio 2016 Olympic Games
- Skylanders: Trap Team – Dr. Krankcase (English Voice)
- Skylanders: Superchargers – Dr. Krankcase (English Voice)
- Skylanders: Imaginators – Dr. Krankcase (English Voice)
- Spider-Man: Friend or Foe – Venom
- The Bard's Tale – Additional voices
- The Saboteur – Additional voices
- The X-Fools: The Spoof is Out There - Gangley
- True Crime: New York City – Additional voices
- Warcraft 3: The Frozen Throne – Kael'thas Sunstrider
- Warcraft 3: Reforged – Kael'thas Sunstrider
- World of Warcraft: The Burning Crusade – Kael'thas Sunstrider, High Botanist Freywinn (Line replaced)
- World of Warcraft: Shadowlands – Kael'thas Sunstrider (Lines replaced)
- The Wonderful 101 – Prince Vorkken (English voice)
- X-Men Legends II: Rise of Apocalypse – Banshee, Abyss

=== Live-action ===
- Against the Sun – Newsreel Narrator
- A Hard Day's Day – Paul McCartney
- Eyewitness – Joe
- I'd Kill for You – Narrator (voice)
- Jimmy Kimmel Live! – Paul McCartney
- Jonathan: The Boy Nobody Wanted – Jonathan Willis
- Leap of Faith – Man from Bar
- Men Behaving Badly – Bill Clinton
- My Dinner With Jimi – Paul McCartney
- The Christopher Walken Ecstatic Dance Academy – Christopher Walken
- The Mystery of Natalie Wood – James Dean V.O. (voice)
- WTF: World Thumbwrestling Federation – Nilsson Ovërgartten

== Discography ==
Puzzled Yesterdays EP - 2011:

• 1: Miss Right (2:43)

• 2: Puzzled Yesterdays (2:59)

• 3: Billy (4:08)
