= Raiden (Metal Gear) =

Fictional character from the Metal Gear series

- Metal Gear character
- Raiden as depicted in Metal Gear Rising: Revengeance (2013)
- First appearance: Metal Gear Solid 2: Sons of Liberty (2001)
- Created by: Hideo Kojima
- Designed by: Yoji Shinkawa
- Voiced by: Quinton Flynn; Charlie Schlatter (MGS3 Secret Theater); Kenyu Horiuchi (Japanese)
- Motion capture: Eiji Morisaki (MGS2); Takeshi Yoshioka (MGS4)

In-universe information
- Nickname: Jack the Ripper
- Nationality: Liberian-American

Raiden (Note: Japanese: 雷電), real name Jack (Note: Japanese: ジャック, Hepburn: Jakku), is a fictional character and one of the protagonists of Konami's Metal Gear series. Created by Hideo Kojima and designed by Yoji Shinkawa, Raiden was introduced in the series as the main player character of the 2001 game Metal Gear Solid 2: Sons of Liberty. In Metal Gear Solid 2, he appears to be a member of the U.S. special operations unit FOXHOUND and is participating in his first mission against terrorists. Despite coming across as a young rookie, he is later revealed to have been a child soldier in his native Liberia, having earned the nickname "Jack the Ripper" (Note: Japanese: ジャック・ザ・リッパー, Hepburn: Jakku za Rippā). Raiden also appears as a supporting character in the 2008 game Metal Gear Solid 4: Guns of the Patriots, in which he is assisting the series' main protagonist Solid Snake in his fight against Revolver Ocelot's forces. He is also the main character of the 2013 game Metal Gear Rising: Revengeance, in which he is dealing with his past and his present life as a combatant who faces enemies from private military companies.

Raiden, who was inspired by the Sherlock Holmes stories and a fan's letter wanting a younger character to be featured in the series, originated from Kojima's desire to see Snake from a different point of view. His inclusion in Metal Gear Solid 2 was kept secret from gamers before his debut; despite some players' reactions, the staff liked the character. To appeal to fans of the series who initially disliked him, the character was redesigned for Metal Gear Solid 4. He was again redesigned for both the cancelled game Metal Gear Solid: Rising and its reboot Revengeance to portray a darker side of his character. Raiden is voiced by Kenyu Horiuchi in Japanese and Quinton Flynn in English.

Raiden's debut role as the protagonist of Metal Gear Solid 2 was controversial, due to his unexpected substitution for the established hero Snake. Some critics defended the character, stating that fans were merely angered by Snake's removal and that Raiden was appealing. Despite the initial mixed reception, Raiden has been praised for his role in the game, as well as his later Metal Gear Solid 4 redesign and more for his role and design in Metal Gear Rising: Revengeance.

== Character design ==
=== Initial concept ===
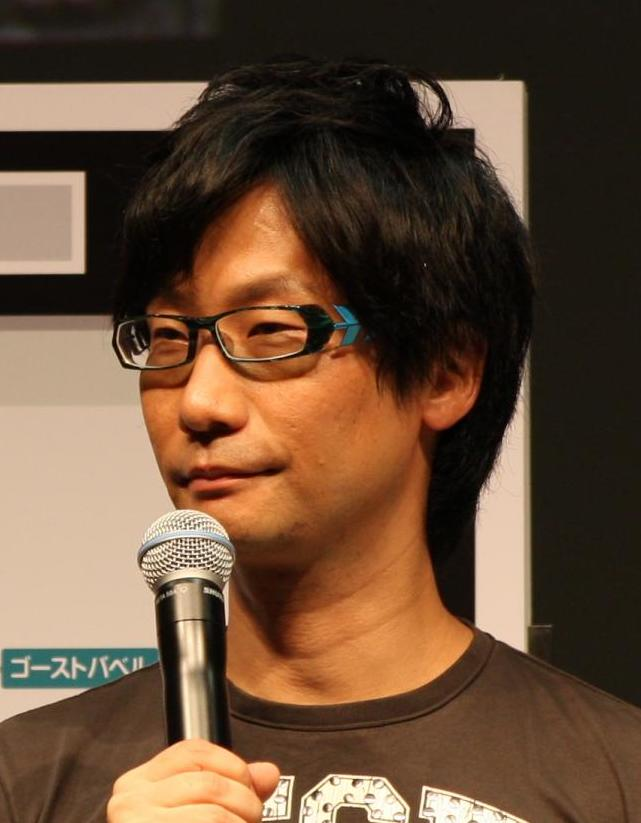
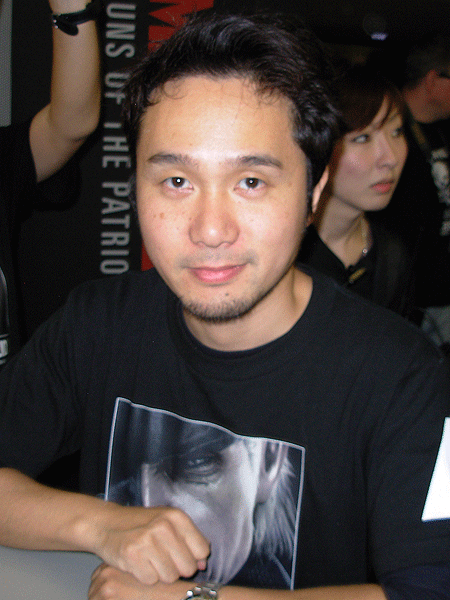
Hideo Kojima created Raiden while Yoji Shinkawa designed him.

According to series creator Hideo Kojima, the decision to make a new character to replace Solid Snake for most of Metal Gear Solid 2: Sons of Liberty stemmed from the developer's desire to develop Snake from a third-person perspective. Kojima stated that Raiden's character and his perception by the audience were important to the overall feel of the story. The idea of having a second main character was inspired by the Sherlock Holmes short stories and novels in which the narrator is Dr. Watson rather than Holmes. Kojima said that while Raiden was the playable character, Snake was still the game's true protagonist rather than Raiden. Yoshikazu Matsuhana, assistant director for the project, was uncertain about this decision; he considered Raiden a "weak-looking character" but decided to follow Kojima. The codename "Raiden" was based on that of the Mitsubishi J2M Raiden, a historical combat aircraft of the Imperial Japanese Navy Air Service. It was initially planned to be written in katakana as "ライデン", but was changed to the kanji form "雷電" because of a resemblance to Bin Laden's "Laden" in katakana, "ラーディン". His full name was going to be "Raiden Brannigan" but the idea was scrapped. The romantic relationship between Raiden and Rosemary was inspired by Kojima's experiences; their names, Jack and Rose, are a reference to Leonardo DiCaprio and Kate Winslet's lead characters in the film Titanic. In Metal Gear Solid 2, Raiden is considered to be a representation of the player through the experiences between the player and the character during the game.

Raiden as he appeared in Metal Gear Solid 2

Kojima conducted a survey among Japanese women about their views on certain video games. One respondent stated that she was tired of the main characters being "old men". Kojima took her complaint into consideration, and Raiden was designed by artist Yoji Shinkawa to be more appealing to the preferences of Japanese women. Some Western gamers thought Raiden had an effeminate appearance, however Shinkawa said this perception is wrong, and that Raiden's appearance is that of a handsome young man. Raiden's outfit—the Skull Suit—was difficult to design until the staff decided on a "bonelike" concept. Shinkawa wanted to make Raiden sexually appealing, emphasizing the tightness of his clothing. The design of Raiden's underwater rebreather mask was inspired by ancient mystical ninjutsu, where the ninja bites a scroll in the mouth during magic transformations. Raiden's final duel with the boss Solidus Snake was revised in the making of the game. Originally, to defeat Solidus, Raiden must cut off both his mechanical snake-like arms, then he must attack Solidus' back and sever the backbone vertebra connection, rendering Solidus no longer mobile. Following this, Raiden would finish Solidus by decapitating him similar to samurai fashion. The scene was rejected and instead, Raiden would slice Solidus' stomach, another idea taken from samurai. However, this concept was also scrapped to simply Raiden slicing Solidus' vertebral column with the boss falling from the area to give the idea he could not accept his defeat.

Konami kept Raiden's starring role in Metal Gear Solid 2 secret until the game's North American release; the company replaced Raiden with Snake in teaser trailers and other preview materials. Although Raiden appeared in several preview trailers in his scuba gear, his presence was not emphasized. The surprise to fans that Raiden was not Snake was admitted by Kojima to have been inspired by the plot twist of Terminator 2: Judgment Day where the titular character played by Arnold Schwarzenegger was not a villain in that movie. Raiden's appearance in the game was announced to the Japanese press on the day of the game's release in North America. Kojima said that Raiden was not supposed to be the focus of the storyline, even if he was the main character, and that he "didn't do a good enough job of conveying that" to the player.

=== Further development ===
Raiden's new design for Metal Gear Solid 4 was a response to the criticism that only his face remained in his cybernetic body. Shinkawa was surprised by the way he illustrated Raiden. The staff noted that Raiden's debut in the game's trailer received notably positive responses; several video-game magazines promoted the game with Raiden's screenshots. Shinkawa and Kojima initially wanted to reincarnate Gray Fox for Metal Gear Solid 4, but scrapped him for Raiden, who they "adored" and wanted to expand with another game. In designing him, Shinkawa wanted to convey both Raiden's beauty and sorrow in his cybernetic body. He was given the ability to wield swords with his own legs, giving the players the impression he was a ninja. Raiden's first fight against Vamp in the game caused motion and voice actors difficulty because of carefully planned movements performed by the two fighters. The staff was satisfied with the outcome, considering it one of the best battles in the game. Two actors were selected for the motion capture of Raiden; one did most of his appearances while another did his action sequences. Raiden's fights in Guns of the Patriots were made to assist the weaker Solid Snake and appealed to previous fans of the series who disliked the character. Because Raiden became a more active character in Guns of the Patriots, Kojima expressed a desire in him returning in a future character as playable.

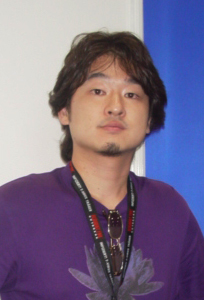
Atsushi Inaba from Platinum Games oversaw Raiden's character in Rising.

When Metal Gear Rising: Revengeance was known as Metal Gear Solid: Rising, former producer Shigenobu Matsuyama hinted that Raiden's past as a child soldier would be elaborated upon and his weaknesses as a human would be explored. Matsuyama wanted Raiden to have as strong a role in the game as in Metal Gear Solid 2, leading him to become its main character. Director Mineshi Kimura wanted Raiden to be able to move the way he did in the Metal Gear Solid 4 trailers, wanting to show "the stealth of the sword, and the strength of not even losing to the gun, and the fear and power you have with this blade". Matsuyama said they would focus on Raiden's strong will and physical strength so he would be enjoyable to control. Raiden's design was changed during the game's development, leading to different promotional images of him. Following the game's reboot into a spin-off, developers stated that while Raiden "has grown up" in comparison to previous Metal Gear games, he is still conflicted with his life as a child soldier in the First Liberian Civil War, leading him to become a "hero with a dark past". Shinkawa later discussed with Platinum Games' Kenji Saito about including his quasi-human look. Raiden's loss of an eye also represents his transformation across the story while also comparing him with the previous antagonist Solidus Snake. Tamari also explained that the cybernetic functions Raiden has were based on research led by the University of Texas. In response to complaints that Rising appeared to contradict Raiden's ending in Guns of the Patriots, the Kojima Productions staff said the game would explain what happened with Raiden's life. While Steven Armstrong was the game's final antagonist, the character of Jetstream Sam was developed to be Raiden's rival, something Shinkawa and fellow designer Kenichirou Yoshimura worked together to make both of them contrast each other through their visual appearances.

The team in charge of Revengeance depicted Raiden as a more mature character than in his previous appearances; they said his swordplay is not based on any samurai and that Raiden's cybernetic body includes heels because they enable his style of swordplay, where he wields weapons with his feet. When developing the game's, the team thought of Raiden's revenge against his enemies, which resulted in the title "Reveangeance". Writer Etsu Tamari expressed joy in the final product and expected that in the future, the team could make another game focused on Raiden. In a further analysis of how to write Raiden in Revengeance, Tamari stated he needed a new character that would bring him support in the form of the dog-like robot named Bladewolf; similar to how Snake guides Raiden in Sons of Liberty, the mature Raiden acts like a mentor to Bladewolf across the story resulting in his character arc. Writer Etsu Tamari wanted to portray Raiden as a more mature person who wishes to take Snake's footsteps. Atsushi Inaba wanted the gameplay of Revengeance fit Raiden's style of characterization, resulting in the use of parries rather than defense. Inaba felt honored to work in Revengeance due to how he was able to see a more mature version of the character to the point of wishing for a sequel.

Raiden wears a "Skull Suit" (スカルスーツ, Sukaru Sūtsu) for his missions in Metal Gear Solid 2: Sons of Liberty. This suit monitors Raiden's biological functions and relays this information to the Sons of Liberty. In Metal Gear Solid 4: Guns of the Patriots Raiden's entire body below the upper jaw is replaced with a prototype cybernetic body. His original cybernetic body is replaced with a black one that also covers the left eye for Revengeance. Although proficient at all types of weaponry, Raiden specializes in wielding swords that resonate at high frequencies for the last fights in Sons of Liberty, and during Guns of the Patriots and Revengeance.

=== Personality ===
In his first appearance, Raiden is a rookie agent who is inexperienced as a result of training only in virtual reality. He later reveals, however, that he was a child soldier known as "Jack the Ripper" (ジャック・ザ・リッパー, Jakku Za Rippā) who killed several enemies in a civil war and is ashamed of his past. This affects Raiden's personality; he begins to believe he is only useful on the battlefield and his relationship with his girlfriend Rosemary would not work. Manipulation by the Patriots causes him to believe he has no free will. Solid Snake encourages Raiden to ignore what people tell him and to become self-reliant when problem-solving.

Kojima Productions compared the experiences and ways of thinking of Raiden and Solid Snake. During the game's climax, Raiden stays handcuffed until his final fight against Solidus Snake; Snake escapes from his handcuffs to follow Revolver Ocelot, emphasizing Raiden's lack of freedom. Hideo Kojima compared Raiden and Snake with movie monsters King Kong and Godzilla, respectively; the former was taken from his home and his nature changes upon meeting Rosemary, whereas the latter will continue fighting against mankind's menaces. Defeating Solidus, Snake encourages Raiden to trust himself and believe in his own choices. This is further addressed by the staff's motivation to make a new sequel to Metal Gear without Kojima. Kojima also likened Raiden with John Rambo from the Rambo series because both characters always find themselves taking part in battles despite their desire for a peaceful resolution. Raiden himself believes that he is destined to fight based on his upbringing during Revengeance while also following the concept of katsujinken in which samurai kill in order to protect the weak.

=== Portrayal ===
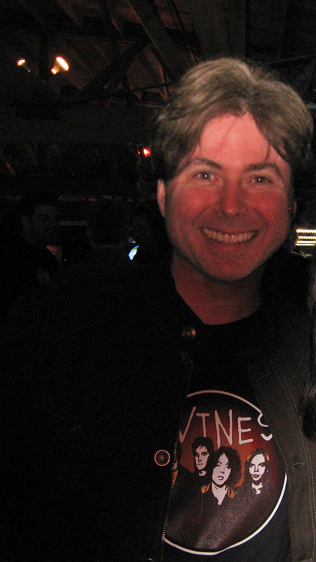
Quinton Flynn has enjoyed doing the English voice for Raiden.

In the Japanese versions of the games, Raiden has been voiced by Kenyu Horiuchi, who first saw him as an attractive young man whose actions in Son of Liberty were challenging for his identity. Horiuchi was impressed by the characterization shown across the game, believing him to fit with other members featured in the game. Kojima liked Horiuchi's work, believing Raiden became popular in Japan in part because of his performance, something which he felt the character lacked in Western regions. could understand the character's pain; despite becoming a cyborg, Raiden still acts like a human. Horiuchi took a liking to Raiden's spin-off game, Revengeance, as he acted as the lead for the first time but was still glad that he got meet new actors who appeared in the game, most notably the actor behind Doktor. The actors also liked the inclusion of Raiden's sidekick, LQ-84i (later renamed Bladewolf), as they believe that ninjas like Raiden are obligated to have dogs as allies. Another relationship the actors liked was Raiden's exchanges with Courtney due to few female characters being present in the game but felt they made the characters get along properly. Horiuchi felt confident in being in doing Raiden's voice as the lead, believing his thirty years of experience made him suitable for the role.

Casting director Kris Zimmerman chose Quinton Flynn, with whom she had previously worked, to voice Raiden in the series' English adaptation. Flynn remembers having a long time to develop the character and being instructed by Zimmerman to use an older voice from a character he previously voiced. Flynn said Raiden was one of his favorite video-game voice characters and noted a difference between his roles in Metal Gear Solid 2 and Metal Gear Solid 4; Flynn was surprised by fans' response to the character but said it attracted new fans to the series. Flynn thought fans were angry at the idea that Raiden would replace Snake for all subsequent games. In promoting Revengeance, Raiden's design by Shinkawa was used in presence in London, Leeds and Liverpool during 2013. However, he was pleased with working alongside David Hayter whom he often interacted while recording the game. The English voice recording was overlooked by Scott Dolph, who reported back saying the English voice for Raiden was more neutral than the original Japanese voice.

For Metal Gear Solid 4 Flynn used a deeper voice to match the cyborg Raiden in contrast to the original, youthful Raiden of Metal Gear Solid 2. Flynn said the voice he used was "grizzled, yeah—but different enough from the style of Snake". During development of Metal Gear Solid: Rising, Flynn was not informed about the work despite Raiden being in the trailer. As a result, Flynn kept low hopes in regards to the idea of being cast. Addressing Guns of the Patriots's Raiden as more aggressive than the original one, Flynn stated his favorite take on the character was Revengeance's as it there he acted as a "blend" between the two incarnations. He felt honored for taking the role of Raiden again, having received a "Behind The Voice Actors" award for his work. In 2015, Flynn stated he was pleased with Raiden's role in Revengeance and that he would have liked a new sequel with Raiden as the lead. Internal problems between Kojima Productions and Konami, however, left Flynn worried there might not be another game in the series.

== Appearances ==
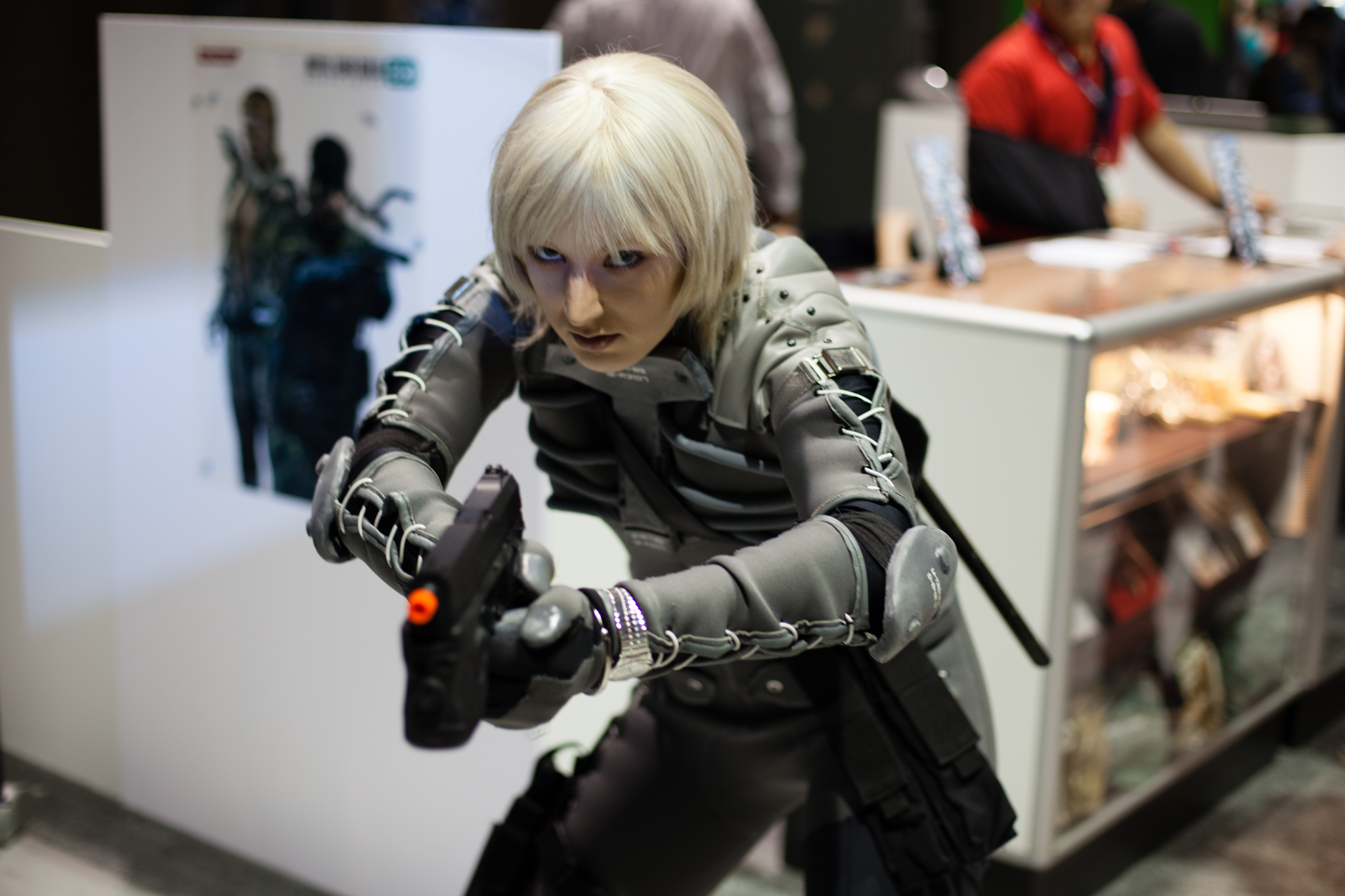
Cosplay of Raiden in Sons of Liberty (left) in and Guns of the Patriots (right).

=== Metal Gear Solid 2: Sons of Liberty ===
Metal Gear Solid 2: Sons of Liberty introduces the player to Raiden in the Plant chapter; Jack is introduced as a newly recruited, virtual reality-trained member of FOXHOUND with no live-combat experience before his current mission. He is assisted via Codec by his commanding officer the Colonel and his girlfriend Rosemary. Raiden's initial objective is to rescue several hostages from a terrorist group known as the Sons of Liberty. During his mission, Raiden is helped by mercenary Solid Snake and spy Olga Gurlukovich.

As the story progresses, Jack is revealed to be a former child soldier who fought for the Sons of Liberty leader Solidus Snake during the First Liberian Civil War. After the war's end, Raiden was given a normal life and tried to forget his past. It is revealed that a clandestine organization known as The Patriots is controlling his actions and his commanding officer is revealed as their computer-generated artificial intelligence (AI). One of their spies becomes Raiden's girlfriend and the two fall in love. Raiden defeats Solidus after the Patriots' AIs tell him his death would also trigger those of Olga's child and Rosemary, the latter of whom is revealed to have been pregnant with Raiden's child during the mission. He later reunites with Rosemary, and both decide to stay together to raise their unborn child.

=== Metal Gear Solid 4: Guns of the Patriots ===
Metal Gear Solid 4: Guns of the Patriots (set five years after Metal Gear Solid 2) features Raiden after rescuing Olga's daughter Sunny from the Patriots, and searching the corpse of the mercenary Big Boss for Big Mama in exchange. The trauma of his breakup with Rosemary and the apparent miscarriage of his child have made Raiden believe he belongs on the battlefield. Raiden is fitted with a cybernetic exoskeleton as a result of the Patriots' machinations; he helps Solid Snake in the fight against Liquid Ocelot, wanting to obtain the Patriots' powers. However, he is wounded by Vamp in a fight. With his blood having been replaced with a military substitute called "White Blood" (白血, Shiro Chi) that requires regular maintenance, Raiden is treated by Sunny and Doctor Naomi Hunter. Following his recovery, Raiden goes back to Snake, killing Vamp and stays in Ocelot's ship Outer Haven to protect Snake as he shuts down the Patriots' AIs. In an epilogue, Rosemary tells Raiden their child was not miscarried; her marriage to Roy Campbell was a hoax to protect her and their son from the Patriots. Upon hearing this news, Raiden reconciles with Rosemary.

=== Metal Gear Rising: Revengeance ===
Raiden returns as the main character in Metal Gear Rising: Revengeance, which is set four years after Metal Gear Solid 4. He is a member of the private military company (PMC) Maverick Security in multiple tasks while raising money for his family. They are attacked by a group of terrorists called Desperado Enforcement LLC that kill his protectee, N'mani, and leave Raiden near to death with mercenary Jetstream Sam taking a liking to his fighting style. He is given a new cybernetic body by the elder scientist Wilhelm "Doktor" Voight and starts working with Maverick to fight Desperado. Raiden fights Desperado's LQ-84i, an AI placed in a robot who works for Desperado but Raiden takes pity on it and has Doktor restore it under the name of Blade Wolf who assists him. Raiden's vengeful obsession with Desperado becomes personal when he discovers during a mission to Mexico that Desperado and World Marshal Inc have kidnapped many children, surgically removed their brains to place into cybernetic bodies, and were planning to subject them to VR training modeled on his own. Raiden then resigns from Maverick to pursue and retrieve the children's brain cases from World Marshal in Colorado, embracing his sadistic persona "Jack the Ripper" due to his constant struggles with Sam and Desperado's cyborg Monsoon. Raiden defeats Desperado and learns that Steven Armstrong was using PMCs to distract him as he attempts to create a new war on terror. When Blade Wolf passes Raiden's sword of the late Sam, Raiden stops Armstrong's actions and decides not to return to Maverick and travels to the Middle East to battle World Marshal mercenaries.

=== Other appearances ===
Raiden does not appear in Metal Gear Solid 3: Snake Eater but he is parodied throughout the game by debuting character Raikov. Raiden appears in a series of comical scenes in an early promotional trailer for Guns of the Patriots, in which he fights for control of the franchise with Solid Snake. A sequel to the trailer titled "Metal Gear Raiden: Snake Eraser" was produced; Raiden travels to the past to assassinate Big Boss but fails comically. In the trailer's English version, Raiden is voiced by Charlie Schlatter (the voice actor for Raikov) rather than Quinton Flynn. Raiden's Metal Gear Solid 2 version appears in the Metal Gear Solid: Portable Ops Plus expansion pack as an unlockable character. His Metal Gear Solid 4 incarnation appears as a playable character in Metal Gear Online.

In Metal Gear Solid V: Ground Zeroes, Raiden stars in a non-canonical mission titled "Jamais Vu". Having time-traveled to the past, he infiltrates Camp Omega under orders from MSF. His aim is to incapacitate a group of soldiers known as the "body snatchers", a reference to the android replicators in Kojima's video game Snatcher. In Metal Gear Solid V: The Phantom Pain, Raiden can be unlocked as a costume for the player after completing all missions on the highest possible rank. In both games, his appearance is modeled on that in Metal Gear Rising.

The Metal Gear Solid 2: Sons of Liberty 2007 comic book adaptation by Alex Garner retells Raiden's story with few changes. His relationship with Solidus is explored when he remembers his past; when Solidus is about to kill him, Raiden is saved by Snake. The game's novelization by Raymond Benson makes minor modifications to Raiden's history, except for the moment he receives Olga's sword, resulting in a change to his battle psyche. When Raiden kills Solidus he cuts the rope on Federal Hall National Memorial's flagpole, causing an American flag to cover his enemy's body. This scene was deleted from the original game due to the September 11 attacks.

Outside the Metal Gear series, Raiden appears in the video game LittleBigPlanet as a sticker and a playable sack-boy character in the Metal Gear Solid 4 downloadable content. He is an unlockable character in Evolution Skateboarding. He also appears in Super Smash Bros. Brawl and Super Smash Bros. Ultimate as a collectible sticker and spirit respectively, and in Assassin's Creed: Brotherhood as an alternative skin for Ezio Auditore da Firenze. Raiden is playable in the video games PlayStation All-Stars Battle Royale and Super Bomberman R using his Metal Gear Rising design. The webseries Mega64 includes a parody of Raiden's story in Revengeance; the character struggles against his darker persona while making breakfast. Alongside Solid Snake arriving in Fortnite: Battle Royale, Raiden has also made an appearance, as an Item Shop purchasable skin, portraying as his Metal Gear Solid 2 design. However, the alteration from his original androgynous persona over a more masculine look in Fortnite resulted in a complaint by TheMarySue for the notable overhaul. A robot dressed as Raiden makes a cameo reference in the Astro Bot (2024).

== Reception ==
=== Critical reaction ===
Raiden's replacement of fan favorite Solid Snake in Metal Gear Solid 2 proved controversial; GamesRadar considered the replacement a reason to dislike the series. The same site criticized Raiden's role in Metal Gear Solid 2 and called him one of the worst aspects of the game. Snake's voice actor, David Hayter, was also surprised by the inclusion of Raiden in Sons of Liberty, believing his character was meant to be the returning protagonist. The book Playing with Videogames states that Raiden's inclusion was intended to surprise Metal Gear fans who, instead of playing as Snake, played as his opposite. Writer James Newman commented that fans' reactions were highly negative; they acted as though Kojima had betrayed their expectations. He compared Raiden to the controversial Star Wars character Jar Jar Binks. Newman considered trailers for Metal Gear Solid 3: Snake Eater in which Raiden is mocked to be Konami's comic response to fans' disapproval. Eurogamer's Tom Bramwell enjoyed Raiden's role, commenting that his interactions with the other characters also helped expand Solid Snake's character. Raiden's introduction was given an award for "Biggest Surprise" by GameSpot in 2001, while Dave Meikleham from GamesRadar called Raiden a "surprisingly likeable character" and found his dynamic with Snake appealing. On the other hand, Raiden proved to be more popular in Japan; according to Yoji Shinkawa this was because he matched the stereotype of the manga hero.

Raiden's role in Metal Gear Solid 2 has been analyzed by several writers, who said he is intended to represent the player. His interactions with veteran Solid Snake identify the former as "a Metal Gear fan". As the game progresses it is stated that Raiden "has become Snake", having developed skills similar to those he gained from taking part in the Big Shell's fights that resemble Metal Gear Solid's Shadow Moses Island. When an artificial intelligence tells Raiden to "turn off the console", which confuses both Raiden and the player, this is first interpreted as a fourth wall-breaking joke, but the game's climax goes deeper into Raiden's connection with the player. Both the player and Raiden take different paths at the game's end; the player is told not to waste time playing games while Raiden's character is expanded with his decision to move on with his life, rejecting his previous identity by discarding the dog tags the player wore in the beginning. VG247 wrote the game helps Raiden to better distinguish himself, and for the player to distance themselves, from Snake's revered image by deconstructing the latter as an unreliable ally. The recurring plot twist involving Raiden's life and the people with whom he often interacts have been praised as being early post-truth content in a video game. The character's romantic relationship with Rosemary became popular over how much the narrative reminds the protagonist of how they met and propose in the ending.

Response to the character in subsequent games was mainly positive. GamePro's Pattrick Shaw analyzed his new design for Metal Gear Solid 4; he said Raiden "was in one hell of a fight". Gavin Mackenzie from PLAY criticized and stated that the costume was "cool" but had unnecessary accessories. It has also been compared with Gray Fox's cybernetic-ninja design in Metal Gear Solid. GameSpot staff stated that Raiden "is definitely the inheritor of the quasi-unkillable Cyborg Ninja inheritance" when he made his first appearance in a Metal Gear Solid 4 trailer. GameSpot applauded his actions in the trailer, calling it "wordlessly awesome" and comparing his stunts with those in the film Casshan: Robot Hunter. Among several cutscenes featuring Raiden, his fight with Vamp was heavily praised by critics due to finding appealing moves. Upon the revelation of Raiden's new design as a cyborg ninja, writers said he distanced himself from his previous appearance that imitated Solid Snake. For Metal Gear Solid 4, Meghan Adams sees the new design as evidence that the slightest hint of androgyny demands the use of coercive violence, even while Raiden's androgyny "is, in fact, masculine-leaning." Voice actor Reuben Langdon described Raiden as a character he always wanted to play as, most notably on Super Smash Bros. In a 2010 Famitsu readers' poll, Raiden was voted the 42nd most-popular video game character.

==== Portrayal in Metal Gear Rising: Revengeance ====
Dave Meikleham of GamesRadar said people who disliked the character would find him appealing in Rising. In 2012, manga artist Hiro Mashima drew an illustration of Raiden in anticipation of the series' following game. He mentioned having had difficulties illustrating the character. Raiden's role in Revengeance was praised by critics, with GameSpot's Peter Brown praising him as an anti-hero, and GameTrailers wrote that Raiden's new gameplay mechanics contrasted with those found in the earlier games produced by Konami. The Escapist said Raiden was now worthy of his own game based on his characterization. Polygon said that while Raiden's actions provide a departure from the stealth games, his actions were referred as "outlandish and ridiculous". The detail given to Raiden's past was also praised. IGN wrote that fans of Metal Gear Solid 4 would enjoy the game more because Raiden can replicate his moves from that game's cutscenes in gameplay. Eurogamer said a major change in Raiden's characterization is Revengeance, referring to him as a "the ultimate cyborg and also the ultimate killer" based on his darker persona that is explored in combat. The idea of Flynn's performance earned mixed response due to the tones he gives Raiden when interacting with allies and enemies. Raiden was compared with the lead characters from Devil May Cry and God of War favorably due to how they fight.

In the book Rules of Nature, Heather Alexandria, a former writer for Kotaku and Polygon, praised Raiden's dark persona as it causes an existential crisis in the protagonist's ideals of hero to his psychopath roots. Despite his anti-heroic tendencies, Raiden's humanity deeply affects BladeWolf, who stands out as a result of he being an artificial intelligence but manages to make his own rules after interacting with him several times. Another character addressed as a parallel is Sam, who comes across as Raiden's rival and starts doubting his alliance with the final boss, Armstrong, to help Raiden even after his death by providing him his weapon. Although Armstrong is Raiden's final opponent, Rich Stanton of Eurogamer preferred the rematch against Sam, calling it "classic, a desert duel for the ages". Meanwhile, Rizky Anugrah Putra in the journal Pulchra Lingua: A Journal of Language Study, Literature & Linguistics examined how the final boss track "It Has to Be This Way" illustrated the conflict between Raiden and Armstrong and how both men wanting to make the world better, with Armstrong dreaming of America "becoming a country where every citizen can realize and fight for his dreams". However, despite being able to apprehend each other's viewpoints and knowing violence would only make things worse, Armstrong's ideals are so extreme that the only resolution is violent conflict, and the resulting destruction will bring change.

Raiden finding conviction with his inner past persona during Revengeance was noted to go with the ideas of enjoying the hack and slash mechanics, leading to the handling of violence in video games. In further analysis of Raiden's persona from Metal Gear Rising, PlayStation LifeStyle praised how the game makes a heavy analysis of Raiden's psychology when he starts questioning his missions' cause and delve into his psychotic instincts when meeting Monsoon. During this scene, Raiden allows himself to go back to his Jack the Ripper persona so that the children he has to save do not meet the same fate as a result of the George Sears Programm which aims to create more soldiers like Raiden. PlayStation Life Style found Raiden's mindset to be unique in gaming as both the protagonist and the gamer are addressed about all the previous missions explored before in the title as Raiden had already killed several soldiers to achieve his means. This contrasts other violent video game protagonists Kratos from God of War or Nathan Drake from Uncharted whose actions are never questioned in their stories while Raiden instead accepts the sins he has committed.

== See also ==
- Jack the Ripper in fiction
- Ninja in popular culture
