= Child soldiers in Liberia =

1989 civil war in Liberia

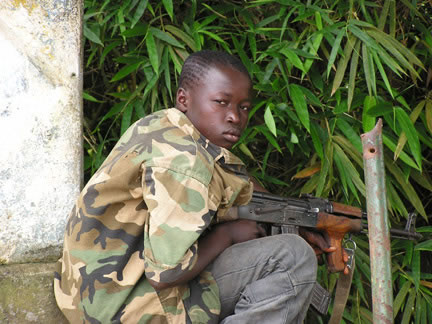
LURD child fighter -A child soldier of the Liberian rebel group LURD at the Po River (2004).

The First Liberian Civil War began in 1989, when Charles Taylor's National Patriotic Front of Liberia (NPFL) forces invaded the country in rebellion against the regime of Samuel Doe, who came to power through the 1980 Liberian coup d'état. Liberians United for Reconciliation and Democracy (LURD), Movement for Democracy in Liberia (MODEL), the United Liberation Movement for Democracy (ULIMO), as well as the NPFL utilized children as an integral aspect of their forces over the course of both armed conflicts, organizing them into factions such as the Small Boys Unit. The First Liberian Civil War as well as the Second Liberian Civil War saw thousands of children were forced to participate in armed conflict, resulting in an estimated figure of 21,000 child soldiers in need of demobilization, rehabilitation, and reintegration following the end of the Second Liberian Civil War in 2003, which concluded with the signage of the Comprehensive Peace Agreement. In the years following the war, the Liberian government was implemented measures to promote their international and national commitment to reintegrating and supporting former Children in the military.

== International laws regarding the use of child soldiers ==
=== Geneva Conventions of 1949 and additional 1977 protocols ===
The Geneva Conventions of 1949 and the additional 1977 protocols, specifically Protocol II states that children under fifteen should not be conscripted into armies or allowed to take part in armed conflicts. This document and its provisions, which are binding to both state parties and opposition groups, were agreed to by Liberia in March 1954 and June 1988 respectively.

=== United Nations Declaration on the Rights of the Child 1989 ===
The 1989 United Nations Convention on the Rights of the Child condemned the recruitment and direct involvement of persons aged fifteen years and younger in armed conflict, per Article 38. Furthermore, the document also mandates that governments commit to advancing the social reintegration, as well as the physical and psychological recovery of children involved in armed conflict, per Article 39. This document was ratified and signed by Liberia on July 4, 1993.

== Recruitment ==
=== Methods ===
Both governmental troops and opposition groups were known to forcibly recruit children into their armed forces. Common methods often include threats of violence against the individual and/or their loved ones, and coercion. There have also been instances of children voluntarily joining troops. Causes of voluntary conscription may include the desire to seek avenge dead loved ones, and a means of seeking protection, as conflict generates loss of parents and family members, often forcing children to find a means to fend for themselves. Additionally, children often join armed forces to alleviate the effects of poverty exacerbated by warfare, which often leads to food shortages and economic instability that affects many.

=== Uses for children during armed conflicts ===
The term "child soldier" was defined by UNICEF in 2005 as any male or female person younger than 18 years of age who participates in the activities of any armed forces or groups in any capacity. During these armed conflicts, children were used as armed soldiers, spies and informants, cooks, staff at military checkpoints, cannon fodder, errand runners, and forced sexual companions.

=== Rationale ===
The prevalence of the use of children as soldiers in armed conflicts is dominated by notions that children are more obedient and easier to manipulate, quicker to learn fighting skills, less costly, more expendable, and pose a moral challenge to enemies.

== Effects of war on children ==
=== Psychological ===
Former child soldiers often suffer from high levels of psychosocial trauma, resulting in post-traumatic stress and major depressive disorder, risks of suicide, all of which are higher among children who experienced sexual violence. Child ex-combatants also experience severe post-traumatic stress disorder, the symptoms of which are nightmares and sleeplessness, flashbacks, bedwetting, and depression and anxiety. The stigmatization of former child soldiers has also caused them to suffer from shame and guilt.

=== Physical ===
Child soldiers often faced physical and sexual abuse at the hands of these armed groups. Children were beaten, subjected to a form of torture called "tabay", in which their elbows were tied together behind their back, and forced to consume drugs and alcohol.

=== Social ===
Child soldiering also has implications on the social development of children, as they struggle to develop identities independent of their pasts as combatants and commanders. Former child soldiers also notably struggle to build and foster healthy relationships due to trust issues. Lack of education and the prevalence of illiteracy puts former child soldiers at risk of living in poverty.

== Government-sanctioned reintegration programs ==
The first phase of reintegration occurred following the ceasefire in 1997, which concluded the end of the First Liberian Civil War, however reintegration programs were not implemented nationally and there were not enough NGOs present to support these efforts.

Following the signage of the Comprehensive Peace Agreement in 2003, the Liberian National Transitional Government created the National Commission on Disarmament, Demobilization, Rehabilitation, and Reintegration (NCDDRR). Collaborating with local and international non-governmental organizations (NGOs), such as Don Bosco Homes and Children Assistance Program, community and faith-based organizations as well as the private sector, the NCDDRR worked to implement reintegration programs. The NCDDRR also created the Joint Implementation Unit, to aid in the implementation of programs related to educational and psychological development of former child soldiers.

=== Family Reunification ===
Family reunification programs were spearheaded by NGOs, and their primary function was to reconnect children with members of their immediate or extended family in attempt to aid to their psychological rehabilitation and social reintegration. Family, friends, and relatives are all social support networks deemed essential to combating the impact of psychological trauma, and promote a healthy re-transition into society. In the event that a child's family could not be located or their family is unable to provide them with the adequate support and assistance necessary for reintegration, children were placed in alternative family-based living arrangements. The NGOs sought to stress the importance of forgiveness and acceptance during these programs, organizing meetings between families and community based organizations to foster open conversations, as well as using radio, media, and flyers to disseminate messages.

=== Economic reintegration ===
Economic reintegration was two fold, and existed in the forms of educational support and skill acquisition. Educational support was primarily a collaboration between NCDDRR, the private sector, and NGOs such as UNICEF, who created the Community Education Investment Program which provided standard elementary education to former child soldiers. The most common form of educational support were maximum three-year education and financial assistance programs. Under these programs, the children were guaranteed one year of educational and financial support, but year two and year three were dependent on the child's academic performance. Financial support existed in the forms of paid tuition, registration fees, books and supplies, uniforms, and subsistence allowances given to children who maintained at least 75% attendance during their time in the program. Skill acquisition training usually lasted between six and nine months, and during this time children were instructed in profession such as baking, carpentry, shoe-making, mechanics, and agriculture, and also given subsistence allowances if they maintained 75% attendance. Additionally, participants reported to have received management and saving skills training, as well as leadership development training. Upon completion of these programs, the children were equipped with start up tools and financial assistance to establish their own small businesses.

=== Psychological rehabilitation and social reintegration ===
Family reunification, educational support, and skill acquisition were all regarded as elements of psychological rehabilitation because they were meant to reinforce positive socialization and constructs of new identities independent of war. NGOs were reported to have provided psychological and social counseling to former child soldiers and ex-combatants. Along with counseling provided by the NCDDRR, NGOs, and faith-based/community organizations, another method of psychological rehabilitation was traditional healing and cleansing ceremonies. These ceremonies centered around the belief that children who underwent them would be forgiven by the gods of the land, and this perceived forgiveness would bolster their acceptance back into their communities and foster a degree of self-forgiveness.

== Shortcomings of Reintegration ==
Limited educational support, lack of housing, and the socio-economic reality of Liberia all posed barriers to the success of reintegration programs. The efforts of NGOs operating in Liberia post the civil-war conflict included limited funding, corruption, and staff issues, all of which impacted the effectiveness and implementation of reintegration efforts.

== New governmental policies ==
In August 1993, the United Nations Observer Mission in Liberia (UNOMIL), was created to report breaches of humanitarian international law and investigate human rights violations

=== Cotonou Accords ===
The Cotonou Accords, a cease fire agreement signed on July 25, 1993, instigated disarmament and demobilization, as well as mandated the UN and other international organizations to organize and support demobilization and reintegration of ex-combatants. A further addition to the Cotonou Accords, the Akosombo Agreement signed September 12, 1994, calls for the creation of encampment centers during demobilization to support the education, rehabilitation, and reintegration of former soldiers.

=== Committee on the Rights of the Child ===
In 2008, Liberia submitted a report to the United Nations Convention on the Rights of the Child, more specifically to the Committee on the Rights of the Child. In this document, the current state of policy regarding children was assessed, and recommendation for future domestic legislation. The Children's Law reiterates the provisions of the original 1989 United Nations Convention on the Rights of the Child, and established the recruitment or enlisting in armed forces to take part in conflict as a first degree felony. Additionally, a Children's Protection Unit was created, as was a national-level Children's Reference Group, which works in collaboration with the Children's Parliament to collect and advance the interests of children.

== Fictional Child Soldiers ==
A character called Raiden was a child fighting in Liberia due to his ingame background lore in Metal Gear Solid 2: Sons of Liberty
