= Fossil Fighters =

- Genre: Role-playing video game
- Publisher: Nintendo
- First release: Fossil Fighters; 2008
- Latest release: Fossil Fighters: Frontier; 2014

Fossil Fighters is a role-playing video game series published by Nintendo for the Nintendo DS and Nintendo 3DS consoles. Its gameplay revolves around digging up and extracting dinosaur fossils, reviving them into supernatural "vivosaurs" and engaging in battle.

== Games ==
Release timeline
2008	Fossil Fighters
2009
2010	Fossil Fighters: Champions
2011
2012
2013
2014	Fossil Fighters: Frontier

=== Fossil Fighters ===
The first video game in the series was developed by Nintendo SPD, Red Entertainment, M2, and Artdink and published by Nintendo for the Nintendo DS. It was first released in Japan on April 17, 2008, and was later released in North America on August 10, 2009, and in Australia on September 17, 2009.

=== Fossil Fighters: Champions ===
The second video game was developed by Nintendo SPD, Red Entertainment, M2, and Artdink and published by Nintendo for the Nintendo DS. It was released in Japan on November 18, 2010, and in North America on November 14, 2011.

=== Fossil Fighters: Frontier ===
The third video game was developed by Spike Chunsoft, with assistance from Red Entertainment and Cyclone Zero, and published by Nintendo for the Nintendo 3DS. It was released in Japan on February 27, 2014, then in North America on March 20, 2015, and in Europe on May 29, 2015, making it the first installment of the series to be officially released in that part of the world.
