= GG Aleste 3 =

- Developer: M2
- Publisher: M2
- Director: Manabu Namiki
- Producer: Naoki Horii
- Designers: Manabu Namiki; Kazuyuki Nakashima
- Programmer: Takashi Yamashita
- Artists: Kazuyuki Nakashima; Kisai Takayama; Shinsuke Yamakawa
- Composer: Manabu Namiki
- Series: Aleste
- Platforms: Game Gear, (Note: The game is programmed for and runs on Game Gear consoles. It never received a physical release for the platform, but the ROM image was released on the Game Gear Micro microhandheld.) Nintendo Switch, PlayStation 4
- Release: JP: December 24, 2020 (Aleste Collection)
- Genre: Vertically scrolling shooter
- Mode: Single-player

GG Aleste 3 (Note: Japanese: GGアレスタ3, Hepburn: GG Aresuta 3) is a 2020 vertically scrolling shooter video game developed and published by M2. It was included as part of the Aleste Collection for Nintendo Switch and PlayStation 4, as well as in a Game Gear Micro variant bundled as part of a limited edition. An entry in the Aleste series, the game follows Luna Waizen, a pilot candidate scrambled into service after destruction of the Moon Child base and fight against cyber terrorists that have seized control of the Earth's satellites. It retains the same gameplay conventions as the original GG Aleste and GG Aleste 2, with the player fighting endless waves of enemies while avoiding collision with their projectiles and other obstacles.

GG Aleste 3 was created for the Game Gear hardware by staff who worked on shoot 'em up titles from the 1990s such as Blazing Lazers, Super Star Soldier and Battle Garegga, led by designer and composer Manabu Namiki. It garnered generally favorable reception from critics.

== Gameplay ==
Gameplay screenshot

GG Aleste 3 is a vertical-scrolling shoot 'em up game. The plot follows Luna Waizen, a pilot candidate from the Earth Orbital Army Lunar Defense Corps, who is scrambled into service after destruction of the Moon Child base to fight against cyber terrorists that have seized control of the Earth's satellites. Prior to starting, a configuration menu is presented where multiple option settings can be altered. Its gameplay follows the same conventions as the original GG Aleste and GG Aleste 2; The player controls the "Are Savior" fighter craft through seven increasingly difficult stages over a constantly scrolling background, populated with an assortment of enemy forces and obstacles, and the scenery never stops moving until a boss is reached, which must be fought to progress further.

The player has a main weapon that can be powered up by collecting "Power Chips". There are also six different special weapons that can be picked up and upgraded if the same weapon is picked up that is currently being used. The bomb mechanic introduced in GG Aleste 2 was replaced with a shield power-up instead, which is activated once twenty Power Chips are collected and allows the player to only absorb one enemy hit. Getting hit will result in losing a life, as well as a penalty of decreasing the Are Savior's firepower to its original state and the game is over once all lives are lost, though the player has limited continues to keep playing.

== Development and release ==
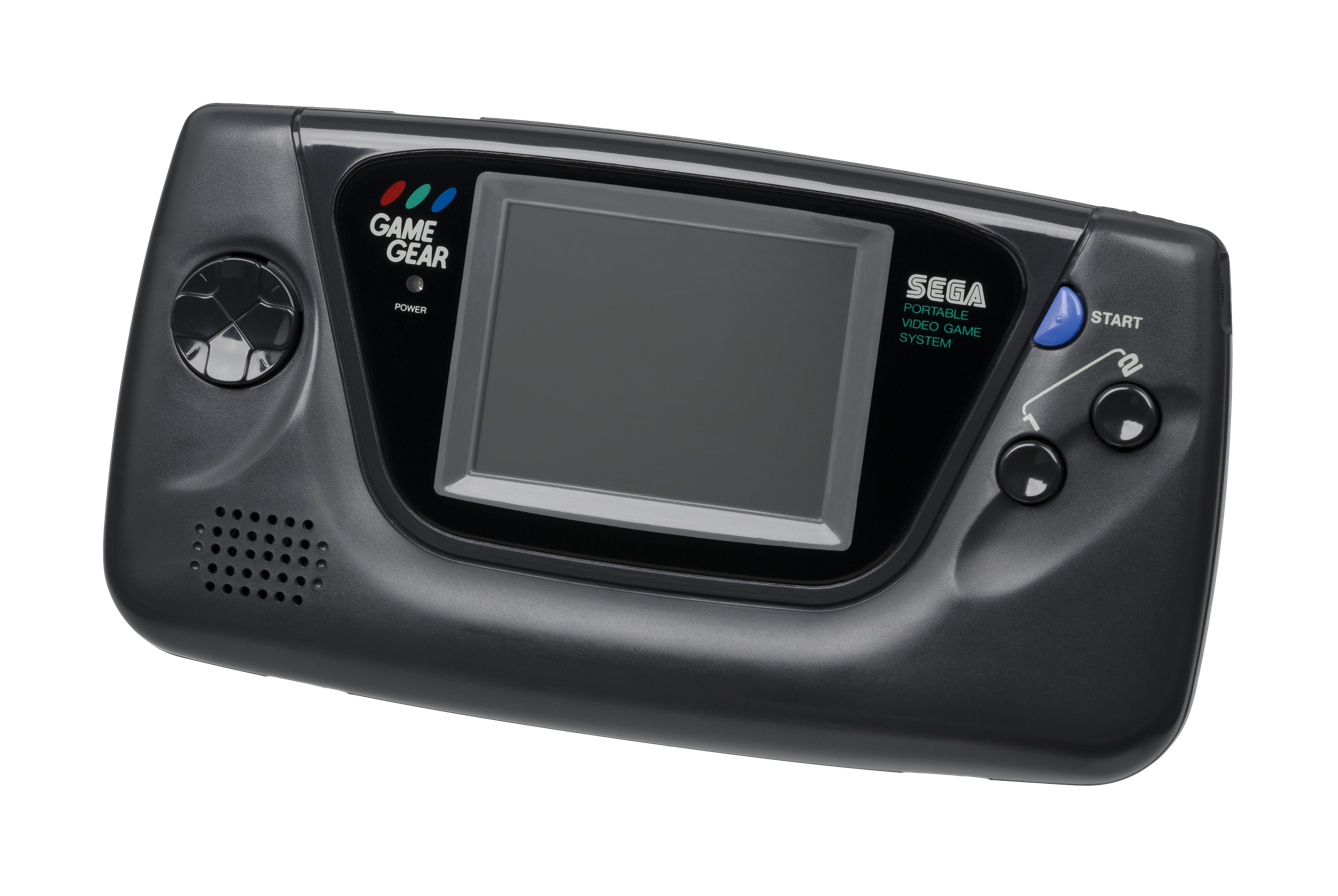
GG Aleste 3 was developed for the Game Gear.

GG Aleste 3 was developed for the Game Gear hardware by M2, a company regarded for its high-quality video game re-releases. Its staff was conformed by a number of people who worked on shoot 'em up titles from the 1990s. It was directed by Manabu Namiki (of Battle Garegga, DoDonPachi DaiOuJou and Deathsmiles), who was also in charge as game designer and composer. M2 CEO Naoki Horii led its development as producer. Kazuyuki Nakashima (of Blazing Lazers, MUSHA, Seirei Senshi Spriggan and Mahou Daisakusen) acted as co-game designer. Nakashima also acted as co-graphic designer alongside Shinsuke Yamakawa of Battle Garegga. Takashi "Faw.Labo" Yamashita of Super Star Soldier and Star Parodier served as the game's programmer. Kisai Takayama, known for bishōjo games such as KimiKiss and Amagami, was commissioned as character illustrator.

GG Aleste 3 was first announced at the 2020 Tokyo Game Show as part of the Aleste Collection, which was released in Japan by M2 under their publishing label M2 ShotTriggers for Nintendo Switch and PlayStation 4 on December 24. To denote its authenticity as a Game Gear title, Sega gave it an official production code, while a physical copy was also created, complete with packaging mimicking officially licensed Game Gear releases. It was included in a Game Gear Micro variant as well, bundled as part of a limited edition for the Aleste Collection, featuring all of the same games as in the main compilation. An album containing the game's original soundtrack and other games featured in the Aleste Collection was distributed in Japan by Wave Master on April 21, 2022.

== Reception ==
Reception

Review scores
Publication	Score
Nintendo Life	8/10
Wireframe	(NS) 81%

GG Aleste 3, as part of the Aleste Collection, garnered generally favorable reception from critics. Nintendo Life's Kerry Brunskill regarded it as one of the best Game Gear games that pushes the hardware to its limits and a welcomed addition in the collection. Hardcore Gaming 101's Kurt Kalata found it to be "an outstanding 8-bit shooter", lauding its visuals effects and impressive boss encounters. Nevertheless, Kalata questioned M2 for choosing the Game Gear hardware due to its limited screen resolution and felt that the soundtrack was noisy.

Wireframe's Ryan Lambie reviewed the Nintendo Switch version of the collection, praising it for capturing a "cinematic sense of occasion" compared to modern shooters. Lambie called it a "satisfying throwback" to shooters by Compile, commending its fresh balance, design and fast-pacing, but expressed disappointment that the collection was only available in Japan. Eurogamer's Thomas Nickel highlighted its large bosses, pixel art and balanced difficulty curve. Nickel wrote that "It's a magnificent trip down memory lane for the old school-shooter-crowd." Rice Digital's Pete Davison commended its useful subweapons, bosses, solid difficulty and soundtrack. Davidson wrote that it stood up "very well next to the very best titles the 16-bit home consoles have to offer."
