= Power Strike II (Game Gear video game) =

1993 video game

- Developer: Compile
- Publisher: Sega
- Director: Takafumi Tanida
- Producer: Masamitsu Niitani
- Designers: Hiroki Kodama; Takumi Yamashita
- Programmer: Takumi Yamashita
- Artists: Hiroki Kodama; Hiroshi Konishi
- Composers: Chie Ōya; Tomonori Minami
- Series: Aleste
- Platform: Game Gear
- Release: JP: October 1, 1993; EU: 1993
- Genre: Vertically scrolling shooter
- Mode: Single-player

Power Strike II (Note: Known in Japan as GG Aleste II (Japanese: GGアレスタ II, Hepburn: GG Aresuta II; subtitled Lance Bird)) is a 1993 vertically scrolling shooter video game developed by Compile and published by Sega for the Game Gear. An entry in the Aleste series, it is a follow-up to GG Aleste (1991). The game follows Alice Waizen piloting the Lance Bird space fighter craft to stop an unknown parasitic object attached to the armored defense satellite Algo. Its gameplay is similar to the previous Aleste entry on Game Gear, with the player fighting enemies and bosses, while avoiding collision with their projectiles and other obstacles.

Power Strike II was co-designed by Hiroki Kodama and Takumi Yamashita, with Takafumi Tanida and Masamitsu Niitani serving as director and producer respectively. Work on the project began after completion of Spriggan Mark 2: Re-Terraform Project, as Tainda asked Kodama to make it, who wanted to let his talent bloom prior to Robo Aleste entering production. The game garnered generally favorable reception from critics. The title was included as part of the Aleste Collection for Nintendo Switch and PlayStation 4, as well as in a Game Gear Micro variant bundled as part of a limited edition with all games from the main compilation. It was followed by GG Aleste 3 (2020), while two of the game's staff members would later work on a homebrew shooter for the Game Gear titled Gunstream.

== Gameplay ==
Gameplay screenshot

Power Strike II is a vertical-scrolling shoot 'em up game. The plot follows Alice Waizen, cousin of GG Aleste protagonist Ellinor Waizen, piloting the Lance Bird space fighter craft to stop an unknown parasitic object attached to the armored defense satellite Algo. Prior to starting, the player has the option to change the game's difficulty. Its gameplay is similar to the previous Game Gear entry; The player controls the Lance Bird fighter craft through six increasingly difficult stages over a constantly scrolling background, populated with an assortment of enemy forces and obstacles, and the scenery never stops moving until a boss is reached, which must be fought to progress further. After the second and fifth stages is a bonus round reminiscent of After Burner, where enemies fly in a preset formation the player must shoot them down.

The player has a main weapon that can be powered up by collecting "Power Chips". There are also four different special weapons to obtain and these can be upgraded if the same weapon that is currently being used is picked up. The player can also select their starting weapon at the beginning. The Lance Bird is equipped with a limited number of bombs that damages on-screen objects upon their detonation. Getting hit will result in losing a life, as well as a penalty of decreasing the ship's firepower to its original state and the game is over once all lives are lost, though the player has limited continues to keep playing.

== Development and release ==
Power Strike II (also known as GG Aleste II) was created by Compile, which had previously developed GG Aleste (1991) for the Game Gear. It was directed by Takafumi "Taka" Tanida, who was head of development at Compile, and produced by Masamitsu Niitani. Hiroki Kodama and programmer Takumi "Takin" Yamashita served as the game's co-designers. Kodama also acted as co-graphic artist alongside Hiroshi "Tan" Konishi. The sound was handled by Chie "Imami Pon" Ōya and Tomonori "Ba.M" Minami under supervision of Masanobu Tsukamoto. The staff recounted the project's creation process through interviews.

Development started after completion of Spriggan Mark 2: Re-Terraform Project, with Tanida asking Kodama to make the title, who wanted to let his talent bloom before production on Robo Aleste began. Yamashita occasionally entered into disputes with co-workers due to his obsession with programming, prompting a rule to let him be free during the process. The pseudo-3D bonus stages were implemented at the request of Kodama. Manabu Namiki, planner and director of its follow-up GG Aleste 3 (2020), commented that there were no shared sound effects between GG Aleste and GG Aleste II. Kodama replied to his question, stating that there might be changes in the sound driver but was unsure. The game was intended to be four megabits but its ROM size was halved to 2 megabits, leading to the alteration of certain elements but bosses were made larger. As the Game Gear's screen was prone to afterimages, enemy bullets were colored red and green to improve overall visibility.

The game was first scheduled by Sega to be released for the Game Gear in September 1993, but was launched in Japan under the title GG Aleste II on October 1 instead, and later in Europe under the name Power Strike II that same year. The title was included as part of the Aleste Collection, which was released in Japan by M2 under their publishing label M2 ShotTriggers for Nintendo Switch and PlayStation 4 on December 24, 2020. It was also added in a Game Gear Micro variant, bundled as part of a limited edition for the Aleste Collection, which contained all games from the main compilation. An album containing the game's original soundtrack and other titles featured in the Aleste Collection was distributed in Japan by Wave Master on April 21, 2022. Two of the game's staff members would later work on a homebrew shooter for the Game Gear titled Gunstream.

== Reception ==
Reception

Review scores
Publication	Score
Aktueller Software Markt	9/12
Beep! MegaDrive	6.5/10
Consoles +	65%
Famitsu	22/40
HobbyConsolas	86/100
Jeuxvideo.com	18/20
Joypad	84%
Mega Fun	82%
Player One	69%
Video Games (DE)	81%
Hippon Super!	5/10
Megablast	83%
Play Time	80%
TodoSega	83/100

Power Strike II was met with generally favorable reception from critics. Readers of the Japanese Sega Saturn Magazine voted to give the game a 8.3385 out of 10 score, ranking among Game Gear titles at the number 13 spot in a 1995 public poll. Joypad's Nourdine "Trazom" Nini regarded the game's graphical effects as impressive for the Game Gear. Nini also praised its responsive controls, animations, customizable options and audio, but saw the occasional sprite flickering and issues with collision detection as negative points.

Mega Fun's Martin Weidner agreed, lauding its technical performance for pushing the Game Gear's limit, audiovisual presentation, "exemplary" playability, sophisticated weapon system and well thoughtout stage design. Consoles +' Marc Menier disagreed with Nini and Weidner, finding the overall presentation unremarkable and criticizing the inconsistent visuals, "insipid" music, use of unlimited continues and collision detection issues. Regardless, Menier commended the title for its fast-pacing and sound effects. Player One's François "Elwood" Tarrain felt that game's problems lied with slowdown that interfere with gameplay when too many sprites are present on-screen and difficulty to distinguish elements due to the Game Gear's screen visibility.

HobbyConsolas' Antonio "Boke" Caravaca praised the colorful visuals, enemy variety, sound effects, controls, diversity of weapons and items, as well as the multiple difficulty levels, calling it "The best shooter appeared for Sega's handheld." Nevertheless, he remarked that its music goes out between so many explosions and sounds of shots. Megablast's Richard Löwenstein concurred with Caravaca, regarding Power Strike II to be on par with R-Type and Nemesis on Game Boy. Spanish magazine TodoSega commended its detailed graphics, pacing, sound effects, and addictive gameplay, recommending it for shoot 'em up fans. However, they felt that "The musical accompaniment is not as good as we would like".

Video Games' Ralph Karels gave the game positive remarks for its audiovisual presentation, action and consistent technical department. Aktueller Software Markt's Jürgen Borngießer highlighted its fun factor but criticized the audio. Play Time's Ulf Schneider expressed that "With this title, the shoot 'em up specialists from Compile once again delivered a convincing action game." Jeuxvideo.com's Shametblame praised the visual department for making use of the Game Gear's capabilities, gameplay, longevity and sound. Shametblame regarded it as a "worthy successor" to GG Aleste and "the best shoot'em up available on 8-bit portable consoles". Hardcore Gaming 101's Kurt Kalata opined that "there's not as much that stands apart as unique or innovative on this title, other than it being one of the very few quality shoot-em-ups for a portable platform."
