= GG Aleste =

1991 video game

- Developer: Compile
- Publisher: Compile
- Producer: Masamitsu Niitani
- Designers: Hiroki Kodama; Yukinori Taniguchi
- Programmer: Yukinori Taniguchi
- Artist: Hiroki Kodama
- Composers: Keiji Takeuchi; Toshiaki Sakoda
- Series: Aleste
- Platform: Game Gear
- Release: JP: December 29, 1991
- Genre: Vertically scrolling shooter
- Mode: Single-player

GG Aleste (Note: Japanese: GGアレスタ, Hepburn: GG Aresuta) is a 1991 vertically scrolling shooter video game developed and published by Compile for the Game Gear. An entry in the Aleste series, the Players Controls Ellinor Waizen the pilot of Galvanic Gunner space fighter craft to face against the invading Moon Child army. Its gameplay follows the same conventions as earlier Aleste titles, with the player fighting waves of enemies and bosses, while avoiding collision with their projectiles and other obstacles.

GG Aleste was co-designed by graphic designer Hiroki Kodama and programmer Yukinori Taniguchi, with Masamitsu Niitani serving as producer. The project was initially overseen by Kengo Morita (of Puyo Puyo) before Kodama hurriedly took over, who made it out of pride as a Compile staffer. Because of his previous experience with the MSX, Kodama was able to develop for the Game Gear despite his lack of experience making software for consoles, in addition of facing difficulties with it due to not being aware of its hardware specifications. The game garnered generally favorable reception from critics, all of which reviewed it as an import title. The title was included as part of the Aleste Collection for Nintendo Switch and PlayStation 4, as well as in a Game Gear Micro variant bundled as part of a limited edition with all games from the main compilation. It was followed by GG Aleste II (1993).

== Gameplay ==
Gameplay screenshot

GG Aleste is a vertical-scrolling shoot 'em up game. The plot takes place in an alternative continuity and follows Ellinor Waizen, daughter of the original Aleste protagonist Raymond Waizen, piloting the Galvanic Gunner space fighter craft to face against the invading Moon Child army and free the Earth. Its gameplay follows the same conventions as earlier Aleste entries; The player controls the Galvanic Gunner fighter craft through seven increasingly difficult stages over a constantly scrolling background, populated with an assortment of enemy forces and obstacles, and the scenery never stops moving until a boss is reached, which must be fought to progress further. These stages primarily scroll vertically, but they can scroll horizontally. Prior to the fourth and sixth stages is a bonus round, where enemies fly in a preset formation without firing at the player.

The player has a main weapon that can be powered up by collecting "Power Chips". There are also eight different special weapons to obtain and these can be upgraded if the same weapon that is currently being used is picked up. Though the game has no bomb mechanic, the Galvanic Gunner detonates a powerful blast that damages on-screen objects upon its destruction. However, the player's ship respawns immediately at the location they died at, with decreased firepower as a penalty. Once all lives are lost, the game is over, though the player has unlimited continues to keep playing.

== Development and release ==
GG Aleste was created by Compile, which had previously developed for the Game Gear prior to the game. It was produced by Masamitsu Niitani, with graphic designer Hiroki Kodama and programmer Yukinori "Akaby" Taniguchi being in charge as co-planners. The music was co-composed by Keiji Takeuchi and Toshiaki Sakoda. Other staff members also collaborated during development, including supervisor Takayuki "Jemini" Hirono and Kazuyuki Nakashima acting as concept adviser. The team recounted its creation process through interviews. Both Kodama and Nakashima revealed that the project was originally handled by Kengo Morita (of Puyo Puyo) and Ellinor was already set as the main character, but Kodama hurriedly took over afterwards. Kodama had no experience creating software for consoles, but had previous experience making software for MSX and was able to develop without being aware of the different hardware specifications. Kodama also claimed he made it desperately out of pride, feeling he could not make "something embarrassing" as a Compile staffer. Kodama made decisions by listening to opinions of those around him during production. Kodama met Taniguchi during development and when proposing a space colony setpiece, he was particularly impressed with a suggestion by Taniguchi to make it rotate. Kodama faced difficulties with restrictions of the Game Gear, but the programming support provided by Hirono was enough for him to concentrate on the artwork, while boss designs were outsourced by Nakashima. Nakashima used the album name, "Moon Child", of a band he heard often during production for the seventh stage.

GG Aleste was initially scheduled by Compile to be released for the Game Gear in November 1991, but was launched in Japan on December 29 instead. The game was included as part of the Aleste Collection, which was released in Japan by M2 under their publishing label M2 ShotTriggers for Nintendo Switch and PlayStation 4 on December 24, 2020. It was also added in a Game Gear Micro variant, bundled as part of a limited edition for the Aleste Collection, featuring all of the same titles as in the main compilation. An album containing the game's original soundtrack and other games featured in the Aleste Collection was distributed in Japan by Wave Master on April 21, 2022.

== Reception ==
Reception

Review scores
Publication	Score
Beep! MegaDrive	7.0/10
Famitsu	23/40
Jeuxvideo.com	16/20
Joystick	93%
Video Games (DE)	80%
Console XS	91/100
Game Zone	55/100
Gamers	2-
Hippon Super!	7/10
Power Play	79%
Sega Pro	89/100

GG Aleste was met with generally favorable reception from critics, all of which reviewed it as an import title. Readers of the Japanese Sega Saturn Magazine voted to give the game a 8.1232 out of 10 score, ranking among Game Gear titles at the number 20 spot in a 1995 public poll. Joystick's Olivier Prézeau lauded the game's graphical department for its smooth scrolling, setpieces and animations, as well as the controls and sound, recommending it for shooter fans. Game Zone's Paul Lakin found it to be a "very standard futuristic shoot 'em up with some slightly odd scrolling", as he felt the constant change between vertical and diagonal scrolling did not make it interesting nor challenging. Lakin also expressed that the Game Gear's "washed out" screen made it difficult to watch enemies. Sega Pro's Damian Butt praised the visuals for its backgrounds and bosses, and was impressed with the enemies' attack patterns. Butt also commended the game's "vibrant" soundtrack, easy to pick up gameplay, weapon selection and length. However, he saw its low difficulty as a negative point for more experienced players.

Power Play's Martin Gaksch gave positive remarks to the audiovisual presentation, remarking that "GG Aleste is a beautiful shooting game and one of the most fascinating Game Gear cartridges." German publication Gamers noted that the game can be difficult and hectic for less experience players. Regardless, they found the in-game action technically impressive for the system, while also commending its weapon system and use of unlimited continues. Video Games' Julian Eggebrecht particularly criticized the seventh stage due to its "boring" visual style. Nevertheless, Eggebrecht praised the title for the graphics, music and gameplay. Console XS noted its smooth scrolling visuals, original bosses and sound effects. They also gave positive ratings for its gameplay and challenge. Jeuxvideo.com's Shametblame highlighted its graphical presentation due to the number of sprites on-screen, lack of slowdown, stage variety and large bosses. Shametblame also commended its playability similar to other Aleste entries, balanced replayability and soundtrack, regarding it as its follow-up GG Aleste II as two of the best shooters on 8-bit handhelds. Hardcore Gaming 101's Kurt Kalata opined that "the main problem with GG Aleste – and the main reason why shooters are so rare on these systems – is that it's hard to play on a blurry portable screen. The scrolling isn't as fast as a typical Aleste game, but it's still difficult to make everything out, especially the small sprites."
