= Dangun Feveron =

1998 arcade game

- Advertising flyer
- Developer(s): Cave
- Publisher(s): Nihon System
- Producer(s): Kenichi Takano
- Artist(s): Hiroyuki Tanaka
- Platform(s): Arcade, PlayStation 4, Xbox One
- Release: JP: September 1998; NA: 1998
- Genre(s): Vertical-scrolling shooter
- Mode(s): Single-player, multiplayer

Dangun Feveron (弾銃フィーバロン, Dangan Fībaron), also known as Fever SOS, is a 1998 vertical-scrolling shooter arcade game developed by Cave and published by Nihon System in Japan. Players control a fighter craft and must destroy waves of enemies throughout a series of scrolling stages that increase in difficulty. The game's scoring system is designed to encourage players to destroy as many enemies possible, as points are subtracted based on how many enemies leave the screen. It is known for its elaborate disco-inspired presentation, soundtrack, and sassy voiceovers.

Developed in conjunction with ESP Ra.De. (1998), Dangun Feveron began production as a more generic take on the scrolling shooter genre. The disco theme was chosen after Cave received negative feedback from location testing, and wanting the game to have its own unique ideas and mechanics. Critics praised the game's unique scoring system and absurdity, though some questioned the quality of the gameplay itself. Feveron did not see any contemporary home ports until it was released for the PlayStation 4 and Xbox One in 2016 by M2.

== Gameplay ==
The player destroying waves of enemies

Dangun Feveron is a vertical-scrolling shooter video game. Its plot involves an organization named the Great Gracce attempting to seize control of Earth as part of its plan to conquer the entire universe. The residents of a nearby planet named Fever are alerted of this, and deploy a group of starfighters to destroy the Great Gracce and its leader before they take Earth and its population captive.

Players select one of three starfighters, which possess different shot types, speed, and power. These starfighters are tasked with completing each level by destroying formations of enemies and avoiding collision with them and their projectiles. The game features a disco-inspired presentation, which serves importance to the gameplay through "cyborg soldiers", miniature people that can be collected to increase the score multiplayer. Collecting cyborgs and destroying enemies is often accompanied by a sassy-toned announcer. The scoring system is designed to encourage players to destroy as many enemies as possible; points are subtracted from the player's score if any enemies leave the screen.

Power-ups are dropped by certain enemies throughout each stage that enhances the player's abilities. There are also bombs that clear the screen of enemies when fired and other items that increase the score. Levels become more challenging as the player progresses, introducing new enemy types that react faster to the player's attacks and those that require more hits to destroy. The game contains a hidden time attack mode where players try to score as many points possible within three minutes.

== Development and release ==
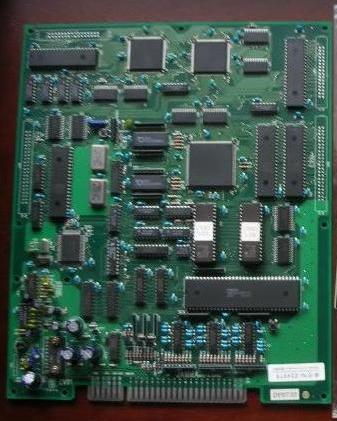
Dangun Feveron arcade PCB

Dangun Feveron was developed by Cave, a company known for creating "bullet hell" shoot 'em ups such as the DonPachi series. The game was produced by Kenichi Takano, one of the founding members of Cave, and in development alongside the vertical shooter ESP Ra.De. (1998). Feveron was originally a more generic take on the shooter genre, but the team wanted it to have its own unique presentation and mechanics after the game returned generally unfavorable results at location tests. Several meetings were held to discuss ideas, where one Cave employee suggested the disco theme. The game was revised multiple times, with the final revision focusing on gameplay centered around dodging fast-moving projectiles. In one of these revisions, the cyborg soldiers were originally the projectiles that were fired from the player's ship. Early names for Feveron included Fever SOS and Baro Fever; Fever SOS was re-used as the game's international title.

Dangun Feveron's elaborate disco-themed soundtrack was originally heavy metal. Around the time the disco theme was considered, a member of the development staff believed the music should represent the game's fast-paced action. The soundtrack was then hurriedly changed to feature disco-inspired music tracks, though the boss battle theme retained the heavy metal sound. Feveron's music is reminiscent of music from artists such as the Bee Gees.

Dangun Feveron was released in Japan in September 1998, published by Nihon System Inc. Unlike several of Cave's other releases, the game remained exclusive to arcades and hadn't seen a contemporary port for a home console. Cave considered releasing an Xbox Live Arcade downloadable version if the digital re-release of Guwange performed well. In 2016, M2, a company regarded for its high-quality video game re-releases, published a port of Feveron for the PlayStation 4 under its M2 ShotTriggers series. This version was released internationally in 2018 with full English translations, alongside an Xbox One conversion. Both versions feature multiple enhancements, such as achievements and border graphics. The title has since been re-released on the Antstream Arcade service in December 2019. A physical edition of the PlayStation 4 version was planned to be published by Limited Run Games.

== Reception ==
Reception

Review score
Publication	Score
Famitsu	30/40

Game Machine lists Dangun Feveron among Japan's most popular arcade games in November 1998. A reviewer for Game Criticism believed that outside its colorful visuals and disco-inspired presentation, Dangun Feveron was a generic vertical shooter that felt "half-finished" in comparison to similar titles, which they believed was most noticeable in its unremarkable enemy designs and level layouts. The reviewer was also critical of the game's lack of challenge, which they believed contradicted the Fever part of the title. Takehiko Hara, who previewed the game for ITmedia, claimed the low difficulty made Dangun Feveron more accessible to beginners, as most scrolling shooters at the time were known for their immense challenge. Hara commented on its addition of a time attack mode, which was a largely unheard-of idea for arcade games.

Retrospective reviews for Dangun Feveron had identified its absurdity and fast-paced action. A PC Zone writer described it as being "a brilliant, over-the-top shooter", applauding its comical nature and addictive gameplay. Hardcore Gaming 101's Kurt Kalata agreed, and found it to be among Cave's more experimental and unusual creations. He was particularly fond of its scoring system for not adhering to the usual standards of scrolling shooters. Famitsu reviewers generally enjoyed the PlayStation 4 version of Dangun Feveron for its vibrant graphics and fast-paced gameplay. One reviewer praised the addition of extra features as it made the game seem more worthy of its price point. Another questioned its difficulty level and claimed that, even at the lowest difficulty session, it was a difficult game and likely only suitable for advanced players.
