= Fossil Fighters (video game) =

2008 video game

- North American box art
- Developers: Nintendo SPD; Red Entertainment; M2; Artdink
- Publisher: Nintendo
- Composers: Asuka Ito; Megumi Inoue; Daisuke Shiiba
- Series: Fossil Fighters
- Platform: Nintendo DS
- Release: JP: April 17, 2008; NA: August 10, 2009; AU: September 17, 2009
- Genre: Role-playing
- Modes: Single-player, Multiplayer

Fossil Fighters, known as We Are Fossil Diggers (Note: Japanese: ぼくらはカセキホリダー, Hepburn: Bokura wa Kasekihoridā) in Japan, is a 2008 role-playing video game developed by Nintendo SPD, Red Entertainment, M2, and Artdink and published by Nintendo for the Nintendo DS. It was first released in Japan on April 17, 2008, and was later released in North America on August 10, 2009, and in Australia on September 17, 2009. Gameplay centers on excavating fossils and reviving them into creatures known as "vivosaurs", which are then used in turn-based battles against other vivosaurs.

Fossil Fighters received mixed to positive reviews, with critics frequently noting similarities to the Pokémon series. It was followed by two sequels: Fossil Fighters: Champions for the DS, released in Japan in 2010 and North America in 2011, and Fossil Fighters: Frontier for the Nintendo 3DS, released in Japan in 2014 and in North America in 2015.

== Gameplay ==
Fossil Fighters is a role-playing game in which players explore excavation areas known as dig sites to locate and excavate fossil rocks containing various fossilized body parts. Once excavated, these fossils can be cleaned and revived into creatures known as "vivosaurs" for use in battle. Each vivosaur is associated with four fossil parts: head, body, arms, and legs. A vivosaur may be revived once its head fossil has been obtained and cleaned, while the remaining fossil parts provide additional statistical bonuses and improve the creature's overall effectiveness in battle. Fossils discovered before the corresponding head fossil are retained until the vivosaur can be revived.

Fossil cleaning is performed through a touchscreen minigame in which players use tools such as a hammer and drill to remove rock surrounding a fossil. The process is timed, typically allowing 90 seconds to expose as much of the fossil as possible while avoiding damage. The quality of the cleaning affects the strength of the resulting vivosaur.

Battles in Fossil Fighters are turn-based and generally involve teams of up to three vivosaurs. Combat uses a resource known as Fossil Power (FP), which is spent to perform attacks and special abilities. Victory is achieved by defeating all opposing vivosaurs. Strategic considerations include vivosaur positioning, resource management, and the use of support effects that modify combat statistics. The game employs a battlefield divided into an Attack Zone, Support Zones, and an Escape Zone. Vivosaurs positioned in Support Zones can provide bonuses to allied vivosaurs or penalties to opponents, while weakened vivosaurs may be moved to the Escape Zone to facilitate tactical repositioning.

The game also features an elemental affinity system. Vivosaurs are assigned elemental types, including Fire, Water, Air, Earth, and Neutral. Elemental matchups influence battle performance, with each primary element possessing strengths and weaknesses against another. Special Legendary-element vivosaurs function similarly to Neutral-element vivosaurs and do not possess elemental advantages or disadvantages.

== Plot ==
The player character arrives on Vivosaur Island and begins training as a Fossil Fighter after helping Rosie recover her stolen Dino Medals. During their travels across the island, they repeatedly encounter the BB Bandits, a criminal organization searching for a series of mysterious idols. After recovering several idols and exposing Vivosaur Island's police chief as the band's leader, the player defeats him and rescues Rosie from captivity. Rosie's grandfather, Mr. Richmond, concludes that the bandits were likely acting on behalf of an unknown client interested in obtaining the idols.

The player later encounters Duna, a member of the dinaurians, an extraterrestrial species. Duna reveals that the idols are components of the Idolcomp, an ancient supercomputer created by the dinaurians. The player learns that the dinaurians intend to use the completed system for "Project: Mother Planet", a plan to devolve humanity back into a basic mammalian state and recreate the dinaurians' lost homeworld on Earth. However, Duna develops sympathy for humanity and refuses to participate. During an attempt to activate the project, Dr. Diggins sabotages the process, scattering parts of the Idolcomp and delaying the plan.

As the missing components are recovered, the player learns more about the dinaurians' history. Their homeworld was destroyed by Guhnash, a godlike cosmic organism. Believing their species doomed, the dinaurians launched genetic material into space in the hope of creating a successor civilization. The Idolcomp was intended to guide this process and oversee the development of the resulting species.

After the Idolcomp is restored, King Dynal, leader of the dinaurians, resumes Project: Mother Planet. The player confronts and defeats him, convincing him that humans and dinaurians can coexist peacefully. However, the completed Idolcomp reveals that the dinaurians' efforts to seed a successor civilization on Earth failed millions of years earlier during the Cambrian Era and that humanity evolved independently. Determining that Earth's life forms represent a deviation from its original mission, the Idolcomp summons Guhnash to eradicate all life on the planet.

To stop Guhnash, the player joins forces with Dynal, Duna, Rosie, and Dr. Diggins. After discovering the creature's weakness, the player enters Guhnash and destroys the organs that control its power, causing the organism to collapse. Although Earth is saved, the player and a chosen companion are stranded during the battle's aftermath and must rely on dinaurian stone-sleep technology to survive until they can be rescued. Upon returning, the companion initially suffers lasting effects from the ordeal, but is ultimately restored, concluding the story.

== Development ==
The director Azusa Tajima and Genki Yokota from Nintendo SPD along with their entire sound staff from Nintendo worked together with Artdink, M2 and Red Entertainment in the development of Fossil Fighters. In an interview with the 4-team development group, Nintendo's Hitoshi Yamagami describes the game's conception around 2004, when Red Entertainment proposed the idea of a game involving dinosaurs.

== Reception ==
Reception

Aggregate score
Aggregator	Score
Metacritic	70/100

Review scores
Publication	Score
GameSpot	7.5/10
GamesRadar+	3/5
IGN	5.9/10
Nintendo Life	7/10
Nintendo World Report	7/10

Fossil Fighters received a score of 32 out of 40 by the Japanese magazine Famitsu. The game was the third best-selling game in Japan the week of its release at 35,000 copies sold. By the end of 2008, Fossil Fighters had sold 240,176 copies, making it the 15th best-selling DS game of the year in the region. In the United States, it sold 92,000 units in August 2009, making it the 10th bestselling game for that month.

In America, Fossil Fighters scores averaged between 7 and 8. Reviewers generally praised the game for being fun, having simple yet surprisingly addictive cleaning while having battles that were somewhat enjoyable. While most reviewers compared it to the Pokémon video game series, some reviewers like GameSpot didn't mind, saying that they might as well borrow from the best, while others didn't bring it up much. Reviewers found game elements like graphics and music overall lacking, and some reviewers, like IGN (who gave the game a 5.3), knocked the game for being repetitive and too Pokémon-like.
