= Metal Gear Solid (video game) =

1998 video game

- North American cover art
- Developer: Konami Computer Entertainment Japan (Note: Ported to Windows by Digital Dialect)
- Publisher: Konami (Note: Windows version published by Microsoft Games)
- Director: Hideo Kojima
- Producers: Hideo Kojima; Motoyuki Yoshioka
- Designer: Hideo Kojima
- Programmer: Kazunobu Uehara
- Artist: Yoji Shinkawa
- Writers: Hideo Kojima; Tomokazu Fukushima
- Composers: Kazuki Muraoka; Hiroyuki Togo; Takanari Ishiyama; Lee Jeon Myung; Gigi Meroni
- Series: Metal Gear
- Platforms: PlayStation; Windows
- Release: September 3, 1998: PlayStation; JP: September 3, 1998; NA: October 20, 1998; EU: February 22, 1999; Integral; PlayStation; JP: June 24, 1999; NA: October 12, 1999 (Note: The VR Disc from Integral was released by itself for the PlayStation as Metal Gear Solid: VR Missions in North America and as Metal Gear Solid: Special Missions in the PAL region.); EU: October 29, 1999 Windows; NA: September 22, 2000; EU: October 20, 2000
- Genres: Action-adventure, stealth
- Mode: Single-player

Metal Gear Solid (Note: Japanese: メタルギアソリッド, Hepburn: Metaru Gia Soriddo) is a 1998 action-adventure stealth game developed and published by Konami for the PlayStation. Directed, produced, and written by Hideo Kojima, the game is the third mainline installment in the Metal Gear series and serves as a sequel to the MSX2 game Metal Gear 2: Solid Snake (1990). The game's story follows Solid Snake, a former Special Forces operative who is pulled out of retirement by the U.S. government to infiltrate Shadow Moses, a nuclear weapons facility that has been taken over by rogue unit FOXHOUND, led by Liquid Snake. Solid Snake must liberate hostages and prevent FOXHOUND from using Metal Gear REX, a mecha capable of delivering a nuclear warhead anywhere in the world, while confronting his own origins.

The game is played from a top-down perspective from where Solid Snake must navigate the environment. Stealth is optional but highly encouraged, with a cover system and radar utilized to avoid sight from guards. Getting detected triggers an "Alert" mode where enemies will attempt to kill the player, and is usually deactivated if they evade guards for long enough. The player obtains various items and weapons through the game, including key cards which are used to unlock different areas of the base, typically obtained from defeating bosses.

Conceived by Kojima during the development of Policenauts (1994), Metal Gear Solid was initially developed for the 3DO Interactive Multiplayer in 1995 but was soon moved to the PlayStation. With a small team of 20 people, Kojima emphasized extreme detail, utilizing real-life demonstrations of weapons, individually-designed set pieces, and mocking environments using Lego building blocks. Artist Yoji Shinkawa designed the majority of characters, including Solid Snake, who was physically based on Jean-Claude Van Damme and Christopher Walken. Cinematic cutscenes were rendered using the in-engine graphics, and voice acting was used throughout. Metal Gear Solid was unveiled at the 1996 Tokyo Game Show and demonstrated at trade shows including the 1997 Electronic Entertainment Expo, to largely positive reception.

Upon release, Metal Gear Solid received unanimous acclaim, with critics lauding the cinematic presentation of the game, narrative, gameplay, and stealth mechanics. Regarded as one of the greatest and most influential video games ever made, it is often considered the founding father of the stealth game genre, one of the best PlayStation games, and credited with popularizing cinematic style in video games. Despite low expectations, Metal Gear Solid was also commercially successful, selling more than seven million copies worldwide and establishing the Metal Gear series as a cultural icon. Extended VR Missions and an expanded version, Metal Gear Solid: Integral, were released in 1999 and 2000 for the PlayStation and Windows. Both the game and its expansions were re-released on the PlayStation Network for PlayStation 3 and PlayStation Portable, as well as in the compilations Metal Gear Solid: The Legacy Collection (2013) and Metal Gear Solid: Master Collection Vol. 1 (2023) for various platforms. A direct sequel, Metal Gear Solid 2: Sons of Liberty, was released for the PlayStation 2 in 2001. A remake, Metal Gear Solid: The Twin Snakes, was released for the GameCube in 2004.

== Gameplay ==
Solid Snake hiding from a guard, behind an M1 Abrams main battle tank. When Snake leans on a corner, the camera shifts to his front for dramatic effect and to enable sight down corridors.

Representation of the game's 'Soliton Radar' feature. The white dot visual cone represents the player character, while red-dot visual cones represent enemy guards. Green outlines indicate objects or walls the player can hide behind.

The player must navigate the protagonist, Solid Snake, through a nuclear weapons facility without being detected by enemies. When Snake moves into an enemy's field of vision, he sets off an "alert mode" that draws enemies. The player must then hide until "evasion mode" begins; when the counter reaches zero, the game returns to "infiltration mode", where enemies are no longer suspicious. The radar cannot be used in alert or evasion mode. In addition to the stealth gameplay, set-piece sequences entail firefights between the player and enemies.

To remain undetected, the player can perform techniques that make use of Snake's abilities and the environment, such as crawling under objects, using boxes as cover, ducking or hiding around walls, and making noise to distract enemies. An on-screen radar provides the player with the location of nearby enemies and their field of vision. Snake can also make use of many items and gadgets, such as infra-red goggles and a cardboard box disguise. The emphasis on stealth promotes a less violent form of gameplay, as fights against large groups of enemies will often result in severe damage to Snake.

Despite the switch to 3D, the game is still played primarily from an overhead perspective similar to the original 2D Metal Gear games. However, the camera angle will change during certain situations, such as a corner view when Snake flattens himself to a wall next to an open space, or into first-person when crawling under tight spaces or when equipping certain items such as the binoculars or a sniper rifle. The player can also use the first-person view while remaining idle to look around Snake's surroundings and see what is ahead of him.

Progress is punctuated by cutscenes and radio conversations, as well as encounters with bosses. To progress, players must discover the weaknesses of each boss and defeat them, which usually yields a key card that is used to unlock different areas of the base and progress. Play controls and strategies can also be accessed via the Codec, a radio communication device where advice is delivered from Snake's support team; for example, the support team may chastise Snake for not saving his progress often enough, or explain his combat moves in terms of which buttons to press on the gamepad. The Codec is also used to provide exposition on the game's backstory.

In addition to the main story, there is also a VR training mode in which the player can test out their sneaking skills in a series of artificially constructed environments. This mode is divided into three main categories (practice, time attack, and gun shooting), each consisting of ten stages. After completing all 30 stages, a survival mission is unlocked in which the player must sneak their way through ten consecutive stages under a seven-minute limit.

== Synopsis ==
=== Setting ===
Metal Gear Solid takes place in an alternate history in which the Cold War continued into the 1990s, ending at some point near the end of the 20th century. The game takes place in 2005, six years after the events of Metal Gear 2: Solid Snake, and form the third chapter in an overarching plot concerning the character of Solid Snake.

=== Characters ===
The protagonist is Solid Snake (Akio Otsuka/David Hayter), a legendary infiltrator and saboteur. During the mission, Snake receives support and advice via codec radio. Colonel Roy Campbell, Solid Snake's former commanding officer, supports Snake with information and tactics. While he initially keeps some secrets from Snake, he gradually reveals them. He is joined by Naomi Hunter, who gives medical advice; Nastasha Romanenko, who provides item and weapon tips; Master Miller, a former drill instructor and survival coach; and Mei Ling, who invented the Soliton radar system used in the mission and is also in charge of mission data; the player can call her to save the game.

The main antagonist of the game is Liquid Snake, leader of a now-terrorist splinter cell of the organization FOXHOUND, and genetic counterpart to Solid Snake. An elite special forces unit, FOXHOUND contains experts specializing in different tasks. Members are Revolver Ocelot, a Western-style gunslinger and expert interrogator whose weapon of choice is the Colt Single Action Army; Sniper Wolf, a preternatural sniper; Vulcan Raven, a hulking Alaskan shaman armed with an M61 Vulcan torn from a downed F-16; Psycho Mantis, a psychic profiler and psychokinesis expert; and Decoy Octopus, a master of disguise.

Other characters include Meryl Silverburgh, Colonel Campbell's niece and a rookie soldier stationed in Shadow Moses who did not join the revolt; Dr. Hal Emmerich, the lead developer of Metal Gear REX; and Gray Fox, also known as the "Ninja", a mysterious cybernetically enhanced agent who is neither an ally nor an enemy of Snake but does oppose FOXHOUND.

=== Plot ===
Snake engaging Metal Gear REX

In 2005, renegade genetically enhanced special forces unit FOXHOUND seizes control of a remote island in Alaska's Fox Archipelago codenamed "Shadow Moses", which houses a nuclear weapons disposal facility. FOXHOUND threatens to use the nuclear-capable mecha Metal Gear REX, being secretly tested at the facility, against the US government, if they do not receive the remains of Big Boss and a ransom of $1 billion within 24 hours. Snake must liberate hostages and stop the terrorists from launching a nuclear strike. Solid Snake is forced out of retirement by Colonel Roy Campbell to infiltrate the island and neutralize the threat.

Snake enters the facility via an air vent and locates the first hostage, DARPA Chief Donald Anderson. Anderson reveals that Metal Gear REX can be deactivated with a secret detonation override code, but dies of a heart attack. Colonel Campbell's niece Meryl Silverburgh, held hostage in a neighboring cell, helps Snake escape. Snake locates another hostage, ArmsTech president Kenneth Baker, but is confronted by FOXHOUND member Revolver Ocelot. Their gunfight is interrupted by a mysterious cyborg ninja who cuts off Ocelot's right hand. Baker briefs Snake on the Metal Gear project and advises him to contact Meryl, whom he gave a PAL card that might prevent the launch, but he too dies of a sudden heart attack.

Over Codec, Meryl agrees to meet in the warhead disposal area on the condition that Snake contacts Metal Gear's designer, Dr. Hal "Otacon" Emmerich. En route, Snake receives an anonymous codec call from someone calling themselves "Deepthroat", warning him of a tank ambush. Snake fends off the attack from Vulcan Raven and proceeds to the rendezvous, where he locates Otacon. The ninja reappears, and Snake realizes it is his former ally Gray Fox, believed dead. Devastated over learning REX's true intentions, Otacon agrees to aid Snake remotely using special camouflage to procure information and supplies.

Snake meets Meryl and receives the PAL card. As they head for the underground base, Meryl is possessed by psychic Psycho Mantis and pulls her gun on Snake. He disarms her and defeats Mantis, who informs Snake that he has "a large place" in her heart. After they reach the underground passageway, Sniper Wolf ambushes them, wounds Meryl, and captures Snake. Liquid confirms Snake's suspicion that they are twin brothers. After being tortured by Ocelot, Snake is confused to discover Anderson's body in his cell, seemingly dead for days. He escapes with the help of Otacon, makes his way up the communications tower, and fends off a Hind D helicopter attack from Liquid. As he emerges onto a snowfield, he is confronted again by Sniper Wolf. He kills her, devastating Otacon, who was infatuated with her due to Stockholm syndrome.

Snake continues to REX's hangar and is ambushed again by Raven. After Snake defeats him, Raven tells Snake that the "Anderson" he conversed with was, in fact, FOXHOUND disguise artist Decoy Octopus. Infiltrating Metal Gear's hangar, Snake overhears Liquid and Ocelot preparing the REX launch sequence and uses the PAL card, but this unexpectedly activates REX. Liquid reveals that he has been impersonating Snake's advisor Master Miller and that FOXHOUND has used Snake to facilitate REX's launch. He and Snake are the product of the Les Enfants Terribles project, a 1970s government program to clone Big Boss. He also reveals to Snake the government's true reason for sending him: Snake is unknowingly carrying a weaponized "FOXDIE" virus that causes cardiac arrest in FOXHOUND members on contact, allowing the government to retrieve REX undamaged.

As Liquid, in REX, battles Snake, Gray Fox appears. He reveals to Snake that he was Deepthroat, destroys REX's radome, and is crushed to death by REX. Snake destroys REX and defeats Liquid, then escapes with Meryl or Otacon (Note: Snake escapes with Meryl or Otacon depending on whether the player submitted to Ocelot's torture. The story's canon ending states Snake escaped with Meryl.) via a tunnel, pursued by Liquid in a jeep. After their vehicles crash, Liquid pulls a gun on an incapacitated Snake but dies from FOXDIE. Colonel Campbell, briefly ousted from command, calls off a nuclear strike to destroy evidence of the operation and has Snake registered as killed in action to stop the US government searching for him. Naomi Hunter, who injected Snake with the FOXDIE virus, tells him that he has an indeterminate amount of time before it kills him. Ocelot calls the US President; he was a double agent whose mission was to steal Baker's disk of Metal Gear specifications, and identifies the President as being Solidus Snake, the secret third clone of Big Boss.

== Development ==
Director Hideo Kojima originally planned his third Metal Gear game in 1994 for the 3DO Interactive Multiplayer. Kojima was initially planning Metal Gear Solid while Policenauts (1994), an adventure game, was still in development. Conceptual artwork by Yoji Shinkawa of the characters Solid Snake, Meryl Silverburgh, who was also a character in Policenauts, and the FOXHOUND team, were included in the Policenauts: Pilot Disk preceding the release of the full 3DO version of Policenauts in 1995.

The game was titled Metal Gear Solid, rather than Metal Gear 3, as Kojima felt that the previous MSX2 games that he worked on were not widely known, due to the fact that they were not released in North America and only the first one was released in Europe (an NES version of the first Metal Gear was released in North America, but Kojima had no involvement with it or its sequel Snake's Revenge). The word "Solid," derived from the codename of series's protagonist Solid Snake (as well as the title of the second MSX2 game), was chosen not only to represent the fact that it was the third entry of the series, but also the transition from 2D to 3D computer graphics.

Considering first person games difficult to control, the team opted to give the gameplay a 2D style by having it predominantly played from an overhead angle, while using 3D graphics and the ability to switch to first person on the fly to make it feel as though the game were taking place in a real 3D world.

Development for Metal Gear Solid began in 1995, but was briefly halted due to the Great Hanshin earthquake which caused major damage to the development studio. When development of Metal Gear Solid resumed, it was moved over to the PlayStation platform. Developers aimed for accuracy and realism while making the game enjoyable and tense. In the early stages of development, the Huntington Beach SWAT team educated the creators with a demonstration of vehicles, weapons, and explosives. Weapons expert Motosada Mori was also tapped as a technical adviser in the research, which included visits to Fort Irwin and firing sessions at Stembridge Gun Rentals. Kojima stated that "if the player isn't tricked into believing that the world is real, then there's no point in making the game." To fulfill this, adjustments were made to every detail, such as individually designed desks.

The characters and mecha designs were made by artist Yoji Shinkawa based on Kojima's concepts. When designing props and hardware, he first built plastic models at home, and then drew the final designs from the models. According to Shinkawa, Solid Snake's physique in this particular installment was based on Jean-Claude Van Damme, while his facial appearance was based on Christopher Walken. Konami had decided that the middle-aged appearance of Snake in the previous games did not have good commercial appeal, and opted to redesign him so that he would look younger. The characters were completed by polygonal artists using brush drawings and clay models by Shinkawa. According to Kojima, "the ninja's cloaking effect is the result of a bug. Of course, it wasn't totally coincidence since we wanted that effect anyway, but we did get a somewhat unexpected result." Kojima wanted greater interaction with objects and the environment, such as allowing the player to hide bodies in a storage compartment. Additionally, he wanted "a full orchestra right next to the player"; a system which made modifications such as tempo and texture to the currently playing track, instead of switching to another pre-recorded track. Although these features could not be achieved, they were implemented in Metal Gear Solid 2: Sons of Liberty.

Kojima used Lego building blocks and toy figurines to model 3D areas and see what the planned camera views would look like. The game was developed by a staff of twenty people, a small team for such a major title. Kojima preferred to have a smaller team so that he got to know everyone in the team and what they were working on, and could know if anyone was sick or unhappy. The team size did not expand to full strength until September 1996; initially, there was only a single programmer working on the game's code.

Because the developers wanted the game's action to be stylized and movie-like rather than realistic, they opted not to use motion capture, instead having an artist with experience in anime design the animations by hand.

A gameplay demo of Metal Gear Solid was first revealed to the public at the 1996 Tokyo Game Show and was later shown at E3 1997 as a short video. The 1997 version had several differences, including a more controllable camera and blue-colored vision cones. The demo generated significant buzz and positive reviews at the event, for its game design emphasizing stealth and strategy (like earlier Metal Gear games), its presentation, and the unprecedented level of real-time 3D graphical detail for the PlayStation. The enthusiastic response to the game at E3 took Kojima by surprise, and increased his expectations for the game's performance in the American market. The game's Japanese release was originally planned for late 1997, but was delayed to 1998.

It was playable for the first time at the Tokyo Game Show in 1998 and released the same year in Japan with an extensive promotional campaign. The game, which took two years to develop, had a production budget of £10 million or $17,000,000 (equivalent to $34,000,000 in 2025). Television and magazine advertisements, in-store samples, and demo giveaways contributed to a total of $8,000,000 (equivalent to $16,000,000 in 2025) in promotional costs.

=== Voice acting ===
Except for David Hayter (Solid Snake) and Doug Stone (Psycho Mantis), the English voice cast was credited with pseudonyms. Reportedly, this was done because the Screen Actors Guild's rules at the time were unclear regarding performances for video games. When the actors returned for the 2004 remake Metal Gear Solid: The Twin Snakes, they were credited with their real names.

=== Music ===
"Metal Gear Solid Main Theme"
30-second sample from the main theme of Metal Gear Solid, composed by TAPPY.

The musical score of Metal Gear Solid was composed by Konami's in-house musicians, including Kazuki Muraoka, Hiroyuki Togo, Takanari Ishiyama, Lee Jeon Myung, and Maki Kirioka. Composer and lyricist Rika Muranaka provided a song called "The Best is Yet To Come" for the game's ending credits sequence. The song is performed in Irish by Aoife Ní Fhearraigh. The main theme was composed by Tappi Iwase from the Konami Kukeiha Club.

Music played in-game has a synthetic feel with increased pace and introduction of strings during tense moments, with a looping style endemic to video games. Overtly cinematic music, with stronger orchestral and choral elements, appears in cutscenes. The soundtrack was released on September 23, 1998, under the King Records label.

== Release ==
Metal Gear Solid was first released for the PlayStation in Japan on September 3, 1998. The game was available in a standard edition, as well as a limited "Premium Package" edition sold in a large box that also contained a t-shirt, a pair of FOXHOUND-themed dog tags, memory card stickers, an audio CD featuring the soundtracks from the MSX2 Metal Gear games (including a few bonus arranged tracks), and a 40-page booklet, Metal Gear Solid Classified, featuring production notes, interviews with the developers, and a glossary of terminology in the game.

The North American version was released a month later on October 20. Changes and additions were made to this version, such as a choice of three difficulty settings when starting a new game (with a fourth setting that is unlocked after completing the game once), an alternate tuxedo outfit for Snake (which the character wears on every third playthrough on the same save file), and a "demo theater" mode where the player views every cutscene and radio conversations relevant to the main story. Jeremy Blaustein, who previously worked on the English localization of Snatcher for the Sega CD, wrote the English version of the script. One change in the English script was the addition of Western sources and authors to Mei-Ling's pool of motivational quotes; originally the character only cited Chinese proverbs natively, providing an explanation afterward in Japanese, but this proved challenging to adapt during the translation. The games detected by Psycho Mantis when he reads the player's memory card were also changed, due to certain games (such as the Tokimeki Memorial series) not being released outside Japan. This resulted in Kojima's cameo (in which he thanks the player for supporting his work via a voiceover) being cut from the Western versions, as save data from two PlayStation games not available outside Japan, Snatcher and Policenauts, needed to be present on the player's memory card for this Easter egg to appear.

The game was launched in Europe on February 22, 1999, with versions voiced in French, Italian, and German available in addition to English. A Spanish dubbed version was later released on May 1. Like in Japan, a limited edition of the game was released, although the contents of the European limited edition differs from the Japanese counterpart. The European Premium Package comes with the game software itself and its soundtrack album CD, along with a t-shirt, dog tags, memory card stickers, a double sided movie-style poster and a set of postcards.

The Japanese PlayStation version of Metal Gear Solid was reissued twice: once under "The Best" series and later under "PS one Books." Likewise, the American and European versions of Metal Gear Solid were reissued under the "Greatest Hits" and "Platinum" series respectively. For the 20th anniversary of the original Metal Gear in 2007, the original Metal Gear Solid was re-released in Japan as a stand-alone 20th anniversary-themed edition, as well as in the included in the 20th anniversary Metal Gear Solid Collection set, while in North America it was bundled in the Metal Gear Solid: Essential Collection set. The original Metal Gear Solid was released on the PlayStation Store for download on the PlayStation 3 and PlayStation Portable on March 21, 2008, in Japan and on June 18, 2009, in North America and on November 19 of the same year in Europe.

Metal Gear Solid is one of the twenty PlayStation games included in the PlayStation Classic released in 2018. The game is included in both the Japanese and western models of the unit in their respective versions.

=== Integral ===
Released on June 25, 1999, for the PlayStation in Japan, Metal Gear Solid: Integral (Note: メタルギアソリッド インテグラル, Metaru Gia Soriddo: Integuraru) is an expanded edition of the game that features the added content from the American and European versions. It replaces the Japanese voices from the original version with the English dub, offering players a choice between Japanese and English subtitles during cutscenes and CODEC conversations (item descriptions, mission logs, and other text are still in Japanese). Further additional content to the main game include an alternate "sneaking suit" outfit for Meryl (which she wears when Snake is dressed in the tuxedo), a "Very Easy" difficulty setting where the player starts the mission armed with a suppressor-equipped MP5 submachine gun with infinite ammo (substituting the FAMAS rifle in Snake's inventory), an eighth Codec frequency featuring commentary from the development team (unvoiced and in Japanese text only) on every area and boss encounter, hidden music tracks, an alternate game mode where the player controls Snake from a first-person perspective (on Normal difficulty only), an option for alternative patrol routes for enemies, and a downloadable PocketStation minigame. The Torture Event was also made easier, reducing the number of rounds to three per session on all five difficulty settings.

The VR training mode is now stored on a separate third disc, known as the "VR Disc", and has been expanded into 300 missions. These new set of missions are divided into four main categories: Sneaking, Weapons, Advanced, and Special. The first three categories feature standard training exercises that test the player's sneaking, shooting, and combat skills, while the fourth category contains less conventional tests involving murder mysteries, giant genome soldiers, and flying saucers. One particular set of missions has the player controlling the Cyborg Ninja, unlocked by either completing a minigame on the PocketStation and uploading the data to the VR Disc or by achieving the Fox rank on the main game. Completing all 300 missions will unlock a concept artwork of Metal Gear RAY, a mech that would later appear in Metal Gear Solid 2: Sons of Liberty. Additional content includes preview trailers of Metal Gear Solid from trade events and a photoshoot mode where the player can take photographs of fully expressive polygonal models of Mei Ling and Dr. Naomi after completing the main game. Famitsu magazine rated Metal Gear Solid: Integral a 34 out of 40.

The VR Disc from Integral was released by itself during the same year in other regions as Metal Gear Solid: VR Missions in North America on September 23 and as Metal Gear Solid: Special Missions in the PAL region on October 29. While the content of both, VR Missions and Special Missions, are virtually identical to the VR Disc, the unlocking requirements for the Ninja missions and the photoshoot mode were changed accordingly, so that save data from the main game was no longer required. The Special Missions version also adds an additional requirement in which the user must also own a copy of the original Metal Gear Solid in PAL format in order to start the game – after booting Special Missions on the console, the player will be asked to switch the disc with the first disc from Metal Gear Solid to load data before asking the player to switch back to the Special Missions disc to proceed through the rest of the game.

=== Windows version ===
The Windows version of Metal Gear Solid was released in North America on September 22, 2000, in the United Kingdom on October 20, 2000, and in other European and Asian territories (excluding Japan) in late 2000. This version was published by Microsoft Games and developed by Digital Dialect. It supports the use of a keyboard or a USB game controller with at least six buttons (with the manual recommending the Sidewinder Game Pad Pro). It also supports Direct3D-capable video cards, allowing for a high resolution of up to 1024x768. The Windows version is labeled Metal Gear Solid on the packaging, but the actual game uses the Metal Gear Solid: Integral logo, although it has some differences as well from the PlayStation version of Integral and lacks some of its content. The most significant change was reducing the number of discs from three to two, which was done by giving each disc two separate executable files, one for the main game (mgsi.exe) and the other for the VR training portion (mgsvr.exe), thus eliminating the need for a stand-alone third disc.

One notable omission was the removal of the cutscene before the Psycho Mantis battle in which he reads the player's memory card and activates the vibration function of the player's controller if a DualShock is being used, as this scene involved the use of PlayStation-specific peripherals. The method for defeating Mantis was also changed from using the second controller to simply using the keyboard (regardless of whether the player was using a game controller or not up to that point). Other omissions include the removal of the eighth Codec frequency (140.07), which featured written commentaries by the developers, Meryl's alternate sneaking suit outfit, and the mission logs when loading a save file. However, the Windows version adds the option to toggle moving and shooting in first-person view mode at any time regardless of difficulty setting, and players can now save their progress at any point without contacting Mei-Ling through the use of quicksaves. On the VR training portion, all 300 missions, as well as the photoshoot mode, are available from the start, although the opening video and the three unlockable preview trailers from the PlayStation version have been removed.

Scoring 83 on Metacritic's aggregate, the game was criticized for "graphic glitches," the aged nature of the port, and being virtually identical to the PlayStation version.

=== The Twin Snakes ===
A remake, Metal Gear Solid: The Twin Snakes, was developed by Silicon Knights under the supervision of KCE Japan and released for the GameCube in North America, Japan, and Europe in March 2004. Although Twin Snakes was primarily developed at Silicon Knights, its cutscenes were developed in-house at Konami and directed by Japanese film director Ryuhei Kitamura, reflecting his dynamic signature style, utilizing bullet time photography and choreographed gunplay extensively. While the storyline and settings of the game were unchanged (although a select few lines of dialog were re-written more closely resembling the original Japanese version), a variety of gameplay features from Sons of Liberty were added such as the first-person aiming and hanging from bars on walls. Another change in the English voice acting was the reduction of Mei Ling's, Naomi's and Nastasha's accents, as well as the recasting of Gray Fox from Greg Eagles, who still reprises the role of the DARPA chief, to Rob Paulsen. The graphics and play mechanics were also updated to match those of Metal Gear Solid 2.

=== Master Collection version ===
The original version of Metal Gear Solid was re-released in October 2023 for PlayStation 4, PlayStation 5, Xbox Series X/S, Nintendo Switch and Windows (via Steam) as part of a series of re-releases titled the Metal Gear Solid: Master Collection. The title is available as stand-alone download with the original Metal Gear and Metal Gear 2: Solid Snake included as bonuses, with all three titles also included as part of a compilation titled Metal Gear Solid: Master Collection Vol.1 along with re-releases of Metal Gear Solid 2 and Metal Gear Solid 3 (both available as separate downloads as well).

In the Master Collection, the game runs on an emulator developed by M2, with the option to play any of the seven regional versions (Japanese, North American, European English, German, French, Italian and Spanish) of the game via additional downloads, as well as the Integral/VR Missions/Special Missions expansions. The Master Collection edition handles the Psycho Mantis' mind reading event by giving the player option to create a virtual memory card with save files from supported games in order to trigger specific lines of dialogue. There's also a new animated sequence when the player reaches the blast furnace which visually depicts the disc-swapping process.

== Related media ==
A Japanese radio drama version of Metal Gear Solid, directed by Shuyo Murata and written by Motosada Mori, was produced shortly after the release of the original PlayStation game. 12 episodes were aired, from 1998 to 1999 on Konami's CLUB db program. The series was later released on CD as a two-volume series titled Drama CD Metal Gear Solid. Set after the events of the PlayStation game, Snake, Meryl, Campbell and Mei Ling (all portrayed by their original Japanese voice actors) pursue missions in hostile third world nations as FOXHOUND. The new characters introduced include Sgt. Allen Iishiba (voiced by Toshio Furukawa), a Delta Force operative who assists Snake and Meryl, Col. Mark Cortez (v.b. Osamu Saka), an old friend of Campbell who commands the fictional Esteria Army Special Forces, and Capt. Sergei Ivanovich (v.b. Kazuhiro Nakata), a former war buddy of Revolver Ocelot from his SVR days.

In September 2004, IDW Publications began publishing a series of Metal Gear Solid comics, written by Kris Oprisko and illustrated by Ashley Wood. The comic was published bimonthly until 2006, lasting 12 issues fully covering the Metal Gear Solid storyline. The comic was adapted into a PlayStation Portable game, Metal Gear Solid: Digital Graphic Novel (Metal Gear Solid: Bande Dessinée in Japan). It features visual enhancements and two interactive modes designed to give further insight into the publication. Upon viewing the pages, the player can open a "scanning" interface to search for characters and items in a three-dimensional view. Discoveries are added to a database which can be traded with other players via Wi-Fi. The "mission mode" allows the player to add collected information into a library. This information must be properly connected to complete a mission. Metal Gear Solid: Digital Graphic Novel was released in North America on June 13, 2006, Japan on September 21 and the PAL region on September 22. In 2006, the game received IGN's award for Best Use of Sound on the PSP. A DVD-Video version is included with its sequel (Metal Gear Solid 2: Bande Dessinée), which was released in Japan on June 12, 2008. The DVD version features full voice acting.

A novelization based on the original Metal Gear Solid was written by Raymond Benson and published by Del Rey. The American paperback edition was published on May 27, 2008, and the British Edition on June 5, 2008.

A second novelization by Kenji Yano (written under the pen name Hitori Nojima), Metal Gear Solid Substance I, was published by Kadokawa Shoten in Japan on August 25, 2015. This novelization is narrated through a text file written by a young man living in Manhattan in 2009 (the present year of the Plant chapter in Metal Gear Solid 2: Sons of Liberty). The story also acknowledges certain plot elements from Metal Gear Solid V: The Phantom Pain regarding certain characters such as Liquid Snake and Psycho Mantis.

== Reception ==
Reception

Aggregate score
Aggregator	Score
Metacritic	94/100 (PS); 83/100 (PC)

Review scores
Publication	Score
AllGame	5/5
Computer and Video Games	5/5; 9/10
Edge	9/10
Electronic Gaming Monthly	40/40
Famitsu	37/40
GamePro	5/5
GameRevolution	A−
GameSpot	8.5/10
Hyper	93%
IGN	9.8/10
Next Generation	5/5
PlayStation Official Magazine – UK	10/10
Official U.S. PlayStation Magazine	10/10
Arcade	5/5
GMR	10/10

Awards
Publication	Award
Japan Media Arts Festival	Excellence Award for Interactive Art
Electronic Gaming Monthly (Editors' Choice)	Game of the Year (Runner‑Up), PlayStation Game of the Year, Adventure Game of the Year, Best Sound Effects, Best Graphics
Electronic Gaming Monthly (Readers' Choice)	Game of the Year (Runner‑Up), PlayStation Game of the Year, Adventure Game of the Year, Best Sound Effects, Best Music (Runner-Up), Best Graphics (Runner‑Up)
Official U.S. PlayStation Magazine (1998 OPM Editors' Awards)	Best Game of '98, Best Adventure Game, Best Sound, Best Graphics (Runner-Up), Best Story (Runner-Up)
Hyper	Best Action/Adventure
Academy of Interactive Arts & Sciences (2nd Annual Interactive Achievement Awards)	Game of the Year (Nominated), Console Game of the Year (Nominated), Console Action Game of the Year (Nominated), Outstanding Achievement in Interactive Design (Nominated), Outstanding Achievement in Software Engineering (Nominated), Outstanding Achievement in Character or Story Development (Nominated)

Prior to release, the game's demonstrations at several trade shows between 1996 and 1998 had received a positive response. This had generated significant worldwide interest in the game prior to its release in 1998.

=== Critical reception ===
Metal Gear Solid received "universal acclaim", according to review aggregator website Metacritic.

PlayStation Official Magazine – UK review called Metal Gear Solid "the best game ever made. Unputdownable and unforgettable". The review by IGN opined Metal Gear Solid came "closer to perfection than any other game in PlayStation's action genre" and called it "beautiful, engrossing, and innovative...in every conceivable category." Computer and Video Games compared it to "playing a big budget action blockbuster, only better." Arcade magazine praised it for "introducing a brand new genre: the sneak-'em-up" and said it would "herald a tidal wave" of "sneak-'em-ups." They called it a "brilliant, technically stunning, well thought through release that's sure to influence action adventure games for many years." GMR called it a "cinematic classic."

GamePro called it "this season's top offering [game] and one game no self-respecting gamer should be without," but criticized the frame rate that "occasionally stalls the eye-catching graphics." GameSpot was critical of how easy it is for the player to avoid being seen, as well as the game's short length, calling it "more of a work of art than ... an actual game."

Next Generation reviewed the PlayStation version of the game, rating it five stars out of five, and stated that "rest assured that this is a game no player should miss and the best reason yet to own a PlayStation."

Metal Gear Solid received an Excellence Award for Interactive Art at the 1998 Japan Media Arts Festival. During the 2nd Annual Interactive Achievement Awards, the Academy of Interactive Arts & Sciences nominated Metal Gear Solid for "Game of the Year", "Console Game of the Year", "Console Action Game of the Year", and outstanding achievement in "Interactive Design", "Software Engineering", and "Character or Story Development".

In 1999, Next Generation listed Metal Gear Solid as number 27 on their "Top 50 Games of All Time", commenting that, "MGS is one of the most vibrant efforts in gaming history to bring serious ideas to games."

=== Sales ===
Prior to its North American release, an estimated 12 million demos for the game were distributed in 1998. Upon release, the game was a commercial success. It was the best-selling home console video game in the United States in its first month of release, became one of the most rented games in the territory, and topped sales charts in the United Kingdom and Japan. PC Data, which tracked sales in the United States, reported that Metal Gear Solid sold 1.06 million copies and earned $51,834,077 (equivalent to $102,388,000 in 2025) in revenue during 1998 alone. This made it the country's fifth-best-selling PlayStation release of 1998, and the third highest-grossing PlayStation title that year.

In the United Kingdom, it was one of the top three best-selling video games of 1999, with about 400,000 copies sold that year. In Germany, it received a Platinum award from the Verband der Unterhaltungssoftware Deutschland (VUD) in June 1999 for sales above 200,000 copies within several months, and it became the year's second best-selling PlayStation game. In Europe, the game grossed €40,034,122 or $42,668,367 (equivalent to $82,464,333 in 2025) in 1999, adding up to more than $94,502,444 (equivalent to $186,670,303 in 2025) grossed in the United States and Europe by 1999.

By early 2001, it had sold 6 million units worldwide, including 1 million units in Japan and approximately 5 million units in the United States and Europe. It went on to sell more than 6.6 million units worldwide by 2002. By 2004, the original release had sold 5.51 million and Integral had sold 1.27 million for a combined 6.78 million units worldwide. As of July 2009, the game had sold over seven million units worldwide. In the US, 2.81 million units were sold as of 2007.

Despite its high success even in sales, Kojima, during an interview with Geoff Keighley in 2014, revealed that Metal Gear Solid sales expectations were low and said: "Neither I nor anyone else expected Metal Gear Solid to sell at all. [...] I didn't think at all of how to make this game sell well, because I didn't expect it to sell."

== Legacy ==
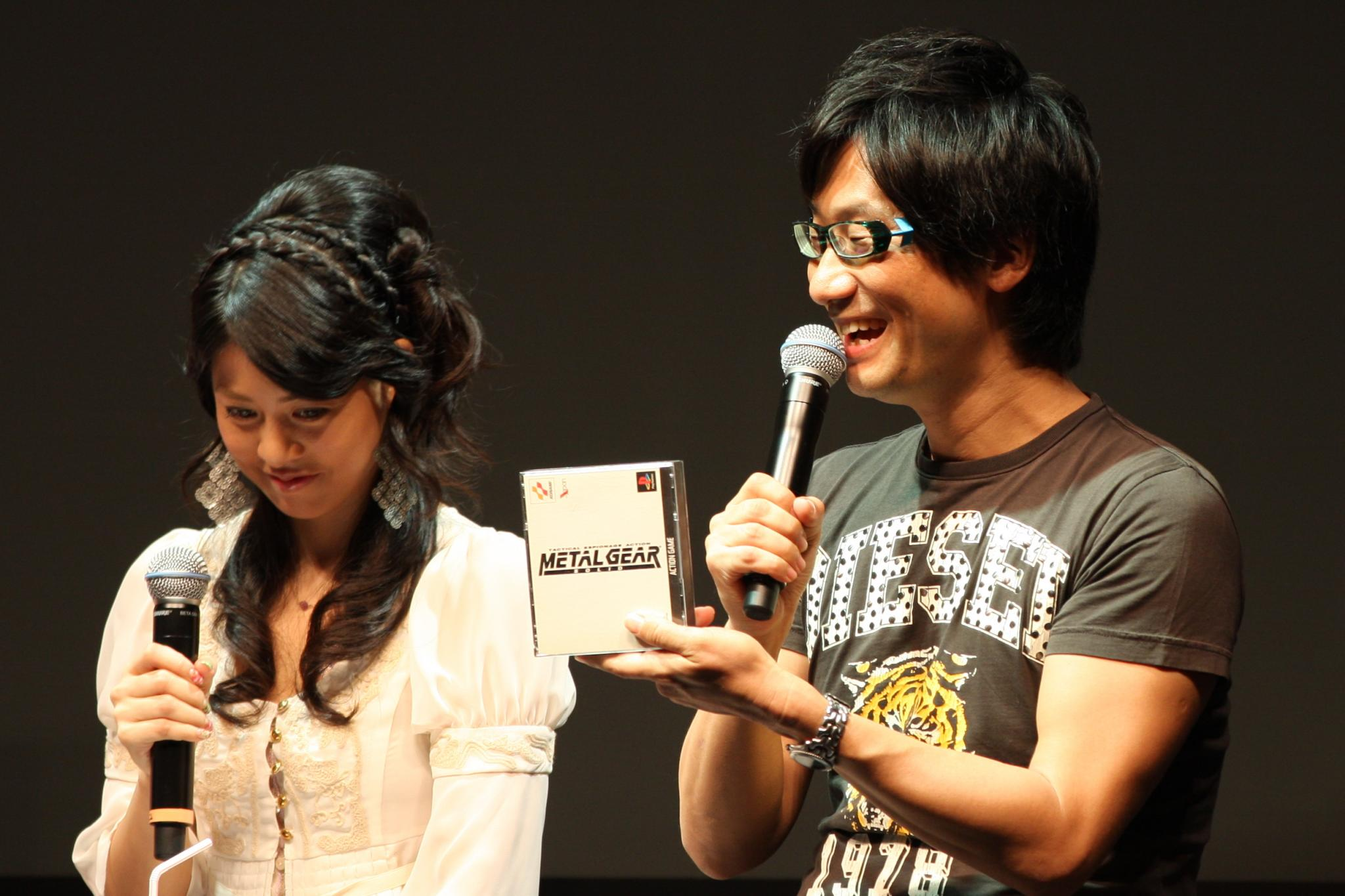
Hideo Kojima (with model Yumi Kikuchi) at the 2011 Tokyo Game Show holding an original Metal Gear Solid jewel case

Metal Gear Solid is credited with popularizing the stealth game genre. The idea of the player being unarmed and having to avoid being seen by enemies rather than fight them has been used in many games since. It is also sometimes acclaimed as being a film as much as a game due to the lengthy cutscenes and complicated storyline. IGN called it "the founder of the stealth genre."

The game is often considered one of the best games for the PlayStation and was featured in best video games lists by Computer and Video Games in 2000, by Electronic Gaming Monthly and Game Informer in 2001, by Retro Gamer in 2004, by GameFAQs and GamePro in 2005, and by Famitsu. Hyper magazine in 2001 called it "Probably the single best game on the PlayStation."

In 2002, IGN ranked it as the best PlayStation game ever, stating that just the demo for the game had "more gameplay [in it] than in most finished titles." IGN also gave it the "Best Ending" and "Best Villain" awards. In 2005, in placing it 19th on their list of "Top 100 Games", they said that it was "a game that truly felt like a movie." Guinness World Records awarded Metal Gear Solid with a record for the "Most Innovative Use of a Video Game Controller" for the boss fight with Psycho Mantis in the Guinness World Records Gamer's Edition 2008 edition. In 2010, PC Magazine ranked it as seventh in the list of most influential video games of all time, citing its influence on "such stealthy titles as Assassin's Creed and Splinter Cell." In 2012, Time named it one of the 100 greatest video games of all time and G4tv ranked it as the 45th top video game of all time.

According to 1UP.com, Metal Gear Solid's cinematic style continues to influence modern action games such as Call of Duty. Metal Gear Solid, along with its sequel, Metal Gear Solid 2, was featured in the Smithsonian American Art Museum's exhibition The Art of Video Games in 2012. During August 2015, Eurogamer reanalyzed the game's technical and overall impact and claimed that Metal Gear Solid had been nothing less than "the first modern video game." In September 2015, Metal Gear Solid was voted the best original PlayStation game of all time by PlayStation.Blog's users. In May 2023, GQ listed Metal Gear Solid as the seventh best video game of all time according to a team of video game journalists across the industry.
