= Metal Gear Solid: Master Collection =

Metal Gear video game compilation

- Logo of the collections
- Developers: Konami (Note: Metal Gear (MSX), Metal Gear (Famicom/NES), Snake's Revenge, Metal Gear 2: Solid Snake, MGS1, MGS2 and MGS3 originally developed by Konami Computer Entertainment Japan (KCEJ). MGS4 and MGS: PW originally developed by Kojima Productions. Metal Gear: Ghost Babel originally co-developed by Tose. Porting of MGS4 and MGS: PW 'HD Edition' conversion originally developed by Genki was led by Konami Digital Entertainment (Vol. 2)); Rocket Studio (Note: Porting of MGS2 and MGS3 'HD Edition' conversions originally developed by Bluepoint Games within Vol. 1 and Peace Walker 'HD Edition' conversion within Vol. 2.); M2 (Note: Emulation of Metal Gear (NES), Snake's Revenge, Metal Gear Solid and Metal Gear Solid: VR Missions in Vol. 1 only and additional development for MGS4 port in Vol. 2.); Virtuos (Note: Additional development for MGS4 port in Vol. 2.) logicalbeat (Note: Additional development in porting MGS4 Database within Vol. 2.)
- Publisher: Konami
- Producer: Noriaki Okamura
- Series: Metal Gear
- Engine: Unity (Launcher portal only); Unreal Engine 5 (Vol. 2 Metal Gear Solid 4 Database)
- Platforms: PlayStation 4 (Vol. 1); PlayStation 5; Windows; Xbox Series X/S; Nintendo Switch; Nintendo Switch 2 (Vol. 2)
- Release: Vol. 1 October 24, 2023; Vol. 2 August 27, 2026
- Genres: Action-adventure, stealth

Metal Gear Solid: Master Collection is a series of action-adventure stealth game compilations published by Konami. The compilations feature ports of titles in the Metal Gear franchise, released in commemoration of the series' 35th anniversary.

Split across volumes, Vol. 1 was announced in May 2023. It comprises the first five main entries in the franchise: Metal Gear (1987), Metal Gear 2: Solid Snake (1990), Metal Gear Solid (1998) alongside its Integral and VR Missions expansions, Metal Gear Solid 2: Sons of Liberty (2001), and Metal Gear Solid 3: Snake Eater (2004), as well as the Nintendo Entertainment System version of Metal Gear (1988) and its standalone sequel Snake's Revenge (1990), and the motion comics Metal Gear Solid: Digital Graphic Novel and Metal Gear Solid 2: Bande Dessinée as bonuses. Vol. 2 was announced in February 2026, and comprises Metal Gear Solid 4: Guns of the Patriots (2008) and Metal Gear Solid: Peace Walker (2010), in addition to the Game Boy Color title Metal Gear: Ghost Babel (2000) as a bonus game. Both collections include extras such as lore books, game screenplays, selected soundtracks, character dossiers and gameplay guides. In addition, Vol. 2 includes a full Unreal Engine 5 restoration of the Metal Gear Solid 4 Database, which collects and presents the entire series' canon up to the game's original release.

Vol. 1 was released for Nintendo Switch, PlayStation 4, PlayStation 5, Windows, and Xbox Series X/S on October 24, 2023. Vol. 2 was released for Nintendo Switch, Nintendo Switch 2, PlayStation 5, Windows and Xbox Series X/S on August 27, 2026.

== Games and overview ==
Games included in Vol. 1
1987	Metal Gear
1988	Metal Gear (Famicom/NES)
1989
1990	Snake's Revenge; Metal Gear 2: Solid Snake
1991
1992
1993
1994
1995
1996
1997
1998	Metal Gear Solid
1999	Metal Gear Solid: Integral; Metal Gear Solid: VR Missions
2000
2001	Metal Gear Solid 2: Sons of Liberty
2002
2003
2004	Metal Gear Solid 3: Snake Eater

Metal Gear Solid: Master Collection Vol. 1 presents five individual applications, each comprising one or two games and additional versions as well as its additional content. Metal Gear Solid and its two sequels each have their own application, while the MSX games Metal Gear and Metal Gear 2: Solid Snake, both based on their emulated versions originally included in Metal Gear Solid 3: Subsistence and the 'HD Edition', have been separated into their own shared application and launcher. The Nintendo Entertainment System (NES) games Metal Gear (1987) and Snake's Revenge (1990) are collected in the Bonus Content launcher, alongside extras such as the music player and graphic novels. The additional content for each game consists of digital copies of the respective games' boxes and instruction manuals, associated Master Book dossiers that divulge details on characters, narrative, and their place in Metal Gear's in-universe canon, as well as the corresponding screenplays for each game. Metal Gear Solid and its sequels are also sold individually, with a purchase of the former also bundling Metal Gear and Metal Gear 2: Solid Snake.

Metal Gear Solid (1998) in the Master Collection is primarily based on the game's original PlayStation version, while the standalone Metal Gear Solid VR Missions and Special Missions regional releases are accessible from its hub on the game selection screen, as well as the original Japanese release of Metal Gear Solid: Integral, which has been made available for the first time to North American players through its inclusion on the compilation. Due to the original Metal Gear Solid being presented in a 4:3 aspect ratio, an assortment of wallpapers can be selected both from the main menu and during gameplay, as well as adjustments to the game's display position. The collection includes the ability to create virtual save data for other Konami PlayStation titles and virtually swap controller ports from Player 1 to Player 2, which are mechanically relevant to the boss fight against Psycho Mantis. A digital replica of the game's original retail packaging is included to aid players in obtaining Meryl Silverburgh's Codec frequency number to contact her later in the game, as alluded to by Kenneth Baker in a cutscene.

Metal Gear Solid 2: Sons of Liberty (2001) and Metal Gear Solid 3: Snake Eater (2004) are both direct conversions of their HD Edition remasters previously developed by Bluepoint Games and distributed as part of the Metal Gear Solid HD Collection (2011) compilation for PlayStation 3, PlayStation Vita and Xbox 360. Despite Konami's claims of variable resolution and frame rate set ups for each target platform before release, the games within Vol. 1 were originally presented at a maximum resolution of 720p at launch; the PlayStation, Windows and Xbox Series X/S versions featured 60 frames-per-second (FPS) gameplay performance, while the Nintendo Switch release was capped at 30FPS regardless of handheld or docked configuration. The PC version was also released without any options to customize graphics or audio during gameplay. A subsequent update to Vol. 1 in March 2025 increased the game's base internal resolution on the former platforms to 1080p, a separate upscaling option for increasing the base image to 1440p and 4K resolutions, and a 'High Resolution' mode for MGS2 and MGS3 that additionally affects the respective games' pre-rendered cutscenes. A final major update in February 2026 added a 'Max Resolution' mode to the PlayStation 5, Windows and Xbox Series X/S versions, full keyboard and mouse control binding for the Windows release, and enhancements made to the Nintendo Switch version when played on the Nintendo Switch 2, such as the Resolution and upscaling options from the other releases, and full 60FPS support for MGS2 and MGS3 in both handheld and docked modes.

Games included in Vol. 2
2000	Metal Gear: Ghost Babel
2001
2002
2003
2004
2005
2006
2007
2008	Metal Gear Solid 4: Guns of the Patriots
2009
2010	Metal Gear Solid: Peace Walker

Metal Gear Solid: Master Collection Vol. 2 assumes a similar installation process and presentation as the previous volume, with Metal Gear Solid 4: Guns of the Patriots (2008) and Metal Gear Solid: Peace Walker (2010) each having a standalone application, while Metal Gear: Ghost Babel is featured in the Bonus Content hub alongside the game soundtracks. In addition to the screenplays, character dossiers and Master Books separately created for the Master Collection versions, Guns of the Patriots' launcher in Vol. 2 also contains the MGS4 Database app originally distributed as a standalone release on PlayStation Network in 2008, which catalogued the entire series' lore up through the game's initial launch, including Metal Gear Solid: Portable Ops (2006) and excluding any additions to canon made by subsequent games such as Peace Walker.

Guns of the Patriots within Master Collection Vol. 2 is a direct port of the original release with enhanced resolutions and framerate variability across platforms. The game outputs at up to 4K on Nintendo Switch 2 in TV Mode, PlayStation 5, Windows and Xbox Series X, while the Xbox Series S outputs at a max resolution of 1440p, 1080p on Nintendo Switch 2 in Handheld Mode, and the original Nintendo Switch version has a 1080p output in TV Mode, and a 720p presentation in Handheld Mode. All versions except the original Switch retain 60FPS performance during gameplay. The Master Collection version features a marginally updated control scheme for traditional gamepads, mapping the aiming and shooting inputs to each controllers' triggers by default as opposed to their bumper buttons, which are now used for accessing inventory and weapons. The game's notable product placement, which included the likenesses of the PlayStation 3 console and DualShock 3 controller, Playboy, Otacon's personal MacBook, and the ability to play additional background music on a licensed iPod during gameplay, have been retained on all platforms in the majority of cases; (Note: On Nintendo Switch and Nintendo Switch 2, the PlayStation 3 console has been removed in scenes aboard the Nomad, while the PlayStation Portable owned by Sunny and the DualShock 3 gamepads used as controllers for the Metal Gear Mk. II and Metal Gear REX have all been remodeled as generic black devices.) Dialogue references to the original PlayStation 3 and Blu-ray format during Codec calls with Otacon have been re-recorded to reference the applicable platforms for the Master Collection release, with voice actor Christopher Randolph briefly reprising his role. (Note: On Nintendo Switch 2, Otacon makes reference to a "high-spec platform" using high-capacity storage as opposed to explicitly identifying the console or Game Card format, unlike the Switch version.) The Master Collection port of MGS4 does not include the Metal Gear Online multiplayer component.

As was the case with Metal Gear Solid 2 and 3, the Master Collection version of Peace Walker is based on the game's prior 'HD Edition' remaster as distributed in the Metal Gear Solid HD Collection, now updated to run at up to 4K resolution on PlayStation 5, Windows and Xbox Series X, at up to 1440p on Xbox Series S, 1080p across both configurations on Nintendo Switch 2, and 720p on the original Switch, with all except Switch performing at 60FPS. Unlike MGS4, the game's multiplayer offerings, including the CO-OPs mode for up to four players, and the competitive VERSUS OPS mode for up to six players simultaneously, were retained, with the Nintendo Switch and Nintendo Switch 2 versions offering local play similar to the original PSP version. New to the Master Collection release is the ability to manually remap buttons and inputs in the game's settings, including keyboard and mouse controls on PC.

Ghost Babel in the Master Collection is an emulation of the original release, presented in 4:3 aspect ratio with the option for wallpapers bordering the game screen. As with Peace Walker, the ability to rebind inputs is supported, with the general game controls being updated to accommodate the expanded layout of modern controllers in addition to native mouse and keyboard compatibility on PC. Unique to Ghost Babel is the ability to rewind gameplay as a means of retrying progress without having to load a prior save, but the start point of each rewind period is reset when either overwriting the save file, returning to the title menu, or returning to mission select in the VR Training mode.

The primary games across both collections support Trophies and Achievements on most platforms excluding the NES titles and Ghost Babel, as well as language options. The vibration feedback from the DualShock and DualShock 2 controllers for certain in-game effects such as weapon fire and taking damage in action sequences, has been reimplemented for supported gamepads across each console platform and PC.

== Additional features ==
Vol. 1 includes the motion comics Metal Gear Solid: Digital Graphic Novel (originally released in 2006 for the PlayStation Portable) and Metal Gear Solid 2: Bande Dessinée (originally released exclusively in Japanese on DVD in 2008), which were previously included as extras with full English voice acting in the Metal Gear Solid Legacy Collection, released in 2013 for the PlayStation 3. Other extras include strategy guides, screenplay books, and an in-game sound selection of twenty tracks curated from each game in the collection. Remixes of the vocal tracks "The Best is Yet to Come" from Metal Gear Solid, "Can't Say Goodbye To Yesterday" from Sons of Liberty and the titular "Snake Eater" from Metal Gear Solid 3, were made available as pre-order bonuses. The Master Collection remaster of Guns of the Patriots within Vol. 2 is also bundled with the Metal Gear Solid 4 Database application originally released for PlayStation 3, which featured a full encyclopedia and timeline collecting the entire canon lore of the franchise up to, and including MGS4's events, which was entirely recreated, using Unreal Engine 5.

== Development ==
In November 2021, the digital downloads for Metal Gear Solid 2: Sons of Liberty and Metal Gear Solid 3: Snake Eater as well as the original Metal Gear Solid HD Collection were removed from digital storefronts, with Konami citing expired licenses as the reason. In July 2022, Konami announced their intentions to reinstate the games for the series' 35th anniversary.

During the development of Metal Gear Solid Delta: Snake Eater, Konami began the development of the Master Collection series to make "the most complete collection that celebrates the 35th anniversary of the series, allowing fans to play the games as they were, as first released on the latest platforms."

Close to the launch, M2, known for developing other video game compilations from Konami, confirmed that it worked in the compilation by providing emulation of Metal Gear (NES), Snake's Revenge, Metal Gear Solid and Metal Gear Solid: VR Missions, including their regional variants.

In September 2024, Noriaki Okumura confirmed plans to produce Vol. 2 of the Master Collection series, noting that they were aware of Vol. 1 launching in a state that was less desirable for players, and that they were using the time since to ensure a second compilation would not face similar problems. He also explained that the vast majority of subsequent Metal Gear titles released since Snake Eater were either not developed for high-definition consoles or were not eventually ported to capable platforms like Metal Gear Solid 2 and 3, implying that the games chosen for Vol. 2 would be more carefully curated around these parameters. Okamura also teased the opportunity for Metal Gear Solid 4: Guns of the Patriots (2008) to be re-released or included in a future compilation, as it remained the only main entry in the Metal Gear franchise to not be made available on any platform beyond its original hardware, the PlayStation 3.

== Marketing and release ==
Metal Gear Solid: Master Collection Vol. 1 was announced for the PlayStation 5 during a PlayStation Showcase in May 2023, immediately after the reveal of Metal Gear Solid Delta: Snake Eater.

In the original announcement, it was revealed to contain the first three Metal Gear Solid games. The game's listing on the PlayStation Store posted later that day confirmed that the collection would also contain content from the Integral version of Metal Gear Solid, alongside the original Metal Gear and Metal Gear 2: Solid Snake from the MSX. In June 2023, a Nintendo Direct revealed that the compilation would be released for Nintendo Switch, that it would include the Nintendo Entertainment System version of Metal Gear and its standalone sequel Snake's Revenge, and that it would include digital graphic novels for Metal Gear Solid and Metal Gear Solid 2. Releases for Windows via Steam and the Xbox Series X/S were confirmed later that day. In August 2023, a digital release for PlayStation 4 was confirmed to be in development, and was later announced as releasing the same day as on other platforms, with PS4 players entitled to a free PS5 upgrade.

Vol. 1 released on October 24, 2023, alongside standalone versions of the three Metal Gear Solid games for $19.99 each. Buying the standalone version of Metal Gear Solid grants access to Metal Gear and Metal Gear 2: Solid Snake. However, the NES version of Metal Gear, as well as Snake's Revenge, are exclusive to those who purchase the entire Collection. The Nintendo Switch physical release in North America and Europe only includes Metal Gear for MSX2, Metal Gear 2: Solid Snake, Metal Gear for NES and Snake's Revenge on the Game Card, while the rest of the contents have to be separately downloaded and installed to the console. The Japanese physical version also includes the original Metal Gear Solid.

Metal Gear Solid: Master Collection Vol. 2 was announced during a Konami-focused segment of Sony's State of Play video presentation in February 2026, confirming the game's release date and the inclusion of Metal Gear Solid 4: Guns of the Patriots (2008) and Metal Gear Solid: Peace Walker (2010) as its headlining games, the former of which being re-released and made available on non-PlayStation platforms for the first time. Also announced was the Game Boy Color game Metal Gear: Ghost Babel being featured as the volume's bonus game, now releasing under its original Japanese name to distinguish it as a non-canon entry.

== Reception ==
Master Collection Vol. 1 reception

Aggregate scores
Aggregator	Score
Metacritic	PS5: 74/100; XSXS: 74/100; NS: 78/100
OpenCritic	63% recommend

=== Vol. 1 ===
Metal Gear Solid: Master Collection Vol. 1 has received a mixed reception among critics. The Nintendo Switch version of the compilation was scored the highest at 78/100 on review aggregator website Metacritic, while both the PlayStation 5 and Xbox Series X/S versions garnered a comparatively lower aggregate score of 74/100. A common point of praise among reviewers was the comprehensive nature and overall presentation of the games and their associated contents. GameSpot writer Richard Wakeling praised the bonus contents included outside the core games, particularly drawing attention towards the inclusion of the Master Book dossiers and screenplays for each respective game. Throughout the first year of release Konami implemented significant updates to the collection, trying to address its "rough launch" according to the company. While some thought the features should have been in the ports from launch, improved reception followed as a result of these additions.

Master Collection Vol. 2 reception

Aggregate scores
Aggregator	Score
Metacritic	PC: 83/100; PS5: 85/100; XSXS: 83/100; NS2: 84/100
OpenCritic	85% recommend
