= Fossil Fighters: Frontier =

2014 video game

- North American box art
- Developer: Spike Chunsoft
- Publisher: Nintendo
- Directors: Shingo Matsumoto; Kaori Ando
- Producers: Daizaburo Takami; Yuu Ohshima; Hitoshi Yamagami
- Designer: Shunichi Li
- Programmer: Masayasu Yamamoto
- Writers: Taro Achi; Shuntaro Ashida; Kei Yamano
- Composer: Katsumi Yokokawa
- Series: Fossil Fighters
- Platform: Nintendo 3DS
- Release: JP: February 27, 2014; NA: March 20, 2015; EU: May 29, 2015; AU: May 30, 2015; KOR: August 6, 2015
- Genre: Role-playing video game
- Modes: Single-player, multiplayer

Fossil Fighters: Frontier (Note: Known in Japan as Kasekihorider Mugengear (カセキホリダー ムゲンギア; lit. "Fossil Diggers Infinite Gear")) is a 2014 role-playing video game developed by Spike Chunsoft, with assistance from Red Entertainment and Cyclone Zero, and published by Nintendo for the Nintendo 3DS console. The game is the third title in the Fossil Fighters series and the first on the Nintendo 3DS. It was released in Japan on February 27, 2014, in North America on March 20, 2015, and in Europe on May 29, 2015, making it the first installment of the series to be officially released in that part of the world.

== Gameplay ==
Players navigate various dig sites using a vehicle called a Bone Buggy, which can be customized. In the dig sites, they can find Fossils and revive them into dinosaur-like monsters called vivosaurs, which can be used in competitive three-on-three fights via Local Play or online. Vivosaurs have a total of eight moves, which are unlocked by finding specific Fossils. Fossils are excavated in a minigame that involves digging out the fossil with a drill and hammer; this utilizes the 3DS's bottom screen. The minigame has a time limit that can be extended by buying batteries.

Unlike in the previous two installments, the player encounters wild vivosaurs instead of battling other Fossil Fighters in dig sites. The battle system also differs from that of Fossil Fighters and Fossil Fighters: Champions in that the player controls one vivosaur on their team, while the other two are controlled by CPU partners called "Paleo Pals". Paleo Pals can give the player support shots with a variety of effects. Instead of being based around the position of the vivosaurs in the field like in the previous two titles, the battles revolve around a vivosaur's stance, with each vivosaur having different strong and weak stances.

The player character's primary vivosaur is Nibbles, a special vivosaur who accompanies them in the overworld, though he is not required to be used in combat. Nibbles has a specialized combat form that evolves at certain points in the story.

== Plot ==
Stryker, an agent of the organization INTERFOL, confronts Dr. Baron von Blackraven in his lair and defeats him and his corrupted vivosaur after he refuses to surrender. As Stryker prepares to take Blackraven into custody, however, he sees something that horrifies him.

Five years later, Stryker is the head of the Wardens, a division of INTERFOL whose members travel the world investigating vivosaur activity and protecting the Fossil Parks. Eight teenagers arrive at the Warden HQ in Fossil Park Asia to take the final test to become Wardens, having shown potential in previous tests; one of them, the protagonist, has dreamed of joining INTERFOL. After the protagonist learns how to operate a Bone Buggy and excavate fossils, Nate, one of the recruits, accidentally releases a mysterious vivosaur after tampering with machinery in the HQ's laboratory. As he and the protagonist pursue him, a rogue Gorgo attacks them; ignoring Nate's order to flee, the protagonist fights the Gorgo, but is overpowered until Stryker intervenes and saves them and Roland. Afterwards, the recruits are paired up for the final test, with the protagonist's partner being Roland.

After passing the Warden Test, the protagonist and Roland officially become Wardens, and the vivosaur, who the protagonist names Nibbles, becomes their partner vivosaur. Stryker sends them to visit the three main Fossil Parks, Fossil Park Asia, Fossil Park America, and Fossil Park Europe, and help their respective leaders Liu Ren, Sean, and Drake while fighting against the BR Brigade, which includes Blackraven, its leader, and his subordinates Kowloon and Olga. As the Brigade obtains the Mega Electrominite, Stryker sends the protagonist to stop their plan to infiltrate tournaments at Fossil Park Asia and Fossil Park Europe to obtain Cosmonium, which was used to make the trophies, but they succeed in stealing them. Eventually, Stryker discovers that Blackraven plans to use the Mega Electrominite and the Cosmonium to build a time gate to travel back in time. He sends the protagonist back in time to stop his plans, but warns them that they must return to the present before the gate closes and traps them in the past. Upon arriving in the past, the protagonist discovers that Blackraven is using a machine to brainwash dinosaurs, which could affect vivosaurs in the present. However, the machine is destroyed after Nibbles releases energy that Blackraven recognizes as dark energy, and he realizes that Stryker lied about destroying his "ultimate weapon". As the Brigade and the protagonist hurry to return to the present before the time gate closes, Nibbles sacrifices himself to boost the protagonist's Bone Buggy through the gate, stranding him in the past.

Upon returning to the present, the protagonist is distraught over Nibbles' sacrifice until he is revived using the Dinodisc that Dr. Digmore had discovered, which is revealed to be his Dino Gear. However, soon after Kowloon captures Nibbles and escapes on the Brigade's ship, the Neo Black Whale. As the protagonist prepares to storm the Neo Black Whale to rescue Nibbles, they learn of his true nature as the Dreadsaurus, an experimental vivosaur capable of consuming infinite amounts of dark energy. After Blackraven was arrested, Stryker and others attempted to remove the dark energy from the Dreadsaurus. After this failed, they crystallized the dark energy and sealed it within the Dreadsaurus before placing him in a state of hibernation and claiming that he had been destroyed. While the Dreadsaurus's bond with the protagonist caused the dark energy to diminish, it did not disappear completely.

While heading through the Neo Black Whale to confront Blackraven and rescue Nibbles, the protagonist defeats Olga, who returns to normal after having been brainwashed; and Kowloon, who flees. In the ship's depths, Blackraven sends the Dreadsaurus to attack the protagonist, but his bond with them causes him to return to normal and regain his memories, after which he evolves into his final form, Crimson Ravager. In a last-ditch effort to defeat the protagonist, Blackraven uses dark energy to transform into Dreadraven, but is defeated and destroyed. Stryker thanks the protagonist for stopping Blackraven and the Brigade, but tells them that their duties as a Warden will continue.

== Development ==
The game was first announced for North America at E3 2014.

== Reception ==
Reception

Aggregate score
Aggregator	Score
Metacritic	57/100

Review scores
Publication	Score
Computer Games Magazine	4/10
Destructoid	3/10
Nintendo Life	7/10
Nintendo World Report	7.5/10
The Guardian	4/5

Fossil Fighters: Frontier received "mixed or average" reviews, according to review aggregator Metacritic.
