= First Kiss Story II =

2002 video game

- Developers: HuneX, M2
- Publishers: Broccoli, Arcadia Entertainer
- Platforms: Dreamcast, PlayStation 2 (Stories)
- Release: JP: August 8, 2002
- Genre: Visual novel
- Mode: Single player

First Kiss Story II (Japanese: ファーストKiss☆物語II) (Note: While 物語 normally would be read as monogatari, the ruby characters show that it is read as ストーリー (sutōrī), or 'story'.) is a romance visual novel, the sequel to First Kiss Story. It was released for the Dreamcast on August 8, 2002. It is also part of the PlayStation 2 enhanced port titled First Kiss Stories.

An example of basic gameplay. Here, Ran is introducing herself.
