= Fossil Fighters: Champions =

2010 video game

- North American front cover of Fossil Fighters: Champions.
- Developers: Nintendo SPD; Red Entertainment; M2; Artdink
- Publisher: Nintendo
- Designers: Taro Achi (scenario concept); Fukui Prefectural Dinosaur Museum (encyclopedia supervisor)
- Composers: Megumi Komagata; Kyoko Nakamura
- Series: Fossil Fighters
- Platform: Nintendo DS
- Release: JP: November 18, 2010; NA: November 14, 2011
- Genre: Role-playing video game
- Modes: Single-player, multiplayer

Fossil Fighters: Champions (Note: Known in Japan as Super Kasekihoridā (スーパーカセキホリダー; lit. Super Fossil Diggers)) is a 2010 video game developed by Nintendo SPD, Red Entertainment, M2, and Artdink and published by Nintendo. The game is a sequel to its original title, Fossil Fighters. It was released in Japan on November 18, 2010 as Super Kasekihoridā and in North America on November 14, 2011 after it was revealed that year to the US at Nintendo's 2011 E3 conference, at the time being titled "Super Fossil Fighters". It features the first 100 vivosaurs from the original game, as well as new vivosaurs, new gameplay mechanics, and a new setting.

== Gameplay ==
=== Finding Fossil Rocks ===
Fossil Fighters: Champions is similar to the first game but adds new gameplay elements. Gameplay consists of collecting fossils to revive them into dinosaur-like monsters known as "vivosaurs" and using them to battle other vivosaurs. Players gain fossils by purchasing them in shops, as rewards for quests, or digging them up in specified locations indicated by a sonar. These rocks can be dug up at dig sites, of which there are 12 scattered across the Caliosteo Islands. Multiple new fossil rock types are added; the odd (or curious) and giant fossil rocks, which are larger and take more time to clean, the Wonderous Fossil rock, which changes a vivosaur's color and improves its stats, and the Miraculous Fossil rock, which can evolve specific vivosaurs into a new form and improves the stats of vivosaurs who do not gain a new form.

New abilities can be gained for collecting fossil rocks, similar to the first game. By talking to the three Tudor brothers in Fighter Stations, the player can gain the ability to see the element of the fossils they dig up, find dark fossil rocks, and use team skills during battle. The sonar can also be upgraded through buying upgrades in the shop, which allows for different body part fossils to be found, a decreased likelihood of finding a rock without a fossil in it, and a larger range with more detecting instruments. Once the player's sonar is fully upgraded, sonar covers can be applied that change its look on the top screen. The final fossil-collecting upgrade can also be purchased at the shop, and increases the size of the player's inventory.

=== Cleaning ===
Fossils must be cleaned before they are able to be revived. The player uses either a hammer or a drill, each with different strengths and weaknesses, in a cleaning minigame using the DS touchscreen to remove the surrounding rock. The minigame has a ninety-second time limit, as well as a meter to show how much of the fossil is revealed and how damaged it is. Two new types of fossil rocks are added in this game compared to the predecessor; giant fossil rocks, which contain all four fossils for a particular vivosaur, and odd fossil rocks, which have two sides that the player can flip between while cleaning and contain a full vivosaur in one fossil. Certain fossil rocks now have buster points that allow for large chunks of the rock to be cleared quickly. While cleaning a fossil, players can use the consumable items busterprobe or time plus to make cleaning easier, and the super hammer and super drill can be purchased, which are stronger versions of their base counterparts.

Additionally, instead of cleaning fossils by hand, fossils that have already been cleaned once can be dropped off to the cleaning robot KL-33N, who automatically cleans fossils for the player and gradually improves its skills by watching the player clean fossils. KL-33N cannot clean dark, odd, giant, wonderous, or miraculous fossil rocks. When a fossil rock that has already cleaned is cleaned again, the fossil with the lower score is converted into Donation Points, which can be exchanged for various rewards such as unique fossil rocks, Battle Points, and masks.

Cleaning can also be done without the goal of reviving vivosaurs, mostly through side quests. Throughout the game, different characters can ask for help cleaning, including at the Hare Club, which is a club in Cranial City dedicated to cleaning. Succeeding does not give the player the fossil but results in some other type of reward. The Hare Club specifically provides rewards for cleaning up to 100 fossil rocks.

=== Revival ===
Getting the head fossil is mandatory to revive a creature, while the other three parts strengthen it. The body, arms, and legs fossils are no longer required for vivosaurs to learn all of their moves, with moves instead being gained through ranking up. All original 100 vivosaurs return from the original game; newly added vivosaurs include mollusks, mammoths, and sabre-tooth tigers. Like the first game, special vivosaurs can be found as rewards from defeating post-game opponents.

This game also introduces the vivosaur bank mechanic, which allows vivosaurs to be stored outside of the player's main collection, giving the opportunity for multiple versions of the same vivosaur to be collected at once. This allows for customization with different versions of the same vivosaur having different silver or gold fossils integrated. This change also lets a team include more than one of the same vivosaur.

=== Battle ===
Fossil Fighters: Champions uses a similar battle system as its predecessor. Along with an associated element which has elemental strengths and weaknesses, vivosaurs are categorized by what range they best attack at: short, medium, and long range. Instead of the attack, support, and escape zones featured in the original game, both sides can rotate their three vivosaurs on the playfield in a three by two hexagon to move their vivosaurs into their strongest range to maximize damage. The team with the higher total speed goes first in a battle, as opposed to the previous game, in which the team with the lower total LP (health) goes first. Whichever side defeats all of the opposition's vivosaurs first wins the battle, and this is done by using FP (fossil power) to use vivosaur-specific skills against opposing vivosaurs. These skills can be attacks that hurt one or all opposing vivosaurs or buffing moves that improve one of the team's vivosaur's stats. In addition to skills, vivosaurs have unique support effects which apply when they are not in the front of the team and effect the stats of the leading vivosaurs at the front of either party, depending on the vivosaur. Finally, vivosaurs each have abilities that give them small bonuses during battle, such as doing more damage when they have an elemental advantage against their target, giving a bonus to FP at the start of a turn, or starting the battle with a specific effect already applied to them. All of these unique attributes, as well as each vivosaur's spread of the five main stats (health, attack, defense, accuracy, and speed), allow for a wide variety of strategies.

Increases in FP are granted to the player after completing enough main or side quests to level up, as opposed to the original game's method of increasing FP after each fighter rank increase (which was tied to story progression). Side quests can be found through the info desk at each island's Fossil Guild. Vivosaurs can now have a maximum rank of 20, instead of the original game's maximum rank of 12, increasing rank now only takes 50 Battle Points (experience points) instead of 100, and support effects from vivosaurs now scale with rank.

=== Added features ===
At the start of the game, the player can now choose to play as a girl or a boy and choose between four starting vivosaurs (one of each main element). When at a dig site, there is now an option to view a map of the site on the top screen instead of the default sonar. The game also adds the toggle for Auto Battle, which comes with multiple settings to determine the strategy the game uses when battling on behalf of the player. Additionally, cleaning can now be done with friends over DS wireless play at the Clean Z. Fossil Cleaning-Party Emporium, and the Fossil Cannon functions the same as the original game, being able to send fossils to friends over DS wireless play. Teams of vivosaurs can be uploaded online to battle online challengers, and for a limited time, bonus content was available to be downloaded through Nintendo Wi-Fi Connection. This bonus content is no longer available except through a fan hosted method.

== Plot ==
After having rescued the nameable protagonist and their best friend Todd in an introduction cutscene, Joe Wildwest, the proud owner of Caliosteo Islands (comprising the Ribular, Cranial, and Ilium Islands), organizes the Caliosteo Cup, a tournament in which participants battle with vivosaurs and the winner will be rewarded with ownership of the park. The game then follows the Hero and their friends through the seven rounds of the Caliosteo Cup, which all begin with the opening of a new dig site around the islands.

Throughout the digging sessions between rounds of the Caliosteo Cup, the Hero meets Professor Nigel Scatterly, a professor who is in charge of the Caliosteo Museum on Cranial Isle and is investigating the history of the islands. Through six ancient tablets slowly found along the adventure called the Caliosteo Slablets, it is revealed that the islands used to be ruled by an evil sorcerer named Zongazonga, who himself threw tournaments of vivosaur battles to choose a new vessel for him to inhabit and prolong his eternal life. Eventually, the people of the islands prevailed against the sorcerer and managed to seal his skull away in a stone chest in the Stone Pyramid on Ribular Island.

The criminal BareBones Brigade, led by the skeletal Don Boneyard and with Cole, Lester, and Lola as lieutenants, tries to stop the tournament in between rounds, but Joe Wildwest organizes the protagonist and their friends into the Patrol Team to counter this threat. These friends are Todd, the best friend of the Hero since the start of the game, Pauleen, a girl of the Digadig tribe (featured in the first game) who wears a magic mask to feel more confident, and Rupert, an egotistical boy who is the son of a wealthy business CEO and eventually joins the Patrol Team after learning to stand against his father. Cole, Lester, and Lola each attempt their own plans throughout the rounds, causing mayhem meant to disrupt the Cup and using their special boneysaurs to battle with the Hero. After their individual plans fail, Don Boneyard resorts to attacking the Spinal Pillar, a giant spinal column structure that supports the three islands and keeps them from sinking. By using the calcium from a Sardinisaurus fossil, the Hero is able to repair the pillar and thwart the BareBones Brigade's final plan. With this defeat, the Hero is led to the BareBones Brigade base on Bonechip Island, beating their leader Don Boneyard in a fossil battle and seemingly eliminating the threat of the group for the rest of the Cup.

During the final round of the Caliosteo Cup, Joe Wildwest reveals himself to be the ancient sorcerer Zongazonga, who was released accidentally by Joe, possessed Joe's body, and began impersonating him sometime between his rescue of the Hero and the start of the Caliosteo Cup. He tries to possess the Hero, but is foiled by Don Boneyard, who returns and reveals himself to be the real Joe Wildwest and helps the Hero escape. When the Hero confronts Zongazonga with the Caliosteo Pipsqueak, a mallet-like tool used to detach him from Joe's body found by returning to the Stone Pyramid, he knocks it out of the hero's hands and challenges them to a Fossil Battle. He loses, and the Hero knocks Zongazonga out of Joe's body. However, he escapes with Rupert and possesses his body, then summons his castle, where the hero faces him. Zongazonga is defeated and separates from Rupert, but then transforms into his zombiesaur form. However, he is defeated again, and his skull is broken and sealed and his castle is destroyed. The Hero and Rupert are then rescued by Todd, Pauleen, and Joe’s Ptera.

== Reception ==
Reception

Aggregate score
Aggregator	Score
Metacritic	68/100

Review scores
Publication	Score
GameSpot	6.5/10
IGN	7.5/10
RPGamer	3.5/5

Fossil Fighters: Champions received a score of 68/100 on Metacritic. IGN called the fossil cleaning mechanic "fun" and enjoyable for fans of dinosaurs or of the previous game, while RPGamer and GameSpot criticized the similarity without improvement. Some online reviewers criticized the decrease in depth for the story compared to the original. Multiple reviews pointed out the franchise's similarity to Pokémon. The game performed well enough to merit another sequel, Fossil Fighters: Frontier for the Nintendo 3DS.
