= M2 (game developer) =

Video game developer

M2 Co., Ltd.
- Industry: Video game
- Founded: August 8, 1991; 35 years ago
- Headquarters: Abiko, Japan
- Area served: Worldwide
- Products: Video Games
- Number of employees: 51
- Website: mtwo.co.jp

M2 Co., Ltd. (Japanese: 有限会社Ｍ２(エムツー), Hepburn: Yūgengaisha emutsū) is a Japanese video game developer and publisher, best known for handling emulation of re-released games, such as some Sega Ages titles, Virtual Console titles for Nintendo systems, the 3D Classics series for the Nintendo 3DS and their ShotTriggers range of classic STG games. M2 has also created entirely new titles such as WiiWare games for Konami under the ReBirth moniker and more recently a new GG Aleste game. In addition, M2 currently holds the rights of Aleste series (except M.U.S.H.A., whose publishing rights are owned by Sega), all of SPS game plus software and all NEC Avenue and NEC Interchannel games on TurboGrafx-16 and variants, previously owned by Lightweight.

== Games ==
The following publisher names are in parentheses.

=== Developed and/or ported ===
Year	Title	Platform(s)	Publisher(s)	Ref.
1993	Gauntlet IV	Sega Genesis	Sega	
1995	Gunstar Heroes	Game Gear	Sega, Treasure	
1998	Doki Doki Poyatchio	PlayStation	King Record	
1999	Sakura Wars	Windows, Dreamcast	Sega	
2002	Di Gi Charat: Di Gi Communication	Game Boy Advance	Broccoli	
2002	First Kiss Story II	Dreamcast	Broccoli, Arcadia Entertainer	
2002	Niruchana!	i-mode	Kadokawa, M2	
2003	Di Gi Charat Fantasy	PlayStation 2	Broccoli	
2003	First Kiss Story	PlayStation 2	Broccoli, Arcadia Entertainer	
2004	Di Gi Communication 2: Datou! Black GemaGema Dan!	Game Boy Advance	Broccoli, M2	
2005	One Piece: Dragon Dream!	Game Boy Advance	Bandai	
2008	Fossil Fighters	Nintendo DS	Nintendo	
2008	Gradius ReBirth	Wii	Konami	
2008	Otomedius G	Xbox 360	Konami	
2009	Castlevania: The Adventure ReBirth	Wii	Konami	
2009	Contra ReBirth	Wii	Konami	
2009	Mushihimesama Futari ver. 1.5	Xbox 360	Cave	
2010	Fossil Fighters: Champions	Nintendo DS	Nintendo	
2010	Shining Hearts	PlayStation Portable	Sega	
2011	Beyond the Future: Fix the Time Arrows	PlayStation 3, PlayStation Portable	5pb.	
2011	Dunamis 15	PlayStation 3, Xbox 360, PlayStation Portable	5pb.	
2011	Steins;Gate: Variant Space Octet	Windows	5pb.	
2012	Akatsuki no Goei Trinity	PlayStation 3, PlayStation Portable	Akabeisoft2, 5pb.	
2012	Miyako	PlayStation Portable	Idea Factory, Lanterne Rooms	
2013	Ahoke Chanbara	Android, iOS	M2	
2013	Talking Girls! Second	Android	Wanimagazine	
2014	Koihime Enbu	Arcade, PlayStation 3, PlayStation 4, Windows	BaseSon, Unknown Games	
2014	Talking Girls! Second Vol. 2	Android	Wanimagazine	
2015	Karin to Issho! Kyōwa Nanho Aruita Kana? Komyunikēshon Ando Hosū Chekkuapuri	iOS	D3 Publisher	
2015	Sci-Fi Assault Mothership Beluga - 16-bit Edition	PlayStation Vita	Sega	
2015	Skullgirls 2nd Encore	Arcade	M2	
2015	Yakuza 0 Free Companion App for PlayStation Vita	PlayStation Vita	Sega	
2015	Yakuza 6: The Song of Life	PlayStation 4	Sega	
2016	Malus Code	Windows	Dogenzaka Lab	
2016	Plastic Memories	PlayStation Vita	5pb.	
2017	The Legend of Dark Witch 3: Wisdom and Lunacy	Nintendo 3DS	Flyhigh Works	
2017	Occultic;Nine	PlayStation 4, PlayStation Vita, Xbox One	5pb.	
2017	Sorcer Striker	PlayStation 4	M2	
2017	Steins;Gate 0	Xbox One	5pb.	
2018	Chinuchō	Windows	Kadokawa	
2018	Steins;Gate Elite	Nintendo Switch	5pb.	
2019	Tokyo School Life	Nintendo Switch, Windows	M2	
2020	GG Aleste 3	Nintendo Switch, PlayStation 4	M2	
2021	Getsu Fūma Den	Windows	Konami	
2021	G-Darius HD	Nintendo Switch, PlayStation 4, Windows	Taito	
2021	Legend of Mana	Android, iOS, Nintendo Switch, PlayStation 4, Windows	Square Enix	
2021	Senxin Aleste	Arcade	M2	
2022	Anonymous;Code	Nintendo Switch, PlayStation 4	Mages.	
2023	DoDonPachi DaiOuJou Re:Incarnation	Nintendo Switch, PlayStation 4	M2	

=== Emulation ===
Year	Title	Platform(s)	Publisher(s)	Ref.
2015	Yakuza 0	PlayStation 3, PlayStation 4	Sega	
2015	Yakuza 6: The Song of Life	PlayStation 4	Sega	
2016	Battle Garegga Rev.2016	PlayStation 4, Xbox One	M2	
2017	Collection of Mana	Nintendo Switch	Square Enix	
2017	Dangun Feveron	PlayStation 4, Xbox One	M2	
2017	Sorcer Striker	PlayStation 4	M2	
2017	Steins;Gate 0	Xbox One	5pb.	
2018	Ketsui Deathtiny: Kizuna Jigoku Tachi	PlayStation 4	M2	
2018	Mega Man X Legacy Collection	PlayStation 4, Windows, Xbox One	Capcom	
2018	Sega Ages Gain Groundain Ground	Nintendo Switch	Sega	
2018	Sega Ages OutRun	Nintendo Switch	Sega	
2018	Sega Ages Phantasy Star	Nintendo Switch	Sega	
2018	Sega Ages Sonic the Hedgehog	Nintendo Switch	Sega	
2018	Sega Ages Thunder Force IV	Nintendo Switch	Sega	
2018	Super Gachapon World: SD Gundam X	Nintendo Switch	Bandai Namco Entertainment	
2019	Castlevania Anniversary Collection	Nintendo Switch, PlayStation 4, Windows, Xbox One	Konami	
2019	Contra Anniversary Collection	Nintendo Switch, PlayStation 4, Windows, Xbox One, Amazon Luna	Konami	
2019	Darius Cozmic Collection	Nintendo Switch, PlayStation 4, Windows	Taito	
2019	ESP Ra.De. Psi	Nintendo Switch, PlayStation 4	M2	
2019	SD Gundam G Generation: Monoeye Gundams	Nintendo Switch, PlayStation 4	Bandai Namco Entertainment	
2019	Sega Ages Alex Kidd in Miracle World	Nintendo Switch	Sega	
2019	Sega Ages Columns II	Nintendo Switch	Sega	
2019	Sega Ages Ichidant-R	Nintendo Switch	Sega	
2019	Sega Ages Puyo Puyo	Nintendo Switch	Sega	
2019	Sega Ages Shinobi	Nintendo Switch	Sega	
2019	Sega Ages Space Harrier	Nintendo Switch	Sega	
2019	Sega Ages Virtua Racing	Nintendo Switch	Sega	
2019	Sega Ages Wonder Boy in Monster Land	Nintendo Switch	Sega	
2020	Aleste Collection	Nintendo Switch, PlayStation 4	M2	
2020	Final Bubble Bobble	Nintendo Switch	Taito	
2020	Namco Museum Archives	PlayStation 4, Windows, Xbox One	Bandai Namco Entertainment	
2020	Sega Ages G-LOC: Air Battle	Nintendo Switch	Sega	
2020	Sega Ages Herzog Zwei	Nintendo Switch	Sega	
2020	Sega Ages Puyo Puyo 2	Nintendo Switch	Sega	
2020	Sega Ages Sonic the Hedgehog 2	Nintendo Switch	Sega	
2020	Sega Ages Thunder Force AC	Nintendo Switch	Sega	
2020	Space Invaders 90	Nintendo Switch	Taito	
2020	Super Momotaro Dentetsu	Nintendo Switch	Konami	
2021	Castlevania Advance Collection	Nintendo Switch, PlayStation 4, PlayStation 5, Windows, Xbox One, Xbox Series X/S	Konami	
2021	Getsu Fūma Den	Windows	Konami	
2021	Kyukyoku Tiger Heli: Toaplan Arcade Garage	Nintendo Switch, PlayStation 4	M2	
2021	Lost Judgment	PlayStation 4, PlayStation 5, Xbox One, Xbox Series X/S	Sega	
2021	Sega Genesis for Nintendo Switch Online	Nintendo Switch	Nintendo	
2022	Hishou Same! Same Same! Toaplan Arcade Garage	Nintendo Switch, PlayStation 4	M2	
2023	Assault Suits Valken Declassified	Nintendo Switch	Rainmaker Productions	
2023	Ray'z Arcade Chronology	Nintendo Switch, PlayStation 4, Windows	Taito	
2023	Zero Fire: Toaplan Arcade Garage	Nintendo Switch, PlayStation 4	M2	
2024	Castlevania Dominus Collection	Nintendo Switch, PlayStation 5, Windows, Xbox Series X/S	Konami	
2025	Yakuza 0 Director's Cut	Nintendo Switch 2	Sega	

=== Arcade ===
- Dengeki Bunko FIGHTING CLIMAX (Sega)
- Dengeki Bunko FIGHTING CLIMAX IGNITION (Sega)
- Elevator Action (2014 release) (Taito)
- Fantasy Zone II: The Tears of Opa-Opa (System 16 remake) (Sega)
- Chunithm (Irodorimidori story) (Sega)
- Koihime Enbu (development assistance) (Unknown Games)
- Rastan Saga (2014 release) (Taito)
- Skullgirls: 2nd Encore
- Senjin Aleste

=== Dedicated Console ===
- Game Gear Micro (Sega)
- Nintendo Classic Mini: Family Computer - Weekly Shōnen Jump 50th Anniversary Version (Nintendo)
- PasocomMini PC-8801mkIISR (M2FM sound driver) (Micomsoft)
- Sega Genesis Mini (Sega)
- Sega Genesis Mini 2 (Sega)
- TurboGrafx-16 Mini (Konami)

=== Dreamcast ===
- First Kiss Story II (Broccoli)
- Sakura Taisen (Sega)

=== Game Boy Advance ===
- One Piece: Dragon Dream! (Bandai)
- Di Gi Charat: Di Gi Communication (Broccoli)
- Di Gi Communication 2: Datou! Black GemaGema Dan! (Broccoli)

=== Game Gear ===
- GG Aleste 3
- Gunstar Heroes (Sega)

=== Mega Drive/Genesis ===
- Darius (Taito)
- Darius Extra Version (Taito / Columbus Circle / Strictly Limited Games)
- Fantasy Zone (Sega)
- Gauntlet IV (Tengen)
- Spatter (Sega)
- Super Locomotive (Sega)
- Tetris (Sega)
- VS Puyo Puyo Sun (Sega)

==== Mega Drive PLUS / Sega Mark V ====
- Space Harrier (Sega)
- Space Harrier II (Sega)

=== Mobile ===
- Ahoge Chanbara
- Graffiti Smash (Bandai Namco Entertainment)
- Karin to Issho! (D3 Publisher)
- Legend of Mana Remastered (Square Enix)
- Niruchana! (Kadokawa Shoten)
- Talking Girls! SECOND (WANIMAGAZINE)
- Talking Girls! SECOND vol.2 (WANIMAGAZINE)
- Tenkahyakken -Zan- (Kadokawa)
- Pac-Man Dash! (Bandai Namco Entertainment)

=== Nintendo DS ===
- Fossil Fighters (Nintendo)
- Fossil Fighters: Champions (Nintendo)
- Konami Classics Series: Arcade Hits (Konami)
- Namco Museum DS (Namco Bandai)

=== Nintendo 3DS ===
- Game Center CX: 3-Choume no Arino (Bandai Namco Games)
- Lost Heroes (pre-order bonus game) (Bandai Namco Games)
- Lost Heroes 2 (pre-order bonus game) (Bandai Namco Games)
- Virtual Console – Game Gear (Sega)
- The Legend of Dark Witch 3: Wisdom and Lunacy (Flyhigh Works / Circle Entertainment)

==== 3D Classics ====
- 3D After Burner II (Sega)
- 3D Altered Beast (Sega)
- 3D Ecco the Dolphin (Sega)
- 3D Fantasy Zone (Sega)
- 3D Fantasy Zone II W (Sega)
- 3D Galaxy Force II (Sega)
- 3D Gunstar Heroes (Sega)
- 3D Out Run (Sega)
- 3D Power Drift (Sega)
- 3D Puyo Puyo 2 (Sega)
- 3D Shinobi III: Return of the Ninja Master (Sega)
- 3D Sonic the Hedgehog (Sega)
- 3D Sonic the Hedgehog 2 (Sega)
- 3D Space Harrier (Sega)
- 3D Streets of Rage (Sega)
- 3D Streets of Rage 2 (Sega)
- 3D Super Hang-On (Sega)
- 3D Thunder Blade (Sega)
- Sega 3D Fukkoku Archives (Sega)
- Sega 3D Classics Collection (Sega)
- Sega 3D Fukkoku Archives 1 & 2 Double Pack (Sega)
- Sega 3D Fukkoku Archives 3: Final Stage (Sega)
- Sega 3D Fukkoku Archives Triple Pack (Sega)

=== Nintendo Switch ===
- 8-Bit ADV Steins;Gate (Included with Steins;Gate Elite) (Mages.)
- ESP Ra.De. Psi (Cave)
- Mega Man X Legacy Collection (partial) (Capcom)
- Darius Cozmic Collection (Taito)
- Final Bubble Bobble (SMS) (Taito)
- Collection of Mana (Square Enix)
- Castlevania Anniversary Collection (Konami)
- Contra Anniversary Collection (Konami)
- Tokyo School Life (PQube)
- Namcot Collection (Bandai Namco Entertainment)
- Namco Museum Archives (Bandai Namco Entertainment)
- Darius Cozmic Revelation (Taito, G-Darius HD, G-Darius Ver.2 and Darius (Extra Version) only)
- Aleste Collection
- Super Momotaro Dentetsu (NES) (Konami)
- Castlevania Advance Collection (Konami)
- Power Poke Dash (GBA) (Konami)
- Sega Genesis - Nintendo Switch Online (Nintendo)
- Toaplan Arcade Garage: Kyukyoku Tiger-Heli (Limited Run Games)
- Teki Paki
- Getsu Fuuma Den (NES) (Konami)
- Legend of Mana Remastered (Square Enix)
- Ray'z Arcade Chronology (Taito)
- Assault Suits Valken DECLASSIFIED (Rainmaker Productions)
- Toaplan Arcade Garage: Hishou Same! Same! Same!
- Toaplan Arcade Garage: Zero Fire
- Metal Gear Solid: Master Collection Vol. 1 (Metal Gear (NES), Snake's Revenge, Metal Gear Solid) (Konami)
- Super Momotaro Dentetsu II (SNES) (Konami)
- Space Invaders 90 (Genesis) (Taito)
- Castlevania Dominus Collection (Konami)
- Zaleste (Compile Heart)
- Night Striker Gear
- Operation Night Strikers (Taito)
- Gradius Origins (Konami)
- Ganbare Goemon Daishūgō! (Konami)
- Metal Gear Solid: Master Collection Vol. 2 (Metal Gear: Ghost Babel) (Konami)
- Rainbow Islands CS (Taito)
- Metal Slug Ultimate Collection (SNK)

==== Sega Ages ====
- Sega Ages Sonic the Hedgehog (Sega)
- Sega Ages Sonic the Hedgehog 2 (Sega)
- Sega Ages Thunder Force IV (Technosoft)
- Sega Ages Phantasy Star (Sega)
- Sega Ages Outrun (Sega)
- Sega Ages Gain Ground (Sega)
- Sega Ages Alex Kidd in Miracle World (Sega)
- Sega Ages Puyo Puyo (Sega)
- Sega Ages Virtua Racing (Sega)
- Sega Ages Wonder Boy in Monster Land (Sega)
- Sega Ages Space Harrier (Sega)
- Sega Ages Fantasy Zone (Sega)
- Sega Ages Shinobi (Sega)
- Sega Ages G-LOC: Air Battle (Sega)
- Sega Ages Herzog Zwei (Sega)

=== Nintendo Switch 2 ===
- Yakuza 0 Director's Cut (Sega) (Fantasy Zone, OutRun, Space Harrier, Super Hang-On)
- Metal Gear Solid: Master Collection Vol. 2 (Metal Gear: Ghost Babel) (Konami)
- Metal Slug Ultimate Collection (SNK)

=== Web browser ===
- E-mote

=== Windows ===
- Sakura Taisen (Sega)
- Mega Man X Legacy Collection (partial) (Capcom)
- Super Bomberman R (Konami)
- Castlevania Anniversary Collection (Konami)
- Contra Anniversary Collection (Konami)
- Koihime Enbu (Unknown Games)
- Koihime Enbu RyoRaiRai (Degica)
- Tokyo School Life
- The Men of Yoshiwara: Kikuya (Dogenzaka Lab)
- Namco Museum Archives (Bandai Namco Entertainment)
- Getsu Fuma Den (NES) (Konami)
- Castlevania Advance Collection (Konami)
- Darius Cozmic Collection (Taito)
- G-Darius HD (Taito)
- Yakuza 0 (retro minigames) (Sega)
- Yakuza 6: The Song of Life (retro minigames) (Sega)
- Lost Judgment (retro minigames) (Sega)
- Legend of Mana Remastered (Square Enix)
- Bloody Butterfly (Kadokawa)
- 8-Bit ADV Steins;Gate (Included with Steins;Gate Elite) (Mages.)
- Go Go Nippon ver.2015 (MangaGamer)
- Ray'z Arcade Chronology (Taito)
- Metal Gear Solid: Master Collection Vol. 1 (Metal Gear (NES), Snake's Revenge, Metal Gear Solid) (Konami)
- Castlevania Dominus Collection (Konami)
- Operation Night Strikers (Taito)
- Night Striker Gear
- Gradius Origins (Konami)
- Ganbare Goemon Daishūgō! (Konami)
- Metal Gear Solid: Master Collection Vol. 2 (Metal Gear: Ghost Babel) (Konami)
- Metal Slug Ultimate Collection (SNK)

=== PlayStation ===
- Doki Doki Poyacchio (Media Rings)

=== PlayStation 2 ===
- DigiCharat Fantasy Excellent (Broccoli)
- First Kiss Stories (Broccoli/Arcadia Entertainer)
- Oretachi Game Center Zoku: Yie Ar Kung-Fu
- Sega Ages 2500 Series Vol. 20: Space Harrier II: Space Harrier Complete Collection (Sega)
- Sega Ages 2500 Series Vol. 21: SDI & Quartet: Sega System 16 Collection (Sega)
- Sega Ages 2500 Series Vol. 24: Last Bronx: Toukyou Bangaichi (Sega)
- Sega Ages 2500 Series Vol. 25: Gunstar Heroes: Treasure Box (Sega)
- Sega Ages 2500 Series Vol. 28: Tetris Collection (Sega)
- Sega Ages 2500 Series Vol. 29: Monster World Complete Collection (Sega)
- Sega Ages 2500 Series Vol. 30: Galaxy Force II: Special Extended Edition (Sega)
- Sega Ages 2500 Series Vol. 31: Dennou Senki Virtual On (Sega)
- Sega Ages 2500 Series Vol. 32: Phantasy Star Complete Collection (Sega)
- Sega Ages 2500 Series Vol. 33: Fantasy Zone Complete Collection (Sega)
- Sega Rally 2006 (bonus Sega Rally Championship port) (Sega)

=== PlayStation 3 ===
- Akatsuki no Goei Trinity (AKABEiSOFT3/5pb.)
- Dengeki Bunko FIGHTING CLIMAX (Sega)
- NEOGEO Station (SNK Playmore)
- Capcom Arcade Cabinet (Capcom)
- DUNAMIS15 (5pb.)
- Koihime Enbu (Unknown Games)
- Castle of Illusion Starring Mickey Mouse (pre-order bonus for the 2013 remake, Sega Genesis/MD version) (Sega)
- Spelunker Collection (Tozai Games)

Sega Vintage Collection

- ToeJam & Earl (Sega)
- ToeJam & Earl in Panic on Funkotron (Sega)
- Wonder Boy in Monster Land (Sega)
- Wonder Boy in Monster World (Sega)
- Monster World IV (Sega)
- Alex Kidd in Miracle World (Sega)
- Revenge of Shinobi (Sega)
- Super Hang-On (Sega)

=== PlayStation 4 ===
- Dangun Feveron (Cave)
- Occultic;Nine (development assistance) (Mages.)
- ESP Ra.De. Psi (Cave)
- Battle Garegga Rev.2016 (Raizing)
- Sorcer Striker (Raizing)
- Ketsui: Kizuna Jigoku Tachi (Cave)
- Mega Man X Legacy Collection (partial) (Capcom)
- Castlevania Anniversary Collection (Konami)
- Contra Anniversary Collection (Konami)
- Yakuza 0 (retro minigames) (Sega)
- Yakuza 6: The Song of Life (retro minigames) (Sega)
- Super Bomberman R (Konami)
- Koihime Enbu RyoRaiRai (Degica)
- Namco Museum Archives (Bandai Namco Entertainment)
- Darius Cozmic Revelation (Taito, G-Darius HD, G-Darius Ver. 2 and Darius (Extra Version) only)
- Aleste Collection
- Castlevania Advance Collection (Konami)
- Toaplan Arcade Garage: Kyukyoku Tiger-Heli (Limited Run Games)
- Teki Paki
- Lost Judgment (retro minigames) (Sega)
- Legend of Mana Remastered (Square Enix)
- Ketsui Deathtiny -Kizuna Jigoku Tachi-
- Ray'z Arcade Chronology (Taito)
- Toaplan Arcade Garage: Hishou Same! Same! Same!
- Toaplan Arcade Garage: Zero Fire
- Metal Gear Solid: Master Collection Vol. 1 (Metal Gear (NES), Snake's Revenge, Metal Gear Solid) (Konami)
- Zaleste (Compile Heart)

=== PlayStation 5 ===
- Lost Judgment (retro minigames) (Sega)
- Metal Gear Solid: Master Collection Vol. 1 (Metal Gear (NES), Snake's Revenge, Metal Gear Solid) (Konami)
- Castlevania Dominus Collection (Konami)
- Zaleste (Compile Heart)
- Gradius Origins (Konami)
- Ganbare Goemon Daishūgō! (Konami)
- Metal Gear Solid: Master Collection Vol. 2 (Metal Gear: Ghost Babel) (Konami)
- Metal Slug Ultimate Collection (SNK)

=== PlayStation Portable ===
- Akatsuki no Goei Trinity (AKABEiSOFT3/5pb.)
- BEYOND THE FUTURE – FIX THE TIME ARROWS (5pb.)
- DUNAMIS15 (5pb.)
- Fight Ippatsu! Juden-chan!! CC (Russel)
- GA: Geijutsuka Art Design Class Slapstick WONDERLAND (Russel)
- Gradius Collection (Konami)
- Parodius Portable (Konami)
- ~MIYAKO~ Awayuki no Utage (Idea Factory/Latern Rooms)
- NEOGEO Station (SNK Playmore)
- Shining Hearts (Sega)
- Salamander Portable (Konami)
- Tenshin Ranman Happy GO Lucky!! (Russel)
- The King of Fighters Collection: The Orochi Saga (SNK Playmore)
- TwinBee Portable (Konami)

=== PlayStation Vita ===
- Dengeki Bunko FIGHTING CLIMAX (Sega)
- Plastic Memories (development assistance) (Mages.)
- Occultic;Nine (development assistance) (Mages.)
- Yakuza 0 Free Companion App for PlayStation Vita (retro minigames) (Sega)
- Spelunker Collection (Tozai Games)

=== Wii ===
- Virtual Console – Mega Drive, Master System, MSX, Arcade (Sega)

==== WiiWare ====
- Gradius ReBirth (Konami)
- Contra ReBirth (Konami)
- Castlevania: The Adventure ReBirth (Konami)

=== Wii U ===
- Super Smash Bros. for Wii U (music arrangements) (Nintendo)
- Virtual Console - Game Boy Advance (Nintendo)

=== Xbox 360 ===
- DUNAMIS15 (5pb.)
- Otomedius G (Konami)
- Mushihimesama Futari (CAVE)
- Capcom Arcade Cabinet (Capcom)
- Bug Princess 2 Ver 1.5 (CAVE)

Sega Vintage Collection

- Sega Vintage Collection: Golden Axe (Sega)
- Sega Vintage Collection: Streets of Rage (Sega)
- Sega Vintage Collection: Monster World (Sega)
- Sega Vintage Collection: Alex Kidd & Co. (Sega)
- Sega Vintage Collection: ToeJam & Earl (Sega)

=== Xbox One ===
- Battle Garegga Rev.2016
- Steins;Gate 0 (handled port) (Mages.)
- Occultic;Nine (development assistance) (Mages.)
- Dangun Feveron
- Mega Man X Legacy Collection (partial) (Capcom)
- Super Bomberman R (Konami)
- Castlevania Anniversary Collection (Konami)
- Contra Anniversary Collection (Konami)
- Namco Museum Archives (Bandai Namco Entertainment)
- Castlevania Advance Collection (Konami)
- Yakuza 0 (retro minigames) (Sega)
- Yakuza 6: The Song of Life (retro minigames) (Sega)
- Lost Judgment (retro minigames) (Sega)

=== Xbox Series X/S ===
- Lost Judgment (retro minigames) (Sega)
- Metal Gear Solid: Master Collection Vol. 1 (Metal Gear (NES), Snake's Revenge, Metal Gear Solid) (Konami)
- Castlevania Dominus Collection (Konami)
- Legend of Mana Remastered (Square Enix)
- Gradius Origins (Konami)
- Metal Gear Solid: Master Collection Vol. 2 (Metal Gear: Ghost Babel) (Konami)
- Metal Slug Ultimate Collection (SNK)
