= GEM Impact =

Japanese audio production studio

GEM Impact is an audio production studio founded by game composer and saxophonist Norihiko Hibino in 2005. It is located in Tokyo, Japan, and employs a number of composers, producers, and artists. Hibino's fluency in English has allowed him to take the GEM Impact brand to a worldwide platform, which is the basis for the studio's motto: "From Japan to worldwide."

The studio employs a number of composers, including Norihiko Hibino himself, Takahiro Izutani, Yoshitaka Suzuki, and Takahide Ayuzawa. They have often made use of the talents of artist Uetake MacARTHUR for their graphical needs.

While Norihiko Hibino is well known for his contributions to the Metal Gear Solid series, many were left wondering what role GEM Impact had on the score for Metal Gear Solid 4: Guns of the Patriots, as their contributions were not publicized. Hibino later revealed via an interview with Original Sound Version that GEM Impact in fact provided 90 minutes of music for the cinematic sequences in the game.

GEM Impact operates alongside GEM Factory, an in-house record label that has released two albums including The Outer Rim and the Ninja Blade Original Soundtrack. Vanilla Mood, a night club in Japan, was also operated under GEM Impact, but closed at the end of 2008.

On September 2, 2008, FromSoftware announced the ninja action title, Ninja Blade, and named Norihiko Hibino and GEM Impact as the composers for the title. The team has already completed the music for the title, totaling close to three hours of original music. Hibino noted in a preview article at Original Sound Version that he believes this project represents the studio's greatest achievement to date, and it is a landmark for the studio. On February 10, 2009, it was announced that the group would work alongside PlatinumGames sound director Masami Ueda and composer Hiroshi Yamaguchi on the company's action title Bayonetta.

== Staff ==
Norihiko Hibino (CEO, Composer, Producer, Saxophonist)
Takahiro Izutani (Composer)
Yoshitaka Suzuki (Composer)
Takahide Ayuzawa (Composer)

== Credits ==
2011

- Bandai Namco "Go Vacation" (Wii, worldwide) – music, rec coordination, US main theme
- Konami "Otomedius Excellent" (Xbox 360) - music, music arrangement

2009

- PlatinumGames "Bayonetta" (PS3/Xbox 360, worldwide) - music

2008

- Sammy "Unannounced Title" (Arcade, Japan) – music
- FromSoftware "Ninja Blade" (Xbox 360, worldwide) – music, main theme, ending theme
- Konami "Metal Gear Solid 4: Guns of the Patriots" (PS3, worldwide) – cinematic music
- Atlus "Etrian Odyssey II SUPER ARRANGE VERSION" (CD, Japan) – music arrangement, production
- Grasshopper Manufacture "No More Heroes" (Wii, worldwide) – main theme remix
- The Outer Rim "The Outer Rim" (CD, worldwide) – production (via GEM Factory)
- Capcom "1942" (Xbox Live Arcade, USA) – music
- Konami "Metal Gear Solid 2: Sons of Liberty Bande Dessinee" (DVD, worldwide) – music
- Konami "Beatmania 11DX 14 GOLD" (PS2, worldwide) – music
- Bandai Namco "The Idolmaster Fami-Song 8-bit" (CD, Japan) – lyrics, music
- Gonzo "Blassreiter" (anime, worldwide) – music
- Tochigi TV "The Sun" (TV, Japan) – music, main theme

2007

- Heiwa "Unannounced Title" (Arcade, Japan) – music, recording coordination
- Konami "Metal Gear Solid: Portable Ops Plus" (PSP, worldwide) – music
- Capcom "Commando 3" (Xbox Live Arcade, USA) – music
- Atlus "Etrian Odyssey SUPER ARRANGE VERSION" (CD, Japan) – music arrangement, production
- Konami "Metal Gear Solid Bande Dessinee 2" (PSP, worldwide) – music
- Konami "Metal Gear Music Collection" (CD, Japan) – music, production, orchestral recording (China)
- Yuki Koyangi "Sunrise" (CD, Japan) – lyrics, music, production
- Chihiro Yonekura "Lion's Song" (CD, Japan) – music
- Properst (http://www.properst.co.jp) (web corporate promotion, Japan) – music
- Marvelous Entertainment "Tokyo-Maj in Gakuen" (PS2, Japan) – sound design
- Tohokushinsha Film Corporation "Scary Nursery Rhymes" (movie, Japan) – music
- Konami "Pachi-Slot Beatmania" (Arcade, Japan) – music
- 10tacle "Boulder Dash" (DS, Europe) – music, sound design

2006

- Konami "Metal Gear Solid Portable Ops" (PSP, worldwide) – music
- SEGA "Yakuza 2" (PS2, worldwide) – music
- Spike "Elvandia Story" (PS2, worldwide) – music
- Konami "Rumble Roses XX" (Xbox 360, worldwide) – music
- Gonzo "ROBO ROCK" (anime, Japan) – music
- Capcom "Monster Hunter 3rd Anniversary Soundtrack (CD, Japan) – main theme remix
- Konami "Yu-Gi-Oh Online" (Xbox 360, USA/Europe) – music
- Konami "Thrill Drive 4" (arcade, worldwide) – music
