= Norihiko Hibino =

Japanese composer and saxophonist (born 1973)

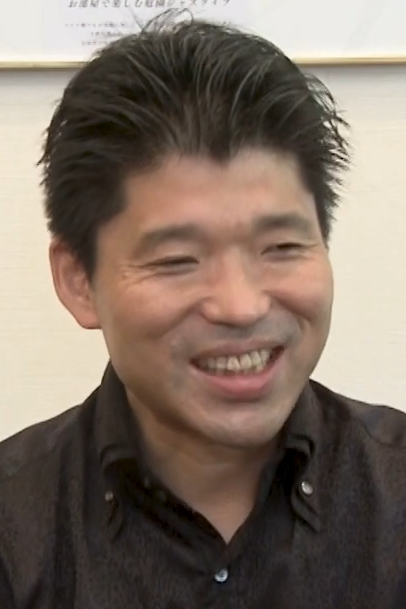
- Hibino in 2023
- Born: September 3, 1973 (age 52); Osaka, Japan
- Education: Osaka University; Berklee College of Music
- Occupations: Composer, saxophonist
- Years active: 1999–present
- Musical career
- Genres: Jazz, electronic, video game music
- Instruments: Saxophone, guitar, piano, tuba
- Label: Scarlet Moon Records

Norihiko Hibino (日比野 則彦, Hibino Norihiko; born September 3, 1973) is a Japanese video game composer and saxophonist.

== Biography ==
Hibino was born in Osaka. He graduated from the Osaka University School of Human Sciences in 1996. After graduating from Berklee College of Music in 1997, he moved to Kansas City to start a career as a solo jazz musician. He later relocated to Japan to work for Konami, where he became known for his work on Konami's Metal Gear Solid and Zone of the Enders video game series.

After working with Konami, Hibino started his own company, GEM Impact, which is a studio consisting of composers Takahiro Izutani, Yoshitaka Suzuki, Takahide Ayuzawa, and himself. An additional part of GEM Impact is GEM Factory, an in-house record label which has put out the debut album of The Outer Rim and the Ninja Blade soundtrack. Through GEM Impact, Hibino and his team have been able to work on games, anime, websites, and other projects that require music. While their involvement with Metal Gear Solid 4: Guns of the Patriots was not publicized by Konami, Hibino divulged in an interview with Original Sound Version that GEM Impact in fact provided approximately 90 minutes of music for the game's cinematic sequences. On September 2, 2008, Hibino and GEM Impact were announced to be the composers for the action title Ninja Blade.

In 2009, GEM Impact's in-house label, GEM Factory released the two-disc Ninja Blade soundtrack, and Hibino went on to found Hibino Sound Therapy Lab, a venture that explores the therapeutic applications of music. His first project under this company was Prescription for Sleep, an iPhone and iPod touch application that attempts to lure users to sleep with 20 minutes of soothing, live-recorded music. Hibino also teamed up with a Chinese producer to create Gentle Love, a light smooth jazz arrangement album of pop hits from China, Japan, and the US. Other activities included a panel at GDC 2009 about the game music business in Japan, two performance at the 2009 GANG Awards, performances of "Snake Eater" at Video Games Live in Singapore and Brazil, and a live performance of Gentle Love. GEM Impact also contributed to the score for Bayonetta. He was also awarded the Berklee "Distinguished Alumni" award for his entrepreneurial spirit and use of music in unconventional ways to reach a new audience.

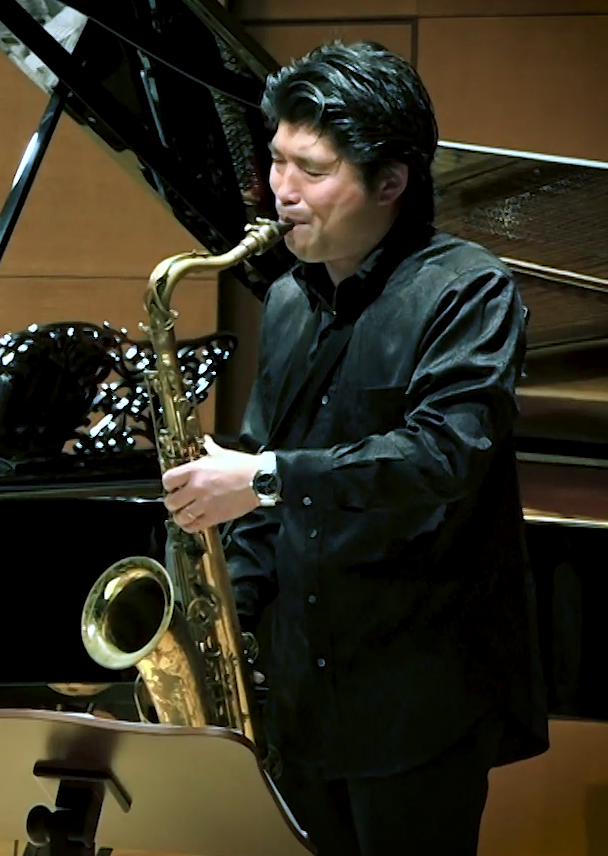
Hibino performing in 2023

After 2009, Hibino worked on fewer game projects and focused his energies on the therapeutic applications of music being explored through Hibino Sound Therapy Lab. He began recording material under the GENTLE LOVE moniker, featuring himself on saxophone and pianist Ayaki Sato (AYAKI) on piano. Several albums were recorded, including the Hibino Sound Therapy Lab Sound Library and Prescription for Sleep Volume 2. Over the next several years, Hibino would record solo harp, chamber groups, and more GENTLE LOVE to amass a library for his new therapeutic sound system called the RINSHU, which is a hand-carved sound system crafted by woodworkers in Japan in the likeness of a yacht. The system was released in Japan in 2014 and was patented and released in the United States in 2015.

After the 2011 Tōhoku earthquake and tsunami that struck Japan, Hibino and AYAKI toured the affected areas, performing free concerts to promote healing for those in need. This resulted in the creation of the Music in Heaven spiritual care events which have taken place all throughout Japan, combining musical performances, conceptual footage displayed on a large screen above the stage, and a wellness event. Music in Heaven, which began in 2013, celebrated 50 performances in 2015, and is still being regularly scheduled throughout Japan.

Hibino continued to maintain his ties with the game industry starting in 2014 with the launch of Prescription for Sleep: Game Music Lullabies, produced and published by Scarlet Moon Records. The series features Hibino and AYAKI teaming up as GENTLE LOVE to perform popular video game music to sleep and relax to. The series expanded to include Prescription for Sleep: Game Music Lullabies Volume II in 2015, a tribute to former Nintendo president Satoru Iwata and Hibino's mentor Eiki Oshiimi titled Prescription for Peace: A Tribute to the Departed, and a third full-length album titled Prescription for Sleep: Lullabies of Mana, dedicated to Secret of Mana. A fourth Prescription for Sleep album, announced on November 2, 2016 and released on December 1, 2016, featured arrangements from Undertale. In 2016, Hibino co-wrote the score for the animated short, Sinmara Saga, with composer Dale North.

== Works ==
Video games
Year	Title	Notes
2000	Metal Gear: Ghost Babel	
2001	Zone of the Enders	with Maki Kirioka, Akihiro Honda, Toshiyuki Kakuta, and Shuichi Kobori
2001	Metal Gear Solid 2: Sons of Liberty	with Harry Gregson-Williams
2002	Beatmania 6th Mix + Core Remix	
2002	Yu-Gi-Oh! Duel Monsters 7: The Duelcity Legend	
2002	The Document of Metal Gear Solid 2	opening theme
2002	Metal Gear Solid 2: Substance	additional in-game music
2003	Zone of the Enders: The 2nd Runner	with Maki Kirioka, Akihiro Honda, and Toshiyuki Kakuta
2003	Yu-Gi-Oh! Duel Monsters 8: False God of Destruction	
2003	Boktai: The Sun is in Your Hand	with Kazuki Muraoka, Masashi Watanabe, and Shuichi Kobori
2004	Metal Gear Solid: The Twin Snakes	with Steve Henifin, Toshiyuki Kakuta, Shuichi Kobori, and Waichiro Ozaki
2004	Yu-Gi-Oh! The Dawn of Destiny	with Waichiro Ozaki, Toshiyuki Kakuta, and Toshihisa Furusawa
2004	Boktai 2: Solar Boy Django	with several others
2004	Metal Gear Solid 3: Snake Eater	with Harry Gregson-Williams
2006	Elvandia Story	with Noriyuki Iwadare
2006	Rumble Roses XX	with Sota Fujimori, Michiru Yamane, and Akira Yamaoka
2006	Rogue Galaxy Premium Arrange	"The Ghost Ship"
2006	Metal Gear Solid: Portable Ops	with Akihiro Honda and Takahiro Izutani
2006	Yakuza 2	with Hidenori Shoji, Hideki Sakamoto, and Takahiro Izutani
2007	Wolf of the Battlefield: Commando 3	with Yoshitaka Suzuki and Takahiro Izutani
2008	1942: Joint Strike	
2008	Metal Gear Solid 4: Guns of the Patriots	cinematic music
2008	Sho Chiku Bai	
2008	Otomedius G	also producer
2009	Ninja Blade	with Yoshitaka Suzuki, Takahiro Izutani, and Takahide Ayuzawa
2009	Bayonetta	with several others
2011	Otomedius Excellent	
2011	Ace Combat: Assault Horizon	with several others
2011	Go Vacation	with Taku Inoue
2011	Shinobi 3D	with Yoshitaka Suzuki and Takahiro Izutani
2013	The Wonderful 101	with several others
2014	Bayonetta 2	with several others
2015	Persona 4: Dancing All Night	"Heaven (Norihiko Hibino Remix)"
2018	Oppaidius Summer Trouble!	guest composer
2018	Oppaidius Summer Trouble!	guest composer
2018	Tangledeep	guest composer
2019	Stoneshard	"Stoneshard"
2023	9 Years of Shadows	with Miguel Hasson, Michiru Yamane
2026	Mariachi Legends	with Miguel Hasson

Albums
Year	Title	Notes
2000	Now I'm Here to Hear...	
2005	AKASHI	
2007	Etrian Odyssey Super Arrange Version	arranger, producer
2008	Etrian Odyssey II Super Arrange Version	arranger, producer
2008	Live Music by Piano and Strings: Sekaiju no MeiQ I & II Super Arrange Version	arranger, producer
2008	No More Heroes Sound Tracks: Dark Side	arranger
2008	The Outer Rim	arranger, performer, producer
2009	Gentle Love	
2009	Hibino Sound Therapy Lab Sound Library	
2010	Gentle Love Vol. 2	

Other
Year	Title	Notes
2008	Blassreiter	
2016	Sinmara Saga	with Dale North
