= Kenta Miyake =

Japanese voice actor and narrator (born 1977)

- 三宅 健太
- Born: August 23, 1977 (age 49); Okinawa Prefecture, Japan
- Status: Married
- Other names: Miyaken; Shun Kazagiri
- Occupations: Voice actor; narrator
- Years active: 1999–present
- Agent: 81 Produce
- Notable work: Fullmetal Alchemist: Brotherhood as Scar; My Hero Academia as All Might; JoJo's Bizarre Adventure as Muhammad Avdol and Steven Steel; Pokémon as Giovanni; Sonic the Hedgehog as Vector the Crocodile; Street Fighter as Zangief; Final Fantasy XV as Gladiolus Amicitia; Kirby and the Forgotten Land as Leongar

Kenta Miyake (三宅 健太, Miyake Kenta; born August 23, 1977) is a Japanese voice actor and narrator. He is affiliated with 81 Produce.

== Biography ==
Miyake wanted to become a voice actor after admiring an actress. After attending the Amusement Media Research Institute and joining 81 Produce, he replaced several voice actors, including Masashi Amenomori, Daisuke Gōri, Nobuyuki Furuta, Unshō Ishizuka, Shigezō Sasaoka, Yuu Shimaka, Hirotaka Suzuoki, Kazuya Tatekabe, and Kiyoyuki Yanada. Miyake won the Best Actor in a Supporting Role award at the 13th Seiyu Awards.

== Filmography ==
=== Anime series ===
List of voice performances in anime
Year	Title	Role	Notes	Source
1999	Zoids: Chaotic Century	Various characters		
2000	Saiyuki	Demon		
2000	Gravitation	Entertainment reporter, Furyo	TV series	
2001	Salary Man Kintaro	Shirakubo		
2001	Tantei Shonen Kageman	Kaito de Aru, Kaito no Yon		
2001	Steel Angel Kurumi	Shugenja		
2001	Offside	Inoue, Jotaro Ishihara, Joji Inoue		
2001	Banner of the Stars II	Trekses' captain		
2002	Mirage of Blaze	College student		
2002	MegaMan NT Warrior	Count Elec/Jack Elecitel, WhaleMan, LeagueMan		
2002	Digimon Frontier	Dynasmon		
2002	Heat Guy J	Giovanni Garo		
2002–2004	Ghost in the Shell: Stand Alone Complex	Jiei-kan (self-defense official), Individual 11 Member	Also 2nd Gig	
2002–2007	Naruto	Jirobo		
2002	Pokémon: Advanced	Dome Superstar Heath, Satoshi's Donfan	2nd TV series	
2003	Wolf's Rain	Tsume		
2003	Tank Knights Fortress	Cannon Gum		
2003	Zentrix	Zeus		
2003	Sonic X	Vector the Crocodile		
2003	Zatch Bell!	Garza, Rein		
2003	Croket!	Aburami		
2003	Last Exile	Jim		
2003–2010	Ikki Tousen series	Narrator, Shigi Taishiji, Kanshou Kochuu, Genka Harada		
2003	Avenger	Gates		
2003	MegaMan NT Warrior: Axess	Count Elec/Jack Elecitel, JunkMan, WhaleMan		
2003	The Galaxy Railways	Heidel Demarck		
2003	Gungrave	Nathan, Cain		
2003	Mirmo!	Kaijin Fukuwarai		
2003	Tsukihime, Lunar Legend	Nero Chaos		
2003	Bobobo-bo Bo-bobo	Maiteru, Sparkman, Goemon Ishikawa, Crimson		
2004	Mezzo DSA	Kira		
2004	Transformers: Energon	Landmine, Omega Supreme		
2004	Jing, King of Bandits: Seventh Heaven	Big inmate		
2004	Koi Kaze	Koshiro Saeki		
2004	Tenjho Tenge	Kouji Sagara		
2004	Kyo Kara Maoh!	Furyo		
2004	Initial D: Fourth Stage	Ishii		
2004	Duel Masters Charge	Chappy		
2004	Kurau Phantom Memory	Ayaka's husband		
2004	Otogi Zoshi	Watanabe no Tsuna		
2004	New Getter Robo	Kintoki Sakata	OVA eps. 3-4	
2004	Beet the Vandel Buster	Arusaido		
2004	Onmyō Taisenki	Byakko no rangetsu, Daikōjin kogenda, Dai kongou, Mamono		
2004	MegaMan NT Warrior: Stream	Count Elec/Jack Elecitel		
2004	Zoids: Fuzors	Barafu		
2004	Desert Punk	Bad guy, Hashimoto, Norio's father		
2004	Bleach	Shiroganehiko, Soul Reaper, Charlotte Chuhlhourne		
2004–2012	Major series	Toku, Tazio Saotome, Fox, Gordon, Wilson		
2005	Starship Operators	Aide		
2005	Buzzer Beater	Skinhead		
2005	Majime ni Fumajime: Kaiketsu Zorori	Various characters		
2005	Twin Princess of Wonder Planet	Huang		
2005	The Law of Ueki	Otoko Hiramaru		
2005	Best Student Council	Haruo Sumimoto		
2005	Futakoi Alternative	Kinoshita		
2005	Zoids: Genesis	Garaga		
2005	Honey and Clover	Kazuo Aida		
2005	Strawberry Marshmallow	Ana's father, Ana's grandfather		
2005	Shuffle!	RRR Personnel		
2005	Guyver: The Bioboosted Armor	Zerbebuth		
2005	Idaten Jump	Masaji		
2005	MegaMan NT Warrior: Beast	Zoano JunkMan, Zoano WhaleMan		
2005	Tōhai Densetsu Akagi: Yami ni Maiorita Tensai	Yoshioka, Yamazaki, Tahara, others		
2005	Cluster Edge	Worker		
2005	Hell Girl	Yoshiyuki Kusunoki		
2005	IGPX	Zanack Strauss	TV series	
2005–2011	Shakugan no Shana series	Sydonay / Senpen Shudonai		
2005	Black Cat	Garomu, Black clad man		
2005	Noein	Isuka, Mayuzumi Takuya		
2005	One Piece	Zambai, Morley		
2006	Kiba	Police C		
2006	Glass Fleet	Bombay		
2006	.hack//Roots	Tawayara, Tota		
2006	Witchblade	Tetsu Nakata		
2006–2007	Spider Riders	Stags	Also Yamigeru Taiyou	
2006	Black Lagoon	Corporal Menshov, Yoshida, Quentin, others		
2006	MegaMan NT Warrior: Beast+	Count Elec/Jack Elecitel		
2006	The Third	Kevin		
2006	Coyote Ragtime Show	Super Soul		
2006	Tona-Gura!	Katsuki's father		
2006	Innocent Venus	Steve		
2006	Pokémon the Series: Diamond and Pearl	Sakaki, Akagi, Enta, Satoshi's Donfan, Shinji's Elekid/Eleboo/Elekible, Hyouta's Rampald	Third TV series	
2006	Pumpkin Scissors	Randell Orlando		
2006	D.Gray-man	Sukkin Borikku		
2006	Ghost Slayers Ayashi	Kano Masanoshin		
2006	Kekkaishi	Gagin		
2006	Tokyo Tribe 2	Mera		
2007	Naruto: Shippuden	Akatsuchi, Tekuno Kanden		
2007	Moonlight Mile 1st season: Lift Off	Alan		
2007	GeGeGe no Kitaro	Satake, Akira, Wa Nyudo (wheel priest)	Fifth TV series	
2007	Gurren Lagann	Gyuzakku		
2007–2008	My Bride Is a Mermaid series	Seto Gouzaburou		
2007–2013	Hayate the Combat Butler series	Seishirou Klaus		
2007	El Cazador de la Bruja	Douglas Rosenberg		
2007	Wangan Midnight	Jun Kitami		
2007	Baccano!	Berga Gandor		
2007	Neuro: Supernatural Detective	Taiki Nishimura		
2007	Mameushikun	Wolf		
2007	Rental Magica	Tatsumi Shito		
2007	Indian Summer	Tetsuji Sumitomo	OVA	
2007	Let's Go! Tamagotchi	Oyajitchi, Gumatchi		
2008	Shigofumi: Letters from the Departed	Saizo Kiyosumi		
2008	Macross Frontier	Bobby Margot, Ranzou Saotome		
2008	Amatsuki	Suo		
2008	Kirarin Revolution Stage-3	Kintaro Yukino		
2008	To Love-Ru	Mojack		
2008	Blassreiter	Herman Zarutsua		
2008	Duel Masters Cross	Chappy		
2008–2011	Penguin no Mondai series	Gordon Watanabe, Demon Boss, Mr. Beckham, Narration, Penguin boss, Zeus, Child Polar Bear		
2008	Psychic Squad	Muscle Okama, Koremitsu Yamada		
2008	Soul Eater	White Star		
2008	Top Secret ~The Revelation~	Tsunehiko Sasaki		
2008	Junjo Romantica: Pure Romance series	Tanaka		
2008	Golgo 13	Thomas	TV series	
2008	CHIKO, Heiress of the Phantom Thief	Muta		
2008	Kyōran Kazoku Nikki	Dogon		
2008	Slayers Revolution	Hohei		
2008	Battle Spirits: Shounen Toppa Bashin	Macho		
2008	Casshern Sins	Robot		
2008	Rosario + Vampire Capu2	Yeti		
2008	Legends of the Dark King	Uiguru		
2008	Kannagi: Crazy Shrine Maidens	Reiri Ryojo		
2008	The Earl and the Fairy	Slade		
2008	Mōryō no Hako	Language teacher, worker		
2008	Chaos;Head	Genichi Norose		
2008	Tytania	Ajman Tytania		
2008	Negi bozu no Asataro	Tonaro no gonta		
2009	Rideback	Ryoku Yamamoto		
2009	Phantom ~Requiem for the Phantom~	Wallace		
2009	Fullmetal Alchemist: Brotherhood	Scar, Garfield		
2009–2012	Beyblade: Metal Fusion	Benkei Hanawa / Masked Bull	Also Metal Fury, Metal Masters, Shogun Steel	
2009	Sōten Kōro	Riretsu, Yue Jin		
2009	Saint Seiya: The Lost Canvas	Dohko	OVA	
2009	Tatakau Shisho: The Book of Bantorra	Mince Chezain		
2009	Darker than Black: Gemini of the Meteor	Genma Shizume		
2009	Tamagotchi!	Gumatchi		
2010	The Qwaser of Stigmata	Golden Stigmata (Gregory)		
2010	Mobile Suit Gundam Unicorn	Conroy Hagensen	OVA	
2010	Giant Killing	Hauer		
2010	Lilpri	Tarō Atsui		
2010	Ōkami-san	Boss		
2010	MonHun Nikki Girigiri Airū-mura series	Instructor		
2010	Battle Spirits: Brave	Iorasu		
2010	Pokémon the Series: Black & White	Sakaki, Satoshi's Waruvile, (Sunglasses Meguroco/Waruvile), Shooty's Dokkorer/Roubushin, Langley's Tunbear	4th TV series, 1st arc	
2010	Panty & Stocking with Garterbelt	Blood Fudo, Gall Ghoul		
2010	Otome Yōkai Zakuro	Village chief		
2010	A Certain Magical Index II	Ritoku Komaba		
2011	Dream Eater Merry	Hercules		
2011	Is This a Zombie?	Zari		
2011	Air Gear: Break on the Sky	Buccha	OVA series	
2011	Tiger & Bunny	Chuckman		
2011	Hanasaku Iroha	Sabagema A		
2011	Kaiji	Seikya		
2011	Sket Dance	Fukura Takemitsu		
2011–2013	Pretty Rhythm series	Penguin-sensei, Yamao Yamada, Sentaro Fukuhara, Tanaka-san		
2011	Aria the Scarlet Ammo	Vlad		
2011	Sacred Seven	Makoto's father		
2011	Twin Angel: Twinkle Paradise	Red Beret		
2011	Kamisama Dolls	Atsushi Kuga		
2011	Blood-C	Furuki Mono		
2011	The Mystic Archives of Dantalian	Red-haired Man		
2011	Bakuman	Fukura	Season 2	
2011–2013	Phi Brain: Puzzle of God series	Funga		
2011	Sekai-ichi Hatsukoi	Tanaka	Season 2	
2011	Mobile Suit Gundam AGE	Don Voyage		
2011	Un-Go	Teishin Yamamoto		
2012	Tantei Opera Milky Holmes: Act 2	Director		
2012	High School DxD	Mii-tan		
2012	Bodacious Space Pirates	Schnitzer		
2012	Listen to Me, Girls. I Am Your Father!	Hanamura-senpai		
2012	Rock Lee & His Ninja Pals	Jirobo		
2012	Sword Art Online	Eugene		
2012	Accel World	Enemy B		
2012	Transformers: Prime	Shockwave		
2012	Pokémon: Black & White: Rival Destinies	Sakaki, Satoshi's Waruvile/Waruvial, Langley's Tunbear	4th TV series 2nd arc	
2012	Upotte!!	Springfield		
2012	Kyōkaisen-jō no Horizon Season 2	Diego Velázquez		
2012	Code Geass: Akito the Exiled	Michele Manfredi	OVA series	
2012	Street Fighter X Tekken Vita: Episode Series	Eddy Gordo	OVA series	
2012	Chōsoku Henkei Gyrozetter	Commander-in-Chief Hisaishi		
2012	The Pet Girl of Sakurasou	Security guard		
2012	Psycho-Pass	Koichi Ashikaga		
2013	Maoyu	Azuma no Saisho	TV series	
2013	Boku wa Tomodachi ga Sukunai NEXT	Koyomi Fujioka		
2013	Beast Saga	Garrison G		
2013	Pokémon: Black & White: Adventures in Unova and Beyond	Satoshi's Waruvial	4th TV Series 3rd arc	
2013	The Devil Is a Part-Timer!	Kyuryu		
2013	Yondemasuyo, Azazel-san Z	Reika, Moloch		
2013	Gargantia on the Verdurous Planet	Okama		
2013	Pokémon: Black & White: Adventures in Unova and Beyond	Sakaki, Satoshi's Waruvial	4th TV Series, 4th arc	
2013	Attack on Titan	Mike Zacharias		
2013	Strike the Blood	Rudolph Eustach		
2013	Gundam Build Fighters	Gonda Monta		
2013	Pokémon the Series: XY	Sakaki, Monsieur Pierre, Kojirō's Maaiika	5th TV Series, 1st arc	
2014–2015	Future Card Buddyfight	Genma Goki, Erufu Hanasobi	Also 100	
2014	SoniAni: Super Sonico The Animation	Kakazu		
2014	Blade & Soul	Ganza		
2014–2015	JoJo's Bizarre Adventure: Stardust Crusaders	Muhammad Avdol	Also Battle in Egypt arc	
2014	Brynhildr in the Darkness	Executive		
2014	Dragon Collection	Taiko no kami		
2014	Argevollen	Conrad Daniels		
2014	Monthly Girls' Nozaki-kun	Ken Miyamae		
2014	Nobunaga Concerto	Sassa Narimasa		
2014	The Seven Deadly Sins	Tsuigo		
2015	Tokyo Ghoul √A	Chū Hachikawa		
2015	Assassination Classroom	Akira Takaoka		
2015	Aldnoah.Zero	Olga	Season 2	
2015	Maria the Virgin Witch	Yvain		
2015	Yatterman Night	Tonzra		
2015	Blood Blockade Battlefront	Younger brother in movie	Ep. 5	
2015	Plastic Memories	Shinonome		
2015	The Heroic Legend of Arslan	Kubad		
2015	Shimoneta: A Boring World Where the Concept of Dirty Jokes Doesn't Exist	Raiki Gōriki		
2015–present	Overlord	Cocytus	Eps. 1-3, 11-13	
2015	Seiyu's Life!	Kaibara-san		
2015	Pokémon the Series: XYZ	Sakaki, Monsieur Pierre, Satoshi's Onvern, Kojirō's Maaiika	5th TV series, 2nd arc	
2015	Mobile Suit Gundam: The Origin	Dozle Zabi		
2015	Comet Lucifer	Hajime Do Mon		
2016	Danganronpa 3: The End of Kibōgamine Gakuen	Great Gozu		
2016–2025	My Hero Academia	Toshinori "All Might" Yagi		
2016	Schwarzesmarken	Walther Kruger		
2016	New Game!	Dandy Max	Ep. 9	
2016	Mobile Suit Gundam: Iron-Blooded Orphans	Galan Mossa	ep.30	
2016–2017	Time Bokan 24	Suzukkir		
2016	Pokémon the Series: Sun & Moon	Sakaki, Satoshi's Meltan, Kaki's Bakugames	6th TV series	
2016	Re:Zero – Starting Life in Another World	Kadomon Risch		
2017	Idol Time PriPara	Babario Ohkandagawa, Takki		
2017	New Game!!	Dandy Max	Ep. 2	
2017	Angel's 3Piece!	Kenta Ogi		
2017	Mahojin Guru Guru	Minaji	Ep. 21-22, 24	
2018	Death March to the Parallel World Rhapsody	Demon Lord		
2018	Banana Fish	Cain Blood		
2018	Radiant	Torque		
2018	Boruto: Naruto Next Generations	Akatsuchi, Boro		
2019	Mob Psycho 100 II	Hiroshi Shibata	Ep. 9-10	
2019	Isekai Quartet	Cocytus		
2019	7 Seeds	Akiwo Haza		
2019	Dororo	Hibukuro		
2019	Chihayafuru 3	Hideo Harada		
2020	22/7	Aoi Gōda		
2020	Breakers	Ken Narita/Narrator		
2020	Tower of God	Rak Wraithraiser		
2020	Golden Kamuy 3rd Season	Maiharu Gansoku		
2021	Back Arrow	Tae Howa		
2021	SK8 the Infinity	Shadow		
2021	Vlad Love	Masumi Katsuno		
2021	Godzilla Singular Point	Michael Steven		
2021	Shadows House	Joseph		
2021	"Deji" Meets Girl	Kaisei Higa		
2021	Banished from the Hero's Party	Danan		
2021	Ranking of Kings	Boss		
2022	The Greatest Demon Lord Is Reborn as a Typical Nobody	Lizer Bellphoenix		
2022	Harem in the Labyrinth of Another World	Allen		
2022	Mamekichi Mameko NEET no Nichijō	Komachi, Cousin Kichi		
2022	Urusei Yatsura	Onsen Mark		
2023	The Fire Hunter	Yuoshichi		
2023	Pokémon Horizons: The Series	Murdock		
2023	The Eminence in Shadow	Quinton		
2023	Magical Destroyers	Marcus		
2023	Zom 100: Bucket List of the Dead	Gonzou Kosugi		
2023	My Happy Marriage	Masashi Ookaito		
2023	Captain Tsubasa: Junior Youth Arc	Hermann Kaltz		
2023	Jujutsu Kaisen Season 2	Dagon		
2023	Zenryoku Usagi	Boss		
2024	Shaman King: Flowers	Ryūji Ichihara		
2024	The Weakest Tamer Began a Journey to Pick Up Trash	Oguto		
2024	Brave Bang Bravern!	Hal King		
2024	Kingdom	Ba Tei/Ma Cheng		
2024	Kaiju No. 8	Kaiju No. 10		
2024	I Parry Everything	Dundarg		
2024	The Ossan Newbie Adventurer	Broughston Ashorc		
2024	No Longer Allowed in Another World	Elton		
2025	I'm a Noble on the Brink of Ruin, So I Might as Well Try Mastering Magic	Guy		
2025	My Hero Academia: Vigilantes	Toshinori Yagi/All Might		
2025	Witch Watch	Burst		
2025	Clevatess	Holgas		
2025	Let's Play	Samuel A. Young		
2026	Rooster Fighter	Keiji		
2026	The Strongest Job Is Apparently Not a Hero or a Sage, but an Appraiser (Provisional)!	Claude		
2026	Steel Ball Run: JoJo's Bizarre Adventure	Steven Steel, Urmd Avdul	ONA	
2026	The Elusive Samurai	Mochizuki Shigenobu		
2026	Yu-Gi-Oh! Card Game The Chronicles	Sargas	ONA	
2027	Mercedes and the Waning Moon	Benkei		
2027	Soara and the House of Monsters	Ganshō		

=== Anime films ===
List of voice performances in feature films
Year	Title	Role	Notes	Source
2002	Island of Lost Digimon	Grizzmon		
2005	The Princess in the Birdcage Kingdom	Chief bodyguard		
2006	Pokémon Ranger and the Temple of the Sea	Satoshi's Donfan, Guijeau		
2007	Pokémon: The Rise of Darkrai	Gordy		
2007	Tamagotchi: The Movie	Memepapatchi		
2008	Pokémon: Giratina and the Sky Warrior	Home delivery man		
2009	Pokémon: Arceus and the Jewel of Life	Gishin's Heatran		
2009	A Penguin's Troubles	Gordon Watanabe		
2009	Macross Frontier: Itsuwari no Utahime	Bobby Margot		
2009	Professor Layton and the Eternal Diva	Marco Brock		
2010	Detective Conan: The Lost Ship in the Sky	Red Siamese Cat member		
2010	Pokémon—Zoroark: Master of Illusions	Entei		
2010	Redline	Deizuna brother		
2010	Mardock Scramble: The First Compression	Minchi the Wink		
2011	Macross Frontier: Sayonara no Tsubasa	Bobby Margot		
2012	Berserk: The Golden Age Arc I - The Egg of the King	Nosferatu Zodd		
2012	Puka Puka Juju	Papa		
2012	Berserk: The Golden Age Arc II - The Battle for Doldrey	Zodd		
2012	Pokémon the Movie: Kyurem vs. the Sword of Justice	Station attendant		
2012	Macross FB 7: Ore no Uta o Kike!	Bobby Margot	Crossover feature film	
2013	Berserk: The Golden Age Arc III - Descent	Zodd		
2014	Bodacious Space Pirates: Abyss of Hyperspace	Schnitzer		
2014	Pretty Rhythm All-Star Selection: Prism Show☆Best Ten	Penguin-sensei		
2014	Pokémon the Movie: Diancie and the Cocoon of Destruction	Kojirō's Maaiika, Joke (Allotrope)		
2014	Expelled from Paradise	Isaak		
2015	Pokémon the Movie: Hoopa and the Clash of Ages	Kyuremu, Kojirō's Maaiika	Also Pikachu to Pokemon Ongakutai short	
2016	In This Corner of the World	Bakemon		
2017	Pokémon the Movie: I Choose You!	Sakaki		
2018	Batman Ninja	Bane		
2018	My Hero Academia: Two Heroes	All Might		
2019	My Hero Academia: Heroes Rising	All Might		
2019	The Legend of the Galactic Heroes: Die Neue These Seiran	Nguyen Van Huu		
2019	Mewtwo Strikes Back: Evolution	Sakaki		
2020	Saezuru Tori wa Habatakanai – The Clouds Gather	Atsushi Ryūzaki		
2021	My Hero Academia: World Heroes' Mission	Toshinori Yagi		
2022	The First Slam Dunk	Takenori Akagi		
2024	My Hero Academia: You're Next	Dark Might		
2024	Wonderful Precure! The Movie!	Mujina		
2025	ChaO	King Neptunus		
2026	Armored Trooper VOTOMS: Die Graue Hexe	Matt Hummels		

=== Drama CD ===
List of voice performances in drama CDs
Title	Role	Notes	Source
Devil May Cry	Master	Drama CD	
Kami-sama no Memo-chō	Yondaime	Drama CD	
Macross Frontier	Bobby Margot	Drama CD, radio show	
Macross F Nyan Dra series		Talk CD	
My Bride Is a Mermaid			

=== Live action ===
List of voice performances in live action
Year	Title	Role	Notes	Source
2001	Hyakujuu Sentai Gaoranger: Fire Mountain Roars	Zeus Org	Movie	
2002	Kamen Rider Agito	El of the Earth	Eps. 49-51	
2004	Tokusou Sentai Dekaranger	Anrian Beildon	Ep. 5	
2006	GoGo Sentai Boukenger	Furious Fiend Gai/Quester Gai	Eps. 17-18 (Nomal), 19-20, 23, 28, 31, 33-34, 36, 39-42 (Quester)	
2006	GoGo Sentai Boukenger the Movie: The Greatest Precious	Quester Gai	Movie	
2009	Kamen Rider Decade	Alligator Imagin	Ep. 14-15	
2010	Kamen Rider OOO	Kabuto Yummy	Ep. 17	
2012	Tokumei Sentai Go-Busters	Spannerloid	Ep. 19	
2013	Zyuden Sentai Kyoryuger	Debo Yakigonte	Ep. 7	
2014	Ressha Sentai ToQger	Ring Shadow	Ep. 18	
2021	Kikai Sentai Zenkaiger	Bullfighting World, Great Bullfighting World	Ep. 22	

=== Video games ===
List of voice performances in video games
Year	Title	Role	Notes	Source
2001	Final Fantasy X	Biran		
2002	Atelier Judie: The Alchemist of Gramnad	Martin Chrome, Bora Couvuere		
2003	Atelier Viorate: The Alchemist of Gramnad 2 ヴィオラートのアトリエ 〜グラムナートの錬金術士2〜	Rolando Orphan		
2003	Croket! 2: Yami no Bank to Ban Joou	Aburami		
2003	Croket! 3: Granyuu Oukoku no Nazo	Aburami		
2003–present	Sonic the Hedgehog series	Vector the Crocodile		
2004	Tetsujin 28-go	X-dan, Jieitai, Keikan		
2004	Croket! 4: Bank no Mori no Mamorigami	Aburami		
2004	ZOIDS VS. III	Gizoku		
2004	Star Princess 3	Isora		
2004	Zatch Bell! Mamodo Fury	Garza		
2005	Tengai Makyō III: Namida 天外魔境III NAMIDA	Hyaku-bai no dokuro shōgun		
2005	Mega Man Zero 4	Kraft		
2005	Beet the Vandel Buster: Darkness Century	Arusaido		
2005	Atelier Iris 2: The Azoth of Destiny	Gray		
2005	Jingai Makyō	Yukiten		
2005	Yakuza	Yuya		
2005	Croket! DS: Tenkuu no Yuushatachi	Aburami		
2005	Mega Man Maverick Hunter X	Armor Armarge, Burnin' Noumander		
2006	Onimusha: Dawn of Dreams	Shimasako		
2006	Shakugan no Shana	Shudonai		
2006	Gunparade Orchestra: Midori no Shou	Masaaki Kokubu		
2006	Gunparade Orchestra: Ao no Shou	Masaaki Kokubu		
2006	Phantasy Star Universe	Noboru		
2006	Summon Night 4	Kuraure		
2006	Yakuza 2	Yuya		
2007	VitaminX	Eitaro Kyu		
2007	Elvandia Story	Valmont		
2007	Case Closed: The Mirapolis Investigation	Shunsaku Ogino		
2007	Growlanser VI: Precarious World	Hoffman		
2007	Dragon Quest Swords: The Masked Queen and the Tower of Mirrors	Shiren no kishi, Aukdemon, Kiraamazu		
2007	Touhai Densetsu - Akagi DS: Yami ni Maiorita Tensai	Yoshioka		
2007	Phantasy Star Universe: Ambition of the Illuminus	Noboru		
2008	Hayate no Gotoku! Ojousama Produce Daisakusen Boku Iro ni Somare! Gakkou-Hen	Seishirou Klaus		
2008	Hayate no Gotoku! Ojousama Produce Daisakusen Boku Iro ni Somare! Oyashiki-Hen	Seishirou Klaus		
2008	Chaos;Head	Genichi Norose		
2008	Super Robot Taisen OG Saga: Endless Frontier	Bonnie Makushimado		
2008	Fushigi Yūgi: Suzaku Ibun	Mitsukake		
2008–present	Street Fighter series	Zangief		
2008	Phantasy Star Portable	Noboru		
2008	Zettai Karen Children DS: Dai-4 no Children	J.D. Grisham, Muscle Ogama		
2008	D.Gray-man: Sousha no Shikaku	Skin Borikku		
2008	Ayakashi no Miya 妖ノ宮	Imari Koshiba 子柴伊摩利		
2008	Tales of Hearts	Byrocks Burroughs		
2008	Suikoden Tierkreis	Vuazorofu		
2009	Legends of the Dark King	Uiguru		
2009	Yakuza 3	Yuya		
2009	Ba ni shi ~yu!~ Oppai no kieta ōkoku ~ ばにしゅ！～おっぱいの消えた王国～	Komori	as Shun Kazagiri	
2009	Dengeki Gakuen RPG: Cross of Venus	Shudonai		
2009	Hayate no Gotoku! Nightmare Paradise	Seishirou Klaus		
2009	Killzone 2	Rico Velasquez	Japanese dub	
2009	Fullmetal Alchemist: Akatsuki no Ōji	Scar		
2009	Fullmetal Alchemist: Senka wo Takuseshi Mono	Scar		
2009	Fullmetal Alchemist: Tasogare no Shōjo	Scar		
2010	Zangeki no Reginleiv	Herugi		
2010	No Fate! Only the Power of Will	Ichihara Hiro Mitsuru 市原広満		
2010	.hack//Link	Trommel		
2010–2012	Sangoku Ren Senki Otome no Heiho 三国恋戦記 ～オトメの兵法！～	Genjo		
2010	Fullmetal Alchemist: To the Promised Day	Scar		
2010	Neo Geo Heroes: Ultimate Shooting	Marco Rossi		
2010	Another Century's Episode: R	Bobby Margot		
2010	Zac to Ombra: Maboroshi no Yuuenchi	Anton		
2010	Solatorobo: Red the Hunter	Garrett		
2010	Garen Miyako 雅恋 〜MIYAKO〜	Nanban		
2010	Ni no Kuni: Dominion of the Dark Djinn	Solon		
2011	Macross Triangle Frontier	Bobby Margot		
2011	Atelier Viorate: The Alchemist of Gramnad 2: The Memories of Ultramarine ヴィオラートのアトリエ 〜グラムナートの錬金術士2〜	Rolando Orphan	PSP version	
2011	Killzone 3	Rico Velasquez		
2011	Morobito Kozorite もろびとこぞりて	Tetsuo Erihara	Adult PC, as Shun Kazagiri	
2011–present	Dead or Alive series	Bass Armstrong	Replacing Daisuke Gōri, who died in 2010	
2011	Terror of the Stratus	Shozo Genda		
2011	Ni no Kuni: Wrath of the White Witch	Solon, Claude		
2012	E.X. Troopers	Walter Stingray		
2012	Call of Duty: Black Ops II	Mike Harper	Japanese dub	
2013	Issho ni Gohan Portable	Gunji Tomoba		
2013	Tales of Hearts R	Byrocks Burroughs		
2013	Horizon in the Middle of Nowhere Portable	Diego Velazquez		
2013	Super Robot Wars Operation Extend	Bobby Margot		
2013	VitaminR	Bruno Veron		
2013	Call of Duty: Ghosts	Thomas A. Merrick	Japanese dub	
2013	Granblue Fantasy	Deli Ford		
2014	Oreshika: Tainted Bloodlines			
2014	Lost Dimension	George Jackman		
2014	Naruto Shippuden: Ultimate Ninja Storm Revolution	Akatsuchi, Jirobo		
2015	Kenka Bancho 6: Soul & Blood	Eisuke Ishibashi		
2015	Sword Art Online: Lost Song	Eugene		
2015	Future Card Buddyfight: yūjō no bakunetsu faito!	Genma Goki		
2015	5-nin no Koi Prince: Himitsu no Keiyaku Kekkon	Ukon		
2015	JoJo's Bizarre Adventure: Eyes of Heaven	Muhammad Avdol	PS3/PS4	
2016	Final Fantasy XV	Gladiolus Amicitia		
2016	BlazBlue: Central Fiction	Susano'o		
2016	Samurai Warriors: Spirit of Sanada	Masayuki Sanada		
2018	God of War	Kratos	Japanese dub	
2018	BlazBlue: Cross Tag Battle	Susano'o	Japanese dub	
2019	Ace Combat 7: Skies Unknown	Wiseman		
2019	Nioh 2	Hachisuka Koroku		
2019	Astral Chain	Maximilian "Max" Howard		
2020	Resident Evil 3	Nicholai Ginovaef		
2020	Final Fantasy VII Remake	Roche		
2021	Phantasy Star Online 2: New Genesis	Garoa		
2022	Kirby and the Forgotten Land	Leongar		
2022	JoJo's Bizarre Adventure: All Star Battle R	Mohammed Avdol		
2022	God of War Ragnarok	Kratos	Japanese dub	
2023	Ys X: Nordics	Dogi		
2024	DECAPOLICE	Granger Boston		
2024	Like a Dragon: Infinite Wealth	Yuya		
2024	Final Fantasy VII Rebirth	Roche		
2024	Unicorn Overlord	Hodrick		
2026	Final Fantasy Resonance	Veritas of the Flame		

== Dubbing roles ==
=== Live action Japanese dubbing ===
Title	Role	Voice dub for	Notes	Source
Thor	Thor	Chris Hemsworth		
The Cabin in the Woods	Curt Vaughan	Chris Hemsworth		
The Avengers	Thor	Chris Hemsworth		
Thor: The Dark World	Thor	Chris Hemsworth		
Avengers: Age of Ultron	Thor	Chris Hemsworth		
Blackhat	Nicholas Hathaway	Chris Hemsworth		
In the Heart of the Sea	Owen Chase	Chris Hemsworth		
Vacation	Stone Crandall	Chris Hemsworth		
Doctor Strange	Thor	Chris Hemsworth	Cameo	
Thor: Ragnarok	Thor	Chris Hemsworth		
12 Strong	Captain Mitch Nelson	Chris Hemsworth		
Avengers: Infinity War	Thor	Chris Hemsworth		
Avengers: Endgame	Thor	Chris Hemsworth		
Extraction	Tyler Rake	Chris Hemsworth		
Thor: Love and Thunder	Thor	Chris Hemsworth		
Spiderhead	Steve Abnesti	Chris Hemsworth		
Extraction 2	Tyler Rake	Chris Hemsworth		
Furiosa: A Mad Max Saga	Warlord Dementus	Chris Hemsworth		
Crime 101	Mike Davis	Chris Hemsworth		
Avengers: Doomsday	Thor	Chris Hemsworth		
42	Jackie Robinson	Chadwick Boseman		
Abraham Lincoln: Vampire Hunter	Will Johnson	Anthony Mackie		
The Accidental Spy	Doctor			
Ace Ventura: Pet Detective	Emilio	Tone Loc	2025 BS10 Star Channel edition	
Alcatraz	Guy Hastings	Jim Parrack		
Amores perros	Ramiro	Marco Pérez		
Arrow	John Diggle / Spartan	David Ramsey		
Back to the Future	Biff Tannen	Thomas F. Wilson	2025 NTV edition	
Back to the Future Part II	Biff Tannen, Griff Tannen, Gertrude Tannen	Thomas F. Wilson	2025 NTV edition	
Back to the Future Part III	Biff Tannen, Buford "Mag Dog" Tannen	Thomas F. Wilson	2025 NTV edition	
Band of Brothers	More			
Battle of the Year	Dante	Laz Alonso		
Belle	John Davinier	Sam Reid		
Blindspot	Edgar Reade	Rob Brown		
Brain Games	Anthony Anderson			
Brothers	Major Cavazos	Clifton Collins, Jr.		
The Capture	Isaac Turner	Paapa Essiedu		
Charlie Countryman	Darko	Til Schweiger		
CSI: NY	Big Al			
Dawn of the Planet of the Apes	Koba	Toby Kebbell		
War for the Planet of the Apes	Koba	Toby Kebbell		
Day of the Dead	Pvt. Steel	Gary Howard Klar	2020 Blu-ray edition	
Deadpool 2	Bedlam	Terry Crews		
Detective Pikachu	Sebastian	Omar Chaparro		
Dumb and Dumber To	Travis and Captain Lippincott	Rob Riggle		
ER	Michael Gallant	Sharif Atkins		
F1	Rico Fazio	Joseph Balderrama		
The Fast and the Furious	Edwin	Ja Rule	2005 TV Asahi edition	
The Flash	John Diggle / Spartan	David Ramsey		
Get Out	Chris Washington	Daniel Kaluuya		
Glitter	Martin			
Goal!	Taxi driver			
Gran Turismo	Jack Salter	David Harbour		
The Great Challenge	Yang			
The Guardian	Antunez	Joe Arquette		
The Haunted Office	Richard	Jordan Chan		
Home Alone 3	Recruiting Officer	Freeman Coffey	2019 NTV edition	
Houdini & Doyle	Arthur Conan Doyle	Stephen Mangan		
The Human Centipede (First Sequence)	Katsuro	Akihiro Kitamura		
The Hunger Games	Cinna	Lenny Kravitz		
The Hunger Games: Catching Fire	Cinna	Lenny Kravitz		
I Hate Suzie	Carter Vaughan	Nathaniel Martello-White		
Identity	Robert Maine	Jake Busey	2007 TV Tokyo edition	
The Idol	Tedros	Abel Tesfaye		
In the Heights	Benny	Corey Hawkins		
It Chapter Two	Mike Hanlon	Isaiah Mustafa		
Jesse Stone: Night Passage	Joe Genest	Stephen Baldwin		
John Wick: Chapter 3 – Parabellum	Zero	Mark Dacascos		
Kinky Boots	Laura	Chiwetel Ejiofor		
Land of Bad	Sgt. Abell	Luke Hemsworth		
Mandela: Long Walk to Freedom	Walter Sisulu	Tony Kgoroge		
The Midnight After	Suet	Lam Suet		
Mortal Kombat	Jax	Mehcad Brooks		
Mortal Kombat II	Jax	Mehcad Brooks		
The Musketeers	Porthos	Howard Charles		
Nope	Otis "OJ" Haywood Jr.	Daniel Kaluuya		
Oldboy	Young Joo-hwan	Woo Il-han		
Ong-Bak: Muay Thai Warrior	Sammin	Chattapong Pantana-Angkul		
The Predator	Gaylord "Nebraska" Williams	Trevante Rhodes		
Purple Noon	Freddy Miles	Billy Kearns	2016 Star Channel edition	
Rampage	Burke	Joe Manganiello		
Revolver	Avi	André Benjamin		
Skylines	Owens	Daniel Bernhardt		
The Sorcerer's Apprentice	Goto			
A Star Is Born	Drag Bar Emcee	D.J. "Shangela" Pierce		
Street Fighter	Zangief	Olivier Richters		
Texas Chainsaw 3D	Leatherface	Dan Yeager		
Top Gun: Maverick	Bernie "Hondo" Coleman	Bashir Salahuddin		
Transformers: Rise of the Beasts	Battletrap	David Sobolov		
The Twilight Zone	Host	Jordan Peele		
Vampire Academy	Victor Dashkov	J. August Richards		
Vengeance	Fay Lok	Lam Suet		
Watchmen	Cal Abar / Jon Osterman / Doctor Manhattan	Yahya Abdul-Mateen II		
Year One	Zed	Jack Black		

=== Animation Japanese dubbing ===
Title	Role	Notes	Source
Astro Boy	Robotski		
Ferdinand	Valiente		
The Grim Adventures of Billy & Mandy	Grim		
Happy Feet Two	Wayne		
Hotel Transylvania	Foreman		
Monsters, Inc.	Rookie trainee		
Monsters University	Brock Pearson		
Sing	Boss Bear		
Sing 2	Big Daddy		
Spider-Man: Into the Spider-Verse	Scorpion		
The Super Mario Bros. Movie	Bowser (Koopa)		
The Super Mario Galaxy Movie	Bowser (Koopa)		
Thomas and Friends	Gordon, Flying Scotsman, Merlin, Kwaku, Reg, Fergus Duncan	Succeeding Gordon from Kenji Utsumi	
The Tibetan Dog	Rod		
Tom & Jerry	Spike		
Toy Story 5	Combat Carl		
Toy Story of Terror!	Combat Carl, Combat Carl Jr.		
Up	Omega		
Wander Over Yonder	Lord Hater		
What If...?	Thor		
Winnie the Pooh	Backson		
Zootopia	Chief Bogo		
Zootopia 2	Chief Bogo		
