= PopCap Arcade =

- Cover art for Vol. 1
- Developer(s): PopCap Games
- Publisher(s): PopCap Games, Mastertronic (EU)
- Platform(s): Xbox 360
- Release: NA: November 15, 2007; (Arcade Vol. 1): NA: March 31, 2009; (Arcade Vol. 2): EU: February 18, 2011; (Hits Vol. 1): EU: March 11, 2011; (Hits Vol. 2)
- Genre(s): Various
- Mode(s): Single-player, Multiplayer

PopCap Arcade Vol. 1 and PopCap Arcade Vol. 2 are retail packages of four and three Xbox Live Arcade games from PopCap Games, released exclusive in North America. The disc works by inserting it into the console just like any other game. However, rather than directly launching any of the titles, it adds four items to the Xbox Live Arcade menu with a small disc icon next to each name.

On June 3, 2010, a compilation of both volumes was released exclusively in Japan, titled PopCap Arcade: Rakushisa, Ippai, Action & Puzzle 7 Pack (ポップキャップ アーケード ～楽しさ、いっぱい。アクション＆パズル7パック～).

In 2011, PopCap Hits! Vol. 1 and PopCap Hits! Vol. 2 (not to be confused with the PlayStation 2 compilations with the same names) were published by Mastertronic exclusively in European regions. Compared to PopCap Arcade, Peggle replaces Zuma in the first volume; as a result, Zuma is on the second volume instead of the first, and Peggle is not on the second volume. The second volume also includes Plants vs. Zombies, which is not on either of the PopCap Arcade collections.

== Games ==
=== Arcade Vol. 1 ===
Title	Developer	Live Features
AstroPop	PopCap Games/CTXM	Leaderboards
Bejeweled 2	PopCap Games/CTXM	Leaderboards
Feeding Frenzy	PopCap Games/CTXM	Leaderboards
Zuma	PopCap Games/CTXM	Leaderboards

=== Arcade Vol. 2 ===
Title	Developer	Live Features
Feeding Frenzy 2	PopCap Games	Leaderboards
Heavy Weapon	PopCap Games/CTXM	Leaderboards, Multiplayer, Cooperative Play
Peggle	PopCap Games	Leaderboards, Multiplayer, Downloadable Content

=== Hits Vol. 1 ===
Title	Developer	Live Features
AstroPop	PopCap Games/CTXM	Leaderboards
Bejeweled 2	PopCap Games/CTXM	Leaderboards
Feeding Frenzy	PopCap Games/CTXM	Leaderboards
Peggle	PopCap Games/CTXM	Leaderboards, Multiplayer, Downloadable Content

=== Hits Vol. 2 ===
Title	Developer	Live Features
Feeding Frenzy 2	PopCap Games	Leaderboards
Heavy Weapon	PopCap Games/CTXM	Leaderboards, Multiplayer, Cooperative Play
Plants vs. Zombies	PopCap Games/CTXM	Leaderboards, Multiplayer
Zuma	PopCap Games	Leaderboards

== See also ==
- Capcom Digital Collection
- Namco Museum Virtual Arcade
- Konami Classics
- Xbox Live Arcade Unplugged
