= Nitaboh =

- Japanese release poster
- Directed by: Akio Nishizawa
- Story by: Kazuo Daijo
- Produced by: Masahiro Murakami
- Cinematography: Kôjirô Hayashi; Shuichi Heishi
- Edited by: Kengo Shigemura
- Music by: Makoto Kuriya
- Production company: WAO! World
- Release date: February 21, 2004
- Running time: 100 minutes
- Country: Japan
- Language: Japanese

Nitaboh, the Shamisen Master (NITABOH 仁太坊-津軽三味線始祖外聞) is a 2004 Japanese anime about Nitabō, a shamisen player, directed by Akio Nishizawa and produced by WAO! World (ワオワールド)

== Summary ==
A work depicting the life of Nitabō, the founder of the Tsugaru Shamisen style. The story shows Nitabo encountering the shamisen and performing innovative performances with historical facts and fiction. It has been selected and recommended by many institutions and organizations such as the Ministry of Education, Culture, Sports, Science and Technology, the Eilin Youth Film Council, and the Japan PTA National Council. It also won the Grand Prix in the feature film section of SICAF2006, the largest animated film festival in Asia.

== Cast ==
- Satoshi Hino as Nitabō
- Taketeru Murata as young Nitabō
- Sayaka Hanamura as Yuki
- Yumi Furukawa as young Yuki
- Tomohiko Imai as Kikunosuke
- Taya Jun as young Tomekichi
- Masako Katsuki as Tamana
- Yôsuke Naka as Kengyo
- Rokurō Naya as Osyo
- Yasunari Tajima as Tawaraboh
- Ikuko Tani as Itako
- Yae as Okinu
- Yoshie Yamamoto as Omatsu
- Akio Ōtsuka as Santaro

== Production ==
=== Music ===
Part of the film's score was recorded in Poland and performed by the Warsaw Philharmonic Orchestra.

=== Animation ===
Certain parts of the film were animated at a much higher frame rate than usual for an animated film due to the subtle movements of the shamisen player and the calligraphy in the film. Hiromitsu Agatsuma's performance of the music scenes were filmed and matched exactly for Nitabō's performance.

== Release ==
=== Box Office ===
The film was released in Japan on Feb. 21, 2004, and was presented during various international film festivals.

== Reception ==
Nitabo won the Public Award for Best Animated Film at the 11th Lyon Asian Film Festival and Best Picture Youth Jury Award, chosen by the youth jury from 9 to 12 years old. Justin Sevakis at Anime News Network praised the film as a "compelling, educating and unique piece of animation, with decent storytelling and ambition to match that of its subject" but criticized its reliance on well-worn tropes
