= Ikuko Tani =

Japanese actress & voice actress (born 1939)

- 谷 育子
- Born: April 9, 1939 (age 87); Tokyo Prefecture, Japan
- Occupations: Actress; voice actress; narrator
- Years active: 1960–present
- Agent: Mausu Promotion
- Notable work: Moomin (as Moominmamma)
- Height: 157 cm (5 ft 2 in)

Ikuko Tani (谷 育子, Tani Ikuko; born April 9, 1939) is a Japanese actress, voice actress and narrator from Tokyo Prefecture. She is best known for her roles in Tanoshii Moomin Ikka (as Moominmamma), SpongeBob SquarePants (as Patrick Star) and the Japanese dubs of the Harry Potter films (as Minerva McGonagall).

== Filmography ==
=== Television animation ===
- Galaxy Express 999 (1978) (Emeraldas)
- Bannertail: The Story of Gray Squirrel (1979) (Mother Cat)
- The New Adventures of Gigantor (1980) (Utako Shikishima)
- Lucy-May of the Southern Rainbow (1982) (Annie)
- Moomin (1990) (Moominmamma)
- Juuni Senshi Bakuretsu Eto Ranger (1995) (Jarei God Bagi)
- Takoyaki Mantoman (1998) (Oba-chan)
- Cowboy Bebop (1999) (Sally Yung)
- Case Closed (2000) (Beniko Suou)
- Cluster Edge (2005) (Chalce's Grandmother)
- Aria the Natural (2006) (Grandmother)
- Ghost Hound (2007) (Himeko Ōgami)
- Naruto Shippuden (2007) (Chiyo)
- The Beast Player Erin (2009) (Queen Shin)
- Stitch! ~The Mischievous Alien's Great Adventure~ (2009) (Grand Councilwoman)
- Stitch! ~Best Friends Forever~ (2010) (Grand Councilwoman)
- Yu-Gi-Oh! Zexal (2011) (Haru Tsukumo)
- Hunter × Hunter (Second Series) (2014) (Tsubone)
- Psycho-Pass 2 (2014) (Aoi Tsunemori)
- Beautiful Bones: Sakurako's Investigation (2015) (Asa Kōgami)
- Death Parade (2015) (Sachiko Uemura)
- Overlord (2015) (Lizzie Bareare)
- The Great Passage (2016) (Take)
- Little Witch Academia (2017) (Principal Holbrooke)
- Ace Attorney (2018) (Mara Mytonbred)
- Demon Slayer: Kimetsu no Yaiba (2019) (Hisa)
- "Deji" Meets Girl (2021) (Teruko Higa)
- Mieruko-chan (2021) (Godmother)

=== Animated films ===
- Like the Clouds, Like the Wind (1990) (Empress Kin)
- Comet in Moominland (1992) (Moominmamma)
- Boku no Son Goku (2003) (Xi Wangmu)
- Nitaboh (2004) (Itako)
- A Letter to Momo (2011) (Sae Sadahama)
- After School Midnighters (2012) (Dunkelheit, Lumière)
- A Silent Voice (2016) (Ito Nishimiya)

=== Video games ===
- Zack and Wiki: Quest for Barbaros' Treasure (2007) (Hint God)
- Higurashi no Naku koro ni Kizuna (2008-2009) (Kimiyoshi Aki)
- Kingdom Hearts Birth by Sleep (2010) (Grand Councilwoman)
- Pandora's Tower (2011) (Graiai)

=== Dubbing roles ===
==== Live-action ====
- Maggie Smith
  - The Secret Garden (Mrs. Medlock)
  - Curtain Call (Lily Marlowe)
  - Tea with Mussolini (Lady Hester Random)
  - Harry Potter and the Philosopher's Stone (Minerva McGonagall)
  - Harry Potter and the Chamber of Secrets (Minerva McGonagall)
  - Harry Potter and the Prisoner of Azkaban (Minerva McGonagall)
  - Harry Potter and the Goblet of Fire (Minerva McGonagall)
  - Becoming Jane (Lady Gresham)
  - Harry Potter and the Order of the Phoenix (Minerva McGonagall)
  - Harry Potter and the Half-Blood Prince (Minerva McGonagall)
  - Nanny McPhee and the Big Bang (Agatha "Aggie" Docherty)
  - Harry Potter and the Deathly Hallows – Part 2 (Minerva McGonagall)
  - The Lady in the Van (Miss Mary Shepherd)
- Judi Dench
  - Tomorrow Never Dies (2001 Fuji TV edition) (M)
  - The Shipping News (Agnis Hamm)
  - Ladies in Lavender (Ursula Widdington)
  - Mrs Henderson Presents (Laura Henderson)
  - Quantum of Solace (2016 BS Japan edition) (M)
  - J. Edgar (Anna Marie Hoover)
  - Jane Eyre (Mrs Fairfax)
  - Skyfall (M)
  - Spectre (Mallory's predecessor as M)
  - Miss Peregrine's Home for Peculiar Children (Miss Esmeralda Avocet)
  - Victoria & Abdul (Queen Victoria)
  - All Is True (Anne Hathaway)
  - Artemis Fowl (Commander Julius Root)
  - Belfast (Granny)
- Rosemary Harris
  - Sunshine (Valerie Sors)
  - The Gift (Annie's grandmother)
  - Spider-Man (May Parker)
  - Being Julia (Julia's Mother)
  - Spider-Man 2 (May Parker)
  - Before the Devil Knows You're Dead (Nanette Hanson)
  - Spider-Man 3 (May Parker)
- Kathy Bates
  - Used People (Bibby Berman)
  - Dolores Claiborne (Dolores Claiborne)
  - The War at Home (Maurine Collier)
  - Titanic (Margaret "Molly" Brown)
- The Addams Family (Abigail Craven (Elizabeth Wilson))
- Born on the Fourth of July (VHS edition) (Mrs. Kovic (Caroline Kava))
- Brothers & Sisters (Nora Walker (Sally Field))
- Burn Notice (Madeline Westen (Sharon Gless))
- Cat People (1992 TV Asahi edition) (Female (Ruby Dee))
- Crouching Tiger, Hidden Dragon (Jade Fox (Cheng Pei-pei))
- Cube (Dr. Helen Holloway (Nicky Guadagni))
- Dead Again (Inga (Hanna Schygulla))
- Dragonheart (Queen Aislinn (Julie Christie))
- Dynasty (Alexis Carrington Colby (Joan Collins))
- ER (Nurse Lydia Wright (Ellen Crawford))
- Family Business (Margie (Janet Carroll))
- Friends (Frances (Audra Lindley))
- Halloween II (1988 NTV edition) (Marion Chambers (Nancy Stephens))
- Hannah Montana: The Movie (Grandma Ruby (Margo Martindale))
- Hocus Pocus (Winifred Sanderson (Bette Midler))
- Hope Floats (Ramona Calvert (Gena Rowlands))
- Joy (Mimi (Diane Ladd))
- The Last Word (Harriett Lauler (Shirley MacLaine))
- Lemony Snicket's A Series of Unfortunate Events (Aunt Josephine (Meryl Streep))
- Miami Rhapsody (Nina Marcus (Mia Farrow))
- Nebraska (Kate Grant (June Squibb))
- Nomadland (Linda (Linda May))
- The Others (Bertha Mills (Fionnula Flanagan))
- Parenthood (Helen Buckman (Dianne Wiest))
- Playing by Heart (Mildred (Ellen Burstyn))
- Practical Magic (Aunt Frances Owens (Stockard Channing))
- The Princess Diaries (Queen Clarisse Renaldi (Julie Andrews))
- The Princess Diaries 2: Royal Engagement (Queen Clarisse Renaldi (Julie Andrews))
- Rear Window (2012 Blu-Ray edition) (Stella (Thelma Ritter))
- Red Sparrow (Matron (Charlotte Rampling))
- Roman Holiday (2004 Nippon TV edition) (Countess Vereberg (Margaret Rawlings))
- The Rookie (Olline (Beth Grant))
- The Royal Tenenbaums (Etheline Tenenbaum (Anjelica Huston))
- Rumor Has It (Katharine Richelieu (Shirley MacLaine))
- The Secret Life of Walter Mitty (2019 THE CINEMA edition) (Edna Mitty (Shirley MacLaine))
- Sherlock (Mrs. Hudson (Una Stubbs))
- Simon Birch (Grandmother Wenteworth (Dana Ivey))
- Spider-Man: No Way Home (Ned's grandmother (Mary Rivera))
- Star Trek: The Next Generation (Katherine Pulaski (Diana Muldaur))
- Suspiria (1986 TV Tokyo edition) (Miss Tanner (Alida Valli))
- Veronica Guerin (Bernie Guerin (Brenda Fricker))
- The Young Pope (Sister Mary (Diane Keaton))

==== Animation ====
- The Exploits of Moominpappa: Adventures of a Young Moomin (Moominmamma)
- Moomins on the Riviera (Moominmamma)
