= Takoyaki Mantoman =

Japanese anime television series

たこやきマントマン
- Picture book series
- Released from July 1990 to June 1999
- Anime television series
- Directed by: Masami Anno; Akira Shigino (series director)
- Produced by: Kyoko Kobayashi; Naoyuki Oshikiri; Kyotaro Kimura
- Written by: Yoshio Urasawa
- Music by: Kazunori Maruyama
- Studio: Studio Pierrot
- Original network: TV Tokyo
- Original run: April 4, 1998 – September 25, 1999
- Episodes: 77

Takoyaki Mantoman (たこやきマントマン) is a Japanese anime television series. It is about a group of caped, crime-fighting takoyaki men. It was produced by Studio Pierrot and broadcast for 77 episodes on TV Tokyo from April 1998 to September 1999. The anime was based on a series of children's picture books published in the 1990s.

== Characters ==
=== Takoyaki Mantomen ===
Red (レッド)
Voiced by: Satsuki Yukino
Blue (ブルー)
Voiced by: Kappei Yamaguchi
Green (グリーン)
Voiced by: Wasabi Mizuta
Yellow (イエロー)
Voiced by: Mikawa Tsutomu
Pink (ピンク)
Voiced by: Megumi Nasu

=== Supporting ===
Oba-chan (おばちゃん)
Voiced by: Ikuko Tani

=== Antagonists ===
Mr. Bao Bao (バオバオ和尚)
Voiced by: Kiyoshi Kobayashi
Tenten (バオバオ和尚)
Voiced by: Kurumi Mamiya
