= Otomedius Excellent =

2011 video game

- Developer: Konami
- Publisher: Konami
- Directors: Toshiyasu Kamiko; Kimihiro Taniyama
- Producer: Koji Igarashi
- Artist: Mine Yoshizaki
- Writer: Kazuhiko Maeda
- Composers: Nobuhiko Matsufuji; Atsushi Sato; Naoyuki Sato; Norihiko Hibino
- Series: Otomedius; Gradius
- Platform: Xbox 360
- Release: JP: April 21, 2011; NA: November 1, 2011
- Genre: Scrolling shooter
- Modes: Single-player, multiplayer

Otomedius Excellent (オトメディウスX（エクセレント, Otomediusu X (Ekuserento!)) is a scrolling shooter video game, developed and published by Konami for the Xbox 360 video game console. It is the sequel to the 2008 game Otomedius G (Gorgeous!), a spin-off of the Gradius series. It was released in 2011 on April 21 in Japan and in North America on November 1.

Otomedius Excellent features female characters from different Konami franchises.

== Gameplay ==
Otomedius Excellent offers a single-player campaign and a multi-player mode provided via the Xbox Live service. If stages are too hard, the player can recruit up to three helpers in the Multiplay offline mode. In Score Attack new weapon cards can be unlocked after finishing the main game. Through Xbox Live online multiplayer was possible and new content could be unlocked. There are also several new characters, several extra stages and several character BGM packs that were available through downloadable content.

=== Plot ===
The game is set in the year 2011 AD, after a global war between the Angel Squadrons and the Gofer Sisters, as played out in Otomedius Gorgeous. The Inter-Dimensional Organization G has created a new Bacterian Army now led by the mysterious Dark Force. With their new army Organization G attacks both Earth and Gradius, forcing the new members of Angel Squadron to go back in time and fight before Dark Force becomes too powerful to beat.

== Release ==
In July 2011, the first packages of downloadable content (DLC) were released. They featured BGM packs, extra stages and customize Outfits through Xbox Live.

The soundtrack album contains the game's musical tracks from a variety of popular game composers including GEM Impact (Norihiko Hibino and Takahiro Izutani), Motoi Sakuraba, Michiru Yamane, and Shinji Hosoe. The soundtrack also features a large amount of arrangements from previous Konami games. It was released on March 29, 2012, in Japan by Konami, with cover art by Mine Yoshizaki.

== Reception ==
Reception

Aggregate score
Aggregator	Score
Metacritic	48%

Review scores
Publication	Score
1Up.com	C+
Destructoid	3/10
Game Informer	3.75/10
GameRevolution	6/10
IGN	5.5/10
Official Xbox Magazine (US)	5/10
GameCritics.com	2/10

The review aggregate website, Metacritic, displayed a score of 48/100, which indicates "generally unfavorable reviews". Eric Bowman of GameCritics.com gave the game a 2/10, saying "Otomedius Excellent shouldn't be worth anyone's time. Beyond the overall badness of the gameplay, the whole thing just feels incredibly cynical." Daemon Hatfield of IGN called it "outdated and overpriced," giving the game a 5.5/10.

The difficulty was particularly criticized. Cameron Lewis of Official Xbox Magazine gave it a 5/10, stating "It's frustrating, it makes no sense, and it just makes everyone involved want to play something else." Kevin Schaller of Game Revolution also noted the difficulty, saying "If you think games like Mega Man 9 and 10 are tough, you have no idea just how dead you can be in a game."
