= Konami Classics =

- Konami Classics Vol. 1 Cover art
- Developer: Konami
- Publisher: Konami
- Platform: Xbox 360
- Release: NA: December 15, 2009
- Genre: Various
- Modes: Single-player, multiplayer

Konami Classics Vol. 1 and Konami Classics Vol. 2 are retail packages of three Xbox Live Arcade games developed and published by Konami. The disc works by inserting it into the console just like any other game. However, rather than directly launching any of the titles, it adds three items to the Xbox Live Arcade menu with a small disc icon next to each name.

== Games ==
All games included in the compilation feature online leaderboards and achievements; online multiplayer is also supported for all games with multiplayer functionality.

=== Vol. 1 ===
- Castlevania: Symphony of the Night (1997)
- Frogger (1981)
- Super Contra (1987)

=== Vol. 2 ===
- Contra (1987)
- Rush'n Attack (1985)
- Track & Field (1983)

== See also ==
- Konami 80's Arcade Gallery - also titled Konami Arcade Classics and Konami 80's AC Special.
- Konami Antiques MSX Collection
- Konami Classics Series: Arcade Hits - also titled Konami Arcade Classics in Europe.
- Konami Collector's Series: Arcade Advanced
- List of Konami games
- Capcom Digital Collection
- Namco Museum Virtual Arcade
- PopCap Arcade
- Xbox Live Arcade Unplugged
