= Capcom Digital Collection =

2012 video game

- North American box art
- Developer(s): Capcom
- Publisher(s): Capcom
- Platform(s): Xbox 360
- Release: NA: March 27, 2012; EU: March 30, 2012
- Genre(s): Various
- Mode(s): Single-player, multiplayer

Capcom Digital Collection is a compilation of Xbox Live Arcade games released by Capcom for the Xbox 360. The game was released on March 27, 2012, in North America and March 30, 2012, in Europe.

The collection has eight games previously available via Xbox Live Arcade for Xbox 360:

- 1942: Joint Strike (2008)
- Bionic Commando Rearmed 2 (2011)
- Final Fight: Double Impact (2010)
- Flock! (2009)
- Rocketmen: Axis of Evil (including It Came From Uranus DLC) [2008]
- Super Puzzle Fighter II Turbo HD Remix (2007)
- Super Street Fighter II Turbo HD Remix (2008)
- Wolf of the Battlefield: Commando 3 (2008)

== See also ==
- Namco Museum Virtual Arcade
- Konami Classics
- PopCap Arcade
- Xbox Live Arcade Unplugged
