= Ninja Blade =

2009 video game

- PAL territories Xbox 360 cover
- Developer: FromSoftware (Note: Development support by Microsoft Game Studios Japan. Windows port developed by ND Games.)
- Publishers: Microsoft Game Studios: Xbox 360; Microsoft Game Studios; JP: FromSoftware; Windows; WW: Noviy Disk (Note: Released under the ND Games publishing label.); EU: Iceberg Interactive
- Director: Keiichiro Ogawa
- Producer: Masanori Takeuchi
- Designer: Kazuhiro Hamatani
- Programmer: Takeshi Suzuki
- Artists: Masato Miyazaki; Takaaki Yamagishi; Jun Miyauchi
- Writers: Masanori Takeuchi; Kazuhiro Hamatani
- Composers: Norihiko Hibino; Yoshitaka Suzuki; Takahiro Izutani; Takahide Ayuzawa
- Platforms: Xbox 360; Windows
- Release: Xbox 360: JP: January 29, 2009; EU: April 3, 2009; NA: April 7, 2009; AU: August 6, 2009; Windows: RU: November 5, 2009; WW: November 19, 2009; EU: February 19, 2010
- Genre: Action
- Mode: Single-player

Ninja Blade (Note: Japanese: ニンジャブレイド, Hepburn: Ninja Bureido) is a 2009 action game developed by FromSoftware and published by Microsoft Game Studios for Xbox 360 and Windows.

== Gameplay ==
The player plays as a modern-day ninja, using a katana, twin swords and broad sword as the main weapon to the hostile creatures. Ninja Blade takes up a combat system similar to Ninja Gaiden or Devil May Cry. A chi bar is used up when "ninja vision" or ninjutsu is used. The gameplay is highly cinematic, relying on quick time events to finish missions; after attacking a boss until the health bar is empty, the player must perform a finishing move called the "todome".

== Plot ==
In 2011, a group of oversized rats attack a small Northern African village, infecting its inhabitants with an unknown hookworm parasite, classified as "Alpha-worm", which alters its hosts' bodies and minds while increasing their strength and resilience. To prevent an outbreak, the military raid the quarantine zone and exterminate the infected, while the incident is covered up by the government. Military intelligence forms a containment task force called GUIDE (Global United Infestation Detection and Elimination), recruiting operatives from around the world.

Four years later, a GUIDE ninja team, including the young Ken Ogawa and led by his father Kanbe, is dispatched to Tokyo to contain a massive Alpha-worm outbreak, which the JSDF have failed to contain. Following Kanbe's trail, Ken chases and defeats an Arachne creature, however Kanbe and teammate Kuroh, having been infected by King Worms, slaughter the entire unit. Kanbe runs Ken through with the clan's 'Ninja Blade', narrowly missing his heart—something a master swordsman could only do on purpose. After a quick recovery, Ken is dispatched solo back to the city.

As Ken eliminates other major Alpha-worm Carriers, he is informed that the military are considering a mass sterilization of Tokyo via orbital laser cannon, which will sacrifice its entire population. He then pursues two more King Worm hosts, a father-daughter pair of Yakuza bosses, oyabun Tojiro and Ryoko Kurokawa. After defeating both, Ken witnesses Ryoko momentarily regain her sanity and beg for a mercy killing, which re-ignites hope in Ken that he may still save his father.

After thwarting an attempt to spread the infection overseas through a plane carrying evacuees, Ken learns that Kuroh has attacked the local shopping mall and rigged the Tokyo underground with explosive Carriers called Blast Mites. Ken disposes of the Mites, catapulting the last one into the air out of harm's way. The bombing, however, was meant as a distraction to allow Kuroh to lead a strike team of Carrier military operatives into the GUIDE headquarters. All GUIDE personnel, including director Michael Wilson, are taken hostage. With remote help from Wilson himself, Ken manages to rescue the hostages, after having to kill his former teammates turned Carriers. In a final confrontation with Ken, Kuroh reveals that Ken was not born but made in a military lab with the goal of wiping out the Alpha-worms, hence his immunity to the parasite. Kuroh also reveals that both he and Kanbe infected themselves with King Worms intentionally, Kuroh having done so out of craving for the power bestowed by the parasite.

Kanbe rescues Ken from a suicide attack by Kuroh, whereupon he confirms he volunteered to be infected, but only so that he could infiltrate and locate the Alpha-worm hive, which was buried underground to escape sterilization. Ken goes underground and eventually finds the hive, however he is unable to use the Ninja Blade to destroy it. A now fully possessed Kanbe challenges Ken on top of the Tokyo Tower. Before Ken can finish him, the hive absorbs Kanbe, thus transforming into a colossal version of him which begins laying waste to the city. Ken chases down and attacks the mutant Kanbe, weakening him enough for Ken to enter the hive and attack its core, which manifests itself in Kanbe's shape again. Ken defeats the core using the Ninja Blade and finally brings peace to his father, then the hive crumbles along with every trace of the infection.

Months later, Tokyo is being rebuilt after the whole incident is again covered up by the government and media. Wilson reforms GUIDE and appoints Ken to train and lead the new recruits in the event of a new outbreak.

== Development and release ==
The concept for Ninja Blade initially came when FromSoftware tried to create a game that conveyed the same intense sequences as those of Hollywood action films. FromSoftware worked with Microsoft Game Studios Japan in creating the game's protagonist, Ken Ogawa. Producer Masanori Takeuchi said: "We worked closely with Microsoft in creating Ken. They provided us with lots of useful feedback and insightful consumer research of worldwide gamers. By cooperating and working together, Ken has become more appealing to a wider audience." The character was designed by Capcom 2nd Character Development Studio designer Keiji Nakaoka.

The game has been categorized as a "cinematic action game," combining a mixture of hack and slash elements with context-sensitive commands. Ninja Blade was commonly referred to as Otogi 3 by various sources before its official announcement. Lead planner Kazuhiro Hamatani noted that while not a direct sequel or spiritual successor to Otogi, the game would contain action-adventure elements of which fans of the Otogi series would like. The soundtrack was composed by Norihiko Hibino's GEM Impact studio. The animation was produced by Production I.G.

A demo was released in Japan on December 29, 2008. The demo was released in North America on March 10, 2009. The full game was released for Xbox 360 in 2009 in Japan on January 29, Europe on April 3, North America on April 7, and Australia on August 6. A port for Windows was released by Russian publisher ND Games both physically and on their digital storefront in Russia on November 5, 2009. It was made available worldwide via Steam two weeks later on November 19, 2009. This is no longer the case as of April 1st, 2022. Having signed a mutual publishing agreement with Noviy Disk, Iceberg Interactive released a retail version of the game in select regions in Europe on February 19, 2010. The game was also made available through cloud service OnLive in North America as part of a bundle on February 1, 2011, and in the United Kingdom alongside the regional launch of the service on September 22, 2011.

== Reception ==
Reception

Aggregate score
| Aggregator | Score |
|---|---|
| Metacritic | X360: 68/100; PC: 61/100 |

Review scores
| Publication | Score |
|---|---|
| 1Up.com | C− |
| Eurogamer | 7/10 |
| Famitsu | 32/40 |
| GamePro | 5/5 |
| GameSpot | 7.5/10 |
| GameTrailers | 5.9/10 |
| GameZone | 6/10 |
| IGN | 6.5/10 |
| X-Play | 4/5 |

Overall, the game has received mixed to positive reviews. Ninja Blade was named Game of the Month in the June 2009 issue of GamePro, with a rating of 5/5 stars. In GameSpot's The Best of 2009 awards, it was one of the five titles nominated for Best Game No One Played.
