= Takahiro Izutani =

Japanese video game music composer and guitarist

Takahiro Izutani 泉谷 隆洋
- Born: October 7 Yokohama, Japan
- Genres: Video game music
- Occupation: Composer
- Instrument: guitar
- Years active: 1997- present
- Label: Brave Wave Productions

Takahiro Izutani (イズタニ タカヒロ, Izutani Takahiro; born October 7 in Yokohama, Japan) is a video game music composer and guitarist. He is notable for his work in the Metal Gear Solid series.

== Profile ==
In 1997, his avant-garde rock band Happy Family (Japanese band) released an album, "Toscco" on Cuneiform Records in the U.S. (http://cuneiformrecords.com/bandshtml/happyfamily.html) "Happy Family" collaborated with many underground artists in Japan, New York and Europe. Afterwards Izutani began to work for major Japanese labels. He remixed (occasionally as Brent Mini) and produced the songs of many pop artists (Ayumi Hamasaki is the most famous one). In 2006, he started his personal band "DUGO", and the track "Dublin" was used in an episode in Season 3 of CSI: Miami. Dugo released the first album "Lingua Franca" from Brave Wave Productions in 2017.

== Works ==
=== Video games ===
- Metal Gear Solid: Portable Ops (2006)
- Yakuza 2 (2006)
- Wolf of the Battlefield: Commando 3 (2007)
- Metal Gear Solid 4: Guns of the Patriots (2008)
- Ninja Blade (2009)
- Otomedius G (2009)
- Bayonetta (2009)
- Metal Gear Solid: Peace Walker (2010)
- The Eye of Judgment: Legends (2010)
- Otomedius Excellent (2011)
- Ace Combat: Assault Horizon (2011)
- Shinobi 3D (2011)
- Bayonetta 2 (2014)
- Bayonetta 3 (2022)
- Resident Evil 4 (2023 video game) Separate Ways DLC (2023)
- Death Stranding 2: On the Beach (2025)

=== Anime ===
- Blassreiter (2008)
