= "Deji" Meets Girl =

Japanese animated television series

- Key visual

でーじミーツガール (Dēji Mītsu Gāru)
- Genre: Fantasy
- Manga
- Written by: Akane Malbeni
- Published by: Flex Comix
- Magazine: Comic Polaris
- Original run: September 30, 2021 – 2022
- Volumes: 1
- Anime television series
- Directed by: Ushio Tazawa
- Written by: Akane Malbeni
- Music by: Hiroshi Nakamura
- Studio: Liden Films
- Licensed by: BI: Anime Limited; NA: GKIDS
- Original network: MBS, TBS
- Original run: October 2, 2021 – December 18, 2021
- Episodes: 12

"Deji" Meets Girl (Japanese: でーじミーツガール, Hepburn: Dēji Mītsu Gāru) is a Japanese original short anime television series produced by Liden Films. It aired from October to December 2021 on the Super Animeism programming block.

== Characters ==
Maise Higa (比嘉舞星, Higa Maise)
Voiced by: Kiyono Yasuno
A first-year high school student in Okinawa. She was originally in the handball club but quit after an injury. During summer vacation she works part-time at the front desk of her father's Hotel Higa.
Ichirō Suzuki (すずきいちろう, Suzuki Ichirō)
Voiced by: Tatsuyuki Kobayashi
A young tourist from Tokyo staying at Hotel Higa.
Kaisei Higa (比嘉海星, Higa Kaisei)
Voiced by: Kenta Miyake
Maise's father and the owner of Hotel Higa.
Teruko Higa (比嘉テル子, Higa Teruko)
Voiced by: Ikuko Tani
Maise's grandmother who works as a psychic under the name "Yuta".

== Media ==
=== Manga ===
A manga adaptation, also written and illustrated by Akane Malbeni, was serialized in Flex Comix's Comic Polaris website from September 30, 2021 to 2022. The series was collected into a single tankōbon volume, published by Flex Comix on May 13, 2022.

==== Volume list ====
No.	Japanese release date	Japanese ISBN
1	May 13, 2022	978-4-86675-201-3

=== Anime ===
The original story is credited to Naminoue Seinendan and produced by Japanese studio Liden Films, with direction and character design by Ushio Tazawa and series composition and original character design by Akane Malbeni; Kaori Akatsu and Norifumi Okuno designed the props, with music by Hiroshi Nakamura, sound direction by Ryousuke Naya, sound work credited to Studio Mouse, editing by Satomi Yamada, backgrounds supervised by Miu Miyamoto, colour design by Kunio Tsujita, compositing supervised by Mitsuyoshi Yamamoto and CG directed by Yoshimasa Yamazaki. The series aired from October 2 to December 18, 2021, on the Super Animeism block on MBS, TBS and other channels. (Note: MBS and TBS list the series premiere at 25:50 on October 1, 2021, which is effectively 1:50 a.m. JST on October 2.) Aoi Kubo performed the series's theme song "Otogibanashi no Yо̄ na Kiseki".

The series had its international premiere on August 25, 2021, at the 25th Fantasia International Film Festival in Montreal as a closing-day screening.

In North America, GKIDS will screen the series in theaters in 2022.

==== Episode list ====
No.	Title	Original release date
1	"Is This Normal in Okinawa?"; Transliteration: "Korette Okinawa ja Futsū?" (Japanese: これって沖縄じゃ普通？)	October 2, 2021
2	"It's... Not... a Dream"; Transliteration: "Yume ja... Nai..." (Japanese: 夢じゃ...ない...)	October 9, 2021
3	"Is It Your Doing Again?"; Transliteration: "Mata Anta no Sei?" (Japanese: またあんたのせい？)	October 16, 2021 (Note: This episode aired at 2:05 a.m. JST, 15 minutes after the original air time.)
4	"But Okinawa is Amazing"; Transliteration: "Shikashi Sugē na Okinawa" (Japanese: しかしすげーな沖縄)	October 23, 2021
5	"Bloody Fool"; Transliteration: "Shini Furā" (Japanese: しにフラー)	October 30, 2021
6	"I'm Glad As It Is"; Transliteration: "Sono Mama de Yokatta no ni" (Japanese: そのままでよかったのに)	November 6, 2021
7	"That Kid is a Little Difficult"; Transliteration: "Ano Ko wa Chotto Nangi da ne" (Japanese: あの子はちょっと難儀だね)	November 13, 2021
8	"Summer Vacation is Already Over"; Transliteration: "Natsuyasumi wa Mō Owari" (Japanese: 夏休みはもう終わり)	November 20, 2021
9	"I'll Be Busy Today"; Transliteration: "Kyō wa Isogashiku Naru sā" (Japanese: 今日は忙しくなるさー)	November 27, 2021
10	"Let's Hide and Seek Until Morning"; Transliteration: "Asa Made Kakurenbo Shiyō" (Japanese: 朝までかくれんぼしよう)	December 4, 2021
11	"You're, Terribly Amazing"; Transliteration: "Anta, Dēji Sugoi" (Japanese: あんた、でーじすごい)	December 11, 2021
12	"Deji Meets Girl"; Transliteration: "Dēji Mītsu Gāru" (Japanese: でーじミーツガール)	December 18, 2021

== Release ==
The animated series has been licensed for North America by GKIDS and for the United Kingdom and Ireland by Anime Limited. It was released in cinemas in North America as part of event screenings of the unrelated feature film Fortune Favours Lady Nikuko and in the United Kingdom and Ireland the same way on August 10, 2022.
