= 1942: Joint Strike =

2008 video game

- Xbox Live Arcade box art
- Developer: Backbone Entertainment
- Publisher: Capcom
- Composer: Norihiko Hibino
- Series: 194X
- Platforms: Xbox 360, PlayStation 3
- Release: Xbox 360: WW: July 23, 2008; PlayStation 3: NA: July 24, 2008; PAL: September 11, 2008
- Genre: Vertically scrolling shooter
- Modes: Single-player, multiplayer

1942: Joint Strike is a 2008 vertically scrolling shooter video game developed by Backbone Entertainment and published by Capcom for the Xbox 360 and PlayStation 3. It was released on Xbox Live Arcade and PlayStation Network. It is a remake of Capcom's 1984 video game 1942. 1942: Joint Strike is included in Capcom Digital Collection.

== Gameplay ==
The game is an amalgamation of various elements of the 19XX series. It includes health meter and bomb system from 1943: The Battle of Midway; charge-fire, land-based battle sections and rank increases from 1941: Counter Attack; and fighter lineup, bomb-based end-level bonus and level rank system from 19XX: The War Against Destiny.

== Reception ==
Reception

Aggregate score
Aggregator	Score	
Aggregator	PS3	Xbox 360
Metacritic	69/100	68/100

Review scores
Publication	Score	
Publication	PS3	Xbox 360
1Up.com	B+	B+
Edge	4/10	4/10
Eurogamer	N/A	7/10
GameDaily	7/10	7/10
GamePro	3/5	3/5
GameRevolution	N/A	B−
GameSpot	6.5/10	6.5/10
Giant Bomb	3/5	3/5
IGN	7/10	7/10
PlayStation Official Magazine – UK	6/10	N/A
Official Xbox Magazine (US)	N/A	6/10
411Mania	N/A	7.5/10
Wired	6/10	6/10

The game received "average" reviews on both platforms according to the review aggregation website Metacritic. IGN commented on the short length of the game, "spotty" online play and poor value for money, but praised the graphical overhaul. Anthony Gallegos of 1Up.com stated that while the game was short, this added to its 'arcade' appeal.

Since its release, the Xbox 360 version sold 111,195 units worldwide by January 2011. Sales moved up to 119,376 units by the end of 2011.
