= Wolf of the Battlefield: Commando 3 =

2008 video game

- Developer: Backbone Entertainment
- Publisher: Capcom
- Composers: Norihiko Hibino; Yoshitaka Suzuki; Takahiro Izutani
- Platforms: PlayStation 3, Xbox 360
- Release: PlayStation 3 (PSN): NA: June 5, 2008; PAL: July 3, 2008; Xbox 360 (XBLA); June 25, 2008
- Genre: Run and gun
- Modes: Single-player, multiplayer

Wolf of the Battlefield: Commando 3 is a 2008 run and gun video game developed by Backbone Entertainment and published by Capcom for the PlayStation 3 and Xbox 360. It is the second sequel to Capcom's Commando arcade game, following Mercs; "Wolf of the Battlefield" is a translation of the series' original title (Senjō no Ōkami).

Wolf of the Battlefield: Commando 3 is included in Capcom Digital Collection.

== Gameplay ==
Wolf of the Battlefield: Commando 3 is an arcade-style run and gun video game reminiscent of its predecessors but in a 3D perspective. The basic gameplay loop involves moving and dodging oncoming fire while strengthening one's own character with power-ups and new weapons, such as grenades or rocket launchers. There are rideable vehicles which can be operated by multiple players.

The game can be played with anywhere from one to three players: the playable characters being Wolf, Coyote, and Fox. One may play locally or in an online campaign.

Wolf of the Battlefield: Commando 3 gameplay screenshot.

== Reception ==
Reception

Aggregate score
Aggregator	Score	
Aggregator	PS3	Xbox 360
Metacritic	66/100	66/100

Review scores
Publication	Score	
Publication	PS3	Xbox 360
Edge	N/A	6/10
Eurogamer	7/10	N/A
GamePro	3/5	N/A
GameRevolution	N/A	C−
GameSpot	6.5/10	6.5/10
GameZone	N/A	7/10
Giant Bomb	2/5	2/5
IGN	6.2/10	5.9/10
PlayStation Official Magazine – UK	6/10	N/A
Official Xbox Magazine (US)	N/A	8.5/10
411Mania	N/A	7.2/10

The game received "average" reviews on both platforms according to the review aggregation website Metacritic. TeamXbox said, "Commando 3 definitely has its appeal, but a lot more could have been done to extend the gameplay or just make it feel more varied." Official Xbox Magazine said, "This three-player scrolling shooter has that old-school, spray-and-slay mojo that your inner rageaholic craves."
