= Elvandia Story =

2007 video game

- Developer(s): Spike
- Publisher(s): Spike
- Composer(s): Norihiko Hibino; Noriyuki Iwadare
- Platform(s): PlayStation 2
- Release: JP: April 26, 2007
- Genre(s): Tactical role-playing
- Mode(s): Single-player

Elvandia Story (エルヴァンディア ストーリー, Erubandia Sutōrī) is a tactical role-playing game for the PlayStation 2. It was developed by Spike and released in Japan on April 26, 2007. The game features high resolution 2D sprites. The game's battle format has been compared to Fire Emblem, in which the camera switches perspective to a 3/4 overhead view of one-on-one combat. The music is composed by Norihiko Hibino. The main musical theme for Elvandia Story, titled "Lion no Tsubasa", was sung by Chihiro Yonekura.

== Plot ==
The story revolves around Ashley, son of a Lord from the State of Kastol, who recently returned to his home town. While he is with his friends, he receives a message that the neighbouring State of Lumen is under attack from the north by the troops of Genes. He decides to stop Genes and starts his journey to Lumen in order to end the fight and restore peace on the continent.
