= Blassreiter =

Japanese anime television series

- First DVD cover

ブラスレイター (Burasureitā)
- Genre: Action, mecha
- Created by: Gonzo; Nitroplus
- Anime television series
- Directed by: Ichirō Itano
- Produced by: Masaru Nagai; Takehiko Shimazu
- Written by: Yasuko Kobayashi (story); Gen Urobuchi (series); Ichirō Itano (series)
- Music by: Norihiko Hibino
- Studio: Gonzo
- Licensed by: Crunchyroll
- Original network: tvk, Sun TV, Chiba TV, TV Saitama, AT-X
- English network: SEA: Animax Asia; US: Crunchyroll Channel
- Original run: April 5, 2008 – September 27, 2008
- Episodes: 24
- Manga

Blassreiter: Genetic
- Written by: Noboru Kimura
- Illustrated by: Shū Hirose
- Published by: Akita Shoten
- Magazine: Champion Red
- Original run: November 2007 – April 2009
- Volumes: 3
- Light novel

Blassreiter Judgement
- Written by: Chiyo Momose
- Illustrated by: Niθ
- Published by: Kadokawa Shoten
- Imprint: Kadokawa Sneaker Bunko
- Published: July 1, 2008

Blassreiter (Japanese: ブラスレイター, Hepburn: Burasureitā) (Note: "Blassreiter" is faux-German for "pale rider".) is a Japanese anime television series co-created and produced by Gonzo and Nitro+. The title is pseudo-German and can be translated as "Pale Rider". A manga titled Blassreiter: Genetic (ブラスレイター ジェネティック, Burasureitā Jenetikku; stylized as BLASSREITER –genetic–) was serialized in Champion Red magazine.

Along with The Tower of Druaga: The Aegis of Uruk, and later Strike Witches, this series was officially broadcast with English subtitles on the video websites YouTube, Crunchyroll, and BOST TV. It has been licensed for a North American release by Funimation Entertainment, currently known as Crunchyroll.

== Story ==
The story is set in a fictional Germany and centers on the outbreak of biomechanical creatures called "Demoniacs", who rise from corpses and attack people savagely. The Demoniacs have the ability to merge with most technology including cars and motorcycles, not only gaining control of them but also enhancing their performance greatly. Against them is a group of people known as XAT, Xenogenesis Assault Team, who police these Demoniacs in an attempt to keep the peace and discover the reasons for the "Demoniac" change. All the while, a number of human-turned-Demoniacs appear. Some use their powers for good, others for evil. One will rise above all other Demoniacs to become known as the "Blassreiter".

=== Gerd arc ===
The story begins with the introduction of famous motorcycle champion, Gerd Frentzen. After an accident at the circuit, Gerd is rendered a paraplegic, until offered a cure in the way of a drug, which miraculously cures his paraplegia—by transforming him into an Amalgam. Gerd publicly exposes his Amalgam form during an XAT operation and has agents Hermann and his partner Amanda assigned to him by the organization for constant surveillance to study the nature of his metamorphosis, but concluded that the Demoniac responsible for Gerd's accident was also an Amalgam-human hybrid—explaining its ability to elude capture. With the help of his friend Hermann, Gerd escapes to visit his girlfriend Jill, only to discover she had been scheming all along with Gerd's former team manager, Matthew, in exploiting his fame—old and new. Emotionally betrayed, Gerd quickly succumbed to the influence of his recent changes and assaults Jill. Hermann and Amanda arrive, causing Gerd to flee. Pursued by Hermann and the XAT, Gerd encounters the Amalgam from the circuit accident and in the ensuing pursuit, Gerd crashes and is presumed dead. However, Gerd survived, though half of his face was left badly scarred from the crash. Branded a Demoniac by the general public, Gerd garners little moral support (only Hermann and Amanda's brother Malek) and fully succumbs to his metamorphosis, triggering intense hallucinations of Amalgams. In a pivotal encounter, Gerd finally makes peace with "Blue", the other Amalgam-human and asks to be stopped if he loses control again. Gerd is killed in front of Hermann and Malek.

=== Malek arc ===
Malek, who has been ridiculed and attacked by his school's seniors since he was adopted by Amanda, is distraught by the death of Gerd. He believed that Gerd would punish his attackers, but Gerd ended up being a "coward" by letting himself be killed. When Malek's friend Johann commits suicide after realizing his mistakes in ridiculing, he wonders why no one will stand up for justice. After being offered a pill by Beatrice, Malek transforms into an Amalgam. Malek kills the delinquents and is hunted by the XAT. Joseph, who had met Malek before, attempts to stop Malek from losing control and intervenes while Brad is shooting on the roof top a couple buildings away. Before Brad is about to shoot Malek, Joseph jumps in front to take the shot for him, causing Joseph to be severely injured. Amanda and Al fire at the wounded Joseph, but Malek shouts and Amanda recognizes his voice. Brad shoots Malek's shield and destroys it, aiming for another shot to Malek's head. Amanda realizes that the Amalgam is actually Malek, and before Brad shoots, jumps in front of Malek to block it, causing Brad to miss. Malek then flees, carrying the body of the unconscious Joseph. They hide in an abandoned church, where Malek attempts to heal Joseph. They are then found by Xargin, who Malek sees as an enemy and attacks. Joseph tries to warn Malek not to fight, but Malek does and is beaten by Xargin easily. Eventually, they are found by Amanda and Hermann. Malek falls into a coma and both are captured by XAT. At the same time, XAT is facing a critical crisis. Their commander, Wolf, has slowly begun to degenerate into a Demoniac. He turns on XAT by infecting everyone, except for Hermann and Amanda. Their comrades die to protect the two from becoming Demoniac. The two escape via helicopter, but Hermann is forced to crash the helicopter, killing himself. Using an XAT Paladin, Amanda flees and pursues Joseph.

=== Joseph arc ===
The arc follows Joseph's past. It turns out that Joseph was an Outsider that had been adopted by a church after his parents froze to death, using their remaining body heat to keep him alive in front of the church. He spent his childhood in a tightly knit community, helping the priest look after the other orphans' needs, tend to their home and helping people in need. After the nearby Jever river overflowed, the church became crowded with homeless citizens and wounded seeking refuge—the agitation eventually driving the old priest (who also was Joseph's paternal figure) to death by exhaustion. It was shortly thereafter that he met Magwald Xargin—then an enthusiastic researcher hoping to distribute medication to the impoverished population. It was through Xargin (and his hospitalization after the church was burned by xenophobic citizens) that Joseph met his elder sister, Alexandra 'Sasha' Jobson. For the next few weeks, Joseph developed a close friendship with Xargin, with whom he shared a deep desire to help those in need. However, the medication they provided to the bereaved population and Outsiders (even going as far as trying to smuggle them out of Xargin and Sasha's university—then led by Victor Statchus) proved ineffective and one night, Sasha was beaten to death by Outsider-hating citizens. It was then, through the letter that she had left behind, that Joseph learned that Sasha's research was primarily focusing on military-oriented cybernetics. Feeling all hope was lost, Xargin conveys his bereavement to Victor, who decides that he is worthy of receiving the nanotechnology that Sasha had been working on. After Xargin rebels against Victor, Joseph tries to stop his erstwhile friend but is mortally wounded. In a last plea, Joseph tries to convince Xargin that life was still worth living. In response, the former scientist infects the teen with nanomachine-infested blood, turning him into an Amalgam. The next day, Victor Statchus gives him the GARM motorcycle and entrusts him with tracking down the now renegade Magwald Xargin.

=== Hermann arc ===
Amanda and Joseph are brought to the castle of the organization Zwolf, an organisation that is working to defeat Xargin. Amanda is forced to join as they are holding Malek captive. As Amanda falls into depression about Malek, who is in a coma, Hermann appears before her. Whilst she is happy that her colleague is still alive, he appears to have lost parts of his memory. When his memory starts coming back to him, he realises that Beatrice had turned him into an Amalgam. He loses control and goes on a killing spree. Amanda chases him and tells him that by giving up on himself now, it would be the same as giving up on Gerd Frentzen. This, combined with the fact that he feels he has to live to avenge his XAT colleagues, causes Hermann to regain control of himself. He heads to take on Wolf. Joseph also appears on the scene—but due to a device Zwolf has installed, he has lost control of himself. Wolf escapes, knowing that Hermann would stay to avenge Gerd. Hermann eventually follows Wolf, when he realises his presence is getting Amanda into trouble with Zwolf. Amanda follows Hermann, but runs into Snow, a friend of Joseph. After a brief conversation, Amanda heads to the XAT HQ to help Hermann, and Snow decides to help Joseph regain control. Amanda and Hermann kill Wolf, with the help of Al, another XAT colleague returned from the dead. Al ends his own life, as he feels being brought back to life is "disgusting". Hermann and Amanda invade the Zwolf HQ in order to get Malek back. The two escape to an orphanage run by Amanda's aunt. Beatrice comes to the orphanage, in order to claim data that Amanda has been trusted with by Zwolf. She explains that she is the one responsible for causing Gerd, Malek and Wolf to lose control of themselves. Hermann is enraged and takes on Beatrice. He starts to struggle and, in order to protect Amanda, realizes he needs Malek's help. Malek awakens from his coma and helps Hermann defeat Beatrice. However, Hermann protects Malek from Beatrice's final attack and dies in Amanda's arms trying to tell his feelings for her. It is also implied when he asks Malek if he could have been a good big brother to him.

=== Amanda arc ===
Malek chases after Xargin using Hermann's Triple six motorcycle. Joseph realises and tells Amanda to wait at the orphanage, as he will bring back Malek. Malek loses to Xargin, but Joseph intervenes in time. Joseph and Xargin begin their fight, but Joseph is defeated. Meanwhile, Gerd and Hermann see Joseph appear in purgatory with them. Gerd decides to help Joseph, explaining to Hermann that he does not have a grudge against Joseph and admires his strong will. After being given the keys to Triple Six by Hermann, he enters Joseph's body. He loses and then Hermann does the same, but the result is the same. Joseph finally awakens and fights with his own power this time. His power surpasses Xargin's though is still unable to completely subdue him, but using the anti-nanomachine "Isis" (which was created using the data stored in Sasha's memory) he is able to sacrifice his life to end Xargin's. Years later, we see that XAT has been reformed with Amanda as its field commander; Malek has also enrolled as a member of the newly formed guerilla unit. Gerd, Hermann, Joseph and the others have been brought back as AI. Amalgamized humans are now a part of society despite being discriminated against. It is hinted that XAT's new primary objective is not only to protect the human populace from Amalgam threats but to also protect Amalgamized humans from discrimination and help integrate Amalgamized humans into society.

== Characters ==
Some of the characters in Blassreiter. Front: Joseph Jobson in Demoniac form, Amanda Werner. Middle: Joseph Jobson in human form, Elea, Hermann Saltza and Gerd Frentzen in Demoniac form.

=== Main characters ===
Joseph Jobson
Voiced by: Masaya Matsukaze (Japanese); Todd Haberkorn (English)

Joseph is a lone, mysterious figure who serves as a Demoniac hunter. He is often seen either talking to Elea or whittling a statue of the Virgin Mary and is considered as a good candidate for the role of Blassreiter since his extraordinary sense of self-control allows him to retain his sanity, at the cost of remaining weaker than other more 'open-minded' opponents like Xargin or Beatrice. During the course of the story, he causes motorcycle star Gerd Frentzen to become paralyzed. As a result, he becomes one of XAT's primary targets (he then becomes known as 'Blue' due to his body color). It was after one of his run-ins with the police forces that he befriends Malik, Amanda's adopted brother, with whom he shares similar experiences of bullying and social isolation. He is later reunited with the revived Sasha (who now bore white hair and a cybernetic implant in her left eye) and agrees to receiving the Pale Horse physical enhancement program, which will theoretically allow him to develop greater strength at the cost of his own self-control. The experiment later proves successful, turning himself into a berserker-like Blassreiter with red outlines instead of blue ones. But in the berserker state, haunted by illusions, he can't tell the difference between friend or foe, even attacking Sasha and Amanda. Only Snow was able to bring him to his senses after sustaining heavy injuries. Joseph fights outside Zwölf's base with Beatrice after the confrontation with Snow. He nearly kills her before Xargin interrupts and defeats him, claiming that the power Joseph had was fake.

In his Demoniac form, Joseph can make use of an energy whip, which he can also turn into a narrow-bladed sword. He uses the GARM motorcycle (masquerading as a Yotsubishi custom model), which he can fuse with once transforming. There is an A.I. installed in the GARM motorcycle called Elea who has the appearance of a scantly clothed, dark haired girl with horns on her head. If the main characters are the four horsemen of the Apocalypse, he would represent the black horse or Famine.

Amanda Werner
Voiced by: Shizuka Itō (Japanese); Jamie Marchi (English)

A female officer of XAT. She is Hermann's partner, and Malik's adoptive sister. She is hesitant in her orders to kill Blue/Joseph, and after Malik is turned into a Demoniac, attempts to stop XAT from killing him. When almost all XAT officers and civilian personnel were killed or turned to Amalgams, Amanda was one of two human survivors along with Hermann, and the only one to apparently save herself when the helicopter used in their escape was destroyed. She was later admitted into Zwölf and offered a role as an operative, although she accepted only for Malik's sake, proudly stating that so long someone from XAT lived, XAT itself continued to exist. During the chaos that preceded Xargin's assault, she stormed Zwölf's HQ with Hermann and rescued Malik, turning to her aunt for protection and shelter. She stayed there when Joseph went to his doomed fight with Xargin, and in the years later she managed to rebuild XAT, serving as an instructor to the new task force. Following Joseph's death, after the end of the series, she becomes the new pilot of GARM and thus Elea's partner.

While Amanda is an ordinary human, she shows a high degree of experience in firearms and melee fights similar to her former colleagues. Also, after the destruction of XAT, she becomes the pilot of her team's lone remaining Paladin, which is embedded with the names of her deceased friends as a memento of their sacrifice.

Hermann Saltza
Voiced by: Kenta Miyake (Japanese); Travis Willingham (English)

Amanda's partner and an officer of XAT, Hermann was a good friend of Gerd Frentzen, having raced with him for a long time. He was known as reckless and more often than not ignored orders, much to his superior's chagrin and his colleagues' amusement, though he stayed loyal to his duty to hunt down Amalgams. Gerd's transformation in an Amalgam left him stunned and desperate, and he and Malik were the only ones to defend Gerd even after he started behaving erratically. Seeing Joseph - or Blue as he knew him - killing his friend worsened his condition, fueling his extreme hatred toward Joseph and blaming him for Gerd's fate. When Wolf revealed his nature as an Amalgam and took over XAT, Hermann was the only human survivor who escapes along with Amanda by piloting a helicopter that ended up crash-landing soon after he ejected Amanda to safety. Laying on the brink of death, he was saved by Beatrice, who gave him her blood and turned him into an Amalgam. Although following his resurrection he suffered from amnesia and couldn't remember their encounter. He discovered the truth inside Zwölf HQ, where he fled in a frenzy after stealing the prototype '666 Bike' (a floating platform-motorcycle designed for Joseph to use). Pursued by Amanda and initially willing to find and kill Wolf alone as retribution for his dead friends of XAT, he agreed to team-up with her and rescue Malik. He ends up fighting Beatrice soon after, recognizing her as the one responsible not only for his, but for Gerd's and Malik's fate as well. He lands a killing blow during their fierce battle, and Beatrice uses her final attack on Malik before dying. Hermann took the hit instead and died soon after in Amanda's arms.

Hermann's Demoniac form is that of a red-armoured, demon-horned warrior with spiral motifs on his shoulder pads and head, armed with an enormous two-handed halberd equipped with a retractable chain-linked blade. He makes proficient use of the motorcycle stolen from Zwölf, using it as a floating platform for aerial combat. If the series is based on the Book of Revelation, then Hermann is the red horseman of War.

Gerd Frentzen
Voiced by: Unshō Ishizuka (Japanese); Christopher Sabat (English)

A famed motorcycle racer with white hair. Due to a Demoniac attack, he was rendered paralyzed from the waist down, an event which ended his career as a champion and alienated him from both his team and girlfriend. On the brink of despair he was approached by Beatrice and offered the chance to restore his lost legs, becoming a Demoniac in the process. Initially working the same way as Joseph and hunting down Amalgams he was hailed as a hero and a savior, but after discovering that his former team manager and his girlfriend Jill had been plotting behind his back, he tried to kill them in a murderous rage and was branded as a monster. With only Hermann and Malik supporting him, he quickly succumbed to his powers and began to see everyone around him as another Amalgam. He fought fiercely with Joseph several times, and during one of these fights regained his sanity long enough to ask Joseph to kill him if he lost control again, as he had just recently slaughtered his girlfriend-turned-Amalgam in broad daylight. When he does lose control again during a race with his friend Hermann Saltza, he manages one last feat of will and drops his guard enough to allow Joseph to administer a coup de grace, ending his tormented existence. In the final episode, both he and Hermann are seen resting together in purgatory and assists Joseph during his final battle against Xargin by using his Blassreiter powers on Joseph's body.

As a Demoniac, Gerd was exceptionally well versed in melee combat, fighting with a pair of energy-bladed boomerangs attached to his back or protruding sharp energy blades from his feet, knees or elbows. His armoured form was mostly white, with his helmet being purplish-red.

Malek Yildrim Werner
Voiced by: Junko Minagawa (Japanese); Micah Solusod (English)

Amanda Werner's adopted brother and an ardent fan of Gerd Frentzen. Ridiculed frequently his school's delinquents, he skips classes to avoid being discriminated against due to his origins. Eventually, he meets Joseph, with whom he shares similar childhood experiences, and takes care of him after he is wounded during a battle with XAT. Distraught by Gerd's destroyed reputation and the suicide of his only friend (who suffered from the same delinquents' actions), he is approached by Beatrice and offered a pill much in the same way as Gerd, becoming a Demoniac as well. With his new powers, Malik initially thinks that he is to be a protector of justice allowed to punish the oppressors of the weak in whatever way he sees fit, exacting revenge by killing the delinquents. He battles XAT and Joseph, before he is shielded against Al and Brad's sniping. Escaping with Joseph into the countryside, he tends to him until Xargin appears and easily defeats him with such power that he slipped into a catatonic state. He is kept by Zwölf as a research subject, though is eventually rescued by his sister and Hermann. He wakes up during Hermann's fight against Beatrice, and is shielded from a mortal attack once again. He resolves to battle Xargin again, and although he fares better, he was nonetheless weaker and was again beaten easily. Years after Joseph's death, during the finale, he is shown as a nineteen-year-old teenager, clothed in Joseph's trademark coat and riding a red version of his GRAM motorcycle, equipped with an A.I. named Maria.

In his Demoniac form, Malik has odd-shaped yellow armour with satyr-like feet and curved horns on his helmet. While not extremely strong - for Demoniac standards - he shows incredible speed and dexterity, so much so that he leaves after-images of himself when moving. He's armed with a long energy whip that can be turned into a dual-bladed sword. The whip can also rotate in a spiral-like motion, creating a small combat shield strong enough to easily repel small arms fire. If the four characters are the four horsemen of the Apocalypse, Malik would be death. Even though he is the only one of the four not to die.

Magwald Xargin
Voiced by: Junichi Suwabe (Japanese); J. Michael Tatum (English)

The primary antagonist of the series, Magwald Xargin was once an enthusiastic and generous researcher in his university years who tried his best to help the immigrant population, finding it unthinkable that humans wouldn't help their peers and opposing the racist views that were commonplace in his country. He was Sasha's lover and a great supporter of her research, though he didn't know its objectives, believing it to be a revolutionary medical discovery. The extreme acts of intolerance he suffered, from the fire at the church where he met Joseph for the first time to the death of Sasha, drove him to disillusionment and utter despair, and when Victor Strachus bestowed him the power of the Amalgams, to complete madness. Now driven by a Messianic complex, he saw humanity as a hopeless race incapable of anything other than harm and destruction and vowed to exterminate them all himself, replacing them with a much more pure population of Amalgams. He wounded Joseph in the same event that saw him become the enemy of mankind and granted him his blood, turning him into his fiercest foe, and sometime later stumbled upon Beatrice and her dead horse. He resurrected them both and took them in as his right arm and mare respectively. While driven by genocidal ideals, Xargin is very calm, polite, and religious, often reading the Bible or citing prayers. His very appearance reflects his belief of being a savior, as he's always bare-footed and clothed in white, with almost feminine facial features. Xargin showed himself rarely, although he beat Malik and Joseph easily when he made his second appearance and took part in the assault of the Zwölf HQ, killing Victor Strachus. He is finally stopped after killing Joseph by being showered with Isis nanomachines, which reduce him and his whole army of Amalgams to ash, which he surprisingly takes in stride as the will of God. In the hologram that was shown at the end of the series he was present in the background, next to Beatrice.

Xargin can be considered the most powerful Amalgam in the entire series. In fact, he is more than capable of defeating Joseph and Malik without even assuming his Demoniac form. As a Demoniac he appears as a towering, armoured humanoid reminiscent of a king or a warlord, with spiraling horns protruding from his head and four tentacles on his back. He fights with an aptly oversized greatsword, which he wields easily with one hand. Before his final fight with Joseph no one ever wounded him, being impervious to even the most powerful weaponry of the Paladins. His powers were somewhat unusual in that he showed a degree of pyrokinesis, the ability to shoot powerful energy blasts, and to heal or even revive living beings.

=== Secondary ===
Wolf Göring

Voiced by: Fumihiko Tachiki (Japanese); Bob Carter (English)

The commander of XAT. Wolf is an imposing and powerfully built man with dark skin, whose strictness is often at odds with Hermann's rebellious nature. Wolf was wounded during the transportation of Gerd's infected girlfriend Jil Hoffman, after he fought her with a taser when she awoke as an Amalgam. From then on he began to show strange symptoms of illness that Beatrice confirmed to be signs of him changing into an Amalgam. Seduced by Beatrice Grese and warped into serving Xargin's cause, he infected most of his subordinates, hoping they would remain at his side when they turned to Amalgams as well. Wolf's actions after his infection were moderated by friendship toward them, as he was distraught after mortally wounding Al and Brad as they bought time for Hermann and Amanda to escape. After the destruction of XAT he tried to revive Al, Brad, and Lena with his blood, but succeeded only in reviving Al. He continued to direct his task force from there on, albeit as a human-hunting one. He fought against Amanda and a Demoniac-turned Hermann while counting on Al's help, but was fooled when Al regained his memories and blew most of his head off, allowing Hermann to slash him in half and kill him for good. He later appears with the other deceased characters with an apologetic look, asking Amanda for forgiveness.

Wolf's Demoniac form is an enormous, powerful humanoid with gorilla-like features and a horned head shaped like a skull. Though slower than most Amalgams he's immensely strong and resilient, using his tank-like armour to fend off most attacks bare-handed. He can also elongate his arms, rocket-punching his enemies with extreme strength.

Bradley "Brad" Guildford

Voiced by: Yuichi Nakamura (Japanese); Chuck Huber (English)

One of the two snipers of XAT, he's in charge of shooting Amalgams from afar with his anti-tank sniper rifle. A somewhat stoic person, with his hair covering his eyes most of the time, and Lena's boyfriend back in the days when they served together in the military before joining XAT. He was infected by Wolf and managed to escort Hermann and Amanda to safety at the helipad of XAT's HQ, but ends up mortally wounded by Lena's Paladin, which had fused with an Amalgam. He killed her himself, using his powers just enough to allow him to turn his hand into a barrel and shoot her in the head with the same bullet she gave him sometimes before. He is later killed by Wolf. Both he and Lena refuse Wolf's blood when he tries to revive them, and turn to ash. He is former GSG-9 special forces before being tasked with XAT duty.

Alvin "Al" Lutz

Voiced by: Nobuyuki Hiyama (Japanese); Eric Vale (English)

XAT's second sniper, Alvin, or Al for short, is somewhat the opposite of Brad, as he appears to be a laid-back and carefree individual. Although he is also much more aggressive. He's one of the team members protecting Hermann and Amanda while XAT is being destroyed by Wolf, and stays behind them before reaching the helipad to fend off the Amalgams' attacks. Killed by Wolf, he accepts his blood and is revived as a Demoniac, aiding his former leader with complete obedience until he almost kills Amanda and Hermann. When he remembers what was done to him and XAT, he turns on and kills Wolf. He does not reunite with his friends, choosing instead to die alone by blowing his head off with his rifle. He like Brad is a former GSG-9 special forces.

While well versed as a sniper, Al is far more precise and deadly as a sharp-shooting Demoniac. His armour is dark purple and he has curved horns on his head, plus a single yellow eye that occupied most of his face. His rifle was directly linked to his right arm, assuming a bio-mechanical appearance in the process. He has three dog tags around the barrel of his rifle; probably his, Brad's and Lena's.

Mei-Fong Liu

Voiced by: Aya Endō (Japanese); Trina Nishimura (English)

XAT's communications and tactical specialist. She usually stays with Wolf in the Fennek armored vehicle during XAT-led operations in the field. Her true nature is that of a double agent planted by Victor, a cyborg, one of the three Apocalypse Knights, and the pilot of the Scale Rider; a bulky but extremely agile ultra-high altitude fighter-bomber which serves as the other two Knights' transport. She is actually a clone of Victor Stachus' granddaughter, as she was plagued by an extremely short lifespan which would have her dead after a mere 20 years of life. She takes part in the attempt to fend off the nuclear assault launched by the United States and the UN, and dies after ramming the Scale Rider into an unmanned nuclear bomber in Earth's low orbit.

Victor Stachus

Voiced by: Atsushi Ono (Japanese); Bradley Campbell (English)

The director and commander-in-chief of the XAT task force, Victor was actually the true leader of Zwölf having established XAT only as a means to study the Amalgams. He directed the university where Sasha discovered the nanomachines that brought about the creation of Amalgams as bioweapons and was the one who offered their power to Xargin, turning him into his enemy soon after. During the assault on Zwölf HQ he succeeded in deleting any information on the Isis anti-nanomachines from the organization's mainframe but was confronted and brutally killed by Xargin, who fused Victor with the base servers. He did not die however, instead becoming a sort of A.I. inside Zwölf's software. He assists Sasha in her attempt to shoot down the barrage of nuclear missiles directed at Germany, and is destroyed in the process.

Alexandra "Sasha" Jobson

Voiced by: Hitomi Nabatame (Japanese); Stephanie Young (English)

Sasha is Joseph's older sister, and a rarity among immigrants in that she graduated from a public university despite her background and origins. Presented as a kind-hearted and cheerful woman, Sasha was loved by both Joseph and Xargin, who was interested by her research in the field of nanomachines, which he thought was for the purpose of aiding the medical community. This however was a lie, as her work was for the military, which was bent on the development of biological weapons. She was beaten to death by racist citizens, and died due to the injuries she suffered. She reappeared years later at Zwölf HQ, revived as a cyborg with much of her body rebuilt into a more muscular physique, shorter white hair, and a cybernetic green eye which replaced her original left. She also had a number of plugs along the left side of her face and in other parts of her body, such as her neck. Much colder than before, Sasha is one of the Apocalypse Knights and the pilot of the Bow Rider; a powerful energy cannon that doubles as a bipedal white mecha focused on long-range fire support. Plagued by what she had created back when she was human and what her brother had to endure, she sought atonement by means of death, and defends Germany from the impending nuclear strikes at the end of the series with Mei Feng and Shido. She dies when the Bow Rider overheats and explodes with her still inside it.

Shido Kasagi

Voiced by: Unshou Ishizuka (Japanese); John Swasey (English)

A well-built and imposing man with an air of coldness and a gruff attitude, Shido is of Japanese origins, having left a wife and two children to serve as one of the Apocalypse Knights. He is the pilot of the Sword Rider; a red canine-shaped mecha armed with missile launcher and prehensile, energy-firing claws mounted on extensible cables. Shido is presented as merciless, insulting Amanda and her deceased friends. He does this only to test her resolve however, and leaves clues for her about how to find Malek later on. It was revealed that Shido became a cyborg out of altruism toward his family, as his wife was from Hiroshima and suffered from genetic disease stemming from the atomic bombing of the city. He donated most of his organs to his children so to let them survive, and underwent the process that made him a Knight. He fights fiercely against Xargin during the assault on Zwölf HQ and is wounded, but survives and takes part in the Knights' attempt to fend off the nuclear strikes against Germany. He manages to destroy the first barrage of missiles while under fire by a formation of F-35 Lightning, and self-destructs an already heavily damaged Sword Rider to destroy the last two missiles, dying in the explosion.

Beatrice Grese

Voiced by: Sayaka Ohara (Japanese); Lydia Mackay (English)

A mysterious doctor who works at Clermont Medical Hospital and gives Gerd Frentzen a pill that would cure his paralysis under the condition that he would keep it confidential. Later on, Beatrice also gives Malek a pill as well and even brainwashes Wolf over to her cause. She turns out to be working with Xargin to replace humanity with Demoniacs, which she claims are evolved humans. Beatrice is eventually attacked and wounded by the Apocalypse Knights and ends up disowning Wolf when he loses control of the Demoniacs. During the invasion of Zwölf, she's severely wounded by Joseph in his Blassreiter form, but is saved by Xargin. She is later left to take care of the Zwölf castle after Xargin leaves. While there, Beatrice finds out that the Isis files are missing and tracks down Amanda and Hermann. She is then confronted by Hermann in the forest and tells him that she's responsible for what happen to Gerd and Malek. They engage in a fierce battle. Beatrice is eventually defeated by Hermann with the help of Malek.

As a Demoniac, Beatrice takes the form of an armoured female with blades instead of feet and a large net-like skirt made of energy. Only her nose is visible, as her entire head is covered and sports two large horns similar to Xargin's. While capable of both flight and powerful in melee combat, Beatrice can also blast high-strength beams of energy.

=== Minor ===
Elea

Voiced by: Kana Hanazawa (Japanese); Monica Rial (English)

The A.I. installed in the GARM motorcycle, Elea has the appearance of a scantly clothed, dark haired girl with horns on her head. She usually criticizes Joseph to no avail, and calls the Demoniacs beautiful.

Matthew Grant

Voiced by: Hiroyuki Kinoshita (Japanese); Jonathan Brooks (English)

Former racing team manager of Gerd Frentzen, who turned into a Demoniac after 60 hours of coming in contact with Gerd's blood. Was killed in his Demoniac form by Joseph. He was having an affair with Jill Hoffmann behind Gerd's back and came in contact with Gerd's blood when he stabbed Gerd in defense of Jill.

Igor

Voiced by: Wataru Hatano (Japanese); Brad Hawkins (English)

A racer who was a part of Gerd's former team, he was wounded by Gerd after he became the leading pilot of his team and is an arrogant but skilled racer.

Jill Hoffmann

Voiced by: Kumi Sakuma (Japanese); Colleen Clinkenbeard (English)

Gerd Frentzen's former lover, who ended her relationship with him due to his paralysis and cheated on him behind his back with Matthew Grant. Gerd found out and nearly killed her by strangulation. She eventually becomes a Demoniac due to exposure to Matthew's blood, and is later killed by Gerd.

Snow

Voiced by: Mai Nakahara (Japanese); Cherami Leigh (English)

A girl who became a Blassreiter after getting infected by Joseph. Joseph saved her in the past and she in turn goes to bring about Joseph to his senses while sustaining heavy injuries in the battle with him. She seems to show some affection for Joseph as seen in episode 19. Since she is not seen again afterwards and her hologram is displayed in the final episode, it may be assumed that she died of her injuries. Snow is also featured as the lead character in a manga spin off.

== Terminology ==
- Demoniacs: or Amalgams are humans that are re-animated from the dead into monstrous forms that are both agile and strong. An ability that is unique to them is that they can fuse with any type of machinery or metal to their bodies according to their will. However, humans that are alive can also become demoniacs but in their cases, some use the power for what they believe as justice, some lose sight of what's important and abuse their power, some use their power to realize their ambitions and other use it for the sole purpose of revenge. In order for a human to become a demoniac, they have to come in contact with demoniac blood or via contact with any part of the Amalgam's body. This, in turn, exposes them to the untraceable nano machines in the Demoniac's blood. The nano machines then begin to transform the protein cells found in the body at an accelerated pace causing a fast-paced evolution. All this is explained by Beatrice to Wolf, who is a Demoniac herself. Re-animated corpses in amalgam form look mostly alike while amalgam-turned humans all have different forms.
- XAT: Xenogenesis Assault Team. A Special Police Division formed to combat Demoniacs by the Federal Police with most of their members ride motorcycles. Their headquarters is in a church in Bifröst. It had been disbanded after Wolf had its personnel infected and turned them to Demoniacs. After the events of Blassreiter, the German federal government rebuilds XAT with the new mandate of protecting people who can turn to Blassreiters.
- Zwölf: Zwölf, means 'Twelve' in German, is an undercover organization formerly known as the Knights Templar. They have converted an ancient castle into a state-of-the-art research facility and base with launch facilities for the Apocalypse Knights, as well as a squad of Paladins. Security is maintained by biometrics-scanning robots and armed guards.
- Apocalypse Knights: A set of combat vehicles designed by Zwölf to combat Demoniacs. It is composed of three smaller units called the Scale Rider, Bow Rider, and Sword Rider, which can separate to attack individual targets. Each individual unit is controlled by a cyborg pilot. Weapons consist of a laser particle cannon, smaller lasers, laser-guided bombs, rockets, and energy blades.
- Paladins: A special mecha provided to XAT. The operator can use it as a walking mech or as a fast motorcycle.
- Outsiders: A lower class in this fictional German society, which potentially refers to immigrants or people who are born poor. They are commonly discriminated against by other members of society.

== Production ==
The following are the main staff members for Blassreiter.

Staff
Director	Ichiro Itano
Series Structure	Ichiro Itano and Gen Urobuchi
Chief Writer	Yasuko Kobayashi
Original Character & Mechanical Designs	Niθ
Character Design & Chief Animation Director	Naoyuki Onda
Mechanical Design	Makoto Ishiwata
Set Designs	Tomoyuki Aoki
Prop and Texture Design	Keiichiro Ito
Setting Support	Chihiro Maruyama
Color Setting	Kimiko Kitazawa
Art Director	Hidenori Sano
CGI Director	Naoki Ao
In-between Animation Checker	Ritsuko Watanabe
Filming Director	Kojiro Hayashi
Sound Effects Director	Jin Aketagawa

The show was first announced on November 1, 2007, when Gonzo and Nitroplus at the Nitro Super Sonic event with Ichiro Itano as the director with Naoyuki Onda doing the character and mechanical designs of Blassreiter. In addition, a manga adaption of Blassreiter was created with the supervision of Gen Urobuchi and Yasuko Kobayashi as it was written by Noboru Kimura and drawn by Shū Hirose.

Nitroplus had announced the creation of a Blassreiter promotional video posted at their official website.

Norihiko Hibino had said in an interview that he was recruited to do Blassreiter's music. In another interview with Original Sound Version, he notes that the entire GEM Impact team is actually working on Blassreiter, and that the team has provided approximately 120 minutes of original music for the series.

== Media ==
=== Anime ===
The anime episodes were released on Japanese television and on to three internet video providers including BOST, CrunchyRoll and YouTube on 5 April 2008 by GDH. It is directed by Ichiro Itano and written by Yasuko Kobayashi. The show had aired 24 episodes from April 5 to September 27, 2008. Blassreiter had been previously aired on TV by AT-X, Chiba TV, Sun TV, TV Kanagawa and TV Saitama. In North America, the series was released on DVD by Funimation Entertainment in 2009 in two parts and 2010 in a complete boxset.

=== DVD & Blu-ray ===
Blassreiter was released on DVD, with the 1st volume released on August 8, 2008 and the 12th and last released on July 21, 2009. On January 6, 2016, a complete Blu-ray boxed set was released in Japan.

=== Figures ===
Figures of Joseph in Blassreiter form had been released in August 2008 with other figures of Joseph, Elea and Joseph in his GARM motorcycle were created and released by Mega Hobby with other figures included Gerd in Blassreiter form and Joseph in his upgraded Blassreiter look.

=== Print ===
Blassreiter Judgement, Volume 1

A Blassreiter gaiden manga called Blassreiter: Genetic, which centers on Snow, was published in Champion Red and compiled in three volumes by Akita Shoten from 2007 to 2009. A light novel version published by Kadokawa Shoten, Blassreiter Judgement, was released in July 2008.

A Blassreiter Databook was released in August 2008.

=== Merchandise ===
Some of the official Blassreiter merchandise include shirts, a ballcap, posters and a XAT strap.

=== Music ===
The Blassreiter OST was released on September 10, 2008, with 32 tracks on Disc 1 and 27 tracks on Disc 2.

GRANRODEO's OP "Nonsense Afterimage" (出鱈目な残像, Detarame na Zanzō) was released on May 14, 2008. Minami Kuribayashi's unripe hero was released on July 23, 2008.

Aki Misato's sad rain was released on May 14, 2008. Kanako Itō's A Wish For The Stars was released on August 6, 2008.

==== Themes ====
Opening themes
"Nonsense Afterimage" (出鱈目な残像, Detarame na Zanzō) by GRANRODEO

Episodes 2–14

"unripe hero" by Minami Kuribayashi

Episodes 15–24

Ending themes
"sad rain" by Aki Misato

Episodes 1–11

"Separating moment" by Aki Misato

Episode 12

"A Wish For The Stars" by Kanako Itō

Episodes 13–23

"Sweet Lies" by Kanako Itō

Episodes 24
