= Otomedius =

2007 video game

- Arcade flyer
- Developer: Konami
- Publisher: Konami
- Designer: Mine Yoshizaki
- Composers: Hiroki Koga; Ruzarin Kashiwagi (Xbox 360)
- Series: Otomedius
- Platforms: Arcade, Xbox 360
- Release: Arcade: JP: October 15, 2007; Xbox 360: JP: November 20, 2008
- Genre: Scrolling shooter
- Modes: Single-player, multiplayer
- Arcade system: e-Amusement

Otomedius is a side-scrolling shooter video game by Konami which features personification of space fighters from various Konami games. The game's title is a pun, being a portmanteau of the terms "Otome" and "Gradius", with a set of equipment resembling space fighters from Gradius.

Otomedius was released as an arcade game in Japan on October 15, 2007. It received an Xbox 360 port titled Otomedius Gorgeous! in 2008. A sequel, Otomedius Excellent, was released in 2011.

== Versions ==
Otomedius is Konami's first arcade shooter since Gradius IV: Resurrection in 1999. The arcade title was announced in AOU2007 Amusement Expo on February 16, 2006, with test version available.

Unlike previous Konami's arcade shooters, player can continue after losing all lives using a single credit. Player can choose which stage to play, with maximum of three stages playable using 1 credit.

There are 4 stages in each game, with 4 (normal, hard, expert, ultimate) difficulty settings.

Player can choose which mission to complete in any order within a game, but a completed mission cannot be chosen more than twice per game.

At the end of each mission, the fighter is given a rank from S (highest) to E (lowest) based on score, obtained element, collected capsules, received damage, life loss. The rank determines ST points earned by the fighter. ST point is also determined by:

== Reception ==
Eurogamer editor Jonti Davies rated Otomedius Gorgeous! 7/10 for unbalanced Gorgeous Mode game play, slowdown in Gorgeous mode, but he states the game has more personality than any shoot 'em up since Choaniki.

In 2008, Konami released a set of figures based on the main characters of the game. These designs use the Konami MMS2nd figure as their base, the same used in their Busou Shinki line. The sets also each contained 2 penguin mascots which are common enemies in the game Parodius.

It is a series of digital comic serialized on Weekly Konami Magazine, based on Otomedius characters. First issue was released on 2007-10-19. First volume was released free for i-revo subscribers.
