= Music of the Metal Gear series =

The Metal Gear video games consist of 17 different albums, totaling over 940 minutes of music within the 11 games. Konami served as their own record label for all their Metal Gear music albums, with King Records serving as their initial distributor up until Metal Gear Solid 2: Sons of Liberty. From Metal Gear Solid 3: Snake Eater and onward, distribution was handled by Sony Music. Several different producers were used for different games. These include Konami, Masahiro Hinami, Noriakio Kamura, Norihiko Hibino, Tojima, Harry Gregson-Williams. Konami producing 6 out of the 11 Metal Gear games. The games used many different genres of music throughout the games. They are as follows: breakbeat, classical, drum and bass, electronic, hip hop, jazz, ambient, acoustic, Latin American, electronic rock, industrial metal, alternative metal, hard rock, power metal, neoclassical, romantic music, lounge, and rock and roll.

== Albums ==
=== Solid Snake: Metal Gear 2 ===
Solid Snake: Metal Gear 2

Soundtrack album to Metal Gear 2: Solid Snake by Konami Kukeiha Club
- Released: April 5, 1991
- Genres: Video game music, Chiptune
- Length: 60:05
- Label: King

Solid Snake: Metal Gear 2 is the official soundtrack to Konami's 1990 MSX2 video game Metal Gear 2: Solid Snake. The music composition is credited to Konami Kukeiha Club and the CD was released on April 5, 1991. The music was recorded from the sound source used to compose the in-game music, which was generated by Konami's proprietary SCC chip.

The soundtrack was re-released on September 23, 1998 as part of the 2-CD bundle titled Konami MSX Super Best Antiques, which also included the Gofer no Yabou Episode 2 and Space Manbow albums.

Arranged music based on Metal Gear 2: Solid Snake were used for the VR Training disc in Metal Gear Solid: Integral (which was released in North America as Metal Gear Solid: VR Missions). Additionally, Integral features two hidden tunes based on Metal Gear 2 available via a secret codec frequency in the main game. One is an arranged version of the "Theme of Solid Snake", while the other is an arrangement of "Zanzibar Breeze." "Theme of Solid Snake" made an appearance in Nintendo's crossover fighting game Super Smash Bros. Brawl on the Shadow Moses Island stage.

Metal Gear 2: Solid Snake original soundtrack (disc 1)
No.	Title	Length
1.	"Theme of Solid Snake"	3:17
2.	"Zanzibar Breeze"	3:06
3.	"A Notice"	0:12
4.	"First Instruction"	0:54
5.	"Frequency 140.85"	2:50
6.	"Level 3 Warning"	1:14
7.	"Return to Dust"	2:47
8.	"Killers"	1:37
9.	"Tears"	3:15
10.	"The Front Line"	2:08
11.	"Chasing the Green Beret"	0:27
12.	"Shallow"	0:53
13.	"The Battle Against Time"	1:15
14.	"Advance Immediately"	2:07
15.	"Mechanic"	1:10
16.	"Imminent"	1:50
17.	"Night Fall"	1:40
18.	"Level 1 Warning"	2:17
19.	"An Advance"	1:39
20.	"Reprieve of the Doctor"	1:28
21.	"Natasha's Death"	2:21
22.	"Zanzibarland National Anthem"	0:16
23.	"Swing, Swing ~ "A" Jam Blues"	1:31
24.	"Zanzibarland National Anthem Part 2"	0:16
25.	"Under the Cloud of Darkness"	1:26
26.	"Fight into Enemy Territory"	0:50
27.	"Infiltration"	1:31
28.	"In Security"	1:15
29.	"Wavelet"	2:22
30.	"Big Boss"	1:02
31.	"Spiral"	1:32
32.	"Escape"	1:57
33.	"Return"	2:19
34.	"Red Sun"	3:11
35.	"Farewell"	1:51
36.	"After Image"	0:07
37.	"Disposable Life"	0:11

=== Metal Gear Solid Original Game Soundtrack ===
Metal Gear Solid Original Game Soundtrack

Soundtrack album to Metal Gear Solid by the Metal Gear series
- Released: September 23, 1998
- Genres: Ambient, Classical, Electronic, Game, Neoclassical, Romantic
- Length: 66:24
- Label: King
- Producer: Konami

Metal Gear Solid Original Game Soundtrack is the official soundtrack to Konami's 1998 stealth game Metal Gear Solid. Most of the original music was composed and performed by the Konami Computer Entertainment (KCE) Sound Team Japan (comprising Takanari Ishiyama, Gigi Meroni, Kazuki Muraoka, Lee Jeon Myung and Hiroyuki Togo), with the exception of the "Metal Gear Solid Main Theme", composed by TAPPY, and "The Best Is Yet to Come", composed by Rika Muranaka and performed by Aoife Ní Fhearraigh. The CD was released on September 23, 1998 – three weeks after the Japanese release of the game.

A total of three versions of the soundtrack were released, with the "Metal Gear Solid Control Mix" track missing from the earliest version. Limited print editions of the Japanese copy and the standard European copy have cardboard sleeves accompanied with the discs jewel case. The final edition of the Japanese print does not come with the cardboard sleeve.

Music played in-game has a synthetic feel with increased pace and introduction of strings during tense moments, with a looping style endemic to video games. Overtly cinematic music, with stronger orchestral and choral elements, appears in cutscenes. The soundtrack was released on September 23, 1998, under the King Records label.

Metal Gear Solid original game soundtrack (disc 1)
No.	Title	Length
1.	"Metal Gear Solid Main Theme"	2:42
2.	"Introduction"	0:57
3.	"Discovery"	5:05
4.	"Cavern"	3:11
5.	"Intruder 1"	2:04
6.	"Encounter"	2:20
7.	"Intruder 2"	1:55
8.	"Warhead Storage"	3:39
9.	"Intruder 3"	2:55
10.	"Mantis Hymn"	2:56
11.	"Hind D"	1:58
12.	"Duel"	2:22
13.	"Enclosure"	2:14
14.	"Blast Furnace"	2:58
15.	"Colosseo"	1:53
16.	"REX's Lair"	3:05
17.	"Escape"	3:11
18.	"End Title / The Best Is Yet to Come"	5:46
19.	"VR Training"	2:37
20.	"Metal Gear Solid Main Theme" (1997 E3 edit)	5:23
21.	"Metal Gear Solid Control Mix" (mixed by Quadra)	6:53

==== "The Best Is Yet to Come" ====
"The Best Is Yet to Come" was written in Japanese by Rika Muranaka and translated into Irish by Bláthnaid Ní Chofaigh. The song was recorded at Beech Park Studio, Ireland, engineered by Philip Begley and produced by Muranaka.

==== Personnel ====
===== Musicians =====
- Aoife Ní Fhearraigh – lead vocals
- Declan Masterson – low pipe, bouzouki
- James Blennerhassett – double bass
- John Fitzpatrick – fiddle
- Noel Bridgeman – percussion
- Rika Muranaka – keyboards, production

===== Additional personnel =====
- Philip Begley – engineering
- David Downes – additional choral arrangement

===== Chorus vocalists =====
- Iarlaith Carter
- Stephen Mailey
- Eimear Noone
- Meav Ní Mhaolchatha
- John Mc Namara
- Cathal Clinch
- Rachel Talbot
- Sinead Fay
- Sylvia O'Brieniarlaith Carter
- Ewan Cowley

=== Metal Gear >> Solid Snake: Music Compilation of Hideo Kojima / Red Disc ===
Metal Gear / Solid Snake: Music Compilation of Hideo Kojima / Red Disc

Soundtrack album by Metal Gear Solid Series
- Released: December 23, 1998
- Genres: Ambient, Electronic, Chiptune, Downtempo, Rock, Techno, Trance, Video game soundtrack
- Length: 72:22
- Label: King Records

Metal Gear >> Solid Snake: Music Compilation of Hideo Kojima / Red Disc (Japanese: 小島秀夫監督作品 音楽集 赤盤, Hepburn: Kojima Hideo Kantoku Sakuhin Ongakushu: Akaban; commonly shortened to Kojima Red) is a soundtrack album featuring remixed music based on the MSX2 video games Metal Gear and Metal Gear 2: Solid Snake. Red Disc consists almost entirely of newly-remixed tracks, including two original tracks, plus three tracks recycled from the Metal Gear 2: Solid Snake original soundtrack album. The composers for Red Disc include Hikaru Nanase, Kanichiroo Kubo, Konami Kukeiha Club, Motoaki Furukawa and Yoshiyuki Itoo.

It serves as a companion album to the previously released Snatcher >> Policenauts: Music Compilation of Hideo Kojima / Black Disc (小島秀夫監督作品 音楽集 黒盤, Kojima Hideo Kantoku Sakuhin Ongakushu: Kuroban; commonly shortened to Kojima Black), an album which features a similar mix of newly-recorded and previously released music tracks based on Kojima's two adventure games, Snatcher and Policenauts.

Metal Gear / Solid Snake: Music compilation of Hideo Kojima / Red Disc (disc 1)
No.	Title	Length
1.	"Theme of Solid Snake"	3:02
2.	"Theme of Tara"	5:28
3.	"The Front Line"	2:32
4.	"Frequency 140.84"	3:20
5.	"Sneaking Mission"	5:32
6.	"Level 3 Warning"	3:12
7.	"Return to Dust"	3:26
8.	"Chasing the Green Beret"	3:16
9.	"Imminent"	2:00
10.	"An Advance"	1:43
11.	"Advance Immediately"	2:10
12.	"Night Fall"	3:18
13.	"Level 1 Warning"	2:53
14.	"Red Alert"	5:12
15.	"Infiltration"	3:23
16.	"Farewell"	1:52
17.	"Return of Fox Hounder"	5:18
18.	"Red Sun"	3:19
19.	"Exit"	5:07
20.	"Heavy Metal Gear"	5:06

=== Metal Gear Solid 2: Sons of Liberty Original Soundtrack ===
Metal Gear Solid 2: Sons of Liberty Original Soundtrack

Soundtrack album to Metal Gear Solid 2: Sons of Liberty
- Released: November 29, 2001
- Genres: Ambient, classical, drum and bass, electronic, jazz
- Length: 45:49
- Label: King
- Producer: Konami

Metal Gear Solid 2: Sons of Liberty Original Soundtrack is the official soundtrack to Konami's 2001 stealth game Metal Gear Solid 2: Sons of Liberty.

Most of the original music was composed and arranged by Harry Gregson-Williams, with the exceptions of "Metal Gear Solid Main Theme", composed by Tappi Iwase and arranged by Harry Gregson-Williams, "Can't Say Goodbye to Yesterday", written by Rika Muranaka and performed by the Felix Farrar Orchestra and (in the full version) Carla White, and "Fortune" and "Who Am I Really?", composed by Norihiko Hibino. "Opening Infiltration", "RAY Escapes", "The World Needs Only One Big Boss!" and "Arsenal Is Going to Take Off!" were co-composed by Gregson-Williams and Hibino.

The CD was released on November 29, 2001 – the same day as the Japanese release of the game. A second soundtrack to Sons of Liberty, Metal Gear Solid 2: Sons of Liberty Soundtrack 2: The Other Side, was released in 2002.

Metal Gear Solid 2: Sons of Liberty original soundtrack (disc 1)
No.	Title	Writer(s)	Length
1.	"Metal Gear Solid Main Theme" (Harry Gregson-Williams)	Tappi Iwase, Harry Gregson-Williams	3:52
2.	"Opening Infiltration"	Harry Gregson-Williams, Norihiko Hibino	3:44
3.	"Russian Soldiers from Kasatka"	Harry Gregson-Williams	2:22
4.	"Olga Gurlukovich"	Harry Gregson-Williams	2:11
5.	"Metal Gear?"	Harry Gregson-Williams	1:46
6.	"Revolver Ocelot"	Harry Gregson-Williams	2:10
7.	"RAY Escapes"	Harry Gregson-Williams, Norihiko Hibino	2:53
8.	"Can't Say Goodbye to Yesterday" (piano version performed by the Felix Farrar Orchestra)	Rika Muranaka	4:10
9.	"Big Shell"	Harry Gregson-Williams	2:09
10.	"Fortune"	Norihiko Hibino	3:10
11.	"Kill Me Now!"	Harry Gregson-Williams	1:04
12.	"Vamp"	Harry Gregson-Williams	1:32
13.	"The World Needs Only One Big Boss!"	Harry Gregson-Williams, Norihiko Hibino	1:49
14.	"It's the Harrier!"	Harry Gregson-Williams	1:03
15.	"Arsenal Is Going to Take Off!"	Harry Gregson-Williams, Norihiko Hibino	1:40
16.	"Who Am I Really?"	Norihiko Hibino	2:38
17.	"Can't Say Goodbye to Yesterday" (full version performed by Carla White)	Rika Muranaka	7:36

=== Metal Gear Solid 2: Sons of Liberty Soundtrack 2: The Other Side ===
Metal Gear Solid 2: Sons of Liberty Soundtrack 2: The Other Side

Soundtrack album to Metal Gear Solid 2: Sons of Liberty
- Released: January 26, 2002
- Genres: Ambient, breakbeat, classical, drum and bass, electronic, video game music
- Length: 57:35
- Label: King
- Producer: Konami

Metal Gear Solid 2: Sons of Liberty Soundtrack 2: Other Side is the second official soundtrack to Konami's 2001 stealth game Metal Gear Solid 2: Sons of Liberty. All of the original music was composed by Norihiko Hibino. The CD was released on January 26, 2002 – two months after the Japanese release of the game.

Metal Gear Solid 2: Sons of Liberty Soundtrack 2: The Other Side (disc 1)
No.	Title	Length
1.	"Tanker Incident"	9:27
2.	"The Elevator Up to Hell"	0:50
3.	"Vamp's Dance"	5:39
4.	"Infiltration"	2:00
5.	"Battle"	2:28
6.	"Peter's Theme"	1:43
7.	"Countdown to Disaster"	1:46
8.	"Lady Luck Revisited"	1:35
9.	"Yell "Dead Cell""	2:01
10.	"Metal Gear's Already Active!"	3:05
11.	"Arms Depot"	2:00
12.	"Memories of Hal"	2:34
13.	"Twilight Sniping"	2:31
14.	"Will the Virus Still Work?"	2:51
15.	"Comradeship"	2:56
16.	"Reminiscence"	2:21
17.	"Arsenal's Guts"	2:52
18.	"Prelude to the Denouement"	3:12
19.	"Father and Son"	2:27
20.	"Freedom to Decide"	3:20
Total length:		57:35

=== Metal Gear Solid 2: Substance Original Soundtrack Ultimate Sorter Edition ===
Metal Gear Solid 2: Substance Original Soundtrack Ultimate Sorter Edition

Soundtrack album by Metal Gear Solid Series
- Released: December 19, 2002
- Genre: Video game soundtrack
- Length: 54:22

Metal Gear Solid 2: Substance Original Soundtrack Ultimate Sorter Edition is a soundtrack included with special edition sorter for Metal Gear Solid 2: Substance. All tracks are composed by Harry Gregson-Williams & Norihiko Hibino.

==== Track listing ====
No.	Title	Length
1.	"Can't Say Goodbye to Yesterday (complete mix)"	7:40
2.	"Opening Infiltration A (Harry's original mix)"	3:04
3.	"Opening Infiltration B (Harry's original mix)"	1:15
4.	"Revolver Ocelot (Harry's original mix)"	2:03
5.	"Arsenal Is Going to Take Off! A (Harry's original mix)"	2:12
6.	"Arsenal Is Going to Take Off! B (Harry's original mix)"	0:52
7.	"The World Needs Only One Big Boss! (Harry's original mix)"	0:49
8.	"Yell "Dead Cell" (VR remix)"	2:25
9.	"VR "Remixed" Weapon Mission"	5:29
10.	"VR "Remixed" Sneaking Mission"	2:40
11.	"VR "Remixed" Variety Mission"	2:30
12.	"Tanker Incident (alternate remix)"	3:13
13.	"Electronica Emma"	4:01
14.	"Next Generation (Part 1)"	1:31
15.	"Next Generation (Part 2)"	2:09
16.	""Metal Gear Solid" Main Theme (document remix)"	2:15
17.	"Can't Say Goodbye to Yesterday (piano remix)"	6:17
18.	""Metal Gear Solid" Main Theme"	3:50

=== Metal Gear Solid 2: Substance Limited Soundtrack Ultimate Sorter Edition ===
Metal Gear Solid 2: Substance Limited Sorter (black edition)

Soundtrack album by Metal Gear Solid Series
- Released: December 19, 2002
- Genre: Video game soundtrack
- Length: 32:47

Metal Gear Solid 2: Substance Limited Soundtrack Ultimate Sorter Edition is a soundtrack that came packaged with a special edition sorter of Metal Gear Solid 2: Substance. Music is composed by: Norihiko Hibino & TAPPY.

==== Track listing ====
No.	Title	Length
1.	""Metal Gear Solid" main theme (document remix)"	2:14
2.	"Snake in VR Mission – Weapon"	1:57
3.	"Snake in VR Mission – Sneaking"	2:13
4.	"Raiden in VR Mission – Weapon"	2:29
5.	"Raiden in VR Mission – Sneaking"	2:31
6.	"VR Variety Mission"	1:59
7.	"Vs. Genola"	2:02
8.	"Tuxedo Snake"	1:58
9.	"Mission in the Dark – Sneaking"	1:44
10.	"Mission in the Dark – Action"	3:10
11.	"Alternate Mission – Photo Shoot"	2:14
12.	"MGS1 Snake in VR – Weapon"	1:56
13.	"MGS1 Snake in VR – Sneaking"	2:49
14.	""Metal Gear Solid" main theme (skateboarding remix)"	3:20

=== Metal Gear Solid 3: Snake Eater Original Soundtrack ===
Metal Gear Solid 3: Snake Eater Original Soundtrack

Soundtrack album by Metal Gear Solid Series
- Released: December 17, 2004
- Recorded: Unknown
- Genres: Ambient, Breakbeat, Classical, Electronic, Lounge, Rock, Rock and roll, Video game soundtrack
- Length: 71:45 (Disc one); 70:13 (Disc two)
- Label: Phantom (Japan)
- Producer: Konami

Metal Gear Solid 3: Snake Eater Original Soundtrack is the official soundtrack album of Konami's PlayStation 2 video game Metal Gear Solid 3: Snake Eater and was released by Japanese music label, Phantom, on December 17, 2004 under the catalog number KOLA-089/090. The soundtrack consists of two discs and features music from various artists and composers such as Harry Gregson-Williams, Norihiko Hibino, Cynthia Harrell, TAPPY, and Starsailor. The soundtrack also included a "Special Camouflage Key Disc" which allowed players who owned a copy of Metal Gear Solid 3: Snake Eater for the PlayStation 2 to obtain additional camouflage uniforms for Naked Snake by selecting "Special Camouflage Key" under the menu titled "Special" once it's prompted to appear in the game.

==== Track listing ====
Special camouflage key disc.

Metal Gear Solid 3: Snake Eater Original Soundtrack Disc 1
No.	Title	Artist(s)	Length
1.	"Snake Eater (Cynthia Harrell)"	Music & words by Norihiko Hibino; Vocal by Cynthia Harrell	2:58
2.	""METAL GEAR SOLID" Main Theme (METAL GEAR SOLID 3 version)"	Original music by TAPPY; Arranged by Harry Gregson-Williams	6:32
3.	"CQC"	Harry Gregson-Williams	2:28
4.	"Virtuous Mission"	Harry Gregson-Williams	6:08
5.	"On The Ground ~ Battle in the Jungle"	Norihiko Hibino	3:54
6.	"KGBVSGRU"	Harry Gregson-Williams	3:48
7.	"Shagohod"	Harry Gregson-Williams	3:47
8.	"Operation Snake Eater"	Norihiko Hibino	1:14
9.	"Mission Briefing"	Harry Gregson-Williams	3:10
10.	"Across The Border ~ Snake Meets The Boss"	Harry Gregson-Williams	3:11
11.	"Eva's Unveiling"	Nobuko Toda & Norihiko Hibino	1:50
12.	"Ocelot Youth ~ Confrontation"	Harry Gregson-Williams & Norihiko Hibino	3:12
13.	"The Cobras in the Jungle"	Harry Gregson-Williams	3:26
14.	"The Pain"	Norihiko Hibino	1:50
15.	"The Fear"	Norihiko Hibino	2:11
16.	"Fortress Sneaking"	Harry Gregson-Williams	2:13
17.	"Underground Tunnel"	Harry Gregson-Williams	2:53
18.	"The Fury"	Norihiko Hibino	2:25
19.	"Surfing Guitar (66 Boys)" (Healing Tracks)	66 Boys	3:07
20.	"Sailor (Starry.K)"	Starry.K	3:32
21.	"Salty Catfish (66 Boys)"	66 Boys	3:27
22.	"Old Metal Gear (Starry.K)"	Starry.K	4:29

Metal Gear Solid 3: Snake Eater Original Soundtrack Disc 2
No.	Title	Artist(s)	Length
1.	"Battle in the Base"	Norihiko Hibino	4:18
2.	"Volgin, The Torturer"	Harry Gregson-Williams & Norihiko Hibino	2:18
3.	"The Sorrow ~ Everlasting Fight"	Harry Gregson-Williams & Shuichi Kobori	3:51
4.	"Clash With Evil Personified"	Norihiko Hibino	1:52
5.	"Sidecar – Escape From The Fortress –"	Harry Gregson-Williams	2:07
6.	"Sidecar – On The Rail Bridge –"	Harry Gregson-Williams	2:20
7.	"Takin' On The Shagohod"	Norihiko Hibino	2:03
8.	"Escape Through The Woods"	Norihiko Hibino	3:37
9.	"Troops in Gathering"	Harry Gregson-Williams	1:56
10.	"Life's End"	Harry Gregson-Williams	1:48
11.	"Last Showdown"	Norihiko Hibino	3:12
12.	"The Return of the MiGs"	Norihiko Hibino	1:51
13.	"Don't Be Afraid (Elisa Fiorillo)"	Music & words by Rika Muranaka; Vocal by Elisa Fiorillo	5:42
14.	"Eva's Reminiscence"	Norihiko Hibino	4:53
15.	"Debriefing"	Harry Gregson-Williams	7:21
16.	"Way To Fall (Starsailor)"	Words & music by James Walsh / James Stelfox / Ben Byrne / Barry Westhead; Performed by Starsailor	4:31
17.	"Rock Me Baby (66 Boys)" (Healing Tracks)	66 Boys	2:29
18.	"Pillow Talk (Starry.K)"	Starry.K	5:19
19.	"Jumpin' Johnny (Chunk Raspberry)"	Chunk Raspberry	3:28
20.	"Sea Breeze (Sergei Mantis)"	Sergei Mantis	3:43
21.	"Snake vs Monkey (Extra track)"	Kobo	1:34

==== Soundtrack credits ====
- Executive Soundtrack Director – Hideo Kojima
- Music Supervisor – Kazuki Muraoka
- Mastered by Chiaki Ikematsu
- Art Director and Designer – Ichiro Kutome
- Illustration – Yoji Shinkawa
- Producer – Yuichi Hashimoto
- Co-Producer – Kazuki Aoki
- Executive Producer – Akihiko Nagata

==== Notes ====
- "Underground Tunnel" uses a sample from the Phone Booth soundtrack
- "Debriefing" uses a sample from the "Man on Fire" soundtrack.
- "Healing Tracks" are actually written by Norihiko Hibino, who selected song titles and artist names as a parody of the music in the '60s.
- "Snake Eater" sans the vocals and "Battle in the Base" appear in Super Smash Bros. Brawl for the Wii. Both of these tracks can be used alongside other classic Metal Gear Solid tracks as the background music for Solid Snake's Stage, "Shadow Moses Island".

=== Metal Gear Solid 3: Snake Eater – The First Bite ===
Metal Gear Solid 3: Snake Eater – The First Bite

Soundtrack album by Metal Gear Solid Series
- Released: November 1, 2004
- Genres: Breakbeat, Classical, Drum and bass, Electronic, Hip hop, Jazz, Lounge, Video game soundtrack

Metal Gear Solid 3: Snake Eater – The First Bite is a CD that was only released in Japan in November 2004. The CD includes promotional materials, such as songs, screensaver and a Snake Eater music video. Music is composed by Norihiko Hibino.

Metal Gear Solid 3: Snake Eater – The First Bite (disc 1)
No.	Title	Writer(s)	Performed by	Length
1.	"Snake Eater (Abstracted Camouflage)"	Norihiko Hibino	Cynthia Harrell	6:32
2.	"Infiltration into the Jungle"	Norihiko Hibino		4:13
3.	"Escape"	Norihiko Hibino		1:59
4.	"Chivalry"	Norihiko Hibino		3:20
5.	"The Treading Behemoth"	Norihiko Hibino		2:07
6.	"Snake Eater (Japanese Version)"	Norihiko Hibino	W.A	5:00

=== Metal Gear Acid 1 and 2 Original Soundtrack ===
Metal Gear Acid 1 & 2 Original soundtrack

Soundtrack album by Metal Gear Solid Series
- Released: December 21, 2005
- Genre: Video Game Soundtrack
- Length: 58:45 (disc 1); 67:50 (disc 2)
- Label: Sony Music
- Producers: Masahiro Hinami (disc 1); Noriaki Okamura (disc 2)

Metal Gear Acid 1 & 2 Original Soundtrack is a double CD album released on December 21, 2005. The first disc includes music from Metal Gear Acid, composed by Akihiro Honda, Nobuko Toda and Shuichi Kobori. The second disc contains music from Metal Gear Acid 2, and is composed by Akihiro Honda, Hiroshi Tanabe, Nobuko Toda and Shuichi Kobori. The album comes with an 18-page booklet featuring track listings and artwork by Hiroshi Banno and Junko Kolke.

==== Track listing ====
Disc one (58:45)
No.	Title	Length
1.	"Metal Gear Acid"	0:52
2.	"Intermission"	0:57
3.	"Conspiracy"	1:49
4.	"Nekal Commercial"	0:07
5.	"On Alert"	0:59
6.	"Leone"	1:36
7.	"Briefing"	1:06
8.	"Elsie & Francis"	1:37
9.	"First Mission"	1:23
10.	"Undercover Action"	1:39
11.	"Control Office"	1:29
12.	"Egersis"	1:55
13.	"Minette"	1:07
14.	"Dream Land"	1:46
15.	"BRC"	1:29
16.	"Ritual of the Swarm"	1:32
17.	"Leone Forces"	1:37
18.	"Residential Quarters"	1:25
19.	"Power House"	1:51
20.	"Interval of Dark"	1:45
21.	"Niko2"	1:37
22.	"FAR"	1:29
23.	"La Clown"	1:53
24.	"Death of Swallowtail"	1:10
25.	"Frisson"	1:38
26.	"Metal Gear !?"	1:29
27.	"Vs. Metal Gear"	3:38
28.	"Alice"	1:33
29.	"Roger's Congession"	1:59
30.	"End Title"	3:42
31.	"MGS1 Pack"	0:23
32.	"MGS2 Pack"	0:29
33.	"MGS3 Pack"	0:34
34.	"Chronicle Pack"	0:32
35.	"Link Battle"	1:48
36.	"Link Battle Rush"	0:43
37.	"Sweeties"	0:40
38.	"Mission Start"	0:07
39.	"Mission Failed"	0:07
40.	"Mission Complete"	0:07
41.	"Metal Gear (Remix)"	2:00
42.	"Sound Effects (Bonus Track)"	3:03

Disc 2 (67:50)
No.	Title	Length
1.	"Metal Gear Acid 2"	1:23
2.	"Intermission"	1:05
3.	"VR Training"	1:34
4.	"Flight"	1:44
5.	"Touch & Go"	1:21
6.	"Willing to Hear Me Out Now?"	2:05
7.	"Opening Title"	1:30
8.	"StrateLogic Inc."	1:31
9.	"Control Section"	1:33
10.	"B.B."	1:15
11.	"Research Block"	2:04
12.	"Single Action"	0:59
13.	"Takiyama & Lucy"	1:38
14.	"Security Unit"	1:16
15.	"Test Subject Awakens"	0:41
16.	"Test Subject Burns"	1:54
17.	"Venus"	1:45
18.	"Playtime"	1:42
19.	"Seeking Takiyama"	1:17
20.	"The Essence of Vince"	1:51
21.	"Track Tracking"	1:20
22.	"Locomotive Motion"	1:00
23.	"Revenge of Koppelthorn"	1:21
24.	"Destruction"	1:29
25.	"Residential Area"	1:34
26.	"Memories"	1:19
27.	"Back-to-Back"	1:35
28.	"Metal Gear Prototype Factory"	1:31
29.	"Resurrection"	1:43
30.	"???"	1:35
31.	"Farewell, Vince"	1:50
32.	"Like a Flood"	1:35
33.	"Chaioth Ha Qadesh"	1:58
34.	"We Can Become One"	1:45
35.	"Lucy & Chaioth Ha Qadesh"	2:09
36.	"Hypocrisy"	0:53
37.	"Test Subjects Duality"	2:18
38.	"The Great Escape"	1:29
39.	"End Title"	4:19
40.	"See That, Snake?"	1:33
41.	"My Love"	1:08
42.	"Information Fanfare"	0:06
43.	"Opening Title (Remix)"	2:09

=== Metal Gear Solid: Portable Ops Original Soundtrack ===
Metal Gear Solid: Portable Ops Original Soundtrack

Soundtrack album by Metal Gear Solid Series
- Released: December 20, 2006
- Genres: Ambient, breakbeat, classical, drum and bass, electronic, video game soundtrack
- Length: 73:35
- Label: Sony Music
- Producer: Sotaro Tojima

Metal Gear Solid: Portable Ops Original Soundtrack is the official soundtrack for Metal Gear Solid: Portable Ops, released for Sony's PlayStation Portable. The soundtrack contains 44 tracks composed by: Akihiro Honda, Kazuma Jinnouchi, Nobuko Toda, Takahiro Izutani, Norihiko Hibino & Yoshitaka Suzuki. The soundtrack was released on December 20, 2006.

==== Track listing ====
Metal Gear Solid: Portable Ops Original Soundtrack
No.	Title	Performed by	Length
1.	"Calling to the Night (vocals by Natasha Farrow)"	Natasha Farrow	3:14
2.	"Opening Title"		1:09
3.	"Imprisonment"		2:33
4.	"COMM Base"		0:56
5.	"Intermission"		2:05
6.	"To Arms"		1:04
7.	"Soviet Patrol Base"		1:14
8.	"Research Lab"		1:05
9.	"Diversionary Ops"		0:44
10.	"Town"		1:06
11.	"Dynamite"		1:02
12.	"In the Wilderness"		1:11
13.	"Place of Prophecy"		1:13
14.	"Nukes"		1:00
15.	"Warheads Storage Facility"		1:16
16.	"Python"		1:57
17.	"Sad Man's Theme"		1:43
18.	"The Hunt"		0:53
19.	"Airport"		1:18
20.	"Null"		1:41
21.	"Hot War"		3:13
22.	"Rescue Effort"		1:18
23.	"Evasion"		1:47
24.	"Elisa"		1:50
25.	"Destiny's Call"		0:57
26.	"Before Dawn"		3:00
27.	"RAXA"		2:14
28.	"Substation"		1:11
29.	"Break for the Fortress"		1:00
30.	"The Frank Hunter"		2:22
31.	"Null's Revenge"		1:51
32.	"Silo"		1:08
33.	"Fortress"		1:02
34.	"Revelation"		3:03
35.	"Cunningham"		2:09
36.	"Gene"		2:17
37.	"ICBMG"		2:41
38.	"The Legacy"		1:55
39.	"Comradery"		2:05
40.	"Show Time (bonus track)"		3:03
41.	"Mission: Failed (bonus track)"		0:14
42.	"Mission: Complete (bonus track)"		0:10
43.	"Match (bonus track)"		1:37
44.	"SE Collection (bonus track)"		2:59

==== Notes ====
- "Sad Man's Theme" contains the same trumpet from "Peter's Theme" which is featured on Metal Gear Solid 2: Sons of Liberty Soundtrack 2: The Other Side. The trumpet is done by Kenichi Ishii.
- "Evasion" is a remix of "Countdown to Disaster", which is composed by Norihiko Hibino, and is featured on Metal Gear Solid 2: Sons Of Liberty Soundtrack 2: The Other Side.
- "The Legacy" uses a sample of "Ocelot Youth", which is composed by Norihiko Hibino and appears on Metal Gear Solid 3: Snake Eater Original Soundtrack.
- In the booklet, "Substation" (track #28) isn't credited to anyone.
- "Calling to the Night" is featured in Super Smash Bros. Brawl as a song for the Shadow Moses Island stage, Metal Gear Solid 4: Guns of the Patriots as an iPod track and Metal Gear Solid: Peace Walker, which can be played on a "Walkman".

=== Metal Gear 20th Anniversary: Metal Gear Music Collection ===
Metal Gear 20th Anniversary: Metal Gear Music Collection

Compilation album by the Metal Gear series
- Released: July 18, 2007
- Genre: Video game music
- Length: 64:53
- Label: Konami Digital Entertainment
- Producer: Norihiko Hibino

Metal Gear 20th Anniversary: Metal Gear Music Collection is a compilation album released for the video game series Metal Gear on July 18, 2007. The album contains songs from various games in the series, as well as a new song titled "Metal Gear 20 Years History — Past, Present, Future —", a medley spanning the whole series. The album was produced by Norihiko Hibino, who also composed three of the album's songs and co-arranged two tracks.

Metal Gear 20th Anniversary: Metal Gear Music Collection (disc 1)
No.	Title	Writer(s)	Length
1.	"Metal Gear 20 Years History – Past, Present, Future —" (instrumental)	various composers	14:25
2.	"Snake Eater"	Norihiko Hibino	2:57
3.	"Virtuous Mission" (instrumental)	Harry Gregson-Williams	6:06
4.	"Yell "Dead Cell"" (VR remix; instrumental)	Hibino	2:27
5.	"Who Am I Really? — Memories of Hal – Reminiscence" (instrumental)	Hibino	8:00
6.	"Metal Gear Solid Main Theme – The World Needs Only One Big Boss!" (instrumental)	TAPPY, Harry Gregson-Williams	5:47
7.	"Can't Say Goodbye to Yesterday"	Rika Muranaka	7:37
8.	"Zanzibar Breeze" (instrumental)	Mutsuhiko Izumi	5:37
9.	"Calling to the Night"	Akihiro Honda (music), Nobuko Toda (lyrics)	3:16
10.	"The Best Is Yet to Come"	Muranaka	5:53
11.	"Calling to the Night" (piano version; instrumental)	Honda	2:48

==== Game references ====
- Tracks 1 and 11 previously unreleased
- Tracks 2 and 3 from Metal Gear Solid 3: Snake Eater
- Track 4 from Metal Gear Solid 2: Substance
- Tracks 5 and 7 from Metal Gear Solid 2: Sons of Liberty
- Track 6 taken from Metal Gear Solid 3: Snake Eater and Metal Gear Solid 2: Sons of Liberty
- Track 8 from Metal Gear 2: Solid Snake
- Track 9 from Metal Gear Solid: Portable Ops
- Track 10 from Metal Gear Solid

==== Personnel ====
===== Performers =====
- Cynthia Harrell – vocals on "Snake Eater"
- Carla White – vocals on "Can't Say Goodbye to Yesterday"
- Natasha Farrow – vocals on "Calling to the Night"
- Aoife Ní Fhearraigh – vocals on "The Best Is Yet to Come"

===== Music =====
- Norihiko Hibino – production, arrangements on tracks 1 and 5
- Yojiro Kudo – executive production
- Hideo Kojima – executive production
- Takahide Ayuzawa – arrangements on tracks 1 and 8
- Shinya Kiyozuka – arrangements on tracks 5 and 11
- Mutsuhiko Izumi – arrangements on track 8
- Yukie Fuse – mastering
- Kazuki Muraoka – supervision

===== Artwork =====
- Ichiro Kutome – direction, design
- Hiroshi Banno – coordination
- Akira Kato – photography
- Yoji Shinkawa – illustrations

=== Metal Gear Solid 4: Guns of the Patriots Original Soundtrack ===
Metal Gear Solid 4: Guns of the Patriots Original Soundtrack

Soundtrack album
- Released: May 28, 2008
- Genres: Acoustic, ambient, breakbeat, classical, electronic, rock
- Length: 139:38
- Label: Sony Music
- Producer: Sotaro Tojima

Professional ratings
Review scores
Source	Rating
IGN	(7.7/10)

Metal Gear Solid 4: Guns of the Patriots Original Soundtrack is the soundtrack to the video game of the same name, composed primarily by Nobuko Toda, Shuichi Kobori, Kazuma Jinnouchi, and Harry Gregson-Williams. The official soundtrack was released on May 28, 2008 by Konami Digital Entertainment under the catalog number GFCA-98/9. A soundtrack album was also packaged with Metal Gear Solid 4: Guns of the Patriots Limited Edition, but featured fewer songs.

While only fifteen minutes of music from the GEM Impact team (Yoshitaka Suzuki, Takahiro Izutani, and Norihiko Hibino) was featured on the official soundtrack, Norihiko Hibino later confirmed in an interview that the team in fact provided close to 90 minutes of music for the game's cutscenes.

The album packaged with the Limited Edition release of Metal Gear Solid 4: Guns of the Patriots is not the complete soundtrack. It possesses only track numbers 1–3, 5, 9–11, 13, 16, and 19 of CD1 and numbers 1, 10, 12, and 15–17 of CD2 (all of which are songs written by Harry Gregson-Williams), with none of the in-game tracks.

==== Track listing ====
===== CD 1 =====
Metal Gear Solid 4: Guns of the Patriots Original Soundtrack – CD 1
No.	Title	Artist(s)	Length
1.	"Old Snake"	Harry Gregson-Williams	3:52
2.	"Love Theme"	Music orchestrated by Nobuko Toda; Words by Hideo Kojima; Performed by Jackie Presti	7:07
3.	"Gekko"	Harry Gregson-Williams	2:53
4.	"Haven Troopers"	Nobuko Toda, Shuichi Kobori, Kazuma Jinnouchi	3:40
5.	"BB Corps"	Harry Gregson-Williams	3:43
6.	"Drebin 893"	Nobuko Toda, Shuichi Kobori, Kazuma Jinnouchi	3:29
7.	"Vista Mansion"	Nobuko Toda, Shuichi Kobori, Kazuma Jinnouchi	1:32
8.	"Laughing Octopus"	Nobuko Toda, Shuichi Kobori, Kazuma Jinnouchi	2:19
9.	"Breakthrough"	Harry Gregson-Williams	3:09
10.	"Endless Pain"	Harry Gregson-Williams	2:46
11.	"White Blood"	Harry Gregson-Williams	2:49
12.	"Call Me Hal"	Nobuko Toda, Shuichi Kobori, Kazuma Jinnouchi	3:01
13.	"Midnight Shadow"	Harry Gregson-Williams	2:58
14.	"Paradise Lost"	Nobuko Toda, Shuichi Kobori, Kazuma Jinnouchi	4:13
15.	"Great Escape"	Nobuko Toda, Shuichi Kobori, Kazuma Jinnouchi	2:14
16.	"Desperate Chase"	Harry Gregson-Williams	2:57
17.	"Raging Raven"	Nobuko Toda, Shuichi Kobori, Kazuma Jinnouchi	2:34
18.	"Confrontation"	Yoshitaka Suzuki	3:10
19.	"Mobs Alive"	Harry Gregson-Williams	3:24
20.	"Violent Ceasefire"	Yoshitaka Suzuki	2:08

Metal Gear Solid 4: Guns of the Patriots Original Soundtrack – CD 2
No.	Title	Artist(s)	Length
1.	"Next-Gen Control"	Harry Gregson-Williams	4:40
2.	"Crying Wolf"	Nobuko Toda, Shuichi Kobori, Kazuma Jinnouchi	2:10
3.	"One More Reboot"	Nobuko Toda, Shuichi Kobori, Kazuma Jinnouchi	1:41
4.	"Sin"	Nobuko Toda, Shuichi Kobori, Kazuma Jinnouchi	1:44
5.	"Atonement"	Nobuko Toda, Shuichi Kobori, Kazuma Jinnouchi	4:48
6.	"Infinite Loop"	Nobuko Toda, Shuichi Kobori, Kazuma Jinnouchi	3:35
7.	"Everything Ends"	Norihiko Hibino, Takahiro Izutani	2:30
8.	"At Dawn"	Yoshitaka Suzuki	3:30
9.	"Screaming Mantis"	Nobuko Toda, Shuichi Kobori, Akihiro Honda	2:38
10.	"Guns of the Patriots"	Harry Gregson-Williams	4:05
11.	"No Place to Hide"	Nobuko Toda, Shuichi Kobori, Kazuma Jinnouchi	2:36
12.	"Sorrow"	Harry Gregson-Williams	3:50
13.	"Full Circle"	Takahiro Izutani	1:38
14.	"Everything Begins"	Nobuko Toda, Shuichi Kobori, Kazuma Jinnouchi, Yoshitaka Suzuki	4:25
15.	"Father & Son"	Harry Gregson-Williams	2:29
16.	"Metal Gear Saga"	Harry Gregson-Williams	4:19
17.	"Here's to You"	Ennio Morricone (from the film 'Sacco e Vanzetti'); Arranged by Harry Gregson-Williams; Performed by Lisbeth Scott	5:48
18.	"War Zone" (BONUS: In-Game Battle Tracks)	Nobuko Toda, Shuichi Kobori, Kazuma Jinnouchi	1:28
19.	"A Rebellion Rests"	Nobuko Toda, Shuichi Kobori, Kazuma Jinnouchi	2:44
20.	"The Hunter"	Nobuko Toda, Kazuma Jinnouchi, Sōta Fujimori	2:05
21.	"The Hunted"	Nobuko Toda, Shuichi Kobori, Kazuma Jinnouchi	2:00
22.	"Forced Hand"	Nobuko Toda, Shuichi Kobori, Kazuma Jinnouchi	2:08
23.	"Under Curfew"	Nobuko Toda, Shuichi Kobori, Kazuma Jinnouchi	1:49
24.	"Unmanned Army"	Nobuko Toda, Shuichi Kobori, Kazuma Jinnouchi	1:28
25.	"Cold Memories"	Nobuko Toda, Shuichi Kobori, Kazuma Jinnouchi	1:35
26.	"For Liberty"	Nobuko Toda, Shuichi Kobori, Kazuma Jinnouchi	1:58
27.	"Surrounded"	Nobuko Toda, Kazuma Jinnouchi, Sōta Fujimori	1:59

=== Metal Gear Solid: Peace Walker Original Soundtrack ===
Metal Gear Solid: Peace Walker Original Soundtrack

Soundtrack album
- Released: April 14, 2010
- Genres: Acoustic, Ambient, Breakbeat, Classical, Electronic, Latin American music, Video game music
- Length: 72:10
- Label: Konami Digital Entertainment
- Producer: Konami

Singles from Metal Gear Solid: Peace Walker
- 1. "Heavens Divide / Koi no Yokushiryoku" Released: April 7, 2010

Metal Gear Solid: Peace Walker Original Soundtrack is the official soundtrack album of Konami's PlayStation Portable video game Metal Gear Solid: Peace Walker, primarily composed by Kojima Productions' Kazuma Jinnouchi and Nobuko Toda, while Akihiro Honda provides the orchestral theme and the theme songs, "Heavens Divide" (performed in English by Donna Burke) and "Koi no Yokushiryoku (Love Deterrence)" (performed in Japanese by Nana Mizuki). GEM Impact's Norihiko Hibino, Yoshitaka Suzuki and Takahiro Izutani as well as Soundelux Design Music Group's Todd Haberman and Jeremy Soule also provide compositions to the soundtrack.

The game also features music from other Metal Gear games, such as Portable Ops's "Calling to The Night", which can be played in the game's Walkman. The Carpenters ballad "Sing" is sung by Cindy Asada on a taped recording and by the Boss AI as Peace Walker sinks under Lago Cocibolca.

No.	Title	Artist	Length
1.	""Metal Gear Solid: Peace Walker Main Theme""	Akihiro Honda	2:56
2.	""Heavens Divide""	Akihiro Honda; Vocals by Donna Burke	5:14
3.	""Rain of Bane""	Nobuko Toda	1:25
4.	""Marshland""	Akihiro Honda	1:41
5.	""Clients""	Kazuma Jinnouchi	2:11
6.	""Heavy Arms""	Kazuma Jinnouchi	2:03
7.	""The Spear""	Kazuma Jinnouchi	1:36
8.	""Fearless""	Kazuma Jinnouchi	1:14
9.	""Tank Corps""	Jeremy Soule	2:18
10.	""Little Brother""	Norihiko Hibino & Nobuko Toda	5:03
11.	""High Land""	Kazuma Jinnouchi	1:38
12.	""Cold Principle""	Kazuma Jinnouchi	3:23
13.	""PUPA""	Nobuko Toda	1:34
14.	""Hide-out""	Kazuma Jinnouchi	2:31
15.	""Air Strike""	Yoshitaka Suzuki	2:33
16.	""Entry Gate""	Nobuko Toda	2:26
17.	""CHRYSALIS""	Kazuma Jinnouchi	2:24
18.	""COCOON""	Kazuma Jinnouchi	2:12
19.	""Mother Base""	Nobuko Toda	1:39
20.	""Dead Ahead""	Kazuma Jinnouchi	2:09
21.	""Facility""	Kazuma Jinnouchi	0:47
22.	""Take Down""	Todd Haberman	1:54
23.	""Boot Sequence""	Takahiro Izutani	1:51
24.	""Peace Walker""	Todd Haberman	3:00
25.	""Outer Heaven""	Kazuma Jinnouchi & Nobuka Toda	4:59
26.	""Uninterrupted Signal""	Nobuko Toda	1:58
27.	""Zero Allies!""	Kazuma Jinnouchi	4:35
28.	""Koi no Yokushiryoku""	Akihiro Honda; Vocals by Nana Mizuki	4:56

=== Metal Gear 25th Anniversary: Metal Gear Music Collection ===
Metal Gear 25th Anniversary: Metal Gear Music Collection

Compilation album
- Released: August 22, 2012
- Genre: Video game
- Length: 69:36
- Label: Konami Digital Entertainment
- Producer: Konami

Metal Gear 25th Anniversary: Metal Gear Music Collection is a compilation album celebrating the 25th anniversary of the Metal Gear franchise, released on August 22, 2012. The album was revealed on KONAMISTYLE, Konami's webstore, and was released on August 22, 2012 (although it was originally targeting a July 25, 2012 release).

It is similar to a previous album, the Metal Gear 20th Anniversary: Metal Gear Music Collection, in that it collects tracks that span the Metal Gear series. The source games used for this soundtrack were Guns of the Patriots, Metal Gear Online and Peace Walker.

Metal Gear 25th Anniversary: Metal Gear Music Collection (disc 1)
No.	Title	Writer(s)	Performed by	Length
1.	"Overture – Metal Gear Saga"	Harry Gregson-Williams		5:15
2.	"Love Theme – 25th Anniversary Ver."	Nobuko Toda (music), Hideo Kojima (lyrics)	Jackie Presti	7:03
3.	"Metal Gear Solid 4: Guns of the Patriots Medley"	Harry Gregson-Williams, Akihiro Honda, Kazuma Jinnouchi & Nobuko Toda	The City of Prague Philharmonic Orchestra	10:25
4.	"Here's to You"	Harry Gregson-Williams, Ennio Morricone	Lisbeth Scott	5:48
5.	"Gem Impact Tracks"	GEM Impact		8:55
6.	"Metal Gear Online Tribute Medley"	Akihiro Honda		7:21
7.	"Metal Gear Solid: Peace Walker Medley"	Harry Gregson-Williams, Akihiro Honda, Kazuma Jinnouchi & Nobuko Toda	The City of Prague Philharmonic Orchestra	9:40
8.	"Heavens Divide"	Akihiro Honda	Donna Burke	5:13
9.	"Alerts & Cautions"	Kazuma Jinnouchi, Akihiro Honda & Nobuko Toda		9:56

=== Metal Gear Rising: Revengeance – Vocal Tracks ===
Metal Gear Rising: Revengeance – Vocal Tracks

Soundtrack album to Metal Gear Rising: Revengeance by Jamie Christopherson
- Released: February 19th 2013
- Genres: Electronic rock, industrial metal, alternative metal, hard rock, Power Metal
- Length: 1:11:16
- Label: Sumthing Else Music Works/Konami Digital Entertainment

Professional ratings
Review scores
Source	Rating
AllMusic	(positive)
Forbes	9/10

Metal Gear Rising: Revengeance – Vocal Tracks is the first official soundtrack used in the video game Metal Gear Rising: Revengeance.

The game's score was composed by Jamie Christopherson, with additional music by Graeme Cornies, Brian Pickett, James Chapple, and David Kelly, and directed by Naoto Tanaka. As a result of the game being focused on action rather than stealth like the previous Metal Gear games, the music has a different style. Director Kenji Saito proposed the idea of heavy and fast music featuring lyrics to Kojima Productions. When the studio accepted Saito's idea, the two developers started working together to make the music. Christopherson also contributed by writing thirteen vocal songs which includes electronic music. The soundtrack features vocals by artists including John Bush, Tyson Yen, Free Dominguez, Jason C. Miller and Jimmy Gnecco with contributions by Logan Mader, former member of Machine Head, Electronic Rock Musicians/Remixers The Maniac Agenda, and Ferry Corsten. A soundtrack featuring themes from the game was featured in the limited edition. Another soundtrack, titled Metal Gear Rising Revengeance Vocal Tracks, featuring 29 tracks, was released on February 20, 2013.

The album was released on CD and vinyl, as well as digital services such as iTunes, Google Play, Spotify and Amazon.

Metal Gear Rising: Revengeance – Vocal Tracks (disc 1)
No.	Title	Length
1.	"Rules of Nature" (platinum mix)	2:30
2.	"The Only Thing I Know For Real" (Maniac Agenda mix)	2:26
3.	"Dark Skies" (platinum mix)	2:21
4.	"I'm My Own Master Now" (platinum mix)	2:10
5.	"A Stranger I Remain" (Maniac Agenda mix)	2:25
6.	"Return to Ashes" (platinum mix)	2:15
7.	"The Stains of Time" (Maniac Agenda mix)	2:10
8.	"Red Sun" (Maniac Agenda mix)	2:13
9.	"A Soul Can't Be Cut" (platinum mix)	2:19
10.	"Collective Consciousness" (Maniac Agenda mix)	2:38
11.	"It Has To Be This Way" (platinum mix)	2:55
12.	"The War Still Rages Within"	5:00
13.	"The Hot Wind Blowing feat. Ferry Corsten" (platinum mix)	2:18
14.	"A Soul Can't Be Cut" (platinum mix – DLC version)	2:19
15.	"Dark Skies" (platinum mix – low key version)	2:17
16.	"Return to Ashes" (platinum mix – low key version)	2:14
17.	"A Soul Can't Be Cut" (platinum mix – low key version)	2:10
18.	"Rules of Nature" (platinum mix – instrumental)	2:30
19.	"The Only Thing I Know For Real" (Maniac Agenda mix – instrumental)	2:26
20.	"Dark Skies" (platinum mix – instrumental)	2:17
21.	"I'm My Own Master Now" (platinum mix – instrumental)	2:10
22.	"A Stranger I Remain" (Maniac Agenda mix – instrumental)	2:25
23.	"Return to Ashes" (platinum mix – instrumental)	2:15
24.	"The Stains of Time" (Maniac Agenda mix – instrumental)	2:10
25.	"Red Sun" (Maniac Agenda mix – instrumental)	2:13
26.	"A Soul Can't Be Cut" (platinum mix – instrumental)	2:19
27.	"Collective Consciousness" (Maniac Agenda mix – instrumental)	2:38
28.	"It Has To Be This Way" (platinum mix – instrumental)	2:55
29.	"The Hot Wind Blowing Feat. Ferry Corsten" (platinum mix – instrumental)	2:18

=== Metal Gear Solid V Original Soundtrack ===
Metal Gear Solid V Original Soundtrack

Soundtrack album by Ludvig Forssell
- Released: September 2, 2015
- Genres: Acoustic, ambient, classical, electronic
- Length: 161:37
- Label: Sony Music
- Producer: Harry Gregson-Williams

Metal Gear Solid V Original Soundtrack is the official soundtrack for the video games Metal Gear Solid V: Ground Zeroes and The Phantom Pain.

==== Development ====
The soundtrack was produced by Harry Gregson-Williams, making it his fourth Metal Gear title. However, unlike previous titles, his involvement during the composing process was minimal, with him ultimately only composing two tracks for Ground Zeroes. In July 2015, Rika Muranaka told Fragged Nation in an interview that over 30 commissioned songs were never used, thus playing part in Konami's budget concerns over the Metal Gear Solid V project.

In an interview with lead composer Ludvig Forssell, it was revealed that there were over eight different versions of Sins of the Father made just for the trailer, on top of the various previous renditions. Forssell himself provided the vocals during development. The song supposedly is a metaphor not only for The Phantom Pain, but the entire Metal Gear Saga: "For this game we have a couple of keywords: race and revenge, and… unfortunately I cannot at this point tell you everything, but there's a lot of metaphors in the lyrics that have to do with the game, and the whole Metal Gear Saga, pretty much." Forssell said.

Recording took place in Los Angeles, Nashville and Santa Barbara.

A second volume of the game's score was released exclusively on iTunes on December 24, 2015, titled "Metal Gear Solid V Extended Soundtrack." The album contains over 5 hours and 45 minutes of previously unreleased music. The extended soundtrack also contains music from "Ground Zeroes".

==== Release ====
The album was released on CD, as well as iTunes and Amazon.com. However, because of licensing issues, the soundtracks' licensed songs are missing from the digital versions. Along with it, a separate album titled Metal Gear Vocal Tracks was released on the same day. It featured the tracks Sins of the Father and Quiet's Theme from The Phantom Pain, as well as various new renditions of tracks from previous games redone in the style of The Phantom Pain. These were done by series veteran Donna Burke.

Metal Gear Solid V original soundtrack (disc 1)
No.	Title	Writer(s)	Performed by	Length
1.	"The Man Who Sold The World"	David Bowie	Midge Ure	5:43
2.	"V Has Come To"	Ludvig Forssell		3:08
3.	"You Can Call Me Ishmael"	Ludvig Forssell		2:03
4.	"A Burning Escape"	Justin Burnett, Ludvig Forssell		9:05
5.	"Afghanistan's a Big Place"	Ludvig Forssell		2:16
6.	"Unforgiving Sands"	Ludvig Forssell		2:47
7.	"Kept You Waiting Huh?"	Ludvig Forssell		3:25
8.	"Parasites"	Ludvig Forssell		3:20
9.	"Allegiance Defined"	Justin Burnett		2:56
10.	"Exfiltrate the Hotzone"	Ludvig Forssell		1:30
11.	"I am Skull Face"	Ludvig Forssell		3:31
12.	"Hal's Child Unchained"	Justin Burnett		3:01
13.	"Introduction to Africa"	Ludvig Forssell		2:30
14.	"Encounter on the Plains"	Ludvig Forssell		1:57
15.	"A Factory of Death"	Ludvig Forssell		1:57
16.	"The Code Talker"	Ludvig Forssell		4:07
17.	"Metallic Archaea"	Ludvig Forssell		2:08
18.	"OKB Zero"	Ludvig Forssell		2:10
19.	"Angering Mantis"	Justin Burnett		7:01
20.	"Sahelanthropus Dominion"	Justin Burnett		6:19
21.	"Return"	Ludvig Forssell		2:57
22.	"Sins of the Father"	Akihiro Honda (music), Ludvig Forssell (lyrics)	Donna Burke	4:54

Metal Gear Solid V original soundtrack (disc 2)
No.	Title	Writer(s)	Performed by	Length
1.	"Quiet's Theme"	Akihiro Honda (music), Ludvig Forssell (lyrics)	Stefanie Joosten	3:12
2.	"Here's to You"	Ennio Morricone (music), Joan Baez (lyrics)	Joan Baez	3:42
3.	"Not Your Kind of People"	Garbage	Garbage	4:59
4.	"Nuclear"	Mike Oldfield	Mike Oldfield	5:03
5.	"Ground Zeroes"	Ludvig Forssell		1:50
6.	"Camp Omega"	Ludvig Forssell		1:28
7.	"Withered Peace"	Ludvig Forssell		2:22
8.	"The Girl's Gone"	Ludvig Forssell		2:44
9.	"Bloodstained Anthem"	Ludvig Forssell		1:23
10.	"She's Rigged"	Harry Gregson-Williams		3:01
11.	"The Fall of Mother Base"	Harry Gregson-Williams		3:32
12.	"Drop Off"	Ludvig Forssell		1:19
13.	"Beautiful Mirage – An Unexpected Visitor"	Ludvig Forssell		4:18
14.	"On the Trail"	Ludvig Forssell		2:02
15.	"Steel Embers"	Daniel James		2:03
16.	"Infected"	Ludvig Forssell		4:03
17.	"Battling Armor"	Justin Burnett		5:26
18.	"Shining Lights, Even in Death"	Ludvig Forssell		4:03
19.	"Fortress"	Ludvig Forssell		2:05
20.	"Disarmament"	Ludvig Forssell		1:37
21.	"Swift Judgement"	Ludvig Forssell		1:53
22.	"Darkness Roars"	Ludvig Forssell		3:31
23.	"Beautiful Mirage – The Vision Fades"	Ludvig Forssell		1:52
24.	"Objective Complete"	Ludvig Forssell		1:45
25.	"African Battlecry"	Ludvig Forssell		2:07
26.	"Metal Gear Online"	Daniel James		3:26
27.	"A Phantom Pain"	Ludvig Forssell		3:59
28.	"Various Jingles"	Ludvig Forssell		0:53
