= Snake Eater (song) =

2004 song by Cynthia Harrell

- The ladder sequence of Metal Gear Solid 3: Snake Eater, where the song is played

Song by Cynthia Harrell

from the album Metal Gear Solid 3: Snake Eater Original Soundtrack
- Recorded: 2004
- Genre: Video game music; big band; jazz
- Length: 2:57
- Label: King
- Songwriter: Norihiko Hibino
- Producer: Rika Muranaka

Licensed audio
- "Snake Eater" on YouTube

"Snake Eater" is the theme song for the 2004 video game Metal Gear Solid 3: Snake Eater, written by Norihiko Hibino and performed by Cynthia Harrell. The song is used within the game's opening sequence, as well as a sequence in which the player climbs a long ladder near the end of the game. Originally composed before the game's development as a substitute track, the song was praised by director Hideo Kojima and the final version was performed by a live orchestra.

"Snake Eater" features horns, brass, and string instruments, as well as backing vocals. Several journalists compared the song to the title themes of James Bond films. "Snake Eater" has been met with critical acclaim, with praise for its usage in Metal Gear Solid 3 and Harrell's performance. Other artists have covered the song, including voice actor Donna Burke in 2015. Some publications considered "Snake Eater" among the best video game songs ever made.

== Background and production ==
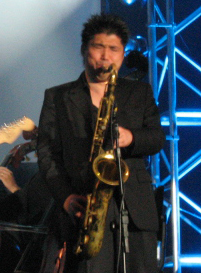
Composer Norihiko Hibino at Video Games Live in 2009

"Snake Eater" was written by Norihiko Hibino and performed by Cynthia Harrell for the 2004 video game Metal Gear Solid 3: Snake Eater. After director Hideo Kojima disliked all of the music being created for the game up to that point, Hibino created "Snake Eater" as a substitute before Metal Gear Solid 3 entered proper development. Initially, Hibino was not supposed to create the song, as another composer was working on the game and Hibino was only in charge of the soundtrack's direction. Instead, Konami composer and music producer Rika Muranaka, the creator of previous Metal Gear Solid themes, pitched a song called "Don't Be Afraid" to be the main theme; Kojima considered it too slow and unsuitable as the theme, preferring "Snake Eater".

Prior to performing "Snake Eater", Harrell was known for her performance of "I Am the Wind", the closing theme of Castlevania: Symphony of the Night. During the composition of "Snake Eater", Harrell was requested by her friend, Muranaka, to perform a demo version. She felt there was "something special" about it. Months later, King Records, the publisher of Metal Gear Solid 3: Snake Eater Original Soundtrack, requested that Harrell perform the final version in Los Angeles with a live orchestra; she finished it in two takes. Hibino composed two additional versions: with Japanese lyrics performed by Akiko Wada, and a special version created for E3. In 2015, a hip-hop remix performed by actor Donna Burke, with additional reverb and echo effects, was included on the Japan-exclusive album Metal Gear Solid Vocal Tracks. Burke re-recorded the song in 2023.

In Metal Gear Solid 3: Snake Eater, the song is first featured in the opening. It later appears in a lengthy ladder-climbing sequence after defeating The End, a boss fight. During the ladder sequence, the song is reduced to only vocals, which echo through the concrete tunnel. A snippet of the song was included in the 2023 reveal trailer for Metal Gear Solid Delta: Snake Eater, a remake of Metal Gear Solid 3; a re-recorded version of the song is featured in the remake's opening cutscene. An instrumental version was featured in the 2008 video game Super Smash Bros. Brawl. Cover versions have been performed by the Video Game Orchestra in 2013 and 8-Bit Big Band in 2022.

== Composition and lyrics ==
"Snake Eater"
An 18-second sample of "Snake Eater". Harrell's intense vocal delivery is accompanied by horns, brass, and string instruments. Several journalists considered the lyrics cheesy, though some felt it was intentional.

"Snake Eater" was composed with chromatic chord progressions and uses horns, brass, and string instruments. Harrell's intense vocal delivery is accompanied by backing vocals. During the tunnel sequence, her voice is prioritized over the wind ambience and sounds made by the player. Several outlets compared the song to the title themes of James Bond films, particularly due to its instrumentation, vocals, and imagery; writing in The Soundtrack, Jennifer Smith considered it a parody of James Bond's title character's "misogynistic use of women".

According to Hibino, the lyrics were intended to reflect the perspectives of both Naked Snake—the game's protagonist—and Eva, but left ambiguous enough to be interpreted in different ways. Kotaku's Ash Parrish felt the lyrics implied the song was performed from the perspective of the Boss, one of the game's characters. In the context of the game, Smith wrote the song was "used to pace the story and to provide a reflective moment" for the player, and felt its non-diegetic usage positioned the female vocalist as the protagonist's narrator.

== Reception ==
"Snake Eater" has been met with praise. Kotaku's Parrish and Destructoid's Chris Carter lauded Harrell's performance, and CNET's Michelle Starr praised Hibino's composition. Video Game Music Online's Oliver Jia considered the song "unforgettable" and deserving of praise but found the lyrics occasionally cheesy. GamesRadar+'s Henry Gilbert and Square Enix Music Online echoed similar thoughts, with the former writing that some lyrics could be viewed as "too silly" and the latter that it used its cheesiness advantageously. Jia found the version featured in Metal Gear Solid Vocal Tracks a "surprisingly good cover", praising Burke's performance.

The song's usage within the game was praised; Game Rant's Harry Sprinks felt it "encapsulate[s] the feeling of Metal Gear Solid 3 perfectly", and Jack Yarwood of Time Extension said it was nearly impossible to talk about the game without also mentioning "Snake Eater". Gilbert praised its usage in the game's opening and Polygon's Allegra Frank in the ladder sequence, noting it "set the tone" for the game. Game Informer's Mike Futter considered the song and ladder sequence among the most memorable themes and moments, respectively, in video games. Tyler Treese of GameRevolution called it a "killer" song and its usage a "beautiful moment" allowing the player to reflect on their accomplishments "and what hardship is to come". Some critics felt the song prevented the ladder sequence from becoming boring and unenjoyable.

"Snake Eater" was the winner of the Best Original Vocal Song – Pop award at the 3rd Annual Game Audio Network Guild Awards in 2005. Several outlets considered it among the best video game songs and best game vocal tracks. Paste's Austin Jones described Harrell as an "indelible and underappreciated legend" in video game music for her performances of "I Am the Wind" and "Snake Eater".
