= Artt Frank =

- Born: March 9, 1933; Westbrook, Maine, U.S.
- Died: November 27, 2024 (aged 91)
- Genre: Jazz
- Occupation: Musician
- Instrument: Drums
- Years active: 1948–2024

Artt Frank (March 9, 1933 – November 27, 2024) was an American jazz drummer specializing in the bebop, hard bop, and cool jazz styles. He is best known for having toured with trumpet player Chet Baker during much of his career.

== Life and career ==
Frank was born in Westbrook, Maine, and was one of seven children. He took up the drums in 1939 after hearing jazz musicians such as drummer Gene Krupa and saxophone player Charlie Parker on the radio, learning to play solely by ear. According to drummer Stan Levey, Frank first arrived on the New York bebop scene in 1948. Musicians Frank played with during this time include Parker, Dexter Gordon, Sonny Stitt, and Bud Powell.

Frank served on the USS Des Moines during the Korean War, but he continued to listen to jazz recordings on the radio. He first heard a recording of trumpeter Chet Baker in 1953, and first met Baker later that year at Storyville, a jazz club in Boston.

Frank later moved to California and continued to pursue his career as a drummer. According to some accounts, he rediscovered Baker at a gas station in 1967, where the trumpet player was working after having lost his teeth and consequently his ability to play the instrument. Another account indicates Frank passed Donte's, a jazz club where Baker was playing, on the way to a gig. Frank worked extensively with Baker until he died in 1988, and two albums came out of live performances: Burnin' at Backstreet (1980) and Live at the Renaissance II (1984). Frank was known for playing "brushes at stick level and sticks at brush level," which suited Baker's playing style. Frank played with Sal Nistico, Lorne Lofsky, Chris Connors, Drew Salperto, and Michael Formanek on these live albums with Baker.

After Baker's death in 1988, Frank wrote and published a biography of Baker titled Chet Baker: The Missing Years, which was notable for its "conversational narrative" and extensive knowledge of previously unknown details about Baker. The book focuses on Baker's comeback from 1967–1971 and the later years the two toured and recorded two live albums during the 1980s.

Frank recorded several albums as joint leader with trumpet player Pat Morrissey, saxophone player Ken Barry, pianist Chris Clarke, and bassist Phil Bowler starting in the 1990s. In the year 2000, he played a concert series at The Aldrich with this quintet.

In his memoirs Frank claims that Mike Armando made his acquaintance by calling into a radio studio where Phil Bowler was currently broadcasting an interview with him. Frank's subsequent recordings were released under Mike Armando's MJA Records label, beginning with the CD Waltz for Sharon Stone.

Frank was inducted into the Oklahoma Jazz Hall of Fame in 2010.

Frank died on November 27, 2024, at the age of 91.

== Discography ==
=== As leader ===
- Looking for the Light: Tribute to Chet Baker (1992)
- Waltz for Sharon Stone (MJA, 1997)
- Souvenir (MJA, 1999)
- That Trio Thing (MJA, 2003)
- Artt Frank Presents Chris Clarke (MJA, 2015)

=== As sideman ===
==== With Chet Baker ====
- Burnin' at Backstreet (1991)
- Live at the Renaissance II (1992)
