= Phil Bowler =

American jazz musician

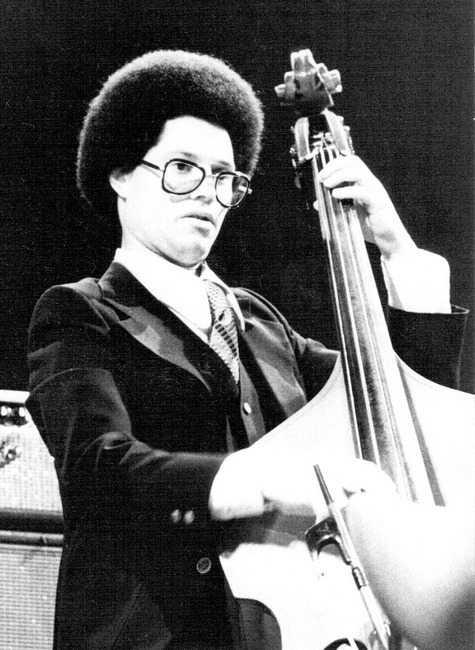
Phil Bowler in November 1976

Phillip Charles Bowler (born March 2, 1948, New York City) is an American jazz double-bassist and radio host.

== Career ==
Bowler attended the University of Hartford, where he received a bachelor's degree in music in 1972. He played with Roland Kirk from 1976–78, then with Hugh Masekela (1980), Joe Lee Wilson (1981), Wynton Marsalis (1982–83), Max Roach (1983), Big Nick Nicholas (1983-85), Slide Hampton, Jon Faddis (1984–89), and Ralph Peterson, Jr. (1987-1996). He played in a quintet with Donald Harrison and Terence Blanchard in 1984–85, touring in Europe with Benny Golson. He recorded with Carla White in 1988 and Sal Salvador in 1989, and led a quartet called Pocket Jungle in 1991. From 1990 to 1997 he played in another group led by Donald Harrison and worked with Jackie McLean in 1997–99. He and Newman Taylor Baker played in a duo in 1997, and in 1998 he worked in the Count Basie Orchestra.

Bowler hosted Jazz Adventures on WPKN radio in Bridgeport, Connecticut, and performed with Artt Frank and Mike Armando from 1981–2011. In 2002 Bowler hosted the MJA Jazz & Blues Festival at Lake Grove, Long Island, New York.

== Discography ==
=== As leader ===
- Pocket Jungle (Zoho, 2014)

=== As sideman ===
With Artt Frank & Pat Morrissey

- Waltz for Sharon Stone (MJA, 1997)
- Souvenir (MJA, 1999)

With Donald Harrison, Terence Blanchard

- Nascence (CBS, 1986)
- Discernment (King, Concord Jazz 1986)
- Indian Blues (Candid, 1992)

With Rahsaan Roland Kirk

- Boogie-Woogie String Along for Real (Warner Bros., 1978)
- Paris 1976 (Royal Jazz, 1990)
- Simmer, Reduce, Garnish and Serve/The Warner Bros. Recordings (Warner Archives, 1995)

With Ralph Peterson

- V (Blue Note, 1988)
- Triangular (Blue Note, 1989)
- Volition (Blue Note, 1990)
- Art (Blue Note, 1993)

With others

- Cherish the Ladies, The Girls Won't Leave the Boys Alone (Windham Hill, 2001)
- Dr. John, Funky New Orleans (Metro, 2000)
- Jon Faddis, Into the Faddisphere (Epic, 1989)
- Lightnin' Hopkins, Lightnin's Boogie (Justin Time, 2016)
- Branford Marsalis, Scenes in the City (Columbia, 1984)
- Wynton Marsalis, Think of One (CBS, 1983)
- Jackie McLean, Fire & Love (Somethin' Else, 1997)
- Big Nick Nicholas, Big and Warm (India Navigation, 1983)
- Max Roach, Live at Vielharmonie (Soul Note, 1985)
- Sal Salvador, Crystal Image (Stash, 1989)
- Carla White, Mood Swings (Milestone, 1988)
