= Metal Gear Solid 2: Sons of Liberty =

2001 video game

- North American cover art
- Developer: Konami Computer Entertainment Japan (Note: Substance ported to Windows by Success. PlayStation 3 and Xbox 360 HD Edition developed by Bluepoint Games and ported to PlayStation Vita by Armature Studio. HD Edition ported to Nintendo Switch, PlayStation 4, PlayStation 5, Windows and Xbox Series X/S as part of Master Collection Vol. 1 by Rocket Studio.)
- Publisher: Konami
- Director: Hideo Kojima
- Producer: Hideo Kojima
- Designer: Hideo Kojima
- Programmer: Kazunobu Uehara
- Artist: Yoji Shinkawa
- Writers: Hideo Kojima; Tomokazu Fukushima
- Composers: Harry Gregson-Williams; Norihiko Hibino
- Series: Metal Gear
- Platforms: PlayStation 2: Substance; Xbox; Windows
- Release: November 13, 2001: PlayStation 2; NA: November 13, 2001; JP: November 29, 2001; EU: March 8, 2002; Substance; Xbox; NA: November 5, 2002; EU: March 7, 2003; PlayStation 2; JP: December 19, 2002; NA: March 4, 2003; EU: March 28, 2003; Windows; NA: March 27, 2003; EU: March 28, 2003
- Genres: Action-adventure, stealth
- Mode: Single-player

Metal Gear Solid 2: Sons of Liberty (Note: Japanese: メタルギアソリッド2 サンズ・オブ・リバティ, Hepburn: Metaru Gia Soriddo Tsū: Sanzu obu Ribati) is a 2001 action-adventure stealth game developed and published by Konami for the PlayStation 2. Directed, produced, designed, and written by Hideo Kojima, it is the fourth mainline game in the Metal Gear series and the sequel to Metal Gear Solid (1998). Divided into two chapters, the prologue "Tanker" section focuses on Solid Snake as he infiltrates a hijacked Marine Corps ship to obtain evidence of a new Metal Gear mecha named Metal Gear RAY. The primary "Plant" section revolves around rookie FOXHOUND agent Raiden infiltrating the Big Shell, a massive offshore clean-up facility seized by the terroristic Sons of Liberty, who hold the President of the United States hostage and threaten to destroy the facility if their demands are not met. However, the protagonists soon uncover a world-shaking conspiracy constructed by a powerful organization known as the Patriots, exploring many themes such as memetics, social engineering, artificial intelligence, virtual reality, and the internal struggle of freedom of thought.

Developed over four years with a team of over 100 people, Metal Gear Solid 2 features many new gameplay mechanics over its predecessor, including multi-level environments, squad-based enemy AI, and first-person aiming. Raiden was notably kept hidden from marketing material, which featured and implied Solid Snake as the main protagonist of the game. The story underwent numerous changes, such as an early Middle Eastern setting and revisions to the finale in response to the September 11 attacks. Harry Gregson-Williams and Norihiko Hibino composed the score. The game was released in November 2001 for North America and Japan and March 2002 for Europe, and an expanded edition titled Metal Gear Solid 2: Substance was released the following year in each region for the PlayStation 2, Xbox and Windows.

Metal Gear Solid 2 received acclaim for its gameplay, graphics, and attention to detail. However, critics were initially divided on the philosophical nature of the game's storyline, while the new protagonist Raiden drew backlash from fans. The game was a commercial success, selling seven million copies by 2004. It has since been considered to be one of the greatest video games of all time, as well as a leading example of artistic expression in video games. The game is often considered ahead of its time for dealing with themes and concepts such as post-truth politics, fake news, alternative facts, synthetic media, and echo chambers that became culturally relevant in the 2010s onward, and has often been cited as the first postmodern video game. A remaster of the game was released as part of the Metal Gear Solid HD Collection (2011), which was re-released in the Metal Gear Solid: The Legacy Collection (2013) and Metal Gear Solid: Master Collection Vol. 1 (2023) compilations. A prequel to the series, Metal Gear Solid 3: Snake Eater, was released in 2004, while a direct sequel, Metal Gear Solid 4: Guns of the Patriots, was released in 2008.

== Gameplay ==
Solid Snake takes cover and peeks around a corner in the Tanker chapter.

Metal Gear Solid 2 carries the subtitle of "Tactical Espionage Action," and most of the game involves the protagonist sneaking around to avoid being seen by the enemies. Most fundamental is the broader range of skills offered to the player. The first-person aiming mode allows players to target specific points in the game, greatly expanding tactical options; guards can be blinded by steam, distracted by a flying piece of fruit or hit in weak spots. Players can walk slowly, allowing them to sneak over noisy flooring without making a sound, or hang off walkways to slip past below guards' feet. The corner-press move from Metal Gear Solid, which allowed players a sneak peek around the next bend, is expanded to allow players to fire from cover. Other abilities included leaping over and hanging off of railings, opening and hiding in storage lockers, and sneaking up behind enemies to hold them at gunpoint for items and ammunition. Players can shoot out the enemy's radio, so they are unable to communicate with others on their team. The environment also has a more significant impact on the stealth gameplay, taking into account factors such as weather, smell, atmosphere, and temperature.

In Metal Gear Solid 2, the enemy guards are given more advanced AI "to prevent an imbalance of power", and unlike the original Metal Gear Solid, work in squads. They call on their radios for a strike team upon seeing the player, then attempt to flank him and cut off his escape while avoiding the player's attacks. Often strike teams will carry body armor and riot shields, making them a greater threat. Even if the player escapes to a hiding place, a team will sweep in to check the area. The game has a collective enemy AI, where enemy guards work together in squads, can communicate with one another, and react more realistically towards the player. The game's enemy AI was considered one of the best in gaming for many years.

The game expanded its predecessor's cover mechanic, with Solid Snake or Raiden able to take cover behind walls or objects and pop out to shoot at enemies, while the improved enemy AI allowed enemies to also take cover from the player character. The enemies will often take cover to call for backup, but during battle, they will take cover then pop out and shoot at the player or blindly throw grenades from behind their cover. The game features a laser sight mechanic, where a laser sight helps assist with manually aiming a gun. Boss battles and set-pieces remain a case of finding a strategy that bypasses the defenses of the enemy. However, in a major break from action game standards, it is also possible to clear the entire game, including boss fights, without causing a single deliberate death, through use of tranquilizer guns, stun grenades, and melee attacks.

== Synopsis ==
=== Setting ===
Sons of Liberty takes place within an alternate history of events, in which the Cold War ended during the late 1990s. The game's story focuses on two narratives that occur around and near New York City – the first in 2007, two years after the events of Metal Gear Solid; and the second in 2009. The game's plot is the fourth chapter of an overarching plot concerning the character of Solid Snake.

=== Characters ===
The main protagonist of Metal Gear Solid 2 is a young rookie agent named Raiden. He is supported by his commanding officer, the Colonel, and Rosemary, his girlfriend. Allies formed on the mission include Lt. Junior Grade Iroquois Pliskin, a Navy SEAL of mysterious background who provides his knowledge of the facility; Peter Stillman, an NYPD bomb-disposal expert; Otacon, a computer security specialist and friend of Solid Snake; and a cyborg ninja imitating Gray Fox's persona, first calling itself Deepthroat, then changing its name to Mr. X.

The antagonists are the Sons of Liberty, a group of terrorists who seize control of the Big Shell environmental cleanup facility off the coast of New York City, including anti-terrorist training unit gone rogue Dead Cell, and a Russian mercenary force that patrols the facility. The Dead Cell team members are Vamp, a seemingly immortal man exhibiting vampire-like attributes; Fatman, a rotund man with exceptional knowledge of bombs; and Fortune, a woman whose uncontrollable psychic ability prevents any bodily harm from befalling her. The leader of Sons of Liberty claims to be Solid Snake, previously declared dead after a terrorist attack, later revealed to be Solidus Snake, a third clone of the "Les Enfants Terribles" project. Assisting the Sons of Liberty are Olga Gurlukovich, commander of the Russian mercenaries, and Revolver Ocelot, a disenfranchised Russian nationalist and former FOXHOUND agent, Solid Snake's old nemesis, and henchman of Solidus Snake.

Other characters include Emma Emmerich, Otacon's stepsister and a computer whiz-kid; Sergei Gurlukovich, Ocelot's former commanding officer and Olga's father; President James Johnson, held hostage by the Sons of Liberty; and DIA operative Richard Ames. Liquid Snake returns, seemingly by possessing the body of Ocelot through a transplanted hand. The game also features cameos by Mei Ling, the communications expert who aided Snake in the first game, and Johnny Sasaki, the luckless soldier with chronic digestive problems.

=== Plot ===
In 2007, Solid Snake infiltrates a tanker traveling down the Hudson River in New York City carrying a new Metal Gear model, RAY. The tanker is hijacked by a group of Russian mercenaries, led by Colonel Sergei Gurlukovich, his daughter Olga, and Ocelot. Ocelot betrays his allies and scuttles the ship in the lower New York Harbor. Upon seeing Snake, Ocelot is possessed by the will of Liquid Snake and escapes with RAY.

Two years later, Solid Snake has been framed as a terrorist for his actions and an environmental clean-up facility called the Big Shell has been erected in the lower New York Harbor to clear up the oil spill caused by the Tanker Incident.

During a tour by US President James Johnson, a terrorist group known as the Sons of Liberty raid the facility, take Johnson hostage, and threaten to destroy it if their demands are not met. FOXHOUND's Raiden is ordered by the Colonel to rescue the hostages and disarm the terrorists. The surviving members of a responding Navy SEAL team, Iroquois Pliskin (secretly Solid Snake) and explosives expert Peter Stillman, help Raiden to disable bombs planted throughout the facility by Fatman. However, the bombs are a decoy that, after being disarmed, activate a timed bomb, which detonates and kills Stillman. Raiden kills Fatman and encounters a mysterious cyborg ninja, who assists him with information. Raiden and Pliskin arrange to transport hostages out of the Big Shell via helicopter, but are confronted by Dead Cell's leader identifying as Solid Snake, flying a Harrier. Raiden shoots down the Harrier, but "Solid Snake" escapes with the stolen Metal Gear RAY. Pliskin reveals he is the real Solid Snake and, along with Otacon, helps locate Johnson.

Metal Gear RAY catching the AV-8B Harrier mid-fall after Raiden and Snake destroy it with Stinger missiles

Upon being rescued, Johnson reveals to Raiden that the United States' democratic process is merely a drama orchestrated by an organization known as "the Patriots", who secretly control the country from the shadows. Furthermore, he reveals that the Big Shell is a façade created to hide Arsenal Gear, a submersible mobile fortress that houses an AI called "GW". He explains that the leader of Dead Cell is his predecessor George Sears, a clone of Big Boss known as Solidus Snake, who, having fallen out with the Patriots, plans to seize Arsenal and overthrow them. Johnson attempts to make Raiden kill him in order to prevent the Sons of Liberty from carrying out a nuclear strike, but Raiden refuses; Ocelot then appears and kills Johnson instead.

Raiden is then tasked with rescuing computer programmer Emma Emmerich, step-sister of Otacon, who plans to upload a virus into GW to disable Arsenal. Before he is able to find Emma, Raiden is confronted by Vamp, who he fights and seemingly kills. Emma is rescued, but before Raiden is able to rendezvous with Snake and Otacon, Vamp reappears and stabs Emma before being shot by Raiden. Emma uploads the virus but dies from her injuries, and the virus is cut off prematurely. Snake tasks a distraught Otacon with rescuing the hostages, then seemingly betrays Raiden and allows him to be captured by the ninja, revealed to be Olga. The Big Shell collapses as Arsenal departs.

Raiden awakens on Arsenal before Solidus, who reveals that he was the one who raised Raiden as a child soldier during the Liberian civil war. Solidus leaves and Olga frees Raiden, explaining she is a Patriot double-agent forced to aid Raiden in exchange for her child's safety. After the Colonel begins acting erratically, Raiden discovers that he has merely been a construct of GW the entire mission, now damaged by the virus. Rose confesses to Raiden that she had been ordered by the Patriots to become his lover and spy on him. She begins to tell him that she is pregnant with his child, but her transmission is abruptly cut off. Raiden finds Snake, who had helped Olga capture Raiden so that they could gain entry to Arsenal. Fortune battles Snake, while Raiden is forced into battle with AI-controlled Metal Gear RAYs. The virus causes the RAYs to malfunction, and Olga sacrifices herself in an attempt to allow Raiden to escape from Solidus.

Snake and Raiden are captured and taken to the top of Arsenal by Solidus, Fortune, and Ocelot. Solidus reveals that his objective was not to seize Arsenal, but to use information contained in GW to find the true identities of the Patriots' twelve highest ranking members, known as the Wisemen's Committee. However, Ocelot reveals himself to be a Patriot agent. He explains that the entire affair has been an exercise dubbed the Solid Snake Simulation, or S3 Plan, carefully orchestrated by the Patriots over the course of several years with the goal of artificially creating a soldier (Raiden) on par with Solid Snake, accomplished by recreating the environment of the Shadow Moses Incident. (Note: As depicted in Metal Gear Solid) Ocelot kills Fortune before being possessed again by Liquid Snake. Liquid explains that Ocelot's severed right arm was replaced with his own, and plans to hunt down the Patriots using his host's knowledge and the stolen RAY. Snake pursues Liquid, as Arsenal loses control.

Arsenal crashes into Manhattan, coming to a stop at Federal Hall. Raiden is contacted by an AI impersonating the Colonel and Rose. It states that GW was the only AI destroyed, and that, rather than the Solid Snake Simulation, the S3 Plan is in reality a method known as the Selection for Societal Sanity. The S3 Plan's real purpose is to control human thought in order to prevent society's regression in the digital era from trivial information drowning knowledge and truth, and the Big Shell incident was actually an exercise meant to stress test its effectiveness under extreme circumstances. They order Raiden to eliminate Solidus; refusal will result in the deaths of Olga's child and Rose. Raiden mortally wounds Solidus, who throws himself from the roof of Federal Hall and dies at the foot of the George Washington statue.

Snake reappears, having planted a tracker on Liquid's RAY. Snake tells Raiden that he and Otacon plan to rescue Olga's child, and locate the Patriots, whose details were hidden in the GW virus disc. Raiden wishes to join the two of them, but Snake refuses this and leaves. Instead, Raiden is reunited with the real Rose. The two reconcile, and Raiden proposes to her.

In the epilogue, having decoded the disc, Otacon and Snake find it contains data on all twelve members of the Wisemen's Committee (Note: Information about this group would be later revealed in Metal Gear Solid 3: Snake Eater)—however, the members named in the data have apparently all been dead for roughly 100 years.

== Themes and analysis ==
Colonel: [I]n the current, digitized world, trivial information is accumulating every second, preserved in all its triteness. Never fading, always accessible.
Rose: Rumors about petty issues, misinterpretations, slander.
Colonel: All this junk data preserved in an unfiltered state, growing at an alarming rate.
Rose: It will only slow down social progress, reduce the rate of evolution. [...]
Colonel: The digital society furthers human flaws, and selectively rewards development of convenient half-truths. [...]
Rose: Everyone withdraws into their own small gated community, afraid of a larger forum. They stay inside their little ponds, leaking whatever "truth" suits them into the growing cesspool of society at large.
Colonel: The different cardinal truths neither clash nor mesh. No one is invalidated, but nobody is right.
Rose: Not even natural selection can take place here. The world is being engulfed in "truth".
Colonel: And this is the way the world ends. Not with a bang, but a whimper.

— Metal Gear Solid 2: Sons of Liberty

Metal Gear Solid 2 is often considered the first example of a postmodern video game, and has often been cited as a primary example of artistic expression in video games. The storyline explored many social, philosophical and cyberpunk themes in significant detail, including meme theory, social engineering, sociology, artificial intelligence, information control, fifth-generation warfare, conspiracy theories, political and military maneuvering, evolution, existentialism, censorship, the nature of reality, the Information Age, virtual reality, child exploitation, LGBT themes, and the moral dilemma between security and personal liberty. Since its release, the game's themes have been studied and analyzed by numerous writers, journalists, and academics. MGS2, along with its predecessor, has been featured in the Smithsonian American Art Museum's exhibition, The Art of Video Games, in 2012.

In his paper How Videogames Express Ideas, Matthew Weise of the Massachusetts Institute of Technology described Sons of Liberty as "perhaps the most vivid example of a game that uses tension between different levels of player agency to fuel a multi-faceted ideological argument", noting Solidus Snake's suggestion of the United States being a "totalitarian regime of thought control" and pointing to the "very meta concept" of "how the designer's imposed plan or path for the player maps to the tyrannical nature of the government", where, "like the player, Jack has no agency other than what his puppet masters give him." In the book Joystick Soldiers: The Politics of Play in Military Video Games, Tanner Higgin examined the game's "resistant and subversive counter-history of military engagement", describing its "convoluted narrative and unconventional gameplay logics" as a "critique" of "the very networks of biopolitical and informational control that comprise the postmodern military, and posthumanity generally", and noting that it "purposefully manufactures frustration and negative affect" to "highlight the typically unexamined codes, conventions, and hidden pleasures of the military game genre".

Steven Poole commented in a 2012 Edge column, "the story of MGS2, with its mythic wit and sweep, is still in a different league from the vast majority of videogame yarns. ... [H]owever, the fact that MGS2 still seems so avant-garde today might well prompt a worry: does it represent the pinnacle of a now-vanished era, the age of the experimental mainstream? This was, after all, a big-budget commercial boxed product that gleefully took risks and subverted genre conventions at every turn. Modern blockbuster games play it painfully safe by comparison." Gamasutra notes that the game deals with issues concerning the Information Age, and has compared the game's themes to the philosophies of Thomas Hobbes, Friedrich Nietzsche, and Georg Wilhelm Friedrich Hegel. The existential themes of the game align with the political philosophy and theses of Isaiah Berlin and Georg Wilhelm Friedrich Hegel, focusing on the struggle between freedom and equality, and Berlin's concept of the "pursuit of the ideal", as the player's internal conflict of ideals are one of the main driving forces of the plot.

The game is considered to be ahead of its time for dealing with themes and concepts that later became culturally relevant in the 2010s. The game has been described as "profound", particularly the final dialogue scene between Raiden and the AI posing as the Colonel and Rose. In 2011, Dugan Patrick of Gamasutra drew comparisons to social media and social gaming, and found that the game predicted elements of Facebook, such as allowing "people to intentionally censor their own experience within the self-curated walls of Facebook". In 2016, Alex Wiltshire of Glixel found the game to be "strangely prescient of not only its own time but also today", noting how it dodged "truth at every turn" and comparing it to post-truth politics, Facebook's curated News Feed, and the 2016 United States presidential election. Further comparisons have been drawn to concepts that became mainstream during the 2010s, such as fake news, echo chambers, and alternative facts. According to Cameron Kunzelman of Vice, Metal Gear Solid 2 is still politically relevant in 2017. In March 2018, GamesRadar drew comparisons to recent political events including the Facebook–Cambridge Analytica data scandal and the investigations involving Russian interference in the 2016 United States elections.

In 2018, Adrian Mróz published a paper in the academic journal Kultura i Historia, where the "idea of Selection for Societal Sanity" from the game is "applied into a philosophical framework based on select concepts from Bernard Stiegler's writing and incorporating them with current events such as post-truth or fake news in order to explore the role of techne and filtration within social organizations and individual psyches." He notes that, despite being released in an era of neoliberal dominance, the game's themes resonate with current affairs in the late 2010s, such as post-truth, the collapse of political correctness, cognitive dissonance, and "the problem of filtering within a society flooded by information". IGN said its "fourth-wall-obliterating final act posed a number of terrifying questions about the overload of data in the Information Age, and how technology has led to an increasingly shaky definition" of "reality", and has drawn comparisons to deep fakes, machine learning, and information warfare.

== Development ==
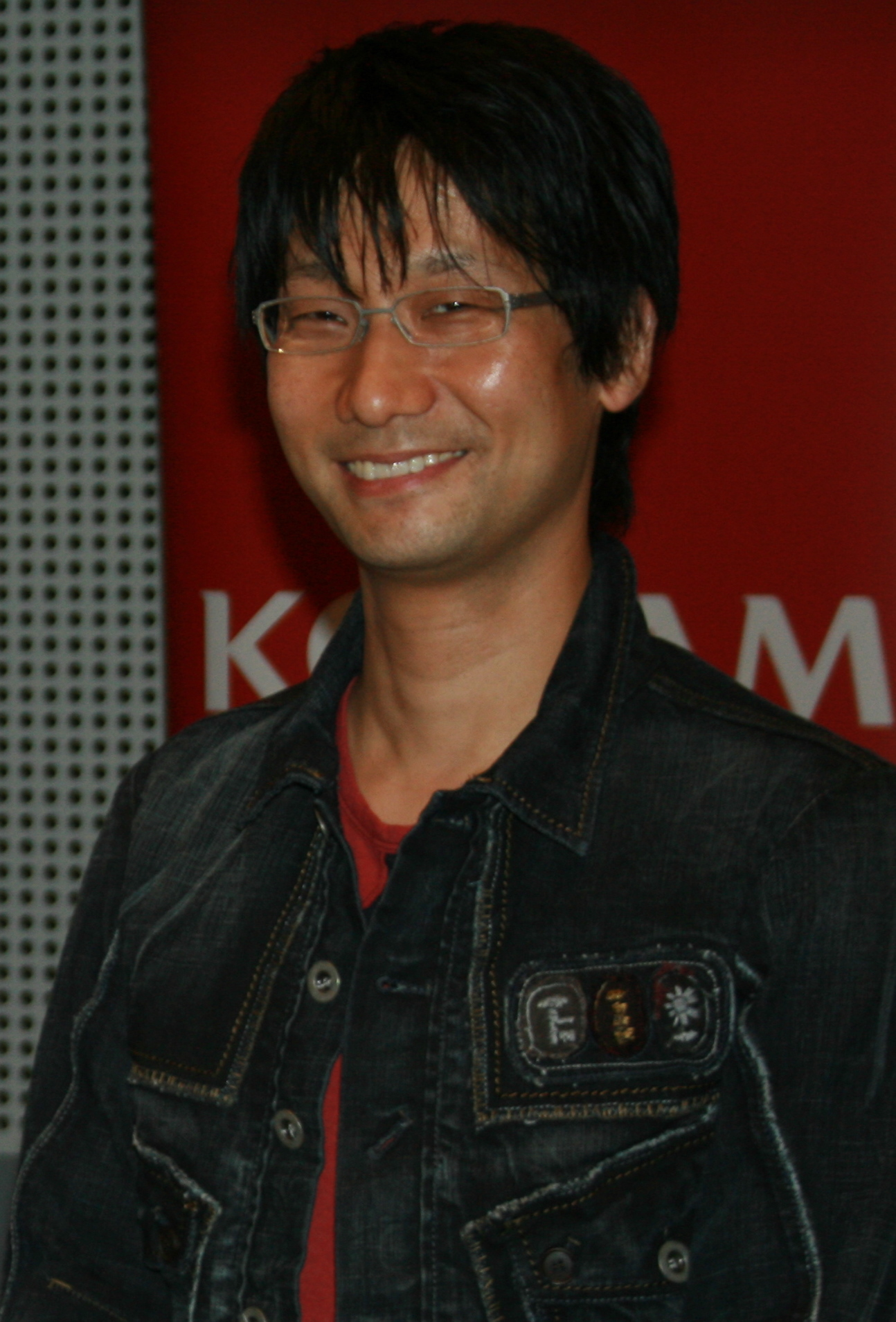
Hideo Kojima in 2007

The creator Hideo Kojima's original design document for the game was completed in January 1999. The Japanese document was published by Konami in 2002, and translated into English in 2006. It mentioned that the game was originally going to be called Metal Gear Solid III to symbolize Manhattan's three tallest skyscrapers. The document outlines new game mechanics and features, such as bodies that need to be hidden, enemies being able to detect shadows, lights in an area that can be destroyed to affect enemy vision, realistic enemy AI that relies on squad tactics rather than working individually, and multi-level environments that add an element of "vertical tension" to the stealth gameplay. It also outlines themes, such as passing on memories, environmental issues, and particularly social themes regarding the "digitization of the military", digital simulations, the "digitization of operational planning", the "digitization of everyday life", and the "effects of digitization on personality". The document stated that the "aim of the story" involves "a series of betrayals and sudden reversals, to the point where the player is unable to tell fact from fiction" (departing from the "very clear and understandable story" of its predecessor), that "every character lies to (betrays) someone once", blurring the line between "what is real, and what is fantasy", and "ironies aimed at the digital society and gaming culture".

The game's production budget was $10 million, similar to the budget of a Japanese Godzilla film. Kojima states that when he "heard about the hardware for the PlayStation 2", he "wanted to try something new. Up to that point, all cutscenes had focused more on details like facial expressions, but I wanted to pay more attention to the surroundings, to see how much I could change them in real time." The game was in development for four years and over 100 people worked on it.

=== Protagonist switch ===
For Metal Gear Solid 2, the established protagonist of Solid Snake was only made playable for the prologue portion of the game. A new protagonist named Raiden would substitute him as the player character for the main portion. The decision to introduce a new protagonist came from the idea of portraying Solid Snake from another character's perspective, but also to get around the dilemma of having to write gameplay tutorials directed at Snake, as Kojima felt that having to explain mission procedures and weapon handling to a veteran soldier like Snake would have felt unnatural after three mainline titles. Raiden was also deliberately designed to appeal to more players after the team received feedback from debuggers and testers of the first game about "only [playing] rugged old-looking guys in these games." Raiden's presence in the game was kept a secret before release, with preview trailers showing Snake in situations and battles that occurred to Raiden in the published game, such as a battle against a Harrier on George Washington Bridge and an encounter with the new Cyborg Ninja inside the tanker.

=== Plot changes ===
According to Kojima in the documentary Metal Gear Saga Vol. 1, the original plot of the game revolved around nuclear weapon inspections in Iraq and Iran and had Solid Snake trying to stop the Metal Gear while it was located on an aircraft carrier, in a certain time limit, while trying to stop Liquid Snake and his group. However, about six months into the project, the political situation in the Middle East became a concern, and they decided that they could not make a game with such a plot. The tanker in the released game is based on this original plot.

MGS2 was also intended to reference the novel City of Glass, notably in the naming of its characters. Raiden's support team originally featured a different field commander named Colonel Daniel Quinn; Maxine "Max" Work, an Asian woman who saves game data and quotes Shakespeare; and William "Doc" Wilson, the creator of GW. All take their names from key characters in the book, and all three would have turned out to be AIs. None of these characters survived to the final edition, their roles being absorbed by other characters, namely the "Colonel Campbell" simulation, Rose, and Emma Emmerich. Peter Stillman, however, takes his name from another City of Glass character.

A character named Chinaman, originally planned to be included as a villain, was later on omitted and his abilities incorporated in Vamp, namely the ability to walk on water and walls. Chinaman would have movements modeled after Jet Li and have a body tattoo of a dragon that would come alive as soon as he dove into the water.

Significant changes to the game's ending were made late in development following the September 11 attacks in New York, where the finale occurs. A sequence depicting Arsenal Gear's displacement of the Statue of Liberty and crashing through half of Manhattan was removed, as was a short coda to appear after the credits, a breaking newscast showing the Statue of Liberty's new resting place, Ellis Island. Other deleted scenes included Solidus shredding the New York Stock Exchange flag with his sword during the crash of Arsenal Gear and the fall of this flag over his body after his death, and American flags that were supposed to be on all the flagpoles in New York were removed from the title. The Japanese spelling of the name "Raiden" was changed from katakana (ライデン) to kanji (雷電) due to the former form of the name resembling "Bin Laden" in Japanese. (Note: See the Japanese language Wikipedia for information about spelling variations of Osama bin Laden.)

=== Music ===
TAPPY / Harry Gregson-Williams
"Metal Gear Solid Main Theme"
30-second sample from the main theme of Metal Gear Solid 2: Sons of Liberty, composed by TAPPY and Harry Gregson-Williams.

Kojima's choice of composer for Metal Gear Solid 2 was highly publicized in the run-up to the game's release. The original intention was to have film composer Hans Zimmer but his rate was exceptionally high. Kojima decided upon Harry Gregson-Williams, another composer from Zimmer's studio, after watching The Replacement Killers with sound director Kazuki Muraoka. A mix CD containing 18 tracks of Gregson-Williams' work was sent to his office. Flattered by the research put into creating the CD (as some of the tracks were unreleased, and some songs he had worked on for certain films were undocumented), he joined the project soon after.

To bypass the language barrier and allow the score to be developed before the cutscenes were finalized, Gregson-Williams was sent short phrases or descriptions of the intended action. The resultant themes then shaped the action sequences in return. Gregson-Williams also arranged and re-orchestrated the original "Metal Gear Solid Main Theme" for use in the game's opening title sequence.

Norihiko Hibino, who had worked on previous Konami games such as Metal Gear: Ghost Babel, was responsible for the in-game music. He also worked on the majority of the game's cutscenes, re-orchestrating Gregson-Williams' "Main Theme" remix for use in several sequences.

As with Metal Gear Solid, the cutscene music includes orchestral and choir pieces, while the in-game soundtrack is scored with ambient music. However, the score as a whole incorporates more electronic elements (particularly breakbeat) than its predecessor, to reflect the plot's thematic thrust of a machine-dominated society. Rika Muranaka again provided a vocal ending theme, a jazz track entitled "Can't Say Goodbye to Yesterday", sung by Carla White. The game's music was released via four CDs: Metal Gear Solid 2: Sons of Liberty Original Soundtrack, Metal Gear Solid 2: Sons of Liberty Soundtrack 2: The Other Side, Metal Gear Solid 2: Substance Limited Sorter (Black Edition) and Metal Gear Solid 2: Substance Ultimate Sorter (White Edition).

The game's main theme was chosen by the London Philharmonic Orchestra for their Greatest Video Game Music compilation, and the theme is a key regular in the Video Games Live concert when the Metal Gear Solid segment is introduced. A segment of the song's main chorus is included in the closing sequence of Metal Gear Solid 3: Snake Eater.

== Release ==
In contrast to the original Metal Gear Solid, Sons of Liberty was released in North America first, on November 13, 2001. Because of the later release in the region, the protagonist switch was not kept a secret in the Japanese version in the weeks before its release. A preview event was held in Zepp Tokyo on the day of the game's North American release in which the character of Raiden was unveiled to the Japanese public. As a result, the Japanese packaging artwork depicts Raiden standing prominently next to Solid Snake, as opposed to only having Snake like on the cover artwork used for the American (and later European) version. A questionnaire was also added in the Japanese version, in which players are asked about their experience with the original Metal Gear Solid and action games in general; the answers to the questionnaire determines the difficulty level of the game and whether the player starts the game on the Tanker chapter or skips directly to the Plant chapter (an option that is only available after clearing the game once in the American version). The Japanese version has a few other additional features over the American version, including two extra game modes unlocked after completing the main game: Boss Survival, in which the player replays through the boss battles from the main game as either Snake or Raiden, and Casting Theater, in which the player can view certain cutscenes from the main game and replace the character models.

The Japanese version was released on November 29, two weeks after the American version. As with the original Metal Gear Solid, Sons of Liberty was sold in a limited "Premium Package" edition in addition to the standard release, which was packaged in a black box containing the game itself with a reversible cover art on the DVD case (with Snake on one side and Raiden on the other), a video DVD known as the Premium Disc, which features a collection of Metal Gear Solid-related commercials and trailers, a metallic Solid Snake figurine, and an 80-page booklet titled Metal Gear Chronicle featuring artwork and commentary about the series.

The European version, which was initially scheduled for February 22, 2002, was released on March 8, nearly four months after the other regions. The added features from the Japanese release were carried over to the European version, along with a new difficulty setting (European Extreme). The European version came packaged with a video DVD titled The Making of Metal Gear Solid 2. As well as collating all of the game's promotional trailers and a GameSpot feature on the game's final days of development, it features a titular documentary produced by French television production house FunTV, which was filmed at KCE Japan West's Japanese studio. The DVD was included as an apology to European consumers for the several months delay that had occurred since the original November release in North America and Japan, which saw numerous European gaming magazines detail the various twists in the game.

=== Substance ===
A screenshot from one of the training missions in Substance. Snake is dressed in a tuxedo.

Metal Gear Solid 2: Substance (Note: Japanese: メタルギアソリッド2 サブスタンス, Hepburn: Metaru Gia Soriddo Tsū: Sabusutansu), the expanded edition of the game, was released on the original Xbox and Windows in addition to the PlayStation 2. (Note: Except in Japan, where Substance was exclusive to the PlayStation 2 as well. This version features Japanese text and English voice acting, similar to the earlier Metal Gear Solid: Integral (the expanded edition of the original Metal Gear Solid).) The Xbox version was initially released in North America as a timed exclusive for the console on November 5, 2002. This was followed by the PlayStation 2 version, released in Japan on December 19 of the same year. Substance was eventually released on PlayStation 2 and Windows in North America and on all three platforms in Europe in March 2003. The console versions were developed internally by KCE Japan, whereas the Windows port was outsourced to Success.

Substance contains several supplemental game modes in addition to the main story mode from the original Sons of Liberty releases. The main game contains all the changes and additions that were made in the Japanese and European versions of the original release (e.g., Boss Survival, Casting Theater, European Extreme), along with further additional changes. Players can now start the main story mode at the Tanker or Plant chapters without the need to answer a questionnaire first, and a new set of collectible dog tags have been added (exclusively on the PlayStation 2 version) based on names submitted from a second contest in addition to the original (2001) set. The visual effect for the thermal goggles was also changed in Substance, and the FHM-licensed posters that adorned several locations in the original Sons of Liberty version have been replaced with public domain images (these were also replaced in The Document of Metal Gear Solid 2). The Xbox and Windows versions feature slight dialogue changes during specific control explanations in which the term "analog stick" was substituted with "thumbstick" (Microsoft's preferred term). The controls were also slightly altered for the Xbox version, due to its fewer shoulder buttons (clicking on the left thumbstick switches between normal and first-person view, while the Y button serves as a lock-on for the player's aim). The Xbox version has support for 5.1 surround sound.

The primary addition of Substance is the inclusion of an extra missions mode with 350 VR missions set in a computer-constructed environment and 150 "Alternative" missions set in areas from the main story. The player can choose to play these missions as Solid Snake or Raiden, with alternate versions of both characters (in different outfits) becoming available as the player progresses. These missions are divided into eight categories (although not all of them are available to every character): Sneaking, Weapon, First Person View (which simulates a first-person shooter), Variety, Hold Up, Bomb Disposal, Elimination, and Photograph.

The other new addition is "Snake Tales", which is a set of five story-based missions featuring Solid Snake as the player character. These missions are primarily set in the Big Shell and involve characters from the main story in new roles such as Fatman, Emma, Vamp and Solidus Snake, while one mission set in the Tanker features Meryl Silverburgh. These missions, which are unrelated to the main campaign and are non-canonical, have no voice-acted cutscenes - instead, the story is told through text-only interludes.

Exclusive to the PlayStation 2 version is a skateboarding minigame in which the player control Snake or Raiden in a pair of Big Shell-themed levels. The player has to complete a set of objectives before time runs out, which range from collecting dog tags scattered throughout the level to blowing up parts of Big Shell. The minigame uses the same engine from Evolution Skateboarding, which was developed by Konami Computer Entertainment Osaka.

On release, Famitsu magazine scored the PlayStation 2 version of the game a 35 out of 40.

=== HD Edition ===
Metal Gear Solid 2: Sons of Liberty – HD Edition was released on the PlayStation 3 and Xbox 360 in 2011 and for the PlayStation Vita in 2012. This version is included in the Metal Gear Solid HD Collection but is also available as a digital download on the PlayStation Network and Xbox Live Arcade. The PS3 and Xbox 360 versions feature an increased 720p resolution and a 16:9 aspect ratio, providing a clearer and wider view of the player's surroundings compared to the original 480i resolution and 4:3 ratio of the PlayStation 2 version, while the PS Vita version runs at qHD resolution. Cutscenes can now be viewed in fullscreen or letterboxed format, while online achievements/trophies have been added as well. Most of the additional content from Metal Gear Solid 2: Substance has also been ported in this version, such as the Missions and Snake Tales modes, although the Skateboarding minigame that was present in the PlayStation 2 version of Substance is absent. The PS3 and Vita versions have a "transfarring" option that allows players to transfer save data between both versions through a Wi-Fi connection or a cloud network. The Vita version has touchscreen and touchpad support for certain gameplay functions such as switching between items and weapons or zooming into cutscenes.

=== Master Edition ===
Metal Gear Solid 2: Sons of Liberty was released in both digital and physical format on the PlayStation 4, PlayStation 5, Xbox Series X|S, Nintendo Switch, and digitally on Steam on October 24, 2023. This version is also bundled as part of Metal Gear Solid Master Collection Vol 1. This edition includes Digital Screenplay Book and Digital Master Book. Although the title drops the 'HD Edition' suffix, this version is based on the HD Edition release on PlayStation 3 and Xbox 360 from 2011. On Nintendo Switch, the game runs in 720p30 in handheld mode, and 1080p30 in TV mode. On other platforms, the game runs in 1080p60.

== Related media ==
=== The Document of Metal Gear Solid 2 ===
The Document of Metal Gear Solid 2 cover art

The Document of Metal Gear Solid 2 was released as a PlayStation 2 software on September 26, 2002, in Japan and North America. It is an interactive database that thoroughly documents the development of Sons of Liberty.

It includes 3D models of characters, scenery, and objects that were used in the game (as well as unused assets), along with corresponding concept art when available. All the real-time cutscenes (or polygon demos) are also available to view (without audio), with the option to pause them at any point, change the camera angle and move them frame by frame. Other content includes storyboards, behind-the-scenes footage, preview trailers, music tracks (with the option to play alternate patterns when applicable), the finalized screenplay, Hideo Kojima's original draft (available in Japanese only), a development timeline, and a gallery of Metal Gear Solid related products and merchandise.

The disc also includes a sample selection of VR training missions that were later featured in Metal Gear Solid 2: Substance. In Europe, the disc was bundled with the PlayStation 2 version of Substance instead of having a stand-alone release. It was also included in the Japanese 20th Anniversary re-release of Metal Gear Solid 2: Sons of Liberty in July 2007.

=== Comics ===
IDW Publishing published a 12-issue comic book adaptation from 2006 to 2007, titled Metal Gear Solid: Sons of Liberty, illustrated by Ashley Wood (who also worked on the comic book adaptation of the previous game) and written by Alex Garner. This version deviates from the game, where many scenes involving Raiden are substituted with Snake.

A digital version of the comic, titled Metal Gear Solid 2: Bande Dessinée, was released on June 12, 2008, in Japan. Originally announced as a PlayStation Portable game, similar to the Metal Gear Solid: Digital Graphic Novel, the digital comic was released as a DVD film instead. A fully voiced version of the graphic novel adaptation of the first Metal Gear Solid is featured as well.

=== Novels ===
A novelization of the game was written by Raymond Benson and published by Del Rey. The American paperback edition was published on November 24, 2009. A majority of the character interaction in the novel is taken verbatim from the Codec conversations in the game itself.

A second novelization by Kenji Yano (written under the pen name Hitori Nojima), titled Metal Gear Solid Substance II, was published by Kadokawa Shoten in Japan on September 24, 2015. This novelization is narrated in real-time during the events of the Plant chapter from the perspective of a young man living in Manhattan.

== Reception ==
Reception

Aggregate score
Aggregator	Score
Metacritic	96/100; 87/100 (Substance, Xbox/PS2); 77/100 (Substance, PC)

Review scores
Publication	Score
Computer and Video Games	9/10
Edge	8/10
Electronic Gaming Monthly	38.5/40
Eurogamer	9/10
Famitsu	10/10, 9/10, 10/10, 9/10
Game Informer	10/10
GamePro	5/5
GameRevolution	A
GamesMaster	96%
GameSpot	9.6/10
GameSpy	5/5
GamesRadar+	96/100
GameZone	9.8/10
IGN	9.7/10
Next Generation	5/5
PlayStation Official Magazine – UK	10/10
Official U.S. PlayStation Magazine	5/5
PlayStation: The Official Magazine	10/10
PSM3	96%

Awards
Publication	Award
Game Informer	Game of the Year
PSM	Game of the Year
CESA Award	Excellence Award
Edge	Innovation of the Year

=== Critical reception ===
Metal Gear Solid 2 received "universal acclaim" according to review aggregator website Metacritic, where it is one of the highest-rated games on the website, and remains the highest-rated exclusive on the PlayStation 2. Game Informer gave the game a score of 10/10, while GameSpot gave the game a 9.6 rating, stating, "It boils down to this: You must play Metal Gear Solid 2." Critics praised the title's stealth gameplay and the improvements over its predecessor, as well as the game's level of graphical detail, particularly in the use of in-game graphics to render plot-driving cutscenes.

The title's storyline, however, was initially divisive and became the source of controversy. Hideo Kojima's ambitious script received praise for exploring numerous social, philosophical, and cyberpunk themes in significant detail, and it has often been called the first example of a postmodern video game. However, some critics considered the plot to be "incomprehensible" and overly cumbersome for an action game, and also felt that the lengthy dialogue sections heavily disrupted the gameplay and that the dialogue itself was overly disjointed and convoluted. The surprise introduction of Raiden as the protagonist for the majority of the game (replacing long-time series protagonist Solid Snake) was also controversial with fans of Metal Gear Solid.

Blake Fischer reviewed the PlayStation 2 version of the game for Next Generation, rating it five stars out of five, and stated that "MGS2 is everything we hoped it would be, and more. Great action, an enthralling story, and plenty of surprises makes this the PS2 game to get this holiday season."

=== Sales ===
There was a high level of anticipation in the gaming community surrounding the release of Metal Gear Solid 2: Sons of Liberty. The game's E3 2000 demo drew a lot of speculation as to the potential for the PlayStation 2, with many commentators praising its level of realism. Hyper Magazine named it "the most anticipated game for the PlayStation 2" in 2001.

In Japan, the game sold 400,000 units in its first day, in addition to its 600,000 pre-orders in the country. Metal Gear Solid 2: Sons of Liberty ultimately sold 687,000 units in 2001, making it the tenth-best-selling video game of 2001 in Japan, and the best-selling Konami game in Japanese Market of that year as well. In the United States, the game sold 500,000 units within two days of release, and 680,000 copies within five. It was the top-selling game in November 2001, with 1.8 million units sold, and topped the video game rental chart the same month. It went on to be one of the top four best-selling games of 2001 in the United States. By July 2006, it had sold 2 million copies and earned $85,000,000 (equivalent to $155,000,000 in 2025) in the United States alone. Next Generation ranked it as the 16th highest-selling game launched for the PlayStation 2, Xbox or GameCube between January 2000 and July 2006 in the country.

In Europe, the game received 1.57 million pre-orders, surpassing Konami's initial expectations of 1 million units. In the United Kingdom, it set a fastest sales record with 200,000 copies sold and £9 million or $13,000,000 (equivalent to $23,000,000 in 2025) grossed within three days. The PlayStation 2 version received a "Platinum" sales award from the Entertainment and Leisure Software Publishers Association (ELSPA), indicating sales of at least 300,000 copies in the United Kingdom. It also received a Platinum Award in Germany for sales above 200,000 units in the country.

The game overall went on to sell over 7 million units by 2003. As of 2004, the original release had sold 5.64 million and Substance had sold 1.39 million for a combined 7.03 million units sold worldwide, making it the highest-selling game in the series.

=== Awards ===
- E3 2000 Game Critics Awards: "Special Commendation for Graphics"
- E3 2001 Game Critics Awards: "Best Console Game," "Best Action/Adventure Game"
- Edge: "Innovation of the Year"
- Game Informer 2001 Game of the Year Awards: "Game of the Year"
- Japan Game Awards 2001-2002: "Excellence Award"
- AIAS' 5th Annual Interactive Achievement Awards: "Outstanding Achievement in Sound Design"

GameSpot named Metal Gear Solid 2 the fourth-best console game of 2001, and presented the game with its annual "Best Music" and "Biggest Surprise" awards among console games. It was nominated in the publication's "Best PlayStation 2 Game", "Best Sound", "Best Story", "Best Graphics, Technical", "Best Graphics, Artistic" and "Best In-Game Water" award categories. During the 5th Annual Interactive Achievement Awards, the Academy of Interactive Arts & Sciences honored Sons of Liberty with the "Sound Design" award, along with nominations for outstanding achievement in "Art Direction" and "Character or Story Development".

Substance was nominated for the 2002 "Best Music on Xbox" and "Best Story on Xbox" awards.

== Legacy ==
Since its launch, Metal Gear Solid 2 has been widely regarded as one of the best and most influential video games of all time. In a 2006 viewer poll conducted by Japan's Famitsu magazine of top 100 games of all time, Metal Gear Solid 2 was ranked at No. 42 in the poll. In the 200th issue of Game Informer Magazine in 2009, its list of top 200 games of all time ranked the game at No. 50 on the list. Metal Gear Solid 2 was ranked No. 7 in Game Informer's 2008 list of the top ten video game openings. In 2010, GamesRadar included the game in its list of top seven games "with mega plot twists you never saw coming". The game was included in Tony Mott and Peter Molyneux's 2011 book 1001 Video Games You Must Play Before You Die. According to John Linneman of Digital Foundry, the game was a technical milestone for its time. It served as a killer app showcasing what the PlayStation 2 hardware was capable of, with the game setting "a new standard in cinematic presentation" and attention to detail, and demonstrating "huge numbers of enemies on screen with bodies that remain in the scene, the interaction of light and shadow, physics interactions with real world objects, multi-tiered environments and advanced enemy AI." This made possible new "gameplay opportunities" and a sense of freedom offered by levels "designed as mini-sandboxes with a tremendous amount of interactivity." The early anticipation that surrounded Metal Gear Solid 2 since its E3 2000 demo has been credited as a critical factor in the PlayStation 2's best-selling success and dominance during the sixth console generation, as well as the demise of Sega's Dreamcast. According to John Szczepaniak, "MGS2 was the game which single-handedly sold Sony's new PlayStation 2 to the masses." In June 2008, the game was in The Guinness World Records: Gamer's Edition 2008 with Metal Gear. Other major outlets praising it as among the best games ever made include Electronic Gaming Monthly, Empire, GameFAQs, GameRankings, IGN, Metacritic, Slant, and Stuff.

In 2009, Wired included the game in its list of "The 15 Most Influential Games of the Decade" at No. 13, concluding that every "videogame story that subverts a player's expectations owes a debt to the ground broken by Metal Gear Solid 2." The artistic influence of Metal Gear Solid 2 can be seen in later video games such as Goichi Suda's similarly postmodern game Killer7, the similarly metanarrative game Portal, the survival horror title Eternal Darkness: Sanity's Requiem, and the first-person shooter BioShock, which featured a similar plot twist to Metal Gear Solid 2. Several game mechanics developed in Metal Gear Solid 2, such as the cover system and laser sight mechanic, have since become staples of stealth games as well as shooters, including Kill Switch (2003), Resident Evil 4 (2005) and Gears of War (2006). The reveal of Metal Gear Solid 2 also led to the development of Splinter Cell, which Ubisoft originally intended to be "a Metal Gear Solid 2 killer." According to Kojima, Metal Gear Solid 2 paid more "attention to the surroundings" in real-time and later "games like Call of Duty have followed this trend of making your surroundings more realistic." Neil Druckmann cited the revelation of Raiden in Metal Gear Solid 2 as an inspiration for the bold surprise in The Last of Us Part II (2020).

In a 20-year retrospective, Christian Smith of Collider said that Metal Gear Solid 2 remains a "controversial masterpiece" that played a pivotal role in "redefining the art of making video games after the turn of the millennium". In 2021, PC Gamer listed the PC version as one of the worst PC ports: "MGS2 worked fine on some systems, but on others you could expect flickering textures, disappearing shadows, missing effects, frequent crashes and flaky audio."

Beyond video games, filmmaker Jordan Peele cited the game as an inspiration, stating that "from the first moment I played Metal Gear Solid 2, I knew I was experiencing the work of an artist whose craft just hits different." Several critics have also drawn comparisons between Metal Gear Solid 2 and the Marvel Cinematic Universe film Captain America: The Winter Soldier (2014). Gameranx said the first half of The Winter Soldier "feels like probably the closest movie adaptation we've gotten to Metal Gear Solid 2" with similar elements including the "stealth, an evil group, CQC, and even the moral dilemma about sacrificing one's personal liberties for the feeling of security." Eye For Film also said the opening sequence "will no doubt be familiar to anyone who's ever played Metal Gear Solid 2".
