= Carla White =

American jazz singer (1951–2007)

- Born: Carla Ruth White; September 15, 1951; Oakland, California, U.S.
- Died: May 9, 2007 (aged 55) New York City
- Genres: Jazz
- Occupation: Singer
- Years active: 1980–2007
- Labels: Stash, Milestone, Evidence, Vartan, Jazz Cats, DIW, Bright Moon Records

Carla Ruth White (September 15, 1951 – May 9, 2007) was an American jazz vocalist.

== Biography ==
White was born in Oakland, California, and raised in Bellport, New York. Her father, Dwain, was also born in Oakland and worked as an airline pilot. Her mother, Rosa, was born in Indiana and served on several artistic foundation boards later in her life. Her parents divorced early in White's life, though when they divorced is unclear; her mother was married to physicist Frederick Ayer from 1966 until his death. White's siblings, Penny and Miles, predeceased her.

Though she began dancing at an early age, White decided to pursue jazz dance after a friend introduced her to jazz as a teenager. She began dancing and acting at the Northwestern University dance and drama camp over the course of two summers. She spent her final year of high school at the Interlochen Arts Academy in Michigan, where she studied theater. She moved to London in 1969 to attend Webber-Douglas Academy of Dramatic Art. She dropped out before finishing her degree to pursue singing; she then spent a short time traveling and busking through Europe and North Africa.

She returned to New York City and took music lessons intermittently during the 1970s with Lennie Tristano and Warne Marsh. In 1979 she met trumpeter Manny Duran, who became her mentor. They formed the White-Duran Band and recorded the album "Andruline" for Stash. White died from cancer on May 9, 2007, in New York.

== Personal life ==
White was the niece of Broadway costume designer Miles White.

== Discography ==
=== As leader/co-leader ===
Dates recorded	Title	Label	year released	Notes
March 21–22, 1983	Andruline	Stash	1984	Co-leader with Manny Duran (trumpet). Recorded with Ed Howard (bass), Peter Madsen (piano), and Taro Okamoto (drums).
December 20, 1985 April 25–27, 1986	Orient Express	Milestone	1987	Recorded with Peter Barshay (bass), Manny Duran (trumpet, "The Man with the Trumpet"), Ed Howard (bass), Tim Horner (drums), Jeremy Kahn (piano), and Peter Madsen (piano). Recorded "Orient Express" and "I'll Remember April" with Kahn and Barshay on December 20, 1985. White wrote the tracks "Orient Express" and "Snowbound."
April 4–6, 1988	Mood Swings	Milestone	1988	Recorded with Peter Madsen (piano), Phil Bowler (bass), Tim Horner (drums), Lew Tabackin (tenor saxophone, flute), and Joshua Breakstone (guitar).
September 4–5, 1991	Listen Here	Evidence	1995	Recorded with Lew Tabackin (tenor saxophone, alto flute), Peter Madsen (piano), Dean Johnson (Bass), Lewis Nash (drums). Madsen composed "Dream" using Langston Hughes's poetry.
October 29, 1994	In Mexico	Jazz Cat	2000	Recorded with Roberto Aymes (contrabass, musical direction), Fernando Toussaint (drums), and Luis Zepeda (piano).
April 21–22, 1995	" Live at Vartan Jazz".	Vartan Jazz	1998	Recorded with Jerry Hahn (guitar), Joe LaBarbera (drums), Mark Soskin (piano), and Harvie Swartz (bass). Liner notes mistakenly state that this album was recorded in 1996.
July 26–27, 1996	" The Sweetest Sounds."	DIW	2000	Recorded with Steve Berrios (percussion), Dean Johnson (bass), Peter Madsen (piano), Tom Rainey (drums), and Lew Tabackin (tenor saxophone). White wrote the track "But I Was Wrong."
September 8–9, 2001	" A Voice in the Night."	Bright Moon Records	2005	Recorded with John Hart (guitar), Dean Johnson (bass), Claudio Roditi (trumpet, flugelhorn), and Matt Wilson (drums). White wrote the track "Peace of Mind."

=== Other recordings ===
album	year	Notes
Metal Gear Solid 2: Sons of Liberty Original Soundtrack	2001	White featured the other credits track "Can't Say Goodbye to Yesterday," composed by Rika Muranaka. Recorded with Onaje Allan Gumbs (piano), Don Braden (saxophone), Robin Eubanks (trombone), Kenny Davis (bass), Eugene Jackson (drums), and the Felix Farrar Orchestra.
