= Tappi Iwase =

Japanese musical composer

Tappi Iwase 岩瀬 立飛
- Also known as: TAPPY
- Born: March 7, 1967 (age 59); Toyohashi, Aichi, Japan
- Genres: Video game music; Jazz
- Occupations: Composer; arranger; drummer
- Instrument: Drums
- Years active: 1991–present
- Formerly of: Konami Kukeiha Club
- Website: tappy.applet.jp

Tappi Iwase (岩瀬 立飛, Iwase Tappi), sometimes credited professionally as TAPPY, is a Japanese musical composer. He is best known for his contributions to the Metal Gear and Suikoden franchises.

Iwase studied music with Dick Grove at the Grove School of Music prior to its closure in 1991.

Iwase is credited with composing all of the music for Metal Gear Solid, with the exception of the ending theme "The Best Is Yet to Come", whereas the music for the cinematic scenes was composed by Gigi Meroni. This includes the well-known main theme to Metal Gear Solid, arrangements of which were subsequently used in Metal Gear Solid 2: Sons of Liberty and Metal Gear Solid 3: Snake Eater. The use of his theme song was discontinued from Metal Gear Solid 4: Guns of The Patriots onward due to allegations that its melodies were plagiarized from a classical piece by Russian composer Georgy Sviridov.
