= Rika Muranaka =

Japanese composer and music producer

Rika Muranaka 村中りか
- Genres: Jazz, R'n'B, hip hop
- Occupations: Musician, composer, producer
- Instruments: Piano, keyboard

Rika Muranaka is a Japanese composer and music producer renowned for her songs in Konami’s Metal Gear video game series.

Some of her most notable works include "The Best Is Yet to Come" (Metal Gear Solid), "Can't Say Goodbye to Yesterday" (Metal Gear Solid 2: Sons of Liberty), and "Don't Be Afraid" (Metal Gear Solid 3: Snake Eater). She also composed the song "I Am the Wind" for Castlevania: Symphony of the Night and the song "Esperándote" for the original Silent Hill.

In May 2020, Muranaka was featured in the Visual Collaborative Polaris catalog. In a series titled TwentyEightyFour released during the peak of the COVID-19 pandemic, she spoke about her collaborations and virtual reality. Les Nubians, Dakore Akande appeared in the same interview periodical.

== Music career ==
During her teens, Rika Muranaka left her native Tokyo to study jazz piano with Alan Swain, a jazz pianist and author, in Chicago. She started to write music at the age of 16, but at first was doing it only for herself.

After graduating from Maine East High School in Park Ridge in 1979 and then Chicago's Northeastern Illinois University, Rika Muranaka returned to Japan and was offered a deal with Columbia Records, a major record company in Japan, in 1992, which resulted in the release of 4 albums. Her debut CD Slice of Life, released in 1992, featured vocalists Dwight Dukes, Cynthia Harrell and Stephanie B and was result of collaboration with Michael Caruso, a Grammy-nominated songwriter. She continued writing music and composed music for commercials, advertising, the Japanese government and demos for multimedia companies in Japan; she “was on TV, doing everything from jingles to writing music for artists.” Rika Muranaka had even worked developing pre-programmed beats and sounds for Casio electronic keyboards and produced music for educational textbooks and materials.

Fascinated by the game industry, Rika Muranaka started to work for Konami in the 1990s, though at the time it was a rare occurrence for game companies to hire professional music composers. Her motivation to write music for the game industry was “to change the standard for music in the industry” because “everyone thought that video game music was simple and not so good”. Her first projects at Konami involved songs for Castlevania: Symphony of the Night and the classic horror game Silent Hill, where she collaborated with Akira Yamaoka, a Japanese video game composer.

Her work at Konami led to an almost 20-year working relationship with Hideo Kojima on the Metal Gear Solid game series. The company was small at the time and the team creating the game was very small consisting from only about 20 people and they did not expect Metal Gear Solid to become so successful. Reflecting on her work dynamics on Metal Gear Solid series, Rika Muranaka states that she had to be a “mind reader” as she did not know the story line or where the music was intended to be used and had to imagine what Hideo Kojima had envisioned. She was only told by Hideo Kojima that she needed to create, e.g., 5 patterns for action, 5 patterns for sneaking and 5 patterns for ambient music. She also revealed that, when working on Metal Gear Solid, Hideo Kojima did not wish to hear any songs in English or any other language he would understand. When she suggested writing a song in Gaelic, Hideo responded: “What the hell is Gaelic?”

While working on Metal Gear Solid 2, Rika Muranaka brought in British film composer Harry Gregson-Williams into the game industry to work on the game series. She believes by doing so she has contributed to setting the trend of attracting film producers to the music composition in game industry.

During the years of her work at Konami she had not only composed music and written lyrics for some of the most popular songs that featured in the games, but also produced and edited music, arranged budget, hired the musicians and orchestra needed to produce the music for Metal Gear Solid game series. She involved jazz musicians, such as Gerald Albright, Kevin Eubanks and Hubert Laws, in creating music for the game series.

Despite being fond of writing for games, Rika Muranaka gradually developed passion to writing music for films, television and animation. She describes the process of creating music for game and film industry as different. She explains that “in games, the music has to fit within a game, meaning you have to make a transition every 30 seconds and it has to be loopable so they can cut or stretch the audio to sync to the game visuals. For film, you actually have a trailer or something to work with, meaning you can use a time code to fit the music perfectly within a scene so you have an advantage of having a scene front of you to write with.”

After terminating her work relationship with Konami, Rika Muranaka transitioned to working on her own projects, such as a reality show Hollywood Dream and her own business RnD Entertainment, both being a collaboration with Grammy and American Music Award winning music producer Damien “E-Love” Matthias, and composing and producing music for films.

== Works ==
| Year | Title | Notes |
|---|---|---|
| 2015 | Board to Death, Short Film Soundtrack | Music by Rika Muranaka and Dammie Akinmola |
| 2014 | Metal Gear Solid V: Ground Zeroes Original Soundtrack | Music produced by Rika Muranaka |
| 2013 | Polypore, Official Film Soundtrack | Assistant location scout, translation assistant for Japanese |
| 2013 | Property Wars: Season 2, Episode 17 "The Roof Is on Fire" | “Cosmic Mudra” Music by Rika Muranaka Produced by Rika Muranaka |
| 2012 | America's Next Top Model: Season 18, Episode 9 "Barney Cheng" | “Cosmic Mudra” Music by Rika Muranaka Produced by Rika Muranaka |
| 2012 | NFL In Their Own Words: Junior Seau | “Cosmic Mudra” Music by Rika Muranaka Produced by Rika Muranaka |
| 2009 | Blunts and Stunts: Class of ’94 | Produced and edited by Rika Muranaka Music by Rika Muranaka |
| 2008 | Metal Gear Solid 4: Guns of the Patriots Original Soundtrack | Music produced by Rika Muranaka |
| 2008 | Super Smash Bros. Brawl | “Snake Eater” Produced and arranged by Rika Muranaka |
| 2007 | Metal Gear Saga | “The Best Is Yet To Come” Music and lyrics by Rika Muranaka Produced by Rika Muranaka |
| 2007 | Broken English Original Film Soundtrack | “Cosmic Mudra” Music by Rika Muranaka Produced by Rika Muranaka |
| 2007 | LA Ink: Season 1, Episode 1 "Welcome Home, Kat" | "LA Ink-Cues" Music by Rika Muranaka Produced by Rika Muranaka |
| 2007 | MTV Rob and Big: Season 2, Episode 4: "New Assistant" | “Cosmic Mudra” Music by Rika Muranaka Produced by Rika Muranaka |
| 2006 | Dreamers, MTV Japan | Music and content produced by Rika Muranaka |
| 2004 | Metal Gear Solid 3: Snake Eater Original Soundtrack | “Snake Eater” Music by Norihiko Hibino Produced and arranged by Rika Muranaka “Don't Be Afraid” Music and lyrics by Rika Muranaka Produced by Rika Muranaka Vocals by Elise Fiorillo |
| 2004 | Metal Gear Solid: The Twin Snakes | “The Best Is Yet to Come” Music and lyrics by Rika Muranaka Produced by Rika Muranaka Vocals by Aoife |
| 2001 | Metal Gear Solid 2: Sons of Liberty Original Soundtrack | “Can't Say Goodbye to Yesterday” Music and lyrics by Rika Muranaka Produced by Rika Muranaka |
| 1999 | Silent Hill Original Soundtrack | “Esperándote (¿Qué Quieres De Mí?)” Music by Rika Muranaka Produced by Rika Muranaka |
| 1998 | Metal Gear Solid Original Game Soundtrack | “The Best Is Yet to Come” Music by Rika Muranaka Vocals by Aoife Ní Fhearraigh Produced by Rika Muranaka |
| 1997 | Castlevania: Symphony of the Night Original Soundtrack | “I Am the Wind” Music by Rika Muranaka and Jeff Lorber Lyrics by Tony Haynes Vocals by Cynthia Harrell Produced by Rika Muranaka |
| 1997 | Master Mosquiton: Anime Soundtrack | “Reminisce a While” Music by Rika Muranaka Lyrics by Tony Haynes Produced by Rika Muranaka |
| 1997 | Let's play U can chat too! | Interactive CD-ROM software Music and script directed and produced by Rika Muranaka |
| 1997 | My first day of school! | Interactive CD-ROM software Music and script directed and produced by Rika Muranaka |
| 1997 | My first trip to NY city! | Interactive CD-ROM software Music and script directed and produced by Rika Muranaka |
| 1996 | Love Letters to Heaven | Piano solo album Piano - Rika Muranaka Saxophone - Gerald Albright Guitar - Paul Jackson Jr. |
| 1996 | Summer of ’79 | Piano solo album Piano - Rika Muranaka Saxophone - Gerald Albright Guitar - Paul Jackson Jr. |
| 1996 | Enchante | Piano solo album Piano - Rika Muranaka Saxophone - Gerald Albright Guitar - Paul Jackson Jr. |
| 1995 | Furano | Multimedia CD-ROM interactive software Music by Rika Muranaka Produced by Rika Muranaka |
| 1992 | Slice of Life | Music by Rika Muranaka Produced by Rika Muranaka |
