= Warrior Nun =

American media franchise

- Created by: Ben Dunn (comics); Simon Barry (television/film)
- Original work: Warrior Nun Areala
- Owners: Antarctic Press (comics); Netflix (television); TBA (film)
- Years: 1994–2006 (comics); 2020–present (television/film)

Print publications
- Comics: Warrior Nun Areala (1993–2003); Warrior Nun Areala vs. Razor (1995–2000); Avengelyne/Warrior Nun Areala (1996); Warrior Nun Areala/Glory (1997); Warrior Nun Dei (1997); The Crimson Nun (1997); Warrior Nun Areala and Glory (1997); Areala: Angel of War (1998–1999); Warrior Nun Brigantia (2000); Warrior Nun Lazarus (2006)

Films and television
- Film(s): Warrior Nun Ava (TBA)
- Television series: Warrior Nun (2020–2022)
- Animated series: Warrior Nun Areala (2001)

Warrior Nun is an American media franchise consisting of comic books and a fantasy action-drama television series which follow the members of the Order of the Cruciform Sword, a fictional military order of Warrior Nuns and Magic Priests in the service of the Catholic Church. Created by Ben Dunn, the comic book series was published by Antarctic Press.

The first season of Warrior Nun, developed by Simon Barry with executive producers Stephen Hegyes and Dean English, was released in July 2020, with an ensemble cast led by Alba Baptista, Lorena Andrea, Kristina Tonteri-Young, and Tristán Ulloa. A second season, with William Miller, was released in November 2022. The franchise is set to continue with a live-action film trilogy from Barry, with Baptista reprising her role. However, in April 2025, over a year and a half later, creator Simon Barry shared a "candid update" in which he stated that the company that owned the movie rights had done nothing and that he was not sure that the company even existed anymore due to the death of its CEO and reports of the company mismanaging funds.

== Origin ==
The Warrior Nun television and film franchise is based on the comic series Warrior Nun Areala, which was originally published by Antarctic Press from March 1993 to July 2003. Several spin-offs of the series were published by Antarctic during the latter run: Warrior Nun Dei (1997), The Crimson Nun (1997), Warrior Nun Areala and Glory (1997), Areala: Angel of War (1998–1999), Warrior Nun Brigantia (2000), Warrior Nun Lazarus (2006) The series was created by Ben Dunn. Following the launch of the television adaptation for Netflix by Simon Barry, all volumes were republished to promote the series.

== Television series ==
=== Warrior Nun Areala pilot (2001) ===
In 1994, Ben Dunn and Antarctic Press attempted to produce a fan-funded Warrior Nun Areala American anime series, with contributors donating $125 in exchange for their names in the credits, only for Sunrise, the hoped-for animation studio, to require about $200,000 to make the series. In 2001, Darkain Arts made another attempt, producing a television pilot, though that pitch too failed. Only the opening credits of the series' pilot, created by the animators of X-Men: The Animated Series, have been made publicly available, released to YouTube.

=== Warrior Nun (2020–2022) ===
In September 2018, Netflix approved a television adaptation of the comic book series, with a series order for a first season. The series was created by Simon Barry, who is credited as an executive producer alongside Stephen Hegyes and Dean English.

It stars Alba Baptista as Ava Silva, a new character invented for the series. The series also features re-imagined versions of the characters from the comic book—Shotgun Mary (Toya Turner), Lilith (Lorena Andrea), Mother Superion (Sylvia De Fanti), Areala (Guiomar Alonso) and Sister Shannon Masters (Melina Matthews). The main antagonist of the first season is Jillian Salvius (Thekla Reuten), a female version of the character Julian Salvius from the comic book. The series debuted its first season in full on July 2, 2020. A second series was released in November 2022.

== Film series ==
Warrior Nun Areala was being adapted into a feature film to be directed by A. J. Annila. The film was to take all the main characters and mythology that author Ben Dunn provided and re-imagine it in a modern setting. Dunn's involvement included doing storyboards for the film as well as designing the opening sequence which was to blend animation and live-action. Perfect Circle Productions has been developing the film and the official website can be found at WarriorNun.com.

In October 2015, there were talks of a live-action Warrior Nun movie from Perfect Circle Productions, intended to be the first of a trilogy. The film was put on hiatus in 2018 when Netflix acquired the television rights.

=== Warrior Nun Ava ===
On December 13, 2022, Warrior Nun creator Simon Barry revealed on Twitter that Netflix would not be renewing the television series for a third season. Fans responded on social media, with many seeing the decision as part of a trend of discontinuing female-led shows with queer representation, known colloquially as the trope "Cancel Your Gays". On June 28, 2023, the series had been revived in another format without Netflix, crediting the fan support in helping making it happen. and discussions were taking place with other outlets for a revival in the form of a standalone film or a shortended final season. On August 15, 2023, executive producer Dean English confirmed that the storyline of the series would continue in a trilogy of feature films, intended to be expanded into a multimedia "cinematic universe" based on the original comic books. In April 2025, Barry shared an update in which he stated that he does not know the current status of the movie trilogy.

== Production ==
=== Development ===
The creation of Warrior Areala was inspired by the martial arts pursuits of the nuns of Fraternité Notre-Dame, or the Fraternity of Our Lady, a traditionalist Catholic organization. In 1991, a chapter was established in New York City's East Harlem to found a soup kitchen. It was in New York that Sister Marie Chantel, who had been a black belt in judo, learned taekwondo under a Hell's Kitchen martial arts master. Her fellow nuns, including the mother superior, also learned self-defense, hearing that the neighborhoods were dangerous, though they insist that their martial arts training is mostly for sport and that they have had no problems with the surrounding neighborhoods. Their story was picked up and reported by The New York Times.

Ben Dunn, who attended Catholic schools, was inspired by The New York Times article. In an interview, he said: "Other superheroes, you never know what their faith is. Batman or Spider-Man or Superman, they do all these great things, but what do they believe in?" His interest in understanding the impacts of religious affiliations on fictional superhero characters led him to write Warrior Nun Areala from this unique perspective. However, Ben Dunn does not consider the story a Christian comic book, as it avoids directly calling readers to repentance or propagating the faith. Rather, the series makes use of Christian imagery and Christian-based speculative fiction.

Part of this was due to the power Ben Dunn sees the Vatican as possessing. At one point, he wrote that it may not speak of itself as being a world power, but it is. That is because, despite being the smallest country on Earth, the Vatican's influence on world affairs is disproportionately large by its moral and spiritual authority as the headquarters of Earth's largest religion. With over a billion adherents, a headquarters that is a sovereign nation, a leader that is a world leader, it is a force in the world. Thus, it was only a small step to grant the (fictionalized) church a military force that would serve as Heaven's proxy if demons were to attack. In further explaining the concept, he added: "If Hell were an actual physical place with physical manifestations, then they would be subject to some of the physical laws of nature would they not? Of course, that would mean Heaven too would be a physical place. While this may not be so in our world it certainly is so in WNA's world. Therefore, things would progress differently. To the Vatican in WNA's world, 'thou shalt kick Satan's ass!'". However, in creating the character, Dunn sought to distinguish Areala from scantily clad bad girl antiheroines with which she might be confused. He was also desirous of creating a true hero, not an anti-hero: "I made it a very strong point that she doesn't kill people, only demons... She believes everybody – no matter how bad they've been – can be saved".

On September 28, 2018, it was announced that Netflix had given the production of a Warrior Nun television series a series order for a first season consisting of ten episodes. Simon Barry was set to serve as showrunner for the series. Barry is also credited as an executive producer alongside Stephen Hegyes with Terri Hughes Burton serving as a co-executive producer for the series. Production companies involved with the series are Barry's Reality Distortion Field and Fresco Film Services. The series premiered on July 2, 2020. On August 19, 2020, Netflix renewed the series for a second season. On December 13, 2022, it has been announced that the series has been canceled after two seasons.

Sometime after the series order announcement, it was confirmed that Alba Baptista, Toya Turner, Tristan Ulloa, Thekla Reuten, Kristina Tonteri-Young, Lorena Andrea, and Emilio Sakraya would star in the series. On April 1, 2019, it was announced that Sylvia De Fanti had joined the cast as a series regular. On October 18, 2021, Meena Rayann, Jack Mullarkey and Richard Clothier joined the cast as recurring roles for the second season.

Filming for the first season took place on location of Andalusia (Spain), in the town of Antequera (where the headquarters of the Order of the Cruciform Sword is located) Marbella, Ronda, Málaga, and Sevilla, from March 11, 2019 to July 5, 2019. The El Tajo Gorge was featured in one of the scenes. Pre-production for the second season began in late May 2021 and filming began in late July 2021 in Madrid, Spain. Production for the second season wrapped up on November 4 in Spain. On June 17, 2020, Netflix released the official trailer for the series, and the first season was released on July 2, 2020. The second season was released on November 10, 2022.

=== Controversy ===
In his review for Daisuke Moriyama's similarly themed anime/manga Chrono Crusade, manga critic Mike Toole likens such ideas to "the old standby of nuns with guns" and makes explicit comparisons between it and Dunn's comic book. Toole states that Dunn's idea of a "woman who slays monsters in a habit" is novel but that it "just doesn't make any goddamned sense". Quite differently, he writes that Moriyama is more restrained, and while his fully clothed heroine nun Rosette Christopher may be somewhat comical that she and her fellow characters "otherwise seem vaguely authentic".

Dunn made it a point to focus on escapist storytelling and after Antarctic Press' failed attempts at a "serious version" backfired this was reinforced. The man they chose for this was Barry Lyga, who wrote the second series. He wrote of that experience: "The original three series were very tongue-in-cheek... Unfortunately, the audience for the book liked the more tongue-in-cheek approach, and by mutual agreement, I left the series after six issues". Indeed, Lyga's willful decision to reject monster attacks out of hand and focus on "realism" led to less-than-successful issues that were never even completed.

Website Comicsutra states "that's what makes Warrior Nun Areala so special. At its core, it portrays people who have unshakable faith in God and their religion. ...Its affection for nuns is also evident—and sometimes returned. One real nun asked about Warrior Nun Areala noted that she and her colleagues give poor children college prep-level educations—that they are superheroes. Amen, sister".

==== Catholic criticism ====
Such sentiments also extend to members of the real Roman Catholic Church. Real priests and nuns sent their letters, alternately praising and condemning the series. In July–August 1997, the US Catholic League stated that "it does object to the comic strip characters that appear in the Warrior Nuns comic strip, a product of Antarctic Press". In another example Sister Mary Ann Walsh, a speaker for Washington, D.C.'s United States Conference of Catholic Bishops stated that Areala's costume is "offensive. The habit is something sacred". That is seen in early issues with how the upper half of the muscled, buxom Sister Shannon's ultra-low cut battle habit would show cleavage and/or show perpetually erect nipples through the cloth while the lower half consists of a loincloth, if that much in other Warrior Nuns. It was a seeming contradiction in terms with how a nun's habit is meant to hide the body in order to discourage lust. In fact, Ben Dunn wrote that the reason he did that was that "nipples sell". Regardless, Dunn stated the loincloth is "for mobility" and that is the official in-continuity explanation that the modest Sister Shannon herself unapologetically espoused when confronted on her seeming lack of modesty. This was resolved by having Sister Shannon's superior assign the Warrior Nuns new more modest battle habits that covered their breasts in the second series to replace the previous ones that she felt were "a bit too revealing!" Dunn himself ultimately did say that perhaps, "I think I did go a little overboard" in the earlier issues.

When Areala was accused of being a "bad girl" comic, Lyga countered that the second issue of his Areala series "had not a single punch thrown. When was the last time anyone saw a so-called 'bad girl' comic without a fight scene?" In fact, the same Sister Mary Ann Walsh, despite disliking Sister Shannon's battle habit, adds that the creation of Areala comes from someone with "a positive feeling toward sisters".

== Reception ==
=== Critical response ===
Critical response of Warrior Nun
Season	Rotten Tomatoes	Metacritic
1	68% (34 reviews)	62 (7 reviews)
2	100% (11 reviews)	62 (7 reviews)

== Music ==
Two CD singles were made for Warrior Nun, one by Pink Filth and Bad Habit's Monkeys on the Throne. Songs for Monkeys include,

- "Man Is a Threat (Beelze-Bug Theme)"
- "Lillith"
- "I'm Connected"
- "Satans Jester"
- "Eyes of the Innocent"
- "Incantation"
- "Warrior Nun"
- "Faith"
