= Warrior Nun Areala =

Comics character by Ben Dunn

- Warrior Nun Sister Shannon, surrounded by supporting cast members. From the cover of Warrior Nun Areala Volume 3 #1.

Publication information
- Publisher: Antarctic Press
- First appearance: Ninja High School #37 (March 1993)
- Created by: Ben Dunn

In-story information
- Alter ego: Sister Shannon Masters
- Species: Human

Warrior Nun Areala is a manga-style American comic book character created by Ben Dunn and published by Antarctic Press, first appearing in Ninja High School #37 in March 1993 as Shanna Masters.

The story later revolves around Sister Shannon Masters, a member of the Order of the Cruciform Sword, a fictional military order of Warrior Nuns and Magic Priests in the service of the Catholic Church. In the comic, the order was created in 1066, when a Valkyrie named Auria renounced her pagan ways and turned to Jesus Christ for salvation. Ever since then, Auria, now Areala, has chosen an avatar in every generation to carry on the mission. In modern times, this mission has grown into a global organization in the service of the Catholic Church, with the current Areala, Sister Shannon Masters, the best and brightest of all. With her friends beside her, Sister Shannon has led the forces of good against those of evil, ever serving the Lord with faith and humility. Appearing on and off for 20 years since her first appearance, Warrior Nun Areala is creator Ben Dunn's favorite character.

Over a series of storylines, Sister Shannon Masters' cast, powers, and trappings have gradually expanded, creating an entire society within the Church. There has been some controversy regarding the character of both religious and non-religious people: the former for appropriating Catholic imagery and the latter for how the comic book unapologetically shows the Catholic Church as a force for good. The franchise was expanded with a 2020–2022 television series and an in-development feature film trilogy continuation, both starring Alba Baptista.

== Publication history ==
=== Creation ===
The creation of Areala was inspired by the martial arts pursuits of the nuns of Fraternité Notre-Dame, or the Fraternity of Our Lady, a traditionalist Catholic organization. In 1991, a chapter was established in New York City's East Harlem to found a soup kitchen. It was in New York that Sister Marie Chantel, who had been a black belt in judo, learned taekwondo under a Hell's Kitchen martial arts master. Her fellow nuns, including the mother superior, also learned self-defense, hearing that the neighborhoods were dangerous, though they insist that their martial arts training is mostly for sport and that they have had no problems with the surrounding neighborhoods. Their story was picked up and reported by The New York Times.

Ben Dunn, who attended Catholic schools, was inspired by The New York Times article. In an interview, he said: "Other superheroes, you never know what their faith is. Batman or Spider-Man or Superman, they do all these great things, but what do they believe in?" His interest in understanding the impacts of religious affiliations on superhero characters led him to write Warrior Nun Areala from this unique perspective. However, Ben Dunn does not consider the story a Christian comic book, as it avoids directly calling readers to repentance or propagating the faith. Rather, the series makes use of Christian imagery and Christian-based speculative fiction.

Part of this was due to the power Ben Dunn sees the Vatican as possessing. At one point, he wrote that it may not speak of itself as being a world power, but it is. That is because, despite being the smallest country on Earth, the Vatican's influence on world affairs is disproportionately large by its moral and spiritual authority as the headquarters of Earth's largest religion. With over a billion adherents, a headquarters that is a sovereign nation, a leader that is a world leader, it is a force in the world. Thus, it was only a small step to grant the (fictionalized) church a military force that would serve as Heaven's proxy if demons were to attack. In further explaining the concept, he added: "If Hell were an actual physical place with physical manifestations, then they would be subject to some of the physical laws of nature would they not? Of course, that would mean Heaven too would be a physical place. While this may not be so in our world it certainly is so in WNA's world. Therefore, things would progress differently. To the Vatican in WNA's world, 'thou shalt kick Satan's ass!'". However, in creating the character, Dunn sought to distinguish Areala from scantily clad bad girl antiheroines with which she might be confused. He was also desirous of creating a true hero, not an anti-hero: "I made it a very strong point that she doesn't kill people, only demons... She believes everybody – no matter how bad they've been – can be saved".

=== Publication ===
The first appearance of the character Sister Shannon Masters was in Warrior Nun Areala Vol. 1, #1. Beginning in December 1994 and ending in April 1995, a three-issue limited series established the fictional world of Areala, several key characters, and her origin story. She was shown having just completed her training in a time when there had been no demonic activity for years, and the Warrior Nuns were in danger of being disbanded. Despite her lack of experience, she was assigned to fulfill a mission in New York City where Satan's minions of Earth were planning an assault on Heaven. She successfully foiled their plans.

This was then followed by other Warrior Nun Areala mini-series, some written by Ben Dunn and some not, such as Rituals (1995–1996), Scorpio Rose (1996–1997), and Warrior Nun Areala Vol. 2. Published every two months, they expanded the world and provided more information and depth concerning the characters. There were also one-shots such as crossovers with heroines of other companies such as Glory and Avengelyne. At the time there were other mini-series set in the Warrior Nun Areala universe that were not directly related to Sister Shannon Masters but instead widened the scope of the fictional world. Focusing on other Nuns of her order from the past, present, and future; they include but are not limited to Crimson Nun (1997), Warrior Nun Frenzy (1998), and Warrior Nun Dei (1997–1999). There was also an ongoing anthology series, Warrior Nun Black and White that focused on the whole of the Warrior Nun universe.

It was not until 1999 that Sister Shannon gained her own series. The miniseries Areala: Angel of War which detailed the original Areala and Warrior Nun Areala: Resurrection led up to it. Running from 1999 to 2001, it was simply titled Warrior Nun Areala Vol. 3. It concerned an ongoing threat by Areala's most persistent foe, Helga, as she tried to destroy the Vatican itself in a battle that put to the test the promise that the gates of Hell would not prevail. Though the series ended with the death of Sister Shannon, she later returned and appeared in another series, Warrior Nun Areala Vol. 4. This was written mostly by Craig Babiar.

The current series is Warrior Nun Lazarus.

Sister Shannon will be appearing in an upcoming War of the Independents tie-in issue, centering on her and Sean Koury's Bounty Hunter character, as well as appearing in War of the Independents itself. She can be seen on the cover of issue one, as well as in the group shot at the end of the issue.

=== Third party publications ===
Ben Dunn sold the rights to Areala during the 2000s in order to fund his wife's operation. The media rights were picked up by Perfect Circle Productions, which then later sold them to Netflix. The comic book rights were picked up by another company and it is currently published by Avatar Press. Dunn stated that he does not regret the rights being sold, is glad that the character still appears in comics and appreciates that his name is in the credits of the latest movies and shows. However, in 2025 in a Facebook post he stated, "One of my biggest regrets in life was to have to sell the rights to WARRIOR NUN AREALA to Avatar Press otherwise I'd do a special anniversary comic."

== Sister Shannon Masters ==
Her story begins in 1066 when the original Sister Areala was met by the angel who would become her namesake. An American, Shannon Masters was born after 1959 and was orphaned at the age of four whereon she was left at the steps of the Our Lady of the Virgin Mary convent. She stayed there until she was adopted by the Yoma family of Japan. She lived in Japan with the Yomas until she was eleven years old, but, after showing exceptional academic and athletic abilities, she was chosen for the Silver Cross Program and was raised to be a Warrior Nun in Upper New York State's Saint Thomas Academy. Thus, her experience at the orphan school was more of a boarding school.

Growing up at the Saint Thomas Academy, she wrestled with feelings of self-worth over how she had been orphaned. However, she overcame those doubts and found a purpose for her life in her service to the Church as did her adopted sister, Sasuki Yoma of Japan. It was while she trained there under a young Mother Superion, then Sister Katherine, that she first met and befriended the future Sister Sarah, her best friend; Father David Crowe, her future love interest; and Shotgun Mary. It was at this time that she visited Quagmire High School, also called Ninja High School, though at the time she had yet to take her vows and was referred to simply as Shannon and not Sister Shannon. After this, she received final training from Mother Superion at Vatican City.

Though a rookie, Sister Shannon's training was completed, and she reported to the New York City archdiocese. There, she patrolled two sectors from her assigned parish, Saint Thomas Church in Manhattan on the grounds that she was assigned to an area where there had not been demonic activity since the Purge of 1985. Replacing Sisters Sanguine and Hannah, she soon saw a sustained surge in New York City's demonic activity after her arrival (a stock situation in comic books wherein the supervillains can appear only after a hero shows up). She soon received her calling from the first Sister Areala after she was nearly killed in a battle with minions of arms dealer Julius Salvius. On recognizing her as the Chosen One of that generation, the original Sister Areala gave Sister Shannon her name and awakened her latent power. It was made official when the Areala confirmed her as her avatar after a battle against the avatar of mad valkyrie Helga.

== Characters ==
Characters	Portrayed by	Television series	
Characters	Portrayed by	Season 1	Season 2
Characters	Portrayed by	2020	2022
Ava Silva Warrior Nun Ava	Alba Baptista	Main	Main
Sister Mary Shotgun Mary	Toya Turner	Main	
Sister Lilith The Demon Princess	Lorena Andrea	Main	Main
Sister Beatrice	Kristina Tonteri-Young	Main	Main
Father Vincent	Tristán Ulloa	Main	Main
Jillian Salvius	Thekla Reuten	Main	Main
Mother Superion	Sylvia De Fanti	Recurring	Main
Adriel	William Miller	Recurring	Main

== Controversy ==
In his review for Daisuke Moriyama's similarly themed anime/manga Chrono Crusade, manga critic Mike Toole likens such ideas to "the old standby of nuns with guns" and makes explicit comparisons between it and Dunn's comic book. Toole states that Dunn's idea of a "woman who slays monsters in a habit and... a bikini" is novel but that it "just doesn't make any goddamned sense". Quite differently, he writes that Moriyama is more restrained, and while his fully clothed heroine nun Rosette Christopher may be somewhat comical that she and her fellow characters "otherwise seem vaguely authentic".

Dunn made it a point to focus on escapist storytelling and after Antarctic Press' failed attempts at a "serious version" backfired this was reinforced. The man they chose for this was Barry Lyga, who wrote the second series. He wrote of that experience: "The original three series were very tongue-in-cheek... Unfortunately, the audience for the book liked the more tongue-in-cheek approach, and by mutual agreement, I left the series after six issues". Indeed, Lyga's willful decision to reject monster attacks out of hand and focus on "realism" led to less-than-successful issues that were never even completed.

Website Comicsutra states "that's what makes Warrior Nun Areala so special. At its core, it portrays people who have unshakable faith in God and their religion. ...Its affection for nuns is also evident—and sometimes returned. One real nun asked about Warrior Nun Areala noted that she and her colleagues give poor children college prep-level educations—that they are superheroes. Amen, sister".

=== Catholic criticism ===
Such sentiments also extend to members of the real Roman Catholic Church. Real priests and nuns sent their letters, alternately praising and condemning the series. In July–August 1997, the US Catholic League stated that "it does object to the comic strip characters that appear in the Warrior Nuns comic strip, a product of Antarctic Press". In another example Sister Mary Ann Walsh, a speaker for Washington, D.C.'s United States Conference of Catholic Bishops stated that Areala's costume is "offensive. The habit is something sacred". That is seen in early issues with how the upper half of the muscled, buxom Sister Shannon's ultra-low cut battle habit would show cleavage and/or show perpetually erect nipples through the cloth while the lower half consists of a loincloth, if that much in other Warrior Nuns. It was a seeming contradiction in terms with how a nun's habit is meant to hide the body in order to discourage lust. In fact, Ben Dunn wrote that the reason he did that was that "nipples sell". Regardless, Dunn stated the loincloth is "for mobility" and that is the official in-continuity explanation that the modest Sister Shannon herself unapologetically espoused when confronted on her seeming lack of modesty. This was resolved by having Sister Shannon's superior assign the Warrior Nuns new more modest battle habits that covered their breasts in the second series to replace the previous ones that she felt were "a bit too revealing!" Dunn himself ultimately did say that perhaps, "I think I did go a little overboard" in the earlier issues.

When Areala was accused of being a "bad girl" comic, Lyga countered that the second issue of his Areala series "had not a single punch thrown. When was the last time anyone saw a so-called 'bad girl' comic without a fight scene?" In fact, the same Sister Mary Ann Walsh, despite disliking Sister Shannon's battle habit, adds that the creation of Areala comes from someone with "a positive feeling toward sisters".

== Chronology ==
Series	Writer	Issues	Dates
Warrior Nun Areala: Series 1	Ben Dunn	#1–3	December 1994 – April 1995
Warrior Nun Areala: Rituals	Ben Dunn	#1–6	August 1995 – June 1996
Warrior Nun Areala: Scorpio Rose	Steve Englehart	#1–4	September 1996-March 1997
Warrior Nun Dei: Aftertime	Patrick Thornton	#1–3	January 1997 – March 1997
Warrior Nun: Black & White	Herb Malette	#1–21	February 1997 – July 1999
The Crimson Nun	Brian Farrens	#1–4	May 1997 – November 1997
Warrior Nun Areala: Series 2	Barry Lyga	#1–6	July 1997 – May 1998
Warrior Nun Areala and Glory	Ben Dunn	1	September 1997
Warrior Nun: Frenzy	Miljenko Horvatic	#1–2	January 1998 – June 1998
Areala: Angel of War	Jim Gelvin	#1–4	September 1998 – June 1999
Warrior Nun Areala: Resurrection	THE EYE; Jim Gelvin; Ben Dunn	#0–3	November 1998 – March 1999
Warrior Nun Areala: Series 3	Brian Farrens (issues #1–8); Chris Allen (issues #9–12); Nathan Lumm (issues #13–16); Anthony Zicari (issues #16–19)	1–19	July 1999 – February 2001
Warrior Nun Brigantia	Kevin Gunstone	#1–3	June 2000 – October 2000
Warrior Nun Areala: Ghosts of the Past	Anthony Zicari	#1–4	March 2001 – June 2001
Warrior Nun Areala: Dangerous Game	Anthony Zicari	#1–3	July 2001 – October 2001
Warrior Nun Areala: Series 4	Anthony Zicari	#1-19	October 2001 - July 2003
Warrior Nun: No Justice for Innocents	Gianluca Piredda; Chris Gugliotti	#1	April 2002

== In other media ==
=== Music ===
Two CD singles were made, one by Pink Filth and Bad Habit's Monkeys on the Throne. Songs for Monkeys include,

- "Man Is a Threat (Beelze-Bug Theme)"
- "Lillith"
- "I'm Connected"
- "Satans Jester"
- "Eyes of the Innocent"
- "Incantation"
- "Warrior Nun"
- "Faith"

=== Movie ===
Warrior Nun Areala was being adapted into a feature film to be directed by A. J. Annila. The film was to take all the main characters and mythology that author Ben Dunn provided and re-imagine it in a modern setting. Ben Dunn's involvement included doing storyboards for the film as well as designing the opening sequence which was to blend animation and live-action. Perfect Circle Productions has been developing the film and the official website can be found at WarriorNun.com.

In October 2015, there were talks of a live-action Warrior Nun movie from Perfect Circle Productions, intended to be the first of a trilogy. The film was put on hiatus in 2018 when Netflix acquired the television rights.

=== Animation ===
Like other Antarctic Press characters, action figures of most of the chief characters were made. In addition to the standard look, there was also an anime look based on a failed attempt by Ben Dunn and Antarctic Press to make a Warrior Nun Areala American anime in 1994. The anime would have been partially fan-funded, with contributors donating $125 in exchange for their names in the credits. However, this did not materialize, as Sunrise, the hoped-for animation studio, needed about $200,000 to make the series. In 2001, Darkain Arts made another attempt, though that too failed. The anime was never completed and only the opening credits are known to exist; they were created by the animators of the X-Men: The Animated Series. The opening credits can be seen on YouTube.

=== Television ===
Netflix approved a television adaptation of the comic book series, with a series order for a first season. The series was created by Simon Barry, who is credited as an executive producer alongside Stephen Hegyes and Dean English.

It stars Alba Baptista as Ava Silva, a new character invented for the series. The series also features re-imagined versions of the characters from the comic book—Shotgun Mary (Toya Turner), Lilith (Lorena Andrea), Mother Superion (Sylvia De Fanti), Areala (Guiomar Alonso) and Sister Shannon Masters (Melina Matthews). The main antagonist of the first season is Jillian Salvius (Thekla Reuten), a female version of the character Julian Salvius from the comic book.

The series debuted on July 2, 2020. A second series was released in November 2022.

== See also ==
- Antarctic Press has claimed that Warrior Nun Areala launched a mini-genre, with other comic books, manga, films, and television shows imitating its central conceit:
  - Avengelyne (Maximum Press)—Although she never served the Catholic Church in an official capacity as it had no anti-demonic program, she was befriended by Catholic priest Father Clifton and stayed with him at St. Augustine Church
  - The Inquisition from Magdalena (Top Cow Productions)
  - The Department of Inquisition and the Department of Foreign Affairs' milder AX from Trinity Blood (Kadokawa Shoten)
  - The Order of Magdela from Chrono Crusade (Kadokawa Shoten)
  - Iscariot XIII from Hellsing (Shōnen Gahōsha)
  - The Burial Agency from Tsukihime (Type-Moon)
  - Solomon from Witch Hunter Robin (Sunrise)
  - Rip-off Church from Black Lagoon (Monthly Sunday Gene-X)
  - Vampire Hunters' Association from Vampire Knight (Shojo Beat)
- Montague Summers—a real and very eccentric self-professed clerical monster hunter, who claimed to be a Catholic priest, though that claim is not substantiated and disputed by many
- Father Gabriele Amorth of the International Association of Exorcists— Rome's chief exorcist
