= David Hayter =

Canadian and American actor and screenwriter (born 1969)

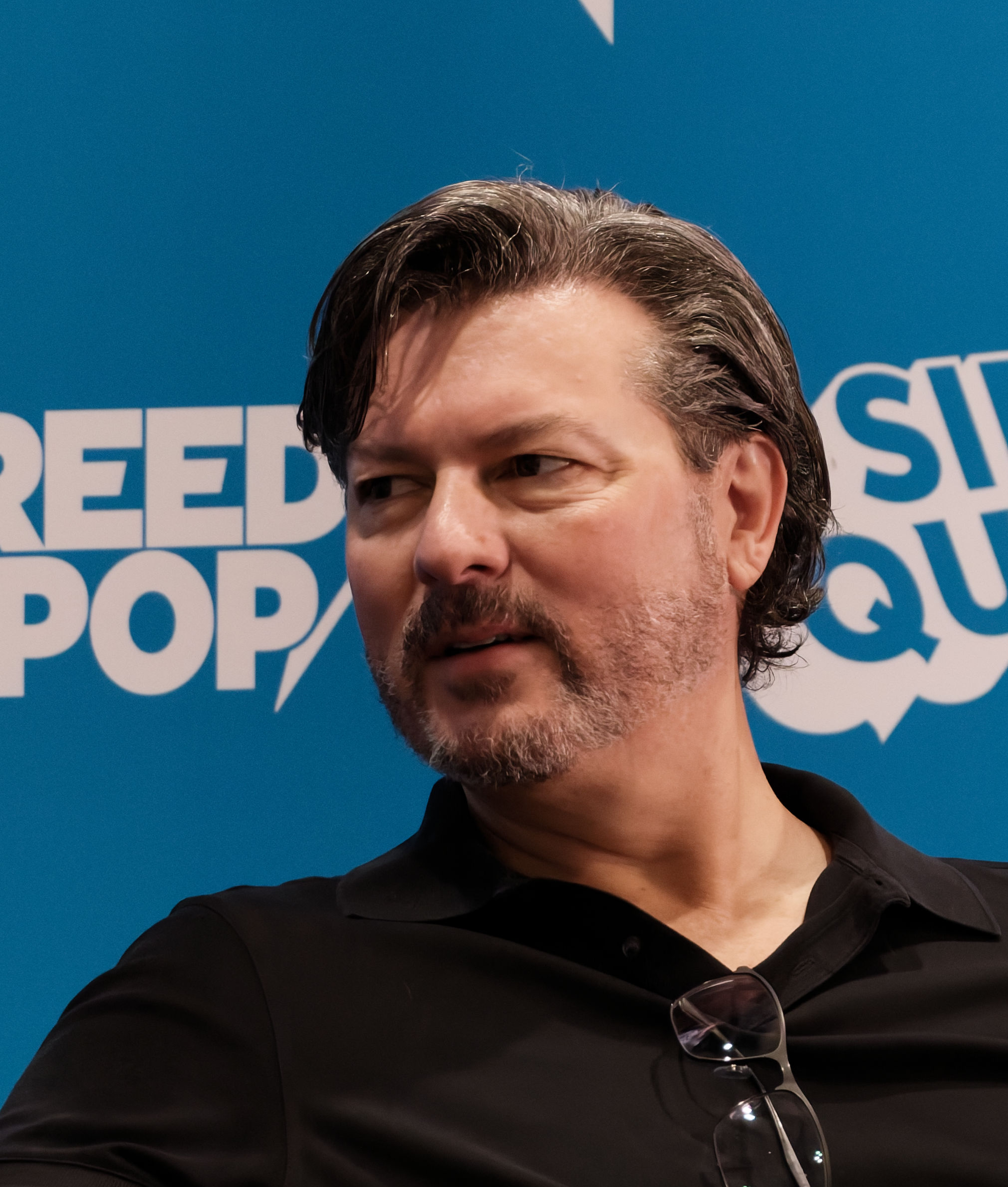
- Hayter at the 2026 Comic-Con
- Born: David Bryan Hayter; February 6, 1969 (age 57); Santa Monica, California, U.S.
- Education: Rensselaer Polytechnic Institute; Toronto Metropolitan University
- Occupations: Actor; screenwriter; producer; director
- Years active: 1993–present
- Children: Natasha Hayter

David Bryan Hayter (born February 6, 1969) is a Canadian-American actor, screenwriter, director, and producer. He is well known as the English-language voice actor for Solid Snake and Naked Snake in the Metal Gear video game series. He wrote the superhero film X-Men (2000), for which he won the Saturn Award for Best Writing. He also co-wrote The Scorpion King (2002), X-Men's first sequel, X2 (2003), and Watchmen (2009), and was a writer and producer on the streaming television series Warrior Nun.

His other roles include Sean Barker/The Guyver in Guyver: Dark Hero (1994), and King Shark on The Flash (2016–2019), and voiceover work in various video games. In 2014, he made his directorial debut with the action horror film Wolves.

== Early life ==
David Hayter started acting at the age of nine. His father, Stephen, worked in the pharmaceutical industry. He spent most of his childhood living around the world, and moved to Kobe at the age of 15. He once worked as a print model in Osaka. He later graduated from its international Canadian Academy in 1987. After this, he attended Rensselaer Polytechnic Institute for two years until transferring to the Toronto Metropolitan University in Toronto.

== Career ==
=== Early acting career ===
Hayter did some live acting in the early 1990s, most notably in an episode of the sitcom Major Dad, but soon became more interested in voice acting and later landed the role of Captain America in the popular 1994 Spider-Man animated series. He also provided the voice of Arsène Lupin III in the English version of the anime film The Castle of Cagliostro and the voice of Tamahome in the English version of the anime series Fushigi Yūgi. He also starred in the 1994, straight-to-video movie, Guyver: Dark Hero, as the protagonist, Sean Barker (a main role he took over from the previous actor, Jack Armstrong); Hayter has since gone-on to use the character's name as an alias in various work credits.

=== Metal Gear Solid series ===
Hayter began providing the English voice of Metal Gear series protagonist Solid Snake in the 1998 video game Metal Gear Solid, which also served as the series's transition from 2D to 3D. Hayter would go on to play Solid Snake and his progenitor Naked Snake throughout all the succeeding installments (including spinoffs, re-releases and adaptations) up to and including Metal Gear Solid: Peace Walker (2010). Hayter also has an extended live-action cameo as himself in one of the fictional TV programs prior to the start of Metal Gear Solid 4: Guns of the Patriots (2008); where he wears the "Solid Eye", the technologically advanced eye patch that the main character wears throughout the game. Outside the Metal Gear series, Hayter also voiced the character in Super Smash Bros. Brawl (2008).

His work with the Metal Gear series has also led Hayter to do voice work in other video game projects such as Eternal Darkness: Sanity's Requiem and Star Wars: The Old Republic. He cited the series as an influence on his screenwriting, stating that "Kojima and I have different styles," "but I've certainly learned things from him, especially about ambiguity and telling a story without giving all the answers."

Hayter is one of the few Metal Gear actors to have played and completed the games he's voiced in. According to Paul Eiding, Hayter gave up half of his own paycheck in order to bring back the cast of the original Metal Gear Solid for the 2004 remake Metal Gear Solid: The Twin Snakes.

Following the announcement of Metal Gear Solid V: The Phantom Pain in the 2013 Game Developers Conference, Hayter announced that he was not asked to reprise as the main character for this entry. This was later confirmed when Konami announced that Kiefer Sutherland would be the character's voice during E3 the same year. Hayter has since revealed in an interview that he had to re-audition for the role suggesting that the series' creator Hideo Kojima was already considering recasting the part much earlier, with Kurt Russell (Snake Plissken in Escape from New York and Escape from L.A.) having been allegedly offered the role during the development of Metal Gear Solid 3: Snake Eater (2004).

After Kojima's departure from Konami, Hayter would reprise the role in a Metal Gear Solid-themed advertisement for the 2016 Ford Focus SE aired in 2016. In 2018, Hayter provided the character's voice in two video games: Super Bomberman R (which added two playable characters based on both Solid Snake and Naked Snake in an update) and Super Smash Bros. Ultimate (which simply reused his performance from Brawl). He reprised his role as Naked Snake for the 2025 remake, Metal Gear Solid Δ: Snake Eater, which also includes newly recorded lines.

=== Filmmaking and TV show ===
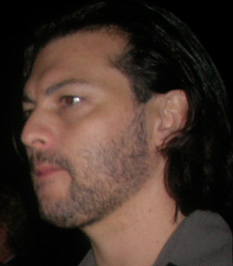
Hayter in 2006

In 2000, he wrote the screenplay for the movie version of X-Men, for which he was awarded the 2000 Saturn Award for Best Writing, and then went on to co-write the screenplay for its sequel X2 with writing team Michael Dougherty and Dan Harris. Shortly after his work on X-Men, Hayter was hired to write and direct a project based on the heroine Black Widow. However, due to the limited success of similar themed films featuring female vigilante protagonists at the time, Marvel withdrew their offer to Hayter stating, "We don't think it's time to do this movie". Hayter's daughter Natasha, born whilst he was writing the Black Widow script, is named after the titular character.

Hayter also wrote an adaptation of the graphic novel Watchmen by Alan Moore and David Gibbons. Noted for being a harsh critic of translations of his works to film, Moore said of the script "David Hayter's screenplay was as close as I could imagine anyone getting to [a film version of] Watchmen. That said, I shan't be going to see it. My book is a comic book. Not a movie, not a novel. A comic book. It's been made in a certain way, and designed to be read a certain way." Hayter and writer Alex Tse shared credit on the finished screenplay. Tse drew "the best elements" from two of the project's previous drafts written by Hayter. The script did not keep the contemporary atmosphere that Hayter created, but instead returned to the original Cold War setting of the Watchmen comic. Warner Bros. was amenable to the 1980s setting, and the director also added a title montage sequence to introduce the audience to the events of alternate history United States in that time period.

On September 7, 2012, it was announced that Hayter would pen the screen adaptation of Caught Stealing, starring Patrick Wilson and Alec Baldwin.

On September 13, 2012, Hayter began filming on his directorial debut, Wolves. On July 8, 2013, Hayter was hired by Lakeshore Entertainment to write the film The Sword, based on the Image Comics series.

On September 28, 2018, Hayter announced he was co-writing and producing the Netflix series Warrior Nun, based on the 1994 comic book series Warrior Nun Areala, with Simon Barry serving as series creator and showrunner. Season 1 debuted on Netflix on July 2, 2020.

=== Future projects ===
On August 7, 2013, it was announced Hayter was developing a television show on Fox tentatively titled World War III, about a fiction global conflict that chronicles "a perfect storm of world events places us in the center of a global battle which may bring the world as we know it to an end." Hayter will be writing the series' story bible and pilot episode, as well as producing and serving as showrunner.

On January 31, 2022, it was announced that Hayter would be writing and producing a television adaptation of the 2000 video game American McGee's Alice.

On March 11, 2025, Deadline Hollywood reported that TDE Films would produce along with Rob Friedman, the upcoming 20th Century Studios acquired action horror film The Zone, directed by Dallas Johnson, from an original script by Hayter.

On June 5, 2026, it was announced that Hayter would serve as co-writer (credited as "World Building Supervisor") on the video game Virtua Fighter Crossroads, his first writing role for a video game.

== Filmography ==
=== Anime (English dubbing) ===
Year	Title	Role	Notes
1994	Moldiver	Hiroshi Ozora	
1996	Rakusho! Hyper Doll	Reporter	as Sean Barker
1996	They Were Eleven	Doricas Soldam IV	as Sean Barker
1997	Street Fighter II V	Additional Voices	as Sean Barker (Animaze dub)
1997	Black Jack	Leslie Harris	as Sean Barker
1998–2000	Fushigi Yûgi	Tamahome / Taka Sukunami / Yoshui	as Sean Barker
1998	Giant Robo: The Animation	Shoji Gen	as Sean Barker
1998	Yu Yu Hakusho: The Movie	Kurama	as Sean Barker
1999	Mobile Suit Gundam 0080: War in the Pocket	Bernard Wiseman	as Sean Barker
2000	The Castle of Cagliostro	Arsène Lupin III	as Sean Barker (Manga dub)
2000–01	Dual! Parallel Trouble Adventure	Additional Voices	
2025	Record of Ragnarok	Leonidas	4 episodes

=== Animation ===
Year	Title	Role	Notes
1996–97	Spider-Man: The Animated Series	Captain America	TV series; 8 episodes
2006	Metal Gear Solid: Digital Graphic Novel	Solid Snake	
2013	Metal Gear Solid 2: Digital Graphic Novel	Solid Snake	Motion comic adaptation of the Metal Gear Solid 2 graphic novel included as extra content in Metal Gear Solid: The Legacy Collection

=== Video games ===
Year	Title	Role	Notes
1998	Metal Gear Solid	Solid Snake	English dub
2001	Metal Gear Solid 2: Sons of Liberty	Solid Snake / Iroquois Pliskin	English dub
2002	Eternal Darkness: Sanity's Requiem	Roman Legionnaire 1 / Roman Legionnaire 2 / Angkor Thom Guard	
2004	Metal Gear Solid: The Twin Snakes	Solid Snake	
2004	Metal Gear Solid 3: Snake Eater	Naked Snake	English dub
2005	Metal Gear Acid 2	Snake	English dub
2006	Metal Gear Solid: Portable Ops	Naked Snake	English dub
2008	Super Smash Bros. Brawl	Solid Snake	English dub
2008	Metal Gear Solid 4: Guns of the Patriots	Old Snake	English dub; Also has a live-action cameo playing himself.
2010	Metal Gear Solid: Peace Walker	Naked Snake	English dub
2011–	Star Wars: The Old Republic	Jedi Knight Male	
2013	Marvel Heroes	Winter Soldier	
2013–15	République	Daniel Zager	
2014	Oddworld: New 'n' Tasty!	Mudokons	
2015	Dragon Age: Inquisition – The Descent	Lieutenant Renn	
2016	The Long Dark	Jeremiah	
2016	Deponia Doomsday	Old Rufus	
2018	Super Bomberman R	Solid Snake Bomber / Naked Snake Bomber	English dub; Characters added in the Ver. 2.1 update patch, released on June 27, 2018
2018	Super Smash Bros. Ultimate	Solid Snake	English dub; re-uses voice work recorded for Super Smash Bros. Brawl
2019	Bloodstained: Ritual of the Night	Zangetsu, Narrator	
2020	Phantom: Covert Ops	General Nikolai Zhurov	
2020	Yakuza: Like a Dragon	Osamu Kashiwagi ("The Bartender")	English dub
2020	Super Bomberman R Online	Solid Snake Bomber / Naked Snake Bomber / Old Snake Bomber	English dub; Old Snake Bomber was added on May 27, 2021
2021	Retroninjacyberassassin	Doc Ninja	David recorded a few voice lines for Doc Ninja, the healer character, they were added in an update to the early access version.
2022	The Long Dark: WINTERMUTE	Jeremiah	David recorded lines for Jeremiah in Episode 2 of The Long Dark: WINTERMUTE
2023	Synapse	Colonel Peter Conrad	
2024	Like a Dragon: Infinite Wealth	Osamu Kashiwagi ("The Bartender"), additional voices	English dub
2025	Yakuza 0 Director's Cut	Osamu Kashiwagi	English dub
2025	Metal Gear Solid Delta: Snake Eater	Naked Snake	English dub; re-uses voice work recorded for Metal Gear Solid 3: Snake Eater although a handful of lines have been re-recorded with slightly altered dialogue.
2026	Yakuza Kiwami 3 & Dark Ties	Osamu Kashiwagi, additional voices	English dub
2026	Tom Clancy's Rainbow Six Siege X	Solid Snake	English dub
2027	Virtua Fighter Crossroads	Writer (World Building Supervisor)	Non-acting role

=== Live action ===
Year	Film	Director	Writer	Producer	Notes
1998	Burn	No	No	Yes	Unreleased on home media. Uploaded on David Hayter's YouTube channel on May 2, 2019.
2000	X-Men	No	Yes	No	
2002	Lost in Oz	No	Yes	Yes	TV movie
2002	The Scorpion King	No	Yes	No	
2003	X2	No	Yes	No	
2009	Watchmen	No	Yes	No	
2010	Chasm	Yes	Yes	No	Short film
2014	Wolves	Yes	Yes	No	Directorial debut
2015	A Christmas Horror Story	No	No	Executive	
2020	Warrior Nun	No	Yes	Supervising	2 episodes
TBA	Untitled Voltron live-action film	No	Yes	No	

==== Acting roles ====
Year	Film	Role	Notes
1993	Major Dad	Misha Sarotsky	Episode: "From Russia with Like"
1994	Guyver: Dark Hero	Sean Barker	
1994	Long Shadows	Ed's secretary	TV movie
1996	The Great War and the Shaping of the 20th Century	Voice	Episodes: "Stalemate" and "Total War"
1997	Drive	Cop #1	
1998	Burn	Tom Rice	
2000	Wild on the Set	Narrator	TV series
2000	X-Men	Museum Cop	
2014	Devil's Mile	Toby McTeague	
2016–2019	The Flash	King Shark	4 episodes Voice only
2022	Turning Red	Additional Voices	

=== Webshow ===
Year	Webshow	Role	Notes
2009	Hey Ash, Whatcha Playin'?		Episode: "The Sons of Big Boss"; Voice only
2017	The Jimquisition		Episode: "Slay to Pay"; Voice only
2018	Boundary Break	Solid Snake	Episode: "Metal Gear Solid"
2019	Khonjin House	Solid Snake	Episode: "Infiltrator 2"; Voice only
2022	Did You Know Gaming?	Narrator	Episode: "Metal Gear Solid's Cut Content"; Episode: "Metal Gear Solid's Insane Cut Content"; Voice only
