= Darkling (comics) =

Darkling, in comics, may refer to:

- Darkling, a Marvel Comics character better known as Asylum
- Darkling, a member of Archie Comics' Mighty Crusaders
- Darkling Lords, a group that appeared in Visionaries by Star Comics (an imprint of Marvel Comics)

== See also ==
- Darkling
