= Jogo Duplo =

2017 Portuguese TV series or program Lívia Mattar ferreira

- "Uma aposta de vida, ou de morte" (Portuguese) "A bet of life, or death" (English)
- Genre: Romance, Thriller, Comedy
- Created by: Artur Ribeiro
- Developed by: Plural Entertainment
- Directed by: Hugo de Sousa
- Starring: João Catarré; Sara Prata; Diogo Infante; Fernanda Serrano (see more)
- Opening theme: Bang by Ella Nor
- Ending theme: Bang by Ella Nor
- Country of origin: Portugal
- Original language: Portuguese
- No. of episodes: 267

Production
- Running time: 55min

Original release
- Network: TVI
- Release: December 4, 2017 – November 18, 2018

Related
- A Impostora; A Teia

Jogo Duplo (English: Double Game) is a Portuguese telenovela broadcast and produced by TVI. It was written by Artur Ribeiro. The telenovela premiered on December 4, 2017 and ended on November 18, 2018. It is recorded between Portugal (Setúbal and Alcácer do Sal), China (Macau) and Asia (Vietnam).

== Plot ==
The story of João and Margarida happens between Macao and Portugal. The young lovers were separated when they were teenagers and they find each other in Macao after many years. João has changed his life and he is now a rich mafia casino boss that, after the encounter with Margarida, decides to return to Portugal to reconquer her. Once at his native land, João finds himself in the midst of an ancestral setting in a region that is experiencing a conflict between urbanity, rurality and luxury tourism of the coast where the cohabitation is not always peaceful. However, all these conflicts will be eclipsed by a greater threat when Manuel Qiang, João's former boss in Macao, after losing the war with a rival triad, returns to Portugal determined to conquer a new business empire using unscrupulous illegal methods.

== Cast ==
- João Catarré - João Guerra (Protagonist)
- Sara Prata - Margarida Barbosa (Protagonist)
- Diogo Infante - Manuel Qiang (Antagonist)
- Fernanda Serrano - Maria João Barbosa (Protagonist)
- Afonso Pimentel - Rodrigo Sousa
- Alba Baptista - Leonor Neves
- Ana Lopes Gomes - Sónia Mateus
- Ana Varela - Diana Barbosa
- Anna Eremin - Cátia Sobral (Susanna's love interest)
- António Melo - Francisco «Ti Chico»
- Bárbara Branco - Sandra Duque
- Diana Costa e Silva - Laura Barbosa Guerreiro
- Duarte Gomes - Diogo Guerra
- Fernando Pires - Miguel Cássio
- Filipe Matos - Fernando Alves «Freddy»
- Graciano Dias - Tiago Venâncio
- Jani Zhao - Susana Wang
- João Brás - Joaquim Sequeira
- João de Brito - Sérgio Sarabando
- João Lagarto - Teodoro Guerra
- Liliana Brandão - Sílvia Cunha
- Luís Esparteiro - Vítor Duque
- Luís Ganito - Renato Nunes
- Luís Nascimento - Zhu
- Manuela Couto - Clara Neves
- Maria Emília Correia - Rosa Trindade
- Maria Hasse - Patrícia Dias
- Nuno Homem de Sá - Afonso Barbosa
- Paula Neves - Marta Monteiro
- Pompeu José - Telmo Carrapatoso
- Rodrigo Tomás - Alexandre Guerra
- Rui Mendes - Padre Sousa
- Sabri Lucas - Óscar Mourão
- Sandra Faleiro - Amália Reis
- Sandra Santos - Emília Venâncio
- Sara Barradas - Gabriela Nunes
- Sérgio Praia - Luís Humberto
- Sofia Arruda - Teresa Santos
- Sofia Grillo - Helena Duque
- Tiago Felizardo - Rafael Borges
- Vitor D’Andrade - Tomás Vaz Melo

== Reception ==
On January 9, 2018, an episode showed actresses Jani Zhao and Anna Eremin having a steamy lesbian sex affair. The broadcaster received a lot of praise and the scene was applauded by many viewers.
