= Cosmatos =

Cosmatos (Greek: Κοσμάτος) is a Greek surname. Notable people with the surname include:

- George P. Cosmatos (1941–2005), Greco-Italian film director and screenwriter
- Panos Cosmatos (born 1974), Greek-Canadian film director and screenwriter, son of George
