= Mandy (2018 film) =

Film by Panos Cosmatos

- Theatrical release poster
- Directed by: Panos Cosmatos
- Screenplay by: Panos Cosmatos; Aaron Stewart-Ahn
- Story by: Panos Cosmatos
- Produced by: Daniel Noah; Josh C. Waller; Elijah Wood; Casper Kelly; Adrian Politowski; Martin Metz; Nate Bolotin
- Starring: Nicolas Cage; Andrea Riseborough; Linus Roache; Ned Dennehy; Olwen Fouéré; Richard Brake; Bill Duke
- Cinematography: Benjamin Loeb
- Edited by: Brett W. Bachman
- Music by: Jóhann Jóhannsson
- Production companies: SpectreVision; Umedia; XYZ Films
- Distributed by: RLJE Films
- Release dates: January 19, 2018 (Sundance); September 13, 2018 (United States)
- Running time: 121 minutes
- Countries: Belgium; United States
- Language: English
- Budget: $6 million
- Box office: $1.8 million

Mandy is a 2018 surrealist action horror film directed by Panos Cosmatos, from a screenplay he co-wrote with Aaron Stewart-Ahn, and based on a story by Cosmatos. A co-production between Belgium and the United States, it stars Nicolas Cage, Andrea Riseborough, Linus Roache, Ned Dennehy, Olwen Fouéré, Richard Brake, and Bill Duke. The film follows Red Miller (Cage), a lumberjack seeking vengeance against cult leader Jeremiah Sand (Roache), as well as his devout followers, for the murder of the eponymous character and Red's girlfriend, Mandy Bloom (Riseborough).

Mandy premiered at the Sundance Film Festival on January 19, 2018, and was theatrically released in the United States on September 13, 2018. The film was a box office failure, grossing $1.8 million against its $6 million production budget. Despite this, it received critical acclaim, with particular praise for its visual style and originality, Cage's performance, Cosmatos's direction, and the action sequences. The film is widely considered a modern cult classic.

At the 45th Saturn Awards, the film won for Best Independent Film, while Nicolas Cage was nominated for Best Actor. Benjamin Loeb was nominated for Best Cinematography at the 34th Independent Spirit Awards. Mandy was one of the last films to be scored by composer Jóhann Jóhannsson, who died seven months before the film's release, and the film is dedicated to his memory.

== Plot ==
=== The Shadow Mountains ===
In 1983, in the Pacific Northwest, recovering alcoholic war veteran (former MACV-SOG unit) lumberjack Red Miller lives with his girlfriend, artist and author Mandy Bloom, who had an abusive childhood. Mandy works as a gas station cashier by day and at night creates elaborate fantasy art, which Red greatly admires.

While walking to work, Mandy catches the attention of Jeremiah Sand, leader of the religious cult Children of the New Dawn.

=== Children of the New Dawn ===
Sand orders his disciple Brother Swan to kidnap Mandy. Swan summons the Black Skulls, a cannibalistic, demonic biker gang that regularly consumes LSD.

After being offered a cult member as a sacrifice, the gang breaks into their home and subdues Mandy and Red. Cultists Mother Marlene and Sister Lucy drug Mandy with LSD eye drops and the venom of a giant wasp before presenting her to Sand. The cult leader attempts to seduce Mandy with his psychedelic folk music, but she just laughs at Sand, infuriating him. In retaliation, Sand stabs the bound and gagged Red and burns Mandy alive before him. After Sand and his followers leave, Red frees himself, mourns Mandy's death, and, after consuming a bottle of vodka, wordlessly swears revenge.

The next morning, Red visits his friend Caruthers to retrieve his crossbow and bolts. Before Red leaves, Caruthers warns him of the Black Skulls.

=== Mandy ===
Red reinforces his determination by forging a battle axe. He shoots a biker with his crossbow and runs him down, but the biker crashes his car and Red is captured in the process. At their hideout, Red breaks free from his restraints and kills the rest of the bikers. As he investigates their hideout, he ingests some of their drugs, causing him to instantly and severely hallucinate.

Following the images in his visions, Red finds The Chemist, the person who made the Black Skulls' LSD. After telepathically understanding what the cult did to Red and Mandy, the Chemist tells him where to find them. At their makeshift wooden church in a quarry, Red kills the cult members one by one in increasingly brutal fashion. In the tunnels beneath the church, Red finds Mother Marlene and decapitates her. He then confronts Sand, taunting him by throwing Marlene's severed head at him before crushing his skull. He sets Sand's body and the church on fire before driving away. As Red drives, he hallucinates Mandy smiling in the passenger seat of his car, while the landscape behind him now appears fantastical and otherworldly.

== Cast ==
- Nicolas Cage as Red Miller, a recovering alcoholic war veteran (former MACV-SOG unit) lumberjack whose girlfriend is targeted by a cult.
- Andrea Riseborough as Mandy Bloom, Red's girlfriend.
- Linus Roache as Jeremiah Sand, an egoistic cult leader who becomes obsessed with Mandy and kidnaps her.
- Bill Duke as Caruthers
- Richard Brake as The Chemist
- Ned Dennehy as Brother Swan
- Olwen Fouéré as Mother Marlene
- Hayley Saywell as Sis
- Line Pillet as Sister Lucy
- Clément Baronnet as Brother Klopek
- Alexis Julemont as Brother Hanker
- Stephan Fraser as Brother Lewis
- Ivailo Dimitrov as Skratch
- Kalin Kerin as Scabs
- Tamás Hagyuó as Fuck Pig
- Paul Painter as Cheddar Goblin

== Production ==
On June 7, 2017, Nicolas Cage was announced as the star of the film. Production used the Arri Alexa camera, coupled with the Panavision anamorphic format, to achieve the film's old-school atmosphere. The filming faced scheduling difficulties because Cage broke his ankle while working on another project, and cinematographer Benjamin Loeb joined the project only two weeks before principal photography began. Director Panos Cosmatos provided Loeb with various films as sources of visual inspiration to use for the film, including The Hitcher, Days of Thunder, Revenge, Psycho III, Fist of the North Star, and Cobra.

The forest scenes were shot in the High Fens in Belgium. The cabin that Red and Mandy live in was constructed by the crew on the site of an unused Boy Scout pavilion. The lairs of the Black Skulls and Children of the New Dawn made use of an abandoned house outside of Chaudfontaine. The chainsaw battle was shot in a quarry outside of Bévercé. The weapon forged by Red in the film was based on the "F" from the logo for extreme metal band Celtic Frost. The song "Starless" by the English progressive rock band King Crimson plays over the opening credits. It is taken from their 1974 album Red, which is also the name of Cage's character.

Legion M, an entertainment studio that allows fans to invest in and be part of the creation of films, was a production partner for Mandy and hosted a panel discussion featuring director Panos Cosmatos and others at the Sundance Film Festival in 2018. Cage made a surprise appearance at the event.

== Music ==
The soundtrack of Mandy was one of the last films scored by Jóhann Jóhannsson before his death. Some of the inspirations that Cosmatos provided for Jóhannsson were, Queen's soundtrack for Flash Gordon (1980) and Van Halen's album Fair Warning (1981). However, Jóhannsson's score did not reference any of them; the score comprises electronic and live instrumentation that was being heavily edited and processed for a "dark, massive, industrial-metal sound" that matched the violent tone of the film. The score featured Stephen O'Malley from Sunn O))) playing guitars. Randall Dunn served as the music producer and discussed with Jóhannsson on the use of specific analogue synthesizers. The team found a studio in Italy where most of the synth recordings were done.

Most of the film's score had been completed in time for the 2018 Sundance Film Festival premiere. Following Jóhannsson's death on February 9, 2018, the remainder of his cues were curated and produced by Pepijn Caudron and Yair Elazar Glotman. Caudron was initially hired as a music editor, but due to the slow post-production process, he also wrote a couple of cues mostly based on Jóhannsson's samples. According to Dunn, the music in the film and the soundtrack release were different. Dunn first heard the soundtrack and the film's music later and found that more material has been featured in the film while mixing. He felt the soundtrack to be a bonus material. The film was dedicated to Jóhannsson.

== Release ==
The film premiered at the 2018 Sundance Film Festival on January 19. It began a limited cinematic release on September 13, 2018, playing at a maximum of 250 theatres, and was released on VOD on September 13.

== Reception ==
=== Critical response ===
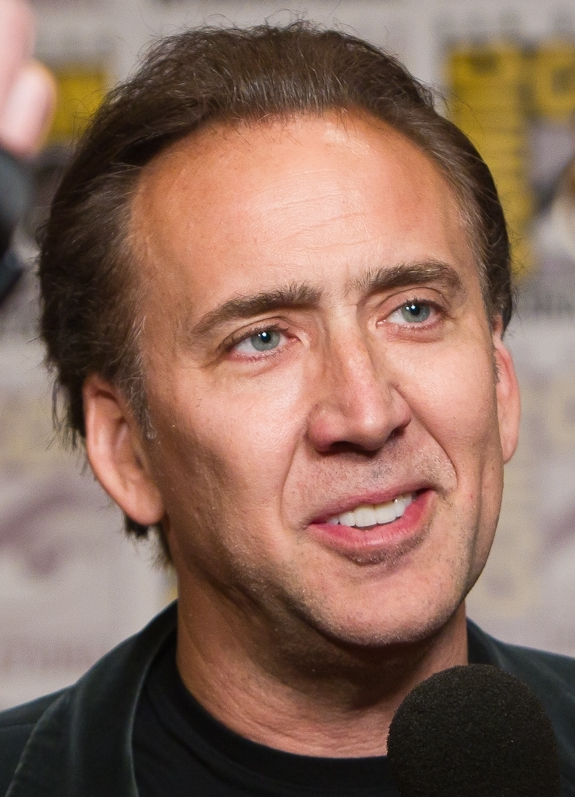
Nicolas Cage's performance garnered critical praise.

On review aggregator Rotten Tomatoes, 90% of critics have given the film a positive review based on 248 reviews, with an average rating of 7.6/10. The website's critics consensus reads, "Mandy's gonzo violence is fueled by a gripping performance by Nicolas Cage—and anchored with palpable emotion conveyed between his volcanic outbursts." On Metacritic, the film has a weighted average score of 83 out of 100 based on review from 30 critics, indicating "universal acclaim".

Reviewing the film after its world premiere at the Sundance Film Festival, Nick Allen of RogerEbert.com praised it, writing that "for all of the endless feral performances that Cage has given, in movies good, bad and forgettable, Cosmatos' style-driven, '80s-tastic passion for weird worlds and characters takes full advantage of Cage's greatness, and then some."

In a five-star review for Dirty Movies, Stephen Lee Naish called the film "a blood soaked revenge caper," praising Cosmatos for a "masterful approach" that "aligns him with Kubrick and Lynch in delivering perfectly believable and fully realized worlds and characters that operate within their own laws of physics." Meanwhile, film critic Christopher Stewardson said the film "is sure to become a cult favourite all of its own." In December 2018, Esquire named Mandy the top film in its 25 Best Movies of 2018 So Far.

=== Accolades ===
Award	Date of ceremony	Category	Recipients	Result	Ref.
Austin Film Critics Association Awards	January 7, 2019	Best Score	Jóhann Jóhannsson	Won	
Austin Film Critics Association Awards	January 7, 2019	Best Stunts	Mandy	Nominated	
Chicago Film Critics Association Awards	December 8, 2018	Best Original Score	Jóhann Jóhannsson	Nominated	
Detroit Film Critics Society Awards	December 3, 2018	Best Use of Music	Jóhann Jóhannsson	Nominated	
Dublin Film Critics' Circle Awards	December 20, 2018	Best Cinematography	Benjamin Loeb	5th place	
Dublin Film Critics' Circle Awards	December 20, 2018	Best Film	Mandy	10th place (Note: Tied with The Rider)	
Fangoria Chainsaw Awards	February 25, 2019	Best Actor	Nicolas Cage	Won	
Fangoria Chainsaw Awards	February 25, 2019	Best Director	Panos Cosmatos	Nominated	
Fangoria Chainsaw Awards	February 25, 2019	Best Limited Release	Mandy	Won	
Fangoria Chainsaw Awards	February 25, 2019	Best Makeup FX	Oriane de Neve	Nominated	
Fangoria Chainsaw Awards	February 25, 2019	Best Score	Jóhann Jóhannsson	Won	
Fangoria Chainsaw Awards	February 25, 2019	Best Supporting Actor	Linus Roache	Nominated	
Hollywood Music in Media Awards	November 14, 2018	Best Original Score — Independent Film	Jóhann Jóhannsson	Nominated	
Houston Film Critics Society Awards	January 3, 2019	Best Poster	Mandy	Nominated	
Independent Spirit Awards	February 23, 2019	Best Cinematography	Benjamin Loeb	Nominated	
Neuchâtel International Fantastic Film Festival	July 16, 2018	Narcisse Award for Best Feature Film	Mandy	Nominated	
Saturn Awards	September 13, 2019	Best Actor	Nicolas Cage	Nominated	
Saturn Awards	September 13, 2019	Best Independent Film	Mandy	Won	
Seattle Film Critics Society Awards	December 17, 2018	Best Original Score	Jóhann Jóhannsson	Won	
Sitges Film Festival	October 15, 2018	Best Director	Panos Cosmatos	Won	

== See also ==
- List of films featuring hallucinogens
