= Cees Geel =

Dutch actor (1965–2026)

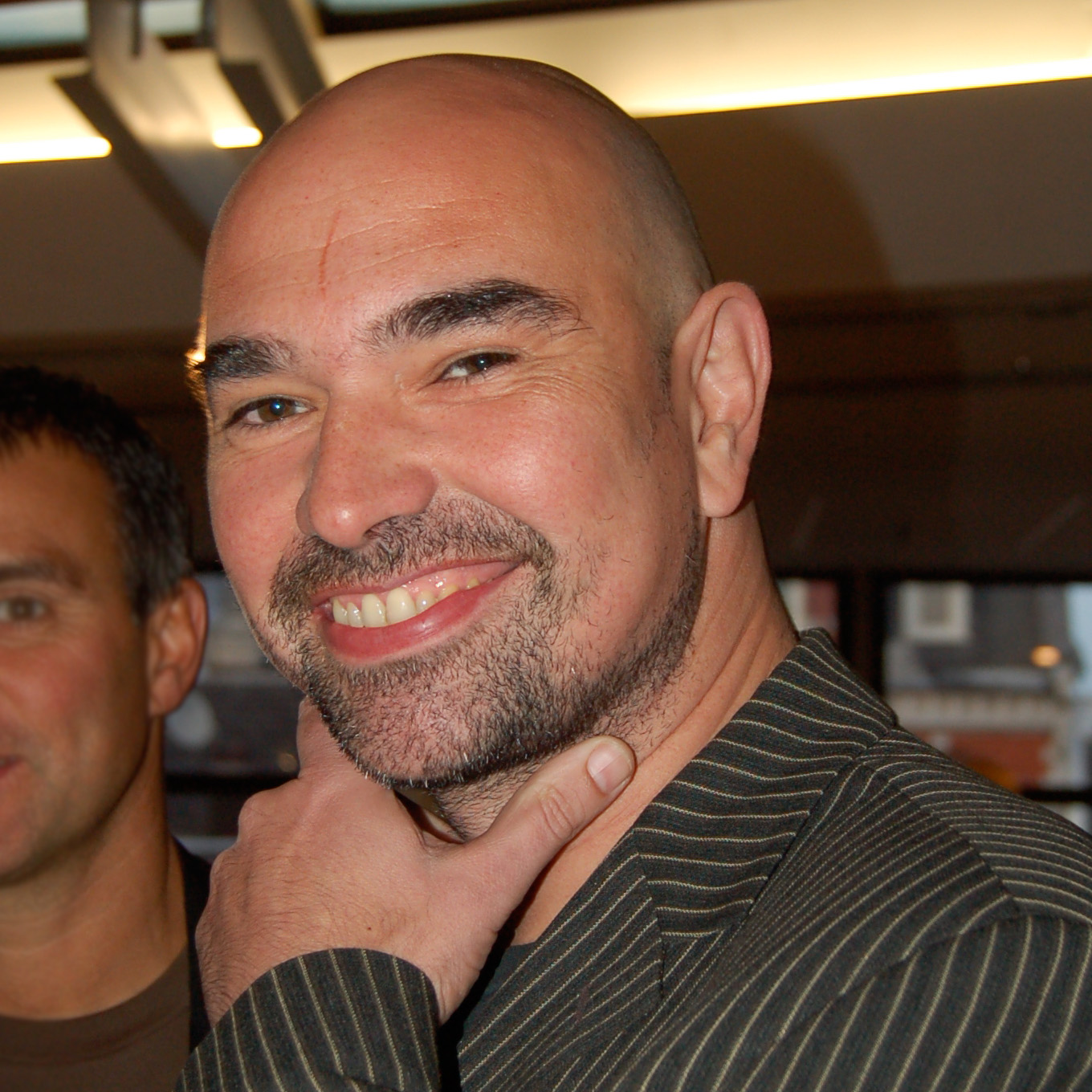
Geel in 2006

Cornelis Pieter "Cees" Geel (13 March 1965 – 14 July 2026) was a Dutch television, radio and film actor. His notable credits included in the television miniseries Anne Frank: The Whole Story (2001) and in the film Simon (2004). He won the Golden Calf for Best Actor award for his role in Simon.

Geel was born in Schagen on 13 March 1965. He died from a cardiac arrest on 14 July 2026, at the age of 61.

== Filmography ==
- Tate's Voyage (1998) as Theo 'Teetje' van Nierhof
- Unit 13 (1998-1999) as Toine
- The Black Meteor (2000) as Tonnie Hootweer
- Anne Frank: The Whole Story (2001; TV) as Willem Van Maaren
- Schiet mij maar lek (2002; TV series) as Karel
- Simon (2004) as Simon Cohen
- 06/05 (2004) as Politie-agent
- Medea (2005) as Bertje
- Too Fat Too Furious (2005) as Lars Meuleman
- Deuce Bigalow: European Gigolo (2005) as Man-Whore Union Doorman
- Samen (TV series; 2005–06) as Rogier Kuipers
- Het Woeden der Gehele Wereld (2006) as Joost Vroom
- Spoorloos verdwenen (2006; TV series episode "De verdwenen actrice") as Snaker
- Gooische vrouwen (2006; TV series episode "Regiseur") as Regiseur
- Adriaan (2007) as Vader Adriaan
- Van Speijk (2007; 3 episodes as Det. Koos Zwart)
- De Scheepsjongens van Bontekoe (2007) as Koopman
- Sextet (2007) as Wim
- Clean Hands (2015) as Brandsma
