= Tate's Voyage =

De Trip van Teetje
- Theatrical release poster
- Directed by: Paula van der Oest
- Written by: Paula van der Oest
- Starring: Cees Geel; Thekla Reuten; Dimitri Ivanov
- Cinematography: Brigit Hillenius
- Music by: Fons Merkies
- Production companies: Motel Films; VPRO
- Distributed by: RCV Film Distribution
- Release date: 12 February 1998
- Running time: 90 minutes
- Country: Netherlands
- Languages: Dutch, English, Russian

Tate's Voyage or De Trip van Teetje is a 1998 Dutch film directed by Paula van der Oest.

== Plot ==
Tate (Teetje) and his friends rob a jewelry store in the middle of the night. The guards catch them red handed, but they manage to escape with the loot, which consists mainly of Rolexes. It becomes clear that this type of criminality is a habit for Tate, but when he meets his girlfriend Mary, he promises her to 'quit the life'. In order to do so, he buys a Russian ship that is offered to him for €100,000 and was said to have electronics on board, worth at least two million. To be able to buy the ship, he borrows money from his friends with whom he did the robbery, thinking that he can easily pay them back shortly. After the purchase is complete, Tate visits the ship and finds out that there is a 30-man Russian crew on board, and only little food. He also finds out that along with the ship, he also bought a €200,000 debt to Yugoslavia and hence, the ship has been chained. On top of that, it turns out that the crew hasn't been paid any wages for the past three years, which is the time the Russian crew have been stuck on board the ship in the Rotterdam harbour.

As Tate is unable to pay his friends back, they threaten to kill him if he doesn't pay within a few days. He hides on board the ship, but the ship is running out of supplies, and more and more crew members are getting sick. When Tate's friends, unable to find Tate, threaten to hurt Mary, he brings her on board. As Mary is a nurse at the Catholic hospital of Rotterdam, she starts to treat the ill crew members. First mate Nikolaj falls in love with Mary and Mary finds out she has feelings for him, too. She later confesses that she gave up her virginity for him.

=== End plot ===
As the food runs out, Tate manages to persuade a local supermarket to donate 30 boxes of food. The crew however finds this not enough and threatens Tate to kill Mary if they do not return to Russia soon. Desperate as he is, Tate visits the captain of the ship in the hospital. The captain tells him that he should get rid of the cargo as soon as he can, as the cargo was shipped from Chernobyl nuclear power plant and thus is radioactive. Tate discovers that Mary and Nikolaj have an affair, returns to the ship, and gives Nikolaj his passport, cellphone and the key to his home. Nikolaj and Mary leave the ship, and Tate, so far unable to speak Russian, orders in Russian to prepare the ship and set sail for Russia. The film ends with the whole crew, including Tate, singing Russian sailor's songs.

== Cast ==
- Boris Abarov as Kapitein
- Cynthia Abma as Karin
- Abdenbi Azzaoui as Hassan
- Ron Christian Boom as Bewaker Ron
- Cilly Dartell as Verslaggeefster
- Nikolaj Dohorin as Nieuwe Rus
- Cees Geel as Theo 'Teetje' van Nierhof
- Herman Grootaers
- Dimitri Ivanov as Nikolaj
- István Jeney as Tolk
- Serge Latychav as Dirigent
- Louis Laurijssens
- Simon van Leeuwen as Middenstander
- Re Leonie as Moeder
- Peteris Liepins
- Ruud Louisse as Bewaker 2
- Jaap Maarleveld as Havenmeester
- Wolter Muller as Boris
- Albert Muske as Schilder
- Thekla Reuten as Mary
- Henk Strijbos as Douanebeambte
- Dimme Treurniet as Ger
- Piet van Velzen
- Fred Visser
- Leonid Vlasov as Machinist
- Wlad Vogtushenko
- Olej Yemelyanov as Koorlid
