= A Criação =

Portuguese comedy TV series

- Also known as: The Creation
- Portuguese: A Criação
- Genre: Comedy
- Created by: Pedro Bidarra
- Directed by: André Banza; Sérgio Graciano
- Starring: Alba Baptista; Bárbara Lourenço; Bruna Quintas; Diogo Mesquita; Gonçalo Carvalho; Mafalda Jara; Rita Tristão da Silva; Romeu Vala; Tomás Alves; Angel Tovar; Luís Lobão
- Country of origin: Portugal
- No. of seasons: 1
- No. of episodes: 10

Production
- Producers: Inês Tavares; Ricardo Freitas
- Production company: Até ao Fim do Mundo

Original release
- Network: RTP1
- Release: 19 September 2017

A Criação (English: The Creation) is a Portuguese television series produced by Até ao Fim do Mundo. It premiered on 19 September 2017.

It was the first television series to have all episodes released at the same time on RTP Play, a Netflix-style streaming service owned by Rádio e Televisão de Portugal.

== Plot ==
Each episode unfolds around a project, such as a movie, event, or public relations activity that the client is assigned by an advertising agency. Each episode depicts the production of the idea, including pseudo-rational choices and decisions that reduce it to a travesty. The absurdity is heightened by the fact that the employees are portrayed by actors in animal costumes.

Throughout the series, stories develop relationships between various characters: a romantic relationship between Bear and Chicken, Lion's ambition to climb the ranks, a secret romance between Giraffe and Rat, a classic relationship between Sheep and Shepherd, and Dog's attachment to guarding Sheep. In addition, the series shows the envy among creative professionals, who turn out to be "typical of an office full of stuffed animals."

== Cast ==
- Alba Baptista as Little Mouse
- Bárbara Lourenço as Woodcock
- Bruna Quintas as Little Robot
- Diogo Mesquita as Bear
- Gonçalo Carvalho as Little Lion
- Mafalda Jara as Giraffe
- Rita Tristão da Silva as Little Lamb
- Romeu Vala as Raven
- Tomás Alves as Dog
- Angel Tovar as Fox
- Luís Lobão as Shepherd

== Episodes ==
No.	Title	Original release date
1	"Sex and Pudding"	19 September 2017
The advertiser, supermarket, and the agency test an idea for selling pudding using a strangely normal focus group, while creatives work on a Plan B.
2	"Rough Blue"	26 September 2017
The agency orders a company, Credo Filmes, to produce a filmed advertisement. Efforts to prevent discomfort and honour the desires of those involved make the process increasingly absurd.
3	"The Mountain Spooked Rats"	3 October 2017
A big event is designed, budgeted and executed for the supermarket's white toilet paper brand.
4	"The Modernization of Chorizo"	10 October 2017
The Supermarket asks the agency to produce a campaign to modernize the chorizo, a traditional form of sausage. The agency thinks about Joana Vasconcelos, but Little Robot is very uncomfortable.
5	"A Foam Broker"	17 October 2017
Two creatives, the Dog and the Raven, disappear for two weeks to take a photograph of a spout filled with foam.
6	"The XXI Boy"	24 October 2017
It's Christmas. It is necessary to find a baby boy, for Jesus's Crib, who will portray inclusivity.
7	"Half Dose"	7 November 2017
The advertiser, the supermarket, wants to cut creation fees in half to meet its budget and address a crisis.
8	"Consensual Viral"	14 November 2017
Creation works on the design of a viral campaign. This episode features kittens, garden products and a lesson on viruses.
9	"An Episode with Gisele Bundchen"	21 November 2017
The viral campaign is presented, approved and produced. It's no easy task because it's hard to find and hire Gisele characters, but the episode is filled with celebrities and half-celebrities.
10	"The Great Bacon"	28 November 2017
It's the time of the festivals, and the community is celebrated. Everyone expects to win the largest amount of bacon, but the winner is the Deer agency. Rui Unas delivers the prizes. People and animals all end up in bed with one another.
