= Flesh of the Gods =

- Directed by: Panos Cosmatos
- Written by: Andrew Kevin Walker
- Story by: Panos Cosmatos; Andrew Kevin Walker
- Produced by: Adam McKay; Betsy Koch; Jonas Katzenstein; Maximilian Leo; Kristen Stewart; Maggie McLean
- Starring: Wagner Moura; Kristen Stewart; Esmé Creed-Miles; Roland Møller; Alba Baptista
- Production companies: Hyperobject Industries; augenschein Filmproduktion; Nevermind Pictures
- Distributed by: A24
- Countries: United States; Germany
- Language: English

Flesh of the Gods is an upcoming gothic supernatural horror thriller film directed by Panos Cosmatos and written by Andrew Kevin Walker. It stars Wagner Moura, Kristen Stewart, Esmé Creed-Miles, Roland Møller, and Alba Baptista.

== Premise ==
In 1980s Los Angeles, a married couple cross paths with an enigmatic vampire and are seduced into a surreal nightlife of hedonism, violence and thrills.

== Cast ==
- Wagner Moura as Raoul
- Kristen Stewart as Alex
- Esmé Creed-Miles
- Roland Møller
- Alba Baptista

== Production ==
=== Development ===
In May 2024, it was announced that a vampire thriller film directed by Panos Cosmatos and written by Andrew Kevin Walker was in development, with Oscar Isaac and Kristen Stewart cast in the lead roles. In May 2025, Elizabeth Olsen joined the cast. By December 2025, it was reported that the project was still looking for financing. In April 2026, Isaac exited the project due to scheduling conflicts, with Wagner Moura replacing him; A24 had acquired U.S. distribution rights to the film.

=== Filming ===
Principal photography began on May 12, 2026, in the Canary Islands and Cologne, when Esmé Creed-Miles, Roland Møller, and Alba Baptista joining the cast, with Creed-Miles replacing Olsen. After six weeks of shooting, production wrapped on June 22.
