= Asylum (comics) =

Cover of the first issue (December 1995)

Asylum was a comic book anthology series published by Rob Liefeld's Maximum Press, and featured several stories in each issue, including Tales of the Beanworld, Avengelyne and others. It ran for eleven issues from December 1995 to January 1997.
