= Avengelyne =

- Cover to Avengelyne #1 (1995)

Publication information
- Publisher: Maximum Press; Awesome Entertainment; Avatar Press; Arcana Studio; Image Comics
- First appearance: Avengelyne: Deadly Sins #1 (February 1995)
- Created by: Rob Liefeld; Cathy Christian; Tony Lobito

In-story information
- Species: Fallen angel
- Abilities: Super strength Magical blood

Avengelyne is a comic book character created by Rob Liefeld, Cathy Christian and Tony Lobito. Avengelyne is an angel who fights the forces of evil and often finds herself face-to-face with demons and monsters.

== Publication history ==
The original character design for Avengelyne was based on the likeness of former Vampirella model Cathy Christian. Originally published in 1995 by Maximum Press, she was also inspired by Ben Dunn's comic Warrior Nun Areala from Antarctic Press, the characters then featuring in two crossover series in 1996.

By the end of the 1990s, Avengelyne had been used in comics by Awesome Entertainment (only one issue published) and Avatar Press.

Avengelyne returned to comics in the Arcana Studio one-shot Avengelyne vs. Koni Waves in February 2010. In July 2011, a new ongoing Avengelyne series debuted at Image Comics under the creative team of Mark Poulton and Owen Gieni.

== Character biography ==
As described in an article in Deadline Hollywood:

Avengelyne ... was the most feared warrior in Heaven's Warhost, having single-handedly broken into Pandemonium, the outer fortress of Hell, to confront the Devil himself. She is a fallen angel, banished from Heaven by God after being tricked into questioning His love for humans. Avengelyne was stripped of all her angelic abilities, other than her great strength and her blood, which, once extracted from her body, could be used as a weapon or a miracle once empowered by quoting verses from the Bible. Avengelyne uses her powers to fight demons on earth and is being groomed to be humankind's last hope in a coming Armageddon.

== In other media ==
By July 2013, co-creator Rob Liefeld and Gina Carano were working on a big-screen adaptation of the series in which Carano was to star as Avengelyne. In November 2016, Paramount Pictures purchased the film rights for Avengelyne with Akiva Goldsman as the intended producer. In April 2024, it was announced Margot Robbie's LuckyChap Entertainment and Simon Kinberg's Genre Films were producing a feature film adaptation of the character set to be directed by Olivia Wilde. Deadline then reported Warner Bros. Pictures was pre-emptively nearing a seven figure deal to acquire the project, with Robbie set to play the titular character, despite initial reports denying this, and Tony McNamara set to write the screenplay.

== Bibliography ==
- Avengelyne #1–3 (mini-series, Maximum Press)
- Avengelyne vol. 2, #1–14 (Maximum Press)
- Avengelyne vol. 3, #1 (unfinished series, Awesome Entertainment)
- Avengelyne: Armageddon #1–3 (mini-series, Maximum Press)
- Avengelyne: Bible (one-shot special, Maximum Press)
- Avengelyne: Deadly Sins #1–2 (mini-series, Maximum Press)
- Avengelyne: Power #1–3 (mini-series, Maximum Press)

Avengelyne also appears through various issues of Asylum.

Avatar Press put out a version of Avengelyne commonly considered in different continuity:

- Avengelyne: Bad Blood #1–2
- Avengelyne: Dark Depths #1–2
- Avengelyne: Dragon Realm #1–2
- Avengelyne: Revelation
- Avengelyne: Seraphicide #½, 1

Image Comics began releasing an Avengelyne series in 2011 that followed the Maximum Press continuity:

- Avengelyne vol. 4 #1–8 (July 2011 – May 2012) (unfinished series)

Crossovers

- Avengelyne/Demonslayer
- Avengelyne/Glory
- Avengelyne/Glory II: The Godyssey
- Avengelyne/Warrior Nun Areala
- Avengelyne/Pandora
- Avengelyne/Prophet #1–2
- Avengelyne/Shi
- Avengelyne vs. Koni Waves
- Glory/Avengelyne
- Warrior Nun Areala and Avengelyne 1996
