= A Impostora =

Portuguese telenovela

- "Quem vê caras, não vê intenções" (Portuguese) "Who sees faces, sees no intentions" (English)
- Genre: Romance, Melodrama
- Created by: António Barreira
- Developed by: Plural Entertainment
- Directed by: Jorge Queiroga
- Starring: Dalila Carmo; Diogo Infante; Fernanda Serrano (see more)
- Opening theme: "Impostora" by Aurea
- Ending theme: "Impostora" by Aurea
- Country of origin: Portugal
- Original language: Portuguese
- No. of seasons: 2
- No. of episodes: 341

Production
- Running time: 55min

Original release
- Network: TVI
- Release: September 4, 2016 – November 30, 2017

Related
- La Impostora

A Impostora (English: The Pretender) is a Portuguese telenovela that was broadcast and produced by TVI. It is directed by Jorge Queiroga and written by António Barreira. The telenovela premiered on September 4, 2016 and ended on November 30, 2017. It was filmed in Portugal and Africa.

== Plot ==
=== Season 1 ===
An airplane disappears mysteriously; on board was Verónica, the twin sister of Vitória, the victim of a fraud by a millionaire. Presumed dead, Verónica assumes the identity of her sister and plans to avenge herself on the entrepreneur's family, finding a strong opponent in his wife Diana.

Season	Episodes	Originally released		Rating	Share
Season	Episodes	First released	Last released	Rating	Share
1	111	September 4, 2016	January 26, 2017	TBA	TBA
2	230	January 30, 2017	November 30, 2017	TBA	TBA

== Cast ==
Actor	Character	Season	
Actor	Character	1	2
Dalila Carmo	Vitória Mendes	Guest	
Dalila Carmo	Verónica Mendes	Regular	Regular
Diogo Infante	Rodrigo Varela	Regular	Regular
Fernanda Serrano	Diana Martins Varela	Regular	Regular
Rita Cruz	Yara Manhiça	Regular	Regular
Ery Costa	Samuel Matshine	Regular	
Alba Baptista	Beatriz Martins Varela	Regular	Regular
Ana Catarina Afonso	Vanessa Soares	Regular	Regular
Ana Cristina de Oliveira	Rita Nogueira	Recurring	Regular
António Pedro Cerdeira	Paulo de Jesus Pires (Paulinho)	Regular	Regular
Bárbara Branco	Maria Augusta Lancastre Varela (Guta)	Regular	Regular
Carlos Vieira	Rafael Vale	Recurring	Regular
Carloto Cotta	Matias Novaes		Regular
Celso Roberto	Raúl Bandiza		Regular
Diogo Amaral	Gustavo Martins	Regular	Regular
Diogo Costa Reis	Gabriel Lopes		Regular
Elisa Lisboa	Maria Amélia Martins	Recurring	Regular
Elmano Sancho	Celso Chaves	Regular	
Evandro Gomes	Lázaro Alves (La Zer)	Regular	Regular
Eunice Munõz	Pureza Ferreira da Costa	Regular	Regular
Fernando Luís	Ricardo Varela	Regular	Regular
Fernando Pires	Valentim Costa	Regular	Regular
Graciano Dias	Daniel Figueiredo	Regular	Regular
Gonçalo Cabral	Carlos Matshine	Regular	Regular
Helena Isabel	Assunção Ferreira da Costa Lancastre	Regular	Regular
Isaac Alfaiate	Miguel Fonseca	Regular	
João Pedro Dantas	Martim Pinto Guedes		Regular
Joana Seixas	Íris Machado	Regular	Regular
Luís Lucas	Renato Bettencourt Rodrigues		Regular
Madalena Brandão	Marta Manhiça Varela	Regular	Regular
Manuel Wiborg	Inspetor Alberto Camacho	Guest	Regular
Marcantónio Del Carlo	Bernardo Vieira		Regular
Maria José Paschoal	Juliana Morgado		Regular
Maya Booth	Patrícia Carolino	Regular	Regular
Melânia Gomes	Vânia Tavares	Regular	Regular
Mikaela Lupu	Sofia Fontes	Regular	Regular
Nuno Nunes	Inspetor Mota	Recurring	Regular
Núria Madruga	Felipa Ferreira da Costa Lancastre	Regular	Regular
Patrícia Tavares	Lígia Neto	Regular	Regular
Pedro Granger	Afonso Varela	Regular	Regular
Pedro Lamares	Frederico Varela	Guest	
Pedro Teixeira	Gonçalo Pereira	Regular	Regular
Rita Salema	Guilhermina Fontes «Guigui»	Regular	Regular
Rodrigo Paganelli	Dinis Martins Varela	Regular	
Sabri Lucas	Padre Francisco	Regular	Regular
Sandra Faleiro	Carolina Ferreira da Costa Lancastre	Regular	Regular
Simone Santos	Nicole	Regular	Regular
Sofia Aparício	Adelaide Carla Pires	Regular	Regular
Vítor Silva Costa	Joaquim António Pires «Quitó»	Regular	
João Perry	Jacinto Mendes	Regular	Regular
Maria de Lourdes Norberto	Ann Blumm	Regular	Regular
Fernanda Lapa	Amália	Recurring	
Maria do Céu Guerra	Lucrécia Alves	Regular	
Nicolau Breyner (†)	Edmundo Gaspar	Guest	

(†) Deceased actor

=== Children ===
Actor	Character	Season	
Actor	Character	1	2
André Carvalho	Jaime Mendes (Jaiminho)	Regular	Regular
Isabel Sousa	Muzima Xavier	Regular	Regular
?	Clara Mendes Varela (Clarinha)		Regular
