= Panos Cosmatos =

Greek Canadian film director

- Born: February 1, 1974 (age 52); Rome, Italy
- Occupations: Film director; screenwriter; film producer
- Years active: 1993–present
- Father: George P. Cosmatos

Panos Cosmatos (born February 1, 1974) is an Italian-Canadian film director and screenwriter. He is known for Beyond the Black Rainbow and Mandy.

== Life and career ==
Cosmatos was born in Italy to Greek-Italian film-maker George P. Cosmatos (whose credits include Rambo: First Blood Part II and Cobra) and Swedish sculptor Birgitta Ljungberg-Cosmatos. The family moved to Victoria, British Columbia, in the early 1980s.

As a child, Cosmatos frequented a video store named Video Attic. During these trips, he would browse the horror and sci-fi sections looking at the covers of films he was not allowed to watch, instead imagining what these films were like based on the images.

His first break in the film industry was being a second-unit video assist operator for his father's film Tombstone.

He made his first feature film, Beyond the Black Rainbow (2010), by financing it through D.V.D. residuals from Tombstone.

In 2017, Cosmatos directed the action horror film Mandy, which was produced by Legion M. The film starred Nicolas Cage, Andrea Riseborough and Linus Roache. It premiered at the 2018 Sundance Film Festival on January 19, and began a limited cinematic release and VOD play on September 14, 2018.

He is married to Andrea Cosmatos.

== Themes ==
The director admits a dislike for baby boomers' new age spiritual ideals, an issue he addresses in Beyond the Black Rainbow. The use of psychedelic drugs for mind-expansion purposes is also explored, although Cosmatos' take on it is "dark and disturbing", a "brand of psychedelia that stands in direct opposition to the flower child, magic mushroom peace trip" wrote a reviewer describing one of the characters who happened to be a boomer:

I look at Arboria as kind of naïve. He had the best of intentions of wanting to expand human consciousness, but I think his ego got in the way of that and ultimately it turned into a poisonous, destructive thing. Because Arboria is trying to control consciousness and control the mind. There is a moment of truth in the film where the whole thing starts to disintegrate because it stops being about their humanity and becomes about an unattainable goal. That is the "Black Rainbow": trying to achieve some kind of unattainable state that is ultimately, probably destructive.

== Academic reception ==
Panos Cosmatos' films, particularly Beyond the Black Rainbow (2010) and Mandy (2018), have been the subject of scholarly analysis in film studies, focusing on themes of monstrosity, psychoanalytic critique, aesthetic degradation, and influences from genres like giallo and horror. Michael Eden's philosophical examination interprets Cosmatos' antagonists as embodiments of the "abortive superman," a failed Nietzschean Übermensch characterized by ego dissolution, megalomania, and grotesque transformation, drawing on Freudian concepts of the psyche and critiquing societal forces such as conservatism, celebrity culture, and capitalism. In Beyond the Black Rainbow, Eden analyzes Dr. Barry Nyle's psychedelic-induced monstrosity as a symbol of 1980s cultural repression and the collapse of countercultural ideals, while in Mandy, Jeremiah Sand's breakdown reflects narcissistic delusion and cult dynamics.

Scholars have also explored Cosmatos' distinctive visual style, emphasizing intentional degradation to evoke the uncanny and surrealism. In a comparative study of aesthetics, Daniel Sandberg and Kim Jakobsson highlight how Beyond the Black Rainbow uses grain, noise filters, overexposure, and unconventional lighting to create defamiliarization, blurring the lines between dream and reality, and producing uncanny valley effects through distorted human forms. This degradation serves a narrative purpose, deviating from high-resolution norms to heighten psychological unease and challenge viewer expectations.

Further analysis situates Cosmatos within the evolution of giallo aesthetics in contemporary horror and sci-fi. Vicente Javier Pérez Valero discusses how Cosmatos draws from directors like Mario Bava and Dario Argento, employing saturated colors (e.g., purple for the supernatural, red for danger) and low-key lighting to create unreal environments in Beyond the Black Rainbow and Mandy. In Mandy, color transitions and retro effects homage 1980s horror while blending supernatural and revenge motifs, prioritizing aesthetic innovation over traditional narrative.

== Filmography ==
Film

| Year | Title | Director | Writer |
|---|---|---|---|
| 2010 | Beyond the Black Rainbow | Yes | Yes |
| 2018 | Mandy | Yes | Yes |
| TBA | Flesh of the Gods | Yes | Story |
| TBA | Nekrokosm | Yes | Story |

Executive producer

- Rewind This! (2013)

Producer

- Something Beautiful (2025)

Television

| Year | Title | Director | Writer | Notes |
|---|---|---|---|---|
| 2022 | Guillermo del Toro's Cabinet of Curiosities | Yes | Yes | Episode "The Viewing" |
