= Warrior Nun (TV series) =

American fantasy drama television series

- Genre: Fantasy drama; Supernatural; Occult detective; Superhero
- Created by: Simon Barry
- Based on: Warrior Nun Areala by Ben Dunn
- Starring: Alba Baptista; Toya Turner; Lorena Andrea; Kristina Tonteri-Young; Tristán Ulloa; Thekla Reuten; Sylvia De Fanti; William Miller
- Narrated by: Alba Baptista
- Composers: Jeff Russo; Tangelene Bolton
- Country of origin: United States
- Original language: English
- No. of seasons: 2
- No. of episodes: 18

Production
- Executive producers: Simon Barry; Stephen Hegyes; Jet Wilkinson; Dean English; Robert Burke
- Producers: Zack Tucker Gangnes; Peter Welter Soler; Matt Bosack; Todd Giroux
- Production location: Spain
- Camera setup: Single-camera
- Running time: 37–52 minutes
- Production company: Reality Distortion Field

Original release
- Network: Netflix
- Release: July 2, 2020 – November 10, 2022

Warrior Nun is an American fantasy drama television series created by Simon Barry based on the comic book character Warrior Nun Areala by Ben Dunn. Developed as a feature film adaptation, the idea was re-imagined as a television series for Netflix when the service had given the production a series order for a first season. Filming takes place in locations in Andalusia, Spain, such as Antequera, where the headquarters of the fictional Order of the Cruciform Sword was filmed.

The series is narrated and led by Portuguese actress Alba Baptista in the role of Ava Silva, a quadriplegic orphan who discovers she now has supernatural powers which force her to join an ancient order of warrior nuns. The series marks Baptista's English-language debut. The cast also features Toya Turner, Thekla Reuten, Lorena Andrea, Kristina Tonteri-Young, Sylvia De Fanti and Tristán Ulloa.

The series premiered on July 2, 2020, to generally positive reviews, while the second season premiered on November 11, 2022. In December 2022, the series was canceled after two seasons. On August 15, 2023, a revival trilogy of feature films was announced to be in development. However, in April 2025, creator Simon Barry shared an update in which he stated that he does not know the current status of the movie trilogy.

== Premise ==
Warrior Nun revolves around the story of a 19-year-old who wakes up in a morgue with a new lease on life and a divine artifact embedded in her back. She discovers she is now part of the ancient Order of the Cruciform Sword that has been tasked with fighting demons on Earth, and powerful forces representing both heaven and hell want to find and control her.

== Cast and characters ==
=== Main ===
- Alba Baptista as Ava Silva
  - Isabella Tabares portrays a young Ava (guest season 1)
- Toya Turner as Sister Mary / Shotgun Mary (season 1)
- Lorena Andrea as Sister Lilith
- Kristina Tonteri-Young as Sister Beatrice
- Tristán Ulloa as Father Vincent
- Thekla Reuten as Jillian Salvius
- Sylvia De Fanti as Mother Superion (season 2; recurring season 1)
  - Isabel M. Hernanz portrays a young Mother Superion (guest season 2)
- William Miller as Adriel (season 2; recurring season 1)

=== Recurring ===
- Olivia Delcán as Sister Camila
- Emilio Sakraya as JC (season 1)
- May Simón Lifschitz as Chanel (season 1)
- Charlotte Vega as Zori (season 1)
- Dimitri Abold as Randall (season 1)
- Peter de Jersey as Kristian Schaefer
- Joaquim de Almeida as Cardinal / Pope Francisco Duretti
- Lope Haydn Evans as young Michael Salvius (season 1)
  - Jack Mullarkey as adult Michael Salvius / Miguel (season 2)
- Meena Rayann as Yasmine Amunet (season 2)
- Richard Clothier as Cardinal William Foster (season 2)
- Sadiqua Binum as Sister Dora (season 2)

=== Guest ===
- Melina Matthews as Sister Shannon Masters
- Fred Pritchard as Diego (season 1)
- Frances Tomelty as Sister Frances (season 1)
- Kay Headley as Villa Owner (season 1)
- Guiomar Alonso as Areala de Cordoue
- Alberto Ruano as Mateo (season 1)
- Sinead MacInnes as Sister Crimson (season 1)
- Oscar Foronda as the Crusader Knight (season 1)
- Julius Cotter as the Archbishop of Canterbury (season 2)
- Miquel Ripeu as Cardinal Rossi (season 2)
- Christian Stamm as Cardinal Gunter (season 2)
- Andrea Tivadar as Reya (season 2)

== Episodes ==
=== Series overview ===
Season	Episodes	Originally released
1	10	July 2, 2020
2	8	November 10, 2022

=== Season 1 (2020) ===
No. overall	No. in season	Title	Directed by	Written by	Original release date
1	1	"Psalms 46:5"	Jet Wilkinson	Teleplay by : Simon Barry	July 2, 2020
A team of nuns including the last Warrior Nun – Sister Shannon – gather in a church. Sister Shannon soon dies from wounds she received in a recent battle against armed mercenaries. When the mercenaries find them at the church, the nuns race to extract the holy object from Sister Shannon and hide it in the corpse of Ava Silva. Ava is soon resurrected and finds she is able to walk and is not quadriplegic anymore. With her newfound mobility, she explores the city. She jumps into a pool and is saved by JC from drowning. JC introduces Ava to his friends who are squatting at a mansion. When she goes to a party with the group, she sees a red, cloudy mist that no one else can see. Meanwhile, at the Church, Father Vincent and the nuns discover that Ava's body and the holy object are missing. Father Vincent searches for her at her orphanage and tries to track her down. Later, a Tarask from hell enters the church to discover the holy object has been extracted from the body of Sister Shannon.
2	2	"Proverbs 31:25"	Jet Wilkinson	Terri Hughes Burton	July 2, 2020
Cardinal Duretti gives Father Vincent a day to find the halo, but Father Vincent wonders if the halo is meant to be with Ava. Mary tracks the mercenaries' bullets to their creator and then to their supplier, and it later becomes clear that the mercenaries are contracted to work for ArqTech. Ava worries that she doesn't fit in with JC and his friends, and they take her to sneak into a party at ArqTech. At the party, ArqTech's Dr. Salvius demonstrates that she can stabilize the Higgs field to create a quantum portal, but Cardinal Duretti recognizes that she has used divinium to do so and demands that the holy relic be returned to the church. Ava is attacked by the tarask, but Father Vincent and the nuns save and capture her.
3	3	"Ephesians 6:11"	Agnieszka Smoczyńska	Amy Berg	July 2, 2020
Father Vincent introduces Ava to the history of the Order of the Cruciform Sword, which was founded by Areala of Cordoba. Mother Superion cruelly trains Ava to draw out her cowardice and confronts her with the orphanage file's contention that she committed suicide, which Ava denies, but Father Vincent instructs Superion to give Ava a chance. Later on, Ava flees, leaving a note for Father Vincent: "I want to live." Mary interrogates Macready, leader of the mercenary group, who says that he didn't know what was in the crates the group was transporting for ArqTech and concludes that the rigged crate may have been meant to kill only Shannon. JC and his friends enter a new mansion to be confronted by Dr. Salvius, who's seeking Ava.
4	4	"Ecclesiasticus 26:9-10"	Agnieszka Smoczyńska	David Hayter	July 2, 2020
The nuns break into ArqTech and recover the shield, with Beatrice especially demonstrating her fighting skills. The Salviuses plan to hire the rest of Macready's outfit to deal with them, as they're now at war with the church. JC leaves behind his friends to join Ava in running away, but she leaves him at the airport, promising to return, to save Diego, whom she realizes Sister Frances is likely to kill, as Ava now realizes she was killed. Ava kills Frances when Frances tries to poison her, and then encounters Lilith upon leaving the orphanage. Lilith draws her sword, saying that she only needs a part of Ava, as Duretti had earlier told her that even a dire sin might be forgiven if the halo were recovered. Mary finds a bit of Shannon's habit in a crack in the wall, suggesting that she had a secret space only she could phase into.
5	5	"Matthew 7:13"	Sarah Walker	Matt Bosack	July 2, 2020
Lilith proves to Ava that she can hurt her with her divinium sword, but Mary saves Ava from Lilith's attack and continues to hinder Lilith throughout the episode to try to persuade her to give Ava a chance. Ava and JC take a ferry to Morocco but hide to double back on board to a different port, but fail to shake Lilith and Mary. At the end of the chase JC's about to leave Ava for not telling him the truth when a tarask appears to attack. Lilith is impaled by the tarask and vanishes with it when Ava strikes it with Lilith's sword. Ava flees from all of them afterward. Dr. Salvius presents the unfinished larger version of the portal to the press and accuses Duretti and the Vatican of heresy in refusing to share Heaven with the public. Duretti sends the shield to the Vatican but it's intercepted by ArqTech goons after Vincent shares the transport plan with Dr. Salvius in the hope that she will understand that they are at war with Hell.
6	6	"Isaiah 30:20-21"	Sarah Walker	Amy Berg	July 2, 2020
Mary catches up with Ava and they make their way to a village (unnamed in the show but filmed in Ronda) that was formerly the site of widespread demonic possessions, including the local priest Father Orozco, that Mary and the OCS addressed. Ava asks God to tell her what to do and a statue of a nun seems to cry, but it's just water dripping from the ceiling. Mary tells Ava that she suspects Durreti had something to do with Shannon's death. Ava sees signs of possession around a man and she and Mary exorcize the demon from him. Mary calls for a ride from the OCS and Beatrice picks her up. Ava stays behind, but Mary's convinced she'll rejoin them and gave Ava a divinium dagger before leaving.
7	7	"Ephesians 4:22-24"	Mathias Herndl	Sheila Wilson & Suzanne Keilly	July 2, 2020
The sisters hold a memorial for Lilith, which is interrupted by the arrival of Sister Crimson and other rejected applicants to the Order, now readmitted by Duretti despite Mother Superion's protests. Duretti also reassigns Beatrice and Vincent outside of the Order. Vincent tells Mary that Shannon came to him weeks before her death to say the Vatican was hiding something and that he urged her to speak with Duretti, so Vincent may be responsible for Shannon's death. Ava submits herself to testing by Dr. Salvius, who covertly tries to use her to power the portal, but the effort fails. Salvius then introduces Ava to her son Michael who is alive only because of divinium in his system and whom the "Ark" (portal) could send to a parallel dimension beyond pain. Ava decides to return to the Order and Mary persuades her to phase into Shannon's hidden room, where she finds a hoard of divinium and an ancient book that says that there is a secret buried under the Vatican that anchors demons to our world. In the end, Lilith appears from an evil-looking portal outside the church.
8	8	"Proverbs 14:1"	Mathias Herndl	David Hayter & Matt Bosack	July 2, 2020
Shannon's book is a diary of past Warrior Nuns that mentions a secret beneath the Vatican: the angel Adriel's bones, buried there after he gave up his halo and became mortal as a result. Shannon learned that the church deliberately keeps the bones there to maintain the people's need for the church. They fear that Duretti wants to claim the bones' power. Ava trains to phase through a 20-foot wall with Beatrice's help, Vincent uses his past enforcer skills to acquire a map of the Vatican catacombs, and Kristian helps them with Vatican security procedures. Lilith returns and claims not to remember anything and is cared for by Salvius. Ava promises that she will destroy the bones and be the last Warrior Nun.
9	9	"2 Corinthians 10:4"	Simon Barry	Terri Hughes Burton	July 2, 2020
Ava, Vincent, and the sisters enter the Vatican to find Adriel's bones, with Mother Superion shadowing them. Meanwhile, the Papal Conclave meets to choose the new Pope, during which Duretti notices his divinium ring glowing and realizes that Ava must be in the catacombs beneath. Duretti sends Sister Crimson and the rejects to waylay her, but Vincent and Mary, with unexpected help from Mother Superion, hold them off. At ArqTech, Lilith visits Michael, who says that Ava is "almost to the door." Lilith says that that can't happen and teleports to the catacombs in time to kill Sister Crimson, but then is calmed down by Mary before she can pursue Ava. Ava and Beatrice find the vault and Ava phases into it, encountering the divinium skeleton of a tarask en route, only to find not Adriel's bones but Adriel himself.
10	10	"Revelation 2:10"	Simon Barry	Simon Barry	July 2, 2020
Adriel's touch reveals to Ava, who sees herself in Areala's place, that Adriel was not an angel but a demon who stole the halo and then placed it in Areala to befuddle pursuit by the tarasks. Ava draws on the power of the halo to knock Adriel back and then Beatrice's explosives blow open the vault. Duretti, after being elected Pope, is confronted by Mother Superion, and turns out to have been worried only about the Order affecting his own reputation. Michael enters the portal, which is briefly powered by Adriel and Ava's conflict, but Dr. Salvius is unable to follow him. When Adriel pursues the sisters as they flee, Vincent confronts him and reveals himself to be a servant of Adriel who killed Shannon and arranged all these events to free Adriel. The episode ends with Mary being swarmed by civilians possessed by wraith demons summoned by Adriel.

=== Season 2 (2022) ===
No. overall	No. in season	Title	Directed by	Written by	Original release date
11	1	"Galatians 6:4-5"	Sarah Walker	Simon Barry	November 10, 2022
Two months have passed since the events at the Vatican where Adriel was released from his tomb and Mary disappeared. The sisters of the Order of the Cruciform Sword (OCS) have scattered across Europe, hiding from Adriel's growing followers. Ava and Beatrice live and train in Switzerland, working at a bar where they meet Miguel, a mysterious young man working towards stopping Adriel's rise. Mother Superion and Camilla are in Spain, also looking for ways to curtail Adriel, while Lilith hunts for Father Vincent in Portugal after his betrayal. In the course of Duretti's new duties as Pope he meets Sister Yasmine, who is doing research in the guise of a news article. Dr. Salvius continues to try to understand the "Ark" (portal) in hopes of bringing her son Michael home. Schaefer uses her distraction to steer ArqTech towards aiding Adriel, with Pope Duretti dissuading his efforts. Duretti continues to communicate with Mother Superion, who urges him and the Vatican to take a public stand against Adriel. Camilla discovers an attack on the sisters' headquarters in Madrid with many of her fellow sisters being killed. Ava and Beatrice discuss their best course of action against Adriel, while attempting to cut loose, before meeting with Miguel in the hopes of gaining valuable intel in his efforts to expose Adriel's Firstborn Children. Lilith continues to look into answers for what she is becoming.
12	2	"Colossians 3:9-10"	Sarah Walker	Amy Berg & Andréa Vasilo	November 10, 2022
Ava, Beatrice and Miguel follow members of the Firstborn Children (FBC) and observe them performing a ritual that invokes a swarm of locusts. While returning home Miguel questions Ava and Beatrice on their true identities, but is unconvinced by their answers. Mother Superion and Camila look into the widespread massacres of many of the sisters of the OCS, meeting Yasmine during their search and questioning her agenda, while looking for answers about Adriel and the worldwide attack on the OCS. Adriel performs what many witnesses claim to be a miracle on live TV. Lilith goes to visit her mother in the hopes of finding a friendly face, but is met only with disdain. Ava and Beatrice again work with Miguel after the Samaritans capture a member of the Firstborn Children. Adriel meets with Pope Duretti looking to be legitimized. Lilith returns to Dr. Salvius, hoping that she can shed light on her new found abilities. Ava and Beatrice argue about their exposure after Ava uses the halo to save Beatrice from the demon, before reconciling and receiving a calling from the OCS to come together. They also gain new knowledge about Mary and discover that she has been lost to them, sharing a tearful embrace for their fallen friend. Father Vincent meets with Adriel, to inform him about the OCS, who continues to use him to work against them.
13	3	"Luke 8:17"	Kasia Adamik	Brenden Gallagher	November 10, 2022
Ava and Beatrice travel to Madrid to reconvene with the remaining members of the OCS. Father Vincent manages to track them down and tranquilize Beatrice, before Ava phases to return the favor to him, knocking him out so they can escape. She takes a still groggy Beatrice to reunite with Camila and Mother Superion, who inform them about how the OCS will proceed following the attacks. Yasmine tells Ava and the nuns that she knows how to defeat Adriel, which involves acquiring Christ's Crown of Thorns from a museum in Madrid. They run into trouble when the crown they take from the museum turns out to be a copy, before they realize where the real crown is hidden and it activates upon Ava’s touch. Camila discovers that she can communicate telepathically with Adriel. Pope Duretti uses any means necessary to gain information on Adriel's plans and what ArqTech, under Schaefer, are doing to help him. Lilith continues to work with Dr. Salvius to uncover answers, before growing tired of the lack of results and resigning to seek understanding from Adriel himself.
14	4	"1 Corinthians 10:20-21"	Kasia Adamik	Suzanne Keilly	November 10, 2022
The nuns trigger the alarm at the museum, as Ava visits Adriel's realm after being knocked out by Father Vincent, while Camila was distracted by visions of Adriel. Ava awakens in a weakened state to see that Vincent has taken the crown, before he is attacked by Miguel, who shows up to help her overpower him. Lilith speaks to a wary Adriel looking for answers about what she is turning into. He tells her about Reya's role in gaining her powers. Dr. Salvius furthers her research into the "Ark" (portal) to understand where it draws its power from. The nuns evade the police and capture Vincent. Dr. Salvius comes to realize what Shaefer has been doing with ArqTech, demanding answers into why he is helping Adriel. Mother Superion attempts to dispose of Vincent, but can't bring herself to follow through with it. Beatrice goes in search of Ava and finds her with Miguel being attacked by demon controlled followers of Adriel (FBC). They evade the zealots after Beatrice encourages her to "let go" in using the halo's energy. Miguel tells them that they will be safe if he takes them to his home.
15	5	"Mark 10:45"	Denis Rovira	Sheila Wilson	November 10, 2022
Miguel's home turns out to be Dr. Salvius's estate and it is revealed that he is actually Michael her long lost son, aged forward during his time in Adriel's realm. The nuns learn more about the history between Reya, Adriel, and Areala, which led to Adriel's imprisonment under the Vatican. Dr. Salvius is overjoyed at her son's return and tells the nuns about her findings while working with Lilith. Michael informs his mother about the time he spent in Adriel's realm; how it changed him and why he has returned to try to stop Adriel. Camila confesses to Beatrice about her growing ability to communicate with Adriel, who runs tests on her to try to understand what is happening. Mother Superion and Yasmine meet with Pope Duretti and a contingent of priests. During the meeting followers of Adriel (FBC) attack the contingent, killing most of them. Ava, Beatrice, and Michael arrive to help Mother Superion, Yasmine, and Pope Duretti escape. During the escape the halo, which has been losing power of late malfunctions while Ava is in midair. She falls many stories and appears to die, with a tearful Beatrice crying over her. The halo then restarts and Ava resurrects, telling Beatrice that they can't be stopped together. Adriel tries to show Lilith her true powers and the potential they hold, which allows her to see demons and gain wings. Beatrice discovers that a divinium cross has been embedded into Camila's spine, allowing her communication with Adriel, and wonders if Dr. Salvius can help. She apologizes for being hard on Camila after the museum and Camila comments on the clear attraction between Ava and Beatrice. Schaefer and Vincent meet to consolidate their allegiance with Adriel. Dr. Salvius discovers that Adriel is gaining energy from people's prayers.
16	6	"Isaiah 40:31"	Denis Rovira	David Hayter	November 10, 2022
In a flashback to Mother Superion's time as the warrior nun, her recklessness is put on display, leading to the halo rejecting her. She explains to Ava her arrogance as a warning in the hopes she will put her trust in her sisters, as she had failed to do. The nuns discuss the best course of action to stop Adriel. Camila communicates directly to Adriel, who tries to entice her over to his side, but Camila rebuffs him. Michael tells Ava that he harbors a divinium bomb that he needs her to ignite in order to kill Adriel. Pope Duretti is now a prisoner of his second-in-command William, who has been brainwashed by Adriel into fealty. Adriel meets with Vincent and extrapolates on his plan to usher in a new world to save humanity from themselves, who voices his growing disagreement with the methods being used to procure it. The nuns plan their assault on Adriel's followers and how they will infiltrate his cathedral. As the halo loses power again, stopping and restarting, Ava encounters Lilith, who provides opposition in her attempt to interrupt the energy flow Adriel is gathering from people's prayers. Adriel uses Pope Duretti to try to legitimize himself, who is then burned to death by the energy emanating from Adriel's cathedral. Beatrice stops Ava from detonating the bomb and saving her life, but cannot retrieve the crown, as an all out battle between the OCS and FBC commences.
17	7	"Psalms 116:15"	Simon Barry	David Hayter & Sheila Wilson	November 10, 2022
Ava and Lilith continue their fight and both come away with scars. Mother Superion, critically wounded by attacking FBC members dies, and is brought back to life by Ava through the halo's power. Beatrice has a crisis of faith, believing that Camila and Yasmine were lost in the fight and that the death of Pope Duretti is for nothing, as Adriel continues to gain energy from people's prayers. Ava reminds Beatrice of who she is and that they can stop Adriel together, while they collectively wish things were different. Camila, Yasmine, and others are held captive in Adriel's cathedral. Michael tells his mother that Reya has told him that he alone can stop Adriel, and they lament the lost time between them. Ava and Michael continue to plan for a way to stop Adriel with differing opinions about how it can be achieved. Ava remembers that Vincent took the crown and goes to retrieve it from him. Camila and Yasmine look for ways to escape the cathedral, as more people are being brainwashed and drained of their energy through prayer. Ava brings Vincent back to Dr. Salvius's estate where she tries to learn about Adriel's plans through his divinium tattoos, before finally understanding what she must do.
18	8	"Jeremiah 29:13"	Simon Barry	Simon Barry	November 10, 2022
Ava finally realizes that Michael is right about using the divinium bomb to stop Adriel and they vow to keep it between themselves. The nuns gather to form a new plan to assault Adriel's cathedral. Michael attempts to say goodbye to his mother, knowing what lies ahead, while Ava does the same with Beatrice, by starting a letter to her. Ava tells Mother Superion that she does not want the sisters to follow her for fear of their demise. Camila and Yasmine are reunited with the sisters as they converge on Adriel's cathedral. A fight ensues between the OCS and FBC as Ava seeks to forge ahead alone with Michael to confront Adriel. She tells Beatrice that she must sacrifice herself, so that she and the others can live and they share a kiss. Vincent continues to try to make members of the FBC see the error of their ways. As Ava and Michael converge on Adriel, Lilith appears to cut them down. Members of the OCS are over powered by the FBC as Adriel grandstands, drinking in his impending victory. He attempts to pull Reya through the "Ark" (portal) to cement his power as a god. Ava detonates the bomb in Michael’s corpse and believes it has destroyed Adriel for good, but he is only wounded. Camila uses her connection to Adriel to distract him, so she can destroy the cross which boosts his power. Beatrice, having fought her way to Ava's side, helps as Ava summons demons from Adriel's realm to finally kill him, freeing all those enslaved to him. After Reya eliminates all of the demons and returns to her realm, Ava lays dying in Beatrice's arms from the bomb's divinium shards. Ava tells Beatrice to take the halo, which she refuses, before Lilith suggests that the only way to heal Ava is for her to pass through the "Ark" (portal). Ava and Beatrice exchange "I love yous" as Ava departs, before Lilith tells Beatrice to get ready for a holy war that is coming. In a post credits scene Beatrice departs the OCS, as the warrior nun's divinium sword lights up.

== Production ==
=== Development ===
On September 28, 2018, it was announced that Netflix had given the production a series order for a first season consisting of ten episodes. Simon Barry was set to serve as showrunner for the series. Barry is also credited as an executive producer alongside Stephen Hegyes with Terri Hughes Burton serving as a co-executive producer for the series. Production companies involved with the series are Barry's Reality Distortion Field and Fresco Film Services. The series premiered on July 2, 2020. On August 19, 2020, Netflix renewed the series for a second season. On December 13, 2022, it has been announced that the series has been canceled after two seasons.

=== Casting ===
Sometime after the series order announcement, it was confirmed that Alba Baptista, Toya Turner, Tristan Ulloa, Thekla Reuten, Kristina Tonteri-Young, Lorena Andrea, and Emilio Sakraya would star in the series. On April 1, 2019, it was announced that Sylvia De Fanti had joined the cast as a series regular. On October 18, 2021, Meena Rayann, Jack Mullarkey and Richard Clothier joined the cast as recurring roles for the second season.

=== Filming ===
Filming for the first season took place on location of Andalusia (Spain), in the town of Antequera (where the headquarters of the Order of the Cruciform Sword is located) Marbella, Ronda, Málaga, and Sevilla, from March 11, 2019 to July 5, 2019. The El Tajo Gorge was featured in one of the scenes. Pre-production for the second season began in late May 2021 and filming began in late July 2021 in Madrid, Spain. Production for the second season wrapped up on November 4 in Spain.

== Release ==
On June 17, 2020, Netflix released the official trailer for the series, and the first season was released on July 2, 2020. The second season was released on November 10, 2022.

== Reception ==
On Rotten Tomatoes, season 1 has an approval rating of 68% based on 34 critic reviews, with an average rating of 6.5/10. The website's critics consensus reads, "Though Warrior Nun's heavy handed set-up weighs it down, committed performances and excellent fight choreography may be enough for those looking for more pulp with their pulpit." On Rotten Tomatoes, season 2 has an approval rating of 100% based on reviews from 11 critics. On Metacritic, the show has a weighted average score of 62 out of 100, based on reviews from 7 critics, indicating "generally favorable reviews".

Roxana Hadadi of The A.V. Club wrote: "The script can sometimes lean too much on mythological and religious exposition... but the actors have such good chemistry that their various pairings work, and the smartly choreographed fight scenes are well-placed." Hadadi said that "Warrior Nun is undoubtedly familiar" influenced by the likes of Veronica Mars, Buffy the Vampire Slayer, and Alex Garland's Devs, but that when the show really clicks it becomes "its own distinct experience rather than simply a derivative facsimile of those inspirations." She praised the performances, particularly Toya Turner as Shotgun Mary, and gives the show a grade B−. Nicole Drum of ComicBook.com gave the review 3 out of 5, and wrote: "Warrior Nun is a truly wild journey that manages to ask some tough questions while equally embracing its silliness, its action, and the absolute absurdity of it all. The show may not be everyone's cup of tea, but it is one hell of a fun ride."

While the majority of critics praised the choreography of the series, some took issue with the pacing of the plot and the extensive exposition of the plot. Robyn Bahr, of The Hollywood Reporter notes, "Thematically, Warrior Nun is nothing you haven't seen before, and aesthetically, nothing you ever want to see again... Bleak, dour and trudging, the series contains none of the kitschy, blasphemous fun of its title." Critic Steve Murray notes that Warrior Nun has "both potential and problems in equal measure"; supposing that the series is trying to recreate the feel of Buffy the Vampire Slayer but with less witty dialogue and creativity.

Reviewing season 2, Paul Tassi of Forbes wrote: "The series has brutal, surprisingly great action, a meaningful central romance and unexpectedly biting commentary on religion."

== Cancellation and film ==
On December 13, 2022, creator Simon Barry revealed on Twitter that Netflix would not be renewing Warrior Nun for a third season due to low viewership, thanking the fans for the love showed to the cast and production team. Fans responded on social media, with many seeing the decision as part of a trend of discontinuing female-led shows with queer representation, known colloquially as the trope "Cancel Your Gays". Within days a grassroots fan-led campaign began to advocate for the reversal of the cancellation and renewal of the show, or for Netflix to sell the rights of the show to another streaming platform. A fan created petition on Change.org was set up in response to the cancellation by Netflix and as of January 15, 2023, has gained over 123,000 signatures.

Paul Tassi of Forbes wrote: "Netflix Cancels 'Warrior Nun,' Its Highest Audience-Scored Series Ever, For Reasons". Tassi pointed out that "Warrior Nun is a unique case in that Season 2 is the singular best-scored season of a show in Netflix history, according to Rotten Tomatoes metrics." Mike Bedard of Looper.com suggested that "there are very good reasons why other streamers would be wise to give "Warrior Nun another shot." In response to the fan-led campaign to bring the show back, Bedard said "For another streamer to pick it up would be a no-brainer. It would be an instant way to build up some good karma amongst fans and could even lead to new subscribers, which is what all these platforms need to finally turn a profit."

Barry stated on June 28, 2023, that the series had been revived, crediting the fan support in helping make it happen, but that Netflix was not involved in its revival. Barry posted a link to the website WarriorNunSaved.com showing a countdown to August 15, 2023. Executive producer Dean English confirmed on August 15 that the storyline of the series would continue in a trilogy of feature films and also teased a universe based on the series.

In April 2025, creator Barry shared an update stating that "the company [Productivity Media] that owns the movie rights has done nothing" and that it "may not exist anymore as the ceo [William Santor] died". It was also reported that the company was being investigated for mismanaging funds.
