= Thekla Reuten =

Dutch actress (b. 1975)

- Born: Thekla Simona Gelsomina Reuten; 16 September 1975 (age 51); Bussum, North Holland, Netherlands
- Occupation: Actress
- Years active: 1996-present
- Relatives: Geert Reuten (uncle); Thijs Reuten (brother)
- Website: www.theklareuten.com

Thekla Simona Gelsomina Reuten (born 16 September 1975) is a Dutch actress.

== Life and career ==
Reuten was born in Bussum, Netherlands, the daughter of a Dutch father, Joost Reuten, and an Italian mother, who was born in Benabbio near Bagni di Lucca. She studied acting at the Amsterdamse Hogeschool voor de Kunsten in Amsterdam. During the last year of her studies, she assumed leading roles in Dutch film and theatre productions. Early in her career, she won the Shooting Star Award of the Berlinale (Berlin Film Festival) for her portrayal of Lotte in the 2002 film Twin Sisters, which was nominated for the Academy Award for Best Foreign Language Film. Subsequent roles included In Bruges with Colin Farrell, and The American alongside George Clooney. Other films include Tate's Voyage, Little Crumb, Rosenstraße, and Everybody's famous!, which was nominated for an Academy Award for Best Foreign Language Film.

Reuten's television work includes the BBC's Hidden and Restless, and Showtime's Sleeper Cell. On stage, she has performed in Johan Simons's production Fall of the Gods at the Salzburg Festival and the Ruhr Triennial, as well as in Rufus Norris’s Blood Wedding at the Almeida Theatre in London, alongside Gael Garcia Bernal.

Reuten speaks five languages: German, English, French, Dutch, and Italian.

On 18 March 2019, it was announced that Reuten was cast as Jillian Salvius in the Netflix fantasy series, Warrior Nun.

She won the Rutger Hauer Award in January 2026.

== Filmography ==
- 1996: Verhalen uit de bijbel, ‘de man op de ezel' (Director: Rein van Schagen)
- 1997: Arends (Director: Jelle Nesna)
- 1998: Baantjer, episode De Cock en de moord op de heks (Director: Pollo de Pimentel)
- 1998: Tate's Voyage (Director: Paula van der Oest)
- 1998: Het 14e kippetje (Director: Hany Abu-Assad)
- 1998: Wij, Alexander (Director: Rimko Haanstra)
- 1999: De rode zwaan (Director: Martin Lagestee)
- 1999: Klokhuis (Director: Niek Barendsen and Barbera Bredero)
- 1999: Little Crumb (Director: Maria Peters)
- 1999: Moët und Chandon (Director: Marc de Cloe)
- 2000: Everybody's Famous! (Director: Dominique Deruddere)
- 2000: The Black Meteor (Director: Guido Pieters)
- 2001: Chalk (Director: Diederik van Rooijen)
- 2001: De Acteurs (Director: Bram van Splunteren)
- 2001: Una bellezza che non lascia scampo (Director: Francesca Pirani)
- 2002: Bella Bettien (Director: Hans Pos)
- 2002: Twin Sisters (Director: Ben Sombogaart)
- 2002: Spagaat (Director: Hans Pos)
- 2003: Brush with Fate (Director: Brent Shields)
- 2003: Mijn zusje Zlata (Director: Roel Welling)
- 2003: Parels & Zwijnen (Director: Diederik van Rooijen)
- 2003: Rosenstrasse (Director: Margarethe von Trotta)
- 2004: Co/Ma (Director: Roel Welling)
- 2004: De Band (Director: Albert Jan van Rees)
- 2004: De duistere diamant (Director: Rudi van den Bossche)
- 2005: Not She - Film Installation (Director: Ine Lamers)
- 2005: Smachten - Boy meets Girl Stories (Director: Mark de Cloe)
- 2006: Boks, ‘De verdwenen Van Gogh’ (Director: Hans Pos)
- 2006: Ober (Director: Alex van Warmerdam)
- 2006: Sleeper Cell, II. Season (Director: Charles S. Dutton, Leslie Libman, Nick Gomez)
- 2007: Highlander: The Source (Director: Brett Leonard)
- 2008: In Bruges (Director: Martin McDonagh)
- 2008: In Transit (Director: Tom Roberts)
- 2008: Lost - IV. Season (Director: Jack Bender)
- 2008: The Silent Army (Director: Jean van de Velde)
- 2009: Waffenstillstand (Ceasefire) (Director: Lancelot von Naso)
- 2010: Day One (Director: Alex Graves)
- 2010: The American (Director: Anton Corbijn)
- 2011: Hotel Lux (Director: Leander Haußmann)
- 2012: Hidden (Director: Niall MacCormick)
- 2012: Restless (Director: Edward Hall)
- 2013: Da geht noch was (Quality Time) (Director: Holger Haase)
- 2013: Speelmann (Director: Klaartje Quirijns)
- 2013: The Dinner (Director: Menno Meyjes)
- 2015: Atlantic. (Director: Jan-Willem van Ewijk)
- 2015: De Reünie (Director: Menno Meyjes)
- 2015: Home Suite Home (Director: Jeroen Houben) (short film)
- 2015: L’Angelo di Sarajevo (Director: Enzo Monteleone)
- 2015: Schone Handen (Director: Tjebbo Penning)
- 2015: The Legend of Longwood (Director: Lisa Mulcahy)
- 2017: Stan Lee's Lucky Man
- 2018: Red Sparrow
- 2020: Marionette (Director: Elbert van Strien)
- 2020: Warrior Nun
- 2022: Narcosis
- 2024: Citadel: Diana
- 2025: Our Girls

== Theater (selection) ==
- 1997: Susn by Herbert Achternbusch as 'Suus' at Brakke Grond Atsterdat, Festival aan zee Oostende and Theater Kikker Utrecht (Director: Jeroen Wilems)
- 1998: The Comedy of Seduction by Arthur Schnitzler as 'Gilda' at Het Nationale Toneel (Director: Ger Thijs)
- 1999: The Dresser by Ronald Harwood as 'Irene' at Hummelinck Stuurman (Director: Tom Jansen)
- 1999: Fall of the Gods by Luchino Visconti and Tom Blokdijk as 'Bediende', 'Lisa' and 'Dirndl' at Hollandia and zu den Salzburger Festspiele and zur Ruhr Triennale (Director: Johan Simons and Paul Koek)
- 2001: The House of Bernarda Alba by Federico García Lorca as 'Adela' at Het Nationale Toneel (Director: Johan Doesburg)
- 2004: Braatbos by Willem Jan Otten as 'Nana' at Het Toneel Speelt (Director: Willem van de Sande Bakhuyzen)
- 2005: Blood Wedding by Federico García Lorca as 'Braut' at Almeida Theater (Director: Rufus Norris)

== Voice-over (dubbing) ==
- 2004: Shark Tale (Dutch Voice-Over of Angie) (Director: Kellie Allred)
- 2007: Bee Movie (Dutch Voice-Over of Vanessa Bloome) (Director: Steve Hickner, Simon J. Smith)
- 2014: How to Train Your Dragon (Dutch Voice-Over ‘Valka’) (Director: Dean DeBlois)

== Awards (selection) ==
- 1997: Encouragement Award at Belgian Theatre Festival 'Theater aan Zee' for Susn
- 1997: Philip Morris Scholarship (Nomination) for Susn
- 1998: Golden Calf Award (Nomination) for Best Actress in De Trip van het Teetje
- 1998: NOS Culture Award (Nomination) for Best Actress
- 2004: European Shooting Star of the Berlinale for outstanding performance in Twin Sisters
- 2009: Rembrandt Award (Nomination) for Best Actress in The Silent Army
