= Barry Lyga =

American writer

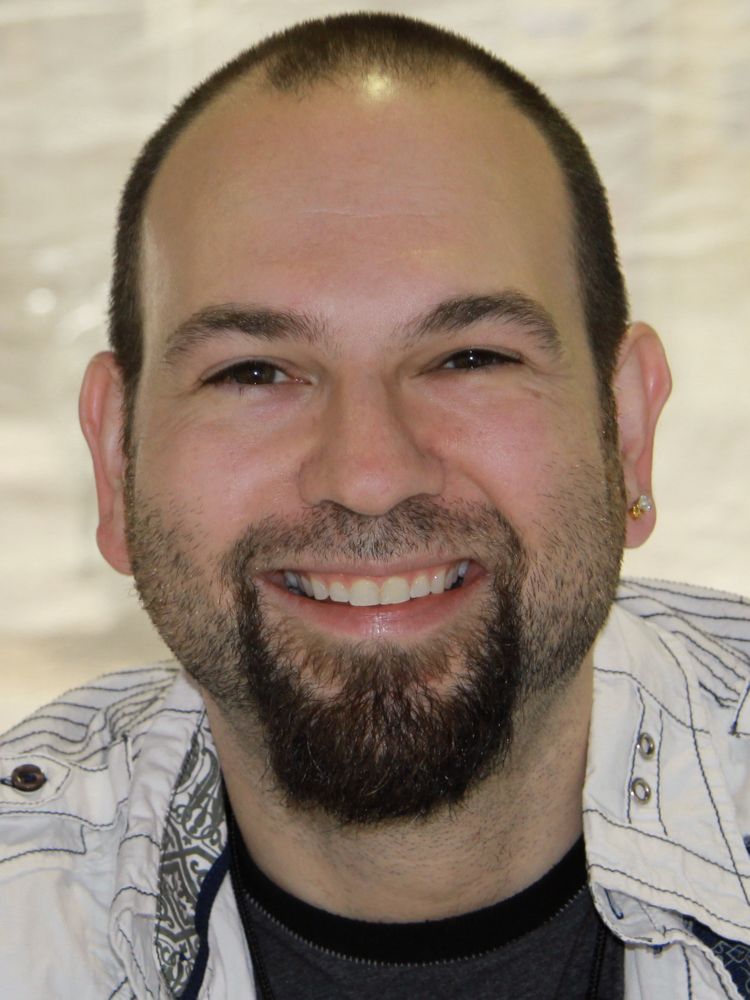
- Lyga at the 2011 Texas Book Festival
- Born: September 11, 1971 (age 54); New York
- Occupation: Writer
- Writing career
- Period: 2006–present
- Genre: Young adult fiction
- Notable works: Boy Toy; The Astonishing Adventures of Fanboy and Goth Girl
- Website: barrylyga.com

Barry Lyga (born September 11, 1971) is an American young adult novelist and short story writer. He lives in New York. Lyga majored in English at Yale receiving his BA in 1993. He then spent ten years working at Diamond Comic Distributors after having spent his teenage years immersed in comic books. During this period, Lyga had seen his short stories published. His book I Hunt Killers was released in March 2012 and Archvillain was released in October 2013.

== Career ==
The Astonishing Adventures of Fanboy and Goth Girl is Lyga's first novel and was published in 2006. The story arose from Lyga's youthful exploration of plotting and characterization he found in comic books. Lyga acknowledges that Fanboy and Goth Girl is autobiographical in that "a lot of what Fanboy describes is [what] I went through ... the book has autobiographical elements, but it also has a lot of wish fulfillment." Lyga says that "the entire book just popped into my head all at once." Touching upon the book's violent subject matter, Lyga says,"I didn't want to shy away from the violent fantasies. We're living in the post-Columbine world." The threat of violence, though, is just a threat and "the lack of bloodshed was a pleasant surprise" as one book reviewer, Spencer Korson, said.

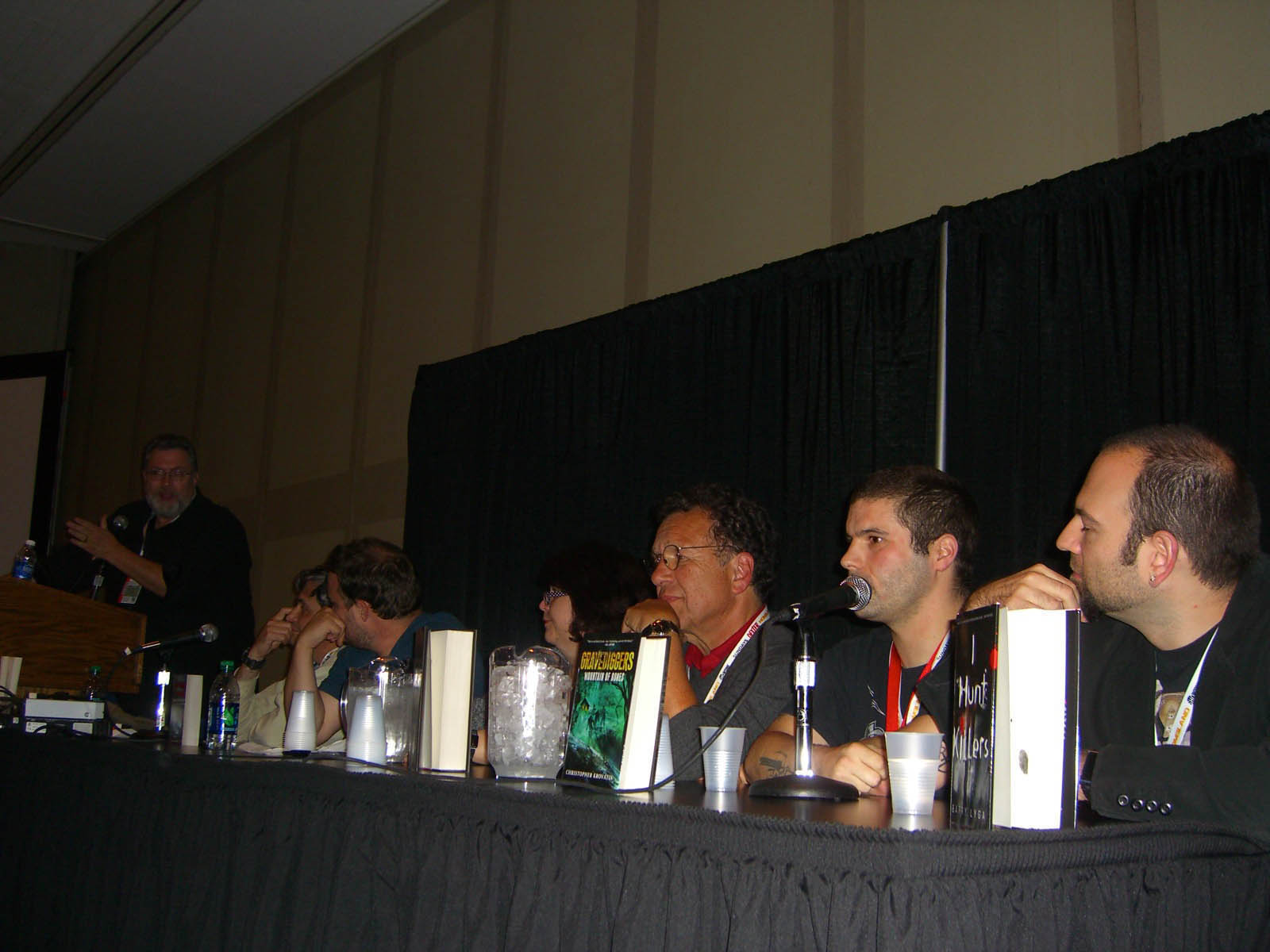
Lyga, at right, speaking on a zombie panel discussion at the 2012 New York Comic Con

Fanboy and Goth Girl has earned starred reviews and made the School Library Journal's 2006 Best Books list. Kirkus Reviews calls it "authentic and well-written". All reviews, though, mention that the "story unfolds slowly." The story is darkly comic. It is told in the first person point of view of Fanboy, a 15-year-old boy who maintains an internal, sarcastic and funny commentary throughout the story. Reviewer Gillian Engberg described Fanboy and Goth Girl as a "realistic, contemporary story of bullying and a teen's private escape." Fanboy is obsessed with comics – graphic novels as he corrects Goth Girl – and a sub-plot trip to a "comic-book convention ... feels authentic."

Publishers Weekly reported that Jeremiah S. Chechik, director of Benny & Joon, is negotiating for film rights.

Boy Toy is Lyga's second young adult novel. Reviewer Kristin Kloberdanz said that it was an "astounding portrayal of what it is like to be the young male victim." The book depicts Josh, who is about to graduate high school, dealing with the news that Eve, an attractive female history teacher who manipulated him into a sexual relationship when he was twelve, is soon to be released from prison. Jack Martin wrote for The New York Times that the novel is an "intense, intricately drawn portrait... Lyga fuses Josh's outwardly aggressive jock sensibility with an inner fragility – similar to the geeky isolation of the hero in his well-received first novel, The Astonishing Adventures of Fanboy and Goth Girl." He concludes that even though "the reader never gets much of a fix on her [Eve's] motives", there is an appropriate and palpable discomfort that comes from reading as it "vividly explores the gray areas between love, lust, right and wrong."

Hero-Type is Lyga's third young adult novel, also set in Brookdale. Kevin Ross (Kross to his friends) saved Leah Muldoon's life, and the town treats him as a hero. However, when patriotic Brookdale witnesses him removing "Support the Troops" magnets from his car, he's set in a compromising position. The town turns against him, and he engages in a mental and verbal fight with a classmate over the rights and wrongs and simple interpretations and beliefs of what it means to be patriotic.

Goth Girl Rising is the direct sequel to The Astonishing Adventures of Fanboy and Goth Girl. Set six months after the events of the first novel Goth Girl Rising follows Kyra as she returns home from Maryland Mental Health Unit.

In 2015 Lyga co-wrote the novel After the Red Rain with Peter Facinelli and Robert DeFranco. It is set on a future Earth whose population is grappling with dwindling resources.

Lyga's first graphic novel Mangaman, a meta-fictional tale of East meet West, as a manga boy breaks through a hole in reality and meets a real girl, was illustrated by artist Colleen Doran. It was published in 2011, and received a starred review in Kirkus Reviews.

In 2018, Lyga wrote Thanos: Titan Consumed, a novel in conjunction with the Marvel Cinematic Universe which tells the story of Marvel Comics villain Thanos.

== Bibliography ==
=== Novels ===
==== Standalone ====
- —— (2007). Boy Toy (hardcover 1st ed.). HMH Books for Young Readers. pp. 1–410. ISBN 9780618723935.
- —— (2008). Hero-Type (hardcover 1st ed.). HMH Books for Young Readers. pp. 1–304. ISBN 9780547076638.
- —— (2013). Unsoul'd (ebook ed.). B & Z Books. pp. 1–253. ISBN 9780615879970.
- —— (2015). After the Red Rain (hardcover 1st ed.). Little, Brown Books for Young Readers. pp. 1–392. ISBN 9780316406031.
- —— (2016). The Secret Sea (hardcover 1st ed.). Feiwel & Friends. pp. 1–448. ISBN 9781250072832.
- —— (2017). Bang (hardcover 1st ed.). Little, Brown Books for Young Readers. pp. 1–304. ISBN 9780316315500.
- ——; Baden, Morgan (2019). Hive (hardcover 1st ed.). Kids Can Press. pp. 1–416. ISBN 9781525300608.
- —— (2021). Time Will Tell (hardcover 1st ed.). Little, Brown Books. pp. 1–432. ISBN 9780316537780.

==== The Astonishing Adventures of Fanboy and Goth Girl ====
1. —— (2006). The Astonishing Adventures of Fanboy and Goth Girl. HMH Books for Young Readers. ISBN 9780618723928.
2. —— (2009). Goth Girl Rising. Clarion. ISBN 9780547403083.

==== Archvillain ====
1. —— (2010). Archvillain (hardcover 1st ed.). Scholastic Press. pp. 1–192. ISBN 9780545196499.
2. —— (2012). The Mad Mask (hardcover 1st ed.). Scholastic Inc. pp. 1–240. ISBN 9780545196512.
3. —— (2013). Yesterday Again (hardcover 1st ed.). Scholastic Press. pp. 1–352. ISBN 9780545196543.

==== I Hunt Killers ====
1. —— (2012). I Hunt Killers (hardcover 1st ed.). Little, Brown and Co. pp. 1–359. ISBN 9780316125840.
2. —— (2013). Game (hardcover 1st ed.). Little, Brown Books for Young Readers. pp. 1–520. ISBN 9780316125871.
3. —— (2014). Blood of My Blood (hardcover 1st ed.). Little, Brown Books for Young Readers. pp. 1–468. ISBN 9780316198707.

==== Marvel ====
- (2009) Wolverine: Worst Day Ever.

==== DC / CW Flash ====
1. (2017). The Flash: Hocus Pocus.
2. (2018). The Flash: Johnny Quick.
3. (2018). The Flash: The Tornado Twins.
4. (2019). The Flash: Green Arrow's Perfect Shot.
5. (2020). The Flash: Supergirl's Sacrifice.
6. (2021). The Flash: The Legends of Forever.

== See also ==
- Goth subculture
