= Alba Baptista =

Portuguese actress (born 1997)

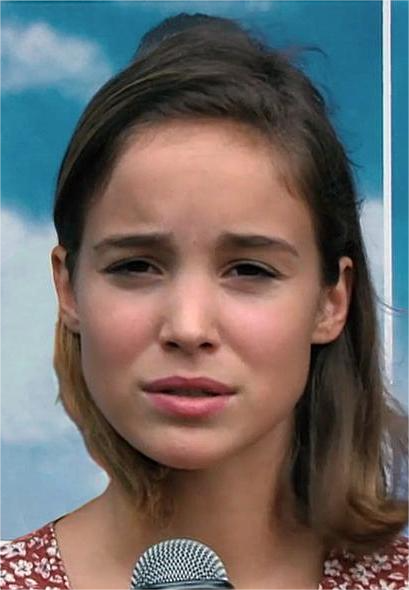
- Baptista in 2018
- Born: 10 July 1997 (age 29); Lisbon, Portugal
- Occupation: Actress
- Years active: 2012–present
- Spouse: Chris Evans (m. 2023)
- Children: 1
- Relatives: Scott Evans (brother-in-law); Mike Capuano (uncle-in-law)

Alba Baptista (born 10 July 1997) is a Portuguese actress. She began her career in Portugal and appeared in multiple Portuguese series and films. From 2020 to 2022, she starred in the Netflix series Warrior Nun, which marked her English-language debut.

== Early life ==
Baptista was born in Lisbon, Portugal. Her Portuguese mother met her father, a Brazilian engineer from Rio de Janeiro, when she worked as a translator in Brazil. She attended a German school in Portugal. Around age 15, she decided to become an actress.

== Career ==
At age 16, Baptista began her career as the main character in Simão Cayatte's short film Miami. She furthered her career in the Portuguese series A Criação and the telenovelas A Impostora and Jogo Duplo.Her film work includes Caminhos Magnétykos by Edgar Pêra, Equinócio by Ivo Ferreira, and Patrick (2019), which was premiered at the San Sebastián International Film Festival.

From 2020 to 2022, she played the lead role of Ava in the Netflix series Warrior Nun, which marked her English–language debut.

In 2022, she played Natasha in Mrs. Harris Goes to Paris.

== Personal life ==
Baptista married American actor Chris Evans on 9 September 2023, in a private at-home ceremony on Cape Cod in Massachusetts. She gave birth to their child in October 2025.

== Filmography ==
Key
†	Denotes films that have not yet been released

=== Film ===
Year	Title	Role	Notes
2012	Amanhã é um Novo Dia		Short film
2014	Miami	Raquel	Short film
2018	Flutuar		Short film
2018	Leviano	Carolina Paixão	
2018	Equinócio		Short film
2018	Linhas de Sangue	Elsa Schneider	
2018	Caminhos Magnétykos	Catarina	
2018	Summerfest	Laura	Short film
2018	Nero	Clara	Short film
2019	Imagens Proibidas	Catarina	
2019	Patrick	Marta	
2020	Fatima	Senhora Lopes Daughter	
2022	L'enfant	Branca	
2022	Mrs. Harris Goes to Paris	Natasha	
2022	Nunca Nada Aconteceu	Maria	
2023	Amelia's Children	Amélia	
2025	Borderline	Penny Pascal	
2026	Mother Mary	Miel Contrera	
2027	Voltron †	TBA	Post-production
TBA	Flesh of the Gods †	TBA	Post-production

=== Television ===
Year	Title	Role	Notes
2014–2015	Jardins Proibidos	Inês Correia	Main cast
2016–2017	A Impostora	Beatriz Varela	Main cast
2017	Filha da Lei	Sara	Main cast
2017	Madre Paula	Ana	Recurring role
2017	A Criação	Ratinha	Main cast
2017	Sim, Chef!	Sónia	1 episode
2018	País Irmão	Mulher Divinal	1 episode
2017–2018	Jogo Duplo	Leonor Neves	Main cast
2020–2022	Warrior Nun	Ava Silva	Title role
