= Lorena Andrea =

British actress (born 1994)

- Born: Lorena Andrea Mateo; April 12, 1994 (age 32); Camden, London, England
- Occupation: Actress
- Years active: 2007–present

Lorena Andrea Mateo (born April 12, 1994) is a British actress. She is known for her role as Sister Lilith in the Netflix fantasy series Warrior Nun (2020–2022).

== Early life ==
Andrea was born in North London Borough of Camden to Spanish and Colombian parents and speaks fluent English and Spanish. She lived in Spain for three years before returning to England. She was a competitive swimmer growing up and a member of Anaconda Swimming Club near Tufnell Park. She took acting classes at the Anna Scher Theatre. She appeared in the CBBC show The Pod in 2007.

== Career ==
In 2016, Andrea joined the cast of her first feature film Jesters as Sofia, a Colombian student, which premiered in 2018. She also co-starred in the 2017 films Unhinged and House on Elm Lake. That same year, she appeared in Michael Noer's 2017 rendition of the 1973 classic Papillon as Lali, a Wayuu Native American woman who rescues Papillon Charlie Hunnam and nurses him back to health. Andrea starred as Lotsee opposite Chris Routhe in the 2019 western No Man's Land. In 2020, she began starring as Sister Lilith in the Netflix fantasy series Warrior Nun. She played mermaid princess Perla known as Andrina, one of Ariel’s sisters, in the 2023 live-action film adaptation of Disney's The Little Mermaid. She played the role of the Good Queen in the 2025 live action remake, Snow White.

== Filmography ==
=== Film ===
Year	Title	Role	Notes
2015	Lia	Hannah	Short film
2016	Salaam - StDenis2015	Hasna	Short film
2016	Lithium	Lola	Short film
2016	Signs of Silence	Chesney	Short film
2017	Papillon	Lali	
2017	House on Elm Lake	Crystal	
2017	Unhinged	Thalia	
2017	Grace of Mine	Sparkle	Short film
2018	Jesters	Sofia	
2019	No Man's Land	Lotsee	
2020	Infamous Six	Amanda	
2020	Virtual Death Match	Tamzin	
2023	The Little Mermaid	Perla	
2025	Snow White	Good Queen	
2026	Fortitude	TBA	Post-production

=== Television ===
Year	Title	Role	Notes
2007	The Pod		
2020 – 2022	Warrior Nun	Sister Lilith	Main role

== Stage ==
Year	Title	Role	Notes
2011	Justice	Reporter	Precinct Theatre, London
2012	Coming Out	Sabrina	Precinct Theatre, London
