= Simon Barry =

Canadian writer, director, producer (b. 1966)

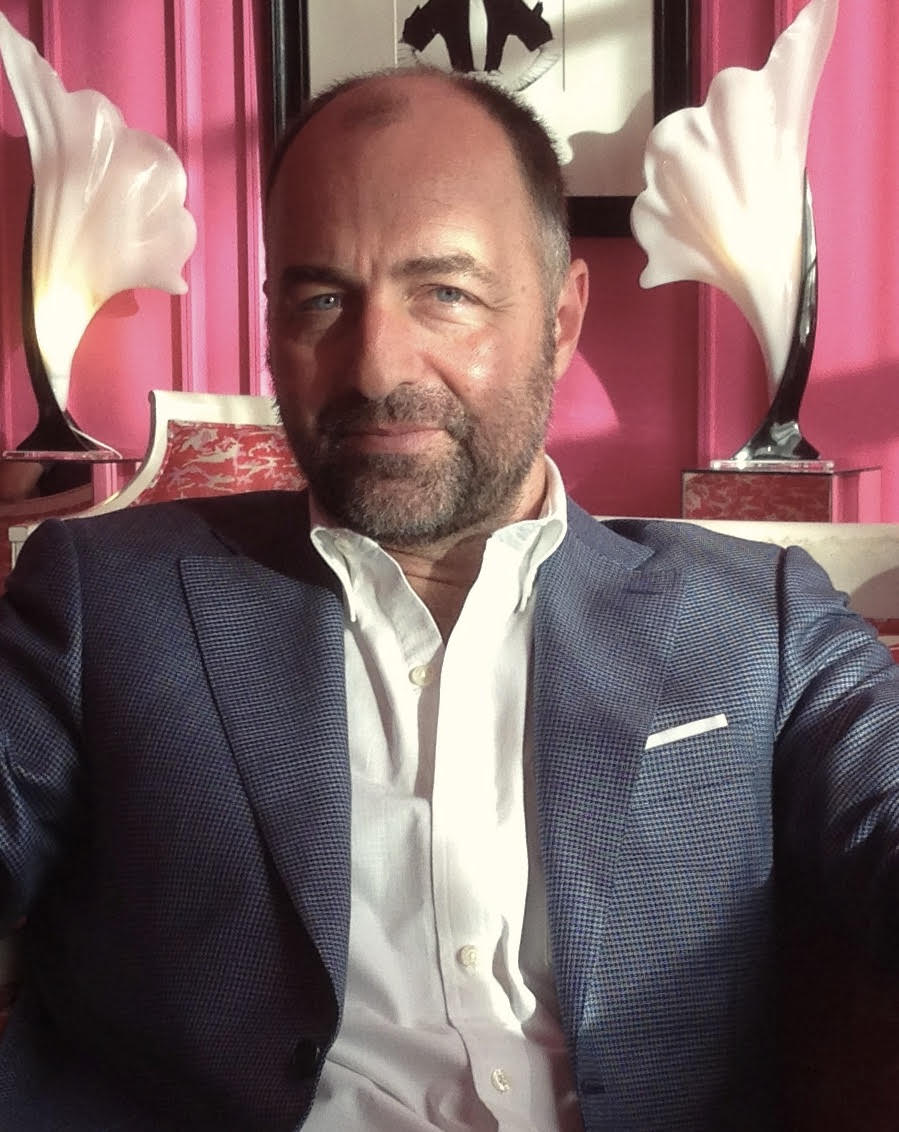
- Born: Simon Davis Barry; 25 September 1966 (age 59); London, UK
- Education: University of British Columbia
- Occupations: film and television producer, writer, director
- Years active: 1990–present

Simon Barry (born 25 September 1966) is a Canadian screenwriter, film producer, director and television producer.

== Career ==
Barry is best known for his work on the Canadian sci-fi series Continuum (2012–2015). In 2013, building on his track record on Continuum, he joined Stephen Hegyes as co-founders of Reality Distortion Field, a Vancouver-based production company that develops original content for sci-fi, horror, and fantasy genres.

Through Reality Distortion Field, Barry is show-runner and executive producer for the Netflix fantasy series Warrior Nun (2020).

In May 2024, Barry was reported to be showrunner for a live-action English TV series adaptation of the manga Kakegurui, which will be titled Bet.

== Filmography ==
=== Feature credits ===
Year	Film	Writer	Producer	Director
1998	The Falling	Yes	No	No
2000	The Art of War	Yes	No	No
2011	Hamlet	No	Yes	No

=== Television credits ===
Year	Show	Writer	Producer	Director	Notes
2012–2015	Continuum	Yes	Yes	Yes	
2016–2021	Van Helsing	Yes	Yes	Yes	
2017	Ghost Wars	Yes	Yes	Yes	
2017–2018	Bad Blood	Yes	Yes	No	
2017–2019	Creeped Out	No	No	No	Executive creative consultant
2020–2022	Warrior Nun	Yes	Yes	Yes	Executive producer and showrunner
2025–present	Bet	Yes	Yes	Yes	Executive producer and showrunner
