= Continuum season 1 =

Continuum
- Season 1
- American DVD cover art
- No. of episodes: 10

Release
- Original network: Showcase
- Original release: May 27 – August 5, 2012

Season chronology
- Next → Season 2

The first season of the Showcase television series Continuum premiered on May 27, 2012 and concluded on August 5, 2012. The series is created by Simon Barry. The series centers on Kiera Cameron (Rachel Nichols) as she time travels from 2077 to 2012 with a group of terrorists, and attempts to find a way home. All the episode titles in this season use the word "Time."

== Cast ==
=== Main ===
- Rachel Nichols as CPS "Protector"/Special Agent Kiera Cameron
- Victor Webster as Detective Carlos Fonnegra
- Erik Knudsen as a young Alec Sadler
- Stephen Lobo as Matthew Kellog
- Tony Amendola as Edouard Kagame
- Roger Cross as Travis Verta
- Lexa Doig as Sonya Valentine
- Omari Newton as Lucas Ingram
- Luvia Petersen as Jasmine Garza
- Jennifer Spence as Detective Betty Robertson
- Brian Markinson as Inspector Dillon

=== Recurring ===
- William B. Davis as an elderly Alec Sadler
- Janet Kidder as Ann Sadler
- Michael Rogers as Roland Randol
- Richard Harmon as Julian Randol
  - Gerry Nairn as an elderly Julian Randol/Theseus
- John Reardon as Greg Cameron
- Sean Michael Kyer as Sam Cameron
- Terry Chen as Curtis Chen
- Mike Dopud as Stefan Jaworski
- Jonathan Walker as Martin Bradley
- Beatrice Sallis as Edouard Kagame's mother
- Tahmoh Penikett as Jim Martin

== Episodes ==
No. overall	No. in season	Title	Directed by	Written by	Original release date	Can. viewers (millions)
1	1	"A Stitch in Time"	Jon Cassar	Simon Barry	May 27, 2012	0.900
In the year 2077, eight terrorists from the group Liber8, perpetrators of an act that killed thousands, avoid execution by making a time jump back to 2012. Protector Kiera Cameron, a law enforcement officer who tries to intervene, is inadvertently drawn into the jump. Soon after her arrival, she finds herself in contact with and befriends 17-year-old hacker Alec Sadler, who will one day create the technology that the world of 2077 is built upon, and will control future society. One of the terrorists, Lucas Ingram, is quickly arrested, but the remainder arm themselves and start to blend into society while carrying out their agenda: to start a war. They begin stealing arms and robbing banks. Meanwhile, Kiera, who has lost everything, gives herself a new mission: to hunt down the insurgents. She takes on a new identity and manages to infiltrate and join the Vancouver Police Department by posing as an officer from Portland PD. She begins working with Vancouver officer Carlos Fonnegra to track down the terrorists and stop their violent plans – which begin with an attack on the police station to free Ingram.
2	2	"Fast Times"	Jon Cassar	Jeff King	June 3, 2012	0.670
Kiera tries to find the members of Liber8 before they do more damage. They are trying to return to their own time: knowing this, Kiera has every intention of travelling with them to reunite with her family. Their first attempt fails, but when Liber8 kidnap a university physicist, Kiera knows exactly where to find them. Meanwhile, her cover as a Portland police officer is blown and she is arrested by her VPD partner, Carlos. When she discovers the Liber8 group is planning a second attempt, Kiera frees herself and escapes to approach them alone. Ultimately the attempt fails, and a despondent Kiera is forced to accept she may be stuck in 2012. At her request, Alec creates a profile for her that convinces the police she is a government agent so deep undercover that they can't figure out who she really works for. One member of Liber8, Matthew Kellog, has decided to stay and not return to his own time.
3	3	"Wasting Time"	David Frazee	Simon Barry	June 10, 2012	0.531
Kellog, disaffected with Liber8, meets Kiera and offers an uneasy alliance based on mutual benefit. Kiera and Carlos investigate two murders connected only by the victims' injuries: a cylindrical hole in the base of the skull, through which the pituitary gland has been removed. The victims' DNA reveals a gene that in the future will be used to create a super-soldier, so Kiera knows Liber8 is responsible. In fact, the glands are needed to synthesize a cure for Travis, who is ill and near death. (Travis is de facto leader in the absence of Edouard Kagame, believed not to have survived the jump.) Curtis Chen, suspicious of Kellog, forces his way to a rendezvous with Carlos. After a fight, Chen is killed by the failsafe on Kiera's gun when he tries to use it against her. Travis is cured and Kellog, now expelled from Liber8, promises to help Kiera against the group.
4	4	"A Matter of Time"	Michael Rohl	Sam Egan	June 17, 2012	0.389
Kiera and Carlos investigate the murder of Professor Martin Ames, a scientist who was developing an antimatter containment device (a step towards fusion energy, widespread in 2077). The device backfired and killed him. Ames' graduate student, Shane Mathers, discovers that all of the professor's files have been stolen. Suspicion falls on Dr. Melissa Dobeck, a former partner who fell out with Ames over safety issues: she denies involvement. The investigation is thwarted when the military takes over on national security grounds. However, the pair uncover a prior claim of intellectual property theft, enabling them to continue investigating. Meanwhile, Liber8's leader, Kagame, suddenly arrives in 2012 and quickly sets out to rejoin his group. Also, Kellog has made a fortune in the stock market, by leveraging information. He helps Maddie by paying off the mortgage on her house. She suspects that he wants something in return, but he insists he is only repaying her father's kindness. (In fact, she is his grandmother, but he keeps that fact secret.) Kiera is led to an intensely personal moral dilemma: whether to prosecute the guilty person or to preserve the future she desperately wants to go home to.
5	5	"A Test of Time"	Patrick Williams	Jeff King	June 24, 2012	0.473
Kagame's return begins with a reset of Liber8's agenda, away from violence and towards blending into the community and fostering their revolution through co-opting existing structures. But they have a vulnerability – the possibility that if their ancestors, living in this time, are murdered, they might cease to exist. Due to Kiera's interference, Liber8 have decided to deal with her, and Kagame has a plan: by killing her grandmother Lily Jones, Kiera will never be born – getting rid of Kiera once and for all, and also testing the theory, with Kiera and her grandmother as the guinea pigs. The first woman they kill by the name of Lily turns out to be the wrong woman and when Kiera hears the news she knows exactly what Kagame's up to. She sets out to find her grandmother but isn't quite ready for the pregnant and homeless punk she finds living on the street. Kellog gives her a heads up, but a suspicious Kagame has already taken out insurance against him – Kellog's grandmother, Maddie. The game they are playing soon becomes tit for tat with no possible winner.
6	6	"Time's Up"	Rachel Talalay	Jeremy Smith & Jonathan Lloyd Walker	July 8, 2012	0.404
Kagame pursues step one of his new agenda – win the intellectuals and the grass roots dissenters. The Liber8 freedom fighters actively support and encourage violent protests, using present-day anarchists to riot outside the company headquarters of a major corporation; Exotrol. During the protest, the CEO of Exotrol, Henrietta Sherman, is kidnapped by Liber8. Kiera suspects Liber8 was behind the violence at the protest, to provide cover for the kidnapping. A video of Sherman is soon on the Internet, revealing her kidnappers demand for $20 million in cash. Kagame decides to put the decision to kill or free her to an Internet vote – confirming to Kiera that Liber8 have changed their tactics and are trying to get the public on their side by getting them to vote whether she lives or dies and to expose the truth. Kiera and Carlos race a literal ticking clock in order to save Sherman from the public's wrath. It later turns out that someone inside Exotrol may be working with Liber8. While Kiera is away, Kellog breaks into her apartment and steals the piece of the time travel device. Alec faces his own dilemma when he realizes that his step-brother, Julian, is one of the violent protesters.
7	7	"The Politics of Time"	Patrick Williams	Sara B. Cooper	July 15, 2012	0.427
A high-stakes Port of Vancouver Union Election gives Kiera her first taste of contemporary political intrigue. First, the issue of Kiera's trust and loyalty of her partner come into question as evidence points to Carlos in the death of an investigative reporter: Carlos finds himself investigating the murder of journalist Alicia Fuentes, who he slept with the night before her death. Carlos had received a call from his lifelong old friend, Jim Martin, who is running as the leading candidate in the polls for election as the head of the local dock workers union, on a platform of cleaning up the union's corrupt practices. Martin was having an argument with Alicia, who was about to blow the lid off a dirty secret Martin may have been hiding. Carlos knew Alicia, picked her up and after dinner spent most of the night at her apartment. When they find her dead the next morning, he tells no one, not even Kiera, that he was there until about 1:30. Meanwhile, Alec is trying to fix Kiera's suit, and with some of its capability restored, she gets a lead on the killer, and also finds that the piece of the time travel device is missing, and knows Kellog has to be the one who took it. While covertly and desperately trying to clear both men and find out who killed Alicia, Kiera will learn first-hand the lengths one will go to get elected – and the allies they associate with once victory is achieved.
8	8	"Playtime"	Paul Shapiro	Andrea Stevens	July 22, 2012	N/A
Kiera and Carlos investigate when two murder-suicides happen in the same day – where the killers immediately committed suicide after eliminating their victims. The only tie between the two is a local computer gaming company, where both were software testers, that's been doing more than just developing video games; it's developing an immersive holographic program and Kiera decides to try it out. The effects on her are devastating – Kiera's HUD system short circuits and her internal electronics go haywire. Kagame and Liber8 attempt to take control of her, while she is in this bad state. Alec works frantically to reboot her processors and manages to save Kiera from killing her partner. At the same time, Liber8 discovers who is behind Kiera – Alec, while Alec also finds a previously unknown file in Kiera's systems – discovering it is actually a message from his future self, addressed to him.
9	9	"Family Time"	William Waring	Floyd Kane	July 29, 2012	N/A
Alerted to a bulk purchase of alarming quantities of ammonium nitrate (a fertilizer used in explosives and agriculture), Kiera and Carlos visit Roland Randol's farm to check up on such an excessively large purchase of farm fertilizer and identify who's been purchasing it. Having tracked the source to Roland's farm, Kiera is somewhat taken aback to find Alec there, not realizing that Randol is his step-father. Kiera is shown that her CMR suit is about to be restored to full functionality by Alec. Randol assures them that there has been a mistake and that he never purchased as much fertilizer as they claim. When they check the storage shed, however, they find a truck rigged with the chemicals and ready for use as a bomb. It's Randol's son Julian and his friends who are looking to make a statement, even though the elder Randol has never preached violence. Events spiral and mushroom into a tense armed standoff – Carlos is shot and he and Kiera are taken prisoner – but Kiera and Alec try to gain control of the situation.
10	10	"Endtime"	Patrick Williams	Simon Barry	August 5, 2012	N/A
The morning after sleeping with Kellog, Kiera steals back his piece of the time travel device. Kiera meets Jason, who convinces her he was in the 2077 control room when the time travel device went off, sending him back to 1992. Jason informs Kiera that privateers, other parties from the future, are at work in the present. As a student of history he has been waiting for this particular day – when a bomb in an office building will kill many people and start the evolution into the world of the future. Kagame temporarily captures young Alec, telling him that future Alec had guided his actions. When CSIS Agent Gardiner and his team join with Vancouver police to deal with the bomb threat, they evacuate the office building they think will be targeted by Liber8. Kagame enters the building across the plaza and activates a suicide bomb, destroying the tower. CSIS Agent Gardiner sees Kiera and Alec protected from the blast by a forcefield, then makes eye contact as she activates her invisibility system. Kagame left instructions for Sonya to deliver cash to his mother (bomb day is also Kagame's day of birth), succeed him as leader of Liber8, and eliminate Travis. A flash forward reveals that the bombing is part of a plan that was hatched by the Alec of 2077, who specifically masterminded both Liber8's and Kiera's transport to the past. Kiera is despondent when she learns that Jason can not return them to the future. Alec calls to say he has finally decrypted the message from his future self.

== DVD release ==
Continuum: Season One
Set details: 10 episodes; Region 1, 2 & 4 – 4-disc DVD set; Features: Anamorphic Widescreen (1.78:1); Dolby Digital 5.1 English audio; Subtitles: English		Bonus features: Featurette; Meet the Makers, Protectors and Terrorists; My Scenes	
Release dates:	Region 1	Region 2	Region 4
Release dates:	March 26, 2013	January 28, 2013	April 24, 2013
