= Continuum season 2 =

Continuum
- Season 2
- American DVD cover art
- No. of episodes: 13

Release
- Original network: Showcase
- Original release: April 21 – August 4, 2013

Season chronology
- ← Previous; Season 1 Next → Season 3

The second season of the Showcase television series Continuum premiered on April 21, 2013 and concluded on August 4, 2013. The series is created by Simon Barry. The series centers on Kiera Cameron (Rachel Nichols) as she time travels from 2077 to 2012 with a group of terrorists, and attempts to find a way home. All the episodes titles in this season use the word "Second."

== Cast and characters ==
=== Main ===
- Rachel Nichols as CPS "Protector"/Agent Kiera Cameron
- Victor Webster as Detective Carlos Fonnegra
- Erik Knudsen as a young Alec Sadler
- Roger Cross as Travis Verta
- Stephen Lobo as Matthew Kellog
- Lexa Doig as Sonya Valentine
- Omari Newton as Lucas Ingram
- Luvia Petersen as Jasmine Garza
- Brian Markinson as Inspector Dillon
- Jennifer Spence as Betty Robertson
- Richard Harmon as Julian Randol/Theseus

=== Recurring ===
- Magda Apanowicz as Emily
- John Cassini as Marco
- William B. Davis as an elderly Alec Sadler
- Hugh Dillon as Escher/Marc Sadler
- Janet Kidder as Ann Sadler
- Darcy Laurie as Detective Martinez
- Tahmoh Penikett as Jim Martin
- Adam Greydon Reid as Clayton
- Ian Tracey as Jason Sadler
- Nicholas Lea as Agent Gardiner

== Episodes ==
The season's premiere episode received 378,000 viewers.

No. overall	No. in season	Title	Directed by	Written by	Original release date
11	1	"Second Chances"	Pat Williams	Simon Barry	April 21, 2013
Following the events of the Season One finale, Kiera decides to work on the edge of the law, getting support and resources from her friends at Vancouver P.D., while keeping their hands clean of her tactics. Alec is at odds over the death of his step father, arrest of his step brother, and the message from his future self. He moves in with some buddies, gets a job at a Memory Express hi-tech store, and refuses to answer Kiera's calls. When Vancouver's mayor is assassinated, Kiera works on the case with her former police department partner, Carlos Fonnegra, with CSIS Agent Gardiner dogging her for answers about her forcefield and invisibility. Kiera eventually gets Alec to call her and help out, also returning to the police when Carlos points out that her recent capture of a gang member may be jeopardized when the case goes to court due to her unaffiliated status. Gardiner catches up with Kiera when she is investigating the apartment from which the assassin fired the shots and demands answers with a gun. Kiera sarcastically tells him that she is a time traveler from 2077, but he does not believe her. Before the conversation can go further, Fonnegra shows up with backup. Kiera tells Alec she will confront and destroy Liber8, and its growing band of 2013 followers, to preserve the future. Alec is uncertain, asking if they should trust the message from his future self (Kiera says it is 50/50). A flash forward finally reveals the message that Alec and Kiera have seen - Though Alec 2077 is proud of the tech-smart legacy that "their" father taught them, he regrets his part in helping the corporate-dominated future unfold, and young Alec is the only chance to stop it. Unknown to Kiera and Alec 2013, Alec 2077 had loaded data directly into Kiera 2077's brain chips (CMR).
12	2	"Split Second"	Pat Williams	Simon Barry	April 28, 2013
Travis survived his shooting by Sonya at the end of Season 1 and was jailed in the same prison as Julian. A group of skinheads try to intimidate Julian and Travis defends him. As a result, he is to be transferred to a different location. This is a part of a plan by Sonya to kill him. The Vancouver PD is worried about an attempt to free Travis during the transfer, so a decoy convoy is sent out, with Kiera and Fonegra traveling with Travis in the real paddy-wagon. Both the decoy and the real prisoner transfer vehicle are attacked, by remotely detonated bomb and remotely controlled machine gun in the case of the decoy. While Kiera is trying to drive the wagon after the driver is shot by a pursuing vehicle, Travis breaks free of his restraints and fights with Fonegra in the back. After shaking off an attack by men in a car, they are chased by a helicopter and take refuge in a road tunnel. The helicopter lands in front of them and the car approaches from behind. The men in the helicopter fire a rocket-propelled grenade at the car, killing its occupants and then proceed to attack Kiera and Carlos with automatic rifles. After running out of ammunition, Kiera uses her suit to provide a force-field to protect her and Carlos as they flee. Travis is freed and Garza turns out to be part of the helicopter team. Meanwhile, Kellogg approaches Alec with a proposed partnership, which Alec at first refuses because he is worried that it would lead to helping create the future that his future self asked him to avoid. In the end, he reconsiders after being told by a customer to clean up the customer's child's spilled slushie. Gardiner thinks Kiera is the mole feeding Liber8 information from the police department and confronts her. Kiera suggests to Carlos that Gardiner might be the mole.
13	3	"Second Thoughts"	William Waring	Sam Egan	May 5, 2013
Liber8's internal power struggle takes a violent turn as Sonya and Travis recruit gangs as their weapons. Kiera investigates a new (to 2013) street drug that she recognizes from the future. The drug, called "flash" in 2013, is administered by eye drops and allows the user to remember vividly events from the past. Alec is part of a group in a car in which the driver had taken the drug. It crashes and Alec ends up with an arm in a sling. He was also given a plastic ampule of the drug but had not taken it. Kiera learns that Sonya is paying the gang she had recruited to kill Travis with flash. Kiera and Carlos track one of the gang members to the lab where it is being produced and a gunfight ensues in which many of the gang members present are killed. Sonya is there and targets Kiera, but neither is successful in their attempts to kill the other. Travis calls members of various gangs together for a meeting and presents them with the heads of their former leaders. He unites them to fight together. Kiera is also meeting with Jason, the other time traveler she met in "Endtimes" (the final episode of Season 1), who tells her that there are other time travelers present and that they are trying to kill him. Alec, desperate to remember something that his late father told him, takes flash, and sees his mother with his father, and when he turns around, Alec recognizes him as Jason.
14	4	"Second Skin"	William Waring	Shelley Eriksen	May 12, 2013
The discovery that Kiera's old partner went back to 1975 leaves Kiera with a shock when she learns of the life her partner has lived, while also forcing her to find her partner's old suit before it falls into the wrong hands after it is accidentally sold in her son's garage sale. The suit's presence alerts both factions of Liber8 who converge on its location hoping to obtain the suit, leading to a showdown between Sonya, Garza and Travis. Meanwhile, Kiera has to deal with the unwanted close attention of CSIS Agent Gardiner and his suspicions.
15	5	"Second Opinion"	Pat Williams	Jeff King	May 26, 2013
From dire to worse; Kiera suffers a nervous breakdown, which triggers a hidden psychiatric protocol in her CMR (which takes the form of a man in a grey Mao suit) that will erase her memories if she cannot cope with the psychological hardships she has been experiencing lately (a matter complicated by the fact that the protocol does not acknowledge Kiera's time-travel). Also, Vancouver, a city on the ropes from Liber8's actions, gets itself a new police chief that attempts to identify the mole in the department, a matter which proves problematic for both Kiera and Betty thanks to seriously incriminating e-mails on the VPD computer system. At the same time, Agent Gardiner attempts to finally get to the bottom of Kiera's true background by sitting in on her assessment.
16	6	"Second Truths"	Pat Williams	Jonathan Lloyd Walker	June 2, 2013
A serial killer is stalking Vancouver's streets, whose records were analyzed by Kiera in the future. Kiera needs to put all her future smarts in play to stop the killing while trying to keep Carlos at bay about those insights. As the case develops further, Carlos begins to suspect Kiera is lying about her involvement thanks to her seemingly expert knowledge and foresight of the case. In the meantime, Alec and Emily's relationship develops further. Finally, after exhausting all possible explanations, Carlos discovers the truth about Kiera's origins.
17	7	"Second Degree"	David J Frazee	Jeremy Smith	June 9, 2013
In 2077, he will be called Theseus, the spiritual father of Liber8. In the present, he's teenager Julian Randol, and his trial as an accessory in the City Plaza bombing begins. Kiera and Carlos discover a juror has been compromised and must race to protect his family from a Liber8 plot, not knowing that this will play directly into Liber8's hands. After seeing his mother lie in court to protect Julian, Alec is torn between telling the truth at his brother's trial or protecting his mother.
18	8	"Second Listen"	David J Frazee	Shelley Eriksen	June 16, 2013
Kiera's suspicions are confirmed; there were time jumpers before she and Liber8 came to the present. Now they're popping up dead and she must find out who's behind it. She uses Gardiner to establish links between the Freelancers, which ultimately costs Gardiner his life. Alec is kidnapped by Garza, acting on orders from Alec's future self.
19	9	"Seconds"	Michael Rohl	Raul Sanchez Inglis	July 7, 2013
Alec's mother is gunned down by a bullet meant for Julian, while Dillon's new Liber8 task force is tested when Kiera must decide how far she'll go to prevent Julian's future as "Theseus," the spiritual father of Liber8. Kiera insists that Theseus's future terrorist attacks will kill tens of thousands, and by 2077 his name is used to scare children at night. Carlos and Betty begin to question Dillon's technique when it comes to handling Liber8, and Kiera finds herself torn over what action to take when she is left alone with just Julian and her gun for company. In 2035, years before Kiera was born, the world has fallen into social chaos. Major corporations prop up remaining government structures to maintain control. The corporations institute a form of debtors' prisons, in which people who cannot afford to pay their debts to the corporations are officially stripped of their citizenships and implanted with mind-control chips, permanently making them brain-dead zombies who serve as worker-drones in corporate factories. Julian/Theseus's followers stage coordinated attacks on such factories all across North America, while Theseus himself leads an attack on the factory at New Pemberton. Before blowing up the facility, Julian orders his men to shut off the mind-control chips in the thousands of zombie factory workers, killing all of them. His rationale is that the corporations already functionally killed them, and their deaths will strike a blow against the corporations which will ultimately save millions.
20	10	"Second Wave"	Michael Rohl	Matt Venables	July 14, 2013
Kiera, thinking she was meeting with Section Six and Mr. Escher, is ambushed and taken hostage by fanatical followers of Julian, thirsting for payback after her torture of him. Alec activates the dormant military chip in Travis' brain, in the hope of recapturing him. But the hunter soon becomes the hunted. The freelancers try to capture Kiera, and end up with a different prize: Garza. Escher sends Emily on a mission to distract Alec by taking him to dinner away from the lab. Escher then pays the two a visit at a romantic dinner where Emily is confused by his presence. Escher offers Alec a partnership deal, what they don't know is Kellogg is watching the whole thing by the bar in secret.
21	11	"Second Guessed"	Simon Barry	Sam Egan	July 21, 2013
A ceaseless, increasingly devastating wave of cyber-attacks wreak havoc on Vancouver's infrastructure. Kiera and Carlos hunt for the perpetrator, but the evidence points to an ally in their midst - Alec. Travis and Sonya reconcile their differences after both of them are set up by Jim Martin, now the city's new Mayor. In the meantime, Lucas begins to go slightly crazy, after the effects of the time jump begin to make him see Kagame and Chen as still alive, giving him orders.
22	12	"Second Last"	Amanda Tapping	Shelley Eriksen & Jonathan Lloyd Walker	July 28, 2013
From worse to catastrophic; Travis gets his hands on Elena's CPS suit, and it's Kellog who gave it up. After Gardiner's body is finally discovered, CSIS accuses Kiera of the murder, and it's up to Carlos to protect her. The freelancers close in on the time travel device at Jason's loft. Emily reveals the truth about herself to Alec, right as Kiera catches up to her. As the freelancers close in, Emily and Kiera are trapped in a gunfight with catastrophic results for both Emily and Alec.
23	13	"Second Time"	Pat Williams	Simon Barry	August 4, 2013
When Escher reveals the truth about who he is to Alec, things change, and Kiera must rush to save Alec from himself, whilst facing increasing pressure from both CSIS and Dillon, still wanting answers about Gardiner's murder. Meanwhile, she finds herself facing trouble from the Freelancers, out to stop Alec from drastically changing history before it's too late.
