= Fast Times (Continuum) =

- Continuum episode
- Episode no.: Season 1 Episode 2
- Directed by: Jon Cassar
- Written by: Jeff King
- Original air date: June 3, 2012

Guest appearances
- John Reardon (Greg Cameron); Sean Michael Kyer (Sam Cameron); Michael Rogers (Roland Randol); Janet Kidder (Ann Sadler); Richard Harmon (Julian Randol); John Innes (Dr. Simon Fraser); Rocky Anderson (Sgt. Dan Barlow)

Episode chronology
| ← Previous "A Stitch in Time" | Next → "Wasting Time" |
- Continuum (season 1)

"Fast Times" is the second episode of the first season of the Canadian series Continuum, and the series' 2nd episode overall. The episode originally aired on June 3, 2012, on Showcase. The episode was written by Jeff King and directed by Jon Cassar.

== Plot ==
The episode opens with Kiera (Rachel Nichols) being scanned into and debriefed on her first day of work at CPS. The scene then jumps to the present where Travis Verta (Roger Cross) and Liber8 who are getting ready to travel back to their original intended destination of 2077, although Matthew Kellog (Stephen Lobo) decides to remain behind and use his knowledge of the future to try and convince people of the Government's corruption, however the other members of the group do not agree and bid farewell to their comrade.

Kiera arrives at the precinct, slightly nervous and also begins to reassure herself, although she has a tense meeting with Betty Robertson (Jennifer Spence). Carlos (Victor Webster) is called into Dillon's (Brian Markinson) office to meet Sgt. Dan Barlow (Rocky Anderson) of Portland P.D. who blows Kiera's cover stating that he does not know her and that she is not who she says she is. Dillon arrests her and she is questioned in the interrogation room by Carlos. After asking if she was under arrest, Carlos informs her that she needs to be processed, causing Alec (Erik Knudsen) to explain that it means that they will run her prints and discover that she is not who she is claiming to be.

Kiera informs Alec through a chatpad on the leg of her suit that she needs him to create a false ID that will fool Carlos and Dillon. Outside Dillon questions whether there is a conflict of interest regarding Kiera with Carlos, which Carlos denies. Dillon then tasks Carlos with having Kiera processed.

Elsewhere, the members of Liber8 pull up outside a parking garage and attack the security guard before Lucas Ingram (Omari Newton) pulls out a sphere shaped device that releases an electronic pulse, disabling much of the city's electrical power, including the elevator that Kiera and Carlos are currently in. After Alec informs her of where Liber8 are, she apologizes to Carlos and tases him before leaving the elevator to go after Liber8

Using a frequency generator built into her suit, she unlocks a series of cars before being told by Alec to get into one of the cars that required no key to start. While at first she has trouble starting and driving the vehicle, she eventually figures it out and heads for the scene of Liber8's crime. Meanwhile, Alec rushes into his house to grab breakfast and Dillon discovers Carlos handcuffed in the elevator. Soon after, Kiera arrives at the parking garage and asks the coroner what happened, to which he explains that they went in and then came out.

Nearby officers take an interest in Kiera and Alec explains to her that there is a warrant out for her arrest. Alec shows here a picture of Dr. Simon Fraser (John Innes) and Kiera connects his work with rockets to the possibility of Time Travel. This leads to her attempting to get to him before Liber8, however Travis has already reached him and kidnapped him. Meanwhile, back at the station, Dillon says that Carlos needs to find Kiera as he vouched for her. Betty then comes over and reveals that a hacker hacked into the Portland P.D. database. Carlos and Betty both agree to catch the hacker and Kiera.

Kiera arrives at Frasier's house to which his wife opens the door. Kiera convinces Mrs. Frasier to tell her where her husband had been taken, who reluctantly tells her that he was taken back to the university that he works at. Kiera calls up Carlos and says that she will text him with the location of the gang and also reveals that she has been working undercover in the gang. Elsewhere, Kellog is stood outside of his old house, when a girl walks out. He says that his mum used to live there, while the girl replies that they live there now.

Kiera arrives at the university while Lucas places the Time Travel Device into the fusion generator, while Frasier warns him to be careful. He is hit in the head by Jasmine Garza (Luvia Petersen) who states that Lucas is a scientist. Travis asks if Lucas is done with the Doctor while Kiera arrives at the facility. She places her phone on a container and tries to contact Alec who is in the process of returning to his barn, where he sees the phone through hacked CTV and learns that she did not text Carlos the location.

Kiera explains that she did not inform Carlos because she wants to go home, causing Alec to feel slightly hurt that his new friend is leaving. She sneaks up on Liber8 using her invisibility and takes Sonya (Lexa Doig) at gunpoint. She orders Travis to let Frasier go and that all she wants to do it go back with them. Liber8 agree to her terms and Lucas places the device into the generator. The resulting explosion fails to fulfill their objective and instead they are simply blasted away rather than being sent back to 2077.

Kiera stands and tells the terrorists that the ceasefire is over and begins trying to kill them again. Meanwhile, Carlos and his team enter the building although Liber8 see them and escape. Lucas later informs Travis that they are missing a piece of the Time Travel device. Carlos takes Kiera into custody and Frasier says that she shouldn't be arrested as she is a hero and saved him. Carlos pushes for more information on what happened inside but Fraiser refuses to divulge any more information.

Kiera gets processed while Betty attempts to find the hacker and Alec attempts to create Kiera a new identity. In a flashback we see Kiera tucking her son (Sean Michael Kyer) in and promising to tuck him in the next night afterwards her husband, Greg (John Reardon) tells her that she shouldn't make promises she may not be able to keep. In the present day Kiera begins to cry at the memory. Soon, however, Dillon comes in and refers to her and Agent Cameron, which is revealed to be the new identity created for her by Alec and it places her as being part of the FBI. After thanking Alec through Dillon, Dillon asks if she wants to join his task force directed at taking Liber8 down.

Carlos gives her the tour where she sees the final piece of the Time Travel Device is being logged into evidence.

== Cast ==
=== Main ===
- Rachel Nichols as Kiera Cameron
- Victor Webster as Carlos Fonnegra
- Erik Knudsen as Alec Sadler
- Stephen Lobo as Matthew Kellog
- Roger Cross as Travis Verta
- Lexa Doig as Sonya Valentine
- Tony Amendola as Edouard Kagame
- Omari Newton as Lucas Ingram
- Luvia Petersen as Jasmine Garza
- Jennifer Spence as Betty Robertson
- Terry Chen as Curtis Chen
- Brian Markinson as Jack Dillon

=== Guest ===
- John Reardon as Greg Cameron
- Sean Michael Kyer as Sam Cameron
- Michael Rogers as Roland Randol
- Janet Kidder as Ann Sadler
- Richard Harmon as Julian Randol
- John Innes as Dr. Simon Fraser
- Rocky Anderson as Sgt. Dan Barlow

== Reception ==
=== Ratings ===
Fast Times was viewed by 0.67 million viewers.

=== Reviews ===
Jayne Nelson of SFX gave a mixed review of the episode, stating that the "episode is a bit of a damp squib" as well as commenting that it was not very interesting on the action side barring the shoot off at the end of the episode. On the more positive side she explained that Kiera's relationships with both Alec and Carlos were building well and called the scenes of Kiera with her son in the future "sweet" as well as noting the fact that the episode does not over do Kiera's grief over being separated from her son. The final thing she commented on was the plot twist where Matthew Kellog decided to leave Liber8 and began using his knowledge of the future to begin creating himself a fortune.

Rob Kemp of Denofgeek UK gave a positive to mixed review of the episode stating that the showrunner had done a good job with making Liber8 appear as a real threat, noting specifically that "People die in Continuum" and "actions have real consequence", although he did condemn the fact that the future still has not been portrayed as terribly bad so Liber8's actions are stripped of all moral ambiguity and instead are portrayed more as selfish acts. He also noted that the writers appear to be concentrating on propelling the main story forwards and thus the small details are being sacrificed.

Jen Johnson of the US Denofgeek gives a positive review, mainly noting Alec and Kiera's relationship.

Chuck Francisco of Mania gave a mostly negative review of the episode, noting that of the two storylines in the episode, one is followed not enough while the other is followed tomorrow. He also states that the illusion in the moment that the main character may not make it out of a particular situation is not presented at all in within the show. He was grateful however that a member of Liber8 was not foaming at the mouth for murder, although he also expressed worry that the other members seeming love for murder could lead to them killing one of their ancestors by mistake.

Randy Dankievitch of Proceeds Media gave the episode a grading of C+, stating that the episode, at times, "gets lost up its own ass", and noting that some small details such as Carlos not wondering how Kiera tased him, appear to go untouched.

Tyler Olson of Crimson Tear gave a positive review of the episode, elaborating that the characters were taking on much larger roles and that the changes made worked well. However she did also note that the episode title "doesn't have any meaning for this episode at all". Overall she gave the episode a 4 out of a possible 5.

KSennia Visitor of We Love TV gave the episode an 8 out of a possible score of 10 and stated that she enjoyed the episode immensely.
