= A Stitch in Time (Continuum) =

- Continuum episode
- Episode no.: Season 1 Episode 1
- Directed by: Jon Cassar
- Written by: Simon Barry
- Original air date: May 27, 2012

Guest appearances
- John Reardon (Greg Cameron); Sean Michael Kyer (Sam Cameron); Michael Rogers (Roland Randol); Janet Kidder (Ann Sadler); Richard Harmon (Julian Randol); Caitlin Cromwell (Elena); David Nykl (Sergei); Zahf Paroo (Oscar)

Episode chronology
← Previous —	Next → "Fast Times"
- Continuum (season 1)

"A Stitch in Time" is the premiere episode of the first season of the Canadian series Continuum, and the series' 1st episode overall. The episode originally aired on May 27, 2012, on Showcase. The episode was written by Simon Barry and directed by Jon Cassar.

== Plot ==
The episode opens with Edouard Kagame (Tony Amendola) delivering a speech about how 20 years prior, the corporations of the world bailed out the failing Governments becoming the Corporate Congress, and that while at first it was seen as a saving grace, it is now seen as a dictatorship that removed all personal dignity and freedom. His speech is interrupted by City Protection Service (CPS) who arrest him for being the leader of the terrorist organisation Liber8.

He tells them that they are too late and Officer Kiera Cameron (Rachel Nichols) and the other officers of CPS watch as Liber8 destroy two skyscrapers.

Six months later, in Kiera's house, it is the eve of the execution of the leading members of Liber8 where it is revealed that they destroyed the skyscrapers in order to kill 20 corporate heads at the expense of tens of thousands of innocents. During the execution, Liber8 members are each given one piece of a Time Travel device. Kiera notices this and yells that they have something causing her and her partner Elena (Caitlin Cromwell) to run forwards as the terrorists throw each part of the device into the central power beam in front of them.

The device produces a small sphere of energy that teleports them backwards in time 65 years to 2012. Kiera wakes up in modern-day Vancouver and discovers that she in communication with Alec Sadler (Erik Knudsen) whom she met in 2077 as the head (William B. Davis) of the biggest corporation. She gives chase to Lucas Ingram (Omari Newton) who she manages to get arrested for threatening police officers with a weapon. Meanwhile, the remaining terrorists break into a weapons shop and reveal that Kagame did not make it through the time jump.

The next day she goes to the site at which she and the terrorists had landed and meets Detective Carlos Fonnegra (Victor Webster). She manages to fake her way into the police department to interrogate Lucas by pretending to be from the Portland police department. Afterwards she is called in to see Inspector Dillon (Brian Markinson) who is annoyed that the Portland police department had set up an operation in his territory without telling him.

He almost blows Kiera's cover by phoning Portland but is interrupted by the report that Liber8 has attacked a police patrol and taken all of the weapons as well as setting off multiple bank alarms across the city. Kiera quickly figures out that the bank they are robbing is the final alarm to be triggered.

After escaping the police ambush, Liber8 escapes into an abandoned building followed shortly by Kiera. After a brief firefight, Stefan Jaworski (Mike Dopud) is taken down by an electrical charge sent through some wire from Kiera's suit. Kiera is saved from a sneak attack from Stefan by Carlos while Matthew Kellog (Stephen Lobo) and Curtis Chen (Terry Chen) escape.

Kiera then asks Carlos how many were in the bank and he replies just the three that they had just fought. Kiera then suddenly realises that the remaining members of Liber8 are attacking the police building to rescue Lucas from holding. The two of them return to find many people either wounded or being taken out on stretchers.

== Cast ==
=== Main ===
- Rachel Nichols as Kiera Cameron
- Victor Webster as Carlos Fonnegra
- Erik Knudsen as Alec Sadler
- Stephen Lobo as Matthew Kellog
- Roger Cross as Travis Verta
- Lexa Doig as Sonya Valentine
- Tony Amendola as Edouard Kagame
- Omari Newton as Lucas Ingram
- Luvia Petersen as Jasmine Garza
- Jennifer Spence as Betty Robertson
- Mike Dopud as Stefan Jaworski
- William B. Davis as Elder Alec Sadler
- Terry Chen as Curtis Chen
- Brian Markinson as Jack Dillon

=== Guest ===
- John Reardon as Greg Cameron
- Sean Michael Kyer as Sam Cameron
- Michael Rogers as Roland Randol
- Janet Kidder as Ann Sadler
- Richard Harmon as Julian Randol
- Caitlin Cromwell as Elena
- David Nykl as Sergei
- Zahf Paroo as Oscar

== Reception ==
=== Ratings ===
A Stitch in Time was viewed by 0.9 million viewers.

=== Reviews ===
Rob Kemp of Den of Geek gave a good overall review stating that the acting was good and that "Nichols has the charisma to be a show carrier" but also noted that the supporting cast were bland but hoped for further development. He also noted that while the focus on the futuristic technology, although he also noted that "the climatic shoot-out does hint that the suit will become a deus ex machina in the writers' arsenal."

Randy Dankievitch of Processed Media gave a mainly negative review, stating that while he has some hopes for the show, he was disappointed at the fact Kiera faked her way into the police department "Through some really inexplicably lame plot convolution". She notes that Alec's character in central to all major plot points but states that Kiera's determination to return to her family is going to have to change to keep her personal story interesting. He also commented that the shootouts were unneeded and drawn out. Overall he gave the episode a B−.

Matt Fowler of IGN gave a mostly positive review stating that the question of Time Travel was dealt with but not dealt with by two different possibilities being stated with one possibility being leaned on more than the other. He did however explain that Kiera corporation with the VPD relied on them ditching "all sorts of usual cop protocol in order to just follow this freaky, pretty newcomer on faith."

Jayne Nelson of SFX gave a positive review of the episode, commenting on the likeness of Erik Knudsen and William B Davis who play the young and old Alec respectively. She also noted that Director Jon Casser had done a brilliant job with the episode, in particular a scene where Liber8 walk down an alley in Slow Motion.
