= List of Continuum episodes =

Continuum is a Canadian science fiction television series created by Simon Barry. It was first shown on the Showcase channel on May 27, 2012. It premiered in the U.S on the Syfy channel on January 14, 2013. The series revolves around Kiera Cameron (Rachel Nichols), a CPS "protector" (police officer) from the year 2077 who was transported back to 2012 with a group of terrorists called Liber8 who were scheduled for execution, before their time jump. Kiera must stop Liber8 from changing the past, so she disguises herself as a special agent, and teams up with Carlos Fonnegra (Victor Webster) and Alec Sadler (Erik Knudsen) to stop them. Along the way, she often crosses paths with Matthew Kellog (Stephen Lobo), a former member of Liber8 who has broken off with an agenda of his own.

Showcase announced on December 8, 2014 that Continuum had been renewed for a fourth and final season of six episodes, which began airing September 4, 2015, and concluded on October 9, 2015. During the course of the series, 42 episodes of Continuum aired over four seasons.

== Series overview ==
Season	Episodes	Originally released	
Season	Episodes	First released	Last released
1	10	May 27, 2012	August 5, 2012
2	13	April 21, 2013	August 4, 2013
3	13	March 16, 2014	June 22, 2014
4	6	September 4, 2015	October 9, 2015

== Episodes ==
=== Season 1 (2012) ===
No. overall	No. in season	Title	Directed by	Written by	Original release date	Can. viewers (millions)
1	1	"A Stitch in Time"	Jon Cassar	Simon Barry	May 27, 2012	0.900
2	2	"Fast Times"	Jon Cassar	Jeff King	June 3, 2012	0.670
3	3	"Wasting Time"	David Frazee	Simon Barry	June 10, 2012	0.531
4	4	"A Matter of Time"	Michael Rohl	Sam Egan	June 17, 2012	0.389
5	5	"A Test of Time"	Patrick Williams	Jeff King	June 24, 2012	0.473
6	6	"Time's Up"	Rachel Talalay	Jeremy Smith & Jonathan Lloyd Walker	July 8, 2012	0.404
7	7	"The Politics of Time"	Patrick Williams	Sara B. Cooper	July 15, 2012	0.427
8	8	"Playtime"	Paul Shapiro	Andrea Stevens	July 22, 2012	N/A
9	9	"Family Time"	William Waring	Floyd Kane	July 29, 2012	N/A
10	10	"Endtime"	Patrick Williams	Simon Barry	August 5, 2012	N/A

=== Season 2 (2013) ===
No. overall	No. in season	Title	Directed by	Written by	Original release date
11	1	"Second Chances"	Pat Williams	Simon Barry	April 21, 2013
12	2	"Split Second"	Pat Williams	Simon Barry	April 28, 2013
13	3	"Second Thoughts"	William Waring	Sam Egan	May 5, 2013
14	4	"Second Skin"	William Waring	Shelley Eriksen	May 12, 2013
15	5	"Second Opinion"	Pat Williams	Jeff King	May 26, 2013
16	6	"Second Truths"	Pat Williams	Jonathan Lloyd Walker	June 2, 2013
17	7	"Second Degree"	David J Frazee	Jeremy Smith	June 9, 2013
18	8	"Second Listen"	David J Frazee	Shelley Eriksen	June 16, 2013
19	9	"Seconds"	Michael Rohl	Raul Sanchez Inglis	July 7, 2013
20	10	"Second Wave"	Michael Rohl	Matt Venables	July 14, 2013
21	11	"Second Guessed"	Simon Barry	Sam Egan	July 21, 2013
22	12	"Second Last"	Amanda Tapping	Shelley Eriksen & Jonathan Lloyd Walker	July 28, 2013
23	13	"Second Time"	Pat Williams	Simon Barry	August 4, 2013

=== Season 3 (2014) ===
No. overall	No. in season	Title	Directed by	Written by	Original release date
24	1	"Minute by Minute"	Pat Williams	Simon Barry	March 16, 2014
25	2	"Minute Man"	Pat Williams	Simon Barry	March 23, 2014
26	3	"Minute to Win It"	Pat Williams	Shelley Eriksen	March 30, 2014
27	4	"A Minute Changes Everything"	William Waring	Denis McGrath	April 6, 2014
28	5	"30 Minutes to Air"	William Waring	Jonathan Lloyd Walker	April 13, 2014
29	6	"Wasted Minute"	Amanda Tapping	Jeremy Smith & Matt Venables	April 27, 2014
30	7	"Waning Minutes"	Amanda Tapping	Sam Egan	May 4, 2014
31	8	"So Do Our Minutes Hasten"	Pat Williams	Jeff King	May 11, 2014
32	9	"Minute of Silence"	Pat Williams	Simon Barry	May 25, 2014
33	10	"Revolutions Per Minute"	David Frazee	Denis McGrath	June 1, 2014
34	11	"3 Minutes to Midnight"	David Frazee	Jonathan Lloyd Walker	June 8, 2014
35	12	"The Dying Minutes"	Simon Barry	Shelley Eriksen	June 15, 2014
36	13	"Last Minute"	William Waring	Simon Barry	June 22, 2014

=== Season 4 (2015) ===
No. overall	No. in season	Title	Directed by	Written by	Original release date
37	1	"Lost Hours"	Patrick Williams	Simon Barry	September 4, 2015
38	2	"Rush Hour"	Patrick Williams	Shelley Eriksen	September 11, 2015
39	3	"Power Hour"	David Frazee	Jeremy Smith & Todd Ireland	September 18, 2015
40	4	"Zero Hour"	David Frazee	Jonathan Lloyd Walker	September 25, 2015
41	5	"The Desperate Hours"	Patrick Williams	Shelley Eriksen	October 2, 2015
42	6	"Final Hour"	Patrick Williams	Simon Barry	October 9, 2015
