= Fast Times (disambiguation) =

Fast Times may refer to:

== Entertainment ==
=== Film and television ===
- Fast Times at Ridgemont High, a 1982 coming-of-age comedy drama film
- Fast Times, a 1986 American television series
- "Fast Times at Buddy Cianci Jr. High", a 2005 episode of Family Guy
- "Fast Times", the second episode of the first season of Continuum, 2012

=== Music ===
- "Fast Times", a 2008 song by One Buck Short
- Fast Times at Barrington High, a 2008 album by American rock band The Academy Is...
- "Fast Times at Clairemont High", a 2010 song by Pierce the Veil from Selfish Machines
- "Fast Times", a 2022 song by Sabrina Carpenter

== Literature ==
- Fast Times at Fairmont High, a novella by Vernor Vinge
