= Flash Gordon (2007 TV series) =

2007–2008 American-Canadian science fiction television series

- Genre: Science fiction; Adventure; Action; Fantasy; Comedy drama; Superhero
- Based on: Flash Gordon by Alex Raymond
- Developed by: Peter Hume
- Starring: Eric Johnson; Gina Holden; Karen Cliche; Jody Racicot; John Ralston; Anna van Hooft; Jonathan Lloyd Walker; Steve Bacic
- Music by: Michael Picton
- Countries of origin: United States; Canada
- No. of seasons: 1
- No. of episodes: 21

Production
- Executive producers: Robert Halmi Jr. Robert Halmi Sr. Peter Hume
- Running time: 42 minutes
- Production companies: Flash Films; Reunion Pictures; King Features Entertainment

Original release
- Network: Sci-Fi
- Release: August 10, 2007 – February 8, 2008

Flash Gordon is a science fiction television series that debuted on Sci-Fi in the United States on August 10, 2007 and continued airing new episodes through February 8, 2008. It has also appeared on the British/Ireland variant of Sci-Fi and Space in Canada. The series was developed by Peter Hume, who served as executive producer/showrunner and wrote the first and last episodes, among others.

== Plot ==
The series was loosely based on the comic strip of the same name and incorporated elements from several previous adaptations, following the adventures of Steven "Flash" Gordon, a twenty-five-year-old who lives with his mother and whose scientist father was lost in a mysterious accident when Flash was 13 years old. Flash's ex-girlfriend, Dale Arden, is a television news reporter and engaged to police detective, Joe Wylee. They meet Professor Gordon's eccentric former assistant, Hans Zarkov, when rifts in space appear, allowing travel between Earth and the planet Mongo.

Mongo is ruled by the ruthless dictator Ming, who controls "Source Water", the only source of safe drinking water on Mongo. Unlike the previous adaptations, he is only called "the Merciless" in closed circles and is publicly called "Benevolent Father". He also exhibits the traits of modern, media-savvy dictators, rather than the more simplistic, stereotypically evil characterization of earlier incarnations. Also unlike previous depictions, Ming resembles a blond Caucasian human rather than a bald East Asian man. Ming's daughter, Princess Aura, is disturbed by her father's brutality. The series adds a new non-Terran character, Baylin, a bounty hunter from Mongo. She finds herself trapped on Earth and becomes a comrade of Flash, Dale, and Zarkov and their guide to Mongo and its inhabitants.

The peoples of Mongo live in "cantons", tribal groups that echo the animal-human hybrids of the original comic strip. The cantons include the Verdan, based on Prince Barin's forest-dwelling people from the strip, the Turin, based on the strip's Lion Men, the Dactyls, the series' version of the strip's Hawkmen, the Omadrians, women, who create powerful medicines, the Frigians, who live in the frozen wastelands, the Tritons, who live beneath the ocean, and the Zurn, painted blue "Magic Men" led, by queen Azura. There is also another group known as the Deviates, mutants whose ancestors drank "Grey Water", toxic water to survive. The Deviates are led, by Terek, their unofficial king, later revealed to be Aura's brother and are distrusted, by almost everyone.

== Cast ==
=== Main ===
- Eric Johnson as Steven "Flash" Gordon
- Gina Holden as Dale Arden
- Karen Cliche as Baylin
- Jody Racicot as Dr. Hans Zarkov
- John Ralston as Ming
- Jonathan Lloyd Walker as Rankol

=== Recurring ===
- Anna Van Hooft as Princess Aura
- Panou as Nick Gilmore
- Giles Panton as Joe Wylee
- Jill Teed as Norah Gordon
- Carmen Moore as Joely Lavant
- Carrie Genzel as Vestra
- Craig Stanghetta as Terek
- Steve Bacic as Prince Barin
- Ty Olsson as Prince Vultan
- Jody Thompson as Azura

== Episodes ==
No.	Title	Directed by	Written by	Original release date
1	"Pilot"	Rick Rosenthal	Peter Hume	August 10, 2007
Flash Gordon thought that his father died in a fire 13 years ago. Actually, Professor Gordon disappeared through a "rift", traveling to the planet Mongo... and now something has come back through the rift, looking for a mysterious artifact that Gordon left behind. Flash is forced to team up with his ex-girlfriend, Dale Arden, who travels with him to Mongo to meet Ming, the planet's brutal dictator. When they arrive, Ming imprisons Flash and sends Dale to his harem to be prepared for his pleasure. In the end, Flash and Dale escape back to Earth.
2	"Pride"	Paul Shapiro	Derick Martini and Steven Martini	August 17, 2007
Ming's bounty hunter, Baylin, is trapped on Earth and living in Flash's house. To bring Baylin back, Ming sends another hunter, who has a personal connection to her.
3	"Infestation"	Paul Shapiro	Melody Fox	August 24, 2007
A dangerous insect travels through an errant rift and bites Flash's friend, Nick. Dale is left behind to tend to Nick, while Flash and Baylin travel to Mongo in search of a cure.
4	"Assassin"	Neil Fearnley	James Thorpe	September 7, 2007
Flash is astonished to see his father come through the rift, but his joy turns to horror when Professor Gordon starts murdering his old colleagues.
5	"Ascension"	T.J. Scott	Scott Murphy	September 14, 2007
Vultan, leader of the Dactyls, extorts Rankol into opening a portal to Earth, so he can find the son he lost via a rift a decade ago.
6	"Life Source"	T.J. Scott	Melody Fox	September 21, 2007
Athletes begin disappearing and someone from Mongo seems to be behind it.
7	"Alliances (Part 1)"	Grant Harvey	Gillian Horvath	September 28, 2007
Flash, Baylin and Zarkov travel to Mongo, searching for information about Flash's father. To be continued.
8	"Revelations (Part 2)"	Mick MacKay	James Thorpe	October 5, 2007
Prince Barin of the Verdan agrees to marry Ming's daughter Aura. Ming is disturbed by a prophecy predicting his overthrow. Sam J. Jones who played Krebb in this episode also starred as Flash Gordon in the 1980 Flash Gordon movie.
9	"Till Death"	Morgan Beggs	Lisa Klink	October 12, 2007
Aura travels to Earth to drug Flash with a love potion, so that she may get out of the arranged bonding with Barin. Aura's plan works and she make Flash to fall in love with her.
10	"Conspiracy Theory"	Rick Stevenson	Sheryl J. Anderson	October 19, 2007
Rankol has Zarkov kidnapped and brought to Mongo. A government agent named Montgomery questions Flash and Dale about the rifts.
11	"Random Access"	Patrick Williams	David Tynan	October 26, 2007
The barrier between dimensions breaks down causing rifts to randomly develop. Flash and Joe end up on Mongo working in a mine.
12	"Secrets and Lies"	Mick MacKay	Peter Hume	November 2, 2007
Joe tries to convince his Captain that Mongo is real. Flash and Zarkov travel through a rift to prevent its detection. Ming secretly tries to start a war between two cantons to hide the fact that there is not enough source water to meet all promised amounts.
13	"Sorrow"	Patrick Williams	Melody Fox	November 9, 2007
Honor Day is celebrated on Mongo, in remembrance of lives lost during an environmental cataclysm known as "The Sorrow". During the festivities, Ming orchestrates a brutal attack on the Verdan.
14	"Stand and Deliver"	Mick MacKay	Gillian Horvath	November 16, 2007
Flash and the gang learn that the Verdan have become captured and are being sold as slaves. After Dale is captured as well, they learn that Ming is growing paranoid about a prophecy that he believes predicts that Barin will overthrow him.
15	"Possession"	Patrick Williams	Andrea Stevens	November 30, 2007
Joe sets off for Mongo with a rift blaster stolen from Zarkov's lab to secure photographic proof that the alien world exists. Flash and the gang pursue and encounter a witch who steals Dale's soul. Elyse Levesque, Christina Jastrzembska.
16	"Thicker Than Water"	Matt Hastings	James Thorpe	January 4, 2008
Flash and Aura are kidnapped by a Deviate after he returns to Mongo with Baylin and Zarkov in search of the rift blaster that Joe lost. They need to find it before Rankol does.
17	"Ebb and Flow"	Patrick Williams	Sheryl J. Anderson	January 11, 2008
Rankol steals a lake from Earth and stores it in a reservoir on Mongo. This forces Flash, Baylin, and Zarkov to return to Mongo. They are forced to make a tough decision, resulting in Joe's death.
18	"Blame"	Rachel Talalay	Melody Fox	January 18, 2008
Water that is supplied to the Cantons is found to be contaminated. This forces Flash and Aura to go on a journey to find an antidote to prevent a massive loss of life.
19	"Cold Day in Hell"	Pat Williams	Gillian Horvath	January 25, 2008
Flash ventures to Frigia to free the cold region's queen and face the final test of the prophecy.
20	"Revolution (Part 1)"	Paul Shapiro	James Thorpe	February 1, 2008
Ming sends his soldiers to raid the ice in Frigia, leaving the city unprotected. Flash and Terek rally the cantons in preparation for their attack on Ming's palace, with Rankol now on their side. Flash frees his father from Rankol's mind prison. Back on Earth, Dale and Mrs. Gordon are chased by Government agents and manage to flee to Mongo.
21	"Revolution (Part 2)"	Paul Shapiro	Peter Hume	February 8, 2008
Terek's attack against Ming has begun and Ming enlists the help of Azura to repel Terek's forces. Dr. Gordon is reunited with his wife after 13 years. Ming is captured by Flash and Aura and brought before Terek. Placed in the death chamber, Ming escapes by utilizing the magic power of Azura's medallion. Flash's parents return to Earth but the others are left trapped on Mongo.

== Broadcast ==
Flash Gordon was canceled in April 2008. Re-runs of the show began airing weekly on ION Television on August 1, 2008.

== Reception ==
The show was not well received. Metacritic gave the show an average score of 35/100 based on reviews from 13 critics. UK science fiction magazine SFX described episode 3 as "possibly the worst episode of anything, ever", and as part of their 200th issue features, they named the series as the worst they had ever reviewed. The New York Post gave the show 0 stars describing it as "a disgrace to the name of the enduring comic-strip-character-turned-movie-and-TV space hero". Another UK science fiction magazine, TV Zone, in a review for episode 13, stated "the series continues to improve, and you start to see the meaning in the producers' madness - they must have hoped they could lull passing viewers into watching Sci-Fi with pedestrian, mainstream plots, before building up a world of Dune-like complexity...which might even have worked if the early episodes hadn't been so dire that no-one but reviewers are still watching". When the show premiered in the UK, the magazine recommended it to readers, noting "you may well be wondering, considering the vitriol of our early reviews of the series, why we're picking out Flash Gordon as something to watch out for. Well, the point is that while the early episodes are dire, this is one series that does eventually and we mean eventually, reward patience and endurance".

== Home media ==
In August 2007, Best Buy offered an exclusive DVD that included "The Premiere Episode", selected deleted scenes (with incomplete effects) and a gallery of series concept art. This release includes the truncated 65-minute version of the pilot, exactly as it aired on Sci-Fi four days prior. Subsequent DVD releases include the full 87-minute version of the pilot, split into two parts.

Phase 4 Films released the complete series on DVD in Region 1 (Canada only) in July 2009. The 5-disc set features all 22 episodes of the series.

Mill Creek Entertainment has released the complete series on DVD in the USA in April 2013.

== In other media ==
=== CD releases ===
In February 2014, Perseverance Records released a CD containing selected cues by composer Michael Picton. A second album was released in May, with the final volume scheduled for later in the year.
