= Karin Konoval =

Canadian-American actress (born 1961)

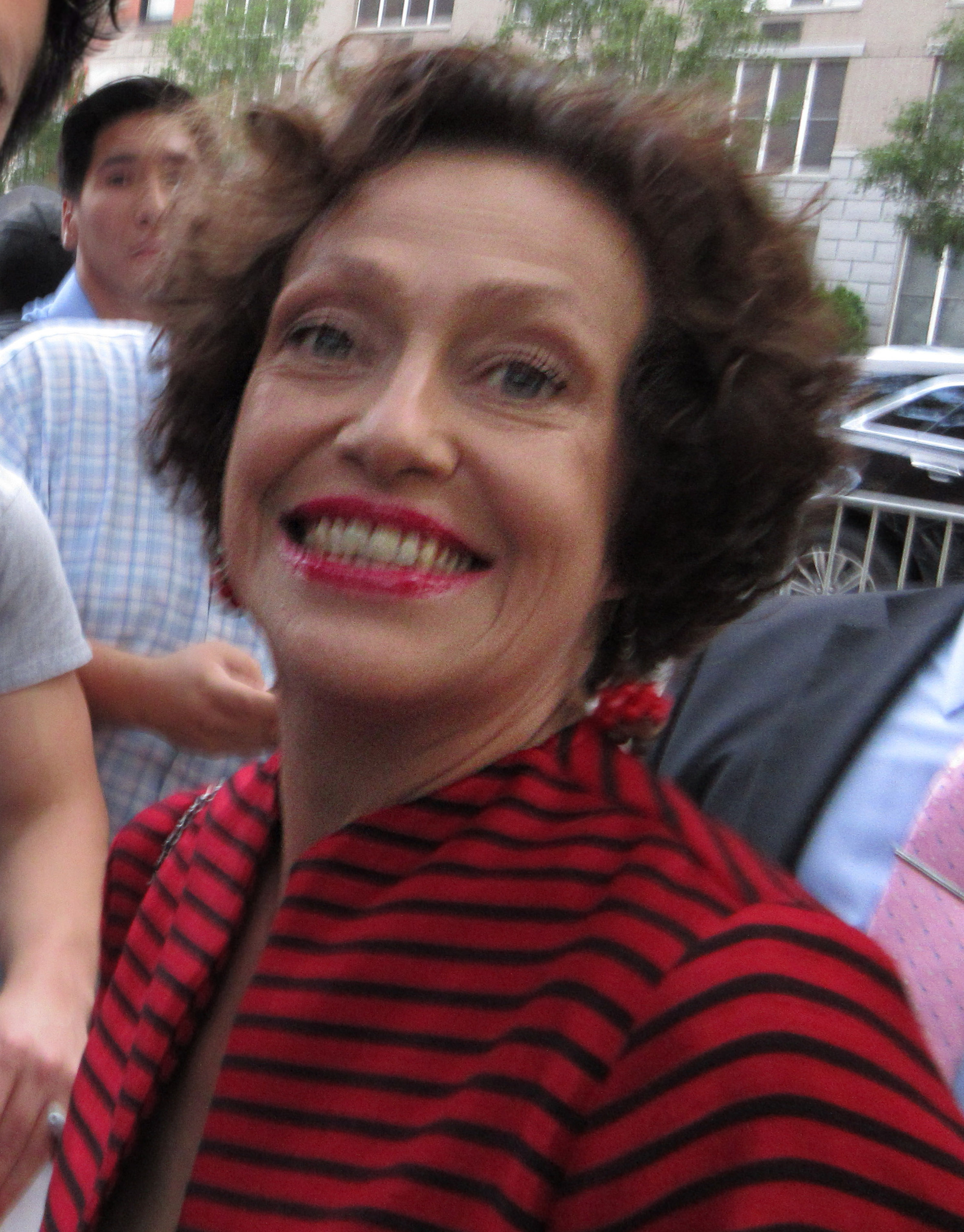
- Konoval in 2017
- Born: June 4, 1961 (age 65); Baltimore, Maryland, U.S.
- Citizenship: United States; Canada
- Occupation: Actress
- Years active: 1986–present

Karin Konoval (/ˈkɒnəvəl/ KON-ə-vəl; born June 4, 1961) is a Canadian-American actress who has appeared in theatre, numerous TV series and supporting lead roles in many feature films. Her screen credits include Maurice the Orangutan in Rise of the Planet of the Apes, Dawn of the Planet of the Apes, and War for the Planet of the Apes, recurring roles in Snowpiercer and The Good Doctor, and the lead role of Mary Leonard in Cable Beach.

== Early life ==
Konoval was born in Baltimore, Maryland, and raised in Canada in Edmonton, Alberta. She trained as a dancer until she was 16. She graduated from the University of Alberta with a Bachelor of Arts, studying English and Theatre History. She relocated to Vancouver to attend theatre school in 1981 for two years.

== Other projects ==
Besides acting she also paints, writes short stories and she designed choreography and sound for theatre productions.

=== Author ===
Her writing has appeared in anthologies and magazines, including Exact Fare Only II (Anvil Press), Other Voices (Alberta literary anthology), Playboard magazine, The Courier and Live To Imagine (writing contest anthology). It has been broadcast on CBC radio. She wrote and illustrated her first book "Jeffrey Takes a Walk in December" in 2015.

== Filmography ==
=== Film ===
Year	Title	Role	Note
1986	Firefighter	Fire Department Secretary	
1993	For the Love of My Child: The Anissa Ayala Story	Dance Instructor	
1993	Double, Double, Toil and Trouble	Witch #2	
1994	Spoils of War	Lady in Street	
1995	When the Vows Break	Clerk Sybill	
1995	Ebbie	Ebbie's mother	
1996	Maternal Instincts	Hospital Receptionist	
1997	Alibi	Judge Rawlings	
1998	Circle of Deceit	Therapist	
1998	The Alley	Woman	Short
1999	In a Class of His Own	Mrs. Escobar	
2000	Deadlocked	Mrs. Novalo	
2000	My 5 Wives	Janet	
2001	The Whole Shebang	Gum Smackin Woman	Uncredited
2001	Snow White: The Fairest of Them All	Crone	
2001	The Miracle of the Cards	Editor	
2001	Off Season	Mona Sanchez	
2001	The Heart Department	Receptionist	
2001	Silicon Follies	Interviewer	
2002	The Stickup	Dr. Alvarez	
2002	We'll Meet Again	Marta Jones	
2004	Scooby-Doo 2: Monsters Unleashed	Aggie Wilkins	
2004	The Life	Brenda Reilly	
2004	Cable Beach	Mary Leonard	
2005	Alone In The Dark	Sister Clara	
2005	Saving Milly	Annie Villareal	Uncredited
2005	14 Hours	Dr. Estrada	
2006	A Little Thing Called Murder	Judge	
2006	The Stranger Game	Susan Copeland	
2006	Black Christmas	Constance Lenz	
2006	What Have You Done?: The Remaking of 'Black Christmas'	Billy's Mother / Herself	Documentary
2006	Eulogy	Rose	Short
2007	Seventeen and Missing	Helen Vetter	
2007	In the Land of Women	Dr. Ida Rosen	
2007	Unthinkable	Dr. Miriam Post	
2008	The Quality of Life	Constable Lacey	
2008	Mail Order Bride	Mrs. Vaughn	
2008	The Boy Next Door	Lillian	
2008	Christmas Town	Roxie	
2009	American Pie Presents: The Book of Love	Store Manager	
2009	2012	Sally (President's Secretary)	
2010	Diary of a Wimpy Kid	Mrs. Irvine	
2010	Elopement	Gillian Drummond	
2011	Rise of the Planet of the Apes	Maurice / Court Clerk	
2012	The Eleventh Victim	Art Teacher	
2012	It's Christmas, Carol!	Older Carol	
2012	The Movie Out Here	Edith	
2012	Anything But Christmas	Emilia	
2014	Dawn of the Planet of the Apes	Maurice	
2014	Step Up: All In	Ana	
2014	The Christmas Secret	Mrs. Meredith	
2015	R.L. Stine's Monsterville: Cabinet of Souls	Ms. Sarkosian	
2015	Signed, Sealed, Delivered: The Impossible Dream	Chairwoman	
2016	Cradle of Lies	Cynthia	
2017	War for the Planet of the Apes	Maurice	
2017	Woody Woodpecker	Barbara Krum	
2017	Maternal Instinct	Lois	
2017	FTL	Sarah Johns	Short
2018	Solve for X: Constructing Season 11	Herself	Documentary
2019	Republic of Sarah	Judge Paula Judge	
2020	Close Up	Martine	
2024	Kingdom of the Planet of the Apes	Maurice	Cameo

=== Television ===
Year	Title	Role	Note
1987–1991	21 Jump Street	Waitress / Nurse	3 episodes
1989	Wiseguy	Gloria	Episode: "Where's the Money?"
1990	Danger Bay	Audrey Pike	Episode: "Hijacked"
1991	Max Glick	Stella Porretta	4 episodes
1993	The Commish	Hamburger Stand Manager / Christine Harrison	2 episodes
1993–1994	Exosquad	Additional Voices	12 episodes
1995–2018	The X Files	Little Judy Poundstone / Little Chucky Poundstone / Mrs. Peacock / Madame Zelma	3 episodes
1996	Sliders	Fortune Teller	Episode: "Into the Mystic"
1996	Two	Prosecutor	Episode: "A.D."
1996	Adventures in Parenting	Riley and Megan's mother / Mother	2 episodes
1996–1999	The Sentinel	Nancy	2 episodes
1996–1999	Poltergeist: The Legacy	Gypsy Woman / Woman #1	2 episodes
1997–1998	Millennium	Dr. Angela Horvath / Woman	3 episodes
1998	Cold Squad	Iris Turin	2 episodes
1998	The Outer Limits	Sarah	Episode: "Lithia"
1998	Dead Man's Gun	Woman	Episode: "The Trapper"
1998–2003	Da Vinci's Inquest	Linda Saltwyn / Madeline / Julie Parks	4 episodes
1999	Aftershock: Earthquake in New York	FEMA Official	2 episodes
1999	Beggars and Choosers	Wife	1 episode
1999	You, Me and the Kids		2 episodes
2000	Strange World	Dr. Karen Michaels	1 episode
2002	Beyond Belief: Fact or Fiction	Margaret Walker	1 episode
2002	Just Cause	Judge Franklin	1 episode
2002–2003	John Doe	Beehive	3 episodes
2003	Stargate SG-1	Dr. Sandy Van Densen	1 episode
2003	Romeo!	Mrs. Landers	1 episode
2003–2004	Dead Zone	Sylvia Tesich	2 episodes
2004	Century City	Judge Wallenstein	1 episode
2004	The 4400	Dr. Emily Sanford	1 episode
2004–2005	Tru Calling	Detective / Head Nurse	2 episodes
2005	Reunion	Doctor Polson	1 episode
2006	Da Vinci's City Hall	Martha Mellors	1 episode
2006	Godiva's	Dr. Balfour	2 episodes
2006	The Evidence	Jan McGee	1 episode
2006	Blade: The Series	Mina	1 episode
2006	Saved	Dr. Fish / ER Doctor	2 episodes
2006	Men in Trees	Miss Frankel	1 episode
2007	The L Word	Dee Dee	1 episode
2007	Tin Man	Wicked Witch	3 episodes
2007	The Virgin of Akron, Ohio	Zelda	1 episode
2008	Psych	Pamela	1 episode
2008	Robson Arms	Marg	1 episode
2008	Stargate: Atlantis	Second in Command	1 episode
2009	The Good Wife	Mrs. Duretsky	1 episode
2009–2013	Supernatural	Ruth / Mrs. Curry	2 episodes
2010	Hiccups	Marsha	1 episode
2010	Tower Prep	Nurse	3 episodes
2011	Fringe	Dr. Christine Albright	1 episode
2011–2012	R.L. Stine's The Haunting Hour	Old Gresilda / Mrs. Hollinger / Mrs. Biazevich	4 episodes
2012	Level Up	Rhea	1 episode
2013	Continuum	Elena	1 episode
2014	Intruders	Bobbi Zimmerman	3 episodes
2014	Garage Sale Mysteries	Louise	1 episode
2015	Backstrom	Louise Hanley	1 episode
2015	Motive	Lorraine	1 episode
2015	Arrow	Dr. Vaca	1 episode
2015; 2023	When Calls the Heart	Agatha	2 episodes
2015	Minority Report	Lynn Dravecky	1 episode
2015	iZombie	Dr. Erving	1 episode
2016	Bates Motel	Kara	Episode: "A Danger to Himself and Others"
2016	Travelers	Mrs. Bloom	1 episode
2016	Lucifer	Judge Vicky Estrada	1 episode
2017	The Magicians	Kitchen Witch	1 episode
2017	The Exorcist	Sister Dolores	3 episodes
2017	Dirk Gently's Holistic Detective Agency	Frija Dengdamor	5 episodes
2018	Beyond	Dr. Coleman	2 episodes
2018	Take Two	Melanie Ray	1 episode
2018–2020	The Good Doctor	Deena Petringa	13 episodes
2019	Supergirl	Senator Granberry	1 episode
2019	Charmed	Elder Robinson	1 episode
2019	The Twilight Zone	Aidia	1 episode
2020–2022	The Baby-Sitters Club	Esme Porter / Morbidda Destiny	
2020–2024	Snowpiercer	Dr. Pelton	Recurring, 30 episodes
2021	Big Sky	Penelope Denesuk	3 episodes
2023	Schmigadoon!	Female Barfly	6 episodes
