= Test of Time =

Test of Time may refer to:

- Civilization II: Test of Time, a 1999 video game

== Literature ==
- Test of Time, a 1987 novel by Jayne Ann Krentz
- A Test of Time: The Bible - from Myth to History, a 1995 non-fiction book by David Rohl
- Tests of Time, a 2002 non-fiction book by William H. Gass
- The Test of Time: The Sixth Journey Through Time, a 2013 chapter book by Elisabetta Dami; the sixth installment in The Journey Through Time sequence, part of the Geronimo Stilton series

== Television ==
- "A Test of Time", Continuum season 1, episode 5 (2012)
- "A Test of Time", Solved season 2, episode 5 (2009)
- "Test of Time", Superboy season 3, episode 9 (1990)
- "Test of Time", The Grim Adventures of Billy & Mandy season 2, episode 11a (2004)
- "The Test of Time", The New Adventures of He-Man episode 37 (1991)

== Other uses ==
- Lindy effect
