= Merlin's Apprentice =

2006 miniseries directed by David Wu

- Written by: Roger Soffer; Christian Ford
- Directed by: David Wu
- Starring: Sam Neill; Miranda Richardson; John Reardon; Christopher Jacot; Meghan Ory; Tegan Moss
- Theme music composer: Lawrence Shragge
- Countries of origin: United States; Canada
- Original language: English

Production
- Producers: Robert Halmi, Jr. Robert Halmi, Sr. Matthew O'Connor; Michael O'Connor; Roger Soffer
- Cinematography: John Spooner
- Editor: David Wu
- Running time: 176 minutes

Original release
- Network: Hallmark Channel
- Release: April 14 – April 17, 2006

Related
- Merlin

Merlin's Apprentice is a 2006 miniseries and a sequel to Merlin, with Sam Neill and Miranda Richardson reprising their roles as Merlin and the Lady of the Lake. Loosely adapted from Arthurian legend, the plot takes place after the death of King Arthur, with some contradictions to the original story.

== Plot ==
=== Part I ===
Satisfied at Camelot's conditions, Merlin (Sam Neill) decides to go on vacation in order to rejuvenate. This vacation nap is supposed to last a few months, but when Merlin awakes, he finds he has slept for fifty years. Upon his return to Camelot, he discovers a downtrodden place. Almost all of those he knew have died; Lord Weston (Garwin Sanford) runs the kingdom and the Holy Grail has departed from the castle, but Merlin's protective enchantments have held invaders in check.

A young thief named Jack (John Reardon) and his tagalong pig Sir Snout stowaway in a cart entering Camelot, angering its driver Squire Brian. Jack is no ordinary vagrant, as he possesses some rudimentary magical skills. Jack enters the chamber of Yvonne (Tegan Moss), granddaughter of Sir Gawain and steals a pendant. Yvonne enters and while Jack hides, Master Graham (Christopher Jacot), a local blacksmith whom she loves, visits her. Jack then attempts to steal Merlin's wand while Merlin concentrates on the whereabouts of the Grail. Merlin senses the visitor, and at first evicts him, but later apprentices Jack after a vision of the Holy Grail appears to both of them.

The only training the film shows is Merlin tempting Jack with food while telling Jack to resist his hunger and seek a ring that was lost in the castle (which turns out to be the former Round Table). It is around this time that Jack learns the truth of Brian, who is actually Brianna (Meghan Ory). She disguises herself in order to avenge a wrong done to her family.

In his search for the grail, Merlin suspects something is afoul in Camelot that caused the Grail to depart. Merlin confronts Yvonne (who is to be married to Lord Weston when the Grail returns) and her guardian Master Burton (Andrew Jackson). Later while touching the Grail's stand, Merlin sees a vision in which he learns the truth of his absence. The Lady of the Lake (Miranda Richardson) enchanted him and created Jack. Thus, Jack's father is Merlin and his mother is the Lady.

Barbarians threaten Camelot's door, and knights including Brian want to use an enchanted cave in order to surprise the invaders, who they think are building a dam to drown the kingdom. Jack agrees to lift Merlin's enchantment on the passage, but the knights find no construction. In the meantime, the barbarians directed by the Lady of the Lake enter the passage and breach Camelot's walls, which are vulnerable from the inside.

Realizing the impending doom, Merlin tells Jack the truth of his origins. Merlin and Jack coordinate to magic a bridge over the barbarian army to safety, but when Brianna is put in danger, Merlin tells Jack to go to her and completes the bridge alone (an effort that fatally drains him) commanding the townspeople, including Jack, to escape. As Jack steps off the bridge he breaks the spell to foil the pursuers. Meanwhile, Merlin was left in the walls of Camelot and is killed by Rauskaug (Alexander Kalugin), the leader of the barbarians.

=== Part II ===
The remaining people of Camelot have traveled the countryside for several months, seeking the Grail while fleeing their enemy. Jack is frustrated that his concentration does not give him insight, so the Lady of the Lake sends him a vision of the Grail's whereabouts. The group goes there, to discover that the water is cursed and several knights are murdered by a beast as they attempt to swim to the Grail's cave. Meanwhile, the Lady has told Rauskaug of their location and the barbarians begin their pursuit.

The film centers on the crimes of the Camelot's guardians, which they believe prevent their reaching of the Grail. Yvonne's parents presented her as Gawain's kin but this ruse is discovered when she begs Jack to explore her past through visions. Through these it is discovered that Master Burton and Lord Weston had oppressed the surrounding peoples with taxes, unfair trade, and devious agreements. This is the source of Brianna's anger, as her family was robbed of its property through such a contract.

Before Jack goes through Yvonne's past, Yvonne and Graham (Yvonne's true love) go behind a tree and kiss. In that time Jack and Brianna decide to give in to love. They are caught kissing by the other two and Jack tries to put it off as a joke. Yvonne and Graham now know Brian is a girl but won't tell anyone.

In the meantime, Burton hopes to betroth Yvonne to a Scottish king and indenture the remaining citizens of Camelot to that lord for personal gain. Yvonne and Jack reveal Burton and his wife's past treachery, and instead of a quick execution Jack hopes a trial will cleanse Camelot of its sins. Instead Brianna takes justice into her own hands and kills the pair as the barbarians approach.

While the two sides battle, Lord Weston accompanies Jack to the cave. Jack parts the waterfall, and they enter the cave. Jack warns Weston that he is the true stain on Camelot and advises him not to take the Grail. When Weston touches it, his impurity turns him to dust. The Lady of the Lake appears and offers Jack a chance to become powerful. Instead he rejects his mother (apparently killing her) and makes a wish of the Grail: Jack says that the Grail may do what it wishes with him, if it will only end the destruction outside. The Grail accepts this unselfish act, and reanimates the dead warriors on both sides. Graham holds it aloft and promises a new Camelot will be built.

Graham and Yvonne marry. During the reconstruction, Sir Snout tells Jack to speak the name of the land of the dead (Tartarus) in order to see his father. Jack goes to Merlin, and the two are allowed to spend the time they did not have as father and son. The film concludes by hinting that Jack and Brianna are now married and probably going to have children. The film ends when Jack picks up Brianna as she blows out a candle.

== Cast ==
- Sam Neill as Merlin
- Miranda Richardson as The Lady of The Lake
- Garwin Sanford as Lord Weston
- John Reardon as Jack
- Tegan Moss as Yvonne
- Christopher Jacot as Master Graham
- Meghan Ory as Brianna
- Andrew Jackson as Master Burton

== See also ==
- List of works based on Arthurian legends
