= Reunion Pacific Entertainment =

Canadian studio

Reunion Pacific Entertainment Inc.
- Formerly: Reunion Pictures
- Type: Subsidiary
- Industry: Film; Television
- Founded: 2004
- Headquarters: Vancouver, British Columbia
- Website: reunionpacificentertainment.com

Reunion Pacific Entertainment Inc. is a Canadian studio based in Vancouver, that was formed in 2017. It produced movies and television series such Amazon Prime's The Man in the High Castle (2015-2019) and Greg Daniels' newest comedy Upload (2020–2025). Most recently RPE produced the new Lord of the Rings television series; The Rings of Power (2022 - Present) for Amazon Prime Video, Gil Netter's (producer of the award-winning film The Blind Side) film "Mixtape" for Netflix, and "Out of My Mind" (not yet released) for Disney+, Participant and Big Beach. Prior productions include limited series Tin Man (which was nominated for nine Primetime Emmy Awards in 2008 including the Outstanding Mini-series category and multiple categories related to films special effects, costuming, editing, and sound editing); as well as the television series Continuum which aired its fourth and final season in 2015 on Showcase in Canada, and SyFy in the US and UK.

== Filmography ==
=== Television ===
Year	Title	Network	Notes
2005-2007	Master of Horror	Showtime	Anthology series
2007	Tin Man	Syfy	Limited series
2009	Alice	Syfy	Limited series
2012-2015	Continuum	Showcase	
2015	Olympus	Syfy	
2017	Somewhere Between	ABC	
2015-2019	The Man in the High Castle	Amazon Prime	
2020–2025	Upload	Amazon Prime	
2022-2024	Outer Range	Amazon Prime	
2022	High School	Freevee	
2022-Present	The Lord of the Rings: The Rings of Power	Amazon Prime	
2026–present	Every Year After	Amazon Prime	

=== Films ===
Year	Title	Network	Notes
2013	The Baby Sellers	Lifetime	TV movie
2018	No One Would Tell	Lifetime	TV movie
2019	Death of a Cheerleader	Lifetime	TV movie
2021	The Voyeurs	Amazon Prime	
2021	Mixtape	Netflix	
2022	Don't Make Me Go	Amazon Prime	
2024	Out Of My Mind	Disney+	
