= Jonathan Lloyd Walker =

British actor

- Born: 13 September 1973 (age 52); Henley on Thames, Oxfordshire, England
- Occupation: Actor
- Years active: 1993–present
- Children: 3
- Website: www.jonathanlloydwalker.com

Jonathan Lloyd Walker is an English actor, writer and producer. He is known for film roles in Shooter, Red, and as the British radio operator Colin in The Thing (2011 prequel). He also played Rankol in the TV-series Flash Gordon.

== Early life ==
Jonathan Lloyd Walker was born in Henley on Thames, Oxfordshire, England and attended Shiplake C of E Primary School. When he was a toddler when his mother took him to auditions for commercials. He appeared in numerous school plays, several of which were choreographed by the mother of his school mate, actor Christian Bale.

Walker's parents divorced, and his mother married a Canadian. The family moved to Montreal, Quebec, Canada in the early 1980s. As well as school plays, he studied and performed with the Children's Theatre of Montreal and made appearances in short amateur films.

He attended the University of Western Ontario and studied Political Science. Also during this time he enlisted in the Canadian Armed Forces and successfully completed training as an infantry officer attached to the Royal Canadian Regiment. After completing his service Walker returned to acting after a brief stint writing and reading the news for CBC News Network in Toronto.

== Career ==
Walker performed in roles in the television film Volcano: Fire on the Mountain, the series Viper, and multiple appearances on the series The X-Files. Later he played more extensive roles such as Mark Twain in The Secret Adventures of Jules Verne and Jesus Christ in The Second Coming. He has appeared in such films as Traitor, Shooter, Along Came a Spider and Land of the Dead. His long list of television credits includes The West Wing, Men in Trees, The Outer Limits and Smallville. He also played the leading role of Rankol in the Syfy Network series Flash Gordon.

In 2010 Walker has completed work in several feature films, most notably Red with Helen Mirren, Bruce Willis and Morgan Freeman. He plays the character Burbacher who is in charge of protecting the Vice-President from assassins.

Walker was also cast in Matthijs van Heijningen Jr.'s prequel to the 1982 John Carpenter classic The Thing. He portrayed the British character Colin who is the base radio operator. The film opened in 2011.

== Family ==
Walker has three children.

== Filmography ==
Year	Title	Role	Notes
1995	Cyberjack	Dieter / Probe Tech	
1996	Carpool	SWAT Team Guy	
1998	The Falling	The Bartender	
2001	Along Came a Spider	Reporter #5	
2001	Dangerous Child	Officer J. Driscoll	TV movie
2005	Land of the Dead	Cliff Woods	
2007	Shooter	Louis Dobbler	
2008	Traitor	MI6 Agent Hayes	
2010	Transparency	Lubitsch	
2010	Red	Agent Burbache	
2011	The Thing	Colin	
2015	Vendetta	Lester	
2020	Snowpiercer	John "Big John"	Season 1
