= Pat Williams (director) =

Canadian television director and producer

- Born: Patrick Williams
- Occupation(s): Director and producer
- Years active: 1984–present

Pat Williams (sometimes credited as Patrick Williams) is a Canadian television director and producer.

Working since the 1980s as a camera operator on such films as Police Academy (1984) and Cool Runnings (1993). Making his directorial debut in 1997, he has directed episodes of CONTINUUM, The Secret World of Alex Mack. Some of his other television credits include Romeo!, So Weird, Strange Days at Blake Holsey High, Kyle XY, Smallville, Instant Star, Degrassi: The Next Generation, Kevin Hill, Aaron Stone, The Troop and Shattered.
