= John Reardon =

Canadian actor (born 1975)

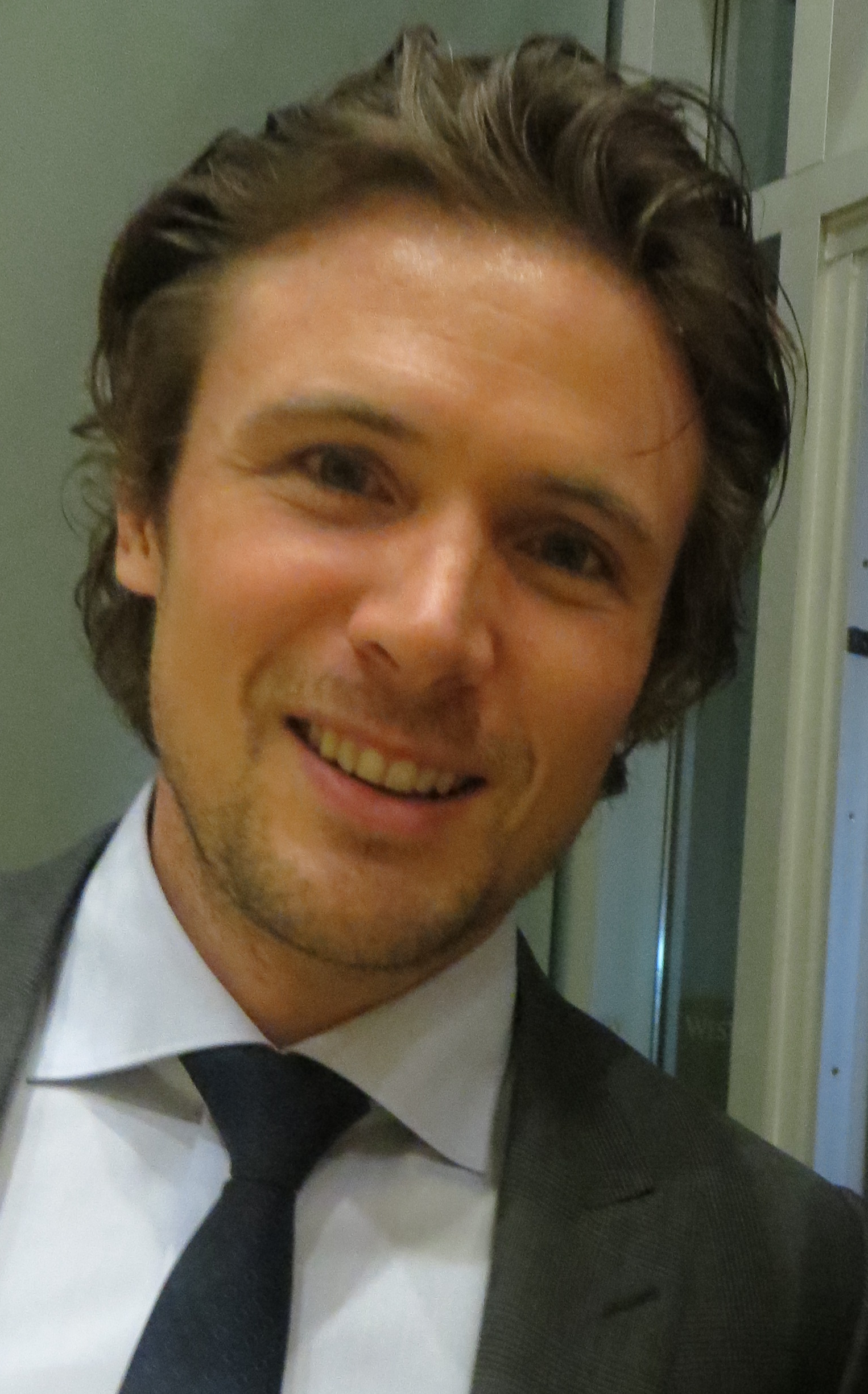
- Reardon at the 2013 Leo Awards
- Born: John Henry Reardon; July 30, 1975 (age 51); Halifax, Nova Scotia, Canada
- Education: Mount Allison University, B.S. 1997
- Occupation: Actor
- Years active: 2001–present
- Spouse: Meghan Ory (m. 2008)
- Children: 3
- Website: Website

John Henry Reardon (born July 30, 1975) is a Canadian actor. Prior to 2015, Reardon starred as Blake Laviolette on the CBC Television series Arctic Air and had a recurring role as Greg Cameron on the Showcase series Continuum. Starting in 2019, Reardon stars as Detective Charlie Hudson on the Canadian television series Hudson & Rex.

== Life and career ==
Born July 30, 1975, in Halifax, Nova Scotia, Reardon studied Theatre Arts at the Lir Academy of Dramatic Arts in Dublin, Ireland as well as improv at The Second City in Los Angeles, California, and Toronto, Ontario. While at Mount Alison University, Reardon considered pursuing a career in medicine, but growing up, his dream was to become a professional athlete. He was an all-star Canadian football player for Mount Allison while he attended university there from 1993 to 1997. He graduated with a Bachelor of Science in biology.

John Reardon's very first professional acting appearance was using his full birth name John Henry Reardon in 2001 as a guest on the Showtime comedy-drama series The Chris Isaak Show, playing a character named Bruce in the season 1 episode "Our Place".

In 2006, he appeared in the miniseries Merlin's Apprentice as Jack. Reardon met his future wife Meghan Ory on the set of that show. Other TV show and movie roles include Randall Thompson on Tru Calling, Heath in White Chicks, and Jeremiah in Scary Movie 4. From 2012 to 2014, he had roles on both CBC's Arctic Air and Showcase's Continuum.

On Arctic Air, John Reardon portrayed Blake Laviolette, a young, good-looking "Top Gun-type" pilot who was secretly involved with his coworker and fellow pilot Krista Ivarson. According to Reardon, his character is "a fascinating duality because Blake is a bit of a cocky hotshot pilot who, I think, just found himself in the north and Yellowknife as a bit of a stepping stone to moving to what he probably considered his dream job. However, once he gets there, he starts to realize that there's something about that part of the country that gets to people. In fact, it starts to get to him and he begins to fall in love with the north, followed by Krista (Pascale Hutton). The priorities he had before all this end up changing and Blake becomes almost a prouder Yellowknifer than anyone else."

On Continuum Reardon played Greg Cameron, the husband of the main character, Kiera Cameron. According to Reardon, "Greg on the surface appears to be a clean-cut family man who is a respectable law-abiding member of society. The memory of Greg, along with their son Sam, is an anchor for Kiera when she is transported back in time and taken away from her family. However, as season one progresses, it appears that Greg may not be what he seems."

Reardon played the role of Prospero in Shakespeare's work The Tempest at Shaw Theatre in London.

=== Hudson & Rex ===
For the seven seasons that aired from 2019 to 2025, Reardon co-starred in Hudson & Rex with Diesel vom Burgimwald and several other pedigreed German Shepherd Dogs who were Diesel's nephews and cousins in the title roles of the Canadian hit series. The show is a remake of the European series Inspector Rex that aired for two decades in Austria and Italy.

Hudson is a recently divorced detective in the St. John's Police Department, located in St. John's, Newfoundland and Labrador, Canada. Rex is a police dog (K-9, "highly trained law enforcement animal") whose human K-9 officer partner was killed as they chased a suspect. Hudson was the only one at the scene who was able to convince Rex to step away from his partner's body and get into a van. The two formed an unbreakable bond as they began to work cases together as partners. About their close partnership, Reardon said, "Charlie's looking for some companionship since he's on his own. Rex fills that void for him and they work really well together."

Reardon continued in the role and acted as an executive producer on the show from season 4 until midway through season 7. As he had tonsil cancer, he had to take a leave of absence for treatment. During Reardon's recovery, the Hudson & Rex production team cast Luke Roberts in the role of the character named "Detective Mark". For most of season 7, Reardon appeared in episodes by phone where Hudson calls from South America where he is searching for his lost brother. After Reardon's recovery, the producers decided to keep Roberts as Detective Mark Hudson, effectively ending Reardon's employment on the show.

In September 2025, John Reardon let fans know through his own personal Instagram account that he would not be returning to Hudson & Rex, writing: "After taking a couple months to go through cancer treatment, I was given a clean bill of health and cleared and ready to return to work. But the team chose to go in a different direction". The announcement drew significant backlash from viewers, many of whom criticized the show's producers. One fan purchased a full-page advertisement in The Toronto Star asking why Reardon was let go. In response, Shaftesbury, the show's production company, issued a statement through The Toronto Star saying: "Given the uncertainty around John's ability and timing to return to work on the series, producers agreed that the show would move forward without him,"

Reardon would return to Hudson and Rex for season 9, teased on social media on May 27, 2026 with a full announcement the following day.

John's wife, Meghan Ory appears in several episodes of Hudson & Rex, playing the supervisor of Hudson's boss.

== Personal life ==
In 2008, Reardon married actress Meghan Ory. They had previously worked together on the miniseries Merlin's Apprentice. Their first child was born in 2018, their second in 2019 and their third in 2023. The Reardon family has a YouTube series where they show and discuss the renovation of their 120-year old house.

== Filmography ==
=== Film ===
| Year | Title | Role | Notes |
|---|---|---|---|
| 2004 | White Chicks | Heath | |
| 2005 | Fallen | The Man | Short film |
| 2006 | Scary Movie 4 | Jeremiah | |
| 2008 | Make It Happen | Joel | |
| 2010 | Super Hybrid | David | |
| 2010 | Tron: Legacy | Young Kevin Flynn / Clu (body double) | |

=== Television ===
| Year | Title | Role | Notes |
|---|---|---|---|
| 2001 | The Chris Isaak Show | Bruce | Credited as John Henry Reardon |
| 2002–05 | Edgemont | Josh Wyatt | Recurring role (11 episodes) |
| 2002 | The Twilight Zone | Sam | Episode: "Dream Lover" |
| 2002 | The Real World Movie: The Lost Season | Adam | TV film |
| 2003 | Andromeda | Luck | Credited as John Henry Reardon; Episode: "Answers Given to Questions Never Asked" |
| 2003 | 1st to Die | David Brandt | Credited as John Henry Reardon |
| 2004 | Tru Calling | Randall Thompson | 3 episodes |
| 2004 | The Thing Below | Lance Taylor | Video short |
| 2005 | Severed | Greg | TV film |
| 2006 | Merlin's Apprentice | Jack | TV film |
| 2006 | The L Word | Resident / Young Dad | 2 episodes |
| 2007 | Painkiller Jane | Brian | 9 episodes |
| 2007 | Blue Smoke | Josh | TV film |
| 2007 | A Valentine Carol | Matt | TV film |
| 2008 | 7 Things to Do Before I'm 30 | Danny | TV film |
| 2008 | Son of the Dragon | D.B. | TV film |
| 2010 | Eureka | Dr. Derek Thergood | Episode: "Stoned" |
| 2011 | Hellcats | Jimmy | Episode: "Fancy Dan" |
| 2011 | Bringing Ashley Home | David Powell | TV film |
| 2011 | Clue | Wheeler | 2 episodes |
| 2012 | Deadly Hope | Michael Kirby | TV film |
| 2012 | The Philadelphia Experiment | Deputy Carl Reed | TV film |
| 2012–14 | Arctic Air | Blake Laviolette | Main cast (Seasons 1–3; 35 episodes) |
| 2012–14 | Continuum | Greg Cameron | Recurring cast (Seasons 1–3; 10 episodes) |
| 2013 | Supernatural | Shane / Prometheus | Episode: "Remember the Titans" |
| 2014 | The Christmas Secret | Jason | TV film |
| 2014 | When Calls the Heart | Nate | 2 episodes |
| 2016 | Love on the Sidelines | Danny Holland | TV film |
| 2016 | I'll Be Home for Christmas | Detective Mike Kelley | TV film |
| 2019–2025, 2026– | Hudson & Rex | Detective Charlie Hudson | Main role Season 1 to 7, 9 |
| 2021 | Cypher | Antoine | 5 episodes |
| 2024 | Believe in Christmas | Ethan | Hallmark Movie |
| 2025 | Disrepair | Greg Thomas | Miniseries |
