= Omari Newton =

Canadian actor (born 1981)

Omari Akil Newton
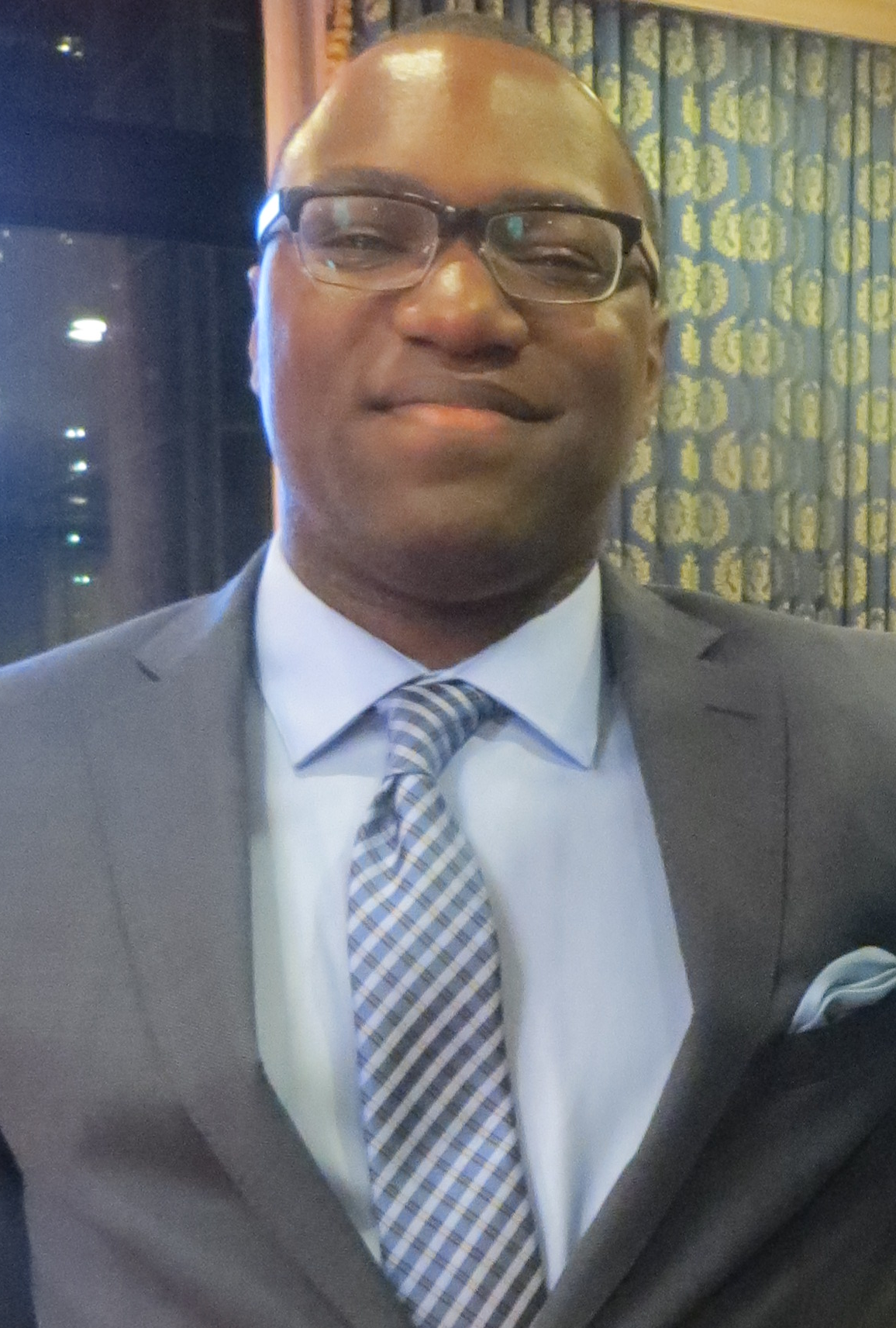
- Newton at the 2014 Leo Awards
- Born: January 7, 1981; Montreal, Quebec, Canada
- Occupation: Actor
- Years active: 2001–present

Omari Akil Newton (born January 7, 1981) is a Canadian actor. He is best known for playing the roles of Larry Summers in Blue Mountain State and Lucas Ingram in Continuum. Newton is the co-founder of Boldskool Productions.

== n Early life ==
Newton grew up in Montreal. His parents were immigrants from Trinidad and Tobago. In the 1990s, he went to Beaconsfield High School along with his sister. At school, Newton was the co-captain of the basketball team and starter for the local football team, but also went to the drama clubs. To become a professional actor Newton took drama courses at Concordia University, where he did his BA in communication studies. He also went to the National Theatre School of Canada.

== Career ==
When Newton was 19 years old, he was hired by the Black Theatre Workshop and got a lead role in one of their productions. He worked in the Montreal theatre scene for several years until he moved to Vancouver. During his early days in Vancouver Newton did a lot of theatre. He appeared in Romeo & Juliet with Mad Duck Theatre Collective and The Oresteia at Christ Church Cathedral.

In 2001 Newton auditioned for the role of Dalton Nemers in the teenage vampire series Vampire High. He was directly booked after his first read for the role. He later mentioned that he really enjoyed the time at the set. He also liked that his character was pivotal in the story of one of the lead vampires. During those days, it was his first role on a TV series and his biggest role on film or TV. Before that, he only had a few one-liners in some TV movies.

From 2010 to 2011, Newton played Larry Summers in Blue Mountain State. The college comedy series is about a fictional university and its football team. Larry was Newton's first regular role on a television series.

From 2012 to 2015, Newton starred as Lucas Ingram in Continuum.

In 2014, Diane Roberts directed Newton's play Sal Capone: The Lamentable Tragedy Of with Urban Ink Productions. Newton and Roberts' collaboration led to the formation of Boldskool Productions, a hip hop theatre company. In 2018, Boldskool re-staged Sal Capone: The Lamentable Tragedy Of with Holding Space and the NAC English Theatre. Newton began writing Sal Capone in 2008 after the police shooting of unarmed Fredy Villanueva. Newton has been commissioned by Black Theatre Workshop to write Black & Blue Matters, a companion piece to Sal Capone.

== Personal life ==
Newton has a twin sister named Akilah Newton.

== Plays ==
- Sal Capone: The Lamentable Tragedy Of

== Filmography ==
=== Television ===
Year	Title	Role	Notes
2001	Vampire High	Dalton Nemers	"The Summoning" (Season 1, Episode 13)
2005	15/Love	Carson Greene	"Volley of the Dolls" (Season 2, Episode 14)
2006	Blade: The Series	Veteran	"Delivery" (Season 1, Episode 6)
2008	Sophie	Remy	"The Tornado" (Season 1, Episode 1) "Birth Control" (Season 1, Episode 4) "Read the Signs" (Season 1, Episode 12)
2009	V	Soldier	Pilot
2010	Fringe	Security Guard	"The Bishop Revival" (Season 2, Episode 14)
2010	Shattered	Uniform	"The Sins of Fathers" (Season 1, Episode 1)
2010–2011	Blue Mountain State	Larry Summers	Recurring role, 31 episodes
2012–2015	Continuum	Lucas Ingram	Main role
2013	Supernatural	Peter Kent's Demon	"Clip Show" (Season 8, Episode 22")
2016	The X-Files	Rogers	"Founder's Mutation"
2017	Tarzan and Jane	Chief Wazari (voice)	Recurring role
2017	Marvel Super Hero Adventures	Black Panther (voice)	Recurring role
2018–2024	The Dragon Prince	Corvus (voice)	Recurring role

=== Film ===
Year	Title	Role	Notes
2002	Redeemer	Sean	TV movie
2003	The Reagans	Angry Protester #1	TV movie
2004	L'hôtel de l'avenir	African Student	
2005	Slow Burn	Limo Driver	uncredited
2006	Time Bomb	Electrician	TV movie
2006	Last Exit	Bank Manager	TV movie
2007	12 Ways to Say I'm Sorry	Buster	short
2008	Radical Rifle Icon	Blake	short
2012	The Factory	Buffalo Police Officer - Cop in Basement	
2015	Blue Mountain State: The Rise of Thadland	Larry Summers	
2017	S.W.A.T.: Under Siege	Benson	Direct-to-video
