= Jeff F. King =

Canadian screenwriter and director

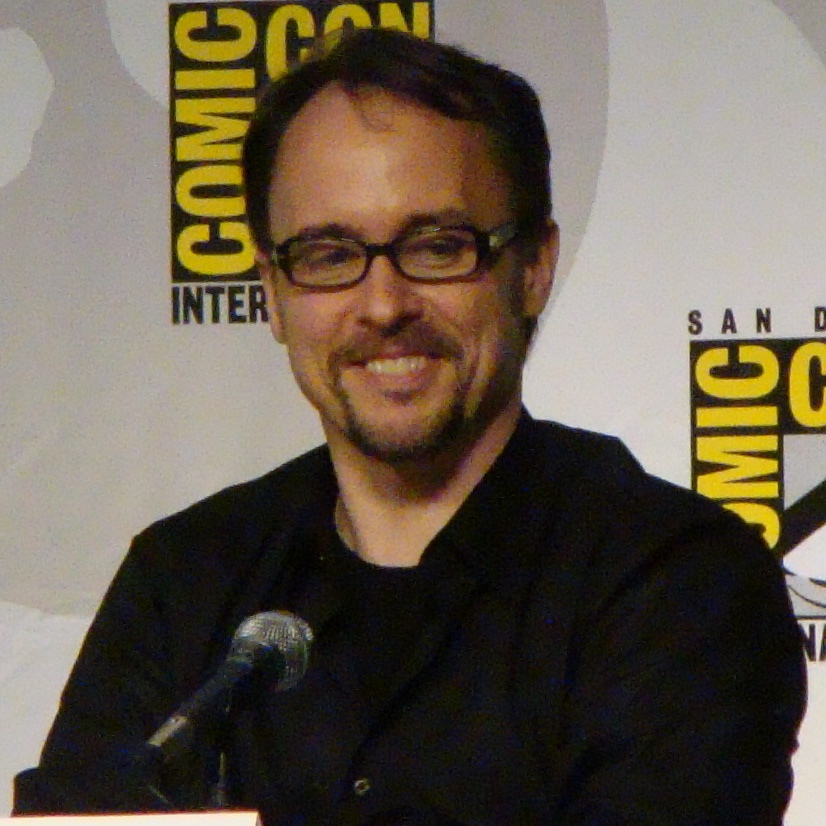
King at the 2010 Comic-Con International

Jeff F. King is a Canadian screenwriter, comics writer, television producer and film director. King served as co-executive (1994–95) and then executive producer (1995–96) for the Canadian television series Due South and was the co-recipient of three Gemini Awards. He then worked as the producer of the CBS show EZ Streets and as co-executive producer for Stargate SG-1. His other television credits include Relic Hunter, Strange Days at Blake Holsey High, Mutant X, Dinosapien, White Collar, The Umbrella Academy, and The Acolyte.

As a comics writer, he wrote the 2015 DC Comics series "Convergence", for which he created the character Telos, the decoy central antagonist-turned anti-hero of the story.
