= Janet Kidder =

Canadian actress

- Born: 1972 (age 53–54); Cranbrook, British Columbia, Canada
- Occupation: Actress
- Years active: 1997–present
- Relatives: Margot Kidder (aunt)

Janet Kidder (born 1972) is a Canadian actress known for her role of Osyraa in Star Trek: Discovery.

== Biography ==
Janet Kidder is the daughter of John Kidder and the niece of actress Margot Kidder. She was born in Cranbrook, B.C., the family moving to England when she was two, where she stayed until graduating before returning to Canada.

== Career ==
Janet and Margot Kidder both appeared in "Walk on By", an episode of La Femme Nikita, as the younger and older Roberta, Nikita's mother. Janet's participation was in brief flashback sequences. She plays the character Lila Jacobs in the series Man in the High Castle and Osyraa in Star Trek: Discovery.

== Filmography ==
=== Film ===
Year	Title	Role	Notes
1997	Men with Guns	Crystal	
1998	A Cool, Dry Place	Carol Holman	
1998	Bride of Chucky	Diane	
1999	Too Much Sex	Amber	Working title The Three-Hundred and Ninety First
2001	XChange	Alison De Waay	
2001	Century Hotel	Beth	
2001	Dead Awake	Kimberly 'Kick' Birmingham	AKA Dead of Night
2003	Dark Side	Megan / Jane Wright	AKA Darkness Falling
2004	Ginger Snaps 2: Unleashed	Alice Severson	
2011	Knockout	Christine Miller	AKA, Born to Fight
2012	Beat Down	Roxy LaRue	
2013	Words and Pictures	Sabine	
2014	Grace: The Possession	Nurse	
2016	Brain on Fire	Dr. Siskin	
2020	Operation Christmas Drop	Lieutenant Colonel Blaine	
2025	The Monkey	Mrs. Campbell - Ricky's Mother	

=== Television ===
Year	Title	Role	Notes
1997	The Absolute Truth	Co-Ed	TV film
1997	Bad to the Bone	Phoebe	TV film
1998	Thanks of a Grateful Nation	Rosca	TV film
1998	The Girl Next Door	Deputy Colleen	TV film
1998–99	La Femme Nikita	Vizcano / Roberta (young)	Episodes: "First Mission", "Walk on By"
1998–2000	Made in Canada	Lisa Sutton	Main role (seasons 1–2)
1999	Psi Factor	Christine Ambrose	Episodes: "Y2K", "Forever and a Day: Part 1"
1999	Earth: Final Conflict	Julia Cook	Recurring role (season 2)
1999	Sea People	Ms. Busby	TV film
2000	The War Next Door	Kelly Bismuth	Episode : "The End of the World as We Know It: Part 1"
2000	Strong Medicine		Episode: "Pilot"
2000	Blessed Stranger: After Flight 111	Cheryl Barkhouse	TV film
2001	A Mother's Fight for Justice		TV film
2001	The Big Heist	Maria	TV film
2002–2004	Tom Stone	Cpl. Marina Del Luzio	Main role, AKA Stone Undercover
2003	Defending Our Kids: The Julie Posey Story	Cassandra Harris	TV film
2004	Casualty	Pippa Parker	Episode: "Three's a Crowd"
2005	Doctors	Francesca Rodriguez	Episodes: "For the Best: Parts 1 & 2"
2007	Superstorm	TV Interviewer	TV miniseries
2010	Supernatural	Mandy Duren	Episode: "All Dogs Go to Heaven"
2011	The Legend of Dick and Dom	Vorderman	Episode: "Valley of the Bigheads"
2011	Magic Beyond Words: The J.K. Rowling Story	Anne Rowling	TV film
2011	Innocent	Marta	TV film
2012	Fringe	Dr. Brody	Episode: "Making Angels"
2012	The Killing	Dr. Carey	Episode: "72 Hours"
2012	Ring of Fire	Anna Janen	Episode: "Night 2"
2012–2014	Continuum	Ann Sadler	Recurring role (seasons 1–3)
2013	Motive	Melinda	Episode: "Detour"
2013	Rogue	Nancy	Episodes: "Fireball", "Sweet and Sour", "Hawala"
2013	Delete	Elizabeth Hardington	TV miniseries
2014	Gracepoint	Sara Burke	Recurring role
2015	Garage Sale Mystery: The Deadly Room	Adrian	TV film
2015	Rookie Blue	Sylvia Blake	Episode: "Ninety Degrees"
2015–16	Arrow	Ruvé Adams	Recurring role (season 4)
2016	The X-Files	Nurse	Episode: "Babylon"
2016	Dead of Summer	Waitress / Mrs. Sykes	Episodes: "Barney Rubble Eyes", "The Dharma Bums", "Townie"
2016	Aftermath	Aunt Sally	Guest role
2017	Cop and a Half: New Recruit	Captain	TV film
2017	Somewhere Between	Marjorie Spencer	Episodes: "For One to Live", "One Must Die"
2018	Cooking with Love	Amanda	TV film
2018	Signed, Sealed, Delivered: To the Altar	Annaliese	TV film
2018	The Man in the High Castle	Lila Jacobs	Recurring role (season 3)
2019	Limetown	Lenore Dougal	3 episodes
2020–2021	Star Trek: Discovery	Osyraa	Recurring role (season 3)
2021	Two Sentence Horror Stories	Janitor	1 episode: "Elliot"
2023	Little Bird	Jeannie	Miniseries, 6 episodes
2025	My Life with the Walter Boys	Joanne Wagner	Recurring role (season 2)
2025	The Hunting Party	Denise Glenn	1 episode: "Denise Glenn"

== Awards and nominations ==
In 2002 Kidder was nominated for a Gemini Award, in the category of Best Performance by an Actor in a Continuing Leading Dramatic Role, for her performance in the television series Tom Stone.

She has twice been nominated for Leo Awards; first in 2013 in the category of Best Supporting Performance by a Female: Television Movie for Ring of Fire and again in 2021 in the category of Best Supporting Performance by a Female: Dramatic Series for Two Sentence Horror Stories episode "Elliot".
