= Erik Knudsen =

Canadian actor (born 1988)

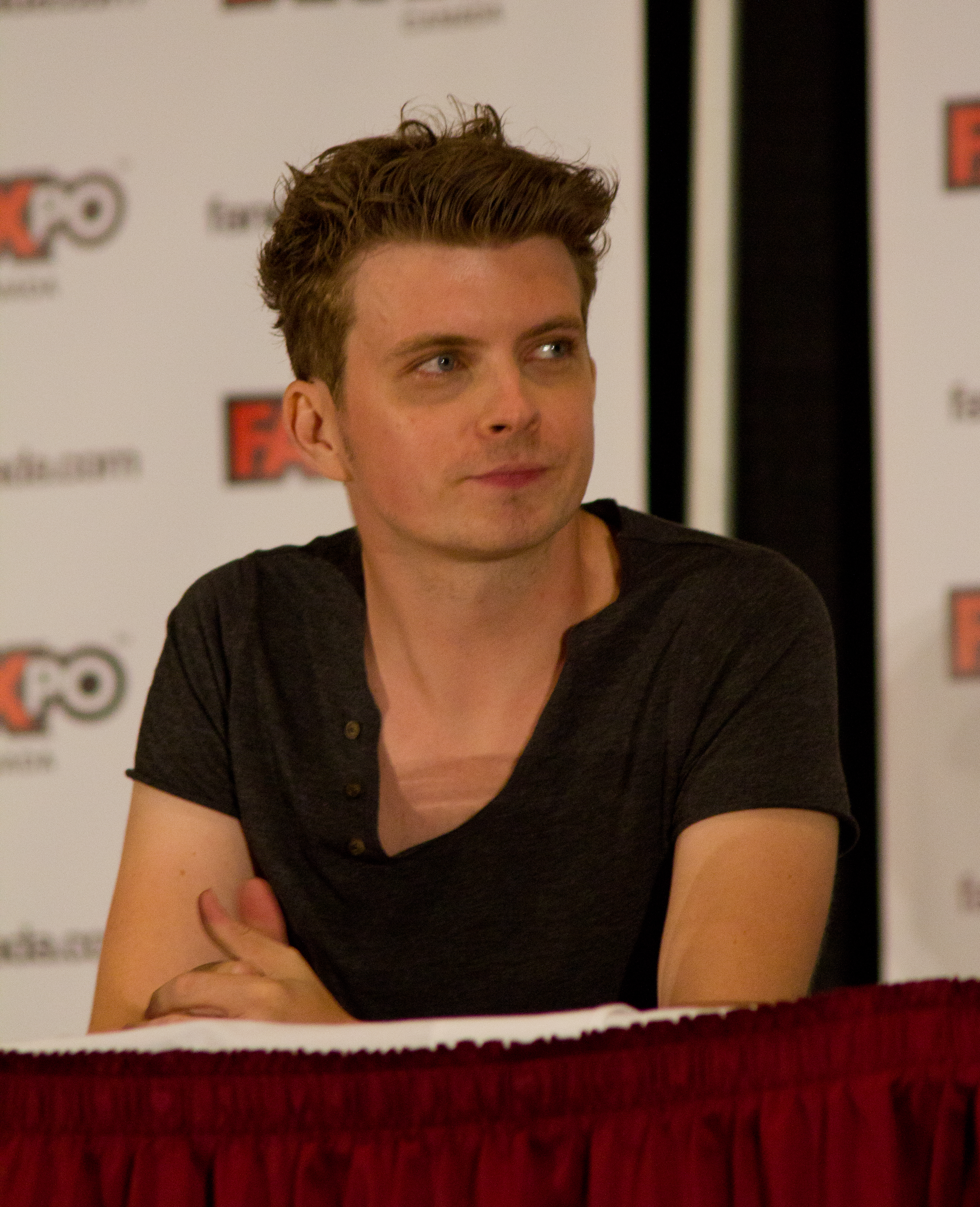
- Knudsen in 2012
- Born: March 25, 1988 (age 38); Toronto, Ontario, Canada
- Occupation: Actor
- Years active: 1999–present

Erik Knudsen (born March 25, 1988) is a Canadian actor. He initially gained attention for his main role as Donovan Mackay on the YTV television series Mental Block (2003–2004) before his breakout with a starring role in the horror film Saw II (2005).

Knudsen received further mainstream recognition for his main role as Dale Turner on the CBS post-apocalyptic drama series Jericho (2006–2008), as well as his starring role in the black comedy film Bon Cop, Bad Cop (2006). In the 2010s, Knudsen most notably had a main role as Alec Sadler on the Showcase science fiction series Continuum (2012–2015). He also starred in the films Scream 4 (2011) and Bon Cop, Bad Cop 2 (2017), and had supporting roles in the films Scott Pilgrim vs. the World (2010) and Beastly (2011).

== Life and career ==
Knudsen was born on March 25, 1988, in Toronto, Ontario. His first film debut was in the 2000 film Tribulation.

In 2001, Knudsen guest starred on The Guardian and appeared in three other episodes. He was nominated for a Young Artist Award for his performance. In 2003, Knudsen starred in the TV series Mental Block. He co-starred as Leroy "Lefty" in the film adaptation of Youth in Revolt, and in Scott Pilgrim vs. the World as Lucas "Crash" Wilson, who was the lead singer of fictional band Crash and the Boys. In 2005, he co-starred in the horror film Saw II. From 2006 to 2008, he played the series regular role, Dale Turner in the CBS series Jericho.

Knudsen portrayed Robbie in the 2011 slasher film Scream 4. Knudsen played Ryan in The Barrens, co-starring True Blood's Stephen Moyer, which was released in late 2012.

He portrayed teen tech genius Alec Sadler in the Canadian science fiction series Continuum, starring alongside Rachel Nichols and Victor Webster, and was nominated for Best Supporting Actor for the role for two consecutive years at the Saturn Awards. He appears in Bon Cop, Bad Cop 2, the horror feature Darker Than Night, as well as Stephen King-based sci-fi TV series The Mist and space adventure drama series Killjoys.

== Filmography ==
=== Film ===
List of films and roles
Year	Title	Role	Notes
2000	Tribulation	Young Tom Canboro	First film role
2005	Saw II	Daniel Matthews	
2006	Bon Cop, Bad Cop	Jonathan Ward	
2006	A Lobster Tale	Timmy Brock	
2009	Youth in Revolt	Leroy "Lefty"	
2010	Scott Pilgrim vs. the World	Lucas "Crash" Wilson	
2010	Saw 3D	Daniel Matthews	Archive footage; uncredited
2011	Beastly	Trey Madison	
2011	Scream 4	Robbie Mercer	
2012	The Barrens	Ryan	
2017	Bon Cop, Bad Cop 2	Jonathan Ward	
2018	Blindsided	Toby	
2021	Heart of Champions	Rower	
2024	The Camp Host	Blake	

=== Television ===
List of television appearances and roles
Year	Title	Role	Notes
1999	I Was a Sixth Grade Alien!	Kenny the Collector / Kenny	Episode: "They Saved Grandpa's Brain!"; Episode: "Floormat from the Putrid Lagoon"
1999	Real Kids, Real Adventures	Alex Schreffler	Episode: "Heimlich Hero: The Michelle Shreffler Story"
2000	In a Heartbeat	Jason	Episode: "You Say It's Your Birthday"
2000	The Wonderful World of Disney	Nasty Boy	Episode: Santa Who?
2000	Common Ground	Young Johnny Burroughs	Television film
2000	Santa Who?	Nasty Boy	Television film
2001– 2002	The Guardian	Hunter Reed	4 episodes
2001	Blackout	Ian Robbins	Television film
2001	The Familiar Stranger	Young Chris Welsh	Television film
2001	Doc	Mitch	2 episodes
2003– 2004	Mental Block	Donovan Mackay	26 episodes
2003	Full-Court Miracle	T.J. Murphy	Television film
2004	Blue Murder	Jake Green	Episode: "Janet Green"
2005	Kevin Hill	Ryan Stallinger	Episode: "Losing Isn't Everything"
2006	Booky Makes Her Mark	Arthur Thomson	Television film
2006– 2008	Jericho	Dale Turner	18 episodes
2008	Flashpoint	Jackson Barcliffe	Episode: "The Element of Surprise"
2012	Saving Hope	Mitchell	Episode: "Pilot"
2012– 2015	Continuum	Alec Sadler	42 episodes Nominated—Saturn Award for Best Supporting Actor on Television (2014–16)
2012	Degrassi	Darrin Howe	2 episodes
2014	Not With My Daughter	Dennis Brunner	Television film
2016	12 Monkeys	Thomas Crawford Jr.	Episode: "One Hundred Years"
2017	Ransom	Lucas Hamil	Episode: "Regeneration"
2017	The Mist	Vic	7 episodes
2017	Killjoys	McAvoy	2 episodes
2017	Stickman	Jeremy	Television film
2019	Designated Survivor	Davis Marlowe	Episode: "#scaredsh*tless"
2019	Murdoch Mysteries	Frank Rizzo	Episode: "Toronto the Bad"
2020	Hudson & Rex	Ian Silver	Episode: "Tunnel Vision"
2021	Nine Films About Technology	Cory	Episode: "Digital Gold"
2021	Private Eyes	Bryce	2 episodes
2021	Mayor of Kingstown	Spivey	Episode: "Simply Murder"
2021	So Help Me Todd	Brian McAtee	Episode: "Second Second Chance"
2026	The Way Home	Percival Augustine	6 episodes
