= Stephen Lobo =

Canadian actor (born 1973)

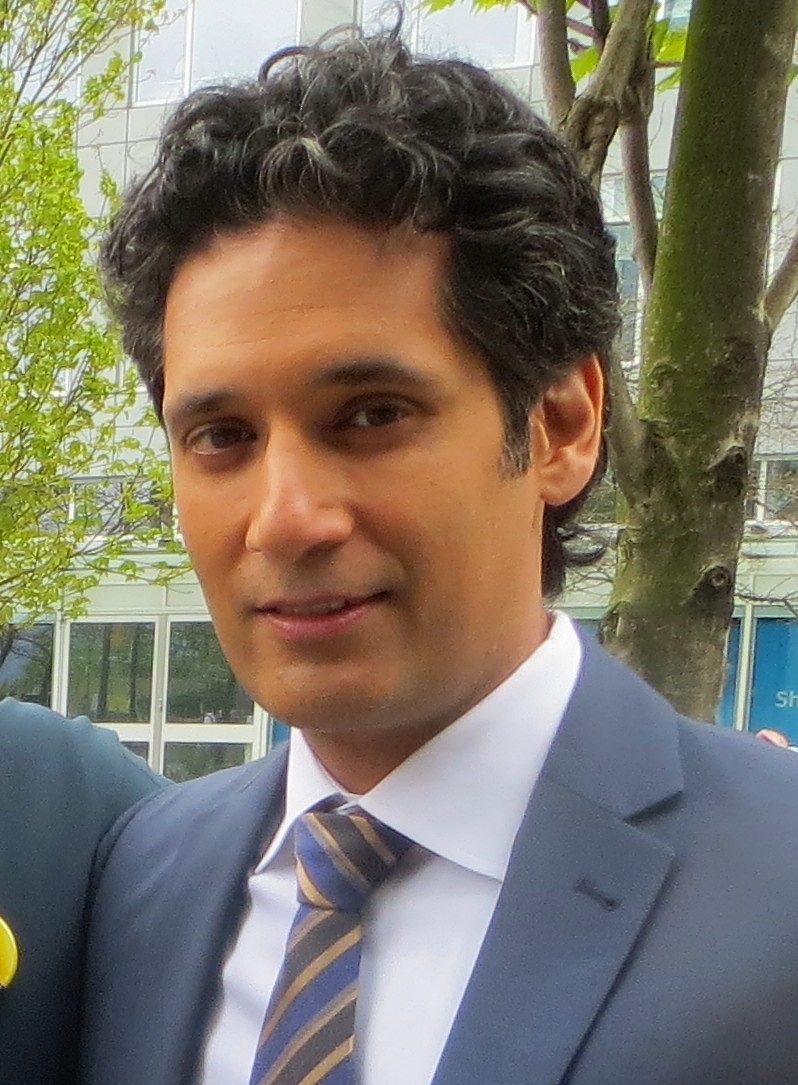
- Lobo in April 2015
- Born: 22 November 1973 (age 51); Toronto, Ontario, Canada
- Occupation: Actor
- Years active: 2004–present

Stephen Lobo (born 22 November 1973) is a Canadian actor, best known for his roles in the television series Arctic Air, Godiva's, Painkiller Jane, Falcon Beach, Little Mosque on the Prairie and Continuum. In 2011, he appeared in Mike Clattenburg's film Afghan Luke.

== Early life ==
Stephen Lobo was born in Toronto, Ontario in 1973. His father, who emigrated to Canada from Tanga, Tanzania, was of Goan Indian descent, while his mother, who is of Iranian descent, is a nurse. Lobo attended the University of Toronto where he studied environmental science. At age 27, he began taking acting classes and moved to the UK, where he earned a three-year degree in drama at Drama Centre London. He appeared in several plays while in England, including The Seagull and Paradise Lost.

== Acting career ==
After doing theatre for several years in both Canada and the United Kingdom, Lobo first came to attention to television audiences as the star of the Canadian drama series Godiva's about a talented chef trying to succeed in the restaurant business. He later landed a leading role in the science fiction series Painkiller Jane (2007) playing a scientist and had a recurring role as an engineer in the second and third seasons of Little Mosque on the Prairie as Jenae ‘J.J’ Jaffer. He played the role of Indian pilot Dev Panwar in the series Arctic Air until it was cancelled in 2014. He starred in the science fiction series Continuum as time-traveling con man Matthew Kellog. In October 2019, Lobo was cast as Jim Corrigan in the Arrowverse crossover "Crisis on Infinite Earths". In 2021, Lobo was cast as Parm Ghuman in the feature film DonkeyHead.

== Filmography ==
=== Film ===
Year	Title	Role	Notes
2006	Love and Other Dilemmas	Henry Diamond	
2006	Kardia	Sanjay	
2010	Fathers & Sons	Cameron / Kama	
2010	Stained	Dave	
2011	Vying for Perfection	Carter	
2011	Afghan Luke	Mateen	
2011	Hamlet	Horatio	
2012	Camera Shy	Dr. Chander	
2012	In No Particular Order	Jay	
2016	Dead Rising: Endgame	Todd	
2019	Killbird	Riad	
2019	Ash	Prosecutor	
2020	An Awkward Balance	Paul	
2021	Donkeyhead	Parm	

=== Television ===
Year	Title	Role	Notes
2004	Sue Thomas: F.B.Eye	Iyman Kahlil	Episode: "The Lawyer"
2004	Rosemary & Thyme	Izzy	Episode: "Orpheus in the Undergrowth"
2004	Romeo!	Neil	Episode: "Tag Along"
2005–2006	Godiva's	Ramir	Main role
2006	The Dead Zone	Security guard	Episode: "The Inside Man"
2007	Falcon Beach	Nathan Rai	Recurring role (12 episodes)
2007	Painkiller Jane	Dr. Seth Carpenter	Main role
2008	Fear Itself	John Amir	Episode: "Family Man"
2008–2009	Little Mosque on the Prairie	Junaid "J.J." Jaffer	Recurring role (17 episodes)
2009	Smallville	Randall Brady	Recurring role (5 episodes)
2010	Concret Canyons	Stephen	Television film
2010	Always a Bridesmaid	Mark	Episode: "Two to Tango"
2011	And Baby Will Fall	Theo	Television film
2011	Taken from Me: The Tiffany Rubin Story	Leone	Television film
2011	Chaos	Rostam	Episode: "Mincemeat"
2011	Fringe	Agent Frazier	Episode: "Neither Here Nor There"
2012–2014	Arctic Air	Dev Panwar	Main role
2012–2015	Continuum	Matthew Kellog	Main role
2015	Motive	Isaac Griffin	Episode: "Oblivion"
2016	The X-Files	Man in Suit	Episode: "Babylon"
2016–2017	Supernatural	Rick Sanchez	2 episodes
2017	Beyond	Anil	2 episodes
2017	Sunnyhearts Community Centre	Rod	TV miniseries (Episode: "Zumba Part 2")
2017	Zoo	Myers	2 episodes
2017–2018	Travelers	Wakefield	4 episodes
2018	The Good Doctor	Dr. Arjun Dhilon	Episode: "Pain"
2018	Colony	Roy Morrow	4 episodes
2018	Take Two	Trevor Stark	Episode: "About Last Night"
2019	The InBetween	Louis Kelly	Episode: "Kiss Them for Me"
2019	Write Before Christmas	Primo	Television film
2019	The Flash	Jim Corrigan / Spectre	Crisis on Infinite Earths Part 3
2020	Arrow	Jim Corrigan / Spectre	Crisis on Infinite Earths Part 4
2020–2022	Snowpiercer	Matt Colvin	7 episodes
2021	Nancy Drew	Bertram Bobbsey	Episode: "The Demon of Piper Beach"
2024	Allegiance	Ajeet Sohal	Series regular

== Awards and nominations ==
Year	Awards	Category	Work	Result	Refs
2006	Leo Awards	Best Lead Performance by a Male in a Dramatic Series	Godiva's	Won	
2012	Leo Awards	Best Supporting Performance by a Male in a Dramatic Series	Arctic Air	Nominated	
2012	Leo Awards	Best Supporting Performance by a Male in a Feature Length Drama	Hamlet	Nominated	
2022	Leo Awards	Best Guest Performance by a Male in a Dramatic Series	Van Helsing	Nominated	
2022	Leo Awards	Best Lead Performance by a Male in a Motion Picture	Donkeyhead	Won	
2023	Leo Awards	Best Guest Performance by a Male in a Dramatic Series	Alert: Missing Persons Unit	Won	
