= Continuum (TV series) =

Canadian science fiction television series (2012–2015)

- Genre: Drama; Action; Science fiction
- Created by: Simon Barry
- Starring: Rachel Nichols; Victor Webster; Erik Knudsen; Stephen Lobo; Roger Cross; Lexa Doig; Tony Amendola; Omari Newton; Luvia Petersen; Jennifer Spence; Brian Markinson; Ryan Robbins
- Music by: Jeff Danna
- Country of origin: Canada
- Original language: English
- No. of seasons: 4
- No. of episodes: 42 (list of episodes)

Production
- Executive producers: Simon Barry; Sara B. Cooper
- Production locations: Vancouver, British Columbia, Canada/Riverview Hospital, Coquitlam, British Columbia, Canada
- Cinematography: Joel Ransom
- Running time: 44 minutes
- Production companies: Reunion Pictures; Thunderbird Reunion Pictures; Boy Meets Girl Film Company; Shaw Media; GK-tv

Original release
- Network: Showcase
- Release: May 27, 2012 – October 9, 2015

Continuum is a Canadian science fiction television series created by Simon Barry that premiered on Showcase on May 27, 2012, and ran for four seasons. It was produced by Reunion Pictures, Boy Meets Girl Film Company, and Shaw Media. The plot is about the conflict between a group of terrorists from the year 2077 who time travel to Vancouver, British Columbia, in 2012 and a police officer who unintentionally accompanies them. In spite of being many years early, the terrorist group decides to continue its violent campaign to stop corporations of the future from replacing governments, while the police officer endeavours to stop them without revealing to everyone that she and the terrorists are from the future.

== Premise ==
City Protective Services (CPS) law enforcement officer Kiera Cameron (portrayed by Rachel Nichols) lives with her husband and son in 2077-era Vancouver under the corporatocratic and oligarchic dystopia of the North American Union and its Corporate Congress, a technologically advanced high-surveillance police state. When a group of freedom fighters known as Liber8 escape execution by fleeing to the year 2012, Kiera is involuntarily transported with them. Joining with Detective Carlos Fonnegra of the Vancouver Police Department and enlisting the help of teen computer genius—and future corporate oligarch—Alec Sadler, Kiera works to track down and thwart Edouard Kagame and his followers in the present day while concealing her identity as a time-traveler from the future and tries to find a way to return home to her family.

== Prelude ==
Episodes from the first and second seasons begin with the plot of the show narrated via a voice-over from the point of view of Kiera Cameron.

2077. My time, my city, my family. When terrorists killed thousands of innocents, they were condemned to die. They had other plans. A time travel device sent us all back sixty-five years. I want to get home, but I can't be sure what I will return to if history is changed. Their plan: to corrupt and control the present in order to win the future. What they didn't plan on was me.

Starting with the third season, the narration was replaced by a new sequence that contains a computer-animated version of the time travel device, scenes from previous seasons, and cast credits before ending with Kiera Cameron holding the device, followed by the title card.

== Cast and characters ==
=== Main ===
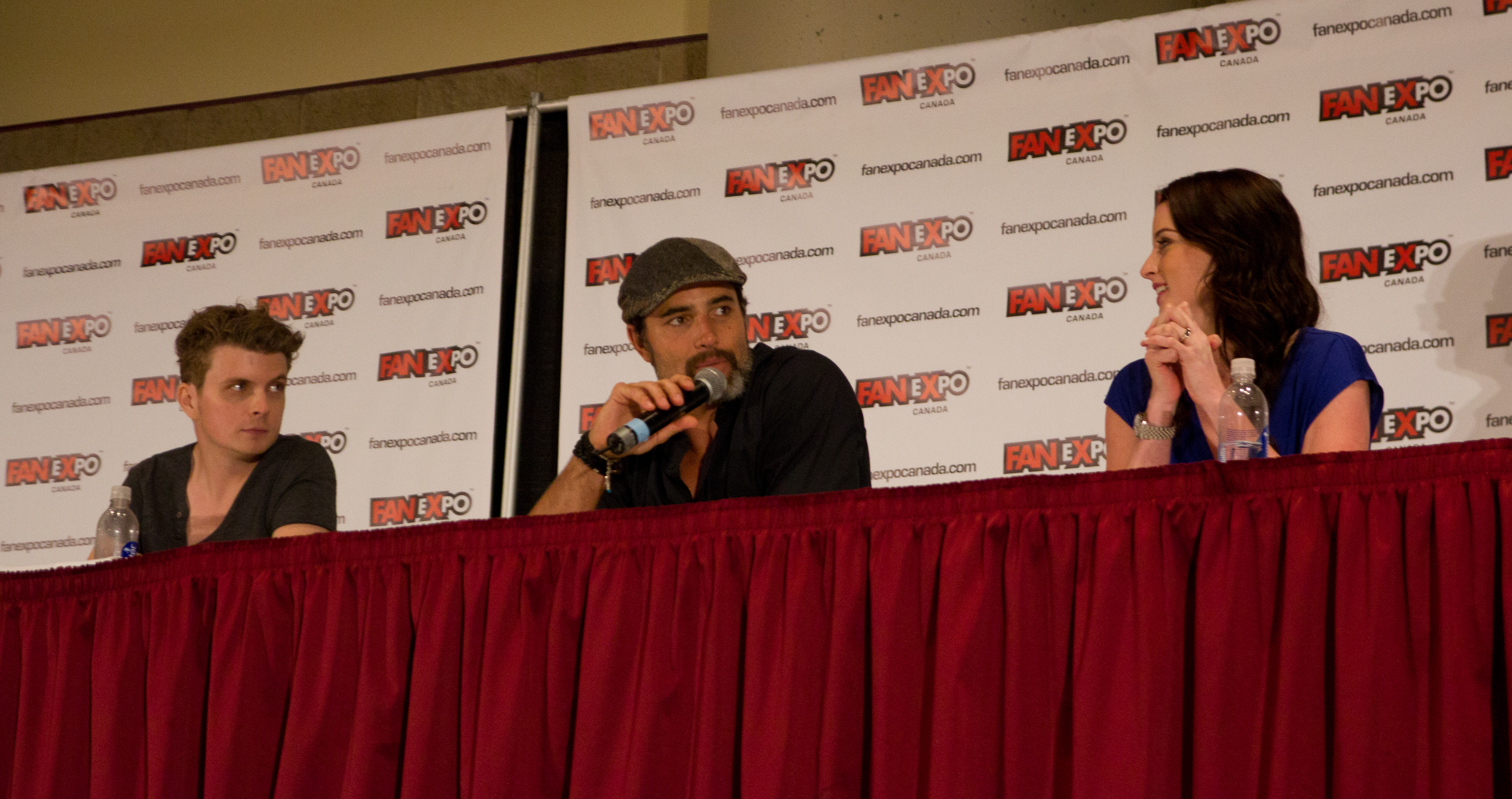
The main cast of the show at Fan Expo Canada 2012. From left: Erik Knudsen, Victor Webster and Rachel Nichols

- Rachel Nichols as City Protective Services (CPS) "Protector" Kiera Cameron, a law enforcement agent from 2077-era Vancouver who was sent back into the past with the members of Liber8 during their escape attempt at their execution. Cut off from her time period, she joins the Vancouver Police Department to pursue Liber8 and thwart their plans to alter the time line using her new position in the police department and the technology that she brought with her.
- Victor Webster as Vancouver Police Department (VPD) Detective Carlos Fonnegra, Kiera's partner with the present-day police.
- Erik Knudsen as the young Alec Sadler. As a teenager, before he went on to create SadTech, Alec is reclusive and prefers to spend time in his computer lab; there, he is able to communicate with Kiera through her cybernetic implants, which he discovers to be based on his own inventions.
- Stephen Lobo as Matthew Kellog, a former member of Liber8.
- Roger Cross as Travis Verta, a member of Liber8 and supersoldier, Kagame's right-hand man, and lover of Sonya Valentine.
- Lexa Doig as Sonya Valentine, a member of Liber8 and Travis Verta's lover, who is designated by Kagame as his official successor and leader after his death.
- Tony Amendola as Edouard Kagame, the leader and spokesman of Liber8.
- Omari Newton as Lucas Ingram, a member of Liber8 and former SadTech engineer who was forced to defect to Liber8's cause. He is not a soldier, but his technical skills remain crucial to his colleagues in Liber8.
- Luvia Petersen as Jasmine Garza, a soldier and member of Liber8. Garza is physically strong, agile, and lethal; but she has been damaged mentally by corporate imprisonment.
- Jennifer Spence as Betty Robertson, a colleague of Detective Fonnegra, who generally handles the computer side of their cases.
- Brian Markinson as Vancouver Police Department Inspector Jack Dillon, Carlos and Betty's superior officer; he respects Kiera's insights despite the mysteries of her past.
- Ryan Robbins as Brad Tonkin, a time traveler from an alternate time-line in 2039 in which the Corporate Congress does not exist.

=== Recurring ===
- Richard Harmon as Julian Randol, Alec's stepbrother in 2012. Later in his life, he will be known as Theseus, the founder of Liber8 and mentor to Edouard Kagame.
  - Gerry Nairn portrays the elderly Theseus in 2077.
- Terry Chen as Curtis Chen, a follower of the traveller and former member of Liber8.
- Magda Apanowicz as Emily/Maya Hartwell, Alec's girlfriend.
- Ian Tracey as Jason Sadler, an alleged former employee of the same prison where Liber8 escaped from, thrown back in time to 1992 rather than 2012.
- William B. Davis as the elderly Alec Sadler in 2077. In the future, Alec founded SadTech in the later twenty-first century.
- Nicholas Lea as Canadian Security Intelligence Service (CSIS) Agent Gardiner.
- Hugh Dillon as Mr Escher/Marc Sadler, ex-Freelancer, CEO, and chairman of Piron, Alec's father, and a shadowy figure with powerful connections, who appears to know something about Liber8 and Kiera's true origin.
- Mike Dopud as Stefan Jaworski, a member of Liber8.
- Tahmoh Penikett as Jim Martin, politician and Carlos' friend.
- John Reardon as Greg Cameron, Kiera's husband. He is a SadTech project leader, and Alec Sadler is his boss. He is primarily seen in Kiera's flashbacks to her life in 2077.
- Sean Michael Kyer as Sam Cameron, Kiera's young son.
- Michael Rogers as Roland Randol, Julian's father and Alec's stepfather.
- Janet Kidder as Ann Sadler, Alec's mother and Julian's stepmother.
- Adrian Holmes as Warren, one of the Freelancers.
- Zak Santiago as Miller, one of the Freelancers.
- Rachael Crawford as Catherine, the leader of the Freelancers.
- Caitlin Cromwell as Elena, Kiera's "Protector" partner in 2077.

== Episodes ==
Season	Episodes	Originally released	
Season	Episodes	First released	Last released
1	10	May 27, 2012	August 5, 2012
2	13	April 21, 2013	August 4, 2013
3	13	March 16, 2014	June 22, 2014
4	6	September 4, 2015	October 9, 2015

The first season has 10 episodes. On August 25, 2012, Showcase renewed Continuum for a second season of 13 episodes, which premiered on April 21, 2013, on Showcase in Canada, May 23, 2013, on Syfy in the UK, and June 7, 2013, on Syfy in the US. On June 5, 2013, Continuum was officially renewed for a third season, which premiered on March 16, 2014, on Showcase in Canada and April 4, 2014, on Syfy in the US.

During an interview in May 2014, Simon Barry revealed that he had seven to ten seasons in mind for Continuum. Showcase announced on December 8, 2014, that Continuum had been renewed for a fourth and final season of six episodes, which began airing on September 4, 2015, on Showcase in Canada, and September 11, 2015, on Syfy in the US. The series concluded, with a complete and final outcome to the storyline, on October 9, 2015.

== Production ==
=== Development ===
Series creator Simon Barry explains how the show was picked up by Showcase:

I had developed the idea for US networks (where I had been selling for several years, but not getting picked up) and before I got a chance to take Continuum out and pitch it, I was hired by CBS to write a different pilot. In the middle of that job, my director friend Pat Williams took a meeting at Showcase Network in Canada and called me in a panic because he didn't have anything to pitch. I gave him the idea for Continuum to pass on to the executives there. They immediately saw the potential and hired me to write a pilot script. Because it was first set up with Showcase, there was much more of an appetite for Sci-Fi and genre bending concepts. Showcase really understood what the show could be from day one.

== Broadcast ==
The series premiered in Canada on May 27, 2012, with Season 1 consisting of ten episodes; and concluded on October 9, 2015, after forty-two episodes.

In French Canada, it debuted on addikTV on November 6, 2013.

It premiered in the UK on September 27, 2012, on Syfy (UK), with season 2 returning on May 23, 2013, and season 3 on January 28, 2015.

The series premiered in the U.S. on January 14, 2013, on Syfy, with season 2 premiering on June 7, 2013, season 3 on April 4, 2014 and season 4 on September 11, 2015.

The series premiered in Australia on SF on February 21, 2013, and returned for season 2 on October 3, 2013. Season 3 premiered on Syfy (Australia) (the replacement to the now defunct SF) on May 5, 2014.

== Cancellation ==
The show was cancelled mid-story, but was allowed to make a further six episodes in a fourth season to come to a conclusion. Because of the reduced number of episodes, the final season focused primarily on Kiera, Alec, Carlos and Kellog. Emily, Julian and the Traveler were originally all supposed to get larger stories, but their threads had to be dropped. The Traveler, who had a build-up in season three, was meant to be used as a way to branch out and expand the show's mythology by exploring his background in detail and how he was connected to everything. There were also talks about doing an entire season about the members of Liber8 and their individual backstories.

Simon Barry has expressed interest in continuing the Continuum universe and mythology in other mediums if possible, as there were "some great ideas that never made it to the screen" due to the cancellation; for instance, he would love to follow Kellog's story after the final episode as a book or graphic novel. He also says he would love to see fans exploring the universe and characters in the form of fan fiction.

== Reception ==
=== Critical response ===
The review aggregator website Rotten Tomatoes reports an 86% approval rating for the first season, with an average rating of 7.2/10 based on 14 reviews. The website's consensus reads "Continuum blends time-tested genre ingredients to deliver a sci-fi crime drama that's solidly entertaining despite its overall familiarity." Reviewer Neil Genzlinger of The New York Times described the series as "slick" and highlighted its attention to detail. Reviewer David Hinckley of the New York Daily News compared Continuum positively to Life on Mars, another series with a time travelling police officer, and gave the show three stars out of five. According to Hinckley, the series has potential to do well, and if it "doesn't aim to soar, it executes the basics well".

Rotten Tomatoes gave an 80% approval rating for the second season, with an average rating of 6.1/10 based on 5 reviews, a 100% approval rating for the third season, with an average rating of 8.4/10 based on 7 reviews, and an 88% approval rating for the fourth season, with an average rating of 8.0/10 based on 8 reviews,

=== Awards ===
On January 15, 2013, the day after the U.S. launch, the Canadian Screen Awards nominated Continuum for five Screenies: Best Drama Series, Writing, Direction, Music and Visual Effects. It won in the latter category. The show received a record 16 Leo Award nominations.

Year	Award	Category	Recipients	Outcome
2013	Leo Awards	Best Dramatic Series	Continuum	Won
2013	Leo Awards	Best Direction	William Waring, "Family Time"	Won
2013	Leo Awards	Best Direction	Patrick Williams, "Endtimes"	Nominated
2013	Leo Awards	Best Screenwriting	Simon Barry, "Endtimes"	Won
2013	Leo Awards	Best Cinematography	David Pelletier, "Endtimes"	Nominated
2013	Leo Awards	Best Editing	Allison Grace, "Family Time"	Won
2013	Leo Awards	Best Editing	Allan Lee, "Endtimes"	Nominated
2013	Leo Awards	Best Production Design	Chris August, "Endtimes"	Nominated
2013	Leo Awards	Best Costume Design	Maya Mani, "A Stitch in Time"	Won
2013	Leo Awards	Best Stunt Coordination	Kimani Ray Smith, "Wasting Time"	Nominated
2013	Leo Awards	Best Male Guest Performance	Jesse Moss, "Matter of Time"	Nominated
2013	Leo Awards	Best Male Guest Performance	Ian Tracey, "Endtimes"	Won
2013	Leo Awards	Best Supporting Actor	Richard Harmon, "Family Time"	Won
2013	Leo Awards	Best Supporting Actor	Brian Markinson, "Endtimes"	Nominated
2013	Leo Awards	Best Supporting Actress	Jennifer Spence, "Playtime"	Nominated
2013	Leo Awards	Best Supporting Actress	Lexa Doig, "Endtimes"	Nominated
2013	Constellation Awards	Best Sci-Fi TV Series	Continuum	Won
2013	Constellation Awards	Best Sci-Fi Film or TV Script	Continuum	Won
2013	Constellation Awards	Best Female Performance in a Sci-Fi TV Episode	Rachel Nichols	Won
2013	Constellation Awards	Outstanding Canadian Contribution to Sci-TV Film or TV	Continuum	Nominated
2013	Saturn Awards (39th)	Best Television Presentation	Continuum	Nominated
2013	Writers Guild of Canada	Drama Series	Simon Barry, "Second Time"	Nominated
2014	Leo Awards	Best Picture Editing in a Dramatic Series	Jamie Alain	Won
2014	Leo Awards	Best Dramatic Series	Continuum	Won
2014	Leo Awards	Best Screenwriting	Simon Barry	Won
2014	Leo Awards	Best Cinematography	Michael Wale	Won
2014	Leo Awards	Best Make-Up in a Dramatic Series	Jennifer Kipps	Won
2014	Leo Awards	Best Stunt Coordination in a Dramatic Series	Kimani Ray Smith	Won
2014	Leo Awards	Best Supporting Performance by a Female in a Dramatic Series	Lexa Doig, "Split Second"	Won
2014	Leo Awards	Best Direction in a Dramatic Series	William Waring	Nominated
2014	Leo Awards	Best Supporting Performance by a Male in a Dramatic Series	Roger R. Cross	Nominated
2014	Leo Awards	Best Supporting Performance by a Female in a Dramatic Series	Jennifer Spence, "Second Opinion".	Nominated
2014	Canadian Screen Awards	Supporting Actress	Luvia Petersen	Nominated
2014	Canadian Screen Awards	Visual Effects	Continuum	Won
2014	Saturn Awards (40th)	Best Syndicated/Cable Television Series	Continuum	Nominated
2014	Saturn Awards (40th)	Best Television Actress	Rachel Nichols	Nominated
2014	Saturn Awards (40th)	Best Television Supporting Actor	Erik Knudsen	Nominated
2015	Saturn Awards (41st)	Best Syndicated/Cable Television Series	Continuum	Nominated
2015	Saturn Awards (41st)	Best Television Actress	Rachel Nichols	Nominated
2015	Saturn Awards (41st)	Best Television Supporting Actor	Erik Knudsen	Nominated
2015	Saturn Awards (41st)	Best Television Supporting Actress	Lexa Doig	Nominated
2016	Prix Aurora Awards	Best Visual Presentation	Continuum	Nominated
2016	Saturn Awards (42nd)	Best Science Fiction Television Series	Continuum	Won
2016	Saturn Awards (42nd)	Best Television Actress	Rachel Nichols	Nominated
2016	Saturn Awards (42nd)	Best Television Supporting Actor	Erik Knudsen	Nominated

== Other media ==
Zeros 2 Heroes Media Inc. has created an alternate reality game website, Continuum the Game.

The game site also includes a "Comics" section, featuring Continuum: The War Files, which is an eight-part graphic novel that tells of the war going on in 2065 between the Corporations and Liber8. The comic was available only in Canada.

Rittenhouse released a trading card set based on the show in June 2014.
