= Sarah-Jane Redmond =

Canadian actress and acting coach

- Occupation: Actress
- Years active: 1988–present
- Children: 1

Sarah-Jane Redmond is a British actress and acting coach, living in Canada, whose work has spanned film, television and theatre productions, often in science fiction roles. She has taught acting at the New Image College of Fine Arts in British Columbia and directed theatre performances there. Some of her roles have been in collaboration with screenwriter Chris Carter, who cast her in several of his television series. She is best known as Lucy Butler on Millennium (1997-1999).

== Early life ==
Redmond was born in Cyprus, where her father was stationed during his career with the Royal Air Force. Her family moved to the Lake District in the United Kingdom, before emigrating to Canada when she was ten. She studied acting in Canada and the United Kingdom before founding an amateur theatre company, Holy Barbarians, to pursue stage work. Part of her study was at the acting school of Canadian actor William B. Davis. During that time, she also worked as a dancer in Toronto.

== Career ==
Redmond's first television role was in an episode of The X-Files; this introduced her to director David Nutter and writer Chris Carter, who later gave her a recurring role in the series Millennium, and a part in the 2008 film The X-Files: I Want to Believe. Her other television roles have been in the science-fiction shows Harsh Realm, Andromeda, Dark Angel, The Outer Limits and Smallville.

Redmond's feature film appearances include 2002's Hellraiser: Hellseeker; she auditioned for this role using bondage artwork by Eric Stanton instead of a standard actor's headshot. Her other film roles include The Sisterhood of the Traveling Pants, Case 39, The Invitation, and The Entrance. The latter earned Redmond a Leo Award nomination in 2007 for Best Lead Performance by a Female in a Feature Length Drama.

Redmond also taught acting at the New Image College of Fine Arts in Vancouver, British Columbia. During her time with the faculty, she directed the college's 2011 production of the Stephen Adly Guirgis play The Last Days of Judas Iscariot, alongside fellow actor Frank Cassini.

== Personal life ==
Redmond is a boxing and martial arts enthusiast, and has participated in charity walks for the British Columbia Cancer Foundation. She has a son, Lucas Noon-Redmond, who was born in October 2007.

== Filmography ==
=== Film ===
Year	Title	Role	Notes
1993	From Pig to Oblivion		Short
1998	Disturbing Behavior	Miss Perkins	
1999	Babette's Feet	Babette	Short
2000	Suspicious River	Bonnie	
2001	Camouflage	Darlene Tutt	
2001	See Spot Run	Agent Sharp	
2002	Liebe auf den 2. Blick	Rachel	Video
2002	Hellraiser: Hellseeker	Gwen Stevens	Video
2003	The Invitation	Maria Gellman	
2003	Arbor Vitae	Nurse	Short
2004	Packing Up	Sarah	Short
2005	The Sisterhood of the Traveling Pants	Tibby's Mother	
2006	The Entrance	Det. Porhowski	
2007	BloodRayne 2: Deliverance	Martha	Video
2007	Taming Tammy	Tammy	
2008	The X-Files: I Want to Believe	Special Agent in Charge	
2009	Case 39	Barron's Wife	
2010	30 Days of Night: Dark Days	Regan	Video
2010	Triple Dog	Valerie	
2013	True Love Waits	Judy	Short
2014	Down Here	Claire	
2016	The 9th Life of Louis Drax	Helen	
2016	Dark Harvest	Mrs. Grant	
2017	Cold Zone	Nurse Lettie	
2024	Bad Genius	Irene Walsh	
2024	A Reason for the Season	Elizabeth Lane	

=== Television ===
Year	Title	Role	Notes
1997	Sleepwalkers	Carla Gilpin	"Night Terrors"
1997–1999	Millennium	Lucy Butler	Recurring role
1998	The X-Files	Karin Matthews	"Schizogeny"
1998	Cold Squad	Laura	"Stanley Caron"
1998–1999	Da Vinci's Inquest	Gloria	"Little Sister: Parts 2 & 3", "Final Chapter"
1999	Strange World	Cynthia Ballard	"Pilot"
1999	The Outer Limits	Kelly Risely	"The Inheritors"
1999–2000	Nothing Too Good for a Cowboy	Olivia Mowat	Recurring role
1999–2000	Harsh Realm	Inga Fossa	Recurring role
1999–2005	Da Vinci's Inquest	Sgt. Sheila Kurtz	Main (seasons 2–7), recurring (season 8)
2000	Call of the Wild	Molly Brown	"Molly Brown"
2000	Dark Angel	Lauren Braganza	"Pilot"
2001–2002, 2007	Smallville	Nell Potter	Recurring role
2002	Dead in a Heartbeat	Jessica Sara	TV film
2002	Breaking News	Claire	"Victims"
2002	Taken	Louise Rankin	"Acid Tests"
2003	A Wrinkle in Time	Dr. Dana Murry	TV film
2003	Andromeda	Jane Rollins	"Twilight of the Idols", "Shadows Cast by a Final Salute"
2003–2004	Alienated	Sarah Blundell	Main role
2004	Karroll's Christmas	Patricia Rosecog Montgomery	TV film
2005	The Collector	Judy	"The Comic"
2005–2006	Da Vinci's City Hall	Sgt. Sheila Kurtz	Recurring role
2005	Chasing Christmas	Alison	TV film
2006	The Accidental Witness	Mary Lane Ferris	TV film
2006	Godiva's	Eve	"Inked"
2006	The Dead Zone	Jessica Simon	"Revelations"
2006	Alice, I Think	Sarah	"Smitten in Smithers"
2006	Firestorm: Last Stand at Yellowstone	Valerie Danville	TV film
2006–2007	The L Word	Carla McCutcheon	"Left Hand of the Goddess", "Legend in the Making"
2006–2007	Kyle XY	Rebecca Thatcher	"Overheard", "Endgame", "The Prophet"
2007	Falcon Beach	Renee Foster	"Tidal"
2007	Anna's Storm	Dr. Julie O'Ryan	TV film
2009	Sorority Wars	Dana	Television film
2009	The Building	Christina	TV film
2009	The Guard	Gayle	"Full Circle"
2009	Harper's Island	Sarah Mills	"Thrack, Splat, Sizzle", "Sigh"
2009	Supernatural	Kathy Randolph	"Changing Channels"
2010	V	Susan Thompson	"Heretic's Fork"
2010	Lies Between Friends	Laura Holmes	TV film
2010	Growing the Big One	Kate Rinaldi-Rogers	TV film
2010	Life Unexpected	Valerie	"Team Rebounded", "Homecoming Crashed", "Stand Taken"
2010	True Justice	Crystal	"Deadly Crossing: Part 1"
2011	Fringe	Ashley	"Subject 13"
2011	The Haunting Hour: The Series	Janet	"Catching Cold"
2011	Finding a Family	Suzanne Bante	TV film
2011	Possessing Piper Rose	Lydia Newman	TV film
2012	Duke	Janice Evans	TV film
2012	Arrow	Mrs. Reston	"Legacies"
2013	Arctic Air	Bev Dearman	"Bombs Away"
2013	Motive	Nancy Stanwyck	"Undertow"
2013	The Carpenter's Miracle	Delia Tynan	TV film
2013	Cult	Charlotte	"The Devil You Know"
2013	King & Maxwell	Donna Murray	"Stealing Secrets"
2013	Once Upon a Time in Wonderland	Anastasia's mother	"Heart of Stone"
2014	Almost Human	Dr. Friedman	"You Are Here"
2014	Psych	Rosie Polk	"Someone's Got a Woody"
2014	Mr. Miracle	Sharon	TV film
2015	A Gift of Miracles	Kathy	TV film
2015	iZombie	Jackie	"Brother, Can You Spare a Brain?", "Liv and Let Clive", "Virtual Reality Bites"
2015	Unreal	Kelly Mackey	"Wife"
2015	Buried Secrets	Mayor Patricia Harding	TV film
2015	Sorority Murder	Melissa Taylor	Television film
2015	Cedar Cove	Corrie Mcaffee	Recurring role
2015	Supernatural	Lily Markham	"Baby"
2016	Center Stage: On Pointe	Lorenza	TV film
2016	The Irresistible Blueberry Farm	Bliss	TV film
2017	Garage Sale Mystery: A Case of Murder	Mae Vedders	TV film
2018	The Good Doctor	Emma Newton	TV series; Guest role, 1 episode
2018–2020	Siren	Elaine Pownall	Recurring role
2019	Chilling Adventures of Sabrina	Mrs. Kemper	TV series;Recurring role, 4 episodes
2019	The 100	Kaylee Lee VII	TV series; recurring, 5 episodes
2024	The Irrational	Joy Laslen	"Bad Blood"
