= Elise Gatien =

Canadian actress (born 1988)

- Born: July 14, 1988 (age 38); Kamloops, British Columbia, Canada
- Occupation: Actress
- Years active: 2006–present
- Spouse: Stu Stuverson (m. 2020)
- Children: 1

External image
- Gatien in 2014

Elise Gatien (born July 14, 1988) is a Canadian actress. She is known for her role as Candice "CJ" Ward in the Cartoon Network live-action series Tower Prep.

== Life and career ==
Gatien was born in Kamloops, British Columbia, Canada. She is of half German descent on her dad's side. She began performing at the age of four. She trained for a number of years in dance and musical theater. She was discovered at a model/talent convention and had a number of opportunities in Asia.

In 2009, Gatien played Mia Dearden in two episodes of Smallville. Her other television credits include Supernatural, Bionic Woman, Eureka, The Guard, and roles in the films In the Land of Women and Dr. Dolittle: Tail to the Chief.

In 2010, Gatien was cast as CJ Ward in the Cartoon Network live-action series Tower Prep. She was cast in The CW's 2012 pilot The Selection based on books written by Kiera Cass; however, the pilot was not picked up to series. In 2015, Gatien played the starring role of Jamie in the 1980s horror homage film Lost After Dark.

== Filmography ==
=== Film ===
Year	Title	Role	Notes
2007	In the Land of Women	Tiffany	
2008	Dr. Dolittle: Tail to the Chief	Courtney Sterling	Video
2012	Diary of a Wimpy Kid: Dog Days	Madison	
2014	Deeper: The Retribution of Beth	Sam	
2015	Lost After Dark	Jamie	
2015	Fifty Shades of Grey	Girl in Line	

=== Television ===
Year	Title	Role	Notes
2006	The Obsession	Erika Matthews	TV film
2007	Eureka	Megan	Episode: "Duck, Duck Goose"
2007	Bionic Woman	Anne Corvus	Episode: "Sisterhood"
2009	The Guard	Megan	Episode: "Out of the Woods"
2009–2010	Smallville	Mia Dearden/Speedy	Episodes: "Crossfire", "Disciple"
2010	Supernatural	Kristen	Episode: "Live Free or Twihard"
2010	Tower Prep	Candace "CJ" Ward	Main role
2011	The Haunting Hour: The Series	Stella	Episode: "The Red Dress"
2011	Level Up	Heather	TV film
2012	The Secret Circle	Elizabeth Meade	Episode: "Prom"
2012	The Selection	May	Unsold TV pilot
2013	Restless Virgins	Heather	TV film
2014	Spooksville	Kelsey	Episode: "Shell Shock"
2014	The Tomorrow People	Sophie Coburn	Episode: "Endgame"
2015	iZombie	Corinne	Episodes: "The Exterminator", "Liv and Let Clive", "Dead Air"
2015	Unreal	Rita	Episodes: "Return", "Relapse"
2015	Perfect Match	Lucy	TV film
2015	Sorority Murder	Natalie Swanson	Television film
2015	Christmas Truce	Lilly	TV film
2016	Motive	Paige Lytton	Episode: "Foreign Relations"
2016	Love on the Sidelines	Ava Holland	TV film
2017	Ghost Wars	Maggie Rennie	Recurring role
2017	Moonlight in Vermont	Haley	TV film
2018	Secret Millionaire	Candice	TV film
2018	Supernatural	Jennie Plum	Episode: "Various & Sundry Villains"
2019	The Murders	Daria Nichols	
2021	Love & Where to Find It	Lena	TV film
2022	The Engagement Backup	Luna	TV film
2023–present	Virgin River	Lark	Recurring role
