= Damon Vignale =

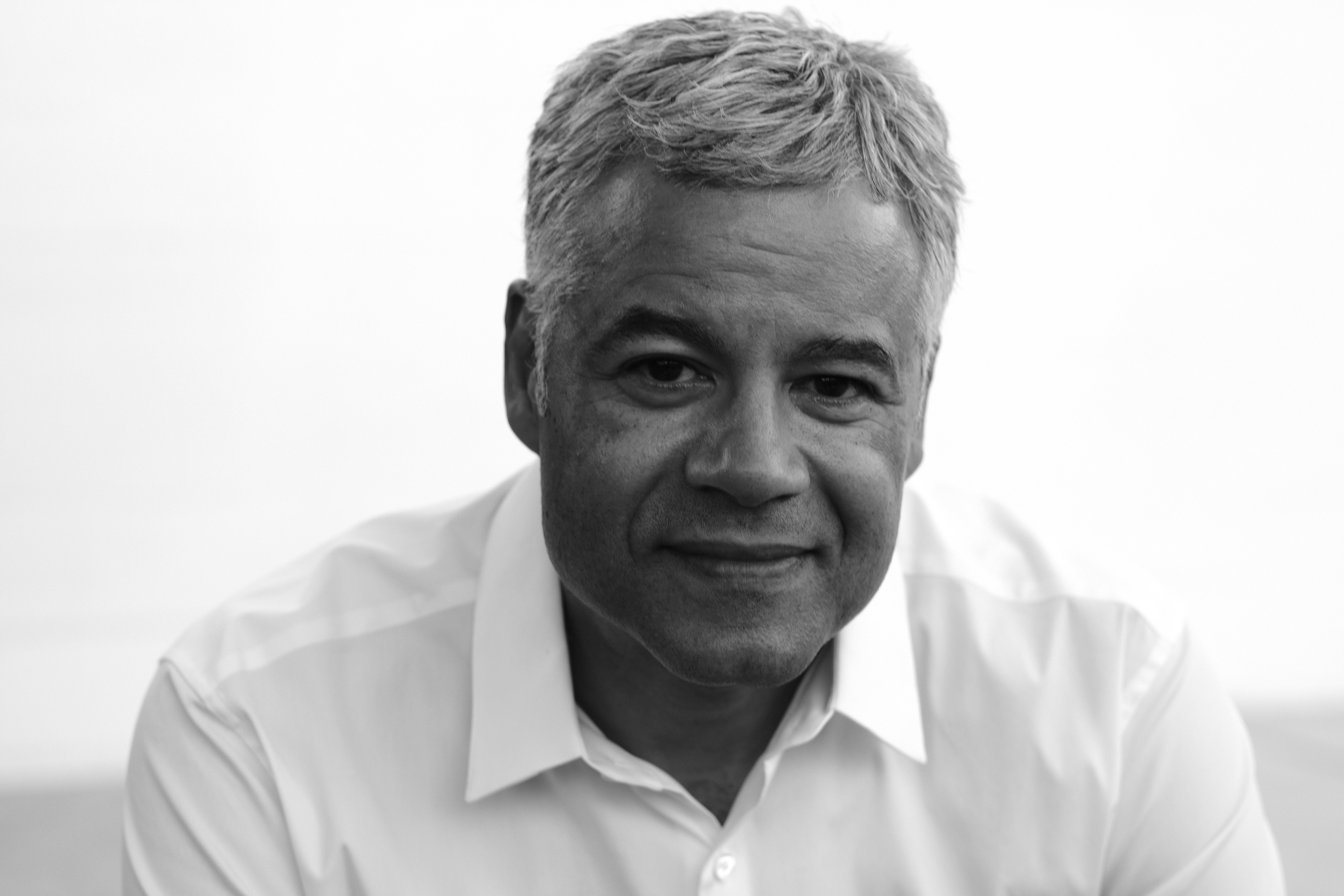
- Vignale in 2018
- Occupations: Film and Television Writer, Director, Producer
- Years active: 1993–present

Damon Vignale is a Canadian director, writer and producer working in film and television. Vignale has directed the films Little Brother of War and The Entrance. He released the web series The Vetala in 2009, drawn from the Baital Pachisi, a collection of Sanskrit tales and legends, and received a 2010 Gemini Award. Vignale's debut documentary film The Exhibition world premiered in the Next Program of the 2013 Hot Docs International Film Festival. The film won the 2014 International Emmy Award for Arts Programming, and was a Special Award recipient of the 2015 Canadian Screen Awards. Vignale's television credits as a writer-producer include ABC/CTV's homicide series Motive, Bravo's police drama 19-2, and the ITV/BritBox series The Bletchley Circle: San Francisco. He is currently a writer and co-executive producer on the CBC drama series Allegiance, and sits on the board of the Pacific Screenwriting Program.

Vignale was creator and showrunner of the original crime-drama series The Murders for City TV. The series starred Jessica Lucas as a rookie homicide detective whose negligence in a fellow officer’s death has her searching for redemption in her investigations. Rogers Media announced production commencing October 9, 2018 The series premiered in Canada and Europe in 2019. Sundance Now released the series in the US in 2021.

== Filmography ==
Year	Show	Credit
2026	Allegiance (TV)	Writer, Co-Executive Producer
2024, 2025	Sight Unseen (TV)	Writer, Co-Executive Producer
2023, 2025	SkyMed (TV)	Writer, Director, Co-Executive Producer
2021, 2026	Family Law (TV)	Writer, Director, Consulting Producer
2019	The Murders (TV)	Writer, Executive Producer
2018	The Bletchley Circle: San Francisco (TV)	Writer, Consulting Producer
2017	Ghost Wars (TV)	Writer, Co-Executive Producer
2015, 2016	Motive (TV)	Writer, Consulting Producer
2014, 2015	19-2 (TV)	Writer, Consulting Producer
2011 - 2015	Blackstone (TV)	Writer, Producer
2013	The Exhibition (Film)	Producer, Director
2010	Mixed Blessings (TV)	Writer
2009	The Vetala (Web series)	Writer, Producer, Director
2006	The Entrance (Film)	Writer, Producer, Director
2005	A Perfect Note (TV movie)	Director
2003	Little Brother of War (Film)	Writer, Producer, Director
1998	Zacharia Farted (Film)	Producer

== Awards ==
- 2015 Academy of Canadian Cinema and Television Diversity Award
- 2014 International Emmy Award
- 2014 Leo Award - Best Direction in a Documentary
- 2014 Leo Award - Best Editing in a Documentary
- 2014 The PBS Michael Sullivan FRONTLINE Award for Journalism in a Documentary
- 2012 Leo Award - Best Dramatic Series
- 2011 Leo Award - Best Screenwriting in a Dramatic Series
- 2010 Gemini Award - Best Original Program/Digital Media Fiction
- 2010 Leo Award - Best Web Series
- 2010 Webby Award Honoree - Drama
- 2010 Silver Telly Award
- 2006 Best Director - Eerie Horror Fest
- 2004 Audience Award - Toronto Reelworld Film Festival

== Nominations ==
- 2019 Leo Award - Best Screenwriting in a Dramatic Series
- 2016 Canadian Screen Award - Best Drama Series
- 2016 Leo Award - Best Drama Series
- 2016 Leo Award - Best Screenwriting in a Dramatic Series
- 2015 Canadian Screen Award - Best Direction in a Documentary
- 2015 Leo Award - Best Drama Series
- 2015 Leo Award - Best Screenwriting in a Dramatic Series
- 2014 Canadian Screen Award - Best Drama Series
- 2014 Canadian Screen Award - Best Writing in a Dramatic Series
- 2014 Leo Award - Best Feature Length Documentary
- 2014 Leo Award - Best Drama Series
- 2013 Hugo Award - Chicago Int'l Film Festival
- 2012 Leo Award - Best Screenwriting in a Dramatic Series
- 2011 Seoul Int'l Drama Awards - Best Screenwriting
- 2011 Leo Award - Best Drama Series
- 2011 Leo Award - Best Screenwriting in a Drama Series
- 1999 Leo Award - Best Feature Length Drama
