= Pilot (V) =

- V episode
- Episode no.: Season 1 Episode 1
- Directed by: Yves Simoneau
- Story by: Scott Peters; Kenneth Johnson
- Teleplay by: Scott Peters
- Cinematography by: David Franco
- Editing by: Michael Ornstein
- Production code: 276049
- Original air date: November 3, 2009
- Running time: 47 minutes

Guest appearances
- Alan Tudyk as Dale Maddox; Christopher Shyer as Marcus; David Richmond-Peck as Georgie Sutton; Jesse Wheeler as Brandon; Ray Faughner as Lex; Britt Irvin as Haley Stark; Scott Hylands as Father Travis; Stefan Arngrim as Roy

Episode chronology
← Previous —	Next → "There Is No Normal Anymore"

"Pilot" is the series premiere of the 2009 reimagining of the 1983 miniseries V created by Kenneth Johnson. The episode's teleplay was written by Scott Peters, with story credit going to Johnson and Peters. Yves Simoneau directed the episode, which originally aired in the United States on ABC on November 3, 2009. The episode sees spaceships appear over 29 of the world's major cities. Though the alien "Visitors" claim to come in peace, it transpires that they have been infiltrating the planet for decades, and are planning on enslaving the human species.

Parallels have been drawn between the Visitors and US Presidents George W. Bush and Barack Obama, though Peters and co-producer Jeffrey Bell refute that they were intentional. Bell feels that while the original series was more of a military show with a clear enemy, the reimagining focuses more on the paranoia of not knowing who can be trusted. The episode incorporates aspects of the original series, including the Visitors' giant spaceships, but is quick to reveal the Visitors' true motivations, as Peters felt awareness of the original story was already high.

The episode was watched by 14.3 million US viewers, and received generally positive reviews. USA Today's Robert Bianco praised it for "quickly establishing its own identity" independent of the original series, while E! Online named it the best pilot episode in "forever". In contrast, The New York Times's Mike Hale called the episode "slapdash and formulaic", while David Hinckley of the Daily News deemed it "an elaborately costumed popcorn flick".

== Plot ==
When spaceships appear over 29 of the world's major cities, the alien "Visitors" claim to come in peace. Their leader Anna (Morena Baccarin) offers to trade technology and cures for many diseases with mankind, in return for water and minerals. She invites TV journalist Chad Decker (Scott Wolf) to interview her, on the condition he only portray the Visitors in a positive light.

Federal Bureau of Investigation counterterrorism agent Erica Evans (Elizabeth Mitchell) disapproves that her teenage son Tyler (Logan Huffman) is so enamoured by the aliens, being recruited for the V Peace Ambassador Program by the beautiful Visitor Lisa (Laura Vandervoort). Erica and her partner Dale Maddox (Alan Tudyk) investigate a group of terrorists whose activity spiked during the Visitors' initial appearance. They discover an abandoned hideout containing explosives, fake IDs and a deceased man who was tortured prior to his death. His cellphone contains details of a sleeper cell meeting, which Erica attends.

Elsewhere, Catholic priest Jack Landry (Joel Gretsch) is suspicious of the Visitors, and warns his parishioners to be wary of them. He doubts his stance when a previously wheelchair-using parishioner is able to walk again, but has his suspicions confirmed when a mortally wounded man arrives at the church, telling Jack he knows the real reason behind the Visitors' appearance on Earth, handing him a dossier on the aliens and details of a secret meeting.

Businessman Ryan Nichols (Morris Chestnut) is contacted repeatedly throughout the day by his old acquaintance Georgie (David Richmond-Peck), but refuses to go along with what Georgie wants from him, as he is planning on asking his girlfriend Valerie (Lourdes Benedicto) to marry him. It transpires that Georgie is running the meeting which both Erica and Jack attend. He demands that all new attendants have an incision made in their skin to prove they are human, as the Visitors are actually reptiles with cloned human flesh hiding their reptilian appearance. He claims that the Visitors have been infiltrating Earth for years, and have installed agents in high positions of society with the ultimate intention of enslaving the human species. Jack shows Georgie the dossier, which contains photographs of the visitors in disguise, one of whom Erica recognizes from the fake passports seized during the earlier raid.

The group are suddenly attacked by a group of human-disguised Visitors, including Erica's partner Dale. She is able to overpower him, while Ryan arrives and defends Georgie. They escape from the building, and Ryan reveals that he is actually a Visitor, but opposes their plans. He returns home with the intention of breaking up with his girlfriend to protect her, but in his absence she has discovered the engagement ring he purchased for her. Erica and Jack discuss beginning a resistance movement against the Visitors.

== Production ==
It was announced in May 2009 that a reimagining of the 1983 miniseries V created by Kenneth Johnson, had been picked up by ABC. Cast member Mitchell noted that the show would do service to the most iconic moments from the original franchise. Executive producer Scott Peters later confirmed that the new series would incorporate memorable elements of the original, including "the huge ships [and] the red uniforms" seen in the pilot, as: "we are well aware of those moments and looking to put our own little spin on them to tip our hat to the old audience." Asked about the 1983 reveal of the Visitors' reptilian appearance beneath their human disguise, Peters noted of the reimagining: "We tried to put our own [spin on it]. We're ... a little bit different than their execution of it. It wasn't so much latex mask as it is real flesh and blood."

The Visitors' spaceship was entirely computer generated, and all scenes which took place aboard it were filmed in front of a green screen. The internal design of the Visitor ship appears to be based on Santiago Calatrava's futurist style of architecture as the hallways appear to be based on the Milwaukee Art Museum hallways and the white L'Hemisfèric building from the City of the Arts and the Sciences in Valencia can be seen in the middle of the Visitor city, both of which were designed by Calatrava. Calatrava's designs have made their way into numerous science-fiction productions such as the Star Trek: The Next Generation movies and the Alliance worlds in the movie Serenity.

Peters, who wrote the pilot episode with his mentor Sam Egan, felt that it was important to reveal the Visitors' secret quickly, as: "There is this huge awareness of the original. The story is already known and out there, so we want to leap forward quickly, so we don't build and build and build to something people already know." Co-producer Jeffrey Bell, commenting on differences between the original and reimagining, stated:

This is quite different. The original series, to me, felt very much like a military show. It was about a resistance and gunfights. There was a clear and present enemy. They wore uniforms. It was the Cold War; it was the Nazis; it was whoever. Post 9/11, that's not who our enemy is anymore. There is no single threat. It's terrorists; it's the guy across the street or the woman next door. Who do you trust? We have humans who are traitors; we have Visitors who have a nefarious agenda; we have Visitors who are heroes. We're trying to play on the paranoia of living in a world where we wake up every day and we don't know whether someone is who or what they seem to be.

— Jeffrey Bell, Calgary Herald

While similarities between the Visitors and the Obama and Bush administrations have been discussed in the media, Peters refuted that they were intentional. He has stated that the theme of the show is "blind devotion", with no political or religious agenda. Peters commented: "Watching any television show is a subjective experience. If you're looking for something in a show, you can find it, whether you're on one side of the political spectrum or the other. The central theme of this show is blind devotion, and you can look at that in two different ways. It's our job, as storytellers, to put some provocative things out there and leave some things open to interpretation." Bell added: "We're talking about metaphors and allegories here. On a certain level, I just want to remind people it's a show about spaceships."

=== Casting ===
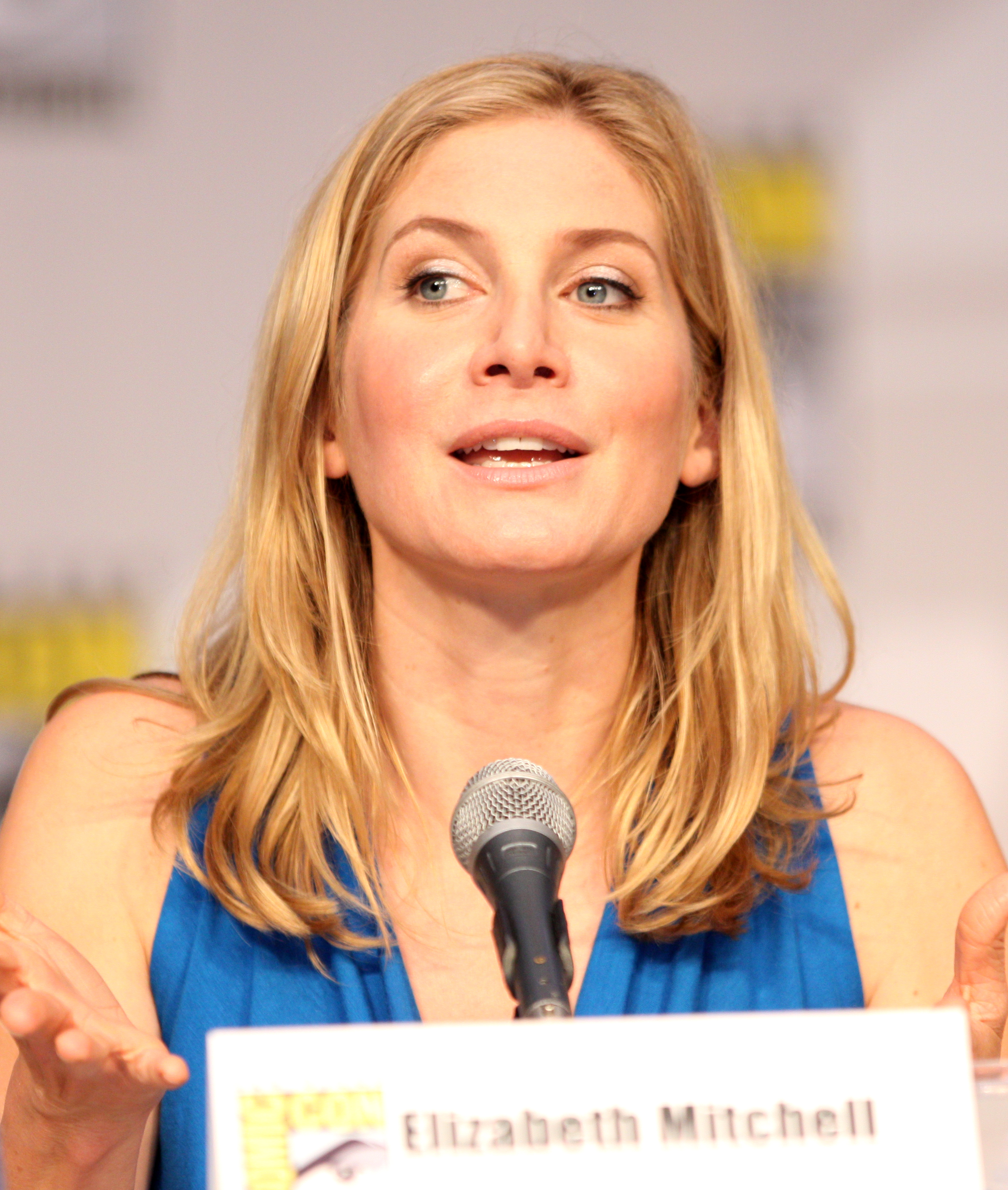
Elizabeth Mitchell plays Erica Evans, a "traditional hero"

The cast of V features a number of actors from other science-fiction series, including Lost, Firefly and Smallville. Peters has stated that the casting of so many actors from a science-fiction background was coincidental, explaining: "Obviously, we went for the best actors we could possibly find. It's a nice bonus that a lot of these folks have appeared in genre shows in the past, but it was not designed that way. We also wanted to make sure that as we moved forward, we honoured and respected the characters and the themes that the (original) show envisioned, while introducing brand new characters and brand new themes that make sense in a post-9/11 world." Mitchell was a fan of the original series as a child, recalling: "I liked the escape of it; I liked the entertainment of it. It was a fun night for me. I was allowed to watch an hour of television with my parents, and we made a kind of celebration of it. I hope that other teenagers will do that with their parents with this show." Mitchell's role in V sees her play an FBI agent with traits traditionally assigned to males. She commented: "I like playing a traditional hero. I don't think I've ever done it before. Sigourney Weaver said she always chooses male roles because they are meatier." Mitchell characterizes Erica as having "a little bit of a hero complex", but "her joy and her love and her true affection is with her son, and the fact that he is in imminent danger (makes it) fun to play."

Fifty to sixty actresses auditioned for the role of Anna. Baccarin was initially rejected following her audition, as Peters did not believe she had the right look for the role. He reconsidered, however, and believes that Baccarin brings a seriousness and "commanding presence" to the part. Baccarin has said of her role: "being, I guess, the face of what people want to see... I think there's an aspect of politicians: You need to embody what everybody wants to see, and at the same time you have your own agenda." Laura Vandervoort plays the Visitor Lisa. Vandervoort is unaware of Lisa's ultimate agenda, which she believes makes the creative process more exciting. She explained: "My direction is to play her as honestly as possible, so I'm playing her as a human with a secret. I'm playing a young 17-year-old who is possibly in love."

Scott Wolf spoke of his role as journalist Chad Decker: "Part of the fun will be that relationship between his ambition and his journalistic integrity." David Richmond-Peck who plays Georgie has deemed his character: "A really dark, multi-layered complex character with a past. It's an extremely demanding role because of the weight this character carries. Even just doing a scene in an office, at the end of the day your neck is cramped up — to maintain that intensity in the performance is an extreme amount of mental and physical work even while standing still. You’ve got to have that on you at all times." Joel Gretsch was cast as Catholic priest Jack Landry. The character was originally scripted as being much younger, in his late twenties to early thirties. When the production team cast Mitchell as Erica, they began to consider making Jack "a little bit more man's man", and cast Gretsch in the role when he coincidentally contacted Peters immediately after this alteration had been made. Peters characterized Jack's motivation in the pilot episode as attempting to reconcile the reality of arriving spaceships with his religious beliefs, finding his faith shaken.

=== Promotion ===
ABC executives intended to promote the episode's broadcast by hiring skywriters to create giant 'V's above twenty-six US landmarks from October 23, 2009, until the premiere on November 3, 2009. The campaign would have targeted 15 cities across the US. Lisa de Moraes for The Washington Post criticized the idea, noting that ABC's parent company Disney had previously announced its intention to cut carbon emissions from fuels by half by 2012 as part of its commitment to environmental affairs. Aviation authorities estimated that ABC's marketing stunt would use around 400 gallons of fuel, containing 800 grams of lead, releasing three tons of CO_{2} and other pollutants into the atmosphere. Following de Moraes' complaint, the skywriting plans were subsequently cancelled, with an ABC representative commenting that the network had decided to spend its money on alternate initiatives.

== Reception ==
The episode was watched by 14.3 million US viewers, and attained a 5.2/14 in the 18-49 demographic. It was watched by 2.16 million Canadian viewers, making it the first debut of the 2009 Canadian TV season to attain over 2 million viewers. The episode received generally favorable reviews, with E! Online rating it 11/10 and calling it "the best pilot we've seen in, well, forever." USA Today's Robert Bianco put V on his list of the top ten new shows of the TV season, stating that the remake is well-made and "quickly establishes its own identity." Comparing it to the original series, Bianco noted that the remake could easily have been a failure, yet managed to "contemporize the story without drowning it in paranoia." Maureen Ryan for the Chicago Tribune noted that the "character drama" in the pilot episode was "clunky" but overall found the episode "solidly entertaining and suitably suspenseful." Ken Tucker for Entertainment Weekly graded the episode 'B+' calling it "excellently acted" and noting that Mitchell is "fast becoming TV's go-to gal for strong, brainy women of action". Variety's Brian Lowry opined that the episode "busily races through too much business, but it dangles a tantalizing array of plots, and features a knockout performance (in more ways than one) by Morena Baccarin as the cool, beguiling alien leader." He called Baccarin the "real breakout" star of the episode, deeming Anna "TV's coolest alien since the invention of the Vulcan nerve pinch."

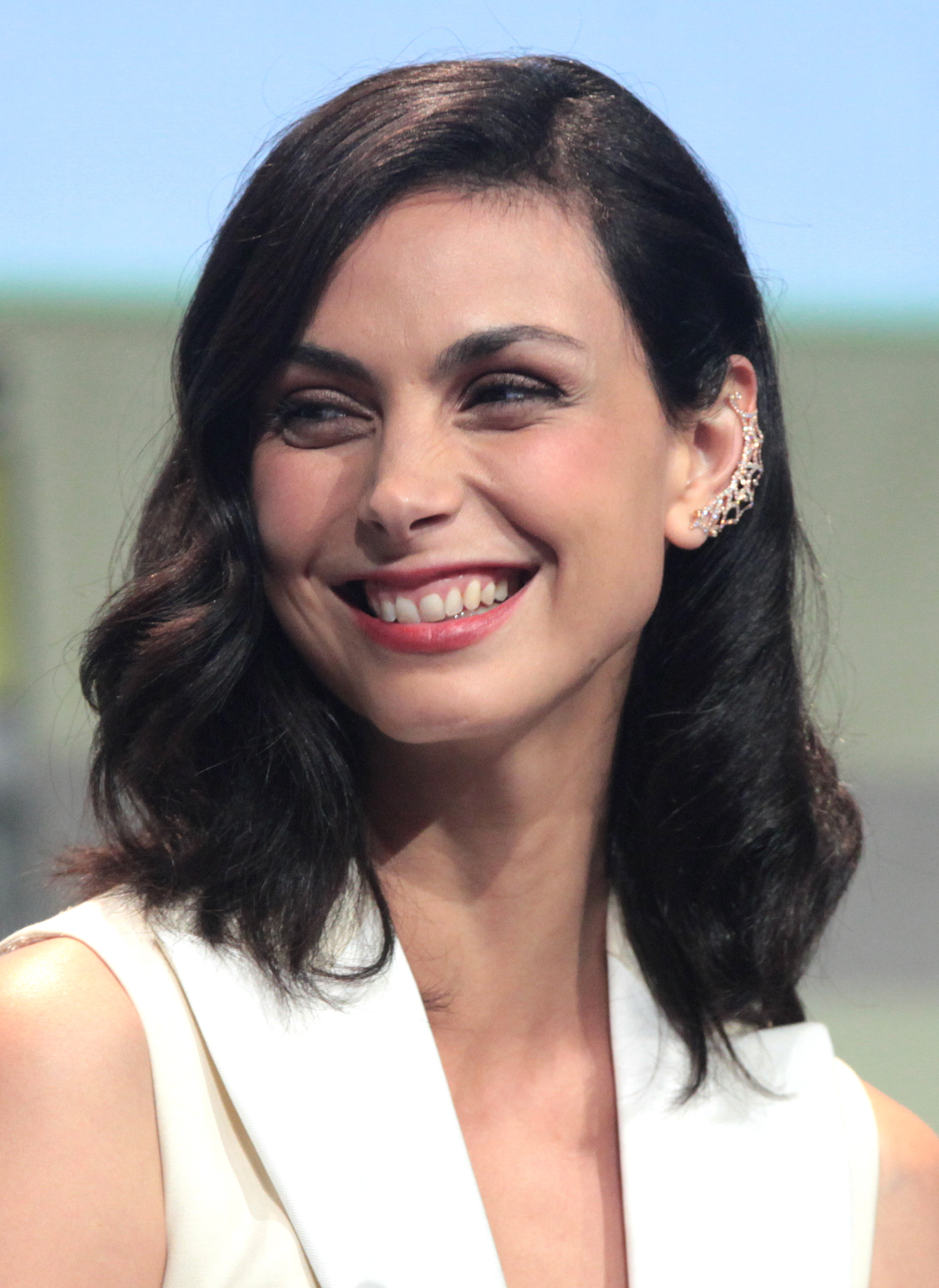
Variety's Brian Lowry praised Morena Baccarin as Anna, the Visitors' leader

Mary McNamara for the Los Angeles Times commented on parallels drawn between the Visitors and President Barack Obama, insofar as: "The instant adoration, the attractiveness and rhetorical skills of Anna, the idea that the Visitors will woo us with universal healthcare and then destroy us all seem a right-wingish take on the president's ascendancy." She continued: "Perhaps that is the creators' intent, but most successful science fiction contains an element of, if not outright humor, then the absurd. That the human race will be enslaved not through brainwashing or firepower but adequate healthcare is pretty hilarious in a dark and almost possible way. And Anna and her crew seem to embody more of a Wall Street deregulated/Bernie Madoff mentality—big returns for minimum investment. And we all know how that turns out." Linda Stasi for The New York Post conversely compared the Visitors to extremist Muslims. Though in the original series the aliens were a metaphor for Nazis, Stasi commented: "TV shows no longer have to rely on Nazis, because now we have the hated extremist Muslims to make all bad-guy metaphors with", adding on the Visitors' appearance: "Once you peel back the outer, good-looking shell, you've got your standard outer-space Nazi/Taliban lizard person lurking beneath."

Matt Roush for TV Guide compared the V pilot to science-fiction shows Lost and FlashForward, noting that V is "undeniably more simplistic [...] in its us-vs.-them setup", but commenting that he was "instantly seduced and hooked by its lavish production values, the immediately gripping storyline and a strong cast", concluding: V may not initially dig as deep as FlashForward, but there's a juicy urgency to all of the interpersonal and intergalactic melodrama, with plenty of action and surprising reveals." King Features' entertainment reporter Cindy Elavsky called V: "the best new show on television, by far. The special effects are feature-film quality; the writing is intelligent and time-relevant; and the acting is first-rate. The first five minutes alone will hook you for the entire season."

In contrast, Mike Hale for The New York Times commented: "The ideas in V, about alien encounters and mass delusion and media manipulation, are enticing. It's too bad that they're floating around in a show that at this early stage, is so slapdash and formulaic in its storytelling." Heather Havrilesky of Salon.com commented that plot points such as the Visitors attempting to create worldwide instability by printing fake IDs were unbelievable, and that talk of launching a resistance movement was "tiresome and pointless". She posed the question: "Isn't there a new way to handle the alien invasion story? Isn't there something a little more subtle and hauntingly evil out there than sneaky reptiles with really good publicists?" David Hinckley for the Daily News called the episode "an elaborately costumed popcorn flick", opining that whilst the original series "probed the subtleties of human psychology in the face of ominous uncertainty that threatened to become mortal danger", the reimagining is "about as subtle as a Donald Trump boardroom firing."
