= Luvia Petersen =

Canadian actress

- Occupation: Actress
- Years active: 2004–present
- Spouse: Jessie Robertson (m. 2015)
- Website: luviapetersen.com

Luvia Petersen is a Canadian actress best known for her role on the TV series Continuum and Ghost Wars, where she was part of the main cast.

Petersen is also co-owner of Vancouver tattoo studio Liquid Amber Tattoo & Art Collective, which opened in 2001.

In 2015, Luvia married her wife, Jessie Robertson. They have been together since 2010. She is openly bisexual, and has spoken of being told not to publicly be with women in the past for fear it would damage her career. Peterson criticized the lack of LGBT actors playing LGBT roles in 2013.

== Filmography ==
Year	Title	Role	Notes
2004–2005	The L Word	Cowboy / Dax	2 Episodes
2007	Hot Pink Shorts	Herself	6 Episodes
2008	The X-Files: I Want to Believe	O.R. nurse	
2009	Battlestar Galactica: The Plan	Kai	
2010	Sanctuary	Narra	"Hollow Men" (Season 3, Episode 10)
2012–2015	Continuum	Jasmine Garza	34 episodes
2013	Falling Skies	Lt. Catherine Fisher	2 Episodes
2014	Psych	Arlene	"Cog Blocked" (Season 8, Episode 4)
2014	The 100	Sienne	"Many Happy Returns" (Season 2, Episode 4)
2015	Proof	nurse Hannah	"Memento Vivere" (Season 1, Episode 5)
2015-2016	Motive	Lisa Benoit	3 episodes
2016	The Confirmation	Bartender Nancy	
2016	Moonshot	Nova	Short film
2016	Dead Rising: Endgame	Samantha	
2017	Dead Rising 4	Jessa	Video Game (Voice)
2017	Static Alex	Sam	Short film
2017	Ghost Wars	Val McGrath-Dufresne	Netflix Original Series
2018	Scorched Earth	Chavo	
2019	The Murders	Det. Meg Harris	7 Episodes
2019	Supernatural	Sue Barrish	"Our Father, Who Aren't in Heaven" (Season 15, Episode 8")
2019-2023	Riverdale	Brooke	2 Episodes
2021	Van Helsing	Sgt. Weathers	4 episodes
2021	A Lot Like Christmas	Marcia Chase	
2022	Devil in Ohio	Detective Anne Beechum	2 episodes
2023	School Spirits	Hayes	2 episodes
2024	The Chicken Sisters	Mary Pat	3 episodes
2024	Holiday Crashers	St. Jack-Jean	
2025	Fire Country	Agent Ruffin	"You're Voice in My Head" (Season 4, Episode 6)
2025	Tracker	Detective Monroe	"The Field Trip" (Season 3, Episode 14
