= The Entrance (film) =

- Directed by: Damon Vignale
- Written by: Damon Vignale
- Produced by: Andrew Hamilton; Paul Marshall
- Starring: Sarah-Jane Redmond; Michael Eklund; Ron Sauve; Frank Cassini; C. Ernst Harth; Jerry Wasserman; Colin Cunningham
- Cinematography: Larry Lynn
- Edited by: Daryl Bennett; Damon Vignale
- Music by: Daryl Bennett
- Distributed by: Lions Gate
- Release dates: October 6, 2006 (Eerie Horror Film Festival); December 16, 2007 (Canada)
- Running time: 81 minutes
- Country: Canada
- Language: English

The Entrance is a 2006 independent Canadian horror thriller film directed and written by Damon Vignale. The film stars Sarah-Jane Redmond, Michael Eklund and Ron Sauvé.

The film premiered on the 6th October 2006 in the United States, 16 December 2007 in Canada and put on streaming platform on 1 January 2010.

== Plot ==
The movie opens on a man, Ryan James, fleeing for his life in a parking ramp. With the assistance of a janitor, Joe, Ryan is able to escape. He makes his way to a police station and speaks with Detective Porhowski, to whom he explains the events that unfolded that night.

Ryan claims that he and four other men were abducted, locked in a basement and told they must play a series of games, the winner of which would be allowed to live. Before any games begin, one man attempts escape and is killed before the others. The four remaining men comply and start their first game, musical chairs. When one of the men loses, a film projector shows a clip of the man molesting his nephew. The three remaining men move on to the next game, bingo. Ryan calls out the numbers and when both the men at the table win, Ryan's video plays. He is shown to be a drug dealer whose product has resulted in many overdoses. At this time Ryan manages to escape to the parking ramp where he is chased by a demon.

At this point Detective Porhowski, naturally, does not believe the story she is being told. Ryan asks the detective for a glass of water. When she returns she finds that the man has left, though he kidnaps her shortly afterward.

At this time the final game is going on between the last two men, poker. As the game comes to an end, one of the men reveals he is The Devil and the other flees.

At this time Ryan brings Porhowski to the very place he escaped from, claiming that was the Janitor's price for allowing Ryan to leave. The janitor escorts Porhowski to the basement where the final man's video is shown. He is the man who raped Detective Porhowski years earlier. The janitor and The Devil watch as Porhowski struggles with herself about killing the man, but ultimately does not, shortly thereafter she is knocked out.

When she comes to, she is in a cab, driven by The Devil, being brought to a large manor. Inside she finds her dead father and struggles with Ryan James, who is now possessed by the demon that held the janitor earlier, Balberith.

The title credit cites the work of Father Sebastien Michaelis as inspiration for the film. He wrote a book that listed the Hierarchy of Devils as revealed to him by a possessed nun.
