= The Invitation (2003 film) =

- Directed by: Pat Bermel
- Screenplay by: Pat Bermel; Neil Bermel
- Produced by: Pat Bermel; Neil Bermel
- Starring: Lance Henriksen; Christopher Shyer; Stellina Rusich
- Cinematography: Barry Donlevy
- Edited by: Dona Noga
- Music by: Michael Richard Plowman
- Production company: Stage 18 Pictures
- Distributed by: ECG Worldwide Entertainment
- Release date: February 24, 2003; United States (AFM premiere)
- Running time: 85 minutes
- Country: Canada
- Language: English

The Invitation is a thriller and horror film released on February 24, 2003. It is rated R and runs approximately 1 hour and 25 minutes. The movie was written and directed by Pat Bermel and stars Lance Henriksen, Christopher Shyer, Stellina Rusich, Stefanie von Pfetten, David Livingstone, Douglas O'Keeffe, Sarah-Jane Redmond, and Lideo Baldeon.

== Plot summary ==
Famous author Roland Levy holds a dinner party for his six closest friends on a private island, where he deliberately poisons them by lacing their food with it. To receive the antidote, they must reveal their darkest secrets or take them to the grave.

== Cast ==
- Lance Henriksen as Roland Levy
- Christopher Shyer as Joel Gellman
- Stellina Rusich as Liza Harris
- Stefanie von Pfetten as Anne Prescott
- David Livingstone as John Leveque
- Douglas O'Keeffe as Michael Harris
- Sarah-Jane Redmond as Maria Gellman (as Sarah Jane Redmond)
- Lideo Baldeon as Jesus
