= List of V (2009 TV series) episodes =

V is an American science fiction television series that aired for two seasons on ABC, from November 3, 2009 to March 15, 2011. A remake of the 1983 miniseries created by Kenneth Johnson, the new series chronicles the arrival on Earth of a technologically advanced alien species which ostensibly comes in peace, but actually has sinister motives. V stars Elizabeth Mitchell and Morena Baccarin, and is executive produced by Scott Rosenbaum, Yves Simoneau, Scott Peters, Steve Pearlman, and Jace Hall. The series was produced by The Scott Peters Company, HDFilms and Warner Bros. Television.

During the course of the series, 22 episodes of V aired over two seasons.

== Series overview ==
| Season | Episodes | Originally released | |
| Season | Episodes | First released | Last released |
|---|---|---|---|
| 1 | 12 | November 3, 2009 | May 18, 2010 |
| 2 | 10 | January 4, 2011 | March 15, 2011 |

== Episodes ==
=== Season 1 (2009–10) ===
The first season of the re-imagining of V consisted of 12 episodes and premiered at 8:00 pm ET on ABC on November 3, 2009. Four episodes were aired in November 2009 and the series then went on hiatus before returning on March 30, 2010 when it aired in a new time slot, 10:00 pm ET. A special clip show titled "The Arrival" that recaps the first four episodes aired on March 23, 2010. The first four episodes averaged 9.75 million viewers; when the series returned in 2010 for the remainder of its first season in a new timeslot, the final episodes averaged 5.72 million viewers. In total, the first season averaged 7.74 million viewers.

| No. overall | No. in season | Title | Directed by | Written by | Original release date | Prod. code | US viewers (millions) |
|---|---|---|---|---|---|---|---|
| 1 | 1 | "Pilot" | Yves Simoneau | Story by : Kenneth Johnson and Scott Peters; Teleplay by : Scott Peters | November 3, 2009 | 3X5441 | 14.30 |
Without warning, a fleet of huge alien spaceships arrive at Earth and position themselves over 29 cities across the globe. Anna, the beautiful leader of the alien "Visitors", speaks to the people of Earth and declares they have come in peace. Explaining that they are far from their homeworld and require certain minerals from Earth to sustain themselves, the Visitors offer to share their technology with humanity in return. Within a short time, the Visitors are widely welcomed as they offer their medical technology to provide miraculous cures for conditions such as blindness and paralysis. Many people begin to view the Visitors as saviors of humanity, but not everybody is convinced. FBI agent Erica Evans and priest Father Jack Landry meet resistance fighter Georgie Sutton, and discover that the Visitors are actually a race of malevolent reptilians underneath their seemingly human features. Worse still, they have secretly been infiltrating Earth for years.
| 2 | 2 | "There Is No Normal Anymore" | Yves Simoneau | Scott Peters & Sam Egan | November 10, 2009 | 3X5401 | 10.70 |
Erica and Jack are attacked by a Visitor "seeker" device while attempting to contact the police, but are able to destroy it. Erica tries to keep her son Tyler away from the Vs, unaware that he has become a Visitor peace ambassador. On his first day in the role he gets into a fight with an anti-Visitor protester and is thrown out of the program. Ryan Nichols, a renegade "Fifth Column" Visitor, seeks help to repair the cloned human skin on his arm from another renegade Visitor, Angelo Russo. Anna uses ambitious TV news reporter Chad Decker as her spokesman to the world while the United States grants diplomatic status to the Visitors. Dale Maddox, formerly Erica's FBI partner, is reported missing, but Erica is unable to tell her superiors that she discovered he was actually a Visitor himself and that she was forced to kill him. However, Dale is revealed to be in the Visitors' spaceship and is still alive.
| 3 | 3 | "A Bright New Day" | Frederick E. O. Toye | Diego Gutierrez & Christine Roum | November 17, 2009 | 3X5402 | 9.32 |
Erica is assigned to protect the Vs after they receive a death threat, as her son Tyler begins to feel closer to Visitor youth leader Lisa, who is revealed to be Anna's daughter. Father Jack and Ryan each search for more Resistance fighters.
| 4 | 4 | "It's Only the Beginning" | Yves Simoneau | Cameron Litvack & Angela Russo Otstot | November 24, 2009 | 3X5403 | 9.20 |
Anna wants Lisa to bring Tyler up to the mothership for an important experiment with Lisa. A warehouse full of flu vaccine donated by the Visitors is destroyed by Erica and her accomplices after it is discovered that the Visitors are using it to inject human beings with a biological "tag" so that they can be traced anywhere. Father Jack is stabbed in his church by a Visitor agent. Meanwhile, far out in space, a massive armada of Visitor motherships awaits.
| 5 | 5 | "Welcome to the War" | Yves Simoneau | Scott Rosenbaum | March 30, 2010 | 3X5404 | 7.03 |
Erica finds her life in danger when she's attacked at home. A dangerous new member, Kyle Hobbes, is recruited for the Resistance, as the Visitors shore up their defenses. Anna wonders why Chad hasn't followed up on his diagnosed aneurysm. Ryan's concern grows over Val's "abnormal" pregnancy. Planning to breed more soldiers for their cause, Anna mates with one of her subjects - and then devours him.
| 6 | 6 | "Pound of Flesh" | Dean White | Charles Murray & Natalie Chaidez | April 6, 2010 | 3X5405 | 5.79 |
Anna introduces her "live aboard" program and invites select groups of humans to stay on each of the 29 motherships under the pretense of allowing them to observe the Visitors' way of life. Ryan must deal with the fact that Valerie’s pregnancy is wildly accelerated. Georgie sacrifices himself to save Ryan and is captured by the Visitors.
| 7 | 7 | "John May" | Jonathan Frakes | Gregg Hurwitz | April 13, 2010 | 3X5406 | 5.61 |
Erica, Ryan and Jack go on a harrowing mission to find the legendary John May (Michael Trucco) in order to rescue Georgie. Anna brings Chad aboard the mothership for a story on her Live Aboard Program, and Tyler confronts his mom about his mysterious past.
| 8 | 8 | "We Can't Win" | David Barrett | Christine Roum & Cameron Litvack | April 20, 2010 | 3X5407 | 5.81 |
Chad and Anna are in Geneva for the U.N. Summit, where Anna is going to present a gift of "Blue Energy" technology to the world. It is there that the U.N. Secretary General reveals his beliefs that the Vs aren't just visiting Earth. Erica learns that the V Task Force is investigating The Fifth Column. Valerie goes on the run, knowing something is different about her baby and doubting she can trust Ryan.
| 9 | 9 | "Heretic's Fork" | Frederick E. O. Toye | John Wirth & Angela Russo Otstot | April 27, 2010 | 3X5408 | 4.87 |
Erica, Father Jack and Hobbes realize that the Vs know names and addresses of The Fifth Column members and must take drastic measures to protect them. Ryan finally reveals to Val that he's a Visitor. He tries to save Val by bringing her to his friends, but the two are tracked by one of Anna's soldiers. Chad begins the process aboard the mothership's medical bay to have his aneurysm removed, filming it for his TV news show. Soon after, Chad shows his gratitude to Anna and expresses a desire to expose The Fifth Column as terrorists.
| 10 | 10 | "Hearts and Minds" | Bobby Roth | Gregg Hurwitz | May 4, 2010 | 3X5409 | 5.37 |
Erica, Ryan, Father Jack and Kyle Hobbes learn Anna has sent a shuttle filled with a deadly V tracker team to find them, and must figure out how to stop the shuttle from landing. Anna is tipped off about the attack, and instead of avoiding the attack, she sends a decoy shuttle. Anna gives Tyler his invitation to the Live Aboard Program, but Lisa makes a surprise confession to Tyler. Chad confronts Father Jack on what he knows about The Fifth Column. The FBI forms a task force to track and capture Fifth Column members. Erica and Agent Sarita Malik are assigned to head the task force.
| 11 | 11 | "Fruition" | Bryan Spicer | John Wirth & Natalie Chaidez | May 11, 2010 | 3X5410 | 5.69 |
Anna's daughter is the victim of a violent anti-V attack, but it was actually Anna who had her assaulted in order to use it for publicity. Erica and her Resistance cell look for a scientist who may have created a biological weapon that the Visitors fear. Kyle makes a deal with Marcus.
| 12 | 12 | "Red Sky" | Robert Duncan McNeill | Scott Rosenbaum & Gregg Hurwitz | May 18, 2010 | 3X5411 | 5.86 |
Val, whose water has just broken, is captured by Anna's soldier and taken to the mothership, where she serves as bait to draw Ryan to Anna. Erica seizes an invitation to dinner with Anna and Lisa as an opportunity to destroy Anna's soldier eggs. Chad begins to catch on to how he is being used. Marcus tries to sway Kyle to work for the Visitors by revealing a shocking truth about Kyle's past exploits. Anna gives Valerie a lethal injection after her baby is delivered. The Fifth Column gains a new ally. Anna's warrior eggs are destroyed by Erica using a blue energy grenade, killing all but 12 of them. Joshua tells Erica to kill him to make her seem innocent, but he is later brought back to life by the V doctors. Anna is horrified upon being overcome by human emotion for her lost eggs. An enraged Anna removes the cloaking on a massive fleet of Visitor ships waiting in space and makes Earth's skies turn blood red, signaling the beginning of a yet to be seen event.

=== Season 2 (2011) ===
ABC announced V would return on January 4, 2011 for a second season, airing on Tuesdays at 9:00 pm ET. It contained a reduced order of 10 episodes. Charles Mesure, who portrays Kyle Hobbes, was promoted to a series regular. Jane Badler appears in a recurring role as Anna's mother, Diana, the previous leader of the Visitors. Badler portrayed the main antagonist, also called Diana, in the original V television series from the 1980s though the new character of Diana in the re-imagined version of V is somewhat different from Badler's original role. Marc Singer, who also appeared in the original V series as the protagonist Mike Donovan, appeared as Project Ares leader Lars Tremont in the season finale.

| No. overall | No. in season | Title | Directed by | Written by | Original release date | Prod. code | US viewers (millions) |
|---|---|---|---|---|---|---|---|
| 13 | 1 | "Red Rain" | Bryan Spicer | Scott Rosenbaum & Gregg Hurwitz | January 4, 2011 | 3X6201 | 6.59 |
With Red Sky and now Red Rain unleashed on the planet, the world is on the brink of war and there is chaos all around. Ryan is being kept in isolation on the mothership, as Anna wants to experiment on his hybrid baby. Seeking redemption for being used by Anna, Chad wants to fight with the Fifth Column. After being revived from his fatal shooting, Joshua shows no recollection of his previous Fifth Column ties. Anna announces to humanity that Red Rain is a gift that will repair the ecological damage done to the Earth's oceans and will reduce global warming. Erica goes on a journey to find a scientist who can give her the answers to what Red Rain really is, and there she learns the horrifying secret of why the Visitors have come to Earth - they need humans in order to breed. Though Anna tells the world that the Red Rain will cleanse decades of damage caused by humanity's pollution of the Earth, it is in fact a biological agent that increases phosphorus in all humans, which will eventually make them viable for breeding with the Visitors. After the remainder of Anna's soldier offspring dies, she goes into a secret area in the bowels of the mothership where she confronts her mother, Diana (Jane Badler).
| 14 | 2 | "Serpent's Tooth" | Steve Shill | Gregg Hurwitz | January 11, 2011 | 3X6202 | 5.77 |
In the dark bowels of the mothership, Anna confronts her mother Diana—the previous leader of their race. So that she could seize power, Anna overthrew her mother and imprisoned her for the past 15 years, allowing the rest of their race to believe she was dead. Anna asks her mother about understanding human emotion and the human soul which she considers to be humanity's greatest defense as it empowers people. Diana discovers through Anna that Earth is the last viable planet close enough where the Visitors can continue their species, but tells her that using humans for breeding purposes will only ensure that the next generation of Vs have emotions and that she will be unable to control them. Meanwhile, Erica has Tyler's blood analyzed as she believes the Visitors may have done something to her when she was pregnant with him 18 years earlier. Ryan seeks advice from Father Jack regarding whether or not he has a soul, while Anna tries to lure him back to her side by giving his daughter an illness. Chad is a target of a Fifth Column attack. Erica and Agent Malik follow a lead where they both become suspicious of each other leading to a struggle which causes their vehicle to crash.
| 15 | 3 | "Laid Bare" | David Barrett | Gwendolyn M. Parker | January 18, 2011 | 3X6203 | 5.70 |
After Erica discovers Malik is a Visitor sleeper agent, they fight but Erica manages to knock Malik out. Jack and Hobbes arrive at the scene, taking Malik with them to gain information. When Anna learns that Malik is missing, she orders Ryan to find her. Anna also asks Chad to interview Jack and uses it against him when she sends a V to his church to provoke a fight, which is caught on video with the help of Tyler, making Jack look violent. Malik refuses to give answers to the Fifth Column until she gets skinned, finally giving Erica information regarding a young runaway girl whose life is in danger at the hand of the Visitors. Erica learns that Tyler's DNA is incomplete and realizes that the Visitors did this to him while she was pregnant with him, but wonders why. Lisa realizes her body is beginning to change as she approaches the breeding phase of her life. Anna tells her to embrace the changes, and tests Lisa by forcing her to kill a human that they are experimenting on. The Fifth Column rescues the girl Malik mentioned, and reunites her with her mother. Anna visits Diana again as she continues to look for a way to isolate the soul in humans, and gloats that Lisa is approaching the breeding phase of her life. However Diana warns Anna that her daughter will eventually turn on her, much like Anna turned on Diana. Anna reveals to Tyler that she considers him to be like a son. When Chad finds out he was used by Anna, Jack introduces him to the Fifth Column members. After Malik dies, Ryan is reunited with his daughter onboard the mothership and tells Anna he knows the location of the Fifth Column.
| 16 | 4 | "Unholy Alliance" | Dean White | Rockne S. O'Bannon | February 1, 2011 | 3X6204 | 5.29 |
Erica and her boss Paul discover that three peace ambassadors have been killed. While at work, Erica meets her new FBI partner Chris Bolling (Jay Karnes), with whom she went through training. Erica, Hobbes and Ryan find Eli Cohn (Oded Fehr), the leader of a radical faction of Fifth Column and come to an agreement with him, using the men that killed the peace ambassadors as a scapegoat for Agent Malik's death. Anna meets with a prominent bishop in Vatican City, and coerces the college of cardinals to become official missionaries to the Vs only if they condemn any priests who speak out against the Vs. Anna discovers that one of the bishop's closest advisers is a former Visitor sleeper agent who had worked for Diana. Anna forces him to return to the mothership to find out what he has learned about human emotion and the human soul, but he will only share his knowledge with Diana. Anna brings him to Diana, who then kills him before Anna can learn what he knows. Diana informs her daughter that the human soul is actually a blessing rather than a curse, but Anna feels that she has enough evidence to use emotions and the soul against humans. Tyler and his friends vandalize Jack's church to get revenge for the murders of Tyler's fellow peace ambassadors. Paul and Chris discover surveillance footage of Erica and Jack conversing, and they become suspicious of her. Jack finds Tyler's phone with video of him vandalizing the church, and shares it with Erica. Ryan returns to the mothership and gives Anna the severed head of Agent Malik. Ryan pleads with Anna to provide his daughter with Bliss, but Anna refuses until Ryan can get closer to Eli Cohn and help her finally bring down the Fifth Column.
| 17 | 5 | "Concordia" | Jesse Warn | David Rambo | February 8, 2011 | 3X6205 | 5.40 |
Anna reveals plans for her latest gift to humanity, "Concordia", citadel-like structures that will be built by humanity but will include a wealth of Visitor technology that humans will be trained to use. Anna claims that the Concordia project will form more jobs worldwide, along with healing centers and technological training services. However, the real reason behind Concordia is that it will be used as the next phase of the invasion by transporting human women up to a cloaked Visitor mothership in order to use them to breed. Meanwhile, for Tyler's 18th birthday, Erica and her ex-husband Joe present him with his gift, Joe's motorcycle, a cross-country trip, and being reunited again as a family. Anna responds by offering Tyler the gift of being the first human to train to fly a V shuttle. The Fifth Column, including Eli Cohn, set up a plan to assassinate Anna at the gala presentation for Concordia. Before Hobbes can make the shot, Ryan (fearing that only Anna's Bliss can keep his daughter healthy) contacts Marcus, warning him of the assassination attempt. Marcus informs Anna and takes the stage in her place. Hobbes decides to kill Marcus anyway, in order to "cut off Anna's right hand", but only succeeds in critically wounding him. Thomas (Martin Cummins), the engineer of Concordia, is appointed Anna's new second-in-command. Jack is confronted by Father Travis, who informs him that his recent actions may have given reason for the Vatican to take away his collar. Jack stands firm, stating they can take away his collar but not his faith. After the shooting, Tyler eventually chooses his family's gift instead of Anna's. Erica's boss and her FBI partner decide to covertly launch an investigation into her recent actions. Ryan is told by Anna to infiltrate the Fifth Column further. He complies, acknowledging her as "my queen", but Hobbes and Cohn have already guessed that Ryan was the one who betrayed them.
| 18 | 6 | "Siege" | John Behring | Dean Widenmann | February 15, 2011 | 3X6206 | 5.43 |
Ryan is captured by Cohn and his men after he is sent by Anna to infiltrate the Fifth Column and kill Cohn. Father Travis tells Father Jack that he has been laicized from the church, and Jack hands over his collar. Ryan is found by a V tracker, and Anna has Thomas leave an anonymous tip for the FBI, hoping to cause a fight between the FBI and Fifth Column as well as killing Tyler's parents. Erica asks Ryan why he betrayed his allies; he explains that he is protecting his daughter, and tells them to leave or else they are all dead. Erica decides to feign the role of a hostage and to make it plausible, she has Cohn hit her in the face. Joe and Tyler are watching a football game when they both see Erica as a hostage, and Joe takes off and goes to the site. The FBI uses a piece of V technology that allows them to see their targets inside the compound. With that the FBI is about to deliver the final blow, but then Cohn activates suicide bombers in the crowd outside, thus buying more time. Ryan apologizes to Erica, but she simply says "goodbye." Joe finds his way inside the compound thanks to the help of a V sleeper agent, Ray Caldwell. Cohn confronts Erica, knowing he'll never get out alive, and explains that she must take charge of the global Fifth Column. The group, excluding Cohn, exit the compound, and the building is detonated. Hobbes is shown to be responsible for this, acting for the sake of a former lover who he had presumed dead but who the V's tell him is actually alive. Joe is killed in the ensuing crossfire. After Erica breaks down, Tyler leaves, blaming the Fifth Column in anger despite his mother's claims that it is Anna's fault. Lisa meets her grandmother, Diana, and the two conspire to take down Anna. Erica returns to the basement and meets Chad, Jack and Hobbes. She says that the Fifth Column must now go on the offensive, and now that they have an army, they are going to "rain hell" on the Visitors.
| 19 | 7 | "Birth Pangs" | David Barrett | Cathryn Humphris | February 22, 2011 | 3X6207 | 5.14 |
Erica goes to Bangkok to meet with Eli Cohn's lieutenants. They are not convinced to follow her as the leader, even though Cohn gave her that position before he died. Erica and Hobbes then head to Hong Kong to confront the doctor who cared for her and Cohn's wife during their pregnancies. They confront the doctor, who turns out to be a Visitor, but she commits suicide rather than answer their questions. In her safe, they discover evidence of 29 survivors of the V's genetic experiments (one in each of the cities visited by motherships), including Tyler. With this new information, Sidney is finally able to uncover the V's master plan: to fast-track their own evolution using the best human DNA they can find. Meanwhile, Anna discovers that Tyler's phosphorus levels are abnormally low. When Joshua is unsure he can boost Tyler's phosphorus, Anna dispatches Rafael (who has the best clinical data among the 29 subjects) to the New York mothership, and asks Lisa to "entertain" him. Lisa and Diana begin to bond, uniting against Anna. Diana warns Lisa not to trust anyone on board the mothership, and not to reveal her emotions. However, she cannot continue her courtship of Rafael, due to her feelings for Tyler. Anna begins to doubt Lisa's loyalty, and asks Joshua to test her. She also reveals to Joshua that she has saved one last queen egg, so that she can replace Lisa if she should fail. Joshua warns that they need to accelerate the new hatchling's growth if they are to succeed. Anna then asks Joshua to experiment on Ryan's hybrid child. As a result of the experimentation, the child has aged quickly but is now immune to the pain that they initially gave her, and she no longer needs Anna's Bliss. Erica and the Fifth Column realize that the last batch of live-aboards will be transported to the motherships soon, and Anna will have all she needs for her breeding program. As a result, they plot to stop the last batch from arriving on board the mothership.
| 20 | 8 | "Uneasy Lies the Head" | Jeff Woolnough | Cameron Litvack & Gregg Hurwitz | March 1, 2011 | 3X6208 | 5.04 |
Erica, now in command of the Fifth Column worldwide, spearheads a hazardous attack against Anna by planting a virus into certain candidates of the Visitor's live-aboard program. The virus alters the DNA of anybody infected with it, therefore making the DNA worthless to the Visitors for use in the masterplan. However, one of the live-aboard candidates collapses just after boarding Anna's ship and, in the ensuing investigation by Joshua and Thomas, Anna uncovers Erica's plan. Consequently, all live-aboard residents that contained the virus are killed, and their DNA disposed of to avoid infecting the V's stockpile of viable human DNA. To cover up these killings, Anna reports that members of the Fifth Column had infiltrated the live-aboard program as suicide bombers. Realizing that the Fifth Column not only still exists but appears to be more organized, Anna dispatches Thomas to locate the new head of the organization. Meanwhile, Ryan attempts to rescue his daughter from the mothership, and is introduced by Lisa to his former queen, Diana. Diana instructs Ryan that she has secret escape shuttles hidden on the mothership. Ryan manages to escape, but without his daughter. All parties are unaware that his daughter is now immune to the painful illness that Anna inflicted on her, but Diana promises to bliss Ryan's child. Diana also tells Lisa to speak to Marcus, one of her former loyal confiders, who is still recovering from the assassination attempt. Jack has grown uneasy with Erica's increasing ruthlessness in her new position as leader of the Fifth Column, while Erica and Hobbes appear to be kindling a romance.
| 21 | 9 | "Devil in a Blue Dress" | Ralph Hemecker | Hans Tobeason | March 8, 2011 | 3X6209 | 4.98 |
Anna is planning to activate Earth's first Blue Energy reactor to fuel the Concordia project, but Sidney detects that the reactor provides "a trillion times" the wattage needed for Concordia and enough to fuel far more than the 29 visible motherships. Sensing that the reactor will be used for an attack, the Fifth Column sends Sidney in undercover to sabotage it. But the group is unaware that "weapon grade" blue energy is being produced and their sabotage plans will actually destroy everything within 100 miles. Acting on a tip from Lisa, Ryan gets to the reactor just in time to deactivate it. This causes a blackout in greater New York, but Anna gains a public relations victory when blame is placed on existing systems and her engineers quickly restore power. Chad's co-anchor Kerry is fired when he feeds her false information to protect his facade of siding with the Visitors, as well as protect her from Anna's wrath. Marcus meets Diana, who tells him Anna's human emotions (which Diana says go as far back as when "pride" led to Anna overthrowing her) will be her downfall. Marcus continues to side with Anna, but he then sees Anna embrace Ryan's daughter Amy (whose growth has continued to accelerate and now looks like an 8 year old girl). Amy calls Anna "mommy" and tells her she loves her, to which Anna responds warmly. Anna also discovers that she can use her Bliss on a single human, though it weakens her and causes her eyes to bleed. She orders Joshua to figure out how she can use it on masses of humans. When Lisa explains this to Diana, Diana instructs her to act against Anna immediately to save humanity and fulfill her destiny. Joshua, meanwhile, begins to regain memories of his time as a Fifth Columnist, and informs Lisa that he remembers who he really is. Sidney and Hobbes discover the Blue Energy signatures from a multitude of cloaked Visitor spaceships in the night sky. When Lisa explains to Erica that Anna has used her Bliss on Tyler, Erica believes humanity is doomed. But Lisa tells her they have one last chance: Lisa must overthrow her mother and become Queen of the Visitors.
| 22 | 10 | "Mother's Day" | Bryan Spicer | Scott Rosenbaum & Gregg Hurwitz | March 15, 2011 | 3X6210 | 5.51 |
Erica and the Fifth Column pretend to kidnap Lisa, and Anna is told to give herself up for Lisa's freedom. During the exchange, it is planned that Lisa will kill Anna, but Anna tricks her into thinking that she has decided that humans and Visitors should live in harmony and Lisa does not kill her as planned. Ryan and Joshua free Diana, who reveals herself to the other Visitors. Anna then sneaks up from behind her and kills her with her tail. Lisa is then imprisoned in Diana's former dungeon. Anna's queen egg hatches and the offspring has skin put on to look exactly like Lisa. Thinking she is the real Lisa, Tyler mates with her, after which the fake Lisa kills him while the real Lisa is forced to watch from her dungeon. Meanwhile, Ryan finds his daughter Amy, who has now matured to the level of an 11-year-old girl, and tries to convince her to escape the ship with him, but instead, Amy strangles him with her tail and appears to break his neck. Erica finds Hobbes is missing, but is then kidnapped and taken to a secret underground bunker a mile underneath Manhattan. The huge bunker houses Project Aries, a secret cabal of top ranking global military and government officials (including Erica's FBI boss Paul, and new partner Chris) who have long suspected the Visitors' real intentions and are preparing for a war with them. Upon reviewing video of the fake kidnapping of Lisa, Anna discovers Chad was involved and requests that he be brought to see her. Later, Anna tries to put Bliss on the whole world but it again causes her immense pain and makes her eyes bleed even more than ever. Amy sees what Anna is doing and tells Anna that she can Bliss the world for her, which she does. The only people who do not appear affected are those inside the underground bunker at Project Aries. Erica emerges from the bunker to find that everybody, including Jack, are all now under the control of the Bliss. More motherships reveal themselves across the globe, to enslave humanity forever.

== Ratings ==
V : U.S. viewers per episode (millions)

| Season | Episode number | | | | | | | | | | | |
| Season | 1 | 2 | 3 | 4 | 5 | 6 | 7 | 8 | 9 | 10 | 11 | 12 |
|---|---|---|---|---|---|---|---|---|---|---|---|---|
| 1 | 14.30 | 10.70 | 9.32 | 9.20 | 7.03 | 5.79 | 5.61 | 5.81 | 4.87 | 5.37 | 5.69 | 5.86 |
| 2 | 6.59 | 5.77 | 5.70 | 5.29 | 5.40 | 5.43 | 5.14 | 5.04 | 4.98 | 5.51 | – | |

Audience measurement performed by Nielsen Media Research
