= Ghost Wars (TV series) =

- Genre: Drama; Action; Paranormal; Horror
- Created by: Simon Barry
- Starring: Avan Jogia; Kim Coates; Luvia Petersen; Vincent D'Onofrio; Meat Loaf; Kandyse McClure; Kristin Lehman
- Countries of origin: United States; Canada
- Original language: English
- No. of seasons: 1
- No. of episodes: 13

Production
- Executive producers: Dennis Heaton; David Von Ancken; Simon Barry; Chad Oakes; Michael Frislev; Chris Regina
- Running time: 42–43 minutes
- Production companies: Reality Distortion Field; Nomadic Pictures

Original release
- Network: Syfy
- Release: October 5, 2017 – January 4, 2018

Ghost Wars is a paranormal action television series created by Simon Barry. It premiered on Syfy on October 5, 2017, and concluded on January 4, 2018. Thirteen episodes were produced for the series. The series was released on Netflix in the UK on March 2, 2018. On April 21, 2018, Syfy announced that the series had been cancelled after one season.

== Plot ==
Ghost Wars takes place in a remote Alaskan town that has been overrun by paranormal forces. The series focuses on local outcast Roman Mercer, who must overcome the town's prejudices and his own personal demons if he is to harness his repressed psychic powers and save everyone from the mass haunting that is threatening to destroy them all.

== Cast and characters ==
=== Main ===
- Avan Jogia as Roman Mercer
- Kim Coates as Billy McGrath
- Vincent D'Onofrio as Catholic Father Dan Carpenter
- Meat Loaf as Doug Rennie
- Kandyse McClure as Dr. Landis Barker, lead scientist at the LAMBDA Institute and Billy's not-so-secret lover
- Luvia Petersen as Valerie "Val" McGrath-Dufresne, Port Moore's mayor and Billy's sister

=== Recurring ===
- Elise Gatien as Maggie Rennie, Roman's friend, now a ghost and daughter of Doug Rennie, whose death still haunts her father.
- Jesse Moss as Deputy Norman "Norm" Waters, a deputy sheriff who is one of the first to believe in Roman's ghostly visions.
- Andrew Moxham as Paolo Jones, a scientist at the LAMBDA Institute, who splits his time between the institute and town with his wife.
- Sonja Bennett as Karla Kowalski-Jones, the owner of the town's local watering hole, who proves to be tougher than her husband, Paolo, thinks.
- Kristin Lehman as Marilyn McGrath-Dufresne, wife of Valerie and Port Moore's doctor whose daughters' involvement with the ghosts cause her and her wife to fight to protect their family.
- Allison James as Isabel McGrath-Dufresne, the daughter of Val and Marilyn, whose connection, along with twin sister Abigail, to the ghosts scares her parents.
- Sarah Giles as Abigail McGrath-Dufresne, the daughter of Val and Marilyn, whose connection, along with her twin sister Isabel, to the ghosts scares her parents.
- Veena Sood as Nadine Mercer, the necromancing mother of Roman, whose mysterious past still haunts her and her son.
- Sharon Taylor as Sophia Moon, the town mortician who is one of the first to believe in Roman's ghostly visions, then becomes haunted after the death of her son and fellow townspeople.
- Kathryn Kirkpatrick as Carol (aka Bake Sale Carol), the church lady who is always willing to lend a hand to help or an ear for gossip.

== Episodes ==
No.	Title	Directed by	Written by	Original release date	US viewers (millions)
1	"Death's Door"	David Von Ancken	Simon Barry	October 5, 2017	0.51
Just as troubled medium Roman Mercer prepares to leave the small town of Port Moore, an earthquake strikes the Alaskan Island and awakens a supernatural force bent on destruction. His friend turned ghost, Maggie Rennie, warns him that souls who want to move on are being stymied by something, and their ghosts will lash out at the living. Just when Sheriff Sam Perkins (Tim Guinee) realizes that Roman does see ghosts, the soul of a newly deceased local kills Sam. After three more incidents, in rapid succession, a number of townspeople acknowledge that the ghosts are real. The ghosts have destroyed the only bridge off the island.
2	"The Curse of Copperhead Road"	Leslie Hope	Simon Barry	October 12, 2017	0.51
Roguish smuggler Billy sails into Port Moore – through the bodies of numerous deceased humpback whales – to find his hometown disturbed by recent events, now including the phones being out. As he moves to distribute his latest shipment, smuggled in for research company LAMBDA Institute, his beloved boat and only escape is overtaken by a presence of his past.
3	"The Ghost in the Machine"	Leslie Hope	Damon Vignale	October 19, 2017	0.39
Pragmatic research scientist Landis Barker self-experiments to quantify the haunting of a Lambda Technologies branch in Port Moore after a particle accelerator test goes horribly wrong.
4	"The Exorcism of Marcus Moon"	Kristin Lehman	Karen Lam	October 26, 2017	0.50
As church membership flourishes, Reverend Dan soothes the anxieties of the townspeople, but when a young boy gets possessed, Dan wrestles with the thought of performing an unsanctioned exorcism.
5	"Whatever Happened to Maggie Rennie"	Michael Nankin	Rachel Langer	November 2, 2017	0.33
The town leans on skeptical and steadfast handyman Doug after Port Moore's social structure begins to collapse, but when Doug's dead daughter persuades Roman to deliver a message, Doug's well being rapidly deteriorates.
6	"We Need to Talk About Abigail"	Mathias Herndl	Sonja Bennett	November 9, 2017	0.32
As Val organizes a civil defense force to protect the town, her daughter Abigail goes missing; Billy leads the charge to find the girl, employing Roman's medium skills and anyone who is willing to set foot in the forest on the outskirts of town.
7	"Whistle Past the Graveyard"	Mathias Herndl	Dennis Heaton	November 16, 2017	0.33
A power outage sends Port Moore into a tailspin and somehow makes the ghosts stronger, prompting Roman, Billy, Landis and Dan to trek up to the dam to get the power back, but a long-buried town secret threatens to tear the group apart.
8	"Two Graves"	Kristin Lehman	Damon Vignale	November 30, 2017	0.25
With his body in critical condition, Billy's spirit becomes trapped in the nightmarish ghost realm; Roman pursues Dan, looking for answers about his mother's death.
9	"Post-Apocalypse Now"	Jason Priestley	Rachel Langer	December 7, 2017	0.39
An arrival from Lambda headquarters gives the town hope for the first time in weeks. The company distributes supplies, promising to get everyone off the island in due course. While the eccentric young CEO Daphne Vikander takes great interest in Roman, Landis suspects she has unsavory designs for the townspeople's future.
10	"The Pain Connection"	Michael Nankin	Story by : Gemma Holdway; Teleplay by : Sonja Bennet & Karen Lam	December 14, 2017	0.29
Lambda's attempts to experiment on their confiscated pod go awry when a grotesque Paolo emerges from the ghost vessel and unleashes havoc on anything in his path; a monster hunt begins.
11	"The Feast"	Jason Priestley	Damon Vignale	December 21, 2017	0.34
Landis and Billy try to make sense of the museum artifact; Norm is busy with a pregnant Karla harboring a ghost-child. Abigail's physical condition deteriorates, prompting Marilyn to finally realize that whatever is inside her daughter isn't normal.
12	"There's No More Room in Hell"	Simon Barry	Dennis Heaton	December 28, 2017	0.39
While Daphne gathers the power she needs to launch her accelerator test, civil unrest breaks out in the town when Doug kicks Winston out of the bar, a symbol of too many people making their own decisions. A mob pursues Roman, Landis, Billy and the McGrath-Dufresnes.
13	"...My Soul to Keep"	Simon Barry	Simon Barry	January 4, 2018	0.34
While the ghosts build a resistance against Roman, Port Moore survivors draw straws in preparation for their final battle, a quest to connect the two halves of the artifact in the ghost realm.

== Production ==
Filming took place in the Vancouver area, and concluded on August 31, 2017.
