= Hot Pink Shorts =

- Genre: anthology/short films
- Directed by: Nicky Forsman
- Starring: Luvia Petersen, Rob Trinh (season 1 co-hosts); Dianna David, Jonny Staub (season 2 co-hosts)
- Country of origin: Canada
- Original language: English
- No. of seasons: 2

Production
- Executive producers: Bill Allman, Brad E. Danks, James Shavick
- Producer: Samantha Sowassey
- Production locations: Vancouver, British Columbia
- Running time: 30 minutes (approx. 0.22)

Original release
- Network: OutTV
- Release: September 7, 2007 – July 14, 2009

Hot Pink Shorts is a Canadian English language anthology series comprising various LGBT related short films. Hot Pink Shorts premiered on September 13, 2007 at 8:30 pm EST on Canadian digital cable specialty channel, OutTV.

In 2012, a new series was launched titled Hot Pink Shorts: The Making Of.

== Premise ==
Each episode features a number of various LGBT related short films, ranging from dramatic, comedy, animation, among others from Canada and around the world. Viewers are encouraged to submit their own pieces of work as well. The show in partnership with the Vancouver Film School.

== Season 1 (2007) ==
The first season was hosted by Luvia Petersen and Rob Trinh and ran for 6 episodes.

Episodes

(Dates represent original day of broadcast. Name of director featured in parentheses)

1. 7 Sept 2007: "Til Death Do Us Toby" (Gina Daggett)
2. 14 Sept 2007: "Short Sight" (Kevin Kostal)
3. 21 Sept 2007:
4. 28 Sept 2007:
5. 7 Oct 2007:
6. 14 Oct 2007:

== Season 2 (2009) ==
Season 2 premiered in May 2009 with two new hosts, Dianna David and Jonny Staub. It ran for 9 new episodes.

Episodes

(Dates represent original days of broadcast)

1. 7 May 2009: "Animation" (including Sexo Explicitco 1 and 2, Operated By Invisible Hands, Yin and Falling)
2. 14 May 2009: "Australian" (including Salt, Time Will Tell and Australian Tails)
3. 21 May 2009: "Vintage" (Part 1) (including Hubby/Wifey, Pink and She Wears Cufflinks)
4. 28 May 2009: "Vintage" (Part 2) (including She Wears Cufflinks (Part 2), Overstuff and The Bond)
5. 7 June 2009: "Queer Youth" (including Different and Sugared Peas)
6. 14 June 2009: "The Park" (including Park Bench, Run to Me and Just For Leather)
7. 28 June 2009: "Director's Cut" (including The Bathroom Mirror, Is One of you Eddie?, And What Don't You Understand About "I'm Leaving...Again?")
8. 7 July 2009: "Brazilian" (Part 1) (including Something Like That and My Boyfriend is a Hustler)
9. 14 July 2009: "Brazilian" (Part 2) (including Danae and The Open Diary of R)

== Hot Pink Shorts: The Making Of ==
The series of Hot Pink Shorts: the Making Of comprised one-hour shows on Canadian OUTtv giving new gay and lesbian directors to film a short and bring their favorite story ideas into the spotlight. In an intensive 3‐month training (called "film school 101"), the chosen novice film directors are mentored by gay film industry professionals, taking them step by step through the entire production process from scripting and crewing, to casting and location scouting and post production. The directors are given a funding of Canadian $2,500 for financing the project. The actual film shooting takes place within the span of one day. The shorts realised are posted online on hotpinkshorts.com for viewing.

1. 17 May 2012 The Prince's Sword (Melissa Sky)
2. 24 May 2012
3. 31 May 2012 The Bonus (David C. Jones)
4. 7 June 2012: Just the Tip (Steve Adams and Sean Horlor)

== International broadcasters ==
- OutTV - Netherlands
