= The Exhibition =

2013 Canadian documentary film

- Directed by: Damon Vignale
- Written by: Damon Vignale
- Produced by: Damon Vignale; Miho Yamamoto
- Starring: Pamela Masik
- Cinematography: Damon Vignale
- Edited by: Daryl Bennett; Damon Vignale
- Music by: Daryl Bennett
- Production company: Jove Pictures
- Distributed by: Horizon Motion Pictures
- Release date: April 27, 2013 (Hot Docs)
- Running time: 90 minutes
- Country: Canada
- Language: English

The Exhibition is a 2013 Canadian documentary film, directed by Damon Vignale. The film profiles Pamela Masik, an artist from Vancouver, British Columbia, who faced resistance and controversy when she tried to mount a gallery show devoted to portraits of the victims of serial killer Robert Pickton and other missing women.

People appearing in the film also include Lorimer Shenher, the police detective who investigated the Pickton case.

The film premiered at the 2013 Hot Docs Canadian International Documentary Festival.

== Awards ==
Award	Date of ceremony	Category	Recipient(s)	Result	Ref(s)
Canadian Screen Awards	2015	Donald Brittain Award	Robert Straight, Damon Vignale, Miho Yamamoto	Nominated	
Canadian Screen Awards	2015	Best Direction in a Documentary Program	Damon Vignale	Nominated	
Canadian Screen Awards	2015	Best Original Music for a Non-Fiction Program or Series	Daryl Bennett	Nominated	
Canadian Screen Awards	2015	Diversity Award	Damon Vignale, Miho Yamamoto	Won	
International Emmy Awards	2014	Best Arts Programming	Damon Vignale, Miho Yamamoto	Won	
Leo Awards	2014	Best Feature Length Documentary Program	Damon Vignale, Miho Yamamoto, Robert Straight	Nominated	
Leo Awards	2014	Best Direction in a Documentary Program or Series	Damon Vignale	Won	
Leo Awards	2014	Best Cinematography in a Documentary Program or Series	Damon Vignale	Nominated	
Leo Awards	2014	Best Picture Editing in a Documentary Program or Series	Daryl Bennett, Damon Vignale	Won	
Leo Awards	2014	Best Musical Score in a Documentary Program or Series	Daryl Bennett	Nominated	
Leo Awards	2014	Best Overall Sound in a Documentary Program or Series	Randy Kiss, Dennis McCormack	Won	
