= The Falling (1998 film) =

- Directed by: Raul Sanchez Inglis
- Written by: Raul Sanchez Inglis; Simon Barry
- Produced by: Greg Malcolm; Vicki Sotheran
- Starring: Christopher Shyer; Nicole Oliver; Rob Lee
- Cinematography: Gregory Middleton
- Edited by: Kelly Herron
- Music by: Chris Ainscough
- Production company: Sodona Entertainment
- Distributed by: Domino Film & Television
- Release date: July 29, 1998
- Running time: 94 minutes
- Country: Canada
- Language: English

The Falling is a Canadian thriller drama film, directed by Raul Sanchez Inglis and released in 1998. The film centres on a love triangle between Lars (Christopher Shyer), Karis (Nicole Oliver) and Morgan (Rob Lee).

The film unfolds in three segments, each representing one of their own perspectives. Lars meets Karis in a bar and takes her home for a night of passionate and uninhibited sex before Karis's jealous ex-husband Morgan arrives the next morning; Morgan sees himself as a gentle, loving man who is wounded by his wife's extramarital affairs; Karis envisions herself as an indecisive woman torn between two relationships with men she's not sure she loves. The film's triptych structure, with its shifting perspectives on how each of the three characters perceives the reality of the situation, was compared by critics to Rashomon, Run Lola Run and The Red Violin.

The film received a special industry screening in Vancouver on July 29, 1998, before having its official public premiere at the 1998 Toronto International Film Festival in September. It went into commercial release in 1999.

== Critical response ==
The film was not well received by critics. Liam Lacey of The Globe and Mail called it "little more than a slick erotic thriller featuring model-pretty actors, who would be right at home on a U.S. adult cable station."

For the Toronto Star, Norman Wilner wrote that "in the end, it's left to cinematographer Gregory Middleton to redeem the picture as best he can. His formal compositions and atmospheric lighting give The Falling a big-screen sheen that obscures its movie-of-the-week turgidity."

Finbarr O'Reilly of the National Post was more positive, writing that "the film, shot in Vancouver, is veiled in shadows, and the ongoing rain, thunder and lightning often makes the sinister atmosphere feel like a bludgeon (Karis' bouffant hairdo and chunky earrings also make her look more like a middle-aged Rosedale matron than the funky urban chick she's meant to be). Still, it works in certain scenes where the saturated colours, muted trip-hop music and slow-motion camera work merge to symbolize the labyrinthine tunnels of the mind explored by the film."

== Awards ==
Middleton received a Genie Award nomination for Best Cinematography at the 19th Genie Awards in 1999.
