= Lost After Dark =

2015 film directed by Ian Kessner

- Directed by: Ian Kessner
- Written by: Ian Kessner; Bo Ransdell
- Produced by: Eric Gozlan
- Starring: Robert Patrick
- Cinematography: Curtis Petersen
- Edited by: Ron Wisman
- Music by: Eric Allaman
- Production company: Goldrush Entertainment
- Distributed by: Anchor Bay Films
- Release date: August 21, 2015
- Running time: 89 minutes
- Country: Canada
- Language: English

Lost After Dark is a 2015 Canadian horror film starring Robert Patrick about a group of Michigan teens who stumble upon the lair of a suspected cannibal.

== Plot ==
In 1977 Michigan, a man is attacked in his farmhouse and urges a young woman to flee. She is captured by a deranged man who kills her gruesomely.

Seven years later, in 1984, high school student Adrienne prepares for a weekend getaway after the Spring Ball. She is still mourning her mother and her missing sister. Adrienne and several friends—including Jamie, Sean, Wesley, Tobe, Marilyn, Heather, and Johnnie—steal a school bus and drive into the countryside, running out of gas near the old Joad farmhouse.

The group explores the property and finds evidence of a cannibalistic family who once lived there. Adrienne recognizes her sister's necklace among a shrine of human bones. One by one, the teenagers are killed by the disfigured Joad son, "Junior", in escalating brutality: Adrienne is pickaxed, Sean is stabbed, Heather and Johnnie die in the barn, and others are trapped, impaled, or crushed.

Vice Principal Cunningham and Adrienne's father arrive separately to search for the missing students. Cunningham is decapitated after confronting the killer. Adrienne's father ultimately shoots Junior when he attacks the last survivor, Jamie.

Police later identify the killer as Junior Joad, the lone survivor of a feral cannibal clan thought dead years earlier. As Jamie is taken away in an ambulance, the coroner's van is found wrecked—Junior has escaped again. The film ends with Jamie's scream as the cycle of horror resumes.

== Cast ==
- Elise Gatien as Jamie
- Eve Harlow as Marilyn
- Alexander Calvert as Johnnie
- Jesse Camacho as Tobe
- Stephan James as Wesley
- Justin Kelly as Sean
- Lanie McAuley as Heather
- Kendra Leigh Timmins as Adrienne
- Mark Wiebe as Junior Joad
- Robert Patrick as Mr. C
- David Lipper as Adrienne's Father
- Sarah Fisher as Laurie
- Rick Rosenthal as Sheriff
- Mike Dagostino as Deputy

== Filming ==
Lost After Dark was filmed at locations around Greater Sudbury and Parry Sound, Ontario.
