= Cult (TV series) =

- Genre: Mystery; Psychological thriller; Horror
- Created by: Rockne S. O'Bannon
- Starring: Matthew Davis; Jessica Lucas; Alona Tal; Robert Knepper
- Composer: Tim Jones
- Country of origin: United States
- Original language: English
- No. of seasons: 1
- No. of episodes: 13

Production
- Executive producers: Jason Ensler; Josh Schwartz; Steven Rae; Stephanie Savage; Len Goldstein; Rockne S. O'Bannon
- Producer: John B. Moranville
- Production locations: Vancouver, British Columbia, Canada
- Cinematography: Robert Gantz
- Editors: Matt Barber; Kevin Mock
- Running time: 42 minutes
- Production companies: Rockne S. O'Bannon Television; Fake Empire; CBS Television Studios; Warner Bros. Television

Original release
- Network: The CW
- Release: February 19 – July 12, 2013

Cult is an American mystery psychological thriller television series created by Rockne S. O'Bannon that ran on The CW from February 19 to July 12, 2013. The series centers on a journalist blogger and a production assistant, who investigate a series of mysterious disappearances that are linked to a popular television series named Cult.

On February 27, 2013, The CW announced that starting March 8 Cult would air on Fridays at 9:00 pm Eastern/8:00 pm Central. On April 10, 2013, Cult was canceled and removed from the schedule. The CW began airing the six remaining episodes on June 28, 2013.

== Plot ==
The series follows Jeff (Matthew Davis), a journalist blogger, and Skye (Jessica Lucas), a production researcher on a popular television crime series called Cult, as they investigate the fans of the series, who could be re-creating the crimes committed on the series.

== Cast and characters ==
=== Main ===
- Matthew Davis as Jeffrey Dean "Jeff" Sefton, a journalist blogger.
- Jessica Lucas as Skye Yarrow, a production assistant.
- Alona Tal as Marti Gerritsen, an actress playing Kelly Collins on a show called Cult.
- Robert Knepper as Roger Reeves, an actor playing Billy Grimm on a show called Cult.

=== Recurring ===
- Marie Avgeropoulos as Kirstie
- Christian Cooper as Andy
- Aisha Hinds as Det. Roslyn Sakelik
- Stacey Farber as E.J.
- Ben Hollingsworth as Peter Grey
- Jeffrey Pierce as Stuart Reynolds
- Kadeem Hardison as Paz

== Production ==
Cult was originally supposed to air on the now defunct network, The WB. When The WB was replaced by The CW, the executives of The CW at that time dropped the show, which was supposed to star Matthew Bomer. In January 2012, a revised version of the series was revived on The CW with a pilot order. The series was created by Rockne S. O'Bannon, who also serves as executive producer alongside Josh Schwartz, Stephanie Savage, Len Goldstein and the production companies Warner Bros. Television and Fake Empire.

Jessica Lucas was cast in the lead role of Skye Yarrow in February 2012, a young production assistant who teams with a journalist blogger to investigate the fans of a popular television series entitled Cult. Alona Tal was cast next as Marti Gerritsen, the actress playing the role of Kelly Collins in the fictional series Cult. Robert Knepper then followed in the role of Roger Reeves, the actor playing the role of Billy Grimm in the show-within-a-show. Matthew Davis was cast in the lead role of Jeff Sefton, the journalist blogger working with Skye and Andrew Leeds was cast in the recurring role of Kyle Segal, the executive working on the show-within-a-show. Ben Hollingsworth will also have a recurring role, as associate producer Peter Grey. Stacey Farber joined the series in a recurring role as E.J. a tech-savvy girl, who works with Jeff and helps him in the search for his sibling.

The pilot was officially picked up by The CW on May 11, 2012.

About the show's reception, Rockne S. O'Bannon said: "It was such an unusual piece of material, and for better or for worse, such a singular vision piece that the network and the studio were very respectful of what I wanted to do with it. I'm very proud of this show because, though it went nowhere very quickly, it was very well received."

Star Matt Davis blames Cult being canceled on marketing and jokingly express his frustration over the announcement on Twitter:"Good news Cult fans! Cult has been renewed for the next ten season due to its brilliant marketing campaign! Good job everyone." and then added "It was a wonderful learning experience, and exciting misadventure."

About the show cancelation, Jessica Lucas said: "That show was never supposed to be just a thirteen-episode show. It opened up a ton of questions in the first season and you never get to find out what happened. But this is the nature of it and I don’t do things for results, I do things for experience. I really wanted to stay in that role and I really wanted to stay involved in that world and I can’t control whether people see it or how it went. I would have liked to do more of it – it just obviously didn’t turn out that way."

== Episodes ==
No.	Title	Directed by	Written by	Original release date	Prod. code	U.S. viewers (millions)
1	"You're Next"	Jason Ensler	Rockne S. O'Bannon	February 19, 2013	276055	0.86
When Nate Sefton goes missing, his brother, Jeff, a tarnished reporter, searches for him. Jeff discovers that Nate's disappearance is somehow tied to the underground following of a show on TV called Cult. He joins forces with Skye Yarrow, a research assistant on the TV show, and they soon discover that a secret group of fans may be responsible for a series of murders and abductions. Meanwhile on the TV series, FBI Agent Kelly Collins closes in on the men who abducted her sister and her nephew on the orders of the leader of Cult himself, Billy Grimm.
2	"In the Blood"	Sam Hill	Rockne S. O'Bannon	February 26, 2013	3X7702	0.82
Jeff and Skye continue their investigation into Nate's disappearance as well as try to establish a connection between him and the TV series where Jeff recruits a computer hacker, named E.J., to help with tracing Nate's last phone call. On the TV series, Kelly continues to investigate Billy's followers when one suspected former member of the group is found murdered after being buried alive from the head down. In the real world, Jeff and Skye learn that Detective Sakelik is connected to the shadowy group when they see her interacting with the widower of the group's latest victim, and the group now focus their attention to Roger Reeves, the actor playing Billy Grimm on Cult. Also, Skye reveals to Jeff her personal reasons for helping him: to find out what happened to her father, a journalist who disappeared 10 years ago while investigating Steven Rae, the shadowy writer and creator of the Cult TV series.
3	"Being Billy"	James L. Conway	Megan Martin	March 8, 2013	3X7703	0.68
Jeff finds a surprise visitor in Nate's apartment, Laura, Nate's girlfriend, who is also looking for Nate. Jeff learns from Laura that Nate was hosting a dangerous On College Campus game, while E.J. finds out that Nate himself has been active on the Internet. Jeff and Skye embark on a journey to find Nate's hiding place, but find more than they bargained for when the truth about the 'Games' and the 'True Believers' are revealed. Meanwhile, the True Believers' emissary, Kirstie, invites herself to the set of Cult to make contact with Roger whom is both fascinated and disturbed by her antics. On the TV series, Kelly tries to make a connection between a victim hit by a train to Billy Grimm's cult.
4	"Get with the Program"	Rob Hardy	Craig Gore & Tim Walsh	March 15, 2013	3X7704	0.72
A woman reaches out to Jeff in a "Cult" chat room. Her husband disappeared under similar circumstances as both Nate and Skye's father, and she wants to meet and work together. Skye and Jeff wait for the woman in the meeting place. Meanwhile, a man, Terrence, watches them to see if they are true believers or not. Jeff's mystery date, Anya, hired Terrence to find her husband, Romy. When Terrence deems that Jeff is not a True Believer, Anya joins the group. She has Romy's notebook, exactly like Nate's, and Skye finds the same mystery CD in it. The four go looking for Romy and Nate in a fan club and later, in the studio.
5	"The Kiss"	Tim Hunter	Story by : David Kemper; Teleplay by : Lindsay Jewett Sturman	March 22, 2013	3X7705	0.73
Jeff discovers a photo of Nate with a guy named Dustin. Jeff goes to visit Dustin, only to find his mom, who does not have anything nice to say about her son. She just knows that he has joined a "new religion" and knows that he is going to "some party" in the Cult studio. Skye brings Jeff as her date to the party to investigate Dustin, but finds someone more interesting, Sakelik. Meanwhile, Roger Reeves and his girlfriend, Kirstie, make a new friend.
6	"The Good Fight"	Martha Coolidge	Megan Lynn & Wade Solomon	March 29, 2013	3X7706	0.54
Skye has a serious reaction to the drug that was slipped into her drink. Detective Sakelik comes to the hospital but refuses to help save Skye in which Jeff tries to find a cure before Skye dies.
7	"Suffer the Children"	Nathan Hope	Megan Martin	April 5, 2013	3X7707	0.62
E.J. gives Jeff a copy of Sakelik's police personnel file which reveals that Sakelik was taken into custody by Child Protective Services 25 years ago after being found with other abandoned children at a house in Arrow Head. Jeff and Skye locate the house and question the owner. Sakelik tracks Jeff and Skye to the house and they barely escape with their lives. On the TV series, Kelly finds a lock of Meadow's hair in the trunk of Billy's car.
8	"The Devil You Know"	Marita Grabiak	Hans Tobeason	June 28, 2013	3X7708	0.51
While working with Jeff to find a way to blackmail Detective Sakelik into helping them find his brother, Skye takes time out to meet with her mother. Meanwhile, Stuart tries to draw Roger closer to him by inviting him to a weekend getaway. On the show, Kelly must strike a devil's bargain with Billy to get Meadow back.
9	"Off to See the Wizard"	Thomas Wright	Story by : Craig Gore & Tim Walsh; Teleplay by : Rockne S. O'Bannon	June 28, 2013	3X7709	0.44
When Jeff and Skye learn of a secret meeting for True Believer initiates, Skye sets out to infiltrate the group. Unfortunately, Jeff is lured away by a decoy, leaving Skye on her own. While Jeff races to locate Skye before her cover is blown, she and the group meet a man claiming to be the TV show's creator Steven Rae, but she soon finds out that he is not. Meanwhile on the show, Kelly tries to locate Meadow's son Andy who has run away since leaving Billy.
10	"The Prophecy of St. Clare"	Matt Barber	Lindsay Jewett Sturman	July 5, 2013	3X7710	0.62
Jeff and Skye visit the mother of Edie, the actress who plays Meadow on the show, after she is startled by two on-set figurines that reminds her of ones she saw in her childhood. Meanwhile, Peter continues to spy on Skye, while on the TV series, Billy grows increasingly more deranged as his obsession over Kelly intensifies.
11	"Flip the Script"	Leslie Libman	Rockne S. O'Bannon & Hans Tobeason	July 5, 2013	3X7711	0.43
Still evading the dreaded True Believers, Jeff and Skye try to meet with Dr. Kimble and speak with his assistant, Allegra. When they discover the lab has been ransacked, they try to discover the connection between Kimble's manuscript and Killian's which may be the inspiration for the TV show. Later, the pair investigate Stuart's production office near the Cult set. On the show, Kelly checks on her sister and remembers that they both witnessed their parents' murder.
12	"1987"	Allan Kroeker	Hans Tobeason	July 12, 2013	3X7712	0.54
Stuart, the leader of the True Believers, forces the captive Nate to decipher Killian's message, and Nate asks Allegra to try to contact Jeff if she can escape. Meanwhile, Jeff and Skye remain in hiding to avoid the True Believers. On the show, Billy captures the killer of Kelly's parents, hoping to weaken her resolve.
13	"Executive Producer Steven Rae"	Nathan Hope	Rockne S. O'Bannon	July 12, 2013	3X7713	0.40
While the Cult cast and crew prepare for a special live filming of the season finale, Jeff makes a deal with Stuart for answers hoping that he will release Nate. Meanwhile, in the show itself, Billy engineers Kelly's confrontation with the man who killed her parents. Edie arrives on the set to view the filming of the season final as she plans her own move against Roger Reeves. With the help of Nate, Jeff manages to score his brother's release and Stuart ends up being arrested. On the set, Edie places a live bullet round in a prop gun to be used against Roger/Billy who ends up getting shot. In the final scene, Jeff, Nate, and Skye finally come face to face with the show's shadowy creator Steven Rae, and his true identity is someone that not even Skye had expected; Steven Rae is Skye's long-missing father.
