= Christopher Shyer =

Canadian-American actor

- Born: September 18, 1967 (age 58); Canada
- Other name: Chris Shyer
- Occupation: Actor
- Years active: 1994-present

Christopher Shyer (sometimes credited as Chris Shyer) is a Canadian-American actor who has appeared in over 100 film and television roles.

== Acting career ==
Shyer has appeared in multiple guest roles on television since 1994, including: Viper, The New Outer Limits, Smallville, Monk, JAG, CSI: Miami, CSI: Crime Scene Investigation, and a critically acclaimed recurring role as the Hannibal Lecter-like character "Lawrence O'Malley" in The Practice. He more recently appeared in a supporting role on ABC-TV's re-imagined V series as "Marcus," second-in-command to the V high commander, Anna (Morena Baccarin).

His varied film roles have included The Falling (1998, as "Lars"), The Invitation (2003, as "Joel Gellman"), The Lazarus Child (2004, as "John Boyd"), Fierce People (2005, as "Dr. Leffler"), and Big Bad Wolf (2006, as "Charlie Cowley").

He has also starred on Broadway as Sam Carmichael in Mamma Mia and Dean Newhouse in Going Down Swingin’, following successful stints in the Canadian productions of Miss Saigon, Les Misérables (as Joly & understudy Marius Pontmercy), The Phantom of the Opera (as Raoul, Vicomte de Chagny), Assassins (as John Wilkes Booth), and Sunset Boulevard (as Artie Green). He also played four supporting roles in the US tour of The Book of Mormon and Governor John Slaton in the 2025 US tour of Parade.

== Filmography ==
=== Film ===
Year	Title	Role	Notes
1994	Janek: The Silent Betrayal	Dancer	Television movie
1998	Voyage of Terror	Ship's Officer #2	Television movie
1998	The Falling	Lars	
1999	Little Boy Blues	Daniel	
2000	G-Saviour	Barkeep	Television movie
2000	Cinderella: Single Again	Prince Charming	
2000	The Operative	Albright	
2001	A Girl Thing	Rick	Television movie
2001	The Unprofessionals	Marlon Carlson	
2001	Along Came a Spider	Jim	
2001	Kiss My Act	Tommy	Television movie
2002	Life or Something Like It	Mark Laughlin	
2003	Before I Say Goodbye	Adam Cauliff / Harry Reynolds	Television movie
2003	The Invitation	Joel Gellman	Leo Award for Best Lead Performance – Male
2003	The Core	Dave Perry	
2003	Behind the Camera: The Unauthorized Story of Three's Company	Alan Hamel	Television movie
2003	See Grace Fly	Bathroom Transvestite	
2003	Phenomenon II	George Malley	Television movie
2004	Traffic	Home Owner	Television movie
2004	The Lazarus Child	John Boyd	
2005	Fierce People	Dr. Leffler	
2009	Killer Hair	Boyd Radford	Television movie
2011	The True Heroines	Mayor Fitzgerald	
2011	J. Edgar	Richard Nixon	
2011	Maybe Tomorrow	Senator Monty Clemens	
2012	Big Time Movie	Agent Lane	Television movie
2018	Curry Western	Simon	
2023	Cat Person	Ernie	
2023	Friends & Family Christmas	Luke McCalan	Television movie
2024	Family Practice Mysteries: Coming Home	Leonard Alexander	Television movie
2024	From Embers	Dr. Morgan	
2024	Three Wiser Men and a Boy	Roy	Television movie (Hallmark)
2024	Leah's Perfect Gift	Mitchell Westwood (Graham's Dad)	Television movie (Hallmark)
2024	Happy Howlidays	Jim Park	Television movie (Hallmark)

=== Television ===
Year	Title	Role	Notes
1997	Riverdale	Ben MacKenzie	Unknown episodes
1998	Viper	Elliott Peoples	Episode: "Paper Trail"
1998	The Crow: Stairway to Heaven	Drew Kessler	Episode: "Solitude's Revenge"
1998	The New Addams Family	Vlad	Episode: "Deadbeat Relatives"
1999	The New Addams Family	Governor	Episode: "The Tale of Long John Addams"
1999	Night Man	Pentacost [sic?]	Episode: "Sixty Minute Man"
1999	First Wave	Lon	Episode: "All About Eddie"
1999	Cold Squad	Dr. Ben Walker	Episode: "Death, A Love Story"
2000	Higher Ground	Bob	Episode: "World Apart"
2000	The Outer Limits	Harold Zimmer	Episode: "Seeds of Destruction"
2000	Nuremberg	General Telford Taylor	Episode: "#1.1"
2000	Relic Hunter	Jason Clark	Episode: "Last of the Mochicas"
2001	Seven Days	Caesar Gustaf	Episode: "Sugar Mountain"
2001	The Chris Isaak Show	Brian Bulander	Episode: "Wages of Fear"
2002	The Practice	Lawrence O'Malley	3 episodes
2002	Monk	Carl	2 episodes
2003	Jake 2.0	Abdul Tiranzi	Episode: "Training Day"
2003	Smallville	Nicholas Convoy	Episode: "Slumber"
2004	The Days	Scott Eaton	4 episodes
2004	JAG	Commander Steve Lundt	Episode: "One Big Boat"
2005	The L Word	Rod Sebring	Episode: "Loyal"
2005	Cold Squad	Miles Larson	2 episodes
2005	CSI: Miami	Larry Musgrave	Episode: "Whacked"
2005	NCIS	Kyle Boone	Episode: "Mind Games"
2006	Without a Trace	Ken Robinson	Episode: "The Stranger"
2006	Kyle XY	Brad	Episode: "The Lies That Bind"
2006–2007	Whistler	Adrian Varland	26 episodes
2007	Falcon Beach	Bobby Tanner	Episode: "Sins of the Father"
2008–2014	Canooks	Richard Reddick	16 episodes
2009–2011	V	Marcus	21 episodes
2010	CSI: Crime Scene Investigation	Bill	Episode: "Lost & Found"
2011	Lights Out	The Dentist	Episode: "Pilot"
2011	Endgame	Gareth Hart	Episode: "Opening Moves"
2011	The Good Wife	Dr. Dominic Lawton	Episode: "In Sickness"
2011	Combat Hospital	Colonel Axelquist	Episode: "Reckless"
2012	Good God	Tony Cassano	8 episodes
2017	Tin Star	Dermot O'Hanrahan	Episode: "This Be the Verse"
2018	Instinct	Sebastian Trevor	Episode: "Wild Game"
2018	Blue Bloods	Martin Post	Episode: "The Devil You Know"
2019	The Blacklist	ATF DA Charleston	Episode: "The Cryptobanker (No. 160)"
2019	Madam Secretary	FBI Director Frank Meredith	Episode: "Better Angels"
2019	Two Sentence Horror Stories	Doug	Episode: "Squirm"
2020	FBI: Most Wanted	George Locke	Episode: "Ride or Die"
2021	Debris	Richard Hegman	Episode: "Solar Winds"
2021	Chesapeake Shores	Robert Lewis	2 episodes
2022	Paper Girls	Ozzie Brandman	2 episodes
2023	The Night Agent	Vice President Redfield	Recurring
2023	Riverdale	Brad Rayberry	2 episodes
2023	Bookie	Patrick Ryan	Episode: "Beware the Family Jewels"
2025	Family Law	Christian Keller	Episode: "Knowing Me, Knowing You"
2026	Tracker	Dr. Brett Hooper	Episode: "Do No Harm"
