= Jessica Lucas =

Canadian actress (born 1985)

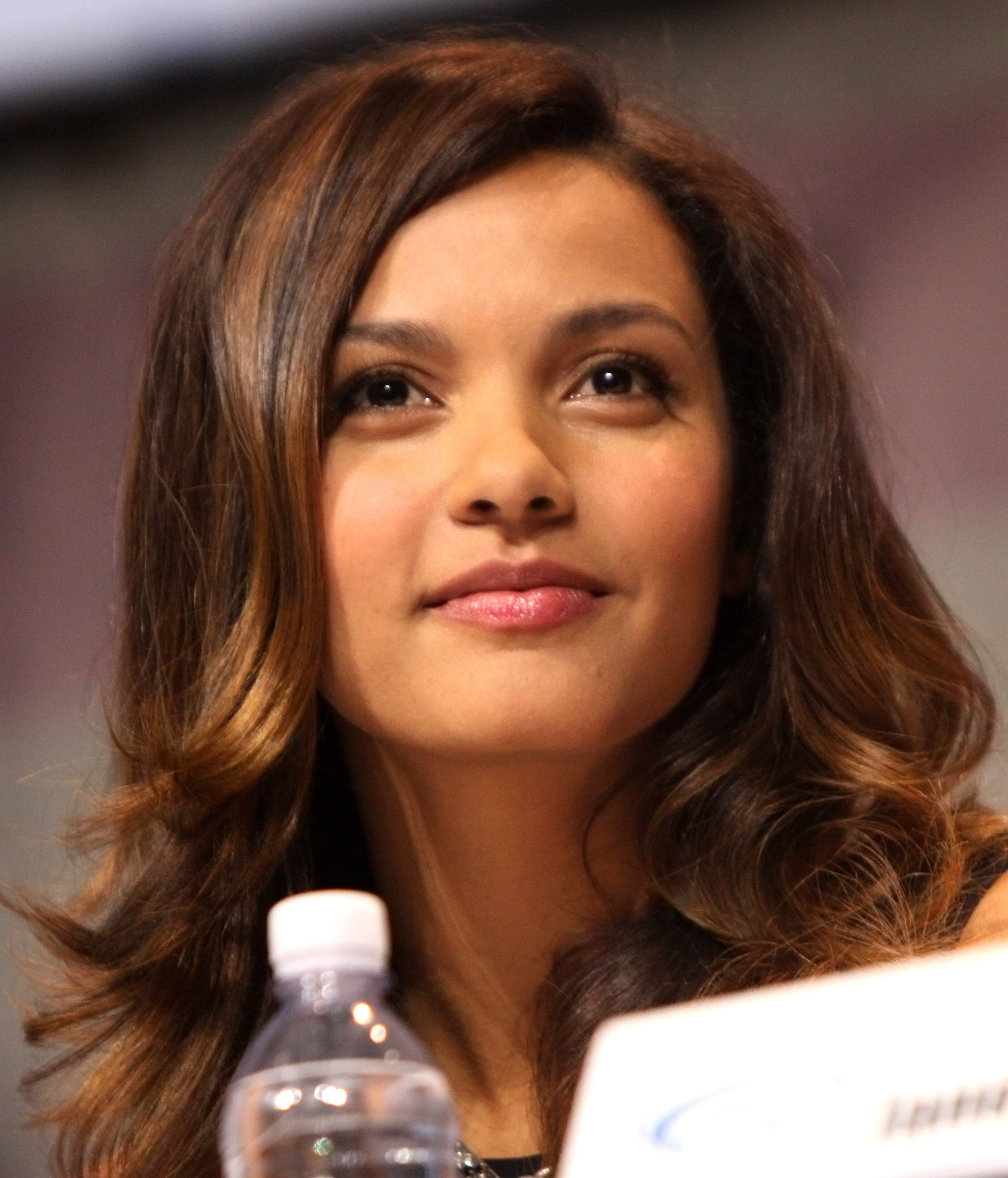
- Lucas in 2013
- Born: September 24, 1985 (age 40); Vancouver, British Columbia, Canada
- Occupation: Actress
- Years active: 2000–present
- Children: 2

Jessica Lucas (born September 24, 1985) is a Canadian actress. She is known for her roles in television, such as The Resident, Edgemont, Melrose Place, Cult, and Gotham, and in the films The Covenant, Cloverfield and the 2013 Evil Dead. She also starred in the music video for Coldplay's 2014 single "True Love".

== Early life ==
Lucas was born and raised in Vancouver, British Columbia. Her father is Black Canadian, and her mother is European Canadian. She began acting at seven years old, and trained with the Children's Arts Theatre School in Toronto. She started her career appearing in stage productions, including local productions of Snow White & The Seven Dwarfs, Grease, Cinderella, Mousetrap and Music Medley.

== Career ==
In 2001, she joined the Canadian teen drama television series Edgemont as recurring character Bekka Lawrence, later becoming a series regular on the show, which she remained through the end of the show's run in 2005. She was also a series regular on another Canadian television series, YTV's short-lived 2030 CE in 2002.

She guest starred in an episode of The L Word as Roxanne in 2004. She went on to appear as a series regular in the short-lived ABC teen drama series Life as We Know It as Sue; the series which ran for just one season. In 2006, she appeared in the film She's the Man and co-starred in The Covenant. She was cast in another ABC television pilot, Secrets of a Small Town, though it was not picked up to series.

In 2007, she joined the cast of CSI: Crime Scene Investigation playing the recurring character of Ronnie Lake. Despite appearing in four episodes, rumours were denied that she would be a permanent replacement for Sara Sidle. The character was written out of the series with no explanation. She also appeared in a made-for-television film Split Decision.

In 2008, she guest starred as Kimberly MacIntyre in four episodes of The CW's 90210. She also starred in a leading role as Lily in J. J. Abrams Cloverfield, which was a box office success and was well received by critics. She was cast as Lisa in the film Amusement in 2006; the film was set to be released theatrically by New Line Cinema, but after a negative reaction it was released instead straight-to-DVD in 2009. The same year, Lucas was announced to have signed on as Riley Richmond, one of the lead roles in another CW television series Melrose Place, a follow-up to the popular 1990s series of the same name.

Lucas was part of the main cast of the NBC sitcom Friends with Benefits, which aired during the summer of 2011 before being cancelled. In 2011, she played Haley in Big Mommas: Like Father, Like Son, where she showcased her singing talents as well as her acting skills.

In 2012, Lucas was cast as the lead character, Skye Yarrow, in the CW series Cult, which was filmed in the spring of 2012. In 2012, she was cast in a main role in the 2013 remake of the classic horror film The Evil Dead. In 2014, Lucas appeared in Pompeii directed by Paul W. S. Anderson.

From 2015 to 2019, she has had a regular role in Fox's Gotham as Tabitha Galavan. In 2019, Lucas played the starring role of Kate Jameson in the Canadian crime drama television series The Murders which aired on Citytv. In late 2020, she was cast in the regular role of Billie in the fourth season of the Fox medical drama television series The Resident.

== Personal life ==
In April 2017, Lucas announced her engagement to butcher Alex Jermasek. They have since married and are the parents of two children.

== Filmography ==
=== Film ===
Year	Title	Role	Notes
2006	She's the Man	Yvonne	
2006	The Covenant	Kate Tunney	
2008	Cloverfield	Lily Ford	
2008	Amusement	Lisa Swan	
2011	Big Mommas: Like Father, Like Son	Haley Robinson	
2013	Evil Dead	Olivia	
2014	That Awkward Moment	Vera Walker	
2014	Pompeii	Ariadne	

=== Television ===
Year	Title	Role	Notes
2000	Seven Days	Rita	Episode: "The Backstepper's Apprentice"
2001	Halloweentown II: Kalabar's Revenge	Cindy	Television film
2001–2005	Edgemont	Bekka Lawrence	Recurring role (seasons 2–3); main role (seasons 4–5); 40 episodes
2001	The Sausage Factory	Haley	Episode: "Dances with Squirrels"
2002–2003	2030 CE	Jakki Kaan	Main role
2002	Damaged Care	Tasha Peeno	Television film
2003	Romeo!	Jessica	Episode: "Slam Dunk"
2004	The L Word	Roxanne	Episode: "Losing It"
2004–2005	Life as We Know It	Sue Miller	Main role
2007	CSI: Crime Scene Investigation	Ronnie Lake	4 episodes
2008	90210	Kimberly McIntyre	4 episodes
2009–2010	Melrose Place	Riley Richmond	Main role
2011	Friends with Benefits	Riley Elliott	Main role
2011	Psych	Lilly Jenkins	Episode: "Last Night Gus"
2013	Cult	Skye Yarrow	Main role
2014	Gracepoint	Renee Clemons	Main role
2015–2019	Gotham	Tabitha Galavan	Main role (seasons 2–5)
2019	The Murders	Kate Jameson	Main role
2021–2023	The Resident	Billie Sutton	Main role (seasons 4–6)
