= V (2009 TV series) =

American science fiction television series (2009–2011)

- Genre: Science fiction; Drama
- Created by: Kenneth Johnson
- Based on: V by Kenneth Johnson
- Developed by: Scott Peters
- Starring: Elizabeth Mitchell; Morris Chestnut; Joel Gretsch; Logan Huffman; Lourdes Benedicto; Laura Vandervoort; Charles Mesure; Morena Baccarin; Scott Wolf
- Composer: Marco Beltrami
- Country of origin: United States
- Original language: English
- No. of seasons: 2
- No. of episodes: 22 (list of episodes)

Production
- Executive producers: Scott Rosenbaum; Scott Peters; Jace Hall; Yves Simoneau; Steve Pearlman
- Production locations: Vancouver, British Columbia, Canada
- Editor: Geofrey Hildrew
- Running time: 42 minutes
- Production companies: The Scott Peters Company (season 1); HDFilms; Warner Bros. Television

Original release
- Network: ABC
- Release: November 3, 2009 – March 15, 2011

Related
- V (1983 miniseries); V: The Final Battle; V (1984 TV series)

V is an American science-fiction drama television series that aired for two seasons on ABC, from November 3, 2009, to March 15, 2011. A remake of the 1983 miniseries created by Kenneth Johnson, the new series chronicles the arrival on Earth of a technologically advanced alien species, which ostensibly comes in peace, but actually has sinister motives. V stars Elizabeth Mitchell and Morena Baccarin, and was executive produced by Scott Rosenbaum, Yves Simoneau, Scott Peters, Steve Pearlman, and Jace Hall. The series was produced by The Scott Peters Company, HDFilms and Warner Bros. Television. On May 13, 2011, ABC cancelled it after two seasons.

== Premise ==
Giant spaceships appear over 29 major cities throughout the world, and Anna (Morena Baccarin), the beautiful and charismatic leader of the extraterrestrial "Visitors", declares that they come in peace. The Visitors claim to only need a small amount of Earth's resources, in exchange for which they will share their advanced technological and medical knowledge. As small numbers of humans begin to doubt the sincerity of the seemingly benevolent Visitors, FBI counterterrorism agent Erica Evans (Elizabeth Mitchell) discovers that the aliens are actually reptilian humanoids wearing pseudo-human skin, who have spent decades infiltrating human governments, businesses, and religious institutions, and are now in the final stages of their plan to take over the Earth. Erica joins the resistance movement, which includes Ryan (Morris Chestnut), a Visitor sleeper agent who over time developed human emotions and now wants to save humanity. Their rebellion becomes a part of a larger "Fifth Column" movement of both humans and Visitors opposed to Anna's vague, but seemingly menacing, plans for Earth and humanity, but their efforts are challenged, as the Visitors have won favor among the people of Earth by curing a variety of diseases, and have recruited Earth's youth – including Erica's son Tyler (Logan Huffman) – to serve them unknowingly as spies.

Season	Episodes	Originally released	
Season	Episodes	First released	Last released
1	12	November 3, 2009	May 18, 2010
2	10	January 4, 2011	March 15, 2011

== Cast and characters ==
=== Main cast ===
Original characters from left to right: Jack Landry, Valerie Stevens, Tyler Evans, Erica Evans, Anna, Chad Decker, and Ryan Nichols

- Elizabeth Mitchell as Erica Evans: an FBI counterterrorism agent who becomes the leader of the global Fifth Column. Erica seems to become closer to the Visitor Lisa than to her son, Tyler.
- Morris Chestnut as Ryan Nichols: a Visitor posing as human and a Fifth Columnist trying to undermine the insidious plans of the Visitors. He is later forced to betray the Fifth Column due to Anna holding his baby daughter hostage. He is strangled to death by his daughter while trying to remove her from the Visitor mothership in the season-two finale.
- Joel Gretsch as Father Jack Landry: a Catholic priest and former U.S. Army chaplain with two tours in Iraq, whose unease with the Visitors is soon validated by his alliance with Erica over their discovery of the Visitors' secret. Over time, he finds his views of the Visitors conflict with the church hierarchy. He is eventually laicized after speaking out against the Visitors one time too many, following numerous warnings from the Visitor-controlled Vatican.
- Logan Huffman as Tyler Evans: Erica's teenage son who becomes a V "peace ambassador" and Lisa's love interest. He becomes closer to Anna over time, and at odds with his own mother. The Visitors stripped him of half of his DNA when he was in Erica's womb, which led to his father believing that Erica had an affair. He is killed by Lisa's "twin" sister after mating with her in the season-two finale.
- Lourdes Benedicto as Valerie Stevens (season 1): Ryan's fiancée, who was originally unaware of his alien nature. Her discovery of his secret leads to her being murdered by Anna after giving birth to Ryan's baby.
- Laura Vandervoort as Lisa: a Visitor and Tyler's love interest, who is revealed to be Anna's daughter and next in line to be the Visitors' queen. She displays growing human emotion throughout the first season and joins the Fifth Column in the season finale. Lisa is shown to be closer to Erica than to her own mother; she often confides in Erica about her emotions, and Erica comforts her. In the second-season finale, she is imprisoned by Anna and replaced by her sister, who is identical in appearance (also played by Laura Vandervoort).
- Charles Mesure as Kyle Hobbes (recurring season 1, starring season 2): a former British SAS soldier and current mercenary, on top of the wanted lists of many law-enforcement organizations who the Fifth Column recruits. The Visitors are revealed to have someone close to him and are blackmailing him.
- Morena Baccarin as Anna: the cold, diabolically manipulative Visitor queen and high commander. She maintains loyalty and control over her subjects by use of a telepathic pacification process known as "Bliss".
- Scott Wolf as Chad Decker: a television news anchor who becomes the Visitors' spokesperson. He is caught between his journalistic ethics and his ambition when his exclusive access to Anna comes with a price. He turns Fifth Column when he learns the sinister truth about the Visitors, though this remains hidden from Anna until the season-two finale.

=== Supporting cast ===
- Christopher Shyer as Marcus: Anna's second-in-command in charge of operations. He is shot in the second season during the Concordia announcements, but has since recovered.
- Mark Hildreth as Joshua: the physician in charge of the medical crew on board the Visitors' New York mothership. In season one, he appears loyal to Anna, but is, in fact, a Fifth Columnist undermining the Visitors' operations from within. After being killed and revived, he awakens in season two with a wiped memory and renewed loyalty to Anna. At the end of season two, he remembers being in Fifth Column after seeing Lisa snoop around on the mothership, and rejoins the network against Anna.
- David Richmond-Peck as Georgie Sutton (season 1): one of the original members of the human resistance who wants revenge against the Visitors for causing his family's deaths after he discovered the V's agenda. In an attempt to save Ryan, he is captured by the Visitors. He is tortured for information and later chooses to die rather than reveal Fifth Column members.
- Roark Critchlow as Paul Kendrick: Erica's superior in the FBI counterterrorism unit. He has long suspected that Erica might be a member of the Fifth Column, and reveals himself to be part of another underground anti-V organization known as Project Aries.
- Alan Tudyk as Dale Maddox (season 1): Erica's first partner in the series. Erica discovers he is a Visitor and wounds him. He ends up on Anna's ship, where he is killed by Joshua, the V physician, who is also a spy for the Fifth Column.
- Lucas Wolf, as Samuel (season 1): a Visitor Fifth Columnist who worked alongside Joshua.
- Rekha Sharma as Agent Sarita Malik: an FBI agent assigned to work with Erica. Like Erica's previous partner, she is also revealed to be a V mole. After her true identity is discovered, she is tortured and killed by the Resistance.
- Scott Hylands as Father Travis: an elder priest at the same church where Father Jack works. He appears to side with the Visitors in several conversations with Father Jack.
- Lexa Doig as Dr. Leah Pearlman (season 1): a V doctor posing as Valerie's human physician. She is also Fifth Column.
- Nicholas Lea as Joe Evans: Erica's ex-husband who left her after blood tests revealed that their son, Tyler, could not possibly be his. He tries to reconnect with his wife and son after learning the truth about Tyler's altered DNA. In season two, he is caught in a crossfire between FBI agents and the Fifth Column, and is shot and killed.
- Jane Badler as Diana (season 2): Anna's mother, who is being held prisoner on the Visitor mothership in a secret prison cell made to resemble their home world. This Diana is a completely different character from the one that Badler played in the original 1980s series. She was once Queen until she proposed that the Visitors live in peace with humans. Anna finally overthrew her and imprisoned her for 15 years. She was eventually rescued in the season-two finale, but rather than escape, she chose to confront her subjects and was killed by Anna.
- Bret Harrison, as Sidney Miller (season 2): an evolutionary biologist, whom Erica tracks down to explain the Red Sky. Since then, he has continued to work with the Fifth Column.
- Oded Fehr as Eli Cohn (season 2): an ex-Mossad agent and the leader of a radical Fifth Column cell, with whom Erica shockingly has a mysterious past. He is killed in a staged hostage crisis after turning over his global contacts, as well as leadership of his cell, to Erica. Rosenbaum has stated, "The two of them have something in common that she [Erica] never would have guessed."
- Jay Karnes as Chris Bolling (season 2): Erica's newly assigned FBI partner, who trained with her at Quantico. He begins to suspect that Erica may have divided loyalties when it comes to her dedication to bringing down the Fifth Column. In the season-two finale, he is revealed to be a member of a secret global anti-V cabal known as Project Aries.
- Martin Cummins as Thomas (season 2): the chief engineer of Anna's Concordia project who is temporarily promoted to second-in-command following the shooting of Marcus.
- Ona Grauer as Kerry Eltoff (season 2): Chad's co-anchor on Prime Focus, added by their producer to provide an opposing viewpoint to Chad's Visitor-centric reporting. He tricks her into claiming that sources showed a citywide blackout was the result of the unstable Visitor Concordia generator, causing her to be fired for false reporting. Anna had revealed to Chad, though, that Kerry's viewpoints were "dangerous" to Visitor/human relations and would not be tolerated. So, in getting her fired, Chad not only removed her as a threat to his cover but also protected her from Anna's wrath.
- Marc Singer as Lars Tremont (season 2): a member of a top-secret organization of high-ranking military and government leaders (called Project Aries), who know more about the Visitors than most, and have been secretly preparing for a Visitor attack. Singer also played a leading role in the original 1980s series.

== Production ==
The series was announced in May 2009, to be executive produced by Scott Peters, Jace Hall, Steve Pearlman, and Jeffrey Bell. Filming of the post-pilot episodes began on August 10, 2009. Cast member Elizabeth Mitchell noted that the show would do service to the most iconic moments from the original franchise.

Peters later confirmed that in addition to potentially using cast members from the 1983 miniseries, the new series would nod to the original in other ways. He said that when asking people what they thought were the most memorable elements of V, the top responses included "the huge ships, the red uniforms, eating the hamster, and [the] alien baby," adding, "we are well aware of those moments and are looking to put our own little spin on them to tip our hat to the old audience."

Entertainment Weekly put the original V on its 2008 list "The Sci-Fi 25: The Genre's Best Since 1982" and called Visitor leader Diana's devouring of a guinea pig "one of the best TV reveals ever." Asked about the 1983 reveal of the Visitors' reptilian appearance beneath their human disguise, Peters noted, "That was the other one, of course... We tried to put our own [spin on it]. We're... a little bit different [from] their execution of it. It wasn't so much latex mask as it is real flesh and blood."

Reuters called the idea behind V, "a powerhouse concept that combines conflict, suspense, and imagination with some heavy-duty philosophical issues," noting that the update "preserves the original framework, but shifts the atmosphere to accommodate contemporary concerns... the militaristic notes will be more subdued. Instead, there will be more of a post-9/11 emphasis on questions of trust and terror."

Production on the show was temporarily suspended in August 2009, pending the resolution of a dispute filed with the Writers Guild of America by original creator Kenneth Johnson. Warner Bros. sought to remove Johnson's "created by" status by claiming that the new show was so fundamentally changed from Johnson's original premise that it constituted a standalone work and not a remake. The Writers Guild, however, disagreed, and when production resumed in September 2009, Johnson retained the credit.

In September 2009, four episodes of V were announced to air in November 2009, and the series would resume its 12-episode season in March 2010 after the 2010 Winter Olympics. ABC entertainment president Steve McPherson said, "We always intended to break the show up into 'pods' to make it more of an event." As production of the fourth episode of V wrapped, a November 3, 2009, announcement indicated that Scott Rosenbaum had been named executive producer and showrunner of the series, with Peters and Hall remaining as executive producers. Production of the remaining eight episodes resumed in January 2010, with new episodes returning March 30, 2010. On May 13, 2010, ABC renewed V for a second season. The second season premiered January 4, 2011, but the original order of 13 episodes was reduced to 10.

On May 13, 2011, ABC announced that V was cancelled.

== Reception ==
=== Critical reception ===
The series premiere of V received "generally favorable reviews", scoring 67 out of 100 on Metacritic based on reviews from 23 critics. E! Online stated "on a scale of 1 to 10, we give it an 11. V is the best pilot we've seen in, well, forever." USA Today's Robert Bianco put V on his list of the top ten new shows, stating that the remake is well-made and "quickly establishes its own identity," and The Hollywood Reporter called the new series "clever enough for a cult following and accessible enough to reach a broad demo." King Features' entertainment reporter Cindy Elavsky calls V "the best new show on television, by far. The special effects are feature-film quality, the writing is intelligent and time-relevant, and the acting is first-rate. The first five minutes alone will hook you for the entire season." The New York Times wrote that "The ideas in V, about alien encounters and mass delusion and media manipulation, are enticing. It's too bad that they're floating around in a show that at this early stage, is so slapdash and formulaic in its storytelling." The A.V. Club gave V's premiere a 'C' rating, calling it "rote and by-the-numbers."

Metacritic gave the second-season premiere a score of 49/100 based on reviews from 13 critics, indicating mixed reviews.

==== Interpretation ====
The reimagined series has been interpreted by some reviewers as an allegory of the presidency of Barack Obama. In his review of the show, Troy Patterson of Slate points out that bloggers and journalists had noticed parallels between the show's premise and the Obama administration, and writes, "if the show is to have the symbolic import that we expect from a science-fiction story, this is the only possible way to read V as a coherent text. The only problem with this analysis lies in its generous presupposition that the text is, in fact, coherent." Lisa de Moraes of The Washington Post noted in her review that the fact the series was debuting on the first anniversary of Obama's election "was not lost on some ... TV critics" and also remarked that the use of phrases present in the series (such as "hope", "change", and "Universal Health Care" being offered by the Visitors) made it seem as though "Lou Dobbs had taken over the network, as those things only became popular with the current administration." Chicago Tribune reviewer Glenn Garvin called the show "controversial", saying the series was "a barbed commentary on Obamamania that will infuriate the president's supporters and delight his detractors."

The show's cast and crew deny this interpretation. Actress Morena Baccarin acknowledges that she had modeled her character, Visitor leader Anna, after politicians, but series executive producer Peters and she were surprised by the controversy. At a press conference at Summer TV Press Tour 2009, Peters said that the show was open to interpretation and, "people bring subjective thoughts to it... but there is no particular agenda." Bell agreed, stating it was simply "a show about spaceships."

In retrospect, Baccarin said: "Originally, what was intended with the show, the aliens—the visitors had been amongst us for hundreds of years and were the impetus and the catalyst for a lot of plagues and a lot of world wars, and had kind of instigated these things to kind of try to end humanity and to control humanity. I thought that was the direction that we were headed, and then we ended up having two or three different showrunners, and ABC didn't really know which direction they wanted to take the show. It became kind of a mess, but what first attracted me to the show was definitely this possibility that we could make parallels to the modern world."

=== Ratings ===
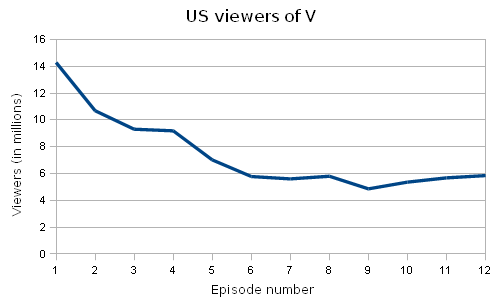
Graph of the U.S. viewing figures of the first season of V

The pilot episode, which aired on November 3, 2009, garnered 14.3 million viewers and scored a 5.2 rating among 18- to 49-year-olds, making it the highest debut of the 2009–10 season. The first four episodes of the first season averaged 9.75 million viewers and a 3.4 rating among 18- to 49-year-olds, ranking 34th in the television season. The remainder of season one began airing in March 2010, and by the end of the second half of the season, the average viewer count had dropped to 5.72 million viewers and a 2.3 18–49 rating, ranking 89th.

The second season averaged 6.93 million viewers per episode and had an average 18–49 rating of 2.5, ranking 75th for the 2010–11 season.

In the UK, the show premiered on the premium channel Syfy. The original broadcast of the pilot was seen by 481,000 viewers and was the most-watched show for the network for its entire first season. The second season premiered to 401,000 viewers, again becoming number one for the network. In October 2010, when the show debuted on the free-to-air channel Channel One, it gained even higher ratings. The pilot episode garnered 541,000 viewers (and 338,000 for the repeat viewing two days later). The show remained the channel's number-one show for several weeks, and was in the channel's top three for the entirety of its first season.

=== Accolades ===
V was nominated for Outstanding Special Visual Effects for a Series at the 2010 Creative Arts Emmy Awards for the pilot episode. The show was also nominated for Favorite New TV Drama at the 36th People's Choice Awards and for Best Television Presentation. Morena Baccarin was nominated for Best Supporting Actress on Television at the 36th Saturn Awards. At the 37th Saturn Awards, the show received three nominations, for Best Network Series, Elizabeth Mitchell for Best Actress in Television, and Morena Baccarin for Best Supporting Actress in Television. At the 8th Visual Effects Society Awards, the show received nominations in the categories of Outstanding Visual Effects in a Broadcast Series and Outstanding Created Environment in a Broadcast Program or Commercial, winning in the Created Environment category for the Atrium and ship interiors.

=== Cancellation response ===
Following ABC's cancellation of V in May 2011, the fan letter-writing campaign "Project Alice" began writing to Warner Bros. to renew the series on a different network. The campaign initially sought to get the show renewed on TNT, while later efforts had also concentrated on the CW Network, as well. Both networks are owned by Warner Bros. Television's parent company, Time Warner. Ultimately, the campaign was unsuccessful.

== DVD and Blu-ray releases ==
Season	Release dates				
Season	Region 1 (U.S./Canada)	Region 2 (UK/South Africa/Europe)	Region 4 (Australia)	Region 4 (New Zealand)	Region 4 (Mexico)
1	November 2, 2010	November 8, 2010	November 10, 2010	November 17, 2010	December 9, 2010
2	October 18, 2011	October 24, 2011	October 26, 2011	—N/a	—N/a

Special features on the first season DVD and Blu-ray include a commentary track on "Fruition" by executive producers Scott Rosenbaum and Steve Pearlman, deleted scenes, and four behind-the-scenes featurettes – "The Actor's Journey from Human to V", "An Alien in Human Skin: The Makeup FX of V", Breaking Story: The World of V", and "The Visual FX of V".

Special features on the second season DVD and Blu-ray include deleted and extended scenes, blooper reel, and two featurettes – "The Arc of Story: Mining the Human Evolution" and "A Visual Masterpiece for the Small Screen".
