= The Murders =

Canadian television series

- Official Citytv poster
- Genre: Police drama; Thriller
- Created by: Damon Vignale
- Starring: Jessica Lucas; Lochlyn Munro; Dylan Bruce; Luvia Petersen; Terry Chen
- Country of origin: Canada
- No. of episodes: 8

Production
- Executive producers: Damon Vignale; Jesse Prupas; Michael Prupas; Jamie Goehring; Shawn Williamson; Jessica Lucas
- Producer: Arielle Boisvert
- Cinematography: Kamal Derkaoui
- Running time: 44 minutes
- Production companies: Muse Entertainment; Rogers Media

Original release
- Network: Citytv
- Release: March 25 – May 5, 2019

The Murders is a Canadian police procedural drama television series created by Damon Vignale. Starring Jessica Lucas and produced by Muse Entertainment in conjunction with Rogers Media, the series debuted on Citytv and FX in Canada on March 25, 2019.

== Cast and characters ==
- Jessica Lucas as Kate Jameson, a rookie homicide detective
- Lochlyn Munro as Mike Huntley, Jameson's original homicide detective partner
- Dylan Bruce as Nolan Wells, Jameson's replacement homicide detective partner
- Terry Chen as Staff Sergeant Bill Chen
- Luvia Petersen as Detective Meg Harris
- Venus Terzo as Rita Gallo, Jameson's mother

== Episodes ==
No.	Title	Directed by	Written by	FX debut	City debut	Canada viewers (millions)
1	"The Long Black Veil / Erreur tragique (FR)"	Jill Carter	Damon Vignale	March 25, 2019	25 March 2019	0.09
2	"Heist / Braquage (FR)"	Jill Carter	Damon Vignale	March 31, 2019	1 April 2019	0.12
3	"Queen of Hearts / Reine de coeur (FR)"	Andy Mikita	Jonathan Lloyd Walker	April 8, 2019	8 April 2019	0.15
4	"Never Kissed a Girl / Amour de jeunesse (FR)"	Andy Mikita	Karen Hill	April 15, 2019	8 April 2019	N/A
5	"Toxic / Toxique (FR)"	Kristin Lehman	Laura Good - Damon Vignale	April 22, 2019	22 April 2019	N/A
6	"Black and Blue / Gardien du secret (FR)"	Kristin Lehman	Gemma Holdway	April 28, 2019	29 April 2019	N/A
7	"In My Feelings / Otage du passé (FR)"	Jill Carter	Karen Hill	April 28, 2019	6 May 2019	N/A
8	"Stereo / Ballades macabres (FR)"	Jill Carter	Damon Vignale	May 5, 2019	13 May 2019	N/A

== International broadcast ==
In February 2019, NBCUniversal International Networks acquired the series for its Universal TV and 13th Street channels in Africa, France, Germany, Poland, Spain, and the United Kingdom.
