= Atmosphere (disambiguation) =

An atmosphere is a gas layer around a celestial body.

Atmosphere may also refer to:

== Science ==
- Atmosphere (unit), a unit of pressure
- Atmosphere of Earth
- Extraterrestrial atmospheres
- Stellar atmosphere

== Arts, entertainment, and media ==
=== Groups ===
- Atmosphere (group), an American hip-hop duo from Minnesota
- Atmosphere (Polish band)

=== Albums ===
- Atmosphere (Atmosphere album) (1997)
- Atmosphere (Eloy Fritsch album) (2003)
- Atmosphere (Kaskade album) (2013), or the title song
- Atmosphere (Sevenglory album) (2007)
- Atmosphere, a 1969 album by Colours, produced by Dan Moore and Richard Delvy
- Atmospheres (album) (2014)

=== Songs and orchestral pieces ===
- "Atmosphere" (Drax Project song) (2023)
- "Atmosphere" (Joy Division song) (1980)
- "Atmosphere" (Kaskade song) (2013)
- "Atmosphere" (Fisher and Kita Alexander song) (2023)
- "Atmosphere" (1975), from Let's Take It to the Stage by Funkadelic
- "Atmosphere" (2001), from Singularity by Joe Morris
- "Atmosphere" (1984), by Russ Abbot
- Atmosphères (1961), an orchestral piece by György Ligeti

=== Periodicals ===
- Atmosphere (journal), an open access scientific journal
- Atmosphere (magazine), the inflight magazine of Air Transat

=== Other uses in arts, entertainment, and media ===
- Atmosphere (novel), a 2025 novel by Taylor Jenkins Reid
- Atmospheres (TV series)
- Atmospheric theatre, a type of cinema architecture
- Atmosphere, another term for a film extra
- Atmosphere (literature), a literary term referring to the mood surrounding a story
- Atmosphere (service), a video on-demand service that provides content in a business-to-business capacity

== Other uses ==
- Atmosphere (architecture and spatial design)
- Atmosphere (Kolkata), a residential superstructure in India
- Adobe Atmosphere, a computer graphics platform
- Atmosphere Visual Effects, a Canadian company
- At.mosphere, a restaurant on the 122nd floor of the Burj Khalifa

== See also ==
- Atmosfear (disambiguation)
