= Last minute =

Last Minute may refer to:

- The Last Minute, a film from Stephen Norrington
- "Last Minute", a song from Marcin Rozynek's album Ubieranie do snu
- Last Minute (band), a band formed by Ryan Primack
- "Last Minute" (Continuum), the third-season finale of the Canadian television series, Continuum
- lastminute.com, a British travel company
