= Hossein Rezai =

Hossein Rezai-Jorabi
- Born: 24 September 1956 (age 69) Tehran, Iran
- Nationality: Iranian/Italian
- Discipline: Structural Engineering
- Institutions: Institution of Structural Engineers; University of Westminster
- Doctoral Advisor: Professor Paul Erskine Regan

Engineering Career
- Significant Projects: The Troika, Capella Singapore, Atmosphere (Kolkata), National Design Centre, Dhoby Ghaut Green, Pinewood Iskandar Malaysia Studios, Four Seasons Resort, Seychelles, Grand Hyatt Kuala Lumpur, Lincoln Modern Singapore
- Significant Awards: President*s Design Award (P*DA), Designer of the Year, 2016

Hossein Rezai-Jorabi (born 1956) is a structural engineer, a design visionary, and an educator based in Singapore. He is the founding principal of international design engineering consultancy Web Structures Pte Ltd (acquired by Ramboll in 2020) and the managing director of the Milan Research Lab; a research and consultancy start up, based in Milan – Italy, dedicated to research in advanced computational design and engineering analysis.

Rezai is now the Global Design Director at Ramboll, and a Professor of Practice at the Department of Architecture, College of Design and Engineering, National University of Singapore. He has been recognised for his contributions to engineering and was named 'Designer of the Year' by Singaporean President Tony Tan in the 2016 President's Design Awards.

== Education and academic activities ==
Rezai obtained his PHD from the University of Westminster and worked there as a research assistant and fellow. He has written and presented several technical papers and has lectured at the University of Westminster, Politecnico Di Milano, National University of Singapore, Victoria and Albert Museum, Institution of Civil Engineers and Singapore University of Technology and Design.

His works have been published in newspapers, international architecture magazines and books, including the Institution of Structural Engineers' magazine and the Architects' Journal.

== Accolades ==
In 2016, Rezai received the Singapore President's Design Award 'Designer of the Year' – the first engineer to win the award.

Web Structures' awards include the RIBA Award for International Excellence 2012 for The Troika (Kuala Lumpur), the 14th SIA Architectural Design Award 2014 for the National Design Centre, and the ISE Singapore Structural Award 2016 for the Mediacorp Campus building.

Rezai and Web Structures projects have been featured in The Telegraph, The Straits Times, Financial Times, Forbes, Dezeen and more. Rezai has also appeared as a guest expert on Channel News Asia, BBC News and National Geographic.

Rezai was part of the master jury in the 2016 Aga Khan Award for Architecture – the first Singapore professional to be on the jury.

== Publications ==
- REZAI-JORABI, H., “Shear reinforcement in ordinary reinforced and prestressed concrete beams”, Ph.D. thesis, Polytechnic of Central London, 1984, pp. 308
- REGAN, P.E. and REZAI-JORABI, H., “Comments on the shear provisions of the CEB-MC78 for prestressed beams (with straight cables) with web steel”, paper to CEB Commission IV, Rotterdam, 1985.
- REZAI-JORABI, H., “Rehabilitation, Upgrading, Refurbishment”, Preliminary Report, Structures Research Group, Polytechnic of Central London, Feb 1986, pp. 24.
- REZAI-JORABI, H. and REGAN, P.E., “Shear resistance of prestressed concrete beams with inclined tendons”, The Structural Engineer, Vol. 64B No. 3, Sep 1986, pp. 63 - 75.
- REZAI-JORABI, H., “Wide-beam shear resistance of I-sectioned reinforced concrete beams”, Structures Research Group, Polytechnic of Central London, Aug 1987, pp. 38.
- REGAN, P.E. and REZAI-JORABI, H., “Shear resistance of I-sectioned reinforced concrete beams”, Structures Research Group, Polytechnic of Central London, Aug 1987, pp. 38.
- REGAN, P.E. and REZAI-JORABI, H., “Shear resistance of one-way slabs under concentrated loads”, American Concrete Institute Structural Journal, Vol. 85, No. 2, Mar - Apr 1988, pp. 150 - 158.
- REGAN, P.E., REZAI-JORABI, H. and KYRIACOU, A.G. “Structural implications of loss of cover to main steel in reinforced concrete beams”, Structures Research Group, Polytechnic of Central London, Nov 1988, pp. 20.
- REZAI-JORABI, H., “Structured Creativity”, Journal of the Singapore Institute of Architects, No. 209:00, May 2001, pp. 94-99.
- REZAI-JORABI, H., “Subjective Structures”, Journal of the Singapore Institute of Architects, No.213, May 2002, pp. 70-77.
- REZAI-JORABI, H., “On Environmental Responsiveness and Technology Integration”, Architecture & Purality: Aga Khan Award for Architecture, Nov 2016, pp. 330-335.
- REZAI-JORABI, H., “Of Structures and Tress: An Engineering Prospective”, Docomomo publication on the 8th mASEANa project conference, 2019, pp. 78-81.
- REZAI-JORABI, H., et al, “Creating Value”, Ramboll DESIGN Publication, Edition 1, Jan 2023, pp. 16.
- REZAI-JORABI, H., et al, “Design Excellence”, Ramboll DESIGN Publication, Edition 2, Feb 2023, pp. 12.
- REZAI-JORABI, H., et al, “Ramboll Design System”, Ramboll DESIGN Publication, Edition 3, Mar 2023, pp. 20.
- REZAI-JORABI, H., et al, “Regenerative Worldwide”, Ramboll DESIGN Publication, Edition 4, Apr 2023, pp. 24.
- REZAI-JORABI, H., et al, “In Praise of Retrofit”, Ramboll DESIGN Publication, Edition 5, Jul 2023, pp. 24.
- REZAI-JORABI, H., et al, “AI for Augmented Intelligence”, Ramboll DESIGN Publication, Edition 6, Sep 2023, pp. 32.
- REZAI-JORABI, H., et al, Ramboll DESIGN Excellence Publication, 2022, Nov 2023, pp. 274.
- REZAI-JORABI, H., et al, “Decarbonisation in Depth”, Ramboll DESIGN Publication, Edition 7, Feb 2024, pp. 28.
- REZAI-JORABI, H., et al, “MMC – State of the Art”, Ramboll DESIGN Publication, Special Edition, May 2024, pp. 36.
- REZAI-JORABI, H., et al, “MMC – Construction Site to Assembly site”, Ramboll DESIGN Publication, Edition 8, Jun 2023, pp. 20.
- REZAI-JORABI, H., et al, Ramboll DESIGN Publication, 2023-2024, Aug 2024, pp. 208.
- REZAI-JORABI, H., et al, “Health by Design”, Ramboll DESIGN Publication, Edition 9, Oct 2024, pp. 24.
- REZAI-JORABI, H., et al, “System Thinking”, Ramboll DESIGN Publication, Edition 10, Feb 2024, pp. 24.
- REZAI-JORABI, H., et al, Ramboll DESIGN Publication, 2024-2025, Apr 2025, pp. 232.
- REZAI-JORABI, H., et al, “On Regenerative Design, on Systems, On Complexity. The Polimi Lectures”, Polimi/Ramboll Publication, May 2025, pp. 320.
