= Contact Singapore =

Tourism and immigration advertising agency in Singapore

Agency overview
- Formed: 1998
- Headquarters: 250 North Bridge Road, #28-00, Raffles City Tower, Singapore 179101
- Employees: ~65
- Parent agency: Economic Development Board and Ministry of Manpower
- Website: http://www.contactsingapore.sg/

Contact Singapore (Chinese: 联系新加坡) was an agency of the Singapore government whose primary function is to draw people from around the world to work, invest and live in Singapore, with the ultimate aim of boosting economic development. It was an alliance of Singapore’s Economic Development Board and Ministry of Manpower.

Contact Singapore has offices in the Asia-Pacific, Europe and North America. It partners Singapore-based employers and industry players to organise career fairs and networking sessions in cities across the world, and provide updates on career opportunities and various industry developments to individuals.

Contact Singapore also attracts those who are keen to invest in or initiate new business activities in Singapore. It facilitates business development and relocation to Singapore, for example, by helping investors to arrange for entry to Singapore via business visas and permanent residency programmes.

== History ==
Contact Singapore was started by the Prime Minister’s Office (Singapore) and came under the Ministry of Manpower in 1998. In April 2008, an alliance was formed between the Economic Development Board and the Ministry of Manpower to leverage the business network and investment promotion capability of the Economic Development Board and the talent outreach of the Ministry of Manpower.

The main responsibilities of Contact Singapore are:

- To draw business leaders and entrepreneurs who will bring with them business activity and investments, to help create productive industry clusters and generate economic wealth and good jobs for Singaporeans.
- To attract talented non-Singaporeans and Singaporeans living overseas to complement Singapore’s workforce and grow successful industries.

== Events and Programmes ==
Contact Singapore manages various programmes to reach out to experienced and young professionals, students, investors and overseas Singaporeans. These include:

=== Careers@Singapore ===
Held in major cities in the Asia-Pacific, Europe and North America, this programme brings Singapore-based employers from specific industries together with global professionals and graduating students interested in working in these industries in Singapore. Participants can find out more about working and living in Singapore, and network with industry professionals and Singapore-based employers. Employers also get access to a ready pool of talent to source from. Similar sessions dedicated to Singaporeans living overseas are known as Careers@Home.

=== Experience@Singapore ===
Experience@Singapore is a programme designed to give undergraduate and graduate students from top universities an introduction to Singapore. It provides them with the opportunity to meet the top management of Singapore-based companies and visit infrastructural projects which are key to the development of Singapore's industries. Participants are also introduced to aspects of living in Singapore. Experience@Home is a programme dedicated to Singaporeans living outside of Singapore. Through internships and study trips offered by this programme, participants can obtain career and industry information on Singapore.

=== Insights@Singapore ===
Contact Singapore invites industry experts from Singapore to share their knowledge and expertise in their respective fields and industries through its Insights@Singapore sessions. Dedicated sessions for overseas Singaporeans, Insights@Home, are also organised.

=== Work Holiday Programme ===
The Work Holiday Programme is a programme that allows university students and recent graduates between 17 and 30 years old to live and work in Singapore for up to six months. The programme aims to attract youths keen to travel abroad and experience a foreign culture. It allows participants to discover the spectrum of career opportunities in Singapore experience living in this cosmopolitan city.

=== Work in Singapore information sessions ===
Contact Singapore holds Work in Singapore information sessions for global talent interested to find out more about working and living in Singapore. Through a job portal managed by Contact Singapore and supported by industry partners, Contact Singapore lists vacancies in Singapore-based companies that span sectors from technology to finance. The portal allows for the submission of resumes.

=== Global Investor Programme ===
The Global Investor Programme allows entrepreneurs and businessmen who are keen to invest or initiate new business activities in Singapore to apply for Singapore Permanent Residence through making investments in Singapore.
