= Lost Hours =

- Continuum episode
- Episode no.: Season 4 Episode 1
- Directed by: Patrick Williams
- Written by: Simon Barry
- Original air dates: August 21, 2015 (online); September 4, 2015 (Showcase)

Guest appearances
- Terry Chen (Curtis Chen); Sean Michael Kyer (Sam Cameron); Magda Apanowicz (Emily / Maya Hartwell); Richard Harmon (Julian Randol); Ian Tracey (Jason Sadler); William B. Davis (Elderly Alec Sadler)

Episode chronology
← Previous "Last Minute"	Next → "Rush Hour"
- Continuum (season 4)

"Lost Hours" is the premiere episode of the fourth season of the Canadian TV series Continuum, and the series' 37th episode overall. The episode aired September 4, 2015 on Showcase, and was released online two weeks early on August 21. The episode was written by Simon Barry and directed by Patrick Williams.

== Plot ==
The episode opens with a recap of the previous three seasons before transitioning into Alec and Emily being reunited after Alec dropped the charges against her after she tried to kill the other Alec. In return for the favor, Carlos asks that Alec gain Piron technology for the police department, although Alec responds by explaining that Kellog has tricked the other him out of the company.

Across town, Kiera and Brad activate Brad's signal to see if they had averted his future, only for a number of soldiers from his time to suddenly appear and give chase to Kiera. One soldier eventually catches up to her and renders her unconscious. Alec and Carlos find her and take her to Alec's house. While there, Kiera asks Alec to find her a way home. In the morning Kiera wakes to find Jason, Emily, Lucas and Alec working on a way to take down Kellog.

While at the precinct, Carlos discovers that Dillon is planning on leaving the VPD. Alec meanwhile goes to Julian with his plan to take down Kellog, to which Julian agrees to help. This allows Alec to successfully hack into Kellog's system and retrieve the information that they need to send Kiera home.

The next day, Kiera and Alec attempt to track down Brad and the soldiers. Once they find them, Alec and Jason have Kiera steal a small pen-like device, however this causes suspicion from one of the soldiers, Vasquez, who opens fire upon Kiera and reveals her position. After a brief fight, Kiera is rendered unconscious and then wakes to find herself on the edge of a building being questioned by the soldiers who throw her off the building once they are finished.

Garza arrives and covers Kiera as she climbs into the car before they escape. Meanwhile, Emily is attacked by unknown men and kidnapped. That night, Carlos and Kiera share a drink as they discuss her returning to her own time.

== Cast and characters ==
=== Main ===
- Rachel Nichols as Kiera Cameron
- Victor Webster as Carlos Fonnegra
- Erik Knudsen as Alec Sadler
- Stephen Lobo as Matthew Kellog
- Roger Cross as Travis Verta
- Ryan Robbins as Brad
- Omari Newton as Lucas Ingram
- Luvia Petersen as Jasmine Garza

=== Guest ===
- Terry Chen as Curtis Chen
- Sean Michael Kyer as Sam Cameron
- Magda Apanowicz as Emily / Maya Hartwell
- Richard Harmon as Julian Randol
- Ian Tracey as Jason Sadler
- William B. Davis as the elderly Alec Sadler

== Reception ==
=== Reviews ===
Kristof Stevenson of Superior Realities gave a positive review of the episode, giving it a score of 8.1 out of 10, he commented that the shorter season allows the episode to never dull and called Emily's fight scene "one of the best fight sequences [he'd] ever seen."
