= Leo Resig =

American businessman

- Occupations: Journalist, editor, internet entrepreneur
- Website: http://thechive.com/about/

Leo Resig is a U.S.-based entrepreneur in the sectors of digital media, eCommerce, and streaming television. He is currently the co-founder and CEO of the over-the-top video-on-demand service, Atmosphere.TV.

Previously to Atmosphere, Resig served as co-founder and CEO of Chive Media Group, the parent company of The Chive, theBERRY.com, TheChivery.com, and ChiveRareCoins.com. He started the flagship site, theCHIVE, in November 2008 with his brother John Resig. theChive is a popular men's content and commerce destination and operates native iOS and Android apps.

Resig also co-founded a golf apparel company with actor Bill Murray called William Murray Golf.

== Life and career ==
Hailing from Fort Wayne, Indiana, and graduating from Indiana University Bloomington, Leo now lives in Austin, Texas and works closely with brother John (co-founder of theCHIVE).

=== theChive ===
The family turned theChive into a success with a series of viral hoaxes that were reported by the mainstream media as true.

In the summer of 2013 Resignation Media relocated to Austin, Texas from Los Angeles, California.

=== Keep Calm and Chive On ===
Keep Calm and Chive On (KCCO) is modern slang for "don't stress about life, enjoy it." The expression originated during World War II with Keep Calm and Carry On propaganda, but was morphed into a modern pop culture reference revolving around the Chive.

=== Tapiture ===
Following the success of theChive, the brothers launched an early version of Tapiture in the Summer of 2012. The site was originally referred to as a "Pinterest for Dudes" and despite skepticism, the site was attracting 1.5 million monthly unique visitors after 6 weeks of its debut. Tapiture was spun out and in September 2012, John Ellis was hired as CEO to raise funds and build the business. Leo is an investor in Tapiture and a member of its board of directors. Tapiture is headquartered in Santa Monica, California.

On October 2, 2015, Tapiture sold to Playboy for an undisclosed amount.

=== William Murray Golf ===
William Murray Golf, a golf apparel company, began in 2017 as a collaboration between Resig, his brother John, actor Bill Murray, and Murray's brothers. The brand is known for a mix of casual and unusual prints and has partnered with the likes of professional golfers like Jason Kokrak, Pat Perez, as well as D.A. Points. In 2022, William Murray Golf expanded to include women's golf apparel, as well.

=== Atmosphere ===
Resig spun off Atmosphere.TV, a U.S.-based streaming platform made exclusively for businesses, from Chive Media Group in 2019. This video-on-demand service has since gained media attention as a particularly "innovative" company, receiving awards and accolades including:

- Digiday's "Best Connected TV Platform"
- Fast Company's "The 10 most innovative companies in video in 2022"
- Forbes' "Next Billion Dollar Companies 2022"

Since its inception, Atmosphere has raised a total of $143 million — $18 million in Series A funding in 2019, $25 million of Series B funding in April 2021, and $100 million in December 2021 (the summation of $80 million in Series C funding and $20 million in debt).
