= Atmospheres (disambiguation) =

Atmospheres usually refers to the unit of standard atmosphere.

Atmospheres or Atmosphères may also refer to:

- The plural of atmosphere
- Atmospheres (TV series), 2000 American television series
- Atmospheres (album), 2014 album by Justin Jarvis
- Atmosphères, composition by György Ligeti
- Atmosphères (album), 2016 album by Tigran Hamasyan

== See also ==
- Atmosphere (disambiguation)
