= Maa Flyover =

Flyover in Kolkata

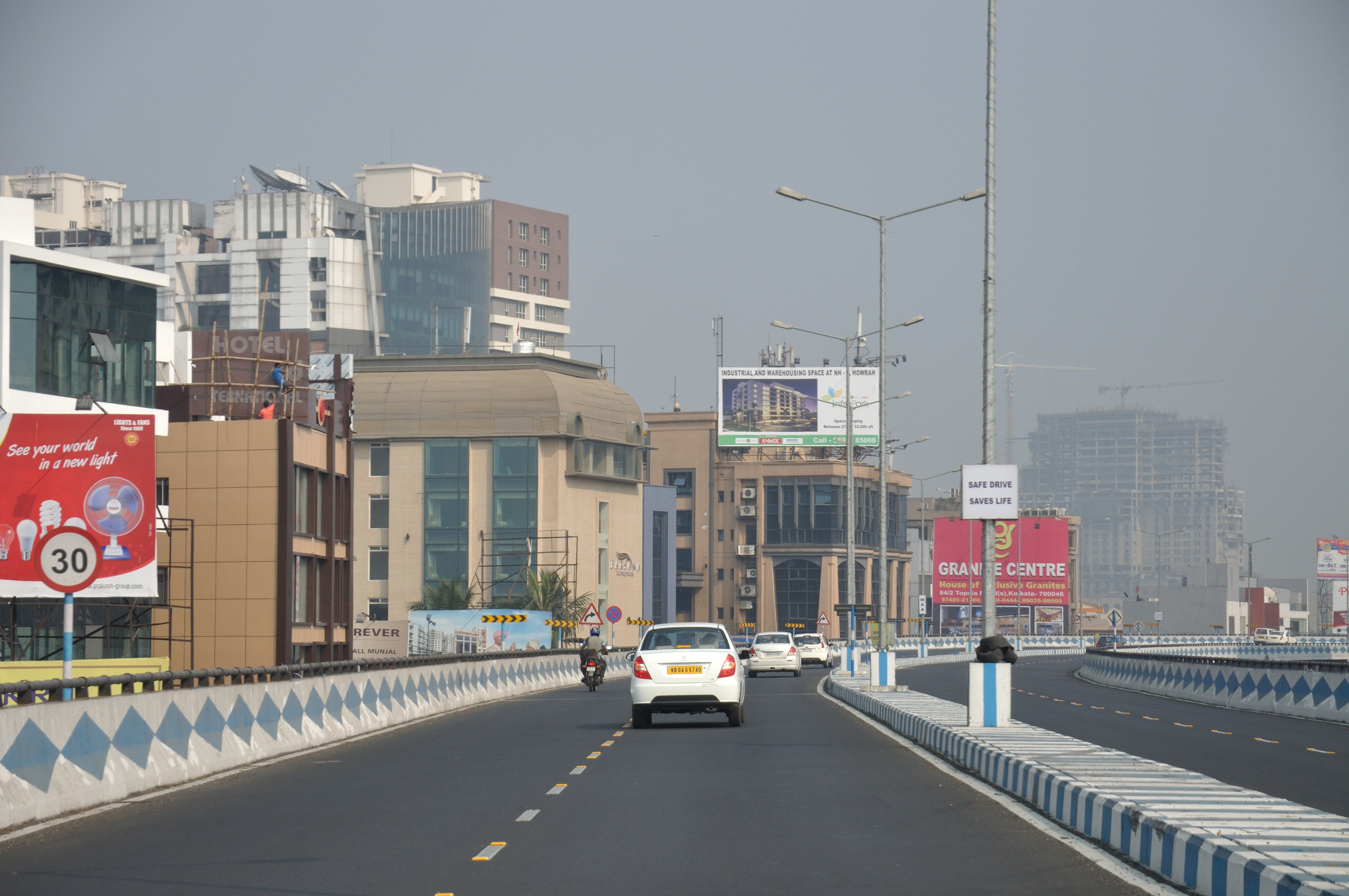
Maa Flyover over JBS Haldane Avenue

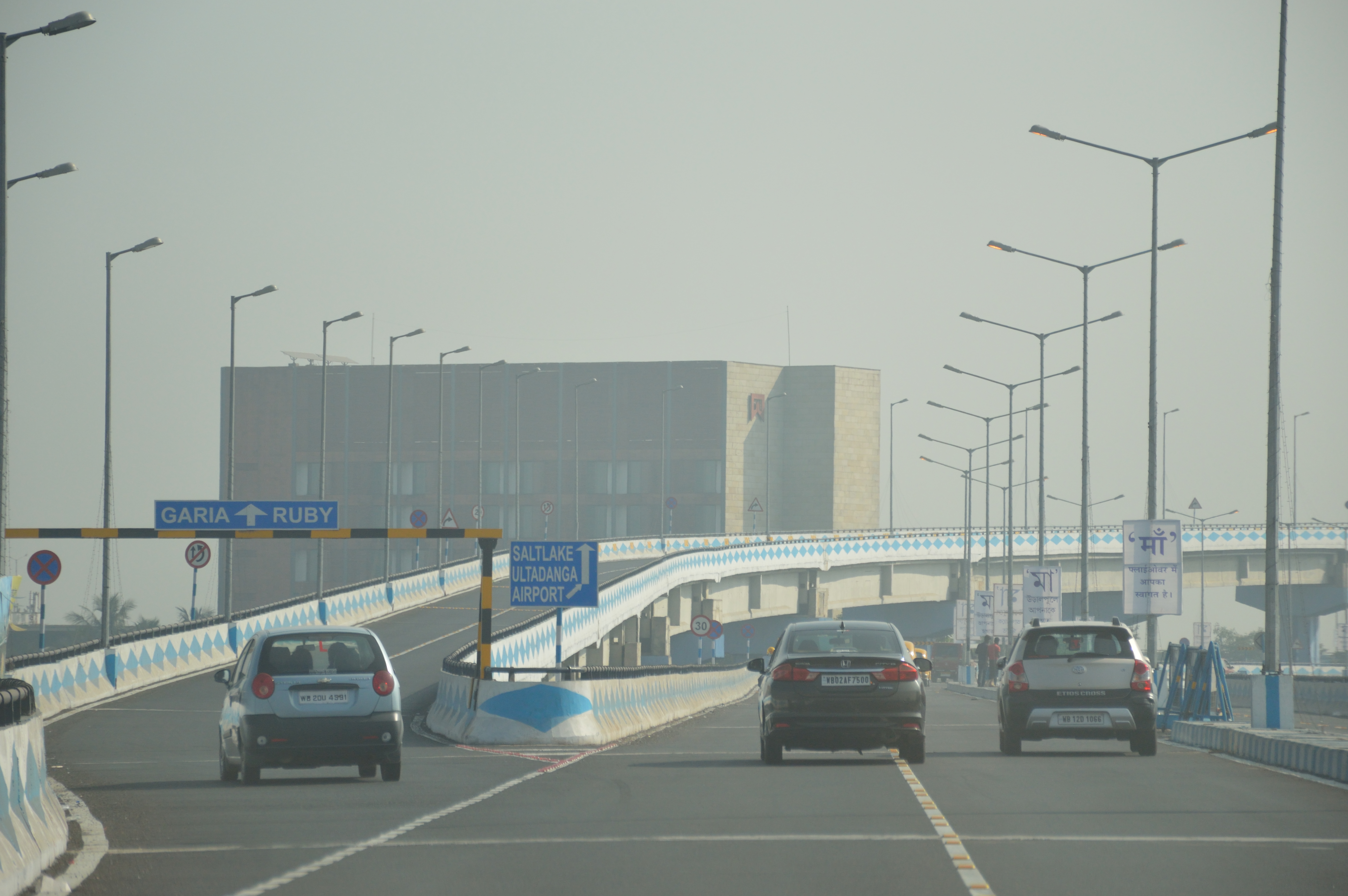
Maa flyover near Science City

Maa Flyover (Bengali: মা উড়ালপুল; also known as Parama Island Flyover) is a 7.50-kilometre (4.66 mi) long flyover in Kolkata, West Bengal, India. It is built along Park Circus Connector and connects EM Bypass with Park Circus 7-Point Crossing. After both ramps of the flyover connecting it with AJC Bose Road Flyover were completed in early 2019, the flyover forms a seamless, no-signal traffic corridor from EM Bypass to PG Hospital. The total length of the flyover, including the ramps, is 9.2 km (5.7 mi) and is the fourth longest flyover in the entire country. The flyover started its construction in February 2010. The project had an original deadline of August 2012, and the deadline was extended multiple times. After a huge cost-overrun and delays, the main flyover was opened on 9 October 2015 at a cost of ₹460 crores (equivalent to ₹694 in 2023 – USD93.7 million). The 450-metre (1,480 ft) eastbound flank of the flyover, which directly connects AJC Bose Road Flyover with the flyover from Exide Side to EM Bypass, was opened in August 2016 while the west bound flank of the flyover connecting it to AJC Bose Road Flyover was opened in February 2019. Other than a 684.31-metre (2,245 ft 1 in) stretch constructed by Larsen & Toubro, the flyover was constructed by Hindustan Construction Company.

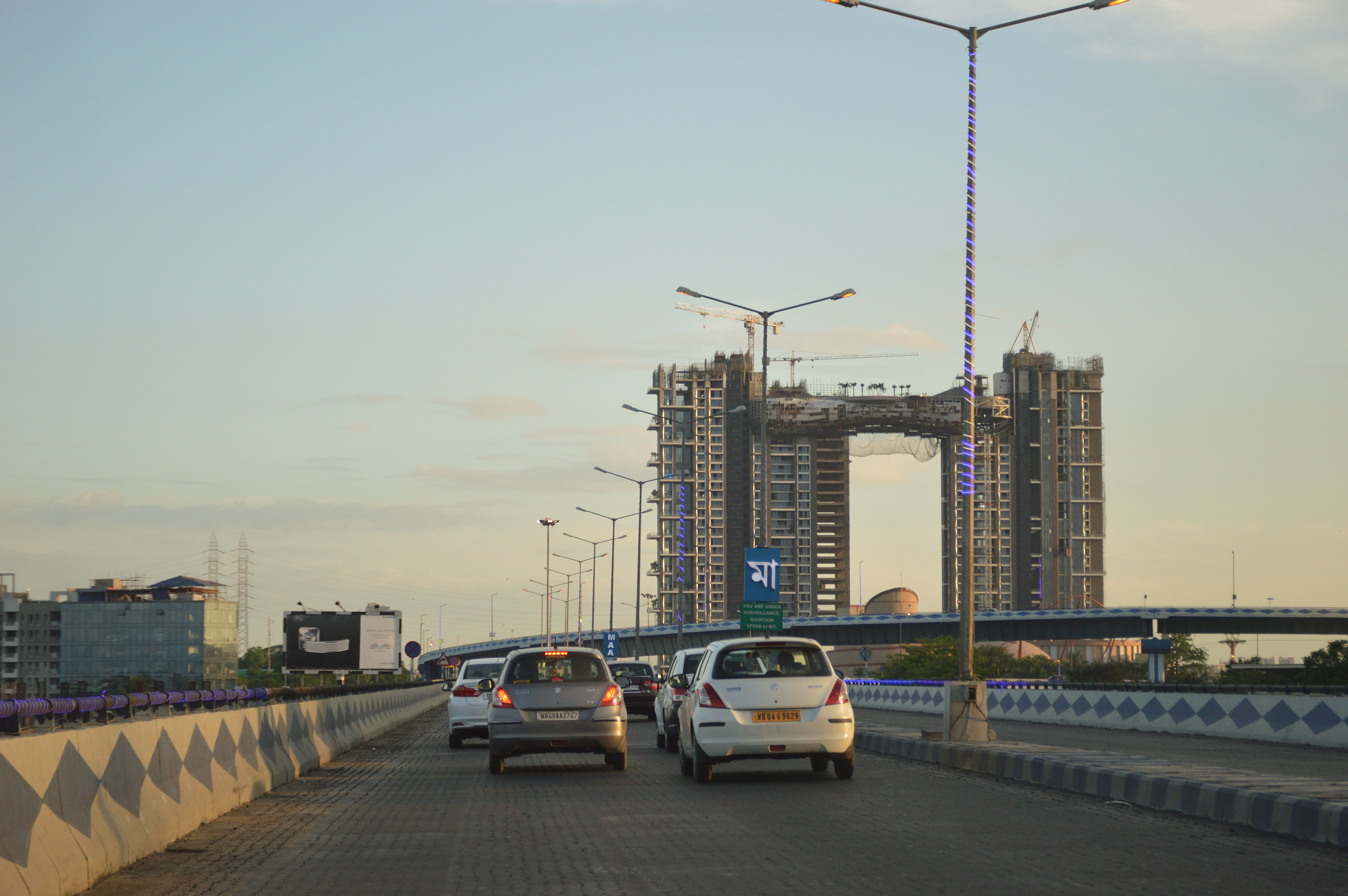
View of Forum Atmosphere from Maa Flyover

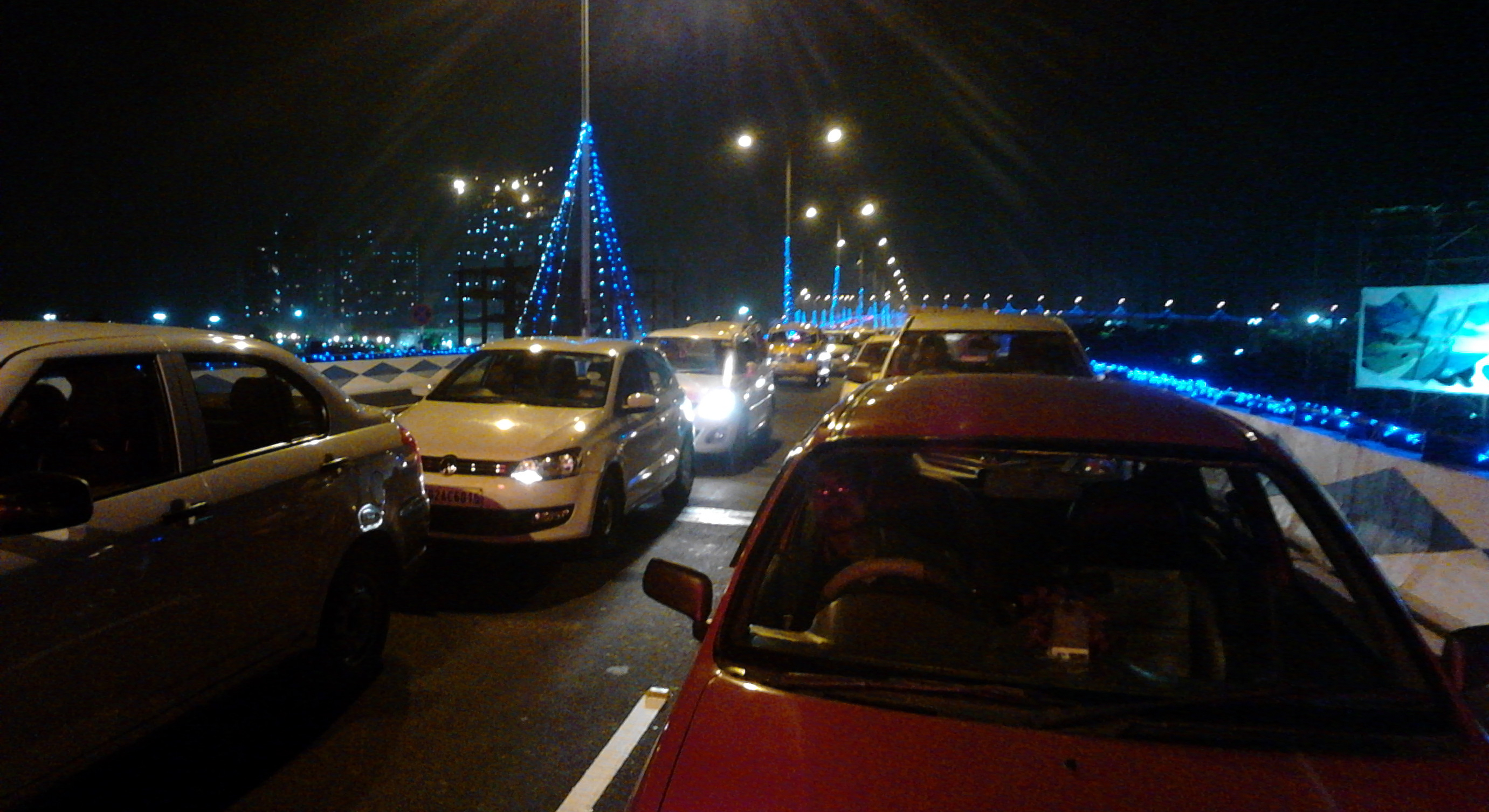
Maa Flyover Night View

== Route timings and restrictions ==
The flyover which was opened without completion of the flanks connecting AJC Bose Road Flyover, resulted in massive traffic jams after initial inauguration. With the pressure mounting Kolkata Police was forced to temporarily shut down the flyover for few hours. After initial discussion, Kolkata Police devised a solution allowing only one-way traffic (during certain time of the day) as an interim solution until the connecting flanks were completed.

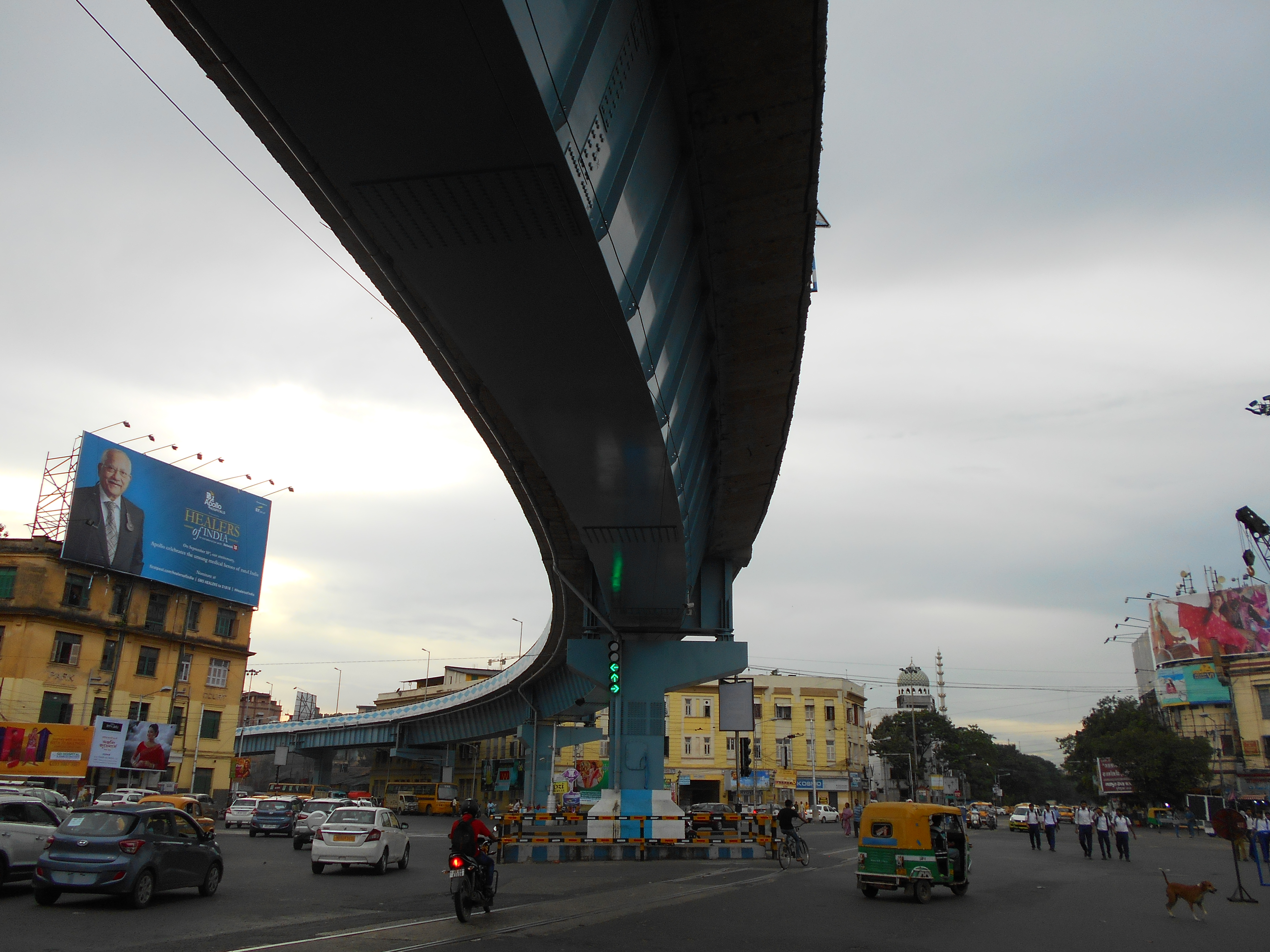
Maa Flyover View From Park Circus 7-Point

Timings from 27 October 2015 to August 2016:

- Whole Day — Both ways Open.
- From 10 pm to 6 am — Two Wheeler Not Allowed

The flyover is also closed for heavy vehicles including buses and trucks, auto-rickshaws and pedestrian traffic.

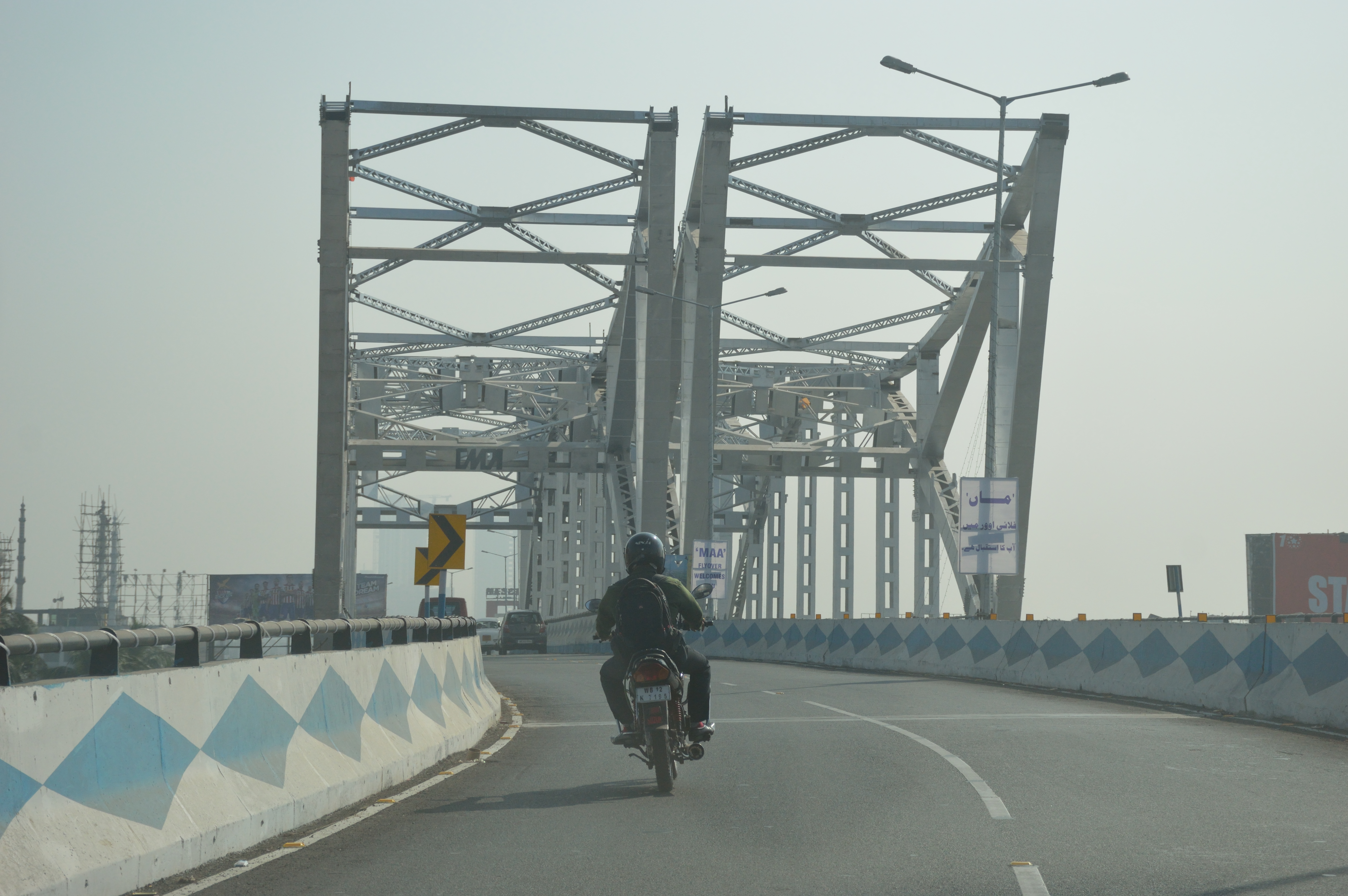
Maa Flyover above Park Circus 4 no Railway Overbridge

From 9 February 2019, after the inauguration of the flank from Maa Flyover to AJC Bose Road Flyover, traffic moves both ways with other restrictions still in law. It now directly connects from Science City to Victoria Memorial.
