= When Weather Changed History =

American documentary television series (2008–2009)

- Genre: Documentary
- Country of origin: United States
- No. of seasons: 2
- No. of episodes: 24

Production
- Running time: 60 minutes
- Production company: Towers Productions

Original release
- Network: The Weather Channel
- Release: January 6, 2008 – February 25, 2009

When Weather Changed History is an American documentary television series that aired on The Weather Channel from January 6, 2008, to February 25, 2009. It chronicles major events in history and the effect weather had on them.

== Program History ==
When Weather Changed History premiered on January 6, 2008, with the first episode focusing on the space shuttle Challenger explosion. The series premiered with record high ratings for its first season of 10 episodes. As a result, a second season consisting of 14 episodes was ordered. Season 2 premiered on October 5, 2008.

The last episode of When Weather Changed History aired on February 25, 2009. Currently reruns can be seen, however, the current fate of the program is unknown at this time. In December 2010, The Weather Channel aired a week's worth of Viewer's Choice episodes at 8 p.m. ET.

As of October 2026, TWC airs reruns of the series on Saturday mornings at 5 and 6 a.m. ET.

TWC launched a similar series, Weather That Changed the World, on June 9, 2013. The show covered three stories that had aired on When Weather Changed History - the Challenger tragedy, the Titanic and the Hindenberg..In addition, the 1948 smog that hit Donora, Pennsylvania - which When Weather Changed History had covered - was shown in one episode, along with the 1952 London smog

== Episode list ==
Season	Episodes	Originally released	
Season	Episodes	First released	Last released
1	10	January 6, 2008	March 23, 2008
2	14	October 5, 2008	February 25, 2009

=== Season 1 (2008) ===
No. overall	No. in season	Title	Original release date
1	1	"The Challenger Disaster"	January 6, 2008
2	2	"Battle of the Bulge"	January 13, 2008
3	3	"Air Florida Potomac Crash"	January 20, 2008
4	4	"Operation Eagle Claw"	January 27, 2008
5	5	"Rescue from the South Pole"	February 10, 2008
6	6	"Dunkirk"	February 28, 2008
7	7	"Delta 191 Crash"	March 2, 2008
8	8	"The Great Mississippi Flood"	March 9, 2008
9	9	"Coast Guard Rescue"	March 16, 2008
10	10	"Race to Nome"	March 23, 2008

=== Season 2 (2008–09) ===
No. overall	No. in season	Title	Original release date
11	1	"Galveston Hurricane"	October 5, 2008
12	2	"The Great Chicago Fire"	October 12, 2008
13	3	"Titanic"	October 19, 2008
14	4	"Hindenburg"	October 26, 2008
15	5	"Killer Smog"	November 2, 2008
16	6	"Dust Bowl"	November 30, 2008
17	7	"D-Day"	December 7, 2008
18	8	"Drowning the Heartland (Iowa flood of 2008)"	December 14, 2008
19	9	"Nagasaki"	January 4, 2009
20	10	"Hurricane Katrina"	January 12, 2009
21	11	"Deadly Heat (Chicago, IL 1995)"	January 18, 2009
22	12	"Washington's Weather"	January 25, 2009
23	13	"Greentown (May 2007 tornado outbreak)"	February 22, 2009
24	14	"1974 Super Outbreak"	February 25, 2009
