= Continuum season 4 =

Continuum
- Season 4
- DVD cover art
- No. of episodes: 6

Release
- Original network: Showcase
- Original release: September 4 – October 9, 2015

Season chronology
- ← Previous; Season 3

The fourth and final season of the Showcase television series Continuum was officially ordered on December 8, 2014. The season was originally slated to premiere on July 26, 2015, but was pushed back, and premiered on September 4, 2015, on Showcase Canada. The fourth season, and the series, concluded on October 9, 2015.

The premiere episode was released online by Showcase on August 21, 2015. The series was created by Simon Barry, and centers on Kiera Cameron (Rachel Nichols) as she time travels from 2077 to 2012 in pursuit of a group of terrorists, attempting to find a way home. All episode titles in this season use the word "Hour".

== Cast and characters ==
=== Regular ===
- Rachel Nichols as Kiera Cameron
- Victor Webster as Carlos Fonnegra
- Erik Knudsen as Alec Sadler
- William B. Davis as future Alec Sadler
- Stephen Lobo as Matthew Kellog
- Roger Cross as Travis Verta
- Luvia Petersen as Jasmine Garza
- Omari Newton as Lucas Ingram
- Brian Markinson as Inspector Jack Dillon
- Ryan Robbins as Brad Tonkin
- Terry Chen as Curtis Chen

=== Recurring ===
- Richard Harmon as Julian Randol
- Ian Tracey as Jason Sadler
- Magda Apanowicz as Emily / Maya Hartwell
- Kyra Zagorsky as Vasquez
- Michael Eklund as Zorin
- Ty Olsson as Marcellus
- Aleks Paunovic as Rollins
- Lisa Berry as Nolan
- Garfield Wilson as Weaver

== Episodes ==
No. overall	No. in season	Title	Directed by	Written by	Original release date
37	1	"Lost Hours"	Patrick Williams	Simon Barry	September 4, 2015
Brad and Kiera are pursued by the heavily armed soldiers who appeared seeking the beacon; Brad identifies them as his companions from the future. Kiera is knocked unconscious and experiences a simulation of her son created by her CMR's psychiatric programming, which makes her realize that she wants nothing more than to return home. Brad rejoins the unit led by Marcellus, but they are suspicious of his relationship with Kiera, one of their targets. At Piron, Curtis tries to convince Kellog to ally himself with the Traveler. Alec and Lucas hack the Piron servers with Julian's help. When Kiera sneaks into the building where Marcellus's unit is hiding and steals a piece of their technology, she is discovered, and Marcellus throws her off a building, but with her suit and Garza's intervention she survives. Elsewhere, Emily is kidnapped by unknown men. Later, Curtis and the Traveler approach Garza to encourage her to target Kellog. At the end of the episode, Kellog receives a video message from his future self.
38	2	"Rush Hour"	Patrick Williams	Shelley Eriksen	September 11, 2015
Kellog's message from the future warns of economic collapse, and asks him to fund the soldiers and trust his future self's plan; it is revealed that Kellog had Emily kidnapped to blackmail Alec into returning control of the Piron servers. Alec worries about Kellog controlling all of the pieces to understanding time travel. Marcellus refuses to give Kellog any further information about the plan, leaving Kellog unsatisfied. Although Kiera and Brad meet, they agree to stay on opposite sides, with the excuse of trading information. When Carlos visits Piron to pressure Kellog about Emily's kidnapping, he learns that Dillon has signed on with Piron's security, leaving Carlos as VPD Inspector. Alec, Lucas, and Jason plant a virus in the Piron data before returning it, then Alec finds out where Emily is being held and goes after her himself. Kiera has lunch with Kellog to return the data and gets caught in an attack planned by Travis and Garza, leading Carlos to get involved, and Lucas has to talk Kiera through saving Kellog's life. With Dillon's help, Carlos arrests Travis, but Garza returns with Kiera. Emily pressures Jason until he admits that she is not his mother. Upset, Emily leaves, saying she is Alec's weakness.
39	3	"Power Hour"	David Frazee	Jeremy Smith & Todd Ireland	September 18, 2015
Carlos warns Kiera not to trust Brad. Meanwhile, Brad is still taking heat from fellow soldier Zorin, although Marcellus defends him. In an attempt to change his destiny, Julian burns the draft of the Theseus Manifesto. Alec offers to take over Betty's job at the department, and Kiera asks him not to tell Carlos if he finds the soldiers. Julian and Lucas find out that someone else has published the Theseus Manifesto online, and when Julian investigates he finds Curtis with a young Edouard Kagame and Kagame's mother; Curtis tells Julian to create his legacy without letting it be controlled by fanatics. When Kiera and Garza try to sneak into the soldiers' warehouse, Alec identifies the soldiers' project as an anti-matter fusion system that can power time travel. The two are discovered, and despite Lucas's reluctance, he goes in to help them get out, killing Marcellus. Brad kills Lucas, then lets Kiera and Garza walk out. Zorin takes command of the mission. Later, Alec tells Julian that the Theseus Manifesto is beautiful, and people need to see it. The episode ends with Julian returning to the Kagame house.
40	4	"Zero Hour"	David Frazee	Jonathan Lloyd Walker	September 25, 2015
Jason tells Alec what he told Emily, and Alec says that he is no longer the same man as Jason's father. When Brad gives Kiera the address to a storage facility, Carlos and Kiera investigate and find a dialysis machine. Jason shows Alec his mother, and Alec gets her number, even though he's not supposed to meet her yet. Later, Curtis explains to Kiera and Alec that the Traveler's job was to minimize the effects of time travel, but that he changed something and erased his own future, and he's been trying to repair everything. The Traveler sends Alec forward in time, where he encourages his older self that time travel is possible and gives him the name Kiera Cameron, setting the events of the series premiere in motion; but he also learns that his older self pushed his wife to suicide. Kellog learns that his older self needs him for a kidney transplant. Zorin says that the machine is a life boat to bring people from the future back to this time, including Brad's family; Alec calls it a wormhole, and says it could also send people to the future.
41	5	"The Desperate Hours"	Patrick Williams	Shelley Eriksen	October 2, 2015
Carlos is still holding Travis without charges. Meanwhile, Alec and Kiera meet with Kellog to make a plan to access the wormhole. Kiera offers Brad the chance to return to the life he lost as well, and agrees to give him back the key. Dillon gives Carlos a recording of Emily and Kellog conspiring to kill Escher, saying that it's time he tried to do the right thing. Brad's questions lead Kiera to recognize the possibility that her future, and her son, may not exist even if she goes back. In the warehouse, Zorin tells Brad that it's impossible to configure the wormhole to travel forward in time. Carlos arrests Kellog just when Kiera needs him, and accuses Kiera of starting a selfish, suicidal mission. When Brad and the soldiers come to break out Kellog, Brad leaves with both Kellog and the key, while Travis sacrifices himself protecting Carlos.
42	6	"Final Hour"	Patrick Williams	Simon Barry	October 9, 2015
Zorin uses the key to power the time machine, tethering the two timelines together and bringing three soldiers through before the key short-circuits. Brad, learning that the plan is an invasion rather than a life boat for their families, decides to help Kiera. Seeing his resolve, Kiera decides to destroy the machine rather than use it. Kellog offers Vasquez the chance to be his queen, and kills her when she refuses, learning too late that she is his own daughter. While the VPD force struggles against a soldier in a power suit, Alec is taken hostage and forced to fix the key. Kellog kills Dillan and enters the wormhole with the Piron time travel device, eliminating his future and the waiting army. Kiera enters it with Alec's time travel device, while the Traveler also returns to his own time. Alec, Carlos, Curtis, Brad, Jason and Garza swear to ensure a better future, hoping that Kiera has survived, and Alec reveals that Kellog's stolen coordinates sent him to the Pre-Columbian era. Kiera appears in front of a cheerful Kagame and is greeted by the same Alec she just left, sixty years older. Alec shows her that the Corporate Congress was never created, but she pays a price for it, seeing Sam only from a distance as the son of the new timeline's Kiera.

== Production ==
Simon Barry revealed that he had 7–10 seasons in mind to tell the entire story of Continuum, while Rachel Nichols hinted that work had begun into season 4 with a new direction for her character Kiera. At first, the renewal of season 4 was expected in July 2014. With months of silence from Showcase, Syfy confirmed on September 26 that they were unlikely to save Continuum should Showcase choose to cancel it. On December 8, 2014, Showcase renewed the show for a final season of six episodes.

Filming of the fourth and final season began on March 26, 2015.

== Broadcast ==
Continuum's premiere episode was released online by Showcase on August 21, 2015. The fourth season began airing on Syfy on September 11, 2015.

=== Ratings ===
Viewership and ratings per episode of Continuum season 4
No.	Title	Air date	Rating/share (18–49)	Viewers (millions)
1	"Lost Hours"	September 4, 2015	0.11	0.459
2	"Rush Hour"	September 11, 2015	0.15	0.424
3	"Power Hour"	September 18, 2015	0.16	0.526
4	"Zero Hour"	September 25, 2015	0.10	0.331
5	"The Desperate Hours"	October 2, 2015	0.14	0.374
6	"Final Hour"	October 9, 2015	0.10	0.347

== Reviews ==
Kristof Stevenson of Superior Realities gave a positive review of the first episode, giving it a score of 8.1 out of 10. He commented that the shorter season allows the episode to never dull and called Emily's fight scene "one of the best fight sequences [he'd] ever seen." On TV.com, MaryAnn Sleasman wrote that the series finale was "phenomenal" and "bittersweet in the best possible way."

Merill Barr of Forbes said, "The action is solid, and watching Rachel Nichols run around in her futuristic super suit is just as entertaining as its always been."
