= National Design Centre =

Centre for promoting design in Singapore

Coordinates: 1°17′56.16″N 103°51′11.04″E

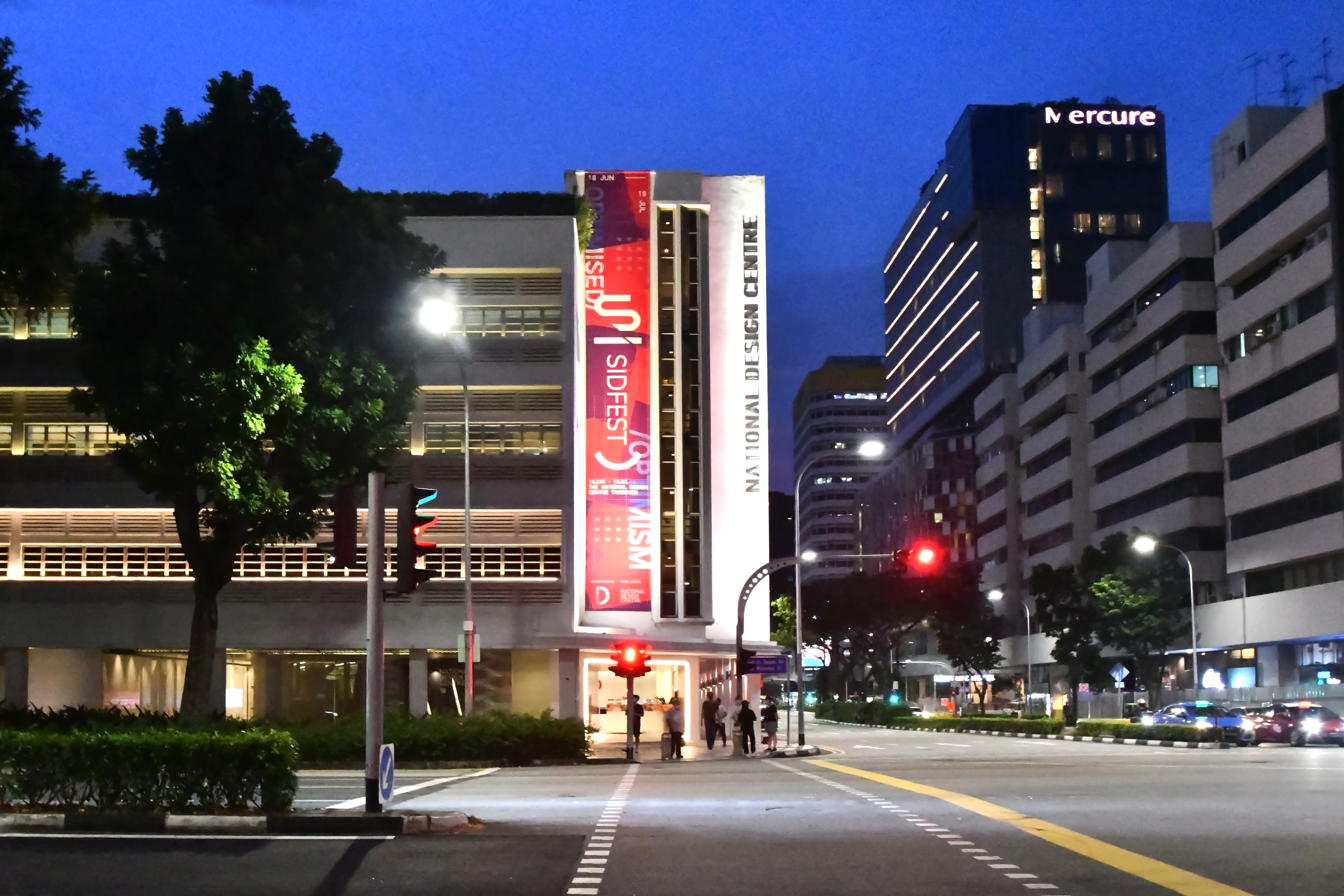
The National Design Centre in August 2021.

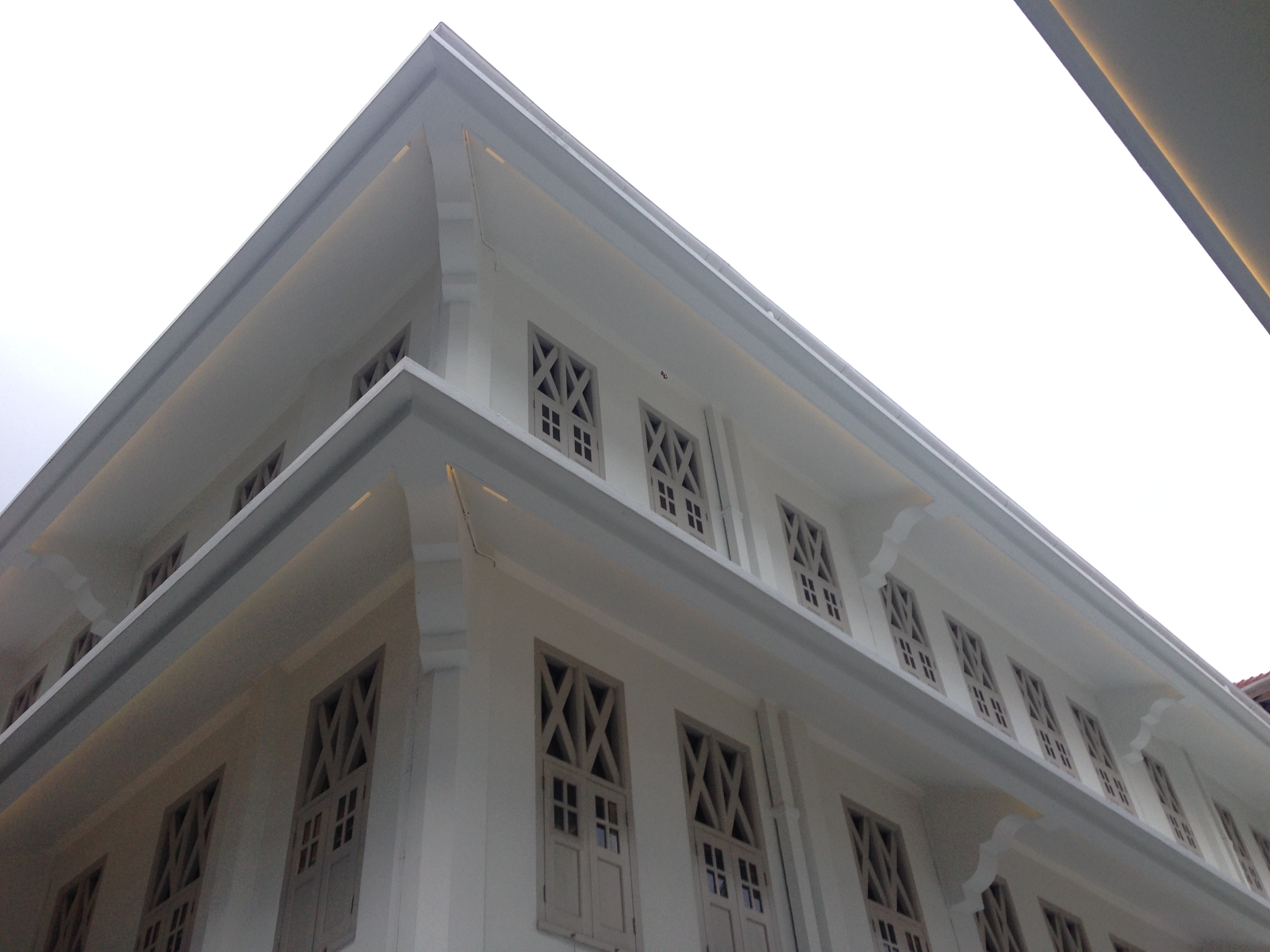
The former Saint Anthony's Convent on Middle Road, which is now home to the National Design Centre. The DesignSingapore Council has its headquarters here.

The National Design Centre of Singapore is located in the arts, cultural, learning and entertainment district of Bras Basah–Bugis. The complex is a focal point for all things design in Singapore and a space where designers and businesses can exhibit their products, exchange ideas, and even work. It also invites the public to learn about design through its exhibitions and programmes.

The centre has two galleries and houses three design labs – IDA Labs, the Materials Design Lab, and the Prototyping Lab.

The NDC occupies the 120-year-old premises of the former St Anthony's Convent. The development of the NDC involved the restoration and adaptive reuse of the conserved buildings, consisting of three pre–World War II Art Deco blocks and one post-war modern block.

The NDC is also home to the DesignSingapore Council, which was formed in 2003 as the national agency for design under the Economic Development Board. The Council develops the design sector, and helps Singapore to use design for innovation and growth, making lives better.
