= The Troika (Kuala Lumpur) =

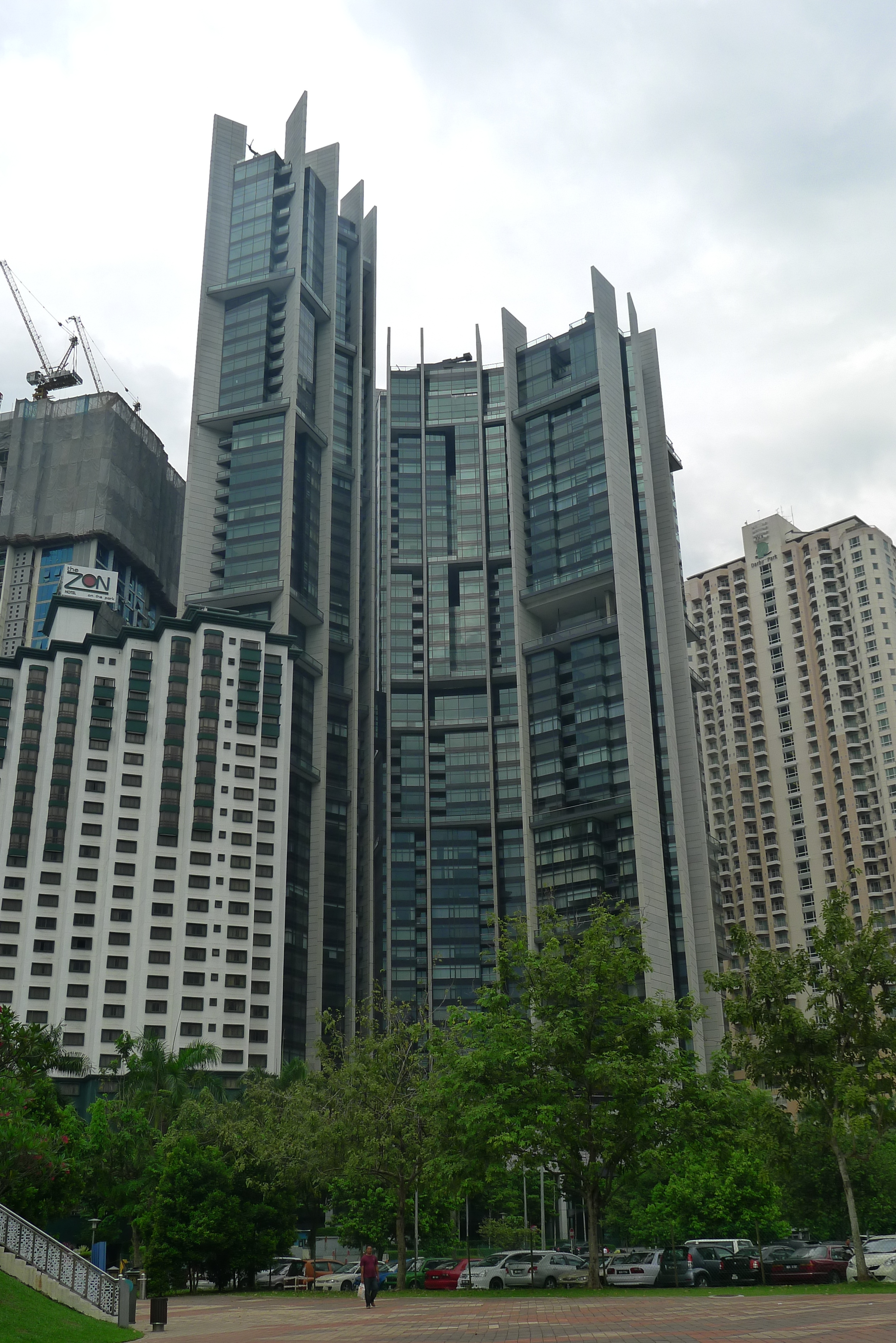
- The Troika (at center), viewed from KLCC Park.
- Interactive map of the The Troika area

General information
- Type: Residential
- Location: Jalan Binjai; Kuala Lumpur, Malaysia
- Coordinates: 3.15466°N 101.71797°E
- Construction started: 2006
- Completed: 2010
- Cost: RM840 million

Height
- Roof: Tower 1: 160 m (520 ft); Tower 2 177 m (581 ft); Tower 3 204.2 m (670 ft)

Technical details
- Floor count: 50

Design and construction
- Architect: Foster and Partners
- Developer: Bandar Raya Developments Berhad
- Structural engineer: Web Structures

The Troika is a three-tower, luxury condominium development in Kuala Lumpur, Malaysia, located at the corner of Jalan Binjai and Persiaran KLCC, opposite PNB Darby Park, behind Menara Citibank and Intercontinental Hotel.

It was developed by Malaysian property developer, Bandar Raya Developments Berhad and designed by the British firm Foster and Partners. The tower is accessible from Persiaran KLCC MRT station.

== Architecture ==
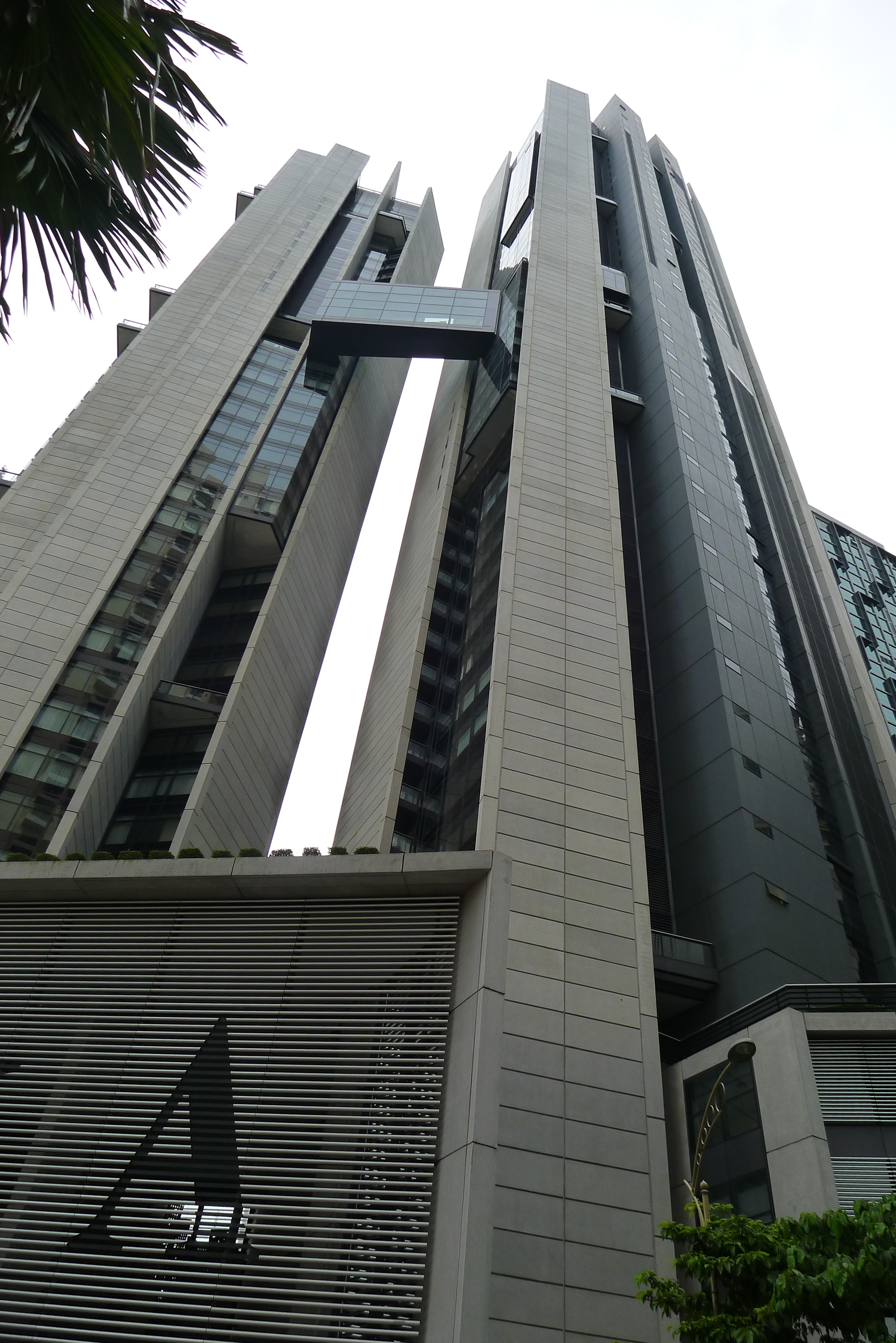
Viewed from street level at Jalan Binjai, Kuala Lumpur.

The Troika was completed in 2010, and features three glass-clad towers of varying heights. The three towers will surround a park located in the middle. The three towers are: 160 m (520 ft) with 38 storeys, 177 m (581 ft) with 44 storeys, and 204 m (669 ft) with 50 storeys. The Troika also features two double-volume glass-encased bridges connecting a sky lobby which spans the three towers at the 24th floor.

Other components of The Troika development comprise small office home offices (SOHO), boutique offices, retail spaces and restaurants.

== Awards ==
- Cityscape Best Developer Award 2008
- CNBC Asia Pacific Property Awards 2008 - 5 Star Best High Rise Residential and 5 Star Best Architectural

== See also ==
- List of tallest buildings in Kuala Lumpur
