= Atmosfear =

Atmosfear may refer to:

- Atmosfear (series), an Australian horror video board game series launched in 1991
- Atmosfear (band), a British jazz funk band formed in 1979.
- AtmosFear (Liseberg), an amusement park ride which opened in Gothenburg, Sweden, in 2011
- AtmosFEAR (Morey's Piers), an amusement park ride which opened in New Jersey, US, in 2005
- AtmosFear, the engine used for the Carnivores game series and other titles by Ukrainian video game developer Action Forms
