= Marcin Rozynek =

Polish singer

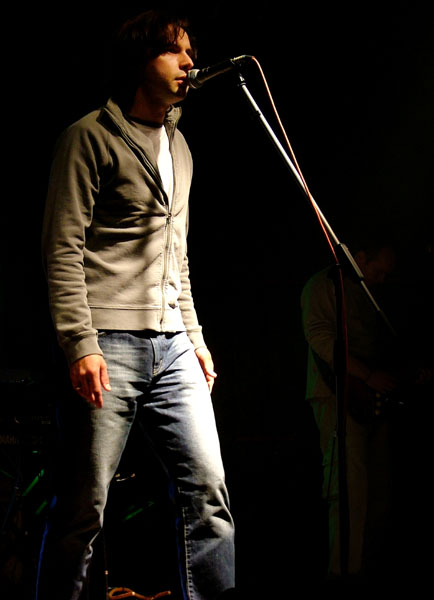
- Marcin Rozynek in 2004

Background information
- Born: Marcin Rozynek; 16 May 1971 (age 55)
- Origin: Żywiec, Poland
- Genres: Rock, pop
- Occupations: Singer-songwriter, musician, record producer
- Years active: 1989–present
- Labels: Sony Music Entertainment Poland, Sony BMG Music Entertainment Poland, EMI Music Poland
- Member of: Atmosphere
- Website: www.rozynek.pl

Marcin Rozynek (born 16 May 1971 in Żywiec) is a Polish rock vocalist, songwriter, and music producer. He has released six albums, two of them recorded with the band Atmosphere. He has also cooperated with Grzegorz Ciechowski.

== Career ==
Marcin Rozynek began his music career in the bands Esther 1989 and Książę i Esther 1992.

He appeared on the music scene as the vocalist of Atmosphere, established in 1993 in Leszno. In 1994 the group appeared at Mokotowska Jesień Muzyczna, where they were runners-up just behind Myslovitz. Two years later they won the competition Marlboro Rock In. In 1997, Atmosphere released their eponymous debut album, Atmosphere, and in 1999 released Europa Naftowa. Atmosphere were awarded the Debut Album of the Year 1997 by Tylko Rock magazine and were nominated for a Fryderyk award in 1998 in the category Debut of the Year. In 1998, Atmosphere appeared at the National Festival of Polish Song in Opole with the song Niewielki Skrawek Ziemi.

In 2000, Marcin Rozynek met Grzegorz Ciechowski who undertook to release his first solo album. Work on Księga Urodzaju started in November 2001. At the beginning of December, Grzegorz Ciechowski got first effects of their cooperation, the end of the work was planned from January to February 2002. After Grzegorz Ciechowski's death, work on the album was finished by Leszek Biolik. Księga Urodzaju contains 11 songs, produced by Grzegorz Ciechowski and Leszek Biolik. Grzegorz Ciechowski also plays keyboard instruments. Najlepsze, first single from the album, promoted Show, film of Maciej Ślesicki and Teraz albo nigdy!, soap opera being displayed now. The premiere of debutant's album Księga Urodzaju was on 12 May 2003.

The next album of the artist, named Następny Będziesz Ty, was released in October 2004. It was continuation of Księga Urodzaju in a big way. Big influence on the final form of the album was by Leszek Kamiński, who also participated in production of the Rozynek's first one. In the album's last song Wiem co Piotr Wojtasik played the trumpet. As a bonus to the album was added song Nick of Time, written with a view to Eurovision Song Contest 2004. In 2004 Marcin Rozynek appeared at the National Festival of Polish Song in Opole in a competition of premiers with song Następny będziesz ty.

Marcin Rozynek was awarded the Fryderyk in 2004 in category Vocalist of the Year, was nominated to this award in 2005, was awarded the Superjedynka in 2004 in Opole, was awarded as the Artist of the Year the Eska Music Award and was nominated to this award in categories Hit of the Year – Poland and Album of the Year. Rozynek was also twice awarded the Mikrofon Popcornu as Vocalist of the Year in 2004 and 2005.

Third Marcin Rozynek's solo album named On-Off was released in December 2006. It's mainly acoustic-guitar album, somewhere combined with stylish electronic sounds and power of poetry. It was inspired by music of artists like Dave Matthews Band and Travis. In 2006, Rozynek took part in Opole's competition of premiers with song Historia miłosna '06. In 2007, Rozynek took part for the third time in Opole competition of premiers with song Pierwsze strony gazet. In 2008, he qualified for the Sopot International Song Festival with song Nigdy nie patrz w dół. Ubieranie do snu was released on 9 February 2009.

== Private life ==
He spend his childhood in Radziechowy near Żywiec. He attended High School No. 2 in Leszno and studied law in University of Wrocław. His wife's name is Wioletta and they have three children: Filip, Juliusz and Helena.

== Discography ==
Title	Album details	Peak chart positions
Title	Album details	POL
Księga Urodzaju	Released: 12 May 2003; Label: Sony Music Entertainment Poland; Formats: CD	10
Następny Będziesz Ty	Released: 7 October 2004; Label: Sony Music Entertainment Poland; Formats: CD	25
On-Off	Released: 11 September 2006; Label: Sony BMG Music Entertainment Poland; Formats: CD	25
Ubieranie do snu	Released: 9 February 2009; Label: Sony BMG Music Entertainment Poland; Formats: CD, digital download	47
Second Hand	Released: 25 September 2012; Label: EMI Music Poland; Formats: CD, digital download	—
"—" denotes a recording that did not chart or was not released in that territory.
