= Atmosphere (Kolkata) =

High-rise building in Kolkata, India

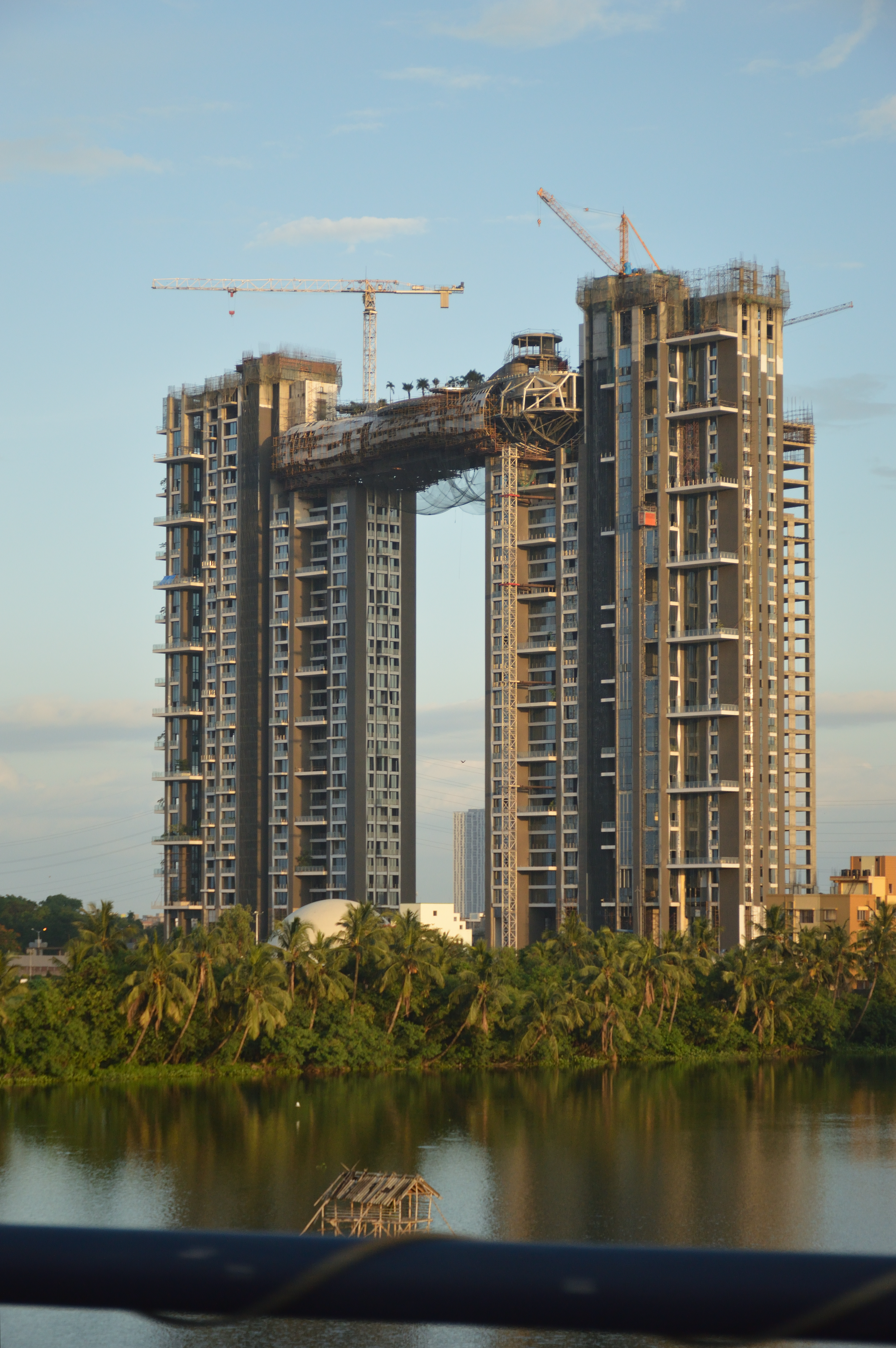
- Forum Atmosphere

General information
- Type: Residential
- Location: Mirania Gardens, East Topsia, EM Bypass, Kolkata, West Bengal, India
- Construction started: 2011
- Completed: 2021
- Owner: Rahul Saraf

Height
- Height: 152 metres (499 ft)

Technical details
- Floor count: 39

Design and construction
- Architect: ARC Studio
- Developer: Forum Group/Forum Projects Pvt Ltd
- Structural engineer: Hossein Rezai, Web Structures

Atmosphere is a luxury residential superstructure in Kolkata, India. Atmosphere consists of two tall towers and a 'Deya', the world's first residential floating sky sculpture.

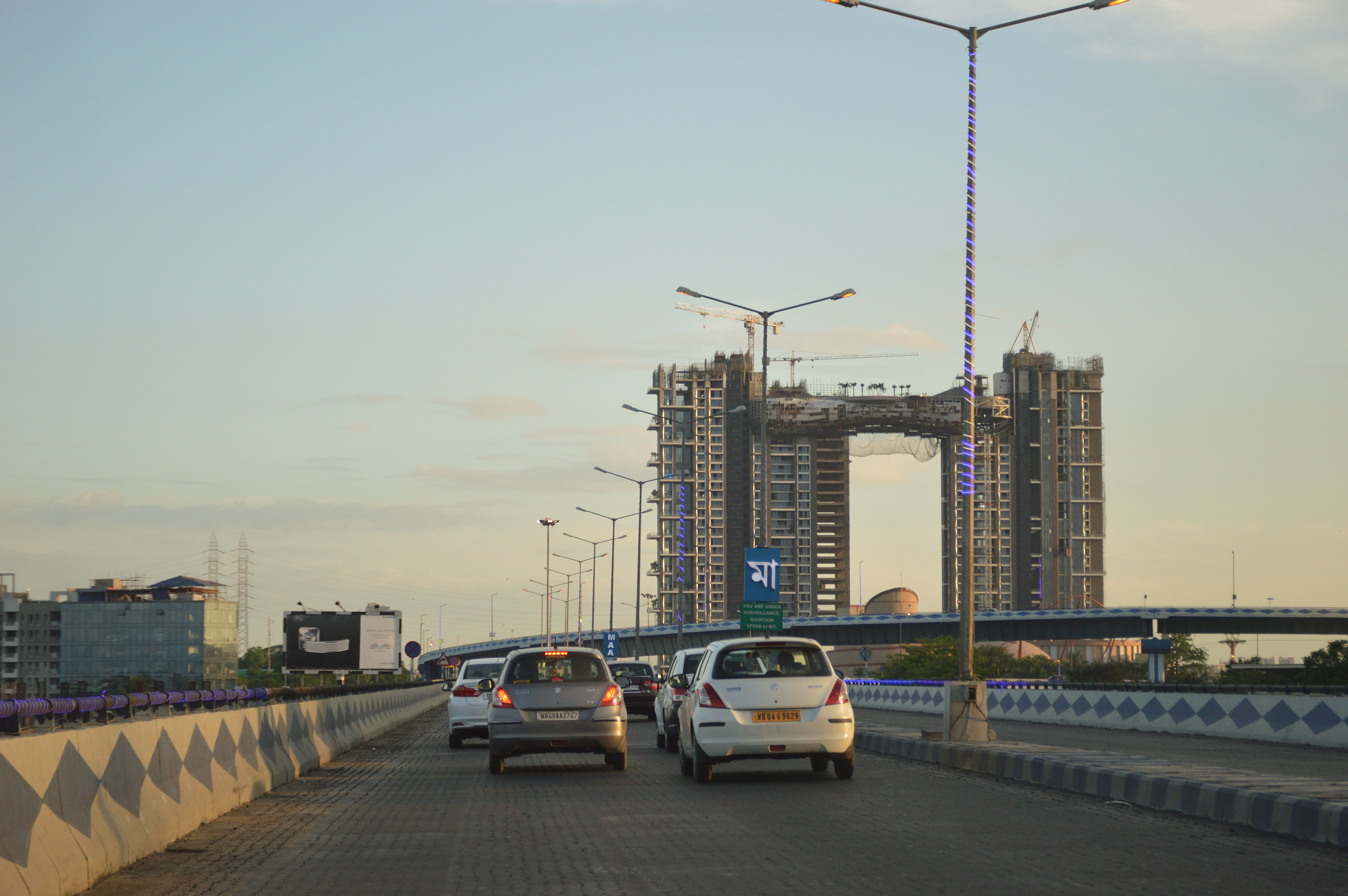
View of Forum Atmosphere from Maa Flyover

== Deya ==
Sitting 500 ft in the air, 'Deya' connects the two towers that make up Atmosphere. Deya houses club facilities for the residents of Atmosphere. Initially conceived as a cloud changing in porosity and form, Deya is not a physical extension of the tower as such, since the majority of the spaces within are open air. The skin is composed of expanded mesh panels wrapped around structural ribs. Special panels carrying shimmering mobile reflective disks are scattered across this mesh. The porosity of these materials enables Deya to appear different in form depending on how it is lit. The Deya will house the residents' community and recreational facilities, including a swimming pool, gymnasium, spas, running track, sporting facilities, virtual golf, cinema, meeting spaces and function facilities.

== Other ==
Atmosphere featured in Nat Geo's Superstructures documentary series.

== See also ==
- List of tallest buildings in Kolkata
