= Atmosphere (Polish band) =

- Origin: Poland
- Genres: Rock
- Years active: 1993 - current
- Label: Sony Music

Atmosphere is a rock band established in 1993 in Leszno, Poland. In 1997 they published their first album. After two decades or relative inactivity, they released more albums in the 2020s.

Marcin Rozynek was a member of Atmosphere until 2000.

== Discography ==
- Atmosphere (1997)
- Europa Naftowa (1999)

== Members ==
- Waldemar Dąże - g
- Dariusz Matuszewski - dr
- Marcin Rozynek - voc, g
- Łukasz Wachowiak - bg
- Aleksander Wnukowski - kbds
