= Atmosphere (service) =

Over-the-Top Video On-Demand Service

Atmosphere.TV or simply Atmosphere is a global over-the-top video on-demand service, headquartered in Austin, Texas, that provides audio-optional video content in a business-to-business capacity.

As a video streaming service, Atmosphere produces its own content and curates third-party content alongside media partners including Red Bull TV.

Atmosphere provides a streaming TV device free-of-charge that businesses can use on their current TVs. The video service is provided at no cost to the business venue, as the service is supported through advertising revenue. Atmosphere customers can select the topic or topics of video content shown to their clientele, as the service hosts a variety of entertainment content, as well as a News channel, Atmosphere News.

Atmosphere customers include Taco Bell, Burger King, Meineke Car Care Centers, Westin Hotels & Resorts, other national and global chains, medical offices, gyms, bars, airports and casinos.

== History ==
Atmosphere was initially incubated under Chive Media Group, an entertainment-focused company founded in 2008 by brothers John Resig and Leo Resig. The media company is best known for its flagship entertainment website, theCHIVE.com, and its affiliated charity, Chive Charities.

Atmosphere spun off from Chive Media Group in 2019 under the legal name of Rarified Atmosphere, Inc., with an initial launch of five channels, aimed primarily at bar and restaurant audiences.

Atmosphere now includes more than 60 channels — including both self-produced and partner-produced media. It serves customers across more than ≈ 50,000 venues.

Atmosphere’s platform now streams in approximately 60,000 locations with 75,000+ TV screens, including international expansion to over 5,000 venues in 38 countries such as Canada and Europe.

== Funding ==
As of the end of 2021, Atmosphere has raised a total of $143 million since its spin off from Chive Media Group in 2019. Atmosphere received $18 million in Series A funding in 2019 / 2020, $25 million of Series B funding in April 2021 at a post-money valuation of $275 million. In December 2021, Atmosphere raised $100 million: $80 million in Series C funding and $20 million of debt.

== Partnerships ==
Among the most notable former partners of Atmosphere's is the video-focused social networking service, TikTok. Announced in January 2022, the partnership involved Atmosphere's editors curating videos and video compilations for the channel after receiving approval from each video's creator, then appending optional audio.

Other partnerships have included Red Bull TV, FITE, X Games, America's Funniest Home Videos, the estate of Bob Ross, and Geeks Who Drink.

== Awards ==
Over its history, Atmosphere has received numerous awards and accolades that note its innovativeness, including:

- Digiday's "Best Connected TV Platform"
- Fast Company's "The 10 most innovative companies in video in 2022"
- Forbes' "Next Billion Dollar Companies 2022"
