= The Chive =

Website

- Website type: photoblog and entertainment website
- Owner: Resignation Media LLC
- Creators: Leo Resig and John Resig
- Website: thechive.com
- Launched: 2008
- Current status: Online

The Chive (styled theCHIVE) is a website owned and operated by Resignation, LLC. Images appearing on thechive.com are selected by staff from searches of both international and domestic websites as well as daily submissions.

The Chive gained attention for a series of internet hoaxes that began in 2007 and were reported as true stories by mainstream media outlets.

== History ==
John and Leo Resig founded Resignation Media, LLC in August 2007 and then launched thechive.com in November, 2008. Initially, it was claimed that the website's name came from combining 'Chicago' and 'Venice' Beach; however, Resig later admitted that the name was actually inspired by The Onion. The brothers went on to create additional photo-entertainment websites, all of which are staffed and managed by members of the Resig family.

On Monday, July 22, 2013 the Austin American-Statesman reported that during the summer of 2013 the parent company of The Chive, Resignation Media, was relocating to a renovated space in downtown Austin, Texas.

On August 2025, The Chive announces they completely remove its "Hotness" category from the main site. The decision was driven by a shift in business strategy and heavy pressure from advertisers.

== Hoaxes ==
Between 2007 and 2010, Leo and John Resig conducted a string of internet hoaxes that, according to Leo, were designed "to entertain and inspire, not to inform."

=== Donald Trump tips ===
In 2007, the "Donald Trump tip" hoax involved a doctored photo of a Santa Monica restaurant receipt that was supposedly signed by Donald Trump indicating that a $10,000 tip was left on a bill of $82.27. Trump denied the story's accuracy to Fox News Channel, which had originally published the story as real. Other media agencies also ran the story, including The Huffington Post, E! News, and Access Hollywood.

=== Teenage texting disaster ===
The "teenage texting disaster" hoax occurred in 2008 and involved a fictitious teenager who had accidentally sent a text message to her father stating that she had lost her virginity on the beach. This became an Internet meme and was broadcast as a true story by several media outlets.

=== Jenny quits on dry erase board ===
Arguably the most famous hoax was in 2010, with "Girl quits her job on dry erase board, emails entire office", which showed several photographs of a woman quitting her job by telling a story with a dry-erase whiteboard. This hoax was also reported as true.

The next day, The Chive ran a follow-up series of photos revealing the woman's true identity as a hired actress named Elyse Porterfield. Some news sources suggested the hoax was inspired by the dramatic resignation of JetBlue flight-attendant Steven Slater that took place the day before. However, the Resig brothers told reporters that the idea for the hoax was conceived about a month earlier at a bar in Santa Monica. The pair wrote down the details on paper napkins. The casting for "Jenny" and her photo shoot was conducted a week prior to the JetBlue incident.

== Chive Charities ==
In 2012, Chive Charities was born from the generosity of theCHIVE community and their desire to do good. Chive Charities operates as an independent 501(c)3 nonprofit focused on life-changing grants for Veterans, first responders, military families and those with a rare disease diagnosis, filling the gaps where insurance and other resources have fallen short.

Chive Charities is funded entirely by public donations, mainly through around 3,000 monthly donors who give between $5 - $100 a month. As of October 2026, Chive Charities has provided over $23 million in grants to nearly 800 recipients.

Each week, a new recipient story is released on chivecharities.org and throughout the Chive Charities social media channels, allowing donors to see their donations in action.
