= Continuum season 3 =

Continuum
- Season 3
- American DVD cover art
- No. of episodes: 13

Release
- Original network: Showcase
- Original release: March 16 – June 22, 2014

Season chronology
- ← Previous; Season 2 Next → Season 4

The third season of the Showcase television series Continuum premiered on March 16, 2014 and concluded on June 22, 2014. The series was created by Simon Barry, and centers on Kiera Cameron (Rachel Nichols) as she travels back in time from 2077 to 2012 pursuing a group of terrorists. Kiera is focused on stopping the terrorists, unifying the time line and finding a way back to her time and family. All episode titles in this season use the word "Minute".

== Cast and characters ==
=== Regular ===
- Rachel Nichols as Kiera Cameron
- Victor Webster as Carlos Fonnegra
- Erik Knudsen as Alec Sadler
- Stephen Lobo as Matthew Kellog
- Roger Cross as Travis Verta
- Lexa Doig as Sonya Valentine
- Luvia Petersen as Jasmine Garza
- Omari Newton as Lucas Ingram

=== Recurring ===
- Terry Chen as Curtis Chen
- Brian Markinson as Inspector Dillon
- Ian Tracey as Jason Sadler
- Magda Apanowicz as Emily / Mia Hartwell
- Jennifer Spence as Betty Robertson
- Ryan Robbins as John Doe / Brad Tonkin
- Richard Harmon as Julian Randol

=== Guest ===
- Tony Amendola as Edouard Kagame
- Mike Dopud as Stefan Jaworski

== Episodes ==
At the end of season 2, Kiera and Alec independently time-travel a week into their past, creating a new timeline, and the series follows them into the past. For the sake of simplicity, the Kiera and Alec from the future are here termed "Red", and the Kiera and Alec from the past, "Green", named for the colors Catherine uses to represent each timeline in "Minute by Minute".

| No. overall | No. in season | Title | Directed by | Written by | Original release date |
|---|---|---|---|---|---|
| 24 | 1 | "Minute by Minute" | Pat Williams | Simon Barry | March 16, 2014 |
With help from the Freelancers, Kiera must stop Red Alec from altering history in his quest to save Emily, though she's unsure whether the Freelancers can truly be trusted. As she forms an uneasy truce with Garza, Kiera begins to realise that the Freelancers aren't necessarily the enemy. Kellog's rivalry with Escher takes a drastic turn, which forces Emily to make a difficult choice. Although Red Keira escapes the temporal destruction caused by Alec's actions, Green Keira is found dead in Alec's lab.
| 25 | 2 | "Minute Man" | Pat Williams | Simon Barry | March 23, 2014 |
With two Alecs in one timeline, Red Kiera is faced with a major problem, as the timeline changes more and more by the minute. At the same time, Carlos discovers there are two Keiras, and when a body turns up in Alec's lab, the situation gets worse. With Liber8 reunited, they turn their attention to the Mayor, Jim Martin, and capture him, causing political chaos.
| 26 | 3 | "Minute to Win It" | Pat Williams | Shelley Eriksen | March 30, 2014 |
In an attempt to drastically alter the future, and prevent the corporations from gaining control, Liber8 starts pulling bank heists using remote controlled corporate executives. After Red Kiera and Carlos get caught in a heist, they discover a cop is involved too. Kiera's truce with Garza comes to a sudden and painful end, but not before she discovers a device from yet another future, something even the Freelancers don't recognise. Meanwhile as Red Alec grows closer to Emily, Green Alec discovers the truth about her after he inherits the controlling stake in Piron from his father, Escher.
| 27 | 4 | "A Minute Changes Everything" | William Waring | Denis McGrath | April 6, 2014 |
Kiera and Carlos investigate the deaths of 3 students killed during a student protest in support of Liber8 and discover that an officer had shot the students and that his actions were being covered up by fellow officers at the scene. Meanwhile at Piron Corp Green Alec's first board meeting does not go as he expected, but he then later receives advice from Kellog. During the investigation Carlos discovers that Betty was the mole working for Liber8 and then has her arrested. Alec then asserts his authority at the next board meeting at Piron Corp and offers up several ideas to move the company forward. Later that day Betty is released from custody and is allowed to resume her duties under strict supervision and has to wear an ankle monitor, and is then informed she will be used as bait to catch Liber8. Back at the lab Green Alec comes to face to face with his alternate timeline self after earlier discovering his presence via the security footage from the anti matter lab at Piron Corp. Red Alec then returns to his apartment and discovers Emily there waiting for him.
| 28 | 5 | "30 Minutes to Air" | William Waring | Jonathan Lloyd Walker | April 13, 2014 |
When Dillon's daughter Christine is arrested for her involvement in a protest against Fermitas Corp, her actions are seen by some as being in support of Liber8. Faced with scrutiny in how he deals with her, Dillon appears on a live broadcast of Firing Point with Diana Bolton to reaffirm that she will be treated no different to any other criminal. However, Liber8 take the studio hostage and Travis demands the access codes to the satellites owned by the TV station. Kiera learns that Fermitas Corp own the TV station, and inadvertently reveals to Green Alec that she knew of Red Alecs existence while disarming the explosives placed by Liber8. Meanwhile, with the hostages now rescued, Garza infiltrates Fermitas Corp and steals sensitive data that reveals that they were spying on rival corporations, including Piron Corp. The next day, Dillon comforts his daughter and tells her that he will use his influence to get her a lighter sentence. Together they come up with a plan for her to infiltrate Liber8.
| 29 | 6 | "Wasted Minute" | Amanda Tapping | Jeremy Smith & Matt Venables | April 27, 2014 |
Kiera is left with a difficult choice when the Freelancers inform her that she needs to make a choice over the Alec situation. But when Liber8 carry out a raid on an Evergreen chemical plant, Kiera learns that Liber8 may be planning to use the chemical to create a bioweapon similar to what infected her in 2066. However, when a Liber8 follower protests outside of Sonmanto using the stolen chemical, they learn that Sonmanto were responsible for creating the bioweapon, and that they were planning to sell it to terrorists. At Piron Corp, Kiera intervenes when Red Alec holds his alternate self at gunpoint and forces him to delete the Emily related files from the servers. Meanwhile, Sonya and Travis discuss their future altering actions against Sonmanto Corp, and Sonya decides to recreate the antidote to the bioweapon. Believing she had no other choice, Kiera hands over Red Alec to the Freelancers, who detain him. During the transfer, Kiera learns that Curtis was responsible for killing her alternate self.
| 30 | 7 | "Waning Minutes" | Amanda Tapping | Sam Egan | May 4, 2014 |
This episode takes place prior to the events of the first episode of Season 1 and is based almost entirely in the future. When a routine prisoner transport carrying Stefan Jaworkski crashes, Kiera encounters a group called the "gleaners" who live apart from corporate society. With her CMR knocked offline, and alone, she learns more about the group. Meanwhile Sadtech, believing Kiera to be dead, offer Kiera's husband a compensation package should he absolve Sadtech of all responsibility for the crash. Kagame decides to make his presence at the gleaner encampment known to Alec, who responds by ordering a missile strike against the camp. Believing that the gleaners are about to betray him, Kagame escapes the camp with Sonya after earlier speaking with Kiera in the infirmary. However, Kiera is forced to pursue Stefan when he escapes her custody, and recaptures him when her CMR regains functionality. Sonya watches on as the missiles hit the gleaner encampment and is comforted by Kagame, who she agrees to help. In the past, Curtis escapes confinement after faking a suicide attempt, and Kiera tells the Freelancer leader she has now awakened.
| 31 | 8 | "So Do Our Minutes Hasten" | Pat Williams | Jeff King | May 11, 2014 |
Kiera and Dillon investigate an attack on Fermitas Corp, and learn that 12 people were killed with nerve gas. Meanwhile, Green Alec unveils a prototype healthcare device which he calls the "Halo" to the board. When Carlos is approached by Julian, he learns that Julian had been investigating Sonmanto with the help of Adele Mason, a former employee of Sonmanto. However, Sonmanto falsified the documents given to Julian to discredit him, with Adele's help. The next day, Kiera and Carlos learn that Sonmanto had failed in a takeover bid of Fermitas and believe they had hired Greypoint Security to carry out the attack. But when they voice their concerns to Dillon, he refuses to listen. That night, Betty is lured to a bar and is shot dead.
| 32 | 9 | "Minute of Silence" | Pat Williams | Simon Barry | May 25, 2014 |
Kiera investigates an amnesiac John Doe when he awakens after 2 months knowing nothing but her name. Meanwhile, Kiera and Carlos investigate a series of high profile technological thefts at Piron Corp. Kiera later grows closer to the John Doe and tells him about her life when she learns that he may be from the future. When the investigation leads Kiera and Carlos to Greypoint Security, they uncover a surveillance operation and learn that they had been monitoring the station and several corporations. During the investigation, they discover the thief and Betty's murderer. The next day, Green Alec extracts the CMR from Green Kiera's body.
| 33 | 10 | "Revolutions Per Minute" | David Frazee | Denis McGrath | June 1, 2014 |
Red Kiera's frail relationship with the Freelancers is pushed to the limit as she forges a deeper bond with the mysterious John Doe. Green Alec uses dead Kiera's CMR chip to save the Halo project—and begins to embrace his future legacy.
| 34 | 11 | "3 Minutes to Midnight" | David Frazee | Jonathan Lloyd Walker | June 8, 2014 |
Red Kiera's John Doe is revealed to be from the year 2039 and is called Brad Tonkin. While Brad disappears Red Kiera and Carlos discover that Dillon is covering up a series of violent attacks by testers of Green Alec's Halo device. While Carlos asks Julian for help, Red Kiera manages to track down Brad to his childhood home, but they are kidnapped by Liber8. Brad reveals to the terrorist group and Kiera that he is from 2039 and was sent back to prevent the future that is produced in 2014. While at first Liber8 like the idea that they had won, Kiera and Brad reveal that Garza is working for Alec from 2077. The fact that Curtis Chen is still alive begins to make Liber8 realize that maybe they haven't quite won anything. Kellog is revealed to have sent Brad back in time and that Curtis is working with him in present day. Liber8 then leave after realizing that they are simply pawns being used by those in power in the future. Elsewhere, Jason's health deteriorates causing him to hallucinate and almost kill someone who he mistakes for a freelancer after retrieving Red Alec's time travel device. He later discovers that Julian is searching for problems with Halo and then almost kills him but is stopped by Green Alec and security, after which Green Alec explains that he is trying to fix the problem that is causing Halo to affect behaviour. Red Alec's time travel device is confiscated by VPD after Jason's first incident and is kept in the department's evidence lockup.
| 35 | 12 | "The Dying Minutes" | Simon Barry | Shelley Eriksen | June 15, 2014 |
Red Kiera and Brad mount an assault on the Freelancer prison to free the Alec she mistakenly imprisoned as well as something hidden deep in its clutches, but its price may be steep. Carlos is aided by an unlikely ally as he vows to wrest control of the VPD from Piron and Dillon.
| 36 | 13 | "Last Minute" | William Waring | Simon Barry | June 22, 2014 |
Months later, Red Alec and Emily narrowly survive an assassination attempt. They return to join forces with Kiera and Brad to stop Green Alec's plans to accelerate the rise of Piron and the launch of Halo. Declaring that they must all embrace this new timeline, Kiera recruits the surviving members of Liber8, and Brad reveals that the device he reclaimed from the Freelancers will send a distress signal to his future meaning if he activates it and nothing happens, then his future has ceased to exist. Garza fakes an assassination attempt at the Halo launch, and in the confusion Kiera kidnaps Green Alec, and Red Alec returns to Piron to destroy the antimatter lab, and steals back the time travel device. However, Green Alec is rescued by his security forces, and returns to Piron only to die in a fight with Red Alec. In the wake of these events, Liber8 claims control over the Freelancer's base, Kellog reveals that he managed to get Green Alec to sign documents that allow him to take complete control of Piron and has Red Alec ejected from the company, and Brad's beacon activates with heavily armed soldiers emerging from a rift in the future implying that the disastrous future he was sent to prevent is still on track to occur.

== Production ==
On June 5, 2013, Continuum was renewed for a third season. Filming began on November 20, 2013. Season 3 premiered on March 16, 2014 on Showcase in Canada and on April 4, 2014 on the Syfy channel in the United States. The season began airing on January 28, 2015 on Syfy in the United Kingdom and Ireland.

== Broadcast ==
=== Ratings ===
Viewership and ratings per episode of Continuum season 3
| No. | Title | Air date | Rating/share (18–49) | Viewers (millions) |
|---|---|---|---|---|
| 1 | "Minute by Minute" | April 4, 2014 | 0.2 | 0.81 |
| 2 | "Minute Man" | April 11, 2014 | 0.3 | 0.86 |
| 3 | "Minute to Win It" | April 18, 2014 | 0.2 | 0.82 |
| 4 | "A Minute Changes Everything" | April 25, 2014 | 0.3 | 0.75 |
| 5 | "30 Minutes to Air" | May 2, 2014 | 0.2 | 0.76 |
| 6 | "Wasted Minute" | May 9, 2014 | 0.2 | 0.62 |
| 7 | "Waning Minutes" | May 16, 2014 | 0.3 | 0.98 |
| 8 | "So Do Our Minutes Hasten" | May 23, 2014 | 0.3 | 0.93 |
| 9 | "Minute of Silence" | May 30, 2014 | 0.2 | 0.66 |
| 10 | "Revolutions Per Minute" | June 6, 2014 | 0.3 | 0.80 |
| 11 | "3 Minutes to Midnight" | June 13, 2014 | 0.3 | 0.91 |
| 12 | "The Dying Minutes" | June 20, 2014 | 0.3 | 0.93 |
| 13 | "Last Minute" | June 27, 2014 | 0.3 | 1.07 |

== Reviews ==
The third season of Continuum received a 100% approval rating on Rotten Tomatoes based on 5 reviews.
