= Review bomb =

Advocacy through Internet user reviews

A review bomb is an Internet phenomenon in which a piece of media like a video game, a film or a TV series receives a large number of user-contributed reviews in response to actions of the media's creator or distributor that are not directly related to the media itself. In most cases a review bomb arises from highly negative reviews to draw attention to perceived cultural or political issues, especially if the vendor seems unresponsive or inaccessible to direct feedback. Review bombing also typically takes place over a short period of time and is meant to disrupt established ratings that a product already has at review sites, sometimes backed by campaigns organized through online message boards. It may be used as a mass-movement-driven coercion tactic, as a form of protest, or may simply be a form of trolling. Review bombing is a similar practice to vote brigading.

Review data of Team Fortress 2, which was review bombed in June 2024. Negative reviews are in red.

The practice is most commonly aimed at online media review aggregators, such as Steam, Metacritic, IMDb, Rotten Tomatoes, or app stores. It may be motivated by unpopular changes to an established franchise, political or cultural controversies related to the product or service, or to the actions of its developers, vendors, or owners. Some owners of aggregate systems have devised means to detect or prevent review bombing, such as only allowing reviews from official sources such as web sites and/or magazines and, in the case of Steam, only allowing people who legitimately own the game to leave a review on it.

== Origin ==
One of the first appearances of the term "review bomb" was in a 2008 Ars Technica article by Ben Kuchera describing the effect in regards to Spore, in which users left negative reviews on Amazon citing the game's perceived lackluster gameplay and digital rights management system. Kuchera wrote "Review-bombing Amazon is a particularly nasty way of getting the point across as well; casual gamers who aren't aware of this campaign may not bother to read the content of the reviews and only assume the game isn't very good."

== History ==
=== Video games ===
The increasing prevalence of review bombing was precipitated by the increase in influence of online user reviews in the main storefronts where games are sold, combined with little to no oversight of the content of these reviews. This is particularly true in the case of Steam, the predominant seller of PC games, where user reviews are often the only way for indie games to gain attraction on the service. According to Steam Spy, review bombing generally has little effect on a game's sales, and may in fact even increase them due to the resulting wave of publicity. However, it may be a symptom of decreased customer goodwill, which can have a more long-lasting effect on the publisher, developers or game series being criticized. Depending on how such situations are resolved, the effects of a review bomb may be reversed by the removal of negative reviews as in the case of Titan Souls, Death Stranding, and Helldivers 2.

=== Film and television ===
Theatrical films and television series have also been subject to review bombing, typically due to perceived social issues related to the cast and crew and not due to any aspect of the film or series itself. This extends not only to user review scores on sites like Rotten Tomatoes but to the film's promotional trailers on YouTube.

Amazon Prime Video series The Boys' second season was review bombed as a way to protest against its weekly release schedule, and fourth season due to its politics.

=== YouTube ===
YouTube's voting system has also been used for review bombing, where dissatisfaction over a creator or a video's content may attract campaigns to "dislike" a video on mass scale, with a goal to be among the most-disliked videos on the service. In December 2018, YouTube Rewind 2018 overtook Justin Bieber's "Baby" music video as the most disliked video; it was universally panned and faced criticism for its exclusion of various top personalities on the service, as well as other factors relating to controversies affecting video authors and criticism of YouTube itself. In November 2021, YouTube announced that it would remove the public dislike counts from all videos across the platform. Although the dislike button is still in place, this change effectively rendered the "dislike" bombing pointless. Certain browser extensions have since been created to return dislike visibility to users, though their accuracy is limited and they are unavailable on the YouTube app. YouTube has updated its Shorts dislike feature to instead hide the video from the user’s algorithm rather than contributing to a dislike total.

=== Businesses ===
Websites offering user reviews of businesses and other establishments, such as Tripadvisor and Yelp, can also be subject to review bombing in relation to controversies surrounding their proprietors. A notable example included an Elizabeth, New Jersey restaurant owned by the family of the 2016 New York and New Jersey bombings suspect (with many reviews jokingly referring to its chicken as being "the bomb"). Yelp intervened by removing reviews not based on first-hand experience with the restaurant.

During the COVID-19 pandemic, some restaurants have faced review bombs from the anti-vaccination community for enforcing vaccine passport rules.

=== Authors ===
One-star reviews for Gabrielle Zevin's Tomorrow, and Tomorrow, and Tomorrow, stated “Zionist author” and "It's not something trendy to be a Zionist; you should know better as someone supposed to be educated to have the right to publish a book.” Some of the reviews appeared before the book had been released. Other examples include Lisa Barr's Woman on Fire, Talia Carner's The Boy With the Star Tattoo, and a romance novel by Jean Meltzer. Barr commented, “I know that I'm on a list with other Jewish authors on TikTok”.

== Effects ==
In some cases, storefronts and aggregates have intervened to stop review bombs and delete the negative reviews. In February 2019, Rotten Tomatoes announced that it would no longer accept user reviews for a film until after its official release.

In 2017, Valve added review histograms to Steam user review scores to show how these change over time; according to Valve's Alden Kroll, this can help a potential purchaser of a game recognize a short-term review bomb that is not indicative of the game itself, compared to a game that has a long tail of bad reviews. Kroll said they did not want to silence the ability of users to leave reviews but recognized they needed to highlight phenomena like review bombs to aid customers. In March 2019, Valve stated that it would employ a new system to detect spikes of negative "off-topic" reviews on games: if it is determined that they were the result of a review bomb campaign, the time period will be flagged, and all reviews made during that period (whether negative or positive) will be excluded from the user rating displayed for a game. This system was first publicly triggered upon the Borderlands 3 review bombing in April 2019. Similarly, Valve stepped in to stop negative reviews of Rocket League, following the May 2019 announcement that its developer Psyonix had been acquired by Epic Games (leading to uncertainty over whether it would eventually become exclusive to the Epic Games Store). Valve said that they had to intervene 44 times in 2019 to stop review bombing on Steam.

In 2018, Rotten Tomatoes attempted to broaden and diversify its list of approved critics, who were largely white and male, in an attempt to improve its rating experience. By March 2019, the site no longer accepted audience reviews of a film until after its premiere, as part of an effort to counter pre-release review bombing. Further, it would only accept reviews from persons that have been confirmed to have seen the movie, as verified through theater chains like Regal Cinemas, Cinemark, and AMC Theatres, or through online ticket sales though Fandango.

In February 2020, Kunai by TurtleBlaze was review bombed on Metacritic, decreasing its user rating from 8.1 to 1.7 within a day. The studio, having no idea what they had done to trigger this, found that the review bomb was initiated by a single user, using numerous freshly created email addresses to register accounts at Metacritic as to bring down the user rating, all to demonstrate that a single person could have this effect. As Metacritic had no policy to handle or identify review bombing, this scoring impacted the game. Following the review bombing of The Last of Us Part II in July 2020, Metacritic added a 36-hour delay for user reviews to be added for a newly released game, with users given the message "Please spend some time playing the game" during this period. This was intended to prevent users from adding reviews without having completed a game and minimize the number of reviews that may be added as a result of a review bomb.

== Reverse review bomb ==
Infrequently, a review bomb may be used to praise the game, developers or publishers for other actions that players see as beneficial. One such case was for Assassin's Creed Unity, in the week following the Notre-Dame de Paris fire in April 2019. Ubisoft had made Unity free via its storefront UPlay, as the game included a recreation of the Notre Dame Cathedral. Steam users left numerous positive reviews for the game in the days that followed, with many thanking the developers for the free game and others expressing appreciation for the cathedral's recreation. Unity, which was released in 2014, had received mixed reviews prior to this event due to bugs and technical problems with the game's launch. While such an event had triggered Valve's safeguards against review bombs, they opted to not enforce it since the effect was meant to be positive.

A reverse review bomb may also be initiated by users to try to counter generally negative reviews from critics. Balan Wonderworld was panned upon its launch with a sub-50% Metacritic aggregate score as well as negative user reviews early after its release, but after a few days, a suspect reverse review bomb began with users submitting perfect reviews with similar commentary to reverse the user trend's scores towards a more positive value.

Like negative forms of review bombs, positive review bombs have also occurred as form of protest, such as in the case of anime series Interspecies Reviewers, where it was subject of a positive review bomb campaign targeting the series' MyAnimeList page. The campaign was initiated by anime YouTuber Nux Taku in response to Funimation removing the series from its online streaming platform. In wake of the closure of Tango Gameworks by Microsoft Gaming in May 2024, players used positive review bombing of its games like The Evil Within and Hi-Fi Rush on Steam to protest the studio's closure.

A negative review bomb can also backfire and incite a positive review bomb of the same target. For example, AI: The Somnium Files was review bombed on Metacritic in February 2020 by a single person through the use of numerous sock puppet accounts. The individual initially claimed that this was meant to highlight the flaws of Metacritic's user review system, but later admitted it was actually because they were upset with how a character in the game was written. Before the cause of the review bomb was known, the game's director Kotaro Uchikoshi used social media to ask for help from fans, who responded by posting positive reviews of the game in an effort to cancel out the negative review bomb. When Metacritic became aware of the review bombing, the negative reviews were removed from the game's page but the positive reviews that were posted in response remained, inflating the game's user score and causing it to temporarily be the website's top-rated Nintendo Switch game of all time while drawing further attention to the game as a result of the failed review bomb attempt.

Fallout 76 had been originally released to negative reviews by both critics and players on its initial release, but the game was improved over the following years. When the game released to Steam in April 2020, players still upset over several faults with the game's launch attempted to review bomb the game on Steam at this point. The game's community worked to counter this review bomb by posting positive experiences and reviews of the game at Steam and at other community sites to prove the game had been much improved upon the initial release.
