= Ikumi Nakamura =

Japanese video game artist and director

- 中村 育美
- Born: October 8, 1985 (age 40); Japan
- Occupations: Video game artist, director
- Years active: 2004–present
- Employers: Capcom (2004–06); PlatinumGames (2006–10); Tango Gameworks (2010–19); Unseen (2021–present)
- Children: 1

Ikumi Nakamura (Japanese: 中村 育美, Hepburn: Nakamura Ikumi) is a Japanese video game artist and director. She is best known for her work at Tango Gameworks as an artist on The Evil Within (2014) and The Evil Within 2 (2017), and as creative director for Ghostwire: Tokyo, before leaving the company mid-development. She also did artwork for Ōkami (2006) at Clover Studio, and Bayonetta (2009) at PlatinumGames. She now heads her own independent game studio, Unseen.

== Early life ==
Ikumi Nakamura enjoyed horror media with her father growing up. They watched horror films together, and enjoyed playing the Resident Evil and Devil May Cry series, both produced by Capcom. She developed an appreciation for the studio and dreamed to work there when she was older. While studying at university, her father died in a motorcycle accident. His death reinforced her desire to work at Capcom. She attended an art school in Tokyo, and later studied game design at the Amusement Media Academy.

== Career ==
=== Capcom ===
After applying twice, Nakamura was hired by Capcom in 2004. She joined the internal development team Clover Studio and created background art for Ōkami (2006).

=== PlatinumGames ===
Nakamura followed her Capcom colleagues when they left to form PlatinumGames. Early on at the studio, she pitched an idea for an original Nintendo DS game. After Nintendo did not take interest to the project, it was canceled. She served as a concept artist for Bayonetta (2009), and briefly worked on Scalebound as art director before leaving the company.

=== Tango Gameworks ===
In 2010, Nakamura left PlatinumGames to join Shinji Mikami's new studio Tango Gameworks. She served as artist for The Evil Within (2014) and The Evil Within 2 (2017), and as creative director for Ghostwire: Tokyo. Her presentation introducing the game at E3 2019 was widely heralded as a highlight of the press conference for Bethesda Softworks, Tango Gameworks' parent company. However, Nakamura left the project and the company mid-development in 2019 due to her declining health. The stress of developer-publisher politics and the publisher's ultimate control over Ghostwire: Tokyo left her unable to sleep and struggling with daily nightmares.

=== Unseen ===
After leaving Tango Gameworks, Nakamura did consulting and freelance jobs. In March 2021, she announced that she had started a new small independent game studio. The studio, Unseen, was formally revealed the following year. Nakamura expressed her intent for Unseen to create new intellectual properties (IPs) that can function across entertainment media. She also expressed her desire to continue working on games based in mystery, horror, sci-fi, and the supernatural. The studio's first game, Kemuri, was revealed at The Game Awards 2023. It is slated to release in 2027.

== Personal life ==
Nakamura lives in Tokyo. She had a child in 2020.

== Works ==
Year	Game	Role
2006	Ōkami	Background production
2009	Bayonetta	Concept art
2011	Marvel vs. Capcom 3: Fate of Two Worlds	Cinematics
2012	Street Fighter X Tekken	Painter
2014	Ultra Street Fighter IV	Painter
2014	The Evil Within	Lead concept artist
2016	Street Fighter V	Character concept art
2017	The Evil Within 2	Additional art
2022	Ghostwire: Tokyo	Initial creative director
2022	Gungrave G.O.R.E	Art advisor
2027	Kemuri	Director
