= Hi-Fi Rush =

2023 video game

- Developer: Tango Gameworks
- Publishers: Bethesda Softworks (Note: Originally published the game until the rights were transferred to Krafton); Krafton (Note: Current publisher since November 14, 2025)
- Director: John Johanas
- Producers: Masato Kimura; Shinsaku Ohara
- Designer: Masaaki Yamada
- Programmer: Yuji Nakamura
- Writers: John Johanas; Morten Brunbjerg
- Composers: Shuichi Kobori; Reo Uratani; Masatoshi Yanagi
- Engine: Unreal Engine 4
- Platforms: Windows; Xbox Series X/S; PlayStation 5
- Release: Windows, Xbox Series X/S; January 25, 2023; PlayStation 5; March 19, 2024
- Genres: Action, rhythm
- Mode: Single-player

Hi-Fi Rush is a 2023 rhythm-based action game developed by Tango Gameworks, originally published by Bethesda Softworks, and currently published by Krafton. The game's story follows self-proclaimed "future rock star" Chai (voiced by Robbie Daymond in English and Hiro Shimono in Japanese), whose music player is accidentally embedded in his chest during experimental cybernetic surgery funded by the corrupt Vandelay Technologies, allowing him to rhythmically fight and re-perceive the world through environmental synesthesia. Labelled a "defect" and hunted by the corporation that transformed him, Chai bands together with new friends to defeat the company's executives and put a stop to their plans.

Hi-Fi Rush's gameplay sets itself apart from other examples in the character action genre. Chai's relationship with his music player causes himself, surrounding enemies and environmental objects to move in sync with the beat of the game's soundtrack. Combat entails successfully connecting 'beat hits' by chaining attacks together in time with the music, being rewarded with higher damage output and end-level ranking if players successfully manage to do so. In addition to the character action gameplay, the title features numerous rhythm-based minigames that leverage the game's audio cues for on-screen interactions and puzzles. Progression takes place across multiple linear stages that mix platforming segments and arena-like encounters with enemies and minibosses, while being bookended by a themed boss fight with the corporation's various executives. Chai can additionally be equipped with upgrades and additional moves that are unlocked procedurally through in-game collectibles or currency put towards them. The game's soundtrack encompasses licensed music from bands such as The Black Keys and Nine Inch Nails.

Hi-Fi Rush was conceptualized with a smaller team at Tango Gameworks just as they were finishing The Evil Within 2 in 2017, out of an internal desire to branch the developer out of the survival horror genre they were previously synonymous with. The game entered full production the following year. Its style and presentation was principally inspired by the films of director Edgar Wright. The game's development was kept completely secret by Tango and Bethesda due to concerns over player expectations with the tonal and gameplay differences from its previous releases. The game was simultaneously announced and released by Bethesda Softworks for Windows and Xbox Series X/S on January 25, 2023. A PlayStation 5 version of the game was released in March 2024.

Hi-Fi Rush received critical acclaim upon release, with critics praising its visual style, art direction, humor, characters, and combat, though some noted its repetition, level design, and limited soundtrack. Hi-Fi Rush was the last game to be developed by Tango Gameworks as a studio under Bethesda and parent company Microsoft Gaming before its initial closure in May 2024. The studio was revived under the ownership of Krafton in August 2024, which also acquired the rights to the Hi-Fi Rush license from Microsoft with plans to develop further games while also exploring other projects. Microsoft and Bethesda retained the publishing rights to the title until November 14, 2025 when they were fully transferred to Krafton.

== Gameplay ==
Chai engaging in combat

Hi-Fi Rush is a rhythm-action game where the protagonist Chai, his enemies, and parts of the environment move to the beat. Attacking on rhythm is not required, as actions automatically sync up with the music, but by timing the button presses right the players are rewarded with higher damage output and timing-based combo finishers deal additional damage. A parry move allows players to cancel enemy attacks by pressing the button at the exact moment of attacks. In addition to the beat-em-up action mechanics, there are also rhythm-based minigame elements where players repeat cues in a call-and-response fashion, or press buttons in rhythmic sequence based on on-screen cues.

The game takes place across multiple linear stages, representing various divisions of the antagonist corporation. Each division is based on a particular musical style, and Chai engages in boss battles at various points.

In addition to combat, the game also features some platform game elements, as well as a system of upgrades to unlock new moves, abilities, and perks, which can be purchased with gears, an in-game currency earned in combat or by exploring levels. Permanent upgrades to health and the special meter also appear in stages as collectibles.

Completing the game once unlocks bonus features, such as the ability to revisit past levels and previously inaccessible areas, a new difficulty setting, and Rhythm Tower, a survival mode similar to Bloody Palace from the Devil May Cry series.

== Plot ==
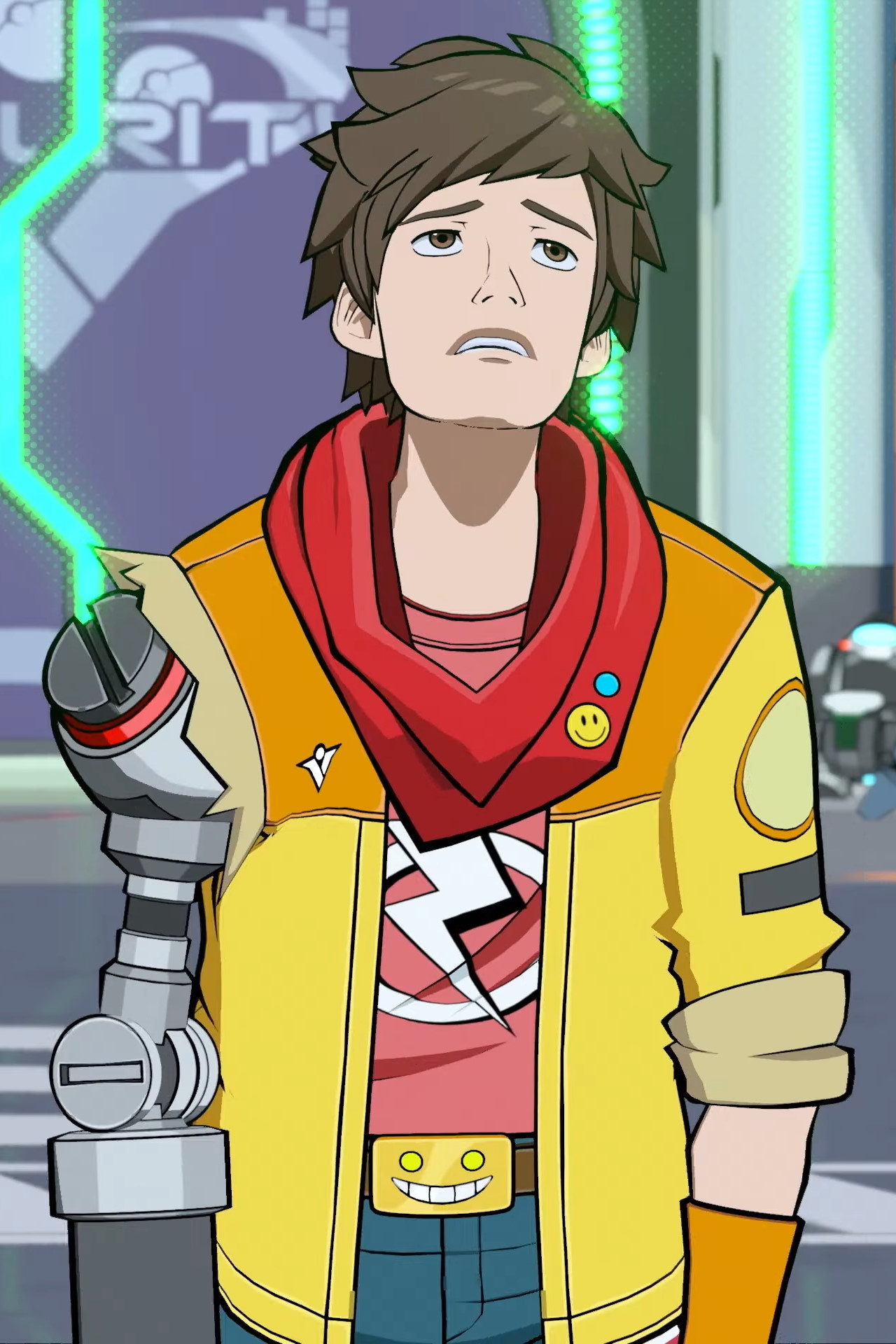
Chai

Chai, a 25-year old man with a disabled right arm and a dream to become a rockstar, arrives at the Vandelay Technologies campus to volunteer for Project Armstrong, a test program for cybernetic limb replacement. Unbeknownst to Chai, the CEO, Kale Vandelay (Roger Craig Smith / Takehito Koyasu) secretly designates Chai to be a garbage collector for the company's waste management. As Chai's limb replacement process is about to begin, Kale throws away Chai's music player, which accidentally falls into Chai's chest and embeds with it during the process, causing Chai to feel a musical connection with his surroundings. As a result of the accident caused by Kale's carelessness, Chai is labeled a defect and the facility's robotic security forces pursue him.

Chai discovers his new arm can deploy an electromagnetic grabber stick, originally meant for garbage collecting, which he uses to fashion a guitar-like weapon. As he searches for a way to escape, he encounters 808, a robotic cat named after the Roland TR-808 drum machine. He is aided by an unseen ally, Peppermint (Erica Lindbeck / Toa Yukinari), who communicates through the robotic cat, and is guided to her hideout. There, she offers to help Chai escape if he agrees to help her investigate a conspiracy—provided to her by a personal source—behind Project Armstrong, leading the two to form a reluctant alliance.

Soon, Chai helps Peppermint gain access to a Vandelay executive computer, and learn about SPECTRA, an AI-program that uses the cybernetic implants of Project Armstrong as a back-door for mind control. The two hatch a plan to access and shut down SPECTRA by securing passkeys from each of the company's executives, including Kale. As they pursue their targets, they recruit more allies, including the disgruntled and nervous former head of R&D (and Peppermint's inside source) Macaron (Gabe Kunda / Yasuhiro Mamiya) and his blunt psychology robot partner CNMN (pronounced "Cinnamon") (Sunil Malhotra / Hiroyuki Yoshino), and eventually Vandelay's security head, Korsica (Sarah Elmaleh / Yū Kobayashi), after Kale makes an attempt on her life for discovering SPECTRA's true nature. While exploring a museum of Vandelay Technologies, Peppermint reveals that her mother is Roxanne Vandelay (Rahnuma Panthaky / Naoko Kouda), the company's founder, which makes Kale her older brother. Some time ago, Roxanne encouraged Peppermint to leave home and find her own path, but she later returned after Kale's sudden ascent to CEO out of suspicion that something was wrong.

As the group pursues Kale, their final target, they encounter Roxanne, but learn she is being controlled by Kale via SPECTRA. Kale traps the group and explains that he plans to use Project Armstrong to control the users' purchasing habits and relieve the stress of consumerism. Chai frees himself and his allies from the trap as they confront and battle Kale. With Kale defeated, they use all five passkeys and Korsica's password to shut down SPECTRA, freeing Roxanne from its control. Afterwards, Roxanne is reinstated as CEO of Vandelay Technologies, Peppermint reconciles with her mother, and Chai is offered a job as the ambassador for Project Armstrong within the company, while Macaron and Korsica regain their old jobs. Later, Chai and his friends gather to look at the sunset while he practices playing guitar, so that he has a fallback career in case his new job doesn't work out.

Events after the main story reveal mysterious doors around the campus. After Chai investigates them, Peppermint discovers a secret hub room underneath Vandelay Tower, which houses a second SPECTRA unit. Once Chai passes the challenges in the room, he finds the unit, but discovers that SPECTRA was set to restart by itself, using the group's efforts as a launchpad for the endeavor. The AI, appearing as a replica of Kale, reveals that the activation was a backup plan in case Kale's plans were thwarted. However, SPECTRA is abruptly turned off after a cleaning robot accidentally pulls the power plug. Chai declares the problem solved and leaves a warning note not to touch the plug.

== Development ==
In a March 2022 interview with Famitsu, founder of Tango Gameworks and executive producer Shinji Mikami mentioned that he wants the company to venture outside of the survival horror genre and nurture younger game creators. He also offered the first hints about their next release, stating that the next game by The Evil Within 2 director John Johanas is "the complete opposite of horror."

Johanas later described Hi-Fi Rush as a "dream game" idea he had in his mind since "way, way back." He initially pitched the title to Mikami after completing work on The Evil Within 2 in 2017. After that a small team created an internal demo to help pitch the game to higher ups at Bethesda. The game was inspired by Shaun of the Dead (2004) and other films by Edgar Wright.

Hi-Fi Rush entered production in 2018 in parallel with Ghostwire: Tokyo. As part of the strategy by Bethesda, development was kept quiet, before the public announcement of the game's release. This was, in part, to avoid skepticism and unsure expectations, as the title was a big departure for both the developer and the publisher. After Microsoft's purchase of Bethesda, marketing suggested that Game Pass might offer a solution, by lowering the entry barrier and allowing the game to generate interest by word-of-mouth.

Hi-Fi Rush was announced at Xbox and Bethesda Developer_Direct on January 25, 2023. The game's appearance was intended as a surprise, although the title and logo were leaked online a day prior to the event. After showcasing the trailer and some gameplay footage, Tango Gameworks announced that the game will be releasing on the same day for Windows and Xbox Series X/S. The game received its final Xbox patch in May 2024 and the developers confirmed a physical edition was still in the works via Limited Run Games.

=== Music ===
The game's original soundtrack was created by former Konami composer Shuichi Kobori, former Capcom composer Reo Uratani, and Tango Gameworks' sound designer Masatoshi Yanagi.

Hi-Fi Rush uses ten licensed music tracks throughout the story: "Lonely Boy" by The Black Keys, "1,000,000" and "The Perfect Drug" by Nine Inch Nails, "Free Radicals" by The Flaming Lips, (Note: Covered by band Elsinore for the game) "Inazawa Chainsaw" by Number Girl, "Fast as You Can" by Fiona Apple, "Invaders Must Die" by The Prodigy, "Wolfgang's 5th Symphony" by Wolfgang Gartner, "Whirring" by The Joy Formidable, and "Honestly" by Zwan. Bethesda Softworks also created an official Spotify playlist with most of these tracks.

To avoid issues such as YouTube copyright strikes, the game includes an option to replace all licensed songs with similar original tracks performed by the band The Glass Pyramids.

== Reception ==
Reception

Aggregate scores
Aggregator	Score
Metacritic	(PC) 90/100 (XSXS) 87/100 (PS5) 88/100
OpenCritic	95% recommend

Review scores
Publication	Score
Digital Trends	4.5/5
Eurogamer	Recommended
Game Informer	8.75/10
GameSpot	9/10
GamesRadar+	4/5
Hardcore Gamer	5/5
IGN	9/10
NME	5/5
PC Gamer (US)	69/100
PCMag	4/5
The Guardian	4/5
Video Games Chronicle	4/5

Hi-Fi Rush received "generally favorable" reviews on Xbox and PS5 and "critical acclaim" on PC, according to review aggregator Metacritic.

Jordan Middler, from Video Games Chronicle, said that Hi-Fi Rush is "oozing with style and confidence", although there is "repetitive level design and some clunky platforming", scoring with a 4 out of a 5 star rating. Jesse Norris, from XboxEra, praised the combat, calling it sublime, but "can become difficult to read as the screen fills up with utter chaos", scoring it with 9.5 out of 10. Diego Argüello, from Polygon, called its animation gorgeous and Jet Set Radio-esque art style vivid and arresting.

Giovanni Colantonio from Digital Trends was very positive in his review of the title, calling it "Tango Gameworks' most confident, stylish and surprising project to date". On the other hand, Tyler Colp from PC Gamer gave a more mixed review, finding the game to be promising in its concept but ultimately average in the action genre, and thought its setlist of music was limited and dated.

=== Sales ===
The game reached 2 million players by March 2023, which has been counted as a mix of both digital sales and downloaded Game Pass subscriptions. By August 2023, the game reached 3 million players between purchased copies and Game Pass subscriptions.

=== Awards ===
Award nominations for Hi-Fi Rush
Year	Ceremony	Category	Result
2023	CEDEC Awards	Sound Award	Won
2023	Golden Joystick Awards	Ultimate Game of the Year	Nominated
2023	Golden Joystick Awards	Best Visual Design	Nominated
2023	Golden Joystick Awards	Best Audio	Nominated
2023	Golden Joystick Awards	Xbox Game of the Year	Nominated
2023	The Game Awards 2023	Best Art Direction	Nominated
2023	The Game Awards 2023	Best Score and Music	Nominated
2023	The Game Awards 2023	Best Audio Design	Won
2023	The Game Awards 2023	Best Action Game	Nominated
2023	The Game Awards 2023	Innovation in Accessibility	Nominated
2024	New York Game Awards	Big Apple Award for Game of the Year	Nominated
2024	New York Game Awards	Tin Pan Alley Award for Best Music in a Game	Won
2024	27th Annual D.I.C.E. Awards	Action Game of the Year	Nominated
2024	27th Annual D.I.C.E. Awards	Outstanding Achievement in Animation	Nominated
2024	27th Annual D.I.C.E. Awards	Outstanding Achievement in Audio Design	Nominated
2024	24th Game Developers Choice Awards	Best Audio	Won
2024	24th Game Developers Choice Awards	Best Design	Nominated
2024	24th Game Developers Choice Awards	Innovation Award	Nominated
2024	24th Game Developers Choice Awards	Best Visual Art	Nominated
2024	24th Game Developers Choice Awards	Audience Award	Nominated
2024	20th British Academy Games Awards	Animation	Won
2024	20th British Academy Games Awards	Audio Achievement	Nominated
2024	20th British Academy Games Awards	Family	Nominated
2024	20th British Academy Games Awards	New Intellectual Property	Nominated
2024	20th British Academy Games Awards	Artistic Achievement	Longlisted
2024	20th British Academy Games Awards	Music	Longlisted

== Future ==
On May 6, 2024, Microsoft Gaming, which controls Bethesda Softworks parent ZeniMax Media and its development teams, announced that they were making organizational changes to the publisher which involved closing four studios under the Bethesda umbrella, including Tango Gameworks. Xbox Game Content and Studios head Matt Booty explained that shuttering the aforementioned teams reflected an initiative to prioritize what Microsoft considered "high-impact titles", which included more investment in established franchises in Bethesda's portfolio. When interviewed by Bloomberg Technology shortly thereafter, Xbox head Sarah Bond addressed the closure of Tango more specifically, implying that an evaluation of success criteria on a game-by-game basis led to the decision. Despite Tango's closure, Booty would internally specify the necessity for Xbox to house the development of budget games that had potential for securing "prestige and awards" much like Hi-Fi Rush. Limited Run Games, which previously announced plans to distribute a physical release of the game for PlayStation 5 and Xbox Series X in February, assured that the title was still set to release as scheduled. Tango Gameworks was officially closed by Microsoft on June 14, 2024. At the time of their closure's confirmation, Tango was reported by Bloomberg News and other outlets to have pitched Microsoft and Bethesda on a Hi-Fi Rush sequel, but were turned down as executives felt that closing the developer would simultaneously ease communication with less teams spread across the world, and free up resources for other ventures.

On August 12, 2024, publisher Krafton announced they had reached an agreement to revive and acquire Tango Gameworks in its entirety from Microsoft and Bethesda, in an attempt to widen their global presence through investing in a Japanese studio. The acquisition coincided with Krafton obtaining full rights to the Hi-Fi Rush license, which enabled Tango Gameworks to continue development on the potential franchise while also producing more original projects under Krafton's support. The terms of the merger did not include the rights to either of Tango Gameworks' prior IPs, The Evil Within or Ghostwire: Tokyo, which remain under Microsoft's ownership alongside the publishing rights to the original Hi-Fi Rush. A Microsoft representative reiterated the company's intent to work with Krafton to ensure a smooth transition for Tango Gameworks and its developers, who were all re-hired by the firm, while also confirming that the agreement would not impact the existing availability of Tango's prior games under Bethesda on their current platforms, including on Microsoft's Xbox Game Pass service. On November 14, 2025, the publishing rights to Hi-Fi Rush were officially transferred from Bethesda to Krafton, with subsequent game updates being issued on December 4, 2025 that will revise the game's copyright and credits information to reflect the exchange of licensing.
