= Tekki =

Tekki may refer to:

- Naihanchi, also known as Tekki, a series of kata in Karate
- Steel Battalion, also known as Tekki, a video game created by Capcom
