= Shinji Mikami =

Japanese video game designer, director and producer

- 三上 真司
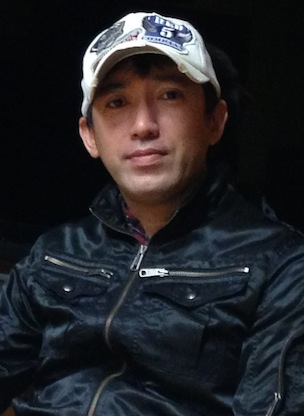
- Mikami in 2013
- Born: August 11, 1965 (age 61); Iwakuni, Yamaguchi, Japan
- Education: Doshisha University
- Occupations: Video game designer; director; producer
- Years active: 1990–present
- Employers: Capcom (1990–2006); Clover Studio (2004–2006); PlatinumGames (2006–2010); Tango Gameworks (2010–2023); Unbound (2023–present); Shift Up (2026–present)
- Known for: Resident Evil series; Dino Crisis; God Hand; Vanquish; The Evil Within; Ghostwire: Tokyo; Hi-Fi Rush

Shinji Mikami (三上 真司, Mikami Shinji; born August 11, 1965) is a Japanese video game designer, director, and producer. Starting his career at Capcom in 1990, he has worked on many of the company's most successful games. He directed the first installment of the Resident Evil series in 1996 and the first installment of the Dino Crisis series in 1999, both survival horror games. He returned to Resident Evil to direct the remake of the first game in 2002 and the survival horror third-person shooter Resident Evil 4 in 2005. In 2006, he directed his final Capcom game God Hand, a beat 'em up action game. Mikami founded PlatinumGames in 2006 and directed the third-person shooter Vanquish in 2010. That same year, he left the studio and founded a new studio Tango Gameworks and directed the survival horror game The Evil Within in 2014. He has also served the roles of producer and executive producer for many games. In 2022, he founded a new studio, Unbound Co., Ltd., and he left Tango Gamesworks in 2023.

In 2009, he was chosen by IGN as one of the top 100 game creators of all time.

== Early life and education ==
Mikami grew up in the Yamaguchi Prefecture of Honshū island. His father, who had to enter the workforce early and drop out of high school to support his family, beat him almost daily. Beyond family life, his was a normal childhood, without video games but full of outdoor play: "Back in those days, kids had to be somewhat creative in coming up with games to play, because there wasn't that much else to occupy your free time". His dream career was to be a Formula One driver. In his adolescence Mikami became “obsessed” with horror films, such as The Texas Chain Saw Massacre and The Evil Dead. Another hobby was the study of karate and kendo. After failing entrance exams two years straight, Mikami enrolled into and graduated from Doshisha University, where he majored in the study of merchandise.

== Career ==
=== Early years (1990–1993) ===
Although Mikami played arcade video games often, his entrance into the industry came by coincidence:

"A friend of mine had found a flyer advertising some kind of job fair-slash-buffet party Capcom was holding at the Hilton and he gave it to me because he knew I liked games. I went mainly because I wanted to eat at the Hilton for free, but once I started talking to Capcom people, really getting in depth about the work they do, I thought it sounded pretty neat. So I applied to both Capcom and Nintendo, and it turned out the second round of interviews for both companies were held on the same day, and I chose Capcom. It's likely for the better because I probably never had a chance with Nintendo."

His application was rejected at the screening process, then approved one week later. He joined Capcom in 1990 as a junior game designer, Mikami and fellow new hires were sent to a warehouse and ordered to "think hard about game design", then left unsupervised for the entire day. After a few months of just doing that, he was suddenly placed on a team and given a leadership position despite knowing nothing about game development.

His first title, a quiz game for the Game Boy titled Capcom Quiz: Hatena? no Daibōken, was made in three months. His three subsequent releases were all based on Disney-licensed properties: Who Framed Roger Rabbit for the Game Boy, and Aladdin and Goof Troop for the Super NES. Aladdin was his first hit, selling over 1.75 million units worldwide. Mikami also worked on Super Lap, an unreleased F1 racing game for the Game Boy that was scheduled to be released in 1992, but was canceled after eight months of development.

Mikami learned by observing his seniors; whenever he showed them his game design documents, they called his work "uninteresting" without giving any advice. He found this environment comfortable, since it engendered independence and freedom of thought. To Mikami, the art of game making was instilled in him by Tokuro Fujiwara.

=== Resident Evil (1993–1996) ===
After the release of Goof Troop, Mikami began development in 1993 of a horror-themed adventure game for the PlayStation set in a haunted mansion, called Resident Evil, originally conceived as a remake of Sweet Home (an earlier Famicom game by Capcom based on the Japanese horror film of the same name). Sweet Home director Fujiwara entrusted Mikami, who was initially reluctant because he hated "being scared", with the project, because he "understood what's frightening." Mikami said that Resident Evil was a response to his disappointment with Zombi 2, a gory 1979 film by Italian director Lucio Fulci; Mikami was determined to make a game with none of the failings of the movie. The resulting game became Biohazard, an action-adventure game which combined 3D polygonal characters and objects with pre-rendered backgrounds and featured zombies (among other monsters) heavily influenced by George A. Romero's Dead films. The game was retitled Resident Evil during its English localization under Capcom USA's suggestion and was released in Japan and North America on March 22, 1996, and became one of the PlayStation's first successful titles. It was the first game to be dubbed a survival horror, a term Capcom coined to promote the game. It was later ported to the Sega Saturn.

Resident Evil was considered the defining title for survival horror games and was responsible for popularizing the genre. Its control scheme becoming a staple of the genre, and future titles would imitate its challenge of rationing highly limited resources and items. The game's commercial success is credited with helping the PlayStation become the dominant game console, and also led to a series of Resident Evil films. Mikami had creative control over the screenplay and script of the first movie being dubbed a creative consultant. They had Mikami in this position to make sure fans of the games would be happy. He then dropped out of the later movies because he believed that the movies were heading in the wrong direction. Many games have tried to copy the successful formula seen in Resident Evil, and every subsequent survival horror game has arguably taken a stance in relation to it.

=== Capcom Production Studio 4 (1997–2002) ===
The success of Resident Evil was shortly followed by an internal restructuring at Capcom, whose development departments were turned into a plurality of numbered divisions, and a number of game directors promoted as their leaders. The staff behind Resident Evil became Capcom Production Studio 4, with Mikami appointed as its general manager, changing his focus towards being a producer. He considers the eight years spent in this position as the nadir of his career: he could not spend all his time on creative aspects and felt that he missed out on the best phase of his life. In his new role, he oversaw the development of Resident Evil's sequel, Resident Evil 2, which he intended to tap into the classic notion of horror as "the ordinary made strange," thus rather than setting the game in a creepy mansion no one would visit, he wanted to use familiar urban settings transformed by the chaos of a viral outbreak. The game sold over five million copies, proving the popularity of survival horror. Following its release in 1998, he oversaw the development of Resident Evil 3: Nemesis and also directed another survival horror title Dino Crisis, both of which released in 1999.

Shortly after the release of Resident Evil 3 in Japan, Studio 4's output turned towards further original properties, Mikami as executive producer, including the first Devil May Cry (initially conceived as a Resident Evil game). In 2000, Mikami became involved as producer of a new Resident Evil game, Resident Evil – Code: Veronica, a game designed from the ground up for the Dreamcast. Being a more powerful console than the PlayStation, the Dreamcast allowed the team behind the game to add for the first time, 3D environments instead of the usual pre-rendered backgrounds. Resident Evil Code: Veronica was released in 2000 and went on to sell 1,140,000 units. That same year, Mikami's Dino Crisis 2 was released, selling 1,190,000 copies worldwide.

In 2001, an expanded version of Code: Veronica was released for the Dreamcast exclusively in Japan, alongside a PlayStation 2 port that was released worldwide. This version of the game, titled Biohazard - Code: Veronica Complete Edition in Japan and Resident Evil - Code: Veronica X abroad, added ten minutes of new cutscenes not in the original release. The PS2 version, which initially came packaged with a trial version of Devil May Cry, went on to sell 1,400,000 units, according to Capcom's sales data for March 2006. In 2001, in what was to be one of his most controversial business decisions, Mikami formed an exclusivity agreement with Nintendo in which the main Resident Evil games would be sold only for the GameCube. The GameCube would receive, in addition to ports of previous PlayStation and Dreamcast installments, three new numbered entries in the series: a remake of the original Resident Evil, Resident Evil Zero, and Resident Evil 4. Resident Evil and Resident Evil Zero were both released in 2002.

The remake of Resident Evil was released in Japan on the sixth anniversary of the release of the original, on March 22, 2002. The remake was billed as the definitive version of the game, selling 490,000 copies in the US and 360,000 copies in Europe. In total, Resident Evil managed to sell 1,240,000 units during its first year of release. The remake's sales data was made public by Capcom during its Financial Review Report for 2002.

On November 12, 2002, Resident Evil Zero was released. Gaming site gamefront.de reported that 138,855 copies of the game were sold on its first day of release. Capcom expected Resident Evil Zero to sell 1.42 million copies, but sold only 1.12 million.

=== Capcom Five, Resident Evil 4, and Capcom split (2002–2004) ===
In spite of Resident Evil Zero's underwhelming sales, Mikami remained confident in his support for Nintendo and announced four exclusive titles for the GameCube under development by Production Studio 4 in addition to Resident Evil 4; P.N.03, Viewtiful Joe, Killer7, and Dead Phoenix. This lineup became known as the Capcom Five.

The first of these games to be released was the Mikami-directed P.N. 03. The game was both a commercial and critical failure, receiving indifferent reviews from the press and selling below expectations. As a result, Mikami stepped down as manager of Production Studio 4, while remaining as one of the head producers within the team. After his failure with P.N.03, Mikami decided to concentrate instead on the creative aspects of the Capcom 5. He eventually took over directorial duties for Resident Evil 4 from previous director, Hiroshi Shibata. Under his direction, Resident Evil 4 went through some substantial changes. Resident Evil 4 was released in 2005 and was one of the GameCube's top-selling titles, selling 1,250,000 units worldwide within a year. The game was critically praised, winning many game of the year awards.

Resident Evil 4 is widely regarded as one of the greatest and most influential games of all time, due to its influence in redefining at least two video game genres: the survival horror and the third-person shooter. Resident Evil 4 attempted to redefine the survival horror genre by emphasizing reflexes and precision aiming, thus broadening the gameplay of the series with elements from the wider action game genre. It helped redefine the third-person shooter genre by introducing a "reliance on offset camera angles that fail to obscure the action." The "over the shoulder" viewpoint introduced in Resident Evil 4 has now become standard in third-person shooters, including titles ranging from Gears of War to Batman: Arkham Asylum. It has also become a standard "precision aim" feature for action games in general, with examples ranging from Dead Space and Grand Theft Auto to the Ratchet & Clank Future series, Uncharted, The Last of Us, and God of War.

Mikami touted the game as a GameCube exclusive. In an interview with a Japanese magazine, Mikami even said that he would "commit harakiri" if it came out on another platform. This was loosely translated as Mikami claiming to "cut [his own] head" and later parodied in God Hand, which featured a racing dog named "Mikami's Head". In a 2017 interview, he apologized for Resident Evil 4 going multiplatform.

=== Clover Studio and God Hand (2004–2007) ===
After the success of Resident Evil 4, Mikami left Studio 4 and was transferred over to and originally established Clover Studio in July 2004, which employed an all-star lineup of Capcom development talent, including Atsushi Inaba (Steel Battalion and Viewtiful Joe producer), and Hideki Kamiya (Devil May Cry director). At Clover, Mikami directed God Hand, a beat 'em up comedy game that parodies American and Japanese pop culture. It was released in Japan on September 14, 2006, and on October 10, 2006, in North America. After Clover Studio closed in 2007, Mikami joined Seeds Inc, now known as PlatinumGames, the newly formed successor of his former studio. PlatinumGames is composed of several of Mikami's former Capcom colleagues, including Hideki Kamiya (until 2023), Atsushi Inaba, Yuta Kimura, Nao Ueda, Mari Shimazaki and Masami Ueda.

While working at Seeds (which would later merge with ODD to become PlatinumGames) the company was overwhelmingly understaffed, so Mikami sent his entire team to join the team led by Hideki Kamiya. As a result, he was left with no work to do besides attending meetings three times a week. For the first year or so, he was effectively stuck in a window sitter position. He considers that period the second worst nadir of his career, though not as bad as his time spent as a producer at Capcom. The experience once again reaffirmed his love for developing games in a hands-on role.

=== PlatinumGames and Vanquish (2007–2010) ===
Mikami formed a private development studio called Straight Story in 2006. The name of the studio is taken from David Lynch's 1999 film. Their works are under the PlatinumGames branding and he is a contract employee ("external board member") of PlatinumGames. He also collaborated with Grasshopper Manufacture's Goichi Suda on Shadows of the Damned using the Unreal Engine 3 and published by EA. Mikami revealed that Straight Story would close once development of Vanquish was finished, to be replaced with Mikami's new studio, Tango, which had already been established.

Much like Resident Evil and Resident Evil 4 before it, the third-person shooter game Vanquish, released in 2010, has proven to be an influential title for action games. It significantly improved upon the cover system, where in contrast to previous cover-based shooters, the cover in Vanquish is easily destructible, with often a single shot from a robotic enemy being enough to blast away the wall the player was hiding behind. The game also penalizes the player's ranking for the number of times they have taken cover, though its most important innovation is the power-slide mechanic that allows the player to slide into and out of cover at high speeds, or in bullet time when the player's health is low. The game was given GameSpot's Best Original Game Mechanic award for its rocket-sliding game mechanic, which acts as both a defensive escape and an offensive setup, opening up new gameplay possibilities for shooter games and increasing the pace significantly. Vanquish was itself inspired by Tatsunoko's 1970s anime series, Casshern.

=== Tango Gameworks and The Evil Within (2010–2023) ===
A teaser website opened on March 18, 2010, titled "Mikami Project" with a countdown attached. The website changed into a job employment page, for Mikami's new studio, "Tango". On October 28, 2010, ZeniMax Media, parent company of noted game publisher Bethesda Softworks, announced Mikami joined ZeniMax after it acquired Tango Gameworks. An April 2012 Famitsu interview with Mikami revealed the codename title of Zwei for the company's survival horror game The Evil Within, with Mikami directing. The game was released October 2014. The game is published by Bethesda on Xbox 360, PS3, PC, PS4 and Xbox One. Mikami stated that this will be the last game he directs. He stated that it will be a "true" survival horror game, "one in which the player confronts and overcomes fear", because he was disappointed by recent survival horror games becoming action horror games. In 2019, it was announced at E3 that his studio is working on a new project titled Ghostwire: Tokyo. On February 23, 2023, Bethesda Softworks announced that Mikami will leave Tango Gameworks in the coming months. Mikami commented he planned to leave Tango Gameworks 8 years prior, deciding to stay at the company due to commitments with ongoing projects. As for personal reasons to leave, he comments a desire to create an environment for young developers to gain experience, and to distance himself from the survivor horror genre, which he is frequently associated with.

=== Unbound Games and the present (2023–current) ===
In 2022, Shinji Mikami founded Unbound Co., Ltd. with staff who had worked in previous titles. The company started operations in 2023 as a fully independent company, but was fully acquired by Shift Up in March 2026. Their goal is to develop high-end AAA video games, with an original IP currently in development.

== Ludography ==
Year	Game	Role
1990	Capcom Quiz: Hatena? no Daibōken	Game designer
1991	Who Framed Roger Rabbit	Game designer
1993	Goof Troop	Game designer
1993	Disney's Aladdin	Game designer
1996	Resident Evil	Director
1998	Resident Evil 2	Producer
1999	Dino Crisis	Director, producer
1999	Resident Evil 3: Nemesis	Producer
2000	Resident Evil – Code: Veronica	Producer
2000	Dino Crisis 2	Executive producer
2001	Onimusha: Warlords	Advisor
2001	Resident Evil Survivor 2 – Code: Veronica	Supervisor
2001	Devil May Cry	Executive producer
2001	Phoenix Wright: Ace Attorney	Executive producer
2001	Resident Evil Gaiden	Advisor
2002	Resident Evil	Director
2002	Steel Battalion	General producer
2002	Phoenix Wright: Ace Attorney − Justice for All	Executive producer
2002	Resident Evil Zero	Executive advisor
2003	P.N.03	Director
2003	Dino Crisis 3	Executive producer
2003	Viewtiful Joe	Executive producer
2004	Phoenix Wright: Ace Attorney − Trials and Tribulations	Executive producer
2004	Steel Battalion: Line of Contact	General producer
2005	Resident Evil 4	Director, writer
2005	Killer7	Executive producer, writer
2006	God Hand	Director
2010	Vanquish	Director
2011	Shadows of the Damned	Creative producer
2014	The Evil Within	Director
2015	Fallout 4	Japanese voice of Takahashi
2017	The Evil Within 2	Executive producer
2022	Ghostwire: Tokyo	Executive producer
2023	Hi-Fi Rush	Executive producer
