= Steel Battalion: Heavy Armor =

2012 video game

- European box art
- Developer: FromSoftware
- Publisher: Capcom
- Directors: Isamu Okano; Yukio Ando
- Producers: Tatsuya Kitabayashi; Masanori Takeuchi; Kenji Kataoka
- Designer: Kazuhiro Hamatani
- Programmer: Takeshi Suzuki
- Artist: Daisuke Satake
- Composer: Yoshikazu Takayama
- Platform: Xbox 360
- Release: NA: June 19, 2012; JP: June 21, 2012; EU: June 22, 2012; AU: June 28, 2012
- Genres: Action, vehicle simulation
- Modes: Single-player, multiplayer

Steel Battalion: Heavy Armor (Note: Japanese: 重鉄騎, Hepburn: Jūtekki) is a 2012 action game developed by FromSoftware and published by Capcom for the Xbox 360. It is a sequel to both Steel Battalion and Steel Battalion: Line of Contact on the Xbox. Steel Battalion: Heavy Armor requires the Kinect sensor and uses a combination of an Xbox 360 controller and the Kinect for gameplay. The game was widely panned by critics, mainly due to the Kinect's inability to properly read player movements.

== Gameplay ==
The gameplay takes place inside a tank-like bipedal robot, known as a Vertical Tank (VT, veet, or Victor Tango), which the player and their crew control. The player is tasked with completing series of missions, which include destroying set targets, clearing areas of enemies or providing defense for military units. During these missions, the player must monitor enemy movements while coordinating with their crew members inside the robot, dealing with both interior and exterior threats. The player's crew, and other military units, can be killed, injured or suffer from other problems during battle, forcing the player to stay on alert and improvise during situations; killed crew members would also be replaced with other crew members, or their position would be left empty in consecutive battles, which would cause the player to have to fill in for their duties.

The game uses Kinect software, which coordinates the player's movements to their actions in the game. However, the limited control of the Kinect software combined with the need for precise movements in-game led to the game being nearly unplayable for some, due to the erratic and unresponsive controls.

== Setting ==
Steel Battalion: Heavy Armor takes place in the year 2083, 63 years after the "Datacide," a catastrophic event in which the world's supply of computer technology is destroyed due to a silicon-eating microbe that started destroying all microprocessors in 2020. As a result, military technology is reduced to primitive weapons, including the Vertical Tank, a large bipedal robot which is operated by a four-man crew: a pilot, left loader who doubles as an engine starter, a radio operator, and a right loader.

Because of its extensive industrial complex, China becomes the new world superpower, taking over the United Nations, and soon begins to dominate the world, both economically and militarily. On November 19, 2081, China, supported by the Chinese-led UN, launched a savage but swift blitzkrieg-style invasion against the United States, reducing the country from fifty to eight states: Tennessee, Mississippi, South Carolina, North Carolina, Georgia, Florida, Alabama and the new elevated state of Puerto Rico (with San Juan as the new capital of the US), before a ceasefire was declared. In the game, the Chinese-led UN is colloquially referred to as "Uncle" by the United States military.

== Plot ==
The story follows Sergeant Powers, a VT pilot, and the crew of his VT as they battle UN forces. The initial team consists of Natch, Rainer, and Parker. During the course of the game, the crew sometimes switches from different members of Powers' platoon who may or may not be killed during gameplay, which may affect the crew throughout the game.

On March 17, 2083, sixteen months after the China-UN invasion of America, the United States military runs an amphibious landing operation to retake the now occupied New York City using Vertical Tanks as the primary attack force. With the VTs' help, the troops are able to take New York City and establish a foothold on the mainland. After clearing New York City of the remaining enemy troops, Sergeant Powers and his crew are tasked with a series of missions, including the destruction of several ammunition depots, a radio array, a string of decoys to draw the enemy's attention, and the capture of a naval harbor in Norfolk, Virginia to disrupt the maritime supply lines of the Chinese-UN, which is mounting a heavy counter-attack. After a vital mission to retrieve a microfilm from an American spy in the UN, it is revealed that the UN is developing a new generation of VT called the Heavy Vertical Tank (HVT) in Berlin (after a war in Europe, Germany joined the UN, and is now a close partner with China), whose prototype proved highly successful in destroying Russian forces Siberia. American citizens are systematically captured and sent to Berlin as "test subjects."

The US military eventually decide to launch an offensive on Berlin. Since the closest remaining US forces situated near Europe are stranded in Libya, the military decides to mount an assault on Colorado Springs, where the main airbase of the UN in North America is situated in order to stop the bombardments on New York City and to secure the supply lines to Libya. After taking control of the UN airport, the battalion is shifted to Morocco, where the US forces are preparing an assault on the Gibraltar Strait to cross into Europe and reach Berlin. However, during a supply run in a UN-controlled refinery, the battalion is ambushed by the HVT, which kills the battalion leader, Lieutenant Straw, before the company is able to damage it, destroying the entire refinery in the process. Rejoining the US forces in Libya, Powers is promoted to Lieutenant and leader of the battalion and is tasked with a series of missions before leading the attack on the Gibraltar Tunnel. During one of the missions, Powers' battalion manages to seize a damaged HVT, revealing that the HVT is piloted by only one person in the cockpit with another in a hidden seat, who, the US intelligence finds out from the enemy's body, underwent a series of physiological modifications and is connected with the HVT by a series of cables. During the attack on the Gibraltar Tunnel, the US forces destroy all UN enemy forces in the area (including one of the HVTs). With this victory and the fact that the Russian Army is launching a massive offensive against the Chinese-UN forces in Europe along the border of Warsaw, Poland, the UN has no choice but to withdraw its troops from Spain and lift the pressure on America by retreating its East Coast-based forces to face the Russians.

The US military takes advantage of the situation to launch a coordinated invasion of France; the attack proves successful in taking Paris and destroying a military fort used to replenish the HVT's Human Processing Unit (HPU), which are UN-captured prisoners of war turned into biological processors (the second "pilot" of the HVT). En route to Paris, it is possible for Parker to be killed by sacrificing himself to protect the crew from a grenade thrown into the VT. The US military receives intelligence information suggesting that Russia and the UN have called a ceasefire. To avoid the UN's opportunity to crush the US forces in Western Europe, the US command decides to speed up the advance of its troops into Germany. The news, however, puts pressure on Lieutenant Powers after he receives news that his daughter (who disappeared during the China-UN invasion of America) is now a CI (Civilian Internee) inside a UN labor camp. Ultimately, the US military's concerns prove unnecessary since talks between Russia and the UN soon break apart, and the conflict resumes. To support the Russian advance in Europe, the battalion is tasked with the mission of destroying a railway gun used by the Chinese to keep the Russians in check at Dresden. Once destroyed, the Russian and American military commands agree to a joint mission to attack the HVT factory in Berlin. Powers' crew, aided by the Russians, manages to penetrate the factory and destroy several incomplete but still deadly HVTs, taking control of the factory. Following this, the Chinese Leader of the UN is killed in a Coup d'état, which leaves his protégé, Colonel Mao, as the commander of the UN military.

In the aftermath, the American-Russian task force attack Berlin, breaking through the UN lines after destroying a black heavily armored HVT (the last new model) and managing to seize Dr. Hamlin (the head of the HPU program), who decides to defect in exchange of asylum. To their dismay, the train used to carry Dr. Hamlin is later ambushed and destroyed by the UN, even though Powers' crew manages to protect the train from the UN forces. Unwilling to let Colonel Mao escape back to China with the data of Hamlin's research, the American-Russian command launches an attack on Mao's fort and research lab just outside of Berlin, opening the way to American troops in the fort (freeing hundreds of American CI's imprisoned there) and destroying the personal black-HVT of Mao. Colonel Mao activates the missiles stored in the fort, setting them to self-destruct and kill everyone within a few miles of the fort. Natch volunteers to go out towards the central computer to stop the countdown with the help of a VT.

Mao manages to leave his HVT and attempts to stop Natch. If Powers manages to kill Mao, Natch returns to the VT successfully and survives the mission. Suppose Powers cannot kill Mao in time; Mao kills Natch before killing himself after stopping the countdown. As Powers rushes to Natch, the point-of-view of Powers' daughter is seen inside Mao's black HVT as a HPU, seeing her father one last time before apparently dying. Later, a radio report reveals that the US has liberated the rest of the Continental US and that Russia is advancing in Siberia, with the UN and China willing to compromise with both countries, ensuring that the war is finally over.

If the player manages to complete the campaign with none of the platoon members dying, a bonus cinematic plays in which Powers leads the platoon with the crew optimistic about their upcoming battle with Russian forces, implying that Powers' daughter survived her internment as a CI.

== Development ==
The first Steel Battalion required players to control the game with a $200 special controller; Capcom was unwilling to make such a requirement for a 360-game and for a while it looked like the franchise was dead. This was until Microsoft began showing an early version of Kinect (then named Project Natal) to developers and publishers at which point producer Tatsuya Kitabayashi realized that the series could work with the new motion based controller. Describing the first game as "limited by the controller", Kitabayashi recognized that the Kinect could allow much more movement than the original game could provide. Because the game uses both the controller and the Kinect, Capcom had to seek special permission from Microsoft as their certification rules normally require that use the controller or the Kinect, but not both.

Capcom chose to work with FromSoftware from their work on Chromehounds, the Armored Core series as well as their work on Dark Souls. Capcom and FromSoftware worked to make sure that the game was not too easy, although in an interview with Digital Spy, producer Kenji Kataoka noted it was not as difficult as Dark Souls.

The game's original score was written by Yoshikazu Takayama. Motoi Sakuraba, who had previously worked with FromSoftware on Dark Souls, wrote the game's main theme.

== Reception ==
Reception

Aggregate score
Aggregator	Score
Metacritic	38/100

Review scores
Publication	Score
Destructoid	3/10
Edge	6/10
Electronic Gaming Monthly	4.5/10
Eurogamer	5/10
Famitsu	33/40
Game Informer	3/10
GameRevolution	1/5
GameSpot	3.5/10
GameTrailers	4.4/10
Giant Bomb	1/5
IGN	3/10
Joystiq	2/5
Official Xbox Magazine (US)	7.5/10
Polygon	1/10
Digital Spy	3/5
The Escapist	1.5/5

Steel Battalion: Heavy Armor was widely panned by critics for being nearly unplayable due to the inability of the Kinect to accurately read the player's movements, though the story, graphics, concept, and characters received some praise. It received "generally unfavorable reviews" according to the review aggregation website Metacritic. In Japan, however, Famitsu gave it a score of one nine and three eights for a total of 33 out of 40.

Digital Spy gave it a score of three stars out of five and called it "the first genuine hardcore Kinect game, something that makes it so much more appealing. Despite some flashy visuals and a hard as nails single-player mode, there's a sense that Heavy Armor would be a little dull if played exclusively with a controller". The Digital Fix gave it a score of five out of ten and said: "With the cost of Kinect included, Steel Battalion: Heavy Armor almost matches that price tag but lacks any of the niche appeal". The Escapist gave it one-and-a-half stars out of five: "While the concept is intriguing, the motion controls of Steel Battalion: Heavy Armor fail at making a game that's any fun". Mike Splechta of GameZone gave it a score of three out of ten and said it "could have been my dream game. It could have been the game that successfully brought on the marriage of an actual controller with full Kinect integration. The ambition behind the title was certainly huge, and I can't fault Capcom for that. However, with barely functional Kinect controls (tested out in various locations), Steel Battalion: Heavy Armor ends up being largely disappointing".
