= Tango Gameworks =

Japanese video game development company

Tango Gameworks Inc.
- Formerly: Tango K.K. (2010); Tango Gameworks (2010–2024)
- Type: Subsidiary
- Industry: Video games
- Founded: 1 March 2010; 16 years ago in Odaiba, Tokyo, Japan
- Founder: Shinji Mikami
- Headquarters: Shibuya, Tokyo, Japan
- Key people: Colin Mack; (studio head); John Johanas; (creative director)
- Products: The Evil Within series; Ghostwire: Tokyo; Hi-Fi Rush
- Number of employees: 100 (2024)
- Parent: ZeniMax Media (2010–2024); Krafton (2024–present)
- Website: tangogameworks.com

Tango Gameworks Inc. is a Japanese video game developer based in Tokyo. Former Capcom developer Shinji Mikami founded the company in March 2010. Following financial difficulties, ZeniMax Media acquired the studio in October of that year.

Tango developed survival horror games The Evil Within, The Evil Within 2, action-adventure game Ghostwire: Tokyo, and rhythm-based action game Hi-Fi Rush.

In March 2021, Microsoft acquired ZeniMax Media, making Tango Gameworks its first Japanese development studio. Microsoft closed the studio in June 2024. However, in August 2024, South Korean publisher Krafton agreed to acquire the studio from Microsoft for an undisclosed amount.

== History ==
Shinji Mikami joined video game developer Capcom in 1989, where he worked on several franchises and created the Resident Evil horror series. Over time, Mikami felt Capcom grew too large and wished to develop games outside the horror genre. For some time, he worked on a freelance basis, directing the action game Vanquish for PlatinumGames and producing the action-horror game Shadows of the Damned for Grasshopper Manufacture. He was repeatedly approached by Sega to develop a horror game for them, which he rejected.

On 1 March 2010, Mikami and a team of 12 developers founded Tango in Odaiba, Tokyo, relocating from his previous office in Osaka. Shigenori Nishikawa, the director of MadWorld for PlatinumGames, joined the company in May 2010. Tango immediately began working on multiple projects, including a small team that spent six months developing a joke game featuring a two-legged, gun-wielding cockroach.

Their primary project was Noah, a sci-fi open world survival-adventure game inspired by the 1984 film Dune. In this game, Earth had become mostly uninhabitable and humankind moved to other planets, where one colony loses contact with the others and a research team is tasked with finding them. Shortly after development on this game began, Tango ran into financial issues; according to Mikami, "something happened". American video game publisher Bethesda Softworks stepped in to assist and had its parent company, ZeniMax Media, acquire the studio. That deal was announced on 28 October 2010. For the acquisition, ZeniMax used a part of the US$150 million it had previously raised in private funding. Mikami agreed to the acquisition because he felt Bethesda and ZeniMax would provide the "most independent" development environment for Tango. The studio was merged into ZeniMax Asia K.K., ZeniMax's Asia-Pacific branch based in Tokyo's Aomi area, and reorganised as a division called Tango Gameworks. In November 2010, composer Masafumi Takada (formerly of Grasshopper Manufacture), as well as artist Naoki Katakai and programmer Shinichiro Ishikawa (both formerly of Capcom), joined Tango. By March 2012, the studio had 65 employees, with Mikami expecting to eventually grow to 100 staffers.

Following the acquisition by ZeniMax, Mikami envisioned Tango to continue developing multiple games at a time. Noah was cancelled and development on another AAA project, Zwei, commenced. Initially, this game saw a man and woman chained together hunting down a vampire, with either two players controlling each character individually, or one player both simultaneously. Zwei was formally announced in April 2012. Over time, the game evolved into a single-player survival horror game and was retitled The Evil Within, which was announced in April 2013. In August 2014, Tango moved from Aomi to the Shibaura district. The Evil Within was released by Bethesda in October 2014. It was the last game directed by Mikami, who stepped back from this role to have future Tango games provide opportunities for other people. A sequel to The Evil Within, The Evil Within 2, was announced at E3 2017 and released by Bethesda in October 2017. In June 2019, during Bethesda's press conference at E3 2019, Mikami and creative director Ikumi Nakamura announced Ghostwire: Tokyo, an action-adventure game with horror elements. Nakamura resigned from Tango in September 2019, leaving the studio after nine years.

Tango's parent company ZeniMax Media was acquired by Microsoft for US$7.5 billion in March 2021 and became part of Microsoft Gaming. Through the acquisition, Tango became the Xbox-maker's first development studio based in Japan. In March 2022, Tango released the mobile game Hero Dice and shut it down five months later. At the Xbox and Bethesda Developer_Direct on 25 January 2023, Tango Gameworks announced Hi-Fi Rush, a rhythm-action game which then released later that day. In February 2023, Bethesda Softworks announced that Mikami would leave Tango Gameworks in the coming months. Mikami would later establish a new studio named Kamuy.

=== Closure by Microsoft and acquisition by Krafton ===
In May 2024, Matt Booty, Microsoft Gaming President of Game Content and Studios, announced plans to close down Tango Gameworks. The closure was one of four studios that were managed under Microsoft, alongside Arkane Austin, Alpha Dog Games, and Roundhouse Studios. The decision was massively panned by both fans and journalists, with criticism centering around Microsoft's decision to close the studio despite the critical success of Hi-Fi Rush. The studio was closed on 14 June 2024.

On 12 August 2024, South Korean publisher Krafton announced that it had acquired Tango Gameworks for an unspecified amount. The deal had gone into effect on 1 August and that around 50 of the original 105 staff members would be brought back, with the rest of them reported to have already found employment elsewhere. It also confirmed that the acquisition would include the rights to Hi-Fi Rush, and that there were plans to "continue developing" the property and "explore future projects". The Evil Within and Ghostwire: Tokyo rights remained at Microsoft, with the company planning on continuing to work alongside Tango and Krafton in a strategic partnership, helping Tango's transition and supporting future Hi-Fi Rush projects. On 1 January 2025, Tango Gameworks announced that it had been incorporated as Tango Gameworks Inc. to formally join Krafton. On 2 June 2025, Tango Gameworks updated its branding and website, stated of its new brand design as "Focused on what it feels like to make a game, our vision is centered on a studio that acts like a creative workshop, making games and experiences that emphasize that “hand-made” feel we put into our work."

== Games developed ==
Overview of games developed by Tango Gameworks
Year	Title	Platform(s)	Publisher(s)
2014	The Evil Within	PlayStation 3, PlayStation 4, Windows, Xbox 360, Xbox One	Bethesda Softworks
2017	The Evil Within 2	PlayStation 4, Windows, Xbox One	Bethesda Softworks
2022	Ghostwire: Tokyo	PlayStation 5, Windows, Xbox Series X/S	Bethesda Softworks
2022	Hero Dice	Android, iOS	ZeniMax Asia
2023	Hi-Fi Rush	Windows, Xbox Series X/S, PlayStation 5	Bethesda Softworks (2023–2025), Krafton (2025–present)
