= Goof Troop (video game) =

1993 video game

- Developer: Capcom
- Publisher: Capcom
- Producer: Patrick Gilmore
- Designers: Satoshi Murata; Shinji Mikami
- Programmer: Masatsugu Shinohara
- Artists: Naoe Yoshida; Tomohiko Inagaki; Toru Nakayama
- Composer: Yuki Iwai
- Series: Goof Troop
- Platform: Super Nintendo Entertainment System
- Release: NA: July 1993; EU: November 25, 1993; JP: July 22, 1994
- Genre: Action-adventure
- Modes: Single-player, multiplayer

Goof Troop (Note: Japanese: グーフィーとマックス: 海賊島の大冒険, Hepburn: Gūfii to Makkusu: Kaizokujima no Daibōken; lit. 'Goofy and Max: Great Adventure on Pirate Island') is an action-adventure video game developed and published by Capcom for the Super Nintendo Entertainment System. It was originally released in North America in July 1993, in Europe on November 25, 1993, and in Japan on July 22, 1994, and based on the animated television series of the same name. The game can be played in both single-player and multiplayer mode, wherein one player controls Goofy and the other Max.

Goof Troop is one of the first games designed by Shinji Mikami, who would go on to be renowned for his work on the Resident Evil series.

== Gameplay ==
Goofy and Max working as a team to solve the third level

Playing as Goofy and/or Max, the player(s) work(s) through five areas on Spoonerville Island: on the beach, in a village under siege, a haunted castle, a cavern, and finally the pirate's ship where Pete and PJ are held captive. Goofy moves slower than Max but can deal more damage to enemies.

The goal of each level is to solve various puzzles in order to reach the end of the stage and defeat the boss. Although Goofy and Max cannot fight directly, they can use various methods to defeat enemies such as throwing objects such as barrels or bombs at them, kicking blocks into them, knocking them off the stage or luring them into the path of enemy attacks. Throughout the game, players can find various collectible items that can aid them. Collecting pieces of fruit can protect Max or Goofy from a single hit, with extra lives earned if the player can collect a certain amount of fruit without getting hit. Collecting red diamonds earns an extra life while blue diamonds earn a continue. In multiplayer, if one player loses all of their lives, they can respawn with three more lives if the player can move to another screen. However, if both players lose all their lives on the same screen, the game is over, although if they have any continues, they can continue from the same screen. Otherwise, they will have to resume from the beginning of the stage using a password.

In order to progress through the game, players must collect various items to use. Each player can only hold one item at a time (two in single player). The grappling hook is used to cross large gaps between hooks, though can also be used to knock back enemies and collect items from long distances. The bell is used to lure the attention of enemies in order to set off puzzles or set them up for an ambush by the other player. Other items include candles to light up dark areas, shovels to dig up soft dirt for items, boards to cover gaps in bridges and keys to unlock certain gates and doors. Certain doors will only be opened under certain conditions, such as sliding blocks into places or defeating all the enemies on screen.

At the end of each level is a boss fight, where the boss must be defeated using various throwable objects that appear in the room.

== Plot ==
Goofy and his son Max go out to the ocean for a fishing trip with their neighbors, Pete and PJ. While fishing, a large pirate ship appears and abducts Pete and PJ, and begins travelling towards the pirates' stronghold on Spoonerville Island. Goofy is unable to stop the ship before it makes landfall, so he and Max decide to explore the island and rescue their friends. Goofy and Max later learn that the pirates have mistaken Pete for their captain, the pirate king Keelhaul Pete, who had been swallowed by a whale long ago. As Goofy and Max venture further into the island, Pete and PJ keep up the misconception, as Pete enjoys being treated like royalty.

Eventually, Goofy and Max reach the pirates' ship, and see what appears to be Pete. Goofy attempts to save him, but accidentally knocks him out. Max then realizes that the person they assumed to be Pete is actually the real Keelhaul Pete, having returned after the whale spat him out. Concerned with the safety of their neighbors, Goofy and Max infiltrate the pirate ship, culminating in another encounter with Keelhaul Pete. After defeating him, they find Pete and PJ about to be fed to an alligator, and promptly rescue them. Suspending Keelhaul Pete over the alligator in their place, Goofy, Max, Pete, and PJ return to their fishing trip.

== Release ==
Goof Troop was released in North America for the Super Nintendo Entertainment System in July 1993. It was released for the Super Famicom in Japan on July 22, 1994.

The game was re-released for the first time as part of the Nintendo Switch and Nintendo Switch 2 versions of The Disney Afternoon Collection, released by Atari under license from Capcom and Disney.

== Reception ==
Reception

Review scores
| Publication | Score |
|---|---|
| Electronic Gaming Monthly | 7/10, 8/10, 8/10, 8/10 |
| Famitsu | 6/10, 7/10, 7/10, 5/10 |
| GamesMaster | 78/100 |
| Official Nintendo Magazine | 81/100 |
| Super Play | 69% |
| Total! | (UK) 63% (DE) 2 |
| VideoGames & Computer Entertainment | 7/10 |
| Electronic Games | 81% |
| Nintendo Game Zone | 50/100 |
| SNES Force | 88/100 |
| Super Action | 67% |
| Super Gamer | 76% |
| Super Pro | 76/100 |

Goof Troop garnered generally favorable reviews from critics. Nintendo Power criticized its challenge for being "fairly low", but remarked that "the game is still great fun". In 2013, Andy Green of Nintendo Life largely lauded the game, stating: "Goof Troop is an absolute gem of a game when teaming up with a friend in multiplayer. It might be short, the gameplay may be simple and the puzzles are easy but there's no denying it's an incredibly enjoyable experience when both members of the Troop are on screen". In the same review, Green criticized the single player mode, stating: "the simplistic nature of the game and its low difficulty level makes it tedious and as time goes on you'll get fed up completing puzzles that were evidently designed for more than one person".

== See also ==
- List of Disney video games
