= Shadows of the Damned =

2011 action-adventure video game

- Developer: Grasshopper Manufacture
- Publishers: Electronic Arts; NetEase Entertainment Interactive (Remaster)
- Directors: Goichi Suda (General Director); Massimo Guarini
- Producers: Shinji Mikami; Steven Matulac
- Designer: Massimo Guarini
- Artist: Phillip Peel
- Writers: Goichi Suda; Massimo Guarini; Brian Gray
- Composer: Akira Yamaoka
- Engine: Unreal Engine 3
- Platforms: PlayStation 3 Xbox 360; Nintendo Switch; PlayStation 4 PlayStation 5 Windows; Xbox One; Xbox Series X/S
- Release: PlayStation 3, Xbox 360: NA: June 21, 2011; AU: June 23, 2011; EU: June 24, 2011; JP: September 22, 2011; Switch, PS4, PS5, Windows, Xbox One, Xbox Series X/S: WW: October 31, 2024
- Genres: Action-adventure, third-person shooter
- Mode: Single-player

Shadows of the Damned (Note: Japanese: シャドウ・オブ・ザ・ダムド, Hepburn: Shadō obu za Damudo) is a 2011 action-adventure video game developed by Grasshopper Manufacture and published by Electronic Arts for the PlayStation 3 and Xbox 360. It was directed by Massimo Guarini, produced by Shinji Mikami and written by Suda51. The game follows Garcia Hotspur, a Mexican demon hunter who goes to the City of the Damned to battle its evils in order to save his girlfriend Paula, who was captured by the Lord of Demons, Fleming.

The game is the result of a collaboration between Goichi Suda and Shinji Mikami, and the combined styles of the two designers, namely the "punk rock" (Note: By "punk" according to Suda is referring to the disruptive, angry, and antagonistic feeling, not the musical genre) edge of the former and the "psychological action thriller" of the latter. Upon release, the game received generally positive reviews from critics, but sold extremely poorly.

A remastered version of the game, Shadows of the Damned: Hella Remastered, was released in October 2024 for Nintendo Switch, PlayStation 4, PlayStation 5, Windows, Xbox One, and Xbox Series X/S.

== Gameplay ==
Shadows of the Damned is an action-adventure and third-person shooter video game. The player controls Garcia, moving him through the environments. Garcia's sidekick, Johnson, is ever-present, acting normally as a torch for light or quick melee attacks, but can become a weapon when needed. Johnson can take three forms: a pistol, a shotgun, and automatic rifle, all which are upgraded into more powerful forms either by finding blue gems left after boss fights that add extra abilities, or through slotting of red gems, found in the environment or purchasable from Christopher, to improve damage, reload speed, or ammo capacity. Garcia's health bar can also be extended using red gems. Health is restored by imbibing alcohol that can be found in the game's levels, or purchasable from Christopher or vending machines using white gems, the form of currency in the demon world.

Johnson also can fire a special "light bullet", which can be used to both stun enemies and is a primary mechanic of the game's "darkness" puzzles. If Garcia enters an area covered by darkness, he will momentary be safe but soon the darkness will drain his health until he leaves or dissipates it. This most often can be done by firing a light bullet at a goat's head in the area, but often finding this goat requires completing other puzzles, such as opening a series of locked doors. Other ways of dispelling the darkness included killing demons that are spewing it, or using fireworks to temporarily remove it. In some puzzles, the solution can only be completed while Garcia is within the darkness. Demons that spawn from the darkness often will be shrouded by it even when the darkness is dispelled, preventing Garcia from damaging them until struck with a light bullet. There are numerous boss fights that combine several aspects of the gameplay, including darkness, to be defeated. Certain levels are based on mini-games, such as the use of a sidescroller in some chapters.

== Plot ==
Demon hunter Garcia Hotspur comes home to find his girlfriend, Paula, being abducted by the Lord of Demons, Fleming, who brags that he will take Paula with him to kill her again and again. Garcia is powerless to stop Fleming, but instead follows him back to the underworld along with his demon sidekick, Johnson, who also acts as his gun, torch and motorcycle. In the demon world, Johnson helps guide Garcia through the twisted nature of the demon realm, defeating numerous enemies that try to feed on Garcia's flesh, and keeping him away from the darkness that destroys the human flesh.

As they travel, they witness numerous deaths of Paula by Fleming and other demons, all to toy with Garcia's senses. Another human demon hunter, who simply goes by the name "Colonel", temporarily aids Garcia, but then leaves to get revenge on the death of his loved one, only to be brutally killed later. Garcia also encounters an ally in Christopher, a half-human, half-demon that sells Garcia valuable goods to boost his demon-fighting powers.

Later in the game, Garcia and Johnson learn of the Unbreakable Huntress, the first female demon slayer to ever challenge Fleming. The Unbreakable Huntress challenged Fleming, but was brutally dismembered by the demon king. Impressed with her refusal to surrender even when reduced to a quad amputee, Fleming made the Huntress into his queen, only to repeatedly kill her over and over again, healing any wounds that resulted from the torture. In rebellion, the Unbreakable Huntress continued to escape from the City of the Damned, only to be dragged back and killed by Fleming. Paula is hinted to have been the Unbreakable Huntress prior to the start of the game.

Eventually, Garcia reaches Fleming's "Castle of Hassle", and battles his way through to its top, where Fleming awaits him, Paula encased within his cloak. Fleming enters into battle with Garcia, but Garcia gains the upper hand, and destroys him. He rushes to Paula's side, but she hits him, angered that he watched her die over and over and made no attempt to stop it or comfort her. Furious, she transforms into a demon herself, and attacks Garcia, but Garcia eventually weakens her enough. Paula reverts to her human form, and as she lies wounded and the darkness surrounds them, Garcia comforts her and apologizes.

In the epilogue, Garcia and Paula have returned to his home and are planning for a trip, when Garcia receives a call from Fleming, warning him that more demons are coming for him. Garcia takes this in stride, commenting that as long as he is dating the Lord of Demon's mistress, demons will continue to follow them, and he vows to kill every last one.

== Development ==
Shadows of the Damned marked the second collaboration between Japanese game designers Goichi Suda and Shinji Mikami. They had previously partnered to work on the 2005 title Killer7 which Suda directed at Grasshopper Manufacture under the supervision of then Capcom game producer Mikami. Killer7 released to critical acclaim and expanded the public recognition of Suda's studio, which thereby began to explore opportunities for projects with mainstream appeal. Despite his team's prior experience of joint ventures with other companies, Suda sought to advance Grasshopper's financial success by the creation of internally produced games. Around 2006, he engaged the studio with the idea to develop a survival horror game titled Kurayami (暗闇, lit. "Darkness"), conceived as an exclusive title for the PlayStation 3.

After Grasshopper committed to the game's development, Suda invited Mikami, who by then had departed from Capcom and established himself as an independent designer, to participate as producer. Kurayami originated from Suda's fascination with the works of Franz Kafka, specifically The Castle, whose narrative setting he hoped to recreate within the video game medium. In Suda's intended storyline for the game, the protagonist explored during nighttime a fantastical town surmounted by a large castle, which served as the point of destination for the player's journey. Although many hostile creatures populated the mostly unlit areas of the game's world, the player character wielded a torch which allowed him to illuminate and traverse those environments. Sources of danger for the game's protagonist extended beyond the enemy beings, as Suda wanted to enable interaction between the player and the town's ordinary residents from which confrontations could arise. Horror mangaka Q Hayashida provided enemy designs for the game.

From this framework, Suda wanted to model Kurayami's aesthetics after the motif of "darkness", and hoped that the game would present the player with terrifying in-game scenarios by invoking "our natural fear of the dark and the creeping discomfort we feel when things are quiet and lifeless". To reinforce the visualization of those themes in the game, Suda planned to implement in Kurayami a specific variation of pixel shaders that would emphasize dark color tones of the game's graphics and mix textures with stylized effects. He credited this necessity as the impetus for his decision to develop the game for the PlayStation 3, as the platform's processing power aligned with Suda's expectations for the technology suited to deliver his envisioned visual technique.

Suda pushed Grasshopper Manufacture to reinvent its accrued design practices from Killer7 for the creation of Kurayami in order to provide players with an innovative interactive experience; at the same time, he sought to carry over his established directorial style into the game. Comparing the game to Killer7, Suda remarked that Kurayami employed an increased degree of player control over the protagonist and a greater focus on action-based sequences, features which he believed to be evidence of the gameplay's variability. The game's plotline was fashioned after a less linear template than that of Suda's past works, as he wanted to convey "a thought-provoking message, not one that I just pick out of thin air once development work begins or some utopian nonsense about earth peace". Whereas Suda mentioned that he had considered the idea for Kurayami extensively before the game's unveiling, at the time that the title was publicly revealed by Edge in May 2006, the development was in its earliest phase.

By E3 2006, a publisher for Kurayami had not yet been established. In 2009, Suda revealed that his team did not work on the game over the preceding years due to their dense overall workload, and that the project's only assets comprised the designer's conceptual artwork that he showcased to Edge. Although at the time, Suda claimed that Grasshopper never decided to cancel Kurayami, the studio eventually abandoned the concept and restarted the production. Kurayami ultimately served the first incarnation of Shadows of the Damned. In 2008, Suda presented the game's concept to EA Games, who agreed to license the Unreal Engine 3 and to publish the game to a worldwide audience. Suda wanted to announce the game at E3 2009, but was not allowed to do so, due to a media silence agreement between Grasshopper Manufacture and EA Games. That December, Akira Yamaoka (sound designer for the Silent Hill series) left Konami after finishing his work on Silent Hill: Shattered Memories and joined Grasshopper Manufacture because he enjoyed the latter's game No More Heroes. Yamaoka began work as the sound designer for the game. The game went about five different versions until Electronic Arts approved it. The newly titled Shadows of the Damned was finally unveiled at the Tokyo Game Show in 2010 as an action game.

Shadows of the Damned took three years to make, and the game design had gone through significant changes (five design drafts in total). Originally, Garcia was going to start out shirtless and without a gun. From there, he would gradually acquire weapons along the way and purchase clothes at stores within the game. However, Grasshopper was pressured by EA to have Garcia start with a gun because "westerners are about guns." In addition, Paula was originally designed as a little girl living in Garcia's gun that would hop around like a rabbit or flutter like a butterfly when her ability is needed; and this would lead to a prominent love story. Again, EA had these features removed because they did not understand the concept. EA informed Grasshopper that "there's this thing called an elevator pitch in America, and if you can't tell your story in the length of an elevator ride, Hollywood won't use it." This forced Suda to completely scrap all of his initial ideas, with Johnson replacing Paula's role and the game becoming akin to a fairy tale, like Lupin the Third: The Castle of Cagliostro or Princess Peach and Mario.

On July 17, 2012, Mikami expressed his disappointment and regret with Shadows of The Damned. He elaborated further in 2020 that Suda's original idea, which had more of an "indie spirit," did not mesh well with EA's US$10 million budget. He said EA lied to them when they liked the original concept because later on, the publisher pressured them to change the game.

[Shadows of The Damned] became a completely different game. That was a bit disappointing. I think Suda was unable to create the scenario he'd originally had in his head, and he rewrote the scenario several times. I think his heart was broken. He's such a unique creator, so it seems to me that he was not quite comfortable with making this game.

— Shinji Mikami

In 2019, Suda said the development of Shadows of the Damned was a huge challenge because as a habit of his, changing the game design meant he had to change the main character as well. He had to discard three character designs before settling with Garcia. He added that if he had to work with EA again on a new game, he would appreciate it if they would approve the first design draft the next time. In April 2024, Suda wanted to clarify that despite the shaky development, there was and is no animosity between him and EA.

== Reception ==
Reception

Aggregate score
Aggregator	Score
Metacritic	(PS3) 77/100 (X360) 76/100

Review scores
Publication	Score
1Up.com	C+
Destructoid	(X360) 8.5/10
Eurogamer	(X360) 7/10
Game Informer	9.25/10
GamePro	4/5
GameRevolution	B+
GameSpot	8.5/10
GameSpy	4/5
GameTrailers	(PS3) 6.7/10
GameZone	8.5/10
Giant Bomb	(X360) 4/5
IGN	7/10
Joystiq	(X360) 4/5
Official Xbox Magazine (US)	8/10
PlayStation: The Official Magazine	8/10
VideoGamer.com	7/10
The Daily Telegraph	(X360) 7/10
The Escapist	(X360) 3/5

Awards
Publication	Award
GameSpot	Best Music (Editor's Choice)
GameSpot	Best Sound Design (Editor's Choice)

Shadows of the Damned received "generally favorable reviews" according to the review aggregation website Metacritic. In Japan, Famitsu gave it a score of all four eights for a total of 32 out of 40.

Destructoid said of the Xbox 360 version: "This crackbrained horror romp takes camp to a new extreme and wants you, the player, to have nothing but fun the entire time." GameSpot praised the game's sound design, challenging and terrifying bosses, varied gameplay, and clever use of darkness, but criticized the lack of a new game+ function as well as the stiff animation. GameZone said, "To a much simpler degree, Shadows of the Damned is an amazing experience that anyone with a sense of humor and an affinity for rich games should get their hands on ASAP." 1Up.com gave the game a C+ and concluded that the "Creative story, presentation, and wonderful music provide the saving grace in doses, but almost all of your gameplay encounters can be summed up as average at best." VideoGamer.com gave the game an 7 out of 10 praising the game's story and humor and concluded that "Shadows of the Damned is easy to criticise, but it's got character - brimming with the stylishness of Suda 51 and the maturity of Mikami."

The A.V. Club gave the Xbox 360 version an A−, saying that "Suda 51's warped, pop-culture-obsessed vision and Mikami's sure-fire action make a heck of a match." The Guardian gave it four stars out of five and said, "It's true that, at times, it feels a bit disjointed, the dialogue is occasionally annoyingly clunky and given that it has no online element, you could argue that it's hopelessly old-fashioned. But if you like the sort of gameplay that Resident Evil offers, it will bring you a lot of enjoyment, more or less from start to finish."

The Daily Telegraph gave the Xbox 360 version a score of seven out of ten, saying that its "erratic, slapdash nature leaves you slightly dazed. But despite some alarming dips in quality, despite the game never quite reaching the level of brilliance you hope for, you will be glad you played it." The Digital Fix similarly gave the same console version seven out of ten, saying, "The game is certainly the closest to a mainstream title that Suda 51 has been involved in. Strangely, the most memorable aspects of the game actually are quite distant from the actual gameplay; the characters, the storybooks and the music are more memorable than any of the action set-pieces. Having said that, the game is worth at least one playthrough, especially if you enjoyed any of Suda 51's previous titles."

Digital Spy gave the same console version three stars out of five and said it was "not as scary as the likes of Silent Hill or Resident Evil, not as funny as No More Heroes and not as original as Killer7, leaving it stuck in video game limbo." The Escapist gave it a similar score of three stars out of five, saying that the game's "slick visuals and offbeat sensibility is worth checking out, despite its ordinary gameplay. Besides, ordinary doesn't mean bad. Beheading demons with a shotgun that fires skulls has a certain amount of appeal, after all. It's pretty brainless, but it's a weekend's worth of stuff to shoot, and sometimes that's all you really need." Edge gave the same console version a score of five out of ten, saying, "With a little more restraint and focus on the core experience, Shadows Of The Damned could have been the action thrill ride Garcia Hotspur thinks it is. Instead the game – like Hotspur himself – is all talk."

Within a week of its release, Shadows of the Damned sold approximately 24,000 units in North America for the Xbox 360 and PS3 combined, as well as an additional 9,145 units in Japan on the PlayStation 3.

== Legacy ==
The 2015 art book The Art of Grasshopper Manufacture heavily features art from the unused pitches for the game, including abandoned monster designs by Masahiro Ito, and explanations by Suda as to why EA refused Grasshopper Manufacture's plot and ideas four times. The 2013 videogame Black Knight Sword used plot points from the abandoned second direction for the game, most prominently the protagonist hanging himself at the start of the game, as seen in the art book, and the original dark fairy tale setting.

Following Shadows of the Damned, Shinji Mikami directed The Evil Within. The game features a mode titled "Kurayami" as part of its DLC. The mode is also built around light and darkness, which were important concepts in Kurayami.

The two volume manga Kurayami Dance: Dance in the Dark, first published in 2015 and written by Suda 51, is partially based on the abandoned first direction for the game. A villain named G uses the first abandoned design for Garcia.

The 2019 video game Travis Strikes Again: No More Heroes features a level titled "Damned Dark Knight", a fictitious sequel to Shadows of the Damned. The level strongly comments on the game's troubled development, with Garcia and Johnson being NPCs. Additionally, a villain named Alfred uses the second abandoned design for Garcia, and the female lead of Kurayami Dance also appears in a visual novel segment of the game.
