= Ghostwire: Tokyo =

2022 video game

- Developer: Tango Gameworks
- Publisher: Bethesda Softworks
- Director: Kenji Kimura
- Producers: Masato Kimura; Shinsaku Ohara
- Designer: Suguru Murakoshi
- Programmer: Yuji Nakayama
- Writers: Syoji Ishimine; Seiji Ebihara; Kenji Kimura
- Composer: Masatoshi Yanagi
- Engine: Unreal Engine 4
- Platforms: PlayStation 5; Windows; Xbox Series X/S
- Release: PS5, Windows; March 25, 2022; Xbox Series X/S; April 12, 2023
- Genre: Action-adventure
- Mode: Single-player

Ghostwire: Tokyo is a 2022 horror action-adventure game developed by Tango Gameworks and published by Bethesda Softworks. The game is directed by Kenji Kimura, who also co-wrote the narrative with Syoji Ishimine and Seiji Ebihara. The story is set in a fictionalized interpretation of Tokyo, Japan that has been overrun by supernatural entities unleashed on the city by an occultist. The player character, a boy named Akito who was fatally injured in a car crash, is found and possessed by a spirit who imbues him with several abilities, allowing him to fight against the specters, investigate the disappearances of Tokyo's population, and save his family.

The game is played from a first-person perspective, with the player primarily navigating through a set of linear, narrative-driven environments around Tokyo in a mission-based structure. The player has access to several elemental abilities as a result of Akito's spiritual possession, granting him combat-based skills that are able to be utilized offensively against the specter-based standard enemies and larger boss encounters, as well as melee attacks and a physical parry that are likewise able to be upgraded in a skill tree by generating enough experience from combat. The game additionally boasts several side-missions off the main story path that reward the player with various collectibles and items that can augment Akito's abilities while providing further context on the game's world and characters.

The game was announced during Bethesda's E3 2019 press conference by its executive producer Shinji Mikami and Ikumi Nakamura, who originally served as the game's creative director before departing Tango Gameworks that September, by which point Kimura took over said role. The game's action combat, a departure from the survival horror gameplay of the studio's prior The Evil Within series, was designed by Shinichirō Hara, drawing primary inspiration from martial arts disciplines and the ritualistic mudras of kuji-kiri.

Ghostwire: Tokyo was released on March 25, 2022 for Windows and PlayStation 5, where it remained a timed console-exclusive for one year. A version of the game for Xbox Series X/S was later released on April 12, 2023 alongside the free content update "Spider's Thread", which introduced new enemy types, unlockable skills, side-missions, story cinematics and areas within Tokyo to explore. The game received favorable reviews upon launch, with praise directed towards the game design, presentation and narrative, while the lack of technical polish, limited depth of combat and repetitive game content drew divisive reactions.

== Gameplay ==
Ghostwire: Tokyo is an open world action-adventure game played from a first-person perspective. The player can use various psychic and paranormal abilities to defeat the ghosts and spirits haunting Tokyo. Combat director Shinichiro Hara described the combat as "karate meets magic", as the player character utilizes hand movements inspired by kuji-kiri hand gestures to cast spells. When an enemy loses most of their health, its core is exposed and the player can use takedown moves to destroy it. By defeating these spirits and collecting Yokai, the character will collect spirit points and resources used to upgrade their abilities.

== Plot ==
The game begins with a spirit (Kazuhiko Inoue / Stephen Oyoung) flying over the scene of a traffic collision. The spirit is looking for a body to possess and decides on a boy named Akito Izuki (Kensuke Nishi / Cory Yee) who was rendered unconscious from the accident. Akito wakes up, still in control of his body except for his right hand, which is under control of the spirit. Soon after, a terrifying fog rolls in, turning anyone caught in it into a spirit, but Akito is spared thanks to the spirit possessing him. A man in a Hannya mask (known only as Hannya (Shunsuke Sakuya / Feodor Chin) appears on the digital signs near the area and uses a spell to summon evil entities, known as visitors, sealing the disembodied spirits of the civilians away in cages all across Shibuya. Akito is told by the spirit he needs to hunt Hannya down to stop him, but Akito convinces the spirit to let him go check on his sister, Mari Izuki (Asami Seto / Anne Yatco), who is in a coma at the local hospital.

The spirit grants Akito spirit-based powers to help him fight his way to Mari's room, but find that Hannya has beat them there and wants to use Mari for some sort of ritual. When Akito tries to interfere, Hannya stabs him through the chest and kidnaps Mari. As he lays dying, Akito has a flashback, showing that Mari is comatose due to a house fire. Akito talks to the spirit (who tells Akito to call him KK) and agrees to help him stop Hannya. KK saves Akito's life and tells him to go to a safe house KK had set up before he died.

At the safe house, KK reveals he was part of a team of investigators that tried to stop Hannya but failed. He sends Akito to the Kagerie Observation Tower to scan the town for clues. There, they spot one of Hannya's allies entering an underground train station. Following the ally, they discover an underground shrine where Hannya and his team are preparing for a ritual. KK explains that Hannya plans to steal enough souls to destroy the barrier between the living and the dead, allowing him to resurrect his deceased wife and daughter. Hannya and his allies escape, leaving Akito to fight one of Hannya's allies. During the battle, the enemy's mask is blown off, revealing it to be a puppet made from KK's human body. The puppet takes advantage of KK's shock to separate him from Akito and seal him away, leaving Akito powerless.

Akito manages to escape to the surface and heads back to KK's safe house to figure out how to find him. There he meets one of KK's old partners, Rinko, who gives him KK's commuter pass case and a picture of KK's wife and son. Rinko also helps Akito use his lingering connection to KK to find and reunite with him. Just as the two reunite, a pillar of light appears, showing that Hannya has started his ritual. The two pursue Hannya and confront him. Hannya's two other allies reveal themselves to be puppets made from Hannya's wife and daughter. Akito defeats the daughter puppet, but is delayed enough for Hannya to unleash a giant spirit monster upon the town and escape into the toxic fog.

Unable to follow on foot, KK reveals that Rinko made a custom motorcycle capable of passing through the fog. After collecting additional parts to complete the bike, the two travel to Tokyo Tower and confront the mother puppet. At the top of the tower, Hannya takes Mari and jumps into the mouth of the giant spirit monster. Akito is attacked by the KK puppet again but manages to destroy it.

Akito and KK follow Hannya into the giant's mouth. Inside, they pass through a series of doors representing Akito and Mari's memories, revealing that Akito was an emotionally closed off person, which was only exacerbated by his parents' deaths. With the loss of her parents and Akito's coldness towards her, Mari fell into an almost suicidal depression. The two heroes catch up to Hannya as he opens a direct gate to the underworld, but before he can finish the ritual, Mari's spirit appears and throws him into the gate. As her spirit starts to fade away, she tells Akito that her accident wasn't his fault. She reveals that she had a chance to escape the fire but went back to grab their parents' wedding rings as they were the only thing they had left of them. As Mari dies, Hannya climbs back out and fuses himself with his daughter and wife's spirits, turning himself into a monstrous amalgamation. The two heroes finish him off for good, freeing all the souls Hannya captured. The spirits of Akito's parents arrive to escort Mari to the afterlife as Akito promises her that he'll lead a good life from then on. With the crisis averted, Akito returns to the living world and KK's spirit leaves his body permanently.

== Development ==
In June 2019, during Bethesda Softworks's press conference at E3 2019, Shinji Mikami and creative director Ikumi Nakamura announced Ghostwire: Tokyo, an action-adventure game with horror elements. Nakamura later resigned from Tango Gameworks in September 2019, leaving the studio after nine years. Unlike The Evil Within series of video games, Ghostwire is primarily an action-adventure game instead of a survival horror game, though the game still retains some horror themes and elements. Shinichirō Hara, who worked on the combat of 2016's Doom, joined Tango to help the team craft the game's action-oriented combat. According to him, the game's combat, which was largely inspired by kuji-kiri and martial arts, enabled the team to "put a lot more movement and personality into the player action as the player's hands are organic extensions of the character". The game uses Unreal Engine 4.

On September 21, 2020, Bethesda Softworks' parent company, ZeniMax Media and Microsoft announced Microsoft's intent to buy ZeniMax and its studios, including Tango Gameworks, for US$7.5 billion, incorporating the studios as part of Xbox Game Studios, with the sale finalized on March 9, 2021. Xbox Game Studios head Phil Spencer said that this deal would not affect the pre-existing plan to release Ghostwire: Tokyo as a console-exclusive on the PlayStation 5, and the game would eventually arrive on Xbox consoles at least one year after the initial release. Those who pre-ordered the Deluxe Edition via PlayStation Store were granted early access to the game on March 22, 2022. The game released for PlayStation 5 and Windows on March 25, 2022.

On March 15, 2023, the game was announced to be releasing for the Xbox Series X/S on April 12, 2023 alongside a new content update for the game.

== Reception ==
Reception

Aggregate scores
Aggregator	Score
Metacritic	PC: 78/100; PS5: 75/100; XSXS: 82/100
OpenCritic	67% recommend

Review scores
Publication	Score
Destructoid	7.5/10
Easy Allies	8/10
Electronic Gaming Monthly	4/5
Famitsu	9/10, 9/10, 10/10, 9/10
Game Informer	8/10
GameRevolution	8/10
GameSpot	8/10
GamesRadar+	3.5/5
Hardcore Gamer	3.5/5
IGN	7/10
PC Gamer (US)	72/100
PCGamesN	7/10
PCMag	3/5
Push Square	6/10
RPGamer	4/5
Shacknews	9/10
VentureBeat	3/5
VG247	4/5
VideoGamer.com	7/10

Ghostwire: Tokyo received "generally favorable" reviews from critics, according to review aggregator Metacritic. Fellow review aggregator OpenCritic assessed that the game received strong approval, being recommended by 67% of critics. In Japan, four critics from Famitsu gave the game a total score of 37 out of 40, with one critic awarding the game a perfect 10.

Reviewers linked the lack of polish and antiquated nature of the game's action elements to a "different era of action game design", while others, though reviewing the title positively, acknowledged the narrow target audience due to said elements.

Combat was criticized for lacking depth through its lack of combos, rudimentary skill tree, and slow and imprecise movement, but was praised for its engaging presentation, kinetic feel, and its use of the DualSense controller. Movement was also criticized for being slow and imprecise during combat. Several review outlets felt that the Ghostwire: Tokyo's premise was largely compelling, and that its story and characters were tightly written, but that none of these elements were fully realized.

Many outlets also claimed that the game felt particularly uninspired and repetitive after a while, and that it failed to do anything new or interesting with its premise in terms of gameplay. They also felt that the game's structure of cleansing gates was largely repetitive and criticized the underutilized potential of the linearly designed open world. The visual style and theming, atmosphere, dense design, and compact scale of the world was largely praised.

Some commended side quests for their weirder tones, engaging design, and short length, while others criticized them for being unmemorable and repetitive. Enemies were heavily praised for their haunting designs, but were criticized for the lack of variety and unchallenging design. Bosses in particular were deemed underwhelming in nature.

Prior to release, a number of outlets noted technical issues with the PC version of the game, citing stuttering as an issue.

The PlayStation 5 version of Ghostwire: Tokyo was the sixth bestselling retail game during its first week on sale in Japan, with 10,144 physical copies being sold.

The game won the Award for Excellence at the 2022 Japan Game Awards. The game has reached 4 million players by May 2023. And reached 6 million players by September 2023.

== Future ==
A sequel to Ghostwire: Tokyo was mentioned in Bethesda's internal roadmap as scheduled for the 2024 fiscal year period ending March 2025. Tango Gameworks was closed by Microsoft as part of a significant restructure of Bethesda's operations in May 2024, leaving the game's future uncertain. While Tango Gameworks would be acquired, following its closure, in August of 2024 by South Korean firm Krafton Inc., the sale did not include the rights to Ghostwire: Tokyo, which are still held by Bethesda and Microsoft.
