= Lisa Barr =

American journalist and novelist

- Born: Deerfield, Illinois, U.S.
- Writing career
- Genres: Historical, Thriller
- Website: lisabarr.com

Lisa Barr (born 29 August) is an American novelist, editor, and a journalist. Her novel Fugitive Colors won the IPPY gold medal for “Best Literary Fiction 2014”. As an editor she previously worked at The Jerusalem Post, Today’s Chicago Woman, Moment magazine and Chicago Sun-Times.

== Personal life ==
Barr was born on 29 August in Deerfield, Illinois to a Jewish family. She is the grandchild of a Holocaust survivor.

While in high school, Barr was used as bait to help break a sex trafficking ring after a special law enforcement unit approached her as part of an internship.

Barr's husband later left her and their two daughters. In the years following, Barr worked full time as an editor while fighting a custody battle. Today, Barr is married and has three daughters. She lives in the Chicago area.

== Career ==
=== Writing career ===
Barr debuted with her novel Fugitive Colors in 2012, which won an IPPY Award.

She has written 4 novels.

In 2022, Sharon Stone signed a deal to produce and star in a film adaptation of Barr's novel Woman On Fire.

=== Journalism ===
Barr has worked at many newspapers including The Jerusalem Post, Today’s Chicago Woman, Moment magazine and Chicago Sun-Times.

In the 90s Barr covered the famous “handshake” between the late Israeli Prime Minister Yitzhak Rabin, the late PLO leader Yasser Arafat and President Bill Clinton at the White House. After Rabin's assassination she interviewed Leah Rabin, his wife.

Activism

In 2023, Barr was one of the founding members of Artists Against Antisemitism, a group of American Jewish writers that donated items for an auction to raise awareness of antisemitism and promote education about Jewish history and culture. The auction raised funds for Project Shema.

== Bibliography ==
- Fugitive Colors (2012)
- The Unbreakables (2019)
- Woman on Fire (2022)
- The Goddess of Warsaw (2024)

== Awards ==
Fugitive Colors

- Hollywood Film Festival for "Best Unpublished Manuscript"
- 2014 - IPPY gold medal for “Best Literary Fiction 2014”
