= The Evil Within 2 =

2017 video game

- Developer: Tango Gameworks
- Publisher: Bethesda Softworks
- Director: John Johanas
- Producer: Shinsaku Ohara
- Designer: Shigenori Nishikawa
- Programmers: Toshihiko Tsuji; Taichi Machino
- Writers: Trent Haaga; Syoji Ishimine
- Composer: Masatoshi Yanagi
- Engine: STEM Engine
- Platforms: PlayStation 4; Windows; Xbox One
- Release: WW: October 13, 2017; JP: October 19, 2017
- Genre: Survival horror
- Mode: Single-player

The Evil Within 2 (Note: Known in Japan as PsychoBreak 2 (Japanese: サイコブレイク2, Hepburn: Saiko Bureiku 2)) is a 2017 survival horror game developed by Tango Gameworks and published by Bethesda Softworks. The game is the sequel to 2014's The Evil Within.

The Evil Within 2 was released for PlayStation 4, Windows, and Xbox One in October 2017. The game received generally positive reviews from critics; like its predecessor, it received praise for its visuals, atmosphere and gameplay, but received some criticism for its story and characters.

== Gameplay ==
Sebastian exploring the world

Similar to its predecessor, The Evil Within 2 is a survival horror video game. Played from a third-person perspective or a first-person perspective, the player assumes control of detective Sebastian Castellanos, who must descend into the world of Union to rescue his daughter, Lily. There are five difficulty modes, namely Casual, which producer Shinji Mikami recommends, Survival, Nightmare, which is the setting recommended for players who enjoyed the difficulty curve in the previous game, Classic, which is mostly identical to Nightmare, but limits the number of saves and removes upgrades, and Akumu, which is also mostly identical to Nightmare, but causes the player to die in a single hit from anything. In The Evil Within 2, maps are larger and there are multiple ways for players to advance in a level. The player is also given an item known as "The Communicator", which helps to highlight the objectives, resources and enemies featured in the game's world. It also reveals Resonance points, which provides hints regarding what had happened in the world of Union. Players can explore the map area freely to complete side objectives and scout for resources, which are scarce. Players can engage in direct confrontation with enemies using weapons like guns, or use stealth to prevent themselves from being noticed or sneak behind enemies to kill them silently.

The game features a crafting system, in which players can gather resources to craft new items such as ammo. Players can craft items at any time in the game, but doing so in a workbench requires fewer crafting materials. A customization system is also present. The Green Gel, introduced in the first game, can be used to customize Sebastian's abilities, which are divided into five different trees: health, stealth, combat, recovery and athleticism. Weapons can be customized using the weapon parts players collected through exploring Union.

In February 2018, a free update was released that added an option to play the game from a first-person perspective.

== Plot ==
Three years after the events of the first game, Sebastian Castellanos (Marqus Bobesich / Hiroyuki Kinoshita) has left the Krimson City Police Department, haunted by his experiences at the Beacon Mental Hospital. His only child, Lily (Kiara Gamboa / Sakura Sakai), supposedly perished in their house fire, and his wife Myra (Elizabeth Saydah / Rika Fukami), unwilling to accept her daughter's death, abandoned him. This, coupled with his trauma, results in Sebastian descending into alcoholism. Drowning his sorrows in a bar, Sebastian is approached by former partner and Mobius agent Juli Kidman (Meg Saricks / Yūko Kaida), who reveals that Lily is still alive. Sebastian is brought to a secret Mobius facility against his will, where he meets the head of the facility named the Administrator (Richard Neil / Jin Yamanoi). The Administrator explains that Lily is being used as the Core for a new STEM system to simulate an idyllic American town called Union. However, Mobius lost contact with Lily and their agents inside Union, and they have lost control over the simulation. Sebastian reluctantly agrees to help and is plugged into STEM.

Upon entering Union, Sebastian discovers the town has turned into a nightmare realm where all of the inhabitants were either killed or mutated into monsters. In addition, Sebastian witnesses a mysterious photographer with supernatural powers hunting down and murdering Mobius operatives. He manages to find surviving Mobius personnel Liam O'Neal (Jesse LeNoir / Takuya Masumoto), Yukiko Hoffman (Ying Hsiao / Mayumi Sako), and Julian Sykes (Hari Williams / Tōru Sakurai), who help him in the search for Lily. As Sebastian follows her trail, he learns that she has been kidnapped by the war photographer Stefano Valentini (Rafael Goldstein / Setsuji Satō), a serial killer obsessed with photographing people at the moment of their death who managed to infiltrate Union. Stefano reveals that he had originally kidnapped Lily under orders from another party, but decided to keep her for himself to exploit her powers as the Core. Sebastian fights and kills Stefano but before he can rescue Lily, Myra appears and takes Lily away. Sebastian finds himself transported to the interior of a mysterious stronghold-like area, where he is approached by Father Theodore Wallace (Ron Sewer / Tesshō Genda), who attempts to convince Sebastian to join him to seize Lily from Myra since Stefano betrayed him. Sebastian refuses and is banished to a forest outside Union where he meets with Mobius operative Esmeralda Torres (Crash Barrera / Tomo Muranaka). Upon reaching her safe house, Torres reveals that she, Kidman, Myra, and Theodore had conspired to break Lily out of STEM and destroy Mobius from within via their chip implants. However, the plan went awry when Theodore became mentally unstable and decided to kidnap Lily for himself.

Seeing Theodore as the most immediate threat, Sebastian goes to confront him, but is forced to kill a brainwashed Liam. Upon reaching Theodore, Sebastian is immediately incapacitated when Theodore uses Sebastian's own lingering guilt against him and he falls unconscious. Sebastian is visited by a vision of Myra, who assures him that what happened to Lily was not his fault and that he should focus on saving her. When he wakes up, he finds out that Esmeralda had sacrificed herself to get him to safety and that Theodore has erected his stronghold in the center of Union. Both Sebastian and Yukiko assault Theodore's stronghold, though Yukiko dies in the process. Sebastian is able to confront and defeat Theodore, only for Myra to arrive and kill Theodore herself while warning Sebastian to stay away from her and Lily.

Sebastian follows Myra, whose desire to protect Lily has made her insane and obsessed with keeping Lily locked in the STEM for her own "safety". Myra lashes out at him, forcing him to shoot her, triggering her transformation into a large being called 'The Matriarch', forcing Sebastian to reluctantly battle her. Sebastian defeats the monster, releasing Myra and knocking her back to her senses. He prepares to take Lily out of STEM, but Myra refuses to follow, explaining that as part of the plan to destroy Mobius, she must take Lily's place as the Core of STEM to transmit the implant-destroying signal. Meanwhile, in the real world, Kidman is ordered by the Administrator to eliminate Sebastian. She disobeys him and helps Sebastian and Lily escape the STEM while Myra enacts her plan, killing the Administrator and all Mobius operatives (except Kidman who has removed the microchip from her brain). Now free from Mobius, Sebastian, Lily, and Kidman leave the facility.

In a post-credits scene, Sebastian parts ways with Kidman and goes off to live a new life with Lily. Back at the now abandoned Mobius facility, the STEM system mysteriously reactivates itself.

== Development ==
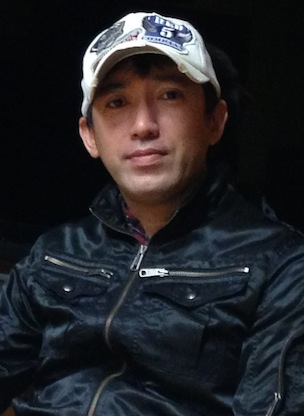
Shinji Mikami, director of the first game, supervised The Evil Within 2's development.

Development for The Evil Within 2 began in March 2015, after the team at Tango Gameworks wrapped up the development of the downloadable content for the first game. Director Shinji Mikami stepped down and became game producer and supervised the game's development. Mikami said the development period was quite a bit shorter than it had been for its predecessor. The director role was assigned to John Johanas, described by Mikami as a person with "a lot of talent".

The story of the game was penned by Syoji Ishimine and Trent Haaga. One of their focuses was to make the game's story easier for players to comprehend and understand, a response to the criticism of the first game where the game's plot gets too complicated by the end. Shifting realities, a feature in the first game, also returns in the sequel but according to Johanas, "there's a bit more logic to when and how it happens".

The 2.5:1 aspect ratio featured in the first game was removed due to the mixed response this design choice had received upon its release, even though the team liked it. While the game retains the gore-horror featured prominently in the original game, the writing team also put effort into creating the game's psychological horror aspect, as the game tells a story that is more personal.

Unlike its predecessor, which ran on id Software's id Tech 5 engine, The Evil Within 2 runs on the STEM engine, an offshoot of id Tech that was custom developed by Tango Gameworks for the game.

== Release ==
In August 2016, Pete Hines, an executive from publisher Bethesda Softworks, revealed that The Evil Within had sold enough copies to warrant a sequel, though he declined to comment on whether a new game is in development.

The Evil Within 2 was leaked in March 2017, in which a job description for Psycho Break 2, the game's Japanese title, was leaked. An advertisement for the game was prematurely posted on Reddit, several hours prior to the game's official announcement at Bethesda's Electronic Entertainment Expo 2017 press conference.

The Evil Within 2 was released for PlayStation 4, Windows, and Xbox One on October 13, 2017.

== Reception ==
Reception

Aggregate score
Aggregator	Score
Metacritic	XONE: 82/100; PC: 80/100; PS4: 76/100

Review scores
Publication	Score
Destructoid	7/10
Electronic Gaming Monthly	8/10
Game Informer	7.75/10
GameRevolution	3.5/5
GameSpot	8/10
GamesRadar+	3.5/5
IGN	8/10
PC Gamer (US)	80/100
Polygon	9/10

=== Critical reception ===
The Evil Within 2 received "generally favorable" reviews from critics, according to review aggregator website Metacritic.

Ray Porreca's score of 7/10 on Destructoid said it was "Solid and definitely has an audience. There could be some hard-to-ignore faults, but the experience is fun."

Mollie L Patterson said in Electronic Gaming Monthly: "Though I never expected to ever see a sequel to The Evil Within, we've now gotten one, and I'm rather glad that we did. While The Evil Within 2 isn't without problems—and I'm not sure it's the kind of game I'll ever want to play through a second time—by the time the final credits rolled, I had legitimately enjoyed the adventure I'd just gone on, and the improvements that Tango Gameworks had tried to bring to the series."

Game Informer's Suriel Vazquez awarded the game a 7.75/10, stating: "The Evil Within 2 is a solid horror game that expands the scope of the series to extend out of the shadow of a titan in the horror genre, even if it sometimes leans heavily on borrowed ideas. Its progression and difficulty curve create a satisfying loop that repays resourcefulness and strategy, but its set pieces and structure don't build enough on the many ideas they borrow to make them feel new or interesting. The result is a ride that offers some fun thrills in the moment, but I don't think I'll lose too much sleep over these particular nightmares."

Paul Tamburro of Game Revolution awarded it 3.5 out of 5 stars stating that "The Evil Within 2 is a worthy sequel that makes a number of bold decisions. For those solely looking for the survival horror thrills of the first game, its spotlight upon combat will likely be a disappointment, as will its introduction of a dull open world. However, there's plenty tucked away in The Evil Within 2 that will appeal to both fans of the original and new players, with it presenting a mix of Mikami's best ideas and John Johanas' new direction. It's certainly not what I was expecting, but in a good way."

Alessandro Fillari's 8/10 score on GameSpot stated: "Though there's some occasional technical hiccups that result in some particularly frustrating moments and weird pacing issues, this horror sequel elevates the tense and impactful survival horror experience in ways that feel fresh and exciting. What this cerebral horror game does isn't totally new, but it rarely feels routine, and offers plenty of surprises. Coming in at a lengthy and surprisingly packed 15-hour campaign, the sequel does an admirable job of ratcheting up the tension and scares when it needs to, while also giving you the freedom to explore and proceed how you want. It's a tough thing to balance, but The Evil Within 2 does it remarkably well, and in a way that leaves a strong and lasting impression after its touching conclusion."

Lucas Sullivan from GamesRadar gave the game a score of 3.5 out of 5 stars, saying that "Though it doesn't outdo its predecessor, The Evil Within 2 delivers another fun, challenging, tense horror headtrip that should delight fans of the first game."

Lucy O'Brien of IGN gave the game 8/10, concluding that "The Evil Within 2 is an intense and exhilarating survival horror experience."

80/100 was Joe Donnelly's score on PC Gamer and said it was "An intense and thrilling psychological survival horror sequel that improves on its forerunner in almost every way."

"The Evil Within 2 represents one of the starkest and most astounding turnarounds from a debut title to its sequel that I've ever witnessed. It's a brilliant horror game, one that understands when to ratchet up tension and when to pull back and let you collect yourself. If the first game was a failed attempt to capture the spirit of Shinji Mikami's classic Resident Evil 4, the sequel is a successful attempt at something much better: finding a chilling, exhilarating voice of its own," was Philip Kollar's conclusion on Polygon with a score of 9/10. The website later ranked the game 21st on their list of the 50 best games of 2017.

=== Sales ===
In Japan, The Evil Within 2 sold 42,941 units on PlayStation 4 within its first week on sale, which placed it at number three on the all-format sales chart.

=== Accolades ===
The game was nominated for "Best Action Game" in PC Gamer's 2017 Game of the Year Awards, for "Best Action-Adventure Game" in IGN's Best of 2017 Awards and for "Game, Franchise Action" at the National Academy of Video Game Trade Reviewers Awards.
