= Steel Battalion: Line of Contact =

2004 video game

- North American box art
- Developers: Capcom Production Studio 4; Nude Maker
- Publisher: Capcom
- Director: Hifumi Kono
- Producer: Atsushi Inaba
- Artist: Sawaki Takeyasu
- Composer: Masafumi Takada
- Platform: Xbox
- Release: JP: February 26, 2004; NA: February 26, 2004; EU: March 26, 2004
- Genre: Vehicle simulation
- Mode: Multiplayer

Steel Battalion: Line of Contact (Note: Japanese: 鉄騎大戦, Hepburn: Tekki Taisen) is a 2004 video game created by Capcom for the original Xbox. It is the online-only (via the Xbox Live broadband gaming service) sequel to Capcom's Steel Battalion (2002). The game was jointly developed by Capcom Production Studio 4 and Nude Maker. Gameplay is similar to that of the previous Steel Battalion game, utilizing the same two-joystick, three-pedal, four-button controller.

In the game, players engage in mechanized combat using "Vertical Tanks", the game terminology for very large, bipedal combat platforms. Vertical Tanks (VTs) are fictional vehicles that range in height from 8–15 meters. In the game's fictional universe, they have become the platform of choice for future combat in the year 2084.

The campaign mode for Steel Battalion: Line of Contact was taken offline on September 30, 2005.

== Gameplay ==
Gameplay is entirely online and consists of various game types such as deathmatch and capture the flag. Up to ten players (five against five) can participate, and each player must have an Xbox, Xbox Live, and a special controller to play the game. However, at this time in everywhere except Japan, matches are limited to 3 vs. 3 with some 4 vs. 4 and rare 5 vs. 5 combat. Players connecting with less than 100 kB/s upload and 300 kB/s download are usually limited to 4-on-4 or 3-on-3 combat. There is no single-player mode available. A total of 10 new VTs are introduced in the game, for a total of 31 different models in the series. After having their VT destroyed during an online match, the player must go through the entire start-up process again before re-spawning onto the battlefield.

Steel Battalion: Line of Contact was an online-only expansion to the original Steel Battalion. Although the game also supports a System Link mode via a local area network (LAN), the logistics of outfitting for LAN-based play are quite daunting. Each player must have an Xbox, Steel Battalion controller, game disc, and display. Due to System Link support, the game can be played online through LAN tunnelling solutions such as XLink Kai. Steel Battalion: Line of Contact multiplayer is now playable online again on the rebuilt Xbox Live servers called Insignia.

Before the closure of the Campaign servers, two modes of play existed for online combat: Campaign Mode and Free Mission mode.

=== Campaign Mode ===
Campaign Mode took place on a persistent battlefield where up to four factions engaged in mechanized combat to control landmass areas in the fictional Southeast Asian nation of Ocean City Island. The overall campaign progress was divided into rounds, each of which would last a total of eight weeks. Each week within a Round was termed a Turn, during which three Mission maps were available to select as the battle arena. At the beginning of each Round, on Turn one, players were required to select a faction in which to participate. Initially, there were only two factions to select from, the Hai Shi Dao and the Pacific Rim Forces. With the arrival of Turn three, a third, independent faction became available for pilots to transfer their allegiance to, the Right Brothers. Turn five would offer the option to transfer to the Jaralaccs Mercenary Forces. Turns would continue to progress over the eight weeks, after which the game would then return to Turn one and begin a new Round.

Each Turn would dictate the Vertical Tanks available for purchase from the Supply Bin of each faction.

- Hai Shi Dao (HSD) – in Steel Battalion: Line of Contact, the Hai Shi Dao are presented as a strongly patriotic nation who are actively resisting the occupying army of the Pacific Rim Forces.
  - HSD 1st Gen VTs: Vitzh, Vortex, m-Vitzh, Scare Face, Scare Face A1
  - HSD 2nd Gen VTs: Scare Face II, Maelstrom, Garpike, Behemoth
  - HSD 3rd Gen VTs: Regal Dress N, Regal Dress A, Juggernaut
- Pacific Rim Forces (PRF) – unlike in the original Steel Battalion, the sequel casts the Pacific Rim Forces in a much darker light, having them play the part of invading oppressors against the Hai Shi Dao nationalists.
  - PRF 1st Gen VTs: Decider, Falchion, Decider Volcanic
  - PRF 2nd Gen VTs: Prominence M1, Prominence M2, Prominence M3, Blade, Rapier
  - PRF 3rd Gen VTs: Quasar
- Right Brothers (RB) – only available after Turn three of each Round, the Right Brothers are fierce individualist freedom fighters, adept at using guerilla tactics and specialized Vertical Tank equipment to defend the native lands of their ancestors.
  - RB 1st Gen VTs: Colt, Colt Executive
  - RB 2nd Gen VTs: Yellow Jacket, Sheepdog, Siegeszug
  - RB 3rd Gen VTs: Earthshaker
- Jaralaccs Mercenary Forces (JAR) – the only "faction" that does not fight for its land, the Jaralaccs Mercenaries are able to participate on behalf of any faction within the context of an individual mission and individual pilots could switch their loyalties from mission-to-mission. They first enter the conflict in Turn five of the Round. The Vertical Tanks of the Jaralaccs are much more durable and suited to individualistic fighting tactics, but also more expensive.
  - JAR 1st Gen VTs: Vitzh, m-Vitzh
  - JAR 2nd Gen VTs: Jaralacss N, Jaralaccs C, **Jaralaccs NS-R, Jaralaccs Macabre

The Jaralaccs Macabre was initially classed as a 3rd generation VT during the Line of Contact beta test period and its performance profile still reflects this lineage despite its current 2nd generation classification.

Vertical Tanks are classed across several different performance specifications, with the most generalized being Generation. 1st Generation VTs are generally slower, less responsive, and have lower armor ratings, firepower, or range. These units are generally very cheap in comparison to the later generations and are easily disposable on the battlefield. 2nd Generation VTs have increased armor, speed, and performance capabilities. 3rd Generation VTs are the epitome of VT design and performance, but also very expensive to field. The loss of 3rd generation machines within a battle often results in defeat, though fielding the 3rd generation VT afforded a team an advantage.

Beyond the Generation classification, VTs are further distinguished by the tactical role for which they are primarily designed, including Standard Combat, Support (artillery), Assault (frontline combat), Scout (reconnaissance), and Light (typically fast hit-and-run assault VTs).

Players participate in missions, the result of which determines the number of Supply and Command points they are awarded. Supply points are used to purchase additional Vertical Tanks from the Supply Bin of a pilot's respective faction. Command points are accrued and determine the rank of the pilot profile.

The Supply Bin for each faction could contain both "mass-produced" and "limited-edition" Vertical Tanks. The mass-produced variety was continuously available, whereas the limited types could only be purchased if units were available. Typically, the more powerful and expensive VTs were classed as limited. Each VT had a serial number which marked it as unique, thus allowing players to "own" specific VTs within the game world. Due to a flawed resource management design in the programming of the Campaign server, there were no facilities for reallocating limited VTs back into the active pilot community. As a result of both normal player attrition and rampant use of two-month Xbox Live trial cards, innumerable limited class VTs were forever locked up against pilot profiles for Xbox Live players who no longer actively played the game. This resulted in a massive shortage of limited VTs as the game world progressed.

Players would purchase VTs from the Supply Bin to use in missions. When these VTs were not actively being fielded, they would be stored in a virtual hangar space for each player, which was retained on the Campaign server. Each VT would have both a Sortie Point and Supply Point value, the latter being the value required to purchase the VT from the Supply Bin. The Sortie Point value was a "weight" that the vehicle would debit from a team if destroyed in a battle. This value was also used to limit the number of VTs a single player could own, with a maximum of 600 Sortie Points in available hangar space being allocated to each player profile.

In the Campaign Mode, players had to purchase multiple copies of the same type of VT to remain in the conflict.

On September 30, 2005, Capcom ended the Campaign portion of Line of Contact. Free Mission mode was still supported and continued to be popular with LoC players up until April 15, 2010, when support for the original version of Xbox Live was dropped, but the LAN portion of the game, which is similar to Free Mission mode, is still played online using XLink Kai.

=== Free Mission ===
Free Mission mode relied only on the Xbox Live matchmaking services for players to host sessions, thus no external servers were required. Unlike Campaign Mode, Free Mission did not have a complex economy or persistent online conflict. Instead players hosted individual battle sessions using both the original campaign "Conquest" mode of play, as well as "Battle Royale" and "Capture the Container". The LAN portion of the game works similarly to the Xbox Live Free Mission mode.

==== Conquest ====
Conquest mode follows much the same formula as Campaign did, with players participating in a single battle on opposing factional sides which are chosen by the host of the session.

==== Capture the Container ====
Capture the Container is very similar to traditional Capture the Flag type play modes from other online multiplayer games, but instead of a flag, each team attempts to steal a container from their enemy's base and return it to their own to score points. Bases may be captured, as in Conquest mode, and the flag may be returned to any base their team owns. VT combat is still in play but does not directly affect the outcome of the mission other than to eventually remove opposing players from the battle by eliminating their remaining vehicles.

==== Battle Royale ====
Battle Royale is considered a training mode, in which all Vertical Tanks appear on the overall map radar view. Additionally, the game mode is "every player for themselves" in a last-player standing fashion.

== Reception ==
Reception

Aggregate score
| Aggregator | Score |
|---|---|
| Metacritic | 70/100 |

Review scores
| Publication | Score |
|---|---|
| Edge | 8/10 |
| Famitsu | 30/40 |
| GameSpot | 7.3/10 |
| GameSpy | 4/5 |
| IGN | 8/10 |
| Official Xbox Magazine (US) | 8.1/10 |
| TeamXbox | 9/10 |
| Maxim | 6/10 |

The game received "average" reviews according to the review aggregation website Metacritic. In Japan, Famitsu gave it a score of one eight, two sevens, and one eight for a total of 30 out of 40. In Germany the game was not playable at launch, due to crashing servers, which resulted in magazines like GamePro Germany refused to give it a score.
