= Steel Battalion =

2002 video game

- North American box art
- Developers: Nude Maker; Capcom Production Studio 4
- Publisher: Capcom
- Director: Hifumi Kono
- Producer: Atsushi Inaba
- Artists: Hirokazu Yonezuka; Sawaki Takeyasu
- Composer: Naru Shirai
- Platform: Xbox
- Release: JP: September 12, 2002; NA: November 20, 2002; EU: March 28, 2003
- Genres: Action, vehicle simulation
- Mode: Single-player

Steel Battalion (Note: Japanese: 鉄騎, Hepburn: Tekki) is a 2002 video game created by Capcom for the Xbox console where the player controls a "Vertical Tank"—a bipedal, heavily armed mecha. To control the tank and play, the game requires the use of a large controller made specially for Steel Battalion. The controller consists of 44 input points, mainly buttons, but also uses two joysticks, a throttle handle, a radio channel dial, five switches, an eject button, and three foot pedals. Only limited quantities were made available. These quickly sold out, making the game a collector's piece. It has since been re-released in limited quantities worldwide, with blue controller buttons distinguishing it from the first edition with green buttons.

== Gameplay ==
At the beginning of every mission, the player must start up the machine and operating system; this is handled through a series of switches and buttons dedicated to this purpose. If a corner is turned too fast, the machine will tumble over. If the player's machine overheats, its operating system must be reset. The game even simulates window wipers in case of mud hitting the monitor. If the player does not eject when prompted, the player's in-game character will die and the game will delete its own saved data, prompting the player to start over.

Vertical tanks (VTs) are the vehicles piloted in the series. Essentially bipedal walking weapons platforms, VTs are classed by their developmental generation and sub-categorised by their combat role. Primary combat roles are standard combat, assault, support, scout, and fast attack. Vertical tanks are divided into three weight classes: light, medium and heavy. As the player progresses, new generations of VTs become available. This allows a newer, more advanced operating system, startup sequence, and combat functions, as well as a wider cockpit view and layout. New generation VTs also handle better and can provide better firepower than previous generations.

== Development ==
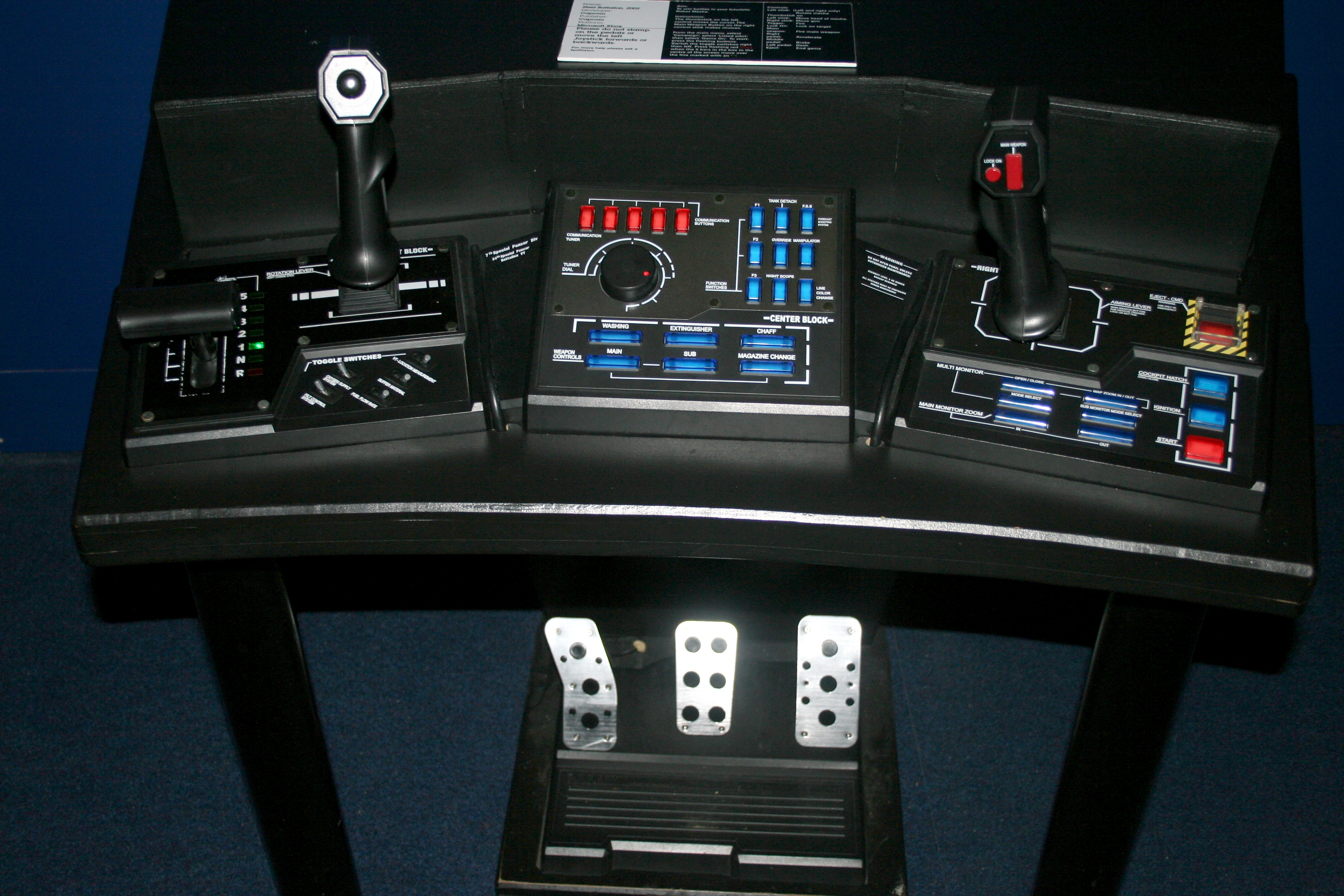
The re-released Steel Battalion controller, identifiable by its blue buttons.

Steel Battalion was developed by Nude Maker (former Human Entertainment developers) in collaboration with Capcom Production Studio 4. Inaba's superiors were skeptical about putting such a game on the market. The number of staff working on the project grew according to the team's experience with making new hardware. The earliest build of the game was created for the PlayStation 2. However, when the Xbox became available, the development team switched to it because of the system's greater power. Online play was taken out of consideration close to the development's start due to being too ambitious. While the game and its special controller received critical acclaim, the project turned little profit.

Steel Battalion was released for the Xbox in Japan on September 12, 2002.

== Reception ==
Reception

Aggregate score
Aggregator	Score
Metacritic	83/100

Review scores
Publication	Score
Edge	6/10
Electronic Gaming Monthly	8.5/10
Eurogamer	6/10
Famitsu	9/10, 8/10, 9/10, 9/10
Game Informer	9.5/10
GamePro	4.5/5
GameSpot	7.3/10
GameSpy	4/5
IGN	8.3/10
Official Xbox Magazine (US)	8.9/10

The game received "favorable" reviews according to the review aggregation website Metacritic. It was nominated for GameSpot's 2002 "Best Graphics (Artistic)" and "Best Game No One Played" awards among Xbox games, but also the publication's "Most Disappointing Game on Xbox" prize.

Steel Battalion was the fifth best-selling game during its week of release in Japan at about 15,092 copies. While less popular in the United States, an estimated 25,000 were sold during the initial launch of the game/controller combo. In Germany Capcom shipped only 500 units. Inaba concluded that the game ultimately broke even in terms of units shipped and units sold.

A reviewer on IGN wrote "where MechAssault and Robotech wouldn't let us into the cockpit, Steel Battalion won't let us out" and joked the US$200 cost was for the controller while the game disc was free.

== Sequels ==
A sequel called Steel Battalion: Line of Contact was released in 2004, and also used the game's unique controller. The third installment called Steel Battalion: Heavy Armor was released in June 2012. This installment uses the Kinect motion sensor control rather than the original controller.
