= The Evil Within =

2014 video game

- Developer: Tango Gameworks
- Publisher: Bethesda Softworks
- Director: Shinji Mikami
- Producer: Masato Kimura
- Designer: Shigenori Nishikawa
- Programmers: Hideaki Nakata; Hideyuki Miyashita
- Artist: Naoki Katakai
- Writers: Itaru Yokoyama; Keith Dwyer
- Composer: Masafumi Takada
- Engine: id Tech 5
- Platforms: Microsoft Windows; PlayStation 3; PlayStation 4; Xbox 360; Xbox One
- Release: EU/NA: October 14, 2014; AU: October 16, 2014; JP: October 23, 2014
- Genre: Survival horror
- Mode: Single-player

The Evil Within (Note: Known in Japan as PsychoBreak (Japanese: サイコブレイク, Hepburn: Saiko Bureiku)) is a 2014 survival horror game developed by Tango Gameworks and published by Bethesda Softworks. It was directed by Resident Evil series creator Shinji Mikami. The game centers on protagonist Sebastian Castellanos as he is pulled through a distorted world full of nightmarish locations and horrid creatures. Played in a third-person perspective, players battle disfigured nightmare-like enemies, including bosses, using guns and melee weapons, and progress through the levels, avoiding traps, using stealth, and finding collectables.

The Evil Within was released for PlayStation 3, PlayStation 4, Windows, Xbox 360, and Xbox One in October 2014. Upon release, the game received generally positive reviews from critics, who praised the game's horror elements, gameplay and atmosphere, while criticism was directed at the game's story, characters, and technical issues. A sequel, The Evil Within 2, was released in October 2017.

== Gameplay ==
The Evil Within utilizes a 2.35:1 aspect ratio for display, though a patch released in 2015 allowed players to play the game in full-screen, besides the menus and the cutscenes.

The single-player story is arranged in 15 chapters, which players complete in order to progress through the story. The game is played from a third-person perspective in which scavenging for supplies and learning when to fight or run are key to surviving the dangers of the game. Such dangers include: bear traps, barbed wire traps, bombs, and spike traps; 'The Haunted', the game's most common enemy; 'Reborn Laura', a multi limbed, long haired, crawling creature; Ruvik, the game's main antagonist; 'The Keeper', a large humanoid with a safe as a head who wields a large meat tenderizer hammer; and 'Sadist', a large humanoid wearing a spiked metal mask on his face, wielding a chainsaw covered in blood.

Sebastian Castellanos, the protagonist, needs to make use of the environment and things he may find in order to survive. The game world can transform during scripted events and as a result of player actions, altering locations and creating new paths or teleporting the player to new areas. Sebastian can find and use Syringes and Medical Kits to heal himself when injured. The Medical Kit expands Sebastian's health, but causes hallucinations to occur for a short time. Collecting vials of 'Green Gel' hidden throughout the game, players can upgrade Castellanos' abilities; more ammunition, extra stamina, and additional health are some of the upgrades.

Players have a safe house called 'Safe Haven' that can be accessed during scripted events and by finding bright glowing mirrors. The safe house is a mental hospital and has several accessible areas such as a save point, an upgrade room (where the player may upgrade Sebastian's skills), and the safe room where keys are used to open storage safes which contain useful items such as green gel and ammunition. These keys are collected by finding and breaking 'Madonna' statues hidden throughout the game's levels. There is a nurse called Tatiana who greets Sebastian when he teleports to the safe house.

The player has access to various weapons such as a revolver, shotgun, sniper rifle, knife, grenades, and the 'Agony Crossbow', a projectile weapon that fires bolts capable of freezing, blinding, electrocuting, or exploding enemies. Ammunition for weapons is very scarce, but mechanical components can be harvested to craft additional bolts. One source of components, bombs, are traps that react to the player's proximity or movement. Bombs can be stuck to walls or the floor, in chests, and in vending machines. The bombs can be disarmed via a minigame. Melee combat is designed only to create distance between the player and enemies, although the player can instantly kill some unaware enemies after sneaking behind them. Enemies that are downed or incapacitated are capable of reviving; to avoid this, players may set fire to the downed enemy using a limited supply of matches to permanently defeat them. Certain items in the environment, such as bottles, can be thrown to stun or distract enemies.

There are seven different types of collectables in The Evil Within: 'Personal Documents'; Sebastian's personal log, detailing his life as a detective and his life with his wife and daughter. 'Documents'; the personal logs of other characters. 'Map Fragments'; pieces of the game's map; once collected, they are stored at the safe house. If the player collects all 28 map fragments, they will unlock the Burst Handgun and the High-Penetration Sniper Rifle. 'Newspapers'; newspapers detailing events concerning or involving Sebastian. 'Missing Persons Posters'; posters of characters Sebastian encounters throughout the game who have been reported missing. 'Audio Tapes'; tapes containing a recording that can be played which are recorded by characters through the game. Collectables can be found in levels themselves or in the safe house.

The player unlocks several bonuses for completing the game. Extra weapons, character models and bios, 'Nightmare' and 'AKUMU' difficulties (the game's hardest difficulty levels, AKUMU being the hardest, which is stylized as "悪夢 -AKUMU-" and is the Japanese word for "nightmare"), and New Game+ are some of the unlocks. If the player completes the game on AKUMU mode, they'll unlock the Brass Knuckles weapon.

== Plot ==
While investigating the scene of a mass murder at Beacon Mental Hospital, Krimson City Police Detective Sergeant Sebastian Castellanos (Anson Mount), his partner Joseph Oda (Yuri Lowenthal), police officer Oscar Connelly (Kiff VandenHeuvel), and Junior Detective Juli Kidman (Jennifer Carpenter) find themselves suddenly thrown into an unreal world, after hearing a high-pitched noise. Shortly after this occurs, Sebastian is separated from his partners and is forced to flee from a monstrous man wielding a chainsaw. Upon reuniting with his colleagues, they attempt to escape via ambulance while Krimson City is destroyed by a massive earthquake, eventually causing them to crash. Freeing himself from the wreckage, Sebastian wanders through dark forests and abandoned buildings full of monstrous creatures and witnesses the apparition of a disfigured man in a white hood. Sebastian runs into Connelly, who is suffering from a strange form of transformation which compels him into a murderous rage. Sebastian is then forced to kill Connelly in self defense. Sebastian soon encounters one of Beacon's doctors, Marcelo Jimenez, who is searching for his patient, Leslie Withers. Jimenez identifies the hooded stranger stalking them as Ruvik.

Sebastian eventually reunites with Joseph, though it is shortly revealed that Joseph is suffering from the same murderous rage and transformation as Oscar. While he is able to control it for the most part, Joseph warns Sebastian to be wary of him if he turns. The two eventually find and rescue Kidman from drowning in a crude contraption, though they are soon separated again after hearing the high pitched noise.

Sebastian learns of the story of Ruvik, born Ruben Victoriano, through various memories that Ruvik places him in. Ruben was an intellectually gifted but mentally unstable child, and was close to his sister, Laura. While playing in a barn on their family's estate, Laura was killed, and Ruben was severely burned after the barn was set on fire by some farmers as an act of revenge against their parents. Due to his disfigurement from the fire, Ruben's father hid him in the basement of the family manor. Deeply traumatized over Laura's death, Ruben eventually killed both of his parents, took control of their fortune, and continued to "donate" money to Beacon Mental Hospital in exchange for test subjects for his experiments into the human psyche.

Ruvik began designing a virtual-reality program known as STEM as a means for him to reshape reality, so that he could physically travel back into his memories and live his life again with Laura. Jimenez then took notice of Ruvik's work, and revealed it to a shadowy organization known as Mobius, who wished to use it for their own purposes. As a safety measure, Ruvik calibrated STEM to work with only his brain as the core. In retaliation, Mobius simply killed him and extracted his brain for installation in order to use the machine, thus allowing Ruvik to maintain control of the STEM world. Kidman realizes that Mobius in fact wants the meek Leslie as a replacement for Ruvik's brain – an easily manipulated 'blank slate' mind, which they can use to power STEM and create a world of their own design.

When Jimenez, aided by Sebastian, tries to use Leslie to return to reality, he realizes that Ruvik wants to transfer his mind to a compatible host, and escape into the real world. A beast created from Ruvik's subconscious kills Jimenez, and Ruvik scatters the group across his mind. Kidman finds Leslie first and is about to shoot him to prevent Ruvik from using him as a host, when Sebastian and Joseph intervene, prompting her to shoot Joseph, before Ruvik separates them again.

Sebastian finds Leslie and guides him back to the hospital. At the top of the lighthouse, he sees his own body in a bathtub hooked to the STEM machine. Kidman arrives and attempts to convince Sebastian that Leslie has to die. Ruvik interrupts them, gets hold of Leslie, and absorbs him.

Sebastian battles a gigantic creature created from Ruvik's subconscious and defeats it, waking up in the bathtub. He pulls himself off the machine, removes Ruvik's brain from the STEM, and crushes it. He wakes up in the tub again with Kidman by his side, monitoring him. Kidman motions for Sebastian to stay quiet. Sebastian falls unconscious, and later wakes up in the same tub, with no one around except for the bodies of Jimenez and Connelly, whose deaths in STEM killed them in real life as well. As police and S.W.A.T. reinforcements arrive, Sebastian exits the hospital and notices Leslie walking out of the main gates.

=== The Assignment and The Consequence ===
Entering the machine, Kidman is attacked by Oscar Connelly (Kiff VandenHeuvel / Keiji Hirai) while in the forest and falls off a cliff. She hears Mobius talking to her and attempts to use a keypad. Blocked out by the keypad, she is forced to find a way to get access, avoiding several creatures along the way. After being trapped by Ruvik and subsequently rescued by Sebastian and Joseph, she is separated from the former, while the latter turns into a Haunted and attacks Kidman. After she defeats him, the world changes and after getting past several obstacles, she finds Leslie and takes him to the church, to be confronted by Ruvik who attacks Kidman through Leslie. She learns that Ruvik can leave STEM through Leslie by overriding himself into Leslie's body, and he informs Kidman that Mobius has been keeping tabs on her as much as he once was. Kidman tries to shoot Leslie, for both to disappear, and a figure known as the Administrator (Rob Brownstein / Jin Yamanoi) begins talking to Kidman, demanding her to extract Leslie instead of killing him regardless, but Kidman refuses to complete the mission, warning him that they do not know what Ruvik is capable of. He then appears in front of her as a dark misty figure and pursues her until Kidman manages to escape him. Outside the church, she sees Beacon Mental Hospital in the distance, before its lighthouse blinds her.

Waking up in the Safe Haven and meeting Tatiana Gutierrez (Julie Granata / Yūko Kaida), Kidman explores the area before being able to leave. Ending up back at the Mobius headquarters, she decides to go the bottom floor to the STEM terminal because she thinks Leslie is heading there. Along the way she learns more about Ruvik's relationship with Mobius and the way they treated him. Reaching at the terminal, she is led back to Krimson City and goes through the police department, where she sees memories of Sebastian and Joseph and begins feeling sympathy for the former. Heading back towards Beacon Mental Hospital, she meets up with Sebastian who gets turned into a Haunted by Ruvik but manages to save him and find Leslie. The Administrator chases her until she gets to a school bus and drives away, but Ruvik telepathically launches the bus into the hotel. Kidman recovers and is separated from Sebastian and Joseph, losing her handgun in the process. Along the way, she encounters paintings of Ruvik that are trying to take control of Leslie. Kidman manages to save Leslie, but he runs out of fear. Proceeding further, she finds more paintings trying to take control of Leslie. While trying to fend them off, hands of Laura burst from the ground and ensnare Kidman, and Leslie points a gun towards her, but he manages to resist Ruvik's control and shoots the painting, saving Kidman. Retrieving the handgun from Leslie, Kidman takes him along, hoping that this way he will be safe. Following this, a scene from the main game plays, but from Kidman's perspective, as she sees the Administrator instead of Sebastian, who informs that they know what Leslie will become and that Ruvik is a corpse. After Leslie's outburst, she pursues Leslie, but is brought back to Mobius HQ.

She goes through a door and is brought to Beacon, where she accesses other rooms and learns about Leslie's synchronization with Ruvik's brainwave due to his loss of family, and her being an expendable agent that could potentially neutralize Ruvik. Rushing through dozens of Haunted, Kidman is able to get in an elevator that leads up to the apex of Beacon where the Mobius facility is, as the Administrator taunts Kidman, explaining that STEM was built on the premise of fear as a way to control individuals, with the true purpose of her mission serving as a test run for the Administrator's new method of infused control. Having broken out of his influence, she faces the Administrator, who makes a final attempt to end Kidman but is defeated, who remarks how he will always be a part of Kidman before being shot.

Awakening in the real world, Kidman sees Leslie emerge from a STEM terminal and being taken away along with Joseph, as well as the vessel that housed Ruvik's brain now empty, much to her confusion. A woman then calls out to Kidman from behind, who is revealed as Myra (Tasia Valenza / Rica Fukami), Sebastian's wife. Myra says "he" will need a debriefing as soon as Kidman gets back. With no one watching her, Kidman frees Sebastian, and tells the Mobius members to leave Sebastian, Connelly, and Jimenez there, as they were not going anywhere. The Administrator's voice is heard and says that "No one is".

== Development and marketing ==
The Evil Within began development in late 2010 under the codename "Project Zwei". Resident Evil creator Shinji Mikami served as the game's director, with development taking place at his studio Tango Gameworks. The studio was bought by ZeniMax Media in 2010, shortly after development began. Initially, Mikami had no interest in making another survival horror game but after realizing there was a demand for one, he felt compelled to respond. The other reason was because he believed that contemporary horror games relied more on action than survival.

The game was announced in April 2013. Believing that the tropes of the survival horror had become predictable over time, the design deliberately attempts to make the player feel powerless by taking place in confined spaces, limiting ammunition, and presenting near-invincible enemies that promote running and hiding over engaging in combat. Art director Naoki Katakai said that the design concept of enemies, such as those wrapped in barbed wire or filled with glass shards, is that they are victims suffering under a greater evil. The asylum itself was inspired by the Winchester Mystery House, a Californian mansion famous for its architectural curiosities. The Evil Within is built on the id Tech 5 modified by Tango Gameworks with a new dynamic renderer enabling dynamic lighting to the game. Tessellation is also added. On April 15, 2013, and over the next few days, Bethesda Softworks revealed a series of short cryptic videos teasing the new game, officially announcing it on April 19, 2013, revealing the title, the platforms it will be released on, and a live-action teaser trailer. A second trailer was released on September 17, 2013 and an extended gameplay video was revealed on September 27, 2013. Bethesda announced that the game had gone gold on September 25, 2014.

== Release ==
The Evil Within was released for PlayStation 3, PlayStation 4, Windows, Xbox 360, and Xbox One in October 2014. In Japan, the game was released as Psycho Break. The Japanese version had to remove gore-related content to receive a D-content rating (allowing its sale to customers 17 years of age or older) to avoid limiting its potential audience; this content can be restored via optional DLC.

Warner Bros. Movie World in Queensland, Australia, created a maze populated with real-life characters from the game as part of its annual Fright Nights event to promote the game. Prior to the game's release, Titan Comics released a four-part miniseries set before the events of the main game The Art of the Evil Within, a book collecting concept art and behind-the-scenes material from the game, was released by Dark Horse Comics alongside the game on October 14, 2014.

The game also features downloadable content (DLC) missions which feature Juli Kidman and the enemy, the Keeper, as playable characters. A story-based campaign following Kidman was released as two separate DLC packs, which introduced new enemies, locations, and focus on unsolved mysteries from the main game. The first of the two DLCs, titled The Assignment was released on all platforms in March 2015 worldwide, while The Consequence followed later in April 2015. The final DLC content, The Executioner, follows the character called The Keeper through a series of mission-based levels with sadistic objectives. The content allows players to play in a first-person perspective and was released on May 25, 2015.

== Reception ==
=== Critical reception ===
Reception

Aggregate score
Aggregator	Score
Metacritic	PC: 68/100; PS4: 75/100; XONE: 79/100

Review scores
Publication	Score
Computer and Video Games	8/10
Destructoid	7/10
Eurogamer	8/10
Famitsu	35/40
Game Informer	9/10
GameSpot	7/10
GamesRadar+	3.5/5
GameTrailers	9/10
Giant Bomb	2/5
Hardcore Gamer	4/5
IGN	8.7/10
Joystiq	2.5/5
Official Xbox Magazine (US)	8/10
PC Gamer (US)	60/100
Polygon	6.5/10
VideoGamer.com	8/10

The Evil Within received "generally favorable" reviews from critics for the Xbox One and PS4 versions, while the PC version received "mixed or average" reviews, according to review aggregator website Metacritic.

Computer and Video Games (CVG) described it as "the game Resident Evil 5 should have been", although they were critical of some technical issues. VideoGamer.com liked the gunplay and horror, but disliked the story and its pacing, stating: "The Evil Within has enough magic to make it a worthy investment." Destructoid said: "[The game] will definitely scratch the itch of someone who has been pining for a return to the older days of gaming, but everyone else who has come to expect that certain layer of polish likely won't be amused." Polygon's Philip Kollar summed up his thoughts by saying: "The Evil Within has great moments where the excellent combat and creepy environmental design come together. But those moments are fleeting, inevitably sapped of their delightful terror by design choices that feel trapped in the glory days of a decade ago."

GamesRadar's Ashley Reed gave the game a 3.5/5, commending the game for providing innovation and a story that keeps the player involved. Even though she mostly liked the game, Reed had several criticisms, stating: "The Evil Within stumbles in a few too many places to be Mikami's magnum opus. It artificially forces players into punishing combat scenarios more times than can be ignored, and plots and themes with great promise end up sputtering out in disheartening fashion. Still, it would be wrong to dismiss all the things it does right. Between a gorefest that's thoroughly engrossing, amazing feelings of triumph created by the imposing difficulty, and a plot that gets to the core of some very unsettling themes, The Evil Within brings enough to the table that it deserves a taste."

Lucy O'Brien of IGN gave it a positive score of 8.7 out of 10 in her review of the game. She praised the gameplay and horror of the game, but criticized the boring protagonist, Sebastian, and the saggy and convoluted plot, stating that "while its story does end up buckling under its own ambition, there is little here that takes away from the joy of experiencing survival horror under the steady hands of a master of the craft."

Christopher Livingston from PC Gamer gave it a mixed review, praising the survival portions of the game, tense and often exciting atmosphere, satisfying stealth, exciting action sequences, as well as the nicely detailed environment, but criticizing the recycled, and very often, not scary bosses, poor character models, late texture pop-ins, sluggish control, frustrating camera angles, limited video options and poor decision on the aspect ratio. He stated that all these technical issues have dragged The Evil Within from enjoyably challenging to needlessly frustrating.

Tim Turi from Game Informer praised its high replay value, jump scares, well-executed lighting, dark, unpredictable world, as well as the sounds of enemies, but criticizing the distracting texture pop-in and disappointing story. He summarized the game as "an unnerving experience that keep your palms sweaty while delivering a harrowingly rewarding gameplay trial."

Shaun McInnis of GameSpot spoke well of its striking atmosphere, tense combat that encourages resourcefulness, and rewarding skill progression system, but criticizing the nonsensical story and forgettable characters, autosave system, and a few frustrating boss fights.

As the aspect ratio of the game received criticism, a patch was released on June 23, 2015, that allows players to play the game in full screen.

=== Sales ===
In Japan, The Evil Within sold 176,691 physical units across all platforms, along with an estimated 4,138 digital units.

In the United Kingdom, the game was the second best-selling game on the all-formats chart during its week of release.

In the United States, it was the third best-selling game of October 2014. It set the record for the highest-selling first month of sales for a new survival horror intellectual property, until the record was later broken by Dying Light, when it was released in January 2015.

== Sequel ==
At E3 2017, Bethesda revealed The Evil Within 2. The game takes place three years after the events of the original game and features Sebastian returning to STEM to look for Lily, his believed-to-be dead daughter. It was released on PlayStation 4, Windows, and Xbox One on October 13, 2017.
