= No More Heroes =

No More Heroes may refer to:

== Music ==
- No More Heroes (album), a 1977 album by The Stranglers
  - "No More Heroes" (song), the title track
- "No More Heroes", a song by Westlife from the album Where We Are

== Video games ==
- No More Heroes (series), the video game series
  - No More Heroes (video game), a 2007 video game for the Wii
    - No More Heroes: Heroes' Paradise, a 2010 version of the game, for Xbox 360 and PlayStation 3
  - Its 2010 sequel, No More Heroes 2: Desperate Struggle
  - The 2019 game, Travis Strikes Again: No More Heroes
  - The 2021 sequel, No More Heroes III
