= Kris Zimmerman =

American actress

Kris Zimmerman Salter
- Occupations: Voice director, casting director
- Years active: 1986–present
- Spouses: Patric Zimmerman (m. 1985; div. 1993) Carlton Salter (died 2011)

Kris Zimmerman Salter is an American voice and casting director in the animation and video game industry. Her major works in video games include the Metal Gear Solid series. In animation, she was the voice director for Dexter's Laboratory, Cow and Chicken, The Grim Adventures of Billy and Mandy, Ben 10, The Real Adventures of Jonny Quest, Regular Show and Fish Hooks.

== Biography ==
A theatre major, she started working at Hanna–Barbera as a talent coordinator for Wildfire in 1986.

She has also directed and cast the voices for a number of games, including Onimusha 3: Demon Siege, Legacy of Kain: Soul Reaver, Grandia II, La Pucelle, Sword of the Berserk: Guts' Rage and No More Heroes. In addition, she also directed and/or cast the voices for various TV animated series, such as Johnny Bravo, Cow and Chicken, The Real Adventures of Jonny Quest, The Grim Adventures of Billy & Mandy, and its spin-offs Evil Con Carne and Underfist: Halloween Bash, SWAT Kats: The Radical Squadron, Ben 10 and The Jetsons (for which she was a talent coordinator). She was also the casting director and recording director for Regular Show.

She was married to voice actor Patric Zimmerman (the voice of Revolver Ocelot) for eight years, until 1993. They continue to work together.

== Filmography ==
=== Animation roles ===
- The New Adventures of Captain Planet – Additional Voices
- Droopy, Master Detective – Additional Voices

=== Video game roles ===
- Killer7 – Punk Kid C
- Marvel: Ultimate Alliance – Additional Voices
- Metal Gear Solid 4: Guns of the Patriots – Body of Armor (Satisfied Customers), Enemy Soldiers, Warning Voice of Gekko
- Professor Layton and the Last Specter – Additional Voices
- Resident Evil 6 – Civilians
- Resident Evil: Revelations 2 – Gina Foley, Newscaster
- Shadows of the Damned – Demons
- Soldier of Fortune II: Double Helix – Additional Voices
- Star Trek: Starfleet Command III – Additional Voices
- Star Trek: Voyager – Elite Force – Crewman, Imperial Officer
- The Wonderful 101 – Wonder-Black
- Travis Strikes Again: No More Heroes – Jeane
- X-Men Legends – Female Civilian

=== Documentary roles ===
- I Know That Voice – Herself

== Production filmography ==
- A Pup Named Scooby-Doo – Talent Coordinator (Season 1), Casting Director (Season 2-4)
- Adventures from the Book of Virtues – Casting Director (Seasons 1-2)
- The Addams Family – Casting Director (Season 2)
- Ape Escape Academy – Voice Director
- Ape Escape: On the Loose – Voice Director
- Arc the Lad: Twilight of the Spirits – Voice Director
- Area 51 – Voice Director
- Bayonetta – Voice Director
- Bayonetta 2 – Voice Director
- Bayonetta 3 - Voice and Casting Director
- Ben 10 – Casting and Voice Director
- Bill & Ted's Excellent Adventures – Casting Director (Season 1)
- Billy & Mandy's Big Boogey Adventure – Casting Director and Recording Director
- Bionic Commando – Voice Director
- Bionicle: Mask of Light – Voice Director
- Blazing Dragons - VO Direction and Casting with Gordon Hunt
- Bruno the Kid – Voice Director
- Capitol Critters – Casting Director
- Casper's Haunted Christmas – Voice Director
- Cave Kids – Voice Director
- Close Enough – Casting Director & Recording Director
- Code Name: S.T.E.A.M. – Voice Director
- The Completely Mental Misadventures of Ed Grimley – Talent Coordinator
- Cow and Chicken – Casting Director and Recording Director
- The Cramp Twins – Casting director (Season 1) and Voice Director
- Curious George – Casting Director (seasons 5-6; 10-15) (71 episodes) & Voice Director (seasons 5-6; 10-15) (100 episodes)
- Dark Cloud 2 – Voice Director
- Dead Rising – Voice Director
- Dinotrux – Voice Director
- Droopy, Master Detective – Casting Director
- Dumb and Dumber – Casting Director and Recording Director (Season 1)
- Eternal Darkness: Sanity's Requiem – Voice Director
- Evil Con Carne – Casting Director & Recording Director
- Fantastic Max – Talent Coordinator (Season 1), Casting Director (Season 2)
- Fire Emblem Fates – Voice Director
- Fish Hooks – Dialogue Director
- Final Fight: Streetwise – Voice Director
- The Flintstone Kids – Talent Coordinator
- Foofur – Talent Coordinator
- G.I. Joe: Resolute – Voice Director
- God of War II – Voice Director
- God of War III – Voice Director
- God of War: Ascension – Voice Director
- God of War: Ghost of Sparta – Voice Director
- Grandia II – Voice Director
- Gravedale High – Casting Director
- The Grim Adventures of Billy & Mandy – Casting Director and Recording Director
- Happy Halloween, Scooby-Doo! – Casting Director & Voice Director
- Heretic II - Voice Director
- I Am Weasel – Voice Director
- Infinity Train – Voice Director
- Injustice: Gods Among Us – Voice Director
- The Jetsons (1987) – Talent Coordinator (Season 3)
- Killer7 – Voice Director
- La Pucelle: Tactics – Voice Director
- Lair – Voice Director
- Legacy of Kain: Blood Omen 2 – Voice Director
- Legacy of Kain: Defiance – Voice Director
- Legacy of Kain: Soul Reaver – Voice Director
- Legacy of Kain: Soul Reaver 2 – Voice Director
- Lost Planet: Extreme Condition – Voice Director
- Mad Max – Voice Director
- Marvel: Ultimate Alliance – Voice Director
- Marvel's Spider-Man – Voice Director
- Marvel's Spider-Man: Miles Morales – Voice Director
- Marvel's Spider-Man 2 - Voice Director
- Metal Gear Acid 2 – Voice Director
- Metal Gear Online – Voice Director
- Metal Gear Rising: Revengeance – Voice Director
- Metal Gear Solid 3: Snake Eater – Voice Director
- Metal Gear Solid 4: Guns of the Patriots – Voice Director
- Metal Gear Solid V: Ground Zeroes – Voice Director
- Metal Gear Solid V: The Phantom Pain – Voice Director
- Metal Gear Solid: Integral – Voice Director
- Metal Gear Solid: Peace Walker – Voice Director
- Metal Gear Solid: Portable Ops – Voice Director
- Metal Gear Solid: The Twin Snakes – Voice Director
- Midnight Patrol: Adventures in the Dream Zone – Casting Director
- Mortal Kombat: Defenders of the Realm – Voice Director
- The New Adventures of Captain Planet – Casting Director and Recording Director (Seasons 4-6)
- The New Yogi Bear Show – Talent Coordinator
- No More Heroes – Voice Director
- No More Heroes 2: Desperate Struggle – Voice Director
- No More Heroes III – Voice Director
- Onimusha 3: Demon Siege – Voice Director
- P.N.03 – Voice Director
- Pac-Man and the Ghostly Adventures – Voice Directors
- Paddington Bear – Casting Director
- The Pirates of Dark Water – Casting Director
- Popeye and Son – Talent Coordinator
- Pound Puppies – Talent Coordinator
- Ratchet & Clank: Rift Apart - Voice Director
- The Real Adventures of Jonny Quest – Casting Director and Recording Director
- Regular Show – Casting Director & Recording Director
- Regular Show: The Movie – Casting Director & Recording Director
- Resident Evil: Revelations 2 – Voice Director
- Return to Castle Wolfenstein – Voice Director
- Revenant – Casting and Voice Director
- Rockin' with Judy Jetson – Talent Coordinator
- Rugrats – Voice Director
- Scooby-Doo and the Alien Invaders – Voice Director
- Scooby-Doo! and the Witch's Ghost – Voice Director
- Scooby-Doo on Zombie Island – Voice Director
- Secret Mountain Fort Awesome – Casting and Voice Director
- Shadows of the Damned – Casting and Voice Director
- The Smurfs (1986-1989) – Talent Coordinator (Seasons 6-8) & Casting Director (season 9)
- SOCOM U.S. Navy SEALs: Fireteam Bravo 2 – Voice Director
- Soldier of Fortune II: Double Helix – Voice Director
- Sonic Boom – Casting Director
- Spider-Man – Voice Director (season one)
- Star Trek: Armada II – Voice Director
- Star Trek: Elite Force II – Voice Director
- Star Trek: Voyager – Elite Force – Voice Director
- Star Wars Jedi Knight: Jedi Academy – Voice Director
- SWAT Kats: The Radical Squadron – Casting Director and Recording Director
- Syphon Filter: The Omega Strain – Voice Director
- Tenchu 2: Birth of the Stealth Assassins – Voice Director
- Tenchu: Wrath of Heaven – Voice Director
- Tom & Jerry Kids – Casting Director
- Tomb Raider: Anniversary – Voice Director
- Tomb Raider: Legend – Voice Director
- Tomb Raider: Underworld – Voice Director
- Travis Strikes Again: No More Heroes – Voice Director
- Uncharted: Golden Abyss – Voice Director
- Underfist: Halloween Bash – Casting Director and Recording Director
- Vanquish – Casting and Voice Director
- Wildfire – Talent Coordinator
- The Wonderful 101 – Voice Director
- X-Men Legends – Voice Director
- X-Men Legends II: Rise of Apocalypse – Voice Director
- Yo Yogi! – Casting Director
- Yogi the Easter Bear – Casting Director and Recording Director
- Yogi's Treasure Hunt – Talent Coordinator (Season 3)
