= Kimberly Brooks =

American voice actress

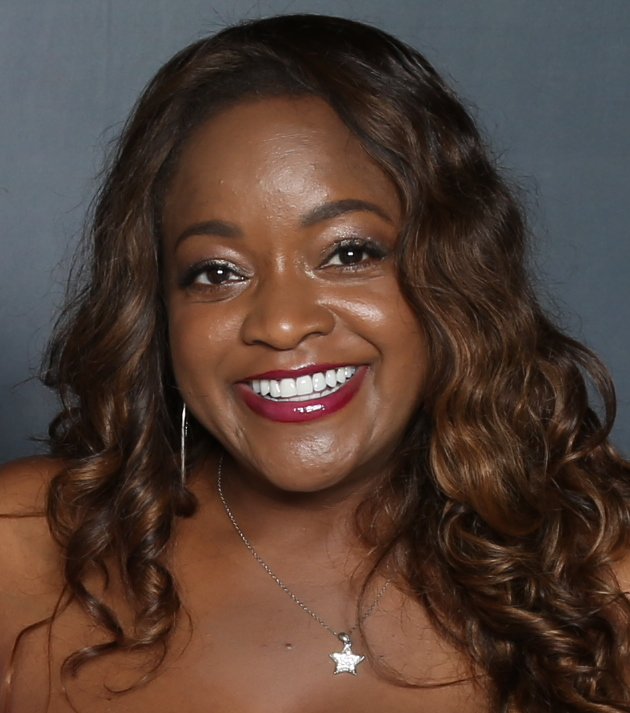
- Brooks at the 2018 Florida Supercon
- Other name: Kimberly D. Brooks
- Occupation: Voice actress
- Years active: 1996–present

Kimberly Brooks is an American voice actress. Brooks has voiced characters in video games since the mid-1990s. She has played the voice of Luna in the Scooby-Doo franchise as part of The Hex Girls, Ashley Williams in the Mass Effect series, Stormy in the Nickelodeon revival of Winx Club, Buena Girl from ¡Mucha Lucha!, Barbara Gordon in the Batman: Arkham video game series, Shinobu Jacobs in No More Heroes and No More Heroes 2: Desperate Struggle, Princess Allura from Voltron: Legendary Defender, Mee Mee in Dexter's Laboratory, Jasper in Steven Universe, Robin Ayou in Subnautica: Below Zero, and various roles in South Park (including Nichole Daniels, Classi, and Margaret Nelson). Brooks won a BAFTA Award for Performer in a Supporting Role at the 18th British Academy Games Awards for her work in Psychonauts 2.

== Filmography ==
=== Film ===
Year	Title	Role	Notes
1999	Scooby-Doo! and the Witch's Ghost	Luna	Direct-to-video
2001	Jimmy Neutron: Boy Genius	Courtney Tyler, Zachary Jones, Angie Jenson	
2002	The Wild Thornberrys Movie	Tally	
2003	Scooby-Doo! and the Legend of the Vampire	Luna	Direct-to-video
2003	Batman: Mystery of the Batwoman	Kathy Duquesne	Direct-to-video
2004	¡Mucha Lucha!: The Return of El Maléfico	Buena Girl, Snow Pea	Direct-to-video
2005	Rugrats Tales from the Crib: Snow White	Forest Animals, Kittens	Television film
2006	Curious George	Additional voices	
2007	Superman: Doomsday	Murphy	Direct-to-video
2014	Justice League: War	Darla	Direct-to-video
2019	Birds of a Feather	Seagull Neighbor	
2019	Wonder Woman: Bloodlines	Cheetah, Giganta	Direct-to-video
2019	Spies in Disguise	Lance's Car	
2020	DC Showcase: Adam Strange	Diane, Meyra, Alanna	Short film
2020	Batman: Death in the Family	Police Officer, Reporter	Short film
2021	Space Jam: A New Legacy	Additional voices	
2021	South Park: Post Covid	Interviewer, Additional voices	Exclusive
2021	South Park: Post Covid: The Return of Covid	Margret Nelson, Laura Tucker, additional voices	Exclusive
2021	Curious George: Cape Ahoy	Gwen	
2022	Turning Red	Additional voices	
2022	Teen Titans Go! & DC Super Hero Girls: Mayhem in the Multiverse	Bumblebee	Direct-to-video
2022	South Park: The Streaming Wars	Linda Black, additional voices	Exclusive
2022	South Park: The Streaming Wars Part 2	Linda Black, additional voices	Exclusive
2022	Diary of a Wimpy Kid: Rodrick Rules	News Anchor	Direct-to-streaming
2023	South Park: Joining the Panderverse	Kathleen Kennedy, additional voices	Exclusive
2023	South Park (Not Suitable for Children)	Janice Donavan, additional voices	Exclusive
2024	South Park: The End of Obesity	Linda Black, Laura Tucker, additional voices	Exclusive
2024	Big City Greens the Movie: Spacecation	Additional voices	Television film
2024	The Day the Earth Blew Up: A Looney Tunes Movie	Spaceship Computer, coffee shop customer	

=== Television ===
Year	Title	Role	Notes
1996–1998	Dexter's Laboratory	Mee Mee	4 episodes
1999–2000	The Powerpuff Girls	Joey, Sister, Mom #1, Little Brother	2 episodes
2001	As Told by Ginger	Chantel, Cheerleader #1, Cheerleader #2	2 episodes
2001	Jason and the Heroes of Mount Olympus	Additional voices	
2001	Rugrats	Young Lucy Carmichael	Episode: "A Rugrats Kwanzaa"
2001–2004	Static Shock	Puff, Madelyn Spaulding	7 episodes
2002	Totally Spies!	Queen Tassara, Princess Makeda	
2002	Whatever Happened to... Robot Jones?	Mrs. Kavendish	1 episode
2002–2003	What's New, Scooby-Doo?	Janet Lawrence, Elliott Binder, Phylidia Flanders, Backup Singer #2, Luna	4 episodes
2002–2004	¡Mucha Lucha!	Buena Girl, Snow Pea	Main role
2003	Ozzy & Drix	Christine Kolchuck	Episode: "An Out of Body Experience"
2003	Justice League	Mrs. Saunders	Episode: "Comfort and Joy"
2005	Teen Titans	Sarasim	Episode: "Cyborg the Barbarian"
2005	The Fairly OddParents	Walla	Episode: "Love at First Height"
2005	Rugrats Pre-School Daze	Noah	
2005	Danger Rangers	Boy and Girl 2	
2005–2006	Danny Phantom	Angela Foley	4 episodes
2005–2007	All Grown Up!	Doctor, Boy, McT, Sammy	
2006	Hi Hi Puffy AmiYumi	Jill	
2006–2007	Shuriken School	Jimmy B, Nobunaga, Bruce Chang	
2007	Chowder	Chutney	Episode: "Majhongg Night"
2007	Random! Cartoons	Super John Doe, Jr.	Episode: "Super John Doe Junior"
2007–2017	The Big Bang Theory	Automated Cell Phone Voice, Eye Scanner Voice	
2008–present	South Park	Nichole Daniels, Classi, Heather Conduct, Laura Tucker (2014–present), Michelle Obama, Wendy Williams, Margret Nelson, Linda Black (2022–present), additional voices	
2010	Special Agent Oso	Andrew's Mom, Caroline's Mom	
2010	Phineas and Ferb	Additional voices	
2010–2013	Scooby-Doo! Mystery Incorporated	Luna, Cassidy Williams, Woman	
2011–2015	Winx Club	Stormy, various voices	Nickelodeon version
2012	Gravity Falls	Sassica, additional voices	
2012	Motorcity	Mrs. Gordy	Episode: "Reunion"
2012–2014	Ben 10: Omniverse	Princess Looma Red Wind, Serena, Rook Bralla, Rayona, Starbeard	
2012–2016	Doc McStuffins	Doctor Maisha McStuffins	
2013	Gravity Falls Shorts	Sassica	
2013	Ultimate Spider-Man	Amanda Cage, Woman	2 episodes
2014	Two and a Half Men	Computer Voice	
2014	The Boondocks	Brownee Point	
2015	I Didn't Do It	GPS	
2015	Vixen	Young Mari	
2015–2016	Pickle and Peanut	Additional voices	
2015–2017	Be Cool, Scooby-Doo!	Mallory O'Neill, Estelle Brady, Mrs. Warwik	
2015–2017	Steven Universe	Jasper, Malachite, Carnelian, Skinny Jasper	9 episodes
2015–2019	The Stinky & Dirty Show	Jumpy, Carla, Dottie, Miss Bee, Voice	
2016	Sanjay and Craig	Kelley, Headband Guy, Bertha Van Weld, Mother	
2016	Pure Genius	Sheila Evans	Episode: "Pilot"
2016	Man with a Plan	Nav System	Episode: "Adam Steps Up"
2016–2018	Voltron: Legendary Defender	Princess Allura	Main role
2016–2019	Shimmer and Shine	Various voices	
2017	Danger & Eggs	Kimmy, Plant Worker, Crowd Person, Lawyer Phillip, Phillipcon Staffer, Booth Kid	
2017	DC Super Hero Girls	Lightning, Mari McCabe	
2017	Legends of Chamberlain Heights	Voice	
2017	Sofia the First	Mrs. Candoo	Episode: "Princess Jade"
2017–2019	Adam Ruins Everything	Tanya, Gail, VO Skull, VO Lizzie Maggie	
2017–2019	If You Give a Mouse a Cookie	Daisy's Mom	
2018	Avengers Assemble	Shuri	Episode: "The Eye of Agamotto"
2018	Family Guy	Black Sitcom Mom	Episode: "Stand by Meg"
2018–2021	DuckTales	Peg Leg Meg, Hardtack Hattie, One-Eyed Linda, Young Female Pig, Female Customers	3 episodes
2019	Pinky Malinky	Carl, Sophie	Episode: "Advanced"
2019	Fast & Furious Spy Racers	Wanda Benson	
2019	The Epic Tales of Captain Underpants	Additional Voices	Seasons 2–3
2019–2020	Steven Universe Future	Jasper, Cherry Quartz, Superfan Rose, Shy Rose, Hippie Rose, Angel Aura Quartz, Zebra Jasper, Ocean Jasper, Flint	
2019–2021	DC Super Hero Girls	Karen Beecher / Bumblebee	
2020	Cleopatra in Space	Amsaja	Episode: "Pirates"
2020	Animaniacs	Sojourner Truth, Audience Member, Defensive Fan	3 episodes
2020	Lego Monkie Kid	Spider Queen, Cloud Guardian	Season 1
2020–2021	Teen Titans Go!	Karen Beecher / Bumblebee (DC Super Hero Girls)	4 episodes
2020–2022	It's Pony	Mrs. Bornstein, Health Inspector	2 episodes
2020–2023	The Owl House	Skara	9 episodes
2021	DreamWorks Dragons: The Nine Realms	Wendy	Episode: "Featherhide"
2021	Aquaman: King of Atlantis	Hammer	2 episodes
2021–2024	Arcane	Sky Young / Margot	4 episodes
2021–2022	He-Man and the Masters of the Universe	Teela, Eldress, Katura	Main role
2021–2023	Harriet the Spy	Janie Gibbs	5 episodes
2021–2025	Baby Shark's Big Show!	Vola	
2021–present	The Loud House	Cricket Van Doren, additional voices	
2021–present	The Simpsons	Janey Powell, Lewis Clark	Season 32–present
2022	Robot Chicken	Old Lady, Moon Shoes Mother, Evil Queen	Episode: "May Cause Bubbles Where You Don't Want 'Em"
2022	Big Nate	Donna	Episode: "The Pimple"
2022	Star Trek: Prodigy	Commander Kaseth, Additional voices	2 episodes
2022	The Cuphead Show!	Elephant Grandma	3 episodes
2022	The Boys Presents: Diabolical	Jess Bradley (PR Type)	Episode: "I'm Your Pusher"
2022	Spirit Rangers	Mindy	Episode: "Woe Is Wolf"
2022	Dragon Age: Absolution	Miriam	Main role
2022–2023	Oddballs	Echo, Baby Judge, Nice Old Woman, Customer	
2022–present	Batwheels	Batcomputer, additional voices	
2023	Velma	Cool Edgy Girl	Episode: "The Candy (Wo)man"
2023	Hailey's On It!	Judge, Tia	2 episodes
2023–2024	The Ghost and Molly McGee	Adia	3 episodes
2024	Rock Paper Scissors	President	
2024–present	Batman: Caped Crusader	Romona, Romy Chandler, additional voices	
2025–present	The Bad Guys: The Series	Ash, Thalia	3 episodes

=== Video games ===
Year	Title	Role	Notes
1997	Goosebumps: Attack of the Mutant	Dinah	
1997	Dark Reign: The Future of War	Computer	
1998	Ace Ventura Pet Detective: The Case of the Serial Shaver	Erica Cooper, Waitress	
1998	Dark Reign: Rise of the Shadowhand	Computer	
1998	Barbie Riding Club	Christie	
1999	D2	Kimberly Fox	
2000	Dark Reign 2	Sindi	
2001	Star Wars: Galactic Battlegrounds	Naboo Scout Captain, Y-Wing Pilot	
2001	Maximo: Ghosts to Glory	Lenore, Mamba Marie, Sephonie	
2003	Star Wars: Knights of the Old Republic	Hester, Elise Montagne, Sharina Fizark, Additional Voices	
2003	Batman: Rise of Sin Tzu	Additional voices	
2004	Shark Tale	Additional Tenant Fish	
2004	EverQuest II	Generic Female Half Elf Merchant, Generic Female Froglok Merchant, Generic Female Dark Elf Merchant, Generic Female High Elf Merchant, Generic Female Iksar, Generic Female Kerran Merchant, Generic Female Ogre	
2005	The Matrix: Path of Neo	Niobe, Civilians	
2006	Dead Rising	Additional voices	
2006	Bullet Witch	Additional voices	
2007	Spider-Man 3	Additional voices	
2007	Clive Barker's Jericho	Agent Muriel Green	
2007	Supreme Commander: Forged Alliance	Officer Commander Celene	
2007	Mass Effect	Ashley Williams	
2007	No More Heroes	Shinobu Jacobs	
2008	Metal Gear Solid 4: Guns of the Patriots	FROGS	
2008	Spider-Man: Web of Shadows	Miscellaneous	
2008	Tom Clancy's EndWar	Unnamed Newsreader	
2009	Stormrise	Hunter Pilot	
2009	inFAMOUS	Female Pedestrian	
2009	Batman: Arkham Asylum	Barbara Gordon/Oracle, Sarah Cassidy	
2009	Marvel: Ultimate Alliance 2	Firestar, Psylocke	
2009	Dragon Age: Origins	Lanaya, additional voices	
2009	James Cameron's Avatar: The Game	Kendra Midori, Na'vi, RDA	
2010	No More Heroes 2: Desperate Struggle	Shinobu Jacobs	
2010	Mass Effect 2	Ashley Williams	
2010	Supreme Commander 2		
2010	Dead to Rights: Retribution	Faith	
2010	Lost Planet²	Additional voices	
2011	Batman: Arkham City	Barbara Gordon/Oracle, M.P.T. Officer Anne Bishop	
2011	Saints Row: The Third	Additional voices	
2012	Mass Effect 3	Ashley Williams	
2012	Lollipop Chainsaw	Rosalind	
2012	Guild Wars 2	Boticca, additional voices	
2012	XCOM: Enemy Unknown	Female Soldier	
2012	Dishonored	Dead Eel Thug, Hatter Thug	The Brigmore Witches DLC
2012	Halo 4	Dr. Lani Truman	
2013	Aliens: Colonial Marines	Jennifer Redding	
2013	BioShock Infinite	Daisy Fitzroy	
2013	Injustice: Gods Among Us	Batgirl	
2013	Marvel Heroes	Rachel Cole Alves	
2013	Infinity Blade III	Shell the Merchant	
2013	The Legend of Heroes: Trails of Cold Steel	Angelica Rogner	
2013	Call of Duty: Ghosts	Additional voices	
2013	Lightning Returns: Final Fantasy XIII	Woman in Love	
2014	Hearthstone: Heroes of WarCraft	Spiteful Summoner	
2014	inFAMOUS Second Son	Concrete Cannon	
2014	Smite		
2014	BioShock Infinite: Burial at Sea	Daisy Fitzroy	
2014	The Legend of Heroes: Trails of Cold Steel II	Angelica Rogner	
2014	Skylanders: Trap Team	Echo, Bad Juju, Eye-Scream	
2014	Lego Batman 3: Beyond Gotham	Batgirl, Fierce Flame	
2015	Code Name: S.T.E.A.M.	Califia	
2015	Skylanders: SuperChargers	Echo	
2015	Anki Overdrive	Announcer	
2015	Halo 5: Guardians	Additional voices	
2015	Call of Duty: Black Ops III	Additional voices	
2015	Fallout 4	Female Brotherhood of Steel	
2016	Anki Overdrive: Supertrucks	A5H	
2016	Skylanders: Imaginators	Echo, Bad Juju	
2017	Minecraft: Story Mode	Binta	Season 2
2017	LawBreakers	Announcer (H.A.N.N.A.H.)	
2017	DreamWorks Voltron VR Chronicles	Allura	
2017	South Park: Phone Destroyer	Nichole Daniels, Classi	
2017	South Park: The Fractured but Whole	Nichole Daniels, Classi, Laura Tucker, additional voices	
2018	Where the Water Tastes Like Wine	Althea	
2018	Far Cry 5	Additional voices	
2018	Marvel Powers United VR	Storm	
2018	World of Warcraft: Battle for Azeroth		
2019	Travis Strikes Again: No More Heroes	Shinobu Jacobs	
2019	Far Cry New Dawn		
2019	Final Fantasy XV: Episode Ardyn	Additional voices	
2020	Legends of Runeterra	Senna	
2020	Ninjala	Emma	
2020	The Legend of Heroes: Trails of Cold Steel IV	Angelica Rogner	
2021	Subnautica: Below Zero	Robin Ayou	
2021	DC Super Hero Girls: Teen Power	Bumblebee / Karen Beecher	
2021	Ratchet & Clank: Rift Apart	Emperor's Assistant, Nefarious Troopers	
2021	No More Heroes III	Shinobu Jacobs	
2021	Psychonauts 2	Hollis Forsythe, HQ Admin Susan, Bread	
2021	Cookie Run: Kingdom	Chili Pepper Cookie	
2022	Evil Dead: The Game	Amanda Fisher	
2022	We Are OFK	Mae Johns	
2023	Stray Gods: The Roleplaying Musical	Oracle	
2023	The Legend of Heroes: Trails into Reverie	Angelica Rogner, Portia	
2023	Destiny 2: Lightfall	Xivu Arath	
2024	South Park: Snow Day!	Nichole Daniels, additional voices	
2024	MultiVersus	Nubia	
2025	Borderlands 4	Harlowe The Gravitar	
2026	God of War Sons of Sparta	Oracle	
