= Romeo Is a Dead Man =

2026 video game

Romeo Is A Dead Man
- Developer: Grasshopper Manufacture
- Publisher: Grasshopper Manufacture
- Directors: Ren Yamazaki; Goichi Suda
- Producer: Goichi Suda
- Designers: Yosuke Akiyama; Daisuke Koyama
- Programmer: Toru Hironaka
- Artist: Kunihiko Taniwaki
- Writers: Goichi Suda; Ren Yamazaki
- Composers: Nobuaki Kaneko; Luby Sparks; Cody Carpenter
- Engine: Unreal Engine 5
- Platforms: PlayStation 5; Windows; Xbox Series X/S
- Release: February 11, 2026
- Genre: Action-adventure
- Mode: Single-player

Romeo Is a Dead Man is a 2026 action-adventure game developed and published by Grasshopper Manufacture released on February 11, 2026, for PlayStation 5, Windows, and Xbox Series X/S.

== Overview ==
Goichi Suda described the game as an "ultra-violent science fiction" action game in which you play as Romeo Stargazer, an FBI investigator who tracks down wanted criminals across spacetime using his modified half-dead body.

== Development ==
Suda first discussed Romeo Is a Dead Man in early 2021 as the studio's next project after No More Heroes III, likening it to the film The Adventures of Buckaroo Banzai Across the 8th Dimension. While various concept art and assets appeared in Famitsu and on Grasshopper Manufacturer's own social media accounts, a playable build was first teased at the end of the Grasshopper Direct in 2023, showing off various UI elements and an obscured view of the protagonist. The game was formally announced in June 2025. In an interview, Suda listed main inspirations for the game as 28 Days Later, Night of the Living Dead, and Back to the Future. He also stated that the main character's design came from a cancelled project titled Zombie Rider.

In an interview with Eurogamer, Suda ensured the game featured no AI development tools. In December 2025, Grasshopper Manufacture announced the release date and disclosed publishing details. Despite being owned by NetEase (who published the 2024 remaster of Shadows of the Damned), Grasshopper entered negotiations with multiple publishers before settling on doing it themselves, taking on more responsibility than they previously had for Travis Strikes Again which saw support from Nintendo.

Suda commented on the game's design and the studio's philosophy in a February 2026 interview with the official PlayStation blog. He compared game development to cooking ingredients and stated the studio uses "all sorts of ingredients that you normally wouldn't find in a regular kitchen", but they use said ingredients to their fullest ability.

A port for Nintendo Switch 2 is currently being developed.

== Reception ==
Reception

Aggregate scores
Aggregator	Score
Metacritic	(PC) 74/100 (PS5) 72/100 (XSXS) 78/100
OpenCritic	66% recommend (Note: Based on 125 reviews)

Review scores
Publication	Score
Game Informer	8.25/10
GameSpot	5/10
GamesRadar+	4/5
IGN	7/10
Push Square	6/10
Shacknews	6/10
TechRadar	4/5
The Guardian	2/5
Video Games Chronicle	4/5
VG247	4/5
VideoGamer.com	7/10

Romeo Is a Dead Man received reviews "mixed or average" for the Windows and PlayStation 5 versions while the Xbox Series X/S version received "generally favorable" reviews, according to review aggregator website Metacritic. OpenCritic determined that 66% of critics recommended the game.
