= No More Heroes: Heroes' Paradise =

2010 video game

- European cover art
- Developers: feelplus; AQ Interactive (Red Zone Edition)
- Publishers: JP: Marvelous Entertainment; NA/EU: Konami
- Series: No More Heroes
- Platforms: PlayStation 3, Xbox 360
- Release: PlayStation 3: JP: April 15, 2010; EU: May 20, 2011; JP: July 21, 2011 (Red Zone Edition); NA: August 16, 2011; Xbox 360: JP: April 15, 2010
- Genres: Action-adventure, hack and slash
- Mode: Single-player

No More Heroes: Heroes' Paradise (Note: Japanese: ノーモア★ヒーローズ 英雄たちの楽園, Hepburn: Nō Moa Hīrōzu Eiyūtachi no Rakuen) is a 2010 action-adventure game developed by feelplus. The game is an enhanced port of the 2007 Wii video game No More Heroes, originally developed by Grasshopper Manufacture and directed by Goichi Suda.

The game was released on PlayStation 3 and Xbox 360 in Japan on April 15, 2010, by Marvelous Entertainment. In North America and Europe, it was published by Konami in 2011 for the PlayStation 3, featuring support for the PlayStation Move, and various fixes to the game's performance and graphics. This version of the game was released in Japan as No More Heroes: Red Zone Edition (Note: Japanese: ノーモア★ヒーローズ レッドゾーン・エディション, Hepburn: Nō Moa Hīrōzu Reddo Zōn Edishon) on July 21, 2011.

A sequel, No More Heroes 2: Desperate Struggle was released on Wii months prior. No More Heroes III was announced at E3 2019 and released in 2021 for the Nintendo Switch, and later for PlayStation, Xbox, and Windows PC.

== Gameplay ==
Travis Touchdown fighting an enemy in the game

In Heroes' Paradise, the player character, Travis Touchdown travels around on foot or his motorcycle in a free roaming world killing the top ten assassins in order to make the storyline progress. There are numerous part-time job side quests to earn money which can be spent on weapons, training sessions, clothes and video tapes.

Most attacks are performed using a standard control scheme, with certain other moves, including the "death blow" and sword lock struggles, executed by following on-screen instructions. The beam katana can also be upgraded and replaced throughout the game by visiting Dr. Naomi. While the katana does not follow the exact position of the remote, it is able to distinguish between a "high" and "low" position which varies the character stance and the attacks done. In addition to attacks with the beam katana, Travis can kick and punch, and when enemies are stunned, he can throw them with a number of professional wrestling maneuvers, which were previously done by manipulating both the Wii Remote and Nunchuk. Travis has a secondary mode, "Dark Side", that is accessed when three icons line up in a slot machine after a successful death blow.

=== Differences from No More Heroes ===
There have been several changes to the game from the original Wii version. The main differences between the two iterations are:

- High-definition graphics
- English and Japanese (Heroes' Paradise Japanese ver. only) voice acting.
- The addition of the "Very Sweet" mode, which changes certain female characters' clothing to be more revealing.
- Ability to stock Dark Side mode charges, rather than having it activate immediately like in the original.
- Unused Dark Side mode charges left over in the player's stock at the end of a Ranking Battle rewards Travis Touchdown with additional LB dollars (as was the case with unused Anarchy in the Galaxy stocks in the original version).
- Ability to warp straight to any Side-Job or Assassin Mission once the player has beaten any of them at least once.
- A retry option was added to the Side-Jobs, Assassin Missions, and Free Fights. However, it only appears when the player has failed in either.
- Five new Side-Jobs were added.
- Five new Assassin Missions were added.
- Extra bosses from No More Heroes 2: Desperate Struggle are available to fight at certain points in the game.
- Players are now able to replay boss battles and cinematics.
- A "Score Attack" mode has been added that lets the player refight all of the game's bosses and compete for a high score on an online leaderboard.
- The northern section of Santa Destroy was blocked off, with any collectibles and missions located in that area moved to the rest of the map.

=== PlayStation Move support ===
Player using the PlayStation Move controller for Travis powering up the katana

Unlike the original Japanese release of the game, the North American and European release of the game include PlayStation Move support at launch. This is the only difference between the PlayStation 3 and Xbox 360 versions of the game. Players can use the PlayStation Move controller to recharge the katana, since the beam katanas run on batteries, as well as control it to execute attacks and advanced combos, much like the Wii version.

== Development ==
On November 17, 2009, Famitsu magazine revealed that No More Heroes would receive a port to both the PlayStation 3 and Xbox 360 from the company feelplus.

Shortly after the announcement of the game in November 2009, the North American and European publisher of the original, Ubisoft and Rising Star Games, announced that they would not be localizing the game. On June 28, 2010 Ignition Entertainment, when asked if they were publishing the game abroad, commented that they "were looking at it (but they) believe that another publisher will publish it." At Gamescom 2010 in August, Konami announced at their press conference that they were bringing only the PlayStation 3 version to North America and Europe in 2011 with added PlayStation Move support. A Press release was also given to provide additional information on the improvements made on the Western localization of the game. A North American release was formally announced on the PlayStation Blog by Jeff Reubenstein, formally unveiling the title's Move support as well as PS3 exclusivity.

The defeat of Destroy Man. With the Western PlayStation localization, blood is available in the game.

When the game was released in Japan, the PlayStation 3 version of the game was censored similar to its Wii predecessor attaining a "D" rating from CERO which is equivalent to a "Mature" rating from ESRB while the Xbox 360 version of the game remained uncensored similar to the North American release of its Wii predecessor causing it to receive a "Z" rating equivalent to the "Adult Only" rating from ESRB. However, the North American and European PlayStation 3 release of the game are uncensored. The Japanese Red Zone Edition, which is based on the international release, is similarly uncensored and received a "Z" rating from CERO.

By pre-ordering from Amazon.co.jp, customers were awarded with bonus cards particular to each console version of the game. The cards featured the game's female characters in semi-erotic poses.

== Reception ==
Reception

Aggregate score
Aggregator	Score
Metacritic	PS3: 72/100

Review scores
Publication	Score
Destructoid	7/10
Eurogamer	8/10
Game Informer	7.75/10
GamesRadar+	3.5/5 stars
IGN	7.5/10
Jeuxvideo.com	16/20
Push Square	8/10 stars

No More Heroes: Heroes' Paradise received "mixed or average" reviews, according to review aggregator Metacritic.

IGN praised the combat and updated visuals, but criticized the screen tearing and slowdowns, as well as the mini-games, calling them tedious. Destructoid said, "...sadly, some of the smaller details that made the original No More Heroes special are gone," citing the Wii Remote's speaker functionality, full soundtrack, and overall personality as the factors that made the Wii version superior. Eurogamer gave high praise to the game's over-the-top presentation and core gameplay but criticized the technical issues of the port, writing, "There's screen-tearing and...the various posters dotted through Santa Destroy have been defiantly embalmed in their original pixellated form, and the on-screen font when you're doing jobs has been irretrievably ruined...No More Heroes should look great in HD, and it kind of does, but the increased resolution also makes some of what was passable into flaws." Game Informer praised the tongue-in-cheek presentation and PlayStation Move controls while being disappointed with its retainment of all the problems present in the original game. GamesRadar wrote positively about the game's large scope, unique gameplay, and soundtrack while panning the Move controls, Sixaxis support, and unimproved visuals. Push Square stated that "It is a shame there wasn't just a little extra effort put into the Move support, but the Move provides a capable and enjoyable way to experience [the game]."

Sales for the Japanese launch of Heroes' Paradise were slightly better than with the original Wii version. The PlayStation 3 and Xbox 360 versions of the game sold 16,000 and 15,000 units respectively in their first week on sale in the country.
