= Travis Touchdown =

Protagonist of the No More Heroes video games

- No More Heroes character
- Travis Touchdown from No More Heroes
- First game: No More Heroes (2007)
- Created by: Goichi Suda
- Designed by: Yūsuke Kozaki; Takeshi Uechi
- Voiced by: English Robin Atkin Downes Japanese Kazuya Nakai

In-universe information
- Weapon: Beam Katana
- Home: Santa Destroy, California
- Nationality: American

Travis Touchdown (Japanese: トラヴィス・タッチダウン, Hepburn: Toravisu Tacchidaun) is a fictional character and the main antihero of the video game franchise No More Heroes. He is 27 years old in the original game, and is both an otaku and a professional assassin, wielding a Beam Katana. He was created by Goichi Suda, and voiced by Kazuya Nakai in Japanese and Robin Atkin Downes in English.

He is named after the protagonist of the film Paris, Texas directed by Wim Wenders. His lifestyle is often compared to that of average people because of his obsession with anime, professional wrestling, pornography, and action figures; however, this lifestyle has also been called an "uber male fantasy." He has received mostly positive reception, with MSNBC describing his appearance as "richly detailed" and "flamboyantly designed".

== Concept and creation ==
Travis Touchdown first appeared in the Wii video game No More Heroes. He was created by Goichi Suda and voiced by Robin Atkin Downes. He was illustrated by Yūsuke Kozaki, and his clothing was designed by Takeshi Uechi. He was based on Jackass star Johnny Knoxville. His beam sword's charging method was based on the "Schwartz" lightsabers from the parody film Spaceballs. Travis' name, like other characters' names in No More Heroes, comes from its sound rather than its meaning. Suda stated that it is a name that sounds cool to Japanese people, but not as much to Western people. Suda comments that he sees some of himself in Travis, and wishes that he could react to things like Travis does. Travis' luchador fandom comes from Suda's love of the sport.

Suda was disappointed with the quality of Travis' wrestling techniques, and performed some of them on the animators to demonstrate. Certain other details of Travis are based on Suda, including the sound of a key ring jingling in his pocket and his love of cats. A Ubisoft contest was held to allow one winner's design to be used in Desperate Struggle for one of Travis' T-shirts. In an interview with Nintendo Power, Suda stated that he wanted Travis to become a huge star, stating that this was one of the reasons he wanted to make Desperate Struggle as interesting as possible. Nintendo Power editors told Joystiq that Suda considers Travis his favorite character. The Californian setting of No More Heroes is partially based on Travis, who Suda stated had a variety of frustrations and emotions that helped him fit in with that setting. Although Suda had stated that No More Heroes 2 would be Travis' last appearance in the series, finishing his story, Travis reprised his role as the main protagonist in the 2019 installment Travis Strikes Again: No More Heroes and in the 2021 installment No More Heroes III. Suda remarked that a return for Travis in a potential No More Heroes 4 would likely not take place for another ten years, due in part to Marvelous' ownership of the No More Heroes IP.

== Characteristics ==
Travis Touchdown is an American assassin and stereotypical otaku – his motel room decorated with professional wrestling and anime collectibles – living in near poverty in the motel "NO MORE HEROES" of Santa Destroy, California. 27 years old in No More Heroes, he collects wrestling masks, and learns a number of lucha libre moves from his mentor, Thunder Ryu. He is also a fan of a mecha anime series called "Glastonbury", inspired by Space Runaway Ideon, and a moe-driven series, "Bizarre Jelly", a parody of Pretty Cure. He also has a pet cat named Jeane that he dotes on. He owns a "beam katana" which he won in an online auction, as well as a large rocket-powered motorcycle, dubbed the "Schpeltiger", which he uses for transport.

Travis' beam katana, Blood Berry, is Travis' primary method of attack. It is often compared to the lightsaber from the Star Wars franchise. While No More Heroes features multiple Star Wars parodies, IGN editor Scott Lowe comments that the two have subtle differences. Both can cut through any material, but the mechanism of the Beam Katana involves a beam loop rather than simply a handle, and can also be charged or shoot energy projectiles. Other beam katanas, while lacking the beam loop, have unique blade designs. Travis can purchase three additional beam katanas in the course of No More Heroes from the character Dr. Naomi: the Tsubaki Mk-I, an improved version of the Blood Berry, the Mk-II, a powerful five-beam weapon, and the Mk-III, created from Thunder Ryu's katana and regarded by Naomi as the ultimate version. In No More Heroes 2, Travis can wield four types of beam katanas, including dual katanas called the "Rose Nasty" and a "giant beam katana" called the Peony. The Mk. III is present as well, along with the Blood Berry

== Appearances ==
In No More Heroes, Travis becomes a hitman, referred to in-game as an assassin, after he runs out of money to buy video games. He accepts a job from a woman named Sylvia Christel to kill Helter Skelter, also known as "the Drifter," which earns him rank 11 in the United Assassins Association, a governing body of assassins that Christel supposedly works for. Realizing that he has now made himself a target for aspiring assassins, he sets out to secure himself as number one in the UAA. After defeating the nine assassins above him, the final assassin, Dark Star, claims to be his father in a manner reminiscent of Darth Vader. However, he is subsequently killed by Travis' half-sister, Jeane, who details how she had previously murdered his parents because of their father's sexual abuse. Travis wins against Jeane because of the assistance of another assassin, Shinobu, whom he had spared. A mysterious, Irish assassin named Henry professes to be Travis' twin brother as well as Sylvia's husband, also explaining that her true identity is that of a con artist who had set up the UAA as a scam and helped Travis exact vengeance on Jeane. The game ends in the midst of a battle between them.

In No More Heroes 2: Desperate Struggle, Travis rejoins the UAA to avenge the death of Bishop, his friend and the owner of a video store. After the last game, it is revealed that Travis has become a legend among assassins as someone who managed to walk away from the Number One Rank. Some referred to him as The Crownless King or The "No More" Hero as a result of this, and he is seen in graffiti as a figure similar to Che Guevara. With Bishop's death, however, Travis became increasingly angry and frustrated not only with himself but the assassination scene, vowing to tear down the UAA once he kills the man who ordered Bishop's death. At the very end, Travis reconciles with Sylvia, and the two become lovers. Their ultimate fate, however, is unknown.

In Travis Strikes Again: No More Heroes, seven years after the events of the second game, Travis is attacked by Badman, an assassin who seeks retribution for the death of his daughter Bad Girl. The two are pulled into Travis's Death Drive MK-II game console, and must fight their way through Travis's game collection to escape. Travis returns as the main protagonist of No More Heroes III, now seeking to stop alien marauders from conquering the Earth.

Outside of the No More Heroes series, Travis also appears in Dragon's Dogma: Dark Arisen on the Nintendo Switch as part of a collaboration with Capcom and Grasshopper Manufacture to feature a downloadable pawn named "Travis TD" from April 25 to July 8, 2019. A Mii Fighter costume based on Travis was added to Super Smash Bros. Ultimate via downloadable content on October 13, 2020. On the album The Outer Rim, tracks 1 and 5 both feature conversations between Travis and Sylvia, who, unlike their ambiguous relationship in No More Heroes, are both deeply in love with each other. It is revealed in the first track that the two married and subsequently traveled into space, and also that they have become immortal.

== Reception ==
MSNBC editor Scott Taves praised Travis Touchdown's design as richly detailed and flamboyantly designed. Jason Hill of the Sydney Morning Herald described Touchdown as an "absurd, shallow, and pitiful creature", commenting that he is an analogue to gamers. Sean Ewing of The Star-Ledger called Touchdown the poster-child for what anti-video game extremists like Jack Thompson think gamers are like. Nintendo Power listed Travis as their 15th favourite hero, stating that he is kind of like them, except that they aren't "lewd, beam katana-wielding assassins". Game Zone editor Stephen Woodward compared Travis to everyday people living in an uber male fantasy, citing him being an otaku and being a luchador fan. PALGN editor David Low described Touchdown as what gamers want to be, though commenting that Suda 51 "accidentally" incorporated the nerdy aspects of his personality into his character. Tampa Bay Online editor Doug Bell found the character rude and detached, but not funny or cool, calling the other assassins better characters. Game Informer editor Matt Miller suggested that there is a connection between sex and extreme violence with Travis, citing a scene where he waits to confess his love to a woman only after she has blown her head off with a grenade. GamesRadar listed him as the seventh greatest assassin, commenting that in spite of his social awkwardness, he is actually a pretty competent assassin. In discussing the "brooding pretty boy" cliché, they used him as an example of the opposite of this cliché, stating that while he has some qualities of this character type, his personality sets him apart.

Travis has been compared to other characters in fiction, primarily action characters. GameRevolution editor Jesse Constantino comments that while Grasshopper Manufacture tries to portray him as punk, he's no more punk than his grandmother's doll collection, comparing him to Sam Spade of The Maltese Falcon. Game designer Steve Gaynor compared Travis' clothing to that of Tyler Durden of Fight Club. He has been compared to another character from Goichi Suda in the video game Flower, Sun, and Rain called Sumio Mondo. Game Style editor Garry Webber described him as an unashamedly geeky otaku as well as an amoral contemptuous assassin, but added that this was why he was so likable. G4 TV editor Matt Kiel stated that Travis is an especially noteworthy aspect of the quality plot, adding that while he's amoral and a jerk, he is one of the most likable video game characters in a long time. Fox News editor Lou Kesten described Travis as the Wii's most ridiculously violent hero. He was awarded best new character of 2008 by GamePro magazine, and was nominated by GameSpot for the same award.

Goichi Suda expressed interest over the years in seeing Travis appear in the Super Smash Bros. series. Joystiq editor Randy Nelson agreed, stating that he would love to see Travis with his beam katana in the next title. Destructoid editor James Stephanie Sterling commented that the close relationship between Suda and Hideo Kojima, whose character Solid Snake had already been added Super Smash Bros. Brawl, makes it possible that he could appear. Escapist Magazine editor Keane Ng expressed the opinion that while the two third party characters included in Super Smash Bros. Brawl, Solid Snake and Sonic the Hedgehog, were highly popular characters, Travis is an unlikely character due to being far less recognizable. He added that while Snake was from a Mature-rated video game, he fit in well; Travis' personality would make him too difficult to include, despite his fighting style being similar to other Smash Bros. characters. A downloadable Travis Touchdown costume for the Mii Swordfighter character, based on the Travis Strikes Again design, was added to Super Smash Bros. Ultimate in 2020.
