= Killer Is Dead =

2013 video game

- North American cover art
- Developer: Grasshopper Manufacture (Note: Additional work for Windows by Kadokawa Games)
- Publishers: PlayStation 3, Xbox 360; JP: Kadokawa Games; NA: Xseed Games; PAL: Deep Silver Windows; Deep Silver
- Director: Hideyuki Shin
- Producers: Yoshimi Yasuda; Shuji Ishikawa
- Designers: Tadayuki Noumaru; Kees Gajentaan; Hikaru Tamada
- Artists: Takashi Kasahara; Yusuke Ito
- Writers: Goichi Suda; Keisuke Makino; Yudai Yamaguchi; Hideyuki Shin
- Composers: Akira Yamaoka; Ryo Koike; Yasuhiro Isoda; Kouta Kanno
- Engine: Unreal Engine 3
- Platforms: PlayStation 3, Xbox 360, Windows
- Release: August 1, 2013: PlayStation 3, Xbox 360; JP: August 1, 2013; NA: August 27, 2013; AU: August 29, 2013; EU: August 30, 2013 Windows; WW: May 23, 2014
- Genres: Action, hack and slash
- Mode: Single-player

Killer Is Dead (Note: Japanese: キラー・イズ・デッド, Hepburn: Kirā Izu Deddo) is a hack and slash video game developed by Grasshopper Manufacture. It was released for PlayStation 3 and Xbox 360 in August 2013 and for Windows in May 2014. It is published by Kadokawa Games in Japan, Xseed Games in North America and Deep Silver in Europe.

== Gameplay ==
A "Scarlet" side mission in Killer Is Dead; Mondo fights off a group of enemies within a time limit.

Killer Is Dead is an action game where players take control of protagonist Mondo Zappa. As Zappa, the player goes through twelve story-driven missions selected from a world map; they range from short linear levels to longer levels that require exploration. Some level areas also require the activation of switches to move forward. During missions, Mondo fights a variety of enemies using his katana and cybernetic gun arm; using the latter changes the camera angle to an over-the-shoulder perspective.

The combat of Killer Is Dead relies on maintaining the combo meter. Each time Mondo hits an enemy, he starts a combo chain which grows as long as Mondo lands consecutive hits without an enemy hitting him. At the highest combo level, special attacks are unlocked which provide different upgrade materials. Some enemies can only be finished off with a cinematic final attack, triggered once Mondo has absorbed enough blood from his enemies by chaining together combos. Mondo can both block and dodge attacks. Dodging plays to combat, as dodging at the right moment causes Mondo to enter Adrenaline Rush, where enemies are slowed and Mondo can land rapid attacks. Mondo's gun arm can transform into three gun types; the rapid fire "Bullet Shot" type, the "Freeze Shooter" which fires ice bullets to slow and even stop enemies, and the power "Charge Cannon" which deals higher damage when shots are charged up.

The game features three mission types: story-based missions that move the narrative forward; sub-missions set within the main levels where Mondo must complete tasks that can vary from pure combat missions to retrieval quests; and "Scarlet" missions where the female support character Scarlet issues combat challenges. After completing each mission, the player is awarded with a rank and a consequent level of upgrade items and in-game currency. These can be used for a fourth mission type dubbed "Gigolo Missions". During Gigolo Missions, Mondo goes out with a selection of women and fill up a "Guts" meter by making eye contact, with more intimate areas such as their breasts granting more points. The woman's attachment to Mondo is increased by buying and presenting gifts during the mission; gifts for the women range from flowers and chocolates to types of lingerie. If the women sees you looking at those areas, a second meter decreases and if it empties Mondo fails the mission. Successfully completing Gigolo Missions grants Mondo access to weapon upgrades.

== Synopsis ==
=== Setting and characters ===
Killer Is Dead is set on a near future version of Earth, where space tourism and cybernetic enhancements have become a reality. A key element of the story is Dark Matter, a malign energy stemming from the dark side of the Moon that negatively affects weak-willed humans and generates mindless monsters called Wires. It is the job of a government-funded group dubbed the Bryan Execution Firm to kill those infected with Dark Matter using people known as "Executioners", although doing so will inevitably lead the chosen Executioner to be overwhelmed by Dark Matter.

The main protagonist is Mondo Zappa, a new Executioner with a business-like attitude towards his work and a liking for beautiful women. His superiors at the Bryan Execution Firm are its cyborg founder Bryan Roses and his second-in-command Vivienne Squall. Mondo is assisted and lives with Mika Takekawa, an air-headed young girl. Three key characters are David, the main antagonist who usurps control of the Moon and directs the Dark Matter; Dolly the Dream Witch, a woman who can enter a person's dreams and alter their memories; and Moon River, the previous ruler of the Moon and one of an ancient line that acted as magistrates and overseers of the Earth. Many characters are thematically connected to celestial bodies; Mondo represents the Earth, David symbolises Mars, Mika the Sun, Moon River the Moon.

=== Plot ===
The game opens with an unhinged former assassin-turned-kidnapper Tokio being killed by his replacement, his darkness ascending to the Moon. Two years later, Mondo witnesses the death of his predecessor at Bryan's hands. Mondo is then sent on missions against people who have been tainted by Malice, which causes them to become warped into monsters and perform evil deeds. One of his earliest missions is given by Moon River, ruler of the Moon, to kill David after he usurps her. Mondo and David fight, but Mondo is unable to kill him and David cryptically hints that he needs to grow stronger by absorbing the blood of those corrupted by Dark Matter. Moon River decides to wait until the contract can be completed, and Mondo allows her to live with him until then.

Mondo goes on further missions against people infected with Dark Matter. Following each execution, a piece of the targets' Dark Matter and their blood is absorbed by Mondo's arm, causing him great pain. He is also tormented in his dreams by Dolly, seeing flashbacks of Moon River playing with him as a child with a strange blue unicorn; and David attacking his home, killing his mother and cutting off Mondo's arm before being left at the Bryan Execution Firm by the unicorn. During one mission, Vivienne considers killing Mondo as the Dark Matter begins overtaking him. On another mission, Bryan is nearly killed by Mika, who is likewise being influenced by Dolly.

During his final confrontation with Dolly to free both himself and Mika from her influence, Mondo remembers the truth; he and David are brothers, David was one of Bryan's former Executioners before being tainted with Dark Matter. Mondo was then groomed by Bryan to take down David. David in turn planted Mika—the girl kidnapped by Tokio and rescued by David—as a spy to find out who would be David's assigned killer, and plans to make Mondo the Moon's new ruler while he conquers Earth. In a final confrontation on the Moon, Mondo and David face off, with Mondo using the power of Dark Matter to win the fight. Absorbing David's blood pushes Mondo over the edge, and he cuts off his cyborg arm in an attempt to stem the flow of Dark Matter. The game ends with Mondo taking David's place as ruler of the Moon and its Dark Matter, and Moon River issuing a new contract for Mondo's life.

== Development ==
Planning for Killer Is Dead began in late 2009 and proper development started in early 2011. Suda was inspired to title the project Killer Is Dead after The Smiths's song "The Queen is Dead". Initially the title was only a placeholder; over time Suda felt the name matched the style he wanted. The game was announced in April 2012, the debut trailer premiered in January 2013. Suda describes it as a "Dark Side 007" game, drawing inspiration from Ian Fleming's James Bond books and films. Unlike Bond, the main character of Killer Is Dead deals with a seedier underworld that the surface world does not register.

The game is not a sequel to Killer7 but it maintains the essence of his past "assassin series" games and "picks up where Killer7 and No More Heroes left off". Suda also calls the game "yin" to bright and cheery Lollipop Chainsaw's "yang". Gameplay feature swords like in No More Heroes but with expanded systems, guns, and wrestling action. The visual style is an enhancement and evolution of the cel-shaded style of No More Heroes. The team had originally experimented with a realistic graphical style and a cartoon style reminiscent of Killer7 before settling on the final design.

== Release ==
The game was released in summer 2013, published by Kadokawa Games in Japan and Marvelous USA in North America. Deep Silver, the European publisher, and Sony Computer Entertainment Asia, the publisher for the Asian release outside Japan, announced that these editions of the game would include both English and original Japanese voice acting tracks.

A PC version was announced on February 17, 2014 as Killer Is Dead: Nightmare Edition. It was released on May 23, 2014 on a disc and as a digital download. It includes a new difficulty mode called Nightmare, in which enemies can only be defeated using three attacks: Adrenaline Burst, Dodge Burst and Headshots.

== Reception ==
Reception

Aggregate score
Aggregator	Score
Metacritic	(PS3) 64/100 (X360) 64/100 (PC) 71/100

Review scores
Publication	Score
Electronic Gaming Monthly	6/10
Famitsu	35/40
Game Informer	6/10
GameSpot	5/10
GameTrailers	6.7/10
IGN	5/10
Joystiq	3.5/5
Polygon	4.5/10

During its first week, the PS3 version of Killer Is Dead debuted in fifth place, selling just over 17,700 units. By the end of 2013, the PS3 version had sold a little over 23,000 units. In the United Kingdom, the game did poorly during its debut month, reaching twenty-sixth place behind many other new titles including Lost Planet 3 and Rayman Legends. As of May 6th, 2025 the games has sold over 1 million copies.

The PS3 and 360 versions of the game both scored 64 out of 100 on review aggregate site Metacritic, based on 39 and 38 critic reviews respectively. Japanese magazine Famitsu gave the game a Platinum award as part of its review; its world design and gameplay were both praised, but the magazine criticised control issues similar to those seen in earlier Grasshopper Manufacture games. Western critics were generally mixed about the game. The story was cited as either poorly written or confusing, while the gameplay was praised for its emphasis on dodging despite a lack of evolution for secondary mechanics. The art design was also praised, but reaction to the music was mixed and voice acting was described as poor. The Gigolo missions were panned by Western critics due to their negative portrayal of women and the actions the player was forced to take to complete them. Control issues were also called out by several critics, in addition to other technical issues.

The PC-exclusive Nightmare Edition scored 71 points out of 100 on Metacritic, based on 8 critic reviews. Adam Beck of Hardcore Gamer gave the game a score of 4/5 and was generally positive; he compared the story's tone favorably to Only God Forgives and praised both the level design and gameplay, but found its PC version underwhelming due to a lack of graphical options and poor control optimization. In contrast, PC Gamer's Andy Kelly gave a score of 45 out of 100 points, calling it both a weak game compared to Suda's previous work and a poor port of the console version due to similar issues to those raised by Beck, referring to it as the "very definition of style over substance".
