= No More Heroes (series) =

Video game series

- Genres: Action-adventure, hack and slash
- Developers: Grasshopper Manufacture; feelplus; AQ Interactive
- Publishers: Marvelous Entertainment; Ubisoft; Rising Star Games; Konami; Marvelous; Grasshopper Manufacture; Xseed Games
- Creator: Goichi Suda
- Platforms: Wii, PlayStation 3, Xbox 360, Android, iOS, Nintendo Switch, PlayStation 4, Microsoft Windows, Amazon Luna, Xbox One, PlayStation 5, Xbox Series X/S
- First release: No More Heroes; December 6, 2007
- Latest release: No More Heroes III; August 27, 2021

No More Heroes (Japanese: ノーモア★ヒーローズ, Hepburn: Nō Moa Hīrōzu) is an action-adventure hack and slash video game series developed by Grasshopper Manufacture and was created by Goichi Suda, also known by his nickname Suda51. The series' title comes from the album title No More Heroes, which was released by the British punk band The Stranglers. The games follows Travis Touchdown, a fan of video games, anime, manga and wrestling who wins a beam katana in an auction, through which he inadvertently becomes involved in the United Assassins Association and is forced to kill assassins higher in rank to prevent other assassins from targeting him.

A total of five No More Heroes titles have been released worldwide.

== Gameplay ==
Throughout the games, the player controls the character Travis Touchdown. The first game has a free roaming world, allowing Travis to move around on foot or on his modified scooter, the "Schpeltiger". The gameplay is open-ended, with the condition that the player must kill the top ten assassins to make the storyline progress. There are numerous part-time job side quests to earn money which can be spent on weapons, training sessions, clothes and videotapes. In several of the games, money is also required to compete in a Ranking fight with one of the top assassins. In No More Heroes 2: Desperate Struggle, the open world is replaced by a map screen, and the minigames that Travis can do to gain money and become stronger are 8-bit style games, in genres including action, puzzle, and racing.

While recent ports and entries contain more traditional control options, the mainline games are heavily designed to support motion control combat. On the Wii, control is handled through the Wii Remote and Nunchuk attachment, with the Remote controlling his weapon, the beam katana, and the Nunchuk moving Travis. Most attacks are performed using the "A" button, with certain other moves, including the "death blow" and sword lock struggles, executed by performing on-screen prompts and directional motions. Further, since the beam katanas run on batteries, they must be charged from time to time by pressing the "1" button on the remote and shaking it. Travis's beam katana can also be upgraded and replaced throughout the game by visiting Dr. Naomi. While the katana does not follow the exact position of the remote, it is able to distinguish between a "high" and "low" position which varies the character's stance and the attacks done. In addition to attacks with the beam katana Travis can kick and punch, and when enemies are stunned he can throw them with a number of professional wrestling maneuvers, done by manipulating both the Wii Remote and Nunchuk. Upon successfully killing enemies, Travis has a chance to activate a "dark side mode", represented by a random roll of a slot machine. If the slots are lined up he will receive a temporary power-up based on the slot, which can range from attacks being able to instantly set up death blows, to sending out a shockwave that kills all enemies in the area.

Starting from No More Heroes 2: Desperate Struggle, the series introduced additional playable characters such as Shinobu Jacobs and Henry Cooldown, who control differently from Travis. The game also expanded Travis' move repertoire by allowing him to switch beam katanas in combat and introducing the "Ecstasy Gauge", which rewards the player with passive boosts when successfully dealing uncontested damage, as well as offering a unique dark side mode on command. Introduced in Travis Strikes Again: No More Heroes, is the ability to equip "Skill Chips" (named after Gundam models) that allow the player to utilize an array of special attacks, ranging from a scattergun-type blast to an orbital laser.

== Games ==
Release timeline
2007	No More Heroes
2008
2009
2010	No More Heroes 2: Desperate Struggle
2010	No More Heroes: Heroes' Paradise
2011
2012	No More Heroes: World Ranker
2013
2014
2015
2016
2017
2018
2019	Travis Strikes Again: No More Heroes
2020
2021	No More Heroes III

=== Main series ===
==== No More Heroes (2007) ====
Released on Wii in 2007, the story follows Travis Touchdown, who is a stereotypical otaku – his motel room decorated with professional wrestling and anime collectibles – living in near poverty in the No More Heroes motel of the fictional town of Santa Destroy, California. After winning a beam katana in an internet auction, he runs out of money to buy video games and wrestling videos. After meeting with Sylvia Christel, he accepts a job to kill Helter Skelter, also known as "the Drifter", which earns him rank 11 by the United Assassins Association, a governing body of assassins. Realizing that he has the opportunity to make it to the top, he sets out to secure himself the coveted position of number one assassin in the UAA.

An enhanced port, No More Heroes: Heroes' Paradise, was released on PlayStation 3 and Xbox 360 in 2010. A port of the original version was later released for the Nintendo Switch in 2020, and for Microsoft Windows & Amazon Luna in 2021.

==== No More Heroes 2: Desperate Struggle (2010) ====
Released on Wii in 2010, set three years after Travis Touchdown became the top assassin in the United Assassins Association (UAA) and walked away. Travis has returned to Santa Destroy and fights Skelter Helter, who seeks revenge on Travis for killing his older brother Helter Skelter prior to the first game. After winning the battle, he meets Sylvia Christel, who informs him he is ranked as the 51st best assassin. The nearly-dead Skelter Helter interrupts them and warns Travis that he and his co-conspirators will still have their revenge.

A port of Desperate Struggle was later released for the Nintendo Switch in 2020, and for the Amazon Luna in 2021.

==== Travis Strikes Again: No More Heroes (2019) ====
Released on Nintendo Switch in 2019, the game is primarily viewed from a top-down perspective as opposed to the third person view of main series. Travis Touchdown fights Badman, the father of Bad Girl, an assassin Travis previously killed. The two are drawn into a possessed video game console, and must fight through its various games. As the first title Suda has directed since the first No More Heroes, Suda has collaborated with several indie developers to feature elements from their games in Travis Strikes Again. While part of the No More Heroes story, Suda does not consider the game a direct sequel to the previous title No More Heroes 2: Desperate Struggle, but a fresh start for the character Travis.

A port of Travis Strikes Again, subtitled as Complete Edition, was released for PlayStation 4 and Windows later in 2019.

==== No More Heroes III (2021) ====
Released on August 27, 2021, for the Nintendo Switch, No More Heroes III takes place 9 years after No More Heroes 2 and 2 years after Travis Strikes Again: No More Heroes, and has Travis return to his hometown of Santa Destroy from his exile. He encounters a huge artificial metropolis floating in the sea, and a mysterious flying object high above the city. Travis now has to defend the world from a super powerful army of aliens.

Ports for the PlayStation 4, PlayStation 5, Xbox One, Xbox Series X/S, and Windows were released in 2022.

=== Spin-offs ===
==== No More Heroes: World Ranker (2012) ====
Released on Android and iOS in 2012 in Japan only, players can create their own assassin and complete missions, killing assassins to move up in rank. It featured touchscreen controls and multiplayer/social elements. The game has been since removed from servers.

== Legacy ==
Travis Touchdown appears in Dragon's Dogma: Dark Arisen on the Nintendo Switch as part of a collaboration with Capcom and Grasshopper Manufacture to feature a downloadable pawn named "Travis TD" from April 25 to July 8, 2019.

Travis also appears as a downloadable Mii Fighter costume in Super Smash Bros. Ultimate, along with three spirits based on No More Heroes III added in celebration of the game's release.
