= Grasshopper Manufacture =

Japanese video game developer

Grasshopper Manufacture Inc.
- Native name: 株式会社グラスホッパー・マニファクチュア
- Romanized name: Kabushiki Gaisha Gurasuhoppā Manifakuchua
- Type: Independent
- Industry: Video games
- Founded: 30 March 1998; 28 years ago; Suginami, Tokyo, Japan
- Founder: Goichi Suda
- Headquarters: Bunkyō, Tokyo, Japan
- Key people: Goichi Suda (CEO)
- Products: Flower, Sun, and Rain; killer7; No More Heroes; The Silver Case; Killer Is Dead
- Number of employees: 53 (2023)
- Parent: GungHo Online Entertainment (2013–2021); NetEase Games (2021–2026)
- Website: grasshopper.co.jp

Grasshopper Manufacture Inc. (株式会社グラスホッパー・マニファクチュア, Kabushiki Gaisha Gurasuhoppā Manifakuchua) is a Japanese video game developer founded on March 30, 1998 by Goichi Suda. They are well known for creating titles such as killer7 and the No More Heroes series.

== History ==
The company was founded on March 30, 1998 in Suginami, Japan. Its founder, Goichi Suda, gave two reasons why he chose the name "Grasshopper:" The first being a reference to the song of the same name by UK band Ride, which he was listening to on repeat when forming the company. The second reason is that, originally, he wanted to use the Japanese word "battamon" as the company’s name. "Batta" means "grasshopper" and "mon" is "a thing", and when the words are put together, it means "copy" or "fake". However, he later changed his mind and stuck to Grasshopper instead. The word "Manufacture" was added in because his game company was about "building things."

Headed by Suda, GhM were responsible for several original titles, ones that are also fraught with financial risk, but ultimately gained international mainstream attention in 2005 for the GameCube and PlayStation 2 game Killer7. Following releases included Michigan: Report from Hell (released in Japan, Europe), the Nintendo DS game Contact, the Wii game No More Heroes and its sequel No More Heroes 2: Desperate Struggle, and Shadows of the Damned. Potential losses were often made up by the development of games based on popular anime franchises, such as Samurai Champloo: Sidetracked, Blood+: One Night Kiss, and Rebuild of Evangelion: Sound Impact. In May 2007, Suda announced during a speech at the 2007 Game Developers Conference that Grasshopper was at the time working on three titles for the Wii, two of which were released: No More Heroes and Fatal Frame IV. There is no available information on the status of the third Wii game in development then.

Grasshopper was said to be working on an Xbox 360 title, and presented a concept for a PlayStation 3 game called Kurayami, a non-linear action-adventure inspired by the worrying and confused universe of the Czech writer Franz Kafka, whom Suda admires. This was later cancelled and reincorporated ideas were put into the game Shadows of the Damned. In 2010, Yasuhiro Wada joined Grasshopper Manufacture as COO. He then left Grasshopper, and founded the company Toybox in 2011. During development of Shadows of the Damned, the employee count of Grasshopper would double to 140.

On 30 January 2013, Grasshopper Manufacture was acquired by GungHo Online Entertainment. Their first title released under GungHo was Let It Die. In 2018, the company would post a notice of an absorption-type split over issues in management, confirming that new Grasshopper Manufacture, Inc. would now operate independently of GungHo and work on their own intellectual property such as No More Heroes under Goichi Suda's management. The unit responsible for the development of Let It Die would rebrand into Supertrick Games and continue development of games within the IP. Grasshopper Manufacture would subsequently downsize to a more indie scaled studio, hosting 20 employees as of 2019.

The company's first title developed after the split was Travis Strikes Again: No More Heroes, a spinoff entry in the No More Heroes series, marketed as a return for the franchise, a tribute to indie games and a commemorative title for Grasshopper Manufacture's history. The game was followed up with No More Heroes III, the first proper mainline installment for the franchise since 2010. The game retains the core development team from the previous title and was developed in collaboration with outsourced staff, being self-published by Grasshopper Manufacture, with physical distribution assistance from Nintendo. As a pair, the games mark Goichi Suda's return to a directorial role, having not directed a game since the original No More Heroes in 2007.

Grasshopper was acquired from GungHo by NetEase Games by October 2021. In announcing the acquisition, Grasshopper stated that they had plans for at least three major games in the next ten years. In May 2022, it was revealed that Grasshopper opened a new studio named Yabukiri Studio, while they teased the announcement of a new game. In June 2025, the studio announced Romeo Is A Dead Man.

In September 2026, Grasshopper announced that they had separated from NetEase and returned to independency. In a press statement, the company expressed a desire to deliver games with a wider variety of styles and that their increased experience with self-publishing had enabled a number of options for the future.

== Games developed ==
Year	Title	Publisher	Platform(s)	Notes
1999	The Silver Case	ASCII Entertainment	PlayStation	—N/a
2001	Flower, Sun, and Rain	Victor Interactive Software	PlayStation 2	—N/a
2002	Shining Soul	Sega	Game Boy Advance	Co-developed with Nextech
2003	Shining Soul II	Sega	Game Boy Advance	Co-developed with Nextech
2004	Michigan: Report from Hell	Spike	PlayStation 2	—N/a
2005	Killer7	Capcom	GameCube, PlayStation 2	Co-developed with Capcom Production Studio 4
2005	The 25th Ward: The Silver Case	Genki	Mobile	—N/a
2006	Samurai Champloo: Sidetracked	Namco Bandai Games	PlayStation 2	—N/a
2006	Contact	Marvelous Entertainment	Nintendo DS	—N/a
2006	Blood+: One Night Kiss	Namco Bandai Games	PlayStation 2	—N/a
2007	No More Heroes	Marvelous Entertainment	Wii	—N/a
2008	Fatal Frame: Mask of the Lunar Eclipse	Nintendo	Wii	Co-developed with Tecmo and Nintendo SPD
2010	No More Heroes 2: Desperate Struggle	Marvelous Entertainment	Wii	—N/a
2011	Frog Minutes	Grasshopper Manufacture	iOS	—N/a
2011	Shadows of the Damned	Electronic Arts	PlayStation 3, Xbox 360	—N/a
2011	Rebuild of Evangelion: Sound Impact	Namco Bandai Games	PlayStation Portable	—N/a
2012	Sine Mora	Digital Reality	Android, iOS, Ouya, PlayStation 3, PlayStation Vita, Windows, Xbox 360	Co-developed with Digital Reality
2012	Diabolical Pitch	Microsoft Studios	Xbox 360	—N/a
2012	Liberation Maiden	Level-5	Nintendo 3DS, iOS	—N/a
2012	Lollipop Chainsaw	Kadokawa Games	PlayStation 3, Xbox 360	—N/a
2012	No More Heroes: World Ranker	Marvelous AQL	Android, iOS	—N/a
2012	Black Knight Sword	Digital Reality	PlayStation 3, Xbox 360	Co-developed with Digital Reality
2013	Killer Is Dead	Kadokawa Games	PlayStation 3, Xbox 360	—N/a
2014	Ranko Tsukigime's Longest Day	Bandai Namco Games	PlayStation 3	Co-developed with Crispy's!
2016	Let It Die	GungHo Online Entertainment	PlayStation 4, Windows	Co-developed with Supertrick Games
2019	Travis Strikes Again: No More Heroes	Grasshopper Manufacture	Nintendo Switch, PlayStation 4, Windows	PlayStation and Windows versions published by Marvelous
2021	No More Heroes III	Grasshopper Manufacture	Nintendo Switch, PlayStation 4, PlayStation 5, Xbox One, Xbox Series X/S, Windows	Grasshopper responsible for developing and publishing Nintendo Switch version. All others published by Marvelous with development outsourced.
2026	Romeo Is a Dead Man	Grasshopper Manufacture	PlayStation 5, Xbox Series X/S, Windows	

== Ports and remakes ==
Despite the commercial and critical success of No More Heroes: Heroes' Paradise, it was not well received among fans or by Suda51 himself and he would only recommend the original Wii version, even years later. Ever since, Suda51 has wanted to be involved in ports of Grasshopper's works, but due to ownership rights, this has not always been possible.

Year	Title	Publisher	Developer	Platform(s)	Supervised by Grasshopper Manufacture	Notes
2008	Flower, Sun, and Rain: Murder and Mystery in Paradise	Marvelous Entertainment	h.a.n.d.	Nintendo DS	Yes	Expanded port with additional puzzles.
2010	No More Heroes: Heroes' Paradise	Marvelous Entertainment	Feelplus; AQ Interactive	PlayStation 3, Xbox 360	No	Features new HD assets and includes bosses from No More Heroes 2. Red Zone Edition developed by AQ Interactive
2014	Killer is Dead: Nightmare Edition	Kadokawa Games	Digital Works Entertainment	Windows	No	—N/a
2016	The Silver Case	Grasshopper Manufacture	Active Gaming Media	Linux, macOS, Nintendo Switch, PlayStation 4, Windows	Yes	HD remaster.
2017	Sine Mora EX	THQ Nordic	Gyroscope Games	PlayStation 4, Windows, Xbox One, Nintendo Switch	No	Expanded port with new content.
2018	The 25th Ward: The Silver Case	NIS America	Active Gaming Media	Linux, macOS, Nintendo Switch, PlayStation 4, Windows	Yes	Full remake in HD.
2018	killer7	NIS America	Engine Software	Windows	Yes	—N/a
2020	No More Heroes	Marvelous	Engine Software	Amazon Luna, Nintendo Switch, Windows	Yes	—N/a
2020	No More Heroes 2: Desperate Struggle	Marvelous	Engine Software	Amazon Luna, Nintendo Switch, Windows	Yes	—N/a
2022	No More Heroes III	Marvelous	Bee Tribe; Muteki	PlayStation 4, PlayStation 5, Xbox One, Xbox Series X/S, Windows	Yes	Bee Tribe responsible for PS4, Xbox One and PC versions. Muteki responsible for PS5 and Xbox Series X/S version.
2023	Fatal Frame: Mask of the Lunar Eclipse	Koei Tecmo	Koei Tecmo	Nintendo Switch, PlayStation 4, PlayStation 5, Xbox One, Xbox Series X/S, Wii, Windows	No	Remastered with improved assets and character models.
2024	Lollipop Chainsaw RePOP	Dragami Games	Dragami Games	Nintendo Switch, PlayStation 4, PlayStation 5, Xbox One, Xbox Series X/S, Windows	No	Remaster without the involvement of Suda51 or James Gunn. Licensed soundtrack did not return.
2024	Shadows of the Damned: Hella Remastered	NetEase Games	Engine Software	Nintendo Switch, PlayStation 4, PlayStation 5, Xbox One, Xbox Series X/S, Windows	Yes	—N/a

== Canceled titles ==
Title	Platform(s)	Notes
The Silver Case The 25th Ward: The Silver Case	Nintendo DS	Originally chosen for the DS due to its popularity, this port was set to be the first western release. Ultimately, the quality did not meet Suda's standard and it was canceled in 2012.
Kurayami	PlayStation 3	Concept that would eventually evolve into Shadows of the Damned. The original incarnation had less emphasis on action.
Lily Bergamo	PlayStation 4	Concept that would eventually evolve into Let It Die. Originally featured an anime artstyle and sported a female protagonist that used bandages in combat.
Project GMD	Unknown	Briefly shown during the 2023 Grasshopper Direct. The blurred footage depicts a cowgirl with some sort of shooting mechanic.
Project MGD	Unknown	Briefly shown during the 2023 Grasshopper Direct. The blurred footage depicts an explosion.
Project SSK	Unknown	Briefly shown during the 2023 Grasshopper Direct. The blurred footage depicts a swordsman cutting through various suited enemies with copious amounts of blood being released, reminiscent of No More Heroes.
