= Travis Strikes Again: No More Heroes =

2019 video game

- Developer: Grasshopper Manufacture
- Publishers: Nintendo Switch; Grasshopper Manufacture; PlayStation 4, Windows; WW: Marvelous; NA: Xseed Games
- Directors: Goichi Suda; Ren Yamazaki
- Producers: Goichi Suda; Kazuyuki Kumagai
- Programmer: Toru Hironaka
- Artists: Boneface; Yūsuke Kozaki
- Writers: Goichi Suda; Masahi Ooka; Keita Takayanagi
- Composers: DJ Kazuhiro "MEEBEE" Abo; DJ 1-2
- Series: No More Heroes
- Engine: Unreal Engine 4
- Platforms: Nintendo Switch; PlayStation 4 Windows
- Release: Nintendo Switch; January 18, 2019; PlayStation 4, Windows; October 17, 2019
- Genres: Action-adventure, hack and slash
- Modes: Single-player, multiplayer

Travis Strikes Again: No More Heroes (Note: Japanese: トラヴィス・ストライクス・アゲイン ノーモア★ヒーローズ, Hepburn: Toravisu Sutoraikusu Agein Nō Moa Hīrōzu) is a 2019 action-adventure game developed and published by Grasshopper Manufacture for the Nintendo Switch. It was released worldwide on January 18, 2019. It was released for the PlayStation 4 and Windows by Marvelous later that year. Directed by Goichi Suda, the game is part of the No More Heroes franchise and features series protagonist Travis Touchdown fighting Badman, the father of Bad Girl (a boss character in the first game). The two are drawn into a possessed video game console, and must fight through its various games. As the first title he has directed since the first No More Heroes, Suda collaborated with numerous indie developers to feature elements from their games in Travis Strikes Again. While part of the No More Heroes series, Suda does not consider the game a direct sequel to the previous title No More Heroes 2: Desperate Struggle, but a fresh start for the character Travis.

Travis Strikes Again: No More Heroes received mixed reviews upon release, with critics praising its story and imaginative presentation, while finding the gameplay aspects repetitive. Five months after the game's initial release, No More Heroes III was announced at E3 2019, acting as a follow-up to the game, and a proper sequel to the series, released on the Nintendo Switch on August 27, 2021.

== Gameplay ==
Travis Touchdown and Badman fighting enemies. The game is viewed from a top-down perspective and allows for cooperative gameplay.

In a change for the series, Travis Strikes Again: No More Heroes is played from a top-down perspective. As Travis, players are tasked with going through multiple video games and defeating the bugs in each game. The levels are inspired by various video game genres such as platforming games and role-playing games. Despite this, gameplay and combat itself predominantly plays out as a hack and slash similar to that of previous No More Heroes titles, occasionally undergoing perspective changes and introducing new gimmicks or minigames that are pertinent to the genre of each individual game.

New to the series is the ability to equip "Skill Chips" (named after Gundam models) that allow the player to utilize an array of special attacks, ranging from a scattergun-type blast to an orbital laser. At the end of each game, the player faces against its residing boss. The game supports two-player co-op with single Joy-Con support, where the second player controls Badman.

Travis can return to his trailer at any time during game play, where the player can purchase new attire to wear, and access the "Death Drive MK-II", which hosts the video games the player will explore. From the trailer, the player can also access "Travis Strikes Back" - an adventure mode designed as a classic visual novel where Travis explores the real world in search for "Death Balls" that contain the Death Drive's video games.

== Plot ==
Seven years after the events of No More Heroes 2, a former professional baseball player turned assassin named Badman is on the run from the Smith Syndicate. He is tracked down by one of the syndicate's assassins, Dan Smith, who is seeking retribution for being double crossed. Badman justifies his actions as being for the sake of his own survival, as he wishes to get revenge on Travis Touchdown, who had murdered his daughter, Bad Girl, during the events of No More Heroes. Dan successfully tracks down Travis' location, granting Badman a Death Ball and allowing Badman to live, under the condition that he kill Travis, and use the ball to resurrect his daughter.

Travis — now 37 years old — has isolated himself and lives in a camper in a forest in Texas, where he spends his time playing video games. When Badman attempts to ambush Travis, the two accidentally awake a dormant video game console in Travis' possession — the "Death Drive MK-II". The console reacts to Badman's Death Ball, and the two get transported into the video game that's contained in it. Travis and Badman learn from the console's AI construct, Death & Drive, that the unreleased console was created by Dr. Juvenile, and completing the six Death Balls that contain the only games developed for the console will grant its player one wish. The two form a truce, opting to team up to locate every Death Ball, and defeat all of the games, in order to resurrect Bad Girl.

Travis interacts with a non-player character. The game's adventure segments are conveyed through a classic visual novel setup.

The game explores Travis' current circumstances and Badman's backstory in visual novel portions that are set between each Death Drive game. In the last seven years, Travis had married former UAA confidant Sylvia Christel, and had two children, though he abandoned his family for their safety, as assassins kept showing up to battle Travis. In his search for the Death Balls, Travis ends up traversing the planet and meeting characters from other Suda51 games, such as Kamui Uehara from The Silver Case, and Mondo Zappa from Killer Is Dead. Travis also receives information about Dr. Juvenile and her past through fax messages from her purported husband, learning that Juvenile is a war orphan with genius intellect and an affinity for video games, who was hired by the US government to develop advanced technology. She also implemented elements of her history and upbringing into the Death Drive's games, such as basing the in-game serial killer "Doppelganger" on her adoptive father.

Travis learns that the Death Drive MK-II was designed as a machine that would create clones of its users, and that while it was initially intended for space travel, the government had re-purposed it to be a super soldier program — a prospect which caused Juvenile to sabotage the project in an act of defiance, and go into hiding. Despite this, the mother machine responsible for its protocols still lays dormant within the CIA, and Travis is warned that completing all six Death Ball games will cause it to reboot, allowing the government to continue developing super soldiers. He is also alerted that should it be reactivated, Juvenile would destroy the United States in retaliation.

Despite warnings, Travis and Badman successfully complete every Death Ball; however one of the games — Killer Marathon — turns out to be an incomplete version of the game. As such, when they wish for Bad Girl's resurrection, she ends up being resurrected in the form of a dog. Travis later ends up locating a prototype for a Death Ball which, rather than transporting him into a video game, transports him directly into the CIA. Massacring his way through the facility he locates the Death Drive mother machine which is being guarded by Dr. Juvenile, who has infiltrated the facility and taken the form of "White Sheepman". Travis, expressing respect for her talents and sympathy for her suffering, reluctantly battles and ultimately defeats her. He interacts with the mother machine and is transported to Mars, where he meets John Winter; the creator of the very original Death Drive and Juvenile's mentor. Winter explains that he retired to Mars to escape Earth's problems, and safeguards the planet, opposing the government's plans to emigrate there. He offers Travis the opportunity to stay on Mars and live a perfect life. Travis declines, realizing that he can't abandon his past, and deciding to face his problems head on. Winter responds by decapitating Travis, as the only way for him to return is to "die".

Back on Earth, Travis is approached by his self-proclaimed pupil, Shinobu Jacobs, who asks him to return from hiding to face the assassins. Travis remarks that it's time for bloodshed. In a playable post-credits segment, Travis is controlled from a third person perspective similar to the previous No More Heroes games, set in a default Unreal Engine level. While attempting to approach a dummy, Travis berates the player for treating the area like a game, saying that they're currently "in development".

=== DLC #2: Bubblegum Fatale ===
Following the events of the main campaign, Travis and Shinobu are intercepted by Travis' twin brother Henry, who is now part of an enigmatic order with a vendetta against Travis. Travis and Shinobu prepare to battle against his subordinates before they're interrupted by a pair of villainous alien lucha libre wrestlers bent on world domination, and a self-proclaimed super hero named "Notorious". When Travis questions the sudden presence of the new characters, Shinobu wonders whether they are foreshadowing "the next game". The standoff is once again interrupted, this time by Death & Drive, who have broken free of the Death Drive MK-II and are seeking a battle against Travis.

Travis manages to beat them in a game of Fire Pro Wrestling, obtaining the location of the completed version of the Killer Marathon Death Ball, which is in the possession of Travis' wife, Sylvia Christel. Travis returns to her estate, obtaining the Death Ball and reconnecting with his daughter and wife in the process. After beating the completed version of Killer Marathon, Travis and Badman successfully resurrect Bad Girl. Travis also spots a glimpse of the Death Drive mother machine, which states that coding has been completed.

== Development ==
The logo of the game was designed by Kojiro Kondo of Black Belt Jones DC, who was also responsible for designing the original No More Heroes series logo.

Following the release of No More Heroes 2, Goichi Suda had been looking for an opportunity to continue the series, but became busy with other projects, such as his involvement with Let It Die. In mid-2016, as work on Let It Die was concluding, he was invited to one of Nintendo's pre-release developer meetings for the then-upcoming Nintendo Switch. While the console was different from the Wii, it offered similar motion-based features through the Joy-Con, and he recognized he could revive No More Heroes for the system. He felt the game would fit in well among the planned Switch titles like The Legend of Zelda: Breath of the Wild and Super Mario Odyssey.

Suda considered the No More Heroes series as "fun slash 'em up kind of games", but with Travis Strikes Again, he wanted to play around with the history of video games and the idea of retro games, and "how Travis would interact with the individual rules and the individual vibe from each game". The six games are new games developed for the title, some in homages to existing indie games, with at least one being a vector scan game.

When originally announced, some took Suda's comments to reflect that the levels would be set within actual indie games like Hotline Miami, but Suda later clarified that these games would be featured as "T-shirt collaborations", with Travis able to unlock and wear clothing items that promote these indie games, a concept he came up with while seeing various game expositions like PAX West. One such title is Hyper Light Drifter, with Nintendo of America showcasing Travis's shirt alongside announcing the game's release on the Switch. Suda wanted players to see Travis as a fan of indie games, not only to give recognition to the indie game scene, but due to his belief that Grasshopper is similar to an indie developer, and he wanted to show his support of the up-and-coming smaller studios. He estimated that there will be at least 15 indie games represented in Travis Strikes Again, with titles to be revealed as part of the ongoing promotion. The game would also see the addition of t-shirts from The Legend of Zelda: Wind Waker, The Legend of Zelda: Majora's Mask and Zelda II: The Adventure of Link that grant Travis a spin attack. The idea of crossing between games was partially influenced by the film Existenz. UK artist Boneface contributed designs for the game's boss battles.

There will also be sections of the game that use the standard gameplay approach as the other No More Heroes titles. One goal of the game for Suda was to have it be completely playable on a single Joy-Con controller for the Nintendo Switch version, simplifying the controls compared to the second game. Reporters from Eurogamer and Polygon have taken Suda's comments that the game may support multiplayer, since the Switch supports two Joy-Con. Suda was unable to speak on this under confidentiality at PAX West, but did tell reporters who asked about this that there are "two main characters, so draw your own conclusions, if you want".

The game is being developed in Unreal Engine 4. At the time of reveal, Robin Atkin Downes, the voice of Travis in the previous titles, had reportedly not been asked to reprise his role in Travis Strikes Again. He was later confirmed to be returning to the role in December 2018.

Travis Strikes Again was teased during the January 2017 reveal conference of the Nintendo Switch. Suda was present for the live event, and appeared on stage to show a promotional image of Travis Touchdown wearing a shirt that said "Travis Strikes Again"; however, no mention of the No More Heroes series was made. Suda said in a later interview that this was a purposeful choice, as he wanted the tease to feature Travis himself as the central focus. The game was formally announced as Travis Strikes Again: No More Heroes in an August 2017 Nintendo Direct, along with further reveals at the PAX West event a few days later. Suda noted that the title's ordering, placing the series' name after Travis Strikes Again, was to allude to the fact he does not consider this game a direct sequel but instead "the beginning of a new adventure, of a new series for Travis" but that still otherwise takes place in the No More Heroes universe. Suda also stated that Travis Strikes Again serves as "something of a stepping stone on the road to No More Heroes 3", and hopes to make a true sequel if the game proves successful enough.

On November 14, 2018, Grasshopper Manufacture announced that Travis Strikes Again would receive a physical edition which would be distributed by Nintendo. The physical version of the game is also bundled with a season pass. The developers have confirmed that some of the additional content will include a new playable character, a new scenario, and a new stage. The first DLC pack was later confirmed to include a scenario for Badman, as well as series-recurring character Shinobu Jacobs as a playable character, while the second pack includes a new scenario for Travis, a new stage for the game Killer Marathon, and Bad Girl from No More Heroes as a playable character. Grasshopper further confirmed that Robin Atkin Downes would be returning in the role as Travis, and that Steve Blum had been cast as Badman. Kimberly Brooks and Kathryn Fiore were confirmed to return in the roles of Shinobu Jacobs and Bad Girl respectively, while Greg Ellis was cast to play a new boss character, Brian Buster Jr.

A PlayStation 4 and Windows version were released on October 17, 2019.

== Reception ==
Reception

Aggregate score
Aggregator	Score
Metacritic	NS: 67/100; PS4: 63/100

Review scores
Publication	Score
Destructoid	7/10
Electronic Gaming Monthly	8.5/10
Eurogamer	Avoid
Famitsu	33/40
Game Informer	8.25/10
GameRevolution	3/5
GameSpot	6/10
IGN	6/10
Jeuxvideo.com	15/20
Nintendo Life	8/10
Nintendo World Report	8/10
USgamer	3.5/5

Travis Strikes Again: No More Heroes received "mixed or average reviews", according to the review aggregation website Metacritic.

Several reviewers for Famitsu noted that the concept of switching between different "games" was a unique approach that offered the game a constantly refreshing sense of presentation, praising the game's ability to make the player want to keep playing in order to find out what happens next. The visuals and combat of the game were also praised for their explosive style and satisfying feedback, though a few reviewers felt that at times the combat could end up being a bit of a grind.

The Switch version of the game met internal expectations for sales, reaching 24th on the eShop best sellers chart. The PS4 version did not place in the top 30 in its week of release.
