= No More Heroes 2: Desperate Struggle =

2010 video game

- North American Wii box art
- Developer: Grasshopper Manufacture (Note: Ported to Nintendo Switch by Engine Software)
- Publishers: Wii; NA: Ubisoft; PAL: Rising Star Games; JP: Marvelous Entertainment Nintendo Switch; WW: Marvelous; NA: Xseed Games Amazon Luna; Marvelous; Windows; Marvelous; Xseed Games
- Director: Nobutaka Ichiki
- Producer: Yoshiro Kimura
- Designers: Toshihiro Fujikawa; Chihiro Suda
- Programmer: Noboru Matsuzaki
- Artists: Junya Iwata; Sho Chijimatsu
- Composers: List of composers: Jun Fukuda; Masatomo Komakine; Kazuhiro Goto; Taku Yoshioka; Tomohiro Shirai; Masahiko Hagio; Fiber Jelly; Akira Yamaoka; Ryo Watanabe
- Series: No More Heroes
- Platforms: Wii; Nintendo Switch; Windows
- Release: Wii: NA: January 26, 2010; AU: May 25, 2010; EU: May 28, 2010; JP: October 21, 2010; Nintendo Switch: WW: October 28, 2020; Amazon Luna: US: February 25, 2021; Windows: WW: June 9, 2021
- Genres: Action-adventure, hack and slash
- Mode: Single-player

No More Heroes 2: Desperate Struggle (Note: Japanese: ノーモア★ヒーローズ2 デスパレート・ストラグル, Hepburn: Nō Moa Hīrōzu Tsū Desuparēto Sutoraguru) is a 2010 action-adventure game developed by Grasshopper Manufacture for the Wii. The sequel to No More Heroes (2007), it was released by Marvelous Entertainment in Japan, Ubisoft in North America, and Rising Star Games in PAL territories in 2010. The game continues the story of professional assassin Travis Touchdown; upon discovering that a corporation's CEO placed a hit on his best friend, Travis rejoins the ranks to fight his way through an even greater number of assassins to confront his best friend's killer and attain revenge.

Desperate Struggle was the only game in the series without Goichi Suda as lead director; he was relegated to executive director, with Nobutaka Ichiki replacing him. The game received critical acclaim, with critics considering it to be superior to its predecessor. A port of the game developed by Engine Software was released for the Nintendo Switch in 2020, and for Amazon Luna and Microsoft Windows in 2021. It was followed by two sequels: Travis Strikes Again: No More Heroes (2019) and No More Heroes III (2021).

== Plot ==
The story of No More Heroes 2 is told through cutscenes following Travis' journey, interspersed with scenes of a woman at a peep show dictating the story's events to a silent, unknown observer.

Three years have passed since Travis Touchdown became the top assassin in the United Assassins Association (UAA) and walked away. He has returned to Santa Destroy and fights Skelter Helter, who seeks revenge on Travis for killing his older brother Helter Skelter prior to the first game. After winning the battle, he meets Sylvia Christel, who informs him he has taken Helter's as the 51st best assassin, and offers him a "five-course meal" in exchange for reclimbing the UAA ranks and reclaiming his former glory at Rank 1. The nearly-dead Skelter Helter interrupts them and warns Travis that he and his co-conspirators will still have their revenge before dying for good.

The same night, a group of criminals kill Travis's best friend, Bishop, and throw his head through Travis's window in a paper bag. Travis, seeking revenge, asks Sylvia to help him find the one responsible, but Sylvia tells him that the one who ordered the killing was Jasper Batt Jr., the CEO of Pizza Bat and first-ranked assassin. In the first game, Travis stopped three different attempts by Pizza Bat to expand into Santa Destroy by assassinating the CEOs. In the three years since, with Travis out of the picture, Pizza Bat successfully opened a headquarters in Santa Destroy and bought out practically every business in town. Travis resolves to climb to the ranks to get a chance for revenge on Jasper.

Travis fights and defeats Rank 50 rap star and religious fanatic Nathan Copeland. Afterwards he meets Rank 25 football star Charlie MacDonald and his cheerleaders, who transform into a giant mech called the Santa Death Parade. Travis defeats them in his own mech, the Glastonbury, built by Dr. Naomi and based on a mech from his favorite anime. He feels remorse for the cheerleaders, explaining that they were harmless, but backpedals after Sylvia offers to nullify his victory. He also spares the optional challenger (the only way to fight her is by going back to the motel after beating Charlie) Kimmy Howell, commenting that he "can't kill a co-ed". Travis also begins fighting the supernatural: facing Rank 24, the child ghost and fire starter Matt Helms, followed by Rank 23, the poisonous siren Cloe Walsh.

Sylvia organizes a battle royale with twelve assassins, including Travis. After arriving at the arena, Travis witnesses all the other contestants killed off by Rank 10 Dr. Letz Shake (who was destroyed by Henry in the first game). Letz Shake reveals to him that he has frozen Henry in carbonite as revenge before facing Travis. After he destroys Letz Shake and rescues Henry, he meets up with Shinobu, who now idolizes him and calls him "Master". At Sylvia's request, she fought and defeated Rank 9 wealthy gunslinger Million Gunman and Rank 8 cybernetic twins New Destroy Man for Travis. Shinobu advances on Travis, but he turns her away because he feels "like the pervy teacher in a porno". Rejected, she takes her leave.

Travis fights a grueling battle against Rank 7, the silent but honorable Ryuji. Travis crows triumphantly after Ryuji concedes, but Sylvia kills him in cold blood, criticizing Travis for showing mercy. Henry, suffering from hibernation sickness, fights Mimmy (a mixture of the anime girls and robots Travis watches) in a nightmare before awakening. He reconciles with Travis and kills the next three assassins for him. Travis fights Rank 4 Margaret Moonlight, a gothic Lolita, and Rank 3 Captain Vladimir, a missing cosmonaut, and convinces Sylvia not to destroy the latter's body after finally finding peace. After defeating Rank 2 ascetic Alice Twilight (or Moonlight depending on version), the penultimate assassin, he decides he is fed up with the ranked battles and the UAA. He berates Sylvia, insisting that assassins are human and that they should not have to die for entertainment like its some kind of video game. He promises to tear down the UAA after defeating Jasper. Sylvia arrives at Travis's motel room and sleeps with him for the second time, giving him the "Five course meal" damaging the motel in the process.

Travis fights his way through the Pizza Bat headquarters to meet Jasper in his office. Jasper reveals that he was seeking revenge for his father and two brothers, the previous Pizza Bat CEOs Travis killed in the first game. Henry enters and helps Travis defeat him. After defeating his second form, Jasper becomes a giant parade balloon, which Henry refuses to fight and destroys the roof with one swipe. This final form is destroyed after Travis leaps out the office and slices it in half, causing it to explode. Sylvia, riding Travis's motorcycle, catches him as he falls and drops him off at his motel.

A scene after the credits reveals that the woman at the peep show is Sylvia, who took the job after the UAA's collapse, and that Travis himself has been listening to Sylvia's story about his exploits. The two have a tearful reunion as Travis informs her that they need to return to Santa Destroy for an unknown purpose.

== Gameplay ==
The combat is similar to that of No More Heroes, with mechanics such as wrestling moves and deathblows returning. There are four beam katanas, which Travis can freely switch between in the middle of battle, each with different properties. For example, the Peony is a large and heavy sword with a wide range, and the Rose Nasty consists of two beam katanas which Travis dual-wields. There are two sections in which Shinobu and Henry are playable, both of whom have different capabilities from Travis. Shinobu can jump, and her section contains some platforming elements, while Henry has the ability of making a quick dash in all directions by using the B button on the Wii-remote.

The overworld from the first game is gone, and Travis no longer has to pay an entry fee to enter ranked battles, allowing the player to progress through the game more quickly. The minigames that Travis can do to gain money and become stronger are 8-bit style games, in genres including action, puzzle, and racing. Another feature is a "Deathmatch" mode, allowing the player to replay any of the bosses once the game has been completed.

== Development ==
Desperate Struggle was announced on October 8, 2008, where a teaser trailer for the game was shown at the Tokyo Game Show in Chiba, Japan. The trailer provides little insight to the premise of the game, other than that the player will once again take control of Travis Touchdown. Following No More Heroes' suit of pitting Travis against unique adversaries, the trailer sees Travis preparing to battle a woman fitted with a six-limbed jet pack. Travis would be fighting for revenge, and that he had also become more serious about fighting than he was in the first title. Also, similar to the first game's numerous references to popular culture, in the trailer Travis says the Terminator series' catch phrase "I'll be back!" before initiating a sequence with music similar to that of the Terminator series' scores.

Plans for a No More Heroes sequel were revealed shortly after the release of the first game, in a March 15, 2008, interview with Computer and Video Games, where Suda revealed he would be interested in producing a No More Heroes 2 for the Wii, on the condition that the game sold well enough to convince its publishers. With No More Heroes' positive reception in North America, and Martin Defries, manager of Rising Star Games who were responsible for publishing No More Heroes in Europe, raving about the sales of the first game, not only was it unlikely that Suda's intention to direct a follow-up would go unsupported, but this meant it was likely that the sequel would not be published exclusively in Japan. It was announced at TGS 2008 that Xseed Games would publish the game in North America, taking over from Ubisoft which had published the North American release of No More Heroes, while Rising Star Games would again handle the European release. Ubisoft, however, announced at E3 2009 that they would be publishing the game in North America.

Suda has stated that the game incorporates a strong theme of revenge. While he suggested the game would be more serious, he still wanted to maintain the game's sense of humor. He has also acknowledged the criticism that was made that the open world in the first game was less than satisfying, and hopes to add more detail this time around.

A port of Desperate Struggle along with the original No More Heroes was published by XSEED Games for the Nintendo Switch and released worldwide on October 28, 2020. XSEED also published ports of both games for Windows, released on June 9, 2021. An 8 minute prequel motion comic titled No More Heroes 1.5 was dubbed for the first time and released on Grasshopper Manufacturer's YouTube channel on September 26, 2021.

== Hoppers Edition ==
Contents of Hoppers Edition

Desperate Struggle was to be released in Europe in both "extreme" and mild formats, to appeal to European fans who were disappointed by the bloodless version of No More Heroes that was published in their region. However, the mild version was skipped in favor of the original edition. In 2010, Marvelous, the Japanese publisher for Desperate Struggle, also released a special "Hoppers Edition" in Japan. It included the game, a DVD movie titled No More Heroes 1.5 (which bridges the gap between the two games), a CD soundtrack, and a fan book. An erotica comic was also included when preordering this edition. The comic contained pin up artwork of female characters from the No More Heroes series, as well as short comic strips and the comic No More Loser, which expanded upon assassin Skelter Helter's backstory.

== Reception ==
Reception

Aggregate score
Aggregator	Score
Metacritic	Wii: 84/100; NS: 82/100

Review scores
Publication	Score
1Up.com	A−
Destructoid	9.5/10
Famitsu	34/40
Game Informer	8.5/10
GameSpot	8.5/10
GamesRadar+	4.5/5
GameTrailers	8.2/10
GameZone	9/10
Giant Bomb	4/5
IGN	8.8/10
Nintendo Life	9/10
Nintendo Power	9/10
Nintendo World Report	8.5/10
Official Nintendo Magazine	87%
X-Play	4/5

No More Heroes 2: Desperate Struggle received generally favourable reviews, receiving a score of 84/100 on Metacritic and GameRankings.

IGN praised the game for its quirky sense of humor, stream-lined design of the play experience, numerous pop-culture references, humorous sexual innuendo, 8-bit minigames and impressive graphics. Game Informer praised the new side-jobs and action while criticizing the repetitive voice work and occasionally rough graphics. X-Play stated that, while the navigation and minigames have improved, the story can be inconsistent in later missions and some bosses are frustrating. GameSpot called the combat system "remarkably fun and interactive" and commended the game's "excellent use of motion controls."

Jonathan Holmes of Destructoid stated "It's extremely well crafted from beginning to end, and rarely (if ever) sacrifices fun for delivering a message." GameZone's Caleb Newby stated that "Desperate Struggle is so unpredictable it's like the punch line to a parody of Japanese pop culture. Frantic and all over the map, it somehow makes it all work and gives Wii owners an amazing game for an older audience – a rare treat to find on Nintendo's console." Ray Barnholt of 1Up.com stated: "By being the high-quality, consistently enjoyable action game it wanted to be the first time around, Desperate Struggle is now a must-buy, and at the very least, finally makes the series deserving of the evangelism surrounding it."

Sales of No More Heroes 2 have been relatively poor. According to Electronic Entertainment Design and Research (EEDAR), the game sold less than 30,000 units in its first week of release in North America. Desperate Struggle debuted on the UK charts at number five during its release week in that region. The game was the thirteenth best-selling game in Japan during its release week at 11,373 copies sold. According to Famitsu sales data, the game sold just 16,838 copies by the end of 2010. This total was less than that of either the PlayStation 3 or Xbox 360 versions of No More Heroes: Heroes' Paradise, a remake of the original No More Heroes.

=== Future ===
In a 2009 interview with Kotaku, Suda51 stated he had no intentions of doing a sequel, but he had a change of heart due to the strong sales of the original. "I originally didn't want to make another No More Heroes," he said, "The game was supposed to be a one off dealio, but when the title did well, sequels do happen." Suda51 announced that No More Heroes 2: Desperate Struggle would be the last No More Heroes game on the Wii. He was quoted as saying "I think this is the last [No More Heroes] that is going to be developed on Wii. To expand [No More Heroes] to new possibilities, we need a new platform. Wii is a great platform, but we've done everything we can with it now." He has since clarified this statement, stating that he intends to continue No More Heroes on the Wii U, probably with a different protagonist. "I've finished the story for Travis [Touchdown]. It's completely finished in No More Heroes 2." Anything developed will involve "a different character, or something like that within the series."

In March 2011, Suda51 expressed his desire to create a third game in the series. After the reveal of the Wii U in June of that year, Suda51 stated that he has all sorts of ideas for a third No More Heroes for the new platform. In July 2011, Suda51 announced a new No More Heroes game exclusively for mobile phones on the DeNA service. He promises to make the game extremely violent and hopes the game will be released in the West. He also states that he hopes the game is successful since he has "over 100 concepts for mobile games." In January 2017, a new No More Heroes title was confirmed to be in development for Nintendo Switch. On August 30 during Nindies Spotlight presentation the title was announced as Travis Strikes Again: No More Heroes. A sequel to No More Heroes 2: Desperate Struggle, titled No More Heroes III, was announced at E3 2019 and released in 2021 for the Nintendo Switch.
