= No More Heroes (video game) =

2007 video game

- North American Wii box art
- Developer: Grasshopper Manufacture (Note: Ported to Nintendo Switch, Amazon Luna, and Microsoft Windows by Engine Software)
- Publishers: Wii; JP: Marvelous Entertainment; NA: Ubisoft; PAL: Rising Star Games Nintendo Switch; WW: Marvelous; NA: Xseed Games Amazon Luna; Marvelous; Windows; Marvelous; Xseed Games
- Director: Goichi Suda
- Producer: Yoshiro Kimura
- Designer: Goichi Suda
- Artist: Yūsuke Kozaki
- Writer: Goichi Suda
- Composers: Masafumi Takada; Jun Fukuda
- Series: No More Heroes
- Platforms: Wii; Nintendo Switch; Windows
- Release: Wii: JP: December 6, 2007; NA: January 22, 2008; EU: March 14, 2008; AU: March 20, 2008; Switch: WW: October 28, 2020; Amazon Luna: US: February 11, 2021; Windows: WW: June 9, 2021
- Genres: Action-adventure, hack and slash
- Mode: Single-player

No More Heroes (Note: Japanese: ノーモア★ヒーローズ, Hepburn: Nō Moa Hīrōzu) is a 2007 action-adventure game developed by Grasshopper Manufacture for the Wii. The game was directed, designed, and written by Goichi Suda, also known by his nickname Suda51, and is the first installment in the No More Heroes series. The game follows Travis Touchdown, an otaku who wins a beam katana in an auction, from which he inadvertently becomes involved in the United Assassins Association and forced to kill assassins higher in rank to prevent them from targeting him.

Gameplay takes place across linear stages with Travis killing enemies and fighting the ranked assassins using a mix of hack and slash combat with his beam katana and an assortment of pro wrestling moves, as well as the open hub town of Santa Destroy where he can take on part-time jobs, assassination contracts and other activities to earn money to upgrade equipment, purchase items or pay the necessary fee to participate in more fights under the UAA.

No More Heroes was released by Marvelous Entertainment in Japan in 2007, Ubisoft in North America and Rising Star Games in PAL territories in 2008. The game was met with generally positive reviews from critics, with its gameplay, writing and soundtrack receiving high praise, though its perceived repetitiveness was criticized. The game had a muted Japanese launch and ultimately sold 40,000 units in the region by February 2008. The title was comparatively successful in North America and Europe, and sold a further 208,000 copies in the former. No More Heroes was quickly regarded as a cult classic, remarked upon for its offbeat narrative and distinct style, as well as for its unconventional standing as one of the few mature games among the Wii's casual-oriented library.

An enhanced port of the game, titled No More Heroes: Heroes' Paradise, was released in 2010 for the PlayStation 3 and Xbox 360 with additional content in Japan. Unlike the original, the international version of the game was published by Konami, and only the PlayStation 3 version of the game was localized in English. A port of the original Wii version developed by Engine Software was later released for the Nintendo Switch in 2020, and for Amazon Luna and Windows via Steam in 2021. The game was followed by three sequels: No More Heroes 2: Desperate Struggle (2010), Travis Strikes Again: No More Heroes (2019), and No More Heroes III (2021).

== Gameplay ==
Throughout the game, the player controls the character Travis Touchdown. The game has a free roaming world, allowing Travis to move around on foot or on his modified scooter, the "Schpeltiger". Gameplay is open-ended, with the condition that the player must kill the top ten assassins to make the storyline progress. There are numerous part-time job side quests to earn money which can be spent on weapons, training sessions, clothes and video tapes. Money is also required to compete in a Ranking fight.

Control is handled through the Wii Remote and Nunchuk attachment, with the Remote controlling his weapon, the beam katana, and the Nunchuk moving Travis. Most attacks are performed using the "A" button, with certain other moves, including the "death blow" and sword lock struggles, executed by following on-screen instructions. Further, since the beam katanas run on batteries, they must be charged from time to time by pressing the "1" button on the remote and shaking it.

Travis's beam katana can also be upgraded and replaced throughout the game by visiting Dr. Naomi. While the katana does not follow the exact position of the remote, it is able to distinguish between a "high" and "low" position which varies the character stance and the attacks done. In addition to attacks with the beam katana Travis can kick and punch, and when enemies are stunned he can throw them with a number of professional wrestling maneuvers, done by manipulating both the Wii Remote and Nunchuk.

Travis has a secondary mode, "Dark Side", that is accessed when three icons line up in a slot machine after a successful death blow. In this mode, Travis gains a super powerful move depending on what symbols are lined up ranging from a speed increase to outright killing every enemy on screen instantly.

== Plot ==
The story follows Travis Touchdown, who is a stereotypical otaku – his motel room decorated with professional wrestling and anime collectibles – living in near poverty in the No More Heroes motel of the fictional town of Santa Destroy, California. After winning a beam katana in an internet auction, he runs out of money to buy video games and wrestling videos. After meeting with Sylvia Christel, he accepts a job to kill Helter Skelter, also known as "the Drifter," which earns him rank 11 by the United Assassins Association, a governing body of assassins. Realizing that he has the opportunity to make it to the top, he sets out to secure himself the coveted position of number one assassin in the UAA.

After killing the tenth ranked assassin, Sylvia reveals that if Travis stops killing, he'll eventually be targeted by other aspiring assassins. Travis, now convinced there's no way out, goes on to kill every other assassin except for number eight, Shinobu, whom he spares because he wants her to get stronger. During the 5th ranked battle he meets Henry, a mysterious Irish man who wields a beam katana similar to Travis' own.

Before meeting the top-ranked assassin, Travis calls the number he got from Sylvia's business card, but it connects him to her mother instead, who reveals that the UAA was just an elaborate con set up by Sylvia, who overheard his drunken ramblings and organized his entry so that he could finally have revenge on his former childhood love, Jeane, who murdered his parents. Travis briefly meets Dark Star, the final ranked assassin, who was then swiftly killed by Jeane. Jeane reveals in a fast-forwarded cutscene that she is his half-brother, and her mother killed herself after her father left her for his mistress, which was Travis' mother. Their father, knowing that she has nowhere to go, had sexually abused her all her life, thus forcing her to become a prostitute to survive and become a killer to get revenge on her father, thus killing their parents in front of Travis' eyes. Jeane almost killed Travis in a final clash, but Shinobu save him and he finally kills Jeane.

The game really ends with Travis being attacked by another assassin while taking a dump in his motel room before Henry saves him, and challenges him to one last fight in the motel's parking lot. It is during this fight that Henry reveals two twists: first, that he is Travis's twin brother, and second, that Sylvia is his wife (which would make her Travis' sister-in-law), and has a habit of disappearing before returning with lots of money (presumably due to conning people). Travis insinuates to Henry that he slept with Sylvia after becoming the #1 ranked assassin. Still locked in combat, the brothers discuss the nature of these revelations and their situation while they run down a long street. Finally, as the two leap towards each other for the final clash, the screen flashes and is revealed to be a painting hanging in an art gallery, where a little girl, Jeane, and her mother, Sylvia, are observing it.

The Japanese version's instruction booklet, entitled the United Assassins Association Official Manual, contains a small manga which contained much of the backstory about the UAA and Travis' first kill. This manga was not included in the North American release of the game, but is available on the official website.

=== Characters ===
Above Travis in the UAA are ten other assassins. The UAA official that provides ranks and sets up matches for the assassins is Sylvia Christel, a "mysterious" and "cold" woman who constantly flirts with Travis. Travis is aided by a weapons maker named Doctor Naomi, former pro-wrestler Thunder Ryu, and a drunk, Randall Lovikov. Naomi sells beam katanas and upgrades for them, Ryu operates a gym and trains Travis – allowing him to increase his strength, combos and health for a small fee – and Lovikov is a drunken old man who teaches new maneuvers and techniques in exchange for Lovikov balls which are scattered around the city.

== Development ==
No More Heroes, under its working title Project Heroes, was initially planned as an Xbox 360 game, until Yasuhiro Wada suggested the Wii and its unique control structure to director Goichi Suda ("Suda51"). Previously titled Heroes., Suda51 has said that No More Heroes focuses on social issues.

A number of films, actors and music have inspired Suda51's design for No More Heroes. Besides the title coming from UK punk band The Stranglers 1977 album No More Heroes, the structure of the United Assassins' Association is based on the film El Topo which features a similar, albeit smaller, ranking system. Travis Touchdown and his antics are based on Johnny Knoxville of Jackass and wrestler Josh Barnett, who also served as the persona from which the Destroyman character was created. Contrary to popular belief, Travis' weapon, the beam katana, is not based on the lightsaber from Star Wars but from the 1980s Japanese TV series Space Sheriff Gavan and 1987 film Spaceballs. Other character influences included Scarlett Johansson as the UAA's Sylvia, Ian Curtis as Travis' twin-brother Henry, Charles Bronson as assassin Dr. Peace, and Genichiro Tenryu as Travis' mentor Thunder Ryu.

The city of Santa Destroy is based on San Diego, California (though, possibly mistaken, Suda implied that he used the version of San Diego shown in Dirty Harry, which takes place entirely in San Francisco, California), with the "No More Heroes" motel inspired by a similar one from the movie Memento. The Japanese cult movie Gozu provided the basis for the in-game video store "Beef Head". Two fictional anime series, "Glastonbury" and "Bizarre Jelly", that are shown within the game were influenced by Space Runaway Ideon and Pretty Cure, respectively. Suda also noted that Grasshopper Studios also worked on the anime-based video games Samurai Champloo: Sidetracked and BLOOD+: One Night Kiss, both which inspired the development of No More Heroes, considering the three together as a "sword action trilogy".

In one interview Suda wanted to make No More Heroes "as violent, or even more violent than Manhunt 2," a game that received an AO rating from the ESRB in its original form. A trailer shown at the March 2007 Game Developers Conference featured Travis Touchdown using the beam katana to decapitate or cut enemies in half, with copious amounts of blood being spilled. Later videos featured clouds of black pixels and objects resembling coins spurting from enemies instead of blood. It was later explained that the "black clouds" version would be released in Japan, while North America would receive the game with the previously seen blood. Later, however, Suda51 decided to release the bloodless version in Europe as well. The two versions both feature common enemies eventually burning away and a fountain of coins, with or without the inclusion of blood.

Yūsuke Kozaki, who has previously designed characters for Speed Grapher, designed the characters for No More Heroes. Others on the team include costume designer Okama, who designed the OP for Densha Otoko, and weapons and mechanics designer Shigeto Koyama, who worked on Eureka Seven as an illustrator.

=== No More Heroes: Heroes' Paradise ===
On November 17, 2009, Famitsu magazine revealed that No More Heroes would receive a port to both the PlayStation 3 and Xbox 360 from the company feelplus titled No More Heroes: Heroes' Paradise. The game features new modes, revamped high-definition graphics, though it lacks motion control on the Xbox 360. Only the Xbox 360 version is uncensored, causing Computer Entertainment Rating Organization (CERO) to label the game with its adult "Z" rating. The ports were released in Japan on April 15, 2010. The PlayStation 3 version of the game was released in North America by Konami with added PlayStation Move support, instead of Ubisoft, the game's original publisher, which had stated that they would not be publishing this version in North America.

=== 2020 remaster ===
A port of the original Wii version for Nintendo Switch was simultaneously announced and released digitally for the Nintendo eShop on October 28, 2020, alongside No More Heroes 2: Desperate Struggle, during a Nintendo Direct Partner Showcase presentation featuring No More Heroes III gameplay. Both games were completely uncensored outside North America for the first time, retaining the depiction of blood and violence compared to their previous re-releases. The port was developed by Engine Software, who previously remastered Suda51's Killer7 for Windows in 2018, and was published by XSEED Games. Both No More Heroes and No More Heroes 2 for Switch were given physical releases, published and distributed by Limited Run Games on March 12, 2021. The Engine Software conversions of No More Heroes and No More Heroes 2 were both added to the Amazon Luna cloud gaming service during early access on February 11, 2021, while the former was removed on February 11, 2023. Both games were subsequently ported to Windows via Steam on June 9, 2021, and on GOG.com on June 25, 2026.

=== Music ===
No More Heroes Original Sound Tracks

Soundtrack album by Masafumi Takada and Jun Fukuda
- Released: January 23, 2008
- Genre: Video game soundtrack
- Length: Disc 1: 64:16; Disc 2: 48:13; Disc 3: 58:10
- Label: Marvelous Entertainment

The song "Heavenly Star" by Genki Rockets is used in many parts of the game. In the Japanese and PAL versions, a music video of it can be watched on Travis' television, but it was replaced with the original Heroes trailer for the game in the North American (NTSC) version. The song was no longer there in the Switch version as it was replaced by in-game music.

The three-disc No More Heroes Original Sound Tracks, featuring 71 tracks of original compositions by Masafumi Takada and Jun Fukuda, was released in Japan on January 23, 2008. A remix soundtrack, titled No More Heroes Sound Tracks: Dark Side, was later released on March 14, 2008.

The Outer Rim, a band featuring game composer Norihiko Hibino, released its self-titled debut album featuring an English drama using No More Heroes characters in a far future setting.

== Reception ==
=== Reviews ===
Reception

Aggregate score
Aggregator	Score
Metacritic	WII: 83/100; NS: 82/100

Review scores
Publication	Score
1Up.com	B
Edge	9/10
Famitsu	34/40
Game Informer	6/10
GamePro	4.5/5
GameSpot	9/10
GameSpy	4/5
GameTrailers	8.2/10
IGN	7.8/10
Nintendo Life	8/10
Nintendo Power	8.5/10
X-Play	5/5
Play Magazine	9.5/10

Overall, No More Heroes received positive reviews. The game received a 34/40 from Famitsu. GameSpot gave it an Editor's Choice Award, praising the unique story, gameplay, and sense of humor. X-Play considered the game to have "exceptional writing, sharp satire, satisfying game progression, unique visual style, intuitive controls, and a catchy and distinctive soundtrack. X-play also called it the third best game and best Wii game released in the first half of 2008". GamePro also praised No More Heroes with a Game of the Month Award and Editor's Choice award, saying "The entries for the best new character of 2008 are closed here's your winner (Travis Touchdown)" and that the game "easily ranks among the Wii's finest titles."

GameTrailers, although reviewing the game positively, found its open world to be somewhat limited, an assessment shared by IGN, who went even further, claiming it ground an otherwise exciting game to a dead halt. Despite awarding the game a less positive review than others, IGN awarded it "Game of the Month" for January, calling it a "must-play" despite its flaws. Game Informer was more critical, stating that "the repetition and lack of substance behind the flash" was among the many problems they had with the game. Nintendo Power stated that "No More Heroes's zany charm and zest for excess go a long way to make up for its weaknesses." They also listed it as the 7th best Wii game to date. Daniel Wilks of Hyper commended the game for its "very clever writing and great combat mechanics". However, he criticised it for being "deliberately repetitive".

No More Heroes won multiple Wii-specific awards from IGN in their 2008 video game awards, including Best Story and Best Action Game. It was also a nominee for several other Wii-specific IGN awards, including Best Artistic Design, Best Voice Acting, and Best New IP. GameSpot awarded No More Heroes fits 2008 original IP and Wii game awards. It was nominated for "Best Wii Game" at the 2008 Spike Video Game Awards.

=== Sales ===
For the Japanese release, a poorly attended launch event for the game was held on December 6, 2007, at Akihabara's Sofmap Amusement featuring both Suda51 and Yasuhiro Wada signing copies of the games and giving away premiums. After 20 minutes passed without any purchases, a Famitsu reporter had a copy signed while others took photos. No More Heroes sold approximately 10,000 copies on its first day of release in Japan.

Suda51 expressed disappointment in the Japanese sales of the game, saying that only Nintendo is doing well in regard to the Wii's success because of its adoption by casual gamers. He later retracted his comment, saying his "point was that No More Heroes, unlike a lot of Nintendo Wii titles currently available is the kind of product which will attract a different kind of consumer to the hardware, i.e. gamers who are looking for a different genre to the products which have been successful on this platform thus far."

By February 15, 2008, No More Heroes had sold 40,000 copies in Japan. The game saw shipments of 200,000 units in North America with about 100,000 of those units sold within the first five weeks. By January 2009, the game had sold 208,000 copies in USA. No More Heroes was expected to sell 160,000 copies in Europe. Shortly after No More Heroes's European release, PAL publisher Rising Star raved about its sales, with manager Martin Defries proclaiming, "We are weeping with delight. Especially as sales should improve further with the TV campaign moving up a gear from tonight. It is a verification of all the posturing and ambitious claims made these past months. I think a 'told you so' would be apt at some point. Thanks to Nintendo and the Wii console. Thanks to Mastertronic for their sales efforts and all our retail partners. Most of all thanks to Grasshopper for the greatest of products."

Sales for the Japanese launch of No More Heroes: Heroes' Paradise were combined slightly better than with the original Wii version. The PlayStation 3 version of the game sold 16,000 units in its first week on sale in the country.

Marvelous stated the Switch ports of No More Heroes and its sequel had seen "strong sales" in North America and Europe.

=== Sequels and legacy ===
A 2010 sequel named No More Heroes 2: Desperate Struggle has been developed by Grasshopper Manufacture and published by Ubisoft in the U.S. on January 26, 2010, and was released in Europe for the Wii by Rising Star Games on May 28, 2010. The Japanese version was released on October 21, 2010.

A new game in the series, Travis Strikes Again: No More Heroes, was first hinted at during the initial reveal of the Switch in January 2017, and fully revealed in a Nintendo Direct presentation the following August. Grasshopper Manufacture teamed with several other indie developers for the title, which sees Travis and Badman, Bad Girl's vengeful father, being transported into the demonic "Death Drive MK-II" video game console where they must fight boss battles within the games. It was released on January 18, 2019, for the Nintendo Switch and was later ported to the PlayStation 4 and Windows on October 17, 2019.

A new installment, No More Heroes III, was announced at E3 2019 to be released in 2020 exclusively for the Nintendo Switch. On September 10, 2020, director Goichi Suda announced that the game would be delayed until 2021, citing disruption to development caused by the COVID-19 pandemic. The game was released for Switch in August 2021, and for PlayStation 4, PlayStation 5, Windows, Xbox One, and Xbox Series X/S in October 2022.

In 2018, it was reported that Suda was in talks with Marvelous Entertainment to bring No More Heroes and No More Heroes 2: Desperate Struggle to the Nintendo Switch. The ports were later announced in a Nintendo Partner Showcase video on October 28, 2020, and released the same day.
