= No More Heroes III =

2021 video game

- Original Nintendo Switch cover art by comic artist Darick Robertson featuring FU and Travis Touchdown
- Developer: Grasshopper Manufacture (Note: PS4, Xbox One and Microsoft Windows versions developed by Bee Tribe Digital Studio; PS5 and Xbox Series X/S versions developed by Muteki Games Collective.)
- Publishers: JP: Marvelous; WW: Grasshopper Manufacture (Switch); NA: Xseed Games (PlayStation, Xbox, PC)
- Directors: Goichi Suda; Ren Yamazaki
- Producers: Kazuyuki Kumagai; Goichi Suda
- Programmer: Toru Hironaka
- Artists: Kunihiko Taniwaki; Masanori Ushiki; Yusuke Kozaki
- Writer: Goichi Suda
- Composers: Nobuaki Kaneko; Jun Fukuda; Kazuhiro Abo
- Series: No More Heroes
- Engine: Unreal Engine 4
- Platforms: Nintendo Switch; PlayStation 4; PlayStation 5; Xbox One; Xbox Series X/S; Windows
- Release: Nintendo Switch: WW: August 27, 2021; PS4, PS5, Xbox One, Series X/S: JP: October 6, 2022; NA: October 11, 2022; EU: October 14, 2022; Windows: WW: October 11, 2022
- Genres: Action-adventure, hack and slash
- Mode: Single-player

No More Heroes III (Note: Japanese: ノーモア★ヒーローズIII, Hepburn: Nō Moa Hīrōzu Surī) is a 2021 action-adventure game developed and published by Grasshopper Manufacture for the Nintendo Switch. Marvelous published the game in Japan. It is the fourth installment in the No More Heroes series and is the third mainline entry in the series. Set eleven years after the events of No More Heroes 2: Desperate Struggle (2010), the game stars professional assassin Travis Touchdown and follows his return to the fictional city of Santa Destroy, as he must defend the world from a powerful army of alien invaders led by the galactic overlord prince FU and his nine soldiers who adopt the façade of galactic superheroes.

Production began during the final development stages of the spinoff prequel Travis Strikes Again: No More Heroes (2019). Series creator and director Goichi Suda had received many fan requests to make a third mainline entry in the franchise after the release of the second game, but development of a new entry was postponed for many years due to Grasshopper Manufacture working on other projects. Upon the studio being shown the Nintendo Switch, Suda was inspired to return to the series, believing the games would be a fit for the console's audience and allow for a return to the series' staple motion control combat via the Joy-Con controllers. Much like previous entries in the series, the game pays homage to and parodies pop culture media, taking inspiration from works such as Rocky III, Kamen Rider, the Marvel Cinematic Universe, and the filmography of Takashi Miike. Suda has described the game as the conclusion of Travis Touchdown's story.

No More Heroes III was announced at E3 2019 with a planned 2020 release, but was delayed into 2021 due to the COVID-19 pandemic slowing down development. Upon its initial Nintendo Switch release on August 27, 2021, the game was met with generally favorable reviews. Additional versions of the game with enhanced visuals and performance were released in October 2022 for PlayStation, Xbox, and Windows platforms, published by Marvelous in Japan and Xseed Games in North America.

== Gameplay ==
Travis Touchdown fighting one of the game's bosses, Mr. Blackhole. Particles from successful attacks funnel into the Tension Gauge seen in the bottom right corner.

No More Heroes III is a third-person action-adventure game where the player assumes the role of the professional assassin Travis Touchdown, who must climb to the top of the Galactic Superhero Rankings. The game marks a return to the series' open world format last seen in the first game and has the player explore a man-made archipelago, taking on various side activities such as part-time job minigames, and defense missions where the player must battle waves of enemies. In a new addition to the series, the open world is split into five unique islands. The player can traverse around and between the islands with Travis' new modified motorcycle; the "Demzamtiger". Travel between islands can also be expedited via a fast travel system. To progress in the game, the player must accrue enough money from missions to pay an entry-fee to a ranked battle. The player must then face off against one of the Rankings' top contenders in a unique boss battle.

Combat plays out as a hack-and-slash game in real-time. Similar to the previous mainline games, the combat is predominantly centered around Travis' signature "Beam Katana"; a sword with a blade composed of energy. The player can perform various light and heavy combos with the sword. Successful strikes power up the player's "Tension Gauge" whereas taking damage depletes it, higher tension leads to longer and more damaging combos. When an enemy has had their health sufficiently depleted, the player is given a directional prompt to execute a "Killer Slash"; an unstoppable attack with large range that does heavy damage to adjacent enemies. Upon successful execution of enemies, the player activates the "Slash Reel"; a slot machine which gives the random chance of a currency bonus or a power-up. At times the player may lock swords with melee-based enemies, upon which they must perform rotation motions to counter the enemy.

The Beam Katana runs on power represented by a battery that gets depleted during attacks. When fully exhausted, the player is left vulnerable and must manually recharge it. The player is able to perform a variety of professional-wrestling techniques on stunned or diverted enemies to deal greater damage and instantly recharge the Beam Katana's battery. Defensive maneuvers exist in the form of blocking and dodging. Dodging an oncoming attack right before it connects initiates a Perfect Dodge, causing enemies to enter a slow-motion state and leaving them susceptible to a flurry of attacks. If the player falls in battle, they are given a random chance of a stat boost upon retrying.

New additions to the series' staple combat mechanics include the "Death Glove" carried over from Travis Strikes Again: No More Heroes. The Death Glove allows the player to perform a teleporting dropkick. An additional three unique skills are obtained that can aid in combat, which include the ability to perform psychokinetic throws, the ability to set up a sentry that automatically fire projectiles at enemies in a radius, and the ability to set down a field that slows down enemies within the radius. All skills operate on a cooldown timer. If the player rolls a jackpot on the Slash Reel (represented by a triple seven) the player is able to activate one of two "Full Armor" modes, which boost the player's attack options and allows them to fire projectiles. A third form of the Full Armor is employed for shooting defense missions, a new side activity which take the form of shoot 'em up mecha battles where the player must defend the planet from large scale aliens.

The player can return to Travis' motel in between missions to upgrade various stats such as their health and weaponry. Unlike previous entries in the series, character upgrades employ a separate currency from the one that is used to purchase items and enter ranked battles. Scrap parts derived from battle missions can be sold off for additional currency or used at the motel to construct Death Glove chips that provide various unique stat modifiers, and the player can also order consumable items in the form of sushi that give players stat boosts in battle, such as increased damage or cooldown reduction on Death Glove abilities. At the motel, the player can also play minigames with Travis' cat, customize his wearable attire, collect capsule toys from a gashapon machine, engage in a combat tutorial room, or use a time machine to revisit past bosses.

== Story ==
=== Setting ===
No More Heroes III takes place in a contemporary setting and is mainly set in the fictional location of Santa Destroy, California; a seedy small town bordering Mexico which has served as the central setting of the series. Since the events of the previous entries the town has undergone urban redevelopment, with high-rise apartment complexes and businesses having spread throughout the town. The redevelopment brought a shift in economy and the construction of an adjacent man-made archipelago collectively named Utopiland. The entire island group is controlled by the megacorporation Utopinia, which has its headquarters stationed in the centermost island at Damon Tower. Alongside Santa Destroy, the neighboring islands of Utopiland consist of Perfect World, a peaceful Americana-influenced suburb; Thunderdome, a salt pan wasteland featuring a Japantown-styled red light district; Call of Battle, a war-torn battlefield; and Neo Brazil, a futuristic cityscape.

=== Characters ===
Travis Touchdown returns to the role as protagonist, a presently 39-year old otaku and hitman who describes himself as a passing assassin. He takes residence in Santa Destroy as an occupant of the titular No More Heroes motel, living together with his pet cat Jeane who also serves as Travis' navigator. The main antagonist of the game is FU, an alien prince who is royally recognized on his home planet as Jess-Baptiste VI. His companions consist of the strongest aliens from other planets that FU has conquered and make up the Galactic Superhero Rankings. From lowest to highest in ranking they consist of Mr. Blackhole, a wormhole bandit; Gold Joe, a space-ore dealer; Black Night Direction, an alien kidnapper; Vanishing Point, a memory thief; Velvet Chair Girl, a "gastro cannon"; Midori Midorikawa, a dark-world princess; Sniping Lee, a galactic sniper champion; Sonic Juice, a demon god; and Paradox Bandit, an explosions master.

Returning characters from old games include Sylvia Christel, Travis' wife and secretary for Utopinia, who helps set up the ranked battles for Travis. Shinobu Jacobs, Bad Girl, and Dr. Naomi return as Travis' allies, who have taken residence in the No More Heroes motel. Characters that return from Travis Strikes Again: No More Heroes include Badman, a reluctant ally to Travis and father of Bad Girl; Dr. Juvenile, Naomi's sister and former adversary of Travis who has now become a virtual companion; Bishop, a close friend of Travis' who owns a video game store; Kamui Uehara, an observer and friend of Travis' with mysterious powers; and Damon Ricotello, FU's childhood friend and the CEO of Utopinia who has personal history with Travis. Among new characters are Native Dancer, a mysterious assassin claiming to be from the future; and Notorious, a masked wrestling champion who is also a superhero.

=== Plot ===
In 2001, a young Damon Ricotello discovers a crash site in the woods, encountering FU as a small injured alien larva. Damon decides to take care of FU while hiding him from government agents. The two become friends while searching for a way to return FU to his planet. After discovering a piece of alien technology left at FU's crash site, Damon is imbued with alien powers and assists FU in building a space ship. They say goodbye to each other and FU departs, promising to return in 20 years.

Twenty years later (two years after the events of Travis Strikes Again), an adult Damon manages Utopinia as its CEO, utilizing FU's alien abilities and technology to prosper and become a wealthy business magnate. An adult FU returns to Earth in a large spaceship, alongside nine additional aliens, and reveals to Damon that he became a prince after returning to his home world, only to be exiled to an intergalactic prison for destroying a neighboring planet. He announces their intention to team up with Damon and take over Earth by employing the popular trend of superheroism. Travis Touchdown, who had returned to Santa Destroy following years of self-imposed exile, awakes to the city being invaded and fends off waves of aliens together with fellow assassins Shinobu and Bad Girl. He successfully stops the invasion by killing its commander Mr. Blackhole, the first of FU's companions.

After executing the President of the United States on live television, FU announces the establishment of the Galactic Superhero Rankings; a ranked ladder with himself at the top, serving as an open invitation to the strongest fighters to determine the fate of the planet. Still aggrieved by Blackhole's death, FU accosts Travis and his friends at the No More Heroes motel. In the ensuing skirmish, FU incapacitates Travis before dismembering Shinobu and killing Badman when he arrived to her aid. The battle leaves Shinobu in a coma and Bad Girl devastated over her father's death, compelling Travis to enter the rankings to fight his way to number one and stop FU. During Travis' ascent, the rankings are infiltrated by Native Dancer, who prematurely kills Black Night Direction. He grants Travis new Death Glove abilities, and is instinctually spared by Travis after they battle. Travis later crosses paths with a grown-up Kimmy Howell after she is found having killed Vanishing Point, still seeking a fight to the death with Travis following their previous encounter in Desperate Struggle. Expressing remorse over having to fight a non-ranking opponent, Travis kills her in the ensuing battle.

Travis spares the life of the fifth ranked fighter Midori Midorikawa after they are intercepted by Kamui Uehara, who reveals that she joined the rankings after a misunderstanding and that the two are in a relationship. During a battle with mass-produced versions of the superhero terrorist Destroyman, Travis befriends the superhero and wrestling champion Notorious, who assists Travis in training. Becoming increasingly frustrated by their inefficiency, FU kills off the two remaining rankers so Travis can face him. After making his way to the second rank, Travis is waylaid at the motel by his brother Henry Cooldown, who has been indoctrinated into a cult of knights. Revealing his resentment of Travis over events surrounding their shared traumatic upbringing, he challenges Travis to a battle to the death. After Travis defeats and seemingly kills Henry, he is ambushed and murdered by Henry while using the toilet.

After dying, Travis is sent to the world of Deathman, a video game that he grew up with, whose protagonist brings Travis back to life with help from Takashi Miike. Joined by the recovered Shinobu and Bad Girl alongside Kamui, Notorious, Midori, and Native Dancer, Travis heads to Damon Tower to fight FU, forcing him back to his larval form with everyone's efforts. FU attempts to flee back to his planet, only for Damon to detonate FU's ship, killing FU in the process. Damon reveals that FU was only a pawn and that he himself masterminded the alien invasion as part of his plan to kill Travis, who had assaulted Damon during the events of Travis Strikes Again: No More Heroes as an act of retaliation for Damon's history of abuse toward Dr. Juvenile. Damon transforms Damon Tower into a planet destroying mecha, but Travis successfully defeats it after summoning an Arsenal from Daemon X Machina. Travis and Damon finish their fight on a derelict battlefield in the style of Super Smash Bros., where Travis disintegrates Damon.

In a post-credits scene, Travis and his friends give Badman a burial at sea before they are attacked by an alien armada led by FU's father, King Jess-Baptiste V. They are saved by future versions of Travis and Sylvia's children Jeane and Hunter, who also reveal Native Dancer to be Travis' grandson Scott. The trio explain that Henry kills Travis in the future and teams up with an alien force to destroy the planet, and ask Travis to join them to help them change the future.

== Development ==
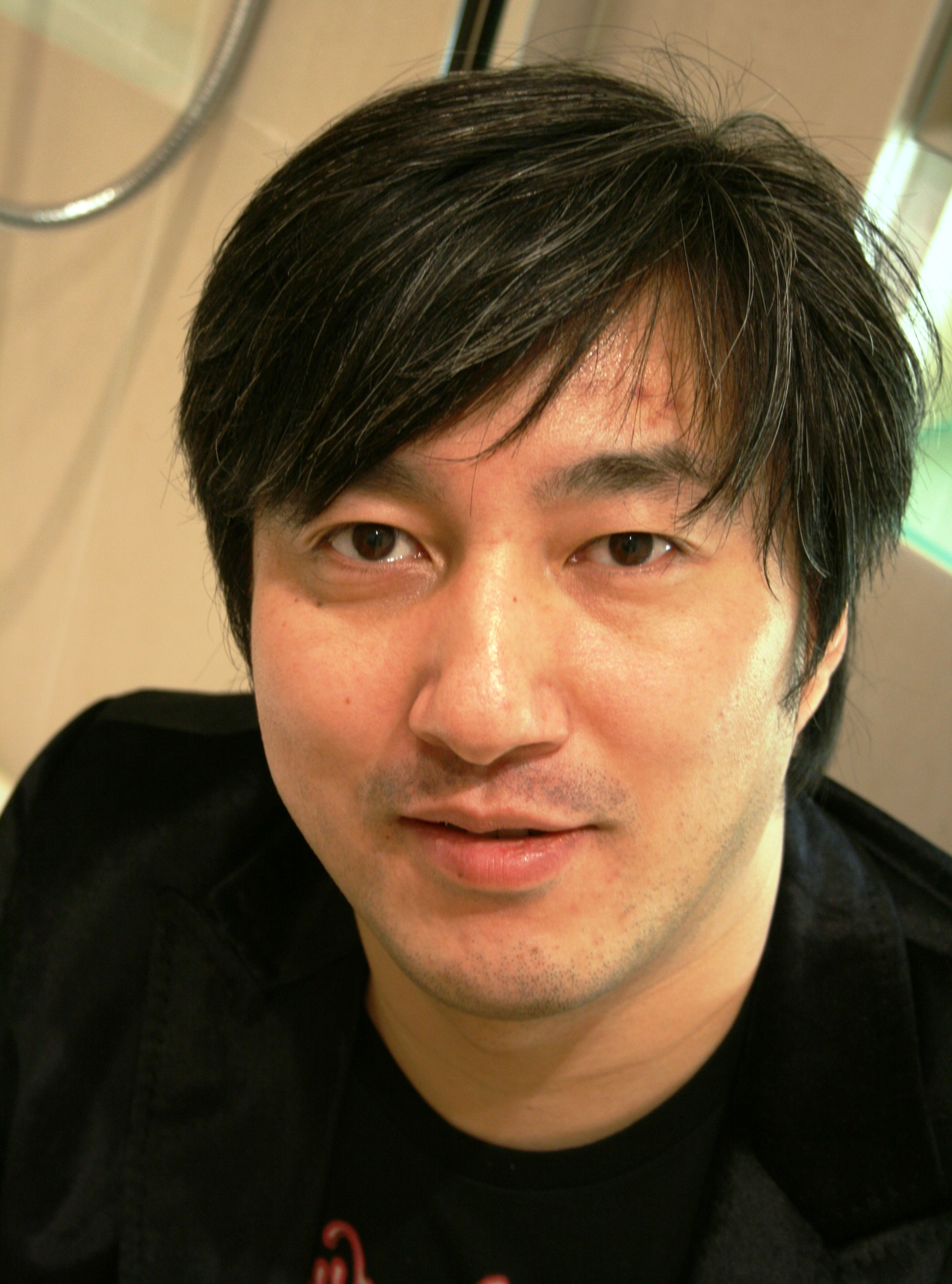
No More Heroes III and Travis Strikes Again: No More Heroes both mark Goichi Suda's return to the role of game designer and director in over a decade.

Development of No More Heroes III began in early 2019. Prior to the game's development, Grasshopper Manufacture developed and released Travis Strikes Again: No More Heroes, which was Goichi Suda's first title in a directorial role since the original No More Heroes game. While the title was made in part as a tribute to indie games, Suda had expressed long-term intentions for the title to be a stepping stone on the path to a proper numbered entry. The ending of Travis Strikes Again: No More Heroes included a playable portion where Travis Touchdown was controlled in third-person, similarly to previous No More Heroes titles, with a comment from Travis suggesting that development on a mainline sequel had properly commenced. Suda explained in an interview following the release of the game that the playable segment was a prototype they used in development, and that the intention behind its inclusion was to evoke a similar feeling that viewers get from the post-credits teasers in Marvel Cinematic Universe movies. Suda also confirmed that he would be attending that year's E3, and suggested he would be making an announcement at the event.

During the lead-up to Travis Strikes Again's release, Suda detailed an outline for No More Heroes III and expressed his desire to feature assassin battles at a scale similar to that of The Avengers, comparing the game's adversaries to the supervillain Thanos. He also explained that the Death Glove from Travis Strikes Again would carry over into the new game, as its original purposed implementation was to make Travis' skills more distinct as a video game protagonist, and to bolster his ability to contend with the greater enemies planned for No More Heroes III. The reveal trailer for the game shows Travis battling an invading alien armada and using the Death Glove to don powered armor, utilizing the signature catchphrase of Kamen Rider. Travis is once again voiced by Robin Atkin Downes, while Paula Tiso reprises her role as Sylvia Christel, Travis' wife who has abandoned the assassin world and is now an internet celebrity and influencer. At the time of reveal, Suda wouldn't confirm whether series mainstay Shinobu Jacobs would return, though he stressed that he wanted Kimberly Brooks to reprise the role in the event that she does.

While Yūsuke Kozaki returns to the game as lead character designer, No More Heroes III features a range of character guest designers such as pop illustrator Masanori Ushiki, who is responsible for designing the game's alien cast of characters. Suda would confirm that Kimmy Howell from No More Heroes 2: Desperate Struggle would be returning and had been redesigned by Ōkami and Bayonetta character designer Mari Shimazaki. It was also confirmed that series recurring boss character Destroyman would make a return in multiple variations, designed by Skan Srisuwan of Studio HIVE. Travis' twin brother and rival Henry Cooldown appears in the game redesigned by The Silver Case and Flower, Sun, and Rain illustrator Takashi Miyamoto; and is voiced by Mark Allan Stewart, having been recast after previously being portrayed by Quinton Flynn. Kamui Uehara from The 25th Ward: The Silver Case and Travis Strikes Again appears in the game as NT Kamui, redesigned by Goodnight Punpun writer and illustrator Inio Asano. Asano also designed the video game incarnation of Midori Midorikawa, a guest character who first made her debut in a spinoff manga for The 25th Ward: The Silver Case and who appears in No More Heroes III as one of the game's boss characters. Asano, who had met the series' lead character designer Yūsuke Kozaki at his sister's wedding, had expressed interest in working on video games, and was offered a guest designer role by Kozaki for No More Heroes III. A new character introduced in the game is a mysterious ninja named Native Dancer, designed by Borderlands series art director Scott Kester

The core development team of No More Heroes III consisted of the same team that developed Travis Strikes Again: No More Heroes, and was additionally supported by the recruitment of external talent and former Grasshopper Manufacture staff, rounding out the development team at roughly 100 people. Unreal Engine 4 was used again as the development engine. Suda assumed the role of director, writer and designer, with Ren Yamazaki and Nobutaka Ichiki — co-director of Travis Strikes Again: No More Heroes and lead director of No More Heroes 2: Desperate Struggle respectively — returning to the franchise as co-directors. While confirming that the game would be playable on traditional controllers, Suda stated that the game was heavily designed around the Joy-Con's motion control capabilities, both in and out of combat. He also confirmed that the open world, which was absent from No More Heroes 2: Desperate Struggle, was expected to make a return, along with side activities.

As of November 2019, the game was estimated to be 35-45% complete. In detailing the open world, Suda emphasized that the size of the open world would be modest compared to productions by larger scale studios such as Ubisoft and Rockstar Games, though he also confirmed that while the game's budget isn't the biggest a Grasshopper Manufacture game has had, it is the biggest No More Heroes game in terms of scope and design. Suda also expressed intentions of providing extra side activities that would be something "greater [and] different than your standard minigame." Compared to Travis Strikes Again: No More Heroes which was largely designed around Suda wishing to commemorate indie games and Grasshopper Manufacture's history, the development team designed No More Heroes III heavily around fan feedback and what they believe fans look for in a No More Heroes game.

"[...] it's time to say goodbye to Travis, this is his final battle, and I meant it sort of literally, it's time to say goodbye. I don't want to split up with him, but we kind of have no choice as the time has come. Not that Marvelous forced us, it's just that I felt that it's really time for us to go on and do our own thing."

— Goichi Suda

Due to the rights of the No More Heroes series primarily belonging to Marvelous, Grasshopper Manufacture had to receive special permission to work on Travis Strikes Again: No More Heroes, as well as No More Heroes III. Suda stressed that Marvelous were encouraging and co-operative of the development of the two games, but also expressed the need to build Grasshopper Manufacture's future on the back of brand new IP that they have full control over. Because of these factors, No More Heroes III was made with the intent to serve as the foreseeable conclusion to the series, and Suda would describe the game as Travis Touchdown's final battle. Despite this, Suda expressed hopes of seeing the character of Travis again, and hasn't ruled out the possibility of returning to the series in the future.

=== Music ===
The soundtrack of the game is primarily written and produced by Nobuaki Kaneko, drummer of Japanese alternative metal band Rize. While having had experience composing music for film before, No More Heroes III is his first time making music for a video game, and described the experience as requiring a different mindset, having to emphasize consistent tension and making sure tracks can loop. The process would involve sending Suda a variety of different tracks, and letting him decide if they are suited for any of the game's specific moments.

The experience making music for the game inspired Kaneko to create his own band; Red Orca. The band's debut single "Orca Force", which released October 2019, was originally made for No More Heroes III, and an alternate version of the track called "Dead Orca Force" is featured in the game as a boss track. Grasshopper's sound producer, Jun Fukuda, supervised the overall soundtrack and composed several tracks.

Kazuhiro Abo, lead composer of Travis Strikes Again: No More Heroes, is credited as sound composer and provided additional music contributions for the game. Additional guest composers include Tony Astro, Natsu Fuji, Baku Furukawa, SEKITOVA, and the hip hop group Okumura who collaborated with Abo on the game's sushi song. When it comes to choosing the composers for the upcoming game, Abo stated that he looks into a passionate composer with a nice personality who can make unique tracks with great quality, rather than based on their fame.

== Release ==
No More Heroes III was announced at E3 2019 as part of the Nintendo Direct showcase, featuring a reveal trailer of Travis battling alien invaders. Leading up to the reveal Suda advised people to tune into E3, tweeting concept art of FU and new versions of the Santa Destroy insignia, one which served as a homage to the Joy Division album Unknown Pleasures. A new story trailer, which started out as a fake title called Goddamn Superhero, premiered at The Game Awards 2019, with CG co-production by animation studios Shirogumi and Kamikaze Douga. During the 2020 New Game Plus Expo event, Suda humorously presented new gameplay combat footage of No More Heroes III partially obscured by his superimposed body giving out a mock interview unrelated to the upcoming title, discussing his plans to play other Nintendo Switch games during the COVID-19 pandemic quarantine.

On September 9, 2020, the game was delayed to 2021 due to the effects that the COVID-19 pandemic had on game development. Darick Robertson, the illustrator best known for comics such as The Boys and Transmetropolitan, was announced to be providing illustrations to promote the game, including the game's cover artwork. No More Heroes III headlined the Nintendo Direct Mini Partners Showcase on October 28, 2020, which showed off an unobscured representation of gameplay, as well as confirming the return of Badman from Travis Strikes Again: No More Heroes, and Shinobu Jacobs. The trailer was followed by the announcement of ports of No More Heroes and No More Heroes 2: Desperate Struggle that would release the same day for the Nintendo Switch.

The game was featured on the February 2021 Nintendo Direct showcase, showing new footage of bosses and the return of side missions, as well as confirming the game's release date. A selection of the game's main cast and voice actors was confirmed at this time, including the return of Bad Girl and Henry Cooldown. Marvelous, who are publishing the game in Japan, announced a No More Heroes III dedicated livestream event for April 8, 2021, hosted by Suda, Mafia Kajita, and Shishiro Botan. Several side missions, locales and cutscenes were previewed during the event, and a new series digest trailer premiered which recapped the story and showed updated game play. A Japan-exclusive "Killion Dollar Trilogy" was also announced which bundles all three No More Heroes games with packaging art by Yusuke Kozaki, the Japanese website was updated to feature new game play details, and retailer exclusive purchase bonuses were confirmed, including exclusive in-game shirt designs. During E3 2021, the game was demoed live for the first time using an early build of the game in a 25-minute segment as part of Nintendo's Treehouse presentation. The demo showed off multiple parts of the game including combat with regular enemies, playing with Travis' cat, Jeane, upgrades and a boss fight with Gold Joe. In game t-shirts utilizing save data from previous entries were also announced.

The game was released for Nintendo Switch worldwide on August 27, 2021. Nintendo helped with distributing physical copies, as with Travis Strikes Again.

=== Ports ===
On April 15, 2022, Xseed Games announced that they would be publishing the game for PlayStation 4, PlayStation 5, Xbox One, Xbox Series X/S, and Windows in Fall of 2022, alongside a physical "Day 1 Edition" on consoles, featuring a 70 page art book, a soundtrack CD with select tracks from the game, and a Santa Destroy commemorative biker license plate. On April 18, 2022, pre-orders were opened for the physical editions, with a tentative release date of October 4, 2022. In Japan, No More Heroes III was released for PlayStation and Xbox consoles on October 6, 2022. Prior to launch, publisher Marvelous confirmed that the game would feature enhanced graphics, running at 4K resolution and 60 FPS on PlayStation 5 and Xbox Series X/S. The game would also receive a Japanese dub, with the audio being added to the Nintendo Switch version as a free update on October 5.

== Reception ==
Reception

Aggregate score
| Aggregator | Score |
|---|---|
| Metacritic | NS: 75/100; PS5: 71/100; XSXS: 77/100 |

Review scores
| Publication | Score |
|---|---|
| Destructoid | 8.5/10 |
| Easy Allies | 9/10 |
| Electronic Gaming Monthly | 4/5 |
| Eurogamer | Recommended |
| Game Informer | 7.75/10 |
| GameSpot | 4/10 |
| IGN | 6/10 |
| Nintendo Life | 8/10 |
| Nintendo World Report | 6.5/10 |
| Push Square | 7/10 |
| Shacknews | 7/10 |
| The Guardian | 3/5 |
| VideoGamer.com | 7/10 |

No More Heroes 3 received "generally favorable" reviews for Nintendo Switch and Xbox Series X/S, according to review aggregator platform Metacritic; the PlayStation 5 received "mixed or average" reviews.

In a positive review, Ian Walker of Kotaku wrote "more than establishing a core meaning or truth to cut through the absurdity of reality, No More Heroes 3 is all about imparting a feeling. Those emotions, by design, will be different for everyone who takes the Jodorowsky-like pill Grasshopper has manufactured into the form of a video game."

According to Famitsu, the game ranked #9 in Japan on launch week, selling 7,951 copies and becoming the second best-selling new release behind Tsukihime -A piece of blue glass moon-. The game also debuted at #4 on the weekly sales chart in South Korea, according to Media Create.
