= Michigan: Report from Hell =

2004 video game

- European box art
- Developer: Grasshopper Manufacture
- Publishers: JP: Spike; EU: 505 GameStreet
- Director: Akira Ueda
- Producers: Maki Kimura; Yasu Iizuka; Goichi Suda
- Programmer: Tetsuya Nakazawa
- Artists: Tatsuji Fujita; Katsuyoshi Fukamachi
- Writers: Nobuhiko Sagara; Ren Yamazaki
- Composers: Masafumi Takada; Jun Fukuda
- Platform: PlayStation 2
- Release: JP: 5 August 2004; EU: 30 September 2005
- Genres: Adventure; Survival horror
- Mode: Single-player

Michigan: Report from Hell (Note: Known in Japan as Michigan (Japanese: ミシガン, Hepburn: Mishigan).) is a video game developed by Grasshopper Manufacture. It was published in Japan by Spike in 2004, and in Europe by 505 GameStreet the following year. Alternately described as adventure and survival horror, the game follows a news crew investigating Chicago after a mist covers the city following a plane crash in Lake Michigan. Gameplay features the player as a cameraman guiding the reporter through different scenarios, with the ending influenced by what the player captures on film.

The game was developed during a period when Grasshopper Manufacture was staying in business through contract work. Company founder Goichi Suda created the initial concept, and acted as a producer. The director was Akira Ueda, while the music was composed by Masafumi Takada. The Japanese version included promotional material featuring Taiwanese model Yinling. The game was not released in North America due to its minimal gameplay. Michigan: Report from Hell saw generally mixed reviews, with several Western journalists noting its unique premise but faulting its gameplay and presentation.

== Gameplay ==
Gameplay of Michigan: Report from Hell; the player, as cameraman, can direct the characters and focus on different objects.

Michigan: Report from Hell is a video game—alternately described as adventure in Japan, and survival horror in Western reports—where players take on the role of a television crew cameraman. The game is split into levels dubbed "Scenarios", with the player able to save between each scenario. The player, as the cameraman, is limited in interaction to moving through the city streets and building interiors, focusing the camera on different in-game elements, giving instructions to the reporter, solving puzzles found during exploration, and kicking objects such as doors. Some enemies can be killed by solving an environmental puzzle, while others must be avoided by sending warnings to the reporter.

The reporter can die during a level, which skips a section of the game and replaces them with one of seven other reporters. The cameraman has a limited amount of film for each level, which is used to capture different elements or scenes. These scenes fills up different points related to "Suspense", "Erotic" and "Immoral", with the final point total for each altering the ending. The game ends if the cameraman is killed, or the camera runs out of film, forcing the player to restart from the beginning of a scenario.

== Synopsis ==
After a plane crashes into Lake Michigan, a fog covers the nearby city of Chicago. Media company ZakaTV sends in a crew to cover the incident; lead reporter Pamela Martel, a rookie cameraman, and sound engineer Brisco. Upon arrival, the crew is attacked by monstrous creatures that have killed most of the city's population. Pamela is soon killed and reanimated as a monster. Joined by a new reporter, the crew learns that the fog and monsters were created by a virus designed by unhinged scientist Dr. O'Conner. Intended as a weapon against enemies of the United States, and developed in collusion with ZakaTV, the virus escaped containment following the plane crash and infected the city's population. The group finds O'Conner, who transforms willingly after revealing the existence of a vaccine in the city.

Failing to find the vaccine, the crew attempts to escape via an airport, running into a mentally-impaired man who is revealed to be O'Conner's initial test subject for the virus. Upon being killed, the fog vanishes and the rest of the monsters die. On orders from the military, the crew reaches a lighthouse evacuation point, but before they are rescued Brisco mutates into a monster and kills himself to keep them safe. The ending shows the cameraman making a final video; in three endings he tries to reveal the truth behind the incident and is shot by an unseen assassin, while in a fourth he is corrupted and claims responsibility for the disaster. Secret movies found through the game reveal potential reporter Paula Orton as the assassin, silencing anyone who uncovers ZakaTV's involvement.

== Development ==
Michigan was developed by Grasshopper Manufacture, then known for their work on The Silver Case and Flower, Sun, and Rain. During the early 2000s, Grasshopper Manufacture undertook contract work for other publishers to stay solvent during a difficult period, with Michigan being one of those projects. Spike's president Mitsutoshi Sakurai contacted company founder Goichi Suda about working together on a game project. Suda created a game concept around the theme of "mist", taking inspiration from Stephen King's The Mist. Initially planned to be a game where players explored a mist-covered Chicago and with the mist itself being the threat, the team were unable to make it work, and during a meeting Suda and Sakurai reworked the design. This reworking resulted in the inclusion of monsters to make the game more frightening, and the mechanic of guiding a female reporter as a cameraman.

Due to his commitment directing Killer7, he worked on Michigan as an uncredited producer; the credited co-producers were Maki Kimura and Yasu Iizuka of Spike. The director was Akira Ueda, who had previously directed Shining Soul and its sequel Shining Soul II. The scenario was co-written by Nobuhiko Sagara and Ren Yamazaki, who worked on later Grasshopper Manufacture projects including the No More Heroes series. The staff included main programmer Tetsuya Nakazawa, art director Tatsuji Fujita, and character designer Katsuyoshi Fukamachi. The music was co-composed by Masafumi Takada and Jun Fukuda in their first collaboration, going on to work on Killer7. Suda remembered production as difficult and having "twists and turns". Morality was described as a core gameplay theme, with the team wanting the player's moral choices to alter the game's outcome. Michigan is one of the few Grasshopper Manufacture games to include horror, as Suda is not a fan of the genre. Speaking in 2018, Suda felt the company was too inexperienced to properly realise his design goals.

== Release ==
Michigan was announced in January 2004. The Japanese version included promotional material featuring Taiwanese model Yinling, with New Game Plus content featuring Yinling as an in-game character. The game was released in Japan on 5 August the same year, titled Michigan. A strategy guide was published by SoftBank Creative on 16 August, and a soundtrack album was published by Scitron Digital Contents on 20 October.

Michigan was released in Europe, something that Suda was not aware of initially. The game was published in the region by 505 GameStreet on 30 September 2005 as Michigan: Report from Hell. It was dubbed into English, and featured subtitles in English, French, Spanish, Italian and German. The European release cut Yinling's content, and had a number of bugs. In an interview with Suda for Gamasutra, journalist Brandon Sheffield revealed he had proposed a North American release to a publisher, and been told that Sony's North American branch blocked it due to its minimal gameplay content. Both Suda and Sakurai have voiced their willingness to revisit Michigan in some form, with Suda stating he would like to either remake the game or create something new around the gameplay concept.

== Reception ==
Reception

Aggregate score
Aggregator	Score
Metacritic	53/100

Review scores
Publication	Score
Famitsu	30/40
X-Play	2/5

During 2004, Michigan: Report from Hell was among the top five hundred best-selling titles in Japan according to Media Create, selling more than 31,600 copies. Japanese gaming magazine Famitsu gave it a score of 30 points out of 40. The game received "mixed or average" reviews, according to the review aggregation website Metacritic, with a score of 53 points out of 100 based on four reviews.

Justin Speer, writing for Xplay, noted its unconventional mechanics and presentation, but felt uncomfortable with its erotic elements and either poor implementation of its mechanics or points when the control is taken from the player without warning. In an import playtest for IGN, Anoop Gantayat echoed these complaints, and did not recommend the game despite being interested in the concept. In a hands-on preview article, British magazine Official UK PlayStation 2 Magazine noted the unusual premise, but failed both the gameplay experience and the lack of advertised erotic elements, summing it up as "a watered-down" survival horror with "ropey" voice-acting and a "terrible" plot.

John Sczepaniak of Hardcore Gaming 101, writing in 2012, felt that the game was bad due to its unpolished mechanics and lack of interactivity, but nevertheless called it a "genuinely unique experiment, since there really is nothing else even remotely like it in the grand history of video games". Jeff Cork, writing for Game Informer for the website's "Replay" video features in 2014, felt the game could have become a cult classic if released in North America. Nick Thorpe of Retro Gamer highlighted the game's unique approach to the genre and passive gameplay style, noting that it was becoming a collector's item due to its rarity and Suda's growing reputation.

In a feature on Grasshopper Manufacture, 1UP.com's Ray Barnholt was not very positive about the game, noting both its erotic elements and limited interactivity. Michigan was featured in a 2011 Game Informer article on games not released in North America, with writer Joe Juba comparing it to other Grasshopper Manufacture games that featured unique style and presentation despite lacking engaging gameplay. In a small piece on Suda's history, gaming magazine Play noted Michigan as having an "interesting twist" on the horror genre.
