= Samurai Champloo: Sidetracked =

2006 video game

- North American box art
- Developer: Grasshopper Manufacture
- Publisher: Namco Bandai Games (Note: Released under the Bandai brand in Japan.)
- Director: Goichi Suda
- Producers: Takahiro Sasanoi; Yoshinobu Matsuo
- Artist: Akihiko Ishizaka
- Writers: Goichi Suda; Masahi Ooka
- Composer: Masafumi Takada
- Platform: PlayStation 2
- Release: JP: February 23, 2006; NA: April 11, 2006
- Genre: Action-adventure
- Modes: Single-player, multiplayer

Samurai Champloo: Sidetracked (Note: Known in Japan as simply Samurai Champloo (Japanese: サムライチャンプルー, Hepburn: Samurai Chanpurū)) is a 2006 action-adventure game. A tie-in with the 2004 anime television series Samurai Champloo, the game was developed by Grasshopper Manufacture and published by Namco Bandai Games for PlayStation 2. Described as an untold story set within the series, the game has storylines following series protagonists Mugen, Jin and Fuu, and new protagonist Worso Tsurumaki during a political conflict in Edo period Hokkaido.

== Premise and gameplay ==
An early combat section from Samurai Champloo; Mugen fights a group of enemies.

Samurai Champloo: Sidetracked is an action-adventure game based on the 2004 anime television series Samurai Champloo. Set in the Edo period, the anime's storyline follows the adventures of three wanderers; the outlaw swordsman Mugen, the ronin Jin, and the itinerant Fuu who saved the two from execution in exchange for help finding a samurai who smells of sunflowers. The storyline is described as a "missing episode" of the trio's travels through Japan. They end up taking a ship to Ezo (modern day Hokkaido), which is suffering from conflicts between the ruling Matsumae clan and the indigenous people. Mugen and Jin's storylines run on separate yet parallel paths, and they interact with original character Worso Tsurumaki, who is associated with the native resistance of Ezo.

Players take control of three characters; they first complete a story campaign as either Mugen or Jin, and after one of these is completed Worso's campaign is unlocked. The remaining character Fuu is only playable in minigames. Gameplay focuses on melee hack and slash combat with the chosen player character, completing basic combos using alternating weak and strong attacks. The battle system is split into multiple styles, which are influenced by what musical track is playing through equippable record albums, switched using the analog sticks. Filling a tension metre activates Tate mode, where a quick time event is triggered to kill a number of enemies within a time limit. The game is split into stages divided between the different campaigns, and separated by visits to the main town where new weapons and music discs can be purchased after being unlocked through high scores when in Tate. The game also features a two-player competitive multiplayer mode, with the winner being determined by their kill number and combo count.

== Development and release ==
Samurai Champloo was created by director Shinichirō Watanabe and anime studio Manglobe, with the aim of blending a traditional Japanese setting with the culture and music of hip hop. Sidetracked was one of two licensed anime titles created by Grasshopper Manufacture for the PlayStation 2, the other being Blood+: One Night Kiss based on the series Blood+. During the period after completing Killer7, Grasshopper Manufacture were left in a financially precarious position, taking on contract work including licensed titles. Company founder Goichi Suda selected Sidetracked from a group of potential projects presented by Namco Bandai Games, coincidentally after he had watched and liked the anime's first episode. Speaking in 2006, Suda cited these licensed projects as the first sign of the company's international recognition following the release of Killer7. Suda acted as the game's director and co-writer. It was co-produced by Namco Bandai's Takahiro Sasanoi and Yoshinobu Matsuo. The original cast (Ayako Kawasumi as Fuu, Kazuya Nakai as Mugen, and Ginpei Sato as Jin) returned, with new character Worso being voiced by Akira Ishida.

Suda co-wrote the scenario with Masahi Ooka, with whom he had worked since The Silver Case (1999). Grasshopper Manufacture had to work on the project with two restrictions; no mention was to be made of the word Edo, and the "samurai who smells of sunflowers" was not to be included. Outside those restrictions the team were given complete creative freedom, influencing Suda to set the game in the Ezo region, intending it as a deliberate contrast with the characters going to Kyushu in the anime. He described the relationship with the original studio Manglobe as "easy-going", with Grasshopper being allowed to choose the game's genre and Watanabe checking the script and voice work so it remained consistent with the anime. Suda enjoyed working with the staff, citing it as a positive interaction between game designers and animators that was rare in Japan.

The gameplay was designed with a North American audience in mind, also incorporating the musical elements the anime was known for. According to Matsuo, the genre was chosen as it fit in with the series's tone and action. Suda felt Grasshopper and Samurai Champloo were a good fit due to the studio's reputation for games with a non-traditional style, though he later noted that when contracted Grasshopper were asked to hold back the studio's "signature style". The art director was Akihiko Ishizaka, while Katsu Fukamachi, Junya Iwata and Kazuhiko Enzaki acted as character designers. The team used their experience creating cel-shaded graphics for Killer7 when creating the art design. The CGI opening was created by Jet Studio, re-creating the anime's opening using realistic versions of the anime's protagonists. Motion capture was handled by Dynapix.

The game was first announced by Namco Bandai in August 2005. It was previewed to the public at that year's Tokyo Game Show. The localization was handled by Bang Zoom! Entertainment, the same studio who handled the original series. The original English cast returned with the exception of Mugen's voice actor Steve Blum, who was replaced by Liam O'Brien. Worso is voiced by Lex Lang, who voiced the characters Shoryu and Xavier III in the anime dub. It was released on February 23, 2006, in Japan, and on April 11 in North America. His work on Sidetracked together with Blood+: One Night Kiss, both using more action-based gameplay, informed Suda's design on his next project No More Heroes.

=== Music ===
The anime's opening theme "Battlecry", composed by Nujabes and performed by Shing02, is used in the game's CGI opening. Due to difficulties with licensing, none of the anime's soundtrack was used for the in-game music. The music was composed by Masafumi Takada, a long-time collaborator of Suda's and a core member of Grasshopper's in-house sound team. Takada was a fan of the anime's soundtrack, listening to it and emulating it as much as he could within his original music. Sidetracked was Takada's first time using the Logic Pro workstation, finding it well suited to creating the game's soundtrack. A soundtrack album was released on March 1, 2006, by Scitron Digital Contents.

== Reception ==
Reception

Aggregate score
| Aggregator | Score |
|---|---|
| Metacritic | 66/100 |

Review scores
| Publication | Score |
|---|---|
| 1Up.com | B− |
| Edge | 6/10 |
| Famitsu | 31/40 |
| Game Informer | 6.75/10 |
| GamePro | 3.5/5 |
| GameZone | 7.5/10 |
| IGN | 7.2/10 |
| Official U.S. PlayStation Magazine | 2/5 |
| PlayStation: The Official Magazine | 6/10 |
| X-Play | 2/5 |

The game received "average" reviews according to video game review aggregator Metacritic. In Japan, Famitsu gave it a score of three eights and one seven, for a total of 31 out of 40.
