= Masafumi Takada =

Japanese composer (born 1970)

- 高田 雅史
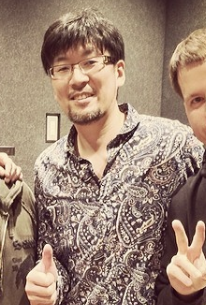
- Takada in 2014
- Born: August 2, 1970 (age 56); Inuyama, Aichi, Japan
- Occupations: Composer; sound designer
- Years active: 1996–present
- Musical career
- Genres: Ambient; rock; techno; jazz; video game music
- Instrument: Keyboards
- Label: Sound Prestige
- Website: soundprestige.jp

Masafumi Takada (高田 雅史, Takada Masafumi; born August 2, 1970) is a Japanese composer and sound designer, best known for his work on the soundtracks for killer7, God Hand, No More Heroes, and the Earth Defense Force and Danganronpa series. Takada has worked on multiple projects for Goichi Suda's studio Grasshopper Manufacture and co-founded Too Kyo Games in 2017.

== Career ==
Takada was born in Inuyama, Aichi, Japan, and took interest in music since childhood after playing the Electone at Yamaha Music School and experimenting with synthesizers. He learned to play the piano and tuba in high school and studied music in Tokyo for six years, earning a degree. He entered the game industry around the end of the Super Famicom, which he felt was a good time as game console sound chips were becoming more advanced. In 1997, Takada composed the soundtrack of Moonlight Syndrome, directed by Goichi Suda. Takada would compose music for multiple projects by Grasshopper Manufacture, which Suda founded after leaving Human Entertainment. For killer7, Takada placed a large emphasis on ambient music and sought to retell the game's story through the music. He considers the game's soundtrack to be among his favorite work. For No More Heroes, Takada took inspiration from The Chemical Brothers for the boss music.

On November 5, 2008, Takada founded Sound Prestige, a music and sound production company. The company also functions as a record label where Takada publishes his own music. Takada composed the soundtrack of Danganronpa: Trigger Happy Havoc which released in 2010. For the soundtrack, Takada combined a variety of tones to convey tension and claustrophobia during exploration, and a sense of momentum during trials. Takada returned to compose the soundtrack of the sequel, Danganronpa 2: Goodbye Despair, in 2012, which sought to convey a tropical feel due to the change in setting. Takada composed for Danganronpa V3: Killing Harmony in 2017, aiming for a more mature composition which ended up being more jazz-oriented. The soundtrack for V3 was much larger than the previous titles, and was split into two album releases.

In 2017, Takada co-founded the video game development studio Too Kyo Games, alongside former members of Spike Chunsoft. With the company, he composed for Death Come True (2020), Master Detective Archives: Rain Code (2023), and The Hundred Line: Last Defense Academy (2025). For The Hundred Line, Takada focused on treating the music like its own character, and sought to incorporate sounds similar to his past work using a Virus TI synthesizer. He considered Sirei's theme song to be the most challenging to compose, due to the character's similarity to Danganronpa's Monokuma. Takada initially had sound designer Jun Fukuda perform vocals, but ultimately decided to edit the vocals for the final version of the song.

== Works ==
All works listed below were composed by Takada unless otherwise noted.

=== Video games ===
Year	Title	Notes	Ref.
1996	Tsuribaka Nisshi	Music	
1996	Ranma ½: Battle Renaissance	Music	
1996	Parking Meijin	Music	
1997	2Tax Gold	Music	
1997	Moonlight Syndrome	Music	
1998	Air Boarder 64	Music	
1998	Mikagura Shōjo Tanteidan	Music	
1998	Mizzurna Falls	Piano arrangements	
1999	Neko Zamurai	Music	
1999	Remote Control Dandy	Music	
1999	The Silver Case	Music	
2001	Flower, Sun, and Rain	Music	
2002	Robot Alchemic Drive	Music	
2003	Monster Attack	Music	
2003	Shining Soul II	Music	
2003	Shin Mikagura Shōjo Tanteidan	Music	
2004	Steel Battalion: Line of Contact	Music	
2004	Tetsujin 28-go	Music	
2004	Michigan: Report from Hell	Music	
2005	killer7	Music	
2005	Global Defence Force	Music	
2005	The 25th Ward: The Silver Case	Music	
2006	Samurai Champloo: Sidetracked	Music	
2006	Contact	Music	
2006	Blood+: One Night Kiss	Music with Jun Fukuda and Shinya Tanaka	
2006	Chōsōjū Mecha MG	Music	
2006	God Hand	Music	
2006	Beatmania IIDX 12: Happy Sky	"IceCube Pf.(RX-Ver.S.P.L.)"	
2006	Earth Defense Force 2017	Music	
2007	Beatmania IIDX 13: Distorted	"WaterCube Pf.(RX-Ver.S.P.L.)"	
2007	Resident Evil: The Umbrella Chronicles	Music with Jun Fukuda	
2007	No More Heroes	Music	
2008	Super Smash Bros. Brawl	Arrangements (Note: "Ending" from Yoshi's Story, "Mike's Song" from WarioWare: Touched!, "Mike's Song" from Made in Wario, "Main Theme" from Shin Onigashima, "Lip's Theme" from Panel de Pon, "Type B" from Tetris, "Marionation Gear" from Chou Soujuu Mecha MG)	
2008	Flower, Sun, and Rain: Murder and Mystery in Paradise	Music	
2008	Beatmania IIDX 14: Gold	"PentaCube Gt.(RX-Ver.S.P.L.)"	
2008	Fatal Frame: Mask of the Lunar Eclipse	Music	
2009	Infinite Space	Music	
2009	Beatmania IIDX 16: Empress	"ToyCube Pf.(RX-Ver.S.P.L.)"	
2010	Zangeki no Reginleiv	Music	
2010	Vanquish	Music	
2010	Danganronpa: Trigger Happy Havoc	Music	
2012	Kid Icarus: Uprising	Music with various others	
2012	Danganronpa 2: Goodbye Despair	Music	
2013	Earth Defense Force 2025	Music	
2014	Guardian Summoner	Music	
2014	Super Smash Bros. for Nintendo 3DS and Wii U	arrangements	
2014	Danganronpa Another Episode: Ultra Despair Girls	Music	
2014	The Evil Within	Music	
2015	100 Sleeping Princes and the Kingdom of Dreams	Music	
2015	Digimon Story: Cyber Sleuth	Music	
2015	Earth Defense Force 4.1: The Shadow of New Despair	Music with Jun Fukuda	
2015	World Gimmick	Music	
2016	Crypt of the NecroDancer	Danganronpa arrangements	
2016	Wagyan Shiritori de Shoubu da!	Music	
2016	Teenage Mutant Ninja Turtles: Mutants in Manhattan	Music with Naofumi Harada	
2016	Beatmania IIDX 24: Sinobuz	"Yellow Sketch(RX-Ver.S.P.L.)"	
2017	Danganronpa V3: Killing Harmony	Music	
2017	Hana Oboro: Sengoku-den Ranki	Music	
2017	Earth Defense Force 5	Music with Jun Fukuda	
2017	Digimon Story: Cyber Sleuth – Hacker's Memory	Music	
2018	Super Smash Bros. Ultimate	Arrangements	
2019	Renshin Astral	Cairo battle themes	
2020	Death Come True	Music	
2022	Earth Defense Force 6	Music with Jun Fukuda	
2023	Master Detective Archives: Rain Code	Music	
2025	Tribe Nine	Music	
2025	The Hundred Line: Last Defense Academy	Music	
2025	Shuten Order	Music	
2025	Digimon Story: Time Stranger	Music	
2027	Danganronpa 2×2	Music with Jun Fukuda	

=== Anime ===
Year	Title	Notes	Ref.
2013	Danganronpa: The Animation	Music	
2016	Danganronpa 3: The End of Hope's Peak High School	Music	
2018	100 Sleeping Princes and the Kingdom of Dreams	Music	
2019	Days of Urashimasakatasen	Music	
2022	Tribe Nine	Music	
