= Moonlight Syndrome =

1997 video game

- Developer: Human Entertainment
- Publisher: Human Entertainment
- Director: Goichi Suda
- Programmer: Yuki Hoshino
- Artist: Takashi Miyamoto
- Writer: Goichi Suda
- Composer: Masafumi Takada
- Series: Twilight Syndrome
- Platform: PlayStation
- Release: JP: 9 October 1997
- Genre: Adventure
- Mode: Single-player

Moonlight Syndrome (Note: Japanese: ムーンライトシンドローム, Hepburn: Mūnraito Shindorōmu) is a horror-themed adventure game developed and published by Human Entertainment for the PlayStation in October 1997. An entry in the company's Twilight Syndrome series, the game was directed and co-written by Goichi Suda. Retaining the combination of adventure and visual novel elements from earlier games in the series, Moonlight Syndrome follows series protagonist Mika Kishii as she investigates supernatural phenomena.

Development of Moonlight Syndrome began following the completion of Suda's work on the first Twilight Syndrome games. Due to having little input on the original games' stories and disliking the ghost story elements, Suda focused the plot of Moonlight Syndrome around psychological horror and human capacity for evil. Critics liked the game's story but criticized the characters and long, inconsequential dialogue trees. Suda left Human Entertainment to form Grasshopper Manufacture following the release of Moonlight Syndrome, but the game remained an influence in his later work.

== Gameplay ==
Main protagonist Mika Kishii during an early chapter of the game.

Similar to other titles in the Twilight Syndrome series, Moonlight Syndrome combines elements from adventure games and visual novels in its gameplay. The game contains both exploration in real-time environments and CGI story cutscenes. The player controls multiple characters across ten different chapters, with the main aim being to explore environments from a side-scrolling perspective, interact with objects, and talk with characters to progress the narrative. During certain moments, the player can select different options for the character to perform, producing minor variations in subsequent events; these extend from the solving of puzzles to how characters respond to the player during conversations. Despite these choices, the game's story follows a linear path to the same ending.

== Synopsis ==
Moonlight Syndrome takes place in a parallel reality to that of the main Twilight Syndrome series. One year after the events of Twilight Syndrome: Investigation, series protagonist Mika Kishii is attending high school in the town of Takashi when she begins to sense something very wrong with the people there. Events are brought to the fore when fellow student Kyoko Kazan is killed in an accident. Determining that all of these problems are a result of a psychic phenomena surrounding Takashi, Mika is joined in her investigation by Chisato Itsushima and Yukari Hasegawa. As Mika tries to balance her investigation and leading a normal life, events being to escalate with violent incidents ranging from a mass suicide near her home to disturbing behavior from several of her close friends. Many of them, herself included, are confronted by a white-haired boy during the incidents.

Eventually, Mika becomes troubled by hallucinations and strange dreams related to Takashi's plight, and several students die in suspicious circumstances, leaving the survivors increasingly disturbed. Events culminate for Mika when she is confronted by the white-haired boy, after which she disappears. Chisato and Yukari, along with Kyoko's brother Ryo, continue to investigate. Following multiple psychic signs of Mika's presence, Chisato and Yukari are killed directly or indirectly by the white-haired boy's actions. This leaves Ryo to eventually confront the boy, a supernatural being who has been subtly manipulating these incidents by forming contracts.

The boy has been attempting to demonstrate to Mika what he perceives as humanity's true nature as all of the events surrounding Takashi were a result of people making selfish contracts with the boy in exchange for someone's death, with Kyoko's death stemming from a jealous student due to her incestuous love for Ryo. After Ryo seemingly defeats the white-haired boy, he briefly reunites with Mika, only for her to die in his arms as they embrace. In a post-credits scene, an unhinged Ryo is seen holding a paper bag on his lap containing the severed head of Kyoko, while Mika's face appears on a nearby television.

== Development ==
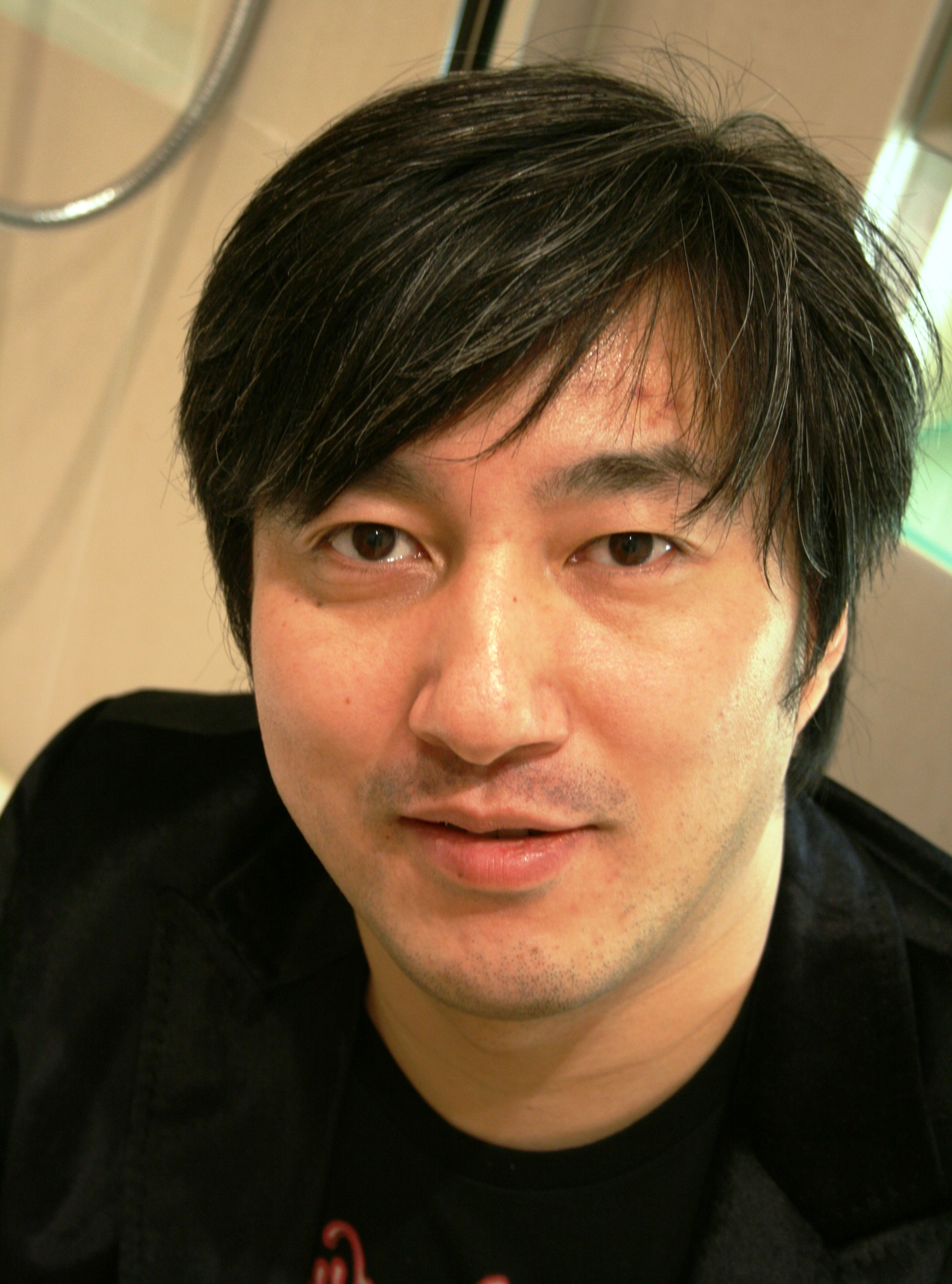
Goichi Suda directed and wrote Moonlight Syndrome.

Moonlight Syndrome is an entry from the Twilight Syndrome series, and the first entry in the series to feature major input from Goichi Suda, who acted as writer and director. Suda had previously served as director of the first two Twilight Syndrome games when the original director had to step down due to scheduling conflicts, but he was unable to have much input. He wanted to create his own take on the series with Moonlight Syndrome, similar to how he had created an unconventional and notoriously dark ending to Super Fire Pro Wrestling Special in reaction to his restricted work on Super Fire Pro Wrestling III. The game began development following the release of the second Twilight Syndrome game. While the series focused on supernatural horror, Suda wanted to create something more frightening and apart the ghost story elements which genuinely scared him to the point he did not want to be involved with the series. This resulted in the story shifting away from paranormal elements and using psychological horror. The aim was to increase the frightening aspects of the game by making the violent incidents within the story random and caused by people rather than supernatural entities.

The characters were designed by Takashi Miyamoto, who was picked by Suda based on his earlier work on another project. Suda's main wish with the characters was to take the cast of Twilight Syndrome and confront them with a clashing set of ideologies. Moonlight Syndrome also saw the introduction of voice acting to the series, as Suda wanted to express the story differently. For voiced segments, subtitles were omitted to heighten this sense of contrasting story-telling styles. When recording their lines, Suda remembered that the voice actors commented that they did not understand what was going on in the story. The music was composed by Masafumi Takada.

Due to his extensive creative control as compared to the original games, Suda was able to include several strange images, including the final scene featuring a head in a bag. During production, government restrictions around content in games and entertainment media were tightened due to the Kobe child murders and their resultant controversy. The new censorship rules forced Suda to tone down some of the more extreme imagery, especially since the main character murders others in a similar manner to the child murderer.

== Reception ==
Reception

Review score
Publication	Score
Famitsu	7/10, 5/10, 6/10, 8/10

The game was released on 9 October 1997. One reviewer from Famitsu magazine noted that those expecting the "simple school horror" of earlier titles would be shocked by the game's story. Two other reviewers felt uncomfortable with how the characters were portrayed and believed the dialogue segments were lengthy and the CGI was poor in quality. In a 2016 retrospective, Den Faminico Gamer criticized the characters and the lack of branching scenarios, feeling the game was linear and the speech choices had no consequence. They did acknowledge the story was bizarre and recommended those interested simply watch a playthrough.

== Legacy ==
Moonlight Syndrome was the last game Suda worked on at Human Entertainment before leaving. He was unsatisfied with his bonuses, and felt the company would soon be bankrupt. Following his departure, he formed his own company Grasshopper Manufacture. Their debut game, The Silver Case, was released in 1999. Suda directed, co-wrote and designed the game, while Miyamoto and Takada were brought back as character designer and composer. Suda also brought in Masahi Ooka as co-writer after being impressed with Ooka's work on a supplemental story created for a Moonlight Syndrome strategy guide. Grasshopper Manufacture has borrowed settings and characters from Moonlight Syndrome for The Silver Case and some of their other work including Flower, Sun, and Rain.

Suda's use of strange and disturbing imagery within his storytelling would become a hallmark of his later work. The game's urban setting, which featured apartment complexes, would feature in other projects by Suda including Blood+: One Night Kiss and No More Heroes. Naoko Sato, scenario writer of the video game Siren, cited Moonlight Syndrome as one of the inspirations for the scenario and writing of Siren.
