= Liberation Maiden =

2012 video game

- Developer: Grasshopper Manufacture
- Publisher: Level-5
- Directors: Makoto Chida; Goichi Suda
- Artists: Yūsuke Kozaki; Mahiro Maeda; Shigetu Koyama
- Writer: Masahiro Yuki
- Composer: Akira Yamaoka
- Series: Guild
- Platforms: Nintendo 3DS, iOS
- Release: Nintendo 3DS; Guild01; JP: May 31, 2012 Nintendo eShop; EU: October 4, 2012; NA: October 25, 2012; JP: November 14, 2012 iOS; JP: March 7, 2013
- Genre: Shoot 'em up
- Mode: Single-player

Liberation Maiden (Note: Japanese: 解放少女, Hepburn: Kaihō Shōjo) is a shooter game developed by Grasshopper Manufacture and published by Level-5. It was originally included in the Guild01 compilation for the Nintendo 3DS in 2012, and later made available separately on Nintendo eShop. A stand-alone high definition version was also released for the iOS in 2013.

== Gameplay ==
The player flies Kamui into the map and the Touch Screen is used to fire missiles or lasers at enemies. At the end of each stage is a Spike boss which can be revealed by firing missiles or lasers around its location. The Spike's thick armor can be pierced using a special technique of rapidly drawing circles on the Touch Screen.

== Plot ==
An invading country is stealing all of Japan's energy. The player controls Shoko (voiced by Kana Hanazawa), a high school girl who became President of New Japan after her father's assassination, as she enters the mecha Kamui to fight back.

== Development and release ==
Liberation Maiden was result of its creative director Goichi Suda's interest in developing for the Nintendo 3DS, which dates back to before the release of the console. It features animated cutscenes created by Studio BONES and the main theme song, "Day of Liberation" (解放の日, Kaihno Hi), performed by Marina. Liberation Maiden shares stylistic traits with other material from Grasshopper Manufacture's repertoire, particularly Pure White Lover Bizarre Jelly, an in-game anime within the No More Heroes universe.

The game was released in Europe on October 4, 2012, in North America on October 25, 2012, and individually in Japan on November 14, 2012. A later high-definition version was released internationally for the iOS systems on March 7, 2013.

== Reception ==
Reception

Aggregate score
| Aggregator | Score |
|---|---|
| Metacritic | (3DS) 69/100 (iOS) 68/100 |

Review scores
| Publication | Score |
|---|---|
| Destructoid | 8/10 |
| Nintendo Life | 7/10 |

In Japan, Liberation Maiden was released as part of Guild01. It has received mostly positive or average reviews on 3DS, but it has sold poorly. In the west, Liberation Maiden also received mostly positive or average reviews on both platforms.

== Sequel ==
A visual novel sequel to the game, titled Liberation Maiden SIN, was developed by 5pb. for the PlayStation 3 on December 5, 2013. A PlayStation Vita version was later released on July 31, 2014. Both versions have not been released outside of Japan. It was written by Goichi Suda and composed by Yasutaka Nakamura and Takeshi Abo.
