= Twilight Syndrome =

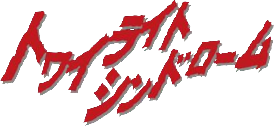
- Genre: Adventure
- Developers: Human Entertainment; Spike
- Publishers: Human Entertainment; Spike
- Platforms: PlayStation, Nintendo DS
- First release: Twilight Syndrome: Tansaku-hen; 1 March 1996
- Latest release: Twilight Syndrome: Kinjirareta Toshi Densetsu; 24 July 2008

Twilight Syndrome (Note: Japanese: トワイライトシンドローム, Hepburn: Towairaito Shindorōmu) is a horror-themed adventure game series released exclusively in Japan. It was created by Human Entertainment and continued by Spike after Human folded in the late 1990s. The games follow high school students investigating urban legends about ghosts and other paranormal happenings in their school and neighborhood.

The first two games were directed by Goichi Suda and released for the PlayStation in 1996. Suda entered the position partway through development and thus did not have much creative input. He was more deeply involved with the next game in the series, Moonlight Syndrome, but left Human shortly after to found his own company, Grasshopper Manufacture. The series was retained by Spike, which released a spiritual sequel in the form of Yuuyami Doori Tankentai, before releasing two more Twilight Syndrome games, one for the PlayStation in 2000 and a Nintendo DS game in 2008.

The games have been praised for their atmosphere and realistic 3D sound. Three live-action films based on the series have been released in Japan.

== Story ==
Screenshot from Twilight Syndrome: Tansaku-hen with Yukari, Chisato, and Mika in a classroom. The game features pseudo-3D graphics for levels.

The games are set in contemporary Japan, and follow high school students investigating urban legends about ghosts and other paranormal events in their school and neighborhood. The first two volumes follow the adventures of Yukari Hasegawa, Chisato Itsushima, and Mika Kishii exploring rumors at Hinashiro Highschool and across town. Chisato is unique among her peers in that she has psychic powers and can detect spiritual phenomenon. The sequel Moonlight Syndrome stars the original characters from the first pair of Twilight Syndrome games, but takes place in a parallel reality.

Twilight Syndrome: Saikai features an original plot with new characters and doesn't continue the storyline of the previous games. Twilight Syndrome: Kinjirareta Toshi Densetsu also features original characters. It follows Mizuki and her two friends, Riko and Reika, who she meets after moving to a new high school. After students begin receiving mysterious chain e-mail from an anonymous sender, the three girls decide to investigate.

== Gameplay ==
Twilight Syndrome is a series of adventure games about high school students investigating paranormal urban legends. The investigation of each rumor is split into individual chapters. Typically each chapter begins with the characters discussing a rumor and then embarking to investigate it on foot. The environments are explored in a side-scrolling manner, and the game periodically shifts to still image scenes with scrolling text. The games have heavy visual novel elements and the player must make numerous dialog choices during their adventure that will affect how the investigation progresses. If successful at making the correct decisions, the player will clear the scenario with the normal or best ending and unlock the next scenario. If it is failed, the player must retry.

The first games employ a pseudo-3D graphical effect showcasing levels that include school corridors, libraries, and classrooms. Twilight Syndrome: Saikai introduced 3D polygonal characters to the series, in a marked change to previous games. Saikai also contains a photo mode where pictures of the school can be taken. The realistic 3D sound effects are a staple in the series, and are best experienced with headphones. The heart rate monitor on screen is another repeating element in the series which would increase in the presence of a spirit.

Kinjirareta Toshi Densetsu introduces touch screen elements, such as using a mobile phone in-game.

== History ==
To create the character graphics in the first pair of games, Human Entertainment used footage of actors walking in front of a blue screen.

The series was launched by Human Entertainment in 1996. At the time, the company was working with 3D sound technology on arcade machines. The sound effects were received well by players, and the sound team thought it would be interesting to develop a game based on school ghost stories using this technology. Development began but soon it was not progressing well. The game's director had scheduling conflicts, so Goichi Suda was put in charge as director after finishing work on Super Fire Pro Wrestling Special (1994). Only three of the planned ten scenarios had been developed with only three months left of development time. In order to manage timelines, Suda divided the scenarios between two releases. Most of the game was already planned so he did not have much creative input. The first five scenarios were released as Twilight Syndrome: Tansaku-hen on 1 March 1996, and the final five scenarios following the same storyline were released four months later on 19 July as Kyūmei-hen.

Following the release of the original two games, Suda began work on Moonlight Syndrome. As writer and director, Suda was able to have significant creative input this time around. While the original games focused on supernatural horror, Suda wanted to shift away from paranormal elements and write about violent incidents caused by people. After the game was released on 9 October 1997, Suda decided to leave Human Entertainment as he was unsatisfied with his bonuses, and felt the company would soon be bankrupt. Following his departure, he formed his own company Grasshopper Manufacture.

After Human Entertainment folded in the late 1990s, some of the former staff went on to form Spike including some involved with Twilight Syndrome. The staff decided they wanted to develop a game that borrowed heavily from Twilight Syndrome's gameplay system, and added a new sense of realism. After two and a half years of development, Yuuyami Doori Tankentai was released on 7 October 1999 in limited quantities. The game is set in a city in economic decline during Japan's recession of the 1990s, three junior high students explore urban legends in their town. It is considered a spiritual sequel to the original series.

The producer from Yuuyami Doori Tankentai later reprised his role for the next game in the series, Twilight Syndrome: Saikai. The team sought for the new game to evolve on the original series formula in the same way as Yuuyami Doori Tantenkai. They included lead male characters and junior high students to add variety, and added a new photo mode to walk around the school and take photos of spirits. The previous games had 2D characters over 3D backgrounds, so this was the first in the series to use 3D polygons for the characters as well. It was released on 27 July 2000.

The fourth game, subtitled Kinjirareta Toshi Densetsu, was released on the Nintendo DS on 24 July 2008. The game borrows the same adventure gameplay as in earlier series entries, but uses the DS's touch screen for additional interactivity with in-game objects. The development team included horror film director Osamu Fukutani, and live actors were used to photograph the in-game images and record dialogue. The team used binaural recording methods from Arnis Sound Technologies to record the sound, making for convincing 3D sound atmosphere if played with headphones.

== Release history ==
Name	System	Publisher	Release date	Notes
Twilight Syndrome: Tansaku-hen (Note: Japanese: トワイライトシンドローム 探索編, Hepburn: Towairaito Shindorōmu Tansaku-hen; lit. Twilight Syndrome: Search volume)	PlayStation	Human Entertainment	March 1, 1996	Tansaku-hen and Kyūmei-hen were initially planned to be one game, but were split into two volumes due to development timelines. A compilation package of both games, titled Twilight Syndrome: Special, was released on July 2, 1998. A mobile version of Kyūmei-hen was released in 2008.
Twilight Syndrome: Kyūmei-hen (Note: Japanese: トワイライトシンドローム 究明編, Hepburn: Towairaito Shindorōmu Kyūmei-hen; lit. Twilight Syndrome: Investigation volume)	PlayStation	Human Entertainment	July 19, 1996	Tansaku-hen and Kyūmei-hen were initially planned to be one game, but were split into two volumes due to development timelines. A compilation package of both games, titled Twilight Syndrome: Special, was released on July 2, 1998. A mobile version of Kyūmei-hen was released in 2008.
Moonlight Syndrome	PlayStation	Human Entertainment	October 9, 1997	
Twilight Syndrome: Saikai (Note: Japanese: トワイライトシンドローム 再会, Hepburn: Towairaito Shindorōmu Saikai; lit. Twilight Syndrome: Reunion)	PlayStation	Spike	July 27, 2000	An adaptation with an original scenario was released for mobile phones in 2001.
Twilight Syndrome: Kinjirareta Toshi Densetsu (Note: Japanese: トワイライトシンドローム 禁じられた都市伝説, Hepburn: Towairaito Shindorōmu Kinjirareta Toshi Densetsu; lit. Twilight Syndrome: The Forbidden Urban Legend)	Nintendo DS	Spike	July 24, 2008	

== Reception ==
Contemporary reviews of the games were mostly positive. Famitsu enjoyed the unique gameplay as well as the 3D sound. Writing about Saikai, Famitsu again praised the sound atmosphere and believed the polygon graphics bettered the production value. When reviewing Kinjirareta Toshi Densetsu, Famitsu writers praised the horror elements, sound design, and touch screen implementation of the game. However, one reviewer cited that due to being based on popular urban legends, the scenarios may feel predictable.

The series has since developed a fan following. Writing about the original game two games, Den Faminico Gamer wrote that they were great single-player experiences thanks to their strong atmosphere. The individuality of the three girls was described as well-characterized, and the unique side-scrolling movement as enjoyable and unusual in a horror game. Gametype magazine praised the series as a stable of the horror genre, saying the games started slow but became more interesting as they went on, but also said that the plot was complex and difficult to follow for those not fluent in Japanese. In 2006, game designer Hideo Kojima said he was a "big fan" of Twilight Syndrome and that he wanted to collaborate with Goichi Suda.

== Legacy ==
The series has never been localized outside Japan and since the games feature heavy amounts of Japanese text, journalists have concluded this makes the series difficult for Westerners to comprehend. When asked about the possibility of localizing the series, Goichi Suda said that he was concerned foreign audiences would not understand the series. In addition to this, he was not personally interested in revisiting it as he did not write the original scenarios.

Suda's studio Grasshopper Manufacture has borrowed settings and characters from Moonlight Syndrome for some of their works, including The Silver Case and Flower, Sun, and Rain. Suda also hired Masahi Ooka to work on The Silver Case after reading his work in Moonlight Syndrome Truth File, a guide retelling the incidents of the game from the perspective of fictional journalists reporting on it.

A minigame called Twilight Syndrome: Murder Case appears in Danganronpa 2: Goodbye Despair (2012). It is about students investigating a murder that occurred in their school. The series once again touches the narrative of the game in the anime prequel. The video game Noroware Cycle takes inspiration from both Twilight Syndrome games and Yuuyami Doori Tankentai.

=== Film series ===
The first film based on the series, Twilight Syndrome: Sotsugyō (Graduation) was released on 23 November 2000 starring Wakana Sakai. It is set four years after Saikai, and was filmed entirely in digital video. Two more films were released around the time Kinjirareta Toshi Densetsu was released for the Nintendo DS. Dead Cruise was released on 2 August 2008 and Dead Go-round two weeks later on 16 August. In Dead Cruise, six friends depart on a cruise and discover a game that can change reality and kill people in real life. Dead Go-round follows seven people brought to a theme park to participate in a deadly game.
