= Yuuyami Doori Tankentai =

1999 horror video game

- Developer: Spike
- Publisher: Spike
- Producer: Masakazu Suzuki
- Designer: Keita Kimura
- Platform: PlayStation
- Release: JP: 7 October 1999
- Genre: Adventure
- Mode: Single-player

Yuuyami Doori Tankentai (Note: Japanese: 夕闇通り探検隊 lit. "Twilight Street Exploration Party") is a horror-themed adventure game developed and published by Spike for the PlayStation. It plays similarly to the Twilight Syndrome series by Human Entertainment, and follows a story of Japanese youths exploring paranormal urban legends in their neighborhood. The player can choose to play as one of three junior high students, first eavesdropping on rumors being discussed at their school, then investigating these rumors in the city that can be freely explored.

The game was developed over two years by former Human staff that had worked on Twilight Syndrome. It was released in Japan in 1999, following a popular trend of horror in Japanese media. It received a limited release and remained mostly unknown for years, but has grown a following over time. In retrospect, Japanese critics have praised the game as a masterpiece for its captivating sense of realism. A western journalist discussed it as a reflection of the uneasiness felt in Japanese society during the country's recession in the 1990s.

== Synopsis and gameplay ==
The characters exploring the city

Yuuyami Doori Tankentai is an adventure game that plays similarly to the Twilight Syndrome series. The game is set in the late 1990s in the fictional Hirumi City, a stereotypical Japanese neighborhood with shopping districts, hospitals, construction sites, and parks. Although never stated, it is implied the city was born out of Japan's economic boom during the 1980s and has since fallen into disrepair. The story follows three junior high school students exploring urban legends in their city, typically with a paranormal theme. The students are a boy named Nao and his dog Meros, as well as two girls, Kurumi and Sango.

Each chapter consists of two phases, first collecting rumors at the school and then later investigating them in the city. The player can choose one of the three characters to play as when starting each chapter, a choice which will affect how the story proceeds. The player is allotted five minutes to listen in on rumors at school. Each character has different friends, so may hear different rumors. There are 44 total rumors in the game. After this, the player has ten minutes to investigate any rumors by exploring the city, searching suspicious places, objects, and people. The player can consult the other characters at any time, and view information on rumors they have collected in their journal. They can also browse an in-game map of the city to aid in exploring, or use a physical map that came packaged with the game. The dog, Meros, will typically explore the city with the characters and will stop in his tracks if he senses anything strange. In some situations, the game switches to a 360-degree panorama mode, where the player can look around freely.

== Development and release ==
Horror was a popular trend in Japanese media during the late 1990s, with films such as Ring (1998) being successful. In the video game industry, the PlayStation and other hardware were pushing the limits of graphical expression, so naturally horror video games became popular. In March 1996, Human Entertainment launched the Twilight Syndrome series, 2D side-scrolling adventure games that followed three high school girls exploring strange occult phenomena in their neighborhood. After Human Entertainment folded, some of the staff went on to form Spike, including some involved with Twilight Syndrome, and decided to develop another horror game borrowing the series' gameplay system. The lead designer previously worked on the first Twilight Syndrome game, and the producer in this game later reprised his role for the third game in the Twilight Syndrome series, which was developed by Spike. The team aimed to create a sense of realism with their new game.

It was released on 7 October 1999, after two and a half years of development. Yuuyami Doori Tankentai was released in limited quantities, and it remained relatively unknown for years. European game journalists remarked the game had a low chance of being released in Europe at the time. The game garnered more interest over time and now commands high prices of 15,000 to 20,000 yen on secondary markets due to increased demand.

== Reception and legacy ==
Reception

Review scores
Publication	Score
Famitsu	26/40
Joypad	2/10

Upon release, Famitsu scored it at 26 out of 40, feeling the gameplay was old fashioned and its horror elements came late after the Japanese horror boom. French magazine Joypad reviewed the game, giving a low score saying that although an adventure-horror game without action is popular among Japanese schoolgirls they had no interest in it. They also remarked that the narrative requires high level of understanding of Japanese to understand.

Japanese critics have dubbed the game a "masterpiece" in retrospect. Dengeki Online was disappointed the game was not more well known, feeling it is one of the best takes on urban legend storytelling and a better style of horror than the shock and jump scares popular in the 2010s. They praised the originality of the rumors, and enjoyed the process of unraveling the stories. Game*Spark called it one of the best horror games on the PlayStation, praising its graphics, writing, and freedom of exploration. Dengeki Online wrote that the graphical style added a sense of realism, giving it a casual "everyday" feel. Den Faminico Gamer agreed, saying the game's realistic graphics and ambience, such as construction and traffic noises, helped establish fear. Dengeki Online also complimented the map packaged with the game, giving a sense that the city was real.

In 2017, Brian Crimmins (writing for Heterotopias) discussed Yuuyami Doori Tankentai as a reflection of the uncertainty felt in Japanese society during the 1990s recession. He felt the game was particularly notable for how it realistically portrayed the lives of Japanese youth, and felt the game's horror lied not in the rumor storylines, but in the daily reality experienced by the characters in a city defined by "urban decay and lost innocence". He writes: "Nao and company’s emotional outlooks coincide well with what the space around them has fallen into. Very generally Hirumi's environments connote alienation, lost futures, and a lack of control over one’s life". He cited examples such as the tangled web of streets that make up the city, the complications of school socialization, and the varied environments which ranged from empty to claustrophobic.
