= The 25th Ward: The Silver Case =

2005 video game

- North American PlayStation 4 box art
- Developer: Grasshopper Manufacture
- Publishers: Mobile; Genki (2005–2007); Liveware (2007–2011); Win, Mac, Lin, PS4; JP: Nippon Ichi Software; WW: NIS America Nintendo Switch; JP: Playism; WW: NIS America
- Director: Goichi Suda
- Artist: Takashi Miyamoto
- Writers: Goichi Suda; Masahi Ooka; Sako Kato; Masahiro Yuki
- Composer: Masafumi Takada (Note: The music for the remake was composed by Akira Yamaoka, Baiyon, and Erika Ito)
- Platforms: Mobile, Windows, macOS, Linux, PlayStation 4, Nintendo Switch
- Release: October 3, 2005: Mobile; JP: October 3, 2005 Windows, macOS, Linux; WW: March 13, 2018 PlayStation 4; WW: March 13, 2018; JP: March 15, 2018 Nintendo Switch; JP: February 18, 2021; NA: July 6, 2021; EU: July 9, 2021
- Genre: Adventure
- Mode: Single-player

The 25th Ward: The Silver Case (Note: Japanese: シルバー事件25区, Hepburn: Shirubā Jiken 25-Ku) is an adventure game developed by Grasshopper Manufacture. Acting as a sequel to the company's debut title The Silver Case, it was first released for mobile devices in October 2005, remained in service through different providers until May 2011. The original version's gameplay focuses on solving puzzles using number inputs. The story, set seven years after The Silver Case, follows a new group of characters in the 25th Ward district solving a series of murders.

The 25th Ward was created by Goichi Suda as part of a collaboration with Genki. As he wanted to quickly create a sequel to The Silver Case and wanted to take a different stylistic direction, the proposed mobile platforms suited him. Suda returned along with original scenario writers Masahi Ooka and Sako Kato to write the scenarios. Takashi Miyamoto and Masafumi Takada also returned as character designer and composer respectively. The remake began development following the success of the 2016 high-definition remaster of The Silver Case. Due to the original's origins as a mobile game, Suda decided to completely remake the game instead of just remastering it.

== Gameplay ==
The 25th Ward: The Silver Case is an adventure game in which players take on the role of different characters while navigating three scenarios. In the original mobile game, players read through story segments before issuing commands that advance the story. The original version released for mobiles used number inputs.

== Synopsis ==
The story is set seven years after its predecessor The Silver Case. The scenario is divided into three parts: "Correctness", "Matchmaker" and "Placebo". Each scenario is further divided into five episodes. Set within the newly-created 25th Ward district, "Correctness" follows Mokutaro Shiroyabu and Shinko Kuroyanagi investigating bizarre and violent murders; "Matchmaker" traces the exploits of Regional Adjustment Division officer Shinkai Tsuki during his interaction with the underworld of the 25th Ward; while "Placebo" follows Tokio Morishima, a returning character from the original game, investigating events in the 25th Ward guided by a mysterious "Goddess". As the story progresses, the first game's central figure Kamui Uehara reappears, drawing together the three narratives.

== Development ==
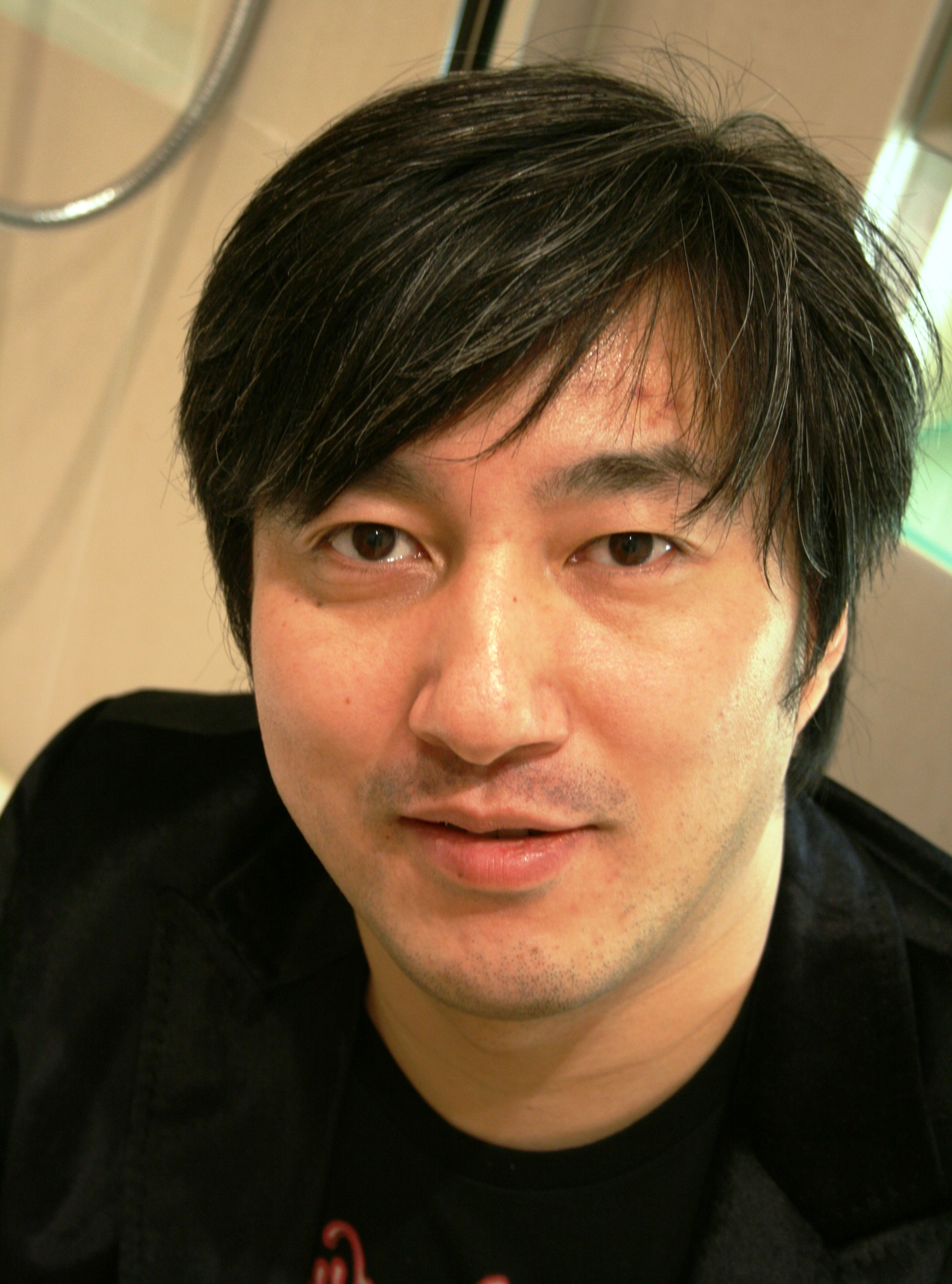
Goichi Suda, creator of both The 25th Ward: The Silver Case and its predecessor The Silver Case; Suda wrote one of the three scenarios.

The 25th Ward was created by Goichi Suda, founder of developer Grasshopper Manufacture and creator of the company's debut title, The Silver Case. While there was an idea to develop The 25th Ward for the PlayStation 2, the game ended up being developed on mobile platforms as Suda wanted to complete the project quickly. The project, a collaboration with Genki, took the form of a sequel to The Silver Case as there was a lot of demand for a return to the game's world and characters. Suda also wanted to write a long story. Suda created the game so that it would be accessible for both newcomers and fans of the original game, in addition to providing more game-based content for mobiles. Character designs and artwork were created by Takashi Miyamoto, while the music was composed by Masafumi Takada. The game used a monochromatic art style, both due to the mobile platform's hardware limitations, and Suda's desire to go in a different artistic direction from the original game. Suda wrote the "Correctness" scenario, the "Match Maker" scenario was written by Masahiro Yuki, while the "Placebo" scenario was written by Masahi Ooka. Both Suda and Ooka had previously worked on the scenario for The Silver Case. The original game used a two-storyline structure, with an additional storyline being added when Yuki suggested another storyline of his creation. Its title was taken from the professional wrestling term "matchmaking". The storylines were written simultaneously due to episode delivery deadlines. The original scenarios were spread across five episodes; a sixth episode was planned but never materialized.

The 25th Ward was first showcased at the 2005 Tokyo Game Show. The game began distribution through Genki's mobile portal on 3 October for DoCoMO, EZweb, and Vodafone. Episodes were released sporadically over the next year, with updates for newer mobile phone models. The final episode of the original version, the fourth episode of the "Placebo" scenario, was released on 3 July 2006. During the mobile version's lifespan, an original scenario dubbed "Transmitter Digital Man" was released on 1 June, featuring the original game's protagonist Sumio Kodai. Distribution of the original version ended on 28 February 2007 due to license agreement changes between Genki and its mobile partners. The game resumed distribution through Liveware on 17 December for DoCoMo and Yahoo! devices after a prolonged hiatus. In addition to the original four episodes, a new episode for each story was written, with the episodes being released on 30 April 2008. A version with enhanced graphics was released on 13 March 2009. The second mobile version of The 25th Ward shut down in May 2011.

A version of The 25th Ward for the Nintendo DS was originally planned by Suda, to be released with the planned DS port of the original game. The existence of The 25th Ward meant that no new content was created for the DS port of The Silver Case. In a later interview, Suda referred to The 25th Ward as a "ghost" game due to its status as a mobile title that was no longer available for download. The Silver Case was re-released as a high-definition remaster in 2016, with Suda commenting that it if sold well he would consider remaking The 25th Ward, eventually developing it in the following year. Due to the game's age and initial platform, Suda decided upon a complete remake rather than a remaster. PlayStation 4 and Windows versions were released on 15 March 2018. The PlayStation 4 version was packaged with its predecessor in Japan under the title The Silver Case 2425. A port of The Silver Case 2425 for the Nintendo Switch was released in Japan on 18 February 2021, and for North America and Europe in July.

== Reception ==
Reception

Aggregate scores
Aggregator	Score
Metacritic	68/100 (15 reviews)
OpenCritic	38% recommend

Review scores
Publication	Score
GameSpot	6/10
Hardcore Gamer	4/5
PlayStation Lifestyle	8/10
RPGFan	45%

The PlayStation 4 version of The 25th Ward: The Silver Case received "mixed or average" reviews from critics, according to the review aggregation website Metacritic. Fellow review aggregator OpenCritic assessed that the game received weak approval, being recommended by only 38% of critics.
