= Goichi Suda =

Japanese video game designer (born 1968)

- 須田 剛一
- Suda at the Toulouse Game Show, 2012
- Born: January 2, 1968 (age 58); Ueda, Nagano, Japan
- Other name: Suda51
- Occupations: Video game designer, director, writer
- Years active: 1993–present
- Known for: The Silver Case; Killer7; No More Heroes; Lollipop Chainsaw; Killer Is Dead; Romeo Is a Dead Man
- Title: Founder and CEO of Grasshopper Manufacture

Goichi Suda (須田 剛一, Suda Gōichi; born January 2, 1968), known by his alias Suda51, is a Japanese video game designer and writer. Affiliated with Human Entertainment from 1994 to 1998, he founded Grasshopper Manufacture in 1998 with a number of other Human Entertainment staff to produce their own titles. His best-known work has come from Grasshopper Manufacture, including The Silver Case (1999), Killer7 (2005), the No More Heroes series, and Lollipop Chainsaw (2012).

Suda is from Nagano Prefecture, moving to Tokyo at the age of 18 and eventually being hired by Human Entertainment after having a number of other jobs including as an undertaker. His first projects were in the Fire Pro Wrestling and Twilight Syndrome series. At Grasshopper Manufacture, he worked on their debut title The Silver Case as writer and director. The Silver Case helped establish both Suda and his company in Japan, but Suda and Grasshopper gained international attention with the release of Killer7, Suda's first title to be released outside Japan. He has contributed to most of the company's projects, taking on a more managerial role following No More Heroes in 2007.

Suda's work is characterized by a focus on themes of crime, and the clash of people with different ideals. While his early works adopted a serious tone, his later projects incorporated elements of humor. Sexual elements have also made appearances in his work to the point where he became worried they would become too heavily associated with him. Aspects of his work have been influenced by film and literature, with one of his favorite authors being Franz Kafka. He frequently incorporates references to pop culture in his games.

== Biography ==
=== Early and personal life ===
Goichi Suda was born in the city of Ueda in Japan's Nagano Prefecture on January 2, 1968, and lived in the region until moving to Tokyo when he was eighteen. Suda has spoken little of his early life, but he did not have a good relationship with his family, and disliked living in Nagano. He wished to design video games from an early age. While distant from his family in Nagano, Suda is married and has his own family in Tokyo. Among his early jobs were working at Sega as a graphics designer for their brochures. One of his more notable jobs was as an undertaker, although he was more involved with flower arrangements. Still determined on a career in video games, and with encouragement from his wife, he applied to both Atlus and Human Entertainment, the latter known for the Fire Pro Wrestling series. He managed to get an interview with and hired by Human Entertainment. In later years, Suda would come to be known by the nickname "Suda51". The name is a numeric substitution pun based on the two parts of his given name—"go" translates to "5" and "ichi" to "1".

=== Career ===
Suda's first job at Human was as a director for Super Fire Pro Wrestling III (1993), which earned him praise from the company due to the quality of his work. Due to this, he was appointed as both director and writer for Super Fire Pro Wrestling Special (1994), which gained long-term notoriety for the bleak tone of its story and ending. Following Super Fire Pro Wrestling III, Suda worked on the Twilight Syndrome series; he initially had to step in as producer and director for Twilight Syndrome, but he had greater creative input in Moonlight Syndrome (1998): one of his decisions was to shift Moonlight Syndrome away from supernatural into psychological horror. Suda, who had gathered a fan base from his work at Human, generated controversy by killing off the main character in Moonlight Syndrome. Moonlight Syndrome would be the last game worked on by Suda for Human Entertainment, as he left due to being unsatisfied with available money bonuses. He also sensed that Human Entertainment, which would declare bankruptcy the following year, was not a secure position. After leaving Human Entertainment in 1998, Suda founded Grasshopper Manufacture to fulfill his wish to create original video game projects. Its debut title was The Silver Case for the PlayStation. He was initially approached by ASCII Entertainment, who acted as the game's publishers and provided funding. Suda acted as director, co-writer and designer for the game. Alongside this, Suda had the responsibility of acting as the studio's CEO, so he felt responsible for ensuring everyone got paid.

The Silver Case was a success in Japan and helped establish Grasshopper Manufacture, although had limited critical success due to the proliferation of its visual novel style at the time. Suda's next game at Grasshopper Manufacture was Flower, Sun, and Rain, developed for the PlayStation 2. As with The Silver Case, Suda directed, wrote and designed for the game. Flower, Sun, and Rain was almost cancelled when ASCII Entertainment changed its policies and withdrew funding. Suda pitched to other publishers, eventually gaining the support of Victor Interactive Software. This would begin a trend for Grasshopper Manufacture of picking new publishers for each projects so as to remain an independent company. Suda next acted as a producer and designer for Michigan: Report from Hell. Suda also created the initial concept around the idea of mist, but then created the camera-based and monstrous aspects to evoke terror.

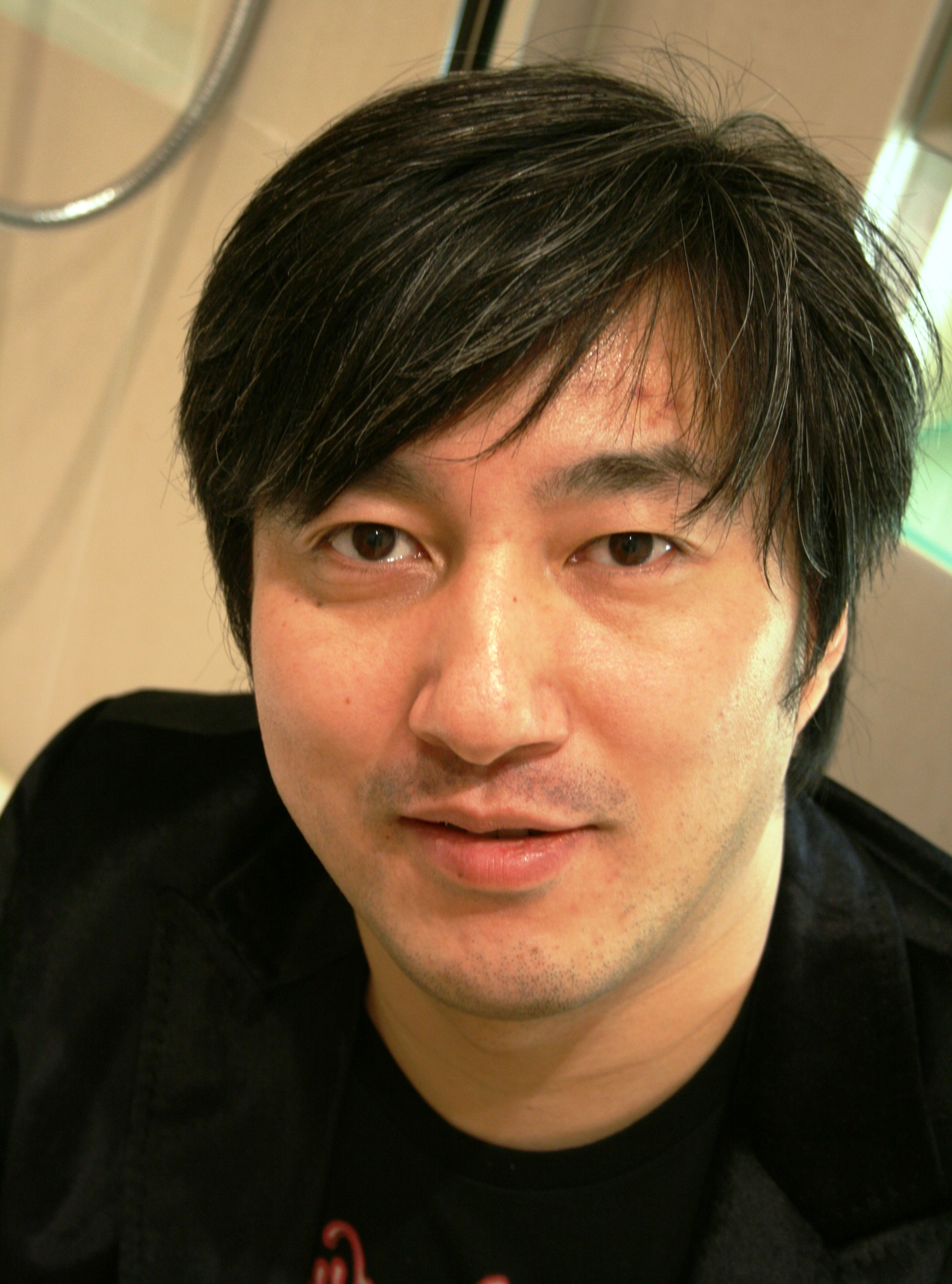
Suda in 2008

His next title, Killer7, was his breakout title in the West and garnered mainstream public attention for both Suda and his studio. Suda acted as scenario writer, designer and director. Development began in 2002 as part of a pentalogy of video games dubbed the Capcom Five, a set of games overseen by Shinji Mikami and intended to be exclusive to the GameCube. Suda was given high creative freedom by Mikami, allowing Suda to create an experimental game for an international audience. His next major title was No More Heroes for the Wii, which further established Suda's international reputation. Suda developed the title for the Wii as he had been one of the first to see the hardware first-hand, and saw the possibilities of the Wii controls for sword-based action. While sharing elements with Killer7, Suda adopted a lighter tone and style to suit his vision for the characters and story. Following No More Heroes, Suda took on a supervisory role for the majority of future Grasshopper projects including the No More Heroes sequel Desperate Struggle. He continued to be involved with writing and planning for Shadows of the Damned, Lollipop Chainsaw, Black Knight Sword and Killer is Dead. Suda returned as a director for the next two titles in the No More Heroes series; the spin-off Travis Strikes Again (2019), and the third and intended final mainline entry No More Heroes III (2021).

=== Collaborative work ===
Alongside his original work, Suda collaborated with other companies and video game creators on a variety of original and licensed projects. He directed and wrote the video games Blood+: One Night Kiss and Samurai Champloo: Sidetracked for Bandai Namco. According to him, depending on the type of project an exterior studio wants, elements unique to Suda and Grasshopper may be present or toned down in their licensed projects. Suda collaborated with Mikami on both Killer7 and Shadows of the Damned, with the former proving the better experience. He later attributed much of the design and scenario concept for Shadows of the Damned to Massimo Guarini, including the in-game weapon character Big Boner. He collaborated on Lollipop Chainsaw with American writer-director James Gunn, who co-wrote the script with Suda and helped extensively with the English version. Suda's guidance in the studio is credited with helping the company balance its original work with licensed collaborations, and prominent staff from other companies joining Grasshopper.

Suda was one of four major Japanese developers to contribute to the compilation video game Guild01 alongside Yoot Saito, Yasumi Matsuno and Yoshiyuki Hirai: Suda's contribution, Liberation Maiden, later released as a standalone title and spawning a visual novel sequel written by Suda. Suda worked as a designer, co-director and co-writer on Fatal Frame: Mask of the Lunar Eclipse, the fourth entry in the Fatal Frame series. The project was a collaboration between Tecmo Koei, Grasshopper Manufacture and Nintendo SPD. Suda and Grasshopper also collaborated on Short Peace, a media project involving four anime shorts and a video game titled Ranko Tsukigime's Longest Day: all properties within Short Peace shared a common theme of representing different periods of Japanese history and culture. Suda created the initial concept, then gave the project to Tokyo Jungle producer Yohei Kataoka, having been impressed by Tokyo Jungle and wanting someone who could do "crazy" work. Outside gaming, Suda collaborated with Hideo Kojima as scenario writer for Sdatcher, a radio drama based on Kojima's early video game Snatcher.

== Works ==
Year	Title	Role	Ref.
1993	Super Fire Pro Wrestling 3 Final Bout	Director	
1994	Super Fire Pro Wrestling Special	Director, writer	
1996	Twilight Syndrome: Search	Director	
1996	Twilight Syndrome: Investigation	Director	
1997	Moonlight Syndrome	Director, writer	
1999	The Silver Case	Director, writer	
2001	Flower, Sun, and Rain	Director, writer	
2004	Michigan: Report from Hell	Original plan, producer	
2005	Killer7	Director, designer, writer	
2005	The 25th Ward: The Silver Case	Director, writer	
2006	Samurai Champloo: Sidetracked	Director, writer	
2006	Contact	Producer	
2006	Blood+: One Night Kiss	Director, writer	
2007	No More Heroes	Director, designer, writer	
2008	Fatal Frame: Mask of the Lunar Eclipse	Director, writer	
2010	No More Heroes 2: Desperate Struggle	Executive director	
2011	Frog Minutes	Executive producer	
2011	Shadows of the Damned	Executive director, writer	
2011	Rebuild of Evangelion: Sound Impact	Creative producer	
2011	Sdatcher (Radio Drama)	Writer, voice actor	
2012	Sine Mora	Executive producer	
2012	Diabolical Pitch	Executive producer	
2012	Liberation Maiden	Creative director	
2012	Lollipop Chainsaw	Creative director	
2012	No More Heroes: World Ranker	Producer	
2012	Black Knight Sword	Executive producer, writer	
2013	Killer Is Dead	Executive director, writer	
2013	Liberation Maiden SIN	Writer	
2014	Ranko Tsukigime's Longest Day	Writer	
2015	Tokio of the Moon's Shadow	Writer	
2015	Kurayami Dance	Writer	
2016	Let It Die	Executive director	
2017	Sine Mora EX	Executive director	
2019	Travis Strikes Again: No More Heroes	Director, producer, writer	
2020	Fire Pro Wrestling World	The Vanishing scenario writer	
2021	No More Heroes III	Director, writer	
2025	Hotel Barcelona	Original idea	
2026	Romeo is a Dead Man	Director, producer, writer, scenario	

== Design philosophy and influences ==
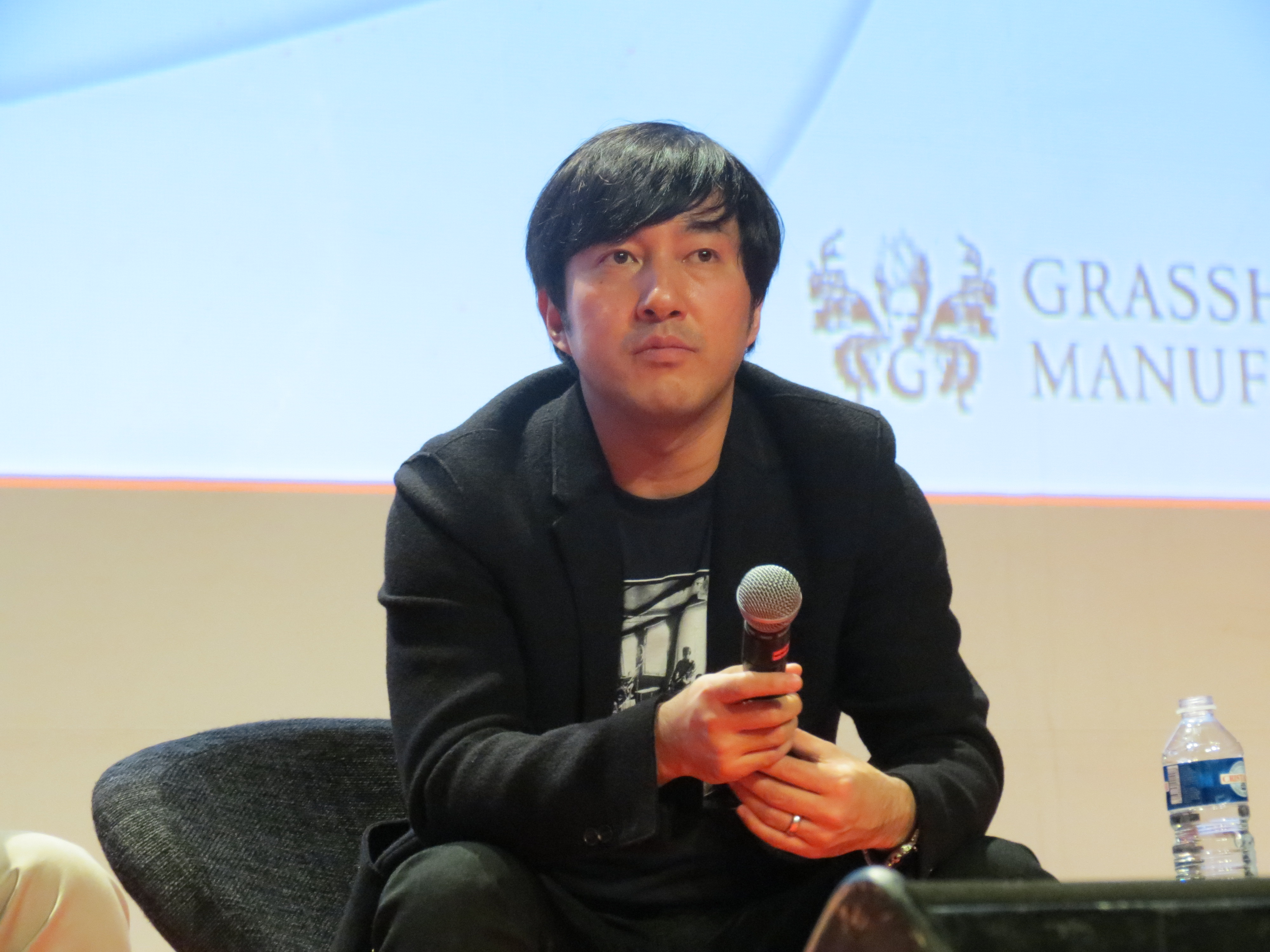
Goichi Suda at Toulouse Game Show in 2012

Suda's style of writing and direction has been compared by game journalists to the work of Quentin Tarantino. During his work on The Silver Case, he paid great attention to the opening's editing, something which confused and annoyed other staff members. Suda has stated in numerous interviews that his work is inspired by "punk", referring to the breaking of traditional game rules rather than the music genre. In explaining this concept, Suda said that many games were basically "copycats", mimicking other successful titles in their gameplay and themes rather than striving for something groundbreaking or unconventional. His game design philosophy was influenced by innovative games from his childhood developed by North America and Europe, as the Japanese market at the time seemed lacking in variety. While the term "punk" is generally associated with punk rock music in Japan, Suda used the word in its ideological sense, breaking the mold on accepted conventions and deliberately making games outside current trends. Following this philosophy, Suda dislikes making games based on other people's concepts, instead preferring his own concepts and designs. Despite taking on a less involved role with later titles due to the growing demands of his position as company CEO, Suda continues to seek deeper involvement with projects.

Multiple sources have influenced Suda's work, from literature to games to foreign and domestic films and television. His favorite author is Franz Kafka, a German language author who focused on a combination of mundane and surreal scenarios. Suda's liking of Kafka was originally expressed in Kurayami, an in-development title based on The Castle, with a focus on nighttime combat and survival. Kurayami would eventually evolve into Shadows of the Damned. Numerous films have inspired elements of Suda's work on The Silver Case, Killer7 and the No More Heroes series. When creating Lollipop Chainsaw, Suda used the series Buffy the Vampire Slayer to flesh out his initial concept. Popular culture has also played a part in Suda's work, with several characters in his games being named after or being homages to sports people or pop singers. He also draws inspiration from and references a number of rock bands including The Stranglers and The Smiths.

A defining part of Suda's original work has been its balance of humor, dark or mature themes, violence and sexuality. His focus on death is because he feels it needs a rationale behind it, and so he focuses on those closely tied with death such as assassins. In his action titles, he considered the reasons behind each character's wish to fight and the reason for their deaths. His portrayal of death in his games was influenced by his time as an undertaker. Sexuality, while a big part of many of Suda's works, is not an important element from his perspective, and when used he is attempting to express a core part of the overall story and theme; some elements of his later work had him worried that Grasshopper and himself would become associated with erotic content. Another recurring theme in his work from The Silver Case onwards is the focus on the criminal elements in society, in addition to people with equally valid views coming into conflict with each other. Following the serious tone of The Silver Case, Flower, Sun, and Rain saw a stylistic shift to a more light and casual tone. This approach of switching styles for each successive original project would be repeated by Suda throughout his career: when talking about the contrast between Lollipop Chainsaw and Killer is Dead he described it as a yin-yang effect.

During the early part of his career, Suda worked on adventure games without an emphasis on action. This was due to his previous work at Human Entertainment being in the adventure game and visual novel genres. Due to having a larger staff, Flower, Sun, and Rain shifted away from the text-drive style of The Silver Case, beginning the company's and Suda's shift towards more action-based gameplay. Beginning with Killer7, Suda incorporated further action elements at Mikami's insistence. This shift in style continued following the anime tie-ins, with the gameplay of Sidetracked and One Night Kiss directly inspiring him when designing the action gameplay of No More Heroes. Michigan: Report from Hell and Fatal Frame: Mask of the Lunar Eclipse are the only titles Suda directly worked on to focus on horror, a genre Suda generally dislikes.

Some of his work has seen outside interference from publishers. His original scenario for Blood+, where the protagonist would be a monster clone killed at the end of the story, was vetoed. The overtly sexual elements in Lollipop Chainsaw and Killer Is Dead were likewise not his decision, but rather included at the insistence of the Japanese publisher Kadokawa Games. Shadows of the Damned in particular suffered from creative clashes with the publisher Electronic Arts, who requested changes catering to the Western market such as incorporating guns, and required five redrafts of the scenario before they approved it. Suda and Mikami both disliked the end product due to the publisher's creative interference, with Mikami in particular saying that Shadows of the Damned's final form broke Suda's heart.
