= Killer7 =

2005 video game

- North American PS2 cover art featuring (clockwise from upper right) Garcian, Coyote, Kaede, Kevin, Con, Dan, and Mask de Smith. Harman Smith appears behind the logo.
- Developers: Grasshopper Manufacture; Capcom Production Studio 4 (Note: Windows version developed by Engine Software)
- Publishers: Capcom (GC, PS2); NIS America (PC)
- Director: Goichi Suda
- Producer: Hiroyuki Kobayashi
- Designer: Goichi Suda
- Programmer: Satoshi Kawakami
- Artist: Akihiko Ishizaka
- Writers: Goichi Suda; Shinji Mikami
- Composers: Masafumi Takada; Jun Fukuda
- Engine: RenderWare (PS2)
- Platforms: GameCube; PlayStation 2 Windows
- Release: GameCube, PlayStation 2: JP: June 9, 2005; NA: July 5, 2005; PAL: July 15, 2005; Windows: WW: November 15, 2018
- Genres: Action-adventure, first-person shooter
- Mode: Single-player

Killer7 (Note: Japanese: キラー7 (Note: Oftentimes seen with a space as Killer 7), Hepburn: Kirā Sebun) is a 2005 action-adventure game developed by Grasshopper Manufacture and Capcom and published by Capcom for the GameCube and PlayStation 2. The game was written and directed by Goichi Suda and produced by Hiroyuki Kobayashi.

The game follows an elite group of assassins called the "Killer7". The assassins, physical manifestations of a man named Harman Smith, perform hits on behalf of the United States government. Through these missions, the killer7 uncover a deeper conspiracy regarding the role of Japan in U.S. politics and secrets about the nature of their organization. Killer7 features first-person shooter elements and a unique on rails control scheme with camera controls seemingly inspired by the Resident Evil series, but the core adventure-style gameplay has been compared to Myst and Snatcher.

Killer7 was Suda's first game released outside Japan. It initially received mixed reviews due to its unconventional control scheme, linear gameplay, and complex noir plot. While some reviewers appreciated the stripped-down controls and stylized arthouse approach, others criticised it as confusing and restricting. However, the game's soundtrack, presentation, visual style and thought-provoking story received generally positive responses from critics, were considered as the best aspects of the game and led to several accolades and nominations. Retrospectively, Killer7 has a cult following, which led to re-releases of Suda's older works and the successful launch of No More Heroes. A Windows port of the game licensed by Capcom was released by NIS America in 2018.

== Gameplay ==
The player battles enemies called Heaven Smiles in first-person view. The head-up display on the left indicates the player's health (the eye), weapon charge level, number of vials of thin blood, and amount of collected thick blood.

The player controls the on-screen character, a member of the killer7 group, from a third-person view using the gamepad. The gameplay consists of elements of first-person shooter and action-adventure game with restricted movement (i.e. "on rails")—rather than allowing free motion, the game limits the on-screen character to predetermined paths through the environment. The on-screen character moves forward by holding a button and reverses direction with another button press. At intersections, the player may choose which path to take. Progress is made by navigating the environment and solving puzzles. Some puzzles require the talents of a specific killer7 member. The player may switch between available members via a menu in the pause screen at any time; not all personalities may be awake at a start of a mission, and requires defeating a number of enemies before they can be awakened. Other puzzles require magical rings or other items collected throughout the game.

Combat in Killer7 occurs when the player encounters enemies called "Heaven Smiles". Smiles announce their presence with a laughing sound effect and are initially invisible. The player must switch to a first-person viewpoint and scan the surroundings to reveal Smiles. While in first-person view, movement is disabled and the analog stick aims the character's gun. Targeting specific body parts will disable them; for example, shooting off a leg will cause a Smile to fall to the ground and crawl toward the player. The player may aim for a "critical point" that instantly destroys the Smile. Smiles that get too close will explode and injure the character. If a character dies, players can use Garcian Smith to retrieve the fallen character's head and bring them back to life; if Garcian dies, then the game ends.

Defeated Smiles yield "thick blood" and "thin blood". Thin blood is used to recover the characters' stamina and fuel special abilities. Thick blood functions similarly to experience points, and players gain more by shooting Smiles' critical points. The player may redeem thick blood for "serum" while in "Harman's Room", checkpoints that appear throughout the game. Serum is used to improve the attributes of the characters such as "power" and "speed". This also unlocks special abilities for the characters. Players may save their game in designated Harman's Rooms.

Completing the game unlocks a new difficulty called Killer8 where the character Young Harman (a young version of Harman Smith) can be played along with the original seven personalities. Killer8 is more difficult than the original mode with most enemies able to kill the player with one attack. Completing Killer8 unlocks a comical Hopper7 mode where the first level can be replayed with weaker enemies that wear grasshopper masks, mirroring the logo for the game's developer Grasshopper Manufacture.

== Story ==
=== Setting ===
Killer7 takes place in an alternate version of Earth in the early 21st century. After a treaty ends all international conflict, the world powers destroy all nuclear weapons by firing them into the upper atmosphere and intercepting them with other missiles. This event becomes known as "Fireworks" and symbolizes world peace to the general populace. In an effort to combat terrorism, pandemic disease, and cyberterrorism, the International Ethics Committee (IEC) shuts down all air travel and public use of the Internet. Air transportation is replaced by a system of intercontinental expressways. However, a new terrorist group called "Heaven Smile" appears, targeting the United Nations (UN) and IEC. The members of Heaven Smile are humans who have been infected with a virus that evokes a desire to kill. Factory-produced Smiles are given a "bomb-organ" that allows them to explode at will, their principal means of attack.

In this Earth, Japanese politics are dominated by two parties: the UN Party and the Liberal Party. The UN Party is more powerful and moves to end the Asian Security Treaty and sever ties with the United States. The UN Party seized control of the Japanese government through the wisdom of the "Yakumo Cabinet Policy", a secret document which details how to run the "ideal nation". It was written by the Union 7, young members of the Liberal Party who left to found the UN Party. The US government is also eager to sever relations with Japan, seeing the country as a hindrance and of little economic value. The interaction between Japan and the US is a central source of conflict in Killer7.

=== Characters ===
The player controls the members of a group of assassins called the "killer7." The group is led by an elderly man in a wheelchair named Harman Smith (Dwight Schultz), who exhibits "Multifoliate Personae Phenomenon". This condition allows him to physically transform into one of his seven assassin personae:

- African-American Garcian Smith (Greg Eagles).
- Aggressive Irish-American Dan Smith (Michael Gough).
- Japanese-American female Kaede Smith (Tara Strong).
- White British mute Kevin Smith.
- Mestizo Puerto Rican Coyote Smith (Benito Martinez).
- Young Chinese-American Con Smith (Jun Hee Lee).
- Mexican-American luchador Mask de Smith (Miguel Caballero).

These people were gifted killers in life and Harman absorbed their souls through his condition after their deaths. The killer7 were temporarily incapacitated in an incident 50 years ago, in which the members of the group were systematically tracked and killed while performing a job at the Union Hotel in Pennsylvania. Garcian, whose power is to revive fallen personae, became the dominant personality as a result. In this capacity, he receives orders from the frail Harman when his consciousness is "awake" and accepts jobs from Christopher Mills (Bart Flynn), who hires the killer7 on behalf of the US government. Multifoliate Personae Phenomenon also causes Harman and his personae to see "remnant psyches"—ghosts of their past victims. Iwazaru, a man in a bondage suit, and Travis Bell, the killer7's first target, are the main remnant psyches who aid them throughout the game. The primary antagonist is an old friend of Harman's named Kun Lan (Joe Lala). He has the "Hand of God", a supernatural power that produces the Heaven Smile virus.

=== Plot ===
The game opens with a conversation between Garcian Smith and Christopher Mills about a new job for the killer7. The assassins battle their way to the top of a building which has become infested with Heaven Smiles. Harman confronts the source of the Smiles, an angel-like figure, but she is merely Kun Lan's puppet. Harman and Kun Lan discuss the current state of the world before the mission ends. In the subsequent missions, the killer7 target a number of individuals on behalf of the US government or for personal reasons. They kill Andrei Ulmeyda (Cam Clarke), a Texan postal worker who established a successful company based on the Yakumo, when he becomes infected with the Heaven Smile virus. Dan Smith confronts Curtis Blackburn (Alastair Duncan), his former mentor and murderer, when Mills informs the group that Blackburn is running an organ smuggling business that targets young girls. Their penultimate mission pits them against the "Handsome Men", a group of sentai rangers who assassinate a US politician.

The central plot arc concerns the true nature of US–Japan relations. After a volley of 200 intercontinental ballistic missiles are fired at Japan, the US government contracts the killer7 to eliminate Toru Fukushima (Jim Ward), the head of the UN Party. However, an assassin posing as Fukushima's secretary kills him first in an attempt to reclaim the Yakumo document for the Liberal Party, believing its wisdom would help the party to regain political power. Shortly thereafter, Kenjiro "Matsuken" Matsuoka (Steve Blum) kills two senior members of the UN Party to become its new leader, under the influence of Kun Lan. In the end, the killer7 defeat the two UN Party members who had been reanimated by Kun Lan as Japan is destroyed by the missiles.

In their final mission, the killer7 seek Matsuken, who leads the 10 million UN Party members who live in the US. The government fears that if they converge on a single state, they could win a seat in the United States Senate. Garcian travels to Coburn Elementary School near Seattle, Washington and discovers tapes that reveal the school as a front for the UN Party to train children as assassins. The tapes focus on Emir Parkreiner, a gifted killer trained at the school. Garcian learns that Japan uses Coburn to control the vote of the US presidential election. The assassins battle a group of invincible Smiles and all but Garcian are incapacitated. Garcian travels to the Union Hotel where he witnesses visions of the other members being killed in their rooms. At the top, he discovers that his true identity is Emir Parkreiner, the one who killed the killer7 at the Union Hotel over 50 years ago. Following that incident, Harman absorbed Emir as a persona and Emir's memories were lost.

Three years later, Garcian, now living as Emir, arrives at Battleship Island in Japan to destroy the last Heaven Smile. He meets with Matsuken, who presents Garcian with a choice: let him live, which allows Japan to mount an assault on the US; or kill him, which lets the US discover Japan's role in rigging American elections—US forces destroy Japan's last stronghold, Battleship Island, in retaliation and wipe Japan off the map. Regardless of the player's choice, Garcian finds that the last Heaven Smile is Iwazaru, whose real identity is Kun Lan, and kills him. However, Harman and Kun Lan are revealed to be immortal beings, representing a dialectic struggle between good and evil, which persists a century in the future in Shanghai as they continue their eternal battle.

== Development ==
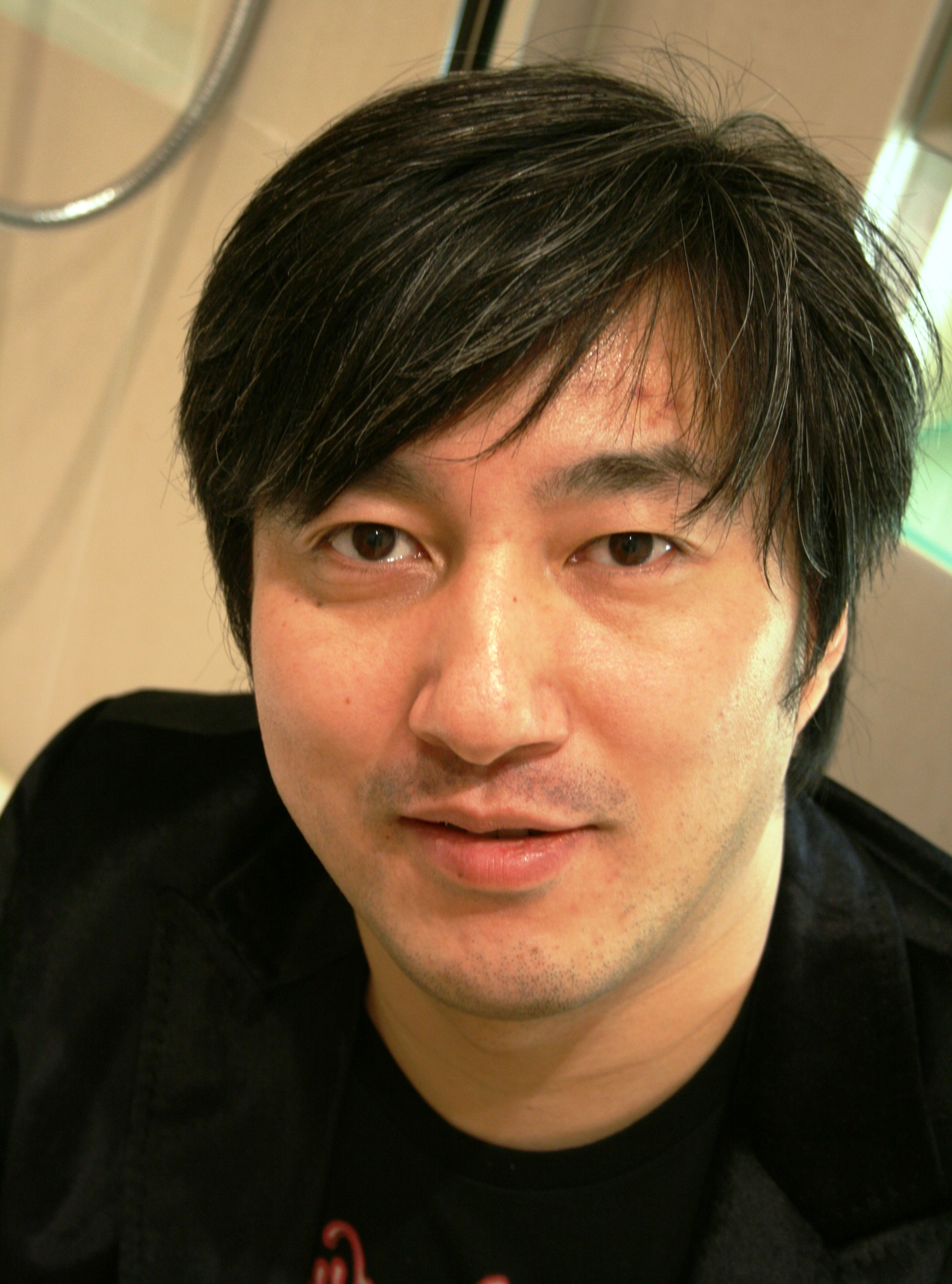
Goichi Suda, also known as Suda51, wrote, designed, and directed Killer7, which he considers his proudest achievement.

Development for Killer7 began in mid-2002 and revealed mostly in 2003 as part of the Capcom Five,a set of games overseen by Shinji Mikami and intended to be exclusive to the GameCube. Capcom produced the games to bring new intellectual property to the video game industry, which the company viewed as stagnant. Killer7's gameplay mechanics were finalized late in development because most resources went to story and visual work. Director Suda51 wrote the scenario based on a plot he conceived together with Mikami, and later decided on the unconventional control scheme as a deconstruction of how gamers play and to "create new expression". Complex controls and combos were omitted to present a system that fosters easy progression for the player. Producer Hiroyuki Kobayashi described the controls as "intuitive" and stated that the team wanted players to "think when they are playing" so they can enjoy the mystery in the story. The long development process culminated in several delays, the last of which was due to an artistic desire to release the game on July 7 (7/7). The game was finally released on July 5, two days earlier than previously stated.

A lot of the content in Killer7 was cut due to feedback from both Mikami and internal testing. About 2/3 of the map size and plot were drastically reduced and according to Suda, the cinematics in total was three hours long as opposed to the now one-hour duration. Of all the Smiths in the game, Coyote is Suda's favorite because of his backstory, but like with other elements, it had to be cut halfway in development.

Suda51 drew influence from film noir, particularly the theme of multiple personality disorder, and called Killer7 a "hardboiled action-adventure". Hiro Sugiyama, Peter Saville, and American comic book artists, such as Adrian Tomine, inspired the artistic design and aesthetic. Suda51 noted the inclusion of cel animation in Western and Japanese anime styles was meant to legitimize video games as an art form by competing with traditional art forms in their stage. The game's anime sequences were created by Xebec, while the CGI sequences were handled by Digital Frontier. Kobayashi commented that Killer7 is "styled more as an interactive story than a traditional game." Suda also drew from yakuza film Battles Without Honor and Humanity: Hiroshima Deathmatch. His experience as an undertaker had a powerful effect on the portrayal of death in his games. The game reflects his interest in professional wrestling; Suda51 included a luchador character, Mask de Smith, and conducted interviews and attended promotional events while wearing a wrestling mask. He named the Smith Syndicate after his favorite band the Smiths. Reflecting on his work, Suda51 considers Killer7 his proudest achievement.

== Reception and legacy ==
Reception

Aggregate scores
Aggregator	Score
GameRankings	(GC) 76.78% (PS2) 70.11% (PC) 81.75%
Metacritic	(GC) 74/100 (PS2) 70 of 100 (PC) 78/100

Review scores
Publication	Score
1Up.com	B−
Edge	8/10
Famitsu	36/40
GamePro	1.5/5 (PS2)
GameSpot	8.3/10
GameTrailers	6.1/10
IGN	8.1/10
Nintendo Power	8.5/10

Killer7 received divided reviews and sparked debates about depictions of sex and violence in video games and the status of video games as art. James Mielke of 1UP.com likened the game's high-contrast art style to noir and neo-noir film such as Se7en. He found that despite poor pacing and stilted gameplay, the "quirky scripting and edgy plot" were strong draws, and called Killer7 one of the "most artfully designed footnotes in gaming history". Edge magazine's reviewers echoed this sentiment and predicted that the game would "[pave the way] for future creative leeway", crediting the director with an unwavering artistic vision. Eurogamer's Kristan Reed was keenly aware of the game's limited appeal, calling it "a concept game, an arthouse game, a simple game, an often beautiful game, but most certainly never an everyman's game".

Virtually all aspects of the game had their proponents and detractors. Greg Kasavin of GameSpot praised the unity of "great-looking camera work with simple controls" and compared its "thought-provoking" storyline to Metal Gear Solid, while a GamePro reviewer criticized those features, calling the controls limited, the cel-shading dull, and the story incoherent. Kasavin complimented the game's eclectic soundtrack, excellent voice acting, and distinctive sound effects, while the GamePro reviewer panned them as minimalist and irritating. IGN's Matt Casamassina likened the control scheme to "old-school adventure games like Myst and Snatcher" and commended Suda51 for making a "cult hit", "erupting with style, mood and undiluted craziness". Casamassina was also impressed by the quality of the anime-style cutscenes featured in the latter half of the game.

The IGN, GameSpot, and GameSpy reviews noted the GameCube version features superior graphics, substantially faster loading times, and more responsive controls than the PlayStation 2 version, resulting in lower scores for the latter. Nevertheless, IGN called it the 94th best PlayStation 2 game. Nintendo Power claimed that Killer7 is a "highly rewarding" experience for dedicated gamers. Nintendo World Report writer Karl Castaneda also remarked that, despite repetitive gameplay, it was "still fun". Charles Herold of The New York Times was less forgiving and commented that the lack of new features beyond the first hour made the remaining experience boring and annoying.

Despite its mixed reception, a number of video game publications recognized Killer7's unconventional gameplay and innovative style. At GameSpot's "Best and Worst of 2005" awards, the game was nominated for Best Story, Best GameCube Game, Most Outrageous Game, Most Gratuitous Use of F------ Swearing, and won Best New Character (Harman Smith) and Most Innovative Game. IGN similarly nominated it for Game of the Year, Most Innovative Design, and Best Artistic Design and awarded it Best Adventure Game, Best Story, and Best Game No One Played. IGN later named Killer7 the 20th best GameCube game of all time. The game had a large presence at the 2005 Nintendo Power Awards, winning Best New Character (Harman Smith).

In August 2005, Jack Thompson, an activist who campaigned against video games, demanded that the Entertainment Software Rating Board (ESRB) change its rating for Killer7 from "M" (for Mature, ages 17 and up) to "AO" (for Adults Only, ages 18 and up). He cited Casamassina's review of the game at IGN, claiming that "full-blown sex sequences" present in the game would be harmful to minors. Casamassina rebutted that the scene in question involved two fully clothed adults and that a similar scene in a film would garner "only a PG-13 or, worst, R-rating".

Reviewers quickly identified Killer7 as a cult game with limited appeal. IGN lamented that its experimental style was not conducive to high sales, naming it GameCube's Best Game No One Played in their 2005 awards. IGN's Casamassina later placed it fourth in his Top 10 Tuesday: Underrated and Underappreciated Games feature. Despite modest sales, Killer7's cult success prompted the development of remakes of Suda51's older Japan-only games, The Silver Case and Flower, Sun, and Rain. In 2007, Grasshopper Manufacture released Suda51's No More Heroes to critical and commercial success. In addition to an original soundtrack and comic book adaptation, Capcom published Hand in killer7, a companion book that explains the plot in more depth. Kinetic Underground, the company that handled the comic book, also released a number of figurines depicting characters from the game. Dan Smith later made a guest appearance in Suda51's 2019 game Travis Strikes Again: No More Heroes. The 2021 Nintendo 3DS game Gal Galaxy Pain features a laugh in homage to Heaven Smiles that can be heard during the game over screen and when hovering over the game's icon on the 3DS home menu.

== Related media ==
=== Music ===
Killer7 Original Sound Track

Soundtrack album by Masafumi Takada and Jun Fukuda
- Released: June 20, 2005
- Genre: Video game soundtrack
- Length: Disc 1: 59:48; Disc 2: 71:21
- Label: Scitron Digital Contents

Killer7 Original Sound Track was released on June 20, 2005, by Scitron Digital Contents. It features 55 compositions by Masafumi Takada and 6 by Jun Fukuda across two discs. Takada put a large emphasis on ambient music due to the genre's ability to draw in the player. He called his soundtrack a "translation of the text" of the game and sought to retell the story through music. Carolyn Gudmundson of GamesRadar praised the soundtrack's varied style, a "moody, atmosphereric base punctuated with spikes of manic energy". She singled out "Rave On", a track heard before mini-boss battles, as an excellent example of the latter. GameSpy's Phil Theobald had similar compliments for "Rave On" and other more subdued pieces that slowly "work [their] way into your mind".

Takada said in a 2008 interview that Killer7 is his favourite own soundtrack.

=== Comic book ===
In 2006, Devil's Due Publishing released a comic book adaptation of Killer7, written and drawn by Kinetic Underground staff. The planned 12-issue limited series was cancelled after four issues. Players who preordered Killer7 through EB Games received a special "Issue #0" as a bonus, and "Issue #½" was available at the 2005 San Diego Comic-Con. Writer Arvid Nelson described the story as a "mutant cross-breeding of John Woo and Quentin Tarantino", and Devil's Due President Josh Blaylock commented that Killer7's style was perfect for the comic book medium. In adapting the game, Nelson admitted that the plot was streamlined to maintain a comprehensible story, but noted that the "video game doesn't spoon-feed you information ... That's how the comic's going to be, too".

== Possible sequel ==
Since its inception, fans have been anticipating a Killer7 sequel. Suda made it clear that it will "probably never happen" as Capcom holds the rights to the IP. In a 2010 interview, he exclaimed that Killer7 is "part of his soul" and is certainly interested in making a sequel.

In 2012, Suda revealed a new game titled Killer Is Dead; word quickly spread that it was a follow-up to Killer7 since the game shares similar concept with an assassin protagonist, complex plot and cel-shaded graphics. Suda51 later clarified that Killer Is Dead is an original game and has no relation to Killer7.

During a panel at 2016's PAX East, Suda expressed his interest to remaster Killer7 and has begun talks with the game's publisher, Capcom. On March 17, 2018, during HOPPER'S Vol. 5 an event celebrating Grasshopper Manufacture's 20th anniversary, Suda verbally announced to attendees that there are plans to remaster both Killer7 and Flower, Sun, and Rain. However no platform or release date was mentioned. Suda later posted on his Twitter account stating that the Killer7 remaster will be out within 10 years. At the 2018 MomoCon, Suda announced a remastered version of Killer7 for Windows which was released on November 15, 2018.

In October 2024, when speaking about the then-recently released Shadows of the Damned: Hella Remastered, Mikami said he would rather remake Killer7 than remastering Shadows of the Damned. However, he was sceptical about it, believing that if the remake were to replicate the visuals from the original, it may not appeal to modern audiences who want realistic graphics, which is not what Killer7 is about.

== Citations ==
- Suda, Goichi (August 2005). Hand in killer7. Capcom. ISBN 978-4-575-16444-2.
