= The Silver Case =

1999 video game

- PlayStation cover art
- Developer: Grasshopper Manufacture
- Publisher: ASCII Entertainment (Note: Windows, macOS, and Linux versions published by Grasshopper Manufacture; PlayStation 4 version published by Nippon Ichi Software in Japan and by NIS America internationally; Nintendo Switch version published by Playism in Japan and by NIS America internationally.)
- Director: Goichi Suda
- Producer: Hiroyuki Tamura
- Designer: Goichi Suda
- Programmers: Yuichi Ogawa; Masashi Niwano; Toshihiro Fujikawa
- Artist: Takashi Miyamoto
- Writers: Goichi Suda; Masahi Ooka; Sako Kato
- Composer: Masafumi Takada
- Engine: Unity (HD Remaster)
- Platforms: PlayStation, Windows, macOS, PlayStation 4, Linux, Nintendo Switch
- Release: October 7, 1999: PlayStation; JP: October 7, 1999 Windows; WW: October 7, 2016 macOS; WW: November 7, 2016 PlayStation 4; NA: April 18, 2017; EU: April 21, 2017; JP: March 15, 2018 Linux; WW: August 1, 2017 Nintendo Switch; JP: February 18, 2021; NA: July 6, 2021; EU: July 9, 2021
- Genres: Adventure, visual novel
- Mode: Single-player

The Silver Case (Note: Japanese: シルバー事件, Hepburn: Shirubā Jiken) is an adventure visual novel video game developed by Grasshopper Manufacture and published by ASCII Entertainment for the PlayStation in 1999. It was directed, designed and co-written by Goichi Suda. A remastered version was released digitally by Grasshopper Manufacture worldwide for Windows and macOS in 2016. A port for the PlayStation 4 was released by NIS America in 2017; this was a physical release. A Japanese release of the PlayStation 4 version was released in March 2018 by Nippon Ichi Software. A Linux port was released in August 2017. A port for the Nintendo DS was also in development; it was never released due to Suda's dissatisfaction with the final product. A port for the Nintendo Switch was released in 2021.

The setting is contemporary Japan in the year 1999, in a universe which would be used by Suda in later works. Within a city referred to as the 24 Districts, a series of bizarre murders occurs, prompting the 24 Districts Police Department to send two detectives from their Heinous Crimes Unit to solve the case. The killings are soon linked to Kamui Uehara, a notorious serial killer who supposedly died several years before. The gameplay revolves around text-based situations, point-and-click mechanics, and interactive question and answer segments.

The Silver Case was the debut title of Grasshopper Manufacture, beginning development with the studio's formation in 1998. As they had limited staff and resources, Suda devised the window-based story-telling to make best use of their assets. The story, written by Suda, Masahi Ooka and Sako Kato, revolved around themes of crime and the clashing of people on different sides; its themes would become a recurring feature in later titles developed by Suda. The character designs were by Takashi Miyamoto, while the music was composed by Masafumi Takada.

Prior to its remaster, the game did not see a release outside Japan, despite Suda wanting a Western release; this was attributed by Suda and others to concerns over properly translating and localizing the game's dialogue and text-based puzzles. The localization was handled by Active Gaming Media in collaboration with Grasshopper Manufacture. The original version was positively reviewed in Japan, while the remaster received generally mixed opinions from journalists. A sequel for mobile devices, The 25th Ward: The Silver Case, was released in 2005; it received a remake following the success of the remaster's release.

== Gameplay ==
An event scene within The Silver Case

The Silver Case is a text-based point and click adventure visual novel video game where players take control of different characters through two linear scenarios: in the "Transmitter" scenario, players take the role of a detective solving a serial murder mystery, while in the "Placebo" scenario, they control a freelance journalist covering the investigation. The scenarios are divided into six chapters each, making a total of twelve chapters.

During gameplay sequences, the player moves through environments in first-person. Proceeding through the scenario, story events play out in special windows against a single background: some are dedicated to text, while others show scenery related to events in the game. These scenery are a combination of 2D and 3D artwork, real-world photographs incorporated into the game, limited full-motion graphics, and short live-action sequences. At some points in the game, quiz questions are shown for the player to answer, in addition to mini-games the player can complete. There are also puzzles which are strongly related to the game's text-based features and presentation.

== Synopsis ==
=== Characters and structure ===
The Silver Case revolves around two different groups of characters in Ward 24. The Heinous Crimes Unit consists of detectives Tetsugoro Kusabi, Sumio Kodai, Chizuru Hachisuka, Kiyoshi Morikawa, Morichika Nakategawa, HCU chief Shinji Kotobuki, and the rookie player character. Crossing paths with the detectives is freelance reporter Tokio Morishima. Both parties soon come into conflict with Kamui Uehara, an assassin who was involved in a brutal crime 20 years ago and is now resurfacing as a threat to order in Ward 24.

The game divides the story into two threads: "Transmitter" follows the player character, Kusabi, and the HCU as they solve crimes; while "Placebo" follows Tokio as he reports on those same crimes, whilst dealing with his own personal issues.

=== Plot ===
The Silver Case is set in the year 1999, in a fictional "Ward 24" of Tokyo, Japan. A series of mysterious and bizarre murders have surfaced, prompting the Heinous Crimes Unit (HCU) of the 24 Wards Police Department to investigate. They find that the murders closely match the profile of an infamous serial killer, Kamui Uehara, who assassinated many key government figures during the "Silver Case" of 1979, which officially ended with Kusabi arresting Uehara. Uehara was held in a mental hospital and was thought to be completely unfit to commit crime again, but these new incidents imply otherwise.

== Development ==
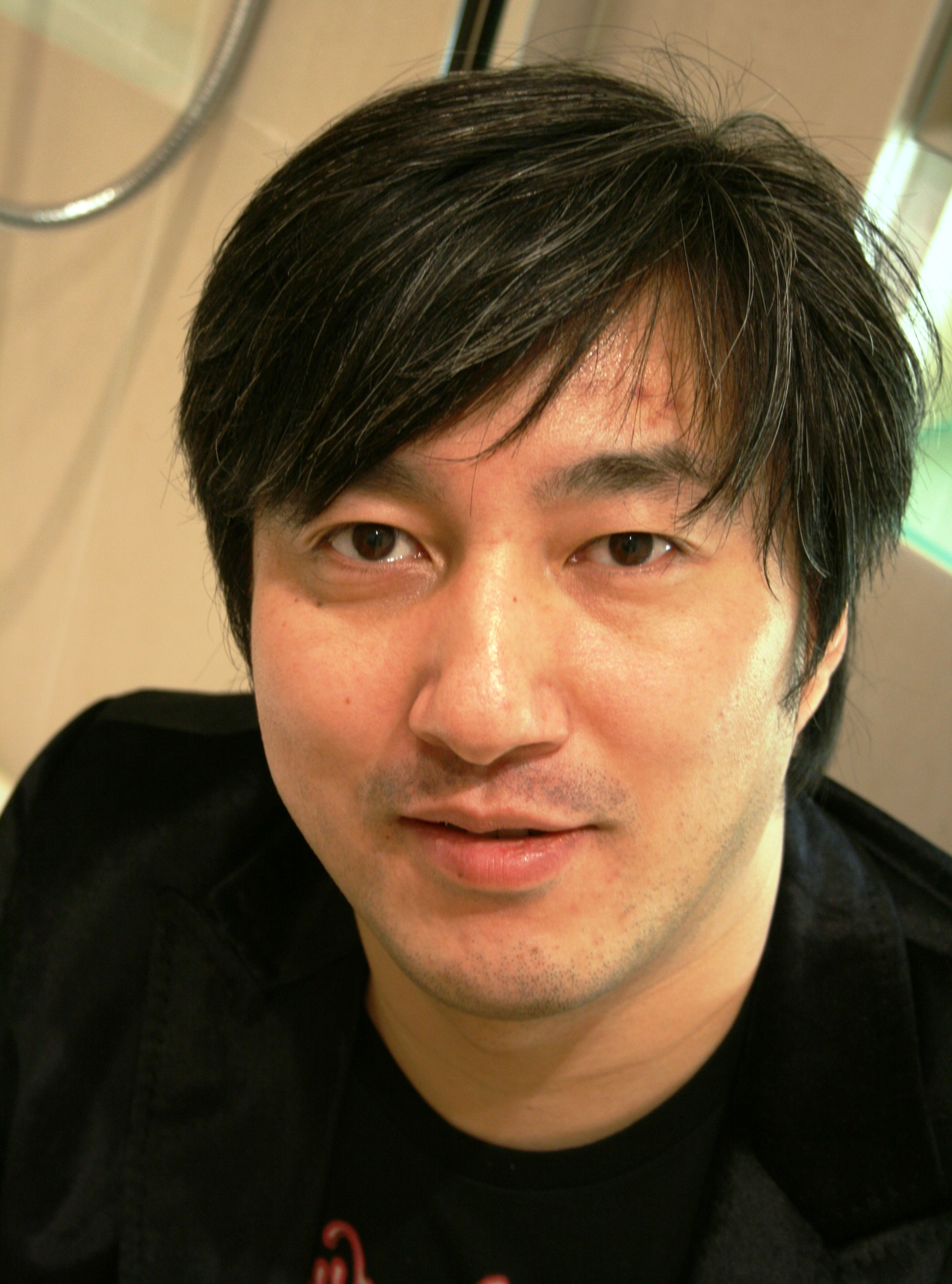
Goichi Suda, who would come to be known as Suda51, directed, designed and co-wrote The Silver Case. The story's themes would appear in Suda's later works.

The Silver Case was the debut title of Grasshopper Manufacture, a then-independent company formed in 1998 by video game developer Goichi Suda after leaving Human Entertainment following the completion of Moonlight Syndrome, a spin-off from Human's Twilight Syndrome series. The Silver Case, and consequently Grasshopper Manufacture, was born from Suda's wish to create something original, having only worked on pre-existing projects for Human. While the development team was independent, the production itself was supported by the game's publisher ASCII Entertainment, who had initially suggested a collaboration with Suda when he left Human, and whom Suda had approached with the concept for The Silver Case following the formation of Grasshopper Manufacture. When the genre had been selected, Suda's main challenge was to create something different from any other game in the genre. During development, the team was faced with severe financial restrictions, which further exacerbated the problems caused by a small staff as they could not produce all the art assets normally needed for such a game. To compensate, Suda created what he termed the "film window engine": illustrations and text were relegated to dedicated windows. This allowed development to continue. Story sequences were also communicated through 3D CGI and inserted live-action and anime sequences.

It was developed for the PlayStation with a five-person team, who created the basic core of the game. During the last six months of development, the team expanded to include ten people. Suda acted as both director and designer in addition to other duties, partially due to the constricted nature of development. The character designs were done by Takashi Miyamoto, who would go on to work on Grasshopper Manufacture's following title Flower, Sun, and Rain. His design was influenced by a large range of media, from books to films and television: many of those he used for influence for The Silver Case crossed over with Suda's own tastes. His drawing style was meant to be realistic, rather than in line with typical manga illustrations of the time.

When designing the characters, both Suda and Miyamoto had creative input: Suda would explain the characters to Miyamoto and show him fashion magazines to demonstrate the style of clothing he wanted each character to have, then Miyamoto would create his own vision and make his own choices about clothing. The two would then agree on a middle ground and Miyamoto would then create the character illustrations. His dark artistic style was a conscious emulation of film noir. He incorporated general visual references to multiple films including Metropolis, Gattaca, Heat, and Seven. While it was set in the then-present day of 1999, it incorporated futuristic concepts drawn from the works of William Gibson. Suda told him to design characters Morikawa and Kotobuki to be like characters from the television series Taiyō ni Hoero!. The music was composed by Masafumi Takada, who would go on to work extensively in the video game industry and contribute to future games developed by Grasshopper Manufacture. One of the major parts of the score was the main theme, which was used as a leitmotif throughout The Silver Case. He used the main theme, in addition to other dedicated character motifs, to create remixes and tunes that highlighted important parts of the game.

The game's two scenarios were handled by different writers: Suda wrote the "Transmitter" scenario, while the "Placebo" scenario was written by Masahi Ooka and Sako Kato. Suda's focus on the activities of a serial killer was in reaction to government censorship on general media following the Kobe child murders and its resultant controversy. To avoid trouble with the censors, Suda did not feature death scenes from the victims, in addition to focusing on the investigators rather than the murderer. According to Suda, before writing the scenario, the team created the setting and the social structure, with the main crime as the central event: rather than focusing on a particular character, the game instead looked at characters on either side of the crime, with the main theme being described as "human power VS. human power". This theme, in addition to delving into justice, evil and sin during the narrative, was intended by Suda to make the game original within its genre. The focus on crime would carry over into Suda's later scenario work. The character Tetsugoro Kusabi was based by Suda on his own ideal future vision of himself. Uehara came from his contemplation on what made someone a serial killer. In addition to the Kobe murders, Suda drew inspiration from the film Henry: Portrait of a Serial Killer. Another inspiration was Jean-Luc Godard's film Nouvelle Vague.

Suda and Ooka created the overall scenario together, with Suda in particular handling the events surrounding Kamui. Suda had not intended to write so much of the game, but he was forced into that position due to the limited staff: though having had previous experience with scenario writing at Human, it was difficult for him to create a wholly original premise and script for the game. Ooka was brought onto the team based on a companion piece he had written for a strategy guide for Moonlight Syndrome that acted as a subtext within the main narrative. Suda liked Ooka's work, and asked him to create a similar set-up for The Silver Case. Due to space limitations, "Placebo" became more text-focused than "Transmitter": according to Ooka, Suda would write his part, they would brainstorm about the story, then Ooka would use the text to create his part of the story. This was both a relief and a challenge, as having preexisting material took pressure off Ooka while also restricting his creative abilities. "Placebo" was not intended to be such a large part of the game, but its scope expanded as the game's development progressed. Speaking later, Suda noted that The Silver Case was very different from the studio's later titles, with no action gameplay and a lack of bloody violence. The Silver Case shares a setting and some characters with Moonlight Syndrome and Flower, Sun, and Rain.

== Release ==
The Silver Case was published by ASCII Entertainment on October 7, 1999. The PlayStation version would later be reissued through the PlayStation Network on December 10, 2008. While Suda wished for the game to be localized in English, translating and localizing the game properly initially prevented this: issues with translation ranged from the sheer amount of dialogue and some of its more nuanced and technical aspects, to questions in gameplay that required deep knowledge of how Japanese worked due to its implementation in puzzles and dialogue. Prior to its Western release, the title was alternately referred to as The Silver and its romaji reading Silver Jiken.

Suda had wanted to re-release the game in some form, but similar issues with its story and dialogue initially kept it exclusive to Japan. A remake for the Nintendo DS was announced in 2007, in addition to receive a Western release. Suda chose the platform as it was the most popular gaming console at the time. The gameplay was revamped to work with the DS' dual screen and touchscreen functions, but he also wanted the title to be more "complete" as it was Grasshopper Manufacture's first title. No extra storyline was created. During this period, Suda was also working on No More Heroes 2: Desperate Struggle, and so when asked about the game, said that its Western release needed time. Suda later said in 2009 that the DS port was "up in the air": while the game had been successfully ported to the DS, Suda and his team felt that they needed to completely remake the title to fit in with current gaming trends. Suda eventually confirmed in February 2012 that the DS port would not be released. Speaking in later interviews, Suda said that the DS port was cancelled because it did not feel right, as it would have needed drastic changes to suit its new environment.

=== The Silver Case HD Remaster ===
First teased in April 2016, The Silver Case HD Remaster is a high-definition remake of The Silver Case. Co-developed by Grasshopper Manufacture and Active Gaming Media, it was set for a worldwide digital release in Autumn for Windows through Steam and Playism, in addition to other unspecified platforms. Active Gaming Media approached Suda about localizing the game in 2014, several years after the DS port was cancelled. Having been keen to release The Silver Case overseas, Suda agreed to the collaboration, acting as producer for the project: Active Gaming Media handled the high-definition assets and localization, while Grasshopper Manufacture acted as general supervisor and supplied the original assets. The remaster was developed using the Unity 5 game engine, so porting to multiple platforms would be simplified.

While updating the original version's engine, its age made such an approach impractical. According to the programmer Yuki Yamazaki, while some algorithms such as those related to videos and scene changes were completely redone, others such as the film window system were kept as intact as possible to maintain the original atmosphere. The main problem with the port was that the original source code had been lost, so the audio data needed to be extracted from the PlayStation disc version using a converter. The localization was directed by Douglas Watt, while the main translator was James Mountain. Suda felt that Mountain took the majority of the load during the game's difficult translation and localization process.

Suda noted that local and overseas interest in the title had been piqued with the release of an artbook containing concept and character artwork from the company's titles, including The Silver Case. He was initially skeptical about whether the game could be properly translated into English, but in 2016 he said that he was satisfied by the results to that point. The game's question segments needed to be entirely rewritten due to their reliance on a knowledge of Japanese. According to the game's director Douglas Watt, the resolution needed to be upscaled from the PlayStation original's 480p to a modern 1080p. In addition, the UI and interface underwent modifications to be user-friendly for modern gamers. The 3D graphics and color balance were also altered and improved. Another difficult part was re-creating the game as a high-definition experience: some of the original data had been lost, so it needed to be reconstructed. The original music was remixed by Silent Hill composer Akira Yamaoka. Alongside all these updates and alterations, Suda wanted to keep the original atmosphere intact. In the end, Suda felt that they had produced the best possible remastered version. He decided against a full remake, which would have undergone changes, as he felt the game did not need it.

The remastered version of The Silver Case was released on October 7, 2016. In addition to its physical edition, a limited physical copy was produced and published by Limited Run Games; having previously handled releases for PlayStation titles, The Silver Case was their first PC title. In addition to a physical copy of the game, Limited Run Games included a full-color artbook, a manga written by Suda which acts as a prequel to the game, a game manual, and a soundtrack CD. The game was also released for the macOS platform on November 7. Nippon Ichi Software published the game in both physical and digital formats for the PlayStation 4 through its NIS America branch. According to Suda, he had intended to make the remaster available for new PlayStation consoles but did not know how to set about it. When approached by Nippon Ichi Software at the 2016 Tokyo Game Show, Suda broached the subject to them and they agreed to act as overseas publisher, giving Suda the impetus to develop the port. NIS America was chosen due to a strong Western fanbase built up by its lauded releases from the Danganronpa series. The port would not be released in Japan. This version included twelve remixed and two new tracks by Yamaoka, Erika Ito, and the Grasshopper Sound Team. It also included two new scenarios—"Yami", which takes place several months after the game's events and concludes the main narrative; and "Whiteout Prologue", which takes place after a time skip. Suda and Ooka returned to write the new scenarios: Ooka wrote "Yami", while both Suda and Ooka wrote "Whiteout Prologue". The game was released on April 17, 2017 in North America, and on April 21 in Europe. The PlayStation 4 version was released on March 15, 2018 in Japan, and was packaged with the remake of its sequel under the title The Silver Case 2425. The game was released for the Linux platform on August 1, 2017. A port of The Silver Case 2425 for the Nintendo Switch was released in Japan on February 18, 2021, and for North America and Europe in July.

== Reception ==
Reception

Aggregate score
Aggregator	Score
Metacritic	67/100 (PC); 64/100 (PS4)

Review scores
Publication	Score
Famitsu	30/40 (PS)
GameSpot	5/10 (PC)
PC Gamer (US)	50% (PC)
Hardcore Gamer	4/5 (PC)
RPGFan	88% (PC)

The remaster version received "mixed or average" reviews according to review aggregator website Metacritic.

Japanese gaming magazine Famitsu gave The Silver Case a score of 30 points out of 40: while one of the reviewers noted that the display windows were sometimes difficult to see, the magazine's critics were generally positive about the game's atmosphere, comparing it favorably to Suda's previous work on Moonlight Syndrome. Prior to its release in the West, The Silver Case was highlighted in multiple articles by 1UP.com as an early example of Suda's distinctive style.

== Legacy ==
The release of The Silver Case helped establish both Suda and Grasshopper Manufacture in the Japanese gaming industry. The themes explored in The Silver Case would recur in later Suda projects, including the internationally released Killer7. Suda would later say that, when making Killer7, he tried to revisit and refine the thematic, narrative and gameplay elements he envisioned and developed for The Silver Case.

An episodic sequel to The Silver Case was developed for mobile platforms by Grasshopper Manufacture. Titled The 25th Ward: The Silver Case, it was a text-based adventure game with action commands linked to number inputs. The episodes were released between October 2005 and March 2007, with later versions releasing between 2007 and 2011: the game was divided into three scenarios of five episodes each. A remake of Ward 25 for the DS was initially planned alongside its predecessor, being announced around the same time. It was eventually remade for PlayStation 4 and PC, releasing in 2018.
