= Flower, Sun, and Rain =

2001 video game

- North American DS box art
- Developers: Grasshopper Manufacture; h.a.n.d. (DS)
- Publishers: PlayStation 2; Victor Interactive Software; Nintendo DS; JP: Marvelous Entertainment; PAL: Rising Star Games; NA: Marvelous Entertainment USA
- Director: Goichi Suda
- Producer: Masato Mizushima
- Designer: Goichi Suda
- Artist: Takashi Miyamoto
- Writers: Goichi Suda; Masahi Ooka
- Composers: Masafumi Takada; Shingo Yasumoto
- Platforms: PlayStation 2 Nintendo DS
- Release: PlayStation 2: JP: May 2, 2001; Nintendo DS: JP: March 6, 2008; EU: November 14, 2008; AU: January 15, 2009; NA: June 16, 2009
- Genre: Adventure
- Mode: Single-player

Flower, Sun, and Rain (Note: Japanese: 花と太陽と雨と, Hepburn: Hana to Taiyō to Ame to; released on Nintendo DS as Flower, Sun, and Rain: Murder and Mystery in Paradise (花と太陽と雨と 終わらない楽園, Hana to Taiyō to Ame to: Owaranai Rakuen; lit. "Neverending Paradise")) is an adventure video game developed by Grasshopper Manufacture and published by Victor Interactive Software for the PlayStation 2 in 2001. It was initially only released in Japan. A port for the Nintendo DS (DS) was developed by h.a.n.d. under supervision by Grasshopper Manufacture. It was published by Marvelous Entertainment in Japan (2008) and North America (2009) and Rising Star Games in Europe (2008).

Flower, Sun, and Rain is set on the Micronesian island resort of Lospass, and is loosely connected to the events of The Silver Case. The story follows Sumio Mondo, a "searcher" who makes a living looking for things people have lost. Mondo is initially contracted to defuse a bomb planted on a plane, but is so distracted with helping the islanders that the bomb goes off. He ends up caught in a timeloop, where he relives the same day running up to the explosion. Gameplay focuses on Mondo exploring the island, solving numerical puzzles with the help of his computer "Catherine" to solve people's problems on Lospass.

Flower, Sun, and Rain was conceived, directed, designed and co-written by studio founder Goichi Suda. Production began in 1999 following the release of The Silver Case, the studio's debut title. Multiple staff from The Silver Case returned, including co-writer Masashi Ooka and character designer Takashi Miyamoto. Returning composer Masafumi Takada co-wrote the score with Shingo Yasumoto. The PS2 version remained exclusive to Japan, while the DS version received an international release. The original version was positively reviewed, but the DS release received mixed to negative reviews from critics.

== Gameplay ==
During the game, Mondo explores the environments of Lospass and the "Flower, Sun, and Rain" hotel (above, DS). The puzzle elements are based around solving numerical puzzles (below, PS2).

Flower, Sun, and Rain is an adventure game where players take the role of main protagonist Sumio Mondo. As Mondo, the player navigates the environments around the "Flower, Sun, and Rain" hotel on the island resort of Lospass. All environments within Lospass are rendered using three-dimensional graphics. The game is split into chapters that take place across eighteen days. While he has a main goal, "Obstacle" events will block his path, prompting him to help non-playable characters (NPCs) solving problems and locating lost items. Each day after the initial opening segment begins with Mondo in his hotel room, and after that time Mondo is allowed to explore the environments within and surrounding "Flower, Sun, and Rain". Later in the game, more of the environments open up for exploration. Mondo has no form of transport, only being able to explore the island on foot.

Puzzles in Flower, Sun, and Rain all follow a similar pattern, with Mondo being asked by NPCs to help them with a problem. Puzzles are solved using "Catherine", a suitcase-bound computer that Mondo carries with him at all times. Puzzles are initiated when locating environmental cues or talking to NPCs. All puzzles revolve around numerical solutions, the correct combinations being hinted at through dialogue and other clues: an example puzzle is taking a birthday and manipulating the numbers in some way, through either physically flipping them or rearranging them, to find the correct code. The player may also need to solve math or logic problems to deduce the correct code.

When all the necessary numbers are found, Mondo then uses Catherine to solve the puzzle and complete the request. Catherine can be connected to anything from inanimate objects to living people through the use of jacks: when the correct jack has been connected, the player then inputs the number sequence. If correct, the player gains a "Hit" and the puzzle is completed, but a "Blank" means that the player has the incorrect answer. If the player fails at a puzzle, they can start over again after a short cutscene. At the beginning of the game, Mondo is given a guidebook to the island, which acts as a means for the player to document environmental and dialogue clues.

In the Nintendo DS (DS) version, the gameplay is almost identical, although displays are split between the dual screen set up and touch screen controls are incorporated: puzzles make use of the touch screen and DS' stylus, while elements such as the map of Lospass are displayed on the bottom screen during navigation. A new feature dubbed the "Lost and Found Report" is added, giving players new puzzles to solve at the beginning of each day. Players also have access to a notepad within the Catherine computer, on which players can draw and write notes related to a particular puzzle. The amount of exploration done across Lospass by Mondo is documented using a Step Counter, and bonuses can be awarded based on the distance covered by Mondo. As the game progresses, additional costumes for Mondo are unlocked.

== Synopsis ==
The game opens with Sumio Mondo, a "searcher" who makes a living looking for people's lost things, arriving on the Micronesian resort island of Lospass and taking a room at the "Flower, Sun, and Rain" hotel; his task is to locate and defuse a bomb planted on a plane which is soon to leave the island's only airport. When he first arrives, he encounters Peter Bocchwinkur—a mediator between Mondo and his client Edo Macalister, manager of "Flower, Sun, and Rain". On his way to the airport, Mondo is distracted with helping other residents of Lospass and guests of "Flower, Sun, and Rain". This results in him failing in his mission, causing the bomb to explode and the plane to crash into Lospass. The next morning, Mondo wakes in his hotel room to find it is the same day as the explosion. Over the following two weeks, Mondo repeats the same day over and over again, but each time he is distracted with helping the islanders and fails to stop the bomb from exploding, which in turn causes his death. As each day passes, Mondo finds it increasingly difficult to maintain his sanity in the face of these inexplicable events.

On the fourteenth day, Mondo is attacked by the assassin Sundance Shot on the roof of "Flower, Sun, and Rain". Mondo is shot and falls to his death, and the next day federal agents Yoshimitsu Koshimizu and Remy Fawzil travel to Lospass to investigate the murder. During the investigation, a high school student named Toriko Kusabi confronts Shot to avenge the death of the island's "savior". Instead, the two strike a deal resulting in Mondo's resurrection. Alive once again, Mondo resumes his quest and encounters a man named Tokio Morishima, a protagonist from The Silver Case, who claims to have created the time loop. Tokio agrees to restore the flow of time and allow Mondo to reach the airport. In the final chapters, it is revealed by Tokio and Macalister that Lospass is an artificial island which was colonized as a breeding ground for an elusive species of hyena whose silver eye, when placed into the eye socket of a human being, would grant immortality. This discovery led to the birth of the Sundance Tribe, aborigines on Lospass—Tokio has one of the silver eyes, and its interaction with others on Lospass triggered the time loop.

Macalister declares that because of the silver eyes' existence, he planned to destroy the island with the bomb, however the bomb was stolen by Shot and taken aboard the plane to prevent its destruction. After Tokio ends the time loop, Mondo proceeds to the airport where he meets Toriko, Koshimizu, Fawzil and Shot at the flight gate. Shot reveals that both he and Mondo are genome clones of Sumio Kodai, a supporting character of The Silver Case—a new version of Mondo has been deposited on the island with each repeating day, with each Mondo clone inheriting the memories of his predecessor. Shot is also a member of the Sundance Tribe, and is implied to be the latest incarnation of Kamui Uehara, a serial killer from The Silver Case. Having accepted all his clones' memories and disarmed the bomb, Mondo is allowed to leave the island. The game ends with Mondo meeting Bocchwinkur on the plane—Bocchwinkur reveals himself to be the disguised Tetsuguro Kusabi, the former partner of Kodai during the events of The Silver Case.

== Development ==
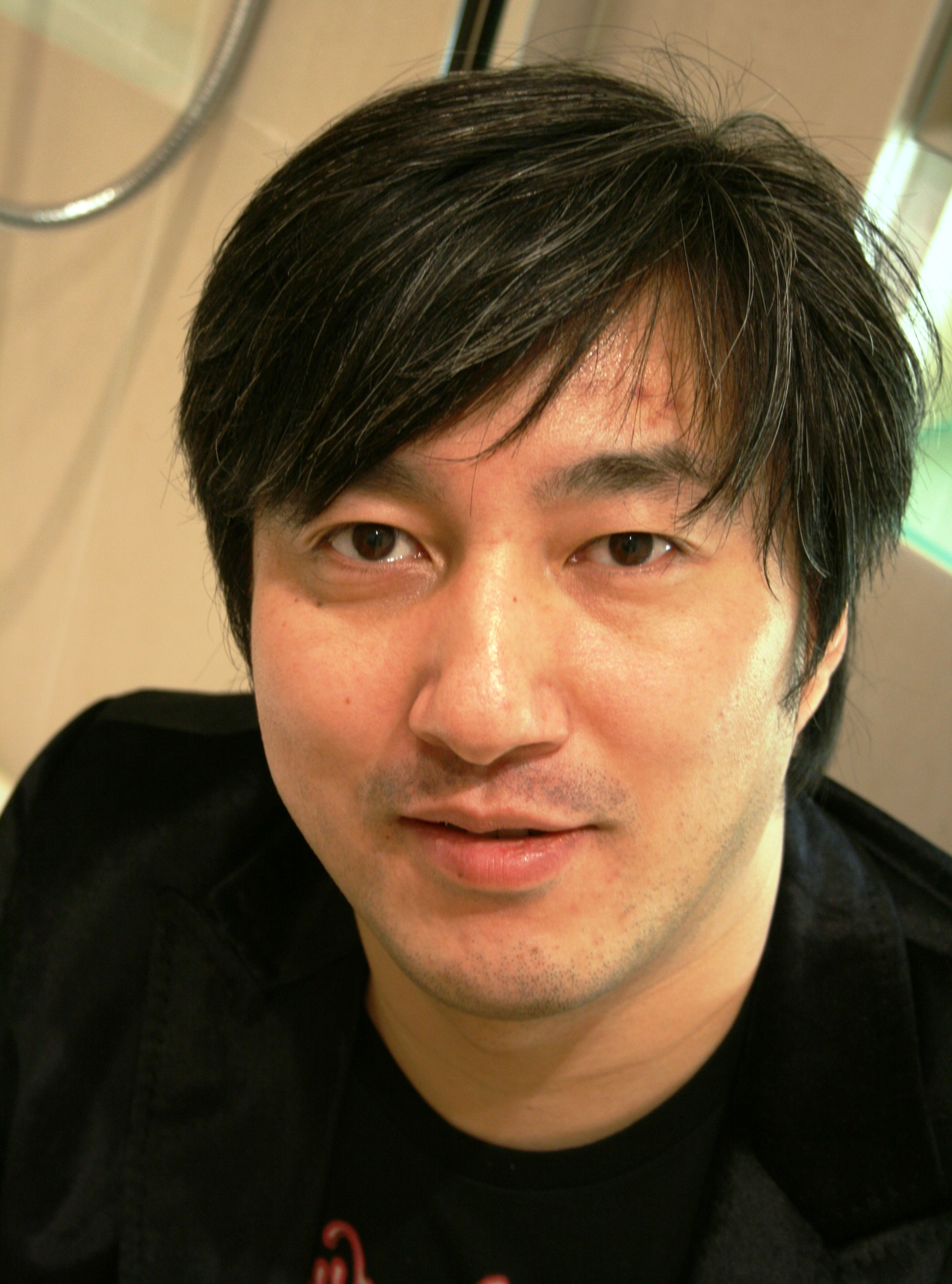
Goichi Suda, who would come to be known as Suda51; he directed, designed, and co-wrote Flower, Sun, and Rain.

Flower, Sun, and Rain was developed by Grasshopper Manufacture. The game was conceived by studio founder Goichi Suda, beginning development in 1999 after completion of the studio's debut title The Silver Case. The staff number for The Silver Case was under ten people and thus they had to adjust their development goals based on that. For Flower, Sun, and Rain five or six more people were involved and thus the scope was increased, such as including exploration and action elements. According to Suda, Flower, Sun, and Rain was part of the studio's transition towards more action-oriented titles. While The Silver Case was published on the original PlayStation, that console was nearing the end of its viable life cycle, so Flower, Sun, and Rain was developed for the PlayStation 2 (PS2). Flower, Sun, and Rain moved away from the purely text-driven structure of The Silver Case, but it still carried over many of the previous game's themes and concepts. As with The Silver Case, Suda wanted to include puzzles, but felt that he had gone too far with the variety and challenge of puzzles within The Silver Case. Instead, Suda created a single puzzle system revolving around numerical combinations, which both simplified puzzles and tied in with Mondo's character.

Suda wrote the game's script in an improvisational manner, aiming for a lighthearted atmosphere that sometimes even mocked the game's design. The main reason for this was that he had fully immersed himself in the grim atmosphere of The Silver Case, and he wanted a change both for himself and his next game. Returning staff from The Silver Case included scenario co-writer Masashi Ooka and character designer Takashi Miyamoto; the change to a lighter atmosphere proved difficult for Miyamoto when designing the characters. Despite the differing aesthetics, the overall visual design was deliberately similar to that of The Silver Case. The narrative's setting drew from the Japanese film The Miracle of Joe Petrel, while the time loop concept was inspired by The X-Files episode "Monday".

Flower, Sun, and Rain shares its setting and some characters with some of Suda's other games, such as Moonlight Syndrome and The Silver Case. Despite acting as a sequel to The Silver Case, and featuring a version of that game's protagonist Sumio Kodai, the story does not present itself as initially related to The Silver Case. This approach was inspired by the Star System utilized by manga artist Osamu Tezuka in which the same characters appear in different works with different roles. The opening scene, where Mondo drives his car towards the island, was put into the game to both introduce Mondo's character to newcomers, and to throw players of The Silver Case off guard by the familiar name "Sumio" contrasting with Mondo's the unfamiliar personality. It also helped establish the setting and get the player used to Mondo's point of view. His portable computer Catherine, stored in a suitcase, is said by Suda to contain the events of The Silver Case within it. Despite this, it literally being a "silver case" was coincidental rather than a deliberate reference to the previous game's title.

=== Sound design ===
The music was composed by Masafumi Takada, who had previously worked on The Silver Case; and Shingo Yasumoto, who had worked on the Twilight Syndrome series. The soundtrack incorporated remixed and re-orchestrated versions of classical music. The idea of using classical music was suggested by Suda: he told the sound designers to create a score that sounded like lounge music, but some considered tracks could not be used due to licensing issues. Due to budgetary constraints, voice acting could not be included, with characters instead being given garbled vocals "that sounded like random foreign languages".

== Release ==
Flower, Sun, and Rain was originally going to be published by ASCII Entertainment, the publishers for The Silver Case. Policy changes at ASCII meant that the whole project was in danger of being cancelled as they would no longer support the game. Suda ended up pitching to other publishing houses, eventually gaining the support of Victor Interactive Software. This approach of pitching to new publishers with each title would be adopted by the developer for multiple subsequent titles to protect their status as an independent studio. It was during this period that he met Yasuhiro Wada, with whom he collaborated on future projects for Grasshopper Manufacture. The change of publisher, along with its release date, was publicly revealed in February 2001. Over the following months, the game was featured in multiple Japanese magazines, and was exhibited at that year's first Tokyo Game Show. The game's opening used a mixture of live-action and in-game footage; the live action footage featured actress and model Mia Murano. In addition to its Japanese title, the game's title was translated into English, giving rise to its common acronym "FSR". Flower, Sun, and Rain was released on May 2, 2001. The PS2 version was not released outside Japan. It was speculated that this was due to the game's content mirroring recent terrorist attacks.

=== Nintendo DS port ===
The DS version of Flower, Sun, and Rain was first announced in November 2007 with an intended 2008 release window. Production was primarily handled by Japanese company h.a.n.d. under Grasshopper Manufacture's supervision. The port was suggested to Suda by Wada, who had also proposed developing No More Heroes for the Wii. Due to both this and Wada's prestigious career as a game developer, Suda felt obliged to accept the offer. The port was developed without Suda's direct involvement. Despite this, Marvelous producer Yoshifumi Hashimoto worked to keep the port as faithful to the original version as possible. Suda's one major request for the port was to incorporate the DS' touch screen functionality into gameplay. Takada returned to create new musical tracks for the game. It was noted that the visuals were noticeably downgraded during the transition onto DS hardware. In Japan, the game was subtitled Neverending Paradise (終わらない楽園, Owaranai Rakuen). The subtitle was created by Grasshopper in consultation with the game's publisher based on the time loop in which Mondo was trapped. The game published in Japan by Marvelous Entertainment on March 6, 2008.

Flower, Sun, and Rain was released in Europe on November 14, 2008. It was published in the region by Rising Star Games. The game was also released in Australia on January 15, 2009. In North America, the title was published by Marvelous Entertainment USA in partnership with Xseed Games. The North American version used a different localization to the European version with further polishing performed by Xseed Games, which contributed the delay in releasing the game. Another reason for the delay was the game's unique nature, which made it a hard sell for the company, in addition to the flagging popularity of the DS at the time. Xseed Games spent an unspecified time deliberating over whether to release it in North America at all before approving the decision. Initially scheduled for March 2009, the game was eventually released in North America on June 16. In English territories, the subtitle was changed to Murder and Mystery in Paradise, while the game's original title remained intact.

== Reception ==
Reception

Aggregate score
Aggregator	Score
Metacritic	54/100 (37 reviews)

Review scores
Publication	Score
1Up.com	C
Destructoid	3/10
Eurogamer	5/10
Famitsu	8/10, 8/10, 9/10, 9/10 (PS2); 29/40 (DS)
Game Informer	5.5/10
GameSpot	6/10
IGN	5.5/10
Nintendo World Report	4/10
PALGN	4.5/10

In its review of the original version, Japanese magazine Famitsu praised the game's tone and story, with one reviewer noting its focus on visual aesthetics, although another noted the "mismatch" between the game's light tone and darker themes. Speaking about the PS2 original in a feature about Goichi Suda, Ray Barnholt of 1UP.com positively noted the use of music for setting the mood and capturing that atmosphere, and referred to the title as a notable step towards the studio's more successful future titles. Speaking about the graphics, he negatively compared to those of the Nintendo 64, saying they undermined the experience. For the DS port, Famitsu held many of the same opinions, comparing it positively to Suda's other works and noting its combination of charm and weirdness, although one reviewer was disappointed that it was the same game as the original.

Reviewing the DS version for 1UP.com, Barnholt positively noted the surreal story and music, but felt that the gameplay began to falter during the second half and called the graphics "perhaps even worse" than the PS2 original. He concluded that the game was most suited to dedicated fans of Suda's work, and that it showed the increased quality of his work on later titles more than having its own qualities. Matthew Razak of Destructoid found the gameplay elements "seriously lacking" and faulted most aspects of the title, which contributed to the low score. Despite this, Razak felt that people should play it and experience its unique deconstruction of game cliches, a theme that he realized ran through all of Suda's subsequent work. Eurogamer's Oli Welsh found that most of the puzzles presented to the player were forced in and distracted from the main narrative, but noted that the odd elements within the game fitted well into the story's surreal style. He was fairly negative about the graphics, despite the stylized look helping alleviate the downgrade from the PS2 original. In conclusion, he called the game's dated appearance and style "a double edged sword", both entertaining and annoying players with its mechanics and styling. Game Informer's Joe Juba enjoyed the bizarre characters and story, in addition to the artistic styling and music. His main complaints were focused on tedious sections within the gameplay and the "blocky" graphics. He said that, unless the player believed in sacrificing everything for style, Flower, Sun, and Rain could not be recommended.

Mark Bozon of IGN was highly critical of the game's dated graphics, found the overall gameplay very slow, and found the garbled voice work unsettling while enjoying the soundtrack. He concluded that, even as a fan of old school and abstract gameplay design, he had not enjoyed his time with the game. Lark Anderson, writing for GameSpot said there was "never a dull moment" due to the eccentric cast and story, and found the puzzle elements to be an entertaining challenge. His main complaints were the poor graphics, unresponsive camera system, lack of direction during navigation and the constant need for backtracking. Nintendo World Report's Nick DiMola noted the dialogue for its humor, but generally faulted most other aspects of the game; he called its graphics and sound low-quality, felt the gameplay was shallow, and found the puzzle solving segments a chore. He found it hard to recommend the title for any but dedicated fans of Suda's work. PALGN reviewer Ben Chev called the script "well-written in what can only be described as a typical Suda 51 style", and praised the music for its unique take on classical music. However he generally faulted the gameplay and called the graphics the worst he had seen for the DS.
