= Aichi Prefectural University of the Arts =

Higher education institution in Nagakute, Japan

Coordinates: 35°10′10″N 137°04′10.65″E

- 愛知県立芸術大学
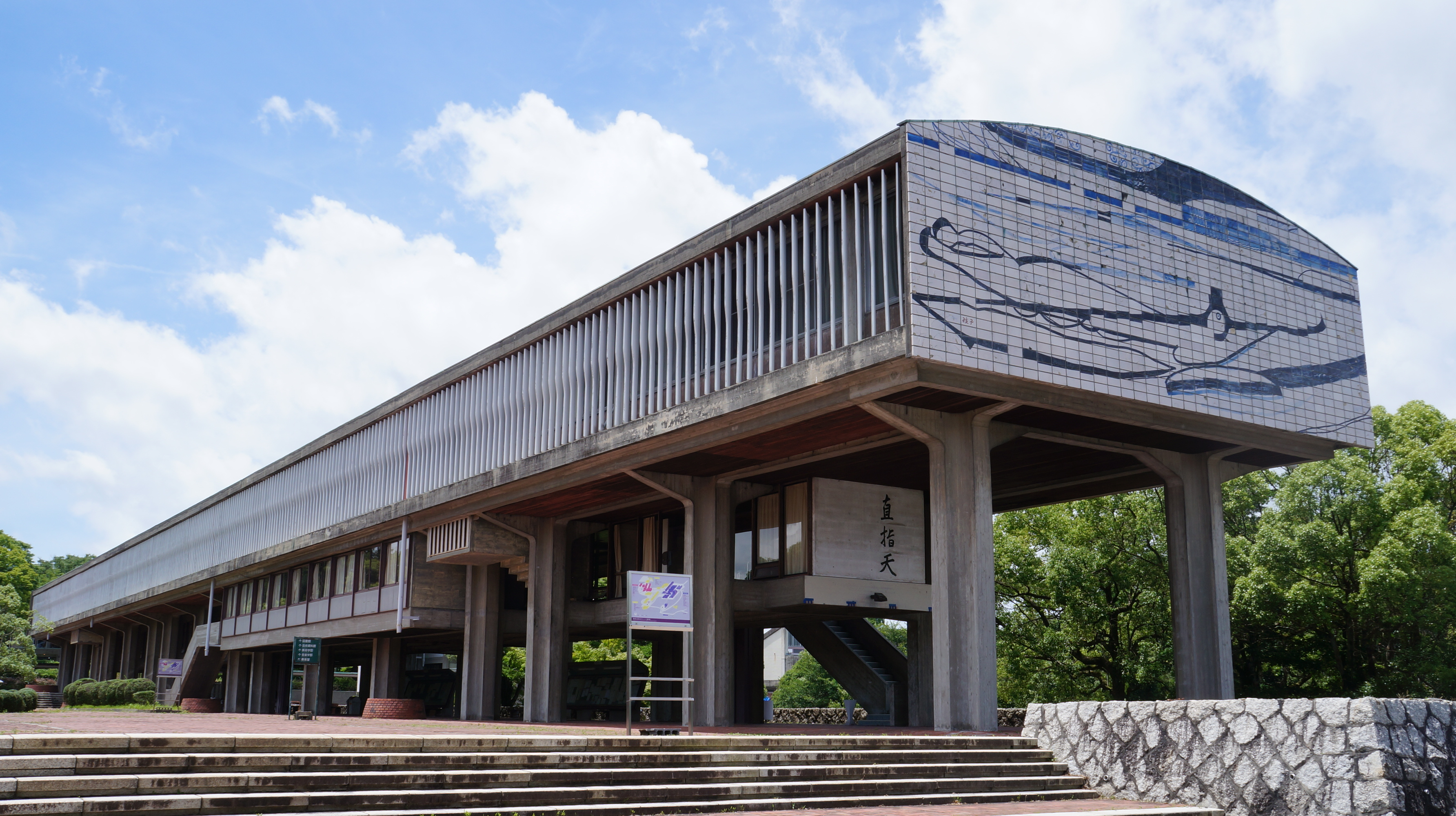
- Type: Public
- Established: 1966
- Director: Teruo Isomi
- Undergraduates: 826
- Postgraduates: 185
- Doctoral students: 28
- Location: Nagakute, Aichi, Japan
- Campus: Nagakute
- Website: www.aichi-fam-u.ac.jp

Aichi Prefectural University of the Arts (愛知県立芸術大学, Aichi kenritsu geijutsu daigaku) formerly known as "Aichi Prefectural University of Fine Arts and Music" is a public university in the city of Nagakute in Aichi Prefecture, Japan. The university was established in 1966 and is located in a hilly area on the eastern outskirts of Nagoya. The campus covers an area of approximately 410,000 square meters, with university facilities blending in with the surrounding nature and greenery.

== History ==
- 1966 – Aichi Prefectural University of Fine Arts and Music is established
  The Painting, Sculpture, and Design Divisions are established in the Department of Fine Arts, Faculty of Art
  The Composition, Voice, and Instrumental Music (Piano, Strings) Divisions are established in the Department of Music, Faculty of Music
  Naoteru Ueno assumes office as the first President
- 1970 – Graduate School (Master Course) opens
  The Painting, Sculpture, and Design Divisions are established in the Graduate School of Fine Arts
  The Composition, Voice, and Instrumental Music (Piano, Strings) Divisions are established in the Graduate School of Music
- 1972 – Shinichiro Kozuka assumes office as the second President
- 1977 – Masaaki Oshita becomes acting president upon the death of Shinichiro Kozuka
  Masuto Toyooka assumes office as the third President
- 1983 – Takashi Kono assumes office as the fourth President
- 1985 – Student exchange agreement between Aichi Prefectural University of Fine Arts and Music and Nanjing Academy of Fine Arts is signed
- 1989 – The Faculty of Art is expanded to include the Department of Design and Craft; the Design Division is transferred from the Department of Fine Arts to the Department of Design and Craft; the Ceramics Division is established in the Department of Design and Craft
  The Painting Division in the Department of Fine Arts, Faculty of Art is reorganized into the Japanese Painting and Oil Painting Divisions
  The Winds and Percussion Course is introduced in the Instrumental Music Division of the Department of Music, Faculty of Music
  Museum of Horyuji Mural Reproductions opens
  Yoshikado Tatehata assumes office as the fifth President
- 1993 – The Painting Division is subdivided into the Japanese Painting and Oil Painting Divisions, and the Ceramics Division is introduced, in the Graduate School of Fine Arts
- 1994 – The Composition (Musicology) Course is established in the Composition Division of the Department of Music, Faculty of Music
  The Composition (Musicology) Course is established in the Composition Division, along with the establishment of the Instrumental Music (Winds and Percussion) Courses in the Instrumental Music Division, Graduate School of Music
- 1995 – Makoto Kawakami assumes office as the sixth President
- 2001 – The Art History, Art Theory and Conservation Division is established in the Department of Fine Arts, Faculty of Art
  Shozo Shimada assumes office as the seventh President
- 2007 – Aichi Prefectural University of Fine Arts and Music becomes independent, now run by the Aichi Public University Corporation
  The Master Course is reorganized; as a result, the five Divisions of the Graduate School of Fine Arts are combined into a single division, while the three divisions of the Graduate School of Music are combined into a single division
  Teruo Isomi assumes office as the eighth President
- 2009 – Graduate School (Doctor Course) opens
  Doctor Courses are now established in the Fine Arts Division, the Graduate School of Fine Arts, and the Music Division of the Graduate School of Music, respectively.

== Departments ==
=== Department of Fine Arts ===
(Includes undergraduate and graduate school programs)

- Japanese Painting
- Oil Painting
- Sculpture
- Art History, Art Theory and Conservation Division
- Craft&Design
  - Design
  - Ceramics

=== Department of Music ===
(Includes undergraduate and graduate school programs)

- Composition
  - Composition
  - Musicology
- Vocal Music
- Instrumental Music
  - Piano
  - String Instruments
  - The Winds and Percussion

== Organisation & Facilities ==
- University Art Museum
- University Library
- Sogakudo Concert Hall
- Museum of Horyuji Mural Reproductions Virtual tour of the Museum of Horyuji Mural Reproductions
- Center for Promoting Fine Arts and Music
- Art Information Center
- Art Education/Student Support Center
- Administration Office
- Student Dormitory

=== Artists ===
- Yoshitomo Nara (Artist)
- Atsuko Ishizuka (Film director, animator)
- Yukinobu Hoshino (Manga artist)

=== Musicians ===
- Hiro Fujikake (Composer/Conductor/Producer/Synthesizer player)
- Yuko Kawai (Pianist)
- Shigenobu Nakamura (Composer)
- Michiru Yamane (Composer)

== Faculty members ==
- Fram Kitagawa (Art director)
- Tsuneyuki Morita (Conservation Science)
- Yuzo Toyama (Conducting)
- Hiroyuki Yamamoto (Composition)

== International Exchanges ==
- Nanjing Arts Institute (China)
- Edinburgh College of Art (United Kingdom)
