= Rocket Knight =

2010 video game

- Xbox Live Arcade cover art
- Developer: Climax Studios
- Publisher: Konami
- Producer: Tomm Hulett
- Designer: Phil Mansell
- Programmer: Ben Potton
- Artist: Richard Turner
- Series: Rocket Knight
- Platforms: Windows, Xbox 360, PlayStation 3
- Release: Windows, Xbox 360: WW: May 12, 2010; PlayStation 3: JP/PAL: May 12, 2010; NA: May 18, 2010
- Genres: Platform, scrolling shooter
- Mode: Single-player

Rocket Knight is a 2010 platform video game developed by Climax Studios and published by Konami for the Xbox 360 (via Xbox Live Arcade), PlayStation 3 (via PlayStation Network), and Microsoft Windows. It is a revival of the Rocket Knight/Sparkster series, which first began with Rocket Knight Adventures (1993). The game acts as a sequel to the Sega Genesis game Sparkster: Rocket Knight Adventures 2 (1994).

== Gameplay ==
Like its precursors, Rocket Knight is a side-scrolling platform game where the player guides Sparkster through linear levels to defeat the end level boss or reach the goal. Sparkster can jump and attack using his sword and rocket pack. Similar to Sparkster: Rocket Knight Adventures 2, Sparkster uses a melee attack with his sword and auto-generates power with his rocket pack. Unlike previous games, Sparkster can no longer perform consecutive boosts, but can now briefly hover in the air and shoot range projectiles, in addition to being able to defend himself from projectiles using attacks. There are other tweaks, such as Sparkster only bouncing off walls when he hits them at a 45 degree angle.

The game consists of fourteen levels, divided across four worlds. Like previous games, there are side-scrolling shooting segments. In the shooting segments, Sparkster can now charge his shots and use his rocket pack to avoid obstacles. Several items and power-ups can be found spread across the levels.

Upon completion of a level, the game is saved, allowing to continue at a later time. The respective level is also unlocked in the Free Play mode, where the player can replay the levels. If the player loses all their lives, they can use a limited number of continues to resume play at the last stage where all lives were lost, otherwise the game will end and save progress will be erased, though Free Play stages will remain unlocked.

If the game is completed, the player will unlock a skin of Axel Gear for use in the game. If certain criteria is met while finishing the game on the Hard difficulty, the Gold Sparkster skin is unlocked; which halves the maximum health, increasing the difficulty.

== Plot ==
Following Sparkster's triumph over the Gedol Empire, the Rocket Knight returns to the Kingdom of Zephyrus. In his surprise, he finds out that the pigs of the Devontidos Empire that he previously fought have taken up residence in the kingdom alongside the opossum inhabitants during his recent quest, under permission granted by the king of Zephyrus. General Sweinhart, a war veteran from the previous war between the kingdoms and current leader of the Devontidos Empire had made a truce with the king of Zephyrus. Despite Sparkster's warning claims, the king ignores his pleads and allows the pigs to stay in the kingdom; with the kingdom in peace and the Rocket Knight no longer needed by the king, Sparkster leaves the kingdom and retires.

Fifteen years later, Sparkster lives a casual farming life with his wife and son. While farming one day, he witnesses Zephyrus become subject to the invasion of an army of mountain wolves. Sparkster equips his Rocket Knight gear and departs from his home to save Zephyrus. Upon arriving at the kingdom, Sparkster encounters his arch-nemesis Axel Gear, who had been acting as Rocket Knight in his absence. After destroying a forest shredder, Sparkster is captured under the robot's metallic face, where Axel Gear takes credit for his victory against the enemy. General Sweinhart announces his declaration of war against the wolves to the pigs and opossums, receiving praise from the townspeople. Suspecting something may be amiss, Sparkster decides to head towards the Wolf Kingdom, where he faces and defeats the wolves' leader, Ulfgar. Shortly after Ulfgar's defeat, Sweinhart and Axel arrive and knock out the king and Sparkster, throwing the latter to a deep pit. Sweinhart breaks the truce and turns the pigs against the opossums once again. Sparkster awakens in the cave and makes his escape, defeating Axel once more. Sparkster makes his way back to Zephyrus. where Sweinhart confronts and attacks Sparkster using his giant pig robot, the latter emerging victorious at the end.

Sparkster is praised by the townspeople and reunites with Princess Sherry in celebration over his triumph against the Devontidos Empire. With his job done, Sparkster flies back home to his family.

== Development and release ==
When producer Tomm Hulett joined Konami, he decided to work on a pitch for a revival for Sparkster, which was accepted after two years and four pitches. Hulett claims that "it was really a matter of reworking the concept – making the right pitch at the right time", with various recent franchise revivals receiving positive responses at the time. Hulett also said that Konami thought Climax Studios were the best pick partly due to their facial animation technology, allowing Sparkster to produce expressions respective to his 16-bit counterparts.

Rocket Knight is one of the games featured in Xbox's November 2021 Games with Gold lineup, where the game was made for free for the month for Xbox Live Gold and Game Pass Ultimate subscribers.

== Reception ==
Reception

Aggregate score
Aggregator	Score
Metacritic	72/100 (X360); 70/100 (PS3); 63/100 (PC)

IGN gave the game a score of 7.5, praising the inventive platforming but showing concern for the high price point. Game Informer gave the game a score of eight out of ten. GamesRadar gave the game 7/10, praising its mechanics but criticising its fluctuating difficulty, along with the high price point. 1Up gave it a C+ grade, criticising its lack of variety. Sales were near to 12,000 units as of year-end 2010.

== See also ==
- Rocket Knight Adventures
- Sparkster: Rocket Knight Adventures 2
- Sparkster
