= Liam O'Brien =

American voice actor (born 1976)

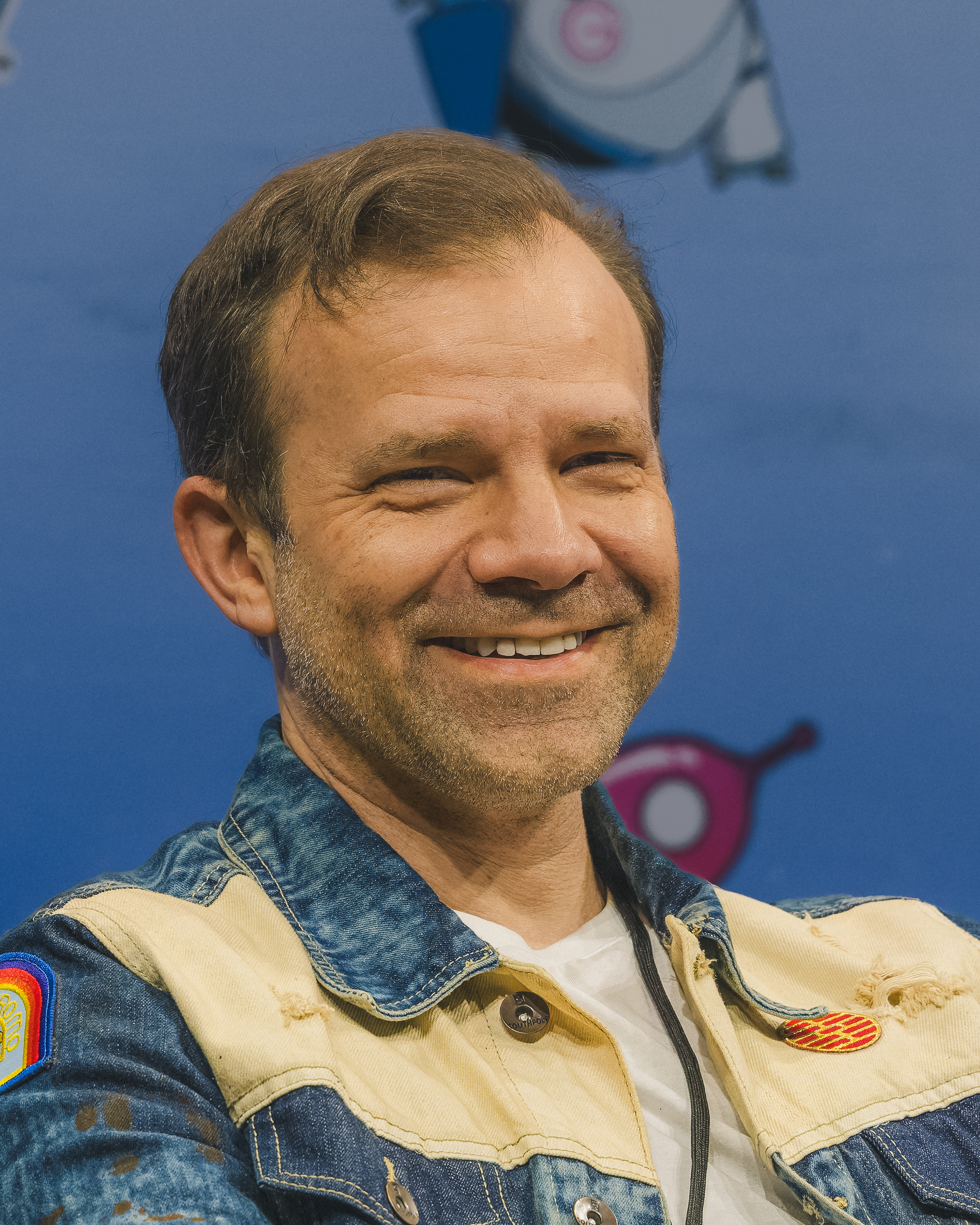
- O'Brien in 2026
- Born: May 28, 1976 (age 50); Weehawken, New Jersey, U.S.
- Occupations: Voice actor, writer, director
- Years active: 2001–present
- Spouse: Amy Kincaid (m. 2002)
- Children: 2

Liam Christopher O'Brien (born May 28, 1976) is an American voice actor, writer, and director. He is a regular cast member of the Dungeons & Dragons actual play series Critical Role, playing Vax'ildan ("Vax"), Caleb Widogast, Orym, and Halandil Fang. He has been involved in many video games, cartoons, and English-language adaptations of Japanese anime. His major anime roles include Gaara in Naruto, Naruto: Shippuden, and Boruto, Vincent Law in Ergo Proxy, Captain Jushiro Ukitake in Bleach, Lloyd in Code Geass, Kenzo Tenma in Monster, Akihiko Sanada in Persona 3, and Nephrite in the Viz Media dub of Sailor Moon.

In cartoons, O'Brien has voiced characters in shows such as Star Wars Rebels, Transformers: Robots in Disguise, Avengers Assemble, Wolverine and the X-Men, and Hulk and the Agents of S.M.A.S.H.. In video games, he voiced Gollum in Middle-earth: Shadow of Mordor and its sequel, Caius Ballad in Final Fantasy XIII-2 and Lightning Returns: Final Fantasy XIII, War in Darksiders, Allen Lee in Fallout 4, Asura in Asura's Wrath, Ieyasu Tokugawa in Sengoku Basara: Samurai Heroes, Illidan Stormrage in World of Warcraft and Heroes of the Storm, Yasuo in League of Legends, Grimoire Weiss in Nier, the Warden in For Honor, Dimitri Allen and Clark Triton in the Professor Layton series and Barker in Titanfall 2.

He is an automated dialog replacement writer for anime and has provided voice direction for over 300 episodes of anime such as Naruto. He has also voice directed for video games such as The Last of Us, Evolve, Resident Evil 5, and Resident Evil 6.

== Early life ==
Liam Christopher O'Brien was born in Weehawken, New Jersey, on May 28, 1976. He is of Irish ancestry. His mother, Lois Wiltse O'Brien, worked as an educator as well as a quality assurance trainer and consultant. He has a sister named Cara. His family were Reformed Christians, and he was "raised by a Christian mother and attended 15 years of Christian schooling", but would later describe himself as agnostic. He began acting in high school at St. Peter's Preparatory School, resolving to "just be a starving artist" as he knew the chances of success in the field were low. O'Brien moved to New York City to attend the New York University Tisch School of the Arts.

== Career ==
In his early career, O'Brien worked in theater on various productions around the country. He met Crispin Freeman while working on a production of Shakespeare's R&J in Cincinnati, Ohio, which helped him get voice-over work back in New York. He and his partner decided to leave the city in the aftermath of the September 11 attacks and pursued a voice acting career. While he enjoyed theater, he gave up on it as the voice work would better allow him to support and spend time with his family.

O'Brien affirms that he often plays characters that are insane or evil geniuses, although he has also voiced comedic characters such as Fukuyama in Girls Bravo. He describes Cumore from Tales of Vesperia as "extremely unhinged". In Darksiders, he voices the lead character War, one of the Four Horsemen of the Apocalypse. He describes his voicing as deeper than his usual voice, and that he portrayed War as a fairly old soul who isn't surprised at the events around him. In the video game-based film Final Fantasy VII: Advent Children, he voiced Red XIII. In addition to voice acting, he has worked as a voice director and writer on various video games and anime shows.

=== Critical Role ===
He is also a cast member of the popular web series Critical Role, in which he and other voice actors play Dungeons & Dragons. Critical Role was both the Webby Winner and the People's Voice Winner in the "Games (Video Series & Channels)" category at the 2019 Webby Awards; the show was also both a Finalist and the Audience Honor Winner at the 2019 Shorty Awards. After becoming hugely successful, the Critical Role cast left the Geek & Sundry network in early 2019 and set up their own production company, Critical Role Productions. Soon after, they aimed to raise $750,000 on Kickstarter to create an animated series of their first campaign, but ended up raising over $11 million. In November 2019, Amazon Prime Video announced that they had acquired the streaming rights to this animated series, now titled The Legend of Vox Machina, and O'Brien reprised his role as Vax'ildan. In June 2021, O'Brien was added to the cast of Exandria Unlimited, a spinoff of Critical Role. O'Brien is also one of the narrators for the audiobook edition of the novel Critical Role: Vox Machina – Kith & Kin (2021). O'Brien was the author of Critical Role: Der Katzenprinz & Other Zemnian Tales, with illustration by Charlie Borovsky; the in-universe fairy-tale collection was released on April 8, 2025.

== Personal life ==
O'Brien married voice actress Amy Kincaid in 2002. The couple have two children: a daughter and a son. They live in Los Angeles.

He suffers from hyperacusis, a hearing disorder that makes him unusually sensitive to everyday noises.

== Filmography ==
=== Anime ===
List of voice performances in anime
Year	Title	Role	Notes	Source
2001	Boogiepop Phantom	Yoji Suganuma, others		CA
2001	Gokudo	Tei		CA
2002	His and Her Circumstances	Hideki Asaba, Fukada Kohei		CA
2002	Revolutionary Girl Utena	Mamiya Chida		CA
2003	Figure 17	Toru		CA
2003	Wolf's Rain	Soldier		
2003	DNA²	Junta Momonari		CA
2003	K.O. Beast	Bud Mint		CA
2004	Yukikaze	Various characters		CA
2004	Texhnolyze	Haruhiko Toyama		CA
2004	.hack//Legend of the Twilight	Tom		CA
2004	Gad Guard	Truck Driver		CA
2004	R.O.D.	Various characters	Also as William Markham	CA
2004	Ghost in the Shell: Stand Alone Complex	Various characters		CA
2004	Paranoia Agent	Mitsuhiro Maniwa, Man on Phone 2		CA
2004	Comic Party	Taishi Kuhonbutsu		CA
2004	Gungrave	Executive A, Researcher, Sam		CA
2004	Marmalade Boy	Akira Mizutani, Alex		CA
2005	Girls Bravo	Kazuharu Fukuyama		
2005	Rumiko Takahashi Anthology	Ryuichi, Mover, Odagiri, Zashiki Warashi, Gorgeous		CA
2005	Mermaid Forest	Yuta		CA
2005	Samurai Champloo	Young Yamane, Eel Shop Owner, others		CA
2005	Daphne in the Brilliant Blue	Various characters		CA
2005	Koi Kaze	Kei Odagiri, Man, Friend A		CA
2005	Duel Masters: Season 2	Shobu Kirifuda		CA
2005	Tenjho Tenge	Shin Natsume		CA
2005	The Melody of Oblivion	Horu, Person of the Cape		CA
2005	Mermaid Forest	Yuta, others		CA
2005	DearS	Various characters		CA
2005	Ghost Talker's Daydream	Various characters		CA
2005	Ghost in the Shell: Stand Alone Complex 2nd GIG	Gino, others		CA
2005	Gankutsuou: The Count of Monte Cristo	Andrea Cavalcanti		CA
2005	Saiyuki Reload	Various characters		CA
2005	Scrapped Princess	Furet		CA
2005	Leave it to Piyoko!	Thin Blob	OVA	CA
2006	Boys Be...	Makoto Kurumizawa	Voice director and script writer	
2006	Kannazuki no Miko	Tsubasa		CA
2006	Saiyuki Reload Gunlock	Rin's Captor, Subordinate		CA
2006	Gun Sword	Ray Lundgren, Wild Bunch C		CA
2006	Kamichu!	Shika, Inu Osho, Konoha Kamaitachi, others		CA
2006	The Prince of Tennis	Nanjiro Echizen, Arai		CA
2006	Fate/stay night	Archer		CA
2006	Ergo Proxy	Vincent Law		CA
2006	Paradise Kiss	Seiji Kisaragi		CA
2006–07	Haré+Guu	Dr. Clive		
2006–09	Naruto	Gaara, Kotetsu Hagane		CA
2007	Blue Dragon	Dolsk		CA
2007	To Heart	Various characters		CA
2007	Cutie Honey	Seiji's Contact	Live-action dub	CA
2007	The Melancholy of Haruhi Suzumiya	Baseball Team Captain		CA
2007	The Third: The Girl With the Blue Eye	Various characters		CA
2007	Phoenix	Ohtomo		CA
2007–14	Bleach	Jushiro Ukitake, Sora Inoue		CA
2008	Code Geass series	Lloyd Asplund		CA
2008	Buso Renkin	Gota Nakamura, Hideki Okakura		CA
2008	Descendants of Darkness	Hisoka Kurosaki		CA
2009–10	Monster	Kenzo Tenma		CA
2009–19	Naruto: Shippuden	Gaara		CA
2010	Slayers series	Rezo	Revolution and Evolution-R	
2012–22	Tiger & Bunny	Lunatic / Yuri Petrov		
2013	Fate/Zero	Kariya Matou		
2013	Nura: Rise of the Yokai Clan	Hidemoto Keikain & Shōei		
2013–14	Magi: The Labyrinth of Magic	Jamil, Markkio and Issac		
2013–15	Digimon Fusion	Deckergreymon, Neptunmon, Mercurymon, others		
2014–15	Sailor Moon	Nephrite	Viz dub	
2015	Mobile Suit Gundam: The Origin	Gihren Zabi		
2015	Sailor Moon Crystal	Nephrite		
2016	Sengoku Basara: End of Judgement	Ieyasu Tokugawa		
2018–19	Baki	Atsushi Suedou, Valentin Sokolov	Netflix ONA	
2019	Ultraman	Dan Moroboshi	Netflix ONA	
2019–23	Boruto: Naruto Next Generations	Gaara		
2020	Marvel Future Avengers	Red Skull, Doctor Strange		
2023	Baki Hanma	Atsushi Suedou		

=== Animation ===
Key
†	Denotes television productions that have not yet been released

List of voice performances in animation
Year	Title	Role	Crew role, notes	Source
2008–09	Wolverine and the X-Men	Warren Worthington III / Angel / Archangel, Nightcrawler, Nitro		
2010	G.I. Joe: Renegades	Captain Anatoly Krimov / Red Star, others	Episode: "Union of the Snake"	
2012–14	NFL Rush Zone	RZ6.0/Richard Zimmer, Zich, others		
2012–18	Sofia the First	Additional voices	2 episodes	
2013	Phineas and Ferb: Mission Marvel	Red Skull		
2013–17	Avengers Assemble	Red Skull / Iron Skull, Stephen Strange / Doctor Strange, Blood Brother #2, additional voices		
2014	Regular Show	Tango	Episode: "Gold Watch"	
2014–15	Hulk and the Agents of S.M.A.S.H.	Arkon, Red Skull, others		
2014–17	Star Wars Rebels	Supply Master Yogar Lyste, Morad Sumar, others		
2015	Transformers: Robots in Disguise	Underbite, Kickback, others		
2016	Ultimate Spider-Man	Doctor Strange	Episode: "Miles from Home"	
2016	Pickle and Peanut	Head Mannequin	Episode: "Bats/Movie Camp Out"	
2019	Amphibia	Additional voices	3 episodes	
2019	Carmen Sandiego	Professor Gunnar Maelstrom, Vlad, Boris, ACME Agent.		
2019	DC Super Hero Girls	General Zod	3 episodes	
2020	Spider-Man	Doctor Strange	2 episodes	
2021	Dota: Dragon's Blood	Nikdo, Bandit #1, Bandit #4	Episode: "Princess of Nothing"	
2021	Star Wars: The Bad Batch	Bolo, Raney, Captured Falleen, Tactical Droid, Scrapper	3 episodes	
2022–present	The Legend of Vox Machina	Vax'ildan "Vax" Vessar, Vorugal, Various voices	Executive producer and writer	
2023–2024	Star Wars: Young Jedi Adventures	Estala Maru, Onderrs, Galjaero Pirate	3 episodes	
2025–present	The Mighty Nein	Caleb Widogast	Executive producer	
TBA	The Dragon King †	Luna Devorans	In production; funded by a Kickstarter campaign	

=== Film ===
List of voice performances in direct-to-video and television films
Year	Title	Role	Crew role, notes	Source
2005	Aquarian Age the Movie	Lancelot Army Commander		CA
2006	Patlabor: The Movie	Det. Kataoka	Bandai Visual dub	CA
2006	Final Fantasy VII: Advent Children	Red XIII		
2009	Redline	Frisbee		
2009	Afro Samurai: Resurrection	Shichigoro		
2010	Planet Hulk	Hiroim		
2012	Sengoku Basara: The Last Party	Ieyasu Tokugawa		
2014	JLA Adventures: Trapped in Time	Aquaman, Batwing Computer		
2014	Iron Man & Captain America: Heroes United	Red Skull		
2015	Tiger & Bunny: The Rising	Lunatic / Yuri Petrov		
2015	The Last: Naruto the Movie	Gaara, Kotetsu Hagane		
2016	Hulk: Where Monsters Dwell	Doctor Strange		
2023	Lego Marvel Avengers: Code Red	Red Skull, Hydra Goons	Disney+ special	
2024	Ghost Cat Anzu	Policeman 1	English dub	
2025	Lego Marvel Avengers; Strange Tails	Doctor Strange, Red Skull	Disney + special	

=== Other dubbing ===
List of voice performances in other dubbing
Year	Title	Role	Crew role, notes	Source
2005	One Missed Call	Hiroshi Yamashita		CA

=== Video games ===
List of voice performances in video games
Year	Title	Role	Crew role, notes	Source
2004	Seven Samurai 20XX	Natoe		
2004	Obscure	Kenny Matthews		
2005	Castlevania: Curse of Darkness	Isaac		
2006	Tales of the Abyss	Dist the Rose		
2006	Dirge of Cerberus: Final Fantasy VII	Incidental characters		
2006	Valkyrie Profile 2: Silmeria	Lezard Valeth		
2006–07	.hack//G.U. series	Endrance	Rebirth, Reminisce, Redemption	
2006–18	Naruto video games	Gaara, Kotetsu Hagane		
2007	Eternal Sonata	Waltz		
2007	Jeanne d'Arc	Luther		
2007	World of Warcraft: The Burning Crusade	Illidan Stormrage, Talon King Ikiss, Darkweaver Syth		
2007–present	Persona (series)	Akihiko Sanada, Officer Kurosawa (3R)		
2008	Devil May Cry 4	Sanctus	Also did the motion capture for Sanctus	
2008	Professor Layton and the Unwound Future	Dr. Alain Stahngun / Dimitri Allen		
2008	Tales of Vesperia	Cumore		
2008	Final Fantasy IV	Kain Highwind	3D remake	
2008	Command & Conquer Red Alert 3	Akula Submarine	(Voice)	
2008	World of Warcraft: Wrath of the Lich King	Marwyn		
2009	Dragon Age: Origins	Additional voices		
2009	Kamen Rider: Dragon Knight	Wrath, Trash Mob B		
2009	Magna Carta II	Huaren Jass		
2009	Resident Evil 5	Reynard Fisher, others		
2009	MadWorld	Additional voices		
2009	Terminator Salvation	Resistance Fighter		
2009	Undead Knights	Lord Follis		
2009	Red Faction: Guerrilla	Daniel Mason		
2009	The Saboteur	Additional voices		
2010	Lost Planet 2			
2010	Final Fantasy XIII	Cocoon Inhabitants		
2010	Darksiders	War		
2010	Call of Duty: Black Ops	USA Soldier		
2010	Sengoku Basara: Samurai Heroes	Ieyasu Tokugawa		
2010	Fallout: New Vegas	Various characters		
2010	Fable III	Walla Voice Actors		
2010	NieR	Grimoire Weiss, additional voices	Uncredited in Gestalt's endgame credits; also in Replicant ver.1.22474487139...	
2010	Supreme Commander 2	Jaran Kael	Aeon Illuminate character	
2010	Kane & Lynch 2: Dog Days	Mercenary		
2010	Mafia II	Brian O'Neill		
2010	Valkyria Chronicles II	Baldren Gassenarl		
2010	World of Warcraft: Cataclysm	Illidan Stormrage		
2010	StarCraft II	Ghost (Terran Unit)		
2011	Captain America: Super Soldier	Howard Stark, Allied, Hydra		
2011	Catherine	Orlando Haddick	Reprises role in the 2019 remake/expansion Catherine: Full Body	
2011	Dissidia 012 Final Fantasy	Kain Highwind		
2011	Killzone 3	Voice Talent ISA		
2011	Dungeon Siege III	Alexei / Roderick / Additional voices		
2011	Rise of Nightmares	Marchosias		
2011	Uncharted 3: Drake's Deception	Hired Thugs		
2011	White Knight Chronicles 2	Madoras		
2011	Professor Layton and the Last Specter	Clark Triton		
2011	The Lord of the Rings: War in the North	Eredan / Elledan / Elrohir		
2011	Call of Duty: Modern Warfare 3	Additional voices		
2012	Asura's Wrath	Asura		
2012	Prototype 2	Additional voices		
2012	Final Fantasy XIII-2	Caius Ballad		
2012	NeverDead	Alex		
2012	Binary Domain	Additional voices		
2012	Darksiders II	War		
2012	Skullgirls	Leviathan		
2012	Spec Ops: The Line	Marines, Exile Officer		
2012	World of Warcraft: Mists of Pandaria	Sha of Violence, Chi-Ji		
2012	Resident Evil 6	Civilians		
2012	Call of Duty: Black Ops II	Multiplayer Voice Talent	Also voiced David "Section" Mason in E3 Demo	
2013	Fire Emblem Awakening	Inigo		
2013	Aliens: Colonial Marines	Dr. Richard "Rick" Levy		
2013	Tomb Raider	Solarii		
2013	League of Legends	Yasuo		
2013	BioShock Infinite	Additional voices		
2013	Fuse	Guards		
2013	The Last of Us	The Infected, Additional voices		
2013	The Bureau: XCOM Declassified	Nico DaSilva, Sectoid		
2013	Saints Row IV	The Voices of Virtual Steelport		
2013	Killer Is Dead	David, Narrator		
2013	Marvel Heroes	Electro, Nightcrawler, Havok, Angel		
2013	Republique	Station 14	Episode 3: "Ones and Zeroes"	
2013	Batman: Arkham Origins	S.W.A.T. Officers		
2013	Grand Theft Auto V	The Local Population		
2013	Infinity Blade III	Additional voices		
2014	D4: Dark Dreams Don't Die	Phillip Cheney		
2014	Hearthstone	Illidan Stormrage		
2014	Lightning Returns: Final Fantasy XIII	Caius Ballad		
2014	Middle-earth: Shadow of Mordor	Gollum		
2014	inFamous: Second Son	Male Pedestrian #4		
2014	The Evil Within	Valerio Jimenez, Male Villager, Obese Zombie		
2014	Space Run	Buck Mann		
2014	The Elder Scrolls Online	Male Breton #1, Male Bosmer, Skeleton		
2014	Skylanders: Trap Team	Luminous		
2014	Lego Batman 3: Beyond Gotham	Black Hand, Deathstroke, Dr. Fate, Etrigan The Demon, Mr. Freeze, Red Tornado, Reverse-Flash, The Question	Credited under "Voice Talent"	
2014	Transformers: Rise of the Dark Spark	Autobot Flyer, Decepticon Soldier 02		
2014	How to Train Your Dragon: School of Dragons	Tuffnut		
2015	Final Fantasy Type-0 HD	Enkidu		
2015	Saints Row: Gat out of Hell	William Shakespeare, Vlad the Impaler, Demons, Husks		
2015	The Order: 1886	Finley		
2015	Mad Max	Gutgash		
2015	Transformers: Devastation	Motormaster, Seeker #3		
2015	Heroes of the Storm	Illidan Stormrage		
2015-17	Lego Dimensions		Credited under "Voice Talent"	
2016	The Witness	N/A	Voice director	
2016	Lego Marvel's Avengers	Red Skull	Voice director	
2016	Fallout 4: Far Harbor	Allen Lee, Keith McKinney, Knight-Captain Larsen		
2016	Space Run: Galaxy	Buck Mann		
2016	Street Fighter V	Gill	Appears in later revision of closing credits, playable as DLC character in 2019	
2016	World of Warcraft: Legion	Illidan Stormrage		
2016	Titanfall 2	Robert "Barker" Taube		
2017	For Honor	The Warden (Male)		
2017	Horizon Zero Dawn: The Frozen Wilds	Umnak		
2017	Injustice 2	Reverse-Flash, Brainiac 5		
2017	Marvel vs. Capcom: Infinite	Doctor Strange		
2017	Middle-earth: Shadow of War	Gollum, Daughter's Suitor		
2017	Sonic Forces	Infinite		
2018	Dissidia Final Fantasy NT	Kain Highwind		
2018	Pillars of Eternity II: Deadfire	Vax'ildan Vessar, Serafen	Critical Role DLC	
2018	Fallout 76	Knight Tex Rogers, Doctor Kessle, Ranger Simon		
2018	Marvel Powers United VR	Doctor Strange		
2018	Darksiders III	War		
2019	Marvel Ultimate Alliance 3: The Black Order	Black Bolt, Destroyer, Doctor Strange, Nightcrawler, Red Skull		
2019	Marvel Dimension of Heroes	Doctor Strange	Augmented reality game for mobile devices	
2019	Death Stranding	AI Voice, Veteran Porter		
2019	DOOM³: BFG Edition	Voice performers	Remaster	
2020	Gears Tactics	Richard Prescott		
2020	The Last of Us Part II	The Infected, Firefly on the radio, additional voices		
2020	Kingdoms of Amalur: Re-Reckoning	Assyr		
2022	Guild Wars 2: End of Dragons	Archemorus		
2022	Return to Monkey Island	Quarantined Pirate		
2023	Guild Wars 2: Secrets of the Obscure	Mabon		
2024	Alone in the Dark	Herr Stern		
2024	Marvel Rivals	Doctor Strange		
2025	Date Everything!	Friar Errol		
2025	Dispatch	Lightningstruck		
2026	Trails in the Sky 2nd Chapter	Professor Weissman, additional voices		
2026	Castlevania: Belmont's Curse	Isaac		
2026	Order of the Sinking Star	The Warrior		

=== Live action ===
List of acting performances
Year	Title	Role	Notes	Source
2015	The Phoenix Incident	Jacob Reynolds		
Web series
2015–present	Critical Role	Vax'ildan "Vax" Vessar (campaign 1)	Cast member; creator-owned actual play web series	
2015–present	Critical Role	Caleb Widogast (campaign 2)	Cast member; creator-owned actual play web series	
2015–present	Critical Role	Orym of the Air Ashari (campaign 3)	Cast member; creator-owned actual play web series	
2015–present	Critical Role	Halandil Fang (campaign 4)	Cast member; creator-owned actual play web series	
2017	Sagas of Sundry: Madness	Emmett Markham	Main role. An anthology limited series.	
2018–2020	All Work No Play	Himself	A web series where O'Brien and Sam Riegel catch up over a drink and try a new activity each episode. The show was developed from their original AWNP podcast (2012–2017).	
2020	AWNP: Unplugged	Himself	A spinoff web series during the COVID-19 pandemic where Riegel and O'Brien caught-up via video chat.	
2021	Exandria Unlimited	Orym of the Air Ashari	Main role; 8 episodes. An anthology spinoff series of Critical Role.	
2023–2024	Candela Obscura: The Circle of Tide & Bone	Cosmo Grimm	Main role; 3 episodes. An anthology limited series.	
2024	Candela Obscura: The Circle of the Crimson Mirror	Game Master	Main role; 3 episodes. An anthology limited series.	
2024	Moonward	Walden Orlock	Main role; a spinoff limited series of Midst.	
2025	Exandria Unlimited: Divergence	Erro Mordaurum	Main role; 4 episodes	
2025	Age of Umbra	Skreev	Actual play limited series using the Daggerheart system	

=== Audio books ===
List of voice performances in Audio Books
Year	Title	Role	Crew role, notes	Source
2021	Critical Role: Vox Machina – Kith & Kin	Vax'ildan "Vax" Vessar		
2022	Critical Role: The Mighty Nein – The Nine Eyes of Lucien	Caleb Widogast		
2025	Critical Role: Vox Machina – Stories Untold	Narrator	Co-Author	
2026	Critical Role: Mighty Nein – Stories Untold	Narrator		
