= Akira Yamaoka =

Japanese composer and sound designer (born 1968)

- 山岡 晃
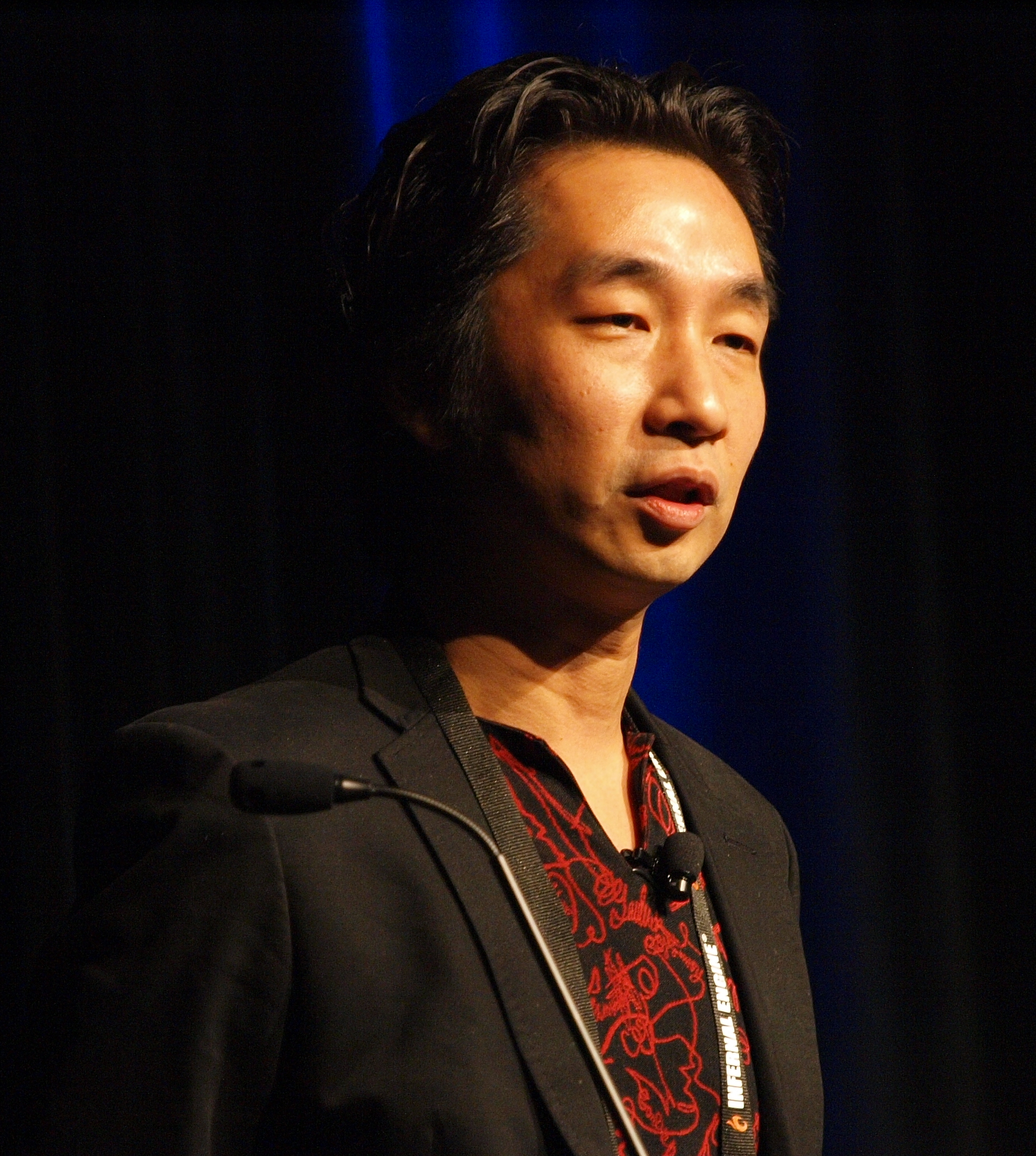
- Yamaoka in March 2010
- Born: February 6, 1968 (age 58); Niigata, Japan
- Occupations: Composer; sound designer; producer; guitarist
- Years active: 1991–present
- Spouse: Tamu Murata
- Musical career
- Genres: Video game; ambient; rock; industrial rock
- Instrument: Guitar
- Website: akirayamaoka.jp

Akira Yamaoka (山岡 晃, Yamaoka Akira; born February 6, 1968) is a Japanese composer and sound designer. He has scored almost every installment of Konami's horror video game series Silent Hill since 1999, also producing some of the entries and composing for three film adaptations. He has been the sound director at Grasshopper Manufacture since 2010 and has served as director and sound designer at Supertrick Games since 2018.

== Early life ==
Akira Yamaoka was born in Niigata on February 6, 1968. He sought to become a designer, but instead became a musician whilst studying product design and interior design at Tokyo Art College.

== Career ==
Yamaoka joined Konami on September 21, 1993. He immediately began to work on the games Contra: Hard Corps, Sparkster, and Sparkster: Rocket Knight Adventures 2. Shortly thereafter, he worked on the music for the PC Engine and Sega CD versions of Snatcher.

When Konami began searching for a musician to compose the score for Silent Hill, Yamaoka volunteered because he thought he was the only one capable of making the soundtrack. Although initially hired as a composer, he soon became involved in the game's overall sound design. He later named Silent Hill 2 as his favorite of his own soundtracks.

On December 2, 2009, it was announced that Yamaoka was leaving Konami. On February 3, 2010, he joined Grasshopper Manufacture and began working with Goichi Suda and Shinji Mikami on their action game Shadows of the Damned. He was first appointed to the role of chief sound officer at Grasshopper, but became involved in aspects of game production as well.

On August 10, 2012, Yamaoka announced he would be releasing a second solo album in late 2012 that would be "different from the usual Silent Hill music". On October 31, he announced that the new three-track Spanish-language EP Revolución would premiere at V-CON during a live performance. In 2014, he expressed interest in returning as a composer for Silent Hills, although the project was later cancelled.

From late October to early November 2015, Yamaoka and his band travelled to the United Kingdom for their Silent Hill Live tour, during which they performed songs from the Silent Hill series at venues in Brighton, Bristol, Cardiff, Glasgow, London, Manchester, and Southampton. In July 2016, he performed live at the BitSummit 4th indie game festival in Kyoto.

== Style and influences ==
Yamaoka has named Suda51 as his favorite game creator and No More Heroes (2007) as his favorite video game. He has also named Dario Argento's Suspiria (1977) as his favorite film.

In July 2010, Yamaoka was invited by the website Nintendo Life to curate a short playlist for a new series exploring "the musical tastes of notable video game creators and figures". His playlist consisted of "Moon Over Moscow" by Visage, "Der Mussolini" by Deutsch Amerikanische Freundschaft, "Amber" by Craig Armstrong, "Moments in Love" by Art of Noise, and "The Ecstasy of Gold" by Ennio Morricone. He further cited "Moon Over Moscow" as the earliest song that made him want to pursue music, and revealed that he wanted "The Ecstasy of Gold" to be played at his funeral.

When asked in February 2014 which other artists influenced him, Yamaoka cited Trent Reznor of Nine Inch Nails as his "main inspiration, both performing and in music style". He later said that his work on Silent Hill was directly influenced by Reznor, composer Angelo Badalamenti's work with filmmaker David Lynch (especially Twin Peaks), and the more atmospheric songs by Depeche Mode and Metallica.

On the topic of whether his studies at Tokyo Art College helped him in his musical career, Yamaoka explained, "At that time, Mick Karn of Japan, Steve Strange of Visage, and a lot of other musicians combined the notions of art and music with their own new style. I got really influenced by that. Therefore, every time I write songs, I try to combine art and music." He has also stated that he derives much of his influence from baroque styles common throughout the 18th century.

== Personal life ==
Yamaoka is married to fellow musician Ai "Tamu" Murata, best known as former drummer of the heavy metal band Nemophila. They have two daughters together.

In March 2011, Yamaoka auctioned off some of his musical instruments to raise funds for charity after the Tōhoku earthquake and tsunami.

== Works ==
=== Video games ===
Year	Title	Notes
1991	Smart Ball	with Yasuhiko Fukuda and Manabu Saito
1994	Contra: Hard Corps	with several others
1994	Sparkster	with several others
1994	Sparkster: Rocket Knight Adventures 2	with Michiru Yamane
1994	Snatcher	PC Engine version, Sega CD version, PlayStation version, Sega Saturn version
1996	Gradius Deluxe Pack	with Miki Higashino, Kiyohiko Yamane, and Motoaki Furukawa
1996	Ganbare Goemon: Uchū Kaizoku Akogingu	with several others
1996	Road Rage/Speed King	PlayStation version
1996	Lightning Legend: Daigo no Daibouken	"Spring's Undersea Walking Hurricane (Rankerk Hatred)"
1997	Moon: Remix RPG Adventure	"Tears of Machine" and "TILT"
1997	International Superstar Soccer Pro 98	with several others
1997	Nagano Winter Olympics '98	with Soshiro Hokkai and Keiko Fukami
1998	Poy Poy 2	
1998	NBA In The Zone '98	with Yuichi Asami, Ryuichi Inoue, and Nobuhiko Matsufuji
1998	Kensei: Sacred Fist	with Kyoran Suzuki and Norikazu Miura
1999	Silent Hill	
1999	ISS Pro Evolution	with Shinji Enomoto, Kosuke Soeda, and Hideki Kasai
1999–2012	Bemani series	
2000	Gradius III and IV	
2000	ESPN MLS GameNight	with Shinji Enomoto, Kosuke Soeda, and Hideki Kasai
2001	Silent Hill 2	
2002	Contra: Shattered Soldier	with Sota Fujimori
2003	Silent Hill 3	
2004	Rumble Roses	with several others
2004	Silent Hill 4: The Room	
2006	Rumble Roses XX	with several others
2007	Silent Hill: The Arcade	with Masayuki Maruyama and Jun Ito
2007	Silent Hill: Origins	
2007	Silent Hill: The Escape	
2008	Silent Hill: Homecoming	
2008	Otomedius Gorgeous!	arrangements
2009	Silent Hill: Shattered Memories	
2010	No More Heroes 2: Desperate Struggle	with several others
2011	Shadows of the Damned	
2011	Rebuild of Evangelion: Sound Impact	arrangements
2012	Sine Mora	
2012	Liberation Maiden	
2012	Lollipop Chainsaw	music director
2012	Silent Hill: Book of Memories	guitarist on "Love Psalm (Book of Memories)"
2012	Black Knight Sword	
2013	Rotolla	
2013	Killer Is Dead	music director
2014	Ranko Tsukigime's Longest Day	
2014	Murasaki Baby	"Neeko"
2015	Persona 4: Dancing All Night	"Time To Make History" remix
2016	Puzzle & Dragons X	with Kenji Ito, Yuzo Koshiro, and Keigo Ozaki
2016	The Silver Case	arrangements, "WHITEOUT"
2016	Let It Die	music director
2017	Astro Boy: Edge of Time	
2017	World of Tanks	"Battle in Japan" with Andrius Klimka
2018	The 25th Ward: The Silver Case	with Baiyon, Erika Ito, and Masafumi Takada
2020	Dead by Daylight	Chapter XVI: Silent Hill
2020	Ninjala	with several others
2020	World of Tanks	"Mirny-13 – Hangar Theme" with Aleksandr Khilko and Aleksey Vanchuk
2021	The Medium	with Arkadiusz Reikowski
2022	Deathverse: Let It Die	
2023	Decarnation	
2023	Stray Souls	
2024	Silent Hill: The Short Message	
2024	Silent Hill 2	Remake
2024	Slitterhead	
2025	Silent Hill f	with Kensuke Inage, Dai, and Koichi "Xaki" Sakita
2025	Let It Die: Inferno	Sound Director
2025	Total Chaos	with several others; theme and end credits
2026	Pathologic 3	composer of an original track

=== Films ===
Year	Title	Notes
2006	Silent Hill	with Jeff Danna, also executive producer
2011	Julia X	"Julia's Wish"
2012	Silent Hill: Revelation	with Jeff Danna
2017	Kuso	with Flying Lotus, Aphex Twin, Thundercat, and various others
2023	Joshurei	
2026	Return to Silent Hill	also executive producer

=== Anime ===
Year	Title	Notes
2013	Patema Inverted	sound director
2022	Cyberpunk: Edgerunners	Anime series based on Cyberpunk 2077

=== Albums ===
Year	Title	Notes
2001	Art of Silent Hill	"Fukuro", "Ki-No-Ko" and "Caramel Mix"
2003	Lost Memories "The Art & Music of Silent Hill"	"Usagi"
2006	iFuturelist	
2011	Play for Japan: The Album	He was responsible for conceiving, organizing, and leading the album.
2011	Sdatcher	An episodic radio drama prequel of Snatcher
2012	Revolución	
2012	"Rinkaku (Eternal Slumber Mix)" by Dir En Grey	
2013	"Rose Cat" by World 1-2	with various others
2014	"Sustain the Untruth (Remix)" by Dir En Grey	
2016	Enn Mo Takenawa "Yuigon Zakura"	
2025	A Letter Buried in Time	
2026	(EN)LIGHTEN (Director Cut)	with Altrr
