= Hiro Fujikake =

Japanese composer, conductor and synthesizer player

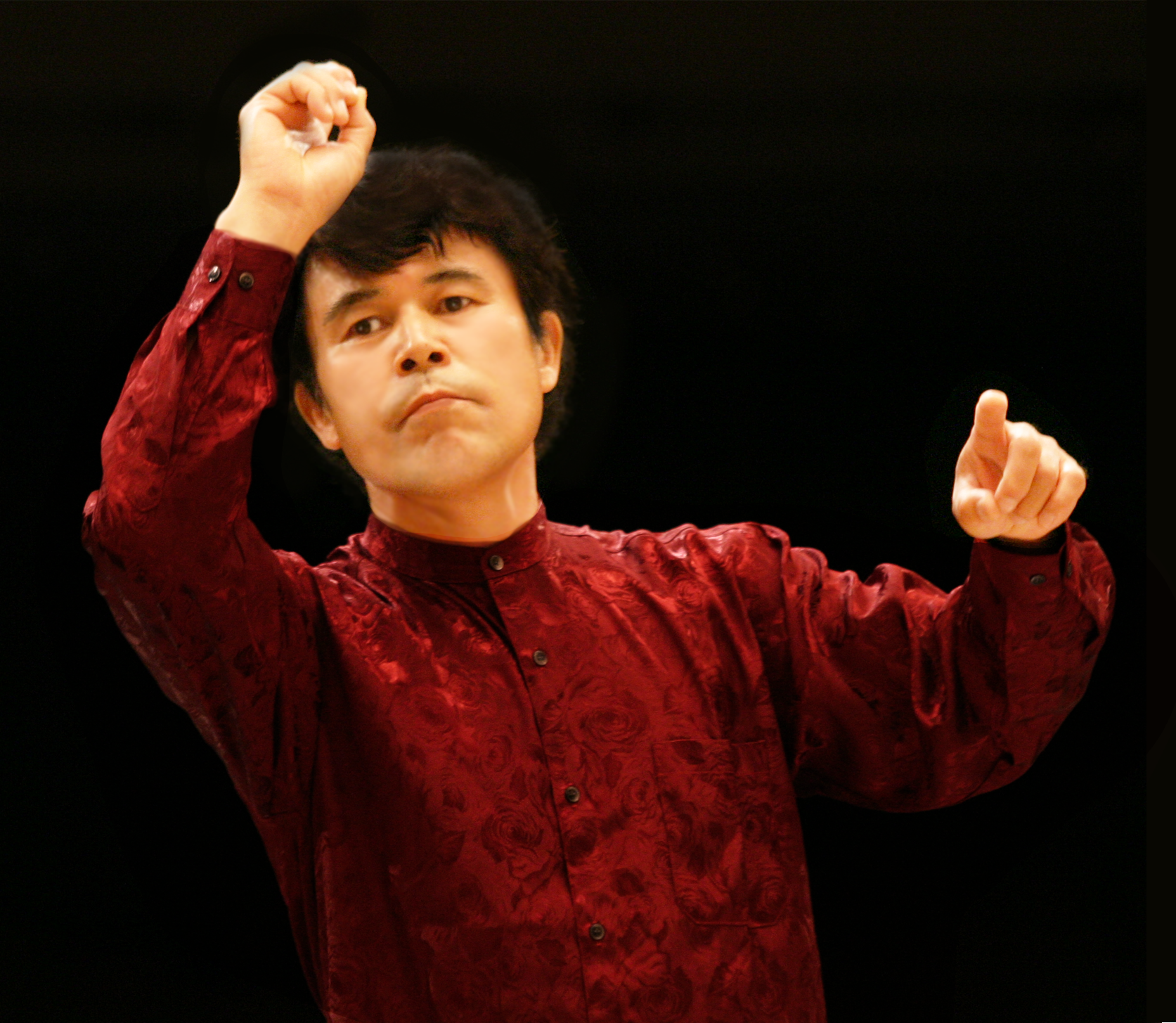
- Born: Hiroyuki Fujikake; Japan, Gifu Prefecture
- Occupations: Composer; Conductor; Producer; Synthesizer player
- Years active: 1974–present
- Website: https://muse-factory.com/en/

Hiroyuki Fujikake (born 1949), also known by his pen name Hiro Fujikake, is a Japanese composer, conductor and synthesizer player.

== Life ==
Hiro Fujikake was born in 1949 in Gifu Prefecture, Japan. In 1964 he began his musical studies at the High School. Later he attended the Aichi Prefectural University of Fine Arts and Music in Aichi where he studied composition for four years to complete his bachelor's degree. He studied a further three years to get the Master of Music at the same university.

Fujikake has won numerous awards for his compositions. Such as the Ongaku-no-tomo Composition Prize for "Two Poems for Chorus" in 1970. The second prize of the NHK Mainichi Music Competition for "Threnody" in 1974. The All Japan Band Association's Test Piece Composition Prize for "Concertino Overture" in 1975. The Japan Mandolin Union Composition Prize for "Pastoral Fantasy" in 1975. The first prize at the Sasagawa competition for "Nostalgic Rhapsody" in 1975 and "Chaconne" in 1976. Japan Symphony Foundation's Composition Prize for "The Song of Spring" in 1990. The Grand Prix at the Queen Elisabeth Music Competition in Belgium for the symphonic work "The Rope Crest" in 1977.

His compositional artwork is characterized by a wide variety of symphonies to operas on ballets, musicals, works for concert band, mandolin orchestra and traditional Japanese instruments, working for the radio, the television, film and for special occasions such as exhibitions such as World Design Exhibition in 1989 in Nagoya.

Besides composer he is also a performing artist of the synthesizer in his solo band named as "Solo Orchestra", which is a synthesizer orchestra directed and controlled by Hiro Fujikake alone assisted by computer. But usually he is accompanied by Japanese taiko drummers, singer, chorus, violinist, flutist, mandolin players, and musicians on Chinese musical instruments, etc.

Along with the flutist James Galway, he has recorded two CDs; the CD The Enchanted Forest was recorded in 1990 in the United States spent five months in the Billboard Top 10 of the Classical crossover section. He is a member of the Project Committee of the Nippon Music Foundation.

== Style ==
His works present a union of Eastern and Western music. Sometimes he integrates jazz and rock music. Natural elements (such as water sounds) also appear in his works.

== Compositions ==
=== Orchestral works ===
- 1974 Threnody
- 1977 The Rope Crest
- 1988 The Spirit of Nature
- 1989 Hiroshima Spirit – As The Life of the New World
- 1990 The Song of Spring
- 1993 Gifu, a symphony for orchestra with Japanese taiko drums
- 2003 Spring Sprung
- 2004 Izumo, a symphony for orchestra and synthesizer
  1. Andante Moderato Maestoso "Beginning"
  2. Andante cantabile con espressione "Love and Love"
  3. Allegro con fuoco "Encounter"
  4. Moderato Maestoso "Soar to the World"

== Works for band ==
- 1975 Concertino Overture
- 1975 Nostalgic Rhapsody
- 1976 Concert Overture
- 1976 Chaconne
- 1983 Hakuho Rhapsody
- 1991 Rock'n March
- (Hakuhou Rhapsody)

== Ballets ==
- 1988 Ah! Nomugi Toge

== Musicals ==
- 1995 A Tale of Little Lives
- 1999 Bunna

== Choral music ==
- 1970 Two Poems for Chorus
- 1989 Hiroshima Spirit – As The Life of the New World for mixed choir, flute solo and orchestra

== Works for guitar ==
- 1999 Capriccio Sakura for guitar orchestra

== Works for mandolin orchestra ==
- 1974 Merchen No.1
- 1975, Pastoral Fantasy
- 1976 Merchen No.2
- 1976 Barades 8
- 1977 Jhongara pour l'orchester de Mandolins
- 1978 Stabat Mater
- 1978 Poetical 2 pieces
- 1979 Serenade No.1
- 1979 Serenade No.2
- 1981 Grand Chaconne
- 1981 Ode for Spring
- 1982 Goh: A Chance Meeting for mandolin orchestra and Japanese taiko drums
- 1983 Variations on "The Moon over the Ruined Castle"
- 1984 Ode for Dawn
- 1989 Song of Lives
- 1990 Tre Pick Prelude
- 1990 Angel Chorus
- 1994 Viva! Mandolin
- 1995 Muse Concerto
- 1995 Fantasia Kyushu
- 1996 Stars concerto
- 1998 Calling from Underground
- 1999 Capriccio Sakura
- 1999 Forest Symphony
- 1999 Aqua Rhythm
- 2001 Suite from the opera "Song of Papermaking Girls"
- Suite from the opera "Sun Legend (The Vanished Sun)"

== Electronic music ==
- 1979 Galactic Symphony
  1. Prelude
  2. Allegro
  3. Adagio
  4. Allegro Scherzando
  5. Passacaglia
- 1984 Romance
- 1989 Synthesizer Fantasy
- 1992 Lotusland in the Sky for orchestra (keyboard and computer)
- 1998 Full Blooming for orchestra (keyboard and computer)
- 2000 Wings to Eternity for orchestra (keyboard and computer)
