= Illidan Stormrage =

- Warcraft character
- Illidan Stormrage in Heroes of the Storm
- First appearance: Warcraft III: Reign of Chaos (2002)
- Created by: Blizzard Entertainment
- Voiced by: Matthew Yang King (Warcraft III); Liam O'Brien (World of Warcraft, Heroes of the Storm)

In-universe information
- Race: Demon, former night elf
- Gender: Male

Illidan Stormrage is a fictional character who appears in the Warcraft series of video games by Blizzard Entertainment.

Born a night elf and sorcerer, his pursuit of power led him to commit several horrific acts against his own people, which earned him the nickname "the Betrayer" and to become the first Demon Hunter. Self-proclaimed the Lord of Outland, he joined the Burning Legion and became a partial demon himself as part of a plan to destroy the Legion from within. Illidan also appears as a playable character in the crossover multiplayer online battle arena game Heroes of the Storm. The character is one of the most notable and popular in the Warcraft franchise and has received positive critical reception from video game players. Illidan was voiced by Matthew Yang King in Warcraft III: Reign of Chaos and its expansion The Frozen Throne, and by Liam O'Brien since World of Warcraft: The Burning Crusade.

== Development ==
In an interview with Warcraft developers Scott Mercer and Greg Street, Mercer mentioned that "we realized [...] Illidan had appeared many times in the concept art and the other material surrounding the expansion, but very few players ever actually saw him in the game itself. To most heroes, Illidan was a bit like Sauron from The Lord of the Rings; he was an omnipresent evil that they would hear about, but never actually meet in a face-to-face confrontation." This resulted in the developers putting in more effort to ensure that players experience "more personal connection[s]" with characters such as Illidan.

== Appearances ==
The night elf was born before the War of the Ancients, a conflict that erupted over 10,000 years prior to the Third War, when the chaotic Burning Legion first invaded Azeroth, attracted by the magical Well of Eternity. Driven by his thirst for power and his desire to impress Tyrande Whisperwind, Illidan made a pact with the Legion to secure the entrance of its leader, Sargeras, into Azeroth, largely by the energy of the Well of Eternity; this act earned Illidan the nickname of "Betrayer". The efforts of Malfurion Stormrage, Illidan's twin brother, disrupted the Legion's plot, with Illidan himself turning to his side and assisting in the demons' defeat. After recreating the destroyed Well of Eternity, Illidan was imprisoned for thousands of years.

During the Third War, Tyrande released Illidan from millennia of imprisonment, hoping that the Betrayer would redeem himself by battling a returned Burning Legion. Though Illidan fought to defend his people, he soon slipped into darkness; after absorbing the energies of the demonic Skull of Gul'dan, Illidan became a demon, an act for which he was banished by Malfurion. Fleeing the wrath of the night elves, the twice-condemned Illidan allied himself once again with the only entity that would accept him—the Legion. Illidan's demonic masters sent him to destroy the Lich King, who had broken free of their influence, but Illidan failed to do so. To protect himself from the Legion's vengeance, Illidan hid on Outland, a destroyed world that he would seek to rule with the help of a few fellow Legion members-turned-outcasts. Illidan is a raid boss and the primary antagonist to the World of Warcraft expansion The Burning Crusade. He was slain by Maiev Shadowsong, his former jailer turned prisoner, in a coup d'état initiated by Akama and player adventurers.

Illidan was featured in flashback quests in the two expansion packs immediately following The Burning Crusade. In Wrath of the Lich King, the player plays the role of Arthas in his duel with Illidan outside Icecrown Citadel (from the end of The Frozen Throne); in Cataclysm, the player takes the role of Illidan himself in the Felwood, claiming the Skull of Gul'dan and killing the demon Tichondrius (from Reign of Chaos). He also appears in the Well of Eternity dungeon released later in Cataclysm, where the players travel back in time 10,000 years to the end of the War of the Ancients.

Illidan returns in Legion, the sixth expansion to World of Warcraft. A teaser cinematic shows Gul'dan from the alternate Draenor (shown in Warlords of Draenor) discovering Illidan's corpse encased in a crystal prison in the Vault of the Wardens. He appears briefly in cinematic cutscenes during the Demon Hunter introduction storyline (the first half of which begins shortly before Illidan's death in The Burning Crusade), sending his acolytes to a world called Mardum to retrieve a demonic artifact, the Sargerite Keystone, that would allow his forces to attack any world held by the Burning Legion. The Demon Hunters succeed and return to Outland, only to find Illidan has been slain; the Hunters are consequently imprisoned with Illidan's corpse in the Vault of the Wardens. A questline playable by all classes involves the naaru, crystalline beings that embody the Holy Light, seeking to resurrect Illidan as the chosen champion against the Legion. The player takes the role of Illidan during certain climactic battles in his past, including his death at the Black Temple.

After Gul'dan's defeat, Illidan is freed from a crystal that Gul'dan had attempted to manipulate; Illidan then kills Gul'dan and challenges the players to join him in defeating the Burning Legion. Illidan is also involved in the final battle against Kil'jaeden aboard his Legion command ship in orbit of Argus, the former homeworld of the Draenei race. When Kil'jaeden is defeated, Illidan uses the Sargerite Keystone (reclaimed by Demon Hunter players in the Vault of the Wardens dungeon) to open a rift back to Azeroth, but the rift remains open, causing Argus to appear in the skies above.

After arriving on Argus aboard the Draenei vessel, the Vindicaar, fighting off the Legion's initial attack and meeting up with Turalyon and Xe'ra's Army of the Light (to which Turalyon belongs), Illidan is brought before the Prime Naaru, Xe'ra. Xe'ra offers Illidan a chance to be reborn as a champion of the Light, the Naaru's Chosen One, but Illidan refuses, saying that his scars and his sacrifices make him who he is. Xe'ra restrains Illidan and attempts to force the Light upon him, but Illidan breaks free and destroys Xe'ra, angering Turalyon. He strikes at Illidan, but Illidan catches Turalyon's blade, stating there can be no chosen one for only they can save themselves.

During the cinematic following the defeat of Argus the Unmaker, the last boss of Antorus: The Burning Throne, Illidan elects to remain behind with the resurrected titan Pantheon to act as Sargeras' jailer, saying that all he had done in his life had led up to that moment, to face Sargeras one last time. As Sargeras is pulled away from Azeroth, Illidan is last seen with blades in hand, standing before Sargeras' throne in the Seat of the Pantheon. He leaves behind a message crystal explaining his decision to Tyrande and Malfurion, as well as a final message to the player character, leaving Azeroth's future in their hands.

=== World of Warcraft: Illidan ===
In the novel World of Warcraft: Illidan, written by William King and published by Del Ray Books in April 2017, more details are revealed about Illidan's intentions than was revealed in The Burning Crusade game. The book's main story covers the time from six months before Illidan is slain by the WoW player characters until Illidan's demise. It covers the buildup of the Demon Hunter forces and Illidan's plans on how to defeat the Burning Legion.

=== Heroes of the Storm ===
Illidan appears as a playable character in the crossover MOBA game Heroes of the Storm. He is a melee assassin hero, which trait reduces cooldowns of all his abilities by one second and heals him whenever he uses basic attacks. He also has the ability to move quickly to and jump over his foes, as well as to evade enemy basic attacks for short period of time. Illidan is a mobile, sustained damage assassin with very fast basic attacks and several "gap closers", who pairs well with heroes that can enable him. "Metamorphosis" is one of the two heroic abilities which transform Illidan into "demon form" at the target location. "The Hunt" is the second heroic ability which enables Illidan to charge to target unit, dealing damage on impact and stunning it.

A talent upgrade, called "Demonic Form", allows Illidan to permanently remain in his "demon form", making him even more powerful by increasing his attack speed and reducing the duration of disabling effects.

=== Other appearances ===
Like many other prominent Warcraft characters, Illidan also appears as a collectible card in the game Hearthstone. Additionally, he also appears as an opponent the player must defeat in the tutorial phase of the game. Illidan also became the first hero character of Hearthstone's tenth class, the Demon Hunter, introduced in the April 2020 expansion, Ashes of Outland.

== Reception ==
The character has received mostly positive critical reception. Empire listed Illidan #17 on their list of "the 50 greatest video game characters", writing "Illidan was a force to be reckoned with. By the time you and 24 eager guildies had trekked to the heart of Shadowmoon Valley and stood (attuned) at the gates of the Black Temple, ready to face him, it was all the average warrior could do not to soil his chainmail pants." He was also listed #5 on Matthew Rossi of Engadget's "Top 10 magnificent bastards of Warcraft", since "his actions during and after the war were instrumental in the defeat of the Legion and the preservation of magic. If not for Illidan, there would have been no Nordrassil and no Well atop Hyjal, and Hyjal itself would simply be a very tall mountain. Even after enduring a 10,000-year imprisonment for his actions, Illidan managed to take out a key presence in the Legion by himself and claimed the power of the Skull of Gul'dan in the process." Rossi further wrote that "He is one of the greatest manipulators of arcane power ever to live, the first to ever seek to stalk and kill demons, a prodigy and a madman. He betrayed his own people in order to save them and the entire world, but he always served himself first. Selfish, mercurial, brilliant, resentful and tormented by himself, Illidan Stormrage helped make Azeroth everything it is today." The encounter with Illidan at the Black Temple raid made the list in Digital Spy's "The 10 best moments from World of Warcraft's first decade", with Andy Joannou writing "Before then came Illidan, the final boss encounter for the Black Temple raid. A fan favourite, Black Temple is hailed as one of the raids to define World of Warcraft."

While criticising the constant killing off of villains in Warcraft, Rossi also thought that Illidan's death was unfortunate, as "touted and hyped as the major threat of The Burning Crusade, Illidan's death atop the Black Temple is a waste of a major lore figure not because the fight isn't worthy of him or the culmination of an entire tier of raiding, but because with the release of Sunwell Plateau we find that Illidan wasn't actually the major threat—in fact, he was a stewing, impotently insane figure obsessing over his defeat at the end of Warcraft III and it was Kil'Jaeden who posed the true threat all along." Darren Brown of Engadget mentioned the character as one of the "ultimate boss encounter[s]" in Warcraft. Yannick Lejacq of Kotaku listed the references to the relationship between Tyrande and Illidan as one of the positive aspects of Heroes of the Storm, saying "Tyrande Whisperwind and Illidan Stormrage have a tenuous romantic past from their days together in World of Warcraft [...] It's a little nod to the World of Warcraft fans playing Heroes."

A popular character, Illidan has also often been featured in various merchandise related to the Warcraft franchise. This includes figurines of the character, as well as Halloween costumes. Illidan is also a popular character to cosplay as.
