= Decarnation =

- Developer: Atelier QDB
- Publisher: Shiro Unlimited
- Composer: Akira Yamaoka
- Engine: Unity
- Platforms: Nintendo Switch; Windows
- Release: WW: May 31, 2023
- Genre: Adventure
- Mode: Single-player

Decarnation is a 2023 adventure video game developed by Atelier QDB and published by Shiro Unlimited for Windows and Switch.

== Gameplay ==
Players control a down-on-her-luck Parisian cabaret dancer in 1990. As her career prospects sour, her self esteem and mental health follow. Following a lead that could restart her career, she becomes involved in a psychological horror story. Players must avoid monsters, play minigames, and solve puzzles. It features retro pixel art graphics reminiscent of the fourth generation of video game consoles.

== Development ==
France-based studio Atelier QDB initially developed Decarnation in RPG Maker, but it was later ported to Unity. Shiro Unlimited released it on Windows and Switch on May 31, 2023.

== Reception ==
On Metacritic, Decarnation received positive reviews on Windows and mixed reviews on Switch. Gamezebo called it "incredibly thought-provoking" and praised the story. Nintendo World Report enjoyed the pixel art, atmosphere, and monster design, but they criticized the minigames and puzzles, which they said hold it back from being a good game. They also felt Decarnation went on too long past the climax, which they said unnecessarily drew out the game for another hour.
