= Rocket Knight Adventures =

1993 video game

- North American box art
- Developer: Konami
- Publisher: Konami
- Director: Nobuya Nakazato
- Producer: Tomikazu Kirita
- Designers: Nobuya Nakazato; Shiori Satoh
- Programmers: Kenichiro Horio; Koji Komata; Kenji Miyaoka
- Artist: Yasushi Takano
- Composers: Masanori Oouchi; Aki Hata; Michiru Yamane; Masanori Adachi; Hiroshi Kobayashi
- Series: Rocket Knight
- Platform: Sega Genesis
- Release: JP: August 6, 1993; NA: August 1993; EU: September 1993
- Genres: Platform, scrolling shooter
- Mode: Single-player

Rocket Knight Adventures (Note: Japanese: ロケットナイトアドベンチャーズ, Hepburn: Roketto Naito Adobenchāzu) is a 1993 platform game developed and published by Konami for the Sega Genesis. The player controls Sparkster, an opossum knight who wields a rocket pack and sword, who battles the evil Devotindos Empire.

Rocket Knight Adventures was designed by Nobuya Nakazato, designer of Contra games such as The Alien Wars, Hard Corps, and Shattered Soldier. It received positive reviews.

== Gameplay ==
Screenshot of the first level, where Sparkster is about to be confronted by a Devotindos soldier.

Rocket Knight Adventures is a side-scrolling platform game where the player guides Sparkster through linear levels. The player can jump and attack using Sparkster's sword, which can either hit enemies directly or by emitting energy projectiles that travel a short distance. If the Attack button is held until the blue bar on the top of the screen is filled in, Sparkster will charge a "rocket attack". When the player lets go of the Attack button, Sparkster will perform a rocket attack where he bursts into one of eight directions where the player has inputted on the directional pad or otherwise, a stationary spin attack if no directions are pressed. The rocket attack can be used to rebound off walls, allowing Sparkster to reach higher areas.

Sparkster has a limited amount of vitality that decreases when he is hit by enemies, projectiles or stage hazards. The player will lose one life if either the vitality bar depletes, Sparkster falls into a bottomless pit or outside the stage or touches instant-killing terrain such as spikes in the cart segment of the second stage and the lava at the beginning of the third stage. Sparkster can replenish vitality by collecting apples and bananas, the latter replenishing the most vitality. The amount of vitality replenished depends on the game's difficulty level. The game ends if the player runs out of extra lives, however the player is allowed to use a limited number of continues (except in the Very Hard (Crazy Hard in Japan), where there are no continues) and can start at the beginning of the stage where they got a Game Over. Extra lives can be obtained by collecting 1UP items spread throughout some levels; or by achieving 20,000 points, with each other extra life being obtained every 60,000 points.

The game is composed of seven stages, with each stage composed of several sections and each one ending with a boss fight. Levels are occasionally switched up with alternate styles of gameplay. Some sections of the game are played similar to horizontal scrolling shooters (akin to Gradius, often with in-level references to that game), while the boss fight of the fifth stage has the player controlling a large robot mech to duel with the antagonist Axel Gear.

The game features four difficulty options, with harder difficulties increasing the power of the enemy attacks and reducing the number of lives and continues the player starts with; the hardest starting with no lives and continues, and enemy attacks defeating Sparkster in one hit. The difficulty levels in the game are differently presented in each regional version of the game. Both the Japanese and European versions have two difficulty levels accessible normally via the options menu; while all four difficulties are enabled by default in the American version.

== Plot ==
The first king of Zephyrus (labelled as Zebulos in the international manuals), El Zephyrus (El Zebulos internationally) had led his clan to defeating an evil empire who had constructed a starship known as the Pig Star, which had the power to destroy planets. Knowing the Pig Star would be sought by the evil, the King had magically sealed the starship and protected the "Key to the Seal" by having it guarded and passed by his royal family over generations, and forming an elite group of warriors known as the Rocket Knights to protect the kingdom. Around this time, an orphan named Sparkster was taken in by Mifune Sanjulo; a friend of the King, and current leader of the Rocket Knights. Sparkster was trained to become a Rocket Knight at an early age and would become the new leader of the Rocket Knights after banishing Axel Gear from Zephyrus, a corrupt "Black Knight", for destroying Mifune.

In the events of the game, the kingdom of Zephyrus is invaded by a tribe of pigs known as the Devotindos Empire, led by Emperor Devilgus Devotindos; who has come in search for the key to the seal of the Pig Star. Sparkster heads to the Zephyrus castle to find Axel Gear kidnapping Princess Sherry, who is the one who knows the location to the key. Before Sparkster is able to catch Axel, Axel escapes into a large airship and blows Sparkster away to a nearby desert, prompting Sparkster to chase Axel. Sparkster eventually reaches the Kingdom of Devotindos, and reaches the Devontindos castle to confront Devilgus. Sparkster frees Sherry, while Devilgus escapes into space with the seal key to reach the Pig Star. Sherry casts a spell on Sparkster's rocket pack that allows him to fly in space and reach the Pig Star. Reaching the Pig Star, Sparkster confronts Devilgus in a melee fight; the former destroys Devilgus, who is revealed to be a robot. After a melee fight with Axel Gear which results in his defeat, Sparkster eventually confronts the Pig Star's core, whom was the commanding force of the Devilgus. Sparkster defeats the Core, which triggers a chain reaction that leads to the destruction of the Pig Star.

Sparkster escapes the crumbling fortress in a nearby escape pod, however the Pig Star Core also escapes; the robot chases Sparkster's escape pod in a last-ditch effort to kill Sparkster. The Core burns apart while entering Elhorn's atmosphere while Sparkster lands back safely in Zephyrus, reunites Princess Sherry with King Zephyrus and flies off elsewhere.

== Reception ==
Reception

Review scores
Publication	Score
Beep! MegaDrive	6.75/10
Computer and Video Games	88/100
Edge	7/10
Electronic Gaming Monthly	8/10, 8/10, 8/10, 8/10, 8/10
Famitsu	7/10, 7/10, 7/10, 7/10
Game Informer	8/10
Game Players	9/10
GameFan	90%, 91%, 92%, 90%
GamesMaster	92%
Hyper	84%
Mean Machines Sega	91/100
Dengeki Mega Drive	82/100, 90/100, 76/100, 90/100
Electronic Games	83%
Hippon Super!	6/10
Mega	81%
Mega Action	94%
Mega Drive Advanced Gaming	86%
Mega Power	9/10
MegaTech	92/100
MegaZone	95%
Sega Force Mega	79/100
Sega Power	82%
Sega Pro	89%
Sega Zone	92/100
VideoGames	7/10

Rocket Knight Adventures received a 23.4/30 score in a poll conducted by Mega Drive Fan and a 7.9082/10 score in a 1995 readers' poll conducted by the Japanese Sega Saturn Magazine, ranking among Sega Mega Drive titles at the number 145 spot. The game garnered generally favorable reviews from critics.

== Legacy ==
A SNES version of Rocket Knight Adventures was canceled. The Sparkster character would be advertised as Konami's mascot, appearing on several Konami advertisements and game manuals for a few years following the game's release.

Sparkster: Rocket Knight Adventures 2 was released on the Sega Genesis in 1994. A spin-off game, Sparkster, was released in the same year for the Super Nintendo Entertainment System. A revival of the series, Rocket Knight was released in 2010, developed by British studio Climax Group and released for Xbox 360, PlayStation 3 and Steam. A compilation of the first three games, titled Rocket Knight Adventures: Re-Sparked, was released in June 2024 by Limited Run Games for Nintendo Switch, PlayStation 4, PlayStation 5, and Windows.

Sparkster has appeared as a playable character in games such as New International Track & Field for Nintendo DS and Krazy Kart Racing for iPhone and iPod Touch. He also has cameos in Ganbare Goemon 2: Kiteretsu Shōgun Magginesu for the SNES, Snatcher for the Mega-CD, Jikkyō Power Pro Wrestling '96: Max Voltage for the SNES, and Mitsumete Knight for the PlayStation. He was disguised by Pastel in TwinBee PARADISE in Donburishima for PC, and a figure resembling him also appears in an alternate ending to Contra: Shattered Soldier for the PlayStation 2, and as nonogram pixel on Pixel Puzzle Collection for the iPhone and Android and Picross S: Konami Antiques Edition for Nintendo Switch.
