= Michiru Yamane =

Japanese video game composer (born 1963)

- 山根ミチル
- Born: September 23, 1963 (age 63); Kagawa Prefecture, Japan
- Education: Aichi Prefectural University of the Arts
- Occupations: Video game composer, pianist
- Years active: 1988–present
- Employer: Konami (1988–2008)
- Known for: Castlevania series

Michiru Yamane (Japanese: 山根ミチル, Hepburn: Yamane Michiru; born September 23, 1963) is a Japanese video game composer and pianist. Yamane's musical style draws on baroque, classical and rock traditions, with both Johann Sebastian Bach and Yellow Magic Orchestra as prominent influences. She is best known for her two decades of work at the gaming company Konami, with her compositions for the Castlevania series among her most recognized work.

Yamane grew an interest in music at an early age, practicing on the electric organ and piano. She studied composition in college and began working as a composer for Konami in 1988. As a member of the Konami Kukeiha Club, she collaborated with other musicians on many Konami video games. Her breakthrough work came with the Castlevania games Bloodlines (1994) and Symphony of the Night (1997).

== Early life and education ==
Yamane was born in Kagawa Prefecture, Japan, on September 23, 1963. She began learning electric organ around the age of four, on her family's Yamaha Electone. She also soon began learning piano. Yamane enjoyed playing popular rock music on the organ, but grew a fascination with classical music with her piano studies. She began composing around eight years old, and realized by her teenage years that she wanted to write songs for movies or commercials, or be a jazz pianist. She attended a music high school that specialized in advanced piano courses, and focused her studies around harmonic rhythm, counterpoint, and music theory. Around this time, she also began playing video games at various local arcades. She decided not to compete at performance with virtuoso players, so decided to attend the Aichi Prefectural University of the Arts and focus on their composition courses they offered. In college, she learned how to write music for large orchestras, and did her thesis on German composer Johann Sebastian Bach. She also continued gaming on a friend's Famicom at the time.

== Career ==
=== Konami ===
Yamane started working for Konami in 1988, shortly before her fourth year at college. She held a teaching license at the time, and was teaching part-time, though she felt the job did not suit her. She applied to Konami after finding an open position through her college recruitment office, and was hired. She had never considered specifically becoming a game composer, although she liked games and music.

At Konami, Yamane was a member of the Konami Kukeiha Club, the company's sound team. She was nervous she would be required to do frequency modulation programming, but she was only a composer at first. She would later be introduced to computer music sequencing programs in graduate school. Yamane's first work at the company were the main themes for King's Valley II and Risa no Yōsei Densetsu (1988). She also became involved with the Track and Field games, composing short victory jingles. Following that, she worked on several Game Boy, Famicom, MSX, and arcade games. Many of the first projects she collaborated on were shoot 'em ups, including the Nemesis series and Detana!! TwinBee. She compared the synchronicity of sound in shooters to that of Disney animated films. Yamane felt these games were a good introduction to the "Konami sound" and helped build her foundation. At first, she found it limiting working with only three simultaneous sound channels on the Famicom, given her orchestra composition background, but she grew to enjoy working around the limit over time. She drew motivation from Bach's "Inventions and Sinfonias", which also only used two or three simultaneous notes.

Yamane's first job as a lead composer was with Ganbare Goemon 2 (1989). With this game, she learned how to edit programmable sound generator samples from senior sound programmers. Although she is credited in Contra: Hard Corps, Yamane does not have any memory of composing music for it. She believes it is possible she contributed a few pieces as the sound team was busy with multiple projects at the time. She also worked on Rocket Knight Adventures (1993) and its two sequels; writing music for Sparkster and creating sound effects for Sparkster: Rocket Knight Adventures 2. Akira Yamaoka joined Konami around this time, and worked with Yamane on the latter.

==== Castlevania ====
"Reincarnated Soul, Part 2"
"Reincarnated Soul, Part 2" from the opening stage in Castlevania: Bloodlines. Yamane's Bach influences can be heard.

Yamane is primarily known for her work on the Castlevania series. After moving to Konami's Tokyo office from Kobe, her boss thought she would be a good fit for the Castlevania game in development, Castlevania: Bloodlines (1994). Since the series was already popular and known for good music, she felt pressure to perform well. She was asked to write music based on pre-existing themes introduced in earlier games. Yamane felt there was a link with the game's vampiric themes and the classical music she had grown up with. She worked to integrate her classical style with the rock themes previously introduced in the series. When working on Mega Drive games, Yamane was required to program the music into the game, on top of composition. GamesRadar+ called Bloodlines her first "breakthrough" game soundtrack.

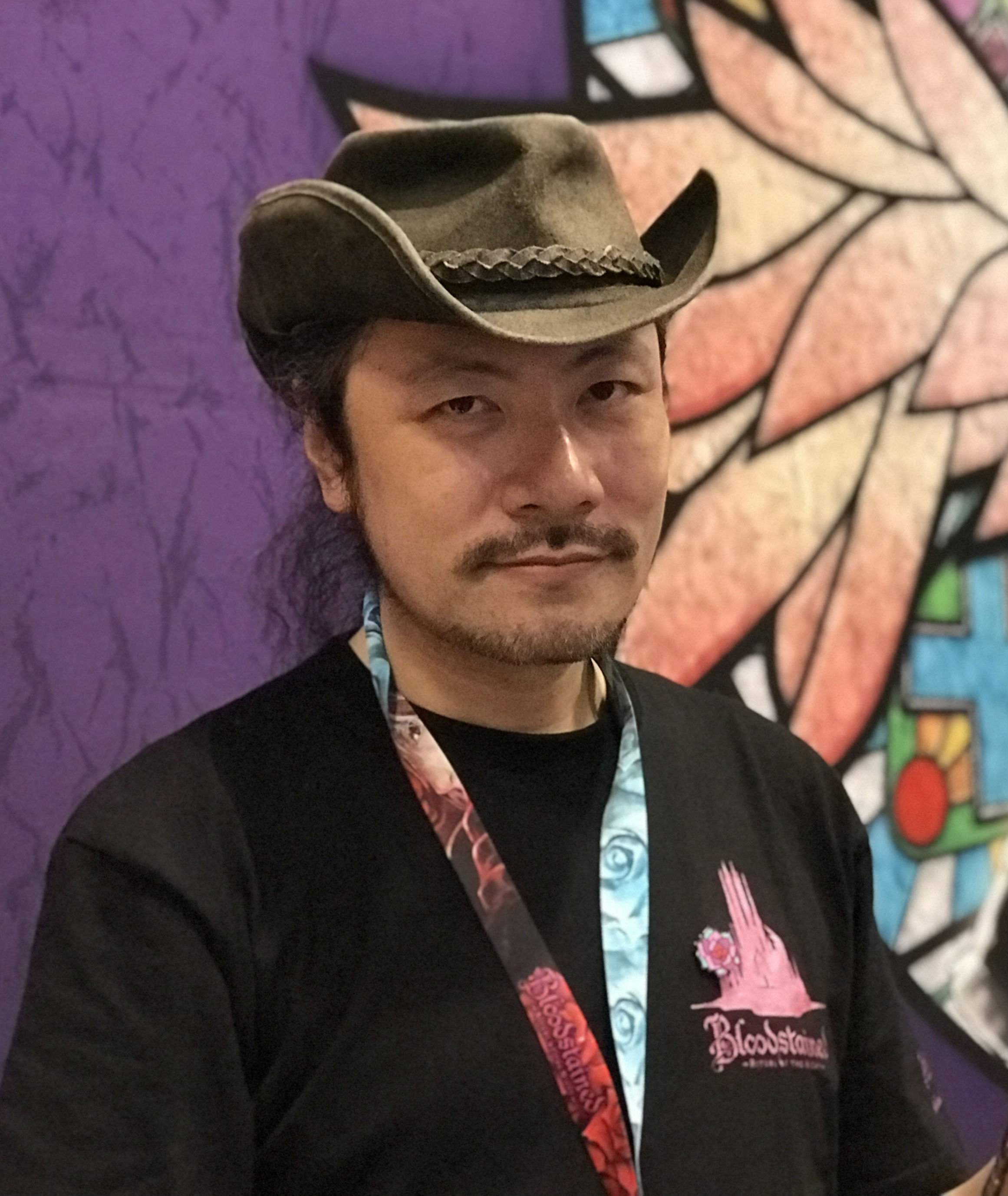
Yamane worked closely with Koji Igarashi, producer for the Castlevania series.

The next game in the series, Castlevania: Symphony of the Night (1997), was developed for the PlayStation. The art director, Osamu Kasai, requested Yamane to join the team. Because it used CD-ROMs, the system was capable of much higher quality music and sound. Yamane felt more expressive freedom as she was no longer limited to FM chips and could use real sounds. For Symphony of the Night, she drew heavy inspiration from concept artwork by Ayami Kojima. She used an Akai sampler connected to a computer running Logic Pro and Pro Tools to record music. The soundtrack was the first time she attempted placing rock music in a game. It remains one of her most popular soundtracks. In addition to the soundtrack, she also produced all the sound effects due to a shortage of staff.

Yamane continued to remain deeply involved with Koji Igarashi and the Castlevania development team after Symphony of the Night, reviewing artwork and scenario writings for further games. She worked on Lament of Innocence (2003) and Curse of Darkness (2005), which made for challenging compositions. She also composed for the Game Boy Advance and Nintendo DS games, which had note limitations like older home consoles. She broadened her listening habits to gain more inspiration and prevent her music from becoming repetitive. On Portrait of Ruin (2006), she collaborated with Yuzo Koshiro. The last Castlevania score she wrote was for Order of Ecclesia (2008), which she worked on with Yasuhiro Ichihashi. She says that her favorite scores were for Aria of Sorrow (2003), Portrait of Ruin, and Order of Ecclesia.

While working on the Castlevania series, Yamane also composed for other games. She contributed to Suikoden III (2002) and Suikoden IV (2004), following in the tracks of Miki Higashino's work on the first two games. After Sota Fujimori joined Konami in 1998, Yamane worked with him on Gungage (1999) and Elder Gate (2000), mixing her classic symphonic style with his modern electronic music. She also worked on the Winning Eleven series and The Sword of Etheria (2005).

=== Freelance ===
After writing music for over 40 games at Konami, Yamane left the company in 2008 to become a freelance composer. She came to this decision after getting a pet cat, and growing a desire to slow down her career and move to working from home. She desired to have more freedom to do projects she wanted, and manage her own time. Since becoming a freelance composer, Yamane has continued to compose for video games, as well as films, commercials, television, and anime. She has considered making a solo album. Games that she has composed for include Otomedius Excellent (2011) and Skullgirls (2012). Although no longer working directly for Konami, she has continued working with the company on Castlevania music. She has also composed for Koji Igarashi's Bloodstained: Ritual of the Night.

Yamane occasionally performs in live concerts. Her first live performance was a song from Symphony of the Night at the Symphonic Game Music Concert in Leipzig in 2006. She wrote music for a Castlevania arrangement box set, and played live at Castlevania: The Concert in Stockholm in 2010. In 2015, she played with other Japanese composers at the Game Sound Maniax concert in China.

== Musical style and influences ==
Game Developer magazine called Yamane's music "old, gothic, Victorian style". Yamane feels she grew an interest in dark classical through her Bach studies in college. She has also drawn inspiration from other composers including Mozart, Beethoven, Ravel, Debussy, Rachmaninoff, and Chopin. In high school, Yamane listened to Kraftwerk, Ryuichi Sakamoto, and Yellow Magic Orchestra (YMO), with the latter being considered a major influence on many Japanese game composers. She has also drawn inspiration, and enjoys listening to Dream Theater. She has expressed inspiration from many genres including techno pop, progressive rock, film scores, folk, jazz, rock, bossa nova, and contemporary classical music. She enjoys film scores by composers such as Jerry Goldsmith, and enjoyed American pop in her youth from artists like Barry Manilow, Burt Bacharach, Eric Carmen, The Doobie Brothers, and The Eagles.

Yamane has expressed enjoying music from other game composers, particularly Nobuo Uematsu, Hitoshi Sakimoto, Yoko Kanno, and Motoi Sakuraba. She also explained that Tomb Raider and its sequel influenced the way she thought about sound design.

== Works ==
Yamane contributed music to over 40 games at Konami. As a member of the Konami Kukeiha Club, Yamane frequently collaborated with other composers, arrangers, and sound programmers.

Year	Game	Co-worker(s)
1988	King's Valley II	Music with Kazuhiko Uehara, Masahiro Ikariko, Kinuyo Yamashita, Motoaki Furukawa
1989	Ganbare Goemon 2	Music
1989	Nemesis 3: The Eve of Destruction	Music with Kazuhiko Uehara, Motoaki Furukawa, Yukie Morimoto, Masahiro Ikariko
1990	Nemesis	Music with Tomoya Tomita
1990	Teenage Mutant Ninja Turtles: Fall of the Foot Clan	Music
1991	Detana!! TwinBee	Music with Hidenori Maezawa and Masae Nakashima
1991	Vendetta	Music
1992	Asterix	Music with Mutsuhiko Izumi, Mariko Egawa, Junya Nakano, Ayako Nishigaki
1993	Pop'n TwinBee	Music with Kazuhiko Uehara, Masahiro Ikariko, Hideto Inoue et al.
1993	Rocket Knight Adventures	Music with Masanori Oouchi, Aki Hata, Masanori Adachi, Hiroshi Kobayashi
1994	Sparkster	Music with Masahiro Ikariko, Minako Matsuhira, Akira Yamaoka
1994	Sparkster: Rocket Knight Adventures 2	Music with Akira Yamaoka
1994	Castlevania: Bloodlines	Music
1997	Castlevania: Symphony of the Night	Music
1999	Gungage	Music with Sota Fujimori
2000	Elder Gate	Music
2001	Pro Evolution Soccer	Music with Norikazu Miura
2002	Pro Evolution Soccer 2	Music with Sota Fujimori
2002	Castlevania: Harmony of Dissonance	Music with Soshiro Hokkai
2002	Suikoden III	Music with Takashi Yoshida and Masahiko Kimura
2003	Castlevania: Aria of Sorrow	Music with Takashi Yoshida and Soshiro Hokkai
2003	Castlevania: Lament of Innocence	Music
2004	Suikoden IV	Music with Masahiko Kimura and Norikazu Miura
2005	The Sword of Etheria	Music
2005	Castlevania: Dawn of Sorrow	Music with Masahiko Kimura
2005	Castlevania: Curse of Darkness	Music with Yuka Watanabe
2006	Castlevania: Portrait of Ruin	Music with Yuzo Koshiro
2006	Elebits	Music with Naoyuki Sato
2008	Castlevania: Order of Ecclesia	Music with Yasuhiro Ichihashi
2010	Mushihime-sama Bug Panic	Music with several others
2011	Otomedius Excellent	Music with several others
2012	Skullgirls	Music with Brenton Kossak and Blaine McGurty
2014	Super Smash Bros. for Nintendo 3DS and Wii U	Arrangements with several others
2016	NightCry	Music with Nobuko Toda
2018	Bloodstained: Curse of the Moon	Music with several others
2018	Monster Boy and the Cursed Kingdom	Music with Yuzo Koshiro, Motoi Sakuraba, Keiki Kobayashi, Takeshi Yanagawa
2019	Bloodstained: Ritual of the Night	Music with Keisuke Ito and Ryusuke Fujioka
2019	Arcalast	Music
2023	9 Years of Shadows	Music with Miguel Hasson and Norihiko Hibino
