= Gungage =

1999 video game

- Developer: Konami Computer Entertainment Tokyo
- Publisher: Konami
- Programmer: Shutaro Iida
- Composer: Michiru Yamane
- Platform: PlayStation
- Release: JP: 3 June 1999; EU: 24 September 1999
- Genre: Third-person shooter
- Mode: Single-player

Gungage (ガンゲージ) is a third-person shooter video game for the PlayStation created by Konami. It was released in Japan and Europe in 1999.

The only plot presented at the beginning of the game is "suddenly, at locations everywhere, beasts have begun to appear and attack people".

The game takes place in a "fantasy sci-fi" world reminiscent of Elemental Gearbolt, Space Harrier, and Nausicaä of the Valley of the Wind, and the soundtrack was composed by Sōta Fujimori and Michiru Yamane.

== Characters ==
Gungage features four playable characters.

- Wakle Skade: A young blond man who is the only playable character at the beginning of the game. His handgun has only one primary attack: rapid-firing blue energy bullets. He has two special abilities, both of which are defensive. One is the energy shield and the other is a "stop bullet" that can freeze the enemy for a few seconds.
- Kard Berdish: An ex-officer of the mysterious corporation that seems to be responsible for the monsters. He has white hair, wears a military uniform, and carries a multifunction rifle that includes a laser rifle, flamethrower, homing-missile launcher, and grenade launcher, as well as two devastating special attacks.
- Steyr Harquebus: A dissident fighting against the corporation. She is a small teenage girl with a long-barelled minigun that is taller than she is. She has only one primary attack, but her four special moves more than make up for this shortcoming.
- Dee Van Feng: A cyborg teenage boy with long white hair, created by the corporation. Dee carries a pair of Uzis.

Each of the four characters has a unique story, which mostly involve the same levels as the other characters, but in a different order, and with some elements shuffled around. Only Wakle is playable at the beginning; other characters must be unlocked by performing specific actions with available characters.

== Reception ==
Reception

Review scores
| Publication | Score |
|---|---|
| Consoles + | 88%, 72% |
| Famitsu | 23/40 |
| Hyper | 67/100 |
| Jeuxvideo.com | 13/20 |
| Joypad | 4/10, 3/10 |
| M! Games | 59% |
| Mega Fun | 65/100 |
| Player One | 46% |
| Video Games (DE) | 4/5, 71% |
| Extreme PlayStation | 32% |
| Fun Generation | 6/10 |
| Gamers' Republic | C |
| PlayStation Plus | 55% |
| PlayStation Power | 11% |
| Power Unlimited | 6.3/10 |

Gungage received mixed reviews.
