= Sparkster: Rocket Knight Adventures 2 =

1994 video game

- North American Genesis box art
- Developer: Konami
- Publisher: Konami
- Director: Yasushi Takano
- Producer: Tomikazu Kirita
- Designers: Shiori Satoh; Noboru Shirasu
- Programmers: Shuusa Yaegashi; Masanaka Takahashi; Toshiki Yamamura; Yatsuro Tsurugai
- Artist: Yasushi Takano
- Composers: Akira Yamaoka; Michiru Yamane
- Platform: Sega Genesis
- Release: JP: September 23, 1994; NA: October 1994; EU: November 1994
- Genres: Platformer, scrolling shooter
- Mode: Single-player

Sparkster: Rocket Knight Adventures 2 (Note: Supākusutā Roketto Naito Adobenchāzu 2 (スパークスター ロケットナイトアドベンチャーズ2)) (known simply as Sparkster in North America and Europe), is a 1994 side-scrolling platform game developed and published by Konami for the Sega Genesis. A sequel to Rocket Knight Adventures, the game involves the character named Sparkster attempting to save Princess Cherry and to stop the evil plans of King Gedol, who plans to take over the kingdom of Zephyrus. The game largely follows the same format as its precursor, with changes to the game's mechanics.

Sparkster: Rocket Knight Adventures 2 is the second game in the Rocket Knight Adventures series. Another game under the same title, Sparkster, but without the Rocket Knight Adventures subtitle and not continuing the plot of the first game, was released on the SNES in the same year. A direct sequel, Rocket Knight, was released in 2010.

== Gameplay ==
The gameplay of Sparkster is very similar to its precursor. Sparkster plays as a side-scrolling platformer, with a few areas in the game featuring auto-scrolling levels. Like its predecessor, the player can jump and attack using Sparkster's sword. Unlike the first game, the sword can no longer emit projectiles and can only perform melee attacks. Sparkster's maximum health has been reduced from eight hearts (16 hit points) to five hearts (10 hit points) compared to the first game. Sparkster can find various helpful items in the levels, such as apples and meat (the former restoring all hit points), gems, rocket pack items that automatically make him perform a screw attack when collected, extra lives, and a power-up capsule that increases Sparkster's attack power until he is hit.

Similar to its precursor, pressing the Rocket button will make Sparkster perform a rocketattack where he blasts into one of eight directions where the player has inputted on the directional pad (if no direction is pressed, Sparkster will perform a stationary spinning attack). The use of the rocket pack is changed in Sparkster. Instead of charging up a rocket attack manually, the rocket pack charges automatically. A rocket attack is now performed by pressing its separate Rocket button. The rocket pack charges up to two levels. If the energy gauge is filled red, the player can perform a rocket attack. If the secondary white gauge is filled, Sparkster can perform a "screw attack" which lets him travel a greater distance and can interact with certain level elements such as screws.

A slot machine, new to the game, is displayed on the top right of the screen. When 10 blue gems are collected (or when one red gem is collected), the slot machine will activate and will give items that help Sparkster, or bombs that hurt Sparkster. In harder difficulties, bombs become more common.

Sparkster is composed of six stages, with each stage ending with a boss fight. The introductory sequence begins with a mech battle that can be skipped by pressing Start; though the introductory sequence is necessary to complete in order to achieve the true ending of the game. The introductory sequence of the game and boss fight of the fifth stage involves Sparkster controlling his robot mech, named the "SparkRobo", to battle the mech of Sparkster's arch-rival, Axel Gear. In battle, SparkRobo can throw a direct punch, an uppercut and can block Axel's punches and projectile attacks. By pressing Down, the SparkRobo will charge a more powerful attack. In the fifth stage, the views alternate between the upper view of the SparkRobo and the bottom view, consisting of attacks and jumping respectively.

Across all the stages, there are seven buried swords known as "Keys to the Seal" scattered throughout the levels, which allows Sparkster to transform into a golden form if all of them are collected by the end of the Axel Gear fight of the sixth stage. Five keys are scattered throughout stages of the game, while two keys are collected by defeating Axel in the introductory boss fight and his fight at the final stage. Collecting all seven keys are necessary to achieve the "true" ending of the game. Gold Sparkster can deal more damage and can charge the rocket pack faster, but he is still able to sustain damage.

The game features multiple endings, with extended endings shown the harder the difficulty is. The "true" ending can only be seen if the game difficulty is set to Hard or Very Hard.

== Plot ==
Following the events of the first game, the kingdom of Zephyrus (labelled as Zebulos in the international manuals) returns to a state of peace, until a global threat to Elhorn arises. A tribe of reptiles known as the Gedol Empire, led by King Gedol, emerges across the lands of Elhorn following the tribe's control from the Devontidos Empire, which was destroyed by Sparkster. Seeking to control the kingdom, Gedol recruits and dispatches Sparkster's arch-rival, Axel Gear to kidnap Princess Cherry, the cousin of Princess Sherry - as a way to lure Sparkster to doom.

In a cave, Sparkster is in the search for one of the seven "Keys to the Seal", powerful swords that allow great power to be unleashed. During his search with his mech, the SparkRobo, he is ambushed by Axel and his mech, resulting in a fight between the two. Depending on the outcome, Sparkster defeats Axel and retrieves the first key, otherwise he will be defeated and flee the scene. Later on, during a reunion with princesses Sherry and Cherry, Axel Gear appears and kidnaps Cherry. Sparkster sets off to rescue Cherry by travelling to the Kingdom of Gedol, defeating many troops and winning occasional encounters with Axel. Eventually making it to Gedol's Castle, Sparkster confronts and defeats Axel Gear for the final time, with Axel leaving the last "Key to the Seal" behind. If all Keys have been collected, Sparkster transforms into Gold Sparkster and sets off to confront Gedol. If not, Sparkster sets off normally. Sparkster eventually confronts King Gedol and defeats him. If played on the Normal difficulty or harder, Gedol transforms into a giant, using his eyes as lasers. Sparkster eventually defeats him and slices him in half.

Sparkster rescues Cherry and escapes the exploding castle. If the game is finished on the Hard difficulty, Sparkster returns to the kingdom of Zephyrus, reuniting Cherry with the King and Sherry. With his job done, Sparkster flies elsewhere. If the player has achieved Sparkster's gold form, Sparkster returns to the location where he found the first key and returns it back into its place, reverting to his normal state in the process.

== Reception ==
Reception

Review scores
Publication	Score
AllGame	4.5/5
Famitsu	8/10, 7/10, 8/10, 8/10

While not as acclaimed as the first game, Sparkster did receive a positive reception. Electronic Gaming Monthly commented that some of the attacks "take some getting used to" and that the game needs more colors, but that the sound effects are fitting and the look is an improvement over the original Rocket Knight Adventures. They summarized it as "overall a good action title" and gave it a 7.2 out of 10. While they criticized the severe slowdown in the later levels, GamePro concluded that the game is "a good progression from the original", applauding the special attacks, smooth graphics and animation, and the fact that the harder difficulty levels actually include new sections in the stages instead of just adding more enemies.

Allgame gave the game a score of 4.5 stars out of a possible 5, stating: "If you're in the mood for some high flying hijinks, and love action-platform games, give this Rocket Knight a whirl. You won't be disappointed".

== Legacy ==
A Sparkster comic based on the game was written by Nigel Kitching and drawn by Keith Page in the UK-made Sonic the Comic. In an interview, Kitching said that Sparkster was the easiest game to adapt into a story, due to it being similar to the Sonic the Hedgehog games. He was working on a second Sparkster story, but the plan was dropped when Fleetway was unable to obtain permission from Konami to use the character.

The 2010 revival of the series, Rocket Knight, takes place 15 years after the events of this game.
