= IFuturelist =

Studio album by Akira Yamaoka
- Released: January 13, 2006
- Genre: Electronic; trip hop
- Length: 67:16
- Label: Konami

IFuturelist (stylized as iFUTURELIST and pronounced "I, futurist") is the first original album by Japanese game designer Akira Yamaoka, well known for his work on the Silent Hill and Bemani series. The tone of the album is decidedly electronic, tending more towards his work in the Bemani series, although there are a few songs similar to those found in the Silent Hill series. It also includes a number of long and remixed versions of his work on the beatmaniaIIDX, and pop'n music series of games.

== Track listing ==
1. The policy of the iFUTURELIST Party – 0:58
2. LOVE ME DO – 3:58
3. iFUTURELIST – 3:14
4. tant pis pour toi (Too Bad For You) – 3:21
5. INJECTION OF LOVE – 4:18
6. EMPTY OF THE SKY – 4:10
7. Maria – 3:36
8. Adjust Rain – 4:57
9. RISLIM – 2:44
10. 狂った季節 (Mad Season | Kurutta Kisetsu) – 5:47
11. ライオンはともだち (Lions are Friends | Raion Wa Tomodachi) – 2:32
12. ライオン好き (Lions Like | Raion Suki) – 3:45
13. bitmania – 3:46
14. エイプリルフールの唄 (April Fool Song | Eipuriru Fūru No Uta) – 5:11
15. Heavenly Sun – 7:22
16. 昭和企業戦士荒山課長 (Showa-Era Corporate Warrior Section Chief Arayama | Shōwa Kigyō Senshi Arayama Kachō) -Lolita On Breaks Mix- – 6:57
17. SYSTEM LOVE 7.5.5 – 4:00
