= The Sword of Etheria =

2005 video game

- European version cover art
- Developer: Konami Computer Entertainment Tokyo
- Publisher: Konami
- Director: Junichi Murakami
- Producer: Junichi Murakami
- Designer: Hiroaki Sonobe
- Artist: Fumi Ishikawa
- Writer: Kazuyoshi Tsugawa
- Composer: Michiru Yamane
- Engine: RenderWare
- Platform: PlayStation 2
- Release: JP: June 30, 2005; EU: February 24, 2006
- Genres: Action role-playing, hack and slash
- Mode: Single-player

The Sword of Etheria (Note: Known in Japan as OZ) is an action role-playing game developed and published by Konami Computer Entertainment Tokyo. It was originally released on June 30, 2005, for PlayStation 2 as OZ (オズ, Ozu) (Over Zenith) in Japan, and as Chains of Power in Korea, followed by its release in Europe on February 24, 2006. The game was not released in North America. It was reprinted in Japan on January 26, 2006, as part of the "Konami the Best" budget label.

== Plot ==
=== Setting ===
The Sword of Etheria is set in an alternate world where humans, gods, and spiritual beings known as "Katenas" coexist. Katenas are powerful warriors with the ability to encase themselves in full suits of armor called "Lexes". The Katenas are the envoys of the gods. The three great Katenas, chosen by the gods, are collectively referred to as "Oz".

Both humans and Katenas are overseen by the gods. As in Greek mythology, the gods are described as omnipotent, ambitious, self-serving, and power-hungry. The major source of their power is light; as they consume light, they cast parts of the world into darkness for centuries. The gods seek to destroy humanity and drain the planet's energy source, "Etheria".

=== Story ===
The story begins with three Katenas—Cain, Leon, and Almira—on a mission to investigate a physical manifestation of Etheria on the earth's surface. As they approach the apex of their mission, Almira and Leon lose control of their armor, forcing Cain to proceed alone. Cain then vanishes.

The game shifts forward fifteen years later to Fiel ("Feel" in the Japanese version), a boy who lived with his younger sister, Dorothy, and their cat, Toto. Their village is attacked by monsters called "Volo" and a group of Katenas. Dorothy is kidnapped during the attack. Fiel manages to recruit the aid of Almira and Leon, and together, they head out to rescue Dorothy. During their journey, they constantly face danger and obstacles under the eyes of the gods.

=== Characters ===
The story revolves around three main characters:

- Fiel: the main male protagonist, who carries a large, powerful axe
- Almira: a female Katena with a spear
- Leon: a male Katena with a large claw on his left arm

Their mission is to save Fiel's sister, Dorothy, who was kidnapped by monsters. Dorothy's cat, Toto, has the ability to transform into a Lex, becoming the source of Fiel's Katena-like powers.

Throughout the game, the protagonists fight three other Katenas–Vitis, Galumn, and Juju–who are under the influence and control of the gods.

== Gameplay ==
Typical enemy encounter showing Fiel partnered with Leon and Almira (not shown in the screen).

The Sword of Etheria is presented in a third-person perspective, with players controlling the actions of the main character, Fiel, such as interaction with objects and people. Players control Fiel during the battle while Almira and Leon are AI-controlled. The three characters fight in various surroundings including forests, villages, and dungeons. Each character is assigned a health gauge. If a character's health is reduced to zero, he or she will be incapacitated and forced to recover before returning to the battle. Drawing inspiration from the beat 'em up genre, the game's combat style revolves around performing combos on enemies. Enemies can be launched into the air to perform juggle combos, and players can accept aid from their partners for additional hits.

Fiel performing a Deathblow. A decreased tension gauge is shown on the right.

The game also features a "tension gauge" on the right side of the screen. This gauge indicates the player's performance level with combos. The gauge increases when aerial combos are chained and decreases as the player's momentum falls. When the gauge is full, the player will have the ability to perform a powerful "deathblow" attack, combining the party's force to deal extensive damage to the enemies. The level of the gauge increases as the game proceeds, allowing the player to use more powerful attacks. At its highest level, a filled gauge displays the text "Over Zenith," signifying that the strongest deathblow can be performed.

The Sword of Etheria's storyline is divided into chapters, and each chapter features multiple possible endings depending on a player's actions. For example, an alternate version of the game's ninth chapter features the three main characters portrayed as characters from The Wonderful Wizard of Oz, with Fiel as the Tin Man, Almira as the Scarecrow and Leon as the Lion. There is also an additional unlockable story in which Dorothy is playable as the main character.

The game also features an option of costume change for the characters. These costumes can be purchased during the gameplay and they resemble costumes from various Konami games, including Suikoden III, Castlevania: Lament of Innocence, and Silent Hill 3.

== Development ==
Many members of The Sword of Etheria development team also worked on the Castlevania and Suikoden series. The director and producer, Junichi Murakami, directed Castlevania: Aria of Sorrow, while the composer, Michiru Yamane, worked on the music. Fumi Ishikawa designed characters for Suikoden II.

The Sword of Etheria's music was composed by Yamane and arranged by Naoto Suzuki. The game's soundtrack was commercially released in a two-disc format on July 20, 2005, in Japan. The soundtrack features an arranged version of the song "Polovtsian Dances", played during the opening sequence of the game, performed by Martha Matsuda. A remixed version of the song was featured in another Konami game, Dance Dance Revolution Extreme 2, along with footage from The Sword of Etheria.

== Reception ==
Reception

Review scores
Publication	Score
Eurogamer	6/10
Famitsu	31/40
PALGN	5/10

The game was well received in Japan, receiving a 31/40 score in the Famitsu magazine. However, The Sword of Etheria received more mediocre reception upon its release in Europe, as Eurogamer's Simon Parkin called the translation of the European release "disastrous" but praised the combat as extremely rewarding although repetitive. PALGN's Jeremy Jastrzab commended the use of the game's music as a stylish and the unconventional presentation but made a note on the poor graphics environments, saying that players are usually surrounded by either dull corridors or barren landscapes.
