= Asura's Wrath =

2012 video game

- Developer: CyberConnect2
- Publisher: Capcom
- Director: Seiji Shimoda
- Producer: Kazuhiro Tsuchiya
- Artists: Koki Yamaguchi; Yusuke Tokitsu
- Writers: Kei Shigema; Yasuhiro Noguchi; Seiji Shimoda; Tomohiro Takeda; Shinsaku Sawamura
- Composer: Chikayo Fukuda
- Engine: Unreal Engine 3
- Platforms: PlayStation 3; Xbox 360
- Release: NA: February 21, 2012; AU/JP: February 23, 2012; EU: February 24, 2012; UK: March 9, 2012
- Genres: Action, beat 'em up, rail shooter
- Mode: Single-player

Asura's Wrath (Note: Japanese: アスラズ ラース, Hepburn: Asurazu Rāsu) is a 2012 action video game developed by CyberConnect2 and published by Capcom for the PlayStation 3 and Xbox 360. Taking elements from Hindu and Buddhist mythologies and blending them with science fiction, the game follows the titular character, the demigod Asura, as he seeks revenge on the pantheon of other demigods who betrayed him.

The story is presented in the style and format of an episodic series of cinematic scenes, including opening and closing credits, with the gameplay shifting between third-person combat, a rail shooter, and interactive sequences with player input in the form of quick-time event button prompts. Because of its unique style, the game has been described in the media as an "interactive anime".

The game was received positively by critics, with many praising the story, but received mixed responses towards the gameplay and "interactive anime" style.

== Gameplay ==
Asura (right) attack Augus with repeated punches. The player is prompted to press the B button in order to increase and maintain their burst gauge, represented as the slowly filling red bar at the top (Xbox 360 version).

Asura's Wrath is a mix of multiple genres, overall presented in the style of an episodic anime series. The gameplay constantly shifts from third-person beat 'em up combat, a rail shooter, and interactive cutscenes with various quick time event (QTE) and context sensitive button prompts presented in the form of cinematic events. In all forms of gameplay, player progress is determined by two gauges displayed at the HUD on top of the screen, the life and burst gauge. The life gauge determines the player's current health that if depleted results in a game over/restart screen for that current section. The burst gauge starts empty at the start of every encounter that needs to be fully charged via successfully defeat enemies, inflicting large amounts of damage and successfully carry out QTE prompts. Once filled, players can unleash a powerful burst attack required to finish off strong opponents and advance the plot/gameplay or commence another cutscene. An additional gauge, known as the unlimited gauge, fills up in a similar way to the burst gauge but instead can be activated to temporarily increase the damage that can be inflicted on opponents.

The third-person action sequences resemble "beat 'em up" style gameplay where the player must defeat enemies in close combat, utilizing light and heavy attacks, counters, dashes, and projectiles. While regular light attacks are fast, heavier attacks inflict more damage and can throw back multiple enemies yet can overheat requiring a cool-down period between uses. Players can also perform counter moves if they input the current prompt during an enemy's attack. When an enemy is knocked down, special moves can be performed that further help fills the burst gauge. If however the player character is knocked back, they have a chance to quickly recover by landing on their feet and saving additional health. The rail shooter portion of the gameplay involves the player character moving yet on a fixed axis, being only able to move to dodge and maneuver against incoming attack and obstacles, all the while locking on and firing upon enemies.

The interactive cutscene element is integrated with the gameplay, however. Correct inputs when prompted will advance the story while failure can cause the restart of a sequence and damage to health in a previous gameplay sequence. While a few sequences may continue regardless, certain quick-time events have degrees of success where the player may attempt to press at an even more specific time than when the prompt immediately and initially appears. For example, a press too early or later might register a merely "good" or "great" while the exact correct moment will register as "excellent". The player's performance in this aspect, along with the time taken to complete and overall damage inflicted is graded at the end of each episode, with the highest grade being an "S Rank". At least 5 S Ranks or completing 50 episodes unlock the final hidden "true ending" of the game.

=== Presentation ===
Each level is played out like an episode more akin to an anime television series, with subtle introductory and closing credits at the start and end of each episode. This is then followed by a brief promo with cut together footage for the next episode, along with a narration recapping and foreshadowing upcoming events. In between episodes, there are also snippets of additional narrative and back story that are presented in the form of a series of illustrations, with each different segment drawn by a different credited artist. The entire "series" is split into four chapters, each cutscene is overlaid with lengthier production credits.

== Synopsis ==
Asura is one of the Eight Guardian Generals, techno-divine beings engaged in an eternal war with the Gohma and their creator, Vlitra, the hostile spirit of their planet, Gaea, where humans reside and offer worship, thereby empowering them and their Karma Fortress with an energy known as "Mantra". Vlitra is temporarily driven back, but the Guardian General's leader, Deus, is concerned about its return. Seeking greater power to fight the Gohma and achieve true immortality, the seven Guardian Generals, including Asura's brother-in-law Yasha, plan to use Asura's priestess daughter Mithra's ability to amplify vast quantities of Mantra. To ensure no interference with their plans, they kill Asura's wife Durga, frame Asura for the death of their emperor, before Deus kills Asura when he tries to rescue Mithra. Encouraged by a Golden Spider, Asura escapes into the living world after 12,000 years, finding the Guardian Generals have now dubbed themselves the Seven Deities and slaughter humans to gather Mantra quickly. Swearing revenge on the Seven Deities, Asura goes after and kills each of them, using his rage to overcome death multiple times.

Asura's rage ultimately consumes him, turning him into a mindless demon. When Deus's second-in-command, Olga, attempts to use the Karma Fortress to kill Asura's enraged form, Yasha defects, seeing this as a misuse of human lives and Mithra's suffering. After crippling the Karma Fortress, Yasha restores Asura to himself, and the two join forces to kill Deus and free Mithra. Vlitra awakens as they achieve this, and with Mithra channeling the stored Mantra into them, Asura and Yasha successfully destroy Vlitra's core, destroying the Gohma for good. An enraged Olga attempts to kill Mithra, but the Golden Spider appears and kills her before possessing Mithra in order to manifest his true body. It reveals its true identity as Chakravartin, the creator of the universe, who bestowed the Mantra upon humanity's ancestors and orchestrated every action of the conflict with the Gohma to find a worthy god to rule Gaea, selecting Asura for this role after he killed Vlitra in the final test.

Asura, realizing Chakravartin is the reason for his and everyone's suffering, refuses and attacks Chakravartin. Still, Mithra, seeing how his body is breaking down due to the power of his wrath, banishes Asura away while entrusting him to Yasha. Declaring Asura to be a failure, Chakravartin destroys the Karma Fortress and prepares to destroy the world and start again. Yasha installs the Karma Fortress's Mantra Reactor into Asura in order to let him safely channel both his wrath and the Mantras of the Seven Deities, then sacrifices his own heart to empower Asura. Using this power, Asura stops Chakravartin's destruction of the world and, becoming a Deity, breaks through into Chakravartin's realm to rescue his daughter. Chakravartin is impressed by his power and gives him back Mithra while declaring Asura the new god of Gaea, allowing Chakravartin to leave and guide other worlds.

Asura once again refuses, appalled by Chakravartin's manipulation of the world, and fights him. Although Chakravartin's true power destroys the power Asura gains from the Mantra Reactor, Asura's anger at Chakravartin for his actions and Mithra's suffering is so great that he is able to kill him using only the power of his wrath. Killing Chakravartin removes Mantra from the universe, which kills Asura, as Mantra fuels him. His rage dissipated, Asura bids farewell to Mithra as he vanishes to reunite with Durga in the afterlife, and Mithra is returned to Gaea.

The final scene shows Mithra telling the story of Asura to humans, with an epilogue taking place millions of years later in the modern day, with Asura, his family, and the Seven Deities having reincarnated as humans, until a giant meteor appears in the sky to crash into the city, prompting the reincarnated Asura to fight once again.

== Development ==
Asura's Wrath began development in 2007. The development team wanted to create a game that everyone could understand. In an interview, Hiroshi Matsuyama commented on the principles behind the game's creation: "Our main concept was that we wanted to reach out to audiences all over the world with Asura's Wrath. That's why we focused on wrath as our main concept. It's something that anybody can relate to. It's an emotion that's very powerful. It's sometimes seen as negative, but it can be a driving force that helps you overcome any obstacle. When we came up with this backward approach to the development process, first we thought of our focus on wrath, then focused on the story, so we built the story first. Who wrote the story? CyberConnect 2 did, as a group. It was a group effort throughout the dev team, but when we had the story, we passed that on to an actual scriptwriter." In a different interview with Eurogamer, he stated that he was pleased by the site's impression of the game as "completely deranged" and went further into the game's core theme: "In Japanese entertainment and comics, and in games as well, there are many interesting depictions of wrath already – things like Dragon Ball and Naruto – and we love those kinds of comics and games. So we thought, what can we do if we really, really focus on that? How interesting can we make it? That was our challenge to ourselves." The hot spring scene, a very traditional scene for manga and anime in Japanese culture according to Matsuyama, was deliberately placed as a change of pace and a chance for Asura to show a different face to players.

The game was developed on the Unreal Engine 3, which was specially licensed by Capcom for the task, and aided significantly in the development of the game. In an interview, Kazuhiro Tsuchiya stated that "We tried a lot of different options and determined that Unreal Engine 3 was a perfect solution. Our developers were able to review the game in real time, and they continue to be productive throughout the process." The titular character, Asura, was voiced by Hiroki Yasumoto and Liam O'Brien in Japanese and English, respectively. Asura's Wrath was first announced during the Tokyo Game Show in September 2010. The announcement trailer showed the title character battle multiple foes before being confronted by a planetary sized enemy. The trailer showed an earlier build that differed from the finished product in multiple aspects. While the character designs and Asian-style art design were similar, even identical in certain regards, the tone and combat was more violent and bloody, showing a greater emphasis on the combat mechanics rather the interactive cinematic features. Following its reveal, Tsuchiya revealed that he felt the game would serve to satisfy fans wanting a sequel to the 2006 PlayStation 2 game God Hand, which was lauded by critics, but failed commercially. He was later pleased that people had seen the deliberate similarities between the two games. A playable demo was released on Xbox Live and PlayStation Network on January 10, 2012.

=== Downloadable content ===
Downloadable content includes a two-dimensional fighting mode using the Super Street Fighter IV mechanics, as well as two characters from the game, Ryu/Evil Ryu and Akuma/Oni as opponents, with voices only available in Japanese. Also, "untold" chapters are included and use hand-drawn animation by Studio 4°C with quick time events, mostly to fill gaps between the game's chapters. The DLC also allows players to play and see the 'real' ending of the game which is not available from the disc.

== Soundtrack ==
Asura's Wrath: The Official Soundtrack

Soundtrack album by Chikayo Fukuda
- Released: March 7, 2012 (Japan)
- Length: 130:27 (Two CDs)
- Label: Suleputer

The game's original soundtrack is scored by Chikayo Fukuda, and was released on March 7, 2012. A track listing has been provided in Japanese. In addition to the lead recording artist, other composers and pieces of music outside of development were involved. Chikayo Fukuda composed the main theme and its variation, entitled "In Your Belief" while the vocalized version was sung by Tomoyo Mitani. The game also features Antonín Dvořák's Symphony No. 9 in E Minor From the New World in the set piece battle between Asura and Augus on the moon.

== Reception ==
Reception

Aggregate score
Aggregator	Score	
Aggregator	PS3	Xbox 360
Metacritic	71/100	71/100

Review scores
Publication	Score	
Publication	PS3	Xbox 360
Destructoid	N/A	5/10
Edge	5/10	N/A
Eurogamer	N/A	8/10
Famitsu	38/40	34/40
Game Informer	8.5/10	8.5/10
GameSpot	5.5/10	5.5/10
GameTrailers	N/A	6.3/10
GameZone	N/A	8/10
Giant Bomb	N/A	4/5
IGN	7.5/10	7.5/10
Joystiq	N/A	4.5/5
Official Xbox Magazine (US)	N/A	7/10
PlayStation: The Official Magazine	7/10	N/A
TeamXbox	N/A	8.5
Digital Spy	4/5	N/A
Metro	7/10	7/10

The game was received positively by the Japanese gaming magazine Famitsu. The magazine gave the game scores of 10, 10, 9, and 9, each out of 10, adding up to a total of 38 out of 40.

When released in the Western market, the game received "average" reviews on both platforms according to the review aggregation website Metacritic. Many critics praised the story and highlighted the "interactive anime" style as a positive, while others felt it detracted from regular gameplay. In a review for G4TV, Alex Rubens in regards to the episodic narratives stated "I found myself anticipating the next episode as if it were my favorite TV show, making me want to jump right back in and play even more", going on to detail that the story "manages to keep from being predictable by the sheer craziness of the twists that [it] takes." TeamXbox praised the overall presentation as "the best adaptation of the Anime episode structure ever in a videogame", that is suited the characters and overarching narrative. Brad Shoemaker of Giant Bomb praised the game's over the top spectacle, in that the "sheer craziness isn't enough; it's also about the way the craziness is presented. The visuals have a tremendous scale, and the action is masterfully framed by someone who really knows how to work a camera angle."

Critical response to the balance between the "interactive anime" style and gameplay was mixed. Jeff Cork of Game Informer commented that "the combat may not be as deep as other hack and slash offerings, but it does a great job of making Asura feel (and play) like the unhinged demigod", in which he felt the story was the focus rather than the combat, finding it "a nice change of pace from other hack-and-slash games, featuring an interesting story that’s not blocked off by insurmountable difficulty." Keza MacDonald of IGN stated that this unique element was "self-evidently, an excellent thing – and a rare one, if you've been playing games for a long time", praising the presentation in particular, in her opinion calling Asura's Wrath "one of the greatest achievements in Japanese animation in a very long time". Despite this, however, she responded negatively to the longevity, concluding that "as an episodic download release Asura's Wrath would be brilliant, but as a premium-priced game it can only be recommended with strong reservations." In a more critical review, Giancarlo Varanini of GameSpot called the reliance on quick-time events "uninspired" and a "distraction", while also being critical of the difficulty of the combat, in a statement saying, "There's no challenge; no enemies that put up an engaging fight. It's all very safe." GameTrailers echoed this view saying that if approached as a game, Asura's Wrath will leave you wanting, but as a piece of multimedia, it's intriguing.

Luciano Howard of The Digital Fix gave the PS3 version nine out of ten and stated, "Its presentation is fabulous, with letterboxing where needed, colourful and bountiful art and animation, a mix of pastel shading and traditional game colouring mixed together plus awesome sound quality and variation, especially when considering the music which stands out, head and shoulders above the effects. The scale of action is spectacular with opponents larger than a planet and stronger than a god." Liam Martin of Digital Spy gave the same console version four stars out of five and said it was "undoubtedly a niche title, and the lack of extended player input will leave some feeling a little short changed. For those with an appreciation of Eastern animation and quirky video games, however, Asura's Wrath is one of the more intriguing releases of this year, not to mention this console generation." David Jenkins of Metro gave both console versions seven out of ten, calling them "A wonderfully imaginative and beautifully presented interactive anime, but one that cannot maintain a regular enough supply of surprises to justify even its short running time."

Adam Larck of 411Mania gave the Xbox 360 version 6.4 out of 10 and stated, "While it may be different from most games, Asura's Wrath shows that games can be more about storytelling than the game, or at least more of a balance than mainly gameplay with a few cut scenes here and there. Given the shortness of the game, it's at least worth a check out on the weekend, if nothing else." Justin Clouse of The Escapist gave the same console version three stars out of five, calling it "a novel idea with some poor implementation. It often feels strained into too many directions, but there is something undeniably fun about certain outrageous moments. There really isn't much else quite like Asura's Wrath." Russ Fischer of The A.V. Club gave the PS3 version a C+ and said that it "plays like a tale designed to be experienced in one go. Still, Asura's glowing weak spot is utterly prosaic: price. At $10 or even $20, this could be approached as a diverting experiment. At $60, it's an elixir for only the most obsessive fans of anime storytelling and unusual game design."
