= Castlevania: Curse of Darkness =

2005 video game

- North American cover art
- Developer: Konami
- Publisher: Konami
- Director: Takashi Takeda
- Producer: Koji Igarashi
- Programmer: Shuichi Hirohara
- Artist: Ayami Kojima
- Writer: Koji Igarashi
- Composers: Michiru Yamane; Yuka Watanabe
- Series: Castlevania
- Platforms: PlayStation 2, Xbox
- Release: NA: November 1, 2005; JP: November 24, 2005 (Note: In the region, it was exclusively released for the PlayStation 2.); EU: February 17, 2006
- Genres: Action role-playing, hack and slash
- Mode: Single-player

Castlevania: Curse of Darkness (Note: Known in Japan as Akumajō Dracula: Yami no Juin (悪魔城ドラキュラ 闇の呪印, Akumajō Dorakyura Yami no Juin; Demon Castle Dracula: Curse of Darkness)) is a 2005 action role-playing game developed and published by Konami for the PlayStation 2 and Xbox. It is the fourth 3D title in the Castlevania series, following Castlevania: Lament of Innocence (2003). The game received mixed-to-positive reviews from journalists, with praise for its combat system, mechanics, and music, though many criticized its repetitive level design.

== Gameplay ==
Hector commanding an innocent devil to fire a volley of projectiles at a group of the undead. The interface at the bottom left hand corner shows what commands can be used.

Curse of Darkness is a 3D action role-playing game with elements of hack-and-slash. The game differs from its predecessor, Lament of Innocence, in a number of ways. It includes a more complex, action-adventure style of gameplay, much like Symphony of the Night and Aria of Sorrow. Hector is not a member of the Belmont clan, so he does not use the "Vampire Killer" whip; instead he has the ability to equip a variety of different weapons ranging from swords (both one handed and two handed), spears, axes (also both one handed and two handed), brass knuckles and an extra type called special weapons (which varies from tonfas to gatling guns). There is an extra gameplay mode after finishing the game that allows players to play as Trevor Belmont, equipped with the "Vampire Killer" and the subweapons which are the knife, axe, holy water, cross, and stopwatch. One button is used for standard combo attacks, and a secondary button is used for stronger "finishing attacks" after a singular standard attack or a combo of standard attacks. As the player acquires progressively stronger weapons throughout the game, the number of standard and finishing attacks the player can perform increases accordingly. Each different weapon type has a different set of combos that can be performed.

Departing from the central hub level layout of Lament of Innocence, wherein the player chooses from a number of distinct stages all accessible from a central hallway, Curse of Darkness features a more complete game world with a complete castle map as in Symphony of the Night. However, the game still uses the same map engine as Lament of Innocence, rather than the square-based grid of 2D Castlevania games. A difference in level design is that much of the game does not take place in Dracula's castle, but rather exploring forests, mountains, temples, aqueducts, ruins, and villages in Europe. The player is aided by Innocent Devils, which are demonic creatures developed by Hector himself through the Devil Forgery skill, in order to defeat enemies and solve puzzles within the game. They level up and evolve together with Hector.

== Plot ==
=== Setting ===
Curse of Darkness is set in the year 1479, three years after the events of Castlevania III: Dracula's Curse. Though defeated by vampire hunter Trevor Belmont, Dracula's curse continues to ravage the European countryside, spreading disease, mob violence, and heresy in its wake. Amidst this devastation is Hector, a Devil Forgemaster who had formerly worked under the employ of Dracula but betrayed him sometime during the events of Castlevania III. Eventually growing disgusted with Dracula's brutal methods, Hector leaves Dracula's castle and relinquishes his powers to live amongst humans, settling down to live a peaceful life. When Hector's fiancée Rosaly is accused of witchcraft and burned at the stake, Hector learns that her murder was directed by his rivalrous Devil Forgemaster, Isaac. Seeking revenge, Hector chases his former colleague back to his old home, and back to the demonic life he believed he had left behind him.

=== Story ===
When the game begins, Hector arrives at an Abandoned Castle to confront Isaac. The latter scoffs at his desire for revenge and dares him to regain his powers so they can settle their score in a satisfying way. Hector reluctantly accepts the challenge, and starts hunting his former friend across the Transylvanian countryside. During his quest, he encounters several people: Julia Laforeze, a young witch in exile who turns out to be Isaac's sister; Trevor Belmont, who distrusts him for being a Devil Forgemaster; Zead, a kindly holyman who provides him with reliable information about Isaac's whereabouts; and St. Germain, a mysterious time traveler who presses him to abandon his quest, but eventually leaves him alone with some cryptic comments about a "new destiny" having emerged for him.

At one point, Trevor decides to trust Hector, and uses his own blood to unlock a parallel world called the Infinite Corridor, where Isaac is supposedly hiding. However, when Hector fights a Dullahan there, an evil glyph channels his energy and uses it to summon a new incarnation of Dracula's castle. Isaac, who intended this all along, cruelly stabs Trevor and leaves him for dead.

Hector enters the new Castlevania, where he fights and defeats his nemesis. As he prepares to kill him in a fit of rage, he suddenly remembers Julia, who had warned him not to let the Curse take hold of him. Horrified, Hector realizes that his actions are being controlled by Dracula's curse. A triumphant Zead appears and confirms this, explaining that the Devil Forgemasters were supposed to fight to the death, with the blood-stained Hector becoming the vessel for the Count's reincarnation. Having secured Isaac's body for this purpose, he reveals himself to be Death and attacks, in vain. Hector proceeds to fight Dracula, who is unable to take full control of Isaac's body and returns to the afterlife. Hector then uses his powers as a Devil Forgemaster to lift the curse. Julia comes to his rescue, and they start a new life together. Meanwhile, St. Germain departs for the distant future, wondering how the struggle between mankind and Dracula will end.

== Development ==
Curse of Darkness was produced by Koji Igarashi, who has worked on several other games in the Castlevania series, including Castlevania: Symphony of the Night, Castlevania: Aria of Sorrow and Castlevania: Lament of Innocence. Also returning are series artist Ayami Kojima and composer Michiru Yamane.

=== Audio ===
Michiru Yamane once again composed the music, and worked together with British singer Russell Watson to create the end credits theme "True To Your Dreams". Guitars, which were omitted from Lament of Innocence's score, returned in Curse of Darkness. There was a sampler given away as a bonus to anyone who pre-ordered a copy of Castlevania: Curse of Darkness from supporting retailers.

Animaze has done the English language voicework for the characters.

== Reception ==
Reception

Aggregate scores
Aggregator	Score
GameRankings	72.48%
Metacritic	74/100

Review scores
Publication	Score
1Up.com	7.5/10
Famitsu	32/40
GamePro	4/5
GameSpot	6.8/10
GameTrailers	7.9/10
GameZone	7.8/10
IGN	7.8/10
Play	9/10
TeamXbox	7.6/10
X-Play	3/5
Hardcore Gamer	4.5/5
RPGFan	82/100

Award
Publication	Award
IGN	Editors' Choice

Review aggregator Metacritic shows an averaged score of 74 out of 100, indicating "mixed or average" reviews. The game generated mid to high review scores. Common praises often go to the game's battle system – which as stated by IGN "...can offer up a fairly wide variety of skirmishes and strategies..." -, the Innocent Devil system and musical score. Common criticisms of the game go to the game's environments, which have generally been considered dull and repetitive. X-Play gave Curse of Darkness a 3 out of 5 while IGN gave it a 7.8, or "Good" rating. GamePro gave the game a 4.0 out of a 5.0 fun factor, stating that it was a game that got more intriguing as it goes on. GameSpot rated it 6.8, saying it looked good and had solid controls, but the level design was "monotonous". Game Informer's Tim Turi felt that it was "decent" but did not feel like it captured the "overall style and atmosphere" of other Castlevania games.

== In other media ==
Adapted and illustrated by Kou Sasakura, a two-volume manga adaptation titled Castlevania: Curse of Darkness (悪魔城ドラキュラ 闇の呪印, Akumajō Dorakyura: Yami no Juin) was published in Japan from 2005 to 2006. Taking place between the events of Castlevania III: Dracula's Curse and Castlevania: Curse of Darkness, the manga centers on Isaac and Hector. Tokyopop licensed it for English-language release in North America. The first volume, (ISBN 978-1-4278-0053-4), was released September 1, 2008, and the second, (ISBN 978-1-4278-0214-9), was published January 1, 2009. It is also licensed in France by Soleil Manga.

The manga was positively received by English-language readers. The first volume ranked 72nd on the list of the top 100 best-selling graphic novels in September 2008 with an estimated 1,564 copies sold. In December 2008, the second volume placed 171st on the list of the top 300 best-selling graphic novels with an estimated 720 copies sold. However, it received mixed reviews from English-language critics—two of whom were fans of the Castlevania franchise. Criticism focused on Sasakura's artwork which tended to focus on close-ups and neglect the backgrounds, and the lack of fleshed-out characters. Mania Entertainment's Nadia Oxford disliked having a child as one of the main characters, calling it "unnecessary pandering to a younger audience" and concluding that "It's disappointing to see Castlevania thrown to a kid like so many other great properties." Conversely, another reviewer described it as "a fairly well done vampire comic book" with a "pitch perfect mood" and pleasant artwork, and About.com's Deb Aoki ranked it fifteenth on her list of the twenty-two best vampire manga.

Hector and Isaac were introduced in the second season of the Castlevania animated television series as recurring characters (with the latter being vastly different in terms of character design compared to the game). In the subsequent season, a loose adaption of Saint Germain was added to the cast as well. The events of Curse of Darkness were loosely adapted in the form of a few events, such as Death disgusing himself to trick someone into bringing Dracula back, and the concept of the Infinite Corridor.
