= Shigenobu Nakamura =

Japanese composer and music teacher

Shigenobu Nakamura (中村 滋延, Nakamura Shigenobu), born in Osaka in 1950, is a Japanese composer and music teacher. He teaches at Kyushu University (Faculty of Design). He has written fifteen books and done both chamber music and symphonies. In the 1990s his visual works were performed at festivals in Palermo and Germany.

== Links ==
- Personal Website
