= Sparkster =

1994 video game

- North American box art
- Developer: Konami
- Publisher: Konami
- Director: Hideo Ueda
- Designer: Tsunenari Yada
- Programmer: Hideo Ueda
- Composers: Kazuhiko Uehara; Masahiro Ikariko; Minako Matsuhira; Michiru Yamane; Akira Yamaoka
- Series: Rocket Knight
- Platform: Super NES
- Release: JP: September 15, 1994; NA: October 1994; EU: 1994
- Genres: Platform, shoot 'em up
- Mode: Single-player

Sparkster (スパークスター, Supākusutā) is a 1994 platform game developed and published by Konami for the Super Nintendo Entertainment System. It is the only game in the Rocket Knight series to be released on a Nintendo console, and was directed by Hideo Ueda. Sparkster is a sequel to the original Rocket Knight Adventures for the Sega Genesis, though it is a different game than the similarly titled Genesis sequel, Sparkster: Rocket Knight Adventures 2.

== Gameplay ==
Sparkster

Total! described Sparkster as a "platform blaster". The eponymous main character is Sparkster, an opossum knight who fights an army of yellow wolves and robots. He is armed with a sword that can fire energy bolts and a rocket pack that allows him to fly short distances. The gameplay remains mostly the same as in Mega Drive/Genesis games, with the most notable change being the addition of a short-distance rolling dash. At the end of every level, Sparkster battles a boss, and the level is complete when it is defeated. The third (second in Easy) stage consists of Sparkster riding a robot-ostrich in an auto-scrolling level, while the seventh (fifth in Easy) consists of a top-down shooter level. One major difference is that the game's final level depends on the difficulty the player selected. On easy, the game culminates with battle against Axel Gear, but on normal, the story continues with Sparkster fighting the leader of the Wolves on the next level. On hard difficulty, the game continues beyond that, with the true final stage.

== Plot ==
The kingdom of Eginasem, a land inhabited by opossums, is under attack by the Lioness's army of yellow dog and wolf soldiers, which also kidnapped Princess Flora. Sparkster, the Rocket Knight, is out to battle this threat, rescue the princess and save his kingdom from certain destruction. His nemesis, the rival Rocket Knight Axel Gear, is aiding the invading forces, making Sparkster's task even more dangerous. The player's goal is to battle through all of the enemy warriors and robots, defeat Axel Gear and infiltrate the enemy's battleship, where the yellow dogs leader, Generalissimo Lioness, is planning to launch a warhead to destroy planet Eginasem.

== Reception ==
Reception

Review scores
Publication	Score
Computer and Video Games	88/100
Electronic Gaming Monthly	8/10, 8/10, 8/10, 8/10, 9/10
Famitsu	7/10, 6/10, 7/10, 7/10
Game Players	93%
GameFan	89/100, 88/100, 80/100
Official Nintendo Magazine	91/100
Super Play	89%
Total!	(UK) 84/100 (DE) 2+
Games World	86/100
The Super Famicom	72/100
Super Gamer	83/100
VideoGames	7/10

Sparkster on the SNES received generally favorable reception from critics. GamePro rated the game positively, but mentioned that it was not a strong enough improvement from Rocket Knight Adventures, criticizing the lack of an improved control scheme and new weapons and powerups. However, they praised the impressive graphics, moody music and the two secret hard modes. Electronic Gaming Monthly gave it an 8.2 out of ten, saying that it shows Konami "back to form" with "huge levels, gigantic bosses, outstanding graphics and excellent music".

Sparkster was awarded Best Sound Effects of 1994 by Electronic Gaming Monthly. IGN ranked the game 87th in their list of the "Top 100 SNES Games of All Time". In 1995, Total! listed the game 74th in its list of the "Top 100 SNES Games", writing: "Konami come up trumps again with this gorgeous looking platform blaster. A huge challenge too".
