= Olympus scandal =

Japanese accounting fraud, exposed in 2011

- Key players: Olympus Corporation: Michael Christopher Woodford, Tsuyoshi Kikukawa, Hisashi Mori, Hideo Yamada; Intermediaries: Hajime Sagawa, Akio Nakagawa, Nobumasa Yokoo; Auditors: KPMG, Ernst & Young
- Suspicious acquisitions: ITX (2003), Altis, Humalabo and News Chef (2005–2008), Gyrus Group (2008)
- Missing assets: ¥376 billion yen ($4.9 billion)
- Whistleblower: ex-CEO Michael Christopher Woodford (later won damages for wrongful dismissal)
- Corporate casualties: Tsuyoshi Kikukawa, Hisashi Mori, Hideo Yamada and others
- Official investigations: Serious Fraud Office, Federal Bureau of Investigation, Financial Services Agency, Tokyo Metropolitan Police, Securities and Exchange Surveillance Commission, Tokyo Stock Exchange

The Olympus scandal was a case of accounting fraud exposed in Japan in 2011 at optical equipment manufacturer Olympus. On 14 October, British-born Michael Christopher Woodford was suddenly ousted as chief executive. He had been company president for six months, and two weeks prior had been promoted to chief executive officer, when he exposed "one of the biggest and longest-running loss-hiding arrangements in Japanese corporate history", according to The Wall Street Journal. Tsuyoshi Kikukawa, the board chairman, who had appointed Woodford to these positions, again assumed the title of CEO and president. The incident raised concern about the endurance of tobashi schemes, and the strength of corporate governance in Japan.

Apparently irregular payments for acquisitions had resulted in very significant asset impairment charges in the company's accounts, and this was exposed in an article in the Japanese financial magazine FACTA and had come to Woodford's attention. Japanese press speculated on a connection to Yakuza (Japanese organised crime syndicates). Olympus defended itself against allegations of impropriety.

Despite Olympus' denials, the matter quickly snowballed into a corporate corruption scandal over concealment (called tobashi) of more than 117.7 billion yen ($1.5 billion) of investment losses and other dubious fees and payments dating back to the late 1980s and suspicion of covert payments to criminal organisations. On 26 October, Kikukawa was replaced by Shuichi Takayama as chairman, president, and CEO. On 8 November 2011, the company admitted that the company's accounting practice was "inappropriate" and that money had been used to cover losses on investments dating to the 1990s. The company blamed the inappropriate accounting on former president Tsuyoshi Kikukawa, auditor Hideo Yamada and executive vice-president Hisashi Mori.

By 2012 the scandal had developed into one of the biggest and longest-lived loss-concealing financial scandals in the history of corporate Japan; it had wiped 75–80% off the company's stock market valuation, led to the resignation of much of the board, and triggered investigations across Japan, the UK and US. Among the people criminally charged in this scandal, only two securities brokers went to prison for 3–4 years. A shareholder derivative suit in 2019 fined three Olympus board members for 59.4 billion yen (US$594 million), the largest of its kind in Japanese history. This scandal also raised considerable turmoil and concern over Japan's prevailing corporate governance and transparency and the Japanese financial markets. Woodford received a reported £10 million ($16 m) in damages from Olympus for defamation and wrongful dismissal in 2012; around the same time, Olympus also announced it would shed 2,700 jobs (7% of its workforce) and around 40 per cent of its 30 manufacturing plants by 2015 to reduce its cost base.

== Background ==
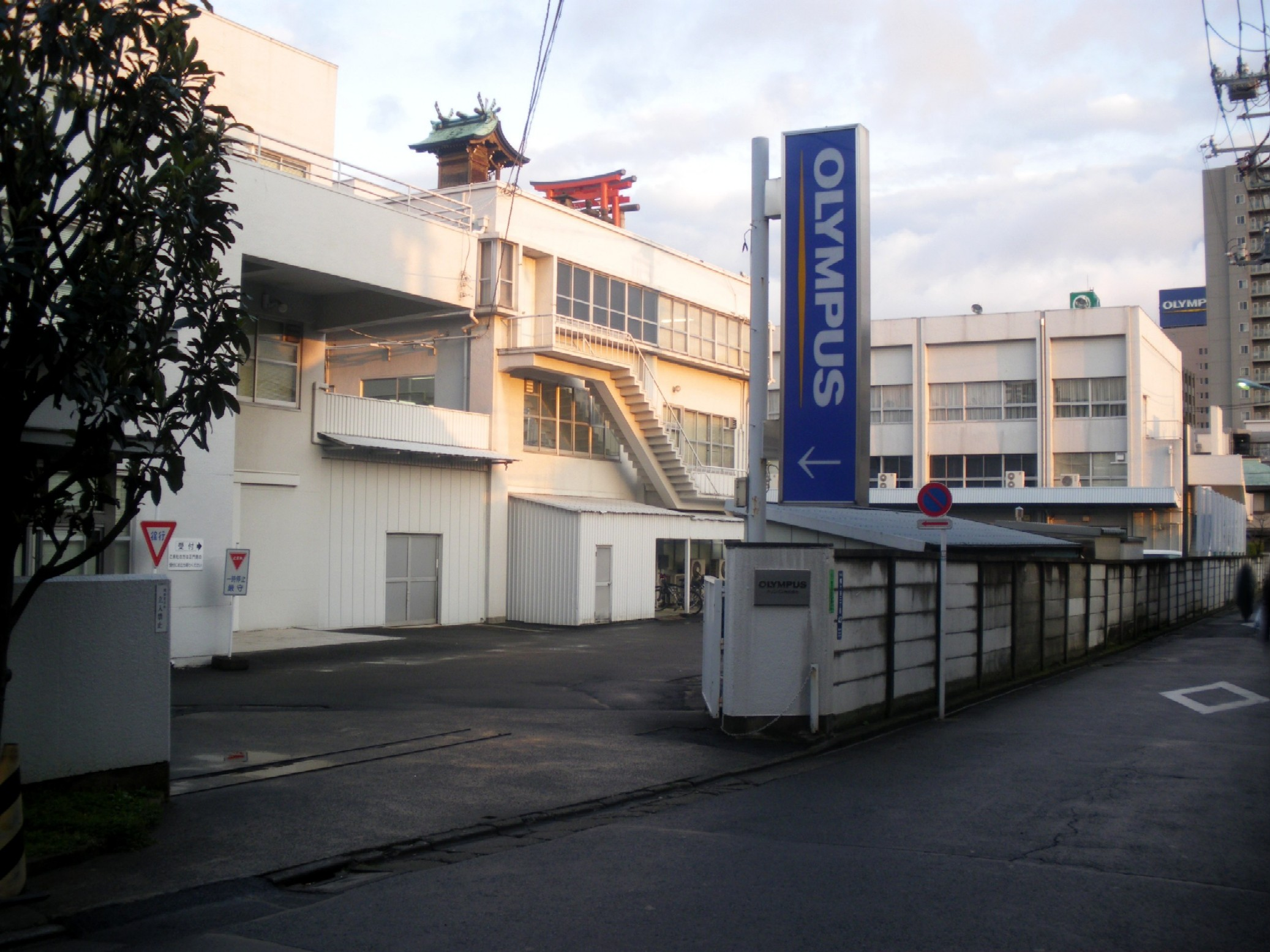
Building at Olympus head office in Tokyo

Olympus Corporation, a major Japanese manufacturer of optical imaging laboratory and medical equipment listed on the Tokyo Stock Exchange had, according to its accounts for the year ended 31 March 2011, consolidated net sales of ¥847.1 billion (US$10.6 billion) in the year, and total shareholders' equity of ¥262.5 billion (US$3.3 billion). The group employs close to 40,000 people around the world. Its assets of ¥1 trillion (US$13.3 billion) as at 31 March 2011 included ¥175.5 billion (US$2.2 billion) of goodwill, an intangible asset. Under the leadership of Tsuyoshi Kikukawa, who became president in 2001, the company's revenues increased from ¥467 billion to ¥847 billion while the profits were a relatively constant ¥35 billion.

During the 1980s, many Japanese corporations relied on investments to bolster dwindling profits, particularly in its exports, which had been eroded by a strong yen. Toshiro Shimoyama, Olympus president from 1984 to 1993, admitted to the Nikkei industrial daily newspaper in 1986: "When the main business is struggling, we need to earn through zaitech" (meaning financial engineering). Olympus invested in financial derivatives and other risky investments to boost profits. However, Shimoyama said he "does not remember" any attempt to conceal losses (tobashi) during his tenure as president: "As president it wasn't the case where all financial reports would come to me, so I have no memory. During that time Masatoshi Kishimoto was the treasurer ... I wouldn't have heard financial details." Kishimoto, Olympus president from 1993 to 2001, in turn denied involvement in concealing losses, and instead suggested possible implication of Hideo Yamada, whom he said he supervised poorly.

In 1991 Olympus had to take losses of ¥2.1 billion on the value of its investments after the investment bonanza ended. In June 1998, Olympus was subject of market rumours that it had suffered sizeable trading losses on derivatives which caused its shares to plunge by 11 per cent. The rumours were emphatically denied by Olympus, which subsequently announced record profits. The company further disclosed during its interim results in October 1999, that it had lost nearly ¥17 billion from interest rate and currency swaps. The company also reported that it had lost ¥2.9 billion in the Princeton Economics International Ponzi scheme. According to Bloomberg, the annual report of Olympus Corporation for the year ended 31 March 2010 showed a ¥15.5 billion ($201 million) prior period adjustment for "loss related to the purchase of preference shares from [an unnamed] third party"; goodwill on its balance sheet also increased by ¥13.5 billion yen to account for the purchase. In September 2011, Olympus announced that it had written off part of a ¥45 billion investment in emerging market bonds. BusinessWeek noted that the ratio of company debt relative to equity ranked Olympus among the top 2 percent most highly geared of Japan's largest companies, while The Financial Times commented that its capital base – an equity ratio in 2011 of below 14 percent – is the weakest among its peer group. Olympus is the only Nikkei 225 constituent whose intangible assets – principally goodwill of around ¥168 billion – exceeds net assets (¥151 billion).

=== External growth ===
Having spent some US$4 billion during this period under the stewardship of Kikukawa, the company's aggressive strategy of external growth was not without criticism. According to an Olympus employee, the acquisitions process and funds movements were under the tight control of a small circle of executives in the "Financial Affairs Group". Japanese business daily is quoted as saying more than a hundred businesses were acquired during Kikukawa's tenure, and that the majority were unlisted and loss-making. The investments were in diverse sectors such as pet care and DVD production, and often had little connection with the core Olympus business. The most significant acquisition was the British medical equipment maker Gyrus Group, acquired in 2008 at a cost of $2 billion – the equivalent of almost 5 times turnover and 27 times EBITDA. In the same year, Olympus also paid out ¥73.5 billion ($965 million) when it acquired three "small venture firms" – Altis, Humalabo, and NewsChef. By contrast, in 2009 Olympus sold the profitable diagnostics unit it had built up over 40 years to Beckman Coulter for $1 billion – approximately two times turnover – to free up capital.

== Exposure of the scandal ==
=== Woodford's background and inquiries ===
British-born Michael Christopher Woodford was an Olympus veteran of 30 years, and previously executive managing director of Olympus Medical Systems Europa. As European Director in 2008, Woodford had noticed the "strange goings-on at the company" such as the Gyrus acquisition, which should have been within his scope but was instead handled from Tokyo. (Woodford had set out to resign over the matter but stayed with Olympus after being reassured on the acquisition and being promoted to oversee Olympus' European businesses and appointed to the main Olympus board). However, on 30 July 2011, the matter surfaced again, when Woodford's attention as president was drawn by German colleagues to an article in Facta that alleged Olympus had made undisclosed payments for a series of acquisitions some of which were outside its "core" camera and endoscope business, most notably a sum of $687 million apparently paid to advisers as part of the Gyrus acquisition.

The eventual cost of the Transaction to Olympus is extremely significant and is as a result of a number of actions taken by management which are questionable and which give cause for concern ... We were unable to confirm that there has been improper conduct, however, given the sums of money involved and some of the unusual decisions that have been made it cannot be ruled out at this stage ... In addition, there are a number of other potential offences to consider including false accounting, financial assistance and breaches of directors' duties by the board.

— PriceWaterhouseCoopers report on the 2008 Olympus acquisitions

Woodford said that he asked Hisashi Mori and some confidants about the Facta report, and stated also that at a lunch meeting in August with Kikukawa and Hisashi Mori, Olympus' compliance officer, Kikukawa revealed he ordered staff not to tell Woodford about the allegations because Woodford was "too busy" dealing with other matters. Kikukawa dismissed the article as "tabloid, sensationalist journalism". Upon learning about a second article referring to payments by Olympus to "anti-social forces", a euphemism for yakuza (Japanese criminal organisations), The Japan Times notes that from the start, Facta remained the lone Japanese journal to scoop the Olympus accounting irregularities until the scandal broke in Western media sources after Woodford exposed the matter. Woodford began to write a series of six letters to Mori and/or Kikukawa regarding his concerns as to governance issues "relating to the company's M&A (acquisitions) activities". Woodford copied later letters to the company's auditors, and threatened to resign if he did not receive satisfactory responses about the 2008 Gyrus acquisition costs, and the goodwill impairment of around $600 million made that year for the other acquisitions.

On 1 April 2011, Woodford was promoted to the post of president and chief operating officer, replacing Kikukawa and becoming the first ever non-Japanese chairman of Olympus.

=== Woodford's appointment as CEO ===
Six months after Woodford's appointment as COO and President, on 1 October, he was elevated to chief executive officer, with Olympus stating that since his appointment as president/COO, "the Board have been extremely pleased with the progress made under Mr. Woodford's leadership in this role, which has exceeded the expectations at the time of his appointment." At the time of Woodford's appointment, he was regarded as an unlikely choice. Reuters reports there were rumours that he only got the job because he would be "easy to control"; some Japanese observers saw Woodford, who speaks no Japanese, as Kikukawa's new pet. An article in Facta underlined the sceptics' views, saying "The fact that the company picked a bottom-ranking foreign executive director with virtually no significant responsibilities from amongst a total pool of 25 potential candidates, including the vice-president who was responsible for medical instruments ... set tongues a-wagging."

Woodford's promotion was announced through a press statement without calling a news conference. The press release, which was full of praise for Woodford, mentioned his success in cutting costs and presented him as the "new global face of Olympus". According to Woodford, Kikukawa had reminded him privately upon appointing him president: "I am the one who has the authority to hire and fire, and to decide remuneration for board members and the next tier down of management," thus signalling Woodford was "little more than his puppet". The New York Times similarly suggested that the promotion may have been intended to instill Woodford with a greater sense of loyalty to the board, and Woodford suggested it was done to reduce his motivation to resign. Nikkei Business noted that the announcement was made only in its English web page, and after talking to Olympus, it commented: "Woodford's title had changed from COO to CEO, but it did not signify any real change in the company's leadership. Woodford himself was soon to realise that his appointment to CEO was in name only."

=== Woodford's removal as CEO ===
If the intention of the promotion was to deter Woodford's questions, it did not have the intended effect. Following his appointment, Woodford persisted in pressing the issue of the questionable transactions, and, based on his belief that an internal probe would not get all the necessary answers, he also engaged accounting firm PricewaterhouseCoopers (PwC) to give substance to his suspicions. Woodford copied his final two letters to senior members of the Ernst & Young organisation (auditors to Olympus) in Japan, Europe and the United States, as well as their global chairman and CEO. PwC's report highlighted that as part of the deals, a "success fee" – an intermediary's fee for closing an acquisition deal – of $687 million for the Gyrus acquisition was paid to two small firms, US-based Axes America LLC and Cayman Islands-based Axam Investments Ltd. PwC also examined the transactions resulting in the $600 million write-down.

Michael C. Woodford has largely diverted from the rest of the management team in regard to the management direction and method, and it is now causing problems for decision making by the management team.

Hence, judging that realisation of the 2010 Corporate Strategic Plan with its slogan of "Advancing to the Next Stage of Globalisation" would be difficult to achieve by the management team led by Woodford, all the board directors attending today, except for Woodford himself who could not participate in the voting due to special interest, unanimously resolved the dismissal from his office of the representative director.

— Olympus press release: Olympus Corporation Resolved Dismissal of President Michael C. Woodford

Kikukawa convened an emergency board meeting on 14 October, and then, arriving late, cancelled the circulated agenda and asked the board to consider removing Woodford from his post of chief executive. Woodford was not allowed to speak or vote; the motion was carried unanimously, although he retained his seat on the board of directors. Kikukawa circulated a staff email the same day, stating that the departure was due to differences in management style, and that Woodford had "ignored established decision-making processes and created many wedges among the managers and within the organization ... vastly different to what we had expected of him, which was to accelerate decision-making and speed up the management."

After Woodford's removal, Kikukawa was re-appointed president and CEO of Olympus. One week later, he accused Woodford of having created "a gang" of direct reports that circumvented Mori, his supposed immediate subordinate. Kikukawa resigned on 26 October "to restore confidence in the company under the new management". At the press conference, he declared Olympus to be clean, continued to accuse Woodford of attempting to seize power, and maintained Woodford was "autocratic", and that his alleged offences "included intimidation of my own staff." By contrast, Woodford alleged that his forced departure was linked to several prior acquisitions and payments he questioned, particularly the US$2.2 billion deal in 2008 to acquire British medical equipment maker Gyrus Group, and said on Bloomberg Television: "The board has to go, they're all toxic, they are all contaminated." On 30 November, Woodford announced that he would resign from the Olympus board, saying that his decision was unrelated to the official investigations in Japan, the UK, and the USA. He added that his resignation was necessary in the context, and that he was "committed to ensuring that Olympus has the best possible opportunity to succeed going forward, starting with a new and untainted board of directors."

=== Company's initial announcements following Woodford's departure ===
During a conference call with investors on 17 October (reported in a Morgan Stanley research note), Olympus Executive Vice-President Hisashi Mori said the company might sue Woodford for releasing internal information to news media. Olympus issued statements on 19 October defending the acquisitions of Altis, News Chef, and Humalabo, saying that they "were determined to have great potential in the medical and health care industries." Press reported that although the three companies had "minuscule capital funds", their combined business value was estimated at between ¥96.9–124.6 billion (US$1.3–1.6 billion). Olympus denied that the acquisitions were unrelated to the core business. The description given of the companies on 19 October, and how they fit into the group's strategy, were contradicted by the later statement: initially, Altis was described as being engaged in "environmental solutions business proposing resources recycling and CO_{2} reduction focused on petrochemical plants." In a 27 October disclosure, the unit was "mainly engaged in recycling business for medical waste." Humalabo was initially said to undertake "research and development/sale of skin improving substances using [a fungus known as] basidomycota", but in the later statement was said to be "mainly engaged in development of [health] supplements with ingredients extracted from shiitake mushroom mycelium." While the basic description of News Chef as a maker of cookware for microwave ovens was not changed, Olympus added that "disease prevention and prognosis through foods" was one of its objects.

We wish to make a profound apology for all of the distress and trouble caused due to the recent series of media reports and fall in the stock prices triggered by our recent change in President ... We shall provide updates in a timely manner through the Tokyo Stock Exchange's disclosure network and our website ... We sincerely hope to conclude this situation as quickly as possible to restore society's trust in us and to bring reassurance to our customers, business partners, shareholders and employees ...
The past acquisitions mentioned in the media were handled with the appropriate evaluation and procedures ... These transactions were in no way improper and we are setting up an external panel of experts to examine and report on this acquisitions activity.

— Official statement on Olympus website, 26 October

Olympus said on 19 October that the value of the stakes in the three companies had been impaired by ¥55.7 billion – more than three-quarters of the acquisition cost, blaming it on "worsened external environment following the 2008 recession." However, it later admitted that "the business prospect diverged from the assumption we had at the time of the investment."

As we have troubled our customers, business partners and shareholders over a series of press reports and a slump in share prices, chairman and president Tsuyoshi Kikukawa today returned his titles, as well as his right to representation ...

Mr Kikukawa will become a director without executive rights ... Shuichi Takayama, a current director, will replace him as president.

— Olympus statement announcing departure of Kikugawa

At a press conference in Tokyo on 27 October, president Takayama blamed Woodford for the decline in the company's share price, saying "If this secret information had not been leaked, there would have been no change in our corporate value." Takayama said the amounts paid for Gyrus "will pay off considering what value we will gain from the Gyrus acquisition in the future." He further justified the purchase of the three small Japanese companies as part of a strategy "to find new growth areas to reduce our over-reliance on the endoscope business." However, Mori, who was the main speaker, and Takayama were criticised by impatient journalists for their responses that meandered without addressing the issues.

=== Olympus' internal investigation ===
Olympus delegated the task of selecting members of its third-party panel to investigate the allegations to two men who were appointed to the board in June: Yasuo Hayashida, a physician and visiting professor at Juntendo University, and Hiroshi Kuruma, a former executive at Nikkei Business. On 1 November, Olympus announced the composition of its third-party panel, headed by lawyer and former Supreme Court justice, Tatsuo Kainaka. The panel would include four lawyers and one certified public accountant.

In the week of 6 November, Olympus announced that Hisashi Mori had been dismissed and auditor Hideo Yamada had resigned. At a press conference, Takayama revealed he had known "absolutely nothing" about the scheme until Mori informed him earlier in the week. He said Kikugawa, Mori, and Yamada were not responsible for the initial investments, but had covered up the losses "with the company's best interests at heart".

It has become clear that advisory fees and funds used to buy back preferred shares in the acquisition of Gyrus, as well as funds used in the purchase of three new domestic businesses ... were used, among other things, to dispose of unrealised losses on securities, the reporting of which had been put off.

— Olympus statement about advisory fees, November 2011

At the news conference, Takayama bowed as he apologised for the "highly inappropriate disposal" of the losses. The Financial Times said Takayama had not addressed "the size and origin of Olympus' past losses; the identity of the executives who approved the initial cover-up; the exact means by which it was executed; and the reason it took so long to dispose of the bad assets."

Ahead of the much-awaited board meeting on 25 November, to be attended by Woodford, two directors – Kikukawa and Mori – announced their resignation; Yamada, who enjoyed observer status on the board, also resigned. Separately, current president Shuichi Takayama said the board members would resign once "the path to Olympus' revival became clear." However, Woodford said: "If they have an iota of care for the company then they should ... resign in the near future."

According to Olympus, eight executives including Takayama were to take pay cuts of between 30 and 50 per cent starting December, to take responsibility for the accounting scandal; Takayama's salary would be halved.

In mid-January 2012, Olympus published its panel's report. It decided that five individuals were responsible: auditors Minoru Ota and Katsuo Komatsu, outside auditors Makoto Shimada and Yasuo Nakamura, and standing auditor Tadao Imai. Ota was held responsible for ¥3.7 billion, having been the head of the accounting division at the time the losses were made in the 1990s, the others were held jointly responsible for around ¥4.7 billion for overlooking the illegal activities. The report cleared KPMG and Ernst & Young of any responsibility for the accounting fraud at the company and concluded that the scheme had been too well concealed. The report said: "The masterminds of this case were hiding the illegal acts by artfully manipulating experts' opinions."

== Regulator and law enforcement action ==
Following his dismissal, Woodford quickly travelled back to London, where he passed on a file of information to the British Serious Fraud Office, and requested police protection. He hinted that the payments may have been linked to "forces behind" the Olympus board; Japanese newspaper Sankei went further, to suggest that the payments could be linked to the Yakuza. The Financial Times reported that relevant authorities in several jurisdictions were investigating the case. The Federal Bureau of Investigation (FBI), to which Woodford had also given files about the suspicious transactions, opened its case in mid-October; other federal law enforcement agencies, including federal prosecutors in Manhattan, had also taken an interest. The SEC was said to be examining Axes America. Experts speculated that US investigators were assessing whether there were kickbacks to Olympus officials or whether money laundering or other illicit acts were involved. The British Serious Fraud Office and the FBI were said to be working with the Japanese Financial Services Agency. Olympus disclosed that they were being investigated by the Tokyo Metropolitan Police, while unnamed sources said that a unit of the Tokyo police dealing with organised crime may also be involved in the investigation. The Japanese Securities and Exchange Surveillance Commission (SESC) and the Tokyo Stock Exchange are also reported to have taken an interest in the case.

The New York Times published details of an official investigators' memorandum prepared for the SESC, the Tokyo prosecutor's office and the Tokyo Metropolitan Police Department which stated the true magnitude of losses was ¥481 billion ($6.25 billion). It said that of the "questionable acquisition payments, investments and advisory fees" made between 2000 and 2009, only ¥105 billion has been accounted for in some way. Investigators named Tsubasa Net, a software maker acquired by Olympus through ITX in 2005, as "a front company" with known affiliations with the Yamaguchi Gumi, the largest of Japan's yakuza organisations. Altis, Humalabo and News Chef – acquisitions advised by Global Company – were also identified as front companies with links to organised crime. The headquarters of Olympus Corp. was visited by Japanese prosecutors on 21 December 2011 as part its investigation; NHK TV said the home of Tsuyoshi Kikukawa, former Olympus president, was also targeted by authorities looking into wrongdoing.

The Tokyo District Court handed several rulings on this case (for details, see sections Criminal lawsuit and Civil lawsuit).

== Other external responses and actions ==
=== Auditors ===
The accounts of Olympus were audited in the 1990s by the Japanese affiliate of then "Big Five" accounting firm Arthur Andersen until the latter collapsed in 2002, when KPMG Azsa became its auditor. KPMG remained the auditor up until 2009, after which the Ernst & Young ShinNihon (EY) took over. At no point were any major issues signalled by the company's auditors; The Financial Times (FT) reported that KPMG had raised some questions when the firm audited Olympus, but audit reports were always unqualified, and EY signed off on "clean" audit reports in 2010 and 2011. According to an email sent by former chairman Tsuyoshi Kikukawa that Michael Woodford made public, Olympus had replaced KPMG with EY after the former expressed disagreement with the accounting treatment of the Gyrus acquisition. The FT queried why, this being the case, KPMG had signed off on the 2009 accounts. Tsutomu Okubo raised a question in the upper house of the Diet as to why the auditors apparently failed to stop the cover-up; the Japanese Institute of Certified Accountants said that it would look into the auditors' role.

According to a letter filed with the UK Registrar of Companies, the auditors to Gyrus resigned "partly because of its client's accounting for the securities". KPMG qualified Gyrus' accounts because they could not ascertain that Axam was not a related party. The auditors also took issue with the accounting treatment of the preference shares. In its audit letter to Gyrus Group dated 26 April 2010, KPMG considered that there were "circumstances connected with our ceasing to hold office that should be brought to the attention of the company's members or creditors." Ernst & Young, the firm that succeeded KPMG, also expressed reservations about the 2010 Gyrus accounts for uncertainty, due to the lack of information about Axam. Bloomberg noted that both Gyrus annual reports were filed late: instead of filing within the nine-month statutory limit, the accounts were filed more than a year from the company's year end. In late November 2011 Michael Andrew, KPMG International global chairman, said his firm had complied with its legal obligations to pass on information related to Olympus's 2008 acquisition of Gyrus, and were removed as auditors for so doing. Andrew said: "It's pretty evident to me there was very, very significant fraud and that a number of parties had been complicit." However, the while the Japanese firm forced a ¥71 billion restatement of dubious valuation of certain acquired assets, the firm signed off on the financial statements in the same year that contained questionable figures other members of its global network in UK and elsewhere had apparently expressed grave reservations over.

Although the Olympus inquiry had questioned the auditors' signing off on the accounting treatment of preferred shares, and whether the handover from KPMG to Ernst & Young in 2009 was thorough, EY's own review in turn questioned "the thoroughness and accuracy" of the Olympus inquiry's findings. The EY concluded there were "no problems with the handover in terms of the guidelines," but were looking into what more could have been done. It further said that its powers of investigation were limited by their inability to question the outgoing audit firm.

=== Stock market and stakeholder reactions ===
Olympus had a market capitalisation of ¥673 billion on 13 October 2011, immediately before Woodford was sacked. By the end of the next day, the valuation had fallen to ¥422 billion ($5.5 billion). Analysts at Goldman Sachs, Deutsche Bank and Nomura Securities, concerned about corporate governance issues at the company as well as its balance sheet, all immediately downgraded their stock ratings. Goldman Sachs, who had only upgraded its rating in a report dated 12 October, suspended its coverage after Woodford was removed from office. Nomura and JPMorgan announced on 20 October that their coverage of the company was halted. It was reported that Government of Singapore Investment Corp., the Singapore sovereign wealth fund which was one of the principal shareholders, immediately disposed of its 2 percent stake on the first hint of scandal. The share price plunged several days running upon market fears that the shares would be delisted as the company could not meet its reporting mandatory deadline for its quarterly results; in the week to 18 November Nippon Life announced that its stake had been reduced by one-third, from 8.18 per cent to 5.11 per cent, because of the uncertainty; Mitsubishi reduced its stake from 10 per cent to 7.6 per cent.

Some major foreign institutional investors have pushed to bring back ousted chief executive Michael Woodford: UK fund manager Baillie Gifford, Harris Associates, and Southeastern Asset Management, owning respectively 4 percent, 5 percent and 5 percent stake, all believed he was the best candidate to lead the clean-up. Other investors have demanded more disclosures from the company about the state of its affairs. Domestic investors, including Nippon Life Insurance (8.4 percent stake), demanded "prompt action".

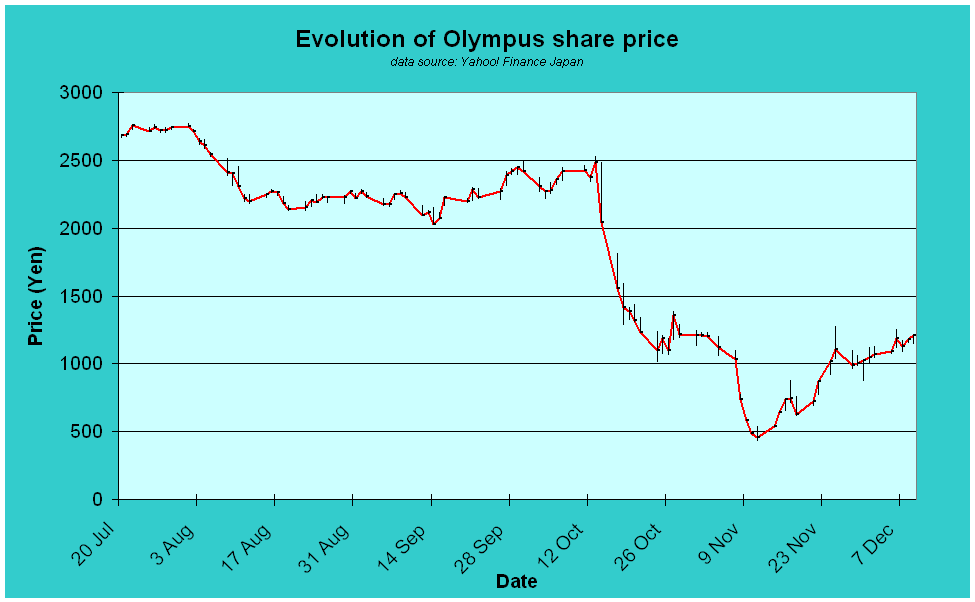
Chart showing Olympus share price between 20 July and 9 December 2011

On 2 November, a shareholder from Nara Prefecture was reported to have asked the company's auditor to bring a case against former executives of Olympus to court to reimburse ¥140 billion ($1.79 billion) to the company, failing which he will sue them through another rights group, Lawyers for Shareholders' Rights. Two American law firms announced that they were initiating "investigations" of Olympus Corporation and some of its directors and were seeking investors who purchased Olympus ADRs between 7 November 2006 and 7 November 2011 on the grounds that the company's share price had been inflated through false accounting and that directors had hidden substantial losses by "false statements and material omissions".

The quotation price of Olympus shares on the Tokyo Stock Exchange (TSE) on 15 November had fallen by some 75 percent since the scandal erupted. The price continued to be volatile: trading was halted as its price hit the limit for price falls. On 14 and 15 November, after the threat of delisting ebbed, trading in its shares was once again halted when buy orders heavily outnumbered sell orders; the price rose by the upper limit of ¥100. Trading only took place after hours as there was a glut of unsatisfied buy orders. The share price rose in four straight trading sessions, reaching 834 yen at one point on 16 November.

Many long-time employees of Olympus Corp were shocked and angry, and felt betrayed by the executives who were responsible for bringing public humiliation onto the company. Former director Koji Miyata started a web site, called Olympus Grassroots, demanding clean-up at the company they say they love. Miyata also circulated a petition targeted at employees calling on the reinstatement of Woodford. As Olympus has a 70-percent market share in endoscopy, the scandal caused anxiety and concern among the medical profession, which sees Olympus endoscopes as irreplaceable.

While foreign shareholders supported Woodford's proxy fight to replace the Olympus board, he failed to gain support from Japanese institutions; Sumitomo Mitsui bank, identified as the company's main creditor, warned Woodford that he would fail. Woodford was disappointed by their silence, but acknowledged that even had he won a shareholder vote to become chief executive, the antipathy towards him of major shareholders and creditors, and the discomfort within the company about his decision to publicly disclose the accounting irregularities, would have made running the company difficult. On 6 January 2012, on failing to secure support from Japanese institutional shareholders, Woodford said that the 12-week public scandal had taken an enormous emotional toll on him and his family, and announced that he would abandon his proxy fight to take control of the Olympus board. Instead, his lawyers had initiated legal proceedings in London seeking unspecified damages for dismissal from his four-year contract.

Olympus convened an extraordinary shareholders' meeting for 20 April 2012 to vote on its proposal for the new board and to approve the restated accounts. The board slate consisted of 11 candidates, the majority of whom were "completely independent" of Olympus. The company controversially sought to promote its executive officer, Hiroyuki Sasa, to president; its candidate for chairman was Yasuyuki Kimoto, a former senior executive of Sumitomo Mitsui Banking Corp. – the largest creditor of Olympus. Another proposed director is Hideaki Fujizuka, formerly with the Bank of Tokyo-Mitsubishi. While the company argued the candidates were well-qualified, a shareholder advisory firm urged investors to vote down the proposed president citing his lack of experience as a corporate manager of a turnaround situation; it also expressed concern that the ex-bankers may put banks' interests ahead of shareholders'. ISS also recommended shareholders not to approve the accounts on grounds that it could undermine any legal recourse they may want to pursue in future. Foreign shareholders oppose the nominations, citing "undue influence" of the creditor banks.

=== Corporate governance concerns ===
Masaki Shizuka of the TSE expressed the concern that "investor confidence in information provided by the company may decline." Tsutomu Okubo, who is to chair a new working team to discuss reforms to the company act to strengthen corporate governance, questioned whether the corporate auditor system was functioning properly, and whether the company's accountants were acting as a proper check on management. Toshio Oguchi, representative director of Governance for Owners in Tokyo, argued that the affair pointed to a dysfunctional board: "Even if they didn't know about the tobashi, the fact that the board approved the payment cannot have been a correct decision."

The acquisition price tag was justified using sales forecast for the three companies – Altis, Humalabo and News Chef – of ¥88.5 billion (US$1.2 billion) for the fiscal year ending March 2013 – which CFO Asia said was "practically impossible to achieve". It further noted that the combined sales targets for the three companies for the fiscal year to March 2012 were subsequently reduced by 93 percent to a combined ¥6.5 billion (US$85.7 million). Despite the suspicions of wrongdoing, Olympus strongly denied suggestions that the transactions were "something illegal or unauthorized". CFO Asia said that if there was truly no corporate malfeasance, there are "uncomfortable questions about the competence of the internal and external teams that evaluated the three acquisitions, as well as the capabilities of the senior managers and board members that accepted the sky-high valuations and approved the deals." Nikkei Business said similarly that the size of the losses "could very well call management responsibility into question".

In a commentary in the Financial Times entitled "Olympus's deceit was dishonourable", John Gapper noted that "It is still possible to believe that the accused trio of directors ... thought they were behaving honourably ... [in hiding] failure discreetly and not to make their predecessors lose face." He noted that accounting scandals were not uniquely Japanese, but that it was "a nice piece of corporate satire to conceal losses by exploiting the widespread habit of paying too much for acquisitions and writing them down – the 'advisory fee' was especially creative". Gapper criticised the weakness in governance, particularly how 12 out of 15 directors were either executives or former executives of the company, and that Hideo Yamada, head of the Audit Board, was complicit in the scam. He also noted that auditors KPMG and Ernst & Young would have to answer tough questions about why the manipulation was never discovered or properly questioned.

Investors have expressed opinions that the management of such listed companies have unfairly damaged their corporate value counter to shareholder interests and have cited underlying problems in the quality of Japanese corporate governance ... They have even expressed fears that such issues are occurring in other listed companies.

— Tokyo Stock Exchange statement

Bloomberg View columnist William Pesek said: "Japan's corporate culture of denial, of ignoring problems and letting them fester, keeps running up against a globalized world that values agility, innovation and transparency. Olympus demonstrates all too painfully how much Old Japan tolerates a lack of accountability among senior executives; inadequate disclosure; a disinclination to challenge authority and absolute deference to corporate boards regardless of share performance." While he also observed that the independence of the directors was inadequate, he said Japanese executives were much more moderately paid compared to American ones. "Shareholders assume directors are smart, devoted people working for the good of Japan Inc. Tough questions are rarely asked." Errol Oh of The Star said a company apology for a fall in the share price "trivialises the possible wrongdoings and misplaces emphasis on an effect rather than the cause ... Takayama's remark on the 'inconvenience' of a fall in share price reflects a common flaw in the mindset of the people who run listed companies. Somehow, they lose sight of the fact that they manage businesses, not share prices."

During a press conference in early November, Financial Services minister Shozaburo Jimi said the market should not call into question the standards of corporate governance of other listed companies just because of Olympus. However, some journals linked the case of Daio Paper Corp, also subject of a scandal involving diversion of funds by its chairman.

=== Other commentary ===
Floyd Norris of The New York Times said the cause of the losses was rooted in the Plaza Accord that caused the value of the dollar to slide from 250 yen in 1984, to 121 yen by the end of 1987, heavily penalising Japanese exports. "It turns out that it was an effort to make the company's [balance sheet] accurate ... It now appears the chairman reacted with righteous indignation. He had not stolen; he had only tried to clean up a mess without damaging the reputation of generations of Olympus executives." Floyd says that the third-party investigation report commissioned by Olympus infers "there had been no need to tell Mr. Woodford about what had happened because the fraud was finally behind the company when Mr. Woodford took the job."

Financial Times questioned why the Japanese auditor firm signed off on the financial statements in the same year when other members of its global network apparently refused to give clean bills of financial heath to Olympus subsidiaries such as Gyrus in the UK, and elsewhere. One analyst suggests the poor performance of Japanese auditors may be due to low pay, and overwork due to the shortage of certified public accountants: audit fees are up to one-fifth of that of comparable US companies; there are 17,000 CPAs in Japan, compared with 330,000 in the US.

The Economist said that the Olympus scandal "is not an accounting misdeed—it is a mindset. Olympus, and the response of Japanese officialdom, is less about a single sad incident as it is a view about the malleability of rules, and the subjectivity of their enforcement. Until Japan's institutions of governance—those internal to the corporations, as well external regulators and prosecutors—change, Japan cannot change."

== Aftermath ==
=== Woodford after the scandal ===
During 2011 and 2012, Woodford was recognised as "Businessperson of the Year" for bravery and whistleblowing by The Sunday Times, The Independent and The Sun, and "Person of the Year" at the Financial Times ArcelorMittal "Boldness in Business Awards" in March 2012. He consults on corporate governance worldwide, speaks on human rights, whistleblower laws, and road safety, and states he had given several millions of pounds to charities. Woodford, who stated he had received death threats over his exposing of the cover-up, settled a lawsuit against Olympus for defamation and wrongful dismissal for £10 million in 2012. A book was also undertaken. Woodford stated his concerns that, far from learning from the scandal, Japan's response was to become even more secretive and unsupportive of change in areas highlighted by the scandal.

=== Olympus and wider aftermath after the scandal ===
In 2012, Olympus also announced it would shed 2,700 jobs (7% of its workforce) and around 40 per cent of its 30 manufacturing plants by 2015 to reduce its cost base. In July 2013, Kikugawa and Mori were both sentenced to 3 years in prison, 5 years suspended. The auditor who had been party to the fraud was sentenced to 2.5 years in prison, 4 years suspended. Olympus was fined 700 million yen (US$7 million). In April 2014, six banks filed a civil suit against Olympus over the fraud, seeking an additional 28 billion yen in damages.

The corporate culture exposed by the scandal is seen as the inspiration for the record-breaking drama Hanzawa Naoki.

=== Popular culture ===
In 2015, the television documentary 1.7 Billion Dollar Fraud: Full Exposure was aired on BBC 4. It had a limited theatrical release in Japan in 2018 and renamed as Samurai and Idiots: The Olympus Affair.

== Details of the suspect transactions ==
In the early 1990s, Yamaichi Securities was Olympus' main broker, but went bankrupt after accumulating ¥260 billion in tobashi investment losses. In 1998, Nomura succeeded as Olympus' main broker. Prompted by the Yamaichi collapse, new "mark to market" accounting rules were made mandatory in 1999, from which time companies were obliged to disclose losses on their securities investments in a timely manner.

Thomson Reuters reported that a fee of US$687 million, equal to 31 percent of the Gyrus acquisition price, was paid to a middle-man, whereas this is usually 1–2 percent. As part of his proof, Woodford released the report from PwC which showed that the sum of $670 million of the advisory payments was paid over to AXAM Investments Ltd., a Cayman Islands company. In June 2010, three months after receiving its final fees from Olympus, it was struck off by local company registry for non-payment of licence fees. Olympus revealed that the Axes fee included fees paid to Perella Weinberg Partners UK, who acted as financial advisor, and US law firm Weil, Gotshal & Manges, who acted as legal advisers.

The Telegraph said it has seen documents indicating a "Mr Sagawa" was a director of Axam Investments and Axes America that received a $687 million advisory fee for the Gyrus acquisition. The Financial Times said its principals were former Nomura employees. The link to the scam caused Nomura shares to fall, though the bank denied involvement, claiming it was "based on speculation and not on fact". Akio Nakagawa and Hajime Sagawa, both of whom started their careers at Nomura Securities and were also colleagues at Drexel Burnham Lambert and PaineWebber, were behind Axes, according to Reuters. Nakagawa, who was once head of equities at PaineWebber in Japan in the early 1990s, had long-standing relationship with Olympus. A former Paine Webber banker attested that Nakagawa and Sagawa were handlers for Olympus, and they made use of Bermuda-based funds valued at "hundreds of millions of dollars" to manage its balance sheet using Japanese accounting loopholes. Axes America, having negotiated the success fee for Gyrus in a combination of cash and stock, then transferred the stock component to AXAM Investments, an affiliate registered in the Cayman Islands. In 2010, the stock was sold back to Olympus for $620 million.

Nobumasa Yokoo, former banker who had dealt with Olympus when he worked for Nomura, is also cited as being behind certain other of the transactions under the spotlight. Having founded Global Company in the late 1990s, he persuaded Olympus to invest ¥30 billion in their venture capital fund in 2000. In 2003, Olympus made a piecemeal acquisition of an information technology group, ITX. Akinobu Yokoo, Yokoo's older brother, was chief financial officer for ITX. The elder Yokoo became a group executive officer after Olympus became majority owners. Nobumasa Yokoo also introduced three small, unprofitable companies in which he was shareholder and executive that Olympus acquired for ¥73.4 billion – News Chef, a maker of microwave cookware, Altis and Humalabo. According to The Wall Street Journal (WSJ), Olympus acquired the companies from Cayman Island-based funds between 2007 and 2010. Nikkei Business reported informed sources deriding these as "shell companies". Part of the transaction took place on 25 April 2008, when Olympus paid the equivalent of 7 million to funds named Dynamic Dragons II and Global Targets. Seventeen Cayman and BVI special purpose vehicles were used to make payments; funds flowed through Commerzbank AG, Societe Generale SA and LGT Bank. The WSJ noted that there were a large number of frequent and complex corporate changes (name and ownership) but determined from the paper trail that Dynamic Dragons II "was part of a network of elusive Japanese firms and financiers that often invested together, and whose ties and identities were constantly shifting." Kenji Takasago, associate professor at Kobe University suggested the complexity of the scheme was to obscure the money trail.

Jake Adelstein, former crime reporter for the Yomiuri Shimbun, said these three acquired companies "shared addresses and office space with several other companies with different names but sometimes the same employees, creating a web of real and paper companies that make tracking the money very difficult." He also alleged that Japanese authorities considered one of the auditors involved "a corporate blood brother ... to the Yamaguchi-gumi." Sankei Shimbun said there were perhaps 10 brokers involved in the acquisition schemes, and that while they "are not members of crime syndicates themselves ... [some] ... conduct economic activities together with antisocial forces ... There is the possibility that Olympus has supplied cash (to organised crime) as a result." However, the investigatory panel set up by Olympus rejected the reports allegations that the acquisition funds could found their way to organised crime. Panel chairman Tatsuo Kainaka said "Our committee has confirmed no such facts in its investigations so far."

=== Structure of Gyrus commission ===
In mid June 2006 Olympus paid US-registered Axes America the sum of $3 million in "basic fees", and agreed to pay a "completion fee of 1 percent of the acquisition price in addition to the basic fee for advisory work relating to acquisitions." One year later, the agreed rate of "completion fee" to Axes was increased to 5 percent, payable in a mixture of cash, share options and warrants; it disbursed a further $2 million. When the Gyrus acquisition was announced, Olympus paid over $12 million, being the cash portion of the agreed "completion fee". In September 2008, to top up the cash part of the advisors' success fee, Gyrus issued ¥176.98 million of preferred stock to the AXAM against the advice of company auditors, according to Nikkei Business Daily. Olympus paid over a further $50 million, nominally as cash settlement for warrants. Regulatory disclosures in the UK show that the preferred stock was allotted on 30 September by Tsuyoshi Kikukawa, Hisashi Mori and Akihiro Nambu (the latter being head of investor relations for Olympus). The identity of the beneficiary – Axam Investments – was only made publicly known more than 18 months later. Three days after the preferred stock was allotted and without the benefit of professional advice, a "supplemental agreement" was signed by Olympus officers that gave AXAM power of veto over "any important decision in the Gyrus business".

A buyback of preferred shares for $530–590 million was authorised by the Olympus board. Axam subsequently negotiated a further increase in the value of the shares, for which Olympus finally paid $620 million in March 2010. According to a UK corporate filing for Gyrus, the value of the securities at the time was disclosed as $177 million. Bloomberg notes that executives Olympus had delayed accounting for the true cost of the "success fees" of Gyrus until March 2011, by which time Axam Investments had been struck off by the Cayman Islands registrar for nine months.

== Timeline ==
=== The incident ===
Before 2011
- 1981 – Woodford joins Olympus as a surgical salesman, later becoming managing director of a British medical subsidiary
- Late 1980s and 1990s – Olympus makes substantial losses in financial trading, believed to be an attempt to mitigate poor trading results, due in part to Japan's weak currency. It conceals the losses using an unlawful but widespread practice known as a Tobashi scheme, or Tobashi.
- Around 2008 – Olympus buys three companies paying far more than they are worth, the balance being unaccounted "fees" to a middle-man of around 30%, controlling the matter directly from Japan although the companies are in Europe, Woodford's region. The deals are for over $2 billion.
- 2008 – Woodford, by now responsible for considerable business across Europe, attempts to tender his resignation over the "strange" European acquisitions that should have been within his oversight but were instead directly controlled by Tokyo officials. (The same acquisitions later became part of the public scandal when he revisited them as COO and CEO in 2011). He is given plausible reassurances and also promoted to run Olympus' entire European business.

2011
- 1 April – Woodford appointed Olympus president and chief operating officer (COO)
- 10 July – Allegations of corporate irregularities surface in Facta, a Japanese magazine
- Three weeks 23 September to 11 October –

- After hearing of the allegations by email "from German colleagues" and unable to find satisfactory answers internally, Woodford writes several times to the board as CEO seeking answers, but is rebuffed or unsatisfied.
- Around end September – Woodford asks chief executive Tsuyoshi Kikukawa about the claims; Kikukawa cedes his role as CEO
- 1 October – Woodford appointed Olympus chief executive officer (CEO) following a board vote the previous day (30 September). The company press release stated that since April 2011's appointment as president/COO, "the Board have been extremely pleased with the progress made under Mr. Woodford's leadership in this role, which has exceeded the expectations at the time of his appointment". Kikukawa remains as chairman.
- Around early October – Still lacking satisfactory responses, Woodford appoints outside audit practice PwC to investigate

- 14 October – Woodford dismissed at a short board meeting; he leaves, and discloses his concerns publicly
- 8 November – Olympus makes admissions related to the scandal
- 24 November – Kikukawa and Mori resign from board; remainder state they will also resign in 2012
- 1 to 14 December – Woodford unsuccessfully attempts to regain previous CEO role, but lacks sufficient support
- 20 December – Olympus reportedly makes plans to reduce Woodford's allies' ability to intervene by means of stock arrangements that would dilute their voting power

=== Criminal lawsuit ===
2012
- 16 February – 7 arrests in Tokyo: ex-president Tsuyoshi Kikukawa, former executive vice-president Hisashi Mori, former statutory auditor Hideo Yamada, former bankers Akio Nakagawa and Nobumasa Yokoo, and two others
2013
- 3 July – The Tokyo District Court ordered a fine of 700 million yen (USD 7 million) against Olympus Corporation for breaching the Financial Instruments and Exchange Act. Tsuyoshi Kikukawa, Hideo Yamada and Hisashi Mori were given 4 to 5 years of suspended sentence.
- 5 September – The Financial Services Agency of the Japanese government ordered a fine of 20 million yen (USD 200,000) against Olympus Corporation for breaching the Financial Instruments and Exchange Act. The original fine announced in July 2012 was 190 million yen (USD 2.4 million), but was reduced by 90% after the Tokyo District Court ordered a 700 million yen (USD 7 million) fine for the same legal violation. (See also: the principle of Non bis in idem)

2014
- 8 December – The Tokyo District Court ordered a suspended sentence of three years with a fine of 7 million yen (USD 70,000) to Akio Nakagawa. This was upheld by the Supreme Court of Japan on 13 June 2018.

2015
- 1 July – The Tokyo District Court sentenced three securities brokers of Olympus. Nobumasa Yokoo, the head of Global Company Inc., was given four years in prison with a fine of 10 million yen (USD 82,000). Taku Hata was given three years in prison with a fine of 6 million yen, while Hiroshi Ono was given four years of suspended sentence with a fine of 4 million yen.
2016–2017

Unknown date – The Tokyo District Court ordered a suspended sentence to Hajime Sagawa for unknown time.

=== Civil lawsuit ===
2012
- 29 May – Woodford and Olympus settle Woodford's claim for damages for a reported £10 million (subject to approval at 8 June board meeting, which was agreed)
2019
- 16 May – In a shareholder derivative suit, the Tokyo District Court handed a fine of 59.4 billion yen (USD 594 million) to the three key players, Tsuyoshi Kikukawa, Hideo Yamada and Hisashi Mori. This is the largest fine of any shareholder derivative suit in Japanese history. The Supreme Court of Japan upheld the ruling on 22 October 2020.
- 22 August – In a shareholder derivative suit, the Tokyo District Court handed a fine of 0.5 billion yen (USD 5 million) to bankers Akio Nakagawa and Hajime Sagawa.

== See also ==
- List of people involved in the Olympus scandal
- Plaza Accord (Foreign exchange)
- Japanese asset price bubble of the late 1980s
- Lost Decade (Japan)
- 1992 Indian stock market scam
- NSE co-location scam
