= Michael Woodford (executive) =

English businessman (born 1960)

Michael Woodford MBE
- Born: Michael Christopher Woodford; 12 June 1960 (age 66); Burton upon Trent, Staffordshire, England
- Education: Millbank College of Commerce
- Known for: Former President and CEO of Olympus Corporation

Michael Christopher Woodford, MBE (born 12 June 1960) is an English businessman who was formerly president and COO (April 2011) and CEO (October 2011) of Japan-based optics and reprography products manufacturer Olympus Corporation.

Joining Olympus in 1981 and rising to manage its European operations, Woodford was the first non-Japanese person to be appointed as the company's CEO in October 2011, having "exceeded expectations" as president and chief operating officer for the previous six months. Within two months, he became a central figure in exposing the Olympus scandal, having been removed from his position after serving two weeks, when he persisted in questioning fees in excess of US$1 billion that Olympus had paid to obscure companies, which appeared to have been used to hide old losses and to have connections to organised crime. The scandal rocked Japanese corporate governance, led to the resignation of the entire Olympus board and several arrests of senior executives, including the previous CEO and chairman, and the company's former auditor and bankers among others, and made Woodford one of the most highly placed executives to turn whistleblower. By 2012 the scandal he exposed had developed into one of the biggest and longest-lived loss-concealing financial scandals in the history of corporate Japan.

Woodford's stance in the scandal, in which he understood his life was at risk due to the criminal organisation connections of some of the suspect monies he had questioned, earned him several awards for "Businessperson of the Year".

Following a settlement for defamation and wrongful dismissal by Olympus, Woodford now consults on corporate governance worldwide, speaks on human rights, whistleblower laws and road safety. He also undertakes philanthropy, and has stated he has given several millions of pounds to charities. In November 2012, Woodford published a book about the Olympus scandal.

== Biography ==
Woodford was born in Staffordshire, but moved from Lichfield to Liverpool with his mother when he was seven after his parents divorced. Woodford attended King David High School, Liverpool.

According to the Olympus website, Woodford, a graduate of Millbank College of Commerce, joined KeyMed, a UK medical-equipment unit of Olympus, in 1981.

By 1986 his concern that identifiable road casualty risks should be recognised and responded to was accepted the Department of Transport.

In 2008, Woodford became executive managing director of Olympus Europa Holding GmbH. Woodford had originally flown to Tokyo to submit his resignation after Olympus purchased Gyrus, a move that would have normally been under Woodford's direct authority but instead had been arranged directly by Tsuyoshi Kikukawa, the then-chairman, president, and CEO of Olympus. Kikukawa instead made Woodford head of all of Olympus's Europe operations and gave him a seat on the board of directors.

In February 2011, due to substantial growth in the European businesses, Woodford was promoted to company president, while Kikukawa stayed on as chairman and CEO. It was reported that Woodford clashed with Kikukawa after the independent magazine Facta began investigating some of Olympus's questionable acquisitions, which eventually compelled Kikukawa to give up his title as CEO.

On 30 September 2011, Woodford was appointed chief executive officer of Olympus Corporation, after 30 years of working for the group, while Kikukawa remained as chairman of the board. He was the first non-Japanese person to be appointed as the company's CEO, making Olympus one of the few Japanese companies to be headed by a foreign businessman (others include Sony, Nissan Motors and Mazda). As the top executive officer in the company, Woodford would have been responsible for selecting his management team. At the time of Woodford's appointment, he was regarded as an unlikely choice. Reuters reports there were rumours that he only got the job because he would be "easy to control"; some Japanese observers saw Woodford, who speaks no Japanese, as the chairman Kikukawa's new pet. An article in Facta underlined the sceptics' views, saying "The fact that the company picked a bottom-ranking foreign executive director with virtually no significant responsibilities from amongst a total pool of 25 potential candidates, including the vice-president who was responsible for medical instruments ... set tongues a-wagging."

Woodford himself was soon to realise that his appointment to CEO was in name only.

— Nikkei Business 1 November 2011

Upon becoming CEO, Woodford discovered that hundreds of millions of dollars had been transferred from Olympus to advisers and companies located in places such as the Cayman Islands. After attempting to seek answers as to why the questionable transactions took place, he was dismissed from his position as president and CEO on 14 October 2011, although he retained his seat on the board of directors. As a result of Woodford's ousting, board chairman Kikukawa reassumed the titles of president and CEO but resigned these positions on 26 October 2011 and was succeeded by Shuichi Takayama. 19 top current and former executives, including six present board members (including Takayama who resigned all his positions and left the company at an extraordinary general meeting in April 2012) are defendants to a lawsuit.

Fearing for his safety after his dismissal, Woodford immediately left Japan and flew to England. After arrival in London, he offered to speak to investigators. He returned to Tokyo on 23 November and later met with investigators and, under police escort, Olympus personnel.

On 30 November 2011, Woodford resigned from the Olympus board but said that he had an "alternative plan" to manage the company by staging a proxy fight. However, it has been reported that Woodford was rejected by Olympus's institutional investors because they were "uncomfortable with the Englishman's combative style and also his plans to recapitalise the company through private equity or a rights issue". On 6 January 2012, on failing to secure support from Japanese institutional shareholders, Woodford announced that he would abandon his proxy fight to take control of the Olympus board. Instead, his lawyers had initiated legal proceedings in London seeking unspecified damages for dismissal from his four-year contract. Woodford said that the 12-week public scandal had taken an enormous emotional toll on him and his family: "I’m not superman. I can’t change opinion in Japan in such a profound way. That has to come from within."

In April 2012, Woodford made a final visit to Tokyo to make a personal inquiry into corruption at the Olympus shareholders meeting. The board of directors refused to answer his questions, after which they were reproved by Japanese institutional investors. Woodford also was able to meet with the anonymous whistleblower whose tip had resulted in the Facta investigation. In June 2012, Woodford was awarded £10 million in an out-of-court settlement with Olympus over his dismissal.

== After Olympus ==
Since 2012, Woodford consults on corporate governance worldwide, speaks on human rights, whistleblower laws and road safety. In November 2012, Woodford published a book about the Olympus scandal, Exposure: Inside the Olympus Scandal: How I Went from CEO to Whistleblower. A film was reportedly also underway.

Woodford stated in 2014 his concerns that far from learning from the scandal, Japan's response was to become even more secretive and unsupportive of change in areas highlighted by the scandal.

== Awards ==
- Member of the Order of the British Empire, 2002 (for services to road safety)
- Freedom of the Borough of Southend-on-Sea, 2003
- Sunday Times Businessperson of the Year 2011
- The Independent Businessperson of the Year 2011
- The Sun Businessperson of the Year 2011
- Person of the Year at the Financial Times ArcelorMittal "Boldness in Business Awards" in March 2012, related to his bravery and whistleblowing.

== See also ==
- List of people involved in the Olympus scandal
