= Editors' Choice Magazine Journalism Award =

Japanese annual prize for journalism

The Editors' Choice Magazine Journalism Award (編集者が選ぶ雑誌ジャーナリズム賞, Hensũsha ga Erabu Zasshi Jānarizumu Shō) is an annual prize for journalism awarded by a coalition of Japanese publishing companies since 1995. Participating companies include mainstream publishers like Kodansha, Shinchosha, and Bungeishunjū.

== Past awards ==
Department	Winner	Winning journalism	Publisher	Dates
1995
Scoop	Kaga Kōei	Downfall of fascist oligarch Ryoichi Sasakawa	Bungeishunjū	1994 June–July
Scoop		Nissan vice president's "lost year"	Gendai	1994 August
Writing	Yadaka Norio	Death of a Pulitzer Prize Cameraman—The Truth	Bungeishunjū	1994 August
Writing	Komori Yoshihisa	Why did a mother die at a university hospital?	Chuo Kōron	1994 February - December
Project		Kotobagari and Discrimination: A Thorough Investigation	Bunshun	1994 February - March
Project	Akiko Satō	"My diary of Tanaka Kakuei"	Shinchō 45	1994 September - November
1996
Scoop (Monthly)	Tatsuwa Iwase	The "Kyoto party" that slew the Ministry of the Treasury bureaucrats	Gendai	1995 May
Scoop (Weekly)		Treasury Minister Nakajima's Side Business	Friday	1995 August
Writing	Fumiya Ichihashi	New evidence in the Glico Morinaga case	Shinchō 45	1995 March
Writing	Fumihiko Takayama	A murdered Fujifilm executive's final letter	VIEWS	1995 January
Project	Shōko Egawa	Early investigations of Aum Shinrikyo	Bungeishunjū	
Project	Tatsuwa Iwase	Corruption under the mask of the mass media	VIEWS	1995 December
Photography		Murder of Hideo Murai	Focus	1995 May
Photography	Takeji Kumagai	Great Hanshin earthquake field photography	Asahi Club	1995 March, and on
1997
Scoop	Anonymous	"I was raped by Ikeda Daisaku"	Shincho	
Scoop	吉田仁	Why did an NEC elite businesswoman kill her children in a fire?	Gendai	
Project	米本和広	Inside the Yamagishi cult	VIEWS	
Project	斎藤貴男	"Erythromycin": medicine or poison?	Shokun!	
Work	黒沼克史	The terrible life of high school girls	Bunshun	
Work	与那原恵	Origins of a myth: the fabricated "rapes" in the Kobe earthquake	Shokun!	
Photography	大倉乾吾 宮嶋茂樹	Photos of Shoko Asahara	Bunshun	
1998
Scoop (Weekly)		Yamaichi Securities: Grave Suspicions	Weekly Toyo Keizai	1997 April・May
Scoop (Monthly)	Okuno Shuuji	Kobe child murders: 28 Years Ago	Bunshun	1997 December
作品賞	佐野眞一	Charisma—Isao Nakauchi's Postwar Revival	日経ビジネス	1997 June
Project	舛添要一	A mother with dementia and her household	Women's Public	1997 November - December
Photography		"Sōkaiya Racketeering"	Focus	1997 April
1999
Scoop (Weekly)		Naoto Kan's Secret Hotel Meeting	Weekly Bunshun	1998 November
Scoop (Monthly)		The Long-Term Credit Bank of Japan Is Bankrupt	Gendai	1998 July
Writing	高山文彦	Kobe child murders—the conditions of the suspect's family	Shincho 45	1998 July
Writing	Uozumi Akira	The Disappearance of Heo Yeong-jung	Weekly Bunshun	1998 May
Project		Dog lover murders—a terrifying letter of confession	Weekly Shincho	1998 November
Project	Eya Osamu	Inside the highest ranks of North Korea: Kim Jong Il's Retainers	SAPIO	
Photography		Kobe child murders principal went to a strip club on graduation day	Focus	1998 March
2000
Scoop (Weekly)		Kobe child murders suspect's letter to his parents	Weekly Bunshun	1999 March
Scoop (Monthly)		Scandal in the national prosecutors' office	Truth and Rumors	1999 May
Writing	Iwase Tetsuya	Biography of Noboru Takeshita	Shincho 45	
Writing	Uozumi Akira	"King of Japan" Tsuneo Watanabe's "glory" and "solitude"	現代	
Project		Johnny & Associates: The Monster of the Entertainment World	Bunshun	1999 October
Project	江藤淳	Wife and I	Bunshun	1999年5月号
Photography		Kincho President's Orgies and Prostitution	Friday	1999年9月17日号
Photography		Tsuneo Watanabe and Soka Gakkai's Secret Pact	Friday	1999 October
2001
Scoop (Weekly)	Kiyoshi Shimizu	Uncovering police complicity in murder of Shiori Ino	FOCUS	
Scoop (Weekly)		KSD scandal reporting	Weekly Asahi	All year
Scoop (Monthly)		Neomugicha incident: a letter from parents	Bunshun	
Scoop (Monthly)		Yoshirō Mori's failures as prime minister	Truth of Rumors	
Writing	本田靖春	"I'm not going to live as a cynic"	Gendai	All year
Writing	日垣隆	Who is Sataka Makoto?	Shokun!	All year
Writing	柳美里	"Life"	Weekly Post	All year
2002
Grand Prize		Politician Ichiro Nakagawa's suicide: 18 years later, the truth	Shincho 45	2001 March
Grand Prize		Ryōko Hirosue "rode a taxi for 150km"	Friday	2001 July
Writing	中尾幸司	Downfall of a household: Murder arrest of a middle school girl	Shincho 45	2001 November - December
Scoop		Kenny Katsuhiko Nomura's Shocking Confession	Weekly Shincho	2001 June
Planning	上杉隆	Investigation of Makiko Tanaka	Weekly Bunshun	2001 May
2003
Grand Prize	溝口敦	Investigation of HANNAN company president	Weekly Gendai	2002 September - December
Scoop		Kiyomi Tsujimoto's misuse of political funds	Weekly Shincho	2001年3月28日号ほか一連の記事
Scoop		Politician Taku Yamasaki's perverted sex fantasies—horrifying photos	Weekly Bunshun	2001 May, and on
Planning		What is a "judge"?	Weekly Shincho	2002 October - December
Photography		Chikage Oogi's husband's secret love	Friday	2002 June
2004
Grand Prize		Nippon TV's sinking viewership—whitewashing and lies	FLASH	2003 November - December
Grand Prize	山田直樹	I Denounce Soka Gakkai, Part 2	Weekly Shincho	2003 November - December
Planning		Investigation of national pension problems	Weekly Gendai	
Work		Investigation of Hiromu Nonaka	Shūkan Gendai	
Issues		Truth and lies about a government official	Bunshun	
Scoop		Senichi Hoshino's so-called "voluntary retirement"	Friday	
2005
Grand Prize		Kōhaku Uta Gassen's $800,000 director's fee	Weekly Bunshun	2004 July
Grand Prize	鵜飼克郎	Fraudulent onsen photos	Weekly Post	2004 July
Scoop		Makiko Esumi's hypocritical pension commercial	Weekly Gendai	2004 April
Work	深山渓	Waseda Elementary School's $35k Entrance Fee	Monthly Gendai	2004 February
Project		Soka Gakkai's Economic Power	Weekly Diamond	2004 August 7
Photography		Saki Takaoka and Tomoyasu Hotei's adulterous kiss	Friday	2004 July
Issues		Mayumi Wakamura's religious cult husband	Women's Seven	2004 March
2006
Grand Prize		Freestyle skier Tae Satoya's nightclub sex	Weekly Bunshun	
Scoop		Taizō Sugimura's concealed engagement breakoff and abortion	Weekly Post	2005 October
Scoop		Murder and arson at the house of Mabuchi Motor president	Weekly Asahi	2005 December, and on
2007
Grand Prize		An economist's love affair	Weekly Post	2006 December
Grand Prize	Machida Tetsu	Nikko Cordial's secret scandal	Monthly Gendai	2006 February
Scoop		Suicide scandal at the Chinese embassy	Weekly Bunshun	2006 January
Writing		Exclusive letter from Kazuko Hosoki's father	Weekly Gendai	2006年5月20日 - 8月19・26日号
Writing	米山勝弘	「豪憲君's father's exclusive letter	Weekly Shincho	2006 July
Planning	Nishioka Kensuke	JR East's secretly controlled by the Japan Revolutionary Communist League (Revolutionary Marxist Faction)	Weekly Gendai	2006 July - December
Issues		NEWS23 Mona Yamamoto's affair with married Yomiuri Giants player Tomohiro Nioka	Friday	2006 October
2008
Grand Prize		Asashōryū Akinori's sumo match fixing	Weekly Gendai	2007 February, and on
Grand Prize		Exposure of "natto diet" scam on national television (article caused a large scandal)	Weekly Asahi	2007 January, and on
Issues		Yumiko Himei's 6-year-long affair	Weekly Bunshun	2007 September
Issues		Celebrity tells all about her divorce with sumo wrestler Wakanohana Masaru	Women's Seven	2007 October
Scoop		Why a defense minister got skipped over in the cabinet reshuffle	Weekly Post	2007 September
Writing	Mori Isao	Revolving door between justice system and private lawyers	Monthly Gendai	2007 October - 2008 May
Planning		Yoshimoto Kogyo's ties to the yakuza	Weekly Shincho	2007 April, and on
2009
Grand Prize		Mona Yamamoto's affair	Women's Seven	2008 July
Grand Prize	Itou Shunya	How a 36-year-old pregnant woman's body got lost in the streets	Weekly Bunshun	2008 October
Scoop		Akihabara massacre: confession from suspect's brother	Weekly Gendai	2008 June
Scoop		Spotted at a yakuza's birthday party: Takashi Hosokawa, Akira Kobayashi, and more	Weekly Shincho	2008 October
Issues		Mizuho Corporate Bank president's adultery	Friday	2008 August
Issues		Adult film star Minako Komukai's prostitution	Weekly Post	2008 November
Writing	Mori Isao	The Bank of Tokyo-Mitsubishi UFJ and burakumin	Monthly Gendai	2008 November
Photography		Ai Fukuhara and Kei Nishikori's secret romance	Friday	2008 December
2010				Source
Grand Prize		Yoshitada Konoike's secret weekend affair (an exposé which caused the politician to enter a mental hospital)	Weekly Shincho	2009 May
Issues		Television announcer Natsume Miku's naughty photos	FLASH	2009 July
Issues		When politician Tanaka Mieko was a "cosplay reporter"	FRIDAY	2009 September
Work		Ichirō Ozawa's bribery scandal—a secret financial world revealed	Weekly Gendai	2009 March, and on
Scoop		Shigeo Nagashima's son Kazushige Nagashima wrecks his father's heritage	Weekly Post	2009 December
2011				Source
Grand Prize		Sumo giant Kotomitsuki Keiji's expensive secrecy pact	週刊新潮	2010年5月27日号
Scoop		Arashi fan's "confession"	週刊文春	2010年11月11日号
Scoop		Hiroshi Nakai and his favorite hostess bar	週刊新潮	2010年4月1日号
Writing	ja:村木厚子 江川紹子	Muraki Atsuko's misuse of funds for handicapped	文藝春秋	2010 October
Writing	Shimizu Kiyoshi	Ashikaga murder case: an innocent man, 17 years in prison	文藝春秋	2010 October
Issues		AKB48 Sayaka Akimoto's "home date" with a 56-year-old man	Weekly Bunshun	2010 October
Issues		Ai Aoki's adulterous date	Weekly Shincho	2010 September
Photography		Kiyoshi Hikawa's nighttime date	FRIDAY	2010年7月30日号
2012				Source
Grand prize	Uehara Yoshihiro	Investigative biography of Tōru Hashimoto	Shincho 45	2011 November
Grand prize	Yamaguchi Yoshimasa	Olympus scandal series	FACTA	2011 August - 2012
Scoop		Nuclear spokesman Nishiyama Hidehiko's use of prostitutes	Weekly Shincho	2011 June
Scoop		Golfer Ryo Ishikawa stays at engaged woman's house	女性セブン	2011 November
Writing	Sano Shin'ichi	Biography of Masayoshi Son	週刊ポスト	2011 January - September
Issues		Celebrity Yōsui Inoue's adultery	Bunshun	2011 July
Issues		Celebrity Shinsuke Shimada's "black cell phone" and organized crime	Weekly Asahi	2011 September
Photography		Politician Masazumi Gotoda's adulterous practices	FRIDAY	2011年6月17日号
Special Award: Earthquake/Nuclear Issues	Ishii Kouta	Special report: Recovering bodies from the tsunami areas	Shincho 45	2011 June–July
2013				Source
Grand Prize	松田賢弥	Ichirō Ozawa's wife's divorce papers	Weekly Bunshun	2012 June
Scoop		Tatsunori Hara pays off a yakuza boss	Weekly Bunshun	2012 June
Scoop		Hashimoto Toru gropes a stewardess	Weekly Bunshun	2012 July
Scoop		Celebrity's reliance on his mother	Women's Seven	2012 April
Writing	五味洋治	E-mails from Kim Jong-nam	Bunshun	2012 March
Writing	岩井克己	Interview with Emperor of Japan's former physician	Bunshun	2012 August
Issues		Atsuko Maeda carried home at night by a Ruroni Kenshin actor	Bunshun	2012 September
Photography		Politician Tanaka Mieko's scandalous adultery	Weekly Shincho	2012 June
2014				Source:
Grand Prize		CHAGE and ASKA - ASKA blackmailed by yakuza after being caught doing meth on camera!	Weekly Bunshun	2013 August
Scoop		Mari Yaguchi's adultery in front of her husband	Weekly Woman	2013 June
Scoop		We name the Kyodo News director who invited a college student to spend a night with him	Weekly Bunshun	2013 May
Issues		AKB's Minami Minegishi and EXILE's Alan Shirahama go at it!	Weekly Bunshun	2013 February
Issues		Mysterious letters from a murder suspect	Josei Jishin	2013 October
Writing	Takeo Noguchi	Is the "deaf genius composer" Mamoru Samuragochi for real?	Shincho 45	2013 November
Planning	奥野修司 他	Exposé of high levels of poisonous toxins in Chinese meat used at McDonald's in Japan	Weekly Bunshun	2013 March
Planning		Letters from every prisoner on death row	Weekly Post	2013 February
Photography		Scoop! Princess Kako of Akishino's lavish night out in Kabukicho	FLASH	2013 April
2015				Source:
Grand Prize	Koyama Norio	The deaf composer was a charlatan!	Weekly Bunshun	2014 February
Scoop		Yūko Obuchi's "political funds" by the Minister of Economy, Trade and Industry	Weekly Shincho	2014 October
Scoop		Real name accusation against the representative of Your Party who hid $8 million in debt Farewell politician Yoshimi Watanabe and representative DHC chairman Yoshiaki Yoshida exclusive memo	Weekly Shincho	2014 April
Issues		Makiko Esumi's "stupid son" and Kazushige Nagashima's house with graffiti	Weekly Bunshun	2014 September
Issues		Exclusive scoop: The reason why Miss Toyo Eiwa canceled NTV's "women's announcer job offer"	Weekly Gendai	2014 November
Writing	Ryutaro Nakamura	ASKA is arrested!	Weekly Bunshun	2014 May
Writing	Ryusho Kadota	Asahi Shimbun's Yoshida Report scoop is the same as military comfort women false report	Weekly Post	2014 June
Photography		Daisuke Takahashi is forcibly kissing with Seiko Hashimoto	Weekly Bunshun	2014 August
Photography		Scoop: Karina's origin of the “free-spirited” love with him who is rumored to be from Taiwan	FRIDAY	2014 April
2016				Source:
Grand Prize		Mary Kitagawa's angry monologue for 5 hours	Weekly Bunshun	2015 January
Scoop		"Takaya Mutō made me a slave in the legislator's dormitory" Other reports on Takaya Mutō	Weekly Bunshun	2015 September
Scoop		The site of the affair of Parliamentary Vice-Minister of Agriculture and Fisheries, Yūko Nakagawa, who kissed her on the night of her resignation as Minister of Agriculture, Forestry and Fisheries	Weekly Shincho	2015 March
Issues		"Underwear thief" The qualities of Tsuyoshi Takagi in his promotion to minister - Other reports on Tsuyoshi Takagi	Weekly Shincho	2015 October
Issues		Cohabitation love in full bloom between Norika Fujiwara and Kataoka Ainosuke VI	Josei Jishin	2015 June
Writing		Ken Takakura's final memoirs	Bungeishunjū	2015 January
Writing	Masumi Fukuda	Monster Mother Maruko Business High School bullying suicide case in Maruko, Nagano	Shincho 45	2015 January - May
Planning		An employee makes a death-defying accusation in this magazine, the origin of corrosion, and other reports surrounding Toshiba's series of fraudulent accounting	Nikkei Business	2015 August
Photography		These two were really good! "Holding hands with sunglasses, wish!" Keiko Kitagawa and DAIGO hot secret meeting and a stay at a mansion	FRIDAY	2015 January
2017				Source:
Grand Prize		31 year-old Becky's forbidden love: Her partner is a singer who is making his first appearance at Kōhaku Uta Gassen	Weekly Bunshun	2016 January
Scoop		"I gave a bribe of 12 million yen to Akira Amari's office" real name accusation	Weekly Bunshun	2016 January
Scoop		Exclusive scoop! Hiroki Narimiya cocaine sucking suspicion site photo!	FRIDAY	2016 December
Issues		Commuting to hot spring villas every weekend in Governor of Tokyo Yōichi Masuzoe's official car	Weekly Bunshun	2016 May
Issues		Kensuke Miyazaki, a parliamentarian on maternity leave's "guess affair" photo (article which led to his resignation)	Weekly Bunshun	2016 February
Issues		Unsatisfied with monogamy, affair with five Ototake-kuns	Weekly Shincho	2016 March
Writing	Kenichi Dokoi	Junichiro Koizumi's monologue	Bungeishunjū	2016 January
Writing	Masuo Yokota	Uniqlo one year infiltration	Weekly Bunshun	2016 December
Photography		40-something Yō Yoshida love affair is 7 consecutive nights of eating meat with the strongest idol who is 20 years younger than her!	Weekly Post	2016 April
2018				Source:
Grand Prize		A series of reports about the female representative: The brutality of Mayuko Toyota, a member of the House of Representatives	Weekly Shincho	2017 June
Grand Prize		Princess Mako's "mother-in-law" debt has more than $40,000	Weekly Woman	2017 December
Scoop		Victim woman accuses! A series of reports on Prime Minister Abe's quasi-rape arrest warrant and former TBS reporter Noriyuki Yamaguchi, which was crushed by the Chief of Criminal Affairs Department of the Tokyo Metropolitan Police Department	Weekly Shincho	2017 May
Scoop		Shocking confession by brother of Takako Uehara's husband who committed suicide "At the end of a fatal affair"	Woman Seven	2017 August
Scoop		Shiori Yamao's forbidden love with handsome lawyer	Weekly Bunshun	2017 September
Issues	Isao Mori	Pursuing a series of Kake Gakuen scandals	Bungeishunjū	2017 May, July - September
Writing	Taeko Ishii	Yuriko Koike's research shouldering the work of her father	Shincho 45	2017 January
Writing		One-hit wonder entertainer biographies	Shincho 45	2017 January - December
Photography		All photos of 11 days of passionate pursuit between Sho Sakurai from Arashi and TV Asahi announcer Ayaka Ogawa	Weekly Post	2017 March
Photography		A series of reports on House of Councillors member Eriko Imai's adultery with Kobe City Council member Ken Hashimoto	Weekly Shincho	2017 August
2019				Source:
Grand Prize		Moritomo Gakuen in crisis! Sexual harassment sound source of the worthless Vice Minister of Finance and a series of investigation campaign articles	Weekly Shincho	2018 April
Scoop		Emperor is trying to destroy Yasukuni. Yasukuni Shrine top imperial criticism ripples	Weekly Post	2018 October
Scoop		Obtained documentary evidence! Minister Satsuki Katayama has $10,000 with national tax	Weekly Bunshun	2018 October
Issues		"Itte Q!" has completed Daisuke Miyagawa's "Festival" project	Weekly Bunshun	2018 November
Issues		Kaori Icho's heartbreaking confession: Insidious power harassment from her former teacher Kazuhito Sakae	Weekly Bunshun	2018 March
Writing	Taeko Ishii	Yuriko Koike's fake resume	Bungeishunjū	2018 July
Writing	Tomohiko Suzuki	"Infiltration report Toyosu and Yakuza" and a series of articles related to "Fish and Yakuza"	Weekly Post	2018 October
Photography		Hitomi Yoshizawa hit-and-run video recorded on drive recorder (an exposé which caused the celeb to retire)	FRIDAY	2018 September
Digital Awards		Waseda University professor excessive courtship sexual harassment	President Online	2018 June
Digital Awards		Princess Mako and Kei Komuro's engagement event to be postponed until next year	News Post Seven	2018 February
2020				Source:
Grand Prize		Hiroyuki Miyasako and other popular entertainers of Yoshimoto Kogyo are reported on a series of "dark business" by criminal groups	FRIDAY	2019 June
Scoop		Advisor to Prime Minister Abe and a beautiful bureaucrat intimidated Professor Shinya Yamanaka on an affair trip to Kyoto	Weekly Bunshun	2018 December
Scoop		Illegal acquisition of Miss Warbler by Minister of Justice Katsuyuki Kawai (an exposé which caused the politician to be imprisoned)	Weekly Bunshun	2019 November
Issues	Eiji Tamura	Accusing Ryuichi Hirokawa, a world-famous human rights journalist, of sexual violence	Weekly Bunshun	2019 January
Issues	Greg Kelly	3 hours of exclusive confession: Hiroto Nishikawa is not qualified to be the president of Nissan	Bungeishunjū	2019 July
Issues		Confession of Super Free culprit, Shinichiro Wada	Weekly Shincho	2019 February
Writing	Satoru Ishido	Naoki Hyakuta phenomenon	Newsweek Japan edition	2019 June
Writing	Masuo Yokota	Infiltration report: Amazon desperation warehouse	Weekly Post	2019 August - September
Photography		Ministry Isshu Sugawara's voters buyout	Weekly Bunshun	2019 October
Digital Awards	Makoto Okano	Verification: Yasutaro Matsuki "It's a good ball!" Is it really a good ball?	News Post Seven	2019 February
Digital Awards		Obituary: "Last words" that the cram school teacher "Kinpika-sensei" told only to us "Because there is no meaning even if you are alive"	Gendai Business	2019 September
2021				Source:
Grand Prize		Prosecutor Kurokawa from Tokyo High Public Prosecutor's Office is a habitual offender of mahjong gambling on entertainment Scoop shots from the scene	Weekly Bunshun	May 2020
Scoop		Moritomo suicide - Ministry of Finance official full text of suicide note released "Everything is directed by Director Sagawa"	Weekly Bunshun	March 2020
Scoop		"Kei Komuro's mother's ex-fiancé" monologue: "I will tell Princess Mako. I don't need the money ($35,000) anymore"	Weekly Gendai	December 2020
Issues		Nozomi Sasaki's frenzy: Ken Watabe's "Take out affair"	Weekly Bunshun	June 2020
Issues		Early afternoon "love hotel secret meeting" Daiya Seto "winning meal" dedication betrayal to "beautiful wife"	Weekly Shincho	October 2020
Issues		Anne's divorce crisis, Masahiro Higashide's "Underage adultery" (an exposé which caused the couple to divorce)	Weekly Bunshun	January 2020
Writing	Tadahira Suzuki	The most hated director	Weekly Bunshun	August 2020
Photography		Ruriko Kojima: The Kingdom Manga artist and Fukuoka "Love for matchmaking"	Weekly Post	August 2020
Digital Awards		Do it quickly: Avex chairman Matsuura's "cannabis pickled" trip to Hawaii Released "evidence audio" at a chalk mansion	Bunshun Online	August 2020
2022				Source:
Grand Prize		Prime Minister Yoshihide Suga's eldest son's illegal entertainment of high-ranking government officials	Weekly Bunshun	February 2021
Scoop		Sayaka Kanda's 'suicide note' dating actor and feud	Weekly Bunshun	December 2021
Scoop		"Naomi Watanabe is Olympig": The person in charge of the Olympics opening ceremony accused of "disrespecting women" (an exposé which caused the concerned person to resign)	Weekly Bunshun	March 2021
Issues		Taro Aso's closest aide, former minister Jun Matsumoto is absorbed in "Italian Ginza"	Weekly Shincho	February 2021
Issues		"Two women" that Ichikawa Ebizo spent at a hotel in Yonago, Kurashiki	Weekly Post	October 2021
Photography		Scoop! Ai Fukuhara left her husband and child in Taiwan and went home and had an affair	Woman Seven	March 2021
Writing	Kei Nakamura	Laughing God M-1, its naivety and madness	Weekly Bunshun	November 2021
Writing	Ippo Nakahara	Verification: Keigo Oyamada incident	Weekly Bunshun e-edition	October 2021
Digital Awards		A mother's tearful confession: "My daughter's body was frozen" A 14-year-old girl froze to death in Asahikawa at -17°C.	Bunshun Online	April 2021
Digital Awards		Scoop shot: Mizutamari Bond, Ayanan, Comdot … 31 super popular YouTubers under the declaration of emergency “Self-restraint breaking big party” “Drunken karaoke until 3 a.m.”	Bunshun Online	June 2021
Digital Awards		Anonymous account attacking the opposition party on Twitter ... The identity was a "corporation"	FRIDAY Digital	October 2021
