= Variable Control Voice Actuator =

The term Variable Control Voice Actuator (VCVA) refers to a digital recording technology developed by Olympus, which is implemented in many of their digital voice recorders. It prevents the recording of silence, so pauses in a speaker's dictation do not waste time, power or recording space.

== Function ==
When the microphone picks up an arbitrary level of sound, the VCVA initiates recording, and when volume detected by that microphone dips down below said threshold the VCVA stops recording.
