= Olympus Chrome Six =

The Olympus Chrome Six is a series of folding cameras made by Takachiho and later Olympus from 1948 to 1956, for 6×4.5 or 6×6 exposures on 120 film.

In 1948, Olympus launched the Chrome Six I, an updated version of the Olympus Six of 1940 and its first postwar release of a folding camera for 120 film. The cameras were produced at the Suwa Plant in Nagano Prefecture. They were packaged and shipped on the same day to camera stores in Tokyo.

In 1951 Olympus launched the Olympus Chrome Six IIIA, a successor to the Olympus Chrome Six I. The camera had a film tensioner which held the film flat against the pressure plate, the first implementation of this feature. The Olympus Chrome Six RIIA was launched four years later in 1955. It had a high-precision rangefinder (not coupled with the lens), and was the most advanced camera of the series.
