= Hollywood accounting =

Opaque or creative accounting methods

Hollywood accounting (also known as Hollywood bookkeeping) is the opaque or "creative" set of accounting methods used by the film, video, television and music industry to budget and record profits for creative projects. Expenditures can be inflated to reduce or eliminate the reported profit of the project, thereby reducing the amount which the corporation must pay in taxes and royalties or other profit-sharing agreements, as these are based on net profit.

Hollywood accounting gets its name from its prevalence in the entertainment industry—that is, in the movie studios of Hollywood at a time when most studios were located in Hollywood. Those affected can include writers and actors, but also production companies, producers and investors. A number of cases of Hollywood accounting have been successfully pursued in court and have resulted in hundreds of millions of dollars in awarded damages.

== Practices ==
"Everyone who can help make a big successful picture now wants a share of the profits", Eric Hodgins wrote in 1957 while discussing post-studio system Hollywood: "'We're running into a new trouble now,' said one harassed producer. 'There's only 100% to give away.'" Thus,

"working for nothing" (i.e., not for salary but for profit sharing) has become a hallmark of the highest status among stars ... The trading demands of first-magnitude stars today are simple and breathtaking: 50% of the profits (usually with a minimum guarantee) or 10% of the gross.

"These demands are met without an audible whimper" however, he wrote:

Horrible though 50% of the profits seems, most studios prefer it to 10% of the gross. After all, you can't split a profit unless there is one, but a deal based on the gross box office receipts means that the star starts getting paid "from the first dollar." That may leave nothing at all for the risk-taker.

Hollywood accounting can take several forms. In one form, a subsidiary is formed to perform a given activity and the parent entity will extract money out of the film's revenue in the form of charges for certain "services". For example, a film studio has a distribution arm as a sub-entity, which will then charge the studio a "distribution fee"—essentially, the studio charging itself a sum it has total control over and hence controlling the profitability report of a project.

Another form of Hollywood accounting is a reverse tobashi scheme, in which the studio unjustly cross-collateralizes the accounting of two projects and shifts losses from a flop onto a profitable project by shifting costs involving internal operations. This way, two unprofitable projects are created out of one on paper alone, primarily for the purpose of eliminating net participation liabilities. The specific schemes can range from the simple and obvious to the extremely complex. Generally, Hollywood accounting uses permanent creative accounting practices (such as charging an arbitrary distribution fee from one sub-entity to another) rather than temporary ones (like the Repo 105 scheme) since the measures are meant to permanently distort the bottom line of a film project.

Three main factors in Hollywood accounting reduce the reported profit of a movie, and all have to do with the calculation of overhead:

- Production overhead: Studios, on average, calculate production overhead by using a figure around 15% of total production costs.
- Distribution overhead: Film distributors typically keep 30% of what they receive from movie theaters ("gross rentals").
- Marketing overhead: To determine this number, studios usually choose about 10% of all advertising costs.

All of the above means of calculating overhead are highly controversial, even within the accounting profession. Namely, these percentages are assigned without much regard to how, in reality, these estimates relate to actual overhead costs. In short, this method does not, by any rational standard, attempt to adequately trace overhead costs.

Because of the studio's ability to place arbitrary charges along the value chain, net participation "points" (a percentage of the net income as opposed to a percentage of the gross income of a film) are sometimes referred to as "monkey points". The term is attributed to Eddie Murphy, who is said to have also stated that only a fool would accept net points in their contract.

Actress Lynda Carter on The Late Show with Joan Rivers commented "Don't ever settle for net profits. It's called 'creative accounting'."

Many insist on "gross points" (a percentage of some definition of gross revenue) rather than net profit participation. This practice reduces the likelihood of a project showing a profit, as a production company will claim a portion of the reported box-office revenue was diverted directly to gross point participants. The studios rarely agree to gross participation, generally only when the person has considerable leverage, such as an A-list star, producer, or director whose participation is vital to the project.

== Examples ==
=== 1980s ===
In 2009, Lucasfilm stated that Return of the Jedi (1983) "has never gone into profit", despite having grossed $572 million worldwide.

Art Buchwald received a settlement from Paramount Pictures after his lawsuit Buchwald v. Paramount (1990). The court found Paramount's actions "unconscionable", noting that it was impossible to believe that Eddie Murphy's 1988 comedy Coming to America, which grossed $288 million, failed to make a profit, especially since the actual production costs were less than a tenth of that. Paramount settled for $900,000, rather than have its accounting methods closely scrutinized.

Michael Uslan and Benjamin Melniker, executive producers of the 1989 film Batman, filed a breach of contract lawsuit against Warner Bros. and producers Jon Peters and Peter Guber in Los Angeles County Superior Court on March 26, 1992. Uslan and Melniker claimed to be "the victims of a sinister campaign of fraud and coercion that has cheated them out of continuing involvement in the production of the 1989 film Batman and its sequels. We were denied proper credits, and deprived of any financial rewards for our indispensable creative contribution to the success of Batman." A superior court judge rejected the lawsuit. Total revenues of Batman have topped $2 billion, with Uslan claiming to have "not seen a penny more than that since our net profit participation has proved worthless". Warner Bros. offered the pair an out-of-court pay-off, a sum described by Uslan and Melniker's attorney as "two popcorns and two Cokes".

=== 1990s ===
Winston Groom's price for the screenplay rights to his 1986 novel Forrest Gump included a 3% share of the profits; however, due to Hollywood accounting, the 1994 film's commercial success was converted into a net loss, and Groom received only $350,000 for the rights and an additional $250,000 from Paramount.

According to screenwriter Ed Solomon, Sony claims Men in Black, a 1997 film he wrote, has never broken even, despite grossing nearly $600 million against a $90 million budget.

=== 2000s ===
Gone in 60 Seconds (2000) grossed $240 million at the box office, but The Walt Disney Company declared a $212 million loss, primarily through Hollywood accounting as explained on NPR. The real figure is likely closer to $90 million.

Stan Lee, co-creator of the character Spider-Man, had a contract awarding him 10% of the net profits of anything based on his characters. The film Spider-Man (2002) made more than $800 million in revenue, but the producers claim that it did not make any profit as defined in Lee's contract, and Lee received nothing. In 2002 he filed a lawsuit against Marvel Comics. The case was settled in January 2005, with Marvel paying $10 million to "finance past and future payments claimed by Mr. Lee".

The 2002 film My Big Fat Greek Wedding was considered hugely successful for an independent film, yet according to the studio, the film lost money. Accordingly, the cast (with the exception of Nia Vardalos who had a separate deal) sued the studio for their part of the profits. The original producers of the film sued Gold Circle Films in 2007 due to Hollywood accounting practices because the studio has claimed the film, which cost less than $6 million to make and made over $350 million at the box office, lost $20 million.

Peter Jackson, director of The Lord of the Rings (2001–2003), and his studio WingNut Films, brought a lawsuit in 2007 against New Line Cinema after an audit. Jackson stated this is regarding "certain accounting practices". In response, New Line stated that their rights to a film of The Hobbit were time-limited, and since Jackson would not work with them again until the suit was settled, he would not be asked to direct The Hobbit, as had been anticipated. Fifteen actors sued New Line Cinema, claiming that they have never received their 5% of revenue from merchandise sold in relation to the movie, which contained their likenesses. Similarly, the Tolkien estate sued New Line, claiming that their contract entitled them to 7.5% of the gross receipts of the $6 billion hit. According to New Line's accounts, the trilogy made "horrendous losses" and no profit at all.

Michael Moore sued Bob and Harvey Weinstein, of Miramax Films, in February 2011, claiming that they had used creative accounting to deprive him of his share of profits for the film Fahrenheit 9/11 (2004). Eventually, Moore reached a settlement with the Weinsteins and the lawsuit was dropped in 2012.

The 2005 film Sahara grossed $119 million against a production budget of $160 million, resulting in a $105 million loss for Paramount Pictures. However, due to Hollywood accounting tactics, the loss was only reported as $78.3 million.

=== 2010s ===
A Warner Bros. receipt was leaked online in 2010, showing that the hugely successful movie Harry Potter and the Order of the Phoenix (2007) ended up with a $167 million loss on paper after grossing nearly $1 billion. This is especially egregious given that, without inflation adjustment, the Wizarding World film series is one of the highest-grossing film series of all time both domestically and internationally. The Hollywood accounting in the Harry Potter case included a $60 million interest charge on a $400 million budget over two years – an interest rate far higher than industry standard – as well as high distribution and advertising fees paid out to Warner Bros. subsidiaries and sister companies.

The Walt Disney Company lost a $270 million lawsuit in 2010 to Celador over accounting tricks used to mask profits on the Who Wants to Be a Millionaire (1999–2007) licensed franchise in the United States: "ABC artificially deflated fees the network should have paid the production company BVT and Disney-owned Valleycrest, which in turn decreased Celador's share of revenue. Loss of merchandising revenue was also claimed."

Don Johnson won a lawsuit in 2010 against Rysher Entertainment which had attempted to wipe profits for the show Nash Bridges (1996–2001) off the books to reduce Johnson's 50% backend stake to zero; the jury awarded Johnson $23.2 million in damages.

21st Century Fox was found guilty of using Hollywood accounting practices to defraud the producers and stars of the procedural drama Bones (2005–2017) and ordered to pay $179 million in missing profits, with the arbitration ruling made public in 2019. Fox subsequently contested the $128 million punitive damages component in Los Angeles County Superior Court, whereas it declared it would pay the $51 million in actual damages awarded by the arbitrator. In September 2019, the lawsuit was settled on confidential terms.

Despite grossing $911 million against its $55 million budget, 20th Century Fox wrote down the 2018 Freddie Mercury biopic Bohemian Rhapsody as a $51 million loss.

Despite grossing $153 million against a $26 million budget, the 2019 romantic comedy Yesterday reportedly lost $87.8 million, according to Universal Pictures accounting sheets.

=== 2020s ===
In July 2021, a lawsuit brought by developer and executive producer Frank Darabont along with Creative Artists Agency against AMC Networks over profits from TV series The Walking Dead was settled for $200 million, plus sharing of certain future revenues. The plaintiffs had alleged that AMC had deliberately set the imputed fees "paid" by the eponymous AMC Networks cable TV channel to AMC Studios – both subsidiaries of AMC Networks – far below fair market value, and thus illegitimately curtailed the payments due to the plaintiffs under their profit-sharing agreements.

== See also ==
- Creative accounting
- Copyright infringement#Criticism of industry estimates
- Plug (accounting)
- Production accounting
- Tobashi scheme
- WGA screenwriting credit system
