= List of people involved in the Olympus scandal =

A number of individuals whose backgrounds are important to the understanding of the Olympus scandal, which was precipitated on 14 October 2011 when the company's British-born chief executive, Michael Woodford, was suddenly ousted as chief executive of Olympus Corporation. He had been only two weeks into the job when he exposed "one of the biggest and longest-running loss-hiding arrangements in Japanese corporate history", according to The Wall Street Journal. The US$2.2 billion deal in 2008 to acquire British medical equipment maker Gyrus Group, and the US$687 million paid to a middle-man, were questioned. After initial denials, the company admitted that prior acquisitions had been used to cover investment losses. As regulators and police on three continents begin to investigate and trace the movement of the money, there was speculation that organised crime was involved in the missing millions. Olympus defended itself against allegations of impropriety, citing its audit board's view that "no dishonesty or illegality is found in the transaction itself, nor any breach of the obligation to good management or any systematic errors by the directors recognised."

== The whistleblower ==
=== Michael C. Woodford ===
According to the Olympus website, Woodford, a graduate of Millbank College of Commerce, joined KeyMed, a U.K. medical-equipment unit of Olympus, in 1981. He became managing director by the age of 30. In 2008 he became executive managing director of Olympus Europa Holding GmbH and a member of the Olympus board of directors. In February 2011, he was appointed president of Olympus Corporation. On 30 September 2011 Woodford was appointed chief executive officer, the appointment taking effect on 1 October. However, after he started agitating within the top Olympus executives about suspicious acquisitions, he was fired from his position as president and CEO on 14 October 2011; he remained a board director.

== Other Olympus insiders ==
=== Tsuyoshi Kikukawa ===
Kikukawa, Tsuyoshi "Tom" (菊川剛), born on 27 February 1941, was educated at Keio University, where he graduated in Political Science, Dept. of Law in March 1963. His management style is regarded as a 'Western', and is credited with having considerably changed the corporate culture of Olympus.

Kikukawa joined Olympus Optical Co., Ltd. (as Olympus Corporation was then known) in October 1964. In June 1993, he became managing director responsible for Public Relations & Advertising Dept. and DI Project and was made director and member of the main board. Kikukawa spent considerable time in the United States, where he foresaw the demand for the digital SLR. He is credited with the company's strategy in digital photography – he fought for commitment by Olympus to enter the market in high-resolution photographic products. As a result of his efforts, Olympus released an 810,000-pixel digital camera for the mass market in 1996, when the resolution of rivals' offerings was less than half. The very next year, Olympus hit the market with a 1.41 million pixel camera. By 2001, the company's annual turnover from digital photography was in excess of ¥100 billion. In recognition of the success in digital photography that he championed within the firm, Kikukawa was promoted to managing director in 1998 and president in April 2001.

In February 2011, Kikukawa handed the title of president to Michael Woodford, while remaining as board chairman and CEO. Kikukawa remained chairman when Woodford was promoted to CEO on 30 September 2011. Kikukawa re-assumed the titles of president and CEO two weeks later when Woodford was ousted. Kikukawa resigned as chairman, president, and CEO on 26 October 2011. Ahead of the much-awaited board meeting on 25 November, Kikukawa announced his resignation from the board. In 2013, he was sentenced to three years in prison, suspended for 5 years. The lenient sentence was because Kikukawa was not shown to have initiated or personally benefited from the scheme.

=== Shuichi Takayama ===
Takayama, Shuichi Ph.D. (高山修一) became the chief executive officer and president of Olympus Corporation on the resignation of Tsuyoshi Kikukawa as a result of the Olympus scandal and occupied executive or directorate-level positions in other Olympus subsidiaries. He joined the Company in April 1970 and previously served as director of human resources, managing executive officer, senior managing executive officer and manager of Life & Industrial System Company He resigned all his positions and left the company at an extraordinary general meeting in April 2012

=== Hisashi Mori ===
Mori, Hisashi (森 久志) was executive vice president of Olympus Corporation until his resignation in November 2011. Mori joined Olympus in April 1981. He became general manager of, Finance Division in July 2001, and headed General Corporate Planning Office in April 2002; he was made general manager of Corporate Planning Headquarters at Olympus Corporation in April 2005.

Mori served as a main board director of Olympus Corporation from June 2006 until his resignation in November 2011 due to the scandal. Mr. Mori served as a part-time director of ITX Corporation from June 2003 to June 2005, and was its full-time director since June 2007. In 2013, he was sentenced to 2.5 years in prison, suspended for 4 years.

=== Hideo Yamada ===
Yamada, Hideo (山田秀雄) was Executive Managing Officer and Executive Officer of Olympus. He was a Standing Corporate Auditor of Olympus Corporation until November 2011. Yamada, who enjoyed observer status on the board, resigned. In 2013, he was sentenced to 3 years in prison, suspended for 5 years.

== Third parties ==
=== Hajime Sagawa ===
Sagawa, Hajime "Jim" (佐川 肇) is a graduate of Keio University.

In 1978, he met his future wife in Tokyo, where she was teaching English and met him when she went to a concert where his band was playing; at the time he worked at Nomura Research Institute. They married a year later, and moved to New York soon afterwards. Sagawa worked for four years at Nomura Securities International in the early 1980s; he was employed at Drexel Burnham Lambert, and later became head of mergers and acquisitions at Sanyo Securities America in the 1980s. Sagawa spent six years at Paine Webber from 1991 until he was laid off in 1996, when he cofounded his own brokerage firm, Axes America, in 1997 according to securities filings. SEC filings from 2002 through 2005 show his firm's revenue never exceeded $445,000, all paid by offshore entities owned by the members of Axes. In 2006 Axes signed its first contract with Olympus, and received fees of $3.2 million; fees in 2007 amounted to $7.7 million and $24.2 million in 2008, most of which was from Olympus. Finra records show that Sagawa became sole owner of the firm in 2007.

Sagawa and his wife divorced "by mutual agreement" in early November 2011. Through the divorce settlement, Sagawa received $1.5 million in assets, while his wife received $9.9 million, including the $2.5 million marital home in Boca Raton which was transferred to his wife for $10. After the scandal broke, he vacated a luxury mansion in the Cayman Islands, and his current address is unknown. He was neither indicted nor arrested.

=== Akio Nakagawa ===
Nakagawa, Akio (中川 昭夫) was head of equities at Paine Webber in Japan in the early 1990s. According to former colleagues, he worked in tandem with Hajime Sagawa, and performed "portfolio reshuffling" for his Japanese corporate clients, and had long-standing relationship with Olympus. A former Paine Webber banker attested that Nakagawa and Sagawa were handlers for Olympus, and they made use of Bermuda-based funds valued at "hundreds of millions of dollars" to manage its balance sheet using Japanese accounting loopholes. Nakagawa and Sagawa were also colleagues at Drexel Burnham Lambert and PaineWebber. After Nakagawa left Wall Street firms in 1998, he once again joined with Hajime Sagawa, in Axes America. After the Olympus scandal broke, Nakagawa was traced by Reuters reporters to a "luxury apartment block in Hong Kong". He was neither indicted nor arrested.

=== Akinobu and Nobumasa Yokoo ===
Yokoo, Nobumasa (横尾 宣政) is a former investment banker with Nomura. He and some other Nomura executives were caught up in a racketeering scandal involving a corporate racketeer named Koiki Ryuichi, and was forced to resign in June 1998 after it the affair became public; some Nomura executives were arrested. Having founded Global Company in the late 1990s, Yokoo persuaded Olympus to invest ¥30 billion in their venture capital fund in 2000. He also introduced three small, unprofitable companies in which he was shareholder and executive. News Chef, a maker of microwave cookware, Altis and Humalabo were acquired by Olympus for ¥73.4 billion from Cayman Island-based funds between 2007 and 2010. According to its listing in Japan's corporate registry dated 28 July 2011, Nobumasa is president of Global Chef. He was neither indicted nor arrested.

In 2003, Yokoo Akinobu (横尾 昭信), Nobumasa's older brother, was chief financial officer of ITX, an information technology group Olympus acquired in 2003. Akinobu became a group executive officer after Olympus became majority owners. Akinobu was an Olympus executive officer between 2005 and 2009. He was never on the board. Akinobu is also president of Jalux, a company that provides parts and services to the aviation industry. He was neither indicted nor arrested.
