= Touchwood Pacific Partners =

American film financing limited partnership

Touchwood Pacific Partners I, L.P.
- Type: Limited partnership
- Genre: live action
- Predecessor: Silver Screen Partners
- Founded: October 23, 1990; 35 years ago
- Founder: The Walt Disney Company
- Products: live action films
- Total assets: $600 million (1990)
- Total equity: $191 million (1990)
- Owner: Yamaichi General Finance Co. 50 limited partners

Touchwood Pacific Partners I is an American film financing limited partnership formed by The Walt Disney Company in 1990 for its then three production companies, Walt Disney Pictures, Touchstone Pictures and Hollywood Pictures, but owned by Yamaichi General Finance Co., the general partner and a Yamaichi Securities affiliate, and about 50 limited partners.

The partnership was the first Japanese sourced major film financing for Disney and the largest Japanese financing outside of a outright purchase of a film studio.

== Terms ==
Disney has received better terms with Touchwood than with their previous funding partnerships, Silver Screen. The Partnership offers a lower interest than Silver Screens due to the lower Japanese interest rates in 1990. Also, there are no guarantees regarding the minimum financial performance of the financed films.

Disney's Buena Vista Pictures Distribution receives a 30% fee before any money goes to a Disney—Touchwood joint venture. After the joint venture takes into account third-party participation and residuals, the joint venture pays 42% of the remaining to Buena Vista. If the limited partners do not capture back their initial investment after the last film is release plus 5 years, Disney is required to return only the distribution fees up to the original invested amount. Thus the Disney's limited its potential loss to its printing and advertising expenses which could be from $200 million to $300 million.

== History ==
On October 23, 1990, The Walt Disney Company formed Touchwood Pacific Partners I which would supplant the Silver Screen Partnership series as their movie studios' primary funding source. Animated movies were not included in the slate for Touchwood. Yamaichi General Finance Co. planned to sell $180 million in limited partnerships, but sold in a private placement to about 50 Japanese institutional or private investors in the amount of $191 million. An additional $420 million line of credit was arranged for the partnership with a group of banks led by Citibank and including Fuji Bank Ltd., Long-Term Credit Bank of Japan Ltd., and Manufacturers Hanover Trust Co.

By May 1992, the first ten Touchwood films averaged $31 million at the box office (BO) and a low 2 to 1 revenue-to-cost ratio, compared to a $45 million BO average and 5-to-1 ratio for Disney's 1985 to mid-1990s films. However, some Hollywood executives thought that Disney was issuing weaker films in the spring to leave the summer for high-potential films. The next three films would have to match the 1985–mid-1990s average.
