= Olympus Corporation =

Japanese optics company, founded 1919

- Logo since 2000

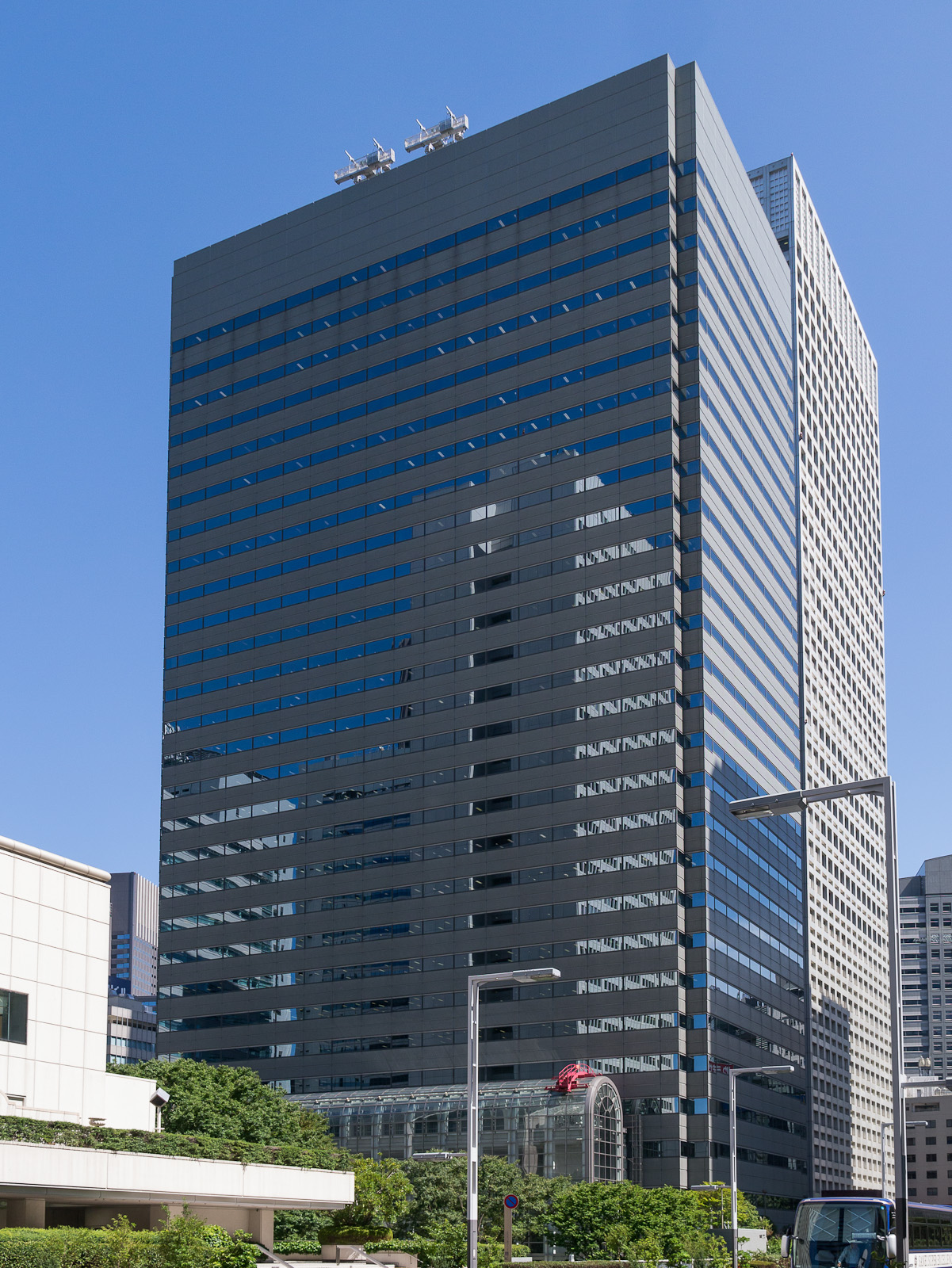
- Olympus Corporation Tokyo Office at the Shinjuku Monolith Building, Nishi-Shinjuku.
- Native name: オリンパス株式会社
- Romanized name: Orinpasu Kabushiki-kaisha
- Formerly: Takachiho Seisakusho (1919-1942), Takachiho Optical Industries (1942-1949), Olympus Optical Co., Ltd (1949-2003), Olympus Corporation (2003-)
- Type: Public
- Traded as: TYO: 7733
- Industry: Electronics
- Founded: 12 October 1919; 107 years ago (as Takachiho Seisakusho); Shinjuku, Tokyo, Japan
- Founder: Takeshi Yamashita
- Headquarters: Hachioji, Tokyo, Japan
- Area served: Worldwide
- Key people: Bob White (president & CEO)
- Products: Precision machinery and instruments; Cameras; Voice recorders; Endoscopes and other medical devices; Face cream; Plastic tableware
- Revenue: ▲¥847,105 million (y/e March 2011)
- Owners: Mitsubishi UFJ Financial Group (4.60%); Sumitomo Mitsui Financial Group (2.44%)
- Number of employees: 31,557 (31 March 2022)
- Website: olympus-global.com

Olympus Corporation is a Japanese manufacturer of optics and reprography products, headquartered in Hachioji, Tokyo. Olympus was founded on October 12, 1919 as Takachiho Seisakusho by Takeshi Yamashita, initially specializing in microscopes and thermometers, and later in imaging. In 1921, the name Olympus was registered as a trademark. In 1942, the company was renamed Takachiho Optical Industries, and in 1949 it was renamed Olympus Optical Co., Ltd. In 2003, the company adopted its current name, Olympus Corporation.

Olympus holds roughly a 70 percent share of the global endoscope market, estimated to be worth approximately US$2.5 billion. As of 2025, endoscopes and related surgical technologies are now Olympus's exclusive product line. It was formerly also a maker of cameras, camera lenses and dictaphones, until it divested this part to OM Digital Solutions in 2020. It divested from its microscopy and scientific imaging division in 2023, selling it to Bain Capital for approximately $3.1 billion; the division operates as Evident Corporation.

In 2011, Olympus attracted worldwide media scrutiny when it fired its CEO Michael Christopher Woodford for whistleblowing, and the matter snowballed into a corporate corruption investigation with multiple arrests. In 2016, it paid US$646 million (equivalent to $848 million in 2025) in fines associated with its illegal, long running, kickback scheme.

== Products ==
=== Cameras and audio ===
In 1936, Olympus introduced its first camera, the Semi-Olympus I, fitted with the first Zuiko-branded lens. The Olympus Chrome Six was a series of folding cameras made by Takachiho, and later Olympus, from 1948 to 1956, for 6×4.5 cm or 6×6 cm exposures on 120 film.

The first innovative camera series from Olympus was the Pen, launched in 1959. It used a half-frame format, taking 72 18×24 mm photographs on a standard 36-exposure 35mm film cassette, which made Pen cameras compact and portable for their time.

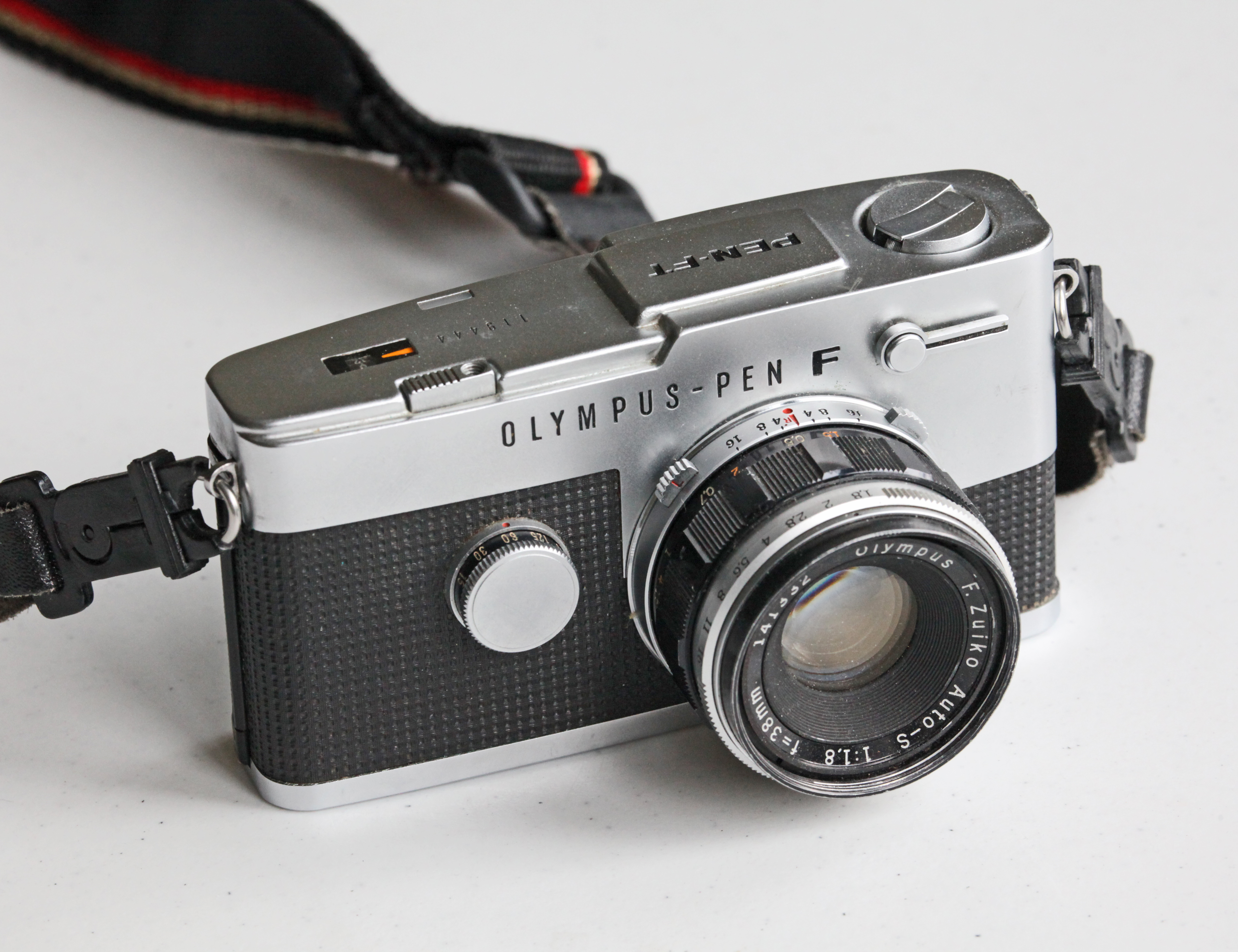
Olympus Pen FT and 38mm f1.8 Zuiko lens

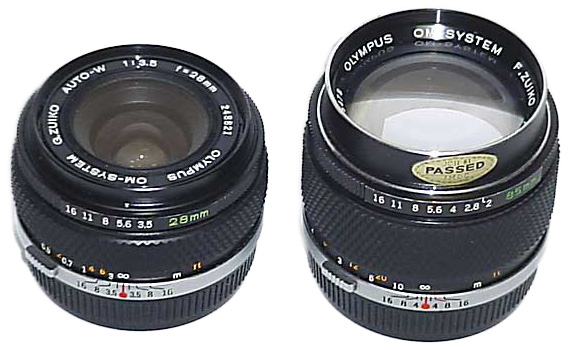
Olympus OM Zuiko lenses

The Pen system design team, led by Yoshihisa Maitani, later created the OM system, a full-frame professional 35mm SLR system designed to compete with Nikon and Canon's bestsellers. The OM system introduced a new trend towards more compact cameras and lenses, being much smaller than its competitors and presenting innovative design features such as off-the-film (OTF) metering and OTF flash automation. Eventually, the system included 14 different bodies, approximately 60 Zuiko-branded lenses, and numerous camera accessories.

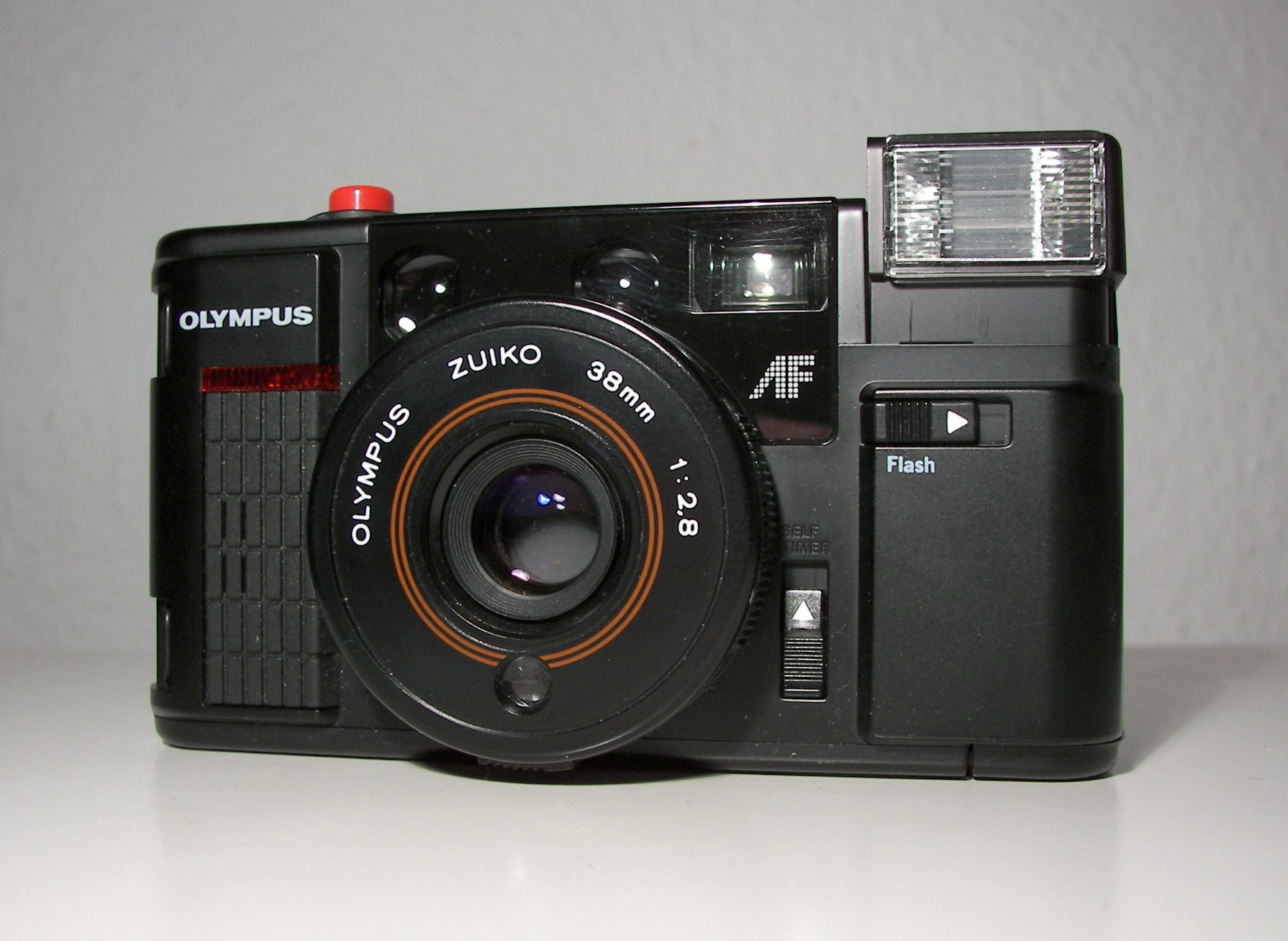
Olympus Quick Flash camera

In 1983, Olympus, along with Canon, branded a range of video recording equipment manufactured by JVC, and called it "Olympus Video Photography", even employing renowned photographer Terance Donovan to promote the range. A second version of the system was available the year after, but this was Olympus's last foray into the world of consumer video equipment until digital cameras became popular.

Tsuyoshi Kikukawa, who was later to become president of Olympus, foresaw the demand for the digital SLR, and is credited with the company's strategy in digital photography. He fought for commitment by Olympus to enter the market in high-resolution photographic products. As a result of his efforts, Olympus released an 810,000-pixel digital camera for the mass market in 1996, when the resolution of rivals' offerings was less than half. The next year, Olympus hit the market with a 1.41 million pixel camera. By 2001, the company's annual turnover from digital photography was in excess of ¥100 billion. Olympus manufactures compact digital cameras and is the designer of the Four Thirds system standard for digital single-lens reflex cameras. Olympus's Four Thirds system flagship DSLR camera was the E-5, released in 2010. Olympus is also the largest manufacturer of Four Thirds lenses, under the Zuiko Digital brand. After the introduction of the Micro Four Thirds system, and the general market growth of the Mirrorless Interchangeable Lens Cameras, the regular Four Thirds system became neglected. Then, in 2017, after three years without a new lens, and seven years without a new body, Olympus officially discontinued the Four Thirds system

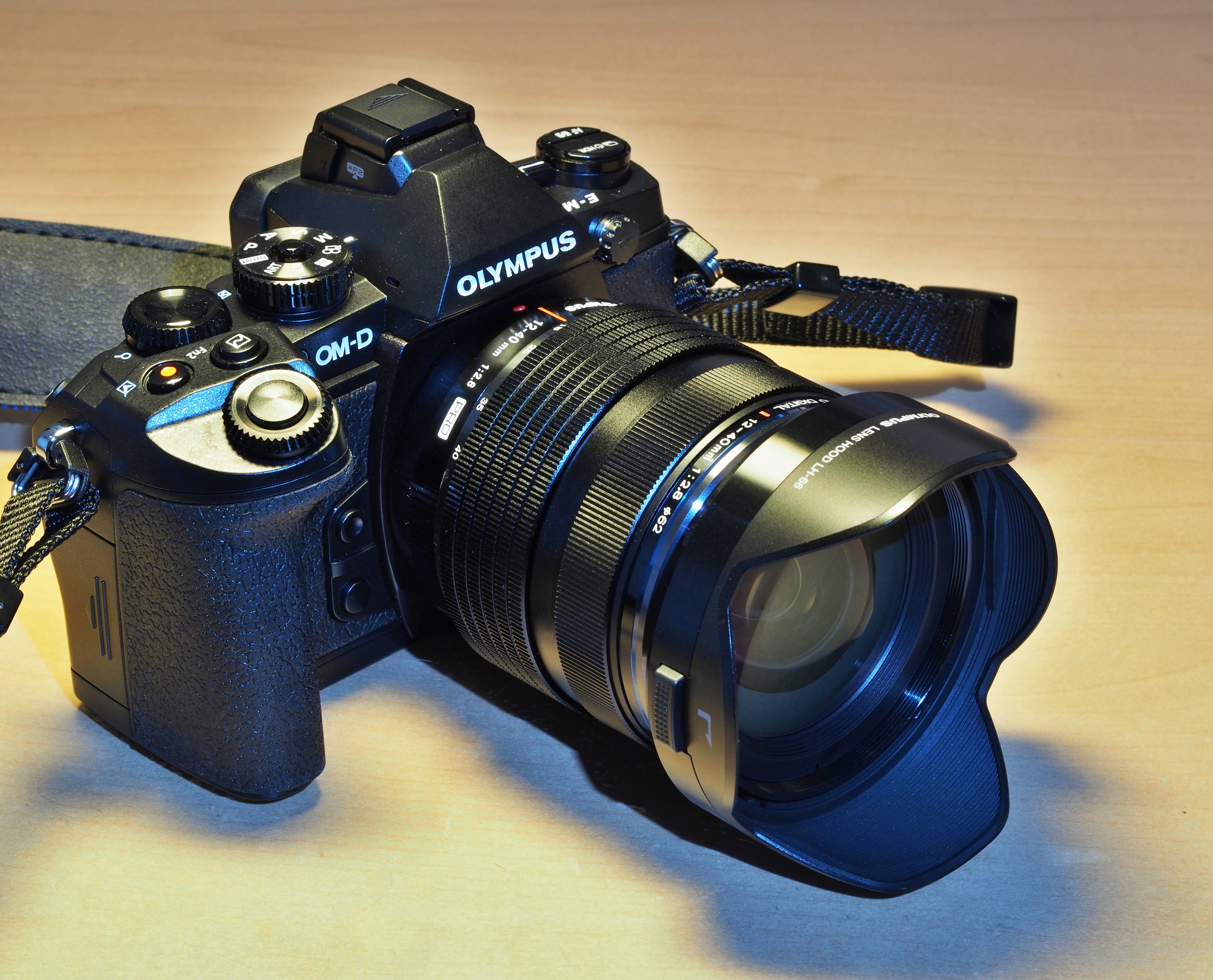
Olympus OM-D E-M1 with an Olympus M.Zuiko Pro 12-40mm f2.8 lens

Olympus and Panasonic started a new development together, called the Micro Four Thirds system. It is an interchangeable lens system, with the Four Thirds sensor size, and no mirrors (Mirrorless Interchangeable Lens Camera). The lack of mirrors allowed the camera body to be a lot smaller than that of a DSLR, while maintaining its image quality and the interchangeability of the lenses. The first product in the Micro Four Thirds system was the Panasonic Lumix DMC-G1, released in 2008. The first Olympus-branded MFT camera was the Olympus PEN E-P1. Because it was very expensive, it made a cheaper option, called the Olympus PEN Lite E-PL1. The market growth of the MILC cameras made Olympus introduce a new series in its lineup, which was the modern, digital implementation of the legendary OM series, the OM-D. It maintained the Micro Four Thirds system, but added a built-in electronic viewfinder, a more ergonomic button layout packaged in a retro style chassis. The first model in this family was the E-M5, released in 2012. Since then, Olympus has developed its two lines (PEN and OM-D) and the Micro Four Thirds system, still alongside Panasonic. The latest Olympus camera is the Olympus OM-D E-M10 Mark IV as of 20 August 2020.

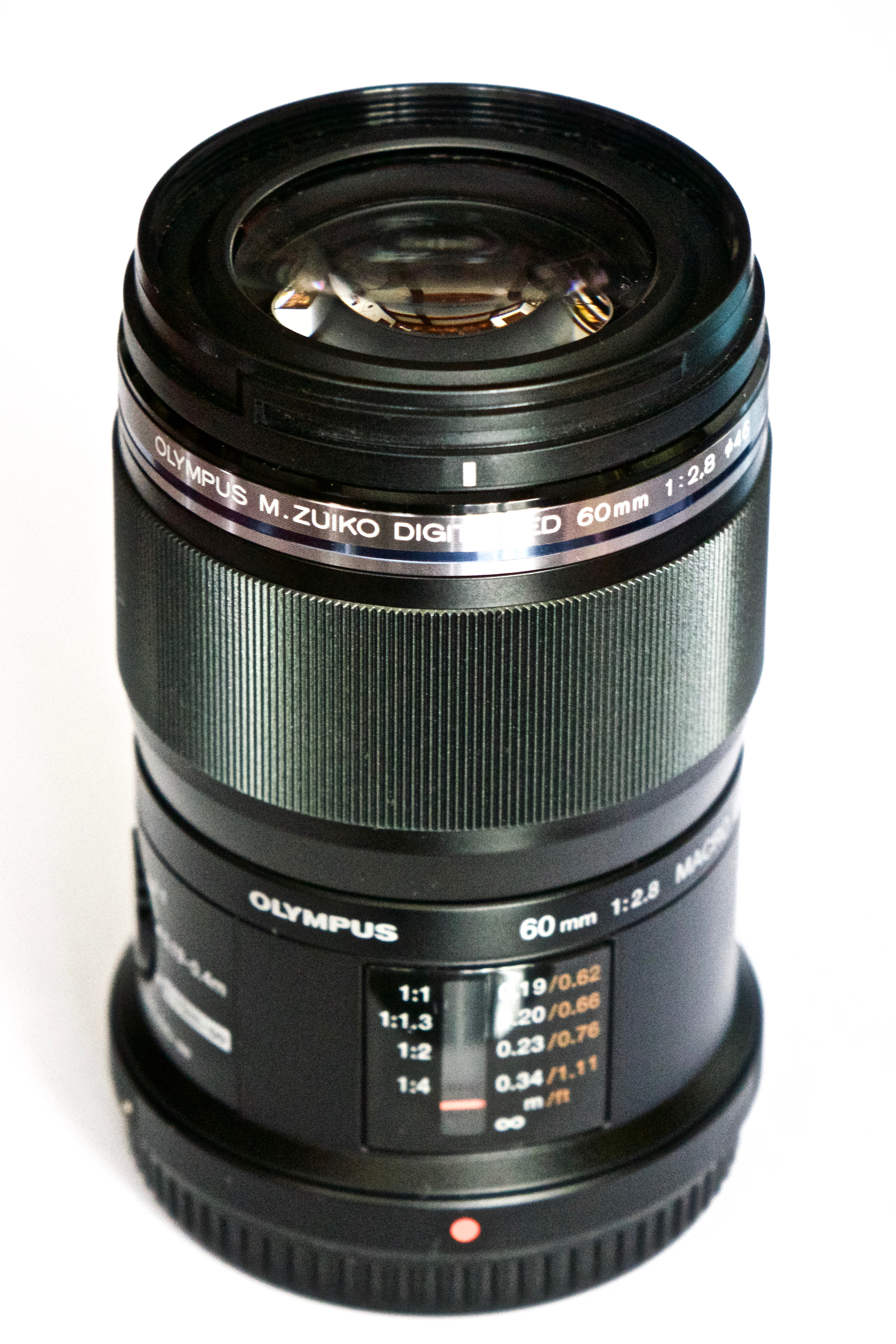
Olympus M.Zuiko Digital ED 60mm f/2.8 Macro Lens

At one time, Olympus cameras used only the proprietary xD-Picture Card for storage media. This storage solution is less popular than more common formats, and recent cameras can use SD and CompactFlash cards. The most recent development is Olympus's focus on the Micro Four Thirds system. Olympus has also been using special proprietary USB cables, such as the CB-USB8, instead of following standards.

Olympus first introduced the Microcassette. The Olympus Pearlcorder L400, released in the 1980s, was the smallest and lightest microcassette voice recorder ever offered for sale, 2.9 (L) × 0.8 (H) × 2.0 in. (W) / 73 (L) × 20 (H) × 52 (W) 3.2 oz (91 g).

In 2012, the company announced that Sony and Fujifilm had offered forming a capital alliance and the company would focus on Mirrorless interchangeable-lens cameras (MILC).

In 2020, Olympus announced that the camera department would be sold to Japan Industrial Partners at the end of the year. In October 2020, Olympus transferred its Imaging division to the newly established OM Digital Solutions. On 1 January 2021, 95% of the shares in OM Digital Solutions were transferred to OJ Holdings, Ltd, a specially established subsidiary of Japan Industrial Partners. Olympus retained ownership of the remaining 5%.

=== Medical and surgical ===
Olympus manufactures endoscopic, ultrasound, electrocautery, endotherapy, and cleaning and disinfection equipment. The first flexible endoscope in the world was co-developed and manufactured by Olympus in Tokyo. In 1987, KeyMed Medical & Industrial Equipment, a British manufacturer was purchased. With a comprehensive product range, Olympus accounts for a large share of the world market in gastrointestinal endoscopes. It has roughly 70% share of the global market which is estimated valued at US$2.5 billion. On 28 September 2012, Olympus and Sony announced that the two companies will establish a joint venture—Sony Olympus Medical Solutions Inc—to develop new surgical endoscopes with 4K resolution (or higher) and 3D capability. On 16 September 2015, Sony Olympus Medical Solutions Inc announced that their jointly developed 4K surgical endoscopy system would be commercialized and made available for purchase in early October 2015, and would be sold by Olympus under the brand name "VISERA 4K UHD".

Olympus has acquired the Israeli medical device company Medi-Tate, a move aimed at enhancing its portfolio in the treatment of benign prostatic hyperplasia (BPH). The acquisition, finalized in February 2021, strengthens Olympus' position in the urological devices market.

Medi-Tate specializes in the research, development, manufacturing, and sale of devices designed for minimally invasive treatment of BPH. Its flagship product, the iTind, is a temporarily implanted nitinol device that alleviates lower urinary tract symptoms (LUTS) associated with BPH. The iTind procedure can be performed by a urologist in various settings, including outpatient hospital facilities, ambulatory surgery centers, or a doctor's office. The device works by gradually expanding and applying gentle pressure at three specific points, reshaping the prostatic urethra and the bladder neck to provide symptom relief.

On 14 September 2022, Sony Olympus Medical Solutions Inc announced that it developed a new model of its 4K surgical endoscopy system, which also allows for Infared imaging and Narrow Band imaging. This new model was made available for purchase in September 2022 by Olympus in Europe, Middle East, Africa, and parts of Asia, Oceania and Japan under the name "VISERA ELITE III". On 15 January 2024, Canon Medical Systems Corporation and Olympus Corporation announced that they reached an agreement to collaborate on a jointly developed Endoscopic Ultrasound System (EUS) that takes advantage of both companies’ experience in endoscopy and sonography.

In October 2026, the US Food and Drug Administration imposed import restrictions on certain medical devices manufactured at Olympus's Hinode, Shirakawa and Aomori facilities, citing unresolved violations of quality system regulations.

=== Scientific ===
Since the beginning, the company has been a manufacturer of microscopes and optics for specialised needs, such as medical use. The first microscope manufactured at Olympus was called the Asahi. Currently, Olympus is a worldwide manufacturer of microscopes. Olympus offers a range of microscopes, which covers applications from education and routine studies up to research imaging systems, both in life science and materials science.

Olympus Scientific Solutions Americas Corporation is a Waltham, Massachusetts-based manufacturer, and is a subsidiary of Olympus Corporation. One of its companies, for example, is Olympus Imaging and Measuring Systems, specializing in imaging instruments for testing and measurement during industrial inspections. In April 2022, Olympus Scientific rebranded itself as Evident Corporation, and at first was a wholly owned subsidiary of Olympus corporation. However, a year later, Evident was acquired by Bain Capital.

=== Industrial ===
Olympus manufactures and sells industrial scanners, flaw detectors, probes and transducers, thickness gages, digital cameras, image analysis software, industrial videoscopes, fiberscopes, light sources, XRF and XRD analyzers, and high-speed video cameras.

== Name and logo ==
- 1919: The company was founded as Takachiho Seisakusho (高千穂製作所). In Japanese mythology, deities live on Takamagahara, the peak of Mt. Takachiho. The first corporate logo was TOKIWA, derived from Tokiwa Shokai, the company that the founder, Takeshi Yamashita, had worked for. Tokiwa Shokai held an equity stake in Takachiho Seisakusho and was responsible for marketing Takachiho products. The logo reads "TOKIWA TOKYO". The "G" and "M" marks above are believed to be the initials of Goro Matsukata, the president of Tokiwa Shokai.
- 1921: The Olympus brand was introduced in February 1921. This logo was used for microscopes and other products. Brochures and newspaper ads for cameras also used this logo. The OLYMPUS TOKYO logo is still in use today. There was a period in which OIC was used instead of TOKYO in the logo. OIC stood for Optical Industrial Company, which was a translation of Olympus's Japanese corporate name at that time. This logo was used for the GT-I and GT-II endoscopes, among others.
- 1942: The company was renamed to Takachiho Optical Co., Ltd., when optical products became the mainstay of the company.
- 1949: The name changed to Olympus Optical Co., Ltd. It was named after Mount Olympus, which like Mt. Takachiho is the home of gods, this time of Greek mythology. In the words of the company, they chose the name to "reflect its strong aspiration to create high-quality, world-famous products".
- 1970: The new logo was designed to give impressions of quality and sophistication.
- 2001: The yellow line underneath the new logo is called the "Opto-Digital Pattern" and it represents light and boundless possibilities of digital technology. It symbolizes dynamic and innovative nature of Opto-Digital Technology and Olympus Corporation. This logo is called the Communication Symbol of Olympus and it represents Olympus's brand image.
- 2003: Renamed to Olympus Corporation.

== Corporate affairs ==
=== Ownership ===
Shareholding in Olympus is dispersed, and the company's key institutional investors are largely passive. As of 31 March 2011, investors included Nippon Life Insurance (8.4%), Bank of Tokyo-Mitsubishi (4.98%), and Sumitomo Mitsui Banking (3.13%), and the Government of Singapore Investment Corporation (2.55%). Foreign institutions and individuals spoke for 27.71% of Olympus shares. On 28 September 2012, Olympus and Sony announced that Olympus would receive a 50 billion yen capital injection from Sony. On 22 February 2013, Sony became the largest shareholder (11.46%) of Olympus, later cutting that stake in half during one of its own restructurings, only to sell its entire remaining stake in Olympus, totaling 5% of the company, after a request by activist investor Daniel S. Loeb to do so, in 2019.

=== Governance ===
According to its 2011 Annual Report, Olympus was governed by a 15-person board of directors, with Tsuyoshi Kikukawa its president and CEO, and Michael C. Woodford as president and chief operating officer. Mr Kikukawa resigned in the following year and was arrested by Tokyo police for alleged criminal offenses during and before his term as president and CEO. The corporation in 2011 had three "outside directors". It had a four-member 'Board of Auditors' which supervises and audits directors' performance. The company's executive committee consisted of 28 members, responsible for the day-to-day operations.

== Scandals ==
=== 2011 accounting scandal ===
In 2011, the company attracted worldwide media scrutiny when it fired its newly appointed English chief executive (CEO) Michael Christopher Woodford, a 30-year Olympus veteran, for probing into financial irregularities and unexplained payments totaling hundreds of millions of US dollars. Although the board initially dismissed Woodford's concerns via mass media as "disruptive" and Woodford himself as failing to grasp the local culture, the matter quickly snowballed into a corporate corruption scandal concerning alleged concealment of more than ¥117.7 billion ($1.5 billion) in investment losses, kickbacks, and covert payments to criminal organizations dating back as far as the 1980s. One of the longest-lasting accounting scandals in Japanese corporate history, the incident wiped out over three-quarters of the company's valuation and led much of the board to resign in disgrace. Investigations were launched across Japan, the United Kingdom, and the United States, culminating in the arrests of numerous corporate directors, senior managers, auditors, and bankers and raising significant concerns over prevailing standards of corporate governance and transparency, as well as the state of Japanese financial markets. Woodford himself, who stated he had received death threats for his role in exposing the cover-up, was reportedly awarded £10 million ($16 million) in damages for defamation and wrongful dismissal. In the wake of this turmoil, Olympus announced plans to shed 2,700 jobs (seven percent of its workforce) and shut 40 percent of its 30 manufacturing plants by 2015.

On 1 April 2011, Michael Christopher Woodford, 51, was named president and chief operating officer – the first ever foreigner to hold the position – replacing Kikukawa, who became chairman. Woodford, an Olympus veteran of 30 years, was previously executive managing director of Olympus Medical Systems Europa. Olympus appointed Woodford its CEO six months later, but the board suddenly removed him as chief executive two weeks into the job, while allowing him to retain his board seat.

Woodford alleged that his removal was linked to several prior acquisitions he questioned, particularly the US$2.2 billion deal in 2008 to acquire British medical equipment maker Gyrus Group. Thomson Reuters reported that US$687 million was paid to a middle-man as a success fee – a sum equal to 31% of the purchase price, and which ranks as the highest ever M&A fee. According to the Daily Telegraph, some of the sums paid out relating to the acquisition of a technology company ITX were also under examination. Woodford noted that an article in Japanese financial magazine Facta in July prompted his suspicion of the transactions. Reports also said the company acquired three other Japanese companies outside its core business, and recognised that the assets were worth US$721 million less than their acquisition value 12 months previously.

Shareholders expressed concern after Olympus's share price nearly halved in value following the Woodford revelations, and asked for "prompt action". Following his dismissal, Woodford passed on information to the British Serious Fraud Office, and requested police protection. He said the payments may have been linked to "forces behind" the Olympus board. Japanese newspaper Sankei suggested that a total of US$1.5 billion in acquisition-related advisory payments could be linked to the yakuza.

The company responded on 19 October that "major differences had arisen between Mr. Woodford and other management regarding the direction and conduct of the company’s business". On the Gyrus acquisition, it also declared the Audit Board's view that "no dishonesty or illegality is found in the transaction itself, nor any breach of obligation to good management or any systematic errors by the directors recognised." On 26 October, the company announced that to assuage shareholders' concerns, Kikukawa resigned as chairman; he was replaced by Shuichi Takayama. Olympus shares rebounded 23 percent.

On 8 November 2011, the company admitted that the money had been used to cover losses on investments dating to the 1990s and that company's accounting practice was "not appropriate", thus coming clean on "one of the biggest and longest-running loss-hiding arrangements in Japanese corporate history", according to the Wall Street Journal. The company laid the blame for the inappropriate accounting on ex-president Tsuyoshi Kikukawa, auditor Hideo Yamada, and executive VP Hisashi Mori.

On 21 December 2011, Japanese authorities, including the Tokyo prosecutor's office, the Tokyo Metropolitan Police and the Japanese Securities and Exchange Surveillance Commission, raided the company's offices in Tokyo.

In February 2012, seven Olympus executives were arrested by Japanese police and prosecutors. Former president Tsuyoshi Kikukawa, former executive vice president Hisashi Mori, and former auditor Hideo Yamada were taken into custody on suspicion of violating the Financial Instruments and Exchange Law, along with former bankers Akio Nakagawa and Nobumasa Yokoo and two others, suspected of having helped the board hide significant losses.

On 25 September 2012, the company and Kikukawa, Yamada, and Mori pleaded guilty to collusion to submit false financial reports.

On 1 March 2016, Olympus agreed to pay $646 million of fines to US authorities.

=== 2024 CEO resignation ===
On October 28, 2024, CEO Stefan Kaufmann was forced to resign by the Olympus board of directors after allegations of purchasing illegal narcotics. Preceding executive Yasuo Takeuchi was assigned the new CEO. Share prices dropped by 6% following the news. On November 28, a 44-year-old man was re-arrested on drug dealing and extortion charges, allegedly forcing Kaufmann to pay 9,150,000 yen across 23 payments as hush money. Kaufmann was later sentenced by the Tokyo District court to 10 months in prison. The presiding judge commented: "It is clear he had a deep involvement with illegal drugs and was dependent on them."

== See also ==
- Four Thirds system
- Laboratory equipment
- List of digital camera brands
- List of Olympus products
- List of photographic equipment makers
- Micro Four Thirds system
- Variable Control Voice Actuator
- xD-Picture Card and SmartMedia
- Olympus Photo
