= Facta (magazine) =

Japanese economic information magazine

- Categories: News magazine Business magazine
- Frequency: Monthly
- Founder: Shigeo Abe
- Founded: 2005; 20 years ago
- Country: Japan
- Language: Japanese
- Website: facta.co.jp

Facta is a Japanese monthly news magazine that features economic information for readers. The magazine provides investigative reports.

== History and profile ==
Facta was first established by Shigeo Abe in 2005. Abe is also the publisher of the magazine. It is published monthly and delivered only to subscribers.

In 2011 Facta was the first to publish allegations which culminated in the Olympus scandal. It received the Editors' Choice Magazine Journalism Award for this reporting.

Following international interest in the Olympus story, Facta began publishing an English language website and subscription newsletter Excerpt FACTA. However, this was discontinued in September 2013.
