= Yamaichi Securities =

Japanese securities trading firm (1897-1999)

Yamaichi Securities Co., Ltd.
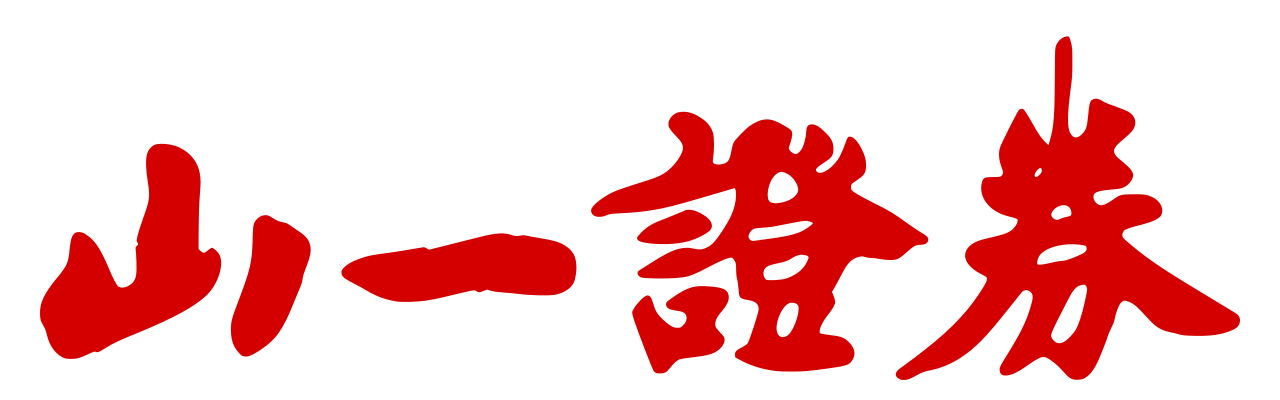
- Industry: Finance
- Founded: 1897; 129 years ago
- Defunct: June 2, 1999; 27 years ago
- Fate: Bankruptcy
- Headquarters: Japan
- Services: Securities trading

Yamaichi Securities Co., Ltd. (山一證券株式会社, Yamaichi Shōken Kabushiki-gaisha) was a Japanese securities trading firm. The company announced it would cease operations on November 24, 1997 and was declared bankrupt by the Tokyo District Court on June 2, 1999.

== History ==
Yamaichi, which was formed in 1897, was at one time one of the four major Japanese brokerages. Its clients were major Japanese corporations.

In the boom of the 1980s it was given specified sums of money by 10 of its clients to invest as it saw fit. A sharp downturn in the early 1990s and poor dealings by Yamaichi generated losses of more than 200 billion yen. Fearing the demise of the firm through loss of reputation that would result if the scale of losses became known, the brokerage shouldered the loss of its clients, and moved it off balance sheet.

Yamaichi sold in a private placement Touchwood Pacific Partners limited partnership to about 50 Japanese institutional or private investors in the amount of $191 million in 1990 for The Walt Disney Company film production.

=== Tobashi and collapse ===
In January 1992, Yamaichi executives resorted to such a tobashi scheme, setting up a separate company called Yamaichi Enterprise which opened an account at the Tokyo branch of Zürich, Switzerland-based Credit Suisse. Depositing ¥200 billion in Japanese government bonds, the Yamaichi subsidiary then used the dummy companies to generate profits for clients while eventually absorbing losses of ¥158.3 billion. A separate scheme using foreign currency bonds resulted in losses of ¥106.5 billion being hidden in Yamaichi's Australian subsidiary.

The magazine Weekly Toyo Keizai uncovered the fraud in April 1997. For its journalism the magazine was awarded the Editors' Choice Magazine Journalism Award.

Tsugio Yukihira, chairman of the brokerage at the time of its collapse, acknowledged in front of a Japanese Diet hearing that the activities were illegal. He said that only three people at the brokerage, namely himself, former President Atsuo Miki and another individual, knew about the arrangements; he declined to name the 10 firms involved in the illegal trading. The company announced it would cease operations on November 24, 1997 and was declared bankrupt by the Tokyo District Court on June 2, 1999.

The company's last president, Shohei Nozawa made a tearful public apology on Japanese television. Japan's Minister of Finance announced that steps would be taken to ensure the event would not further destabilize the frail Japanese banking system and economy as a whole. On June 1, 2001, the company's last chairman, Tsugio Yukihira, settled a lawsuit filed in Tokyo District Court. Suitors alleged his window-dressing tobashi schemes and illegal dealings had undermined the brokerage and led to its demise.
