= Nikkei Sangyo Shimbun =

Daily business newspaper in Japan

The Nikkei Sangyo Shimbun (日経産業新聞, Nikkei Sangyō Shinbun), which means Nikkei Industrial Journal, is a Japanese daily newspaper published on weekdays by Nihon Keizai Shimbun, Inc. The paper was launched in 1973. It presents news in regard to the Japanese manufacturing sector. As of 2002 the circulation of the paper was 270,000 copies.
