= Tobashi scheme =

Financial fraud through creative accounting where a client's losses are hidden

A tobashi scheme is a financial fraud through creative accounting where a client's losses are hidden by an investment firm by shifting them between the portfolios of other (genuine or fake) clients. Any real client with portfolio losses can therefore have its accounts flattered by this process. This cycling cannot continue indefinitely, so the investment firm itself ends up picking up the cost. As it is ultimately expensive, there must be a strong incentive for the investment firm to pursue this activity on behalf of its clients.

== Etymology ==
Tobashi (Japanese: 飛ばし) is Japanese for "flying away". It describes the practice where external investment firms typically sell or otherwise take loss-bearing investments off the books of one client company at their near-cost valuation to conceal investment losses from the clients' financial statements. In that sense, the losses are made to disappear, or 'fly away'.

== Structure ==
The scheme often makes use of off-balance sheet financing or special purpose vehicles with non-coterminous accounting periods. Assets and liabilities are transferred at fictitious valuations, in the hope that losses are deferred until the market recovers. There are no rules as to how frequently the assets are transferred, and because there is little transparency over the valuation, losses can grow at every sale.

As the 1990s market rout dragged on, simple loss deferrals were no longer enough. Advisors began devising schemes to secure compensation for holding onto toxic investments through other means—such as buying specially issued bonds or paying for non-existent services.

During the Japanese stock market boom in the late 1980s, investment bankers persuaded many Japanese companies to raise capital by issuing bonds with warrants attached, although they did not require the funds for operational purposes. Clients were tempted by the potential returns the investment firms said they could generate on stock market investments. However, as stock values fell, companies were in a vicious circle where not only their investments soured, the debt remained after issued warrants expired, weakening the companies' capital base.

In Japan, it is an offence under the Securities and Exchange Law for a brokerage itself to compensate the final client's losses. In 1991, it became a criminal offence for brokers to compensate clients for investments which had gone bad or to otherwise conceal their losses. In the late 1990s new accounting rules introduced required investment valuations to be mark-to-market, forcing losses or gains to be shown in the financial statements. Despite the tightening, a loophole involving intangible assets continued to be exploited: Japanese acquisition accounting rules allow companies to record M&A fees on their deals as part of consideration, and goodwill on consolidation may be depreciated over 20 years.

== Scandals ==
The Wall Street Journal reports that in 1992 alone, four securities firms were exposed in the local press for various tobashi scams; Cosmo Securities, Daiwa Securities, Yamatane Securities, and the former Maruman Securities all had more than one billion yen of losses that were concealed.

=== Yamaichi Securities ===
In January 1992, Yamaichi Securities executives resorted to such a tobashi scheme, setting up a separate company called Yamaichi Enterprise which opened an account at the Tokyo branch of Credit Suisse. Depositing ¥200 billion in Japanese government bonds, the Yamaichi subsidiary then used the dummy companies to generate profits for clients while eventually absorbing losses of ¥158.3 billion. A separate scheme using foreign currency bonds resulted in losses of ¥106.5 billion being hidden in Yamaichi's Australian subsidiary.

In August 1993, Japan's Ministry of Finance inspected 47 financial institutions for tobashi, all of whom denied the practice. In December the MoF asked for reports from all 289 brokers on tobashi activity.

=== Olympus scandal ===
In October 2011 amidst the controversial removal of the newly appointed chief executive officer, it was revealed that Olympus Corporation had been operating a tobashi scheme in which US$2 billion was said to have been siphoned off to cover bad investments made up to 20 years before.

On 8 November 2011, in what The Wall Street Journal referred to as "one of the biggest and longest-running loss-hiding arrangements in Japanese corporate history", the company admitted that the money had been used to cover losses on investments dating to the 1990s. and that it had adopted "inappropriate" accounting practice. The company laid the blame for the inappropriate accounting on ex-president Tsuyoshi Kikukawa, auditor Hideo Yamada, and executive VP Hisashi Mori, all of whom resigned.

== See also ==
- Repo 105, a Lehman Brothers tobashi scheme using repurchase agreements to conceal debt
- Hollywood accounting, using an inverted tobashi scheme to hide profits
- Creative accounting
- Fraud
