= List of Capcom games: N–R =

This is a list of video games by Capcom organized alphabetically by name. The list may also include ports that were developed and published by others companies under license from Capcom.

Title	System	Release date	Developer(s)	JP	NA	EU	AUS	Ref(s)
Namco × Capcom	PlayStation 2	May 26, 2005	Monolith Soft	Yes				
Nazo Waku Yakata	Nintendo 3DS	2011	Capcom	Yes				
Nemo	Arcade	November 20, 1990	Capcom	Yes				
Netto de Tennis	Dreamcast	2000	Capcom	Yes				
New Super Mario Bros. Wii Coin World	Arcade	2011	Capcom	Yes				
Night Warriors: Darkstalkers' Revenge	Arcade	March 3, 1995	Capcom	Yes	Yes	Yes		
Night Warriors: Darkstalkers' Revenge	Sega Saturn	February 22, 1996	Capcom	Yes	Yes	Yes		
Ōkami	PlayStation 2	April 20, 2006	Clover Studio	Yes	Yes	Yes	Yes	
Ōkami	Wii	April 15, 2008	Clover Studio	Yes	Yes	Yes	Yes	
Ōkami HD	PlayStation 3	October 30, 2012	Clover Studio	Yes	Yes	Yes	Yes	
Ōkami HD	Microsoft Windows	December 12, 2017	Clover Studio	Yes	Yes	Yes	Yes	
Ōkami HD	PlayStation 4	December 12, 2017	Clover Studio	Yes	Yes	Yes	Yes	
Ōkami HD	Xbox One	December 12, 2017	Clover Studio	Yes	Yes	Yes	Yes	
Ōkami HD	Nintendo Switch	August 9, 2018	Clover Studio	Yes	Yes	Yes	Yes	
Ōkamiden	Nintendo DS	September 30, 2010	Mobile & Game Studio, Inc.	Yes	Yes	Yes	Yes	
One Piece Mansion	PlayStation	June 21, 2001	Capcom	Yes	Yes	Yes		
Onimusha 2: Samurai's Destiny	PlayStation 2	March 7, 2002	Capcom	Yes	Yes	Yes	Yes	
Onimusha 3: Demon Siege	PlayStation 2	February 26, 2004	Capcom	Yes	Yes	Yes	Yes	
Onimusha Blade Warriors	PlayStation 2	November 27, 2003	Capcom	Yes	Yes	Yes		
Onimusha: Dawn of Dreams	PlayStation 2	January 26, 2006	Capcom	Yes	Yes	Yes	Yes	
Onimusha Soul	Web browser	June 28, 2012	Capcom	Yes				
Onimusha Tactics	Game Boy Advance	July 25, 2003	Capcom	Yes	Yes	Yes		
Onimusha Tactics	Virtual Console	August 6, 2015	Capcom		Yes			
Onimusha: Warlords	PlayStation 2	January 25, 2001	Capcom	Yes	Yes	Yes		
Onimusha: Warlords	Microsoft Windows	July 8, 2003	Capcom	Yes	Yes	Yes	Yes	
Onimusha: Warlords	Nintendo Switch	December 20, 2018	Capcom	Yes	Yes	Yes	Yes	
Onimusha: Warlords	PlayStation 4	December 20, 2018	Capcom	Yes	Yes	Yes	Yes	
Onimusha: Warlords	Xbox One	January 15, 2019	Capcom	Yes	Yes	Yes	Yes	
Onimusha: Way of the Sword	Microsoft Windows	September 25, 2026	Capcom	Coming	Coming	Coming	Coming	
Onimusha: Way of the Sword	PlayStation 5	September 25, 2026	Capcom	Coming	Coming	Coming	Coming	
Onimusha: Way of the Sword	Xbox Series X/S	September 25, 2026	Capcom	Coming	Coming	Coming	Coming	
Pro Cast Sports Fishing	Xbox	August 27, 2003	Capcom	Yes	Yes	Yes	Yes	
Oshiete Fighter	Microsoft Windows	1998	Capcom	Yes				
P.N.03	GameCube	March 27, 2003	Capcom	Yes	Yes	Yes	Yes	
Panic Shot! Rockman	Redemption game	1993	Capcom	Yes				
Phoenix Wright: Ace Attorney	Game Boy Advance	October 12, 2001	Capcom	Yes				
Phoenix Wright: Ace Attorney	Nintendo DS	September 15, 2005	Capcom	Yes	Yes	Yes		
Phoenix Wright: Ace Attorney	Microsoft Windows	December 23, 2005	Capcom	Yes	Yes	Yes	Yes	
Phoenix Wright: Ace Attorney	Wii	December 15, 2009	Capcom	Yes	Yes	Yes	Yes	
Phoenix Wright: Ace Attorney	iOS	December 21, 2009	Capcom	Yes	Yes	Yes		
Phoenix Wright: Ace Attorney	Android	February 7, 2012	Capcom	Yes				
Phoenix Wright: Ace Attorney	Nintendo 3DS	April 17, 2014	Capcom	Yes	Yes	Yes	Yes	
Phoenix Wright: Ace Attorney	Nintendo Switch	February 21, 2019	Capcom	Yes	Yes	Yes	Yes	
Phoenix Wright: Ace Attorney	PlayStation 4	February 21, 2019	Capcom	Yes	Yes	Yes	Yes	
Phoenix Wright: Ace Attorney	Xbox One	February 21, 2019	Capcom	Yes	Yes	Yes	Yes	
Phoenix Wright: Ace Attorney − Dual Destinies	Nintendo 3DS	July 25, 2013	Capcom	Yes	Yes	Yes	Yes	
Phoenix Wright: Ace Attorney − Dual Destinies	iOS	August 7, 2014	Capcom	Yes	Yes	Yes	Yes	
Phoenix Wright: Ace Attorney − Dual Destinies	Android	May 23, 2017	Capcom	Yes	Yes	Yes	Yes	
Phoenix Wright: Ace Attorney − Justice for All	Game Boy Advance	October 22, 2002	Capcom	Yes				
Phoenix Wright: Ace Attorney − Justice for All	Microsoft Windows	March 31, 2006	Capcom	Yes	Yes	Yes	Yes	
Phoenix Wright: Ace Attorney − Justice for All	Nintendo DS	October 26, 2006	Capcom	Yes	Yes	Yes	Yes	
Phoenix Wright: Ace Attorney − Justice for All	Wii	January 26, 2010	Capcom	Yes	Yes	Yes	Yes	
Phoenix Wright: Ace Attorney − Justice for All	Android	February 7, 2012	Capcom	Yes				
Phoenix Wright: Ace Attorney − Justice for All	iOS	February 7, 2012	Capcom	Yes	Yes	Yes		
Phoenix Wright: Ace Attorney − Justice for All	Nintendo 3DS	April 17, 2014	Capcom	Yes	Yes	Yes	Yes	
Phoenix Wright: Ace Attorney − Justice for All	Nintendo Switch	February 21, 2019	Capcom	Yes	Yes	Yes	Yes	
Phoenix Wright: Ace Attorney − Justice for All	PlayStation 4	February 21, 2019	Capcom	Yes	Yes	Yes	Yes	
Phoenix Wright: Ace Attorney − Justice for All	Xbox One	February 21, 2019	Capcom	Yes	Yes	Yes	Yes	
Phoenix Wright: Ace Attorney − Spirit of Justice	Nintendo 3DS	June 9, 2016	Capcom	Yes	Yes	Yes	Yes	
Phoenix Wright: Ace Attorney − Spirit of Justice	iOS	September 21, 2017	Capcom	Yes	Yes	Yes	Yes	
Phoenix Wright: Ace Attorney − Spirit of Justice	Android	September 21, 2017	Capcom	Yes	Yes	Yes	Yes	
Phoenix Wright: Ace Attorney − Trials and Tribulations	Game Boy Advance	January 23, 2004	Capcom	Yes				
Phoenix Wright: Ace Attorney − Trials and Tribulations	Microsoft Windows	March 31, 2006	Capcom	Yes	Yes	Yes	Yes	
Phoenix Wright: Ace Attorney − Trials and Tribulations	Nintendo DS	August 23, 2007	Capcom	Yes	Yes	Yes		
Phoenix Wright: Ace Attorney − Trials and Tribulations	Wii	February 23, 2010	Capcom	Yes	Yes	Yes		
Phoenix Wright: Ace Attorney − Trials and Tribulations	Android	February 7, 2012	Capcom	Yes				
Phoenix Wright: Ace Attorney − Trials and Tribulations	iOS	February 7, 2012	Capcom	Yes	Yes	Yes		
Phoenix Wright: Ace Attorney − Trials and Tribulations	Nintendo 3DS	April 17, 2014	Capcom	Yes	Yes	Yes	Yes	
Phoenix Wright: Ace Attorney − Trials and Tribulations	Nintendo Switch	February 21, 2019	Capcom	Yes	Yes	Yes	Yes	
Phoenix Wright: Ace Attorney − Trials and Tribulations	PlayStation 4	February 21, 2019	Capcom	Yes	Yes	Yes	Yes	
Phoenix Wright: Ace Attorney − Trials and Tribulations	Xbox One	February 21, 2019	Capcom	Yes	Yes	Yes	Yes	
Pinball Magic	Pinball	1995	Capcom	Yes	Yes	Yes	Yes	
Pirate Ship Higemaru	Arcade	September 1984	Capcom	Yes				
Planet Work	iOS	March 9, 2011	Capcom	Yes	Yes	Yes	Yes	
Plasma Sword: Nightmare of Bilstein	Arcade	April 1998	Capcom	Yes	Yes	Yes	Yes	
Plasma Sword: Nightmare of Bilstein	Dreamcast	December 9, 1999	Capcom	Yes	Yes	Yes	Yes	
Pocket Fighter	Arcade	September 4, 1997	Capcom	Yes	Yes			
Pocket Fighter	PlayStation	June 11, 1998	Capcom	Yes	Yes	Yes		
Pocket Fighter	PlayStation 2	June 11, 1998	Capcom	Yes	Yes	Yes		
Pocket Fighter	Sega Saturn	July 9, 1998	Capcom	Yes				
Pocket Fighter	WonderSwan	April 6, 2000	Capcom	Yes				
Pocket Rockets	Amiga	1988		Yes	Yes	Yes	Yes	
Pocket Rockets	Commodore 64	1988		Yes	Yes	Yes	Yes	
Pocket Rockets	DOS	1988	Riggs International	Yes	Yes	Yes	Yes	
Power Quest	Game Boy Color	November 27, 1998	Japan System Supply	Yes	Yes	Yes		
Power Stone	Arcade	April 6, 2000	Capcom	Yes	Yes			
Power Stone	Dreamcast	February 25, 1999	Capcom	Yes	Yes	Yes		
Power Stone 2	Arcade	April 2000	Capcom	Yes				
Power Stone 2	Dreamcast	April 27, 2000	Capcom	Yes	Yes	Yes		
Power Stone Collection	PlayStation Portable	October 20, 2006	Klein Computer Entertainment	Yes	Yes	Yes	Yes	
Pragmata	Microsoft Windows	April 17, 2026	Capcom	Yes	Yes	Yes	Yes	
Pragmata	PlayStation 5	April 17, 2026	Capcom	Yes	Yes	Yes	Yes	
Pragmata	Xbox Series X/S	April 17, 2026	Capcom	Yes	Yes	Yes	Yes	
Pragmata	Nintendo Switch 2	April 17, 2026	Capcom	Yes	Yes	Yes	Yes	
Pro Cast Sports Fishing	Xbox	August 27, 2003	Capcom	Yes	Yes	Yes	Yes	
Professor Layton vs. Phoenix Wright: Ace Attorney	Nintendo 3DS	November 29, 2012	Level-5/Capcom	Yes	Yes	Yes	Yes	
Pro Yakyuu? Satsujin Jiken!	Nintendo Entertainment System	December 24, 1988		Yes				
Progear	Arcade	January 17, 2001	CAVE	Yes	Yes			
Project Justice	Arcade	December 17, 2000	Capcom	Yes	Yes	Yes		
Project Justice	Dreamcast	December 17, 2000	Capcom	Yes	Yes	Yes		
Project X Zone	Nintendo 3DS	October 11, 2012	Monolith Soft/Banpresto	Yes	Yes	Yes	Yes	
Project X Zone 2	Nintendo 3DS	November 12, 2015	Monolith Soft	Yes	Yes	Yes	Yes	
Puzz Loop	Arcade	December 1998	Mitchell Corporation	Yes	Yes	Yes		
Puzz Loop	Game Boy Color	November 1999	Mitchell Corporation	Yes	Yes			
Puzz Loop	Neo Geo Pocket Color	December 1998	Mitchell Corporation	Yes	Yes	Yes		
Puzz Loop	Nuon	July 2000	Mitchell Corporation		Yes			
Puzz Loop	PlayStation	October 31, 1999	Mitchell Corporation	Yes	Yes	Yes		
Puzz Loop	iOS	2008	Hudson Soft	Yes	Yes	Yes	Yes	
Puzz Loop 2	Arcade	2001	Mitchell Corporation	Yes	Yes	Yes		
Puzzle Fighter	iOS	2017	Capcom	Yes	Yes	Yes	Yes	
Puzzle Fighter	Android	2017	Capcom	Yes	Yes	Yes	Yes	
Quiz & Dragons: Capcom Quiz Game	Arcade	July 2, 1991	Capcom	Yes	Yes	Yes	Yes	
Quiz Nanairo Dreams	Arcade	August 1996	Capcom	Yes				
Quiz Nanairo Dreams: Nijiiro-cho no Kiseki	PlayStation	June 27, 1997	Capcom	Yes				
Quiz Nanairo Dreams: Nijiiro-cho no Kiseki	Sega Saturn	June 27, 1997	Capcom	Yes				
Quiz San Goku Shi	Arcade	June 1991	Capcom	Yes				
Quiz Tonosama no Yabou 2	Arcade	1995	Capcom	Yes				
Red Dead Revolver	PlayStation 2	May 25, 2005	Rockstar San Diego	Yes				
Red Dead Revolver	Xbox	May 25, 2005	Rockstar San Diego	Yes				
Red Earth	Arcade	November 21, 1996	Capcom	Yes				
Remember Me	PlayStation 3	June 3, 2013	Dontnod Entertainment		Yes	Yes	Yes	
Remember Me	Microsoft Windows	June 3, 2013	Dontnod Entertainment		Yes	Yes	Yes	
Remember Me	Xbox 360	June 3, 2013	Dontnod Entertainment		Yes	Yes	Yes	
Resident Evil	PlayStation	March 22, 1996	Capcom	Yes	Yes	Yes	Yes	
Resident Evil	Microsoft Windows	December 6, 1996	Capcom	Yes	Yes	Yes	Yes	
Resident Evil	Sega Saturn	July 25, 1997	Capcom	Yes	Yes	Yes	Yes	
Resident Evil (remake)	GameCube	March 22, 2002	Capcom	Yes	Yes	Yes		
Resident Evil (remake)	Wii	December 25, 2008	Capcom	Yes	Yes	Yes		
Resident Evil (remake)	Microsoft Windows	November 27, 2014	Capcom	Yes	Yes	Yes	Yes	
Resident Evil (remake)	PlayStation 3	November 27, 2014	Capcom	Yes	Yes	Yes	Yes	
Resident Evil (remake)	PlayStation 4	November 27, 2014	Capcom	Yes	Yes	Yes	Yes	
Resident Evil (remake)	Xbox 360	November 27, 2014	Capcom	Yes	Yes	Yes	Yes	
Resident Evil (remake)	Xbox One	November 27, 2014	Capcom	Yes	Yes	Yes	Yes	
Resident Evil (remake)	Nintendo Switch	May 21, 2019	Capcom	Yes	Yes	Yes	Yes	
Resident Evil 2	PlayStation	January 21, 1998	Capcom	Yes	Yes	Yes	Yes	
Resident Evil 2	Microsoft Windows	February 19, 1999	Capcom	Yes	Yes	Yes	Yes	
Resident Evil 2	Nintendo 64	October 31, 1999	Capcom	Yes	Yes	Yes	Yes	
Resident Evil 2	Dreamcast	December 22, 1999	Capcom	Yes	Yes	Yes	Yes	
Resident Evil 2	GameCube	January 14, 2003	Capcom	Yes	Yes	Yes	Yes	
Resident Evil 2	PlayStation Network	2007	Capcom	Yes				
Resident Evil 2 (remake)	Microsoft Windows	January 25, 2019	Capcom	Yes	Yes	Yes	Yes	
Resident Evil 2 (remake)	PlayStation 4	January 25, 2019	Capcom	Yes	Yes	Yes	Yes	
Resident Evil 2 (remake)	Xbox One	January 25, 2019	Capcom	Yes	Yes	Yes	Yes	
Resident Evil 2: Dual Shock Version	PlayStation	August 6, 1998	Capcom	Yes	Yes			
Resident Evil 3: Nemesis	PlayStation	September 22, 1999	Capcom	Yes	Yes	Yes		
Resident Evil 3: Nemesis	Microsoft Windows	June 16, 2000	Capcom	Yes	Yes	Yes		
Resident Evil 3: Nemesis	Dreamcast	November 16, 2000	Capcom	Yes	Yes	Yes		
Resident Evil 3: Nemesis	GameCube	January 23, 2003	Capcom	Yes	Yes	Yes		
Resident Evil 3: Nemesis	PlayStation Network	2008	Capcom	Yes	Yes			
Resident Evil 3 (remake)	Microsoft Windows	April 3, 2020	Capcom	Yes	Yes	Yes	Yes	
Resident Evil 3 (remake)	PlayStation 4	April 3, 2020	Capcom	Yes	Yes	Yes	Yes	
Resident Evil 3 (remake)	Xbox One	April 3, 2020	Capcom	Yes	Yes	Yes	Yes	
Resident Evil 4	GameCube	January 11, 2005	Capcom	Yes	Yes	Yes	Yes	
Resident Evil 4	PlayStation 2	October 25, 2005	Capcom	Yes	Yes	Yes	Yes	
Resident Evil 4	Microsoft Windows	March 1, 2007	Capcom	Yes	Yes	Yes	Yes	
Resident Evil 4	iOS	July 27, 2009	Capcom	Yes	Yes			
Resident Evil 4	Android	January 23, 2013	Capcom	Yes	Yes	Yes	Yes	
Resident Evil 4	PlayStation 4	August 30, 2016	Capcom	Yes	Yes	Yes	Yes	
Resident Evil 4	Xbox One	August 30, 2016	Capcom	Yes	Yes	Yes	Yes	
Resident Evil 4	Nintendo Switch	May 21, 2019	Capcom	Yes	Yes	Yes	Yes	
Resident Evil 4 (remake)	PlayStation 4	March 24, 2023	Capcom	Yes	Yes	Yes	Yes	
Resident Evil 4 (remake)	PlayStation 5	March 24, 2023	Capcom	Yes	Yes	Yes	Yes	
Resident Evil 4 (remake)	Xbox Series X/S	March 24, 2023	Capcom	Yes	Yes	Yes	Yes	
Resident Evil 4 (remake)	Microsoft Windows	March 24, 2023	Capcom	Yes	Yes	Yes	Yes	
Resident Evil 4 HD	PlayStation Network	September 20, 2011	Capcom	Yes	Yes	Yes		
Resident Evil 4 HD	Xbox Live Marketplace	September 20, 2011	Capcom	Yes	Yes	Yes		
Resident Evil 4: Ultimate HD Edition	Microsoft Windows	February 27, 2014	Capcom	Yes	Yes	Yes	Yes	
Resident Evil 4: Wii Edition	Wii	May 31, 2007	Capcom	Yes	Yes	Yes	Yes	
Resident Evil 4: Wii Edition	Nintendo eShop	October 29, 2015	Capcom		Yes	Yes		
Resident Evil 5	PlayStation 3	March 5, 2009	Capcom	Yes	Yes	Yes	Yes	
Resident Evil 5	Xbox 360	March 5, 2009	Capcom	Yes	Yes	Yes	Yes	
Resident Evil 5	Microsoft Windows	September 17, 2009	Capcom	Yes	Yes	Yes	Yes	
Resident Evil 5	PlayStation 4	June 28, 2016	Capcom	Yes	Yes	Yes	Yes	
Resident Evil 5	Xbox One	June 28, 2016	Capcom	Yes	Yes	Yes	Yes	
Resident Evil 5	Nintendo Switch	October 29, 2019	Capcom	Yes	Yes	Yes	Yes	
Resident Evil 5: Gold Edition	PlayStation 3	February 18, 2010	Capcom	Yes	Yes	Yes	Yes	
Resident Evil 5: Gold Edition	Xbox 360	March 9, 2010	Capcom		Yes	Yes	Yes	
Resident Evil 5: Gold Edition	Microsoft Windows	March 26, 2015	Capcom	Yes	Yes	Yes	Yes	
Resident Evil 6	PlayStation 3	October 2, 2012	Capcom	Yes	Yes	Yes	Yes	
Resident Evil 6	Xbox 360	October 2, 2012	Capcom	Yes	Yes	Yes	Yes	
Resident Evil 6	Microsoft Windows	March 21, 2013	Capcom	Yes	Yes	Yes	Yes	
Resident Evil 6	PlayStation 4	March 29, 2016	Capcom	Yes	Yes	Yes	Yes	
Resident Evil 6	Xbox One	March 29, 2016	Capcom	Yes	Yes	Yes	Yes	
Resident Evil 6	Nintendo Switch	October 29, 2019	Capcom	Yes	Yes	Yes	Yes	
Resident Evil 7: Biohazard	Microsoft Windows	January 24, 2017	Capcom	Yes	Yes	Yes	Yes	
Resident Evil 7: Biohazard	PlayStation 4	January 24, 2017	Capcom	Yes	Yes	Yes	Yes	
Resident Evil 7: Biohazard	Xbox One	January 24, 2017	Capcom	Yes	Yes	Yes	Yes	
Resident Evil Archives: Resident Evil	Wii	December 25, 2008	Capcom	Yes	Yes	Yes	Yes	
Resident Evil Archives: Resident Evil Zero	Wii	July 10, 2008	Capcom	Yes	Yes	Yes	Yes	
Resident Evil – Code: Veronica	Dreamcast	February 3, 2000	Capcom	Yes	Yes	Yes		
Resident Evil – Code: Veronica X	PlayStation 2	March 22, 2001	Capcom	Yes	Yes	Yes		
Resident Evil – Code: Veronica X	GameCube	August 7, 2003	Capcom	Yes	Yes	Yes		
Resident Evil – Code: Veronica X HD	PlayStation Network	September 27, 2011	Capcom	Yes	Yes	Yes	Yes	
Resident Evil – Code: Veronica X HD	Xbox Live Marketplace	September 27, 2011	Capcom	Yes	Yes	Yes	Yes	
Resident Evil: Dead Aim	PlayStation 2	February 13, 2003	Cavia	Yes	Yes	Yes	Yes	
Resident Evil: Deadly Silence	Nintendo DS	January 19, 2006	Capcom	Yes	Yes	Yes	Yes	
Resident Evil: Degeneration	iOS	2008	Capcom	Yes	Yes	Yes	Yes	
Resident Evil: Director's Cut	PlayStation	September 25, 1997	Capcom	Yes	Yes	Yes	Yes	
Resident Evil: Director's Cut Dual Shock Version	PlayStation	August 6, 1998	Capcom	Yes	Yes			
Resident Evil Gaiden	Game Boy Color	December 14, 2001	Capcom/M4	Yes	Yes	Yes	Yes	
Resident Evil: Operation Raccoon City	PlayStation 3	March 20, 2012	Slant Six Games/Capcom	Yes	Yes	Yes	Yes	
Resident Evil: Operation Raccoon City	Xbox 360	March 20, 2012	Slant Six Games/Capcom	Yes	Yes	Yes	Yes	
Resident Evil: Operation Raccoon City	Microsoft Windows	May 18, 2012	Slant Six Games/Capcom	Yes	Yes	Yes	Yes	
Resident Evil Outbreak	PlayStation 2	December 11, 2003	Capcom	Yes	Yes	Yes	Yes	
Resident Evil Outbreak File #2	PlayStation 2	September 9, 2004	Capcom	Yes	Yes	Yes	Yes	
Resident Evil Portable	PlayStation Portable	Cancelled	Capcom					
Resident Evil Requiem	PlayStation 5	February 27, 2026	Capcom	Yes	Yes	Yes	Yes	
Resident Evil Requiem	Xbox Series X/S	February 27, 2026	Capcom	Yes	Yes	Yes	Yes	
Resident Evil Requiem	Nintendo Switch 2	February 27, 2026	Capcom	Yes	Yes	Yes	Yes	
Resident Evil Requiem	Microsoft Windows	February 27, 2026	Capcom	Yes	Yes	Yes	Yes	
Resident Evil: Revelations	Nintendo 3DS	January 26, 2012	Capcom	Yes	Yes	Yes		
Resident Evil: Revelations 2	PlayStation 3	February 24, 2015	Capcom	Yes	Yes	Yes		
Resident Evil: Revelations 2	PlayStation 4	February 24, 2015	Capcom	Yes	Yes	Yes		
Resident Evil: Revelations 2	Microsoft Windows	February 25, 2015	Capcom	Yes	Yes	Yes	Yes	
Resident Evil: Revelations 2	Xbox 360	February 25, 2015	Capcom	Yes	Yes	Yes	Yes	
Resident Evil: Revelations 2	Xbox One	February 25, 2015	Capcom	Yes	Yes	Yes	Yes	
Resident Evil: Revelations 2	PlayStation Vita	August 18, 2015	Capcom	Yes	Yes	Yes	Yes	
Resident Evil: Revelations 2	Nintendo Switch	November 28, 2017	Capcom	Yes	Yes	Yes	Yes	
Resident Evil: Revelations Unveiled Edition	Microsoft Windows	May 21, 2013	Capcom	Yes	Yes	Yes		
Resident Evil: Revelations Unveiled Edition	PlayStation 3	May 21, 2013	Capcom	Yes	Yes	Yes		
Resident Evil: Revelations Unveiled Edition	Wii U	May 21, 2013	Capcom	Yes	Yes	Yes		
Resident Evil: Revelations Unveiled Edition	Xbox 360	May 21, 2013	Capcom	Yes	Yes	Yes		
Resident Evil: Revelations Unveiled Edition	PlayStation 4	August 31, 2017	Capcom	Yes	Yes	Yes		
Resident Evil: Revelations Unveiled Edition	Xbox One	August 31, 2017	Capcom	Yes	Yes	Yes		
Resident Evil: Revelations Unveiled Edition	Nintendo Switch	November 28, 2017	Capcom	Yes	Yes	Yes	Yes	
Resident Evil Survivor	PlayStation	January 27, 2000	TOSE	Yes	Yes	Yes		
Resident Evil Survivor 2 Code: Veronica	PlayStation 2	November 8, 2001	Capcom	Yes		Yes		
Resident Evil: The Darkside Chronicles	Wii	November 17, 2009	Capcom/Cavia	Yes	Yes	Yes	Yes	
Resident Evil: The Darkside Chronicles	PlayStation Network	June 26, 2012	Capcom/Cavia	Yes	Yes	Yes		
Resident Evil: The Mercenaries 3D	Nintendo 3DS	June 2, 2011	Capcom/TOSE	Yes	Yes	Yes	Yes	
Resident Evil: The Umbrella Chronicles	Wii	November 13, 2007	Capcom/Cavia	Yes	Yes	Yes	Yes	
Resident Evil: The Umbrella Chronicles	PlayStation Network	June 26, 2012	Capcom/Cavia	Yes	Yes	Yes		
Resident Evil: Veronica	Microsoft Windows	2027	Capcom	Coming	Coming	Coming	Coming	
Resident Evil: Veronica	PlayStation 5	2027	Capcom	Coming	Coming	Coming	Coming	
Resident Evil: Veronica	Xbox Series X/S	2027	Capcom	Coming	Coming	Coming	Coming	
Resident Evil: Veronica	Nintendo Switch 2	2027	Capcom	Coming	Coming	Coming	Coming	
Resident Evil Village	Microsoft Windows	May 7, 2021	Capcom	Yes	Yes	Yes	Yes	
Resident Evil Village	PlayStation 4	May 7, 2021	Capcom	Yes	Yes	Yes	Yes	
Resident Evil Village	PlayStation 5	May 7, 2021	Capcom	Yes	Yes	Yes	Yes	
Resident Evil Village	Xbox One	May 7, 2021	Capcom	Yes	Yes	Yes	Yes	
Resident Evil Village	Xbox Series X/S	May 7, 2021	Capcom	Yes	Yes	Yes	Yes	
Resident Evil Zero	GameCube	November 12, 2002	Capcom	Yes	Yes	Yes	Yes	
Resident Evil Zero	Wii	July 10, 2008	Capcom	Yes	Yes	Yes	Yes	
Resident Evil Zero	Microsoft Windows	January 19, 2016	Capcom	Yes	Yes	Yes	Yes	
Resident Evil Zero	PlayStation 3	January 19, 2016	Capcom	Yes	Yes	Yes	Yes	
Resident Evil Zero	PlayStation 4	January 19, 2016	Capcom	Yes	Yes	Yes	Yes	
Resident Evil Zero	Xbox 360	January 19, 2016	Capcom	Yes	Yes	Yes	Yes	
Resident Evil Zero	Xbox One	January 19, 2016	Capcom	Yes	Yes	Yes	Yes	
Resident Evil Zero	Nintendo Switch	May 21, 2019	Capcom	Yes	Yes	Yes	Yes	
Rival Schools: United By Fate	Arcade	November 1997	Capcom	Yes	Yes	Yes	Yes	
Rival Schools: United By Fate	PlayStation	July 30, 1998	Capcom	Yes	Yes	Yes		
Rival Schools: United By Fate	PlayStation Network	February 23, 2012	Capcom	Yes				
Rocketmen: Axis of Evil	PlayStation Network	March 6, 2008	A.C.R.O.N.Y.M. Games/Eyerisk Studios	Yes	Yes	Yes	Yes	
Rocketmen: Axis of Evil	Xbox Live Marketplace	March 5, 2008	A.C.R.O.N.Y.M. Games/Eyerisk Studios	Yes	Yes	Yes	Yes	
Rockman & Forte Mirai kara no Chosensha	WonderSwan	October 21, 1999	Layup Co., Ltd.	Yes				
Rockman Battle & Fighters	Neo Geo Pocket Color	July 26, 2000	Capcom	Yes				
Rockman Complete Works: Rockman	PlayStation	August 4, 1999	Capcom	Yes				
Rockman Complete Works: Rockman 2 Dr. Wily no Nazo!!	PlayStation	August 4, 1999	Capcom	Yes				
Rockman Complete Works: Rockman 3 Dr. Wily no Saigo!?	PlayStation	August 4, 1999	Capcom	Yes				
Rockman Complete Works: Rockman 4 Aratanaru Yabou!!	PlayStation	August 4, 1999	Capcom	Yes				
Rockman Complete Works: Rockman 5 Blues no Wana!	PlayStation	August 4, 1999	Capcom	Yes				
Rockman Complete Works: Rockman 6 Shijou Saidai no Tatakai!!	PlayStation	August 4, 1999	Capcom	Yes				
Rockman EXE N1 Battle	WonderSwan Color	August 8, 2003	Inti Creates/Capcom	Yes				
Rockman EXE Operate Shooting Star	Nintendo DS	November 12, 2009	Capcom	Yes				
Rockman EXE WS	WonderSwan Color	February 8, 2003	Tose	Yes				
Rockman IQ Challenge	Microsoft Windows	1998	Capcom	Yes				
