= Onimusha Blade Warriors =

2003 video game

- North American box art
- Developer: Capcom
- Publisher: Capcom
- Director: Hideki Miyake
- Producer: Jun Takeuchi
- Artists: Hayato Kaji; Keita Amemiya; Takashi Yamazaki
- Composer: Shinichiro Sato
- Series: Onimusha
- Platform: PlayStation 2
- Release: JP: November 27, 2003; NA: March 23, 2004; PAL: June 4, 2004
- Genre: Fighting
- Mode: Multiplayer

Onimusha Blade Warriors (Note: Japanese: 鬼武者 無頼伝, Hepburn: Onimusha Buraiden) is a 2003 fighting game developed and published by Capcom for the PlayStation 2. A spin-off of the Onimusha series, Blade Warriors is a 2D platform fighter featuring many of the characters of the Onimusha franchise.

Players may use standard sword fighting with combos, blocks, block-breaking kicks, jump, switch planes (the different levels of the fighting area), use various items, and disarm their opponents. It also includes the original aspects of the Onimusha series, including the absorption of souls and special elemental attacks (lightning, fire, and wind). The story takes place months after the events in Onimusha 2 and before the events in Onimusha 3.

== Characters ==
=== Onimusha characters ===
- Samanosuke Akechi - a protagonist samurai from Onimusha: Warlords. A warrior who wields the Oni Gauntlet, he disappeared mysteriously after defeating Fortinbras at Gifu Castle. Once again he has set out to defeat the demons with his Oni power.
- Kaede - a female ninja from Onimusha: Warlords, she fought the demons with Samanosuke and searched for his whereabouts after the battle at Gifu Castle. Kaede will throw herself into the heat of battle no matter what the risk to life and limb.
- Keijiro Maeda - Yumemaru from Onimusha: Warlords ten years later, he is also known as Maeda Keiji. Famous eccentric swordsman, his gaudy dress conceals a warm heart. Rumored to have originally come from China, he wields a giant Nagamaki in battle.
- Grunt - this nameless warrior wanders battlegrounds in hopes of an opportunity to raise his stature. Lucky for him he rarely has a break from war, or he would realize how bleak his future is.
- Jubei Yagyu - a protagonist samurai from Onimusha 2: Samurai's Destiny, Oni blood flows through the veins of this mighty swordsman. He defeated the Demon Lord Nobunaga in the name of justice. He settled down at home until hearing that demons were on the move.
- Oyu of Odani - a swordswoman from Onimusha 2 and Nobunaga's younger sister, she fights alongside Jubei to defeat her monstrous brother. After many fierce battles, she has returned to her home castle to find some tranquillity.
- Kotaro Fuma - a ninja from Onimusha 2, he is a young leader of the Fuma ninja gang who serve the Houjyou family. Fought with Jubei against Nobunaga, he uses his masterful reconnaissance techniques to provide Jubei with intelligence.
- Ekei Ankokuji - a warrior monk from Onimusha 2 and a spear master of the Hozoin School. This monk with a taste for wine and women is still a top-class fighter with a sharp mind. He has served the Mouri family since the battle with the demons.
- Magoichi Saiga - a gun trooper from Onimusha 2 and the head gunner of the Kishu-Saiga gun team. Although he is trying to protect his homeland he hates Ekei.
- Gargant - an unknown warrior of the Genma, he is seen in Onimusha 3: Demon Siege and Onimusha: Dawn of Dreams. He first swore his allegiance to the nefarious demon lord Fortinbras. After the demise of Fortinbras, he had yielded his position as the righthand man under the new Genma Lord, Oda Nobunaga.
- Marcellus - a demon boss from Onimusha: Warlords. He was once an Oni Warrior that converted into a Genma through Guildenstern's experimentation. This engineered demon, created from materials fetched from the Cave of Treachery, is Guildenstern's pride and joy. He wields a weapon resembling the Oni Gauntlet on his right arm.
- Gogandantess - self-proclaimed "The greatest swordsman of all demons" in Onimusha 2.
- Jujudormah - a demon boss from Onimusha 2 and self-proclaimed 'most beautiful' concubine of Genma Lord Oda Nobunaga. A combination of cunning mind and ferocious nature makes Jujudormah as one of the most feared demons. Confident of her looks, she has an interest in the Demon Lord Nobunaga.
- Zombie Warrior - a demon grunt from Onimusha: Warlords and the first of Guildenstern's engineered demons. This zombie makes up for his lack of intelligence with a powerful instinct to seek out and destroy life.
- Three Eyes - a demon ninja from Onimusha: Warlords, this engineered demon was modeled after a ninja. Highly athletic, his agility far exceeds normal human levels. He can be spotted by his three eerily glowing eyes.
- Nobunaga Oda - the demon lord who appeared in Onimusha: Warlords, Onimusha 2: Samurai's Destiny and Onimusha 3: Demon Siege. He wants to rule over the entire world with his Genma Army.

=== Hidden characters ===
- MegaMan.EXE - the protagonist of the Mega Man Battle Network series.
- Zero - originally from the Mega Man X series, he is displayed in his Mega Man Zero incarnation.
- Kojiro Sasaki - the archrival of Miyamoto Musashi, killed by him on Ganryujima Island.
- Musashi Miyamoto - the best-known swordmaster.
- Juju-Ran - a younger and more attractive version of Jujudormah. She has her magical parasol but wields a blade instead of her umbrella.
- Jaido - the reptilian demons fought in Onimusha 2. They can be unlocked by leveling up the Zombie character.
- Musaid/Giramusaid - can be unlocked by leveling up Three Eyes. Both of them have 2 glowing red eyes instead of 3 glowing green ones.

== Music ==
The game's music was written primarily by Shinichiro Sato, with additional compositions from Sega's Masaru Setsumaru, Hideki Abe, Yutaka Minobe, Hideaki Kobayashi, Junko Shiratsu, and Tomonori Sawada.

== Reception ==
Reception

Aggregate score
Aggregator	Score
Metacritic	65/100

Review scores
Publication	Score
Edge	6/10
Electronic Gaming Monthly	7.17/10 (Note: Two critics of Electronic Gaming Monthly gave the game each a score of 7/10, and the other gave it 7.5/10.)
Famitsu	29/40
Game Informer	8/10
GameRevolution	C−
GameSpot	6.6/10
GameSpy	2/5
GameZone	8/10
IGN	7/10
Official U.S. PlayStation Magazine	2.5/5
X-Play	2/5
Playboy	50%
The Times	3/5

The game received "mixed" reviews according to the review aggregation website Metacritic. In Japan, Famitsu gave it a score of one eight and three sevens for a total of 29 out of 40. Atomic Dawg of GamePro gave a positive review to the game, commending the selection of characters to choose in several modes, "sharp" graphics, "tight" controls, gameplay, sound, and replay value. The reviewer said that the fans of Onimusha will appreciate the title, as well as fans of fighting games in general. (Note: GamePro gave the game 4/5 for graphics, sound, control, and fun factor.)
