= Onimusha =

Video game series

- The logo of Onimusha: Warlords, the first game in the series. Subsequent titles use similar logos.
- Genres: Action-adventure; Hack and slash; Action role-playing
- Developer: Capcom
- Publisher: Capcom
- Creator: Yoshiki Okamoto
- Platforms: Android; Game Boy Advance; iOS; Microsoft Windows; Nintendo Switch; Nintendo Switch 2; PlayStation 2; PlayStation 3; PlayStation 4; PlayStation 5; Xbox; Xbox One; Xbox Series X/S
- First release: Onimusha: Warlords; January 25, 2001
- Latest release: Onimusha: Way of the Sword; September 4, 2026

Onimusha (鬼武者; 'Oni Warrior') is a series of action-adventure video games developed and published by Capcom. It makes use of the historic figures that shaped Japan's history, retelling their stories with supernatural elements. Most of the games are of the action-adventure genre, a combination of third-person hack-and-slash combat and puzzle elements. The player protagonist wields the power of the Oni, enabling them to fight the Genma, the main enemy in the series. As of September 2026, the series has sold a total of 10 million copies worldwide, making it Capcom's tenth best-selling franchise.

== Games ==
Release timeline
2001	Onimusha: Warlords
2002	Genma Onimusha
2002	Onimusha 2: Samurai's Destiny
2003	Onimusha Tactics
2003	Onimusha Blade Warriors
2004	Onimusha 3: Demon Siege
2005	Shin Onimusha: Curtain of Darkness
2006	Onimusha: Dawn of Dreams
2007
2008
2009
2010
2011
2012	Onimusha Soul
2013
2014
2015
2016
2017
2018	Onimusha: Warlords (remaster)
2019
2020
2021
2022
2023
2024
2025	Onimusha VR: Shadow Team
2025	Onimusha 2: Samurai's Destiny (remaster)
2026	Onimusha: Way of the Sword

The series originated in 1997, with Yoshiki Okamoto's idea to create Sengoku Biohazard, a ninja version of Capcom's own 1996 Resident Evil (known as Biohazard in Japan), set in the Sengoku period and featuring a "ninja house" filled with booby traps, similar to the mansion from Resident Evil, where battles are fought using swords and shuriken. The project was originally intended for the Nintendo 64's 64DD.

Onimusha: Warlords began development for the original PlayStation, but the project was eventually moved to the PlayStation 2 and was released in 2001. The half-finished PS1 version of Onimusha was scrapped and never released.

The series was initially planned to be only a trilogy, but a fourth installment, Onimusha: Dawn of Dreams was released in 2006. Keiji Inafune said that Onimusha 3: Demon Siege is the end of the Nobunaga storyline, and Onimusha: Dawn of Dreams is a new storyline.

Shin Onimusha: Curtain Of Darkness, a mobile phone game, was released in Japan in 2005. Onimusha Soul, a browser-based game, was released on June 28, 2012. The game was also released for mobile phones in July 2013 and for PlayStation 3's PlayStation Network on February 25, 2014. The mobile version was shut down on May 13, 2015.

A high-definition remaster of the first game, Onimusha: Warlords, was released in December 2018 for the Nintendo Switch, PlayStation 4, and Xbox One. A Windows version was released in January 2019. A remaster of the second game, Onimusha 2: Samurai's Destiny, was released on all four platforms in May 2025.

Onimusha VR: Shadow Team, the first VR entry in the Onimusha series, was released for Japanese arcades in March 2025.

Onimusha: Way of the Sword was announced at The Game Awards 2024 event in December and was released on September 4, 2026.

== Gameplay ==
Although the protagonist changes in every Onimusha title, he is always a skilled swordsman who embarks on a set mission which involves slaying demons and fearsome enemies during the waning years of the Sengoku period of feudal Japan. In each game, the protagonist has the ability to absorb Genma souls from defeated enemies, which help to restore health, infuse power in weapons and armor, and provide power for the elemental attacks of special weapons.

The player controls their character using the D-pad (although later games such as Onimusha 3: Demon Siege and Onimusha: Dawn of Dreams introduced analog stick control) and travels in a fairly linear method, able to rotate slowly with the input of an opposing direction. Characters tend to move slowly and can only slightly increase their speed with the dash maneuver by tapping twice in any direction. Actions common to many action-oriented games, such as jumping, grabbing, and climbing over obstacles, cannot be performed in Onimusha games.

Onimusha is action-oriented with an emphasis on combat, and employing some horror elements. The player has an arsenal of weaponry, ranging from katana to elemental-based broadswords. The player possesses a limited supply of spiritual energy which can be used for magical attacks. These magical attacks, which vary depending upon which weapon is equipped and other offensive attributes, can be improved throughout the game by accumulation of souls from defeated enemies.

== Plot ==
Based primarily throughout the Japanese Sengoku period, Onimusha: Warlords starts with the feudal lord Nobunaga Oda being killed during a battle. One of the prominent fighters, Hidemitsu Samanosuke Akechi, receives a letter from his cousin Princess Yuki who is concerned about servants from her castle disappearing. Samanosuke joins with the kunoichi Kaede to rescue Yuki and discover demonic creatures known as Genma. In order to defeat the Genma, the Oni clan grant Samanosuke powers from their kind. Across his fights Samanosuke discovers the Genma have resurrected Nobunaga into serving their needs while intending to sacrifice Yuki and an orphan named Yumemaru to grant him more powers. Samanosuke manages to save Yuki and Yumemaru and kills the Genma Lord, the God of Light Fortinbras. Samanosuke's group then takes different paths.

The sequel, Onimusha 2: Samurai's Destiny, has Nobunaga using the Genma in his forces to unify Japan, wiping out Yagyu village whose clan are Genma exterminators. The clan's only survivor, Jubei Yagyu, goes on a quest to avenge his clan while learning he inherited Oni powers from his mother as he uses them alongside the Oni's five orbs to battle Nobunaga's soldiers. Across his journey, Jubei meets several allies who also seek Nobunaga's life. Jubei manages to infiltrate Gifu castle and confronts Nobunaga alone. Although Jubei kills Nobunaga, the warlord's soul escapes and later reconstitutes himself. The spin-off Onimusha: Blade Warriors has the cast from Warlords and Samurai's Destiny in a new battle against Nobunaga's forces.

The third game, Onimusha 3: Demon Siege, has Samanosuke's clan attacking the Oda forces again. Before confronting Nobunaga, Samanosuke is transported to Modern Paris as a result of an experiment made by the Genma scientist Guildernstern to enable his kin to conquer more lands. In the meantime, service agent Jacques Blanc is a victim of Guildernstern while transported to Japan's Sengoku period. There, Jacques is granted Oni powers by an Oni who tells him to join forces with this timeline's Samanosuke and defeat Nobunaga if he wishes to return home. While Jacques aids Samanosuke in the past, in the future Samanosuke is helped by Jacques' family to investigate the Genma. In the end, the two Oni warriors are successful in stopping the invasion and returning to their respective times. Samanosuke manages to slay Nobunaga and seal his soul within the Oni Gauntlet to avoid another resurrection.

The fourth game, Onimusha: Dawn of Dreams, had Nobunaga's servant Hideyoshi Toyotomi unified Japan with the Genma whom he supported in their actions. His illegitimate son, Hideyasu "Soki" Yuki, goes on a quest to defeat Hideyoshi and stop the Genma. He is aided by several other warriors, including an elder Samanosuke who recognizes him as the Black Oni, the God of Darkness. After mastering his Oni powers, Soki joins with his friends to defeat Hideyoshi's army. In the aftermath, it is revealed that Hideyoshi was a mere puppet of the Genma Triumvirate who wish to resurrect Fortinbras at his full power as the Genmas' God of Light. Although the Genma Triumvirate and Hideyoshi are defeated, Fortinbras resurrects with Soki using the Oni Gauntlet to destroy the Genma and restore the country's peace at the cost of his life. Soon after, Samanosuke embarks on a quest to seal away the Oni Gauntlet to prevent Nobunaga from being released.

The fifth game, Onimusha: Way of the Sword follows a new storyline, featuring Miyamoto Musashi, a ronin who is killed by Genma with his longtime rival, Sasaki Ganryu. Both are revived and given Oni Gauntlets by Minamoto no Yoshitsune, a deceased Onimusha turned evil. During his quest to fully revive as a human and stop Yoshitsune's plans, Musashi is aided by the spirit of Shizuka Gozen, an Oni and Yoshitsune's former wife who resides on his gauntlet, a 700 year old Onimusha called Ono no Takamura and his apprentice Izumo no Okuni, as well as the occasional help of the spirit of Murasaki Shikibu. With help from the mysterious Dokyo, Yoshitsune returns to the world of living by absorbing the human souls Ganryu collected in order to become stronger, but is destroyed by Musashi. Afterwards, Shizuka returns to the afterlife, while Musashi manages to fully ressurrect and embarks on a journey to track down Dokyo and Ganryu, who are still at large.

== Main characters ==
Samanosuke Akechi (明智 左馬之介 秀満 Akechi Samanosuke Hidemitsu), later also known under the moniker Tenkai Nankōbō during his appearance in Onimusha: Dawn of Dreams, is the main protagonist of the Onimusha series, particularly in the first and third installments: Onimusha: Warlords and Onimusha 3: Demon Siege. He also appears as a supporting playable character in the fourth game Onimusha: Dawn of Dreams, and as one of the combatants in Onimusha: Blade Warriors. He is loosely based on the historical figure, Akechi Hidemitsu. His in-game model is based and voiced by Takeshi Kaneshiro. Samanosuke is the only character to appear in all four mainline Onimusha games. He appears in Onimusha 2 in a flashback drawing.

Jūbei Yagyū is the main protagonist of Onimusha 2: Samurai's Destiny. As the first leader of the Yagyū clan seen in the series and originator of Shin-in style sword combat, he was born as Sougen but later given the name Jūbei as a child, a tradition which would continue as seen with his granddaughter. His father was the late Head of the Yagyū clan, who was seduced and had a child by a woman who disappeared shortly thereafter. Jūbei never knew his mother, but does meet his mother during the events of Samurai's Destiny. His in-game character is modeled after late Japanese actor Matsuda Yusaku.

Hideyasu "Sōki" Yūki is the main protagonist in Onimusha: Dawn of Dreams. He is the biological son of Ieyasu Tokugawa and a warrior who possesses the dark power of the Oni. He goes by many names besides Sōki and Hideyasu Yuki: Blue Demon and Oni of the Ash. Having Lamentation, his prized broadsword he learned about Hideyoshi's insidious scheme, he sets out on a journey to burn the Genma trees and defeat the Genma running rampant across the land. He is the first Onimusha main character to not be modeled after an actor. He is also the only main character to be killed, dying at the end of Dawn of Dreams after sacrificing himself to destroy the Oni Star. Soki has appeared as a playable character in Tatsunoko vs. Capcom.

Miyamoto Musashi (宮本 武蔵) is the protagonist of Onimusha: Way of the Sword and a Ronin killed by Genma and revived as an Onimusha. Historically, he was a Japanese swordsman, strategist, artist, and writer who became renowned through stories of his unique double-bladed swordsmanship and undefeated record in his 62 duels. He is modeled after late Japanese actor Toshiro Mifune.

Jacques Blanc is one of two main protagonists (the other being Samanosuke Akechi) in Onimusha 3: Demon Siege. Working as a policeman, he is the first Westerner who wields the Oni Power, originating from France. He is modeled after French actor Jean Reno.

Nobunaga Oda (織田信長) is the main antagonist of the Onimusha series, in particular Onimusha 2: Samurai's Destiny and Onimusha 3: Demon Siege, where he is the final boss in those two games. In real world history, Nobunaga is viewed culturally as both a hero and as a villain for respectively trying to unite his nation during the Sengoku Period and the horrific lengths he took to achieve his goal. In this timeline he forms an alliance with the demons for power and to conquer Japan. Despite being killed at the beginning of Onimusha: Warlords, he returns as a demon. He battles Jubei at the end of Samurai's Destiny but due to Jubei not having an Oni Gauntlet to seal his soul, his death was only temporary. He returns in Demon Siege after being revived by the demons again. He is finally killed by Samanosuke and sealed in his Oni Gauntlet.

Fortinbras (フォーティンブラス), also referred to as the "God of Light", is the overarching antagonist of the Onimusha series, depicted as the king and most powerful of all Genma. He appears as the final boss in Onimusha: Warlords and Onimusha: Dawn of Dreams. In Dawn of Dreams he is revealed to have two forms, a human form and a serpent form. He is finally killed by Soki after Soki sacrifices himself to stop the Omen Star.

Hideyoshi Toyotomi (豊臣 秀吉) is the secondary antagonist of the Onimusha series. Historically, Hideyoshi is the most famous peasant-samurai in Japan as he rose from being a vassal of Nobunaga Oda to the man who united Japan with his short-lived reign as regent. He is the main antagonist of Onimusha: Dawn of Dreams.

Minamoto no Yoshitsune (源 義経) is the main antagonist of Onimusha: Way of the Sword. In the game he is depicted as a former Onimusha who turned against the Oni people and led them to almost extinction but ends up killed and trapped in Hell. During the events of the game, Yoshitsune manipulates enemies and allies alike in order to escape Hell and attain ultimate power but ends up destroyed by Musashi. Historically, Yoshitsune was a Japanese samurai commander of the Minamoto clan of Japan in the late Heian and early Kamakura periods who contributed the most for his brother Minamoto no Yoritomo to become the first shogun of the Kamakura shogunate, but fell from grace after becoming Yoritomo's enemy and ultimately committed suicide after losing all support.

== Reception ==
Aggregate review scores As of August 31, 2026.
Game	Metacritic
Onimusha: Warlords	(PS2) 86 (Xbox) 83
Onimusha 2: Samurai's Destiny	(PS2) 84
Onimusha 3: Demon Siege	(PS2) 85 (PC) 69
Onimusha: Dawn of Dreams	(PS2) 81
Onimusha: Way of the Sword	(NS2) 90 (PS5) 85 (XSX) 83 (PC) 82

The Onimusha series has received overall positive reviews with most of the main games on the PlayStation 2, receiving average scores of more than 80%. As a comparison, most spin-offs from the series have not been as successful. The titles have influenced other games from the company including Devil May Cry, Shadow of Rome and Resident Evil 4. The samurai game Genji: Dawn of the Samurai was cited by Inafune as an "Onimusha clone" although its designer Yoshiki Okamoto denied such statement.

The series has often been compared with the Resident Evil series and has been praised for its focus in action. The first two games, however, were criticized for forcing the player to use the Directional Pad rather than the left analogue to make the playable character to move. This issue was solved with the third release which generated a good response. Another subject of criticism is the length of each game with opinions sometimes differing due to the replay value they offer. Yoshinori Ono acknowledged the third game's short length and thus made Dawn of Dreams become the series' longest title.

The original game was a major hit on the PS2, becoming the console's first game to sell over a million copies. While Onimusha 2 was also a best-selling title Capcom noticed how it did poorly in European regions. The third and fourth titles received less favorable sales with Keiji Inafune addressing people's concerns about how the former game did not feel like a samurai story while various gaming journalists noted the latter was overshadowed by next generation consoles. As of September 2026, the series has sold 10 million copies to date.

== Adaptations ==
=== Canceled film ===
In May 2003, Paramount Pictures, Davis Films and Gaga Productions announced its joint venture to adapt the Onimusha game series into a $50 million live-action feature film. According to Paramount and Davis Films' Samuel Hadida: "It's samurai fighting against demons – it's very close to this simple pitch. There's also a love story woven in. It's a big adventure movie with lots of special effects". He also proposed the possibility of a film franchise.

In December 2006, director Christophe Gans said that he had Onimusha lined up to film. The film, budgeted at over $70 million, was to begin production in China in February 2008 for a December 2009 release. Takeshi Kaneshiro was rumored to be in the film, reprising his role as Samanosuke. Hadida had to delay the filming of Onimusha, which has resulted in the film's Japanese cast working on other film projects during the delay, and being unavailable to start filming Onimusha. These factors meant that Gans would direct an adaptation of Leo Perutz's novel The Swedish Cavalier first. Satomi Ishihara and Tsuyoshi Ihara remained attached to the project. There has been no further news regarding this film since 2007, and any plans for a live-action film were quietly canceled.

=== Anime series ===
An anime series adaptation was released in November 2023. It was produced by Sublimation and directed by Shin'ya Sugai, with Takashi Miike as chief director. The main character, Musashi Miyamoto, is modeled after Toshiro Mifune and voiced by Akio Otsuka, who previously portrayed Nobunaga Oda in the video games.
