= Hideyuki Fukasawa =

Japanese composer (born 1970)

Hideyuki Fukasawa 深澤 秀行
- Born: November 30, 1970 (age 55); Tokyo, Japan
- Genre: Soundtrack
- Occupations: Composer; arranger
- Instruments: Synthesizer

Hideyuki Fukasawa (深澤 秀行, Fukasawa Hideyuki; born November 30, 1970) is a Japanese composer, best known for his work on the video game Street Fighter IV.

== Career ==
Born in Tokyo, Fukasawa began learning piano when he was in elementary school. At the age of 10, he listened to the soundtrack of the anime film Swan Lake, which led him to be influenced by the Russian composer Pyotr Ilyich Tchaikovsky. When in high school, Fukasawa began playing synthesizer, guitar, bass and drums. In 1991, he started his career as a synthesizer programmer. Since then, he has been involved in many works, mainly composing and arranging music for video game and anime. Fukasawa worked on the 2003 game Onimusha 2: Samurai's Destiny under lead composer Taro Iwashiro, sampling various traditional Japanese instruments for the soundtrack. His involvement in Onimusha 2 led to him being chosen as composer for Chaos Legion, which released the same year. Fukasawa would later serve as the in-game composer for Onimusha: Dawn of Dreams, which released in 2006, with Jamie Christopherson composing for the cutscenes. Fukasawa was influenced by Taro Iwashiro's compositions for Onimusha 2, and sought to create strong and rich melodies.

Fukasawa served as composer for Street Fighter IV, which released in 2009. Under the supervision of sound director Masayuki Endou, Fukasawa sought to modernise the music, with instrumental choices influenced by the cultural backgrounds of characters and stages. The arranging of old character themes put Fukasawa under pressure, as he was concerned on the arrangements' reception. Fukasawa composed for Tsukihime -A piece of blue glass moon- with Keita Haga, which released in August 2021. Fukasawa was approached following the production of Witch on the Holy Night, with Keita presenting him a demo of the main theme, which he then arranged. Fukasawa sought to create a soundtrack based on the keywords "urban," "modern", and "mysterious." He began by setting a tone, followed by adding layers to create a sonic palette and add depth.

Fukasawa served as composer for the anime adaptation of Gnosia, which aired in 2025. Fukasawa listened to the game's original soundtrack a year prior, and was entheusiastic about working on the anime. He aimed to expand the music in his own style while making sure to retain the atmosphere set by the game's score, resulting in a combination of arrangements and original pieces Fukasawa wrote from scratch. He also met original composer Q Flavor during a recording session in spring 2025, and expressed gratitude that Q Flavor warmly received his work.

== Works ==
=== Anime ===
Year	Title	Note(s)	Ref(s)
2006	Intrigue in the Bakumatsu – Irohanihoheto		
2007	You're Under Arrest: Full Throttle	Lead compositions; other compositions by Masala Nishid	
2008	Yatterman	Co-arrangement; lead compositions by Masayuki Yamamoto	
2011	Fullmetal Alchemist: The Sacred Star of Milos	Co-arrangement; lead compositions by Tarō Iwashiro	
2013	Vividred Operation		
2013	The Flowers of Evil		
2014	Fate/stay night: Unlimited Blade Works		
2017	Katsugeki/Touken Ranbu		
2018	Learn with Manga! Fate Grand/Order	Other compositions by Kegani	
2020	Fate/Grand Order – Divine Realm of the Round Table: Camelot	Co-arrangement; lead compositions by Keita Haga	
2022	Orient		
2022	Tokyo 24th Ward		
2025	Gnosia		
2026	Witch on the Holy Night		

=== Video games ===
Year	Title	Note(s)	Ref(s)
2003	Onimusha 2: Samurai's Destiny	Assistant sound engineering; lead compositions by Tarō Iwashiro	
2003	Chaos Legion	Other compositions by Toru Minami	
2006	Onimusha: Dawn of Dreams	In-game compositions; cutscene compositions by Jamie Christopherson	
2006	Dragon Ball Z: Budokai Tenkaichi 2	with Hiromi Mizutani, Kenji Fujisawa, Takanori Arima and Tadayoshi Makino	
2006	Mobile Suit Gundam: Target in Sight	Co-arrangement; lead compositions by Takanori Arima	
2007	Monster Hunter Frontier		
2009	Street Fighter IV		
2010	Super Street Fighter IV		
2011	Marvel vs. Capcom 3: Fate of Two Worlds		
2011	Ultimate Marvel vs. Capcom 3		
2012	Street Fighter X Tekken		
2012	Witch on the Holy Night	Lead composer; other compositions by James Harris, Keita Haga, and hil	
2014	Ultra Street Fighter IV		
2016	Street Fighter V	Other compositions by Masahiro Aoiki, Keiki Kobayashi, Takatsugu Wakabayashi and Zac Zinger	
2021	Tsukihime -A piece of blue glass moon-	Other compositions by Keita Haga	
