= Akechi Hidemitsu =

Japanese samurai

- 明智 秀満
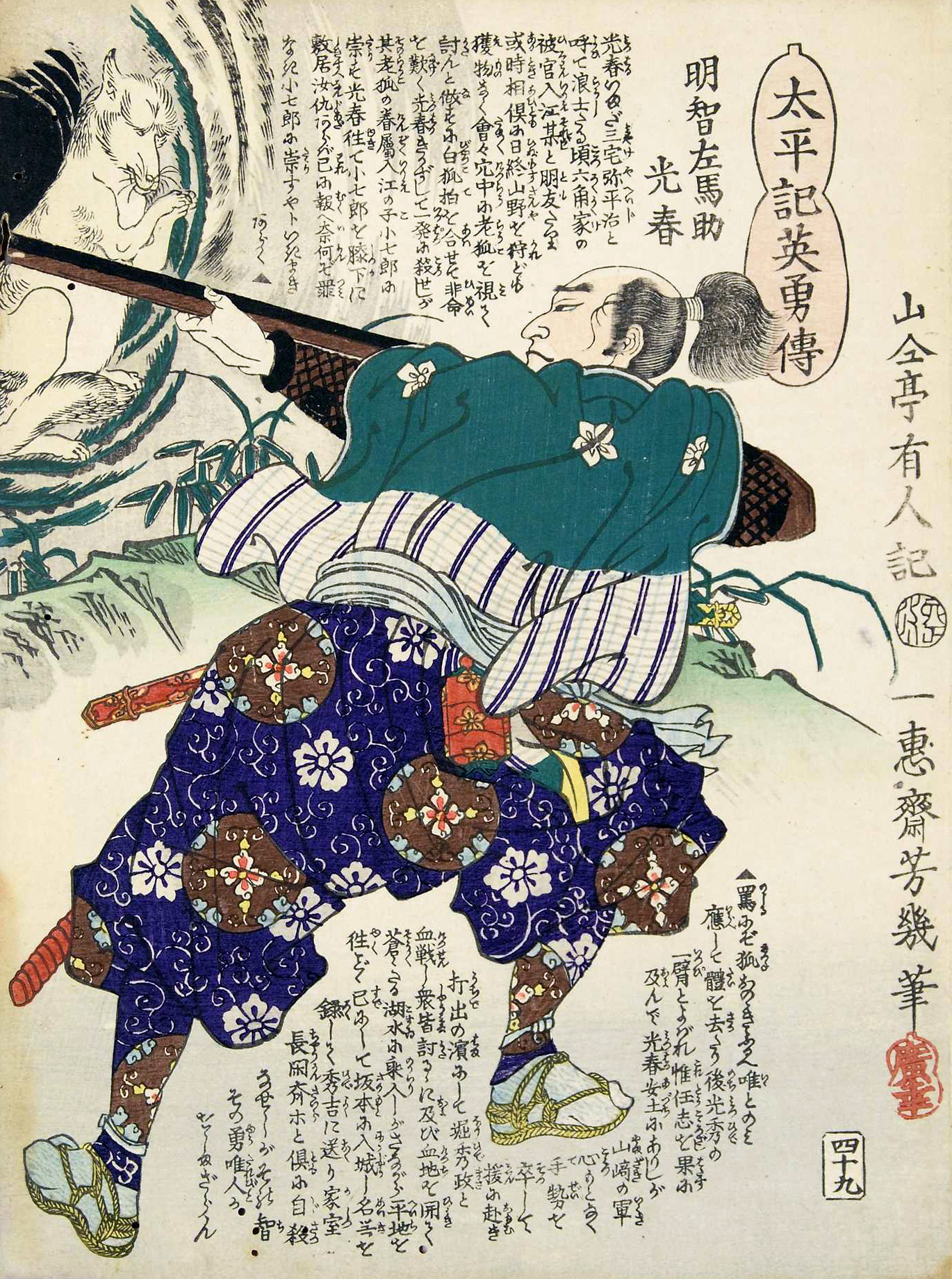
- Portrait of Akechi Hidemitsu from Utagawa Yoshiiku's Heroes of the Taiheiki

Lord of Fukuchiyama Castle
- In office 1576–1582

Personal details
- Born: 1536 Mikawa Province
- Died: July 4, 1582 (aged 45–46) Sakamoto Castle
- Nickname: Rokurōzaemon

Military service
- Allegiance: Oda clan Akechi clan
- Commands: Fukuchiyama Castle
- Battles/wars: Tanba Campaign (1575); Honnoji Incident (1582); Battle of Yamazaki (1582)

Akechi Hidemitsu (明智 秀満; 1536? - July 4, 1582) was a Japanese samurai of the Sengoku period. A senior retainer of Oda Nobunaga's vassal Akechi Mitsuhide, he served Mitsuhide until the latter's death in 1582 at the hands of Toyotomi Hideyoshi. He is also known as Akechi Mitsuharu.

== Early life and family ==
While Hidemitsu's date of birth is not known for certain, he was born either sometime between 1535 and 1537, or as late as 1557. Hidemitsu was the son of Tōyama Kageyuki (lord of Myōchi Castle) and Miyake Takasada (lord of Hirose Castle in Mikawa Province). He first succeeded to his father, taking the name Tōyama Kageharu (common name Rokurōzaemon); then he succeeded to his mother's birth family under the name Miyake Yaheiji, and then, marrying one of Akechi Mitsuhide's daughters, took the name Akechi Hidemitsu.

== Service to Mitsuhide and death ==
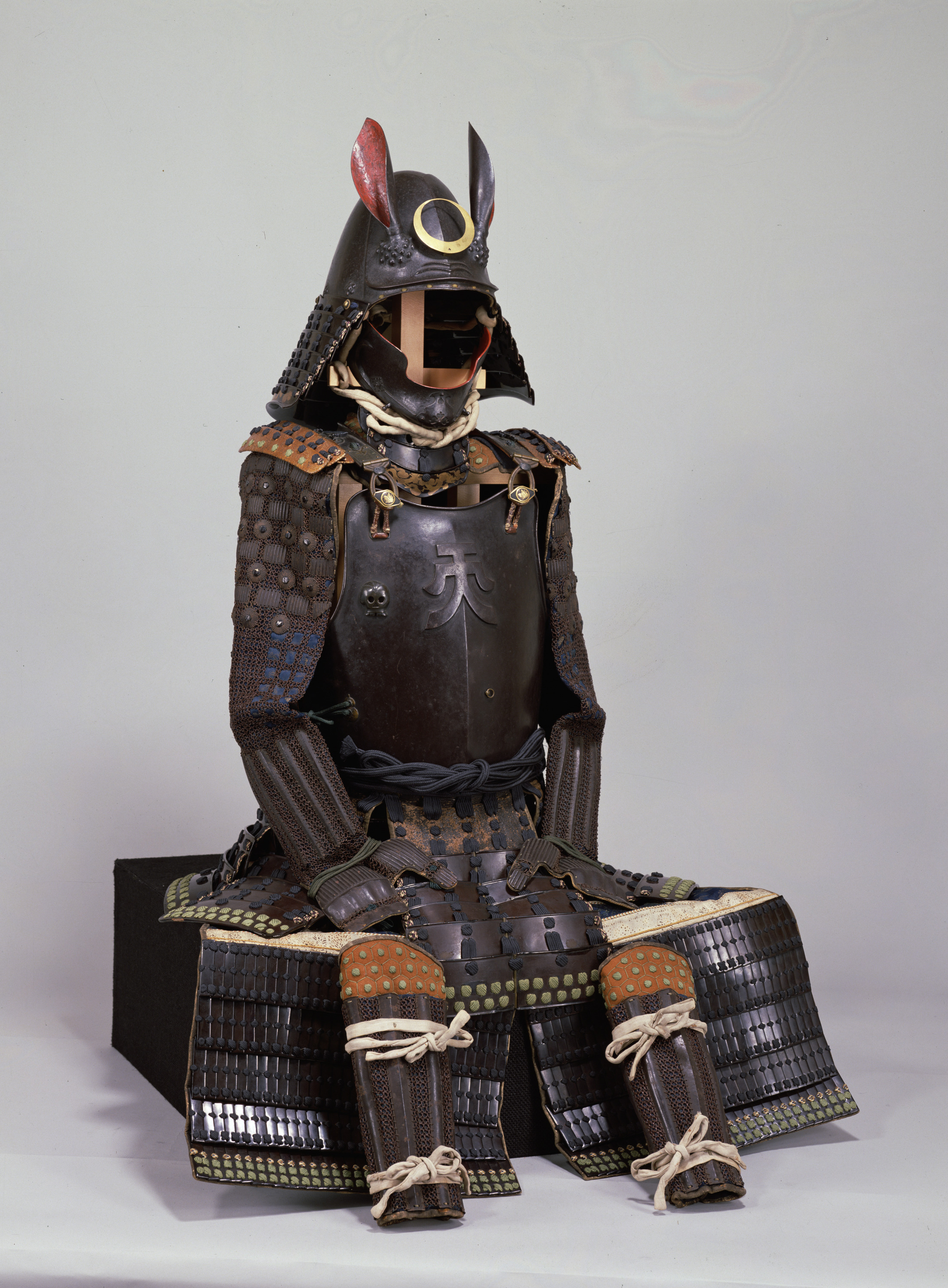
Akechi Hidemitsu's Nanban dou gusoku (western style gusoku), Azuchi-Momoyama or Edo period, 16th - 17th century, Tokyo National Museum

Following his marriage to Akechi Mitsuhide's daughter (who had been formerly married to Araki Murashige), Hidemitsu was deeply trusted by his master, and served in the vanguard of the Akechi armies frequently. He led the attack on Battle of Honnō-ji which killed Oda Nobunaga.

He was assigned to defend the Azuchi Castle and fought against Hori Hidemasa as a rear guard for Mitsuhide during the Battle of Yamazaki. He became a legend for his rapid crossing of Lake Biwa to get from Otsu to Sakamoto Castle on the back of his famous horse "Okage", after the loss and defeat of Mitsuhide's forces at Battle of Yamazaki. This scene is very often depicted in many Japanese artworks. He then performed his famous and unpredicted act of committing hara-kiri while writing a poem on a door with blood from his abdomen used as ink for his brush. His men set fire to Sakamoto Castle and killed their families and themselves to follow their master to the grave.

While much of the Akechi clan was destroyed at Sakamoto Castle, Hidemitsu's sons Miyake Shigetoshi and Tōyama Tarōgorō survived. Shigetoshi served Terasawa Katataka at the Shimabara Uprising and was killed by the rebel forces under Amakusa Shirō, while Tarōgorō is remembered as the ancestor of the famous nineteenth-century political activist Sakamoto Ryōma.

== Modern References ==
Hidemitsu appears in the Onimusha series with the name Samanosuke Akechi. After the events of Onimusha 3: Demon Siege, he takes on the name Tenkai Nankobo in Onimusha: Dawn of Dreams. "Sama-no-suke" (左馬之介) was Hidemitsu's courtesy title at the Imperial Court.
