= Onimusha Tactics =

2003 video game

- Developer: Capcom
- Publisher: Capcom
- Director: Fumihiro Asami
- Producer: Yuichi Kobayashi
- Composer: Keiji Yamagishi
- Series: Onimusha
- Platform: Game Boy Advance
- Release: JP: 25 July 2003; NA: 11 November 2003; EU: 5 December 2003
- Genre: Tactical role-playing
- Mode: Single-player

Onimusha Tactics (Note: Japanese: 鬼武者タクティクス, Hepburn: Onimusha Takutikusu) is a 2003 tactical role-playing game developed and published by Capcom for the Game Boy Advance. A spin-off of the Onimusha series, it was the first game in the series to be released for a Nintendo system. It does not follow the storyline of the previous PlayStation 2 games and is considered a side story, but it features a similar plot: a samurai who possesses the Oni Gauntlet can become the Onimusha and fights against Nobunaga and his army of genma.

== Gameplay ==
The player is presented with a 3/4 camera view of a detailed gridded battlefield. The point of the game is to defeat the opposing team of opponents and improve the player character with experience points gained in battle by defeating enemies. Such statistics include strength, which dictates attack power, speed which decides turn order, and others. The game allows the player to equip their warrior with katanas, spears, and other weapons.

== Characters ==
The samurai is Onimaru, who is supported by a wide range of characters, many of whom are the same as their PlayStation 2 equivalents. There are some returning characters from other Onimusha games such as Saika Magoichi, Ankokuji Ekei, Fūma Kotarō, and Akechi Mitsuhide. Onimaru battles the genma until the players ultimately reach the notorious Nobunaga. New to the series are additional chosen warriors who receive the power of the phoenix, tortoise, tiger and dragon to assist Onimaru. These animals correspond with the Chinese celestial animals that represent the Cardinal directions. This reference was also a puzzle in Onimusha 2: Samurai's Destiny.

== Reception ==
Reception

Aggregate score
Aggregator	Score
Metacritic	64/100

Review scores
Publication	Score
1Up.com	B−
Eurogamer	6/10
Famitsu	29/40
Game Informer	7/10
GameSpot	6.7/10
GameSpy	3/5
IGN	6.5/10
Nintendo Power	3.6/5
Nintendo World Report	5.5/10
RPGamer	2/10

Onimusha Tactics received "mixed" reviews, according to the review aggregation website Metacritic. In Japan, Famitsu gave it a score of 29 out of 40. Game Informer gave it an average review over a month before its U.S. release date. Rice Burner of GamePro was positive to the game's item generation system, the story and a characters. His reaction to the gameplay was mixed: while he noted that the players who are unfamiliar with strategy games will find the title easy to play and enjoyable, he also said that its simplistic game mechanics and a minimal learning curve will leave more experienced players "bored", in addition to his criticism of inability to customize the characters in the game. He was also critical of the cartoonish graphics that contrasted with the dark story. The reviewer ultimately called Onimusha Tactics a solid title and recommended it to the players who like casual strategy games. (Note: GamePro gave the game two 3/5 scores for graphics and sound, and two 3.5/5 scores for control and fun factor.)
