= Onimusha: Way of the Sword =

- Developer: Capcom
- Publisher: Capcom
- Director: Satoru Nihei
- Producers: Akihito Kadowaki; Koichi Shibata; Kosuke Tanaka
- Designers: Tatsuo Isoko; Katsuhiro Eguchi
- Programmer: Keita Konno
- Artists: Hiroyuki Nara; Hiroshi Yugen
- Writer: Hiroshi Yamashita
- Composers: Nozomi Ohmoto; Kota Suzuki; Tomoki Kameyama
- Series: Onimusha
- Engine: RE Engine
- Platforms: Nintendo Switch 2; PlayStation 5; Windows; Xbox Series X/S
- Release: September 4, 2026
- Genre: Action-adventure
- Mode: Single-player

Onimusha: Way of the Sword (鬼武者 Way of the Sword) is a 2026 action-adventure game developed and published by Capcom. As the first mainline installment in the Onimusha series since Onimusha: Dawn of Dreams (2006), the game was released on September 4, 2026 for Nintendo Switch 2, PlayStation 5, Windows, and Xbox Series X/S. The game received generally favorable reviews and sold 1 million copies on its launch day.

== Gameplay ==
Defeated enemies dropped "souls" which can be used to replenish health, buy upgrades and use special weapons.

Onimusha: Way of the Sword is an action-adventure video game played from a third-person perspective. The game follows a samurai named Miyamoto Musashi (modeled after Toshiro Mifune), as he explores a dark fantasy version of Kyoto during the Edo period and combats rival swordsmen, demons and other supernatural threats. Musashi's primary weapon of choice is a sword, which can be used to strike enemies, parry their attack, or deflect incoming projectiles. Musashi can also enter a "guard" stance, which blocks attacks from all directions. Striking and parrying will deplete an opponent's stamina, allowing players to use "Break Issen", a move which instantly executes an enemy by dismembering them. Performing consecutive parries or dodges grants Musashi combat buffs, enabling him to swiftly execute enemies in succession or unleash a multi-hit attack, respectively. He can also use the environment to his advantage, such as flipping a table and using it as a temporary shield. One of the biggest change is that there are no alternative weapons in the game, and the game is solely focused on swordplay

Throughout the game, Musashi is equipped with a sentient gauntlet that consumes the souls of defeated enemies. The game has three types of "souls". Yellow souls replenish the player's health, red souls can be used to buy upgrades, and blue souls allows players to use "Oni Armaments", which are special weapons that deal large damage to enemies. Hitting enemies with Oni Armaments in turn provide players with yellow souls. Using Break Issen on boss characters does not execute them instantly, though it grants players a choice to deal massive amount of damage or gain more souls. With the gauntlet, Musashi can also activate "Oni Vision", which enables him to identify the location of all demons and enemies in an area. Way of the Sword is a largely linear game, though it also has open a main hub area that slowly opens up as players progress, and contains side quests.

== Plot ==
In feudal Japan 1604, wandering samurai Miyamoto Musashi duels master swordsman Yoshioka Seijuro. Musashi prevails by crippling Yoshioka's arm and is forced to flee from his vengeful students, though in the confusion Yoshioka is killed by an unknown force. Escaping the students, Musashi meets one of his rivals, Sasaki Ganryu. They both prepare to duel, but are ambushed and killed by supernatural creatures called Genma. Musashi awakens in the depths of Hell, where a Man in White forcibly attaches an Oni Gauntlet to his arm and sends him back to the mortal realm. With the power of the gauntlet, Musashi defeats the Genma but is disheartened to learn from a voice within the gauntlet that if he tries to remove it, he will die. The gauntlet then instructs Musashi to search for a man named Ono no Takamura.

Musashi tracks down Takamura and his apprentice Izumo no Okuni at a nearby temple, where he finds Takamura also wields an Oni Gauntlet. Takamura explains that he is an "Onimusha", a warrior chosen by the Oni to protect the gate to Hell and prevent any Genma from escaping. He then tasks Musashi with eliminating Genma and the Rifts they invade from, so he can absorb their souls into the gauntlet to power it up. As Musashi eliminates the Genma and purifies sanctuaries, he encounters Ganryu, who was also revived by an Oni Gauntlet gifted by the Man in White. Ganryu becomes obsessed with the power of the gauntlet, and begins slaughtering humans to absorb their souls. Eventually, Musashi is able to awaken the Oni soul residing inside his gauntlet, Shizuka Gozen. Shizuka explains that the Oni were wiped out by an army of Genma led by Minamoto no Yoshitsune, who is the Man in White's true identity. With the Oni gone, only the Onimusha can stop Yoshitsune from breaching Hell and invading the mortal realm.

After eliminating more Genma, Musashi encounters Dokyo, a mysterious woman that is assisting Yoshitsune. It is also revealed that Shizuka and Yoshitsune were married, and Shizuka admits that the Oni once recruited Yoshitsune as an Onimusha, but were forced to imprison him in Hell when his thirst for power grew too great. Musashi later comes across Ganyru again, who has started massacring humans for their souls and is assisted by Gioh, the Oni spirit inhabiting his gauntlet. Musashi does battle against him but is defeated, with Ganryu sparing his life out of pity. Despondent at the humiliating defeat, Musashi briefly considers absorbing human souls as well to match Ganryu's power, but eventually decides against it. When he battles the Oni traitor Shuten Douji, his desire to trust in Shizuka and his friends allows him to channel the power of the Oni, briefly transforming into one and killing Shuten Douji. However, Takamura senses that Arashiyama, a key sanctuary, is under threat from the Genma. Musashi and Shizuka discover that Dokyo has recruited Ganryu in her plans to corrupt the sanctuary and defeat the both of them. Ganryu's arm is cut off and he dies without his gauntlet while Dokyo is badly wounded and forced to retreat.

As Musashi is lured away to battle more Genma, Gioh ambushes and kills Okuni to recover Ganryu's gauntlet and she sacrifices herself to revive him. Seeing Okuni dead, Takamura removes his own gauntlet and gives it to her to revive her, but Yoshitsune briefly possesses Okuni's body to fatally stab Takamura. Ganryu absorbs Takamura's soul and uses it to open the gate to Hell to confront Yoshitsune, but is swiftly killed by him. Taking all of the human souls Ganryu collected as well as Takamura's soul, Yoshitsune breaks open the Oni Gate and builds a massive palace on top of it. Musashi scales the palace and confronts Yoshitsune, who reveals Musashi and Ganryu acted according to his plans, collecting human and Genma souls for him. Once he combines human, Genma, and Oni souls together, he will become a godlike being who can rewrite reality itself. Musashi battles Yoshitsune and is able to defeat him. Mortally wounded, Yoshitsune's soul ceases to exist due to having removed himself from the natural cycle of rebirth. Shizuka thanks Musashi for his assistance and returns to Hell restore order there. Musashi then notices Dokyo proclaiming that even with Yoshitsune defeated, her own plan has reached fruition, and she escapes with a revived Ganryu. Musashi then absorbs all of the Oni souls Yoshitsune had been holding, which heals his body, and allows the gauntlet to fall of on its own for the first time.

Afterwards, Musashi and Okuni decide to part ways, with Musashi deciding to track down Ganryu and Dokyo while Okuni swears to carry on Takamura's duties as an Onimusha while spreading the art of kabuki dance.

However, in the post-credits scene, Musashi has placed the gauntlet back on his arm, accepting his role as an Onimusha. He encounters Okuni fighting Genma and they begin traveling together, with Musashi teaching Okuni how to be a master swordsman.

== Development ==
The game was developed by Capcom. It was part of Capcom's efforts to revive some of its dormant franchises. According to producer Akihito Kadowaki, members of Capcom had always wanted to continue the Onimusha franchise, though the publisher was unable to allocate resources for it. The game was greenlit in early 2020, when RE Engine, Capcom's proprietary engine, had its utilities and functions massively expanded. The game was designed to be accessible while remaining challenging for experienced players, with director Satoru Nihei adding that it was not a Soulslike and their main focus was to modernize the series and "express the clashing of blades through the action". In contrast with the previous games, combat was designed to be more deliberate, requiring players to observe their opponent's moves and decide the timing of each strike. The team invited real-life swordsmen to their motion capture studio to ensure combat in the game was grounded in reality.

The narrative of Way of the Sword was not related to the previous games or the Netflix animated series, as Capcom wanted players new to the franchise to understand the game's story with ease. Like previous games in the series, however, Genma remained as the main antagonist. Capcom considered Mifune to be "the quintessential samurai action actor", and it took two years of discussions and negotiations with Mifune Productions to secure the license to use his likeness in the game. The game was designed to be "cinematic", with Capcom investing significantly into the game's motion capture technology and animation process. The team consulted with temple officials, such as those from Kiyomizu-dera, to ensure that their depiction of feudal Japan was realistic. The game is expected to be around 20-hours long.

Way of the Sword was revealed at The Game Awards in December 2024, and was released for PlayStation 5, Windows, and Xbox Series X/S on September 4, 2026, moving up three weeks from its original release date of September 25. The Nintendo Switch 2 version was later revealed during the Nintendo Direct in June 2026.

== Reception ==
Reception

Aggregate scores
Aggregator	Score
Metacritic	(NS2) 90/100 (PC) 83/100 (PS5) 85/100 (XSXS) 83/100
OpenCritic	93% recommend

Review scores
Publication	Score
Eurogamer	4/5
Game Informer	8/10
GameSpot	8/10
GamesRadar+	3.5/5
Giant Bomb	4/5
Hardcore Gamer	4.5/5
IGN	10/10
Nintendo Life	9/10
Nintendo World Report	9/10
PC Gamer (US)	83/100
PCGamesN	8/10
Push Square	9/10
RPGamer	4/5
Shacknews	9/10
Video Games Chronicle	3/5

Onimusha: Way of the Sword received "generally favorable" reviews and the Nintendo Switch 2 version received "universal acclaim", according to review aggregator Metacritic. On review aggregator OpenCritic, the game was recommended by 93% of critics.

The game sold over one million copies on its launch day.

=== Awards ===
Year	Award	Category	Result	Ref.
2026	Golden Joystick Awards	Best Audio Design	Won	
2026	Golden Joystick Awards	Console Game of the Year	Nominated	
2026	The Game Awards 2026	Best Action Game	Pending	
