= Yoshinori Ono =

Japanese game producer

- 小野義徳
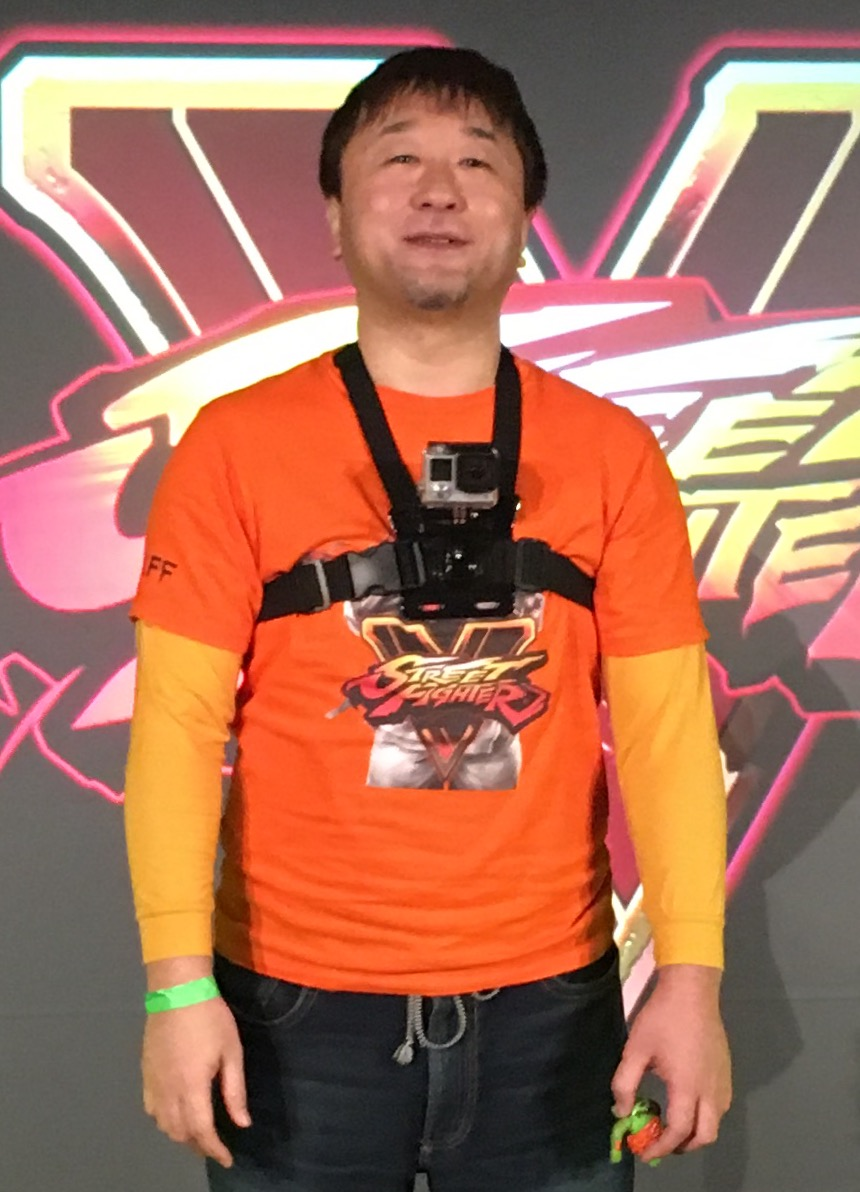
- Ono in 2016
- Born: August 10, 1971 (age 55); Osaka, Japan
- Occupation: Video game producer
- Years active: 1993–present
- Employers: Capcom (1993–2020); Delightworks (2021–2022); Lasengle (2022–present)
- Known for: Street Fighter series

Yoshinori Ono (小野義徳, Ono Yoshinori) is a Japanese video game producer and former sound producer and composer. He joined Capcom in 1993, where he acted as producer on the Street Fighter franchise up to Street Fighter V. He was the studio director of Capcom Vancouver, the developer of the Dead Rising series, from 2011 to 2014.

On August 9, 2020, Ono announced on his Twitter account that he left Capcom in summer 2020. On April 27, 2021, Ono announced his new position as president and chief operating officer of Delightworks, particularly its game division. Since Aniplex acquired Delightworks' game division as of December 12, 2021, Ono and other employees of the division moved to its successor under Aniplex's subsidiary company name, Lasengle as of early 2022.

== Games ==
Year	Title	Role(s)
1993	Saturday Night Slam Masters	Music producer
1995	Street Fighter Alpha	Sound programmer
1995	Street Fighter: The Movie	Music composer
1997	Mega Man: Battle & Chase	Music composer
1998	Street Fighter Alpha 3	Sound manager
1999	Street Fighter III 3rd Strike	Sound manager
2000	Breath of Fire IV	Opening FMV sound manager
2000	Spawn: In the Demon's Hand	Sound producer
2000	Dino Crisis 2	Publicist
2001	Devil May Cry	Sound design coordination
2001	Onimusha: Warlords	Sound manager
2001	Heavy Metal: Geomatrix	Sound producer
2001	Mobile Suit Gundam: Federation vs. Zeon	Sound manager
2002	Onimusha 2: Samurai's Destiny	Assistant producer
2003	Chaos Legion	Producer
2003	Resident Evil Outbreak	CG modeling
2004	Resident Evil Outbreak File 2	Character design director
2004	Capcom Fighting Evolution	Producer
2005	Shadow of Rome	Producer
2006	Onimusha: Dawn of Dreams	Producer
2007	Monster Hunter Frontier Z	Producer
2008	Street Fighter IV	Producer
2008	Tatsunoko vs. Capcom	General manager
2010	Super Street Fighter IV	Producer
2010	Super Street Fighter IV: Arcade Edition	Producer
2012	Street Fighter X Tekken	Producer
2014	Ultra Street Fighter IV	Executive producer
2016	Street Fighter V	Executive producer
2017	Ultra Street Fighter II: The Final Challengers	Producer
2017	Marvel vs. Capcom: Infinite	Executive producer
2021	Melty Blood: Type Lumina	COO and president of Delightworks
2022	Witch on the Holy Night	Executive producer

== Filmography ==
- Street Fighter: Assassin's Fist (2014) - Ono
