= Shadow of Rome =

2005 video game

- European cover art
- Developer: Capcom
- Publisher: Capcom
- Director: Motohide Eshiro
- Producers: Keiji Inafune; Yoshinori Ono
- Programmer: Tsuyoshi Misawa
- Writers: Hiroshi Yamashita; Motohide Eshiro
- Composers: Yoshino Aoki; Kota Suzuki
- Platform: PlayStation 2
- Release: EU: February 4, 2005; NA: February 8, 2005; AU: February 11, 2005; JP: March 10, 2005
- Genres: Action-adventure, stealth
- Mode: Single-player

Shadow of Rome (Note: Japanese: シャドウオブローマ, Hepburn: Shadō obu Rōma) is a 2005 action-adventure video game with stealth elements for the PlayStation 2. Developed and published by Capcom, it was released in Europe, North America, and Australasia in February, and in Japan in March.

The plot is a fictional version of the assassination of Julius Caesar, focusing on two characters; Agrippa, a soldier whose father is accused of murdering Caesar, and who is forced to fight in the gladiatorial arenas, and Octavianus, who sets about proving Agrippa's father's innocence.

The game received mostly positive reviews with critics praising the gladiatorial combat mechanics, the over-the-top violence, and the graphics. Many critics, however, were unimpressed with the stealth sections of the game, particularly criticising the slow pace of these sections and the poor enemy AI. Originally conceived as the first part of a new franchise specifically aimed at a Western audience, the sequel was already in the early stages of development when the first game was released. However, due to poor sales, executive producer Keiji Inafune decided to scrap the franchise, and Shadow of Rome 2 ultimately became Dead Rising.

== Gameplay ==
Shadow of Rome is an action-adventure game played from a third-person perspective. The game features two forms of combat; close-quarters fighting with melee weapons and vehicular combat in the form of chariot racing. Stealth is also an important mechanic in certain parts of the game.

During combat, the player character is Agrippa, who can use various gladiatorial weapons such as swords, scimitars, maces, spears, halberds, bows, slingshots and flails. If Agrippa has severed the arm of an enemy, he can pick it up and also use it as a weapon. However, weapons can only be used for a certain amount of time before they break; during combat, a meter indicates the remaining vitality of Agrippa's weapon(s) and helmet (if he has one equipped).

Agrippa can attack with his main weapon, his sub-weapon or shield, or with a two-handed weapon. He can also throw weapons, and can fight with his fists, using strong and soft punches, shoulder tackles, and kicks. If timed correctly, Agrippa can also steal weapons from his enemies, or knock weapons out of their hands using a shoulder tackle. He can also attack from the ground by flinging sand into an approaching enemy's face, and he can attack downed enemies by stomping on them or stabbing them. If he stands behind a groggy enemy he can perform a suplex or grab the opponent and use them as a human shield.

Combat in Shadow of Rome. Agrippa has just cut both of his opponent's arms off, earning the "Disarmed" salvo. His salvo meter is on the bottom right of the screen.

An important aspect of the gameplay are "SALVOs"; specific actions or combinations of actions which excite the crowd. When Agrippa performs a salvo action, he is awarded with salvo points, which fill up the salvo meter. If he calls for the attention of the crowd when the meter is full, the audience will throw him rare and powerful weapons. If he calls for their attention when it is not full, they will throw normal weapons, shields, food, or often, nothing at all.

During chariot sections, Agrippa must race against other chariots and can win by either crossing the finish line first, killing all of his opponents, or disabling all opposing chariots. He can eliminate opponents by driving alongside their chariots and attacking them or by forcing their chariots into obstacles. Weapons with a longer reach can be found on the track itself, carried by slaves. Agrippa can whip his horses to give a speed boost, but doing so drains the horses' stamina gauge. When it is empty, the horses can only run at normal speed, until the gauge begins to fill up again.

The other component of the game is stealth. In these sections, the player controls Octavianus, who cannot kill enemies, he can only knock them out by hitting them from behind with objects such as vases, choking them with ropes, or placing banana peels in their path. Once he has done so, he often has to drag their body into hiding to ensure other enemies don't find it. He can also distract enemies by throwing items such as stones and by whistling.

An important part of avoiding detection is stealing the clothes of unconscious enemies and impersonating them; usually in the form of a guard, a senator, or a maid. Even if Octavianus is disguised, however, enemies can become suspicious if he does anything unusual, such as running, standing still for no reason, or trying to open locked doors. Often, enemies will stop him and question him, with the player presented with a series of dialog choices to try to assuage the guards' suspicions. If the player picks the wrong answer, Octavianus' disguise will fail, and he will be killed.

During levels where he must follow someone, Octavianus has a "Tail Gauge". When the person he is following is out of sight, the gauge starts to empty, and when it is fully depleted he is adjudged to have lost the person he was tailing and the game is over. There is also an alert gauge which appears when an enemy spots Octavianus. The gauge gradually empties over time if he is out of sight, and once it is empty, enemies will stop looking for him.

== Story ==
=== Background ===
By 49 BC, the Roman Republic had become the world's most dominant power, with its vast territory stretching across the Mediterranean. However, under the authority of the Senate, governmental corruption and endless wars had become the norm, with the citizens of Rome on the brink of despair. It was at this point that Julius Caesar openly defied the Senate's authority and marched towards Rome at the head of an army, ultimately acquiring unlimited power and influence. Although the Senate hated and feared Caesar, the citizens embraced their new leader as he vowed to usher in an era of peace and prosperity.

=== Plot ===
The game begins on March 15, 44 BC, as Caesar is murdered on his way to a Senate meeting. As he dies, he looks at his assailant and says, "Et tu, Brute?"

At Caesar's cremation, the senator Cicero reveals the assassin; a soldier named Vipsanius. As Vipsanius pleads his innocence, Cicero announces Caesar's successor as decreed in his will; Antonius. Listening from the crowd, however, Octavianus, Caesar's nephew, refuses to believe Vipsanius is guilty. Meanwhile, Vipsanius's son, a centurion named Agrippa, receives word of Caesar's death and the accusation against his father and orders a return to Rome.

Soon after the cremation, Octavianus sneaks into the Senate, where he finds a letter from Vipsanius warning Caesar there are rumors an attempt may be made on his life. On the Senate floor, Maecenas, Antonius's scriba, proposes a gladiatorial tournament, the winner of which will perform Vipsanius's execution. Antonius approves and agrees to have Vipsania, Vipsanius's wife, publicly executed the following day.

The execution is presided over by Decius Brutus. Before it can take place, Agrippa arrives, but he cannot save his mother, and is then beaten in combat by Decius. Before Agrippa can be arrested, however, he and Octavianus are saved by a woman on a chariot. She reveals her name is Claudia, a female gladiator. After an aborted attempt to break Vipsanius out of prison, Claudia tells them about the gladiatorial tournament, and that her brother, Sextus runs a gladiator camp, which Agrippa could join to gain entry to the tournament and possibly save his father. Meanwhile, Octavianus will return to Rome and investigate the murder.

Although repulsed by the violence and bloodlust, Agrippa begins fighting his way through the tournament. Meanwhile, Octavianus begins following Cicero's protégé, Marcus Brutus in the hopes that he may be the "Brute" of whom Caesar spoke. He overhears a heated conversation between Marcus and Cassius in which Cassius warns that the truth is going to come out soon and urges Marcus to "take responsibility." Soon thereafter he finds Cassius's body, stabbed. Hearing footsteps, he hides and observes Maecenas order the guards to secretly dispose of the body. Meanwhile, Sextus is visited by Iris and Charmian who come with "a direct order from our mistress." They want Sextus to assassinate someone, in return for which their mistress will aid his plans. He agrees.

Back in Rome, Octavianus finds Cicero stabbed in the senate. The dying Cicero tells him a group of conspirators are responsible for Caesar's assassination, and Vipsanius is innocent. Marcus is a member of the group, but the actual murderer is "another Brutus." In the gladiator camp, Claudia tells Agrippa that Sextus is the son of Pompeius, who was killed in battle by Caesar and she explains that he plans to assassinate Octavianus (Caesar's only surviving blood relative) to gain support for his conquest of Rome. Meanwhile, Octavianus locates a note in Caesar's handwriting that reveals Antonius was not his chosen heir. Octavianus then witnesses Decius stabbing Marcus. A dying Marcus tells Octavianus that he is Caesar's illegitimate son and that Decius is the "other Brutus."

Meanwhile, Agrippa fights his way to the tournament final, where he faces Decius. He wins and Maecenas arrives in the arena, explaining that Antonius was the mastermind behind the assassination; borne from his discovery that he was not Caesar's heir. Maecenas then reveals Caesar's true chosen heir - Octavianus. A furious Antonius orders Decius to kill Octavianus, but Agrippa intervenes and kills Decius. As Agrippa and Vipsanius are reunited, Antonius is arrested. However, Sextus attacks Rome and Antonius escapes. Agrippa and Claudia go to confront Sextus, with Agrippa begging him to surrender, but when Antonius attacks the docks, Sextus sacrifices himself to save Claudia. As a battle rages at sea, Agrippa tracks down and kills Antonius.

Back in Rome, Agrippa, Octavianus, and Claudia mourn Sextus. She tells them she is leaving Rome, but will keep an eye on things. Octavianus then vows to fulfil Caesar's dream of the Pax Romana, with Agrippa vowing to help him in any way he can. In the epilogue, Iris and Charmian state it is time to tell their mistress they have "reached the end of the beginning."

== Development ==
Shadow of Rome was first revealed in January 2004. Using an enhanced version of the Onimusha 3 game engine, and developed by the same team at Capcom, under the guidance of executive producer Keiji Inafune, the game was announced as a PlayStation 2 exclusive. Speaking of the engine, producer Yoshinori Ono said,

the graphics engine for Onimusha 3 pushed the PS2 hardware to its limits. So for Shadow of Rome, we challenged ourselves to maintain as much of the Onimusha 3 quality, while injecting the dynamics of Shadow of Rome's action battle and stealth portions where the user can move the camera around at will. Our CG designers really know the engine inside and out. So we took this engine that pushes the PS2 hardware to its limits and planned a completely different game around it."

In his first look at the game, GameSpot's Ricardo Torres wrote,

the robust and ambitious graphics engine pumps out an impressive number of polygons that are complemented by clean textures, lighting effects, and a number of visual filters and particle effects that certainly help bring the world to life. You'll see everything from striking lighting effects used to highlight dawn or dusk, to clouds of dust kicked up during chariot races or catapult battles. The powerful and fully 3D engine creates a rich world to explore that offers plenty to appreciate.

Initially, the game featured a semi-branching storyline, whereby if the player excelled at stealth sections, there would be more levels based around stealth, whereas if they were better at combat, more combat levels would feature. Another planned game mechanic that was dropped from the final build was Octavianus having the ability to combine items into makeshift weapons during the stealth sections.

A playable demo of the game was made available at E3 in May, showcasing one Agrippa level and one Octavianus level. Capcom explained the game was specifically designed for North American and European markets, and although release dates for both markets had been set, they were unsure if the game would get a release in Japan as it was not tailored for the Japanese market. In an interview with GameSpot, Inafune said, "I think personally, that the period of making games only for Japan, only for our market, and then sending them over to America and just selling them as an afterthought, I think that time period is now ended. Now, game developers really have to start making games that cater more to the Western audience. Shadow of Rome is our first attempt at that."

== Reception ==
Reception

Aggregate score
Aggregator	Score
Metacritic	75/100

Review scores
Publication	Score
Electronic Gaming Monthly	7.2/10
Eurogamer	6/10
Famitsu	33/40
Game Informer	8.5/10
GameSpot	8.2/10
GameSpy	3.5/5
IGN	7.6/10
Official U.S. PlayStation Magazine	4/5

Shadow of Rome received "generally favorable reviews", holding an aggregate score of 75 out of 100 on Metacritic, based on fifty-two reviews.

Game Informer's Lisa Mason scored the game 8.5 out of 10. She praised the depth of the combat mechanics and the implementation of the SALVO system, pointing out "simply beating enemies isn't the hardest part of a bout, appeasing the crowd and fueling their bloodlust is." However, she was disappointed with the stealth sections, arguing, "they lack finesse." She was especially critical of the slow pace of these sections. GameSpot's Greg Kasavin scored it 8.2 out of 10, praising the storyline and cutscenes, and lauding the combination of action and stealth, saying, "there's nothing hugely original about Shadow of Rome, but its combination of different elements is definitely unique." Although he found the pace of the stealth sections too slow, he concluded "Shadow of Rome offers some of the best hack and slash combat out there."

Thierry Nguyen of Official U.S. PlayStation Magazine scored it 4 out of 5. He was particularly impressed with the bosses and lauded the combat, but he was critical of the stealth sections, arguing "they just slow the game down to a crawl." He concluded, "it's sad that some of the best pure action on the PS2 is paired with such amateurish stealth." IGN's Ed Lewis scored it 7.6 out of 10, praising the combat. Although he didn't dislike the stealth sections, he felt "neither side of the game [...] is complex enough or [has] enough detail to make them something to want to dig into."

Electronic Gaming Monthly scored it 7.2 out of 10. Mark MacDonald praised the combat and the plot but was critical of the dialog and the stealth sections, especially the AI. Crispin Boyer praised the brutality of the combat but found some of the objectives frustrating. Thierry Nguyen also praised the combat mechanics but was critical of the stealth sections, especially their slow pace. GameSpy's Bryn Williams scored it 3.5 out of 5, writing it "oozes potential but ultimately fails to deliver greatness." He called the stealth levels "distinctly bland, and above all else, poorly designed." He was also critical of the voice acting and the cutscenes. He concluded, "the overall theme and premise of Shadow of Rome ends up coming across as a missed opportunity for gaming greatness."

Eurogamer's Kristan Reed scored it 6 out of 10, calling it "one of those frustrating 'nearly' games that could and should have been brilliant." He praised the concept of mixing two gameplay styles, but felt the stealth sections were underdeveloped, arguing "they're just never that enjoyable on a basic level," and calling them "tedious, exacting, basic, and inconsistent." However, he was also critical of the action sections, calling them "blister inducing," and arguing "the same tactics get you through every time." He ultimately concluded, "there's something oddly soulless about [the game]."

== Cancelled sequels ==
Although originally conceived as the first part of a franchise aimed specifically at Western markets, Shadow of Rome did not sell well in either North America or Europe (entering the UK PlayStation 2 charts at #5), and ultimately, Capcom considered it a failure. Shadow of Rome 2 was already in early development prior to the release of the first game, but after the poor sales, executive producer Keiji Inafune chose to abandon the project, and Shadow of Rome 2 ultimately became Dead Rising.
