= Onimusha 3: Demon Siege =

2004 video game

- North American PlayStation 2 box art
- Developer: Capcom: Microsoft Windows Sourcenext
- Publishers: Capcom: PlayStation 2 Capcom Microsoft Windows; JP: Sourcenext; EU/NA: Ubisoft; Steam: Capcom
- Director: Minoru Nakai
- Producer: Keiji Inafune
- Programmers: Shingo Ohi; Yasuhiro Anpo
- Writers: Noboru Sugimura; Shin Yoshida; Hiroaki Kanazawa; Minoru Nakai
- Composers: Masamichi Amano; Akari Kaida; Hideki Okugawa; Kota Suzuki
- Series: Onimusha
- Platforms: PlayStation 2 Windows
- Release: PlayStation 2: JP: February 26, 2004; NA: April 27, 2004; PAL: July 9, 2004; Windows: JP: November 25, 2005; EU: February 24, 2006; NA: March 16, 2006; WW: August 22, 2007 (Steam)
- Genres: Action-adventure, hack and slash
- Mode: Single-player

Onimusha 3: Demon Siege, released in Japan and Europe as Onimusha 3 (鬼武者3, Onimusha Surī), is a 2004 action-adventure game developed and published by Capcom. It is the third game of the Onimusha series and was released for the PlayStation 2 in April 2004, and later ported to Windows in December 2005. The story focuses on the returning hero, swordsman Hidemitsu Samanosuke Akechi, who is in his quest to defeat Nobunaga Oda, who wishes to conquer Japan with his army of demons known as Genma. Samanosuke, however, changes places with a French officer from the future named Jacques Blanc, and both have to adapt to their new worlds to get rid of Genma army and stop Oda Nobunaga's ambitions to conquer the world.

The game retains elements from previous games in the franchise including the use of multiple special weapons in order to fight enemies and absorb their energy to enhance the weaponry. This time the player primarily controls both Samanosuke and Jacques in separate scenarios. The two are able to exchange items in order to solve puzzles. In order to appeal to the Western market, the team set this game in Paris and chose French actor Jean Reno to portray Jacques.

Onimusha 3 has been generally well received by video game publications. Most of the writers' praise focused on the improved controls and the use of a 3D engine that allowed better combat and visuals. Critics also highly praised the CGI intro cutscene, which had martial arts legend Donnie Yen directing the fight sequences.

One of the main criticisms was the game's very short length. The game also generated good sales, with over 1.5 million copies sold as of May 2008, although according to Capcom it did not sell as much as they had hoped for.

== Gameplay ==
Onimusha 3 is played in a real-time environment instead of pre-rendered backgrounds, although the camera is still controlled by the computer. Gameplay alternates between Samanosuke fighting in modern-day Paris and Jacques fighting in feudal Japan. Samanosuke fights using close range weapons, while Jacques uses an energy whip, which can also be used at certain points to swing across gaps. While Samanosuke cannot swing like Jacques he is able to use a bow in order to perform long-range attacks. Both characters also have defensive skills known as Issen that allows them to instantly kill an enemy by attacking just before the enemy makes contact with its attack.

Samanosuke and Jacques can gain elemental weapons, changing their fighting style and allowing access to magical attacks. Defeating enemies reaps souls, which when absorbed can restore health and magic, be used as currency for purchasing ammunition and health items, and allow Samanosuke or Jacques to enter a more powerful Onimusha state for a short time. If the player collects certain items during the game and completes it, Samanosuke will be able to use his weapons from the first game in the next playthrough. Armors with different properties can be obtained in the game but they require some items in order to work.

During certain portions of the story, players also get to control Michelle, who relies on firearms. Another minigame gives the players control over the lance fighter Heihachiro. Unlike Samanosuke and Jacques, Heihachiro and Michelle do not possess upgradeable weapons and cannot enter the Oni mode.

New to this game is a focus on time travel when solving puzzles. For example, if Samanosuke comes across a door in the present that has become too withered to open, Jacques will need to open the door in the past so that it will stay open for Samanosuke to progress. Things Samanosuke does in the present will not affect things in the past, but Ako is able to transfer some items between both timelines.

== Plot ==
Having returned from mastering his newfound abilities as an Onimusha, Samanosuke Akechi returns to battle the Genma army in Japan 1582 as he fights his way to Honnō-ji Temple to finally put an end to Nobunaga Oda. Although Nobunaga was defeated by Jubei Yagyu years earlier, due to the fact that Jubei did not possess an Oni Gauntlet to seal Nobunaga away, this allowed the Genma to revive him. Though Samanosuke defeats Nobunaga's ward Mori Ranmaru, he is defeated by Nobunaga. Before the Genma Lord can kill him, he ends up being pulled through a portal that opened below him. Samanosuke awakens in Paris in the year 2004 where he aids a man named Jacques Blanc in fighting the Genma army that has begun its invasion near the Arc de Triomphe. The time portal reappears and teleports Jacques to feudal Japan.

Samanosuke then meets Michelle, Jacques' girlfriend, near the Arc and makes his way towards the roof. Across his fights, Samanosuke briefly meets an old enemy: The Genma scientist Guildenstern. Guildenstern recovered a device from Oni ruins that, through experimentation, generated a "time warp" that brought him and a number of Genma soldiers into the future. By establishing a base in Mont-Saint-Michel, he has built a new time warp generator to bring a large Genma army through time and conquer the future.

Jacques arrives in 16th century Japan, 10 days before the siege on Honnō-ji Temple and encounters a different Samanosuke. He is also met by an Oni spirit that grants him a gauntlet with Oni powers and entrusts him with a spirit named Ako in order to assist him in his quest. Samanosuke and Jacques must stop the Genma invasion in both the present and the past in order to return to their own time periods and undo the damage to the timeline. In 2004 Paris, future Samanosuke teams up with Michelle and Jacques' son Henri to save the city from destruction, while in feudal Japan, Jacques and the past's Samanosuke struggle to fight Nobunaga's forces. Across his journey, Jacques and the past's Samanosuke meet Tadakatsu Heihachirō Honda who is linked with the Oda clan. Heihachirō decides to join Samanosuke and Jacques' cause. The future Samanosuke also encounters the time displaced Ranmaru who has been infused with Genma blood and is progressively transforming into a Genma warrior.

Following several battles, future Samanosuke manages to defeat the Genma forces in 2004 by defeating Guildenstern and Genma Ranmaru. Meanwhile, in feudal Japan, Heihachirō is killed by the past's Ranmaru and Jacques avenges him when reaching Honnō-ji Temple. Jacques defeats Nobunaga and returns to his time, where Genma Ranmaru kills Henri. Jacques, after killing Ranmaru a second time, holds Henri's body and his Oni gauntlet transforms into an energy that enters Henri and revives him from death.

Back in feudal Japan, Nobunaga recovers and kills the past Samanosuke, but future Samanosuke returns to his time and absorbs his alternate self to assume his Onimusha form. Following a battle in the Genma Netherworld, Samanosuke defeats Nobunaga's Genma form before sealing the warlord's soul in the Oni Gauntlet. Samanosuke then starts a journey with Ako to seal his Gauntlet to ensure Nobunaga can never return. In an alternate ending, Ako takes on a human child-like form to accompany Samanosuke.

In post credit scene, it is revealed that Nobunaga's death is permanent, but it also enables his former vassal Tokichiro to begin his own conquest of Japan as Toyotomi Hideyoshi, leading to the finale of the story in Onimusha: Dawn of Dreams.

== Development ==
Onimusha 3: Demon Siege was announced in May 2003 as the last game within the franchise. The Onimusha series was originally conceived as a trilogy with Onimusha 3 meant to close the storyline. The team behind Onimusha 3 had previously developed the first game, Onimusha: Warlords. The two share in common the focus in action as Onimusha 2: Samurai's Destiny was made by another team that implemented a bigger focus in adventure.

As Onimusha 2: Samurai's Destiny did not sell well in the Western market, Capcom decided to make the next sequel with the idea of appealing Western gamers. Capcom employee Ben Judd was skeptical whether this approach would work. As a result, they decided to set in Paris in order to generate a big contrast with ancient Japan. New York was also suggested by members from the staff, but they found that city was used in many games. The city was also decided because Onimusha 2 had the worst sales in Europe making them focus on where they "lost the war". Capcom anticipated this game to sell 700,000 copies worldwide by the end of the fiscal year after its release. With the use of the modern French setting, the story involved time travel which worried producer Keiji Inafune as it could negatively affect the game if it was not well executed, but Infafune was pleased with the final product. The game's concept was "what would a Samurai do in the modern world, and what would a modern cop do in the ancient world".

In order to fit the game's setting, the staff chose the French actor Jean Reno as a model for the new character of Jacques. Additionally, in order to make sure the game was realistic, Reno worked with the Capcom staff to make Jacques' motion capture and French voice acting. Inafune compared Reno's role with Takeshi Kaneshiro's work in the first Onimusha game as both actors are famous. By adding Reno, the team managed to appeal to both Eastern and Western gamers. Kaneshiro also returned to voice and motion capture Samanosuke. CG director Takashi Yamazaki and action director Donnie Yen were invited to help in the making of the game's movie scenes which "helped immensely" thanks to their experience. Over a hundred staff members worked together in the game's opening scene which took two years to complete.

As the first two Onimusha games were designed with the original PlayStation in mind, they were given 2D backgrounds. In contrast, Onimusha 3 started development after the PlayStation 2 was released, and the team managed to develop 3D backgrounds thanks to a new engine. Although the team faced the challenge of making the 3D backgrounds as interesting as the prerendered backgrounds, working some of the time on the PlayStation 2 gave the team confidence in designing the game. The Japanese version of the game was made less challenging than the American and European versions based on the wide audience Capcom was appealing to in Japan.

For the Japanese launch of Onimusha 3, peripheral manufacturer Hori released a special Onimusha-themed memory card and the "Soul Controller", a 38-inch-long DualShock controller shaped like a tachi sword. Swinging the device around causes the player character within the game to do the same. Onimusha 3 was collected alongside its two predecessors and a strategy guide in Japan as part of a box set released by Capcom on December 22, 2004.

Sourcenext ported Onimusha 3 to PC for a Japanese release on December 8, 2005. The PC version was subsequently published by Ubisoft for distribution on European retailers on February 24 and North American retailers on March 16, 2006. It was also published by Capcom on Valve's Steam software on August 22, 2007. The game was also released with its two predecessors into the Onimusha Essentials compilation for North America in 2008.

== Pachislot ==
A pachislot machine based on Onimusha 3 was distributed to parlors in Japan in January 2005. This machine was adapted into a PlayStation 2 video game titled Jissen Pachi-Slot Hisshouhou! Onimusha 3, released on July 14 the same year, published by Sega.

== Reception ==
Reception

Aggregate scores
Aggregator	Score
GameRankings	PS2: 86% PC: 64%
Metacritic	PS2: 85/100; PC: 69/100

Review scores
Publication	Score
Computer and Video Games	PC: 6.6/10
Eurogamer	PS2: 8/10
GameSpot	PS2: 8.3/10; PC: 7.4/10
IGN	PS2: 9.0/10
PALGN	PS2: 8/10

Onimusha 3: Demon Siege debuted at number one on the Japanese sales charts according to Famitsu. The game managed to sell 431,000 units in its first week. The game went on to sell 569,275 units in Japan by the end of the year, making it the eleventh best-selling game in the region for 2004. Sales info from NPD Group and Chart Track show that Onimusha 3: Demon Siege was the 10th best-selling game in both the United States and the United Kingdom during the week of its release. The sales in North America regions were found "somewhat disappointing" with Capcom's Jun Takeuchi finding the staff's work was not enough to appeal to Western gamers. Capcom VP of Strategic Planning and Business Development Christian Svensson referred to Onimusha 3 and Onimusha: Dawn of Dreams as less successful games than the first two Onimusha titles. As of May 2008, Onimusha 3 sold 1.5 million copies worldwide.

The game achieved highly positive critical reception with both GameRankings and Metacritic rating it 85 out of 100. Critics commonly focused on the improved controls that allow players to use the joystick's left analogue in order to move rather than the D-pad improving the flow of the combat. Another common praise is the use of the 3D engine which gives the players a better view of the game's areas. On the other hand, Eurogamer criticized the lack of innovation to the franchise and the quality from the voice acting which resulted in inconsistency with Jacques' character. Jeremy Dunhan from IGN praised the story and the game's lasting appeal provided by its additional content. GameSpot's Greg Kasavin shared a similar view based on its "strong" but criticized some subplots such as Jacques' relationship with his family or Ako's role as one of the plot's biggest flaws. Although Eurogamer noted that there are times the camera does not show an enemy, the lock on function can remedy it by attacking enemies offscreen. The graphics also were well received by writers although Kasavin expected a bigger interaction with the areas. Dunhan found the game's audio appealing thanks its English cast but missed the original Japanese audio.

The PC port of the game received lower scores than the original PS2 game. Although Kasavin found the port to retain all the elements from the PS2 game, he still noted that it "looks and feels like an older PlayStation 2 game quickly ported to the PC". The Computer and Video Games staff acknowledged multiple issues such as low framerate and a lack of sound effects which resulted in the game being called a "halfarsed PC conversion".

=== Legacy ===
In the making of Resident Evil 4 game designer Shinji Mikami was inspired by Demon Siege. Mikami felt the game could have been better with a different camera angle from behind the player character, inspiring the over-the-shoulder camera of Resident Evil 4. According to Capcom's Yoshinori Ono, the 3D engine "pushed the PS2 hardware to its limits" resulting in Capcom's desire to retain the same quality for their following game, Shadow of Rome. Kenji Inafune commented that some gamers did not like the game because they did not think it was a proper samurai game. As a result, the next game, Onimusha: Dawn of Dreams, would be set in ancient Japan.

GamesRadar listed Jean Reno's work as one of the eight celebrity roles impossible to take seriously based on the actor's fame and previous works. On the other hand, GameSpot picked it as a finalist in the "Best Use of a Celebrity" award in its lists of 2004's best games. The magazine PSM3 made a feature titled "Onimusha 3: Why it was the pinnacle of PS2 action" where they praised the game for its depth in combat mechanics and how well it has aged despite retaining fixed cameras and a linear level progression. IGN also picked Onimusha 3 as "Game of the Month" in April 2004 as well as one of the best looking PlayStation 2 games. In the Japan Game Awards from 2003 and 2004, Onimusha 3 received the "Award for Excellence".
