= Onimusha: Dawn of Dreams =

2006 video game

- PAL region cover art
- Developer: Capcom Production Studio 2
- Publisher: Capcom
- Director: Koichi Kimura
- Producer: Yoshinori Ono
- Programmer: Osamu Ikeda
- Writer: Hiroshi Yamashita
- Composers: Hideyuki Fukasawa; Jamie Christopherson
- Series: Onimusha
- Platform: PlayStation 2
- Release: JP: January 26, 2006; NA: March 7, 2006; PAL: March 17, 2006
- Genres: Action role-playing, hack and slash
- Modes: Single-player, multiplayer

Onimusha: Dawn of Dreams, released in Japan as Shin Onimusha: Dawn of Dreams (新 鬼武者 Dawn of Dreams), is a 2006 action role-playing game developed and published by Capcom for the PlayStation 2. It is the sixth installment of Capcom's Onimusha series, and the fourth game in the canonical main series. It was released in Japan in January 2006, followed by North American and European releases in March. The plot is set in medieval Japan decades after the events of Onimusha 3: Demon Siege and focuses on Soki, a warrior who possesses Oni powers. Soki is on a quest to stop Hideyoshi Toyotomi, who has unified Japan in league with his demonic army of Genma after the death of Nobunaga by the hands of Samanosuke, and he also joins forces with several allies who all share the same goal in stopping the demons and Hideyoshi plans of wanting to conquer the world.

While the game retains the action elements from the previous Onimusha, it offers a more varied amount of different attacks, weapons, and the option of going back to previous stages to unlock new content (although there are points in the game where the players can no longer return to certain areas due to the plot moving to a different area of Japan). The game also introduces a 3D camera (although there are small areas that still retain the fixed camera of older Onimusha games) as well as the ability to continuously fight alongside AI-controlled characters who move depending on the player's orders (the player can switch between characters with a push of a button). Dawn of Dreams was announced by Capcom due to high fan demand and several Capcom members realizing they could expand the action elements from Onimusha after working on Shadow of Rome. The game was designed in order to appeal to skilled gamers rather than the general market which resulted in appealing designs rather than realistic.

Following its release, Onimusha: Dawn of Dreams received good critical response, but it generated poor sales. Writers praised the action, graphics, characters, and exploration elements but also criticized some elements from its presentation, including its dialogue, English voice acting, and some of the cutscenes being blurry and low resolution. Dawn of Dreams also received a film adaptation (consisting of in-game footage and cutscenes) and two manga spin-offs. This is also the first Onimusha where the main character is not based on an actor's likeness.

== Gameplay ==
The player controls Soki while giving orders to Jubei, with their respective lifebars displayed at the top.

Dawn of Dreams utilizes a complete 3D rendition of its environment rather than pre-rendered backdrops. In addition, the player is now able to control the camera for most of the game, as opposed to the static camera angles employed within its predecessors. The player primarily controls a swordsman named Soki who retains the abilities from previous Onimusha heroes such as magical skills and the ability to absorb the demons' souls upon defeating them. The demons' soul allow the player increase the power of his weapons and protection as well as restore the character's health and magic powers. Soki can also enter for a short time into the Oni mode which increases his powers, although this feature does not come into the game until halfway through.

When obtaining enough experience, Soki along with the other characters level up which gives the player the option of increasing any of their skills, as well as obtaining new moves as a result. Across his journey, Soki meets several allies who join him in combat, with each having different weapons and attacks. The player is responsible for handling their weaponry and level up. During gameplay, the second character that is not controlled by the player can be issued commands via the directional buttons. The player can also control the supporting character, allowing him to use the character's unique skills to perform an action Soki is unable to. For example, Jubei can take advantage of her low size to walk through weak floors or crawl through holes, Ohatsu can grapple and swing across areas as well as blow up certain objects with bombs, Roberto can push heavy objects or punch open locked metal doors, and Tenkai can interact with spirits and gain items of useful information from them. There is also the co-op mode that allows the second player to control another character, being a first for the series to add a two player mode.

Upon finishing a stage, the player rests in an area where they get the chance of going to a previous stage with a determined partner and unlock new items. Soki's teammates are able to combine the items Soki obtained in order to create medicine or equipment. Soki can also talk to the characters to learn more about them. Additionally, a shop system allows the player to purchase weapons that they can upgrade, along with valuable supplies such as medicine and accessories that convey a variety of benefits.

There is a Dark Realm that the player can freely choose to enter after a certain point in the game. If the active character is wearing one of the secret Street Fighter II costumes in the Dark Realm, the associated character's theme will play from the Panasonic 3DO port of Super Street Fighter II Turbo. Upon finishing the Dark Realm, the player can unlock a superweapon for the character.

== Plot ==
The game takes place fifteen years after the defeat of Nobunaga Oda at the end of Onimusha 3: Demon Siege. Nobunaga's former vassal, Tokichiro Kinoshita takes the name of Hideyoshi Toyotomi as he unites Japan and brings an end to the Sengoku Period, but the peace comes to an end when the "Omen Star" appears in the sky: several natural disasters occur as Hideyoshi sends his armies to attack the mainland Asia as the Genma resurface. Hideyoshi, like his master before him, uses the Genma to enforce his power while they gather "cherry trees" across Japan to Kyoto. Only Hideyoshi's illegitimate son, Yūki Hideyasu, refuses to follow his father and fights him under the name of Soki. With a bagworm creature named Minokichi as his sole companion, Soki spends two years attacking and burning transports carrying trees that the Genma are transporting, led by Danemon Ban among those Soki killed in battle. In the process, he becomes known as the "Blue Demon".

Soki eventually comes across Akane "Jubei" Yagyū, a young member from the Yagyu clan who inherited Oni powers from her grandfather, the same Jubei Yagyu who defeated Nobunaga many decades ago. Joining forces with Soki to infiltrate where the trees are being prepared for travel to Kyoto, Jubei is revealed to have been sent by her grandfather to assassinate their clan's traitor Munenori Yagyū. As Jubei fails to defeat Munenori, Soki encounters his childhood friend Ohatsu and attempts to convince her that Hideyoshi is evil by revealing the "cheery trees" to be Genma Trees: structures created from human bodies that produce Genma Insects which control whoever ingests them. Munenori incites Ohatsu to remain by his side as Soki is forced to run off to save Jubei. The two later come across a monk named Tenkai Nankobo who has been searching for the one who carries the power of the "Black Oni", the God of Darkness. Tenkai is also wearing an oni gauntlet. The group proceed to the castle of Hideyoshi's retainer Mitsunari Ishida, facing the lord's brainwashed warrior Sakon Shima as they save Roberto Frois, a Christian missionary from Spain who wants to take revenge on his guardian Luís Fróis for allying himself with the Genma. During their journey, Soki starts seeing a mysterious man in white.

When the group attempts to go after the Mother Genma Tree in Kyoto, Tenkai desperately tries to get the party focused on their mission but watches his party fall apart when Jubei and Roberto are each captured while going after their respective nemesis. Soki proceeds to runs off to face Hideyoshi alone. Ultimately, with Ohatsu siding with Soki, Tenkai seemingly sacrifices himself to save them while instructing Soki to go to a temple at Mt. Hiei. There, learning Ohatsu was infected with Genma Insects as they are now effecting her body, Soki meets a tengu girl named Arin who gives him a test, which enables him to become the "Onimusha", the Oni warrior capable of saving mankind, to save Ohatsu. Soki and Ohatsu manage to save Jubei and Roberto as they learn that Hideyoshi is only a puppet used by the Genma Triumvirate: Claudius who is symbiosis with Mitsunari, Rosencrantz who took over Fróis's body, and Ophelia. While Roberto destroys the Dark Stone powering Hideyoshi, Claudius reveals there is another stone and that his kind's goal is to resurrect their god once the Omen Star descends on the world.

Rejoined by Tenkai as they head to the other Dark Stone, Soki's group encounter Lady Yodo, Ohatsu's sister and Hideyoshi's royal concubine. To Ohatsu's dismay, she learns her sister is dead and that her corpse is inhabited by Ophelia herself. After defeating Ophelia, the group arrives to the Genma laboratory where they confront Claudius as he stops Roberto from attempting to destroy the remaining Dark Stone. A restored Sakon arrives at the last second to purge Claudius from Mitsunari's body, the Genma assuming his true form before being slain and causing an explosion that obliterates Rosencrantz with Fróis finally at peace. The group find themselves in a difficult situation as they have six days to reach Hideyoshi. During the escape Minokichi sacrifices himself to enable his friends to reach Kyoto.

Upon reaching Kyoto the group takes one final rest to mourn Minokichi as well as talk about their plan. Tenkai also takes this time to reminiscence about his past. They enter Kyoto for the final showdown, now consumed in Genma energies while they sally forth. Roberto, Tenkai, and Ohatsu remain behind to face the resurrected Genma Triumvirate while Jubei settles things with Munenori after he ingested enough Genma Insects to possess the power of both the Genma and his Oni heritage. Soki reaches Hideyoshi, who reveals to possess the Genma Seed that would allow him to become the vessel to the Genmas' god. Upon being defeated, however, a mortally wounded Hideyoshi is betrayed by Ophelia as she rips the Genma Seed out of him before she is destroyed by Lady Yodo, whose soul was sealed in the Mother Genma Tree as it attempts to consume everyone within its reach. Though the group saves Yodo and Soki makes peace with his dying father, the group finds that Munenori stole the Genma Seed during the commotion and resurrects the God of Light: the Genma Lord Fortinbras, who was previously resurrected by Nobunaga before being killed by Samanosuke decades earlier. Tenkai gives Soki his gauntlet, which contains the soul of another Genma Lord, to give Soki enough power to destroy Fortinbras before he is fully reborn. The attempt fails as Fortinbras, killing Munenori when he attempts to assassinate him for power, is revealed to be the mysterious man in white. Refusing to bow before the omnipotent foe despite the odds, Soki manages to kill Fortinbras after a hard-fought battle. Afterwards, sensing that it is his destiny Soki slowly ascends into the Omen Star before Jubei awakens and persuades him to stop. Soki passes through an invisible barrier and Jubei desperately tries to awake the others. As Soki gets near the top he turns to Jubei and tells her that if the blossoms come back again the following year, she will remember to think about him. Jubei cries out that she can't hear him and he disappears into the Omen Star, dying in the process.

The world then returns to peace, with the Cherry Blossoms returning. Soki's allies continue on with their lives: after some grieving time, Ohatsu ultimately decides to marry into another family while tending to her nephew and Yodo. Roberto returns to his homeland to ensure the Genma do not establish a place of power there. Tenkai departs with Arin to parts unknown (revealed that they are actually Samanosuke Akechi and the tengu Ako). Samanosuke has aged greatly but due to the Oni gauntlet he still maintains a younger look. Ako is also revealed within the game dialogue that she may be in love with Samanosuke and continues to care and follow him. As for Jubei, she never returned to Yagyu village. She is last seen visiting Soki's grave and thanks him for what he has done. She then goes on a journey to find meaning in life.

== Development ==
Although Onimusha 3: Demon Siege was announced as the last Onimusha game, Capcom's Keiji Inafune explained that it was actually the last title within Nobunaga Oda's storyline. Following the release of Demon Siege, Capcom got multiple requests by fans to develop another Onimusha game. Rather than making it a sequel titled Onimusha 4, the team thought about "resetting" the franchise as they planned to overhaul the gameplay. The game was officially unveiled in April 2005. The reveal included the game's premise and new main character. The cherry blossoms were defined by Inafune as the theme behind the game. Development of the game took two years. The making of the game was much different than the previous Onimusha games. At first there were few staff members, so they worked in the game design. Later, the team was expanded with artists and programmers. Following this, the team often reunited several times to discuss ideas to finalize the design of the game.

As a result of not being part of the same saga, Dawn of Dreams was given new gameplay elements. While Nobunaga's trilogy gave the player a clear goal and a fixed camera, Dawn of Dreams offers a free camera, meaning that players have the freedom to explore areas. To avoid having issues with the camera, the lock on function was made more clear while the joystick's right analogue allows to change enemy targets. The staff worked to keep the game at 60 frames per second while retaining the same graphical quality from previous games. In order to expand the exploration elements, players were given the possibility of going back to previous stages and obtain items thanks to items or abilities unlocked across the game. There was also the objective of giving the player far more options such as multiple weapons and strategies for non-controllable characters. When compared with the change the Resident Evil series had with its fourth installment, Inafune viewed the changes as smaller since Onimusha has always been focused on action unlike Resident Evil which changed from survival horror to action since its fourth title. He also mentioned the fighting system would be more intense than in previous games. When developing Shadow of Rome, producer Yoshinori Ono and Inafune realized they could innovate Onimusha by giving it more action elements. As Ono did not like some of the puzzles from previous games, he decided to make them optional for the player. Breaking puzzles rewards the player with certain items.

While previous games offered a mix of realism and fantasy, Dawn of Dreams had the concept of "cool". This affected the main character who was designed with the idea of making him look cool. Soki was not modelled after any famous Japanese star, unlike previous heroes. This is due to Capcom only trying to appeal hardcore games rather than the team's original goal of expanding the games to the general market. This resulted in more complex game mechanics. Additionally, the use of actors gave Capcom restriction when making projects involving the franchise outside of video games. Inafune expected Dawn of Dreams to be adapted to other forms of media. In order to add returning characters despite not being able to live in Dawn of Dreams's storyline, the staff used aliases. This generated early speculations, most notably the Tenkai's true identity being Samanosuke Akechi, the returning hero from previous games. Ono did not respond to the fans' questions, expecting them to learn the truth by playing it. Despite the focus on action rather than the setting, the team did not reduce the plot's length and instead they gave it twice the content of storyline than Demon Siege. Ono considered Demon Siege "quite short" and thus expected players to complete this game in between 30 and 40 hours.

== Music ==
The game's music is composed by Hideyuki Fukasawa and Jamie Christopherson. Fukasawa, who first came onto the video gaming music scene with his work on Chaos Legion, was responsible for most of Shin Onimusha's in-game music and soundtrack, while Christopherson was in charge of the game's cutscene orchestral scores. "Startin'" and "Rainy Day" by Japanese entertainer Ayumi Hamasaki are featured as the opening and ending themes for the game respectively. "Startin'" was composed by Kazuhiro Hara and arranged by CMJK; "Rainy Day" was composed by Roberto "Geo" Rosan of Sweetbox and arranged by Yuta Nakano. Hamasaki wrote the lyrics for both songs.

== Other media ==
Two manga tie-ins have been published by Udon Entertainment, filling in some of the background information behind the game:

- Onimusha: Twilight of Desire, by Takashi Yaguchi, talks about the battle between Tenkai and the nephew of Toyotomi Hideyoshi, Toyotomi Hidetsugu, who was at the time utilizing Genma Power introduced by Ophelia. This story takes place before the game and is also part of the reason why Hideyoshi came to utilize the Genma Power.
- Onimusha: Night of Genesis Volumes 1 & 2, by Mitsuru Ohsaki, explains some of the story between Soki and Hideyoshi, Soki's subsequent quest to destroy the Genma trees, and the machinations of Soki's birth family, the Tokugawa. It also details Jubei's inheritance of her grandfather's name and the awakening of her Demon Eye, as well as her start of her quest to hunt down Munenori.

A film adaptation, which compiles all the CG cutscenes from the game with newly animated ones to tell the story from Akane's perspective, was released on DVD in Japan on July 26, 2006, by Avex Trax. The film was licensed in North America by Media Blasters.

In 2010, a commercial for a pachislo version was released. Sōki has also appeared as a playable character in the 2008 fighting game, Tatsunoko vs. Capcom, with his allies appearing in his arcade ending as NPC's.

== Reception ==
Reception

Aggregate score
Aggregator	Score
Metacritic	81/100

Review scores
Publication	Score
GameRevolution	B+
GameSpot	8.0/10
IGN	8.8/10
VideoGamer.com	8/10

Dawn of Dreams underperformed upon release according to Capcom. It was the 41st bestselling game in Japan in 2006 with a total of 325,872 units shipped. Capcom VP of Strategic Planning and Business Development Christian Svensson referred to Demon Siege and Dawn of Dreams as less successful games than the first two Onimusha titles. In 2012, GamesRadar listed Dawn of Dreams as one of the titles they wished to be re-released in a HD collection since they noted the original game did not achieve good popularity as result of the next generation consoles having been released in the same period.

Despite its poor popularity, Dawn of Dreams received positive critical response by video game publications. It has had aggregate score of 81/100 on Metacritic. Praise was aimed commonly at its new action elements that give player a more varied combat. IGN commented that the enemies in the game are not so "smart" and that some puzzles can be "tedious", but praised the combat and challenge as "fantastic". The uniqueness of the controllable characters were noted for giving the player the idea of returning to previous stages and unlock new items. Although the new two player mode has been welcomed by critics, GameRevolution noted some issues within it that made it less appealing.

While GameSpot praised the quality of the voice acting, VideoGamer.com criticized it and was disappointed with how the European release of the title lacked the original Japanese audio unlike the North American release. The presentation received general positive response due to its graphics and cutscenes. Some critics noted some translation issues that affected the script. Nevertheless, the plot generated good responses by VideoGamer.com, who noted that while at first it could be difficult to understand to newcomers, the plot became more interesting as it moved on.

During 2007, Keiji Inafune commented that as Dawn of Dreams lacked characters based on real actors he felt there was entertainment value missing. As a result, he commented that should he ever make another Onimusha game he would add more of these characters. Inafune also talked about making a follow-up to Dawn of Dreams but he was more interested in developing Mega Man Legends 3, a game that never got realized.
