= Onimusha 2: Samurai's Destiny =

2002 video game

- North American box art
- Developer: Capcom Production Studio 2
- Publisher: Capcom
- Director: Motohide Eshiro
- Producer: Keiji Inafune
- Designer: Hayato Tsuru
- Programmer: Masaru Ijuin
- Artist: Keita Amemiya
- Writers: Noboru Sugimura; Hirohisa Soda; Shin Yoshida; Kishiko Miyagi
- Composers: Taro Iwashiro; Hideki Okugawa; Toshihiko Horiyama
- Series: Onimusha
- Engine: RE Engine (Remaster)
- Platforms: PlayStation 2 Nintendo Switch; PlayStation 4 Windows; Xbox One
- Release: PlayStation 2: JP: March 7, 2002; NA: August 27, 2002; PAL: October 4, 2002; Nintendo Switch, PlayStation 4, Windows, Xbox One: WW: May 23, 2025
- Genres: Action-adventure, hack and slash
- Mode: Single-player

Onimusha 2: Samurai's Destiny, released in Japan as Onimusha 2 (鬼武者2, Onimusha Tsū), is a 2002 action-adventure game developed and released by Capcom for the PlayStation 2. It is the second installment in the Onimusha series and was released in March 2002. Set in medieval Japan, the plot revolves around a new protagonist, Jubei Yagyu, who is on a quest of revenge as he battles a demon army led by Nobunaga Oda, a sinister warlord who eliminated the Yagyu clan. Across his quest, Jubei learns of his oni heritage which grants him powers to slay the demons and meets new allies who also wish to defeat Nobunaga and his army of Genma.

The game retains the action elements from its predecessor such as the use of multiple special weapons that can be upgraded with souls collected from defeated enemies. Apart from the main character, the game features four playable sub-characters, each of whom shares a part in the story. The player's actions determine which characters will decide to help Jubei in his quest. These characters were added by the Capcom staff to give a bigger depth to the game and expand the game's feeling of adventure. Each character that the player befriends will have different cutscenes as well as personal story arcs that Jubei gets to experience, although the main narrative will largely remain the same. There are certain characters or cutscenes that cannot be experienced on the same playthrough, due to plot reasons.

Publications for video games generally praised Onimusha 2 for its branching storyline paths, music, re-playability, and for keeping the action elements from its predecessor and adding new gameplay elements, although the game was criticized for abandoning its RPG element about 40% of the way through and for its similarity to the original game. Also, the American release did not contain the Japanese audio unlike the first game. The graphics and the CGI intro were highly praised.

== Gameplay ==
Samurai's Destiny features a control scheme found in many survival horror games published by Capcom, most notably Resident Evil. Other similarities include open-ended gameplay, the use of herbs and medicine to restore health, and the inclusion of puzzles which must be solved in order to progress. Hostile demons known as Genma inhabit most areas, and will attack and chase Jubei. Jubei collects an assortment of short and long-range weapons throughout the game, including a bow and a matchlock rifle. Jubei is able to use magic by wielding element-based weapons. When wielding these weapons, Jubei can perform a stronger elemental attack at any time.

In order to discourage button mashing, the player is rewarded for performing "Issen" hits on Genma. Issen occur when the player initiates an attack the moment an enemy is about to lunge forward. A bright flash will appear if the move was successful, and the target enemy will die instantly. If a group of Genma surround Jubei, he will be able to chain several Issen hits together, mowing down the entire group. Also Jubei can find hidden scrolls which teaches him extra moves to use against his enemies. These moves can be inputted at anytime except for the end of a combo. They can be used to create different combos of attacks although the battle system is still mainly focused on timing and counter-attacking, as opposed to the flashy fast combo system of Devil May Cry.

Jubei attacks Ginghamphatts in his Onimusha state. When the purple bar disappears, Jubei will return to his human form.

Shortly into the game, Jubei gains the ability to absorb the souls of defeated Genma. Jubei can attract any orbs in the vicinity and draw them into his hand, provided that he is standing close enough. Demons Souls are differentiated by the color of the orb: the most common type, red orbs, act as experience points which can be spent to improve Jubei's weapons and armor. Yellow orbs will restore a character's health. Blue orbs recharge magic ability. The rarest variety is the purple orb temporarily powers up Jubei into an "Onimusha", increasing his attack damage and becoming invincible. Unlike the red, blue, and yellow orbs, the players do not necessary need to kill an enemy for the purple orbs to show, as purple orbs sometimes come out as they hit the enemies with weapons or kicks. Unlike Onimusha 3 (which allows the players to transform into an Onimusha at the push of a button after getting 5 purple souls), Jubei cannot transform into an Onimusha as he likes, and will automatically transform into an Onimusha whenever he has 5 orbs (whether the player wants to transform or not). This was changed in the 2025 remaster of the game, allowing the player to transform into the Onimusha state at the player's discretion after collecting five purple orbs.

Samurai's Destiny features a gold mining town called Imasho which is free of enemy encounters. The game introduces several role-playing elements into the series. In the areas surrounding Imasho, defeated Genma often leave behind piles of gold which can be spent on gifts for other characters (Ekei, Magoichi, Kotaro and Oyu). Reactions to a present will depend on that person's temperament; giving Oyu a bouquet of flowers will make her happy, whereas giving it to a male recipient will simply irritate them. Jubei's gift-giving will determine which warrior will assist him as the game progresses, and will in turn influence the story. In some cases, if the player fails to win a character over, that person will opt to shun or betray Jubei later on.

At certain points in the story, control may be passed to another character for a short period. These side-quests often begin with Jubei finding himself ambushed, trapped, or incapacitated, requiring one of his allies to help him. During these events, the sub-character can equip a bracelet which imbues them with the same soul-absorbing power which Jubei wields.

== Plot ==
Since the death of Fortinbras by the hands of Samanosuke, Nobunaga Oda has taken command of the Genma as he continues his campaign to unite Japan while wiping out any threat to his power. Among the villages he targeted is the Yagyu village. The clan's only survivor, Jubei Yagyu, who was away at the time of the Genma attack, finds the destroyed village and goes to search for the culprit. He encounters a female oni named Takajo (高女) who explains Nobunaga's actions. Revealing herself as Jubei's mother, Takajo unleashes Jubei's Oni powers and tells him to search for five orbs that were created to protect humans from demons. Jubei then embarks on a quest to find the orbs in order to defeat Nobunaga, first traveling to the mining town of Imasho.

In the town of Imasho, Jubei witnesses a group of villagers sexually harassing Oyu. As Oyu fights them off he notices that she has an Oni orb. He comes in to rescue her and fights the villagers as Oyu disappears into the mines. Before entering the mines, Jubei meets Ekei and Magoichi and Kotaro Fuma. Jubei meets a demon called Ginghamphatts, who battles Jubei but loses. Ginghamphatts tells Jubei he will return before dying. Jubei finds out that there is a secret entry into the demon world from the mines and enters, finding himself transported to Gifu Castle. In Gifu Castle Jubei meets Hideyoshi Toyotomi and finds out of him that the Oda clan wanted him dead, thus attacking his village. Jubei saves Oyu from Hideyoshi Toyotomi before getting into a fight with Gogadantess, a self proclaimed "greatest swordsman of all the demons". Jubei is unable to damage Gogadantess and chooses to escape with Oyu. Back at Imasho Town, Oyu gifts Jubei her Oni orb for saving her. While investigating Imasho Town, Jubei meets a demon named Jujudormah, who reveals to Jubei she was sent by Nobunaga to kill Jubei and his mother. Jujudormah leaves for Yagyu Village as Jubei gives chase.

Jubei returns to Yagyu Village but is unable to save his mother in time. Vowing revenge, he finds a secret passage out of the village and in the process fights against a resurrected Ginghamphatts. Jubei kills him again before fighting and killing Jujudormah. Jubei discovers an Oni vessel and activates it, which it then proceeds to take Jubei to the Oni Sacred Island. While on the island he fights Gogadantess again but is still unable to damage him. Jubei is wounded in the process but Oyu saves him. Gogadantess praises Oyu's strength and berates Jubei for having to be saved by a woman for a second time. Gogadantess stops his battle and leaves, but decides to tell Jubei Nobunaga's plan. As Jubei rest, Oyu explores the island, meeting the ghost of Jubei's mom and getting the sacred flute for Jubei, which will help Jubei defeat Gogadantess. Oyu returns to Jubei with the flute and Jubei uses it when he meets Gogadantess again for the third time in the lower level of the island. Oyu also reveals to Jubei that her real name is Oichi, Nobunaga's sister, and she came into Imasho looking to assassinate Nobunaga. After dispelling the barrier that protects Gogadantess, Jubei kills him. Before dying, Jubei praises Gogadantess' skills and reaffirms to him that he truly is the "greatest swordsman of all the demons". Gogadantess thanks Jubei and gives him his Oni orb before dying. Oyu and Jubei finds a flying machine and catches up to Hideyoshi Toyotomi who is piloting a war zeppelin. Jubei takes control of the zeppelin while Hideyoshi Toyotomi escapes, detonating explosions in the process.

As the zeppelin descends, Jubei is able to maneuver it enough to crash into Gifu Castle where Nobunaga resides. In the process, Oyu falls with the zeppelin as it explodes. Jubei grieves for Oyu's death and makes his way to Nobunagas chamber, fighting and finally killing Ginghamphatts for the final time. Before confronting Nobunaga, Oyu is revealed to have survived the explosion and embraces Jubei. Jubei tells her to return home as Nobunaga is his fight to take, and not burdening her with having to fight her own brother. Jubei confronts Nobunaga and seemingly defeats Nobunaga after a hard battle. As Jubei begins to leave, Nobunaga gets back up and uses his power to suck Jubei into the demon world. In the demon world, Jubei finally understands the power of the Oni Orbs and uses them to turn him into the ultimate Oni warrior. Jubei destroys Nobunaga again for the final time, but before dying Nobunaga threatens Jubei that he may have won for now, but he will rise again. Gifu Castle begins to collapse and Jubei is last seen escaping the castle and disappearing into the darkness. In a post credit scene, Jubei is shown sitting on a horse at the edge of a mountain overlooking a castle in the distance. It is shown that Oyu resides there with her family and has finally embraced being a mother and wife. Jubei leaves on his horse as a raven flies by, laughing in the voice of Nobunaga.

== Development ==
The first sequel to Onimusha: Warlords was confirmed by Capcom in April 2001 when it was released in America. This quick announcement was made because Onimusha 2 was developed alongside Warlords. The game's story and characters were revealed in June of that same year. The hero Jubei Yagyu was modelled after the late Japanese actor Yūsaku Matsuda. While the game is graphically similar to its predecessor, the character models look more realistic and the backgrounds were given more animations, such as using real footage of water for lakes and river. One of these scenes which includes down-pouring of rain was made as a homage to the staff's favorite film, Seven Samurai.

Onimusha 2: Samurai's Destiny was made by a different team from the one that made the first game. The team implemented a bigger focus in adventure rather than action for this game in order to give more depth. Like the original Onimusha, this game was also originally planned to be released for the PlayStation but the release of the PlayStation 2 made the team change it to the new console. Producer Keiji Inafune saw this game as a way to include many things he wanted in the first game but in the end could not.

The music in the game was composed by Hideki Okugawa. Japanese musician Tomoyasu Hotei contributed to the game with the theme "Russian Roulette" which is used as the game's alternate intro theme.

== Release ==
Onimusha 2 was originally released in Japan on March 7, 2002, followed by the releases in North America on August 27 and Europe on October 4. The game was also re-released with its Warlords and Demon Siege into the 2008 compilation Onimusha Essentials for North America.

The same day the game was released in Japan, Capcom also published a fan DVD containing a guide and movies featuring the development staff. A 44-track CD original soundtrack was released by Capcom on March 20, 2002, while ADV Films published it in North America next year on June 3. The soundtrack Onimusha 2 Orchestra Album ~ Taro Iwashiro Selection was also released in 2003.

== Remaster ==
A remaster was released on May 23, 2025, for Nintendo Switch, PlayStation 4, Windows, and Xbox One. The remastered edition gives the option of using a 360 degree analog control or the classic tank controls. The game runs at 60fps at high resolution. It can be played in widescreen or original 4:3. All of the mini games and bonus materials are unlocked at the start, along with a new costume for people who preordered the game. Additionally, there is an updated gameplay. One new feature includes the ability to switch weapons in game with the click of a button, as opposed to the original where the player constantly needed to enter the pause menu to switch weapons. Jubei can now transform into an Onimusha manually and he no longer automatically transform whenever he gets 5 purple orbs, whether the player wanted to or not. Also for the first time there is an option for Japanese dialogue.

The narrator has also been changed and re-recorded to have more accurate pronunciation of Japanese words. There is a new "Hell" difficulty in which the player dies in one hit. Other content include an artwork showing different models of characters as well as storyboard, and a music player to listen to the soundtrack. Some minor contents from the original release was removed, such as the short "making of" mini-clip that could be viewed in the special option, the short teaser for Onimusha 3 that was unlocked after finishing the game, and the music video that plays if the player stays idled on the title screen for a moment. There is no new content added into the main game.

== Reception ==
Reception

Aggregate scores
Aggregator	Score
Metacritic	84/100
OpenCritic	64% recommend(Remaster) (Note: Based on 98 reviews)

Review scores
Publication	Score
Famitsu	9/10, 9/10, 9/10, 9/10
GameRevolution	B+
GameSpot	7.9/10
GameSpy	4/5
IGN	8.9/10
PALGN	8/10

Onimusha 2 was a commercial success in Japan, ranking as the 3rd best-selling video game of 2002. By April 2002, the game has shipped over a million copies in Japan having faster sales than its predecessor. During that year, it was also the third best selling game in the country. As of May 2008, it has sold over 1.9 million copies worldwide. Capcom VP of Strategic Planning and Business Development Christian Svensson referred to Onimusha 2 and its predecessor as one of their most successful titles, but the staff noted it had poor sales in Europe. As a result, they tried appealing to the European fans by adding more Western tones to their next work, Onimusha 3: Demon Siege.

Before its release, IGN awarded it as the "Best Adventure Game" from E3 2002 for the PlayStation 2. Onimusha 2 received praise for its gameplay and presentation. It has been praised for retaining the action elements from its predecessor and adding replay value, but the use of the D-pad rather than the joystick's left analogue to control Jubei has been the subject of criticism as players would have difficulties getting used. While Jeremy Jastrab from PALGN praised the new Gift system for motivating the player to explore more, Chandronait from GameSpy was disappointed by the characters' relationships being affected by gifts rather than decisions. It has also been criticized for its camera which sometimes makes combat difficult. Although IGN's Jeremy Dunhan acknowledged this issue, he noted that there were several improvements over the original game. Dunhan summed it up as "bigger, bloodier, and deeper than its predecessor, Onimusha 2: Samurai's Destiny is on many levels the perfect sequel". Reviewers also acknowledged the game had a short length despite the new gameplay elements but still found the replay value to favor it.

In regards to the presentation, response has been mixed with graphics and the soundtrack being praised, and the English dub a hit or miss. The graphics have been well received for its appealing CGI scenes as well as character models. The pre-rendered backgrounds were also highly praised for being highly detailed and realistic in certain areas. Despite finding the plot too similar to Warlords, Greg Kasavin from GameSpot praised the game's presentation for balancing action and cutscenes, but criticized the lack of its original Japanese audio leaving the players to listen to an English dub that was deemed as "mediocre". Agreeing with Kasavin, Chandronait found that the plot was also affected by a poor script localization. While Chandronait found Oyu's character and her relationship with Jubei stereotypical, she found the other characters more enjoyable. IGN's Jeremy Dunhan saw Jubei as a more interesting character than Samanosuke Akechi from Warlords based on his personality and actions. The game's ending was also criticized for being very short and sudden.

IGN later listed it as the 45th best PlayStation 2 game. GameSpot also listed as a nominee in the category "Best Action Adventure Game" during 2002. GamesRadar listed Onimusha 2 as one of the titles they want to be rereleased in an HD collection. In the Japan Game Awards from 2001 and 2002, Onimusha 2 received the "Award for Excellence".
