= Tricot =

Tricot may refer to:

- Tricot (fabric)
- Tricot, Oise, a commune in France

== Music ==
- Tricot (band), a Japanese math rock group
  - Tricot discography
- Tricot Machine, a Canadian indie pop group
