= Barry Burton =

- Resident Evil character
- Barry Burton in Resident Evil: Revelations 2 (2015)
- First appearance: Resident Evil (1996)
- Created by: Shinji Mikami; Isao Ohishi
- Designed by: Jun Takeuchi; Kenichi Iwao
- Voiced by: English: Barry Gjerde (Resident Evil) Ed Smaron (Resident Evil 2002 remake) Jamieson Price (Resident Evil 5 and Resident Evil: The Mercenaries 3D) Michael McConnohie (Resident Evil: Revelations 2); Japanese: Yusaku Yara (Resident Evil 2002 remake, Resident Evil: Revelations 2)
- Portrayed by: Greg Smith (Resident Evil live-action cutscenes); Kevin Durand (Resident Evil: Retribution)

In-universe information
- Nationality: American

Barry Burton (Note: Known in Japan as Barī Bāton (バリー・バートン)) is a character in Resident Evil (Biohazard in Japan), a survival horror series created by the Japanese company Capcom. He was first introduced as a supporting character in the original Resident Evil (1996) and became a player character in Resident Evil: Revelations 2 (2015).

Created by director Shinji Mikami and designer Isao Ohishi, Barry Burton was added to the first Resident Evil game late in development. They originally envisioned a muscular cyborg named Gelzer, before deciding that the game should emphasize horror instead of science fiction. Burton re-used some of Gelzer's design and story elements, such as his massive stature, military background, and status as a member of the Special Tactics And Rescue Service (STARS). Video game publications have described Barry as among the best and most likable characters in the Resident Evil franchise. Several publications also praised the character's writing, and he has gained popularity due to his awkward dialogue in the original Resident Evil game.

== Concept and design ==
Barry Burton was created by director Shinji Mikami and designer Isao Ohishi, and first introduced in Capcom's 1996 survival horror video game Resident Evil. Unlike mainstay characters Chris Redfield and Jill Valentine, Burton was not included in the original game design. According to writer Kenichi Iwao, he had initially designed a cyborg character named Gelzer, before deciding that his science fiction elements were inappropriate for the game's horror aesthetic. Some of Gelzer's design elements were recycled for Burton, including his large stature and military experience. Burton also took on some of the story elements previously intended for Gelzer, such as rescuing Valentine from being crushed in a locked room with a descending ceiling.

Iwao wanted a name that was easy to remember, so he chose the alliterative name Barry Burton. Initially, Iwao wanted Burton to be a black character, but his final design became white after opposition from designer Hideki Kamiya. For the first Resident Evil, designer Jun Takeuchi helped create the in-game character model. He suggested giving Burton a red vest to help differentiate him from the other characters. Mikami thought Burton's model was too slim, so he made him a little heftier, but not so much that the character became unrealistic.

=== Voice-over and live-action actors ===
Barry Gjerde voiced Barry Burton in his initial appearance in the American release of the original Resident Evil. Barry is played in the game's live-action cinematics by a retired principal, Greg Smith. Smith, an Australian on work exchange in Japan at the time, recalls earning the role due to his resemblance to the character design, as well as his ability to act as a "rudimentary character that stifles around, stiff-legged. [...] It was close to 2,000 dollars American a day or something. It was good money back in 1995."

The character was later voiced by Ed Smaron in the remake of Resident Evil, Michael McConnohie in Resident Evil: Revelations 2, and Jamieson Price in both Resident Evil 5 and Resident Evil: The Mercenaries 3D. In Japan, he was voiced by Yusaku Yara for both the original Resident Evil and its remake, as well as Resident Evil: Revelations 2. For the live-action film Resident Evil: Retribution, Burton was played by Kevin Durand.

== Appearances ==
=== In the Resident Evil series ===
In the Resident Evil series of games, Barry Burton appears as a member of the Special Tactics and Rescue Service (S.T.A.R.S.) alpha team. He makes his debut in the first Resident Evil game, which is set in a mansion near the fictional town of Raccoon City in 1998. Burton and his team search the mansion for their colleagues, where he is the secondary protagonist in a Jill Valentine campaign. Burton helps discover that the property is a façade for a biological warfare laboratory operated by the Umbrella Corporation, and its undead occupants are the scientists who developed the T-virus mutagen. Their commander, Albert Wesker, is revealed to be a double agent for Umbrella. Burton, Valentine, and Chris Redfield are among the five survivors of the incident, who form a strong relationship around their shared opposition to bioterrorism. Burton returns in Resident Evil 3: Nemesis (1999); depending on the player's decisions, he may appear to help Valentine and Carlos Oliveira escape from Raccoon City as it is destroyed.

Burton becomes a playable character in the spinoff game Resident Evil: Revelations 2 (2015). While making Resident Evil: Revelations 2, Michiteru Okabe responded to Burton's popularity by adding his daughter, Moira, as a playable character. Set in 2011, Burton travels to an island after receiving a distress call from his estranged daughter, Moira, who is trapped with Redfield's sister, Claire. Soon after arriving, Barry meets a young girl called Natalia Korda, with whom he searches for Moira and Claire among the island's monsters. Natalia had met the two women, but was separated from them by antagonist Alex Wesker. Burton arrives in time to interrupt Wesker's efforts to transfer her soul into Natalia. Burton initially believes that Alex killed Moira, and eventually defeats her with the help of Moira and Claire. It is revealed in the "good ending" that Alex succeeded in transferring her consciousness into Natalia so she may live on.

=== Other appearances ===
Burton appears as a playable character in the Game Boy Color game Resident Evil Gaiden (2001), being sent to locate Leon after he goes missing while investigating a cruise ship that is rumored to host Umbrella's latest experiments. He also appears in the mobile game Resident Evil: Genesis (2008), as well as Resident Evil: The Mercenaries 3D (2011). There is also a Mercenaries Reunion minigame in Resident Evil 5: Gold Edition (2015), in which Burton is also a playable character. In 2025, he also appears in a mobile game Resident Evil Survival Unit.

Barry appears in the non-canon live-action Resident Evil film Resident Evil: Retribution (2012). He appears in several comic books based on the games, and he is a character in Bandai's Resident Evil Deck Building Card Game (2011). Capcom's themed restaurant Biohazard Cafe & Grill S.T.A.R.S., which opened in Shibuya, Tokyo, in 2012, sold a noodle dish named after him.

== Reception ==
Barry has received mostly positive reviews, mainly due to his personality. He was deemed the best Resident Evil character by Zac Thompson of Bloody Disgusting, who commented, "No other character in the series evokes such a sense of excitement with little more than their presence alone." Eurogamer's Aoife Wilson posted a video tribute to Barry, describing him a "big confused colt-wielding teddy bear" who "has always been there for Jill when she needs him, and frequently shows up at the right times." According to Melissa Sarnowski of Screen Rant, Barry's series debut made him the best non-player character due to his "clever one-liners and well-rounded biography". Maxwell McGee of GamesRadar+ called Barry a "comedy goldmine" and "a fan-favorite among Resident Evil fans, most notably for his voice actor's amazing work" in the original Resident Evil game. The staff of IGN described Barry as "a charismatic buffoon with a heart of gold, and out of all the characters you'll meet playing Resident Evil, he's the most likeable."

The first Resident Evil game, according to digital media scholar Esther MacCallum-Stewart, gained notoriety for its "very clunky dialogue and voice acting, an element which lent the otherwise suspenseful game an element of charm that endeared it to players." Although the weak dialogue might be attributed to poor translation of the original Japanese text, she argues that it inadvertently helped differentiate the series from its rivals. Several lines from the game achieved enduring popularity: "You were almost a Jill sandwich", a remark made by Barry in an unnatural voiceover after a falling ceiling trap nearly crushes Jill, was brought back to life as an Internet meme ten years after the game's debut. Multiple sources have also noted the dialogue. Capcom referenced the line in several of their later games, including Dead Rising (2006), Resident Evil: Uprising (2009), Resident Evil: Revelations 2 (2015), and Resident Evil Re:Verse (2022). Another piece of dialogue spoken by Barry – "Jill, here's a lock pick. It might be handy if you, the master of unlocking, take it with you" – also gained notoriety. The quote has been also parodied for containing an excessive amount of silence between words. Both lines were removed from later editions.
