= You Will Die Here Tonight =

- Developer: Spiral Bound Interactive
- Publisher: Spiral Bound Interactive
- Engine: Unity
- Platform: Windows
- Release: WW: October 31, 2023
- Genre: Survival horror
- Mode: Single-player

You Will Die Here Tonight is a 2023 survival horror video game by Spiral Bound Interactive. Similar to Resident Evil, the players control a group of six police officers who enter a mansion of zombies. It received mixed reviews on Metacritic.

== Gameplay ==
Players control a group of six police officers who enter a mansion full of zombies. You Will Die Here Tonight is a survival horror game that plays similarly to Resident Evil. It has an isometric perspective except during combat, when it switches to first-person. Players control one character at a time. Characters who die remain dead permanently, and players switch to controlling another character. Items critical to the plot remain in the new character's possession, but anything else has to be recovered from the previous character's corpse. If all six characters die, players return to a checkpoint.

== Development ==
Developer Spiral Bound Interactive is based in Seattle. The team was influenced by childhood memories of playing Resident Evil. Their creative director said that he did not have a memory card for his PlayStation, so when he rented Resident Evil, he had to try beating it quickly without losing. Other influences include Silent Hill and The House of the Dead. You Will Die Here Tonight was prototyped in GameMaker and then reimplemented in Unity. Spiral Bound Interactive released You Will Die Here Tonight for Windows on October 31, 2023.

== Reception ==
You Will Die Here Tonight received mixed reviews on Metacritic. IGN Middle East and TechRadar praised the retro graphics, which they thought were reminiscent of Resident Evil, but GameSpot called them drab and criticized the lack of shadows. IGN and GameSpot criticized the music and permadeath implementation. Though TechRadar enjoyed the combat mechanics, both IGN and GameSpot found the combat too easy. GameSpot and TechRadar praised the puzzles. All three sites criticized the writing.
