= Tricot discography =

- Studio albums: 7
- EPs: 7
- Live albums: 1
- Singles: 22

Japanese rock band Tricot have released seven studio albums, seven extended plays (EPs), one live album and 22 singles since their formation in 2010.

Tricot established their own record label, Bakuretsu, in 2011. The band released their first three studio albums and six of their EPs under the label. Their debut album, T H E, was issued in 2013, and peaked at number 16 on the Oricon charts. After its release, original drummer Kazutaka Komaki left the band. In 2015, the trio released A N D, which peaked at number 34 in Japan. While touring for their third album, 3 (2017), it was announced that touring drummer Yusuke Yoshida was permanently joining Tricot. 3 was their first album to be co-released by Big Scary Monsters for English distribution, and Topshelf for the United States.

In 2019, prior to releasing their fourth studio album Black (真っ黒) (2020), Tricot formed a new label under Cutting Edge (owned by Avex Inc.), called 8902, which has hosted all their preceding music. Tricot released a second album in 2020 called 10 to celebrate the band's tenth-year anniversary. Since then, Tricot have since released two additional albums, including their most recent from 2022, Fudeki (不出来).

== Albums ==
=== Studio albums ===
List of studio albums, with selected chart positions
Title	Details	Peak chart positions		
Title	Details	JPN	JPN Hot	US World
T H E	Released: October 2, 2013; Label: Bakuretsu; Formats: CD, LP, digital download	18	—	—
A N D	Released: March 18, 2015; Label: Bakuretsu; Formats: CD, LP, digital download	34	—	—
3	Released: May 17, 2017; Label: Bakuretsu, Big Scary Monsters, Topshelf; Formats: CD, LP, cassette, digital download	20	31	5
Black (真っ黒)	Released: January 29, 2020; Label: Cutting Edge, 8902; Formats: CD, CD and DVD set, CD and Blu-ray set, digital download	27	28	—
10	Released: October 21, 2020; Label: Cutting Edge, 8902; Formats: CD, CD and DVD set, CD and Blu-ray set, digital download	48	42	—
Jodeki (上出来)	Released: December 15, 2021; Label: Cutting Edge, 8902; Formats: CD, CD and DVD set, CD and Blu-ray set, digital download	50	49	—
Fudeki (不出来)	Released: December 14, 2022; Label: Cutting Edge, 8902; Formats: CD, CD and DVD set, CD and Blu-ray set, digital download	—	66	—
"—" denotes a recording that did not chart or was not released in that territory.

=== Live albums ===
List of live albums, with selected chart positions
Title	Details	Peak chart positions
Title	Details	JPN DVD
Kabuku Tour 2016 Final at Akasaka Blitz	Released: November 2, 2016; Label: Bakuretsu; Formats: DVD, digital download	25

== Extended plays ==
List of extended plays, with selected chart positions
Title	Details	Peak chart positions	
Title	Details	JPN	JPN Hot
Bakuretsu Tricot San (爆裂トリコさん)	Released: August 2, 2011; Label: Bakuretsu; Formats: CD, digital download	46	—
School Children and the Cosmo (小学生と宇宙)	Released: May 9, 2012; Label: Bakuretsu; Formats: CD, digital download	57	—
Bacyuun (バキューン)	Released: December 5, 2012; Label: Bakuretsu; Formats: CD, CD and 7" set, digital download	51 (Note: Peak chart position on Oricon Singles Chart)	—
A N D Pre-Release Studio Live Session	Released: March 10, 2015; Label: Bakuretsu; Formats: Digital download	—	—
Kabuku	Released: April 27, 2016; Label: Bakuretsu; Formats: CD, digital download	46	59
Tricot on Audiotree Live	Released: July 3, 2018; Label: Audiotree; Formats: Digital download	—	—
Repeat (リピート)	Released: March 20, 2019; Label: Bakuretsu; Formats: CD, digital download	34	83
"—" denotes a recording that did not chart or was not released in that territory.

== Singles ==
List of singles, with selected chart positions, showing year released and album name
Title	Year	Peak chart positions		Album
Title	Year	JPN	JPN Hot 100	Album
"Rin to Shite Saku Hana no Gotoku" (凛として咲く花の如く) (Note: Later included as a bonus track on the limited edition of Bacyuun)	2012	—	—	Bacyuun
"99.974°C"	2013	58	—	T H E
"Oyasumi" (おやすみ)	2013	41	61	T H E
"Break"	2014	41	—	A N D
"E"	2015	53	—	A N D
"Pork Ginger" (ポークジンジャー)	2015	—	—	3
"DeDeDe"	2017	—	—	3
"Melon Soda" (メロンソーダ)	2017	—	—	3
"Potage"/"On the Boom" (ブームに乗って) (Note: Later included as bonus tracks on the physical version of Black)	2018	184	—	Black
"Afureru" (あふれる) (Note: Released as a three-track single that also featured an instrumental version and "Naka" (なか))	2019	36	—	Black
"Omae" (おまえ)	2020	—	—	10
"Summer Night Town" (サマーナイトタウン)	2020	—	—	10
"Warp"	2020	—	—	10
"Bakuro" (暴露)	2021	—	—	Jodeki
"Inai" (いない)	2021	—	—	Jodeki
"Dogs and Ducks"	2021	—	—	Jodeki
"Walking" (餌にもなれない)	2021	—	—	Jodeki
"Kayoko" (カヨコ)	2021	—	—	Jodeki
"End Roll" (エンドロールに間に合うように)	2022	—	—	Fudeki
"Aquarium" (アクアリウム)	2022	—	—	Fudeki
"Achoi" (アチョイ)	2022	—	—	Fudeki
"Call" (おとずれ)	2024	—	—	Non-album single
"—" denotes a recording that did not chart or was not released in that territory.
