= Barry Gjerde =

Norwegian actor

- Born: Oddbjørn Egil Gjerde; 13 August 1951; Vestnes, Norway
- Occupations: Voice actor; translator
- Years active: 1993–present

Barry Gjerde (born 13 August 1951) is a Norwegian voice actor who has worked for many years in Japan. He has mostly narrated various corporate projects and providing English voice acting for video games.

== Career ==
Gjerde is best known for his voicing of the character Barry Burton in the original version of Resident Evil. He also provided the voice of Rick in the game Clock Tower. In Mega Man X7 he provided the voice of Red, a rival Maverick hunter.

Gjerde also played guitar and sang for a band called Hotel No-Tell, with Ian MacDougall (vocals, guitar), Tom Gottsman (bass guitar, vocals), Jon MacKenzie (vocals, bass guitar), and John Boudreau (drums). They released an extended play in 1989.

== Filmography ==
=== Television ===
Year	Title	Role	Notes	Ref.
1995	Soar High! Isami	Black Goblin	English dub	
1996	Yawara! Special Zutto Kimo no Koto ga	Man 2		
2016	Fastening Days	Cruise Ship Captain	English dub	

=== Video games ===
Year	Title	Role	Notes	Ref.
1993	Robo Aleste			
1995	Space Griffon VF-9	Narrator		
1996	Bogey Dead 6			
1996	Resident Evil	Barry Burton	Voice, uncredited	
1996	Tobal No. 1	Announcer		
1997	Clock Tower	Rick		
1997	I.Q.: Intelligent Qube			
1997	Tobal 2	Tobal No.1 Announcer		
1998	Legend of Legaia	Mini Game		
1998	Seventh Cross: Evolution			
1999	Countdown Vampires	Sheck Gardner, Randy Jones; additional voices		
1999	Crisis Zone	Additional voices		
1999	Toy Fighter	Hero		
2000	Confidential Mission	Howard Gibson, General; additional voices		
2000	Silpheed: The Lost Planet			
2001	Bloody Roar 3	Announcer, Yugo Ogami		
2002	D.N.A.: Dark Native Apostle	Dr. Clad		
2003	Glass Rose	Ryouji Ihara, Denemon Yoshinodou	English dub	
2003	Mega Man X7	Red	English dub	
2003	Transformers Tataki	Scourge, Ultra Magnus, Octane, Shockwave		
2004	Ghost Squad	Alex Havoc		
2004	Time Crisis: Crisis Zone	Commander Kessler; Additional voices		
2005	Musashi: Samurai Legend	Master Mew	English dub	
2005	Shining Force Neo	Graham	English dub	
2006	Elebits	Narrator		
2007	Ghost Squad	Alex Havoc		
2010	Deadstorm Pirates	Joseph		
2015	Implosion - Never Lose Hope	Dr. Raymond Millar		
2016	NightCry	Vigo, Cobie		
2021	Detective Conan: The Scarlet Bullet	Newscaster B		

== Discography ==
=== Music ===
==== Hotel No-Tell ====
- 俺は外人 [Ore Wa Gaijin] (EP, 1989; B&I Records); Vocals, Guitar (all tracks)
  1. Ore Wa Gaijin (2:22)
  2. Nice People (2:17)
  3. Mind Your Own Business (2:59)
