= Onimusha: Warlords =

2001 video game

- North American PlayStation 2 box art
- Developer: Capcom
- Publisher: Capcom
- Director: Jun Takeuchi
- Producer: Keiji Inafune
- Artist: Shimako Satō
- Writers: Noboru Sugimura; Hirohisa Soda; Shin Yoshida
- Composers: Takashi Niigaki (Note: Music composition is credited in-game and via the official soundtrack to Mamoru Samuragochi, but Niigaki revealed in February 2014 that he had ghostwritten the music credited to Samuragochi throughout his career.); Rei Kondoh (remaster)
- Series: Onimusha
- Platforms: PlayStation 2, Xbox, Windows, Nintendo Switch, PlayStation 4, Xbox One
- Release: January 25, 2001: PlayStation 2; JP: January 25, 2001; NA: March 14, 2001; EU: July 6, 2001 Xbox; NA: January 29, 2002; JP: February 22, 2002; EU: March 22, 2002 Windows; CHN: July 8, 2003; RU: December 1, 2005; WW: January 15, 2019 (remaster) Switch, PlayStation 4, Xbox One; JP: December 20, 2018; WW: January 15, 2019
- Genres: Action-adventure, hack and slash
- Mode: Single-player

Onimusha: Warlords, known in Japan as Onimusha (Japanese: 鬼武者), is a 2001 action-adventure game developed and published by Capcom for the PlayStation 2. It is the first entry of the Onimusha series. An updated form as Genma Onimusha (Japanese: 幻魔 鬼武者) for the Xbox was released in 2002. The original Warlords version was ported to Microsoft Windows, although it was only available in China and Russia. A remaster for Nintendo Switch, PlayStation 4, and Xbox One was released in 2018, with a Windows version following in 2019.

The game's plot is set in the Sengoku period and focuses on the samurai Samanosuke Akechi who fights against the forces of Nobunaga Oda. After Nobunaga's death in battle, Samanosuke goes on a quest to save Princess Yuki from demons working alongside Nobunaga's forces. The player controls Samanosuke and his partner, a female ninja Kaede, in their fight against demons.

While the game borrows elements from Capcom's own Resident Evil survival horror series, such as solving puzzles and a fixed camera, the game is focused more on the action game genre with Samanosuke possessing multiple weapons that can be upgraded by defeating several enemies. Capcom originally wanted to release the game for the original PlayStation but the close release of its next generation version resulted in the project being scrapped.

Following its release, Onimusha: Warlords achieved high popularity, becoming the first PlayStation 2 game to reach one million sales. Its sales eventually surpassed two million units worldwide. The game has been well-received by video game publications and has been recognized as one of the best titles on the system. It was followed by three direct sequels for the same console, and spawn spinoffs and a 2026 reboot.

== Gameplay ==
Onimusha: Warlords features pre-rendered backgrounds. The player primarily controls swordsman Samanosuke Akechi in his fight against demons. The game balances its action elements with puzzles that involve interacting with the environments and obtaining items to make progress.

The player begins the game with a standard katana sword, and can obtain long-range weapons with limited supply. As the player progresses, the protagonist Samanosuke can gain three elemental weapons: Raizan, Enryuu and Shippuu, each with an elemental magic attack. As enemies are defeated, they release different colored souls that are absorbed by using the demon gauntlet on Samanosuke's wrist: red souls act as "currency" which can be used to upgrade weaponry, yellow souls recover health, while blue souls recover magic power which is used to perform each weapon's elemental abilities.

There are two sections are played with Samanosuke's assistant, the kunoichi Kaede. She has her own distinctive weapons and acrobatic abilities, but is unable to absorb souls. Kaede moves faster and can throw knives, but overall her controls are very similar to Samanosuke

== Plot ==
During the Battle of Okehazama, Samanosuke of the Akechi clan watches but is attacked by Imagawa Yoshimoto's men. Though Nobunaga Oda was victorious against Yoshimoto, he is fatally wounded and assumed dead. A year later, Samanosuke receives a letter from his cousin Princess Yuki of the Saitō clan for his assistance as she fears monsters are behind the disappearances of her servants. Joined by Kaede, Samanosuke arrives too late to Inabayama Castle as Yuki is abducted as he and Kaede split up to cover ground. After being defeated by a monster while trying to rescue Yuki, Samanosuke is visited by the twelve oni who give Samanosuke the power to vanquish the monsters that abducted Yuki, the Genma, and seal their souls in a mystical gauntlet. While searching for Yuki, Samanosuke finds a laboratory and encounters the Genma scientist Guildenstern, learning that the Genma have resurrected Nobunaga to serve them before slaying Guildenstern's creation Reynaldo. Samanosuke later encounters Nobunaga's servant Tokichiro as he attempts to recruit him before being reunited with Kaede as they follow the boy Yumemaru who Yuki took under her care. When Samanosuke finds Yumemaru spirited off, he learns from Tokichiro that Yuki is essential for a human sacrifice where the Genmas' god Fortinbras will bless her blood that Nobunaga will drink to gain the power to destroy the Saitō clan.

After saving Yumemaru from the Genma Marcellus, Samanosuke leaves him with Kaede as he looks for Yuki underground. But as Tokichiro traps Samanosuke, Kaede is knocked out by Genma resembling Samanosuke while Yumemaru is taken by a woman. When she awakens, Kaede is led to the prison and finds Yuki locked in a cell. Guildenstern arrives and leaves Kaede to die at the hand of a powerful Genma, only for her to kill it while escaping. Samanosuke awakens and kills his doppelgänger in the underground passage. He makes his way back into the keep and finds Yumemaru with the woman who introduces herself as the Genma Hecuba as she assumes her true form while spiriting Yumemaru into the netherworld with Samanosuke in pursuit. Joined by Kaede as he learns that her kin intends to kill Yumemaru before Yuki to heighten her sorrow to make her blood more potent for Nobunaga, Samanosuke kills Hecuba. As Samanosuke makes his way through the demon door, he encounters Guildenstern who summons an improved Marcellus. After defeating him, Samanosuke makes his way into Fortinbras' throne room, where he finds Yuki and Yumemaru trapped on the upper level. Before he can free them, Fortinbras enters the room and summons Nobunaga before the monster attacks Samanosuke. After Samanosuke defeats Fortinbras, he frees Yumemaru and Yuki as Kaede enters the room.

As they flee the collapsing chamber, Samanosuke is grabbed by Fortinbras as Kaede, Yumemaru, and Yuki are forced to escape. Some of Samanosuke's blood falls on the gauntlet and activates it as it transforms him into an Onimusha. In his Onimusha state, Samanosuke kills Fortinbras by stabbing him through his central eye. As Samanosuke transforms back into a human, he encounters Nobunaga and the two have a stare off as the room continues to collapse. It is not known what happens between Samanosuke and Nobunaga.

During the ending sequence, Yuki and Yumemaru follow Samanosuke's advice and travel the world while Kaede dies 14 years later in a battle. After the end credits, Samanosuke is seen alive, viewing Inabayama Castle from afar before he departs to parts unknown.

== Development ==
The origins for Onimusha can be traced back to 1997, when Capcom's Yoshiki Okamoto told magazine Dengeki Nintendo 64 about an idea he had for a ninja version of Resident Evil (1996) that could potentially make its way to the Nintendo 64 or 64DD. The game would be set in a "ninja house" filled with booby traps, similar to the mansion from Resident Evil, where battles are fought using swords and shuriken. In a 2003 interview with GameCenter CX, Keiji Inafune explained that the project began when he proposed a Sengoku period version of Resident Evil to company executives which he called "Sengoku Biohazard". Development began on the PlayStation with Inafune being given Resident Evil 1.5 to use a basis for the new game.

Onimusha was planned by Capcom as a trilogy. Its first title was originally being developed for the PlayStation, but the project was eventually moved to the PlayStation 2. The PlayStation version was scrapped and never released. It was about 50% complete before it was canceled. Onimusha team's excitement about the PlayStation 2's capabilities resulted in that change. They developed the game basing on the system from the Resident Evil series.

The game's plot was written by Noboru Sugimura and Flagship. The storyline was set in the Sengoku period due to how its multiple conflicts could provide an interesting background for the plot. While the historical Oda Nobunaga can be considered either a hero or a villain, Capcom chose to portray him as the latter one. Character movements were created using motion capture. Film actor and singer Takeshi Kaneshiro was the character model and Japanese voice actor for Samanosuke Akechi.

The game's orchestral music is credited in-game to composer Mamoru Samuragochi. According to Time: "To record it, Samuragoch[i] browbeat the producers into employing a 200-piece orchestra, including musicians playing such traditional instruments as a Japanese flute and taiko drums. The result is both haunting and inspirational, reminiscent of majestic scores for films like Lawrence of Arabia". Mamoru later admitted in 2014 that he directed his orchestrator Takashi Niigaki to ghostwrite the music for the game, for which Samuragochi took full credit for composition.

In the English localization of Onimusha: Warlords, the word oni was translated as ogre and the word genma as "demon". In all subsequent games in the series, the words genma and oni have remained intact in the English scripts. It was the only game within the series that gives players the option of hearing the voice acting in either English or Japanese with subtitles (this option was not provided in the UK/EU PAL version) until the fourth installment, which also had this feature.

Capcom spent $5 to $10 million marketing the PlayStation 2 release of the game.

== Genma Onimusha ==
Onimusha: Warlords was ported to the Xbox in 2002 under the title Genma Onimusha. The Xbox version contains many updates to the game, including better graphics, new gameplay additions, and a new 5.1 Dolby Digital audio. There are no new weapons added, but the player can now find three different armors to wear, a ninja shinobi outfit, a grey colored samurai armor, and a fully masked samurai armor. When equipped, the in-game character model also changes. The original armors that were found in the PlayStation 2 version have been removed. The main new explorable area is a new tower area, which when finished will give Samanosuke the best armor in the game. Outside of new armor sets, the difficulty has also been increased with new enemy placements, as well as having enemies become superpowered if they are able to absorb the new green soul before the player can. The main new enemy is a killer doll who appears in certain scripted areas, following the character and dealing major damage. The doll is invincible and Samanosuke cannot defeat the doll in the game.

Additionally, the second major difference in Genma Onimusha is the inclusion of green souls. When five green souls are in the player's possession, the player can activate temporary invulnerability with a slow health recharge. Players frequently have to enter tug-of-war scenarios with the enemies over the possession of green souls; if a green soul is absorbed by a demon, the demon will gain new attacks and they will also see a dramatic increase in their defense. They will release a greater number of souls upon death. Lastly Samanosuke can now charge his magic attacks, dealing more damage with longer charges.

== Remaster ==
A remaster for Nintendo Switch, PlayStation 4, Xbox One was released on December 20, 2018 in Japan and on January 15, 2019 in other territories. Windows version via Steam was released worldwide in January 2019. This is a remaster of the original game, and does not include any of the extra features from Genma Onimusha. The game is presented in HD, with clearer graphics and smoother framerate. New features include the ability to play in widescreen, with the screen scrolling up or down depending on the player's location. The players can choose between tank controls or full 3D movement. The soundtrack has been re-recorded due to controversy with the original composer Mamoru Samuragochi. The original model for Samanosuke, Takeshi Kaneshiro, returned to redub his lines. The player can switch weapons in-game and is no longer required to go to the items menu every time they want to change weapons, but they cannot change weapons mid-combo. The remastered version has sold over 300,000 units across all platforms.

== Reception ==
Reception

Aggregate scores
Aggregator	Score
GameRankings	PS2: 84% XBOX: 81%
Metacritic	PS2: 86/100; XBOX: 83/100; NS: 71/100; PC: 67/100; PS4: 73/100; XONE: 74/100
OpenCritic	52% recommend (Remaster) (Note: Based on 83 reviews)

Review scores
Publication	Score
Game Informer	PS2: 8.75/10
GameSpot	PS2: 8.4/10; XBOX: 8.7/10
IGN	PS2: 8.9/10; XBOX: 8.3/10
Next Generation	3/5

Onimusha: Warlords was a commercial success, selling over 2 million copies worldwide, with 1.04 million copies sold in Japan. The game went Platinum in just under a month in the region, quickly becoming the top-selling PlayStation 2 game ever at the time of its release. By July 2006, the PlayStation 2 version of Onimusha: Warlords had sold 800,000 copies and earned $28 million in the United States. Next Generation ranked it as the 75th highest-selling game launched for the PlayStation 2, Xbox or GameCube between January 2000 and July 2006 in that country. Combined sales of the Onimusha series reached 3 million units in the United States by July 2006. Capcom VP of Strategic Planning and Business Development Christian Svensson referred to the first two Onimusha games as one of their most successful titles.

The game has received positive reviews. Critics praised the graphics, sound, and gameplay, but complained about the short length of the game. In Japan, Famitsu magazine scored the PlayStation 2 version of the game a 35 out of 40, and gave the Xbox version a 34 out of 40. As of 2010, the game has a GameRankings average score of 84% for the PlayStation 2 version, and 81% for the Xbox port. The Xbox version was nominated for GameSpot's annual "Best Story on Xbox" and "Best Action Adventure Game on Xbox" awards.

Blake Fischer of Next Generation gave a three stars out of five for PS2 version, saying that Onimusha is a beautiful game, but it lacks the refinement of more modern game designs.

At the SIGGRAPH 2000 conference, Onimusha received the "Best of Show" award for its opening sequence. Complex listed it as one of the most beloved and missed PlayStation 2 games. The reviewer from GameSpot said that he was called biased multiple times when doing the article for the video game. In a 2010 retrospective, GamePro ranked it as the 28th best game for the PlayStation 2. In 2012, FHM included the game's Kaede among the nine "sexiest ninja babes in games".

The 2019 remaster received mixed-to-positive reviews from critics; while its action gameplay was praised for standing the test of time, its visuals, game design, and presentation were said to have aged poorly. The remaster's lack of the additional content found in Genma Onimusha was also met with criticism. Horror media website Bloody Disgusting gave it a 3.5/5, writing that "beneath a new lick of paint and some clever adjustments, Onimusha: Warlords doesn't make for an essential action game in 2019, but it's a great modernization all the same", while Windows Central gave the Xbox One version a 4 out of 5, calling it "not perfect by any means", but going on to state that it was a "wonderful blast from the past". In a more critical review, IGN awarded the game with a 6.5/10, the final verdict being that Onimusha: Warlords is exactly how the players remember it, but felt to be not a "good" thing.

== Legacy ==
The game spawned two direct sequels, Onimusha 2: Samurai's Destiny and Onimusha 3: Demon Siege, that followed Samanosuke and more warriors in their fight against Nobunaga Oda. While Demon Siege was the closing chapter of the story, Capcom developed Onimusha: Dawn of Dreams due to popular fan response. There have been two spin-offs, Onimusha Tactics and Onimusha Blade Warriors, that focus on different genres. A bug within Warlords inspired game designer Hideki Kamiya in the making of the action game Devil May Cry.
