= VF 9 =

VF 9 may refer to:

- VinFast VF 9
- Space Griffon VF-9
