= Soar High! Isami =

Japanese anime television series

- 飛べ!イサミ
- Developed by: Hideo Takayashiki; Tomoko Konparu
- Directed by: Gisaburō Sugii (chief); Tatsuo Satō
- Country of origin: Japan
- Original language: Japanese
- No. of episodes: 50

Production
- Producers: Hideki Shigeteki; Atsushi Kitamura; Mikio Ōji
- Animator: Group TAC
- Production company: NHK

Original release
- Network: NHK Educational TV
- Release: April 8, 1995 – March 30, 1996

Soar High! Isami (飛べ！イサミ, Tobe! Isami) is an anime series made by Group TAC and directed by Gisaburō Sugii. The anime is based on The Hakkenden but is set in the future. The anime was broadcast on NHK between April 8, 1995, and March 30, 1996. It was licensed by Hirameki International in the USA. The NHK Enterprises export catalog calls it Isami's Incredible Shinsen Squad.

== Plot ==
Isami Hanaoka is just a fifth grader who happens to be a descendant of the Shinsengumi. Together with fellow descendants and classmates Soushi Yukimi and Toshi Tsukikage, she discovers strange artifacts in the basement of her home, left behind by their ancestors, as well as a message urging them to "fight the evil Kurotengu organization".

== Characters ==
Main Characters

- Isami Hanaoka: 11 years old, after living all her life in the United States she transferred to Oedo elementary school in Japan. The disappearance of her father is the reason why he covered his face in bandages, black sunglasses, a hat and coat in order to prevent his own identity from being revealed. Her weapon is the Dragon Sword, a sword that has a hexagonal design in the bottom of the handle with the symbol of a dragon. The power of the sword is invoked with the slogan "The Dragon is the symbol of justice, while there is evil in the world we will fight in the name of Good. Shinsengumi, forward!" Her name comes from Kondō Isami. Voiced by Michiyo Nakajima (Japanese) and Rumiko Varnes (English)
- Toshi Tsukikage: Classmate of Isami and Soushi, with whom he had a little incident on the first day of class. He is a passionate fan of the army and go Ganbaman Virtual and secretly loves shojo anime "Magic Fairy Lynn Love." His weapon of struggle will be the Eye of the Dragon, a spiritual, strong and powerful sphere, throwing his own legs, and he loves football. His name comes from Hijikata Toshizō. Voiced by Yoshiko Kamei (Japanese) and Sean Nichols (English).
- Soushi Yukimi: Classmate of Isami and Toshi. Attractive, handsome, womanizing and impetuous, he is able to draw a red rose at any time as long as they put romantic. His weapon is fighting Dragon Fangs; to use his spiritual power, he must unite the two fangs to deploy a luminous bow with arrows. His name comes from Okita Sōji. Voiced by Noriko Hidaka (Japanese) and Jeremy Felton (English).
- Kei Tsukikage: The younger brother of Toshi, always mounted on his tricycle, a vehicle capable of flying with an umbrella in the sky. Like his brother he is also a big fan of Ganbaman. His name comes from Yamanami Keisuke. Voiced by Yuko Mita (Japanese) and Terry Osada (English).

Ancestors

The former members of Shinsengumi who lived in the last days of the Tokugawa era, ancestors of families Hanaoka, Tsukikage and Yukimi. Those who able to use the mineral Luminotita to transform it into spiritual energy. Were the creators of the three spiritual weapons.

- Ichisaku Hanaoka
- Juurou Tsukikage
- Sensuke Yukimi

Hanaoka Family

- Kanyusai Hanaoka: Grandfather of Isami. Doing the housework in general on behalf of Reiko, he is also good in cooking. He loves teddy bear is also a member of the "Oedo Bear Friend". In addition, skilled in martial arts, sword (harisen) in easily defeating multiple of crow Tengu, has been impressive victory Watariai and armor Tengu in the spear. Occasionally or doing Rokyoku, there seems to be was also told Sakigake. In the end he becomes a "mysterious person" wonder man white hood to fight the black Tengu party to help Shenzhen set. The origin of the name is Takeda Kanryūsai. Voiced by Koichi Kitamura (Japanese) and Michael Naishtut (English).
- Reiko Hanaoka: Mother of Isami. A newscaster, serves as the main host of the "Good Morning 7" show. Isami and her grandfather watch it every morning. Voiced by Kikuko Inoue (Japanese) and Terry Osada (English).
- Kai Hanaoka: Father of Isami. Physicist who had studied the Luminotita. He wears bandages to cover his face like a mummy, black sunglasses, large black hat and long thick coat in order to hide his identity because to avoid of being chased by black Tengu party which explains of his disappearance. He has gained training of Rumi field flow Ninjutsu, also very high skills of combat. In the first half of the series he had called himself "The Man of the Wild Rose." Voiced by Koji Ishii.
- Kazuma Sakamoto: Isami's uncle (Reiko's younger brother). Single. He is a detective of the Oedo police. Not a little rely on such or given a hint to Isami and her friends who also follow a variety of incidents. The approach of the stalker no better love and eagerly far, but has been idle entirely. Come to eat rice too often Hanaoka house in the name of "investigation incidentally of". The second half of the series he was in also in love with Ruriko. The origin of the name is Sakamoto Ryōma. Voiced by Kenichi Ono.

Tsukikage & Yukimi Family

- Yasuyuki Tsukikage: Father of Toshi and Kei. Voiced by Hirohiko Kakegawa.
- Jan Tsukikage: Mother of Toshi and Kei. Voiced by Mami Horikoshi.
- Eisuke Yukimi: Father of Soshi. Voiced by Hideyuki Umezu.
- Orie Yukimi: Mother of Soshi. Voiced by Sakurako Kishiro.

Oedo Elementary School

- Haruka Takagi: Isami's homeroom teacher. As innocent, sweet and natural as a child, in fact she is the descendant of Rumi clan and fights black Tengu party as a Kunoichi, to support Isami, Soshi and Toshi. Loosely based on Yamazaki Susumu. Voiced by Yoko Sasaki (Japanese) and Soness Stevens (English).
- Mayuko Kiyokawa: Isami's classmate. She wears a ponytail with a ribbon. She has a crush on Soushi. She is voiced by Kikuko Inoue.
- Izumi Maki: Isami's classmate. She has a long black hair and she's very silent. She is voiced by Kumiko Watanabe.
- Miho Shimada: Isami's classmate. She wears glasses and a bow on her head. She's Isami's female best friend. She is voiced by Mami Horikoshi.
- Kantaro Egawa: Isami's classmate. An overweight boy who is fascinated with UFOs. He is voiced by Urara Takano.

Villains

- Black Tengu (Black Goblin in the English dub): The main antagonist of the series. The Leader of The Black Goblin Organization (Black Tengu Faction). He is voiced by Ikuo Nishikawa (Japanese) and Barry Gjerde (English).
- Golden Tengu: He is wearing a golden Tengu mask with a smiling face. He is voiced by Minoru Inaba.
- Silver Tengu: He is the leader of the Four Heavenly Kings, a man who wears a silver mask. Do not allow the evil ways of evil people who advance the righteous evil. Has mastered the martial arts (?) That lightning flow, it is bizarre attack like emits light bullets. Under the mask filled with beautiful. In refreshing demeanor, "what a bummer Do ~" is habit. Nori is good, seems to have also undertaken such as the chairmanship of the party rally. Good luck was subordinates salary up, such as appear on the scene with a pledge to intervals of work, concern for subordinates it is also fine. The spur-of-the-moment situation seems will take the action that was natural "ally of justice", also in Shenzhen set would have been told to thank the "Silver Tengu's thank you!" In the table face Serizawa Heavy Industries president, (albeit in the mid-joke) self-proclaimed "Ruriko fiancee". He is voiced by Kenichi Ono.
- Armor Tengu: Dressed in armor, fight using the martial arts (mainly sword and spear). Often warring with the gimmick Tengu. Voiced by Hideyuki Umezu / Mami Horikoshi.

The Niihao Sisters

- Jasmine: The eldest of the sisters. Her combat capability is very high. A narcissist, she has seen her own face in the mirror if they have spare time. She is voiced by Yuko Mizutani.
- Tapioca: The middle child. She is skilled in hand-in-hand combat. She is voiced by KAKO.
- Litchee: The youngest of the sisters. She specializes in genjutsu using a bell, but cannot be hand-in-hand combat. She is voiced by Kitai Sakurako.

== Theme music ==
Opening Themes
#	Transcription/Translation	Performed by	Episodes
1	Haato o miga kukkyanai (ハートを磨くっきゃない, I'll just have to polish heart)	Tokio	1–50

Ending themes
#	Transcription/Translation	Performed by	Episodes
1	Round Trip ~Sono te o hanasanai de~ (Round Trip ～その手を離さないで～, Round Trip ~Never separate the hand~)	SEEK	1–33
2	Makerumonka! (負けるもんか！, I don't lose!)	BUKABUKA	34–50
