= Megumi Matsushita =

Japanese actress (born 1981)

- 松下 恵
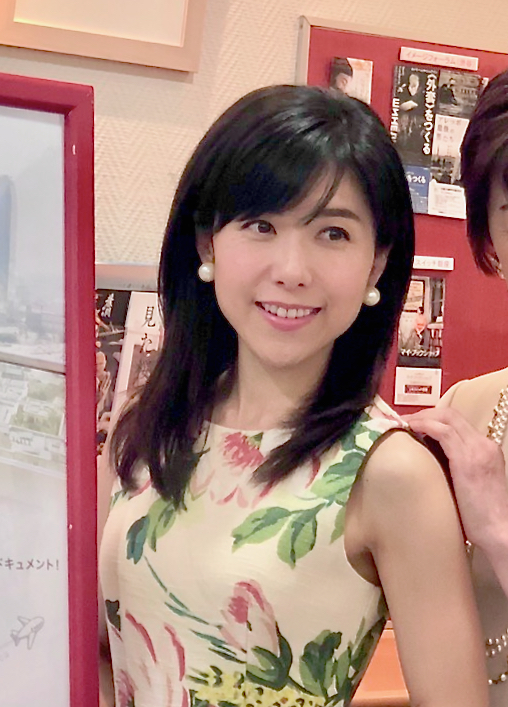
- Matsushita 2019 at the Premier of Wake Up in America
- Born: 16 January 1981 (age 45); Shibuya, Tokyo, Japan
- Occupation: Actress
- Years active: 1993–present
- Agent: Toei Company
- Height: 1.51 m (4 ft 11 1/2 in)

Japanese name
- Kanji: 松下 恵
- Hiragana: まつした めぐみ
- Katakana: マツシタ メグミ
Transcriptions
- Romanization: Megumi Matsushita
- Website: https://megumimatsushita.com

Megumi Matsushita (松下 恵, Megumi Matsushita; born 16 January 1981) is a Japanese actress.

== Biography ==
Megumi Matsushita was born in Tokyo, Japan, on January 16, 1981. Her mother is Rumi Sakakibara, a renowned actress in Japan, and her businessman father, Motoh Matsushita. She has no siblings. Her booking agent is Toei Company.

Megumi made her acting debut at 11 years old, when she appeared on a TV show with her mother. Because of this performance, she was scouted by the Horipro agency. The next year, she made her television debut in the drama Kachosan no Yakudoshi (1993) as Akemi, the daughter of the main character.

In 1995, she played class leader Rumi Imaruoka in the TV drama Sannen B-gumi Kinpachi-sensei from October 1995 to March 1996.

When she was 16, she played the main character Natsumi in the feature film Remembering the Cosmos Flower (1997), which was awarded Best Feature Film by the Idyllwild International Festival of Cinema in 1997.

Also in 1997, Megumi began working in the theater. She made her first appearance on stage as Wendy in the musical Peter Pan. That same year, she would also play Rebecca Gibbs in Thorton Wilder's Our Town. In the following years, she played the eldest daughter Liesl in the musical The Sound of Music (1998) and the main character Midori in Ichiyō Higuchi's Takekurabe (1998). The next year, she played Fredrika Armfelt in Stephen Sondheim's A Little Night Music.

In other endeavors, she was the voice of Fiorina in the animated film 3000 Leagues in Search of Mother (1998) and played the main character Hitomi Hayama in Another Mind (1998), an adventure game created by Square for the PlayStation. She was the hostess of NHK's German study TV program Doitsugo Kaiwa in 1999.

In 2000, she played Princess Chinatsu in the long-running historical drama The Unfettered Shogun.

In 2001, she graduated from Aoyama Gakuin Women's Junior College. She was awarded an Associate of Arts degree in English literature.

Megumi has made guest TV appearances in Mito Kōmon (2002 and 2009), AIBOU: Tokyo Detective Duo (2008 and 2009), Ouroboros (2015), and Kasoken no onna (2018).

In film, she played Utsusemi in Sakuran (2006), the hairdresser in Exte (2007), Megu, the daughter of Gō Hideki/Ultraman Jack, in Superior Ultraman 8 Brothers (2008) and Iketani-kun's mother in A Boy and His Samurai (2010).

On the stage, she played the villain, ALIEN SALOME Ligier, in Ultraman Premiere 2011 in 2011.

She was the subject of the documentary film Wake Up in America (2019). The film was awarded "Special Thanks Award" by the Japan Film Festival of Los Angeles.
