= Mamoru Samuragochi =

Japanese composer

Mamoru Samuragochi 佐村河内 守
- Born: 21 September 1963 (age 62); Hiroshima Prefecture, Japan
- Years active: 1984–present
- Labels: Nippon Columbia
- Formerly of: Kids

Mamoru Samuragochi (佐村河内 守, Samuragōchi Mamoru; born 21 September 1963) is a Japanese composer from Hiroshima Prefecture who falsely stated that he was totally deaf. He said throughout his career that he was deaf which led to foreign media dubbing him a "digital-age Beethoven". He was also the name credited for the video games Resident Evil: Director's Cut Dual Shock Ver. (1998) and Onimusha: Warlords (2001). In February 2014, it was revealed that not only was Samuragochi not fully deaf, most of the work attributed to him over the previous 18 years had been written by Takashi Niigaki.

== Biography ==
Samuragochi was born on 21 September 1963 in Hiroshima Prefecture to parents who were both hibakusha (irradiated in the atomic bombing of Hiroshima). He started playing the piano at the age of four. He started having migraines while in high school, and said that, by the time he was 35, he had completely lost his hearing. After graduating from high school, Samuragochi did not attend university or music school, due to his dislike of modern composition methods, and he instead taught himself how to compose.

On 31 March 2013, Samuragochi was the subject of a 50-minute Japanese TV documentary titled Melody of the Soul: The Composer Who Lost His Hearing (魂の旋律 ～音を失った作曲家～, Tamashii no Senritsu: Oto o Ushinatta Sakkyokuka) and broadcast by NHK. The documentary followed him as he met survivors of the 2011 Tōhoku earthquake and tsunami in northern Japan.

== Doubts about musical abilities and deafness statements ==
In June 2013, a reporter from the magazine Aera interviewed Samuragochi at his apartment in Yokohama, but noticed a number of inconsistencies in Samuragochi's deafness statements, including his ability to respond to questions before the sign-language interpreter had finished, and standing up to answer a doorbell when it rang. The interview was ultimately not published by the magazine due to doubts about Samuragochi's statements.

When Samuragochi's first symphony was performed on tour by a full orchestra, the composer Takeo Noguchi noticed that it was an adaptation of little-known works from earlier composers like Gustav Mahler, and doubted Samuragochi's story, which was sourced entirely to his record label. Noguchi's article was turned down by musical publications, as Samuragochi's record label was one of their advertising sponsors, and instead was published in the November 2013 issue of the newsweekly Shincho 45, as "The deaf genius composer" - Is Mamoru Samuragochi genuine? (「全聾の天才作曲家」佐村河内守は本物か). After the ghostwriting was revealed, Noguchi's article was awarded the Editors' Choice Magazine Journalism Award.

== Ghostwriting admission ==
On 5 February 2014, it was publicly revealed that music attributed to Samuragochi since 1996 had actually been ghostwritten by Takashi Niigaki, a musician, composer, and part-time lecturer at the Toho Gakuen School of Music in Tokyo. Niigaki also said Samuragochi was not deaf and states that Samuragochi has normal hearing and was posing as a deaf man to generate a mystique around his image as a composer. Niigaki also said that Samuragochi did not need to use his cane, and that most of his biography printed in album liner notes was fiction. Niigaki went to the press because one of Samuragochi's "compositions" would be used by Japanese figure skater Daisuke Takahashi, at the 2014 Winter Olympics in Sochi. On 12 February 2014, Samuragochi released a handwritten statement in which he revealed that he had a Grade 2 physical disability certificate after losing his hearing and to have partially regained his hearing three years previously. He also added that he was "deeply ashamed of living a lie."

Following the revelation, the city of Hiroshima announced that it would be revoking the Hiroshima Citizens' Award it presented to Samuragochi in 2008. On 7 March 2014, he gave a press conference in Tokyo, appearing in public for the first time since the ghostwriting allegations arose. He admitted that while his hearing was impaired, it did not meet the legal requirements for deafness, and that he had returned his disability certificate.

== Previously credited works ==
The works below were formerly credited to Samuragochi, but were later identified as having been composed by Niigaki.

- No. 1 symphony "Hiroshima" (2003)
- Sonatina for Violin

Completed in 2003, "Hiroshima" was first played at a concert held to commemorate the meeting of the Group of Eight leaders in Hiroshima in 2008. It was released on CD in 2011 as part of the Nippon Columbia record label's 100th anniversary celebrations.

=== Movie soundtracks ===
- Remembering the Cosmos Flower / Cosmos (1997)
- Orpheus' Lyre / Sakura, Futatabi no Kanako (2013)

=== Video game soundtracks ===
- Resident Evil: Director's Cut Dual Shock Ver. (1998)
- Onimusha: Warlords (2001)
