= Genie High =

Japanese band

Genie High ジェニーハイ
- Origin: Tokyo, Japan
- Genres: indie pop, progressive pop
- Years active: 2018—present
- Labels: unBORDE/Warner Music Japan
- Members: Enon Kawatani (vocals, guitar); Ikkyu Nakajima (vocals, guitar); Takashi Niigaki (keyboard); Kazutoyo Koyabu (drums); Kunihiro Kawashima (bass)
- Website: genie-high.com

Genie High (ジェニーハイ) is a Japanese progressive indie band, notably fronted by Enon Kawatani (川谷 健太) of Gesu no Kiwami Otome (ゲスの極み乙女) and Ikkyu Nakajima (中嶋 イッキュウ) of Tricot (トリコ). The band includes members with various backgrounds in the Japanese entertainment scene, including controversial composer Takashi Niigaki (新垣 隆), comedian TV host Kazutoyo Koyabu (小籔 千豊) and TV personality / comedic actor Kunihiro Kawashima (川島 邦裕) also known as Kukki (くっきー!).

== Biography ==
The band was formed after Nakajima, Niigaki, and Kukki appeared regularly on the talk-show Bazooka!!!, hosted by Koyabu. The show was run as an experiment aimed at garnering attention from the press. Spelt out in katakana, the name means "transcending genius".

Since their debut, MV was released on March 15, 2018 they have gone on to release one EP and two albums, which have each enjoyed some chart success. The self-titled EP Genie High (ジェニーハイ) debuted at number 3 on the Billboard Japan "Hot Albums" chart. This was followed by the full-length release Genie High Story (ジェニーハイストーリー) in November 2019, which debuted at number 18. Then in September 2021, the band's second full-length album Genie Star (ジェニースター) debuted at number 8.

Despite the band reportedly finding it difficult to find time to perform due to their other commitments, they recorded the live performance Arena Genie (アリーナジェニー) released on DVD in January 2022.
