= Remembering the Cosmos Flower =

- Film poster
- Directed by: Junichi Suzuki
- Written by: Junichi Suzuki; Tetsuhiro Kosugi
- Based on: Autumn Cherry Blossoms by Junichi Suzuki
- Produced by: Tetsuhiro Kosugi; Kiichiro Yamazaki; Ken'ichi Hoyama
- Starring: Mari Natsuki, Akane Oda, Megumi Matsushita, Rumi Sakakibara
- Cinematography: Kazunari Tanaka
- Edited by: Shuichi Kakesu
- Music by: Takashi Niigaki (Note: Music composition is credited to Mamoru Samuragochi. Niigaki revealed in February 2014 that he had ghostwritten the music credited to Samuragochi throughout his career.)
- Distributed by: Ace Pictures Inc.
- Release date: May 3, 1997 (Japan)
- Running time: 103 minutes
- Country: Japan
- Language: Japanese

Remembering the Cosmos Flower (Japanese: 秋桜 / コスモス, Hepburn: Kosumosu), also known as Cosmos and Autumn Cherry Blossoms, is a 1997 Japanese drama film directed and co-written by Junichi Suzuki. It is the story of a Japanese girl returning to Japan after seven years in South America where she contracted AIDS. The film was based on Suzuki's own novel, first published in 1996 by Chōbunsha. Ace Pictures released Remembering the Cosmos Flower on May 3, 1997, in Japan.

== Cast ==
- Akane Oda as Akiko Sonoda
- Megumi Matsushita as Natsumi Yamakura
- Mari Natsuki as Kiyomi Sonoda, Akiko's mother
- Rumi Sakakibara as Kyoko Nibe
- Kai Shishido as Kiyoshi Matsubara
- Ken'ichi Ishii as Masayoshi Yamakura
- Satoya Matsuda as Daisuke Yamakura
- Yakkun Sakurazuka as Shuji Takada
- Toshiya Fujita as Hongu High School Principal
- Tamio Kawachi as Hongu Vice Principal
- Masahiro Noguchi as Nosaka
- Joe Shishido as Soichiro Shiratsuru
- Hisano Yamaoka as Kikuno Sonoda
- Eri Anzai as Naomi Onishi
- Asuka Okumura as Mitsue Ohno
- Sayuri Niida as Sanae Ohno
- Hayashi Tondenpei as Ota
- Shuhei Hayashi as Daitengu Sake Brewery Employee
- Maruko Hayashi as Cultural Festival Host
