= Takashi Niigaki =

Japanese composer and music teacher (born 1970)

Takashi Niigaki 新垣 隆
- Born: 1 September 1970 (age 54); Tokyo, Japan
- Occupation: Composer
- Instrument(s): Piano, keyboards
- Member of: Genie High
- Website: official website

Takashi Niigaki (新垣 隆, Niigaki Takashi; born 1 September 1970) is a Japanese composer, pianist and music teacher, known for having composed pieces on behalf of the celebrated allegedly-deaf composer Mamoru Samuragochi, and for admitting his role in this deception in 2014 prior to the use of one of his pieces at the 2014 Winter Olympics by figure skater Daisuke Takahashi.

== Biography ==
Takashi Niigaki was born in Tokyo. He is a Japanese composer and music teacher who served as the orchestrator and ghostwriter for Mamoru Samuragochi for 18 years, composing musical works that included the soundtracks for Resident Evil: Director's Cut Dual Shock Ver. and Onimusha: Warlords. He also composed "Hiroshima Symphony No 1", previously credited to Samuragochi until February 2014, when Niigaki publicly revealed that he was the real composer.

== Ghostwriting ==
On 5 February 2014, Niigaki publicly revealed that he was the ghostwriter behind most of the music previously attributed to Mamoru Samuragochi since 1996. Niigaki went to press because one of Samuragochi's claimed compositions would be used by Japanese figure skater Daisuke Takahashi, at the then upcoming 2014 Winter Olympics in Sochi.

Hiroshima Symphony No. 1 was an adaption of little-known works from earlier composers including Gustav Mahler, as observed by the composer Takeo Noguchi when it was performed on tour by a full orchestra; doubting Samuragochi's claims - sourced entirely by his record label - Noguchi wrote an article on the subject, which was turned down by musical publications sponsored by Samuragochi's record label. The article was instead published in the November 2013 issue of the newsweekly Shincho 45, as "The deaf genius composer" - Is Mamoru Samuragochi genuine? (「全聾の天才作曲家」佐村河内守は本物か); after the ghostwriting was revealed, Noguchi's article was awarded the Editors' Choice Magazine Journalism Award. Journalists have stated - albeit 'mainly in hindsight' and as part of the 'musings and self-chastisements in Japan and overseas' that occurred following the revelation of Samuragochi's deceit - that the music is 'subpar, weak imitations of Mahler and Brahms, and shouldn't have been celebrated in the first place' and 'basically an amateurish Mahler pastiche'.

== Subsequent career ==
In the wake of the scandal, Niigaki received support from friends in the music world, including composer Kenichi Nishizawa, who organized a petition to ask the institution where Niigaki taught to be lenient; Niigaki elected to resign nevertheless. A concert, 'Takashi Niigaki Collection with Friends' took place on 7 June 2014, organized by his supporters. He subsequently appeared on television, cultivating 'a reputation as a comical character on top of being recognized for his musical talent'.

In February 2015, Shigeru Kudo, leader of the Higashihiroshima Symphony Orchestra, the first amateur ensemble to perform the Hiroshima Symphony, commissioned Niigaki to compose a new symphony. On 15 August 2016, Niigaki's Symphony No. 2, 'Litany', was performed for the first time, in Hiroshima. Niigaki also gave a solo performance of his piano concerto, 'Shinsei' ('New Birth'). The second performance was in Tokyo on 23 August 2016. In producing this symphony, Niigaki was inspired by 'a form of prayer in Christianity... a back and forth between clergy and congregation', giving the work its name.

In 2018, he formed the band Genie High with Enon Kawatani, Ikkyu Nakajima, television personality Kunihiro "Kukki!" Kawashima, and comedian Kazutoyo Koyabu.

== Works ==
The works below were formerly credited to Mamoru Samuragochi, but were later identified as having been composed by Niigaki.

- No. 1 symphony "Hiroshima" (2003)
- Sonatina for Violin

Completed in 2003, "Hiroshima" was first played at a concert held to commemorate the meeting of the Group of Eight leaders in Hiroshima in 2008. It was released on CD in 2011 as part of the Nippon Columbia record label's 100th anniversary celebrations.

=== Movie soundtracks ===
- Remembering the Cosmos Flower / Cosmos (1997)
- Orpheus' Lyre / Sakura, Futatabi no Kanako (2013)

=== Video game soundtracks ===
- Resident Evil: Director's Cut Dual Shock Ver. (1998)
- Onimusha: Warlords (2001)
