= Resident Evil: Revelations 2 =

2015 video game

- Developer: Capcom
- Publisher: Capcom
- Director: Yasuhiro Anpo
- Producers: Michiteru Okabe; Masachika Kawata
- Designer: Kazunori Kadoi
- Artist: Satoshi Takamatsu
- Writer: Dai Satō
- Composer: Kota Suzuki
- Series: Resident Evil
- Engine: MT Framework
- Platforms: PlayStation 3; PlayStation 4; Windows; Xbox 360; Xbox One; PlayStation Vita; Nintendo Switch
- Release: Episode 1: PlayStation 3, PlayStation 4; NA: February 24, 2015; WW: February 25, 2015 Windows, Xbox 360, Xbox One; WW: February 25, 2015; Episode 2: PlayStation 3, PlayStation 4; NA: March 3, 2015; WW: March 4, 2015 Windows, Xbox 360, Xbox One; WW: March 4, 2015; Episode 3: PlayStation 3, PlayStation 4; NA: March 10, 2015; WW: March 11, 2015 Windows, Xbox 360, Xbox One; WW: March 11, 2015; Episode 4: PlayStation 3, PlayStation 4; NA: March 17, 2015; WW: March 18, 2015 Windows, Xbox 360, Xbox One; WW: March 18, 2015; Retail version: PlayStation 3, PlayStation 4; NA: March 18, 2015; WW: March 20, 2015 Windows, Xbox 360, Xbox One; WW: March 20, 2015 PlayStation Vita; WW: August 18, 2015; JP: September 17, 2015 Nintendo Switch; WW: November 28, 2017
- Genre: Survival horror
- Modes: Single-player, multiplayer

Resident Evil: Revelations 2 (Note: Known in Japan as Biohazard Revelations 2 (Japanese: バイオハザード リベレーションズ2, Hepburn: Baiohazādo Riberēshonzu Tsū)) is a 2015 episodic survival horror video game developed and published by Capcom as part of the Resident Evil series. The game is a follow-up to Resident Evil: Revelations and Resident Evil 5. It marks the return of Claire Redfield as the protagonist, and for the first time Barry Burton is a playable story character in the main series. It is also the first Resident Evil game to not feature Alyson Court as the long time voice of Claire Redfield. The first episode was released in February 2015.

The plot is set between the events of Resident Evil 5 and 6, in 2011. The story begins when Claire and her co-workers, including Barry Burton's daughter Moira Burton, are at a party in the headquarters of the NGO TerraSave, when they are attacked by unknown assailants and taken away to a deserted island in the Baltic Sea.

The game was released for PlayStation 3, PlayStation 4, Windows, Xbox 360, Xbox One, PlayStation Vita in 2015 and for Nintendo Switch in 2017 along with the port of the first Revelations. The reviews were mixed to positive and the setting, story, characters and the co-op gameplay were praised, but the graphics and some technical issues were criticized. As of December 31, 2025, the title reached 4 million units sold.

== Gameplay ==
Resident Evil: Revelations 2 is set between the events of Resident Evil 5 and Resident Evil 6. Claire Redfield is the main protagonist and Barry Burton's daughter, Moira, plays a supporting role. In December 2014, a new trailer revealed Barry as another playable protagonist and he is joined by Natalia Korda, a little girl with supernatural abilities. The official cinematic trailer was released in December 2014. Resident Evil: Revelations 2 is a survival horror game which supports cooperative gameplay. When played in single player mode, the player must switch characters to solve puzzles and do certain actions. The game has stealth elements as only two of the four playable characters use guns. The other two are more vulnerable, preferring to use melee weapons such as crowbars and bricks; they can also find hidden items with a flashlight or special senses.

The game features a Raid Mode, which returns from the first Revelations game with new features, more missions and new playable characters. About 200 missions and 15 characters are featured, which span the entire game series, and there are also new scenarios and enemies from Resident Evil 5, Resident Evil 6 and Resident Evil: Revelations. In this mode, players can customize their skills and weapons, as well as buy new ones. Some enemies in Raid Mode have special abilities like extra speed or strength. This mode can be played either solo, online or through split-screen local co-op.

== Plot ==
The storyline is composed of four episodes divided into a past scenario with Claire Redfield and Moira Burton and a present scenario with Barry Burton.

Episode 1 - Penal Colony

Claire Redfield and Moira Burton, daughter of Barry Burton, work for biohazard prevention agency TerraSave. While attending an office party, they and several other TerraSave members are captured by armed mercenaries. Claire and Moira are taken to a facility on Sein Island, where they are attacked by the "Afflicted", mutated humans driven insane by torturous experiments. An unknown woman calling herself the "Overseer" watches via cameras and tells them the bracelets on their wrists record fear, as the pair try to find safety. Upon reaching a radio tower, they call for help.

Responding to Moira's distress call, Barry tracks her to the island. He immediately meets Natalia Korda, a strange little girl with the ability to sense monsters before they become a threat. She accompanies him on the way to the radio tower, navigating through hordes of Uroboros-infected mutants. Upon reaching the tower, Barry realizes the distress call was actually made six months ago. After suffering a severe headache, Natalia claims that Moira is dead.

Episode 2 - Contemplation

Claire and Moira meet up with their co-workers, Gabriel Chavez and Pedro Fernandez, at the "Wossek", a derelict pub located in an abandoned fishing village. The Overseer explains that they have become her new test subjects for T-Phobos, a virus that responds to fear, for process of elimination. Gabe leads Claire to a broken helicopter he intends to repair in order to escape the island, but they are soon ambushed by a horde of Afflicted, separating Claire, Moira, and Pedro from Gabe and the helicopter; Pedro succumbs to fear and is transformed into a monster. Claire and Moira fend off both Pedro and the Afflicted until their boss, Neil Fisher, arrives to help them escape. They decide to make their way to the Overseer's tower, but are once again ambushed and Neil stays behind to lure the monsters away. Claire and Moira catch up to Natalia, who has been roaming the island alone, and they befriend her. Gabe fixes the helicopter and attempts to escape, but the Overseer remotely sabotages the controls, killing him. While Claire and Moira are distracted by the crash, Natalia is kidnapped and taken to the Overseer, who intends to transfer her consciousness into the little girl.

Six months later, Natalia takes Barry to the Overseer's tower, the last place she saw Moira alive. Along the way, Barry learns Natalia is an orphan whose parents died in the Terragrigia incident, the trauma having left her immune to fear. Inside the tower, they find a portrait depicting Albert Wesker and a woman who Natalia identifies as Alex Wesker. The two are then ambushed by the Overseer, a grotesque hunchbacked figure who is revealed to be Alex herself.

Episode 3 - Judgment

Claire and Moira follow a note supposedly left by Neil to meet him at a nearby factory, only to walk into a series of traps they narrowly survive. After passing through the sewers, the pair gain access to the Overseer's tower, where they witness a meeting between Neil and Alex Wesker. It is revealed that Neil, a former member of the FBC, was behind his employees' abduction to aid Alex in exchange for a sample of the Uroboros Virus, intending to use it to restore the FBC. Alex injects Neil with Uroboros instead, causing him to mutate into a hulking monstrosity. Claire and Moira are forced to kill him.

Six months later, Barry and Natalia escape from a mutated Alex and work their way from the sewer back to the surface. As they go, Barry tells Natalia about a tragic event concerning his two daughters; Moira accidentally shot her younger sister Polly when they were playing with one of Barry's guns. Although the fault was his, Barry blamed Moira for the accident, causing a huge strain on their relationship. Polly survived, but Moira developed a fear of guns as a result of the incident. Afterwards, Barry and Natalia travel through a dilapidated mine infested with monsters. Alex ambushes them on the other side and throws Barry into a ravine, but when she tries to kill Natalia, the little girl fearlessly stares back into her eyes, causing Alex to withdraw in terror.

Episode 4 - Metamorphosis

After Neil's demise, Claire and Moira make their way up to the Monument to confront Alex, and the duo learn of her intentions to conquer fear and escape death. She shoots herself in the head, triggering a self-destruct sequence that forces Claire and Moira to flee. Unbeknownst to them, Alex experiences fear in her last living moments and begins to mutate. As they descend the crumbling tower, Moira sacrifices herself so that Claire can escape; she is rescued shortly afterwards. She regretfully tells Barry that she could not save Moira, but Barry refuses to accept his daughter's death and continues to search for her.

Six months later, Barry and Natalia pass through several toxic mine tunnels before reaching Alex's research facility, disguised as a mansion. They make their way through as Alex taunts Natalia through the girl's bracelet. When the duo confront her, Alex injects herself with an Uroboros sample and mutates a second time to fight Barry and Natalia. After feigning her own death, Alex suddenly springs to life and incapacitates Barry. She grabs Natalia and once again attempts to kill her. At this point, the story proceeds to one of two endings.

=== Endings ===
In the canon ending, where Moira overcomes her fear of guns by shooting Neil, Moira survives the tower's destruction and arrives in time to save Natalia by temporarily repelling Alex with gunshots. Barry, Moira, and Natalia escape the area before being cornered by Alex. Claire arrives in a helicopter to rescue the trio and they manage to take down Alex with a rocket launcher. As they leave the island, Barry reconciles with Moira and expresses his intention to adopt Natalia into the Burton family.

In an epilogue, Claire is heading towards Barry's home while being informed that her brother is in China, to which she responds, "tell Piers to take care of him." At the Burtons' home, Natalia is surrounded by newspapers covering the events of Resident Evil 6. As she finishes reading Franz Kafka's The Zürau Aphorisms, she smiles ominously, hinting that Alex's consciousness may still reside within her.

In the bad ending, if Claire manages to kill Neil, Moira dies after being crushed by falling debris during the tower's destruction. Alex squeezes Natalia to death, but she re-awakens as Dark Natalia (imbued with Alex's consciousness) and easily destroys her former, mutated body. She then mocks Barry, who cannot bring himself to shoot the little girl he has become attached to. Alex walks away, leaving him in despair.

=== Bonus episodes ===
==== "Little Miss" ====
In this extra episode, set just before Natalia meets Barry, Natalia wakes up in a dream-like state, being greeted by Lottie, her favorite teddy bear. She then goes on a search for Lottie throughout the island infested by "Revenants" and "Glasps". Joining her is "Dark Natalia", a manifestation of Alex's mind whose ability to sense the monsters' presence allows Natalia to sneak past them through a dark, fog-covered atmosphere. They find various postcards from Lottie scattered around and eventually find her near the seashore, but this turns out to be an attempt by Dark Natalia to take over Natalia's body. Dark Natalia tells Natalia that she will eventually be subverted, and Natalia snaps out of her lucid dream as Barry's boat approaches the island.

==== "The Struggle" ====
During the six-month gap between Claire's escape and Barry's arrival, Moira struggles to survive with the aid of an old Russian man named Evgeny Rebic, whom Moira had met once before at an underground sewer control room; Evgeny rescued her before the Overseer's tower collapsed. Despite their contentious relationship, food is very scarce, and the pair have to overcome many dangers together in order to survive. After defeating hordes of mutated monsters, they manage to find a letter from Evgeny's daughter. Upon learning of his daughter's fate, Evgeny loses his will to live and locks himself in his home to succumb to his illness, while encouraging Moira to escape the island without him. A heartbroken Moira ultimately decides to move on, and arrives in time to save her father and Natalia from Alex.

== Development ==
Capcom announced that the team responsible for Resident Evil: Revelations would be responsible for the sequel and a playable version of the game would be seen at Capcom's 2014 Tokyo Game Show booth. It was stated not only would Chris Redfield and Jill Valentine not be part of Revelations 2, but the game would also not be tied to Revelations. However, the Revelations title would be used as its own series of games, existing to fill in gaps in the mythology of the Resident Evil series and expand upon lore for the main title series. During Tokyo Game Show, Michiteru Okabe explained further that the main Resident Evil series will remain more action-oriented, keeping it aimed at a wider audience to try and interest more people in the Resident Evil world. However, Revelations as a series will be fan-driven, intending to revel in the older horror style. With the side series, they hope to aim at their long-time fans and keep them supplied with something similar to the horror experience they fell in love with. During Tokyo Game Show it was announced that Yūdai Yamaguchi, a director and writer known for his mix of horror and "goofy gore" with manga-based inspiration, was brought on to the Revelations 2 team as cutscene director.

Dai Satō, scenario writer for Resident Evil: Revelations, returned for this game. The character of Claire Redfield, who last appeared in Resident Evil – Code: Veronica (2000), was brought back for Revelations 2, due to both fan demand and because Satō was "a big fan of her personally". Claire was written as practical and aggressive to contrast with her partner, the young, immature, and easily scared Moira Burton. According to the producer Michiteru Okabe, they had not reduced the two characters to their gender, and had instead given them unique personalities, which he said reflected positively on the video-game industry's direction at the time. Alyson Court did not return to voice Claire, who was instead portrayed by an unknown woman (credited in-game as James Baker). According to Okabe, the reason for replacing Court was because they felt that her voice was too young for the older and mature Claire and could have caused confusion for players between the voices of Claire and the younger Moira.

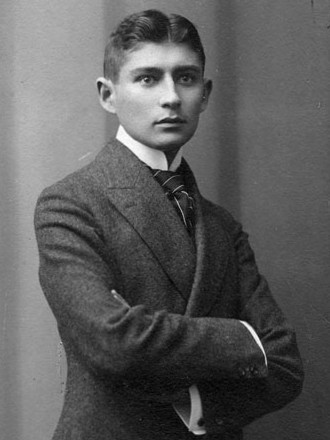
Franz Kafka was a great inspiration for many elements of the plot for Resident Evil: Revelations 2.

The Czech novelist and story writer Franz Kafka was a major inspiration behind the game's plot, the idea influenced by Satō. Since the first Revelations used passages from Dante Alighieri's The Divine Comedy, the team felt that would be a common element for the Revelations series, providing a deeper meaning for the themes explored throughout the story. Furthermore, Satō hoped it would allow players feel more immersed since a real writer became part of the setting. The titles of the game's four episodes are allusions to some of Kafka's works; referring to In the Penal Colony, Contemplation, The Judgment and The Metamorphosis, respectively.

Familiar relationships was a significant theme for the game, approaching more personal elements for the story. Barry Burton's family has a great focus throughout the game's plot; Barry acts as a father figure for Natalia, who became an orphan due to the "Terragrigia Panic" explored in the first Revelations. On the other hand, Claire can be seen as an older sister figure for Moira, who has a strained relationship with her father. The concept of sanity is also of great importance for the setting of the story, as exemplified by the wristbands the characters wear that display their level of fear, some song titles on the soundtrack (Insanity or Despair), and the name of the main enemies of the game, the Afflicted (humans driven crazy by torture and experiments).

Songwriter Kota Suzuki returned as the game's composer after working on other titles of the franchise such as Resident Evil: The Mercenaries 3D, Resident Evil 5, Resident Evil 6, and Resident Evil: Revelations. According to him, for this soundtrack they decided to focus on the "duality of sound". Speaking about the concept of the sound design for Revelations 2 and his collaboration with Nima Fakhrara, he explained: "[Nima Fakhara's] productions possessed that particular element of darkness that worked perfectly with our[s]. After many brainstorming sessions, we decided to use ‘iron’ and ‘water’ as our concepts in creating new instruments. And, after recording, we edited and mixed the sound with other tracks to create a truly unique sound".

=== Release ===
Capcom released the game on February 25, 2015, in a weekly episodic format for PlayStation 3, PlayStation 4, Windows, Xbox 360, and Xbox One. Once the final episode was released, a complete version was launched. Japanese rock band Dir En Grey was featured in some of the material promotion for the game. A full video of the song, Revelation of Mankind, featuring scenes of the band and the game was released in the middle of 2015. That music was also part of their last album, Arche. Sony Computer Entertainment published the PlayStation Vita version of the game. The port was developed by Frima Studio and released on August 18, 2015. The first episode of the game, Penal Colony, was made free to download for PlayStation 4, Xbox 360 and Xbox One on November 18, 2015. After that, a collection was made for the Nintendo Switch containing both Revelations games, which launched at the end of November 2017.

== Reception ==
Aggregate review scores
Game	Metacritic
Resident Evil: Revelations 2	(PS4) 75/100 (PC) 74/100 (XONE) 75/100 (VITA) 65/100 (NS) 73/100
Episode 1: Penal Colony	(PS4) 75/100 (PC) 73/100 (XONE) 73/100
Episode 2: Contemplation	(PS4) 75/100 (PC) 76/100 (XONE) 74/100
Episode 3: Judgment	(PS4) 77/100 (PC) 78/100 (XONE) 73/100
Episode 4: Metamorphosis	(PS4) 75/100 (PC) 73/100 (XONE) 74/100

Reviews for the game have been mixed to positive. There was praise for the setting, story, characters and the co-op gameplay, but the graphics and some technical issues were largely criticized. According to Kimberley Wallace of Game Informer, the game has crazy plot twists, laughable dialogue, and campy moments, all of which come together in a satisfying way. She also praised the characters, as well as their unique story arcs and development throughout the game. The chaotic moments and the boss battles were also well received. On the other hand, Wallace complained about the dated puzzles and backtracking in Barry's campaign, saying that "these places lose their mystery a second time around".

Polygon commented that "Revelations 2 finds a focus that recent entries have sorely lacked", praised the game for including strong female characters, since three of the four main playable characters are female. Kollar was especially fond of newcomer Moira Burton, considering her a memorable and interesting character. However, he criticized the lack of horror, generic level design and the graphics. Destructoid's reviewer, Chris Carter, described the atmosphere of the first episode as well done, praising the creepy bloody dungeons and the dark forests of the island, they also speak well about the action and the fun co-op gameplay.

GamesRadar+ gave the game a score of 4 of 5 and spoke positively about the collaboration and teamwork, saying that both character teams are complementary and make the game a fantastic cooperative experience. However, they found the Claire/Moira campaign to have an unsatisfying ending. IGN considered the game to lack the scares for which the series is famous for, while also criticizing the graphics and considering that the game provides an unmemorable experience. They nevertheless praised the elements of action-adventure, the co-op gameplay, the implementation of traditional puzzles and the interesting plot, which in the words of the reviewer, Lucy O'Brien, "kept me hooked right up until its finale". She also praised the bonus Raid mode.

Many reviewers felt the third episode was the best one. Peter Brown from GameSpot considered the reason for this was the plot development and the presence of interesting puzzles, which were lacking in the first two episodes. IGN also had similar opinions, considering the balance between the action sequences and the puzzle solving to be exquisite.

=== Sales and accolades ===
According to Capcom, due to the variety of manners of selling, Resident Evil: Revelations 2 had a strong beginning and quickly become a million seller for the company. In Japan, in the first week of the release of the complete version, the game reached the second (PS3) and fourth position (PS4), selling 73,373 and 42,358 respectively. The PlayStation 4 hardware that week had a higher-than-normal sales, thanks to the releases of Resident Evil Revelations 2 and Final Fantasy Type-0 HD. In Brazil, the full game version became the 9th best selling game on the PS4 during the month of April 2015. As a download content, the complete season reached the 6th position on the same platform. After that, in the same year, specifically in November, the second episode alone, Contemplation, was the 8th best-selling download content for PlayStation 3. A month later, the PS Vita version reached the 5th position.

As of March 2020, the original release has reached 2.6 million units sold and, with that, Revelations 2 has possibly surpassed its predecessor and became the 26th best seller of the company. Furthermore, in the beginning of 2016, the title was selected by the readers of the Japanese game magazine Famitsu as the 9th most memorable game of the Xbox One.
