= Resident Evil (1996 video game) =

Survival horror game

- International cover art by Bill Sienkiewicz
- Developer: Capcom (Note: Ported to Sega Saturn by Nextech)
- Publishers: Capcom: PlayStation; JP/NA: Capcom; PAL: Virgin Interactive Entertainment Windows; JP: NEC Home Electronics (Note: PowerVR version); JP: Capcom (Note: DirectX version); NA/PAL: Virgin Interactive Entertainment Sega Saturn; JP/NA: Capcom; PAL: Sega Nintendo DS; JP/NA/EU/AU: Capcom
- Director: Shinji Mikami
- Producers: Tokuro Fujiwara; Masayuki Akahori
- Programmer: Yasuhiro Anpo
- Writers: Kenichi Iwao; Yasuyuki Saga
- Composers: Makoto Tomozawa; Akari Kaida; Masami Ueda; Hideaki Utsumi
- Series: Resident Evil
- Platforms: PlayStation; Windows; Sega Saturn; Nintendo DS
- Release: March 22, 1996: PlayStation; JP: March 22, 1996; NA: April 1, 1996; PAL: August 16, 1996 Director's Cut; JP: September 25, 1997; NA: September 30, 1997; PAL: December 10, 1997 Director's Cut Dual Shock Ver.; JP: August 6, 1998; NA: September 14, 1998 Windows; JP: December 6, 1996; NA/PAL: September 17, 1997 Sega Saturn; JP: July 25, 1997; EU: September 11, 1997; NA: October 1, 1997 Nintendo DS; JP: January 19, 2006; NA: February 7, 2006; AU: March 30, 2006; EU: March 31, 2006
- Genre: Survival horror
- Mode: Single-player

Resident Evil (Note: Known in Japan as Bio Hazard (Japanese: バイオ ハザード, Hepburn: Baio Hazādo). The original game spelled the title as two words, instead of the one-word convention used from Biohazard 2 and onward.) is a 1996 survival horror video game developed and published by Capcom for the PlayStation. It is the first main installment in Capcom's Resident Evil series. Set in the fictional Arklay mountain region in the Midwest, players control Chris Redfield and Jill Valentine, members of the elite task force S.T.A.R.S., who must escape a mansion infested with zombies and other monsters.

Resident Evil was conceived by the producer Tokuro Fujiwara, inspired by the limitations on his 1989 horror game Sweet Home. It was directed by Shinji Mikami. It went through several redesigns, first as a Super NES game in 1993, then a fully 3D first-person PlayStation game in 1994 and finally a third-person game. Gameplay consists of action, exploration, puzzle solving and inventory management. Resident Evil established many conventions seen later in the series, and in other survival horror games, including the inventory system, save system, and use of a vitals-monitoring system instead of a health counter.

Resident Evil was praised for its graphics, gameplay, sound, and atmosphere, although it received criticism for its weak dialogue and voice acting. It was an international best-seller, and became the highest-selling PlayStation game at the time. By December 1997, it had sold about 4 million copies worldwide and had grossed more than US$200 million.

Resident Evil is often ranked as one of the greatest and most influential video games ever made. It is credited with defining the survival horror genre and with returning zombies to popular culture, leading to a renewed interest in zombie films by the 2000s. It created a franchise including video games, films, comics, novels, and other merchandise. It has been ported to Sega Saturn, Windows and Nintendo DS. Its sequel, Resident Evil 2 was released in 1998. Both the game's remake and prequel were released on GameCube in 2002.

== Gameplay ==
Chris Redfield in the mansion's art room. With the exception of characters and interactible objects, all environments are pre-rendered.

In Resident Evil, the player chooses to play as either Chris Redfield or Jill Valentine as they explore the Spencer Mansion to find their missing compatriots and secure an escape route. The environment is presented from a third-person perspective, using fixed camera angles and pre-rendered backgrounds, while the player uses tank controls to move. Certain parts of the environment can be examined, items can be collected, heavy objects can be pushed around, and the player can navigate from room to room using doors, stairs, or elevators. Both characters have different perks: Chris has more health and handles heavy weapons more effectively, while Jill has an increased inventory capacity and starts with a lockpick that opens several locked doors which Chris must find keys for.

Chris and Jill begin with only a survival knife and a Beretta M92FS, and zombies and various other monsters scattered around the Mansion will attack them on sight. While the player can procure other firearms to defend themselves, including a Remington Model 870 and a Colt Python, there is limited ammunition throughout the area, preventing the player from killing everything they come across. Taking damage depletes the player's health, shown on an electrocardiogram in the inventory screen – it can be restored using herbs and first aid sprays, but if the player takes too much damage, they will die and must restart from their last save.

The player has a limited inventory capacity of 6 slots as Chris, or 8 as Jill – spare items can be deposited in item boxes found inside various safe rooms, alongside typewriters that let the player use ink ribbons to save their progress. In the inventory screen, items can be examined, equipped, discarded, or combined with each other to produce various effects – e.g. combining two herbs to increase their potency, or making an item needed to progress. Certain items are needed to solve puzzles and either provide the player with more supplies or open new areas.

Each character has a supporting partner that joins them during the story – field medic Rebecca Chambers for Chris, weapons specialist Barry Burton for Jill. Depending on the player's actions, their partner can either die or accompany them throughout the entire game – different endings exist depending on whether the player is able to save their partner and/or the other playable character and escape with them.

== Plot ==
On July 24, 1998, the Bravo Team of the Raccoon City Special Tactics and Rescue Service (S.T.A.R.S.) is sent out into the surrounding Arklay forest to investigate a recent string of cannibalistic murders. When contact with them is lost, Alpha Team is sent out to investigate – consisting of Chris Redfield, Jill Valentine, Barry Burton, Joseph Frost, Brad Vickers, and captain Albert Wesker. They discover Bravo Team's helicopter crashed in the forest, with pilot Kevin Dooley dead at the scene. Alpha Team continue to explore the surrounding forest, but are suddenly attacked by a pack of ravenous Dobermanns. Joseph is mauled to death, while Brad flees in their helicopter – the survivors flee from their pursuers, eventually taking shelter in a mysterious mansion.

One member of Alpha Team (Barry in Chris' story, Chris in Jill's story) is separated and does not make it inside – the player character splits off from the others to investigate noises coming from the west wing, but discover Bravo Team member Kenneth J. Sullivan being eaten by a zombie. When Wesker mysteriously vanishes (alongside Jill in Chris' story), the player is left to explore the mansion alone and attempt to find their allies. As they explore, they find that Bravo Team has been massacred – Forest Speyer was pecked to death by infected crows, while Richard Aiken dies from venom poisoning after being bitten by Yawn, a giant mutated snake, and captain Enrico Marini is shot dead in the torso by an unseen person just after revealing that there is a mole in S.T.A.R.S.. The only Bravo Team survivor, field medic Rebecca Chambers, is rescued by Chris.

The player eventually comes to discover that the mansion was a research facility of Umbrella, a pharmaceutical corporation that was secretly producing Bio Organic Weapons (B.O.W.s) for unknown purposes. The cannibalistic murders were caused by an outbreak of the "Tyrant Virus" (t-Virus for short), a virulent agent capable of turning any species it infects into flesh-eating zombies. At an underground laboratory beneath the mansion, the player discovers that Wesker is the mole, being an employee of Umbrella placed in S.T.A.R.S. to keep an eye on their operations; He also blackmailed Barry into helping him under the threat of Umbrella killing his family, but if Barry survives, he turns on Wesker upon learning that he was bluffing as he betrayed Umbrella for his personal interests.

Wesker releases the prototype Tyrant, a B.O.W. super soldier which he calls the ultimate bio-weapon, in order to demonstrate its potential after the survivors mock it as a failure, but his plan backfires as it kills him first before focusing on the player, who defeats it. Optionally, the player can save the other playable character from a holding cell if they collected a set of MO disks scattered around the mansion, and, if their partner survived (Barry for Jill and Rebecca for Chris), the self-destruct sequence for the mansion will be activated. The player and anyone they saved escape to a helipad where they fire a flare to signal Brad, who is still flying his helicopter looking for them. The survivors are ambushed by the Tyrant, and battle it until Brad drops a rocket launcher for the player to finally destroy it. All remaining survivors of the incident then fly out of the mansion. The ending varies depending on whether the partner survived and/or the supporting character was freed. If the partner did not survive, the self-destruct sequence is not activated and the mansion does not explode, while the Tyrant is now loose in the wilderness. If the supporting character was left in their cell, they are presumed dead. Canonically, all four protagonists (Chris, Jill, Barry, and Rebecca) survive and the mansion is destroyed.

== Development ==
=== Design ===
Resident Evil was created by a team of staff members who would later become part of Capcom Production Studio 4. The inspiration for Resident Evil was the earlier Capcom horror game Sweet Home (1989), itself a video game adaption of the Japanese horror film of the same name. Shinji Mikami was commissioned to make a game set in a haunted mansion like Sweet Home. The project was proposed by Sweet Home creator Tokuro Fujiwara, who was Mikami's mentor and served as the game's producer. Fujiwara said the "basic premise was that I'd be able to do the things that I wasn't able to include" in Sweet Home, "mainly on the graphics front", and that he was "confident that horror games could become a genre in themselves." He entrusted Mikami, who was initially reluctant because he hated "being scared", with the project, because he "understood what's frightening."

Resident Evil adopted many gameplay systems from Sweet Home, including the limited item inventory management, the mansion setting, the puzzles, the emphasis on survival, the door loading screen, the use of scattered notes and diary entries as storytelling mechanics, multiple endings depending on how many characters survive, backtracking to previous locations in order to solve puzzles later on, the use of death animations, individual character items such as a lockpick or lighter, restoring health through items scattered across the mansion, the intricate layout of the mansion, and the brutally horrific imagery.

Part of the inspiration for limited ammunition came from the MSX port of the game Alcazar: The Forgotten Fortress, according to scenario writer Kenichi Iwao. The idea of having limited ammunition was inspired by the limited amount of supplies in the game's randomized dungeons. Iwao wanted to take more elements from the game, such as adding more ways to attack zombies with items such as mines and traps, but was unable to due to schedule constraints.

=== Production ===
Production began in 1993, and the game took three years to develop. During the first six months of development, Mikami worked on the game alone, creating concept sketches, designing characters, and writing over 40 pages of script. The project was originally planned for the Super NES, before moving development to the PlayStation in 1994. Koji Oda was working on the Super NES version, after having worked on Super Ghouls 'n Ghosts (1991). Oda revealed that the setting was originally more of a hellish place, before being changed to a more realistic setting.

Several of the Resident Evil mansion's pre-rendered backdrops were inspired by The Overlook Hotel, the setting for the 1980 horror film, The Shining. Mikami also cited the 1978 film Dawn of the Dead as a negative inspiration for the game. (Note: Mikami refers to the film as Zombie. At the time, two films had been released under that name: a 1978 film directed by George A. Romero, more famously titled Dawn of the Dead, and a 1979 film directed by Lucio Fulci. A later feature in GamePro, the magazine which interviewed Mikami, clarifies that he was referring to Dawn of the Dead and not the Fulci film.) The game was initially conceived as fully 3D and first-person with action and shooting mechanics. A first-person prototype was produced, and initially featured a supernatural, psychological Japanese horror style similar to Sweet Home, before opting for an American zombie horror style influenced by George A. Romero films. During production, Mikami discovered Alone in the Dark (1992), which influenced him to adopt a cinematic fixed-view camera system. Mikami said that, if it was not for Alone in the Dark, Resident Evil would have had a first-person view instead. Mikami was initially reluctant to adopt Alone in the Dark's fixed-view camera system, saying it "had an effect on immersion, making the player feel a bit more detached", but eventually adopted it because the use of pre-rendered backdrops allowed a higher level of detail than his fully 3D first-person view prototype, which "didn't get along so well with the original PlayStation's specs." A concept art claimed to be of the original first-person prototype has been available since the 1990s, showing more similarity to Doom rather than Alone in the Dark. A first-person perspective was not used again for the mainline Resident Evil series until Resident Evil 7: Biohazard (2017).

A later prototype featured cooperative gameplay, but this feature was eventually removed, as Mikami said it "technically...wasn't good enough." Early footage of this co-op prototype was revealed in 1995. At this stage of development, a local co-op mode was present, along with different outfits. A later demo made for the 1995 V Jump Festival presentation in Japan featured real-time weapon changes, with the co-op mode removed and rudimentary character models and textures. An early 1996 preview in Maximum Console magazine featured a graveyard and a slightly different version of the final boss. The graveyard, which was removed from the final game, eventually made it into the 2002 remake. Also featured in the game until late in development were guest houses and a tower, which were replaced by the guard house and the lab respectively. Another feature that was removed from the final game was the real-time weapon changing, from the earlier 1995 V-Jump demo. The co-op mode and real-time weapon changes were not used again for the mainline series until Resident Evil 5 (2009).

Capcom did not use any motion capture in the game, despite having their own motion capture studio; instead, the animators referred to books and videos to study how people, spiders, and other animals encountered in the game move.

In pre-production, other characters were conceived. Dewey, an African-American man, was intended to perform a comic relief role, while Gelzer, a big cyborg, was a typical "strongman" character. Both were later replaced, by Rebecca and Barry, respectively.

Almost all development was done on Silicon Graphics hardware using the software program Softimage. The PlayStation was chosen as the lead platform because the development team felt it was the most appropriate for the game in terms of things such as the amount of polygons. The development team had upwards of 80 people towards the end of the game's development. According to Akio Sakai, head of Capcom's consumer software division, Capcom were hesitant to port Resident Evil to the Saturn because the hardware was not as ideally suited to the game as the PlayStation, ensuring the port would take a long time. A Saturn version was finally unveiled at the April 1997 Tokyo Game Show, at which Capcom also showed a demo for the sequel on PlayStation.

The live action full-motion video sequences were filmed in Japan with a cast of American actors; Charlie Kraslavsky (Chris), Inez Jesionowski (Jill), Greg Smith (Barry), Linda (Rebecca), Eric Pirius (Wesker), and Jason Durkee (Joseph). All Japanese releases contain English voice acting with Japanese captions and text, recorded at a recording studio in Tokyo and provided by Scott McCulloch (Chris, Narrator), Unknown (Jill), Barry Gjerde (Barry), Lynn Harris (Rebecca, Triggering System), Sergio Alarcon (Brad, Joseph), Clay Alarcon (Richard, Zombie Forest Speyer, Zombies), Dean Harrington (Enrico, additional voices), Pablo Kuntz (Wesker, Radio Transmissions), and Ward E. Sexton (Title and Character Names Announcer). Harris was also the voice director for the game, basing her direction on making it camp, loosely on Dawn of the Dead, The Blob and The Rocky Horror Picture Show. However, Japanese voice performances were also recorded but were left unused, as Mikami found the quality of the performances inadequate. However, lead programmer Yasuhiro Anpo later said that, due to all of the development staff being Japanese, they were unaware of the "poor localization" that apparently "hindered the realism and immersion of the title" for the international release, which was one of the reasons for the re-dub in the 2002 remake. The original Japanese PlayStation version also features a vocal ending theme, "Yume de Owarasenai..." (夢で終わらせない..., "I Won't Let This End as a Dream..."), performed by Japanese rock artist Fumitaka Fuchigami, that is not in any other versions of the game.

Fujiwara said the game was originally targeted towards a core audience and he only expected it to sell around 200,000 copies, before the game went on to sell millions. Mikami said he was "a little worried about how well a horror game would really sell." Anpo said that Capcom did not expect the game to be successful.

=== English localization ===
Bio Hazard was renamed for the North American and European markets after Chris Kramer, the director of communications at Capcom, pointed out that it would be impossible to trademark it in the United States. Among others, the 1992 video game Bio-Hazard Battle and the New York alternative metal band Biohazard were already using the name. Capcom ran an internal company contest to find a new name. Resident Evil was chosen since the game takes place in a mansion. Kramer thought the name "was super-cheesy ... but the rest of the marketing crew loved it and were ultimately able to convince Capcom Japan and Mikami-san that the name fit." The cover artwork for the American and European release was created by Bill Sienkiewicz.

The original PlayStation version of Resident Evil went through several changes between its original Japanese release and its international counterparts. The North American and European versions of the intro were heavily cut from the one featured in the Japanese releases. Shots of mangled corpses, a "Cerberus" zombie dog being shot, Joseph's death, and Kenneth's severed head were edited out, as well as scenes featuring the character Chris Redfield smoking a cigarette. Despite these tweaks, the game was ultimately released on the PlayStation as one of the first games to receive the Mature rating from the Entertainment Software Rating Board.

In the game itself, the auto-aiming function was disabled and the numbers of ink ribbons found by the player were reduced. Capcom also planned to eliminate the interconnected nature of item boxes, meaning that items could only be retrieved from the locations where they were originally stored. This change made it in preview copies of the US version, but was removed from the retail release. This particular game mechanic would resurface in the GameCube remake as part of an unlockable difficulty setting. Shinji Mikami noted that they made the American version harder at the request of the American staff so that the game could be rented and not be completed in a few days. Mikami said that this version proved fairly difficult for Capcom staff, who had to play very carefully to complete it.

== Releases ==
Resident Evil was initially released for the PlayStation in Japan on March 22, 1996, in North America on April 1, and in Europe on August 16. It was then reissued and ported to other systems, with many gaining new features in the process.

=== Windows ===
The Windows version, released in December 1996, featured the uncensored footage from the Japanese version, and the opening intro is in full color rather than black and white. It is the only version of Resident Evil that has all of the uncensored full motion video (FMV) sequences, which includes the uncensored introduction, Kenneth's death scene in its entirety, and ending. Support for 3D accelerator cards were added, allowing for much sharper graphics. Two new unlockable weapons were added, a MAC-10 for Jill and an FN Minimi for Chris. New unlockable outfits for Chris and Jill were added as well. It also skips the door animations and allows saves without ink ribbons only in Jill's game.

The original Windows version was re-released on June 26, 2024 by GOG.com to include quality of life improvements and enhanced compatibility. Following the re-release of the first title, GOG.com released Resident Evil 2 on August 27 and Resident Evil 3: Nemesis on September 25, both individually and as a $24.99 bundle. On April 1, 2026, this version was released on Steam, along with the rest of the trilogy.

=== Sega Saturn ===
The Sega Saturn version, released in July 1997, added an unlockable battle mode in which the player must traverse through a series of rooms from the main game and eliminate all enemies within them with the weapons selected by the player. It features two exclusive enemies not in the main game: a zombie version of Wesker and a gold-colored Tyrant. The player's performance in the battle mode is graded at the end. The game's backgrounds were touched up to include more detail in this version. The Japanese version is the most gore-laden of all the platforms; after decapitating a crawling zombie with a kick, the head remains on the floor, and Plant 42 can cut the character in half before the game over screen; though the live-action footage is censored in the U.S. version. The Saturn version also features exclusive enemy monsters, such as a re-skinned breed of Hunters known as Ticks and a second Tyrant prior to the game's final battle in Chris's game. Exclusive outfits for Jill and Chris were added as well.

This version was published in Europe by Sega instead of Capcom's usual European publisher, Virgin Interactive Entertainment.

=== Director's Cut ===
A second version for the PlayStation, Resident Evil: Director's Cut, was released in September 1997. Director's Cut was produced to compensate for the highly publicized delay of the sequel, Resident Evil 2, and was originally bundled with a playable pre-release demo of that game. The Japanese version of the demo disc also included a pre-release demo of Rockman Neo, later retitled Rockman DASH (Mega Man Legends outside Japan), and a trailer for the newly released Breath of Fire III.

The main addition to Director's Cut is an "arranged" version of the game that changes the location of nearly every vital item in the mansion, as well as the enemy placement and camera angles, in addition to adding faster-paced zombies and a reanimated Forest Speyer. The main characters, as well as Rebecca, are given a new wardrobe and the player's handgun is replaced by an improved model where any shot fired has a random chance of decapitating a zombie, killing it instantly. The original version of the game is included as well, along with a new "beginner" mode where the enemies are easier to kill and the amount of ammunition that can be found by the player is doubled. Additionally, the auto-aim function was restored in all modes, though it is not noted in the in-game controls.

The North American and European releases of the Director's Cut were marketed as featuring the original, uncensored footage from the Japanese releases. However, the FMV sequences were still censored, and Capcom claimed the omission was the result of a localization mistake made by the developers. The game's localization was handled by Capcom Japan instead of Capcom USA, and when submitted to Sony Computer Entertainment America (SCEA), it was rejected because of one line of copyright text. Rather than remove the individual line, Capcom Japan decided to save time and simply swap in the cinematics from the U.S. release of the original Resident Evil. SCEA then approved the game and manufactured a full production run without Capcom USA having any idea that the uncensored scenes had been cut. Three days after the game's release, the uncensored intro was offered as a free download from their website. The French and German PAL versions of Director's Cut do feature the uncensored intro FMV in color, though they lacked the uncensored Kenneth death scene.

Director's Cut was included in the lineup for the PlayStation Classic, which was released on December 3, 2018. It was made available on PlayStation 4 and PlayStation 5 on June 13, 2022.

=== Director's Cut Dual Shock Ver. ===
A third version for the PlayStation, Resident Evil: Director's Cut Dual Shock Ver. (デュアルショックver.), co-produced by Keiji Inafune, was released in August 1998. It includes all the features from the previous Director's Cut with support for the DualShock controller's analog controls and vibration functions, as well as a new symphonic soundtrack, replacing the original soundtrack by Makoto Tomozawa, Koichi Hiroki, and Masami Ueda. The symphonic music was credited to composer Mamoru Samuragochi, although he admitted in 2014 that he directed his orchestrator Takashi Niigaki to ghostwrite the new soundtrack. The Japanese Dual Shock Ver. came packaged with a bonus disc that contained downloadable save data, footage of the unused Japanese dubbed versions of the live-action cutscenes, along with brief gameplay footage of the canceled original version of Resident Evil 2.

The soundtrack was generally deemed inferior to the original, with the ambient theme for the mansion's basement considered to be one of the worst video game compositions of all time.

In 1998, Capcom USA released the game under PlayStation's Greatest Hits label.

In North America, Resident Evil: Director's Cut Dual Shock Ver. was released as a downloadable game available from the PlayStation Network soon after it launched in November 2006, although the game is advertised with the original Director's Cut box art. In Japan and Europe, the original Director's Cut was instead made available from the PlayStation Network.

=== Game Boy Color version ===
A Game Boy Color version of the game, developed by the Software House HotGen, was supposed to be released in late 1999 or early 2000, until Capcom decided to cancel this project citing that the port was poor quality due to the Game Boy's limited hardware. This version contains every room, cutscene, and almost all the items that were present in the original PlayStation version.

In January 2012, an anonymous individual claimed to have an EPROM cartridge of the GBC version and requested $2,000 before he was willing to leak the playable ROM. The goal was met in February and the ROM files containing an unfinished build of the game were subsequently leaked. In 2025, a near-complete build of the GBC version was leaked online.

=== Deadly Silence ===
A Nintendo DS port, Resident Evil: Deadly Silence, known in Japan as Biohazard: Deadly Silence (バイオハザード デッドリーサイレンス, Baiohazādo Deddorī Sairensu), was released in January 2006, made to commemorate the tenth anniversary of the series. Deadly Silence includes a "Classic Mode", the original game with minimal enhancements and touch-screen support, and a "Rebirth Mode", containing a greater number of enemies and a series of new puzzles that make use of the platform's capabilities. The character's models are remade with better textures and different clothing, and enemies have higher quality of detail. Although the graphical changes are difficult to notice on the DS' dual screen, they are easier to notice on an HD emulator. Exclusive new outfits for Jill, Chris and Rebecca were added as well. The player's handgun and magnum are replaced with the models from the 2002 remake. The soundtrack prior to Director's Cut Dual Shock Ver. was restored with a remixed track from the game's Original Soundtrack Remix album released in 1996.

The game makes use of the dual screen display with the top screen used to display the map, along with the player's remaining ammunition and health (determined by the color of the background); while the bottom screen displays the main action, and can be switched to show the player's inventory. The DS version also includes updated play mechanics: the 180-degree turn introduced in Resident Evil 3: Nemesis, along with the knife button and tactical reload from Resident Evil 4. The updated controls are applicable to both Classic and Rebirth modes. Just like the PC version, the door animations can be skipped as well as the cut scenes. The live-action footage was still censored, even in the game's Japanese release; however, the scene showing Kenneth's severed head was kept. Gameplay and combat are otherwise uncensored, thus making this the first of 11 DS games to ever be rated Mature 17+ by the ESRB.

In "Rebirth", new puzzles are added that use the system's touch-screen. "Knife Battle" sequences, viewed from a first-person perspective, are also added, in which the player must fend off incoming enemies by swinging the knife via the stylus. One particular puzzle requires the player to resuscitate an injured comrade by blowing into the built-in microphone. The player can also shake off enemies by using the touch screen, performing a melee attack.

The game also includes wireless LAN support for up to four players with two different multiplayer game modes. The first is a cooperative mode in which each player must help each other solve puzzles and escape the mansion together. The other is a competitive mode in which the objective is to get the highest score out of all the players by destroying the most monsters, with the tougher monsters being worth more points. There are three playable multiplayer stages and nine playable characters.

=== Other versions ===
In 2007, Capcom Japan released Biohazard: The Operations, based on the original game for mobile phones. The player controlling Chris/Jill can select scenario or challenge mode, the latter featuring around 100 missions. Objectives vary from killing enemies with limited arsenal to getting to a location within the given time similar to the previous mobile title, Resident Evil: The Missions.

In March 2008, Capcom Interactive Canada released Resident Evil: Genesis, based on the original game. It includes only Jill's game. Genesis was developed from the ground up as a mobile phone title and designed to work more effectively with the limited control scheme and screen size. It uses turn-based movement and grid system combat borrowed from the previous mobile game Resident Evil: Confidential Report. The result is a game that is more of a puzzle adventure game than the survival horror titles found in console versions. The game scored 7.8 out of 10 points on IGN and an 'A' on 1UP.com. A sequel to Genesis, Resident Evil: Uprising based on Resident Evil 2, was released in 2009.

In July 2008, Capcom Japan and Yamasa released PACHI-SLOT biohazard, based on the original game. The characters fate in battle is decided according to the result obtained in a roulette. It also features a bonus mode, where players must defend themselves from enemies sent by Wesker. This version has Jill in her outfit from Resident Evil 3: Nemesis instead of her S.T.A.R.S. uniform. At the end of the 2008 financial year, Capcom reported a "healthy growth" in income from the slot machines, which were released during a downturn in the Pachislot business.

== Reception ==
=== PlayStation ===
PlayStation reviews

Aggregate scores
Aggregator	Score
GameRankings	87%
Metacritic	91/100

Review scores
Publication	Score
AllGame	4.5/5
Computer and Video Games	5/5
Electronic Gaming Monthly	8/10, 9.5/10, 9.5/10, 9/10
Famitsu	9/10, 10/10, 10/10, 9/10
Game Informer	9.25/10
GameFan	97/100, 98/100, 99/100
GameRevolution	A
GameSpot	8.2/10
Hyper	90%
IGN	8.7/10
Next Generation	5/5
Dengeki PlayStation	85/100, 75/100, 70/100, 60/100
Entertainment Weekly	A
Maximum	5/5

Awards
Publication	Award
Electronic Gaming Monthly (Readers' Picks)	Game of the Year (Runner-Up), PlayStation Game of the Year, Adventure Game of the Year (Runner-Up)
Electronic Gaming Monthly (Editors' Choice)	PlayStation Game of the Year (Runner-Up), Adventure Game of the Year (Runner-Up)
5th GameFan Megawards	Game of the Year (Runner-Up)
Electronic Gaming Monthly	Game of the Month
GameFan	Game of the Month
Sony Computer Entertainment (Consumer's Choice)	Best PlayStation Game Overall

The original PlayStation version of Resident Evil was critically acclaimed, receiving an aggregated rating of 91 out of 100 at Metacritic based on eight reviews. Among those who praised the game was GameSpot, describing it as "one of those rare games that's almost as entertaining to watch as it is to play". Famitsu gave it ratings of 9, 10, 10 and 9 out of 10, adding up to 38 out of 40. This made it one of their three highest-rated games of 1996, along with Super Mario 64 (which scored 39/40) and Tekken 2 (which scored 38/40). Resident Evil was also one of only ten games to have received a Famitsu score of 38/40 or above up until 1996. GamePro described the storyline and cinematics as "mostly laughable", but felt the gameplay's "gripping pace" and the heavy challenge of both the combat and the puzzles make the game effectively terrifying. They reassured readers that the unusual control system becomes intuitive with practice and applauded the realism instilled by the graphics and sound effects. The four reviewers of Electronic Gaming Monthly also commented on the realistic graphics and sounds, and additionally praised the selection of two playable characters. Sushi-X remarked that it, "at first glance, may appear to be a clone of Alone in the Dark, but in reality, it is a totally new experience". Mark Lefebvre remarked, "The element that really grabs a player here is fear. After trading blows with the first zombie, you'll quickly become hesitant to turn down any uncharted corridors in the mansion."

A reviewer for Next Generation said it "manages to be as genuinely scary as a good horror film - no small achievement. There are a lot of things that work around games being this frightening ... In this case, however, the fine character work, creepy and well-executed sound effects, and just the right music in just the right places all have a subtle, cumulative effect ..." While criticizing the "laughable" dialogue and voice acting, he felt they were overridden by the game's positive aspects. He pointed out that the lack of genuinely confounding puzzles allows the game to move at a good pace, and the use of prerendered backgrounds allowed the PlayStation to handle much more detailed characters. Yasuhiro Hunter of Maximum stated that "The game has the greatest atmosphere of any other game in existence [sic] - naming a game that makes you jump as much as when encountering your first pair of Cereberos in this title would be very difficult." He also praised the heavy difficulty of the puzzles, the great care required in combat, the 3D graphics, and the exceptionally high replay value.

=== Ports ===
Reception

Aggregate scores
Aggregator	Score		
Aggregator	DS	PC	Saturn
GameRankings	71%	80%	N/A
Metacritic	71/100	N/A	N/A

Review scores
Publication	Score		
Publication	DS	PC	Saturn
1Up.com	B	N/A	N/A
AllGame	N/A	3/5	4.5/5
Computer and Video Games	N/A	N/A	5/5
Electronic Gaming Monthly	N/A	N/A	8/10, 8.5/10, 9/10, 6.5/10
Famitsu	32/40	N/A	8/10, 8/10, 8/10, 8/10
Game Informer	N/A	N/A	9/10
GameFan	N/A	N/A	90/100, 92/100, 80/100
GameRevolution	N/A	A−	N/A
GamesMaster	N/A	N/A	92%
GameSpot	7.9/10	7.2/10	7.3/10
GameSpy	2.5/5	N/A	N/A
IGN	7.0/10	N/A	N/A
Nintendo Power	8.5/10	N/A	N/A
Sega Saturn Magazine	N/A	N/A	94%

Computer Gaming World gave a more mixed review for the Windows version, explaining that they "tried to hate it with its graphic violence, rampant sexism, poor voice acting and use of every horror cliché, however...it's actually fun."

The Saturn version was also very well-received. While most remarked that Capcom had taken too long to bring Resident Evil to the console (the game had been out on the PlayStation for well over a year, and hype had built up for Resident Evil 2, which would be released in just a few months), critics agreed that the game was still as stunning as it had been on its initial release and had been accurately recreated for the Saturn. Computer and Video Games, for example, commented that "With all the talk about the Saturn being inferior in this department, the [graphics] quality cannot be surpassed. All of the rooms, the enemies and the animation are almost identical." GamePro, which gave it identical scores to the PlayStation version (a 4.0 out of 5 for control, and a perfect 5.0 for graphics, sound, and funfactor), summarized that "It would have been nice to have it on the Saturn sooner, but this is as close to a sure thing as you could ask for." Sega Saturn Magazine said that "the intense feeling of terror heightened by the chilling music and eerie silences ... sets Resident Evil apart from any other adventure game you may care to mention." Critics also widely praised the Saturn-exclusive Battle Mode.

=== Director's Cut ===
Director's Cut reviews

Review scores
Publication	Score
Electronic Gaming Monthly	17.5/40
Famitsu	8/10, 8/10, 9/10, 8/10
GameSpot	6.9/10
IGN	8.9/10

The Director's Cut was positively received as well, with most critics regarding the advanced mode and the bundled Resident Evil 2 demo as the highlights. However, all four reviewers for Electronic Gaming Monthly decried it, arguing that a handful of changes and a demo disc were not enough to justify the price.

=== Sales ===
Resident Evil was a best-seller in Japan, North America, and Europe, including the United Kingdom. Shortly after release, it became the best-selling PlayStation game ever at the time. In Japan, the game sold 1.016 million units in 1996 which made if the 4th best-selling game of the year, only trailing Pocket Monsters, Tekken 2 and Super Mario RPG. Overseas, it topped the US charts and entered at number-two on the UK charts. In the United States, the game sold over 1 million copies by early September 1996, becoming a system-seller for the PlayStation and increasing its install base at the time. In Europe, the game shipped 230,000 units on its first day of release, with 21,500 sold on its first weekend in the United Kingdom where it was one of the fastest-selling CD releases up until then. The game went on to sell at least more than 300,000 units in Europe by December 1996.

By December 1997, the game had sold about 4 million units worldwide and grossed more than $200,000,000 (equivalent to $411,000,000 in 2025). According to Capcom's investor relations website, the original version of Resident Evil has sold over 2.75 million copies, while the Director's Cut version (including the Dual Shock edition) sold an additional 2.33 million copies. All PlayStation versions of the game have sold a combined 5.08 million units worldwide.

=== Accolades ===
Resident Evil was the first game to be dubbed a "survival horror", a term that it coined for the genre. It was ranked as the 91st top game of all time by Next Generation in 1996, stating that it "successfully redefine[d] the genre which started with Infogrames' Alone in the Dark." In 1996, GamesMaster rated the game 14th on their "Top 100 Games of All Time". Game Informer referred to the original Resident Evil as "one of the most important games of all-time" in 2007. In 2012, Time named it one of the 100 greatest video games of all time. That same year, the game ranked as one of G4TV's top video games of all time for how it has "launched one of the most successful series in gaming history and provided one of its most memorable scares." Resident Evil was inducted into the World Video Game Hall of Fame in 2024.

In 2004, readers of Retro Gamer voted Resident Evil as the 37th top retro game, with the staff calling it "one of the finest horror-themed games ever" and adding that "full of shocks, surprises and perfectly poor B movie dialogue, Resident Evil is the gaming equivalent of Night of the Living Dead." It entered the Guinness World Records Gamer's Edition 2008 for the "Worst Game Dialogue Ever". Stuff ranked it as the 3rd best PlayStation game of all time.

== Legacy ==
Resident Evil's success resulted in a media franchise that has since branched out into comic books, novels and novelizations, sound dramas, a non-canonical series of live-action films and animated sequels to the games, and a variety of associated merchandise, such as action figures. The series has become Capcom's biggest franchise. The events of the game were retold in Resident Evil: The Umbrella Chronicles, originally released for the Wii in 2007.

=== Cultural impact ===
GameSpot listed Resident Evil as one of the 15 most influential video games of all time. It is credited with defining and popularizing the survival horror genre of games. It is also credited with taking video games in a cinematic direction with its B-movie style cutscenes. Its live-action opening, however, was controversial; it became one of the first action games to receive the "Mature 17+" (M) rating from the Entertainment Software Rating Board (ESRB), despite the opening cutscene being censored in North America. Chicago Tribune said it "revolutionized" gaming in 1997.

Resident Evil is credited with sparking a revival of the zombie genre in popular culture since the late 1990s, leading to a renewed interest in zombie films during the 2000s. Resident Evil also played an important role in the zombie genre's shift from supernatural themes to scientific themes, using science to explain the origins of zombies. In 2013, George A. Romero said it was the video games Resident Evil and The House of the Dead "more than anything else" that popularised zombies in early 21st-century popular culture. A documentary based on his adaptation was released on digital on January 7, 2025. In a 2015 interview with Huffington Post, screenwriter-director Alex Garland credited the original Resident Evil video game as a primary influence on his script for the horror film 28 Days Later (2002), and credited the first Resident Evil game for revitalizing the zombie genre. Shaun of the Dead (2004) star and co-writer Simon Pegg also credits the original Resident Evil game with starting the zombie revival in popular culture. The Walking Dead comic book creator Robert Kirkman named Resident Evil as his favorite zombie game, while The Walking Dead television series director Greg Nicotero credited Resident Evil and The House of the Dead with introducing the zombie genre "to a whole generation of younger people who didn't grow up watching Night of the Living Dead and Dawn of the Dead."

After the original Resident Evil video game sparked a renewed interest in the zombie genre, it was followed by zombie films such as 28 Days Later, Dawn of the Dead (2004), Shaun of the Dead, 28 Weeks Later (2007), Zombieland (2009), Cockneys vs Zombies (2012), and World War Z (2013), as well as zombie-themed graphic novels and television shows such as The Walking Dead and The Returned, and books such as World War Z (2006), Pride and Prejudice and Zombies (2009) and Warm Bodies (2010). The Resident Evil film adaptations also went on to become the highest-grossing film series based on video games, after they grossed more than $1 billion worldwide.

=== Remake ===
In 2002, Resident Evil was remade for the GameCube as part of an exclusivity agreement between Capcom and Nintendo that spanned three new games. The remake includes a variety of new gameplay elements, environments, and story details, as well as improved visuals and sound. The game was also later ported for the Wii in 2008. A remastered version of the remake, featuring high definition graphics, was released as a download for the PlayStation 3, PlayStation 4, Windows, Xbox 360, Xbox One in 2015 then later for Nintendo Switch in 2019, with a limited edition PlayStation 3 version released at retail in Japan.

=== Novelization ===
Resident Evil: The Umbrella Conspiracy is a novelization of the game that was written by S. D. Perry in 1998 as the first book in her series of Resident Evil novels. The novel combines Jill's and Chris scenarios into one narrative and features all five of the main characters (including Barry, Rebecca and Wesker).

The book also takes liberty with some of the original source materials; the most notable difference being the inclusion of an original character named Trent, an insider from the Umbrella Corporation who provides Jill with information about the Spencer Mansion prior to the events of the mansion incident. Since the book was written a few years before the Nintendo GameCube remake, the novelization lacks the presence of Lisa Trevor in the mansion. However, the book does allude to the original version of George Trevor's journal from The True Story Behind Bio Hazard, as well as the short story it contained, "Bio Hazard: The Beginning", which involved the disappearance of Chris Redfield's friend, Billy Rabbitson. Another notable difference in the novels is moving the location of Raccoon City from the Midwest to Pennsylvania, apparently about an hour's drive from New York. Overall, despite having been written before the retcon introduced in the Resident Evil remake and Resident Evil Zero, the book still maintains overall similarity to what the story warped into in the early 2000s.
