= 3 (Tricot album) =

Studio album by Tricot
- Released: May 17, 2017
- Studio: Dutch Mama (Machida, Tokyo); Volta (Nakano, Tokyo)
- Genre: Math rock; avant-rock; indie rock
- Length: 46:00
- Label: Bakuretsu; Big Scary Monsters; Topshelf

Tricot chronology
A N D (2015)	3 (2017)	Black (2020)

Singles from 3
- 1. "Pork Ginger" Released: December 24, 2015; 2. "DeDeDe" Released: March 27, 2017; 3. "Melon Soda" Released: April 21, 2017

3 is the third studio album by Japanese math rock band Tricot. It was released on May 17, 2017, in Japan by the band's own label Bakuretsu Records. The album was released on the same day by Big Scary Monsters Recording Company in the United Kingdom and by Topshelf Records in the United States.

== Critical reception ==
Professional ratings
Review scores
Source	Rating
AllMusic	3.5/5 stars

Patrick St. Michel of The Japan Times wrote that 3 showcases Tricot's "ability to strike a balance between complex instrumentation and sudden emotional flourishes." Phil Witmer of Vice opined that "what makes 3 and the rest of Tricot's music transcend the 'experimental' label is a transparent, pop-derived emotional core", while noting 3 to be the band's "heaviest, most challenging album". Chris DeVille of Stereogum described the album's music as "intricate and noodly" but played with "a frantic energy and melodic directness worthy of the Bangles."

AllMusic critic John D. Buchanan found that Tricot, while not innovative, are nonetheless "very good, and in a crowded marketplace they do manage to bring something unique to the table", citing their ability to "infuse their challenging avant-rock with a real pop sensibility".

== Track listing ==
All tracks are written by Tricot (Motoko Kida, Ikkyu Nakajima and Hiromi Sagane).

No.	Title	Length
1.	"Tokyo Vampire Hotel"	2:31
2.	"Wabi-Sabi"	3:06
3.	"Yosoiki" (よそいき)	3:56
4.	"DeDeDe"	3:28
5.	"Sukima" (スキマ)	5:16
6.	"Pork Side"	1:01
7.	"Pork Ginger" (ポークジンジャー)	4:44
8.	"Echo" (エコー)	3:47
9.	"18, 19"	4:01
10.	"Namu" (南無)	2:46
11.	"Munasawagi"	4:12
12.	"Setsuyakuka" (節約家)	4:28
13.	"Melon Soda" (メロンソーダ)	2:44

== Personnel ==
Credits are adapted from the album's liner notes.

Tricot

- Motoko "Motifour" Kida – guitar, backing vocals
- Ikkyu Nakajima – vocals, guitar
- Hiromi "Hirohiro" Sagane – bass, backing vocals

Additional musicians

- Yuma Abe – drums (track 12)
- Kosuke Wakiyama – drums (track 7)
- Yusuke Yoshida – drums (tracks 1–6, 8–11, 13)

Production

- Masayuki Nakano – recording, mixing
- Akihiro Shiba – mastering

Design

- Hikaru Cho – cover artwork

== Charts ==
Chart (2017)	Peak position
Japanese Albums (Oricon)	20
Japanese Hot Albums (Billboard Japan)	31
US World Albums (Billboard)	5
