= A N D =

Studio album by Tricot
- Released: March 18, 2015
- Studios: Dutch Mama (Machida, Tokyo); Nasoundra Palace (Setagaya, Tokyo); Tuppence House I's (Suginami, Tokyo); Dede Air (Toshima, Tokyo); Volta (Nakano, Tokyo)
- Genre: Math rock
- Length: 47:51
- Label: Bakuretsu

Tricot chronology
T H E (2013)	A N D (2015)	3 (2017)

Singles from A N D
- 1. "Break" Released: August 6, 2014; 2. "E" Released: February 18, 2015

A N D is the second studio album by Japanese math rock band Tricot. It was released on March 18, 2015, by the band's own label Bakuretsu Records. The album was released internationally by Topshelf Records on April 13, 2018.

== Track listing ==
All lyrics are written by Ikkyu Nakajima; all music is composed by Tricot (Nakajima, Motoko Kida and Hiromi Sagane).

No.	Title	Length
1.	"Noradrenaline"	4:03
2.	"Hashire" (走れ)	3:32
3.	"E"	3:38
4.	"Colorless Aquarium" (色の無い水槽)	2:55
5.	"Kobe Number" (神戸ナンバー)	3:42
6.	"Kieru" (消える)	4:35
7.	"Pieeen A N D Ver." (ぱい~ん A N D ver.)	4:13
8.	"Shoku-taku" (食卓)	4:15
9.	"Niwa" (庭)	3:19
10.	"CBG"	3:12
11.	"QFF"	6:55
12.	"Break"	3:32
Total length:		47:51

== Personnel ==
Credits are adapted from the album's liner notes.

Tricot

- Motoko "Motifour" Kida – guitar, backing vocals
- Ikkyu Nakajima – vocals, guitar
- Hiromi "Hirohiro" Sagane – bass, backing vocals

Additional musicians

- Bobo – drums (tracks 3, 7)
- H Zett M – piano and electric piano (tracks 7, 11)
- Toshiki Hata – drums (tracks 1, 4)
- Kazutaka Komaki – drums (track 10)
- Muneomi Senju – drums (tracks 2, 6)
- Kousuke Wakiyama – drums and percussion (tracks 5, 11)
- Miyoko Yamaguchi – drums (tracks 8, 9, 12)

Production

- Hiroshi Ikeda – recording, mixing
- Masayuki Nakano – recording, mixing
- Akihiro Shiba – mastering

Design

- Misato Ishihara – design
- Toshimitsu Koda – photography
- Tetsuro Shima – hair, makeup

== Charts ==
Chart (2015)	Peak position
Japanese Albums (Oricon)	34
Japanese Top Albums Sales (Billboard Japan)	35
Japanese Top Independent Albums and Singles (Billboard Japan)	3
