= Mami Horikoshi =

Japanese voice actress

- Born: Mami Date; Fukushima Prefecture, Japan
- Occupation: Voice actress

Mami Horikoshi (堀越 真己, Horikoshi Mami) is a Japanese voice actress who was previously affiliated with Office Osawa but is now affiliated with Aoni Production. She is originally from Fukushima Prefecture.

== Filmography ==
=== Anime television series ===
- Baki the Grappler – Hanayama's Mother
- Heat Guy J – Yoko Milchan
- Les Misérables: Shōjo Cosette – Okami
- Weiß Kreuz – Manx
- Saiunkoku Monogatari – Eiki Hyou (Sa)

=== Video games ===
- Sonic Adventure 2 – Secretary
- Max Payne – Mona Sax
- Tales of Phantasia (PSP version) – Luce Klaine
- Tales of Rebirth – Rakia
- Tales of the Abyss – Suzanne
- Valkyrie Profile 2: Silmeria – Roussalier

=== CD drama ===
- Itazura na Kiss – Noriko Irie

=== Dubbing ===
==== Live-action ====
- Bill & Ted's Bogus Journey (1994 TV Tokyo edition), Missy (Amy Stock-Poynton)
- Blue Steel (1993 Fuji TV edition), Tracy (Elizabeth Peña)
- Charlie and the Chocolate Factory (2008 NTV edition), Mrs. Gloop (Franziska Troegner)
- Con Air, Sally Bishop (Rachel Ticotin)
- Dragonfly, Miriam Belmont (Kathy Bates)
- ER, Carla Reece (Lisa Nicole Carson)
- First Sunday, Sister Doris (Loretta Devine)
- Gentlemen Broncos, Judith Purvis (Jennifer Coolidge)
- Glitter, Kelly (Ann Magnuson)
- The Godfather Saga, Kay Adams Corleone (Diane Keaton)
- Harry Potter and the Order of the Phoenix, Madam Mafalda Hopkirk (Jessica Hynes)
- Hide and Seek, Allison Callaway (Amy Irving)
- I Feel Pretty, Vivian (Aidy Bryant)
- Life as We Know It, DeeDee (Melissa McCarthy)
- Mortal Engines, Mrs. Wreyland (Megan Edwards)
- Once Upon a Time, Granny (Beverley Elliott)
- Paddington, Aunt Lucy (Imelda Staunton)
- Paddington 2, Aunt Lucy (Imelda Staunton)
- Patti Cake$, Barb (Bridget Everett)
- Peter Rabbit, Mrs. Tiggy-Winkle
- Peter Rabbit 2: The Runaway, Mrs. Tiggy-Winkle
- The Poseidon Adventure, Belle Rosen (Shelley Winters)
- Spy, Susan Cooper (Melissa McCarthy)
- Twin Peaks, Jocelyn "Josie" Packard (Joan Chen)
- Ultraman: The Ultimate Hero, Police Woman/Officer Callahan (Mari Weiss)

==== Animation ====
- The Adventures of Tintin (Bianca Castafiore)
- The Angry Birds Movie (Monica)
- Arthur Christmas (North Pole Computer)
- Cars 2 (Minny)
- My Little Pony: Friendship Is Magic (Mayor Mare)
- Rango (Bonnie)
- Tayo the Little Bus (Poco) (Season 1 onwards)
- The Little Mermaid II: Return to the Sea (Carlotta)
- Turning Red (Ping)
- Wreck-It Ralph (Mary)
