= Tricot (band) =

Japanese math rock band

- Origin: Kyoto, Japan
- Genres: Math rock; indie rock; post-rock
- Works: Tricot discography
- Years active: 2010–present
- Labels: Cutting Edge; 8902; Bakuretsu; Big Scary Monsters; Topshelf
- Members: Ikkyu Nakajima; Motifour Kida; Hiromi Hirohiro; Yusuke Yoshida
- Past members: Kazutaka Komaki; Miyoko Yamaguchi
- Website: tricot-official.jp

Tricot (Japanese: トリコ, Hepburn: toriko; /ˈtriːkoʊ/) is a Japanese rock band from Kyoto. The band was formed in 2010 by vocalist and guitarist Ikumi "Ikkyu" Nakajima, guitarist Motoko "Motifour" Kida, and bassist Hiromi "Hirohiro" Sagane. Known for their intricate rhythms and visual identity, they have released seven studio albums. Their musical style has been described by Rolling Stone as "adrenalized math rock sped up and given pop's candy coating".

== History ==
Tricot was formed in Kyoto in 2010 by vocalist and guitarist Ikumi "Ikkyu" Nakajima, guitarist Motoko "Motifour" Kida, and bassist Hiromi "Hirohiro" Sagane. Sagane is a native of the city, while Nakajima and Kida are from neighboring Shiga Prefecture. Prior to forming Tricot, the three musicians played in various local bands in the Kyoto area, where they became acquainted with one another. Kazutaka Komaki joined the band as drummer in May 2011. Shortly after, Tricot established its own label, Bakuretsu Records.

On October 2, 2013, Tricot released their first full-length studio album T H E, which peaked at number 18 on the Oricon Albums Chart. In March 2014, Komaki left the band due to musical differences. In his absence, the remaining trio opted to tour and record with a rotating cast of musicians. Later that year, Tricot embarked on a tour of five Asian countries, followed by a tour of Europe in which they performed at several music festivals, including the Eden Sessions festival in the United Kingdom, where they supported Pixies.

Tricot's second studio album A N D was released on March 18, 2015 and peaked at number 34 on the Oricon chart. They subsequently staged a tour of North America, Japan, and Europe, titled the Yattokosa Tour, from October 2015 to March 2016. Prior to the tour, they had started auditioning for drummers in July 2015. April 2016 saw the release of their Kabuku EP, which was recorded with the four finalists of the audition, including Yusuke Yoshida.

On May 17, 2017, Tricot issued their third studio album 3, which reached number 20 on the Oricon chart. It was supported by the Tricot vs 47 tour, which saw the band performing in each of Japan's 47 prefectures, and a European tour. At the end of the final concert of the Tricot vs 47 tour, it was announced that Yoshida, who had been touring with Tricot since 2016, had become a full-time member and thus the second official drummer in the band's history. In 2018, Tricot undertook their second tour of North America. The same year, Nakajima formed the band Genie High with comedians Kazutoyo Koyabu and Kukki and musicians Enon Kawatani and Takashi Niigaki.

Tricot released their fourth studio album Black on January 29, 2020, and it reached number 27 on the Oricon chart. Black was the band's first album to be released by 8902, their newly established label under Cutting Edge. To celebrate the tenth anniversary of their formation, Tricot released another new studio album on October 21, 2020 entitled 10, which peaked at number 48 on the Oricon chart.

Jodeki, Tricot's sixth studio album, was released on December 15, 2021, peaking at number 50 on the Oricon chart. It is the band's first double album, consisting of 24 tracks: 12 songs on the first disc, and their instrumental versions on the second disc. Supporting the album, the band toured Japan and Europe in the Walking x Walking Tour. On December 14, 2022, Tricot released their seventh studio album Fudeki. Like Jodeki, it is a 24-track double album with instrumentals of each song on the second disc. Fudeki was preceded by lead single "End Roll", released in February 2022 as the opening theme for the Japanese TV series Liar.

Sagane began maternity leave and a hiatus from touring in May 2024, and Tricot continued to perform live with support bassists. The band released the single "Call" on October 5, 2024, as the opening theme for the anime You Are Ms. Servant. Sagane returned to live performance in April 2025.

== Artistry ==
Despite the band's music containing various elements of math rock, with publications like Rolling Stone describing their "nonstop time-signature shifts" and their "tricky pop" style, and NME explicitly writing of their "frenetic math rock rhythms", Tricot claim to not be familiar with the genre at all. The band assert that their sound is not created purposefully. Bandwagon journalist Elly Lau wrote of Tricot's resistance to conform to genres, citing their song "Potage" which "crafts a distinct sonic palette that can't be boxed in a single category."

The band takes inspiration from a number of styles, from pop to heavy metal. In 2015, Nakajima cited the Red Hot Chili Peppers, Fall Out Boy, and American Football as major influences. In 2021, she additionally cited as influences Ringo Sheena, Morning Musume, and System of a Down. Kida's influences include Number Girl and Acidman.

Talking about their creative process in 2015, the band wrote: "The triggers of our songs are from guitar phrases, which Motifour plays; then we make a cool track before Ikkyu puts vocals on it."

Nakajima is the band's lead songwriter. Her writing style, according to Lau, thematically touches on the metaphysical and "often incorporates surreal imagery and a stream-of-consciousness style."

== Members ==
Current members

- Ikumi "Ikkyu" Nakajima (中嶋郁美) – vocals, rhythm guitar (2010–present)
- Motoko "Motifour" Kida (木田素子) – lead guitar, backing vocals (2010–present)
- Hiromi "Hirohiro" Sagane (相根宏美) – bass guitar, backing vocals (2010–present)
- Yusuke Yoshida (吉田雄介) – drums (2017–present; 2016–2017, touring)

Former members

- Kazutaka Komaki – drums (2011–2014)
- Miyoko Yamaguchi – drums (2015–2016, touring)

== Discography ==
- T H E (2013)
- A N D (2015)
- 3 (2017)
- Black (真っ黒) (2020)
- 10 (2020)
- Jodeki (上出来) (2021)
- Fudeki (不出来) (2022)
