= Mobile games in the Resident Evil series =

Starting with Biohazard i Survivor in 2001, several mobile games based on the Resident Evil survival horror franchise have been released. The games feature different genres and settings, and were developed by the Japanese and Canadian branches of Capcom.

== Resident Evil: The Missions ==
Resident Evil: The Missions
- Developer: Capcom
- Series: Resident Evil
- Platform: Mobile phone
- Release: 2D version: JP: December 1, 2003; 3D version: JP: June 2, 2005; NA: April 19, 2006
- Genre: Survival horror
- Mode: Single-player

Resident Evil: The Missions, known as Biohazard: The Missions in Japan, is a survival horror game developed by Capcom. It is designed to be a series of short challenges which can be completed in a matter of minutes, and does not attempt to provide a new storyline. There is also an enhanced 3D version of the title. In The Missions, players primarily control Jill Valentine, although other characters can be unlocked through continued play. The game recycles prerendered backgrounds from several of the PlayStation era for its backdrops.

The game features 150 different missions. Although some of the missions have the same objective no two missions are exactly alike. Objectives vary from killing enemies in a certain manner, killing enemies with a limited arsenal, getting to a location within the given time or fighting enemies in the dark. There are also several unlockables, such as several new costumes, gallery images, weapons, or extra equipment such as light weight boots that increase movement speed, a laser sight that improves aiming, a customising pack that gives each weapon a unique ability or a side pack that gives the ability to carry two extra normal items. The player controls Jill Valentine. When aiming specifically for an enemy's head or legs a small targeting reticule appears in front of the target and expands and contracts rhythmically. When the aim is as small as possible the chance of hitting the targeted area is greater. At the end of each mission a score is determined by time, kills, damage or a combination of the three along with item usage.

== Resident Evil: Confidential Report ==
Resident Evil: Confidential Report
- Developer: Capcom
- Series: Resident Evil
- Platform: Mobile phones
- Release: JP: January 14, 2004; NA/PAL: 2006
- Genre: Survival horror
- Mode: Single-player

Resident Evil: Confidential Report is a turn-based strategy game series by Capcom originally released in 2004. The series contains four titles (File 1-4). Confidential Report is markedly different from its predecessors. It uses turn-based movement and grid system-based combat. Like Resident Evil 2, each game features two scenarios with two different characters.

=== Plot ===
Rookie cop Tyler Hamilton has been assigned to guard the Umbrella Storage Facility in Raccoon City when an explosion from underground rocks the foundations. Tyler is knocked down, and trapped inside the Storage Facility, however as he wakes up he notices hordes of the undead coming towards him. Meanwhile, FBI Agent, Naomi McClain has been sent into the city to investigate the experiments of this facility, and locate what the previous agent could not; concrete evidence direct from secret FBI informants working within Umbrella's ranks.

After surviving the horrors of the infested Storage Facility, Tyler has been holding up in a local police station. Suddenly, the distress alarm rings from Raccoon University. Governed by his sense of duty, Tyler bravely sets off to the university believing there to be survivors. Unknown to Tyler, Naomi also picks up the distress call, and realises that there is a strong possibility that the alarm was raised by one of the informants she is looking for. She sets off to the university to find more clues to Umbrella and rescue this vital person.

== Resident Evil: Genesis ==
Resident Evil: Genesis is a puzzle adventure game developed by Capcom Interactive Canada released on March 5, 2008. In Genesis, players are taken back to the origins of the Resident Evil franchise, taking the role of Jill Valentine as she investigates the disappearance of the STARS Bravo team and uncovers the secrets hidden in the mansion of Oswell E. Spencer. Genesis was developed from the ground up as a mobile phone title and designed to work more effectively with the limited control scheme and screen size. The result is a game that is more of a puzzle adventure game than the survival horror titles found in console versions. The game scored 7.8 of 10 points on IGN and an 'A' on 1UP.com.

== Resident Evil: Mercenaries Vs. ==
Resident Evil: Mercenaries Vs. is a multiplayer iOS game. It has three characters to choose from: Chris Redfield, Albert Wesker, and Jill Valentine. All characters are present in the attire worn in Resident Evil 5. There are initially three maps to choose from which are entitled, "Dock", "Fort", and "Castle". All these have been taken from Resident Evil 4 and feature many of the Plagas infected Ganado and the chainsaw Ganado. Like many of the new generation mercenaries games, players are encouraged to score as many points as possible by killing B.O.W's. Combo hits can increase the timer for a player in that stage thereby allowing him to score even more points. Mercenaries Vs. supports 2 vs 2 online team match which is free to play for all via Wi-Fi. 1 vs 1 team is Free for all via Bluetooth and Single player Training and Coin Shooter mode. As this is a "Vs" title, players can take out other human controlled AI. Mercenaries Vs. will only run on more up to date versions of Apple's iOS. It will work on iPhone 4, iPhone 3GS, iPad, iPod touch 4th, iPod touch 3rd 16 GB and 32 GB, or better. It is not compatible with the iPhone 3G, iPod touch 1st, 2nd, 3rd 8 GB.

== Resident Evil: Degeneration ==
Resident Evil: Degeneration is the first Resident Evil game to be released based on supplementary material, in addition to being the first on Nokia N Gage 2.0 and iOS. Resident Evil: Degeneration is based on the CGI film of the same name, and incorporates many aspects seen from the film. A more rudimentary first-person version was also released for mobile phones on Java (J2ME) platform.

The Nokia N-Gage and iOS versions use the same 3D engine used in Resident Evil 4 Mobile Edition. Both play similarly, and take place in Harvardville Airport. These versions are divided into 10 small chapters, wherein Leon completes simple objectives and engages in basic combat. Degeneration was a major project and a flagship title for the relaunched N-Gage platform.

== Resident Evil Assault The Nightmare ==
Resident Evil Assault The Nightmare is a cell phone game developed by LivingMobile with a graphical look reminiscent of anime in a first person action shooter. Assault The Nightmare runs as a first person shooter, with players using the arrow keys on their phone to aim the gun in front of them at the oncoming hordes of undead. The graphical design is an anime style. Zombies look very cartoony with thick black outlines, and the civilians resemble anime characters. An emergency at a castle outside a city horrible things are happening and the player is requested to go there.

== Resident Evil ZombieBuster ==
Resident Evil ZombieBuster was a cell phone game developed by Capcom using characters and creatures from the Resident Evil universe. The player can choose between Leon S. Kennedy or Claire Redfield, who are faced with the task of defending a line which zombies try to breach. Other B.O.W.s do make an appearance in this game.

== Resident Evil: Uprising ==
Resident Evil: Uprising is the direct sequel to Resident Evil: Genesis; the alternate take on some of the series most memorable moments. Like Genesis, the game is divided into isometric squares, akin to the Confidential Report series, but this time the setting is the RPD with Resident Evil 2 heroine, Claire Redfield. Looking for her lost brother, Chris Redfield, Claire arrives in Raccoon City to find the city overrun with the undead and other monstrosities. Initially seeking refuge in the R.P.D, Claire and Leon must battle out of the building in order to escape the horrors that lurk in every room.

== Resident Evil Outbreak Survive ==
Resident Evil Outbreak Survive is developed for mobile phones on the Japanese social networking service; FREE. It was officially announced on April 18, 2011. Players take on the role of civilians trapped in Raccoon City struggling for their own survival while working together with friends, sharing healing items and assembling teams of rescuing allies to overcome numerous and difficult missions.

== Resident Evil Survival Unit ==
Resident Evil Survival Unit is a free-to-play real-time strategy mobile game developed by JoyCity Corporation in collaboration with Capcom. The title was announced in July 2025 and was released for iOS and Android platforms on 18 November 2025.

The game is described as a tactical real-time strategy title set in the Resident Evil universe. According to early announcements, it takes place prior to the events of Resident Evil 4 and focuses on squad-based operations involving S.T.A.R.S. operatives in locations near Raccoon City. The game is being designed to incorporate characters and settings from earlier entries in the series.

Resident Evil Survival Unit was launched globally on 18 November 2025, including in Japan, South Korea, North America, Europe, and other regions, following a digital showcase presenting additional information on 10 July 2025. In the weeks after release, specialist gaming media reported that the game surpassed two million downloads within its first ten days and described its debut as a major success on mobile platforms.

As a live-service free-to-play title, Resident Evil Survival Unit features in-app purchases, recurring limited-time events, login bonuses and promotional codes that grant in-game items and resources. Community-run databases and guides compile lists of these promotional codes and provide basic advice for players seeking to progress primarily through a free-to-play approach.
