= Space Griffon VF-9 =

1995 video game

- Developer: Panther Software
- Publishers: Panther Software; Atlus USA (PS)
- Producer: Kenji Satō
- Designer: Reisuke Kanda
- Programmers: Shingo Kozono; Takashi Sasaki
- Artists: Ayabumi Shimamura; Hiroyuki Suzuki; Minoru Komatsubara
- Writer: Kenji Kamio
- Composer: Tetsuya Iizuka
- Platforms: PlayStation, Dreamcast, Microsoft Windows
- Release: PlayStation: JP: 27 January 1995; NA: 25 November 1995; Dreamcast: JP: 3 November 1999; Windows: JP: 8 December 2000
- Genre: First-person shooter
- Mode: Single-player

Space Griffon VF-9 (Note: Japanese: スペース グリフォン VF-9, Hepburn: Supēsu Gurifon VF - 9) is a video game developed by Panther Software for the PlayStation in 1995. An enhanced remake was released on the Dreamcast in 1999.

== Gameplay ==
The player controls James "Jim" Billington (Codename: "Kid"), a mech pilot who is investigating a space colony on the Moon where something has gone wrong.

The game has typical mech game elements such as equipping items and character inventories. If Kid's life reaches zero, the game is over.

== Plot ==
=== Setting ===
On October 17, 2148, Earth loses communications with the Moon's largest man made structure called HAMLET, a highly classified facility owned by conglomerate A-MAX Factories containing arms development, mining, exports and laboratory research for the military. A-MAX sends in their own private military arm A-MAX Cleaners (AMC) to investigate the cause behind the incident.

=== Characters ===
Piloting VF mechs, the AMC team consists of Konrad Von Eibol (“Boss”), captain of the squad; Oreag Arnderson (“Killer”), the team's tough guy; Maria Hansfield (“Stormy”), a moody and quick tempered woman; Rauzein Shizevinov (“Bighorn”), a skilled mechanic and information backer; Mark Smiley (“Thief”), whose prized possession is a popular good luck charm called Lunar Tears; and James “Jim” Billington (“Kid”), the newest member of the team piloting the VF-9 Griffon which the player controls.

=== Story ===
Upon the team's arrival at HAMLET, they encounter no signs of life other than hostile guard robots, auto-noids and bio-organisms, including a large and intelligent bio-monster that frequently eludes them. A data disk containing a researcher's diary explains that a viral outbreak of research ordered by A-MAX caused infected individuals to attack non-infected ones, killing most of the residents including lead researcher Professor Mabel, who was absorbed by an organism. The virus also has the ability to reanimate the dead into zombies.

While the team explores the mines where Lunar Tears are extracted, Jim locates a crazed Smiley whose mind is now infected by the virus. When the bio-monster attacks, Oreag sacrifices himself by detonating his VF to defeat the creature; Smiley is caught in the blast. Jim and Konrad discover Francis Lakewood, a surviving researcher that is taken to medical to recover. Near Mabel's laboratory, Jim discovers a cryogenic sleep facility where he thaws out a young girl named Mary, the sister of Francis whom Mary warns not to trust. Francis's motives are later revealed: she intends to spread the virus to Earth in an act of revenge on A-MAX for confining the scientists to the facility to work on the virus.

Konrad, Maria and Jim ambush the bio-monster in a cross-fire, but Konrad is cornered and forfeits his life by ordering Jim and Maria to open fire and kill the creature. During Francis's interrogation, she recognizes Jim and Maria’s recent symptoms as signs of early infection. She notes that possession of Lunar Tears accelerates the process (explaining Smiley's rapid infection), which would be dire for an outbreak on Earth as Lunar Tears are a popular fad there. Convinced of the error of her ways, Francis agrees to help the team contain the outbreak and provides a vaccine that treats Jim and Maria’s infection.

Sensors discover that the bio-monster is still alive and evolves into a stronger form following a mitosis state; Francis explains that the organism assimilated with Mabel and assumed his identity and will to destroy Earth. Francis is critically injured while administering a weaponized vaccine to defeat the bio-monster / Mabel organism; Maria sedates her and places her into the cargo hold for transportation back to Earth. Still persisting, Mabel then sends a zombified Oreag and Smiley to attack Jim; the former is defeated by Jim while the latter is eliminated by Maria who dies in the confrontation.

Discovering that Mabel's weakness is fire, Jim and Rauzein plant a series of bombs on oxygen supply pipes to lure it into a trap. Rauzein shuts himself in with Mabel to take out the creature, ordering Jim and Mary to return to Earth without him. When Mary stops by her room before leaving, Rauzein breaks the wall down and reveals himself to be an android under control of AMC official Brigadier Lukesonoff. Brigadier orders Rauzein to wipe out all remaining survivors to conceal knowledge of A-MAX's activities within the facility; Jim disables Rauzein with his firearm and returns to the shuttle where Francis is resting.

Mabel reappears aboard a VF and attacks; Mary preps the shuttle for takeoff as Jim battles the bio-monster. Rauzein arrives and blows open Mabel's cockpit, leaving the organism vulnerable for a final defeat. Having regained control of his senses, Rauzein reveals he was aware of Brigadier's final programming all along and intended to die with the monster before his order could be executed against his will. Triggering the station for detonation to prevent further incident, Rauzein remains behind as Jim, Mary and Francis escape in the shuttle. As a commercial for Lunar Tears airs on the monitor in the cockpit, remains from the bio-monster are shown affixed to the VF Griffon, pulsating as the shuttle descends towards Earth.

== Releases ==
Space Griffin VF-9 was released in a long box case and was localized in North America with both English vocals and English voice acting, but the vocals were cut before release, leaving a purely instrumental soundtrack. The Dreamcast version was a graphically enhanced remake which featured a heavier anime style and newly animated cutscenes; this version was released only in Japan.

== Reception ==
Reception

Review scores
Publication	Score	
Publication	Dreamcast	PS
Consoles +	N/A	91%
Famitsu	25/40	N/A
Game Informer	N/A	7.75/10
GameFan	N/A	238/300
IGN	4.0/10	2.0/10
Next Generation	N/A	2/5
Video Games (DE)	N/A	54%
Dengeki PlayStation	N/A	65/100, 80/100, 80/100, 70/100
Dreamcast Magazine (JP)	6.0/10	N/A
VideoGames	N/A	6/10

Space Griffon VF-9. Readers of the Japanese Dreamcast Magazine voted to give the Dreamcast remake a 6.7209 out of 10 score, ranking at the number 350 spot, indicating a middling following. Consoles +' François Garnier and Marc Menier reviewed the PlayStation original, praising the fast and fluid visuals, sound effects, and overall longevity compared to Kileak: The Blood. However, both Garnier and Menier noted that the player must get used to the game's combat management, while they also felt the music was not varied enough and expressed disappointment with its presentation. GameFan's three writers reviewed the PlayStation release, commending its intriguing storyline, roleplaying-esque action gameplay, 3D graphics, the ability to transform on the fly, and English translation. Nevertheless, they noted the lack of in-game music and found its monocromatic environments repetitive. VideoGames magazine also analyzed the PlayStation version, comparing the game with both Kileak and Robotica (1995), finding the visuals to be crisp but bland and its movement average. Next Generation reviewed the PlayStation original as well, calling it "A nice idea. Badly done."

Video Games' Jan Schweinitz gave mixed thoughts when reviewing the PlayStation original regarding its visuals and gameplay, but negatively noted the lack of music during gameplay. In their brief review of the PlayStation release, GamePro stated that "Respectable graphics and sounds fashion convincing sci-fi environments, and your cool mech suit fights viciously. Space Griffon's addictive, intriguing combination of mech combat and strategic exploration isn't for everyone, though." Reviewing the PlayStation version, IGN compared the game unfavorably with Doom, criticizing its slow action. Writing for IGN, Colin Williamson reviewed the Dreamcast remake and was critical of its underwhelming plot, monotonous level design and thick fog covering the areas.
