= Beverly Hills Chihuahua (film series) =

- Directed by: Raja Gosnell; Alex Zamm; Lev L. Spiro
- Starring: George Lopez; Drew Barrymore; Bella Stine; Erick Reyes; Kyla Pelletier; Heidi Klum
- Production company: Walt Disney Pictures
- Distributed by: Walt Disney Studios Motion Pictures
- Release dates: 2008 (1); 2011 (2); 2012 (3)
- Running time: 264 minutes
- Countries: United States; Mexico
- Languages: English; Spanish
- Box office: Total (3 films): $176,275,867 ^{(DVD sales)}

Beverly Hills Chihuahua is a Mexican-American film trilogy. The films are based on a chihuahua named "Papi” going through adventures alongside his family and friends.

== Films ==
Occupation	Films		
Occupation	Beverly Hills Chihuahua	Beverly Hills Chihuahua 2	Beverly Hills Chihuahua 3: Viva la Fiesta!
Occupation	2008	2011	2012
Director	Raja Gosnell	Alex Zamm	Lev L. Spiro
Producer(s)	David Hoberman; Todd Lieberman; John Jacobs; Ricardo Del Río	Brad Krevoy	Sara E. White
Writer(s)	Screenplay by: Annalise LaBianco; Jeff Bushell; Story by: Jeff Bushell	Dannah Feinglass; Danielle Schneider	Dana Starfield
Composer	Heitor Pereira	Chris Hajiam	Heitor Pereira
Cinematography	Phil Meheux	Robert Brinkmann	Greg Gardiner
Editor(s)	Sabrina Plisco	Marshall Harvey; Heath Ryan	Matthew Colonna
Production company	Walt Disney Pictures; Mandeville Films	Walt Disney Pictures	Walt Disney Pictures
Distribution	Walt Disney Studios Motion Pictures	Walt Disney Studios Home Entertainment	Walt Disney Studios Home Entertainment
Runtime	91 minutes	84 minutes	89 minutes
Release date	October 3, 2008	February 1, 2011	September 18, 2012

=== Beverly Hills Chihuahua (2008) ===
Vivian Ashe (Jamie Lee Curtis) leaves her pet chihuahua Chloe, (Drew Barrymore) with her irresponsible niece Rachel (Piper Perabo). However, when Rachel decides to go to Mexico with her friends, Chloe gets dognapped. She is sent to the dog fights and meets a German Shepherd named Delgado (Andy Garcia) who helps her escape the dog fights and attempts to get her back to Beverly Hills. Meanwhile, Rachel is searching for Chloe with Sam (Manolo Cardona) and Papi (George Lopez), landscaper and dog before Aunt Viv gets home.

When Delgado was talking to his friend from when he was in the Mexican Police, Chloe encounters a pack rat named Manuel (Cheech Marin) trying to steal her diamond collar. She is tricked into giving it to him, which was going to be used to get her home. When Delgado and Chloe was smuggled by a Coyote in a train, Delgado created a diversion to so that Chloe would not get caught by the train crew. After jumping off the train, they walked across the Chihuahua Desert, Delgado told Chloe how he lost his sense of smell, when Delgado and his partner were searching for a suspect, he was ambushed by El Diablo and his owner. When he woke up his partner was seriously wounded and was never the same after that night. Neither was Delgado because the next morning, he completely lost his sense of smell. El Diablo (Edward James Olmos), a fierce Doberman Pinscher, is sent by the dog fight ringleader to capture Chloe for the reward.

Later on, Manuel is seen with the collar by Delgado, so Manuel switches side and helps Delgado find his sense of smell. Delgado sniffs the collar and gets his sense of smell back. He finds Chloe and she returns to Beverly Hills. Delgado gets a job with the police, and El Diablo runs away. Chloe and Papi go on a date by the gazebo, and Chloe licks him on the face. Papi mentions that there might be a few miniature baby Chihuahuas in their futures, the two stray dogs that Sam and Rachel adopt on the trail of Chloe go to good homes too, El Diablo is adopted by a lady who has a passion for fashion, and Sam and Rachel start dating.

=== Beverly Hills Chihuahua 2 (2011) ===
Two years after the events of the first film, newly married couple Papi (voiced by George Lopez) and Chloe (voiced by Odette Yustman) are trying to keep up with their five puppies Papi Jr, Lala, Rosa, Ali and Pep (voiced by Zachary Gordon, Madison Pettis, Chantilly Spalan, Delaney Jones and Emily Osment) running around the house, creating problem after problem. However, Papi shows a soft side for the pups and occasionally tells them of their ancient ancestors, the Chihuahua Warriors. Aunt Viv (Susan Blakely), Chloe's owner, is in the rain forest for the next 6 months with her niece, Rachel (Erin Cahill) searching for plants for medical research. During this time Sam (Marcus Coloma), Papi's owner and Rachel's boyfriend, is caring for the whole chihuahua family. Sam takes Chloe, Papi and the puppies back home to meet his parents, Mr. and Mrs. Cortez (Castulo Guerra and Lupe Ontiveros).

Sam finds out that his parents are struggling to pay the mortgage on their house and the bank plans to take their home and sell it. Chloe and the rest of the dogs decide to compete in a dog show in order to win a large cash prize. Delgado, an old friend, also comes to the home and tells Chloe that he needs her help with a secret mission. The mission turns out to be Delgado trying to tell his two sons the truth about why he left them as puppies, but he cannot bring himself to do it. Later, Papi initially wins the dog show, but is later disqualified due to lack of breed papers, losing to an arrogant and vain French poodle named Appoline (Bridgit Mendler). After hearing that Delgado has sons in Los Angeles, the puppies set off to find them. In trying to help, the puppies get caught up in a bank robbery.

Meanwhile, Chloe, Papi, Pedro (Papi's adoptive brother) and Delgado are trying to find the puppies when they appear running across the television screen at the site of the bank robbery. They run to the bank to begin searching for the puppies. The puppies happen to crawl into the crooks' duffel bags and end up at Hoffman's Bread Factory. Pedro finds a mask with the scent of bread on it which leads them to the factory. They foil the robbery, then return home to find that they have been awarded more than enough money to save their house and Rachel and Aunt Viv have returned. Delgado also goes back into the police force with his two sons, that now found out the truth on why Delgado left them as pups. Rachel accepts Sam's marriage proposal, and the family celebrates.

=== Beverly Hills Chihuahua 3: Viva la Fiesta! (2012) ===
After their wedding, Rachel and Sam decide to find new jobs. The Langham Hotel is willing to let anybody who can take the place of the landscaper and chef live in the hotel. Sam and Rachel bring Chloe and Papi to the hotel, where Chloe and Papi meet Oscar and Jenny, the hotel's Doggy Day School teachers. Papi is less than thrilled when he discovers he will no longer be teaching the pups. Mr. Hollis, the manager, notices Chloe and asks if she can make appearances as the hotel has gained a major threat, Montague, the owner of the new hotel to rival the Langham. Because of this Sam and Rachel get the jobs. Rosa is also not much happier at the thought of Doggy Day School. Pedro also comes along to the Langham decked out in sunnies. The humans, chihuahuas and Pedro are blown away at their room's luxury. However, Rosa isn't feeling happy and is nervous about day school. Papi comforts her, telling her about how he was a chamberlain at a friend's Quinceanera when Pedro finds a picture in a box marked "DO NOT OPEN". Papi tells her what a Quinceanera is about. Later, Chloe, Sam and Rachel start work, and the puppies go to school.

Rachel meets her boss, Chef Didier, an uptight man who is very fond of himself. When somebody quits, Chef says that he fired him. When he and Rachel meet, he tells her to wash dishes and then throws herbs at her face. Sam meets his assistant, Lester, who is lazy and tired and leaves Sam to do all the work. Rosa is being bullied by a large dog who teases her for having to wear swimmies. Rosa runs off, upset and embarrassed and the puppies get payback on the dog. Papi finds Sam and offers assistance, but just as he begins to help, he hears a rustling sound and finds an overgrown and messy garden. There, he meets Arnie, a stray dog. Oscar then arrives as Jenny quickly leaves, not wanting to be seen or heard. Papi is concerned for the pups' safety and asks Oscar what is going on. Oscar, however, doesn't want to mention anything and leaves Papi to ponder what is going on. Arnie makes a carving of Jenny to warn Papi, but Papi doesn't understand it.

Back at home, Rosa fakes being sick to avoid going to school but when Papi says she will have to go to the vet, she claims she is feeling better. She claims that she does not want to be little anymore and states she wants to be a Quince. When the other pups assume it is "One of dad's weird Mexican holidays", they state they want a sweet sixteen, but Rosa says she wants a Quince and Papi promises to throw her one. The next day, an old friend, Sebastian, arrives and helps with the party planning. But in the midst of the party planning, Papi continues to be his paranoid self and was pressured due to the lot of errands he has been working on. As more proof of Jenny and Oscar scheming something behind their backs, and Rosa saving a dog, Charlotte, who was a VIP guest at the hotel, they contact Delgado, to help with their plan on catching Jenny and preparing Rosa's quince.

The next day, Papi, Pedro and Arnie are together, with Pedro keeping watch. Jenny appears, telling Oscar to be quiet. She trips and falls into a pit of peanut butter, and Pedro calls the other dogs, saying that there is free peanut butter in the south garden. The manager of the hotel hears the commotion. Papi tells Pedro to open the gate, and Delgado appears with the rival hotel manager, Montague, hung upside down. A bewildered Chloe comes and apologizes to Papi. After a while, Chloe and Papi wake up Rosa with quince outfits for her and her siblings and get ready. As the quince starts, Ali reveals that she was the one who mentioned Charlotte's rescue to the other pups. Jenny and Oscar are arrested and Papi becomes the new teacher at the doggy day care. The manager takes in Arnie.

== Cast and characters ==
List indicators

This section includes characters who will appear or have appeared in the film series.

- An empty grey cell indicates the character was not in the film, or that the character's official presence has not yet been confirmed.
- ^{U} indicates an uncredited appearance.

Character	Films		
Character	Beverly Hills Chihuahua	Beverly Hills Chihuahua 2	Beverly Hills Chihuahua 3: Viva la Fiesta!
Character	2008	2011	2012
Papi	George Lopez	George Lopez	George Lopez
Chloe	Drew Barrymore	Odette Yustman	Odette Yustman
Delgado	Andy Garcia	Miguel Ferrer	Miguel Ferrer
Sam	Manolo Cardona	Marcus Coloma	Marcus Coloma
Rachael	Piper Perabo	Erin Cahill	Erin Cahill
Sebastian	Michael Urie	Tom Kenny	Tom Kenny
Delta	Loretta Devine	Loretta Devine	
Biminy	Leslie Mann^{U}	Alyssa Milano	
Aunt Viv	Jamie Lee Curtis	Susan Blakely	
Pedro		Ernie Hudson	Ernie Hudson
Papi Jr.		Zachary Gordon	Logan Grove
Pep		Emily Osment	Emily Osment
Lala		Madison Pettis	Madison Pettis
Rosa		Chantilly Spalan	Kay Panabaker
Ali		Delaney Jones	Delaney Jones
Marie Appoline Bouvier		Bridgit Mendler	

== Animation ==
=== Direct-to-video-short ===
An animated short titled Legend of the Chihuahua (2009) was released as a bonus feature with the first film on DVD.

=== Scrapped animated series ===
In the early 2010s, an animated Beverly Hills Chihuahua series was in the works. The series was developed by Tad Stones and Bento Box Entertainment and would have aired on Disney Junior. However, the series fell through and only made it to the pilot stage.
