= Beverly Hills Chihuahua 2 =

- DVD cover
- Directed by: Alex Zamm
- Written by: Dannah Feinglass; Danielle Schneider
- Based on: Characters by Jeff Bushell
- Produced by: David Hoberman; Brad Krevoy
- Starring: Odette Annable; George Lopez; Zachary Gordon; Emily Osment; Marcus Coloma; Erin Cahill; Bridgit Mendler; Tom Kenny; Miguel Ferrer; Ernie Hudson
- Cinematography: Robert Brinkmann
- Edited by: Marshall Harvey; Heath Ryan
- Music by: Chris Hajian
- Production companies: Walt Disney Pictures; MPCA Productions
- Distributed by: Walt Disney Studios; Home Entertainment
- Release date: February 1, 2011
- Running time: 84 minutes
- Countries: United States; Mexico
- Language: English
- Box office: $29.8 million (DVD sales)

Beverly Hills Chihuahua 2 is a 2011 American comedy film. It is the sequel to 2008's Beverly Hills Chihuahua and the second film in the Beverly Hills Chihuahua series. Directed by Alex Zamm, and starring George Lopez, Odette Annable and Zachary Gordon, the film focuses on Papi and Chloe, now married with five puppies. The film was released by Walt Disney Studios Home Entertainment on February 1, 2011, in a two-disc Blu-ray and DVD combo pack. With the exception of Lopez and Loretta Devine, none of the actors from the first film reprised their roles.

Another sequel, Beverly Hills Chihuahua 3: Viva la Fiesta!, was released on September 18, 2012.

== Plot ==
Two years after the events of the first film, newly married couple Papi and Chloe are trying to keep up 4 months later with their five puppies Papi Jr, Lala, Rosa, Ali and Pep running around the house, creating problem after problem. However, Papi shows a soft side for the pups and occasionally tells them of their ancient ancestors, the Chihuahua Warriors. Aunt Viv, Chloe's owner, is in the rain forest for the next 6 months with her niece, Rachel searching for plants for medical research. During this time Sam, Papi's owner and Rachel's boyfriend, is caring for the whole chihuahua family. Sam takes Chloe, Papi and the puppies back home to meet his parents, Mr. and Mrs. Cortez.

Sam finds out that his parents are struggling to pay their mortgage and the bank plans to foreclose and sell their home. Chloe and the rest of the dogs decide to compete in a dog show in order to win a large cash prize. Delgado, an old friend, also comes to the home and tells Chloe that he needs her help with a secret mission. The mission turns out to be Delgado trying to tell his two sons the truth about why he left them as puppies, but he cannot bring himself to do it. Later, Papi initially wins the dog show, but is later disqualified due to a lack of breeding certification, losing to an arrogant and vain French poodle named Appoline. After hearing that Delgado has sons in Los Angeles, the puppies set off to find them. In trying to help, the puppies get caught up in a bank robbery.

Meanwhile, Chloe, Papi, Pedro (Papi's adoptive brother) and Delgado are trying to find the puppies when they appear running across the television screen at the site of the bank robbery. They run to the bank to begin searching for the puppies. The puppies happen to crawl into the crooks' duffel bags and end up at the Hoffman Bread Factory. Pedro finds a mask with the scent of bread on it which leads them to the factory. They foil the robbery, then return home to find that they have been awarded more than enough money to save their house and that Rachel and Aunt Viv have returned. Delgado also goes back into the police force with his two sons, now that they found out the truth on why Delgado left them as puppies. Rachel accepts Sam's marriage proposal and the family celebrates.

== Cast ==
- Odette Annable as Chloe Winthrop Ashe-Cortez, Papi's wife; Annable replaces Drew Barrymore from the first film.
- George Lopez as Papi Cortez
- Phill Lewis as Mr. McKibble
- Marcus Coloma as Sam Cortez; Coloma replaces Manolo Cardona from the first film.
- Erin Cahill as Rachel Ashe; Cahill replaces Piper Perabo from the first film.
- Ernie Hudson as Pedro Cortez
- Miguel Ferrer as Officer Delgado; Ferrer replaces Andy García from the first film, Antonio and Alberto's Father.
- Zachary Gordon as Papi Cortez Jr.
- Chantilly Spalan as Rosa Cortez
- Emily Osment as Pep Cortez
- Madison Pettis as Lala Cortez
- Delaney Jones as Ali Cortez
- Susan Blakely as Vivian 'Viv' Ashe; Blakely replaces Jamie Lee Curtis from the first film.
- Lupe Ontiveros as Mrs. Cortez (Ontiveros' last film role)
- Castulo Guerra as Mr. Cortez
- Tom Kenny as Sebastian; Kenny replaces Michael Urie from the first film.
- Loretta Devine as Delta
- Jon Donahue as Antonio, Delgado's older son
- Jon Huertas as Alberto, Delgado's younger son
- Bridgit Mendler as Marie Appoline Bouvier
- Alyssa Milano as Biminy; Milano replaces Leslie Mann from the first film.
- Elaine Hendrix as Colleen Bouvier (Appoline's owner)
- Brian Stepanek as the Banker
- Morgan Fairchild as Beverly Hills Dog Show Commentator/Dog Show Judge #1
- French Stewart as Beverly Hills Dog Show Commentator/Dog Show Judge #2

== Music ==
=== This Is My Paradise ===
"This Is My Paradise"

Promotional single by Bridgit Mendler
- Released: January 12, 2011
- Genre: Pop
- Length: 3:45
- Label: Walt Disney
- Songwriter: Bridgit Mendler
- Producer: Chen Neeman

"This is My Paradise" is a song performed by American pop recording artist Bridgit Mendler. The song was created by Mendler and produced by Chen Neeman. It was released as a promotional single on January 11, 2011.

==== Critical reception ====
Sweets Lyrics commented that the song is about summer and the beach, despite it being winter in the United States when it was released. Disney Dreaming said the song was light and fun.

==== Track listing ====
- U.S. digital download
1. "This Is My Paradise" – 3:19

==== Music video ====
The video of the song was recorded in Beverly Hills, California in November 2010 and directed by Alex Zamm. The video was released on December 19 by Disney Channel, and on YouTube one day later. The video begins with Mendler traveling in an old red and white kombi, leaving Beverly Hills and going to Baja California, Mexico. She sings and writes on the road. After finding her friends, Mendler walks on the beach and plays guitar. They camp by the sun.

==== Chart performance ====
Chart (2012)	Peak position
US Kid Digital Songs (Billboard)	1
