= Biohazard 4 =

Biohazard 4 may refer to:

- Resident Evil 4, 2005 video game
  - Resident Evil 4 (2023 video game), remake of the 2005 video game
- Resident Evil: Afterlife, the fourth live-action film in the Resident Evil series, released in 2010.
- Resident Evil: Death Island, the fourth CG film in the Resident Evil series, releasing in 2023
- Biohazard level 4, category to distinguish the severity of biological agents
