= Beverly Hills Chihuahua =

2008 American family comedy film

- Theatrical release poster
- Directed by: Raja Gosnell
- Screenplay by: Analisa LaBianco; Jeff Bushell
- Story by: Jeff Bushell
- Produced by: David Hoberman; Todd Lieberman; John Jacobs; Ricardo Del Río
- Starring: Drew Barrymore; George Lopez; Edward James Olmos; Piper Perabo; Manolo Cardona; Jamie Lee Curtis; Andy García; Luis Guzmán
- Cinematography: Phil Méheux
- Edited by: Sabrina Plisco
- Music by: Heitor Pereira
- Production companies: Walt Disney Pictures; Mandeville Films; Smart Entertainment
- Distributed by: Walt Disney Studios; Motion Pictures
- Release dates: September 18, 2008 (El Capitan Theatre); October 3, 2008 (United States)
- Running time: 91 minutes
- Countries: United States; Mexico
- Languages: English; Spanish
- Budget: $20 million
- Box office: $149.3 million

Beverly Hills Chihuahua is a 2008 comedy film produced by Walt Disney Pictures, the first in the Beverly Hills Chihuahua series. It was directed by Raja Gosnell and stars Piper Perabo, Jamie Lee Curtis and Manolo Cardona as the human leads, and Drew Barrymore, George Lopez and Andy García in voice roles. An international co-production of the United States and Mexico, the plot centers on a female Chihuahua named Chloe, who is dognapped in Mexico and must escape from a Doberman predator, El Diablo, with help from a lonely German Shepherd, Delgado, and a hyperactive male Chihuahua, Papi, who has a desperate crush on her.

Beverly Hills Chihuahua was released in the United States on October 3, 2008. It received mixed reviews from critics and grossed $149 million on a $20 million budget. It was followed by two sequels, Beverly Hills Chihuahua 2 in 2011, and Beverly Hills Chihuahua 3: Viva la Fiesta! in 2012.

== Plot ==
In Beverly Hills, California, wealthy businesswoman Vivian "Viv" Ashe leaves her richly pampered pet chihuahua, Chloe, with her irresponsible niece, Rachel, while she embarks on a business trip for ten days. Papi, the landscaper Sam's pet Chihuahua, has an unrequited crush on Chloe, which she is annoyed by, as she is unable to put up with his quick wit and unorthodox lifestyle. On a whim, Rachel decides to go to Mexico with her friends and brings Chloe along. When Rachel leaves Chloe alone in the hotel room to go dancing at a club, Chloe goes looking for her, but gets dognapped as she tries to find Rachel and is sent to the dog fights in Mexico City. There, she meets a street-smart German Shepherd named Delgado. Rachel comes back to the hotel and is frantic when she finds Chloe missing.

Chloe is picked to fight in the pit against El Diablo, a fierce Argentinean-Bolivian Doberman Pinscher. Delgado helps her escape the dog fights, unleashing the other dogs from their cages and unlocking the ring to allow both Chloe and himself to flee. After several arguments, he then decides to return her to Beverly Hills safely. Meanwhile, Rachel and Sam go to the Mexican police and offer rewards in an effort to find Chloe. El Diablo is sent by the dog fight ringleader, Vasquez, to capture Chloe.

Chloe and Delgado split up when Delgado goes to get help to return Chloe to Beverly Hills. While he is gone, Chloe saves a pack rat named Manuel from being eaten by an iguana named Chico. Manuel gratefully offers to take Chloe's collar to a ship for the captain to read it, and Chloe accepts. When Delgado returns and finds out what happened, he explains that it was all a con to steal Chloe's expensive collar, and that in reality, iguanas are vegetarians.

The dogs reach the border by train, but they're caught when the conductor of the train wanders back to the place they and the other dogs are hiding. They're forced to jump out, eventually arriving in the barren deserts of Chihuahua, where Delgado explains that he was a former police dog; he was retired after he lost his sense of smell during a raid and a sneak attack from El Diablo. Chloe and Delgado are attacked by a group of mountain lions, but are rescued by a group of Chihuahuas led by a long-haired Chihuahua named Montezuma. Montezuma teaches Chloe that Chihuahuas are a "tiny but mighty" breed, and tells her to find her bark. He offers to let Chloe stay with them, but she declines, saying that someone is waiting for her at home. She realizes Papi meant well (even if his approach needed work), and regrets not giving him fair a chance or settling their differences.

Rachel and Sam are in Puerto Vallarta and find that Chloe was spotted in the state of Chihuahua. After tracking Chloe and Delgado from Mexico City, El Diablo arrives in Chihuahua and attempts to capture Chloe. Papi saves her and ends up getting captured in a cage inside an abandoned Aztec temple. Delgado encounters Manuel and Chico with Chloe's collar, and Manuel frantically explains that they wanted Delgado to smell the collar to find Chloe. Delgado responds that he can't, but Manuel convinces him to try. Delgado smells the collar, and is finally able to track Chloe's scent; taking the collar with him. Chloe rescues Papi, but Delgado discovers that El Diablo - in turn - attempts to attack; yet Delgado defeats him. Rachel finds Chloe with the two happily reuniting, and Vasquez is arrested by the police while El Diablo manages to escape.

Chloe returns safely to Beverly Hills without Vivian finding out what happened and accepts trying a romantic relationship with Papi, as well as Rachel with Sam. The characters' fates are later revealed: Delgado returns to being a police dog in Mexico; El Diablo is eventually recaptured by Delgado and is adopted by a rich lady who "had a passion for fashion"; Chico and Manuel move to Beverly Hills and become rich; and Papi and Chloe have their first date.

== Cast ==
- Drew Barrymore as Chloe Winthrop Ashe - a White Chihuahua
- Andy García as Delgado - a grown up German Shepherd
- George Lopez as Papi Cortez - a brown Chihuahua
- Piper Perabo as Rachel Ashe
- Manolo Cardona as Sam Cortez
- Jamie Lee Curtis as Vivian "Viv" Ashe
- José María Yazpik as Vasquez
- Plácido Domingo as Montezuma (nicknamed Monte) - a Long-haired Chihuahua
- Jesús Ochoa as Officer Ramirez
- Edward James Olmos as El Diablo - a Dobermann predator
- Ali Hillis as Angela
- Maury Sterling as Rafferty
- Eugenio Derbez as Store Owner
- Marguerite Moreau as Blair
- Paul Rodriguez as Chico - an Iguana
- Cheech Marin as Manuel - a male Rat
- Luis Guzmán as Chucho - a Mongrel
- Eddie "Piolín" Sotelo as Rafa - an American Pit Bull Terrier
- Loretta Devine as Delta - a Toy Poodle
- Michael Urie as Sebastian - a Pug
- Leslie Mann as Biminy - a Yorkshire Terrier (uncredited)
- Lisa Marie Quillinan as Carthay Hotel Poodle - a Poodle
- Roxanne Noelle Poynter as Chebé - a Newfoundland (uncredited)

== Production ==
Chloe was named after writer Analisa LaBianco's dog, a 4-year-old Chihuahua puppy.

=== Visual effects ===
The Cinesite studio used their specially developed pipeline for creating digital muzzle replacements, animated the many talking dogs. The in-house visual effects supervisor was Matt Johnson, and the animation supervisor was Alexander Williams. The chihuahua regularly changes throughout the film. Tippett Studio was also used for the visual effects and helped with Manuel and Chico.

=== Music ===
The film score was written by composer Heitor Pereira, who recorded the score with the Hollywood Studio Symphony at the Eastwood Scoring Stage at Warner Bros.

== Reception ==
=== Critical reception ===
Beverly Hills Chihuahua received mixed reviews from critics. As of April 2025, the film holds a 41% approval rating on Rotten Tomatoes, based on 98 reviews, with an average rating of 5.1 out of 10. The site's critical consensus reads: "Despite hitting some sweet notes, Beverly Hills Chihuahua is little more than disposable family entertainment". On Metacritic, the film has a score of 41 out of 100 based on 22 critics, indicating "mixed or average" reviews. Audiences polled by CinemaScore gave the film an average grade of "A" on an A+ to F scale.

Mark Olsen of the Los Angeles Times wrote in his review: "One could try to overlook the film's view of Mexico as an either-or land of resort poshness and street-level poverty, chiefly populated by criminals and hustlers of all stripes, except that view forms the entire film, driving the narrative impulse by which the spoiled puppy makes her journey". Olsen also wrote: "Think of it as the Paris Hilton Complex, that idea of young people as little princesses and princes who get what they want, and what they want is easy pickings and a life without engagement". Walter Addiego of the San Francisco Chronicle gave a positive review, writing that "the film combines the themes of dignity and empowerment – 'We are tiny, but we are mighty', says the leader of a vast Chihuahua pack – with a story of a spoiled rich canine who learns not to be so high and mighty, the film hits all the typical Disney notes. There's even a politically correct message at the end advising would-be dog adopters to make sure they know what they're getting into".

=== Box office ===
Beverly Hills Chihuahua was a commercial success. The film grossed $29,300,465 on its opening weekend from 3,215 theaters, averaging about $9,114 per theater, and ranking number 1 at the box office for that weekend. On its second weekend, the film arrived number 1 again with $17,502,077. As of May 10, 2009, Beverly Hills Chihuahua has grossed $94,514,402 domestically and $54,767,204 in other territories leading up to a total of $149,281,606 worldwide.

=== Home media ===
Beverly Hills Chihuahua was released by Walt Disney Studios Home Entertainment on March 3, 2009, in the US and May 25 in the UK on Disney DVD and Blu-ray. As of November 1, 2009, the DVD has sold over 3 million copies, generating $59,918,764 in sales revenue.

== Sequels ==
A direct-to-video sequel was released for DVD and Blu-ray on February 1, 2011 by Walt Disney Studios Home Entertainment. George Lopez returned as the voice of Papi. Drew Barrymore, Jamie Lee Curtis, Piper Perabo, Manolo Cardona, and Andy García didn't reprise their roles. Odette Annable replaced Barrymore for the sequels.

Another direct-to-video sequel was released on DVD and Blu-ray on September 18, 2012, with Lopez once again reprising his role as Papi, making him the only actor from the original film to appear in the sequels.
