= Resident Evil: Vendetta =

- Japanese theatrical release poster

Japanese name
- Kanji: バイオハザード：ヴェンデッタ
Transcriptions
- Revised Hepburn: Baiohazādo: Vendetta
- Directed by: Takanori Tsujimoto
- Written by: Makoto Fukami
- Based on: Resident Evil by Capcom
- Produced by: Hiroyasu Shinohara; Kei Miyamoto
- Starring: Kevin Dorman; Matthew Mercer; Erin Cahill; John DeMita; Cristina Vee; Fred Tatasciore
- Music by: Kenji Kawai
- Production company: Marza Animation Planet
- Distributed by: Kadokawa
- Release date: May 27, 2017 (Japan)
- Running time: 97 minutes
- Country: Japan
- Language: English
- Box office: $1.6 million

Resident Evil: Vendetta, known as Biohazard: Vendetta (Japanese: バイオハザード：ヴェンデッタ, Hepburn: Baiohazādo: Vendetta) in Japan, is a 2017 English-language Japanese adult animated biopunk action horror film set in the same universe as the Resident Evil video games. Produced by Marza Animation Planet and Capcom producer Hiroyuki Kobayashi, the film features the characters Chris Redfield, Leon S. Kennedy and Rebecca Chambers. Takashi Shimizu also served as executive producer, and Capcom producer Hiroyuki Kobayashi supervised the film. It is the third CG film, preceded by Resident Evil: Degeneration (2008) and Resident Evil: Damnation (2012), and also the third film installment with Leon Kennedy as a main character. It was released in Japan on May 27, 2017. A sequel, Resident Evil: Death Island, was released in 2023.

== Plot ==
In 2014, (Note: Between the events of Resident Evil 6 (2012) and Resident Evil: Death Island (2023)) BSAA agent Chris Redfield is tracking Glenn Arias, a former CIA operative-turned arms dealer. Arias, wanting revenge against the U.S. government for killing his friends and family in a drone strike at his wedding, is developing and smuggling bioweapons into the country, so Chris and other agents infiltrate a mansion in Mexico, to rescue their missing undercover source, Cathy White. There, Chris's fellow agents are ambushed by zombies and death traps, with Chris being the sole survivor. Outside the mansion, Chris faces Arias, who reveals that Cathy has become a zombie under his control. As Arias leaves with his associates, father and daughter Diego and Maria Gomez, the BSAA rescues Chris by slaughtering Cathy and the remaining zombie horde.

Four months later, Professor Rebecca Chambers, former S.T.A.R.S. unit member and survivor of the Mansion Incident, studies the new "Animality Virus"—"A-virus" for short—that can lay dormant inside any individual until the right trigger is presented. The virus has three components: the base virus, the triggering virus, and the vaccine. Maria attacks the research labs and releases the virus via the aerosol form. While her colleagues turn into zombies, Rebecca formulates a vaccine to make herself immune and is eventually rescued by Chris and his BSAA team: D.C., Damian, and Nadia. He briefs her on his mission.

Rebecca recognizes the zombies' loyalty to the host and makes a connection to Las Plagas, the bioweapon used by the Los Illuminados who Division of Security Operations (DSO) agent Leon S. Kennedy once encountered in Europe, theorizing that the remaining members of the cult are providing information to Arias in developing the A-virus. She, alongside Redfield, heads to Colorado to bring Leon on board but is unwilling at first after experiencing guilt on having to kill the infected SWAT team sent to back him up during a viral outbreak disguised as a bomb threat and his repetitive experiences. During this conversation, Maria and Diego attack the trio. They successfully capture Rebecca, while Chris and Leon, who agree to help finish the mission, devise a rescue operation, decrypting Arias' plan of a large-scale viral attack on New York City.

Arias then challenges Chris to rescue Rebecca, who is injected with a vaccine-resistant virus that threatens to turn her into a zombie as part of his personal plan to re-start the failed wedding. As Arias' associates initiate their attack on New York by releasing the virus-laden gas via tankers, Leon and Chris' BSAA team destroy the vehicles and contain the virus, incapacitating Maria in the process, but Damian is killed by zombie dogs.

Chris, later joined by Leon, then infiltrates Arias' safe house, defeats Diego, and rescues Rebecca. On the terrace, Chris engages Arias in combat and throws him through a glass terrace to his demise. Diego then arrives and, despite being badly injured after being defeated by Chris, merges with Arias to form a new Tyrant monster. Chris is no match against the Tyrant until Leon joins the fight after working through the safe house, mowing down zombies. With the assistance of D.C. and Nadia, they trap the Tyrant before Leon and Chris kill it. They locate the antidote that Arias kept and cure Rebecca before escaping by helicopter. The team then spreads the antidote across the city to cure the rest of the infected. Meanwhile, Maria, later revealed to be alive, discovers her now-dead father.

== Voice cast ==
Character	Japanese voice actor	English voice actor
Chris Redfield	Hiroki Touchi	Kevin Dorman
Leon S. Kennedy	Toshiyuki Morikawa	Matthew Mercer
Rebecca Chambers	Ami Koshimizu	Erin Cahill
Glenn Arias	Takuya Kirimoto	John DeMita
Diego Gomez	Ryūzaburō Ōtomo	Fred Tatasciore
Maria Gomez	Sayaka Ohara	Cristina Vee
D.C.	Hayato Fujii	Arif S. Kinchen
Damian	Masaki Aizawa	Arnie Pantoja
Nadia	Haruka Tomatsu	Kari Wahlgren
Patricio	Tetsu Shiratori	Alexander Polinsky

== Production ==
On October 15, 2015, Marza Animation Planet announced that they "decided to make a full-length CG animation movie" of Resident Evil series, which was referred to as a "reboot" and was set to be released in 2017. The title of the work-in-progress Resident Evil film was revealed as Resident Evil: Vendetta on March 25, 2016. In addition, a new promotional picture was released by Italian motorcycle manufacturer Ducati and the film studio at the 43rd Tokyo Motorcycle Show, showcasing Leon Kennedy with Ducati's newest XDiavel model motorcycle as part of an advertising agreement. In the film, Leon rides a Ducati XDiavel during the "action-packed scenes and at the climax of the movie". Capcom stated that despite being called a reboot, it is still actually just a sequel. They were actually referring to the film's new tone. The first trailer was released during the Tokyo Game Show on September 17, 2016, along with new footage of Resident Evil 7: Biohazard.

Capcom Producer Hiroyuki Kobayashi wanted Leon to be the main character, while the film producers wanted Chris to be the lead; in the end, both were used. Kobayashi also suggested that Rebecca Chambers be included, marking her return to the franchise, which was accepted. Since she had not been part of a Resident Evil story in a while, the team used the opportunity to explore how she had matured in the intervening time. The chase scene between Leon and dogs was almost removed from the film, but director Takanori Tsujimoto pushed for it to be kept.

== Release ==
To promote the film, a virtual reality experience for PlayStation VR, titled Resident Evil: Vendetta – Infected Experience, was released on May 24, 2017, for free. Resident Evil: Vendetta was released in Japanese theaters on May 27, 2017, after a premiere in Shinjuku on May 26. A limited theatrical showing in United Kingdom took place on June 14, 2017, and Fathom Events held a special one-night showing of the film across select theaters in North America on June 19, 2017. The film became available in North America across digital retailers on June 20 and on Ultra HD Blu-ray, Blu-ray and DVD on July 18 through Sony Pictures Home Entertainment, under the Stage 6 Films banner. The original soundtrack composed by Kenji Kawai was released on July 7, 2017, through iTunes Store. On September 6, 2017, the film was released on Ultra HD Blu-ray, Blu-ray and DVD in Japan.

== Reception ==
=== Box office ===
At the box office, Resident Evil: Vendetta grossed ¥150 million ($1.34 million) in Japan, and $256,320 in other territories, for a worldwide total of $1.6 million.

On home video, the film earned $1.61 million from DVD and Blu-ray sales in the United States.

=== Critical response ===
According to Rotten Tomatoes, 43% of 7 sampled critics gave the film a positive review, with an average rating of 5.4/10.

Blair Marnell of IGN gave the film 4.5 out of 10 stars and stated, "The occasionally cool-looking moments aren't enough to make up for the tedious pace and horrible script. The voice actors did the best that they could with the material, but there's no vaccine for this movie." Jordan Farley of Total Film gave the film a 2 out of 5 stars and stated, "The anime-inspired action is intermittently entertaining, but story, voice acting and animation are dead rubbish."

Jonathan Barkan of Dread Central gave it 4 out of 5 and stated, "Simply put, it's an absolute blast and I can't wait for more!" Collider gave it a B− grade, and wrote "It's worth a watch for sure, but it's also certain to be appreciated by fans of the franchise moreso than others."

== Sequel ==
On February 7, 2023, IGN released a teaser trailer for Resident Evil: Death Island, which is a sequel to Vendetta. It was theatrically released in the summer of 2023. It also received a physical and digital release on July 25th, 2023.

== See also ==
- List of films based on video games
