= Beverly Hills Chihuahua 3: Viva la Fiesta! =

2012 film directed by Lev L. Spiro

- Official DVD cover
- Directed by: Lev L. Spiro
- Written by: Dana Starfield
- Based on: Beverly Hills Chihuahua by Jeff Bushell
- Produced by: David Hoberman; Sara E. White
- Starring: Odette Annable; George Lopez; Logan Grove; Marcus Coloma; Erin Cahill; Emily Osment; Ernie Hudson; Lacey Chabert; Jake Busey; Briana Lane; Tom Kenny; Miguel Ferrer
- Cinematography: Greg Gardiner
- Edited by: Matthew Colonna
- Music by: Heitor Pereira
- Production company: Walt Disney Pictures
- Distributed by: Walt Disney Studios; Home Entertainment
- Release date: September 18, 2012
- Running time: 89 minutes
- Countries: United States; Mexico
- Language: English
- Box office: $14.8 million (DVD sales)

Beverly Hills Chihuahua 3: Viva la Fiesta! is a 2012 American comedy film directed by Lev L. Spiro. It is the third and final installment of the Beverly Hills Chihuahua series, and stars George Lopez, Odette Annable and Logan Grove. The film focuses on Papi, Chloe and the puppies moving to a hotel. Pedro finds love when he falls head over heels for Charlotte.

The film was released by Walt Disney Studios Home Entertainment on September 18, 2012, in a two-disc Blu-ray/DVD combo pack. Zachary Gordon and Chantily Spalan did not reprise their roles as Papi Jr. and Rosa. This was Kay Panabaker's final film before her retirement to study zoology and become an animal keeper at Disney's Animal Kingdom.

== Plot ==
Two years after their wedding, Rachel and Sam decide to find new jobs. The Langham Hotel is willing to let anybody who can take the place of the landscaper and sous-chef live in the hotel. Sam and Rachel bring Chloe and Papi to the hotel, where Chloe and Papi meet Oscar and Jenny, the hotel's Doggy Day School teachers. Papi is less than thrilled when he discovers he will no longer be teaching the pups. Mr. Hollis, the manager, notices Chloe and asks if she can make appearances as the hotel has gained a major threat, Montague, a new hotel rivaling the Langham. Because of this Sam and Rachel get the jobs. Rosa is also not much happier at the thought of Doggy Day School. Pedro also comes along to the Langham decked out in sunnies. The humans, chihuahuas and Pedro are blown away at their room's luxury. However Rosa isn't feeling happy and is nervous about day school. Papi comforts her, telling her about how he was a chamberlain at a friend's Quinceañera when Pedro finds a picture in a box marked "DO NOT OPEN". Papi tells her what a Quinceanera is about. Later, Chloe, Papi, Sam and Rachel start work and the puppies go to school.

Rachel meets her boss, Chef Didier, an uptight French-accented man who is very fond of himself. When somebody quits, Chef says that he fired him. When he and Rachel meet, he tells her to wash dishes and then throws herbs at her face. Sam meets his assistant, Lester, who is lazy and tired and leaves Sam to do all the work. Rosa is being bullied by a large dog who teases her for having to wear swimmies. Rosa runs off, upset and embarrassed and the puppies get payback on the dog by stretching its spandex and releasing it back at the dog. Papi finds Sam and offers assistance, but just as he begins to help, he hears a rustling sound and finds an overgrown and messy garden. There, he meets Arnie, a stray dog who is a mute. Oscar then arrives as Jenny quickly leaves, not wanting to be seen or heard. Papi is concerned for the pups' safety and asks Oscar what is going on. Oscar, however, doesn't want to mention anything and leaves Papi to ponder what is going on. Arnie makes a carving of Jenny to warn Papi, but Papi doesn't understand it at first.

Back at the house, Rosa fakes being sick to avoid going back to school but when Papi says she will have to go to the vet, she claims she is feeling much better. She claims that she does not want to be a runt anymore and states she wants to be a Quince. When the other pups assume it is "One of dad's weird Mexican holidays", they state they want a sweet sixteen, but Rosa says she wants a Quince and Papi promises to throw her one. The next day, an old friend, Sebastian, arrives (as one does) and helps with the party planning. But in the midst of the party planning, Papi continues to be his paranoid self and was pressured due to the lot of errands he has been working on. As more proof of Jenny and Oscar scheming something behind their backs, and Rosa saving a dog, Charlotte, who was a VIP guest at the hotel and lost her tag in the pool who could not swim properly and fell in while trying to retrieve it, they contact Delgado, to help with their plan on catching Jenny and preparing Rosa's quince.

The next day, Papi, Pedro and Arnie are together, with Pedro keeping watch. Jenny appears, telling Oscar to be quiet. She trips and falls into a large puddle of peanut butter, and Pedro calls more dogs. When Hollis overhears the commotion, Pedro opens the gate, and Delgado appears with Montague, the competitor hotel manager, hung upside down. A bewildered Chloe comes and apologizes to Papi. After a while, Chloe and Papi wake up Rosa with quince outfits for her and her siblings and get ready. As the quince starts, Ali reveals that she was the one who mentioned Charlotte's rescue to the other pups. Jenny and Oscar are arrested, Papi becomes the new teacher at the doggy day school, and Hollis adopts Arnie.

== Cast ==
=== Humans ===
- Marcus Coloma as Sam Cortez
- Erin Cahill as Rachel Ashe-Cortez
- Cedric Yarbrough as Hollis
- Frances Fisher as Amelia James (Charlotte's owner)
- Briana Lane as Jenny
- Sebastian Roche as Chef Frank Didier
- Jason Brooks as Mr. Montague
- Kyle Gass as Lester
- Amanda Fuller as Spa Employee
- Michael Lanahan as BellHop #1
- Sam Pancake as Frederick
- Eddie "Piolín" Sotelo as Hotel Security Guard
- Jeff Witzke as Cook
- Dana Rutkin as Assistant Cook
- Garen Boyajian as Bellhop #2
- J. P. Manoux as Gustavo
- Cara Santana as Jillian

=== Dogs ===
- George Lopez as Papi Cortez, a Brown Chihuahua and Chloe's husband.
- Odette Annable as Chloe Winthrop Ashe-Cortez, a White Chihuahua and Papi's wife.
- Ernie Hudson as Pedro Cortez
- Kay Panabaker as Rosa Cortez; Panabaker replaced Chantilly Spalan as the voice of Rosa, a Long-haired Chihuahua.
- Logan Grove as Papi Cortez Jr.; Grove replaced Zachary Gordon as the voice of Papi Jr.
- Emily Osment as Pep Cortez
- Madison Pettis as Lala Cortez
- Delaney Jones as Ali Cortez, a Long-haired Chihuahua
- Tom Kenny as Sebastian, a Pug and Chloe's friend.
- Jake Busey as Oscar, Jenny's pet dog.
- Lacey Chabert as Charlotte James, a Japanese Spitz.
- Miguel Ferrer as Officer Delgado, a German Shepherd.
- Phil LaMarr as Diego and Black Labbeth Bassist
- Eddie "Piolín" Sotelo as Humberto
- Nick Eversman as Phil
- Lev L. Spiro as Black Labbeth Guitarist
