= Paul Freeman (musician) =

Welsh musician

- Born: South Wales, UK
- Genres: Folk
- Instruments: Vocals, guitar, piano
- Labels: Arista
- Spouse: Erin Cahill (m. 2016)

Paul Freeman is a Welsh singer and musician.

== Early life ==
Freeman was born in South Wales. He found his first guitar atop a dumpster, although his parents and grandparents bought the 12-year-old Freeman a new six-string and a book of chords the following Christmas. Freeman's first song came two years later, an ode called "Some Day." Freeman contends that he is completely self-taught as a musician.

During high school, Freeman worked at Linford Manor, a recording studio in Great Linford, where he says he taught himself to play piano. Said Freeman: "There were all these wonderful instruments lying around. I would never go to bed, I would just stay up and play them. What really got me into playing the piano was having access to the grand piano at the studio."

== Career ==
Freeman moved first to London and became a guitar player for James Blunt. Freeman moved to Santa Monica, California, after reading East of Eden by John Steinbeck. "This Steinbeck book was so inspiring, because it's so detailed and vivid. I moved months after that." Six months after emigrating, Freeman released an EP.

Freeman's music came to attention of Michael King, founder of King World Productions, who invited Freeman to play a benefit concert. Contacts made from the benefit brought Freeman's EP to the attention of Clive Davis, who signed Freeman to Arista Records after a bidding war. Freeman says he devises a song's title before he ever writes the song.

Freeman calls Bruce Springsteen, to whom he's sometimes compared, and the Beatles his influences. He also said that his song "Waiting for a Miracle" was "for want of a better phrase, my Obama song or my Clinton song." As Freeman explained it in an interview, the song expresses the need for change in America. Freeman wanders into the crowd during his shows in order "to remind people I'm just a guy playing a guitar. You enjoy music, and I enjoy music." He also toured with Roger Daltrey on the American leg of Daltrey's "Tommy Reborn" tour.

Freeman's EP, You and I, was released on Arista Records on 12 November 2008. His EP That's How It Is was released on 1 August 2009. It was produced by Howard Benson (Daughtry, Flyleaf, Motörhead, My Chemical Romance) and mixed by Chris Lord-Alge.

Freeman's song "That’s How It Is" was featured near the close of an episode of Past Life called "Soul Music" (S01E03), first broadcast on 18 February 2010. His Song "Tightrope" was also featured on the Season Finale of Make It or Break It.

His six-song EP Tightrope was released on 2 March 2010. Freeman's Passing Phase EP was released on iTunes, Amazon.com, and Bandcamp in August 2013.

He released his first-ever live album, Paul Freeman at Volver Live, on 3 November 2014.

== Personal life ==
On 3 September 2016, Freeman married actress Erin Cahill in a ceremony in Côte d'Azur, France. Freeman also writes poetry as well as songs.
