= The Watcher (2016 film) =

2016 American horror film

- Directed by: Ryan Rothmaier
- Written by: Ryan Rothmaier
- Produced by: Dave Fraunces; Jason Ryan
- Starring: Erin Cahill; Edi Gathegi
- Music by: Carson Aune
- Release date: October 1, 2016
- Running time: 89 minutes
- Country: United States
- Language: English

The Watcher is a 2016 American horror film directed by Ryan Rothmaier and starring Erin Cahill and Edi Gathegi. The film follows a young couple who after moving into a new home find themselves being terrorized to leave. The film is inspired by the real case of the so-called "Watcher of Westfield".

== Plot ==
In an attempt to make a new start, young couple Emma (Erin Cahill) and Noah (Edi Gathegi) move to Los Angeles after purchasing a house where the previous tenant died. While moving in Emma and Noah meet neighbors Jeanne (Denise Crosby) and her mentally disabled son Mikey (Riley Baron) as well as the couple across the street, Reggie (Kevin Daniels) and Amanda (Tracie Thoms), with whom they become friends. Soon Emma and Noah begin to receive threatening letters from a mysterious figure calling themselves "The Raven", demanding they leave the house. Emma begins seeing hallucinations.

Shortly afterwards, Emma encounters the previous owner, Wendell Akimoto, in her house, and he makes threatening remarks to her. Emma then activates the house's alarm system and informs the local police about the mysterious incidents. Attempts are made to contact Francine, but all attempts to contact her are unsuccessful, and missing person posters are put up around the city. Emma can hardly sleep due to the events. One evening, Noah invites his neighbor Reggie, with whom he has become friends, over for a beer. When he accompanies him outside later, Noah realizes that he has locked himself out, forcing him to knock on the bedroom window and wake his wife. In doing so, he discovers the person wearing the crow mask standing by his wife's bed. Noah immediately climbs through the window that was broken a few days earlier, which is only covered by a tarpaulin, but when he enters the bedroom, he cannot find the “Raven”. Instead, he finds another threatening letter signed “The Raven.” In this letter, the unknown person threatens to kill the children in the house if Emma and Noah fulfill their desire to have children. Noah suspects Jeanne, as Emma has talked to her about her dead son. The couple is temporarily taken in by Reggie and Amanda. When Noah gets into his van after work, he sees Wendell in the back seat. He tells him that his wife Gladys also befriended Jeanne at the time, as she is a nurse and provided Gladys with medical care. He reveals that Jeanne is behind “The Raven.” Noah informs the police about Wendell's appearance and asks him to tell them everything he knows about Jeanne. Before this can happen, however, Wendell slits his throat. Noah then informs his wife of the danger posed by Jeanne via text message. Emma is out with Jeanne and Mikey at the time. When she receives Noah's message, she immediately flees, but suffers hallucinations and collapses.

When Emma wakes up in the hospital, she and Noah are informed that Jeanne poisoned Emma with her cupcakes, which were laced with bath salts, among other things, and caused the hallucinations. A few days later, Emma is discharged from the hospital and packs all the items in the house into boxes as they prepare to move. Emma is attacked by the “crow man” and locked in a chamber in the house. There, Emma discovers the body of the real estate agent Francine and another threatening letter. Investigator Stark is notified immediately and devises a plan to capture Jeanne in cooperation with Noah and Emma.

The house is offered for sale as bait. In the evening, Jeanne's car approaches the house, but the injured Mikey falls out of the driver's door and is immediately taken to the hospital. Jeanne is also there, wearing a different wig, and she plans to kill Mikey. However, Noah and Emma are able to intervene and prevent Mikey's death. Jeanne is then arrested by the police, and Noah and Emma take Mikey in.

Some time later, they accompany Mikey to a meeting with his mother in the psychiatric ward. There, Mikey reveals that he is actually behind the “Raven” and that his mental disability is just an act to give himself an alibi.

After several months, Mikey continues to live with Noah and Emma, who is now pregnant. While sitting in his tree house, Mikey pulls out part of the crow costume and smiles maliciously.

== Cast ==
- Erin Cahill as Emma
- Edi Gathegi as Noah
- Denise Crosby as Jeanne
- Riley Baron as Mikey
- Kevin Daniels as Reggie
- Tracie Thoms as Amanda
- Ruth Williamson as Francine
