= Rebecca Chambers =

Resident Evil fictional character

- Resident Evil character
- Rebecca Chambers in Resident Evil Zero (2002)
- First appearance: Resident Evil (1996)
- Created by: Shinji Mikami; Isao Ohishi
- Designed by: Isao Ohishi
- Voiced by: English: Lynn Hariss (Resident Evil) Hope Levy (Resident Evil remake) Riva Di Paola (Resident Evil Zero) Stephanie Sheh (The Umbrella Chronicles, Resident Evil 5, The Mercenaries 3D) Erin Cahill (Vendetta, Death Island) Megan Orvold-Scheider (Dead by Daylight); Japanese: Ami Koshimizu (Resident Evil HD Remaster, Resident Evil Zero HD Remaster, Vendetta, Death Island)

Rebecca Chambers (Japanese: レベッカ・チェンバース, Hepburn: Rebekka Chenbāsu) is a character in the Resident Evil survival horror video game series created by the Japanese company Capcom. She was first introduced as a supporting character in the original Resident Evil (1996) and became a player character in the prequel game Resident Evil Zero (2002). In the first Resident Evil, Rebecca is a young officer with the Raccoon Police Department's Special Tactics And Rescue Service (S.T.A.R.S.) unit and is trapped in a zombie-infested mansion.

Rebecca also appears in several Resident Evil games, novelizations, CG-animated films, and other game franchises, including Dead by Daylight (2016). Several actresses have portrayed Rebecca, including American actress Erin Cahill in the animated sequels Resident Evil: Vendetta (2017) and Resident Evil: Death Island (2023).

Rebecca's characterization has received praise from video game publications, with some critics interpreting her as a formidable woman not conforming with sterotypical gender norms

== Concept and design ==
Rebecca Chambers was created by director Shinji Mikami and designer Isao Ohishi. In a 2014 interview, Mikami described Rebecca as his personal least favorite female character in the series because he considered her submissive and lacking in independence. Mikami revealed in another interview that his colleagues at Capcom had wanted a character like Rebecca included in the original Resident Evil because the archetype is popular with Japanese audiences.

Early concept material for the original Resident Evil featured Chris Redfield and Jill Valentine, but not Rebecca or Barry Burton. Jason Faulkner of Shacknews suggested that the latter characters were added later in development. Rebecca was redesigned for Resident Evil Zero (2002) while the game was being developed for the Nintendo 64. Her prototype design included a beret and shoulder pads, both of which were removed from her final appearance. An early version of the story allowed either Rebecca or Billy Coen to die while the other completed the game, but this was abandoned because Rebecca's death would contradict her later appearance in the original Resident Evil.

After a lengthy absence from the franchise, Rebecca returned to a major role in the animated film Resident Evil: Vendetta. Producer Hiroyuki Kobayashi said that the production team wanted to use a female character who had not appeared in the preceding animated films.

=== Portrayal ===
In the original Resident Evil (1996), Rebecca is portrayed in the game's live-action cutscenes by an unknown actress simply credited as "Linda". Rebecca's voice actress in the original game is Lynn Harris. Philip J. Reed reported that fellow cast members Dean Harrington and Barry Gjerde also identified Harris as the uncredited director of the English-language voice cast.

In the 2002 remake, her likeness for Resident Evil Zero is based on Japanese singer Ayumi Hamasaki, who participated in promotional activities for the game in Japan. In Resident Evil: The Umbrella Chronicles (2007), Resident Evil 5: Gold Edition (2009), and Resident Evil: The Mercenaries 3D (2011), she was voiced by Stephanie Sheh. Megan Orvold-Scheider voiced her in Dead by Daylight (2016). In Resident Evil: Vendetta and Resident Evil: Death Island (2023), she was voiced by English actress Erin Cahill and Japanese actress Ami Koshimizu.

For the Japanese versions of the high-definition remasters, Ami Koshimizu characterized Rebecca as a scientifically minded rookie who attempts to appear more confident than she feels. Koshimizu added breaths and emotional reactions that were absent from the English track, reasoning that Rebecca's responses to the creatures should reflect the player's. During recording, the developers asked her to portray Rebecca as initially more guarded towards Billy Coen, since her first performance suggested that Rebecca trusted him too quickly. Rebecca was voiced by English actress Hope Levy and Ami Koshimizu in Japanese.

== Appearances ==
=== In the Resident Evil series ===
Rebecca Chambers makes her first appearance in the original 1996 Resident Evil as a supporting character for Chris Redfield, a fellow officer in the U.S. special police force Special Tactics And Rescue Service (S.T.A.R.S.). She is an 18-year-old rookie member of the unit's Bravo Team and serves as a field medic, additionally in charge of rear security. Before she joined the force, she was a child prodigy and graduated from college at only 18 years old. Rebecca arrives at the Arklay Research Facility to investigate a series of cannibalistic murders with her comrades lost and scattered across the Arklay Mountains. Her introduction and other appearances throughout the first game vary depending on the path the player chooses, and she can be controlled during portions of the story. She may die an off-screen death as well. In the canon version of the story, Rebecca is ultimately rescued by Chris and the Alpha Team, and she emerges as Bravo Team's sole survivor of the incident in the canon version of the story.

In Resident Evil Zero, a prequel to Resident Evil, Rebecca is one of two protagonists. Shortly after Bravo Team had been dispatched to the Arklay Mountains to investigate the murders, she enters a seemingly abandoned train. Coming under attack by zombies and mutated animals, Rebecca encounters escaped death-row military prisoner Billy Coen and cooperates with him. The two discover that the viral zombie outbreak has been masterminded by James Marcus, who had been one of the Umbrella Corporation's top scientists but was assassinated on behalf of the company, only to be revived by the monsters he created. Rebecca and Billy escape the train and find themselves in an old underground facility of the Umbrella Corporation that was overtaken by Marcus in his lust for revenge. In the end, they manage to destroy both Marcus and the facility. Rebecca allows Billy to escape, falsely reporting his death to the authorities.

Rebecca appears in Resident Evil: The Umbrella Chronicles, which summarizes the events of Resident Evil Zero and details her later experiences leading up to Resident Evil. The game pairs her with fellow S.T.A.R.S. Bravo team member Billy Coen as they work together to fend off hordes of undead creatures.

She is confirmed to have survived the events of Resident Evil 2 (1998), in which the character makes an Easter egg–type cameo appearance in an undeveloped film on Wesker's desk. Rebecca is also a playable character in Resident Evil 5: Gold Edition in its minigame mode, Mercenaries Reunion, as well as an unlockable character in Resident Evil: The Mercenaries 3D. She also appears in the Resident Evil mobile game Resident Evil Survival Unit (2025).

=== Other appearances and media ===
An animated film starring Rebecca was released in 2017, titled Resident Evil: Vendetta. In the film, Rebecca, long retired as a police officer, now works at a university as a professor, using her knowledge of medicine to develop possible cures for viruses. When her laboratory is attacked by bio-terrorists, Rebecca is exposed to the new A-virus but uses her newly researched vaccine to save herself. She also appears in the 2023 sequel, Resident Evil: Death Island. Rebecca's youthful appearance in the film was said to be a result of the A-virus slowing her aging.

Rebecca is a protagonist in S. D. Perry's Resident Evil novels published between 1998 and 2004, particularly the original stories Resident Evil: Caliban Cove and Resident Evil: Underworld, and the novelizations of the games in which she appears (Resident Evil: The Umbrella Conspiracy and Resident Evil: Zero Hour). In printed trading card media, she appears as a card in the Bandai-produced game Resident Evil: The Deck Building Game. In 2012, Capcom's themed restaurant "Biohazard Cafe & Grill S.T.A.R.S." featured an undescribed "Rebecca-Style Dessert" on their menu. In the 2015 Japan-exclusive stage play Biohazard: The Stage, Rebecca is a professor at a Western Australian university that becomes the scene of a bioterrorism incident, which reunites her with Chris Redfield as they once again work together. She was portrayed by Rin Asuka.

She appears as a cameo in Tom Clancy's The Division 2 (2019). In 2022, Rebecca was added as a playable character in the asymmetrical survival horror game Dead by Daylight.

== Critical reception ==
Commentary on Rebecca has frequently addressed her elevation from a supporting role in the original Resident Evil to a protagonist in Resident Evil Zero, followed by her comparatively limited use in later games. Brendan Caldwell of Rock Paper Shotgun identified Rebecca as an example of a minor non-player character who became a major character, reasoning that Capcom considered her sufficiently interesting to develop into the co-protagonist of Zero despite the series' generally limited characterization. Official PlayStation Magazine similarly attributed Rebecca's popularity among fans to her starring role in Zero. Mexican magazine Club Nintendo described her as beloved by Resident Evil fans and linked her popularity, together with the opportunity to portray events preceding the Spencer Mansion incident, to Capcom's development of the prequel.

Brittany Vincent of Syfy Wire considered Rebecca underused compared with Jill Valentine and Claire Redfield. Vincent contrasted the frightened, inexperienced rookie introduced in the original Resident Evil with the prequel's revelation that she had already survived the outbreak at Umbrella's training facility immediately beforehand. She argued that surviving both incidents potentially made Rebecca the toughest member of S.T.A.R.S., particularly given her youth and lack of the military experience possessed by several of her colleagues. Vincent also regarded Rebecca's admission to the elite unit at eighteen, after completing a university degree in chemistry, as evidence of her exceptional abilities. She highlighted how the games express that expertise through Rebecca's preparation of chemical compounds and her treatment of Richard Aiken and Chris Redfield, and argued that her actions at both the training facility and Spencer Mansion materially altered the course of the series's events. Observing that she received no further starring role in the video game series after Zero, Vincent said that Rebecca's presentation as a bioterrorism researcher and university professor in Vendetta is a continuation of the scientific and medical abilities established in her earliest appearances, highlighting her development of a cure for the A-virus as evidence of her continuing importance within the series.

Philip J. Reed examined both Rebecca's original performance and her function within the game. He described Lynn Harris's vocal delivery as fluctuating between childlike and adult-sounding speech and between calm and manic emotional states. Reed suggested that Rebecca was less widely remembered than Barry Burton because most players selected Jill's scenario, in which Rebecca does not appear, while her role in Chris Redfield's scenario was principally that of his companion. He nevertheless argued that her scientific abilities are expressed through gameplay rather than merely through her biography: the player controls Rebecca while she prepares the V-JOLT herbicide and retrieves serum for the poisoned Richard Aiken, performing tasks Chris cannot complete himself. Reed consequently regarded her as a character upon whom Chris repeatedly depends for information, progression, and survival.

Other critics focused on the contrast between Rebecca's apparent vulnerability and her practical competence. Andrew Clouther of GameZone praised her abilities in combat and medicine despite her timid behavior around more experienced S.T.A.R.S. members. Jessica Famularo of Inverse similarly praised Rebecca as a capable and loyal field medic whose gentle personality contrasted with the violence surrounding her.

Rebecca's gender presentation has attracted differing interpretations. In a 2003 feature about women in video games, Edge grouped Rebecca with Jill, Claire, and other survival-horror heroines as practical and resourceful female characters who could be portrayed as attractive without relying upon overt sexual display. The magazine contrasted them with both more sexualized video game characters and the passive roles commonly assigned to women in horror films. Gladys L. Knight described Rebecca's standard uniform as comparatively androgynous but observed that several alternate costumes expose her midriff and emphasize her figure. Media critic Anita Sarkeesian identified Rebecca's unlockable nurse and cheerleader outfits as examples of sexualized costumes that undermine otherwise capable professional female characters by presenting their bodies as rewards for players. Jenny Platz placed Rebecca and Claire within what she described as the series's traditional "virgin or tomboy" archetype.

== Bibliography ==
- Reed, Philip J. (2020). Resident Evil. Boss Fight Books. ISBN 978-1-940535-25-8.
- Platz, Jenny (2014). Farghaly, Nadine (ed.). Unraveling Resident Evil: Essays on the Complex Universe of the Games and Films. Jefferson, NC: McFarland & Company. ISBN 978-1476614403.
