= South Beach (2006 TV series) =

American drama television series

- Genre: Soap opera
- Created by: Matt Cirulnick
- Starring: Marcus Coloma; Odette Yustman; Lee Thompson Young; Chris Johnson; Giancarlo Esposito; Vanessa Williams
- Composer: Michael Wandmacher
- Country of origin: United States
- Original language: English
- No. of seasons: 1
- No. of episodes: 8

Production
- Executive producers: Tony Krantz; Jennifer Lopez; Simon Fields; Scott Kaufer; Philip Levens
- Producers: Elayne Keratsis; Terry Miller; Antoinette Stella
- Production companies: Flame Television; Nuyorican Productions; Paramount Network Television

Original release
- Network: UPN
- Release: January 11 – February 22, 2006

South Beach is an American drama television series that aired on UPN from January 11 to February 22, 2006. Created by Matt Cirulnick, one of its executive producers was singer/actress Jennifer Lopez. The program was panned by critics and shunned by viewers, ranking 152nd in the Nielsen TV ratings rankings for the 2005–06 season. It was canceled after eight first-run episodes due to low viewership. South Beach was produced by Paramount Television.

== Synopsis ==
Vincent and Matt are two friends from Brooklyn who decide to move to glamorous South Beach in order to seek out better opportunities. Vincent has aims of meeting with beautiful women and getting ahead by any means necessary, while Matt supposedly only wants to make enough money to return to university, since his father blew his college fund. However, as it turns out, Matt has other reasons for going to South Beach as well.

Several years earlier, Matt was dating Arielle. However, he broke up with her so as to not interfere with her dreams of being a superstar fashion model and pushed her to Miami. There, Arielle met and fell in love with Alex Bauer, the young manager of Nocturnal, South Beach's hottest nightclub. Nocturnal, in turn, is located inside the glitzy Hotel Soleil, where models, celebrities, and other members of the rich and famous regularly spend their sojourns at South Beach. The Hotel Soleil is owned by Alex's mother Elizabeth, a shrewd businesswoman who believes her son is weak and does not have a head for business. On top of that, Elizabeth seems to have a penchant for dating younger men that are her son's age.

Matt's arrival in South Beach causes friction with Alex, who is jealous of his previous relationship with Arielle. Elizabeth did not help things when she gave Matt a job at the Hotel Soleil (thus ensuring that he and Arielle would be seeing a lot of each other) and evidently also had an eye for him as well. Things culminate in a fight between Alex and Matt at Nocturnal; however, Alex ultimately apologizes to Arielle about the fight, and Matt agrees to respect Alex and Arielle's relationship.

Vincent, meanwhile, originally takes a job at the Hotel Soleil as a "spray boy" for female guests who are tanning poolside. However, he soon falls into the dubious employ of one Robert Fuentes, an investor in the hotel who happens to have links to Miami's underworld, and plans to use them to gain greater control of the operations of the hotel. For some time, Fuentes has been pressuring Elizabeth to establish a casino in the Hotel Soleil, but she constantly rebuffs him.

== Cast and characters ==
=== Main ===
- Marcus Coloma as Matt Evans, a Brooklyn native who moves to South Beach with his best friend Vincent in order to seek out better economic opportunities, as well as check up on his ex-girlfriend, Arielle Casta.
- Odette Yustman as Arielle "Ari" Casta, a fashion model in South Beach and Matt's ex-girlfriend. After moving to Miami, she falls in love with Alex Bauer, but still has feelings for Matt, which she doesn't find easy to get over.
- Lee Thompson Young as Alex Bauer, the manager of South Beach's hottest nightclub, Nocturnal, and Arielle's boyfriend. He is very suspicious of Matt, as he feels Matt is trying to rekindle his relationship with Arielle, and also has a strained relationship with his mother, Elizabeth, who feels he is incapable of properly running a business.
- Chris Johnson as Vincent, Matt's best friend who moves with him to South Beach. Vincent is always on the prowl, looking for beautiful women to fall into bed with. He is hired to work for Robert Fuentes after the latter takes notice of his competence, reliability, and loyalty.
- Giancarlo Esposito as Robert Fuentes, a Cuban-American gangster with legitimate business interests; He is an investor in the Hotel Soleil.He hires Vincent as an employee of his after Vincent informs Fuentes of a turncoat within his organization. Fuentes is a strong believer in the occult, and sees spirits as his guiding influences. Fuentes is an organized crime figure, yet we witness his sentimental attachment to a cigarette lighter given to him by his grandfather.
- Vanessa Williams as Elizabeth Bauer, the owner of South Beach's glitziest hotel, the Hotel Soleil, and the mother of Alex. Elizabeth believes Alex is weak and oblivious to the way the business world works. She also angers him by hiring Matt to work in the hotel as her chief security specialist.

=== Recurring ===
- Meghan Ory as Maggie Murphy, the spunky brunette bartender with an angelic singing voice at the Hotel Soleil. An ex-girlfriend of Alex's, Maggie has recently been pursuing a relationship with Matt, much to the chagrin of Arielle.
- Adrianne Palicki as Brianna, a blonde fashion model who has dreams of making it big in the fashion world. Brianna is Arielle's best friend, and has recently been getting sexually involved with Vincent.
- Neil Brown Jr. as hot young Miami D. J. Felix Rodriguez. Felix is close with Vincent's brother from back home in New York and decides to help the guys out when they first move to South Beach.
- Michael Paré as Charlie Evans.

=== Special guest stars ===
- Pitbull as El Guerrero

== Episodes ==
No.	Title	Directed by	Written by	Original release date
1 2	"Pilot" "I'm Not Your Baby"	Jason Ensler (part 1) Darnell Martin (part 2)	Story by : Matt Cirulnick (part 1) Philip Levens (part 2); Teleplay by : Matt Cirulnick & Philip Levens	January 11, 2006
3	"I Want What's Coming to Me"	Peter Medak	Scott Kaufer	January 18, 2006
4	"Every Day Above Ground is a Good Day"	Jason Ensler	Peter Hume	January 25, 2006
5	"Who Do You Trust"	Tim Hunter	Derick Martini & Steven Martini	February 1, 2006
6	"I'll Do What I Wanna Do"	Whitney Ransick	Antoinette Stella	February 8, 2006
7	"The S.B."	David Jackson	Melody Fox	February 15, 2006
8	"It Looked Like Somebody's Nightmare"	Whitney Ransick	Story by : Peter Hume; Teleplay by : Adam Giaudrone	February 22, 2006

== Ratings and reviews ==
Similar to UPN's Fall 2005 effort Sex, Love & Secrets, South Beach was not welcomed by critics. The Miami Herald said that, "Cannibalism is about the only thing missing from this delirious new trashfest of hard bodies and soft brains." The Washington Post's headline for the show was "Bang, Bang, Bling, Bling, Blah, Blah." The writer called the show "vacuous... preposterous and pretentious." The Seattle Times said, "The dialogue's awful, ranging from clichés ('I don't want to work in my uncle's restaurant the rest of my life') to quotations ('First you get the money, then you get the power, then you get the women') to product placements ('Anybody got a Red Bull?').

The show was one of the lowest-rated on television. It ranked 152nd out of the 156 original series produced for network television in the 2005–06 season, with an average of 1.6 million viewers.

South Beach was canceled when it was announced that the new The WB/UPN hybrid network, The CW, would not renew the show for additional seasons.
