= Resident Evil: Death Island =

2023 film by Eiichirō Hasumi

- Theatrical release poster

Japanese name
- Katakana: バイオハザード: デスアイランド
Transcriptions
- Revised Hepburn: Baiohazādo: Desuairando
- Directed by: Eiichirō Hasumi
- Written by: Makoto Fukami
- Based on: Resident Evil by Capcom
- Produced by: Hiroyasu Shinohara; Kei Miyamoto
- Cinematography: Yun M. Watanabe
- Edited by: Mitsuo Nishio
- Music by: Rei Kondoh
- Production companies: Quebico; TMS Entertainment
- Distributed by: Kadokawa
- Release dates: June 22, 2023 (Singapore); July 7, 2023 (Japan)
- Running time: 91 minutes
- Country: Japan
- Language: English
- Box office: $61,511 (Note: $43,161 from the United Arab Emirates, Vietnam, New Zealand and Turkey; and $18,350 from Australia.)

Resident Evil: Death Island (Note: Known as Biohazard: Death Island (Japanese: バイオハザード：デスアイランド, Hepburn: Baiohazādo: Desuairando) in Japan) is a 2023 English-language Japanese adult animated action horror film set in the same universe as the Resident Evil video games. It is the fifth installment and fourth film in the animated Resident Evil series, following the 2017 film Resident Evil: Vendetta and the 2021 miniseries Resident Evil: Infinite Darkness, and follows several Resident Evil protagonists as they investigate possible T-virus bioterrorism in San Francisco. The film premiered in Singapore on June 22, 2023, before its theatrical release in Japan on July 7, 2023.

== Plot ==
In 1998, as the Raccoon City incident begins, the Umbrella Corporation hires a private military firm to help evacuate high-ranking Umbrella executives and government officials. The firm deploys Unit 6, but the majority are bitten by zombies; surviving members JJ and Dylan Blake contact headquarters to seek extraction and medical assistance, but are instructed to quarantine and ultimately eliminate their fellow comrades, leaving JJ in disbelief and angering Dylan. The pair argue until the infected soldiers attack them and bite JJ, forcing Dylan to kill him.

Seventeen years later in 2015, Field Operations Support (FOS) Agent Ingrid Hunnigan tasks Division of Security Operations (DSO) agent Leon S. Kennedy with apprehending DARPA researcher and robotics engineer Doctor Antonio Taylor in San Francisco for selling classified information to foreign powers. During the briefing, Leon learns Taylor was being hunted by the San Francisco Police Department, but was kidnapped by unidentified assailants in a van. Recognizing the van as it passes him, Leon tries to intercept them, but is thwarted by Maria Gomez, a criminal who survived their last encounter the year prior. (Note: As depicted in Resident Evil: Vendetta (2017).) Meanwhile, Bioterrorism Security Assessment Alliance (BSAA) advisor Rebecca Chambers informs Agent Chris Redfield of twelve deaths from an advanced strain of the T-virus, seemingly forcibly injected into the victims. Chris visits his partner Jill Valentine, hoping to stop her from taking part in the operation due to her time under Albert Wesker's mind control and subsequent mental health issues, (Note: As depicted in Resident Evil 5 (2009).) but she refuses.

Chris and Jill meet with Rebecca and Chris's sister Claire Redfield to discuss their findings, during which Claire notes her discovery of an orca infected with the same advanced T-virus strain swimming near the Greater Farallones National Marine Sanctuary, which had also happened to several missing whales. Discovering that all of the human victims had visited Alcatraz Island before they died, Jill and the Redfields travel there posing as tourists, but are separated when it is stricken by a sudden zombie outbreak. While exploring the sewers, Jill encounters Leon and joins him in fending off a new form of Lickers before eventually reaching the armory, where they find blueprints for mosquito-like drones used to infect people with the virus. However, they are captured by Dylan and thrown into a prison cell with Taylor and the Redfields. Believing there is no justice in the world, Dylan uses the drones to infect the Redfields and Leon, sparing Jill so she can witness her friends die like how he was forced to watch his team die in Raccoon City. He then reveals that he has taken over arms dealer Glenn Arias' crime syndicate and joined forces with Maria, who seeks revenge for her father Diego's death, before fatally shooting Taylor and escaping to use his drones around the world. As he dies, Taylor gives Claire a code for controlling the drones. While Jill pursues Dylan, she encounters Rebecca, who prepares a vaccine for the group and cures them. Leon pursues Maria and kills her after a brutal confrontation.

The Redfields, Jill, Leon, and Rebecca regroup to fight Dylan in the final battle, who merges himself with a bio-organic weapon and overpowers the group. Claire and Rebecca take control of Dylan's drones and program them to infect him and weakening him enough for Jill, Leon, and Chris to kill him with explosive weaponry. As the group awaits BSAA rescue helicopters, Chris praises Jill's heroism.

== Voice cast ==
| Character | Japanese voice actor | English voice actor |
|---|---|---|
| Leon S. Kennedy | Toshiyuki Morikawa | Matthew Mercer |
| Jill Valentine | Atsuko Yuya | Nicole Tompkins |
| Chris Redfield | Hiroki Tōchi | Kevin Dorman |
| Claire Redfield | Yūko Kaida | Stephanie Panisello |
| Rebecca Chambers | Ami Koshimizu | Erin Cahill |
| Dylan Blake | Takehito Koyasu | Daman Mills |
| Maria Gomez | Sayaka Ohara | Cristina Vee |
| Ingrid Hunnigan | Yū Sugimoto | Salli Saffioti |
| Antonio Taylor | Yōji Ueda | Frank Todaro |
| JJ | Toshiki Masuda | Lucien Dodge |

== Production and release ==
On February 2, 2023, the film was announced by Sony Pictures Home Entertainment, with IGN posting an exclusive trailer for the film and reported that the film will release in mid-2023, is directed by Eiichirō Hasumi and is written by Makoto Fukami. Sony Pictures Home Entertainment distributed the film worldwide, excluding Japan.

The film was released theatrically first in Singapore on June 22, 2023, in Taiwan and Malaysia on June 29, and Greece on July 6, before its release in Japan on July 7. The film also released theatrically in Mexico on July 13, 2023. In all other regions, it was released via video on demand along with DVD, Blu-ray, and 4K Blu-ray on July 25, 2023.

=== Manga ===
In May 2023, Capcom announced a manga adaptation of Death Island, which will be serialized monthly on Kadokawa Corporation's Comic Hu, via Nico Nico Seiga. It is drawn by ZINO Kodakujii.

== Promotion ==
On April 18, 2023, Little Armory announced that they would produce 1/12 scale models of small arms used by Chris, Jill and Leon (M60, AA12, and M870).

On April 19, 2023, Seiko, in collaboration with Capcom, announced two Resident Evil watches inspired by the film. The two watches will be based on designs inspired by Chris and Leon, released in May, limited to 600 copies worldwide.

== Critical reception ==
On the review aggregator website Rotten Tomatoes, 71% of seven reviews are positive, with an average rating of 6.3/10.

IGN gave the film a 6 out of 10, and wrote "A strong sense of action and movement, but lacking on that whole talking thing." Bloody Disgusting gave it three out of five, writing that "Death Island is a solid meeting of both game and film characters, and in several respects, it outshines the last three outings. The film may not ultimately have any effect on the game series, but it is a sign that the animated Resident Evil franchise is finally starting to get its act together." Paste rated it 4.5/10, stating "Over the years, Resident Evil has cultivated many distinct strains of action-horror. Unfortunately, Death Island makes for one of its least-potent variants."
