= Erin Cahill =

American actress (born 1980)

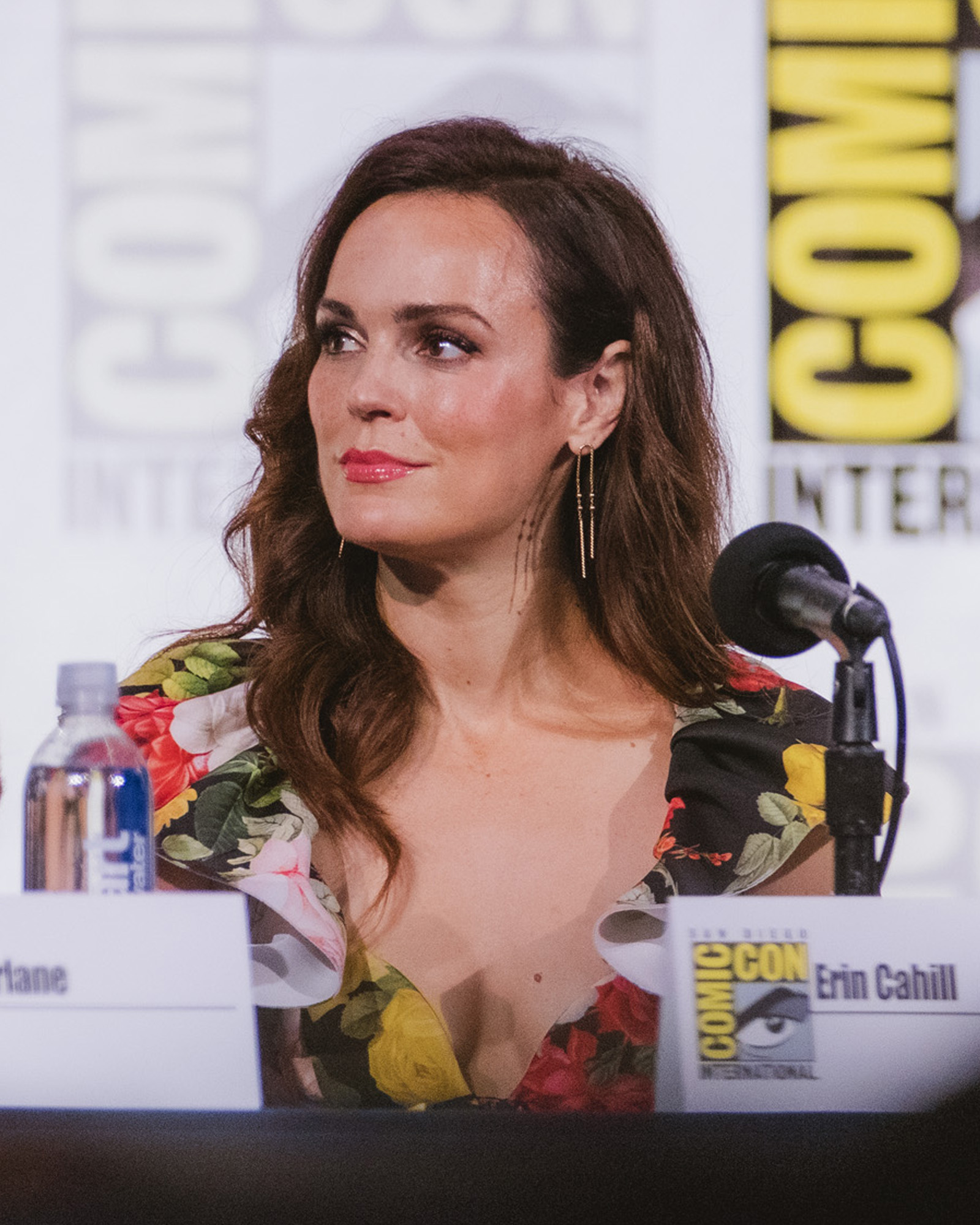
- Cahill in 2025
- Born: Erin Jessica Cahill; January 4, 1980 (age 46); Stafford, Virginia, U.S.
- Occupation: Actress
- Years active: 1996–present
- Spouse: Paul Freeman (m. 2016)

Erin Jessica Cahill (born January 4, 1980) is an American actress. She is best known for her roles as Jennifer Scotts in Power Rangers Time Force, Ted Mosby's sister Heather in How I Met Your Mother, and Kendra Burke in Saving Grace. She had a recurring role as Felicity in the ABC series Red Widow. She is also noted to be the first lead female character for the Call of Duty franchise, as Chloe 'Karma' Lynch in Call of Duty: Black Ops II and Rebecca Chambers in Resident Evil: Vendetta. Since 2016, Cahill has worked primarily in television movies for Lifetime and Hallmark.

== Early life ==
Cahill was born in Stafford, Virginia. She began acting in her mother's local high school productions at age four, and started singing and dancing lessons at age eight. She was Miss Pre-Teen Virginia in 1991 and the first runner-up for Miss Junior America.

== Career ==
Cahill was cast as Jen Scotts, the Pink Time Force Ranger, in Power Rangers Time Force. She started her guest starring roles in 2003 with Crossing Jordan and General Hospital. In 2006, she starred in the short-lived Fox series Free Ride. Her first big guest star came the following year in 2007 as a 20th-century suffragette in the Cold Case episode "Torn". Since then, she has worked in numerous films and television shows such as Supernatural, CSI: Miami, The Mentalist, Castle, Ghost Whisperer, Grey's Anatomy, and House. She has appeared in commercials for Bank of America, TJ Maxx, Hyundai, Applebee's, Redfin, Tampax, Lean Cuisine, Honda, and Land Rover Discovery Sport.

In 2013, Cahill's projects included the short film The Ventriloquist, voice and motion-capture credits as Chloe "Karma" Lynch in Call of Duty: Black Ops II, and a guest role as Lena Gilbert in FOX's Sleepy Hollow.

The following year, Cahill guest-starred on NCIS: Los Angeles and made a brief appearance on Garfunkel and Oates.

Cahill's international commercial for Land Rover Discovery Sport ran in 2015. She has also appeared in commercials for Redfin.

In October 2022, Cahill signed an exclusive multi-picture contract with Hallmark Media.

== Charity work ==
Cahill co-founded Charitable Living, which services the local community with fundraisers and days of volunteering. In May 2015, Cahill joined non-profit group BuildOn and traveled to Malawi to promote education and build schools.

== Personal life ==
In September 2016, Cahill married Welsh musician Paul Freeman in a ceremony on the Cote d'Azur, France.

== Filmography ==
=== Film ===
Year	Title	Role	Notes
2000	Speed for Thespians	Sister	Short
2003	Bill the Intern	Darlene	
2004	Creature Unknown	Jill	
2004	Stunt C*cks	Pot Luck Dinner Guest	Short
2005	Frostbite	Coffee Shop Patron	Video
2005	Race You to the Bottom	Waitress	
2005	The Biggest Fan	Montana Wastedberg	
2005	This Town's Called Crash	-	Short
2006	Life Is Short	Mabel	Short
2007	Sweet	Cindi	Short
2007	The Mirror	Nina Theophilus	
2007	Jekyll	Allison	
2007	Open House	Wife	Short
2008	Fast Track: No Limits	Katie Reed	
2008	Boogeyman 3	Sarah Morris	
2008	Our Feature Presentation	Mrs. Renolds	
2009	Not Evelyn Cho	Sarah	Short
2009	Just Before Dark	Danielle	Short
2010	The Bannen Way	Nurse	
2010	A Date with Diana	Cheetah (voice)	Short
2011	Beverly Hills Chihuahua 2	Rachel Ashe	Video
2011	Demoted	Amy	
2011	6 Month Rule	Missy	
2011	Storm War	Samantha Winters	
2012	Blue Eyed Butcher	Jessica Wright	TV movie
2012	Sweet Old World	Eva	
2012	The Ventriloquist	Stephanie	Short
2012	Beverly Hills Chihuahua 3: Viva la Fiesta!	Rachel Ashe	Video
2013	Skinwalker Ranch	Lisa	
2013	Ladies Night Singles	Jessica	Short
2014	Delirium	Rachel Haloway	TV movie
2014	108 Stitches	Caitlin DeShields	
2015	Wingman Inc.	Kristy	
2016	Cut to the Chase	Isobel Chase	
2016	The Order	Aki	Short
2016	The Watcher	Emma	
2016	Sleigh Bells Ring	Laurel Bishop	TV movie
2017	Nanny Seduction	Vanessa	TV movie
2017	Resident Evil: Vendetta	Rebecca Chambers (voice)	
2017	Hush Little Baby	Lauren	TV movie
2018	Muse	Amanda Jennings	TV movie
2018	Last Vermont Christmas	Megan Gaper	TV movie
2018	Hometown Christmas	Jen	TV movie
2019	Christmas on the Range	Kendall Riley	TV movie
2019	Love, Fall & Order	Claire Hart	TV movie
2019	Random Acts of Christmas	Sydney	TV movie
2020	The Secret Ingredient	Kelly McIntire	TV movie
2020	A Timeless Christmas	Megan Turner	TV movie
2021	Church People	Carla Finney	
2021	Mystery 101: Killer Timing	Kate Colson	TV movie
2021	Love Stories in Sunflower Valley	Kate	TV movie
2021	Love on the Road	Abby Brooks	TV movie
2021	Every Time A Bell Rings	Charlotte Daniels	TV movie
2022	Loren & Rose	Denise	
2022	It Snows All the Time	Marilyn	
2022	Christmas Bedtime Stories	Danielle Aames	TV movie
2023	A Taste of Love	Taylor	TV movie
2023	Hearts of the Game	Hazel	TV movie
2023	Resident Evil: Death Island	Rebecca Chambers (voice)	
2023	Christmas on Cherry Lane	Lizzie Hamilton	TV movie
2024	Autumn at Apple Hill	Elise	TV movie
2024	The Christmas Quest	Joan Hamilton	TV movie
2024	Deck the Halls on Cherry Lane	Lizzie Hamilton	TV movie
2025	Journey to You	Monica	TV movie

=== Television ===
Year	Title	Role	Notes
2001	Power Rangers Time Force	Jen Scotts/Pink Time Force Ranger	Main Cast
2002	Power Rangers Wild Force	Jen Scotts/Pink Time Force Ranger	Episode: "Reinforcements from the Future, Parts 1 & 2"
2003	Crossing Jordan	Tyler	Episode: "Sunset Division"
2004	MDN	Herself/Host	Main Host
2005	American Dreams	Hippie Girl	Episode: "California Dreamin'"
2006	Free Ride	Amber Danwood	Main Cast
2007	On the Lot	Herself	Main Cast
2007	Cold Case	Francis Stone	Episode: "Torn"
2007	CSI: Miami	Rachel Hemming	Episode: "Miami Confidential"
2008	Supernatural	Elizabeth	Episode: "Malleus Maleficarum"
2008	Greek	Trish	Episode: "Barely Legal"
2008	Without a Trace	Brook Simms	Episode: "Better Angels"
2008	How I Met Your Mother	Heather Mosby	Episode: "Little Minnesota"
2008	The Ex List	-	Episode: "Trustafarian"
2009	Crappy Holidays Presents...	Herself	Episode: "Crappy St. Patrick's Day"
2009	Grey's Anatomy	Meg Shelley	Episode: "I Will Follow You Into the Dark"
2009	General Hospital	Cassandra	Recurring Cast
2009	Monk	Callie Esterhaus	Episode: "Mr. Monk and the Critic"
2009	NCIS	Navy Lieutenant Jessica Summers	Episode: "The Inside Man"
2009	The Mentalist	Donna Hines	Episode: "Black Gold and Red Blood"
2009-10	Saving Grace	Kendra Burke	Recurring Cast: Season 3
2010	CSI: NY	Agent Pangle	Episode: "Pot of Gold"
2010	Ghost Whisperer	Kelly Ferguson	Episode: "Lethal Combination"
2010	Castle	Cecily Burkett	Episode: "Food to Die For"
2010	House	Margaret McPherson	Episode: "Massage Therapy"
2010	LA I.C.E.	Officer Julia McCall	Episode: "The Mix Tape"
2011	Law & Order: LA	Annette Kay	Episode: "Silver Lake"
2011	Chase	Caroline Belkin	Episode: "Seven Years"
2011	Necessary Roughness	Meredith Page	Episode: "Anchor Management"
2012	Chuck	Bobbi	Episode: "Chuck versus the Bullet Train"
2013	Body of Proof	Charlotte Tilney	Episode: "Abducted: Part 1"
2013	Red Widow	Felicity	Recurring Cast
2013	Sleepy Hollow	Lena Gilbert	Episode: "Sanctuary"
2014	Garfunkel and Oates	Jenny	Episode: "Hair Swap"
2014	NCIS: Los Angeles	FBI Special Agent Carole Gordon	Episode: "SEAL Hunter"
2015	Bones	Ashleigh Smith	Episode: "The Carpals in the Coy-Wolves"
2016	Angel from Hell	Danielle	Episodes: "The Flask"
2017	Stitchers	Stephanie Fisher	Recurring Cast: Season 3
2018	The 5th Quarter	-	Episode: "Gascar"
2018	9-1-1	Tammy	Episode: "Worst Day Ever"
2018	Criminal Minds	Mrs. Wilson	Episode: "The Capilanos"
2019	L.A.'s Finest	Claire Smith	Episode: "Pilot"
2024	Blue Ridge	Beth Yates	Recurring Cast
2024	Holidazed	Nora Jacobs	Main Cast
2024	Finding Mr. Christmas	Herself/Guest Judge	Episode: "The Hunt For Mr. Christmas"

=== Video games ===
Year	Title	Role
2001	Power Rangers Time Force	Pink Ranger (voice)
2001	James Bond 007: Agent Under Fire	Carla the Jackal (voice)
2003	Lifeline	Naomi (voice)
2003	Nightshade	Hisui/Countdown Warning (voice)
2003	Whiplash	Carol Ann (voice)
2004	Puyo Pop Fever	Additional Voices
2004	Kuon	Additional Voices
2004	Dororo	Misaki (voice)
2004	EyeToy: AntiGrav	Additional Voices
2006	Raw Danger!	Additional Voices
2006	Phantasy Star Universe	Karen Erra (voice)
2007	Shining Force EXA	Cyrille (voice)
2007	Brooktown High	Additional Voices
2009	Phantasy Star Portable 2	Additional Voices
2010	Deadly Premonition	Various Roles (voice)
2010	CSI: Fatal Conspiracy	Jayne Barrett (voice)
2011	Star Wars: The Old Republic	Various Roles (voice)
2012	Call of Duty: Black Ops II	Chloe "Karma" Lynch (voice and motion capture)
2020	Maneater	Hunter 03 Female (voice)
2025	Call of Duty: Black Ops 7	Chloe "Karma" Lynch (voice)
