= Resident Evil Zero =

2002 video game

- North American cover art featuring Rebecca Chambers and Billy Coen
- Developer: Capcom Production Studio 3 (Note: With assistance from Tose)
- Publisher: Capcom
- Director: Koji Oda
- Producer: Tatsuya Minami
- Programmer: Yoshifumi Hirao
- Writers: Noboru Sugimura; Hiromichi Nakamoto; Junichi Miyashita
- Composer: Seiko Kobuchi
- Series: Resident Evil
- Engine: MT Framework (HD remaster)
- Platforms: GameCube; Wii; PlayStation 3; PlayStation 4; Windows; Xbox 360; Xbox One; Nintendo Switch
- Release: November 12, 2002: GameCube; NA: November 12, 2002; JP: November 21, 2002; AU: February 28, 2003; EU: March 7, 2003 Archives: Resident Evil Zero Wii; JP: July 10, 2008; NA: December 1, 2009; AU: January 21, 2010; EU: January 22, 2010 Remaster PS3, PS4, Windows, Xbox 360, Xbox One; WW: January 19, 2016 (digital); JP: January 21, 2016; WW: January 22, 2016 (retail) Nintendo Switch; WW: May 21, 2019 (digital); JP: May 23, 2019 (digital) Origins Collection Nintendo Switch; WW: May 21, 2019 (retail)
- Genre: Survival horror
- Mode: Single-player

Resident Evil Zero (or Resident Evil 0) (Note: The game has been referred to officially in both styles. It is known in Japan as Biohazard Zero or Biohazard 0 (Japanese: バイオハザード0, Hepburn: Baiohazādo Zero), and stylized as biohazard 0. The Japanese version has the title spelled entirely in lowercase letters, as opposed to the uppercase style used in the prior games.) is a 2002 survival horror game developed and published by Capcom for the GameCube. It is a prequel to Resident Evil (2002), following S.T.A.R.S. officer Rebecca Chambers and convict Billy Coen as they explore an abandoned training facility for employees of the pharmaceutical company Umbrella in the outskirts of Raccoon City. The gameplay is similar to other Resident Evil games, but adds the ability to switch between characters to solve puzzles and use unique abilities.

Development for Resident Evil Zero began for the Nintendo 64 in 1998. The partner system was created to take advantage of the short load times possible with the capabilities of the Nintendo 64 Game Pak. The cartridge format also provided limitations, as the storage capacity was significantly less than that of a CD-ROM. The team had to approach the design differently from previous series entries to conserve storage space. Resident Evil Zero was designed to be more difficult than previous Resident Evil games. Inspired by Sweet Home (1989), the team removed the item storage boxes present in earlier games and introduced a new item-dropping feature. Production was switched to the recently unveiled GameCube after development slowed due to memory storage issues. Only the concept and story remained from the original game, which had to be rebuilt.

Resident Evil Zero received generally positive reviews from critics, who praised the graphics and audio for building a haunting atmosphere. Opinions on the new partner and item systems were mixed. Some found the changes were an improvement and added new layers of strategy; others believed the changes were cumbersome or non-innovative. The game's tank controls were criticized as outdated.

The game was ported to the Wii in 2008, and a high-definition remaster was released in January 2016; the rereleases received mixed reviews due to lack of improvements. Resident Evil Zero was commercially successful, having sold over 4 million copies across all platforms.

== Gameplay ==
The player guides Rebecca away from a zombie which has just emerged from a refrigerator. Meanwhile, the AI-controlled Billy takes aim at the enemy.

Resident Evil Zero is a third-person survival horror video game. The gameplay remains largely the same as previous entries in the series. However, unlike controlling one sole character like the previous games, the player controls two protagonists throughout the game. The player may switch between police officer and medic Rebecca Chambers and convicted former Force Reconnaissance Officer Billy Coen. If they travel together, either one of them can be controlled while the other character is handled by the game's artificial intelligence (AI). The player may also control both simultaneously or split them up to explore areas separately. Each character has unique abilities. Rebecca has a mixing kit which allows her to combine herbs and other chemicals, but she is weak defensively. In contrast, Billy can move heavy objects, use a lighter, and has higher defense, but cannot mix herbs (a staple ability in Resident Evil games). The partner system is central to solving many of the game's puzzles.

The characters can run as well as perform quick 180-degree turns to evade danger. The player may examine objects such as doors, other characters, and items in order to find clues to proceed through the game. Some objects can be pushed or climbed upon to investigate higher levels. Items held by the characters can be examined in the inventory screen. Some items such as weapons can be equipped, and other items can be combined to create more effective items or replenish ammunition. When Rebecca and Billy are close by, they can exchange items between one-another. Previous series installments had the player store items in boxes placed in fixed locations. Resident Evil Zero has no item boxes, and instead allows players to drop items on the floor, freeing space in the inventory momentarily until they are retrieved at a later point. The locations of dropped items are displayed on the game map. The number of items that can be dropped in a room is limited.

== Plot ==
On July 23, 1998, a train owned by the pharmaceutical company Umbrella, the Ecliptic Express, comes under attack from a swarm of leeches. As the passengers and crew are attacked, a mysterious young man watches from a hillside. Two hours later, the Bravo Team of the Special Tactics And Rescue Service (S.T.A.R.S.), a tactical unit of Raccoon City Police Department's (R.P.D.), is sent to investigate a series of cannibalistic murders in the Arklay Mountains outside of Raccoon City. On the way to the scene, its helicopter has an engine failure and crash-lands in a forest. Searching the area, officer Rebecca Chambers of Bravo Team comes across the Express, now motionless. She begins to investigate the scene, only to find the passengers and crew transformed into zombies. She is unaware their transformation is a result of exposure to Umbrella's T-virus contained within the leeches. As she explores the train, she teams up with Billy Coen—a former Marine Force Reconnaissance officer, who was to be executed for killing 23 people until the military police van transporting him crashed in the region.

The pair notices the mysterious young man, moments before the train suddenly begins moving again. Unbeknownst to the pair, two soldiers from Umbrella, on the orders of Albert Wesker and William Birkin, attempt to take control of the train and destroy it, but are killed by leeches before they can complete their mission. As the train speeds out of control, Rebecca and Billy apply the brakes and avert its course towards an abandoned training facility for future executives of Umbrella. They discover that the former director of the facility and the corporation's co-founder, Dr. James Marcus, was responsible for discovering the so-called Progenitor virus in the 1960s, and decided to examine its potential as a biological weapon. He combined it with leech DNA to develop the T-virus that causes rapid mutations in living organisms and thus transforms humans and animals into zombies and monsters.

As the pair continue to explore the facility, Wesker decides to leave Umbrella and join its rival company, and makes plans for further research on the T-virus. William Birkin refuses his offer to join him, instead opting to complete his research on the G-virus. Later, Rebecca becomes separated from Billy. On her own, she encounters Captain Enrico Marini, who tells her that the rest of the Bravo team will meet up at an old mansion they found, but allows her to stay behind to find Billy. Just after Enrico leaves, Rebecca is attacked by the Tyrant. After temporarily defeating the Tyrant, Rebecca meets up with Billy again and, together, they defeat it and continue on towards a water plant.

Eventually, Rebecca and Billy catch up with the leech-controlling man, who happens to be Marcus' final experiment, the Queen Leech. In 1988, Marcus was assassinated on the orders of Umbrella's other co-founder, Oswell E. Spencer, who sought his research. After his corpse was dumped, the Queen Leech entered his body and reanimated it, gaining his memories and the ability to shapeshift, thus believing itself to be the resurrected Marcus and orchestrated the T-virus outbreak in the facility and on the train as a means of revenge against Umbrella. After temporarily defeating it, Billy and Rebecca attempt to escape to the surface via a lift, just as William Birkin trips the facility's self-destruct mechanism. Pursued by the Queen Leech, the pair eventually kill it and escape before the facility is destroyed. Following their escape, Rebecca notices the mansion that Marini mentioned and prepares to head for it. Before she does, she assures Billy that her police report will list him as another casualty of the incident. Thanking her for his freedom, Billy departs as Rebecca heads towards the mansion to seek out the whereabouts of her fellow Bravo Team members, setting the stage for the events of Resident Evil.

== Development ==
Top to bottom: The Nintendo 64 prototype (2000), original GameCube release (2002), and high-definition remaster (2016). In each scene, Rebecca can be seen taking aim at an enemy during the opening train scenario.

While the original Resident Evil (1996) was still in development, the idea for a prequel came up shortly after the 64DD peripheral for the Nintendo 64 was announced in 1995. Following the 64DD's low sales four years later, Capcom developed Resident Evil Zero as a cartridge-based Nintendo 64 game. Capcom started development on the Nintendo 64 version in mid-1998, one of many Resident Evil games being developed at the time. One of these was Resident Evil – Code: Veronica (2000) which was taking full advantage of the capacities of the GD-ROM format. The Nintendo 64 cartridge could only store 64MB of data, one tenth that of a traditional CD-ROM. For these reasons, the team approached Resident Evil Zero with different ideas for gameplay and visual design that would function better with less storage space. After the script had been completed in early 1999, the production of a Resident Evil game for Nintendo 64 was revealed to the public by Yoshiki Okamoto, the president of Capcom's screenplay company Flagship.

Resident Evil Zero was designed to be more difficult than its predecessors, removing the item boxes to make the game more like Sweet Home (1989). The real-time "partner zapping" system was designed to take advantage of the console's unique features and strengths, namely the lack of load times, which are necessary for optical disc-based gameplay as with the PlayStation. In an effort to make 1-on-1 zombie fights more intense, Capcom experimented with giving the zombies different reactions when they were shot and allowing the player to counter-attack when bitten. The team also toyed with faster zombies, a precursor to Resident Evil's crimson head enemies. The prototype also supported local co-operative play. Resident Evil Zero was officially announced at 20 percent completion in January 2000, after which it was presented with a playable demo at Tokyo Game Show. The game was expected to be released in July 2000 and reportedly had an atmosphere close to the first Resident Evil, focusing more on suspense than the more action-oriented gameplay of Resident Evil 2 (1998). However, development began to slow down when it became apparent that the data for Resident Evil Zero would not fit on a single cartridge.

Production shifted to the newly announced GameCube, with the concept and story carried over but all of the data recreated. The platform change was confirmed in September 2000. The game's final version was developed primarily by Capcom Production Studio 3 with additional support provided by Tose. As a result of the transition to the GameCube, it was delayed so that the environments could be upgraded visually. More CGI videos were created as a result of the increased memory capacities, and the voice acting was re-recorded. The iconic sounds of the leeches were actually from recordings of cooking hamburgers. For the gun models, the modelling team was provided realistic-looking airsoft guns to base their designs from. Their designs were so close to the source material that the models, at first, featured replica markings and gas refill inlets. No one on the team noticed until half-way through development. Scenario writer Noboru Sugimura was called back to make some changes to the story. In the prototype's story, either Rebecca or Billy could die with the other character surviving and completing the game. This idea was scrapped as Rebecca dying would ruin the canon of the Resident Evil timeline. Billy was also originally designed in the prototype as a more ambiguous character, possibly becoming friend or foe as the story progressed. This idea was scrapped. The character designs were also adjusted: Rebecca for example lost her beret and shoulder pads while Billy received a new hairstyle. The GameCube's use of optical discs reintroduced load times, so the programmers had to use sophisticated programming to make the "partner zapping" system work. Capcom announced its intention to release a game demo in Japan around August 2002.

== Release ==
Resident Evil Zero was released for the Nintendo GameCube on November 12, 2002, in North America, on November 21, 2002, in Japan and March 7, 2003, in Europe. In December 2008, the game was ported to the Wii along with Resident Evil (2002). The port, Resident Evil Archives: Resident Evil Zero, is near-identical but features a control system that supports the Wii Remote and the GameCube controller. For many years, the fate of the original Nintendo 64 prototype remained unclear. All that remained was low-quality video captured from the Tokyo Game Show in 2000 and magazine scans. In 2015, Capcom showed off the prototype while marketing the remaster and demonstrated new high-quality footage of it. The prototype remains unreleased to the public.

=== HD Remaster ===
On May 26, 2015, Capcom announced that a high-definition remastered version of the game was in development, Resident Evil Zero HD Remaster. The success of the high-definition remaster of Resident Evil inspired producer Tsukasa Takenaka to provide the same treatment to that game's prequel. Takenaka recognized that many Resident Evil fans preferred the old style of gameplay pre-Resident Evil 4, and so he reasoned that the HD remasters were to provide that same gameplay experience on modern hardware. The remaster was produced by Tsukasa Takenaka and the team was made up of many members from the original team, including director Koji Oda. Takenaka was glad Oda was on board, as this ensured Oda's original vision of the game would not be tarnished. Resident Evil Zero HD Remaster was released on January 19, 2016. A retail compilation called Resident Evil Origins Collection that includes Resident Evil HD Remaster and Resident Evil Zero HD Remaster was released on January 22, 2016. The game was released for the Nintendo Switch on May 21, 2019, along with Resident Evil and Resident Evil 4.

For the remaster, Capcom used the original 2002 models and textures from their archives. To Takenaka's surprise, the models and textures were actually designed in a very high quality and then downscaled for the original release. This meant that some assets had to be redone, as items that were intentionally blurry or illegible in the original were now much more clear and did not make sense in context, such as posters or signs in the environment. The models and textures were re-touched, and then the backgrounds were re-captured. Some backgrounds in the original also featured video effects such as fire. In the remaster, these videos were transitioned into 3D effects. Additional modes were added as well, including an easy mode and Wesker mode. In Wesker mode, the player controls Albert Wesker instead of Billy, and can move quickly and use special attacks. Other improvements include an upgrade to 5.1 surround sound, video options for both the original 4:3 ratio or a new 16:9 option, as well as more control styles including a modern non-tank-like control scheme. Overall, Takenaka felt that putting together the remaster for Resident Evil Zero was more difficult than that of Resident Evil, largely due to the companion function.

== Reception ==
Reception (GameCube)

Aggregate score
Aggregator	Score
Metacritic	83/100

Review scores
Publication	Score
1Up.com	B+
Electronic Gaming Monthly	8/10, 8/10, 9/10
Eurogamer	8/10
Famitsu	10/10, 9/10, 9/10, 10/10
Game Informer	9.3/10
GamePro	4.5/5
GameRevolution	B
GameSpot	8.0/10
GameSpy	4/5
GameZone	9.3/10
IGN	8.2/10

Resident Evil Zero received generally positive reviews after its initial GameCube release in 2002. The graphics and atmosphere were universally praised, being described as "wonderfully spooky" and "moody" with an "astonishing level of detail". Scott Steinberg of GameSpy noted how the animated backgrounds, such as flickering lights and dripping water, brought the environments to life. Giancarlo Varanini of GameSpot shared these sentiments, and complimented Capcom on how they were able to blend the game's models with pre-rendered backgrounds to create highly detailed visuals. The sound design was also complimented, with Matt Casamassina of IGN noting that "Capcom uses silence at times, too, to scare, which is brilliant." Varanini described the soundtrack as one "that will keep you in constant fear." Louis Bedigian of GameZone praised the sound effect work, such as thunder, gunshots, and footsteps for building a scary environment. The controls were universally panned as archaic, and the series was criticized for not evolving the control scheme to something more similar to Devil May Cry (2001) or Eternal Darkness (2002).

Critics had mixed reactions to the gameplay changes from previous series entries. Regarding the new item system, a critic from GameRevolution noted that it prevents the need to return to item boxes to empty inventory. However, he also noted a drawback, in that it introduces more backtracking to pick up an item that was dropped. Contrary to this, Mark MacDonald of 1UP.com praised it for eliminating the backtracking that slowed down previous series entries. Varanini from GameSpot gave credit to Capcom for attempting a new item system, but it is ultimately not too useful since it is easiest to drop all the items in a save location anyway. Casamassina of IGN called the system "perfect" and much better than the item boxes in previous games. Regarding the partner system, Varanini said that it works well, although he found the puzzles too simple and the companion's AI was lacking at times. Bedigian of GameZone praised the companion system for adding a new dimension to the Resident Evil series and it left him excited for future games. Steinberg of GameSpy liked the puzzles which required both characters working together, but he was not keen to fight alongside them, feeling like he was "babysitting" the other character due to weak AI.

Re-releases of Resident Evil Zero have received considerably less praise than the original, receiving mixed or average reviews. The Wii release was criticized for being a near-identical port of the GameCube version and for not fully using the Wii Remote's motion control capabilities, instead relying largely on the Classic Controller and remote/nunchuk combo. For the high-definition remaster, critics were impressed by the improved visuals but ultimately felt the game inherited the problems of the original. Peter Brown of GameSpot highlighted Wesker Mode as a fun addition and noted the game still "bears the hallmarks that made the original Resident Evil enjoyable."

Resident Evil Zero sold 1.25 million copies on the GameCube, and the high-definition remaster has sold 2.8 million units as of December 2020. The game was novelized into the book Resident Evil: Zero Hour by S. D. Perry and published by Pocket Books on October 24, 2004.

=== Awards ===
Resident Evil Zero was nominated for GameSpot's annual "Best Action Adventure Game", "Best Sound", "Best Story", "Best Graphics (Technical)", and "Best Graphics (Artistic)" awards among GameCube games.

== Legacy ==
An unofficial "demake" was created in 2023 by fans. The game is a mod of Resident Evil 2 for the PlayStation, and only features the first section of the game.
