= Marcus Coloma =

American actor

Marcus Coloma (born October 18, 1978) is an American actor. He has appeared in multiple TV series and the Hilary Duff film Material Girls. From 2019 to 2023, Coloma portrayed Nikolas Cassadine on the American daytime soap opera General Hospital.

== Early life ==
Coloma was born in Middletown, California.

== Career ==
In 2005, Coloma starred in Fox's Point Pleasant as Father Tomas, and played Matt Evans in South Beach in 2006. He has appeared on several television series, including playing Marcus Johnson on The CW drama One Tree Hill in 2006, and portraying Leo Cruz on the ABC Family show, Make It or Break It from 2009 to 2010. Coloma played Father Jonas Alcaraz on Major Crimes in 2017, and portrayed Clark Steedler in False Profits in 2018. He joined scientology in 2005 according to publications on the Scientology website(13)

Coloma played Hilary Duff's love interest in the 2006 film Material Girls. He starred in the Disney films Beverly Hills Chihuahua 2 (2011) and Beverly Hills Chihuahua 3 (2012) as Sam. In 2019, he joined the cast of General Hospital in the role of Nikolas Cassadine, playing the role through early 2023.

== Filmography ==
Film roles
Year	Title	Role	Notes
2006	Material Girls	Rick	
2011	Beverly Hills Chihuahua 2	Sam Cortez	Direct-to-video film
2012	Beverly Hills Chihuahua 3: Viva La Fiesta!	Sam Cortez	Direct-to-video film
2013	Syrup	Jim the Marketer	

Television roles
Year	Title	Role	Notes
1999	Undressed	Charlie	[unknown episodes]
2001	Go Fish	Spence	Episode: “Go Wrestling”
2001	All About Us	Sean	Recurring role, 5 episodes
2002	So Little Time	Car Thief	Episode: “The Flat Tire”
2003	Strong Medicine	Caesar	Episode: “Blocked Lines”
2003	JAG	Petty Officer Matthew Cantrell	Episode: “Heart and Soul”
2003	Threat Matrix	Checkout Clerk	Episode: “Under the Gun”
2005	Point Pleasant	Father Thomas	Recurring role, 6 episodes
2006	South Beach	Matt Evans	Main role
2006	One Tree Hill	Marcus Johnson	2 episodes
2006	CSI: Miami	Luke Baylor	Episode: “High Octane”
2008	Lincoln Heights	Danny Marinero	2 episodes
2009–2010	Make It or Break It	Leo Cruz	Recurring role (seasons 1–2), 6 episodes
2010	CSI: Crime Scene Investigation	Bingo Mathers	Episode: “Take My Life, Please”
2011	Psycho Girlfriend	Noah	Web series; 3 episodes
2011	The Online Gamer	Shady Guy	Web series; 2 episodes
2012	Emily Owens M.D.	Officer Rick Malone	Episode: “Emily and... the Tell-Tale Heart”
2013	Drop Dead Diva	Robert Medina	Episode: "50 Shades of Grayson”
2013	The Mentalist	Roberto Salas	Episode: “Wedding in Red”
2015	Heart of the Matter	Ben	Television film; also known as Portrait of Love
2017	Lucifer	Hector Ruiz	Episode: “The Good, the Bad, and the Crispy”
2017	Major Crimes	Father Jonas Alcaraz	4 episodes (season 6)
2018	False Profits	Clark	Unsold TV pilot
2019	Adam & Eve	Carlos / Chad	Unsold TV pilot
2019–2023	General Hospital	Nikolas Cassadine	Main role

Video game roles
Year	Title	Role	Notes
2007	Call of Duty 4: Modern Warfare	N/A	Voice role
2008	Command & Conquer 3: Kane's Wish	N/A	Voice role
