= Odette Annable =

American actress (born 1985)

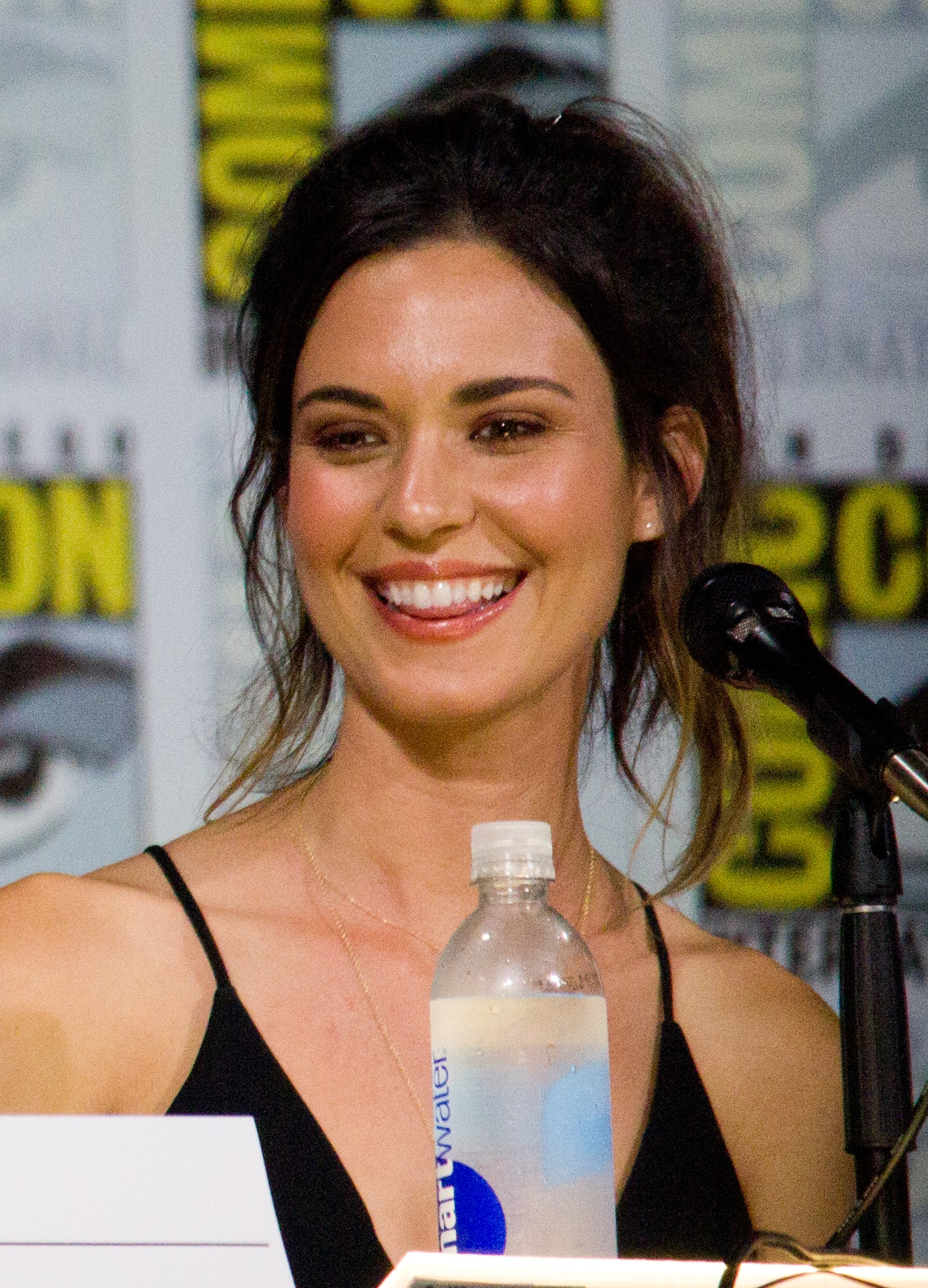
- Annable in 2017
- Born: Odette Juliette Yustman; May 10, 1985 (age 41); Los Angeles County, California, U.S.
- Occupation: Actress
- Years active: 1990–present
- Spouse: Dave Annable (m. 2010)
- Children: 2

Odette Juliette Annable (née Yustman; born May 10, 1985) is an American actress. She is known for various roles in film and television, including as Dr. Jessica Adams in the Fox medical drama series House, Beth McIntyre in the monster film Cloverfield, Aubrey Diaz in the ABC drama series October Road, Samantha Arias / Reign in Supergirl, and Nola Longshadow in Banshee.

== Early life ==
Odette Juliette Yustman was born on May 10, 1985, in Los Angeles County, California, to a Colombian father and a Cuban mother. Her father is of French, Italian, and Swiss descent. Annable grew up near Palm Springs. Her first language is Spanish and she did not learn to speak English until she was five. Annable graduated from Woodcrest Christian High School in Riverside. She lived for a time with her friend and sex trafficking survivor, Neyla Miller.

== Career ==
Annable played Spanish-speaking student Rosa in Kindergarten Cop at age 5. She later starred in the TV series South Beach and October Road. She had a lead role in the 2007 Lifetime film Reckless Behavior: Caught on Tape, and Cloverfield, as well as an appearance in the comedy film Walk Hard, and the 2009 film The Unborn.

In 2011, she played nurse Annie Miller in season five of Brothers & Sisters. Annable played Melanie Garcia on the comedy Breaking In as a series regular in its first season, appearing as a guest star thereafter. She joined the TV series House as Dr. Jessica Adams, and remained on the show until the finale in May 2012.

In March 2014, Annable was cast as Trudy Cooper in the ABC series The Astronaut Wives Club.

In 2017, she joined the main cast of the CW series Supergirl as Samantha Arias, a single mother who discovers that she shares origins with Supergirl and Superman, as well as Reign, the Kryptonian Worldkiller she was engineered to be. From 2021, she joined Walker as Geraldine Broussard, a friend of the Walker's and local barkeep.

== Personal life ==
She was engaged to actor Trevor Wright until their breakup in 2008. She married her Brothers & Sisters co-star Dave Annable in October 2010. They have two daughters. In October 2019, the couple announced their separation, but announced their reconciliation in August 2020.

Annable endorsed Hillary Clinton in the 2016 United States presidential election.

== Filmography ==
=== Film ===
Year	Title	Role	Notes
1990	Kindergarten Cop	Rosa	as Odette Yustman
1996	Dear God	Angela	as Odette Yustman
2006	The Holiday	Kissing Girl	as Odette Yustman
2007	Transformers	Socialite Girl	as Odette Yustman
2007	Walk Hard: The Dewey Cox Story	Reefer Girl	as Odette Yustman
2008	Cloverfield	Elizabeth "Beth" McIntyre	as Odette Yustman
2009	The Unborn	Casey Beldon	as Odette Yustman
2010	Operation: Endgame	Temperance	as Odette Yustman
2010	Group Sex	Vanessa	Direct-to-video; as Odette Yustman
2010	And Soon the Darkness	Ellie	as Odette Yustman
2010	You Again	Joanna Clark	as Odette Yustman
2011	Grow Up Already	Winnie	Short film
2011	The Double	Natalie Geary	as Odette Yustman
2011	Beverly Hills Chihuahua 2	Chloe Winthrop Ashe-Cortez	Voice role; direct-to-video, as Odette Yustman
2012	Beverly Hills Chihuahua 3: Viva la Fiesta!	Chloe Winthrop Ashe-Cortez	Voice role; direct-to-video
2015	The Truth About Lies	Rachel Stone	
2018	The Chair	Brooke	Short film
2019	The Cloverfield Files	Elizabeth "Beth" McIntyre	Archival footage
2025	Due West	Mindy	
2025	Under Fire	Agent Vasquez	

=== Television ===
Year	Title	Role	Notes
1996	Remembrance	Charlotte	Television film; as Odette Yustman
2004	Quintuplets	Kelly Helberg	Episode: "(Disdainfully) the Helbergs", as Odette Yustman
2005	Entourage	XBox Model	Episode: "(Chinatown)"
2006	South Beach	Arielle Casta	Main role; 8 episodes, as Odette Yustman
2006	Monk	Courtney	Episode: "Mr. Monk, Private Eye", as Odette Yustman
2007	Reckless Behavior: Caught on Tape	Emma Norman	Television film; as Odette Yustman
2007–2008	October Road	Aubrey Diaz	Main role; 19 episodes, as Odette Yustman
2008	Life on Mars	Adrienne	Episode: "Have You Seen Your Mother, Baby, Standing in the Shadows?"; as Odette Yustman
2010–2011	Brothers & Sisters	Annie	Recurring role; 5 episodes, as Odette Yustman
2011–2012	Breaking In	Melanie Garcia	Main role (Season 1), Guest role (Season 2); 12 episodes
2011–2012	House	Dr. Jessica Adams	Main role (Season 8); 21 episodes
2013	Golden Boy	Ada O'Connor	Recurring role; 2 episodes
2013	New Girl	Shane	Episode: "Quick Hardening Caulk"
2013	Westside	Sophie Nance	Unaired television pilot
2013	Anger Management	Jamie	Episode: "Charlie and Lacey Shack Up"
2013–2015	Banshee	Nola Longshadow	Recurring role; 11 episodes
2014	Two and a Half Men	Nicole	Guest role; 3 episodes
2014	Rush	Sarah	Recurring role; 5 episodes
2015	The Astronaut Wives Club	Trudy Cooper	Main role; 10 episodes
2015	The Grinder	Devin Stutz	Recurring role; 3 episodes
2016–2017	Pure Genius	Dr. Zoe Brockett	Main role; 13 episodes
2017–2018, 2020	Supergirl	Samantha Arias / Reign	Main cast (season 3), Guest role (season 5); 24 episodes Nominated – Saturn Award for Best Supporting Actress on Television
2017–2018	Elena of Avalor	Senorita Marisol	Episodes: "Crystal in the Rough" and "Science Unfair"; voice role
2018	No Sleep 'Til Christmas	Lizzie	Television film
2019	Adam & Eve	Eve	Unaired television pilot
2019–2020	Tell Me a Story	Madelyn "Maddie" Pruitt	Main role (Season 2); 10 episodes
2020	Thirtysomething(else)	Janey Steadman	Unsold television pilot
2021	Fantasy Island	Daphne Madden	Episode: "His and Hers/The Heartbreak Hotel"
2021–2024	Walker	Geraldine "Geri" Broussard	Recurring role (season 1); Main role (seasons 2–4); 60 episodes
2026	Kentucky Roses	Sadie	Television film

=== Music videos ===
Year	Title	Role	Artist
2009	"(If You're Wondering If I Want You To) I Want You To"	Lady	Weezer

=== Video game ===
Year	Title	Voice role	Notes
2008	Fallout 3	Amata Almodovar	Voice role; as Odette Yustman
