= Jeffrey Bushell =

American screenwriter

Jeffrey Bushell is an American screenwriter who has written for The Bernie Mac Show, Drawn Together, MADtv, What I Like About You, and Zoey 101. He created and wrote the film Beverly Hills Chihuahua which was inspired by his dog, Maggie. Bushell won the Peabody Award and the Television Critics Award for his work on The Bernie Mac Show.

He is a graduate of Middlebury College where he won the Stolley Ryan award for top American literature student.

He also co-created the Nickelodeon sitcom, Marvin Marvin, which premiered on November 24, 2012.
