= List of Star Fox video games =

Star Fox's logo since 2026

The Star Fox video game series is a franchise of rail shooters and other action-adventure games published and produced by Nintendo. The games have been developed by a variety of developers, but all of the games have had input from Nintendo. All Star Fox video games have been developed exclusively for Nintendo video game consoles and handhelds dating from the Super Nintendo Entertainment System to the current generation of video game consoles. The series debuted in Japan on February 21, 1993, with Star Fox, (Note: Japanese: スターフォックス, Hepburn: Sutā Fokkusu) which was later released in North America and Europe, being renamed in Europe to Starwing. The series revolves around the Star Fox team, a group of mercenaries hired to protect the Lylat system. The leader of the group, Fox McCloud, is the protagonist of the series, and the only playable character in most of the games. Currently, the series contains nine games. One reason the Star Fox series has remained popular is because of the shoot 'em up aerial sequences found in many of the games, which are recognized as the series' high points. Dylan Cuthbert, one of the original creators of the series, noted that it was the combination of the on-rails aerial action and the in-game universe that made the games successful.

== Video games ==
=== Main series ===
Game	Details
Star Fox Original release date(s): JP: February 21, 1993; NA: March 1, 1993; PAL: June 3, 1993	Release years by system: 1993 – Super Nintendo Entertainment System; 2019 – Nintendo Switch Online
Star Fox Original release date(s): JP: February 21, 1993; NA: March 1, 1993; PAL: June 3, 1993	Notes: Known in Europe as Starwing.; Star Fox was developed by Nintendo EAD and programmed by Argonaut Games, who created the Super FX chip to enable the 3D graphics seen in the game.; A limited edition version entitled Star Fox: Super Weekend was created for competition events hosted by Nintendo Power in North America and Europe. The cartridge held modified versions of two stages and included a bonus stage. Around two thousand cartridges were estimated to be made.
Star Fox 64 Original release date(s): JP: April 27, 1997; NA: July 1, 1997; PAL: October 20, 1997	Release years by system: 1997 – Nintendo 64; 2003 – iQue Player; 2007 – Wii Virtual Console; 2017 – Wii U Virtual Console; 2021 – Nintendo Switch Online
Star Fox 64 Original release date(s): JP: April 27, 1997; NA: July 1, 1997; PAL: October 20, 1997	Notes: Known in Europe as Lylat Wars.; Developed by Nintendo EAD.; Star Fox 64 was the first game to feature support for the Rumble Pak peripheral, and early copies of the game shipped with the Rumble Pak in a bundle.
Star Fox Adventures Original release date(s): NA: September 22, 2002; JP: September 27, 2002; PAL: November 22, 2002	Release years by system: 2002 – GameCube
Star Fox Adventures Original release date(s): NA: September 22, 2002; JP: September 27, 2002; PAL: November 22, 2002	Notes: The last game developed by second-party Nintendo developer Rare before its acquisition by Microsoft.; Star Fox Adventures differed from the other games of the Star Fox series by being an action-adventure game in the vein of The Legend of Zelda series instead of an on-rail shooter.
Star Fox: Assault Original release date(s): NA: February 14, 2005; JP: February 24, 2005; EU: April 29, 2005	Release years by system: 2005 – GameCube
Star Fox: Assault Original release date(s): NA: February 14, 2005; JP: February 24, 2005; EU: April 29, 2005	Notes: Developed by Namco.
Star Fox Command Original release date(s): JP: August 3, 2006; NA: August 28, 2006; AU: September 21, 2006; EU: January 26, 2007	Release years by system: 2006 – Nintendo DS; 2015 – Wii U Virtual Console
Star Fox Command Original release date(s): JP: August 3, 2006; NA: August 28, 2006; AU: September 21, 2006; EU: January 26, 2007	Notes: Developed by Q-Games.; Fused strategic aspects into the series's traditional aerial combat.
Star Fox 64 3D Original release date(s): JP: July 14, 2011; EU: September 9, 2011; NA: September 11, 2011	Release years by system: 2011 – Nintendo 3DS
Star Fox 64 3D Original release date(s): JP: July 14, 2011; EU: September 9, 2011; NA: September 11, 2011	Notes: Developed by Nintendo EAD.; This game is an enhanced remake of Star Fox 64 for the Nintendo 3DS, basically displaying graphics in stereoscopic 3D, and many other changes.
Star Fox Zero Original release date(s): JP: April 21, 2016; NA/EU: April 22, 2016	Release years by system: 2016 – Wii U
Star Fox Zero Original release date(s): JP: April 21, 2016; NA/EU: April 22, 2016	Notes: Developed by PlatinumGames.; This game is the first original title in the series to be released in ten years.
Star Fox 2 Original release date(s): NA/EU: September 29, 2017; AU: September 30, 2017; JP: October 5, 2017	Release years by system: Cancelled – Super Nintendo Entertainment System; 2017 – Super NES Classic Edition; 2019 – Nintendo Switch Online
Star Fox 2 Original release date(s): NA/EU: September 29, 2017; AU: September 30, 2017; JP: October 5, 2017	Notes: Developed by Argonaut Games.; Was originally canceled due to its proposed release date's proximity with the release of the Nintendo 64 and internal development problems.
Star Fox Original release date(s): JP/NA/EU: June 25, 2026	Release years by system: 2026 – Nintendo Switch 2
Star Fox Original release date(s): JP/NA/EU: June 25, 2026	Notes: This game is an enhanced remake of Star Fox 64 for the Nintendo Switch 2

=== Cancelled titles ===
Game	Details
Star Fox Virtual Boy Original release date(s): Cancelled	Release years by system: Cancelled – Virtual Boy
Star Fox Virtual Boy Original release date(s): Cancelled	Notes: Shown at Electronic Entertainment Expo 1995 and Winter Consumer Electronics Show 1995 as a tech demo; later scrapped after Nintendo ceased support for the Virtual Boy early in its lifetime.
Star Fox Arcade Original release date(s): Cancelled	Release years by system: Cancelled – Arcade
Star Fox Arcade Original release date(s): Cancelled	Notes: Originally planned as a companion game with Star Fox: Assault, but was abandoned and never released.

=== Spin-offs ===
Game	Details
Star Fox Original release date(s): NA: June 1, 1993	Release years by system: 1993 – Nelsonic game watch
Star Fox Original release date(s): NA: June 1, 1993	Notes: Released in Europe as Starwing.; Re-released in at least 2 different styles of physical layout.; Features a quartz accurate digital clock, a resettable alarm, and a headphone jack (with included headphones).
Star Fox Guard Original release date(s): JP: April 21, 2016; NA: April 22, 2016; EU: April 22, 2016	Release years by system: 2016 – Wii U
Star Fox Guard Original release date(s): JP: April 21, 2016; NA: April 22, 2016; EU: April 22, 2016	Notes: Developed by PlatinumGames.; Instead of being a game about aerial combat, Star Fox Guard is a tower defense game.; Comes packaged for free with Star Fox Zero.
