= Tsuguo Mogami =

Japanese voice actor (born 1980)

- 最上 嗣生
- Born: January 8, 1980 (age 46); Saitama Prefecture, Japan
- Occupation: Voice actor
- Years active: 2002–present
- Agent: Ken Production

Tsuguo Mogami (最上 嗣生, Mogami Tsuguo) (born January 8, 1980) is a Japanese voice actor.

== Biography ==
Mogami was born in Saitama Prefecture, Japan.

== Filmography ==
=== Television animation ===
- MegaMan NT Warrior: Axess (2004) – SwordMan (Yellow)
- Guin Saga (2009) – Duke Bek
- Attack on Titan (2013–2022) – Keith Shadis
- Attack on Titan: Junior High (2015) – Keith Shadis
- My Hero Academia (2016–2023) – Atsuhiro Sako/Mr. Compress, Nomu, Crust
- Star Fox Zero: The Battle Begins (2016) – Andross, General Pepper
- Vinland Saga (2019–present) – Gunnar
- BNA: Brand New Animal (2020) – Saotome
- Plunderer (2020) – Sergeant
- Shaman King (2021) – Hang Zang-Ching, Chris Venstar
- Utawarerumono: Mask of Truth (2022) – Soyankekur
- Fist of the North Star (2026) – Toki
- Nippon Sangoku (2026) – Daisuke Hei

=== Original net animation ===
- The King of Fighters: Destiny (2017–2018) – Rugal Bernstein
- Great Pretender (2020) – Chen Yao
- Bastard!! -Heavy Metal, Dark Fantasy-: Efreet (2022)
- Gaiken Shijō Shugi (2022) – Hinto Kon
- Pluto (2023) – Becker
- Record of Ragnarok III (2025) – Adamas

=== Theatrical animation ===
- KonoSuba: God's Blessing on This Wonderful World! Legend of Crimson (2019) – Village Chief

=== Video games ===
- Samurai Shodown V (2003) – Rasetsumaru
- Luminous Arc 2 (2008) – Gaston
- Wario Land: Shake It! (2008) – Shake King
- Super Street Fighter IV (2010) – Guy
- The Legend of Zelda: Skyward Sword (2011) – Demise
- Star Fox 64 3D (2011) – Andross, General Pepper, Pigma Dengar
- Street Fighter X Tekken (2012) – Guy
- Detective Pikachu (2016) – Carlos Hernando
- Star Fox Zero (2016) – General Pepper, Pigma Dengar, Andross
- Star Fox Guard (2016) – Pigma Dengar
- The King of Fighters XIV (2017) – Ryuji Yamazaki
- Fire Emblem Echoes: Shadows of Valentia (2017) – Deen, Massena
- Super Mario Odyssey (2017) – Spewart
- The King of Fighters All Star (2018) – Rugal Bernstein, Ryuji Yamazaki
- Judge Eyes (2018) – Keigo Izumida
- Starlink: Battle for Atlas (2019) – Pigma Dengar
- The King of Fighters XV (2022) – Omega Rugal, Ryuji Yamazaki
- Donkey Kong Bananza (2025) – King K. Rool
- The Legend of Zelda: Ocarina of Time (2026) - Rauru, Kaepora Gaebora

=== Dubbing roles ===
==== Live-action ====
- 1917 (Lance Corporal Tom Blake (Dean-Charles Chapman))
- 21 Jump Street (Greg Jenko (Channing Tatum))
- 22 Jump Street (Greg Jenko (Channing Tatum))
- The Affair (Cole Lockhart (Joshua Jackson))
- Blue Story (Switcher (Eric Kofi-Abrefa))
- The Breakfast Club (John Bender (Judd Nelson))
- Drag Me to Hell (Rham Jas (Dileep Rao))
- The Fast and the Furious: Tokyo Drift (Takashi (Brian Tee))
- Fireproof (Terrell Sanders (Eric Young))
- The Forever Purge (Juan (Tenoch Huerta))
- Gladiator II (Viggo (Lior Raz))
- Hatchet (Marcus (Deon Richmond))
- Imagine That (Noah Kulick (Stephen Rannazzisi))
- The Matrix (2015 WOWOW edition (additional recording)) (Morpheus (Laurence Fishburne))
- Midway (Lieutenant Commander Eugene Lindsey (Darren Criss))
- Mowgli: Legend of the Jungle (Shere Khan (Benedict Cumberbatch))
- Power Rangers Samurai (Kevin (Najee De-Tiege))
- Red Heat (2021 WOWOW edition (additional recording)) (Sergeant Max Gallagher (Richard Bright))
- Six Feet Under (Billy Chenowith (Jeremy Sisto))
- The Walking Dead (Eugene Porter (Josh McDermitt), Morgan Jones (Lennie James))

==== Animation ====
- Babar: The Movie (Pompadour)
- Brother Bear 2 (Bering the Raccoon)
- Chowder (Gazpacho)
- Codename: Kids Next Door (Father)
- Lookism (Pyeon Duk Hwa/Binto Kon)
- The Lord of the Rings: The War of the Rohirrim (Sir Flight)
- Motorcity (Dutch Gordy)
- Sausage Party (Carl)
- Sing (Brand Manager Bull)
- Sing 2 (Stan)
- Spider-Man (John Jameson)
- Spider-Man Unlimited (John Jameson)
- Star Trek: Lower Decks (Sam Rutherford)
- Teen Titans (Overload)
- X-Men '97 (Scott Summers/Cyclops)
- Wreck-It Ralph (Markowski)
