= Star Fox Command =

2006 video game

- North American box art
- Developers: Q-Games; Nintendo EAD
- Publisher: Nintendo
- Director: Dylan Cuthbert
- Producer: Takaya Imamura
- Programmer: Ryuji Nishikawa
- Artists: Takaya Imamura; Paul Leonard
- Writer: Takaya Imamura
- Composer: Hajime Wakai
- Series: Star Fox
- Platform: Nintendo DS
- Release: JP: August 3, 2006; NA: August 28, 2006; AU: September 21, 2006; EU: January 26, 2007
- Genres: Shoot 'em up, turn-based strategy
- Modes: Single-player, multiplayer

Star Fox Command is a 2006 shoot 'em up video game developed by Nintendo and Q-Games and published by Nintendo for the Nintendo DS. The fifth installment in the Star Fox series, Command is the first installment released for a handheld, and supports the Nintendo Wi-Fi Connection, making it the first installment with online multiplayer. The game was re-released for the Wii U's Virtual Console service in 2015.

The game is set a few years after the events of Star Fox Assault, and follows Fox McCloud attempting to defend the Lylat System from aquatic alien race known as the Anglar. Q-Games worked on Intersect, which Nintendo decided to turn into a DS game. The game was generally well-received; it has achieved an average score of 76% from GameRankings, a reviews aggregate.

== Gameplay ==
Screenshot showing the upper and lower screens during gameplay

The game has two types of single-player gameplay including a strategic map and battle mode. The overworld-like map mode is where the player takes command of several ships. The mode is used to get ships into the battle mode and is essentially a simple turn-based strategy game. Up to four ships can be maneuvered at a time. The object of the mode is to prevent the enemy ones from reaching the Great Fox. It also allows players to fire missiles from the Great Fox that they have picked up from exploring in this mode, or from meeting certain conditions in the battle mode (usually destroying all enemies). When a craft that is controlled by the player encounters an enemy group or missile in this mode, the gameplay switches to the battle mode.

Battle mode is similar to the "all-range mode" employed in Star Fox 64 for some bosses and levels. Like the cancelled Star Fox 2 the game is completely all-range, as opposed to the "on-rails" levels featured in most other Star Fox games (however, the game will sometimes force the player to engage in classic "chase" missions in order to complete an objective). The usual objectives are to destroy a base ship, destroy all enemies, or collect a number of cores to complete the battle mode. Once the battle mode is completed, the game returns to the map mode. As players progress through the game, they are able to choose to go different routes upon completing certain levels. Each route has its own character dialogue to accompany it, and players are able to visit differing planets depending on what routes they choose. The game features 9 different endings altogether, and gamers can access all of them by playing the game multiple times, selecting different routes each time. Instead of merely giving different perspectives on what happens to the Star Fox team, each ending is unique — the characters go in various directions depending on what ending is watched. Star Fox Command does not feature traditional voice acting. Instead it outputs gibberish akin to the "voices" in Star Fox for the SNES, or the "Lylat speech" present in Lylat Wars. Players can also record their own voices into the game's "gibberish generator" using the built-in DS microphone where it is converted into the garbled speech of the various characters.

=== Multiplayer ===
Star Fox Command supports six players in local wireless multiplayer matches via DS Download Play and up to three players on the Nintendo Wi-Fi Connection. In Nintendo Wi-Fi Connection matches, only the Arwing II is available. Players score not by killing opponents, but by collecting stars from them when they have been destroyed. It is also possible to collect a star from an opponent not killed by the player. This is a modified version of the mode from Star Fox 64/Lylat Wars. Nintendo Wi-Fi uses a ranking system based on rankings of the alphabet with Z being the lowest and A being the highest. Players work their way up from Z by collecting wins (they could be based on points). For every win a player gains a certain amount of percentage and once they reach 100% they move to the next letter. The highest rank a player can get is 100% of the A rank.

== Plot and setting ==
=== Setting and characters ===
The game is set in the Lylat system, using a similar map as Star Fox 64 to switch between each area. The majority of planets from Star Fox 64 return, with the exception of Fortuna, Macbeth, and Zoness. Command has the largest number of playable characters in any Star Fox game, with a total of fourteen, consisting of Star Fox team members Fox McCloud, Falco Lombardi, Krystal, Slippy Toad, and Peppy Hare; Star Wolf team members Wolf O'Donnell, Panther Caroso, and Leon Powalski, Star Fox 64 supporting characters Bill Grey and Katt Monroe; Fox's father James McCloud; and three new characters created for Command: Slippy's fiancée Amanda, Peppy's daughter Lucy, and Andross's grandson Dash Bowman.

Other characters make non-playable appearances in the game's story. ROB 64 pilots the Great Fox when on the map screen, while Slippy's father Beltino Toad makes an appearance during a mission briefing. In addition to primary antagonist Anglar Emperor, Andross's nephew Andrew Oikonny, Pigma Dengar, the ghost of Andross, and F-Zero series racer Octoman can all appear as bosses depending on the player's route in gameplay.

=== Story ===
A few years after the self-destruction of the Aparoid race, the Star Fox team has disbanded. Peppy has succeeded General Pepper as commander of the Cornerian army; Falco has become an independent mercenary; Slippy has retired from active flying to spend time with his fiancée, Amanda; and Krystal has disappeared after breaking up with Fox. While patrolling the galaxy with ROB 64, Fox learns of the appearance of the Anglars, a race of aquatic aliens that had been bioengineered by Andross and living beneath the acidic seas on the planet Venom. Led by the Anglar Emperor, the Anglar army has begun waging war across the Lylat system, taking control of most of its planets. Learning that the Anglars are now attacking Corneria, Fox rushes to battle the invaders.

From this point, there are multiple paths the story can take. While the player is initially forced to follow a specific linear progression, reaching the game's ending for the first time will unlock the ability to access alternate routes when replaying the game. The player is able to select Fox's actions through dialogue choices, which affect the progression of stages, the characters that appear, and the events of the story itself. There are nine possible endings, each of which reveals a possible future for the characters, such as Amanda joining Star Fox, Fox and Krystal's son Marcus forming a new Star Fox team, Krystal becoming a bounty hunter, or Dash leading efforts to revitalize Venom.

Star Fox Command remains the final chronological installment in the storyline that began with Star Fox 64. Dylan Cuthbert and Takaya Imamura stated in an interview with IGN in 2006 that if this storyline was continued, it would "start in the middle", not relying on any of the game's endings. Imamura expressed a similar sentiment in an interview with Nintendo Dream in 2011, expressing a personal desire to end Fox's story with Command, leaving the true ending up to the player's interpretation and instead exploring other periods in the timeline for future installments, such as a prequel to 64 or even a sequel set between it and Star Fox Adventures. In a 2018 Reddit post, Cuthbert stated that "canon is something the fans like to try to follow but Command was meant to be an alternate timeline kind of game, hence the choices you make. It let us have a lot more fun with the characters".

== Development ==
Star Fox Command was co-developed by Q-Games and directed by its founder, Dylan Cuthbert, who previously served as a lead programmer of the original Star Fox duology. Q-Games was working on a puzzle game called Digidrive for Nintendo when they were approached by Shigeru Miyamoto, who suggested that they'd do a concept demo for Star Fox for the then-coming Nintendo DS, which lead to the team spending a couple of months creating a "space elevator" demo styled after the original Star Fox. They also had massively revamped the look of the Star Fox characters and team, but this direction was dropped when the game entered full production and series character artist Takaya Imamura was assigned to produce the title.

According to Cuthbert, Miyamoto approached him and his company because he wanted to see more of the ideas from the then-unreleased Star Fox 2 (who Cuthbert was heavily involved with during its development), such as its strategy game elements, explored and applied to the Nintendo DS with its two screens, as he viewed the Star Fox IP as an avenue to explore new ideas in 3D gaming as opposed to relying on a consistent formula, and thus encouraged the team to try out various new ideas and see what happened; for example, Cuthbert wanted to include more traditional rail-shooter stages in the game design, similar to stages present in previous games such as Star Fox and Star Fox 64, but Miyamoto was adamant that the team stuck with free-range stages, desiring to take the project "elsewhere" as opposed to just copying the original games. The team had also originally experimented with incorporating the Arwing transformations from Star Fox 2, but this would ultimately be scrapped.

Nintendo EAD was heavily involved in the general direction the game was taking during pre-production, providing feedback on the many control scheme prototypes the team were experimenting with; Miyamoto in particular was responsible for some of the final control ideas with the DS's stylus. Once Command's direction was decided upon and the main development began, Q-Games would handle the main game design, but the music, sound, story, and characters were handled in-house by Nintendo EAD, with Hajima Wakai (who previously composed Star Fox 64's soundtrack) returning as the composer, and Imamura being responsible for the characters, enemies and storylines, and their respective endings.

Imamura had originally intended on creating a single, linear narrative somewhat similar to the one presented in Command's predecessor, Star Fox: Assault, but Cuthbert would ultimately convince him to turn it into a larger, branching storyline with multiple pathways and endings, inspired by choose your own adventure gamebooks such as the Fighting Fantasy series. According to Imamura, when approaching the multiple story arcs in Command, he was influenced by the TV drama show 24, with its focus on character development and intertwining plot-lines.

Star Fox Command is the first Star Fox title to incorporate online multiplayer. While the team investigated the possibility of utilizing the game's strategy gameplay elements in the Wi-Fi mode, it was ultimately decided early on to incorporate only dog-fighting, as they were looking for something that simple and easy to play, and also because of the positive reception towards the dogfights in Star Fox 64. As online was new territory for the team, this part of the game's development reportedly took a bit longer than expected, having to deal with issues such as keeping all players in sync.

Star Fox Command was announced at the E3 2006 conference, under the name Star Fox DS. The game was re-released for the Wii U's Virtual Console worldwide in June and August 2015.

== Reception ==
Reception

Aggregate scores
Aggregator	Score
GameRankings	76%
Metacritic	76/100

Review scores
Publication	Score
Electronic Gaming Monthly	6.5/10
Famitsu	32/40
Game Informer	8/10
IGN	8/10
X-Play	4/5

Award
Publication	Award
IGN	August 2006 DS Game of the Month

Star Fox Command debuted on the Japanese best seller list as number 14, selling over 20,000 copies on the first day. In the United States, it was the 5th best seller in the first week. Star Fox Command has received mostly positive reviews, with a Metacritic score of 76/100 and a GameRankings score of 76%. IGN gave it an 8 out of 10, or "Impressive", calling it a "surprisingly rich and faithful action game" that had similar game play to Star Fox and Star Fox 64. Star Fox Command received IGN DS's August 2006 Game of the Month Award for capturing the fun and essence that made the series significant. Famitsu gave a 32/40, and was cited as an influence for the game's large initial sales. It received a 4 out of 5 star rating on G4's X-Play, praising the stylus control and the strategy elements. The Associated Press noted the game for having developed the game to work well with the DS controls, but had mixed feelings about the turn-based sections of gameplay. Electronic Gaming Monthly claimed that while the game has its own charm, it lacks the original gameplay from Star Fox and Star Fox 64 and becomes repetitive. UK website Mansized gave Command a three out of five stars. Command was nominated in three categories in Nintendo Power's annual vote-in awards, although it did not win in any of them. Star Fox Command has also received an 8 from Game Informer. The game was lauded for its solid gameplay mechanics and received criticism for its brevity.
