= Star Fox 2 =

2017 video game completed in 1995

- Box art used on SNES Classic Edition
- Developers: Nintendo EAD; Argonaut Software
- Publisher: Nintendo
- Director: Katsuya Eguchi
- Producer: Shigeru Miyamoto
- Programmers: Dylan Cuthbert; Takumi Kawagoe; Yasuhiro Kawaguchi
- Artist: Masanao Arimoto
- Composers: Kozue Ishikawa; Yumiko Kanki
- Series: Star Fox
- Platform: Super Nintendo Entertainment System (Note: Star Fox 2 is programmed for and runs on Super NES consoles. It never received a physical release, but the ROM image was released on the Super NES Classic Edition microconsole.)
- Release: Super NES Classic Edition: NA/EU: September 29, 2017; JP: October 5, 2017
- Genres: Shoot 'em up, real-time strategy
- Mode: Single-player

Star Fox 2 is a shoot 'em up game developed by Nintendo and Argonaut Software for the Super Nintendo Entertainment System (SNES). It was completed in 1995, but was not released until 2017 on the Super NES Classic Edition. Like the original Star Fox (1993), the player controls the Star Fox team as they battle Emperor Andross, who survived his previous defeat and seeks to destroy the Lylat System. Star Fox 2 introduces semi-real-time gameplay, new ship types, new playable characters, and a more advanced 3D game engine.

The development began after Star Fox's release, with Katsuya Eguchi, Shigeru Miyamoto, and Dylan Cuthbert returning as director, producer, and lead programmer. Like the original, Star Fox 2 pushed the SNES's graphical capabilities with Argonaut's Super FX chip. The team experimented more than they had with Star Fox and incorporated platforming and roguelike elements. Star Fox 2 was set for release in August 1995, but 3D technology was advancing quickly, with competition from the Sony PlayStation and Sega Saturn. Concerned that Star Fox 2's 16-bit graphics would compare poorly against newer games, Nintendo canceled the release to prioritize its upcoming Nintendo 64 console.

Concepts from Star Fox 2 were incorporated in subsequent Star Fox games, including Star Fox 64 (1997), and ROM images of incomplete builds were leaked online. In September 2017, Nintendo released Star Fox 2 as one of the 21 games included in the Super NES Classic Edition. In 2019, it became available for the Nintendo Switch through the Nintendo Classics service. Star Fox 2 received generally positive reviews, with praise for its depth, design, and strategy elements, but criticism for its controls, short length, and technical performance.

== Gameplay ==
The overworld map with Corneria at the bottom-left

Unlike the pure rail shooter structure of the first Star Fox, Star Fox 2 contextualizes its missions within a larger real-time strategy framework. The player is tasked with protecting their home world, Corneria, from the villain Andross and his forces, and must defeat him to win the game. Corneria and Andross are located on opposite sides of an overworld map. The overworld map continuously operates in real-time; as the player is fighting missions, enemies spawn in the overworld and make their way towards Corneria. As the game progresses, Corneria can be damaged. If Corneria reaches 100% damage before Andross is defeated, the player will lose. If the player defeats Andross first, they win the game and are given a score.

At the start, the player chooses two pilots from among either Fox, Slippy, Falco, Peppy, Miyu, or Fay. Each character has their own Arwing ship with unique performance characteristics and a special ability. Between missions, the player can swap between their two pilots on the overworld, to allow the other a break to recharge shields. Missions have different formats. If the player chooses to engage with enemy ships or missiles, the mission is a dogfight which has the player flying around to take down the enemy threat. Engaging a battle cruiser sees the player flying a "trench run" inside, navigating through the ship's interior to destroy its core. In addition to engaging enemy craft, the player can also conduct missions on planets in which they can freely transform their Arwing between flying and land-based walker configurations. The player must balance defensive missions to protect Corneria with offensives bringing them closer to Andross. A hard mode is available that increases the variety of missions.

== Plot ==
After his defeat in the original Star Fox, the antagonist, Andross, returns to the Lylat system and launches an all-out attack against Corneria, using his new fleet of battleships and giant missiles launched from hidden bases to destroy the planet. General Pepper again calls upon the Star Fox team for help. Armed with new custom Arwings, a Mothership, and two new recruits (Miyu and Fay), the Star Fox team sets out to defend Corneria by destroying Andross's forces before they can inflict critical damage on the planet. Along the way, Star Fox must also combat giant bosses, bases on planets throughout the Lylat system, members of the Star Wolf team and finally Andross himself.

Star Fox 2 features six playable characters, more than any game in the series until Star Fox Command (2006). These include Fox McCloud, fearless leader of the Star Fox team; Falco Lombardi, the ace pilot with a headstrong attitude and Fox's best friend; Peppy Hare, longtime mentor to Fox who served under James McCloud, Fox's late father; and Slippy Toad, the team's young tech analyst and Fox's childhood friend. The two new playable characters are Miyu, a tomboyish lynx, and Fay, a white dog and part of an aristocratic family. Star Fox 2 also introduces a team of rival mercenary pilots, Star Wolf, which includes Wolf O'Donnell, leader of Star Wolf and a despicable criminal; Leon Powalski, an inscrutable and sinister chameleon; Pigma Dengar, an arrogant and selfish pig who is a former member of the Star Fox team before betraying them; and Algy, a devious creature with incredible precision aim.

== Development ==
Like Star Fox (1993), Star Fox 2 was co-developed by Nintendo EAD in Japan and the British company Argonaut Software. Development began shortly after work was finished on the European and competition versions of Star Fox. Argonaut had a contract with Nintendo to create three games; after Star Fox, Argonaut programmers Giles Goddard and Dylan Cuthbert worked on Stunt Race FX (1994) and Cuthbert on Star Fox 2. Cuthbert worked in Nintendo's headquarters in Kyoto and had little contact with Argonaut during development. He served as the lead programmer and was assigned two Japanese Nintendo programmers to work under him. The team was overseen by the designers Shigeru Miyamoto and Katsuya Eguchi, with Eguchi as the director. Edge reported in December 1993 that development on a sequel to Star Fox had begun.

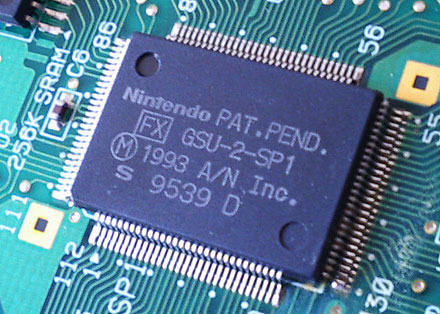
The Super FX 2 chip developed by Argonaut Software, seen here in Yoshi's Island

The team decided early on to use the Super FX 2 chip in the game cartridge. It was an enhanced version of the Super FX, a reduced instruction set computer (RISC) for SNES ROM cartridges developed by Argonaut. The original chip was designed to calculate 3D math quickly and was first used in Star Fox. The Super FX 2 had more memory and ran at 21 MHz, twice as fast as the original chip. Argonaut's original proposal for the Super FX used this improved architecture, but Nintendo found it too expensive. Cuthbert also rewrote parts of the engine to run in parallel in RAM to free more Super FX 2 processing for more advanced features, such as planar clipping and advanced collision detection. These enhancements enabled the chip to manipulate more polygons and sprites and to map textures more quickly, giving the team the computing power needed for free-roaming 3D environments. Such free-roaming gameplay was planned for the original Star Fox, but it was made on-rails because of the original Super FX chip's limited computing powers. Cuthbert also retooled the engine to increase the frame rate from 20 to 30 frames per second, but it was not steady so they locked the frame rate at 20 FPS. Freely explorable environments were the only gameplay element planned for the original Star Fox carried into Star Fox 2; all other ideas were new.

Miyamoto considered the Star Fox series a platform for experimenting with new gameplay ideas. The team experimented more with Star Fox 2 than Star Fox. This led to gameplay ideas such as the platforming sequences with the robot walker. Miyamoto took great interest in Cuthbert's platforming gameplay (before Super Mario 64's release in 1996). At one point in development, the Walker sequences occurred in much larger space stations with energy gates that needed to be unlocked, a gameplay structure comparable to dungeon crawling. Because of the Super FX 2's greater computing power, the team decided to have the fighters visibly transform into bipedal Walkers. The transformation was made in a realistic sense; the artists drafted the mechanisms by which the fighters transformed.

Eguchi wanted to explore a more roguelike game system and use similar game mechanics to Star Luster (1985). He played Star Luster repeatedly for inspiration and was particularly fond of its random encounters system. He also enjoyed Fortune Street and was inspired by its more strategic gameplay elements. Given this direction, the team designed the main gameplay structure: players would move across a map defending planets from the enemy, battling in randomly generated enemy encounters. It was designed to play out differently each gameplay session. For further replayability, the team added six playable characters, two of which were series newcomers: Miyu and Fay. More antagonists were added, including Wolf. A two-player mode was planned and tested, but the team could not get the frame rate high and steady enough for it to be enjoyable.

=== Promotion at Winter CES ===
Star Fox 2 was playable on the show floor at the Winter Consumer Electronics Show (Winter CES) in Las Vegas in January 1995. The version demonstrated was significantly different from the final version. GamePro enjoyed the free-roaming gameplay, the craft morphing ability, and strategy elements. Electronic Gaming Monthly also liked the shift to free-roaming and felt the non-linear gameplay and ship morphing abilities were major improvements. Nintendo Power named it the best SNES game of the show. All three magazines thought Star Fox 2 was better than the original. Edge was more critical, writing that Star Fox 2 was Nintendo's attempt to keep the SNES relevant. They wrote that the Super FX polygons were not particularly impressive, and the gameplay lacked "the immediate appeal of its predecessor". A man was arrested and charged with felony grand larceny for attempting to steal a demo cart from the show floor.

=== Cancellation ===
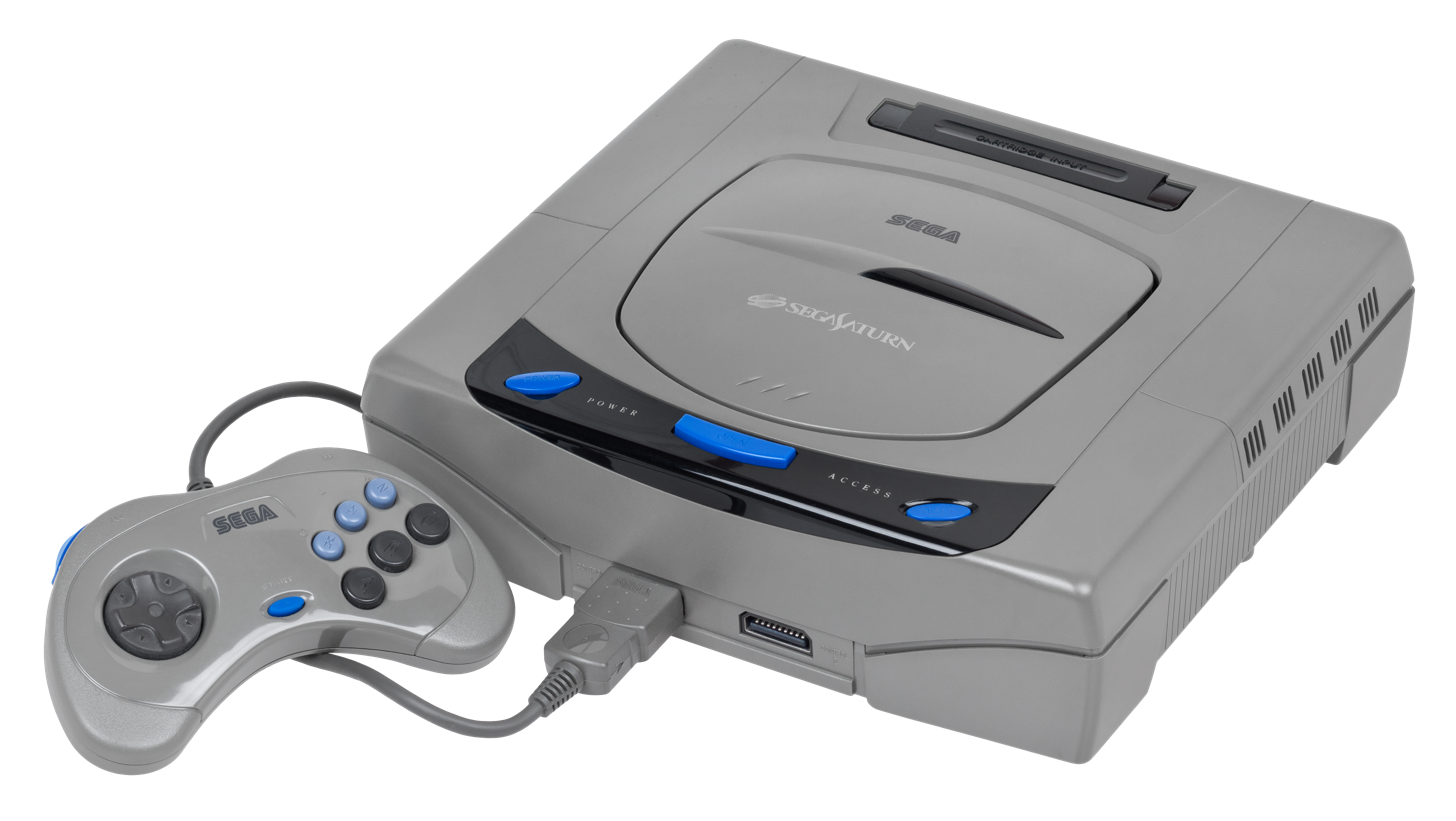

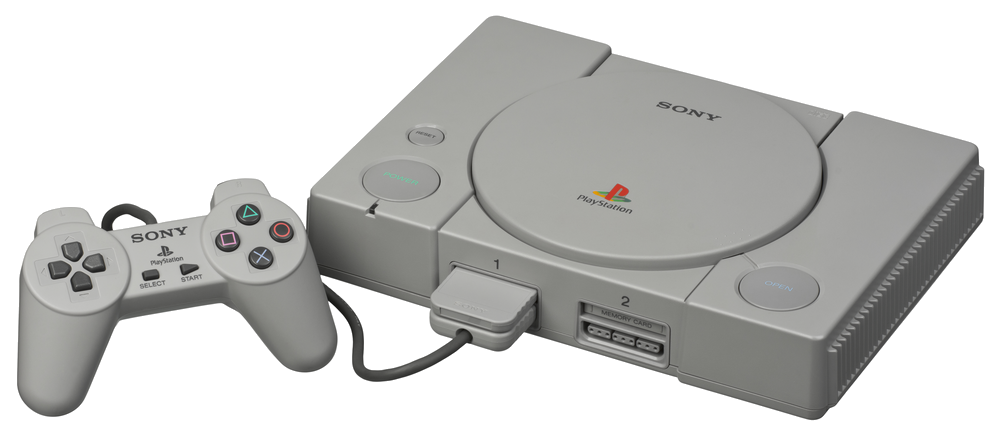
Nintendo was concerned Star Fox 2 would be compared unfavorably to the superior 3D capabilities of the competing Sega Saturn (top) and PlayStation (bottom).

By mid-1995, Star Fox 2 was nearing completion, and was planned for release in August. However, 3D technology was advancing quickly and the 3D game market was expanding, with competition from the Sony PlayStation and Sega Saturn. The consoles ran impressive 3D graphics that captured the public's attention. Nintendo was concerned that the 16-bit Star Fox 2 3D visuals would be compared to the superior 3D capabilities of competing consoles. Cuthbert said that Star Fox 2 would be "compared directly against games such as Ridge Racer, which felt like you finally had an arcade machine's power in your home".

Nintendo decided to prioritize its upcoming Nintendo 64 console, including a new Star Fox game, Star Fox 64. According to Cuthbert, Miyamoto wanted a clear break between 3D games on the SNES and Nintendo 64. The Super FX 2 chip also raised the cost of production, which would have made Star Fox 2 an expensive release.

Star Fox 2 was canceled in mid-1995, when it was about 95% complete. Despite the cancellation, Nintendo completed full localization and QA testing. Cuthbert said there may have been no official announcement of the cancellation, and there was confusion in the media. The August issue of GamePro printed that it had been delayed to 1996, while Electronic Gaming Monthly wrote that it had been canceled in their September issue. Nintendo Power wrote in their September issue that "rumors of the demise of Star Fox 2 have been greatly exaggerated", and that it would likely be released in the first half of 1996.

== Release ==
=== Beta leaks ===
A screenshot from a prototype build, depicting Leon Powalski being shot down and exclaiming "Aah! Boss Wolf, I'm leaving the rest to you!"

In the years following the cancellation, ROM images of incomplete builds of Star Fox 2 were leaked anonymously online. Cuthbert denied he had leaked them and suspected the ROMs had been taken from his hard drive after he left Argonaut.

The first ROMs, leaked in the late 1990s, were early test builds with numerous bugs. They mostly consist of debug menus and sparsely populated landscapes; one version includes a two-player mode. A few years later, an anonymous person contacted the emulation community with a non-working copy of the final beta ROM. The community added a missing header to make it functional. This version was in Japanese and much more complete than previous leaks. The leak inspired the emulation community to improve Super FX chip handling in SNES emulators. Fans also created a translation patch, which took four people and over 100 hours of work. The patch developers also changed a debug modifier that was set to zero, preventing Corneria from taking damage. The 2020 Nintendo data leak included Star Fox 2 source code, revealing development tools and cut characters.

All leaked ROMs are beta versions. Some gameplay features do not work correctly, are incomplete, or hampered by bugs. According to Cuthbert, the ROMs lack the final few months of QA work. They were also all set up in debug mode, so the encounter systems and randomized gameplay elements do not work correctly. Cuthbert said: "The basic parts are there, but there is an adage in game development, 'The last 10 percent is 90 percent of the game,' and the ROM is missing that last 10 percent of iteration and refinement."

=== Official release ===
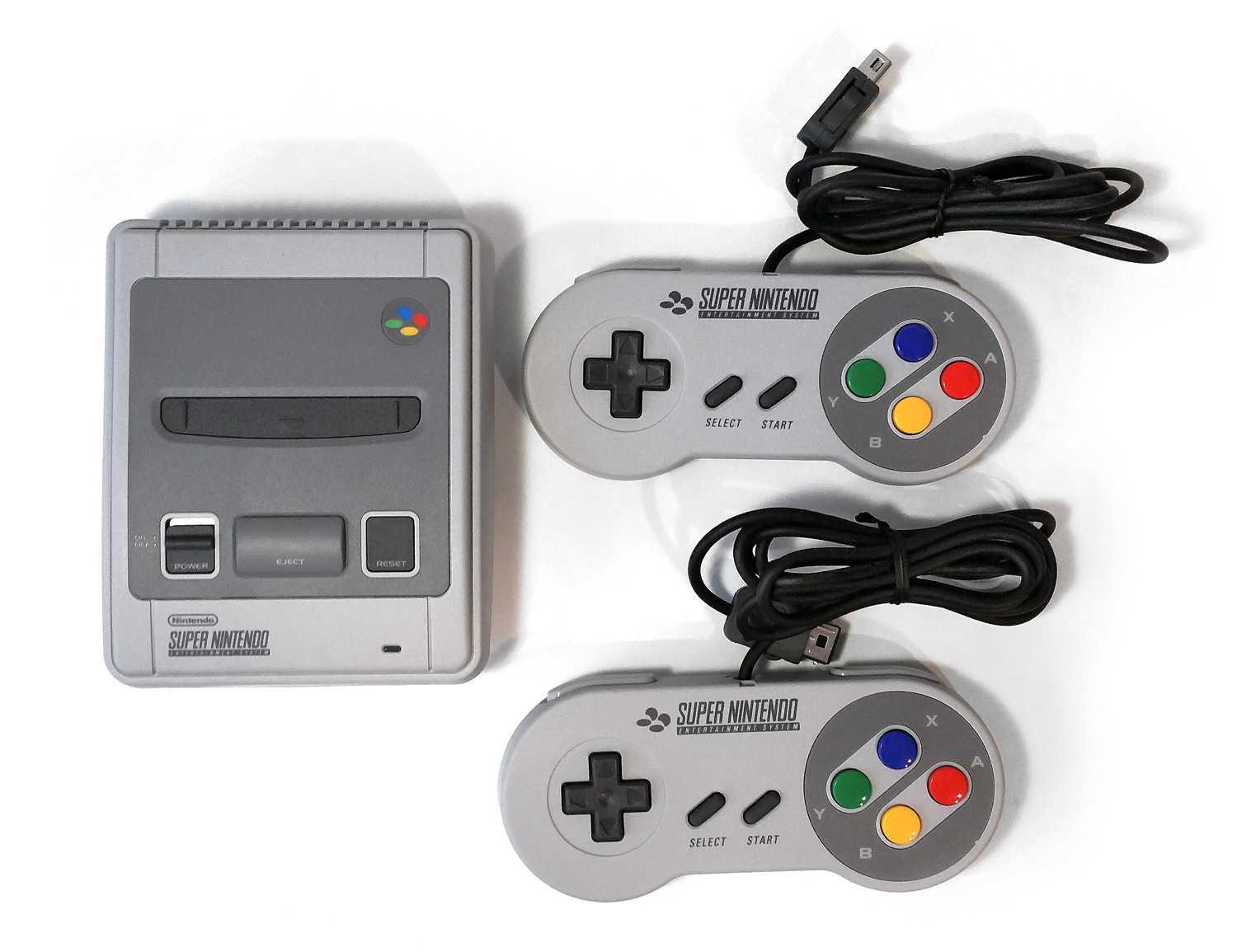
Star Fox 2 was released on the Super NES Classic Edition in 2017.

For many years, the completed version of Star Fox 2 remained in Nintendo's archives. Super FX games were not considered for Nintendo's Virtual Console distribution service because Nintendo had difficulty emulating the chip. In 2015, Miyamoto told journalists he recalled enjoying Star Fox 2 but would prefer to release new games.

In 2017, Nintendo announced the Super NES Classic Edition, a miniature version of the SNES with several games installed, including Star Fox 2. The SNES Classic producer proposed its inclusion as he felt it would be a waste otherwise to never release a completed game. The console was announced along with the game's inclusion in June 2017. The announcement came as a happy surprise to Cuthbert. No one from Argonaut or Q-Games was made aware ahead of the announcement. Some of the developers celebrated the announcement.

The Super NES Classic Edition was released on September 29, 2017, in North America and Europe and on October 5 in Japan. The version of Star Fox 2 is the localized English ROM that was completed in the 1990s, though Cuthbert suspected Nintendo made minor changes, such as altering screen flashing, to pass modern regulations. Promotional artwork was created by Takaya Imamura, the original Star Fox character designer. The instruction manual was released digitally online and included concept art and design documents, an unusual move for Nintendo. Star Fox 2 was also added to the Nintendo Classics service for Nintendo Switch on December 12, 2019.

== Reception ==
Reception

Review scores
| Publication | Score |
|---|---|
| Destructoid | 7/10 |
| Eurogamer | Recommended |
| GameSpot | 5/10 |
| GamesRadar+ | 3.5/5 |
| HobbyConsolas | 80/100 |
| IGN | 5/10 |
| Nintendo Life | 8/10 |
| Nintendo World Report | 9/10 |
| USgamer | 3/5 |

Star Fox 2 received generally positive reviews on the Super NES Classic Edition. Polygon's Ross Miller found it ambitious and fun. Destructoid's Chris Carter complimented the constant swap between viewpoints and playstyles, minimal "RPG-like" exposition between levels and the introduction of Star Wolf, finding that they added character, but noted its short length and criticized the low framerate. Eurogamer's Christian Donlan described it as an unusual but "wonderfully surprising and inventive" sequel that builds upon the first Star Fox, due to its more roguelite nature. GamesRadar+' David Houghton praised the evolution of the franchise's core ideas and free-roaming 3D planets, but criticized its uncohesive game mechanics, overambitious ideas and "choppy" technical performance.

IGN's Samuel Claiborn complimented the "janky-yet-plucky aesthetic" but complained of severe frame-rate drops and found it difficult to control the ships. He felt Star Fox 2 was the worst game included with the Super NES Classic Edition, and that it "probably deserved" to have been cancelled, but was happy to see it released. Nintendo Life's Damien McFerran praised the depth, complexity and challenge, and called it a good reason to own a Super NES Classic Edition. Nintendo World Report's Neal Ronaghan and John Rairdin praised the distinct structure and design, challenge, strategy and roguelike elements, audiovisual presentation, replayability and depth. Rairdin wrote that it was the most important game in the Star Fox series, and one of the greatest SNES games. However, both criticized the lack of rail shooter levels, the slowdown and clipping, and its technical limitations.

HobbyConsolas' David Martínez praised the Arwing's transformation mechanic, open levels and introduction of new Star Fox members and Star Wolf but criticized the short length, technical shortcomings and controls, feeling that it was not as well rounded as the first entry. Digital Trends' Mike Epstein felt that Star Fox 2 took some of the biggest risks the Star Fox franchise had attempted. The Verge's Andrew Webster called it "a fascinating experience". GameSpot's Michael Higham praised the land vehicle sequences, freedom of approach to manage an incoming threat and off-rails 3D dogfights in space, but criticized the technical performance and short length, and felt it lacked the sense of adventure of the first Star Fox. In Kotaku, Leah Williams praised Nintendo for carefully preserving Star Fox 2 and its coding assets, saying that "having this data two decades on is an incredible rarity".

== Legacy ==
Star Fox 2 inspired the design of later Star Fox games. Free-range flying and grounded vehicle gameplay were implemented into Star Fox 64, as was the Star Wolf team. Star Fox 2 also drove ideas for other Nintendo 64 games. Cuthbert believes the platforming experimentation in Star Fox 2 gave Miyamoto confidence for Super Mario 64. Although Argonaut's contract with Nintendo ended after Star Fox 2, Cuthbert and his new company Q-Games collaborated with Nintendo in 2006 for Star Fox Command, and again in 2011 for Star Fox 64 3D. Nintendo and Q-Games played Star Fox 2 to gather inspiration for the strategic gameplay elements for Star Fox Command. Miyamoto asked Cuthbert to make Command closer to Star Fox 2 than the original Star Fox. The Arwing's ability to transform into the Walker was re-introduced in Star Fox Zero (2016).
