= Shinobu Satouchi =

Japanese voice actor (born 1958)

- 里内 信夫
- Born: February 11, 1958 (age 68); Kyoto Prefecture, Japan
- Occupation: Voice actor
- Agent: Aoni Production

Shinobu Satouchi (里内 信夫, Satouchi Shinobu; born February 11, 1958) is a Japanese voice actor best known as the voice of Fox McCloud in the Japanese version of Nintendo's Star Fox series and Super Smash Bros. series. He was also the voice of Giru in Dragon Ball GT. He works at Aoni Production.

== Notable roles ==
=== TV ===
- Aoki Densetsu Shoot! (1993) – Teacher, Television Announcer, Unknown Player
- Dragon Ball GT (1996) – Giru
- One Piece (2000) – Carne
- Dragon Ball Kai (2009) – Doctor
- Dragon Quest (xxxx) – Great Maze
- Slam Dunk – (1993) Satoru Kakuta, Satoro Sasaoka (ep. 22)

=== Films ===
- Detective Conan: Crossroad in the Ancient Capital (2003) – Shichirou Washio

=== Video games ===
- Star Fox 64 (1997) – Fox McCloud, Leon Powalski, Caiman, Sarumarine Pilot
- Star Fox: Assault (2005) – Leon Powalski
- Super Smash Bros. series (xxxx) – Fox McCloud (Original and Melee), Leon Powalski (Brawl), Dr. Wright (Brawl)

=== Dubbing ===
- Thomas the Tank Engine & Friends (1990–2004) – BoCo (Season 2–3), Peter Sam (Season 4–7), additional voices (Season 1–7)
