= Yūsuke Numata =

Japanese voice actor (born 1968)

- 沼田 祐介
- Born: June 10, 1968 (age 57); Kanagawa Prefecture, Japan
- Occupation: Voice actor
- Years active: 1989–present

Yūsuke Numata (沼田 祐介, Numata Yūsuke; born June 10, 1968 in Kanagawa Prefecture), also known by the stage name Hiroaki Yamada (山田 浩明, Yamada Hiroaki), is a Japanese voice actor who is affiliated with Aoni Production.

== Background ==
When he was in the 4th grade of elementary school, he saw "The Galaxy Express 999" and was so impressed that he became aware of voice work. In junior high school, he became obsessed with idols such as Akina Nakamori, but in high school, "Lupin III: The Castle of Cagliostro" and his involvement in the Kyudo club led him to pursue voice acting again. After graduating from high school, he went on to attend the Broadcasting Arts Academy College and moved to Tokyo at the age of 21. Graduated from the 10th term of Seiji Juku Tokyo School. He made his debut in the anime "Dragon Quest. He has since continued his career with minor roles, and played his first leading role as Masato Kaneda in "Super Electric Robot Tetsujin 28-go FX".

== Voice roles ==
=== Television animation ===
- Atashin'chi (Yoshioka)
- Aoki Densetsu Shoot (Shinichi Nitta)
- Mobile Suit Gundam SEED (Ahmed El Fasi)
- Marvel Disk Wars: The Avengers (Norman Osborn/Green Goblin)
- Konjiki no Gash Bell!! (Mamoru Iwashima)
- Dragon Ball Z (Ikose, Jewel, Obake, Saibamen)
- Dragon Ball GT (Baby)
- Dragon Ball Kai (Gregory)
- Dragon Ball Super (Quitela, Kettle, Koitsukai and Biarra)
- Beyblade (Ananda)
- Marmalade Boy (Student A (ep. 24))
- Sailor Moon R (Shinozaki (ep. 49))
- Stitch! (Perorin (ep. 11))
- GeGeGe no Kitaro (90s) (Kashabo (ep. 61))
- Futari wa Pretty Cure Max Heart (Horpun)
- Bobobo-bo Bo-bobo (Sakana)
- RockMan.EXE (MegaMan NT Warrior) (Dekao Oyama) (Dex Oyama)
- One Piece (Chess, Risky Brother, Antonio, Speed Jiru, Peseta, Skull, Charlotte Mascarpone, Kaku from Wano and Gerotini)
- Ojarumaru (Ken)
- Sword Art Online (Slug (ep. 21))
- Kagewani (Takeru (ep. 1), Sanjou (ep. 2))
- Midnight Horror School (Zobie)

=== OVA ===
- Twinbee (Zakobī)

=== Tokusatsu ===
- Juukou B-Fighter (Mercenary Iruba (ep. 16))
- B-Fighter Kabuto (Water Dwelling Beast Kapparapa (ep. 20))
- Mirai Sentai Timeranger (Tac)
- Tokusou Sentai Dekaranger (Juuzaian Braidy (ep. 6), Sudolaian Girenu (ep. 48))
- GoGo Sentai Boukenger (Tsukumogami Mamorigami (ep. 35))
- Kamen Rider Wizard Original DVD (Gargoyle)
- Uchu Sentai Kyuranger (Manavil (ep. 22))

=== Video games ===
- Summon Night: Swordcraft Story 2 (Ryouga)
- Mega Man Network Transmission (Dex Oyama)
- Star Fox: Assault (Andrew Oikonny, NUS64)
- Dragon Ball GT: Final Bout (Golden Great Ape Baby Vegeta)
- Dragon Ball Z: Budokai 3 (Saibamen)
- Dragon Ball Z: Budokai Tenkaichi series (Baby Vegeta)
- Dragon Ball Z: Budokai Tenkaichi 2 (Saibamen and Baby Vegeta)
- Dragon Ball Z: Infinite World (Saibamen and Super Baby Vegeta 2)
- Dragon Ball FighterZ (Saibamen and Super Baby 2)
- SegaSonic the Hedgehog (Mighty the Armadillo)
- Yu-Gi-Oh! Monster Capsule: Breed & Battle (Ryo Bakura)

=== Dubbing ===
- The Adventures of Jimmy Neutron: Boy Genius as Sheen Estevez
- Thomas the Tank Engine & Friends as Toad (Seasons 4-7), Troublesome Trucks (Season 5), Stephen Hatt (Season 5)
- Lights, Camera, ACTION! Wiggles TV Series as Greg Wiggle
- Shirt Tales (Buck Beaver from "The Big Foot Incident" and "Dinkel's Ark")

== Other Japanese ==
- Pinocchio's Daring Journey (Lampy)
