= List of Star Fox characters =

The Star Fox team from Star Fox: Assault (2005); from left to right, Slippy Toad, Fox McCloud, Falco Lombardi and Krystal.

Star Fox is a series of spaceship shooter games published by Nintendo. The main protagonist and player character of the series is Fox McCloud, the leader of Star Fox, a team of anthropomorphic animals in the Lylat planetary system. Gameplay involves control of futuristic aircraft called Arwings, as well as other vehicles and combat on foot.

According to programmer Dylan Cuthbert, several names of animals were used in the names of the characters whenever the development team believed they, for those characters, "[sounded] good".

== Star Fox ==
Star Fox, (Note: Japanese: スターフォックス, Hepburn: Sutā Fokkusu) or Team Star Fox, is a band of adventurers-for-hire often employed by General Pepper. The team is headed by Fox McCloud. Star Fox 64 fills in the background of the team: at its founding, it was composed of James McCloud, Peppy Hare, and Pigma Dengar, who later betrays the team and sides with Andross. Peppy later retires from active flight duty shortly before Star Fox: Assault and was essentially replaced by Krystal, Fox's love interest. The team's primary aircraft is the Arwing, their land craft is the Landmaster, and the team's mothership is known as the Great Fox. The team is made up of Fox McCloud, Falco Lombardi, Krystal, Slippy Toad, and Peppy Hare.

=== Fox McCloud ===
Fox McCloud (Note: Japanese: フォックス・マクラウド, Hepburn: Fokkusu Makuraudo) is a red fox, the main character of the series, the leader of the team, and James McCloud's son. Fox wears a green suit. When he hears about his father's disappearance, he drops out of the Corneria Defense Force. At the start of the series, Fox is young and still training under Peppy Hare, his father's friend and wingmate. He becomes an expert pilot, skilled in both air and ground-based attacking, as seen in Star Fox: Assault. Fox begins a relationship with Krystal in Star Fox Adventures which continues through Star Fox: Assault and possibly ends in Star Fox: Command when Fox forces her off the team for fear of her safety, though the outcome can change depending on the route and ending.

Fox is also a playable character in all five games in the Super Smash Bros. series. In Super Smash Bros. Brawl, his Final Smash finishing move summoned a Landmaster onto the screen. Fox is also a playable character in the Switch version of Ubisoft's Starlink: Battle for Atlas.

Fox is voiced by Mike West in Star Fox 64, Star Fox 64 3D, Super Smash Bros. 4, Star Fox Zero, Starlink: Battle for Atlas, and Super Smash Bros. Ultimate. The character is voiced in English by Steve Malpass in Star Fox Adventures and Jim Walker in Star Fox: Assault. In the Japanese versions, he is voiced by Shinobu Satouchi in Star Fox 64, Super Smash Bros., and Super Smash Bros. Melee, Kenji Nojima in Star Fox: Assault, Super Smash Bros. Brawl, and Super Smash Bros. for Nintendo 3DS and Wii U, and by Takashi Ohara from Star Fox 64 3D onwards. He is voiced by Glen Powell in The Super Mario Galaxy Movie. Hunter McCoy voices the character in the 2026 remake.

=== Falco Lombardi ===
Falco Lombardi (Note: Japanese: ファルコ・ランバルディ, Hepburn: Faruko Rambarudi) is an avian who appeared in the first Star Fox game for the Super Nintendo Entertainment System. He subsequently appeared in Star Fox 64 for the Nintendo 64. In both games, he serves as a member of the Star Fox team. Falco is a friend of Fox and the team's ace pilot, but he dislikes authority, and his brashness, overconfidence, and tendency to act on his own tend to put him in danger. After the defeat of Andross at the end of Star Fox 64, Falco leaves the Star Fox team and is not seen for a significant time. Falco does not appear during the majority of Star Fox Adventures, as he could not be properly integrated into the plot in time for the game's release. He rejoins the Star Fox team at the end of the game and also appears in Star Fox: Assault, and Star Fox Command.

Falco made his first appearance outside the Star Fox series in Super Smash Bros. Melee with a similar moveset to Fox. He returned for Super Smash Bros. Brawl, where his Final Smash finishing move summoned a Landmaster onto the screen. He returned in Super Smash Bros. for Nintendo 3DS and Wii U and Super Smash Bros. Ultimate as a playable character, trophies, and spirits.

Falco also appears in the Nintendo Switch version of Starlink: Battle for Atlas, along with the other members of the Star Fox team, joining forces with the Starlink team to save Atlas from the Forgotten Legion.

Farewell, Beloved Falco is a manga series that detailed the eight-year gap between Star Fox 64 and Star Fox Adventures. In the manga, Falco receives a request for help from Katt Monroe. At the conclusion of the manga, he stays with Katt Monroe while Fox returns to the team, explaining his departure from the Star Fox team.

In English, Falco was voiced by Bill Johns in Star Fox 64, Star Fox 64 3D, and Star Fox Zero, Ben Cullum in Super Smash Bros. Melee and Star Fox Adventures, Mike Madeoy in Star Fox Assault, and Dex Manley in Super Smash Bros. Brawl. Since 2011, he is consistently voiced by Mark Lund. Andrew Russell voices the character in the 2026 remake.

=== Peppy Hare ===
Peppy Hare (Note: Japanese: ペッピー・ヘア, Hepburn: Peppī Hea) who, despite his last name suggesting otherwise, is a rabbit who wears a red suit and is a member of the original Star Fox team, with leader James McCloud and wingmate Pigma Dengar. After Pigma's betrayal and James' capture, Peppy barely escapes and returns to inform Fox McCloud of his father's fate. Peppy serves as Fox's mentor, giving him instructions and advice throughout the course of the games.

By the time of Star Fox Adventures and Star Fox: Assault, he is retired from flight duty, taking up an advisory position in the Great Fox. According to Star Fox Command, he has a daughter named Lucy and is the widower of his wife Vivian. He is made general of the Corneria Army after Pepper grows ill.

In the Nintendo Power comic, Peppy appears to have some form of extrasensory perception, although it is not elaborated upon.

Peppy's phrase from Star Fox 64, "Do a barrel roll!", has become an internet meme. Google created an Easter egg homage to it in November 2011. Typing "do a barrel roll" or "z or r twice" makes the user's web browser appear to spin. Peppy appears in the Super Smash Bros. series as a collectable trophy.

In English, Peppy was voiced by Rick May in Star Fox 64 and Star Fox 64 3D, Chris Seavor in Super Smash Bros. Melee and Star Fox Adventures, Henry Dardenne in Assault, Dex Manley in Super Smash Bros. Brawl, and Jaz Adams since Star Fox 64 3D. He was originally voiced by Tomohisa Asō in the Japanese versions of the series; starting with Star Fox 64 3D, Kunpei Sakamoto has voiced the character. Erik Braa voices the character in the 2026 remake.

=== Slippy Toad ===
Slippy Toad (Note: Japanese: スリッピー・トード, Hepburn: Surippī Tōdo) is a frog who wears a blue suit. He is a childhood friend of Fox, and they studied together. He serves as the inventor and mechanic of the team. He attended Cornerian Academy, specializing in engineering. Slippy constructs many inventions for the team, including the Blue-Marine, the Landmaster, and the Roadmaster. Due to his lower flying skills compared to his teammates, Slippy Toad tends to fall prey to enemy pilots, and as such calls upon the player for assistance.

After the Aparoid race is destroyed in Star Fox: Assault, he temporarily withdraws from the Star Fox team to spend time with his love interest, a frog named Amanda. However, when Fox needs backup in Star Fox Command, he comes to his assistance. In two endings in Star Fox Command, he and Amanda have children together.

In the SNES game and Nintendo Power comic, Slippy has a croaking stutter, which was removed in later appearances.

Slippy appears in the Super Smash Bros. series as a collectable trophy. He makes a cameo appearance in Super Smash Bros. Brawl as one of Solid Snake's contacts on his Codec and sometimes a contact for Fox, Falco, or Wolf with a taunt on the Star Fox battlefield.

He is voiced in English by Lyssa Browne in Star Fox 64, Star Fox 64 3D, and Star Fox Zero and all subsequent games since 2011, Chris Seavor in Super Smash Bros. Melee and Star Fox Adventures, and Mike McAuliffe in Star Fox: Assault and Super Smash Bros. Brawl. He is voiced by Kyoko Tongu in the early Japanese versions of the series; in Star Fox 64 3D and Star Fox Zero, he is voiced by Kei Hayami. Jeremy Adams voices the character in the 2026 remake.

=== Krystal ===
Krystal (Note: Japanese: クリスタル, Hepburn: Kurisutaru) is a calm and kindhearted blue vixen who is the sole survivor of her doomed home planet, Cerinia. She first appears in Star Fox Adventures, where she searches for answers on her planet's destruction and the death of her parents. She is playable in the game's prologue before being captured by General Scales. She later joins Star Fox as the team's telepath after the adventure and becomes a full member of the team in Star Fox: Assault. Before the start of Star Fox Command, Krystal leaves the Star Fox team after a strained relationship with Fox. Several possible endings show her returning to both, including one where she marries Fox and their son Marcus leads a new Star Fox team decades in the future. Other endings see her leave Fox and join Star Wolf, including one where she becomes a bounty hunter.

She first appears in the early concept of Dinosaur Planet as one of two playable characters. Her original design was that of a 16-year-old, who was raised by a wizard named Randorn. When it was retooled as a Star Fox game, Fox became the main character of Star Fox Adventures. Krystal was redesigned to be older and her role in the game became less central.

Krystal was considered for inclusion as a playable fighter in Super Smash Bros. Brawl. The development team ultimately added Wolf to the game instead because he could be implemented in less time. Krystal still makes a cameo appearance as one of the contacts for Fox, Falco, or Wolf with a taunt on the Lylat Cruise stage. She appears as a collectable trophy in several of the games and as an Assist Trophy in Super Smash Bros. Ultimate.

In English versions of the series, Krystal speaks Estuary English and is voiced by Estelle Ellis in Star Fox Adventures, and by Alésia Glidewell in Star Fox: Assault, Super Smash Bros. Brawl and Super Smash Bros. Ultimate. In the Japanese version of Assault, Krystal is voiced by Aya Hara.

=== Other members ===
In Star Fox 2, completed in 1995 but officially released in 2017, two female characters Miyu, (Note: Japanese: ミユ) a lynx in a red suit, and Fay, (Note: Japanese: フェイ, Hepburn: Fei) a white dog in a blue suit, were added to the Star Fox team; neither of them were featured in games released after the making of Star Fox 2. Dylan Cuthbert stated that he gave Miyu that name because he liked how it sounded, and that he named Fay after a crush he had in childhood prior to his teenage years. Cuthbert stated he did not remember whether he gave family names to Miyu and Fay.

The Nintendo Power's Star Fox comic by Benimaru Itoh exclusively introduced the character Fara Phoenix, a Fennec fox, as a love interest for Fox, starting off as a Cornerian test pilot and later becoming an unofficial member.

==== ROB 64 ====
ROB 64 (known as NUS64 (Note: Japanese: ナウス64, Hepburn: Nausu Rokujūyon) in the original Japanese-language version) is the observation and analysis robot aboard Great Fox, Star Fox's mothership. ROB's name is a reference to the NES accessory R.O.B. The 64 is derived from the console of his first appearance, the Nintendo 64. ROB's Japanese name, "NUS", stands for "Nintendo Ultra Sixty-Four", the original name and of the Nintendo 64 system, and the model prefix that is a part of the serial number of all N64 components: the controller, for example, is NUS-005.

ROB is hardwired directly into the ship's computer and has the ability to control the Great Fox, piloting it, providing information to the team, and aiding them with supply drops. Prior to Star Fox Adventures, he has been rebuilt several times by Slippy Toad, which has affected his reliability. After the first Great Fox is destroyed in Star Fox: Assault, he returns in Star Fox Command piloting the new version of the Great Fox. On some paths in the game, ROB joins Star Wolf when no "hero" character is available.

In Star Fox Zero, a tethered robot similar in appearance, Direct-i, also assists in operation of the Gyrowing and Roadmaster.

ROB is voiced in English by David Frederick White in Star Fox 64 and all subsequent games since 2011, John Silke in Star Fox Adventures, and Dex Manley in Star Fox: Assault. He is voiced by Daisuke Sakaguchi in the Japanese version of Star Fox 64, Yusuke Numata in Star Fox: Assault, and Atsushi Abe in Star Fox 64 3D. Brandon Hunt voices the character in the 2026 remake. ROB makes a cameo appearance in Super Smash Bros. Brawl as a collectable trophy.

==== Prince Tricky ====
Tricky (Note: Japanese: トリッキー, Hepburn: Torikkī) is the young Styracosaurus prince of the EarthWalker Tribe from the planet Sauria. He serves as Fox's companion in Star Fox Adventures, in which Tricky performs various tasks for Fox, such as digging or breathing fire. He is made an honorary Star Fox member at the end of Adventures. He returns in Star Fox: Assault to defend Sauria from the Aparoid attack. In this appearance, Tricky has matured and is now the king of the EarthWalker Tribe. After Fox and Krystal save his kingdom from the Aparoids, he promises to help repair Sauria.

He was voiced by Kevin Bayliss in Star Fox Adventures and Chet Morgan in Star Fox: Assault. In the Japanese version of Star Fox: Assault, he is voiced by Hirohiko Kakegawa, who also voiced Beltino and James McCloud in the same game. Tricky also cameos in Super Smash Bros. Brawl as a collectible trophy.

Tricky was originally intended to be the same character as "Tricky the Triceratops" in Diddy Kong Racing. Nintendo now owns the rights to the Tricky character.

== Star Wolf ==
Star Wolf (Note: Japanese: スターウルフ, Hepburn: Sutā Urufu) is a group of mercenaries originally created and hired by Andross to eliminate the Star Fox team. They have since been working on their own as Star Fox's rival team, occasionally helping Star Fox in Star Fox: Assault. Their primary aircraft is the Wolfen. Though Star Wolf were planned to appear in the canceled Star Fox 2, they first appeared in Star Fox 64.

They have appeared in every game except for the original Star Fox and Star Fox Adventures. In Star Fox 64 and Star Fox Zero, the team is composed of Wolf O'Donnell, Leon Powalski, ex-Star Fox team member Pigma Dengar, and Andross' nephew Andrew Oikonny, while in Star Fox: Assault and Star Fox Command, the team is composed of Wolf O'Donnell, Leon Powalski, and Panther Caroso.

=== Wolf O'Donnell ===
Wolf O'Donnell (Note: Japanese: ウルフ・オドネル, Hepburn: Urufu Odoneru) (sometimes called Lord O'Donnell) is a wolf, the leader of Star Wolf team, and Fox's rival, fueled by his prior rivalry with his father, James. He was said to be skillfully goaded by Pigma Dengar into forming Star Wolf and working for Andross to take down the Star Fox team. After the Star Wolf team fails their mission and the Venom army is destroyed, Wolf and his team go their separate ways.

Wolf is made a playable fighter in the Super Smash Bros. series, starting with Super Smash Bros. Brawl. In the game, he has a similar moveset to Fox and Falco, and his Final Smash is a Landmaster. He returns in Super Smash Bros. Ultimate with a refined moveset.

In English, Wolf was voiced by Jock Blaney in Star Fox 64, Grant Goodeve in Star Fox: Assault, Jay Ward in Super Smash Bros. Brawl, Star Fox Zero, Starlink: Battle for Atlas and Super Smash Bros. Ultimate, and Mike West in Star Fox 64 3D. In the Japanese versions, Wolf is voiced by Hisao Egawa in Star Fox 64, Mahito Oba in Star Fox: Assault and Super Smash Bros. Brawl, and Kosuke Takaguchi in Star Fox 64 3D, Star Fox Zero, Starlink: Battle for Atlas, and Super Smash Bros. Ultimate. Samuel Drake voices the character in the 2026 remake.

=== Leon Powalski ===
Leon Powalski (Note: Japanese: レオン・ポワルスキー, Hepburn: Reon Powarusukī) is a chameleon who is a member of the Star Wolf team, and is the only member other than Wolf that has been on the team since its creation. Leon's past is unknown, with no records of him belonging to any prior organization. He is believed to be an alien that migrated from another star system and seems to be motivated by the opportunity to inflict pain and suffering on his victims. Leon has a customized ship called the Rainbow Delta.

He has an ongoing rivalry with Falco Lombardi, whom he mainly concentrates on during dogfights in Star Fox 64 and taunts mercilessly within Star Fox: Assault.

Leon's English personality has changed noticeably since Star Fox 64. He has gone from a calm and sinister demeanor to a crazed, ruthless assassin who exhibits a deranged laugh after defeating a foe. His personality in Star Fox Command seems to contradict his cold-blooded image. It is implied that, beneath his facade, he has a soft spot for peace. This is hinted at in his profile in the Pilot Gallery and his rejoicing after defeating the Anglar Emperor, as he claims that he will look forward to parades with flowers and other such niceties.

In English, he was voiced by Jay Green in Star Fox 64 (1997) and all subsequent games since 2011, except for Star Fox: Assault, where he was voiced by David Scully, and Super Smash Bros. Brawl, where he was voiced by Jim Walker. He was voiced by Shinobu Satouchi in most of the Japanese versions and by Takashi Ohara in Star Fox 64 3D and Star Fox Zero. Griffin Puatu voices the character in the 2026 remake. He appears in the Super Smash Bros. series as a collectable trophy.

=== Pigma Dengar ===
Pigma Dengar (Note: Japanese: ピグマ・デンガー, Hepburn: Piguma Dengā) is a pig who was one of the original members of the Star Fox team. He is a greedy pirate and mechanic with a twisted personality, who is willing to deceive others and does not care who he hurts so long as he is paid. Pigma is also sadistic, as evidenced by his introductory quote from the Bolse level. Said to be a researcher under Andross' direct supervision during his time at the Corneria Defense Force Scientific Research Institute, he eventually schemes with Andross to betray the Star Fox team, causing the presumed death of James McCloud. Afterwards, he persuades Wolf to create and lead the Star Wolf team, secretly manipulating him and his team in accordance with Andross' orders. When fighting Star Fox in Star Fox 64, Pigma targets Peppy due to their previously having been teammates. Pigma is also said to have created the Star Fox team emblem, as well as, in collaboration with Andross, custom engineering the Wolfen for the Star Wolf team to utilize.

Pigma is later fired from Star Wolf by Wolf O'Donnell for his greed and treachery. He attempts to profit off an Aparoid Memory Cube in Star Fox: Assault. As a result of his greed, he undergoes Aparoid assimilation, which fuses him with a spacecraft, before Fox McCloud defeats him, causing him to explode. He returns and serves as a boss in Star Fox Command, revealing that he survived the previous encounter as a cube-shaped cyborg. Whether the player encounters him depends on decisions made during gameplay.

According to Star Fox Zero, Pigma Dengar managed to volunteer as a member of Star Fox shortly before betraying the team. In Star Fox Guard, he is shown to have some degree of mechanical expertise. He appears in the Super Smash Bros. series as a collectable trophy. In Star Fox 2, Pigma remains a member of Star Wolf.

In English, Pigma was voiced by David Frederick White in Star Fox 64 (1997) and all subsequent games since 2011, except for Star Fox: Assault, where he was voiced by Lev Liberman. He was voiced by Daisuke Gōri in the early Japanese versions, and Tsuguo Mogami in the Japanese version of Star Fox 64 3D, Star Fox Zero, and Star Fox Guard. Mick Lauer voices the character in the 2026 remake.

In the Japanese version of Star Fox 64, Pigma speaks in the Kansai dialect. His last name refers to the way people who speak in Kansai often end their sentences with "dengar". The name, "Pigma", is a spin on the word dogma, pointing to his antidogmatic nature.

=== Andrew Oikonny ===
Andrew Oikonny (Note: Japanese: アンドリュー・オイッコニー, Hepburn: Andoryū Oikkonī) is a monkey who is the nephew of Andross. In Star Fox 64, Andross is said to have effectively forced Pigma to include him on the team in order to get him out of the way. He is not a good pilot or fighter. His elitist attitude has also made him unpopular with his crew mates; Wolf tolerates him because of his connection to Andross. In battle, he primarily targets Slippy.

Sometime after Andross is destroyed, Oikonny is kicked out of Star Wolf. From there, he plans to avenge his uncle's death by gathering the remnants of the Venom army to stage a rebellion against Corneria. This is seen in the beginning of Star Fox: Assault, where Oikonny pilots a ship that resembles Andross' head, before a large Aparoid destroys it.

He returns in Star Fox Command, where he joins the Anglars and pilots the Death Crab. He once again attempts to get revenge on Fox and confronts him and his team in Fichina. He appears in the Super Smash Bros. series as a collectable trophy.

In English, he was voiced by Bill Johns in Star Fox 64 (1997), John Hugil in Star Fox: Assault (2005), and Mike West in all subsequent games since 2011. In the Japanese versions of the series, he is voiced by Daisuke Sakaguchi in Star Fox 64, Yūsuke Numata in Star Fox: Assault, and Atsushi Abe in Star Fox 64 3D and Star Fox Zero.

=== Panther Caroso ===
Panther Caroso (known as Panther Caluroso (Note: Japanese: パンサー・カルロッソ, Hepburn: Pansā Karurosso) in Japanese-language versions) is a black panther who makes his first appearance as the newest member of Star Wolf in Star Fox: Assault. His signature symbol, which is on his Wolfen, is a red rose. Panther is conceited and a flirt, considering himself a ladies' man. In the game, he unsuccessfully tries to flirt with Krystal several times.

Panther reappears in Star Fox Command, where he attempts to begin a relationship with Krystal after she joins the Star Wolf team following her breakup with Fox. In the English version of Command, Panther speaks in the third person, despite his normal speaking habits in Star Fox: Assault.

He was voiced in English by David Scully, who also voiced Leon, in Star Fox: Assault (2005), and Eric Newsome in Super Smash Bros. Brawl (2008). In Japanese, he is voiced by Tetsu Inada in Star Fox: Assault and Super Smash Bros. Brawl. He makes a cameo appearance as a collectable trophy in the Super Smash Bros. series.

In Star Fox 2, the Star Wolf team includes a member named Algy, who appears to be a lemur (specifically an aye-aye).

== Other villains ==
=== Andross ===
Andross (known as Andorf (Note: Japanese: アンドルフ, Hepburn: Andorufu) in the Japanese versions) is the main antagonist of the series, directly appearing in every game except for Star Fox: Assault, and has been Fox McCloud's archenemy ever since his defeat against him at the end of the Lylat Wars.

Before the series, Andross was a scientist working for Corneria. His original intentions are supposedly pure and benevolent. However, a growing obsession with his engine and bio-technology drives him to the brink of madness. The increasing perversion of his experiments results in unleashing a deadly weapon within a Cornerian city. He is then captured by General Pepper and banished to the wasteland planet Venom, where he converts the planet into a giant military base. He declares himself emperor and begins invading the neighboring worlds. In the 2026 remake for the Nintendo Switch 2, however, it indicated that he already possessed severe entitlement issues and a pathological desire for recognition even early into his career.

After defeating James McCloud of the original Star Fox team, a new team is formed under Fox McCloud. He is the final boss in Star Fox 64. Andross is shown to have apparently experimented on himself and become a giant disembodied head.

However, Andross' spirit survives, though weakened. He travels to Sauria and manipulates General Scales in order to restore himself to full power. He serves as the final boss of the game.

He does not appear in Star Fox: Assault, but his nephew Andrew Oikonny, pilots a robotic copy of his uncle's head as the game's first boss. He reappears in Star Fox Command as a ghost in control of a bio-weapon, but is no longer a threat.

According to Star Fox Zero, Andross secretly worked on a Cornerian teleportation device for peacekeeping purposes, but his lust for power made him claim it as his own. After discovering the truth, General Pepper and James McCloud used the teleporter to exile Andross to another dimension.

In Star Fox 2, a direct sequel to the original game, Andross is revealed to have survived his encounter with Fox McCloud. As his army advances towards Corneria, the Star Fox team scrambles to destroy Andross once again.

Andross appears in several different forms throughout the Star Fox series. In the first game, he takes the form of a large metallic head. Starting with Star Fox 64, he has a giant ape-like head. In Star Fox 2, he looks more disheveled and has a cybernetic implant over the left side of his head.

Andross appears throughout the Super Smash Bros. series as a collectible trophy and also as an Assist Trophy character.

Andross was voiced by Rick May in the English version of Star Fox 64. He was voiced by Daisuke Gōri in the Japanese version of Star Fox 64 and by Tsuguo Mogami in Star Fox 64 3D and Star Fox Zero. Hunter Peterson voices the character in the 2026 remake.

=== Captain Shears ===
Captain Shears (Note: Japanese: シールズ大佐, Hepburn: Shīruzu Taisa) is a dog who appears in the manga Star Fox: Farewell, Beloved Falco, which was released on the official Star Fox Adventures Japanese website. Shears conducts his operations in a base on Titania. Working as a double agent, he tells the Star Fox team he and his group of scientists are planning to reconstruct Andross's research, claiming there may still be Venom soldiers on the planet. Katt Monroe does not trust him and tells Falco of Shears' plan, leading to a dogfight between Fox and Falco that Fox wins.

The Star Fox team and Katt's gang team up and learn Shears is not planning to reconstruct Andross' research, but to resurrect Andross. Fox storms into Shears' base and fights him. After losing, Shears attempts to escape, only to be crushed to death under the weight of the newly constructed Andross.

=== General Scales ===
General Scales (Note: Japanese: スケール将軍, Hepburn: Sukēru Shōgun) appears in Star Fox Adventures. He is leader of the SharpClaw Tribe, which strives to be the ruling tribe of Sauria. After being rejected by the other tribes, General Scales amasses an army of Sharpclaws, breaks apart the planet by removing the four SpellStones, and has his army occupy each chunk. Andross gives him power in return for capturing Krystal and the Krazoa Spirits, while keeping himself relatively unknown to Scales. At the end of the game, Andross stops the fight between Scales and Fox and has him relinquish the last Krazoa spirit to Fox and collapses.

General Scales is voiced by John Silke.

=== Aparoid Queen ===
The Aparoid Queen (Note: Japanese: アパロイドマザー, Hepburn: Aparoido Mazā; Aparoid Mother) is the leader of the Aparoid race and the primary antagonist of Star Fox: Assault. From within the Aparoid Homeworld, the Queen rules over the Aparoids like a queen bee over her hive. She can emulate the personalities of people who are infected, or people close to her enemies. When directly confronted, she attempts to convince the Star Fox team to give in and describes the assimilation as "not sacrifice, but evolution". She also believes that everything in the universe exists for the Aparoids or herself. The Star Fox team makes its way into the Queen's chamber and infects her with a self-destruct program, killing all the Aparoids.

The Aparoid and their queen are represented in the Super Smash Bros. series as collectable trophies.

=== Anglar Emperor ===
The Anglar Emperor (Note: Japanese: アングラー皇帝, Hepburn: Angurā Kōtei) is the leader of the Anglar race, and the primary antagonist of Star Fox Command. Originating on Venom, he appears as a final boss for several missions. He pilots a large serpent-like creature known as the Arrowhead. In some missions, he becomes a very large angler fish, capable of taking the player's ship into his mouth, which is reminiscent of an attack used by Andross in other games. It is implied that the Anglar race was created by Andross.

== Supporting characters ==
=== General Pepper ===
General Pepper (Note: Japanese: ペパー将軍, Hepburn: Pepā Shōgun) is the bloodhound Commander-in-chief of the Corneria Defense Force. He was previously Peppy and James's commanding officer.

He originally exiles Andross to Venom and hires the Star Fox team to investigate it five years later. Two years later, he becomes the primary source for the new Star Fox's missions. Pepper assigned Star Fox to investigate Dinosaur Planet (Sauria) in Star Fox Adventures. He also offers assistance and keeps track of your progress over the course of the game.

During the Aparoid invasion in Star Fox: Assault, Pepper nearly dies when the Aparoids fuse to him and his flagship. At the General's command, Fox destroys the ship with Pepper still on board, but he is rescued by Peppy Hare. Afterwards, Pepper grows ill and retires his position as general of the Corneria Army, passing the role on to his friend Peppy Hare prior to the events of Star Fox Command.

In English, he is voiced by David Frederick White in Star Fox 64, Star Fox 64 3D, and Star Fox Zero, John Silke in Star Fox Adventures, and Gray Eubank in Assault. In the Japanese version of Star Fox 64, he was voiced by Daisuke Gōri, Michihiro Ikemizu in Star Fox: Assault, and currently by Tsuguo Mogami in Star Fox 64 3D and Star Fox Zero. Erik Braa voices the character in the 2026 remake.

=== James McCloud ===
James McCloud (Note: Japanese: ジェームズ・マクラウド, Hepburn: Jēmuzu Makuraudo) is Fox's father and the original leader and main founder of the Star Fox team. In Star Fox for SNES, it is stated that Fox's father is missing and was last seen at a black hole. However, the Black Hole is actually a warp point that was created by Andross' experiments.

According to Star Fox 64, he paid for the Great Fox with a low-interest, 80-year mortgage. On a scouting mission to Venom, he was betrayed by his teammate named Pigma Dengar and is captured by the evil Andross. He appears to Fox McCloud at the end of the game to lead Fox out of Andross's exploding base. The 2026 Star Fox remake adds a prologue to the game that features James' mission to Venom.

James makes his first playable appearance in Command, piloting an Arwing. None of the other characters acknowledge him and Fox questions if he is seeing things. He also appears in Star Fox Zero as a spirit.

James appears in Super Smash Bros. for 3DS as a collectable trophy. James is also the name of a character in the F-Zero series. The instruction booklet for F-Zero X describes him as working to raise money for the debts of his mercenary organization, "Galaxy Dog". He also uses a racing car similar to an Arwing.

James was voiced by Tomohisa Asō in Star Fox 64, and by Hirohiko Kakegawa in Star Fox: Assault. In Star Fox 64 3D, James is voiced by Kunpei Sakamoto. In English, he was voiced by Mike West in Star Fox 64, Star Fox 64 3D, and Star Fox Zero, and by Jim Walker in Assault. Hunter Peterson voices the character in the 2026 remake.

=== Katt Monroe ===
Katt Monroe (Note: Japanese: キャット・モンロー, Hepburn: Kyatto Monrō; lit. "Cat Monroe") is a female pilot and an old acquaintance of Falco from their days as a part of a space gang known as "FREE-AS-A-BIRD". She comes to the aid of the Corneria Defense Force and the Star Fox team. Katt resembles a cat, and appears with pink fur in Star Fox 64 and Star Fox Zero, but appears in Star Fox Command with black fur. She pilots an advanced military ship that she stole from Andross.

She appears in Star Fox 64 on the planet Zoness, and will either appear to defend the Great Fox in Sector Z, or shoot switches on Macbeth. She has a crush on Falco Lombardi, wishing to join Star Fox to be close to him. In Star Fox Command, she appears in missions with Falco in the Asteroid Belt and Sector X. She and Falco have an argument in which Falco insults her and Katt vows to never help him again, though she still comes to his aid later in the storyline. In one of the game's alternate endings, she and Falco form the Star Falco mercenary group.

In the manga, "Farewell, Beloved Falco", Katt appears to have a romantic relationship with Kool, another cat with blue fur. Though she implies she likes him, she still shows a liking for Falco.

Katt is voiced by Kyōko Tongū in the Japanese version of Star Fox 64, and Kei Hayami in the Japanese version of Star Fox 64 3D and Star Fox Zero. In English, she is voiced by Lyssa Browne. Brittany Cox voices the character in the 2026 remake.

=== Beltino Toad ===
Beltino Toad (Note: Japanese: ベルツィーノ・トード, Hepburn: Berutsīno Tōdo) is Slippy Toad's father. He serves as the director of Engineering at Space Dynamics Co. Ltd., and later serves as the research director for the Cornerian Defense Forces. He and Slippy construct many inventions for the Star Fox team, including the Blue-Marine and the Landmaster. Beltino is first mentioned in the Star Fox 64 Player's Guide, but does not make an in-game appearance until Star Fox: Assault. Beltino discovers the way to defeat the Aparoids, and Star Fox destroys them using a program he developed. In the English version of Assault, Beltino Toad is voiced by Scott Burns, and his Japanese voice actor is Hirohiko Kakegawa.

=== Amanda Toad ===
Amanda Toad (Note: Japanese: アマンダ・トード, Hepburn: Amanda Tōdo) is Slippy's fiancée, who first appears in Star Fox Command. They meet two years prior to the events of Star Fox Command, and fall in love. Amanda occasionally helps the team out. She pilots the Tadpole, (Note: Japanese: タッドポール, Hepburn: Taddopōru) a ship armed with a multi-lock. She considers herself more of the leader in her relationship with Slippy, and always wants to be on his side during a fight. In two endings, she and Slippy settle down with children, one of whom joins Fox and Krystal's son, Marcus, as well as Lucy Hare's daughter and Falco Lombardi in forming a new Star Fox team. In another ending, she joins the Star Fox team to be close to Slippy.

=== Bill Grey ===
Bill Grey (Note: Japanese: ビル・グレイ, Hepburn: Biru Gurei) is a dog who is Fox's friend and appears to help him in Star Fox 64, Star Fox Command, and Star Fox Zero. The two were originally in training together in the Cornerian Defense Academy, and after Fox leaves to join Star Fox, Bill rises to the rank of squadron commander of the Cornerian Air Force. He is now tasked with the defense of Katina Base and will assist Fox there. The name of the character is a reference to General William Grey from the 1996 blockbuster film Independence Day, which the battle on Katina in Star Fox 64 greatly resembles.

Bill is voiced by Jock Blaney in the English version of Star Fox 64 and by Jaz Adams in the English versions of Star Fox 64 3D and Star Fox Zero. In the Japanese versions, he is voiced by Daisuke Sakaguchi in Star Fox 64 and by Atsushi Abe in Star Fox 64 3D and Star Fox Zero. Samuel Drake voices the character in the 2026 remake.

=== Dash Bowman ===
Dash Bowman, known as Ash Bowman (Note: Japanese: アッシュ・ボウマン, Hepburn: Asshu Bōman) in the Japanese version, is a monkey who is a young pilot for the Corneria Army, as well as the grandson of Andross and cousin once removed to Andrew Oikonny. He thinks very highly of Fox and Falco, and wishes to join the Star Fox team. He makes his first appearance in Star Fox Command. Despite his grandfather's dark ways, he still appreciates his forgotten aspirations, and wishes to carry on his legacy of making Lylat a better place. Dash's future remains uncertain. One ending shows him joining Falco and Katt to form the Star Falco team, while another two show him becoming ruler of Venom. One of the latter shows him converting Venom into a peaceful planet and the other has him becoming corrupt with power like Andross.

=== Lucy Hare ===
Lucy Hare (Note: Japanese: ルーシー・ヘア, Hepburn: Rūshī Hea) is a rabbit who debuts in Star Fox Command, and is Peppy Hare's only daughter. Her mother Vivian Hare (Note: Japanese: ビビアン・ヘア, Hepburn: Bibian Hea) died shortly after the Lylat Wars due to an illness. She is a bit of a tomboy, but is still very polite to her elders. She is an astrophysics teacher on the planet Fichina, but wants to become a pilot like her father. She and Krystal are good friends. In some missions, she fights the Anglar attackers in her aircraft, the Sky Bunny, (Note: Japanese: スカイバニー, Hepburn: Sukai Banī) armed with plasma lasers and a single lock. In one of the endings, her daughter becomes a member of the new Star Fox team, led by Marcus, Fox's son.

=== Marcus McCloud ===
Marcus McCloud (Note: Japanese: マーカス・マクラウド, Hepburn: Mākasu Makuraudo) is the son of Fox McCloud and Krystal and the leader of a potential future Star Fox team, filling his father's position and, therefore, that of his grandfather, James McCloud. The team also includes Peppy Hare's granddaughter, one of Slippy Toad's sons, and an aging Falco Lombardi. Marcus physically resembles his father but has blue fur like his mother. His piloting skills are comparable to those of his grandfather and father.

== Reception ==
When reviewing Star Fox Adventures, GameSpot reviewer Greg Kasavin commented that the game has a likable cast of characters who manage to be cute and pretty cool at the same time.
