= Teiya Ichiryusai =

Japanese voice actress

- 一龍斎 貞弥
- Born: February 2, 1968 (age 58)
- Occupation: Voice actress
- Agent: Aoni Production

Teiya Ichiryusai (一龍斎 貞弥, Ichiryūsai Teiya; born February 2, 1968) is a Japanese voice actress from Ōita Prefecture affiliated with Aoni Production. Her former stage name is Aya Hara (原 亜弥, Hara Aya).

== Filmography ==
=== Anime television ===
- Case Closed (Tivoli garden receptionist) (episode 377)
- Galaxy Fraulein Yuna (Mai Tokudaiji)
- Galaxy Fraulein Yuna Returns (Mai of Roppogni)
- Perfect Blue (Mima's mother)
- Sailor Moon (Phantom of the Lake) (episode 40)
- The Super Dimension Fortress Macross II: Lovers, Again (Saori)

=== Video games ===
- Galaxy Fraulein Yuna series (Mai of Roppogni)
- Lunar: Silver Star Story (Lemia Ausa, Xenobia)
- Star Fox: Assault (Krystal)
- Super Smash Bros. Brawl (Krystal, Isaac)
- Super Smash Bros. Ultimate (Krystal, Isaac)
