= Dex Manley =

American voice actor

Dexter Manley is an American commercial and video game voice actor. He has worked on 300 commercials and 25 video games. He worked extensively for Nintendo, providing voices for many Mario and Donkey Kong games; and for Microsoft, Boeing Company, Alaska Airlines, and others. Manley has also lent his voice twice to the Star Fox series, voicing ROB 64 in Star Fox: Assault. He appeared as a host on 2005 SIGGRAPH meeting, where he discussed voice acting topics. He is the president of Tenacious Media, media and marketing company operating in Seattle, Washington, and is also a film actor, usually filming in independent films.

== Known video game work ==
- Backyard Hockey - Buddy Cheque
- Backyard Basketball - Barry DeJay
- Kakuto Chojin: Back Alley Brutal - J.D. Stone
- Mario & Sonic at the London 2012 Olympic Games – Lakitu
- Moonbase Commander - DeWulf
- Moop and Dreadly in the Treasure on Bing Bong Island - Moop
- Ollo in the Sunny Valley Fair - Wally/Brawny/Farmer Franklin
- Saw - Jeff Thomas Ridenhour
- Sin Episodes: Emergence - Various
- Spy Fox in "Dry Cereal" - Hong Kong Doodle, Weasel Doorman
- Star Fox: Assault - ROB 64
- Starsiege - Squadmate #5
- Super Smash Bros. Brawl - Falco Lombardi, Peppy Hare

== Filmography ==
- Cage the Dog - Bobby
- Unsung - Bruce
- Bloody Mary - Luther
- Bullets, Blood & a Fistful of Ca$h - Tommy Two Toes
- Son of Terror - Undertaker
- Nowhere Man - Mike Jordache
- Movie Pizza Love - Martin
- Mondo Scooterama - Stooge
- Bite Size - Douglas Peatry's Father
- The Taken - Chip
