= Fox McCloud =

Character in Star Fox video games

- Star Fox character
- Fox McCloud in Star Fox Zero
- First game: Star Fox (1993)
- Created by: Shigeru Miyamoto
- Designed by: Takaya Imamura
- Voiced by: English: Daniel Owsen (1993, 2015); Mike West (1997, 2011-2014, 2016-2018); Steve Malpass (2001-2002); Jim Walker (2005-2008); Joe Zieja (2016); Glen Powell (2026); Hunter McCoy (2026-present); Japanese: Shinobu Satouchi (1997-2001); Kenji Nojima (2005-2008, 2014); Takashi Ōhara (2011, 2016-2018); Eiji Takeuchi (2026-present)

In-universe information
- Species: Red fox

Fox McCloud (Japanese: フォックス・マクラウド, Hepburn: Fokkusu Makuraudo) is the main protagonist of Nintendo's Star Fox series. He is an anthropomorphic red fox created by Shigeru Miyamoto and designed by Takaya Imamura. Fox first appeared as the playable character in the 1993 video game Star Fox. Across the series, the player controls Fox as he pilots his spacecraft, the Arwing, with gameplay varying by title. He serves as the leader of the Star Fox team, undertaking missions alongside his teammates. Fox has appeared in other video game franchises, including as a playable character in the Super Smash Bros. fighting games. In the 2026 film The Super Mario Galaxy Movie, he is voiced by Glen Powell.

During the development of the original Star Fox, Miyamoto sought to enhance player engagement beyond the core gameplay by introducing a cast of characters, with Fox as the central protagonist. The character was partly inspired by Miyamoto's visit to the Fushimi Inari Shrine in Kyoto, Japan, which has numerous fox statues. Miyamoto relayed this concept to Imamura, who developed Fox’s visual design. Elements of Fox's personality and facial features were based on Miyamoto.

Fox McCloud has been regarded as one of the most recognizable characters in video games. In the Super Smash Bros. competitive play, especially in Super Smash Bros. Melee, he is often considered one of the strongest characters. His prominence in competitive play contributed to the popularization of the phrase "No items, Fox only, Final Destination", an internet meme used to parody highly competitive playstyles, which has since spread beyond the Super Smash Bros. series. His appearance in The Super Mario Galaxy Movie was met with mixed responses; though Powell's performance was praised, many critics questioned his inclusion in the film's plot.

== Appearances ==
=== In Star Fox series ===
Fox is the main protagonist of the Star Fox series, serving as the team's leader and the franchise's main protagonist. Following in his deceased father James McCloud's footsteps as a mercenary, Fox is a highly skilled pilot and combatant. Cocky and playful, Fox has a strong loyalty to his team.

Fox first appears in 1993's Star Fox for the Super NES as the leader of Team Star Fox, alongside Falco, Slippy, and Peppy. He and his team face off against the antagonist Andross and his empire, who seek to conquer the galaxy. He and his team appear in 1997 game Star Fox 64 and its two remakes, Star Fox 64 3D (2011) and Star Fox (2026), fighting against Andross as well as other enemies such as Wolf O'Donnell, Fox's rival.

Fox appears in a prequel comic released prior to the 2002 game Star Fox Adventures. In the game, Fox fights on the ground, helping Dinosaur Planet and a vixen named Krystal against an attack by General Scales, allying with triceratops Prince Tricky, and eventually culminating in a fight against Andross. In 2005's Star Fox: Assault, Fox works alongside a number of allies to fight against the threat of the Aparoid race, a species who seeks to assimilate all life into itself. 2006's Star Fox Command, sees Fox fighting against the Anglar Empire, now without his team as a result of them splitting paths.

As Command has nine different outcomes, it is uncertain which is the true path Fox and crew take, and even whether or not Command is even canon to the series. Despite this, the developers have suggested that any sequel might ignore the nine endings and instead pick up the story from the middle. Fox appears in the 2016 game Star Fox Zero, a reimagining of Star Fox 64, where he seeks to defeat Andross once more. He appears in 2017 game Star Fox 2, an initially scrapped game that was intended for release for the SNES.

=== In other media ===
Outside of the Star Fox series, Fox McCloud has appeared in all five Super Smash Bros. games as a playable character. His stage is outside of his ship. Fox makes an appearance in the 2018 game Starlink: Battle for Atlas, where he is a playable character in its Nintendo Switch version. Costumes based on Fox are unlockable in the games Bayonetta 2 (2014) and the Wii U port of Tekken Tag Tournament 2. Fox appears in the 2026 animated film The Super Mario Galaxy Movie, where he plays a major role in the film. Having arrived in Mario's universe via interdimensional travel through a black hole, he aids Mario in defeating Bowser and Bowser Jr., the main antagonists of the sequel.

== Concept and design ==
=== Creation and conception ===
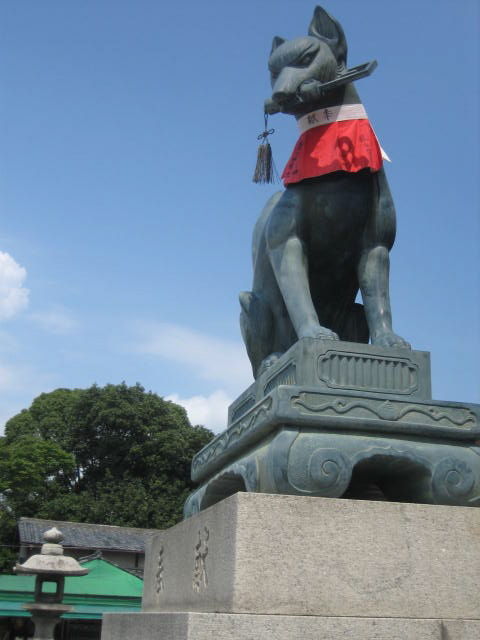
A fox holding a key in its mouth, at the main gate of the Fushimi Inari shrine

In 1992, Nintendo and British company Argonaut Software collaborated to produce a 3D space shooter for the Super NES, provisionally titled 'SnesGlider'. The development team, led by Shigeru Miyamoto, redesigned what had been a tech demo into a rail shooter, from Nintendo designing the game and Argonaut handling the programming aspects. However, without a story, it lacked any incentive to play beyond flying and shooting. Miyamoto sketched out a universe but could not decide on a "natural hero" to convey a sense of an epic space saga, and a variety of names were under consideration early in development while this was being hashed out. Miyamoto eventually landed on a fox as a potential design after visiting the Fushimi Inari Shrine in Kyoto, creating the concept behind Fox and the other Star Fox pilots.

Fox and the other characters were subsequently visually designed by Takaya Imamura. Imamura initially intended to draw the characters in-line with the artstyle of a prior game he worked on, F-Zero, and was surprised by Miyamoto's suggestion to make the cast animals. After checking with Argonaut to see the popularity of animal characters overseas, Imamura went ahead with designing the cast. According to Dylan Cuthbert, a programmer working with Argonaut, Fox's inclusion in the original game came late into development, only a few months before the original game's launch. Imamura believed that the anthropomorphic styling of the characters, including Fox, helped players feel empathy towards the characters in Star Fox. Cuthbert noted that the animal designs gave the game a more "Nintendo vibe", as before the game had drawn upon the gritty style of British science-fiction due to it being developed by Argonaut. He stated that Miyamoto felt that the Japanese audience was not ready for that style, and the characters would help make the game more successful on the market. Personalities of the various main team members were based on staff members, with Fox's personality being based on Miyamoto. According to Imamura, Fox's face was also based on Miyamoto's. Fox's name was suggested by Cuthbert. According to Cuthbert, Miyamoto showed him the characters, and off the top of his head, named all of them except for Falco. Fox's last name, McCloud, was a play on the traditional Scottish Gaelic name McLeod. During development, Fox's design remained more or less unchanged from his original concept design. Though initially members of the army of the planet that appears, Fox and his team were eventually made into members of a mercenary unit after Miyamoto's suggestion to make the team members "outlaws".

Fox and other Star Fox members have legs that appear to be made out of metal. As a result, a fan theory stating that Fox McCloud, along with other Star Fox members, had their legs amputated and replaced with metal prostheses became prevalent. Cuthbert stated that the characters' legs were not amputated and that they were just wearing boots, and Miyamoto stated that the appearance of metal legs was a design choice rather than an indication that the legs were amputated; he wanted the characters to appear more human, and was unaware of any issues faced by fighter pilots at the time.

=== Later appearances ===
In Star Fox Adventures and Star Fox: Assault, Fox was given a more realistic appearance, with more detailed fur. This was changed to a more cartoonish appearance in 2006's Star Fox Command, as, according to Imamura, realistic fur was unpopular with players. Due to concepts of Adventures being merged with the scrapped game Dinosaur Planet, the game was designed around Fox fighting outside of his ship, with Imamura greatly wanting him to use a gun as his method of combat. Eventually, the team landed on using a staff taken from Krystal as Fox's main weapon, as what existed from Dinosaur Planet's gameplay system meant that this gameplay system would control better. The later inclusion of a visor in Fox's design in Star Fox Zero was done to give players the idea that the dialogue heard during in-game flight sections was coming out of a headset on Fox's head. Fox was redesigned for the 2026 game Star Fox, which gave him a design that more closely resembles real-world foxes. Imamura was not involved in the design of Fox in the 2026 game due to his retirement in 2021; Imamura had mixed responses to the design, and personally felt that the design from The Super Mario Galaxy Movie was better, though he believed the new design to be "good in its own right".

Fox was considered to be a playable character in the 2015 game Skylanders: SuperChargers, though he was ultimately scrapped and replaced by Bowser in the final version. His inclusion in Starlink: Battle for Atlas came about due to Nintendo being deeply impressed by the game, with the company wanting to incorporate Star Fox characters into it as a result. For his appearance in The Super Mario Galaxy Movie, Fox was part of animation company Illumination's original pitch for the film, with Miyamoto excited at the idea of including the character. Though Miyamoto expected pushback on the idea, Fox's inclusion was met with a positive response by many higher-ups at Nintendo, leading to his appearance.

=== Voice actors ===
Fox has been voiced by a variety of actors. In the video games in English, he has been voiced by Daniel Owsen, Mike West, Joe Zieja, Steve Malpass, and Jim Walker. Glen Powell voices the character in the English release of The Super Mario Galaxy Movie. Powell pitched the idea of him voicing Fox in a potential Star Fox film soon after the release of The Super Mario Bros. Movie, around the same discussions occurred regarding Fox's appearance in the film, leading to Powell's casting. In Japanese, Fox has been voiced by Shinobu Satouchi, Kenji Nojima, and Takashi Ōhara.

== Reception and legacy ==
Since the release of the original Star Fox, Fox McCloud has gained a cult following. Several publications have listed Fox as one of the most popular characters in video games, and Fox, alongside his series, have been considered icons of popular culture and gaming as a whole. Despite his popularity, his inclusion in Star Fox Adventures, originally a non-Star Fox game, has been cited as damaging the wider brand, particularly due to his usual presence in flight-based games. However, Complex's Gus Turner stated that the game helped with giving players the opportunity to more directly engage with Fox's character.

Fox has had a major impact in the Super Smash Bros. series, where he has been considered one of its best characters, with Super Smash Bros. Melee in particular. As the game lacks few characters viable at an upper level of professional play, Fox is considered among its best. Fox is a dominant force within the game's competitive scene, and has grown unpopular within it due to his omnipresence in matches. Due to Fox's dominance in Super Smash Bros. Melee, an internet meme has arose dubbed "No items, Fox only, Final Destination". This meme exaggerated the tendencies of competitive players to adjust settings for maximum competitive fairness, as Final Destination was a popular stage choice, while playing without items was a popular ruleset. It is often used to criticize or tease hardcore competitive players of the series. This meme has been referenced in other games, including Among Us, and was used in terminology within the Mario Kart franchise. Nintendojo writer Mel Turnquist has stated the meme to be "timeless" due to the fact that these kinds of players would always be present in any fighting game's competitive scene.

Fox's appearance in The Super Mario Galaxy Movie received mixed responses from critics. Deadline Hollywood's Glenn Garner praised Fox and Powell's voice performance as being some of the highlights of the film. However, many fans were confused by Fox's significant role in the film's plot. Though Gizmodo's Germain Lussier found Fox to be a fun inclusion, he questioned the need for his inclusion in the film. Ollie Reynolds from Nintendo Life similarly found Fox's inclusion to be "jarring", though praised the voice performance of Powell. Brian Shea from Game Informer wrote that Fox's role was largely unneeded for the film, additionally feeling that the film's marketing revealing his presence in advance lessened the surprise of his appearance. However, he also praised Powell's performance, as well as his characterization. Kotaku's Kenneth Shepard praised Fox as being a "cool" character in the film, highlighting Powell's performance, and stating that Fox's incorporation in the film would help to revitalize him and other Star Fox characters' popularity with a new audience.
