= Starlink: Battle for Atlas =

2018 video game

- Developer: Ubisoft Toronto (Note: Additional work by Ubisoft Leamington. Ported to Switch by Virtuos.)
- Publisher: Ubisoft
- Directors: Laurent Malville; Richard Carillo
- Producer: Matthew Rose
- Designer: Jesse Knapp
- Programmer: Peter Handrinos
- Artist: Daniel Ebanks
- Writers: Joshua Mohan; Kyle Muir
- Composer: Trevor Yuile
- Engine: Snowdrop
- Platforms: Nintendo Switch; PlayStation 4; Xbox One; Microsoft Windows
- Release: PS4, Switch & Xbox One; October 16, 2018; Windows; April 30, 2019
- Genre: Action-adventure
- Modes: Single-player, multiplayer

Starlink: Battle for Atlas is an action-adventure video game developed by Ubisoft Toronto and published by Ubisoft. It was released for the Nintendo Switch, PlayStation 4, and Xbox One on October 16, 2018, and for Microsoft Windows on April 30, 2019. The game also features optional toys-to-life elements. While not meeting sales expectations, it received generally positive reviews from critics.

== Premise ==
The game is set in the Atlas star system. Early on in the game, the player's mothership, Equinox, is ambushed by the Forgotten Legion and crashes on a nearby planet; the captain of the Equinox is taken hostage. The Legion's leader, Grax, is obsessed with an extinct race called the Wardens, who left much of their ancient technology behind. Grax, who wants to use such technology for his own legion, acts as a constant threat that the player must face throughout their journey.

Exclusive to the Nintendo Switch version is a crossover with Nintendo's Star Fox series, where Fox McCloud, Falco Lombardi, Peppy Hare, and Slippy Toad provide aid to the main Starlink characters while on their own mission to hunt down Wolf O'Donnell. This was the first Nintendo Switch game to feature Star Fox characters, followed by Super Smash Bros. Ultimate several weeks later.

== Gameplay ==
Starlink: Battle for Atlas is an action-adventure game third-person perspective set in a fictional star system around the star Atlas. Players pilot spaceships to traverse different parts of the Atlas system, both in outer space and within a planet's atmosphere. Within the story players meet with different alien species and form alliances with them in order to accomplish various goals. Forming alliances changes the game's world state, which then changes the gameplay experience. In the game, players can freely use their spaceships to explore the open Atlas system. Split-screen multiplayer mode is also featured in the game, allowing two players to explore space and planets together. All ships can take off into space and skim on a planet's surface, with the transition between space and planet surface being described as "seamless".

Each planet has its own landscape, story, hazards, flora and fauna that may become a threat to the player. The player can also engage in both space- and planetary-based combat with enemies using spaceships. These spaceships can be extensively customized with different parts. Wings, weapons, and spacecraft modules can be freely swapped at will. The player is encouraged to experiment with different combinations of weapons as different enemies react differently to attacks. Pilots are also present and have special abilities that can be utilized in combat. For instance, one type of pilot can slow down time. There are 4 types of ships and pilots.

While the game can be played digitally, it also features toys-to-life elements in which the player can buy toys, which are ship components, for the game. The player can place their toys on a custom controller mount, and their digital counterpart will appear on-screen. When the player swaps the components of their real-life toy ships, its counterpart will also reflect such changes instantly. Each ship has two points which allows the player to connect spacecraft parts with the ships. Purchasing a physical part also unlocks its digital counterpart, meaning that the player does not necessarily have to use the toys and the controller mount to play the game.

=== Toys to Life ===
The PlayStation 4 and Xbox One editions of Starlink share exactly the same physical starter kit. Along with the controller mount, game and poster, the kit includes main character pilot Mason Rana, the Zenith starship and three weapons: Shredder, Flamethrower, and Frost Barrage. The Nintendo Switch Starter Pack includes Fox McCloud and his Arwing starship instead of the Zenith starship and Shredder weapon. The only way to buy the Zenith starship and Shredder weapon physical counterparts is via a PlayStation 4 or Xbox One Starter Pack. Ubisoft released six Starship Packs, four Weapon Packs, and four Pilot Packs outside of the Starter Packs. As the game's sales failed to meet Ubisoft's expectations, the company halted the release of new toys starting from the release of the Spring update.

== Development ==
The game was developed by Ubisoft Toronto for Nintendo Switch, PlayStation 4, and Xbox One. Ubisoft Leamington assisted on development. Development for the game began after the CEO of Ubisoft Yves Guillemot assigned the team to create a new game which mixes "breakthrough technology and innovative gameplay". Shortly after, a small team of 10 developers began brainstorming different ideas and pitching it to the developers. The team eventually came up with the idea of creating a new toys-to-life game, and this idea was approved by Guillemot. The team then soon began prototyping the technology of a Starlink spaceship, which included exposed wires and duct tape. Nonetheless, it received an enthusiastic reaction from the team and they soon began working on creating the Atlas system, which set the game's foundation as an open world game.

While the game was originally intended for kids aged between 8 and 11, the team later changed the target audience to include a wider age group after seeing the positive reaction from parents who have watched their children playing the game. The game features a two-player cooperative multiplayer mode as the team thought that it will be interesting to see players exchanging parts for their ships during play. According to the game's producer, Matthew Rose, the team "never want to tell kids they're being creative wrong". Therefore, the team allowed players to combine all parts freely, including having the wings of the spacecraft placed upside down and the weapons facing backward.

The toys-to-life technology featured in Starlink was developed in-house by Ubisoft Toronto. To ensure that the game is consumer-friendly, this aspect of the game was made optional, meaning that players can play the game digitally without purchasing any of the toys. Critics commented on the timing in which Ubisoft announced the title. It was during the time where popular toys-to-life titles including Skylanders and Disney Infinity were winding down. According to Laurent Malville, the game's creative director, the team believed that the game had enough innovation to revive the failing genre.

Starlink: Battle for Atlas was announced by publisher Ubisoft during its press conference at E3 2017. At E3 2018 it was announced that the Nintendo Switch version of the game would feature a playable Fox McCloud and his Arwing ship from the Star Fox series, as well as supporting characters from the series in non-playable roles. Star Fox creator Shigeru Miyamoto was a guest at the Ubisoft E3 conference for the announcement, which was the second straight year he had appeared at the Ubisoft conference following Mario + Rabbids Kingdom Battle in 2017.

The game was released on October 16, 2018. Several critics believed that Starlink was the game teased by Ubisoft in one of Watch Dogs 2's side-missions, though it was never confirmed by Ubisoft.

To promote the game, Cartoon Network UK's YouTube channel released a three-part special feature starring gaming journalist Charleyy Hodson.

== Reception ==
Reception

Aggregate score
Aggregator	Score
Metacritic	XONE: 78/100; NS: 74/100; PS4: 70/100

Review scores
Publication	Score
Destructoid	7/10
Edge	6/10
Electronic Gaming Monthly	4/5
Game Informer	8/10
GameSpot	7/10
GamesRadar+	4/5
IGN	7/10
Jeuxvideo.com	14/20
Nintendo Life	9/10
Nintendo World Report	8/10
PlayStation Official Magazine – UK	5/10
Official Xbox Magazine (UK)	8/10

According to review aggregator website Metacritic, Starlink: Battle for Atlas received "generally favorable reviews" on the Xbox One and "mixed or average reviews" on the Nintendo Switch and PlayStation 4 versions.

Craig Harris of IGN praised the game for its combat, exploration and the inclusion of Star Fox, though he criticized the repetitive nature of the gameplay.

=== Accolades ===
Year	Award	Category	Result	Ref.
2018	Game Critics Awards	Best Hardware/Peripheral	Nominated	
2018	Gamescom Awards	Best Console Game (Nintendo Switch)	Nominated	
2018	The Game Awards	Best Family Game	Nominated	
2018	Gamers' Choice Awards	Fan Favorite Family-Friendly Multiplayer Game	Nominated	
2018	Titanium Awards	Best Social/Family Game	Nominated	
2019	New York Game Awards	Central Park Children's Zoo Award for Best Kids Game	Nominated	
2019	D.I.C.E. Awards	Family Game of the Year	Nominated	
2019	National Academy of Video Game Trade Reviewers Awards	Game, Original Family	Nominated	
2019	Italian Video Game Awards	Best Family Game	Nominated	
