= Star Fox: Assault =

2005 video game

- North American box art
- Developer: Namco
- Publisher: Nintendo
- Directors: Toshiyuki Nakanishi; Hideki Okazaki; Yutaka Yoshida
- Producers: Tsuyoshi Kobayashi; Shigeru Miyamoto; Takaya Imamura
- Artist: Yoshihiko Arawi
- Writers: Yoshihiko Arawi; Ayumu Shindo; Kazuya Hatazawa
- Composers: Yoshie Arakawa; Yoshinori Kawamoto
- Series: Star Fox
- Platform: GameCube
- Release: NA: 15 February 2005; JP: 24 February 2005; EU: 29 April 2005; AU: 16 June 2005
- Genres: Rail shooter, third-person shooter
- Modes: Single-player, multiplayer

Star Fox: Assault (Note: Japanese: スターフォックス アサルト, Hepburn: Sutā Fokkusu Asaruto) is a 2005 third-person shooter game developed by Namco and published by Nintendo for the GameCube. It is the fourth released title in the Star Fox series. The game was released on 15 February 2005 in North America, on 24 February 2005 in Japan, on 29 April 2005 in Europe, and on 16 June 2005 in Australia.

The game is set a year after the events of Star Fox Adventures, and follows Fox McCloud and his crew attempting to save the Lylat System from cybernetic insectoid race known as the Aparoid. It contains orchestral arrangements of music from Star Fox 64 as well as original tracks created specifically for the game.

When Assault was initially announced by Nintendo and Namco, it was also rumored that an arcade game was under development, but it was never officially revealed to the public.

Star Fox: Assault received mixed reviews from critics, who praised its atmosphere, soundtrack and the ability to use both the Arwing and Landmaster at will during ground missions, but criticized its on-foot controls, short length and low lasting impact of the multiplayer mode.

== Gameplay ==
Fox helps destroy the Aparoids that have appeared on Sauria with his Arwing in a similar manner to previous titles.

The gameplay of Star Fox: Assault is divided into three distinctive types. The player can either fly an Arwing spacecraft, drive a Landmaster tank or perform certain tasks on foot. All three play types are available for use in the game's multiplayer mode, though the available gameplay types are restricted based on the chosen map.

Arwing missions are similar to those of the first two games in the series. The player flies in space or close to the ground and shoots down enemies. Some levels are on rails, while others allow full freedom of movement in a relatively small area. As in previous games, main character Fox's wing mates Falco, Slippy and Krystal occasionally call for help when chased by enemies, requiring the player to save them. If their shield gauge is depleted, they will retreat. Against bosses, Slippy can show their health bar by analyzing them, while Krystal can spot their weak points. In Arwing-only missions, if Fox has rescued his teammates, they will return the favour later on. Slippy and Krystal will grant him silver rings to replenish his shield gauge, while Falco will pass him Smart Bombs. Completing a mission without any teammate retreating will grant an ally medal. Additionally, in some levels, the player has the ability to hop in and out of the Arwing at will.

While in the Landmaster, the player has complete freedom to move about the level. They are free to shoot or run over enemies and assist their wing mates when necessary. Playing on foot essentially turns the game into a 3D third-person run 'n' gun shooter; the player starts armed with a standard blaster gun and can acquire a variety of other weapons scattered throughout each stage. In two shooting gallery levels, the player rides on the wing of an Arwing or a Wolfen fighter, shooting enemies on the ground and in the air with a plasma cannon.

The game features a number of weapons, such as the blaster, machine gun, Homing Launcher, sniper rifle and the hand grenade. The game has a number of special items, including personal barriers which deflect enemy attacks. The usual rings seen in other Star Fox games that restore a vehicle's shield are also present.

Whenever damage is taken from enemies or hazards, the shield or health meter depletes; depleting the meter completely will cause the vehicle to be destroyed or the player to lose a life, with a blue meter appearing when using vehicles during on-foot missions. Lives are also lost from four mission failures. If the player runs out of lives, they will receive a game over and be sent back to the title screen. If Fox dies, the mission will go back at the start of the section he died in. During ground missions, a vehicle's destruction won't cause him to lose a life unless his health meter is also depleted, and Peppy will send him another one right after. However, if the Arwing gets destroyed in space, Fox will die instantly. During ground battles, he can replenish his health by collecting first aid kits, while rings will repair the vehicle he's using.

Players can receive a bronze, silver, or gold medal for each stage based on their score upon completion. Collecting all silver medals throughout the game will unlock the NES port of the scrolling shooter arcade game Xevious as a bonus minigame. In the Japanese version, collecting all bronze and gold medals will also unlock the Famicom games Battle City and Star Luster respectively.

=== Multiplayer ===
The game supports multiplayer for up to four players simultaneously. This mode starts off very limited, with only a few playable characters, weapons, items, and maps; but many more can be unlocked by either playing a certain number of multiplayer games or achieving certain accomplishments in-game. Players are able to fight on foot or in a vehicle (a Landmaster, Arwing, or Wolfen), though some stages prohibit certain modes of travel. Playable characters include all four members of the Star Fox team, along with unlockable characters Peppy and Wolf.

Multiplayer mode offers several stages for gameplay, including stages from the single-player mode, "Simple Maps" made from blocks in basic geometric shapes, and other new maps. There are also several modes for play available, which can force a certain weapon (sniper, rocket launcher, etc.) or change the style of play (capture the crown, etc.). Players can choose to enable or disable certain options, such as radar, special weapons, and Demon Launchers.

Players can wield all of the items and weapons featured in the single-player mode, along with special unlockable items and weapons. These include jet packs, which allow the characters to hover; the stealth suit, which temporarily makes characters invisible; and the Demon Sniper and Demon Launcher, which can eliminate an opponent or vehicle with one shot.

== Story ==
=== Setting and characters ===
The game stars the members of Star Fox, a team of spacefaring mercenaries: Fox McCloud (Jim Walker/Kenji Nojima), Falco Lombardi (Mike Madeoy/Hisao Egawa), Slippy Toad (Mike McAuliffe/Kyōko Tongū) and their newest member Krystal (Alésia Glidewell/Aya Hara) participate in combat missions, while Peppy Hare (Henry Dardenne/Tomohisa Asō) and ROB 64 (Dex Manley/Yūsuke Numata) provide tactical support from their mothership, the Great Fox. Star Fox frequently clash with rival mercenary group Star Wolf, made up of Wolf O'Donnell (Grant Goodeve/Mahito Ohba), Leon Powalski (David Scully/Shinobu Satouchi) and new recruit Panther Caroso (Scully/Tetsu Inada); former members Pigma Dengar (Lev Liberman/Daisuke Gōri) and Andrew Oikonny (John Hugill/Numata) have since been kicked out of the team. Other supporting characters include Cornerian commanding officer General Pepper (Gray Eubank/Michihiro Ikemizu) and Slippy's scientist father, Beltino Toad (Scott Burns/Hirohiko Kakegawa).

The Star Fox team's primary opponents are the Aparoids, a race of cybernetic insectoid creatures. They are capable of controlling machines and life forms through an infection process known as "Aparoidedation". The Aparoids operate as a hive mind under the control of the Aparoid Queen (Glidewell/Hara), who believes that all things exist for the infestation and seeks to assimilate everything in the universe under her control.

Assault takes place one year after the events of Star Fox Adventures. The game is once again set in the Lylat System and sees the Star Fox team travelling to many different locations, such as their native planet Corneria, Star Wolf's base the Sargasso Hideout, the prehistoric planet Sauria, and the Aparoid Homeworld. Other planets are featured exclusively in the game's multiplayer mode.

=== Synopsis ===
One year after the death of his uncle Andross, Andrew Oikonny assumes leadership of the planet Venom's remaining troops and begins a rebellion. General Pepper orders an attack on Oikonny's forces, hiring the Star Fox team to assist the Cornerian Army. During the battle, Oikonny's flagship is destroyed by a robotic insectoid creature that attacks Star Fox. After Fox destroys the creature, he recovers a damaged Core Memory unit and turns it over to Slippy's father, Beltino, for research. Beltino explains the creature is a member of a race of cybernetic insectoids called Aparoids, one of which ravaged the Cornerian fleet seventeen years prior. Fearing an invasion, Beltino asks Star Fox to recover an undamaged Core Memory so that they might find a way to stop the Aparoids.

Lured by a distress signal, Star Fox is deceived by Pigma, who tricks them into destroying a giant Aparoid so he can steal its Core Memory and sell it on the black market. Wishing to find Pigma, Star Fox attacks the base of his former cohorts, the Star Wolf team, and get them to reveal his hideout's location. However, by the time Star Fox arrives at Pigma's hideaway, he has already been infected by the Aparoids and they are forced to kill him. The stolen Core Memory is then sent to Beltino for analysis. While Star Fox prevents an Aparoid assault on Sauria, Corneria is left nearly defenseless, with the Aparoids breaching the planet and infecting General Pepper. Star Fox returns to contain the threat, aided by the unexpected arrival of Star Wolf, who seek to eliminate their common enemy.

Beltino uses the Core Memory to locate the Aparoid Homeworld, and discovers their vulnerability to apoptosis. He creates a self-destruct program which, if fired into the Aparoid Queen, will force all the Aparoids to self-destruct. Star Fox, Star Wolf, and the Cornerian navy travel to the Aparoid Homeworld, only to discover the Homeworld Core is blocked by a regenerative shield. With the Great Fox becoming infected by the Aparoids, Peppy and ROB crash it into the shield, creating an opening for the two teams to enter the Homeworld Core.

While Star Wolf stays behind to take care of the remaining Aparoid forces, Star Fox reaches the Aparoid Queen. The queen attempts to use the voices of Peppy, Pepper, Pigma, and Fox's dead father, James McCloud, to deceive them into joining her, but the team is undeterred. After a long battle, Fox launches the self-destruct program into the queen, but she resists it and attempts to escape to create an antibody. Fox deals the final blow to the queen, killing her and causing the self-destruction of the Aparoids and their homeworld. Successfully evacuating, the team reunites with Peppy and ROB, who survived the crash by using an escape pod and reveal the other infectees, including Pepper, have been cured. Confident that Star Wolf has also survived, Fox thanks everyone as they head for home.

== Development ==
An early poster for the game that would become Star Fox: Assault from 2002, illustrated by Takaya Imamura

Star Fox: Assault was first informally announced on May 8, 2002, several months before the release of its predecessor, Star Fox Adventures. The initial press release gave the game a tentative release date of April 2003, while also claiming that it was being developed by the same employees who worked on Ace Combat 2 at Namco; neither of these came to pass, with the game receiving multiple delays until 2005 and also being produced and directed by other Namco staff members outside of the Ace Combat development team, particularly those that worked on the Klonoa series, such as Tsuyoshi Kobayashi and Toshiyuki Nakanishi.

Star Fox: Assault was meant to be a return to the series' roots, after Star Fox Adventures being a notable departure from the series' usual 3D rail shooter gameplay in favor of an action adventure styled title. According to Star Fox series creator Takaya Imamura, Shigeru Miyamoto had requested prior to development that he wanted to see "a Star Fox game that was cooler and slicker than ever before". The game's development, unusually, began with its multiplayer battle mode, as Imamura desired to improve upon the battle mode that was present in Star Fox 64, which was described as being a last-minute bonus. Namco handed Nintendo a handful of planning documents titled "Vehicle-Swapping War Action game", and it was decided that this concept, of being able to change freely between vehicles such as the Arwings and Landmasters, would be the starting point for Assault's development. Reportedly, the development team had put much of their effort and resources into the battle mode, and even questioned creating a single-player mode at all, explaining why the game's initial reveal trailer in E3 2003 exclusively focused on the multiplayer; According to Electronic Gaming Monthly, this particular video was booed by viewers, and EGM itself said the video was "remarkably unimpressive". In the end, the developers felt that fans would want a proper story mode similar to the ones present in previous Star Fox games, so it was then decided to press on and create one; this is reportedly a factor into why the game received multiple delays. It was also decided to forgo the series' tradition of including branching pathways, instead deciding to put effort into including more volume and strategic possibility into a single stage each that would also now include checkpoints, thus, from the perspective of the developers, negating the need for branching paths as seen in Star Fox 64. At E3 2004, EGM, the same magazine that wrote poorly about it a year before, wrote a follow-up that said the game looked "much better than...a year ago". Assault was then scheduled for a November 2004 release, but was delayed to the beginning of 2005.

Assault notably includes three different controller setups, as Namco faced many issues developing one reliable control scheme, primarily regarding the ground controls. Initially, they attempted to implement dual-stick controls, similar to many shooter games at the time. However, playtesting showed that the dual-stick scheme was difficult for novice players to adjust to, so a control scheme using just one joystick was also developed. Namco also chose to implement an "acceleration-style" control scheme, intended to emulate the controls of Star Fox 64, so returning fans would feel more comfortable with the game.

The game's narrative was handled by Namco, with the concept of the Aparoids, the main enemy forces of Star Fox: Assault, in particular being conceived by Kobayashi, as something of a tribute to the Galaxian series, a sci-fi Shoot 'em up video game franchise that involves combating alien insectoids, which was also created by Namco. However, Nintendo staff, particularly Imamura, would also provide requests and inputs on how the Star Fox characters and world would be portrayed. For example, the inclusion of new female pilot Krystal, first introduced in Star Fox Adventures, was requested by Nintendo; according to Imamura, this was partially because he wanted players to see the characters grow and evolve over the course of the series, and thus there was a desire to acknowledge Adventures, despite it being considered to be something of a side story within the Star Fox series. The development team were reportedly split on how Krystal would be portrayed, with one side wanting her to be occupy a motherly role, and those who wanted her to be more of a big sister type. It was also Imamura's call to feature Beltino Toad, Slippy's father, as director of research for the Cornerian Army, who previously fought against the Aparoids 17 years prior to the events of Assault, as Imamura wanted there to be something that was already there in the past so there would be a connection, giving the story greater depth. Beltino had previously only been mentioned in Star Fox 64's print material, specifically the game's players guide, Assault marks his first official appearance in the series.

The game's subtitle, Assault, was suggested by Nintendo of America. However, there were initially legal concerns as Namco had already trademarked that name for their 1988 arcade game of the same name; fortunately, this trademark was said to be only valid within Japan, and Namco, who were already developers for Star Fox: Assault, had granted them permission to use the title.

The game uses middleware provided by the Japanese company CRI Middleware as a game engine. Yoshie Arakawa and Yoshinori Kanemoto provided Assault with a musical score and sound effects with the music performed by the Tokyo New City Orchestra. Most of the score pieces use themes from Star Fox 64, composed by Koji Kondo and Hajime Wakai.

== Reception ==
Reception

Aggregate scores
Aggregator	Score
GameRankings	71%
Metacritic	67/100

Review scores
Publication	Score
Electronic Gaming Monthly	7.33/10
Famitsu	31/40
GameSpot	7.3/10
IGN	7.0/10
Play	8/10
Cube	6.9/10

Star Fox: Assault received "mixed or average" reviews, according to video game review aggregator platform Metacritic. GameRankings gave the game an average score of 71%. Some complaints were aimed at the control scheme during on-foot portions; IGN worded the complaint as "ground missions suffering from sloppy control". GameSpot noted that the multiplayer portion of the game has little lasting value, an annoyance that IGN felt as well. IGN went on to say the design was too simplistic. However, IGN noted that being able to switch between the Arwing and Landmaster at will was a "welcome addition". In Electronic Gaming Monthly, two of the reviewers gave it an 8 out of 10. Play magazine gave the game 8 out of 10. Thunderbolt gave it 9 out of 10. Kevin Gifford said that "the game is aimed less at the Mario club and more toward the hardcore crowd". EGM also noted that Assault had an epic feel, helped by a great soundtrack.

The game became enough of a commercial success for it to be included in Nintendo's Player's Choice line, which also includes Star Fox 64 and Star Fox Adventures.
