= Star Fox Adventures =

2002 video game

- North American cover art
- Developer: Rare
- Publisher: Nintendo
- Director: Lee Schuneman
- Producers: Chris Stamper; Shigeru Miyamoto
- Designers: Steven Brand; Shaun Read
- Programmer: Phil Tossell
- Artists: Kevin Bayliss; Johnni Christensen; Keith Rabbette
- Composers: David Wise; Ben Cullum
- Series: Star Fox
- Platform: GameCube
- Release: NA: 23 September 2002; JP: 27 September 2002; AU: 15 November 2002; EU: 22 November 2002
- Genres: Action-adventure, beat 'em up, shooter
- Mode: Single-player

Star Fox Adventures is a 2002 action-adventure game developed by Rare and published by Nintendo for the GameCube. The story is set eight years after the events of Star Fox 64, with players taking control of Fox McCloud, who is sent on a mission to visit the Dinosaur Planet in the Lylat System and prevent its destruction. Gameplay is divided between Adventure Mode, in which players explore environments while defeating enemies, solving puzzles, and collecting items, and Arwing Mode, which features rail shooter segments.

The game originated from two separate projects originally in production for the Nintendo 64: a proposed action-adventure sequel to Star Fox 64 that was in development at Nintendo EAD in Kyoto, and Dinosaur Planet, an original property created by Rare that began development in 1997. Nintendo producer Shigeru Miyamoto convinced Rare to merge the two projects, with Star Fox characters and gameplay elements being implemented into the world of Dinosaur Planet. Development was moved forward one hardware generation to the GameCube, ending work on the Nintendo 64. A build of the cancelled Dinosaur Planet version surfaced online in 2021.

Star Fox Adventures was released on September 23, 2002. It was Rare's only GameCube game, as they were acquired by Microsoft the day after its release in the United States. It was a commercial success and received mostly positive reviews, notably for its detailed graphics, new designs of characters including Fox, and its dynamic environments. However, the voice acting and the departure from the traditional Star Fox-style gameplay received some criticism. Star Fox Adventures was rereleased on the Nintendo Switch 2 through the Nintendo Classics service on September 9, 2026.

== Gameplay ==
Fox McCloud in combat with enemies. The interface displays the player's health, controls, and timer.

Star Fox Adventures is played from a third-person perspective with full camera control in most areas and the ability to use a first-person perspective for looking around a location. The game supports a widescreen aspect ratio if the console is connected to a compatible television set. The player switches between two styles of gameplay.

The first style of gameplay is Adventure Mode, which is the main mode, and operates in a similar manner to that of The Legend of Zelda series, especially Ocarina of Time. In this mode, players control the protagonist as they explore thirteen locations on foot, each of which unlocks when the player completes a specific task or acquires a new requisite skill, in order to progress the story. Some of the gameplay mechanics are similar to those in the Zelda games: Adventures has a form of currency called Scarabs, that can be used to purchase healing items, new equipment, and maps of the various locations; the main character's health is divided into hearts consisting of four segments and vaguely resembling fox heads, with the player beginning with three hearts and earning a new one after completing key stages of the story; the character can climb ladders and ledges, swim, and jump between platforms, but cannot freely jump themselves; some areas require the player to solve a puzzle to acquire something or move on; and the game features a day-and-night phase, though this is more gradual than in Zelda games.

The main character comes equipped with a staff after the initial stages, which functions as both a weapon, and a tool for exploration and puzzle-solving. Combat is mainly melee-orientated, with players locking-on to an enemy upon moving in close. Once in combat, an enemy's health is displayed as a heart icon above them, with players able to strafe and roll around a target to dodge attacks, while using the staff to either block incoming strikes, or attack an enemy. As a tool, the staff can be used to open containers, operate mechanisms, or lift up stones to uncover hidden caves and boulders to find items. As the player progress in the story, the staff can be upgraded with powers that can help in combat or assist in solving puzzles and exploring locations, including the ability to fire projectiles at enemies or trigger switches, and a special jump ability to reach places that are inaccessible through normal methods. However, using such powers requires magical energy, which the player can recover by retrieving special crystals from the environment. Along with the staff, the player also has a sidekick that joins them after a certain stage of the story, who can help by finding them items and using certain abilities to open up new areas. Such abilities, referred to as tricks, require the player to feed them with special mushrooms, with each one constituting one trick that can be performed, with the sidekick able to perform a maximum of six tricks when fully fed before needing more mushrooms. The game's inventory system focuses on three areas - collectibles, staff powers, and Tricky abilities - with the player able to use three scanner systems - a mini-map of a region (provided a map has been purchased first), a scanner to give information on objects in that are approached, and a fuel cell radar.

The second style of gameplay is Arwing Mode, and functions in a similar manner to other games in the Star Fox series. In this mode, the player decides where on Dinosaur Planet to go; at the beginning, the planet itself, the overworld, is only accessible, but upon unlocking a planet segment during the Adventure Mode, the player gains access to travelling there via Arwing. Upon choosing a destination, the player engages in an on-rail segment, in which players dodge obstacles while shooting down enemies, with the ability to fly through silver rings to recover some health, and being able to use super-bombs to eliminate groups of enemies. In order to visit a place, the player must fly through a set number of gold rings; each segment has around 10 gold rings, and the player will need to fly through more to reach later areas, or be forced to repeat the segment. In addition, the player must also acquire a certain amount of fuel cells during Adventure Mode, before they can use the Arwing to travel somewhere. Once a location has been reached for the first time, Fuel Cells will no longer be consumed when traveling to that area.

== Story ==
=== Characters and setting ===
As in previous series entries, players primarily control Fox McCloud, leader of Star Fox, who is sent on a new mission at the request of General Pepper of the Cornerian army. Fox is supported by the other members of Star Fox, consisting of Slippy Toad, Peppy Hare, and ROB 64; former member Falco Lombardi is stated to have left the team. In addition to Fox, the prologue allows players to control Krystal, a mysterious blue fox seeking answers for her parents' deaths.

The entire game takes place on the world of Dinosaur Planet (Note: Identified as "Sauria" in subsequent games) and a number of detached pieces of the planet that are suspended in orbit around it. The entire planet is populated with dinosaurs and other prehistoric animals such as pterosaurs and mammoths. Dinosaur Planet is ruled by the EarthWalker tribe, resembling ceratopsians, and the rival CloudRunner tribe, similar to pterosaurs and birds. They are opposed by the SharpClaw, a tribe of villainous humanoid theropods led by the tyrannical General Scales, who seeks to control the planet. To help defeat Scales, the Earthwalker prince Tricky accompanies Fox during his journey.

=== Synopsis ===
Eight years after the defeat of Andross, (Note: As depicted in Star Fox 64 (1997)) Krystal investigates the destruction of her home planet, Cerinia, and the death of her parents. Receiving a distress call from the Krazoa Palace, Krystal discovers that it was attacked by General Scales and the SharpClaw army. Krystal is persuaded by a wounded EarthWalker in the Palace to collect the Krazoa Spirits and return them to the palace, which would supposedly tilt the war in the dinosaurs' favour and stop Scales. After releasing the first one, however, a mysterious being sends Krystal into the spirit's path, trapping her in a floating crystal atop the palace until all the spirits can be returned.

Meanwhile, on the edge of the Lylat System, General Pepper contacts the Star Fox team, asking them to investigate the invasion of the Dinosaur Planet. Since the team are desperate for money and maintenance, the team leader Fox agrees to take a look, arriving unarmed at Pepper's request to avoid trouble with the locals. On the planet's surface, Fox obtains and wields the magic staff which Krystal lost earlier. Fox learns from the Queen of the EarthWalker Tribe that Scales stole four Spellstones from the planet's two Force Point Temples. Resolving to prevent the planet from breaking up further and restore it to its original unity, Fox traverses the planet and retrieves the stones to the temples, with the help of the Queen's son, Prince Tricky. As Fox retrieves the stones, he discovers that he must also retrieve the other five Krazoa Spirits to repair the planet and save Krystal. When Fox finds the last spirit, he discovers that it is guarded by Scales himself. However, just as Fox and Scales engage in combat, a mysterious voice orders Scales to surrender the spirit, to which he reluctantly agrees. Fox takes the spirit to the Krazoa Shrine and frees Krystal.

The spirits are forced into the head of a Krazoa statue, which reveals itself to be the resurrected Andross, the mastermind behind the spirit scheme, who flies off to resume his assault on the Lylat System. Falco appears and helps Fox to destroy Andross once again, releasing the Krazoa spirits and allowing them to restore the planet to normal. Afterwards, Falco rejoins the Star Fox team and Krystal is recruited, beginning a romance with Fox.

== Development ==
Dinosaur Planet artwork showing various characters, including Krystal's original design

Star Fox Adventures had its origins in two separate projects, one of these being Dinosaur Planet, a Nintendo 64 game unrelated to the Star Fox series. According to lead engineer Phil Tossell, development of Dinosaur Planet began after the release of Diddy Kong Racing (1997), with two teams to work on Dinosaur Planet and Jet Force Gemini toward the end of the Nintendo 64's lifespan. The genre changed many times during early development before Rare settled on the idea of an open world adventure-game based around two interwoven stories. According to Kevin Bayliss, a lead developer at Rare, Dinosaur Planet was originally to feature Timber, the tiger character from Diddy Kong Racing, as that game was originally planned to be RC Pro-Am 64 and featuring Timber until Nintendo suggested them to work it into the Donkey Kong intellectual property. They set Timber as a time-traveler in a prehistoric world, with gameplay similar to The Legend of Zelda: Ocarina of Time (1998). As development continued, Rare found it better to feature two separate main characters, Sabre the wolf and Krystal the fox, forgoing Timber's appearance. The plot for Dinosaur Planet concerned Sabre and Krystal, along with sidekicks Tricky and Kyte (who both appear in the finished game), and Randorn, a wizard who was Sabre's father and Krystal's adoptive father (who was dropped entirely). The game featured elements such as the "SwapStone", which would let the player switch between Krystal and Sabre. Dinosaur Planet was intended to be Rare's last game for the Nintendo 64 and featured gameplay and cinematics inspired by Ocarina of Time. Dinosaur Planet initially utilised the Nintendo 64's Expansion Pak and was housed in a 512-megabit (64 megabyte) cartridge, the largest size supported by the console.

Star Fox Adventures originated here in Kyoto: personally, I've been working on the series for a long time and am quite attached to it, so I went to Miyamoto like, "let me do it! let me do it!" and he replied with, "for this game, why not try an adventure-style game instead of a shooting game?", and so Morita and I began toying around with various ideas.

— Takaya Imamura on the advent of Star Fox Adventures' initial development, before it was merged with Dinosaur Planet, in an interview with Nintendo Dream

Meanwhile, at Nintendo's headquarters in Kyoto, Star Fox creator Takaya Imamura, feeling attachment to the series, had requested Nintendo producer Shigeru Miyamoto to let him produce a sequel; Miyamoto obliged, but requested the game instead be an action adventure game, forgoing the series' usual 3D rail shooter gameplay. Imamura, as well as programmer Kazuaki Morita, began experimenting with various ideas for what was to be called Star Fox Adventures, such as having Fox run around on-foot and shooting down enemies with a gun. However, progress on the project stalled due to it being a late Nintendo 64 game and much of the staff being pulled away to work on bigger projects such as Mario and The Legend of Zelda games for the then-upcoming GameCube console.

Bayliss said that Rare developed Dinosaur Planet in earnest, including preparation of a large E3 2000 demonstration, without considering that Nintendo already had the Star Fox property. The Dinosaur Planet demo caught Miyamoto's attention, noticing the striking similarities between Rare's anthropomorphic design of Sabre and Nintendo's Fox McCloud. Just prior to E3 2000, Nintendo asked Rare to keep discussion of Dinosaur Planet quiet and arranged a meeting with Rare to see about a "marriage" of Dinosaur Planet and their Star Fox Adventures concept during the event. The two companies agreed to the idea of Star Fox Adventures: Dinosaur Planet as a Nintendo 64 game, maintaining as much of Rare's work as possible. Bayliss, Tossel, and Lee Schuneman later met with Nintendo in Japan in the weeks that followed to further discuss how to merge the properties, such as bringing Fox McCloud and the other Star Fox characters into the game, adjusting the art style of the other characters of Dinosaur Planet to match, and developing a story to fit into the Star Fox canon.

In February 2021, a late development version of Dinosaur Planet for the Nintendo 64 dated December 2000 was leaked online, having been acquired from a collector in Sweden. The build features a unique model for Fox instead of Sabre, indicating that Miyamoto's intervention happened before the decision was made to transition to GameCube. A recompiled version was announced to be in development in May 2025.

We were slightly disappointed at having to change Dinosaur Planet as we had all become so attached to it, but we could also see the potential of using the Star Fox licence.

— Phil Tossell in an interview with Nintendo Life

I think somewhere in his mind, Miyamoto's always pictured Star Fox as somewhat mature, and he's been saying things like "wouldn't it be good to add a slightly sexy character?" since the beginning. Likewise, for Star Fox 64, although the game certainly appeals to children somewhat, I think Miyamoto felt that leaning fully into that would be going too far, and he wanted to add some more mature touches where possible.

— Takaya Imamura on Krystal's redesign in an interview with Nintendo Dream

The team later realised the potential of using the Star Fox licence in hopes of boosting awareness, and switched development from the Nintendo 64 to the then-upcoming GameCube, targeting release as a launch game for the console. Sabre was dropped in favor of Fox McCloud as the lead, but Star Fox Adventures retains Dinosaur Planet characters such as Krystal and Tricky. Rare staff had originally considered removing Krystal in the transition from Dinosaur Planet, but Nintendo, specifically Takaya Imamura, who had been brought on as a supervisor and producer for the project, requested she remain, feeling it would be a waste to scrap her. Imamura assisted in illustrating her final design during his visits at Rare, which was much more sexualized and revealing than her original Dinosaur Planet appearance. According to Imamura, he and Miyamoto were looking to add "sex appeal" to the Star Fox franchise, as Miyamoto wanted the series to have mature elements where possible, and that Krystal's new design was inspired by Vampirella, a comic book character known for wearing risqué outfits. Despite this, no video game content rating systems reported any significant sexual content in the final product. The Dinosaur Planet subtitle was dropped. Of all games converted away from Nintendo 64 in its late market span, IGN called this possibly the biggest departure, having expected it to be one of the platform's killer apps, and side-by-side comparing its "amazing graphical upgrades" on GameCube.

With the Star Fox theme established, Rare began reworking the game for the GameCube with little interference from Nintendo. During development, the team was invited to Nintendo's headquarters in Kyoto to discuss progress and certain changes; in return Imamura came to stay at Rare's Twycross studio to oversee development. Tossell stated that "without a doubt", Nintendo strengthened their relationship through trust and respect, though Nintendo only had a 49% stake of the company at the time.

David Wise used Peter Siedleczek's Advanced Orchestra library in creating the music for Star Fox Adventures. Wise said the tracks that reference the music for the previous Star Fox games came very late in development, after having converted it into Star Fox Adventures.

Star Fox Adventures is the only Rare game released for the GameCube. Shortly after its release, Microsoft purchased Rare for £375 million, ending most of Rare's association with Nintendo. Rare continued developing games for the Game Boy Advance and Nintendo DS after the acquisition.

== Reception ==
Reception

Aggregate score
Aggregator	Score
Metacritic	82/100

Review scores
Publication	Score
AllGame	3.5/5
Edge	6/10
Electronic Gaming Monthly	7.17/10
Eurogamer	6/10
Famitsu	32/40
Game Informer	8.75/10
GameSpot	8.3/10
Hyper	82/100
IGN	9/10
NGC Magazine	7.2/10
Nintendo Life	7/10
Nintendo Power	4.4/5
Official Nintendo Magazine	9/10

Star Fox Adventures received "generally favorable" reviews, according to video game review aggregator platform Metacritic. It sold over 200,000 copies in Japan following its release, and was the fastest-selling GameCube game at the time. By July 2006, it had sold 800,000 copies and earned $30 million (~$44.8 million in 2024) in the United States. Next Generation ranked it as the 73rd highest-selling game launched for the PlayStation 2, Xbox or GameCube between January 2000 and July 2006 in that country. Combined sales of Star Fox games released during the 2000s reached 1.2 million units in the United States by July 2006. Star Fox Adventures was eventually designated a Player's Choice game by Nintendo, signifying over 250,000 copies sold, and was thus available at a reduced retail price.

The visuals were highly praised, particularly for Fox's character model redesign. Edge wrote that the "visual splendour is immense". Matt Casamassina of IGN found it a "perfect companion" to The Legend of Zelda series, to which Adventures is often compared. Casamassina noted that elements of its graphical rendering were sophisticated for its time, in particular the advanced real-time rendering of the movement of the characters' fur. Writing for Entertainment Weekly, Geoff Keighley praised the "beautifully rendered environments" and "rewarding exploration". NGC Magazine praised the vibrant atmosphere and detailed textures. The game's combat system garnered some accolades, with GameSpot adding that the combat is simplistic, though being "good looking" and not frustrating. Casamassina also praised the combat system. NGC Magazine similarly praised the use of the combat system, but they noted that the battles did not require any skill and eventually "felt like a dull chore". The voice acting was viewed negatively, with Casamassina remarking that it is "over the top" in some places. NGC Magazine said that the accents of most of the characters did not suit that of the Star Fox world, in particular they noted the use of a Scottish accent for the Warpstone Master was "awful".

Though mostly positively reviewed, Star Fox Adventures is often criticised for its gameplay and setting being too much of a departure from the other Star Fox games, in favor of the "Zelda-style" gameplay. Casamassina said that "fans expecting a true Star Fox experience akin to the older games are in for a disappointment". He said the Star Fox license had been used sparingly to the point where the game felt "out of place within the confines of the Star Fox game universe". Casamassina said that Fox was "clearly only on 'Dinosaur Planet' at Nintendo's request, not because he belongs". NGC Magazine questioned why Fox was added, writing that Adventures was "one game Fox himself would probably want to forget" and speculated that Nintendo added the Star Fox license to prevent Dinosaur Planet from appearing on the Xbox.

GameSpot named Star Fox Adventures the second-best GameCube game of September 2002. It was nominated for GameSpot's annual "Best Action Adventure Game", "Best Music", "Best Graphics (Technical)" and "Best Graphics (Artistic)" awards among GameCube games.
