= Star Fox 64 3D =

2011 video game

- Packaging artwork release for all the territories
- Developers: Nintendo EAD; Q-Games
- Publisher: Nintendo
- Director: Dylan Cuthbert
- Producer: Tadashi Sugiyama
- Composer: Satomi Terui
- Series: Star Fox
- Platform: Nintendo 3DS
- Release: JP: July 14, 2011; NA/EU: September 9, 2011; AU: September 15, 2011; KO: August 30, 2012; CHN: March 15, 2013
- Genres: Rail shooter, shoot 'em up
- Modes: Single-player, multiplayer

Star Fox 64 3D is a 2011 rail shooter game co-developed by Nintendo EAD and Q-Games, and published by Nintendo for the Nintendo 3DS. It is a remake of the 1997 video game Star Fox 64 for the Nintendo 64. It was released on July 14, 2011, in Japan, followed by other markets in September.

Although the original Nintendo 64 version was called Lylat Wars in Europe and Australia, as well as in its Virtual Console re-releases, the 3DS remake adopts the Star Fox 64 moniker in all regions. In 2012, Nintendo re-released this game, along with several other earlier 3DS titles, as a digital download via the Nintendo eShop. The downloadable version was released in PAL regions on October 4, October 18 in North America, and November 1 in Japan. The game received positive reviews from critics who praised the gameplay, updated graphics and visuals and faithfulness to the original, though it was criticized for its lack of online multiplayer and limited amount of new content. A second Star Fox 64 remake, simply titled Star Fox, released on June 25, 2026.

== Gameplay ==
Gameplay screenshot of Star Fox 64 3D, featuring the gameplay on the top screen and the HUD on the bottom screen, with Falco asking for help

With a few exceptions, the gameplay in Star Fox 64 3D is very similar to that of the original N64 version. The player controls Fox's Arwing fighter jet using the Circle Pad to steer, the shoulder buttons to bank left and right, and the four right-hand buttons to fire lasers and bombs, boost, and brake. The directional pad allows the player to perform somersaults and U-Turns, which can also be performed with combinations of other controls, and to zoom in and out from the Arwing in "All-Range Mode". The player can also enable "Gyro Controls", using the 3DS's internal gyroscope sensor to control the Arwing. Character dialogue, messages, and control information are displayed on the bottom screen.

The single-player campaign features two modes: "64 Mode", which replicates the original game's objectives and difficulty, and "3DS Mode", in which difficulty and objectives have been tuned and balanced to account for the 3D perspective and gyro controls. A third "Expert" mode can be unlocked during gameplay, adding the difficulty of the original game's expert setting. Each mode separately tracks the player's scores and medals.

Star Fox 64 3D also features a new multiplayer "Battle Mode", which allows players to play up to 4-player local multiplayer (via Download Play), or to battle against CPU opponents. During battles, each player's face can appear on opponents' screens in a live reaction feed from the console's internal camera.

This multiplayer mode is completely separate from the single-player game and does not offer any bonus content, whereas the Nintendo 64 version allowed players to unlock the "Landmaster" tank and "on-foot" modes after completing certain requirements in the campaign. It also does not support online play.

== Plot ==
The game is set on a group of planets in the Lylat System. The ingenious scientist Andross, a native of the fourth planet Corneria, is driven into madness and nearly destroys the planet using biological weapons. For Andross' treason, General Pepper exiles the scientist to the remote planet Venom. Five years after Andross' exile, Pepper detects unknown activity on Venom. Pepper hires the Star Fox team (consisting of the team leader James McCloud, and the team members Peppy Hare, and Pigma Dengar) to investigate. Upon arriving, Pigma betrays the team and as a result James ends up captured and killed by Andross, while Peppy barely escapes from Venom and returns to Corneria to tell James's son Fox McCloud about father's death. A few years passed, Andross has again invade the Lylat System, causing Pepper to call on the new Star Fox team, headed by Fox, to battle Andross and free the Lylat system once again.

== Development ==
At the 2010 E3 conference, Nintendo announced a remake of Star Fox 64 for the Nintendo 3DS, entitled Star Fox 64 3D. There was a demo tested the same day at Nintendo E3 2010. The demonstration had controls and character dialogue displayed on the touch screen. Nintendo added a kind of control that makes use of Nintendo 3DS's gyroscope to control the Arwing in space. At E3 2011, Nintendo confirmed a multiplayer for up to four players via 3DS Download Play.

At the annual E3 event during the Nintendo Q&A session held in June 2011, Miyamoto jokingly stated that he warned the developers that if Star Fox 64 3D was not the best game in the series, or did not make a lot of money, the franchise would have to be discontinued.

In an interview with the Official Nintendo Magazine, the game's planner Yusuke Amano reveals the reason why online support for the game was not implemented, stating that "just making multiplayer parts of existing games playable online isn't enough to create a satisfying experience for users. The popular online games work in lots of things, so they play well online - and if we wanted to satisfy everyone who bought the game, the costs required for including online support would be vast". Amano also cited that there were other reasons, such as time limits in development, and the developers' increased focus towards the graphics, in an attempt to amplify the appeal of the Nintendo 3DS console. However, Amano also added he would not rule out the possibility of online play in a future Star Fox game.

== Reception ==
Reception

Aggregate scores
Aggregator	Score
GameRankings	81.71%
Metacritic	81/100

Review scores
Publication	Score
1Up.com	A
Destructoid	8.5/10
Edge	8/10
Eurogamer	8/10
G4	3/5
Game Informer	8.25/10
GamePro	4/5
GameSpot	7.5/10
GamesRadar+	3.5/5
GameTrailers	7.3/10
Giant Bomb	3/5
IGN	9/10
Nintendo Life	8/10
Nintendo Power	8/10
Nintendo World Report	9/10
Official Nintendo Magazine	94%
VideoGamer.com	8/10

Star Fox 64 3D has received positive reviews, with a Metacritic score of 81, based on 65 reviews. Most critics agreed that it remained enjoyable. Critics praised its gameplay, visuals, and upgrades, with acclaim for its attention to detail and full recreation of the original. Common complaints, though, include a lack of online multiplayer and that the game is too similar to the original, claiming new content should have been included.

In October 2015, the game was inducted into the Nintendo Selects range in Europe, indicating global sales of over 1 million units. This was followed by Australia in May 2016, and North America in February 2019.
