= List of Steve Blum performances =

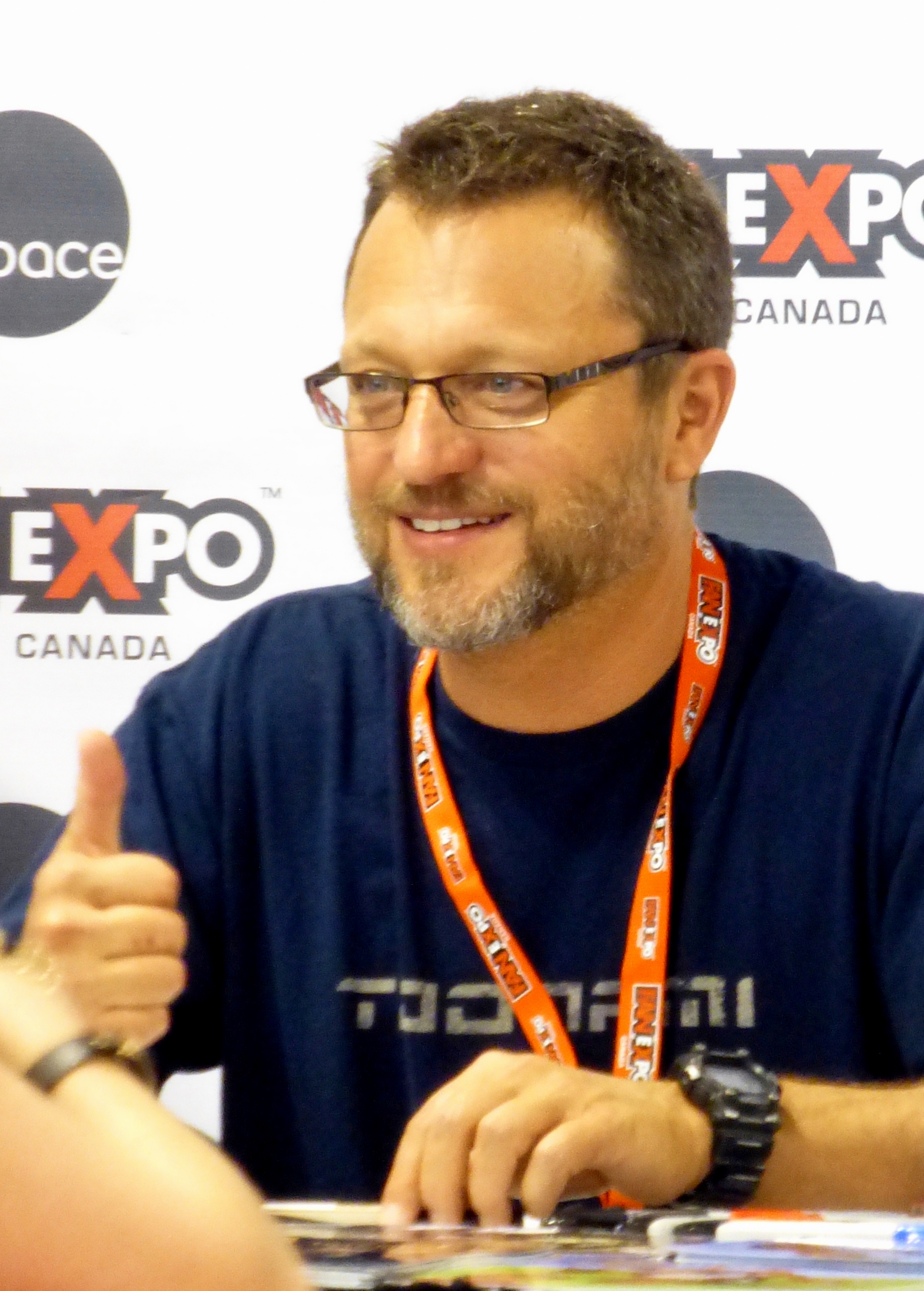
Blum in 2014

Steve Blum is an American voice actor with roles in films, television series and video games.

== Film ==
| Year | Title | Role | Notes | Ref(s) |
|---|---|---|---|---|
| 1984 | Countdown to Looking Glass | Mr. Marty Schindler | Credited as David Lucas | Resume |
| 1986 | The Manhattan Project | Laser Efficiency Kid | Credited as Richard Cardona | Resume |
| 1998 | Shadow Builder | Shadowbuilder | | |
| 2000 | Digimon: The Movie | Computer Voice 1, Poromon, Flamedramon, Raidramon, Magnamon | | |
| 2001 | Akira | Resistance Member | English dub | |
| 2005 | Digimon: Revenge of Diaboromon | Poromon | | Resume |
| 2005 | Digimon: Battle of Adventurers | Guilmon / Growlmon | | |
| 2005 | Digimon: Runaway Locomon | Guilmon / Growlmon / Gallantmon / Gallantmon Crimson Mode (share with Brian Beacock), Mitsuo Yamaki, Kenta Kitagawa, Rika's Father | | |
| 2005 | Digimon: Island of Lost Digimon | J.P. Shibayama | | |
| 2007 | Doraemon: Nobita's New Great Adventure into the Underworld | Demon King, Gian | | Resume |
| 2008 | Adventures in Voice Acting | Himself | Documentary on voice acting | |
| 2012 | A Cat in Paris | Nico | English dub | |
| 2013 | I Know That Voice | Himself | Documentary | |
| 2014 | The Boxtrolls | Shoe; Sparky | | |
| 2014 | Stand by Me Doraemon | Yoshio Minamoto | | |
| 2015 | Hotel Transylvania 2 | Additional Voices | | |
| 2017 | Top Cat Begins | Goon, Muscular Dog | | |
| 2018 | Gnome Alone | Troggs | | |
| 2018 | Bumblebee | Wheeljack | | |
| 2019 | Shazam! | Envy, Gluttony | | |
| 2019 | Promare | Ignis Ex | English dub | |
| 2019 | Manou The Swift | Seagulls | English dub | |
| 2020 | Dragon Quest: Your Story | Gootrude | English dub | |
| 2021 | The Witcher: Nightmare of the Wolf | Leshy | Cameo | |
| 2023 | Taz: Quest for Burger | Tasmanian Devil | Direct-to-video | |
| 2023 | Lego Marvel Avengers: Code Red | Wolverine, Hydra Goons | Disney+ special | |
| 2024 | Transformers One | Iacon 5000 Announcer, Guard #1 | | |
| 2024 | Lego Marvel Avengers: Mission Demolition | Wolverine, Gambit, Trapster | Disney+ special | |
| 2026 | The Mandalorian and Grogu | Garazeb "Zeb" Orrelios | | |

=== Direct-to-video films ===
List of voice performances in direct-to-video films
| Year | Title | Role | Notes | Source |
|---|---|---|---|---|
| 1989 | Goku Midnight Eye | Goku | | Resume |
| 1993 | Outlanders | Operator | | Resume |
| 1994 | Street Fighter II: The Movie | T. Hawk, Ring Announcer | As Roger Canfield | Resume |
| 1994 | Macross Plus | Marj Gueldola | | Resume |
| 1995 | Black Magic M-66 | Professor Matthew, Soldier | | Resume |
| 1995 | Royal Space Force: The Wings of Honnêamise | General's Assistant, Noble | | Resume |
| 1995–96 | Josh Kirby... Time Warrior! | Prism Vocal Effects | As David Lucas | Resume |
| 1996 | They Were Eleven | Rednose, Amazon, King | | Resume |
| 1996 | Ghost in the Shell | Section 9 Staff Cyberneticist, Coroner | As Roger Canfield; Also Ghost in the Shell 2.0 | Resume |
| 1997 | Tokyo Revelation | Kojiro Soma | Animaze dub | Resume |
| 1997 | Armitage III: Poly-Matrix | Kelly's Manager | | Resume |
| 1999 | Street Fighter Alpha: The Animation | Ken Masters | | Resume |
| 2001 | Ah! My Goddess: The Movie | Celestine | As David Lucas | Resume |
| 2001 | Sakura Wars: The Movie | Yuichi Kayama | | Resume |
| 2002 | Metropolis | Acetylene Lamp | | |
| 2002 | Mobile Suit Gundam: The Movie Trilogy | Char Aznable | As David Lucas | Resume |
| 2002 | Cowboy Bebop: The Movie | Spike Spiegel | | Resume |
| 2003 | The Era of Vampires | Hei | Live-action dub | Resume |
| 2003 | Cardcaptor Sakura Movie 2: The Sealed Card | Yoshiyuki Terada | As Andrew Watton | Resume |
| 2003 | The Little Polar Bear | Henry | | Resume |
| 2005 | Escape from Cluster Prime | Smytus | | Resume |
| 2006 | Final Fantasy VII: Advent Children | Vincent Valentine | | Resume |
| 2007 | Ben 10: Secret of the Omnitrix | Vilgax, Heatblast, Nightmarish Alien, Lepidopterran Prisoner | | |
| 2007 | Nomad: The Warrior | Shaman | Live-action dub | Resume |
| 2008 | Strait Jacket | Leiot Steinberg | | |
| 2008 | Resident Evil: Degeneration | Greg Glenn | | Resume |
| 2009 | Hulk Vs | Logan / Wolverine | Segment: "Hulk vs. Wolverine" | |
| 2010 | Dante's Inferno: An Animated Epic | Lucifer | | Resume |
| 2010 | DC Showcase: Green Arrow | Count Vertigo | Released as an extra on Superman/Batman: Apocalypse | |
| 2011 | All-Star Superman | Atlas | | |
| 2011 | Green Lantern: Emerald Knights | Kloba Vud | | |
| 2011 | Batman: Year One | Stan | | |
| 2012 | Ben 10: Destroy All Aliens | Heatblast, Mechamorph Armor | | |
| 2013 | Lego Batman: The Movie – DC Super Heroes Unite | Bane, Penguin | | Resume |
| 2013 | Justice League: The Flashpoint Paradox | Lex Luthor | | |
| 2013 | Scooby-Doo! and the Spooky Scarecrow | Clem, Abner | | |
| 2013 | Transformers Prime Beast Hunters: Predacons Rising | Starscream, Darksteel | | |
| 2013 | Lego Marvel Super Heroes: Maximum Overload | Wolverine | | |
| 2014 | Justice League: War | Darkseid | | |
| 2015 | Justice League: Throne of Atlantis | Lex Luthor | | |
| 2015 | Expelled from Paradise | Zarik "Dingo" Kajiwara | BTVA Award for Best Male Lead Vocal Performance in an Anime Movie/Special | |
| 2015 | Batman Unlimited: Monster Mayhem | Gruff Cop, Watchman | | |
| 2015 | The Last: Naruto the Movie | Third Tsuchikage Ohnoki | | |
| 2015 | Regular Show: The Movie | Techmo, Commander, TV Game | | |
| 2015 | Marvel Super Hero Adventures: Frost Fight! | Santa Claus | | |
| 2016 | Batman: Bad Blood | Black Mask, Firefly | | |
| 2016 | Justice League vs. Teen Titans | Lex Luthor | | |
| 2016 | Scooby-Doo! and WWE: Curse of the Speed Demon | Inferno | | |
| 2019 | Code Geass: Lelouch of the Re;surrection | Kyoshiro Tohdoh | | Voice123 |
| 2019 | Critters Attack! | Critters | | |
| 2019 | Lego DC Batman: Family Matters | Jonathan Crane / Scarecrow | | |
| 2020 | Mortal Kombat Legends: Scorpion's Revenge | Sub-Zero / Bi-Han | | |
| 2021 | DC Showcase: Kamandi: The Last Boy on Earth! | Golgan, Tuftan | | |
| 2022 | Catwoman: Hunted | Solomon Grundy, Abaddon, Pilot | | |
| 2024 | Digimon Adventure 02: Digimon Hurricane Touchdown!! / Transcendent Evolution! The Golden Digimentals | Flamedramon, Raidramon, Magnamon, Poromon | Discotek dub | |

== Television ==
=== Anime ===
List of voice performances in anime
| Year | Title | Role | Notes | Source |
|---|---|---|---|---|
| 1992 | Super Dimensional Fortress Macross II: Lovers Again | Nexx, Lord Feff | L.A. Hero dub | CA |
| 1992–93 | Guyver Bio Booster Armor series | Agito Makishima, Thancrus | | CA |
| 1993 | Giant Robo | Genya | Animaze/L.A. Hero dub | CA |
| 1993 | Ambassador Magma | Fumiaki Asaka, Magma | 1993 OVA series | |
| 1994 | Moldiver | Kaoru Misaki | Grouped under "English Voice Talent" | |
| 1996 | Hyper Doll | Zaiclit's Assistant | Ep. 2 As David Lucas | |
| 1997 | Perfect Blue | Mima Fan, Truck Driver | As David Lucas | |
| 1998 | Bastard!! | Ninja Master Gara | As David Lucas; OVA series (Animaze/Pioneer dub); Grouped under "English Voice Talent" | CA |
| 1999 | Cowboy Bebop | Spike Spiegel | As David Lucas | |
| 2000 | Digimon Adventure 02 | BlackWarGreymon, Flamedramon, Raidramon, Magnamon | Also ADR script writer | CA |
| 2000 | Dinozaurs | Drago Wing | | CA |
| 2000 | The Legend of Black Heaven | Joseph Watanabe | As David Lucas; Grouped under "English Voice Talent" | |
| 2001 | Digimon Tamers | Guilmon, Growlmon, WarGrowlmon, Megidramon, Gallantmon, Gallantmon Crimson Mode (shared with Brian Beacock) Gigimon, Mitsuo Yamaki, Kenta Kitagawa | Also ADR script writer | CA |
| 2001 | The Big O | Roger Smith | | |
| 2001 | Rurouni Kenshin | Shishio Makoto, Toma Sakaki | As David Lucas | |
| 2001 | Saint Tail | Father (Genichirou Haneoka) | | |
| 2001 | Rave Master | Young Shiba | | |
| 2002 | Digimon Frontier | J.P. Shibayama, Beetlemon, MetalKabuterimon | Also ADR script writer | CA |
| 2002 | Great Teacher Onizuka | Eikichi Onizuka | As David Lucas | |
| 2002 | I'm Gonna Be An Angel! | Yuusuke Kamoshita | As David Lucas; Synch-Point dub | |
| 2002 | Samurai Girl: Real Bout High School | Shizuma Kusanagi | As David Lucas | |
| 2002 | Shinzo | Sago | | CA |
| 2003 | S-CRY-ed | Kazuma | | CA |
| 2003 | Initial D | Keisuke "K.T." Takahashi | Tokyopop dub | |
| 2003 | Witch Hunter Robin | Akio Kurosawa | As Steven Jay Blum | |
| 2004 | Wolf's Rain | Darcia | | CA |
| 2005 | Zatch Bell! | Gofure, Shin | | CA |
| 2005 | Planetes | Kho Cheng-Shin | | |
| 2005–06 | Samurai Champloo | Mugen | As Daniel Andrews | Website |
| 2005–06 | Immortal Grand Prix | Alex Cunningham | | |
| 2005–09 | Naruto | Orochimaru, Zabuza Momochi, Kisame Hoshigaki, Sazanami | | |
| 2007–08 | Blood+ | Moses, Aston Collins | | |
| 2007–08 | Digimon Data Squad | Falcomon, Peckmon, Crowmon, Ravemon | | CA |
| 2008 | Gurren Lagann | Leeron Littner | | |
| 2008–09 | Code Geass: Lelouch of the Rebellion series | Kyoshiro Tohdoh | | Voice123 |
| 2009–13 | Stitch! | Sparky, Felix, BooGoo | | Press |
| 2009–19 | Naruto: Shippuden | Orochimaru, Kisame Hoshigaki, Zabuza Momochi, Onoki, Ao, Chōmei, others | | Press |
| 2011 | Ghost Slayers Ayashi | Ryūdō Yukiatsu | | |
| 2011 | Durarara!! | Kyohei Kadota | | |
| 2011 | Marvel Anime: Wolverine | Kikyo Mikage | | |
| 2011–12 | Marvel Anime: X-Men | Logan / Wolverine | | |
| 2012 | Marvel Anime: Blade | Kikyo Mikage, Captain McRay | | |
| 2012–13 | Tiger & Bunny | Jake Martinez | | |
| 2015–16 | Durarara!!×2 | Kyohei Kadota | | |
| 2018 | FLCL Alternative | Yoga | | |
| 2018–present | Baki | Doppo, Shinshikai 2, Additional Voices | Netflix ONA | |
| 2019–23 | Boruto: Naruto Next Generations | Orochimaru, Onoki, Ao, Tofu | | |
| 2019–22 | Ultraman | Adad, Mochigon, West High Student, Criminal, Man in Green Sweater, Man in Sweater | Netflix ONA | |
| 2020 | Scissor Seven | Chicken Farm Boss, Latte, Wedding Guest, Passerby, Boy, Stanian, Rich Man, Leader of the Killer League | | |
| 2020 | Demon Slayer: Kimetsu no Yaiba | Kyogai | | |
| 2020 | Sword Art Online: Alicization | Vixur Ul Shasta | | |
| 2020 | Marvel Future Avengers | Kang the Conqueror | | |
| 2020 | Ghost in the Shell: SAC 2045 | CEO of Obsidian, Patrick Huge, Hemp Man, Government Official, Additional Voices | Netflix ONA | |

=== Animation ===
List of voice performances in animation
| Year | Title | Role | Notes | Source |
|---|---|---|---|---|
| 1996–2000 | KaBlam! | Prometheus | Segment: Prometheus and Bob; 38 episodes | |
| 2001 | Totally Spies! | King | Episode: "Stuck in the Middle Ages with You" | |
| 2002–05 | What's New, Scooby-Doo? | Melbourne O'Reilly, Guide, J.T. Page, Rama Yam, Rufus Raucous, Spencer Johnson, Steve Powell | | |
| 2003 | The Powerpuff Girls | Various voices | Episode: "Monstra-City" | |
| 2003–05 | My Life as a Teenage Robot | Smytus, others | | |
| 2004–05 | Megas XLR | Jamie, various voices | | |
| 2004–05 | Harvey Birdman, Attorney at Law | Yakky Doodle, Stavros, Clamhead | 2 episodes | |
| 2004–07 | The Grim Adventures of Billy & Mandy | Various voices | | |
| 2005 | Loonatics Unleashed | Fuz-Z | Episode: "Attack of the Fuzz Balls" | |
| 2005–06 | W.I.T.C.H. | Blunk, Raythor, Candy Man, others | | |
| 2005–08 | Ben 10 | Vilgax, Heatblast, Ghostfreak, others | | |
| 2008–09 | The Spectacular Spider-Man | Green Goblin, The Chameleon, Dilbert Trilby, Blackie Gaxton, Seymour O'Reilly, Matthew Resnick, Homonculi | | Press |
| 2008–09 | Wolverine and the X-Men | James "Logan" Howlett / Wolverine, others | | Press |
| 2009 | G.I. Joe: Resolute | Duke, Roadblock, Zartan, Wild Bill | | |
| 2009–11 | The Super Hero Squad Show | Wolverine, Abomination | | |
| 2010 | Chowder | Limon, Ninja | Episode: "Gazpacho!" | |
| 2010 | Jonah Hex: Motion Comics | Voice Actors | | |
| 2010 | Mari-Kari | Larry | FEARnet show | |
| 2010 | Batman: The Brave and the Bold | Heat Wave, Captain Cold | Episode: "Requiem for a Scarlet Speedster!" | |
| 2010–12 | The Avengers: Earth's Mightiest Heroes | Wolverine, Red Skull, Beta Ray Bill, Ogre, Hydra Scientist | | |
| 2010–13 | Transformers: Prime | Starscream, Bombshock | Nominated – BTVA Award for Best New Vocal Interpretation of an Established Character, 2012; Nominated – Best Male Lead Vocal Performance in a Television Series – Action/Drama, 2013 | |
| 2010–17 | Regular Show | Techmo, John "Muscle Bro" Sorrenstein, Grand Master of Death Kwon Do, Carter, Barry, others | | |
| 2010–17 | Uncle Grandpa | Ham Sandwich Jones, Additional Voices | | |
| 2011–19 | Young Justice | Count Vertigo, Rudy West, Rocket Red, Henchy, Wilhelm Peters | | |
| 2012 | Secret Mountain Fort Awesome | Ham Sandwich Jones | | |
| 2012 | Generator Rex | Sebastian, Leon, Additional Voices | Episode: "Rock My World" | |
| 2012–14 | The Legend of Korra | Amon, Baraz, Crazy Yao, Hunter #2, Red Lotus Guard #1, Spirit Frog, Additional Voices | Nominated – BTVA Award for Best Male Vocal Performance in a Television Series in a Supporting Role – Action/Drama, 2013 | |
| 2012–14 | Ultimate Spider-Man | Wolverine, Beetle, Doc Samson, Ka-Zar, various voices | | |
| 2012–16 | Transformers: Rescue Bots | Heatwave, others | | |
| 2013 | Rocket Dog | Derek | | |
| 2013–14 | Ben 10: Omniverse | Vilgax, Vilgax Drones, Ghostfreak, Hobble, Zs'Skayr, Helena Xagliv, Addwaitya, Bill Gacks, Ectonurite Twins, Mino-Toga, Pa Vreedle, Thaddeus J. Collins | | |
| 2013–15 | Hulk and the Agents of S.M.A.S.H. | Sauron, Devil Dinosaur, Wolverine, Wrecker | | |
| 2013–20 | Doc McStuffins | Commander Crush, various voices | 10 episodes | |
| 2014 | Turbo Fast | Rockwell | 2 episodes | |
| 2014 | Wander Over Yonder | General Outrage, Scientist Watchdog, Additional Voices | Episode: "The Big Job/The Helper" | |
| 2014 | Teenage Mutant Ninja Turtles | Speed Demon, Human Driver, TV Announcer | Episode: "Race with the Demon!" | |
| 2014–18 | Star Wars Rebels | Garazeb "Zeb" Orrelios, Alton Kastle, others | 68 episodes | |
| 2015–19 | New Looney Tunes | Jack, Barbarian | | |
| 2015–16 | Mixels | King Nixel, Kamzo | 2 episodes | |
| 2015–16 | TripTank | Benjamin Franklin, Alien Caller | 2 episodes | |
| 2015–17 | Pickle and Peanut | Hunter, Additional Voices | Episode: "Pigfoot/Tae Kwan Bro" | |
| 2015, 2017–19 | Niko and the Sword of Light | Rasper, Nar Est, Giant Headwood Tree, Brohan, Breadtroll, Guard, Solfeggio, Fred, Shrimp Trooper, Scarpe, Mingus | | |
| 2016 | Transformers: Robots in Disguise | Aerobolt, Starscream, others | 6 episodes | |
| 2016–17 | Avengers Assemble | Kang the Conqueror, Kang Head, Biker | 6 episodes | |
| 2016, 2018–19 | The Lion Guard | Makucha | 11 episodes | |
| 2017 | Penn Zero: Part-Time Hero | Snow Monkey Bus | Episode: "Ninki Ninja Fight Town" | |
| 2017 | Be Cool, Scooby-Doo! | Various voices | 2 episodes | |
| 2017 | The Mr. Peabody & Sherman Show | Edgar Allan Poe | Episode: "Edgar Allan Poe" | |
| 2017–20 | Rapunzel's Tangled Adventure | Attila, Moosehead, Additional Voices | 20 episodes | |
| 2017–20 | Dorothy and the Wizard of Oz | Frank, various voices | 46 episodes | |
| 2018 | Kung Fu Panda: The Paws of Destiny | Jindiao, Red Phoenix | 13 episodes | |
| 2019 | Star Wars: Resistance | Leoz, Stormtrooper #2, Trooper CS-515 | 3 episodes | |
| 2019 | Spider-Man | Security Guard | Episode: "My Own Worst Enemy" | |
| 2020 | Kipo and the Age of Wonderbeasts | Yumyan Hammerpaw | 9 episodes | |
| 2020 | DC Super Hero Girls | Fuseli | Episode: "#LivingtheNightmare" | |
| 2020 | ThunderCats Roar | Emperor Toadius | Episode: "Prince Starling's Quest" | |
| 2020 | Looney Tunes Cartoons | Goon | Episode: "Overdue Duck" | |
| 2020 | Monkie Kid: A Hero is Born | Demon Bull King, Shoe Store Assistant | Television film | |
| 2020 | The Rocketeer | Ivan the Strongman, Ringmaster | 2 episodes | |
| 2020 | Robot Chicken | Zartan | Episode: "Ghandi Mulholland in: Plastic Doesn't Get Cancer" | |
| 2020–24 | Lego Monkie Kid | Demon Bull King, Huntsman, The Mayor, General Ironclad, Mr. Dragon, Bull Clones | | |
| 2021 | Trese | Datu Talagbusao / Ibwa | English dub, 6 episodes | |
| 2021–22 | The Owl House | Salty | 2 episodes | |
| 2022 | Ridley Jones | Aesop | Episode: "Mask Mayhem" | |
| 2022 | Love, Death & Robots | Private Macy, Private Coutts | Episode: "Kill Team Kill" | |
| 2022 | Bee and PuppyCat: Lazy in Space | Space Outlaw | Episode: "Funny Lying" | |
| 2022–24 | Transformers: EarthSpark | Starscream | 5 episodes | |
| 2023 | Star Wars: Visions | Commander | Episode: "The Pit" | |
| 2023–24 | Star Wars: The Bad Batch | Lanse Crowder, Mister Eenta, Villager, Stormtrooper, Villager #1, Stormtrooper #2, Warden | 3 episodes | |
| 2024 | Star Wars: Tales of the Empire | New Republic Guard, Reggi, Attendant #1 | 2 episodes | |
| 2024–25 | Jurassic World: Chaos Theory | Carl, DPW Officer Jensen, Additional Voices | 7 episodes | |
| 2025 | Star Wars: Tales of the Underworld | Smuggler, Stormtrooper | 2 episodes | |
| 2025 | Bat-Fam | Killer Croc | | |
| 2025 | Lego Marvel Avengers: Strange Tails | Wolverine, J. Jonah Jameson | Disney+ Television film | |
| 2025 | The Mighty Nein | Paul | Episode: "Who Will You Be?" | |
| 2026 | Star Wars: Maul – Shadow Lord | Henchman #3, Icarus, Pyke Pilot #2 | 7 episodes | |
| 2026 | My Adventures with Superman | Eradicator | 3 episodes | |

=== Live-action television ===
List of performances in live-action television
| Year | Title | Role | Notes | Source |
|---|---|---|---|---|
| 2016 | Legends of Tomorrow | Chronos | Voice, 4 episodes | |
| 2022–23 | The Villains of Valley View | Onyx | Voice, 5 episodes | |
| 2023 | The Mandalorian | Garazeb "Zeb" Orrelios | Episode: "Chapter 21: The Pirate"; Voice | |

== Video games ==
List of voice performances in video games
| Year | Title | Role | Notes | Source |
|---|---|---|---|---|
| 1995 | Full Throttle | Sid | | |
| 1995 | The Dig | Ludger Brink, Cocytan Leader, Borneo Space Observer | | |
| 1997 | Dragon Ball GT: Final Bout | Goku, Vegito | | |
| 1998 | Quest for Glory 5: Dragon Fire | Abduel, Andre, Kokeeno, Magnum Opus, Parrot, Salim | | |
| 1998 | Star Wars: Rebellion | Imperial Pilot, Pilot, Green Group Leader | | |
| 1999 | Gundam Side Story 0079: Rise from the Ashes | Maximilian Berger | Credited as David Lucas | |
| 1999 | Rugrats: Studio Tour | Hayashi, Space Director, Western Director, Racetrack Announcer | | |
| 1999 | Star Wars: X-Wing Alliance | Olin Garn, Civilian Pilot 2, Imperial Zero-G Stormtrooper | | |
| 1999 | Crusaders of Might and Magic | Voice | | |
| 2001 | The Bouncer | Kou Leifoh | Credited as David Lucas | |
| 2001 | Phase Paradox | Additional Voices | Credited as David Lucas | |
| 2002 | Digimon Rumble Arena | Guilmon, Gallantmon, BlackWarGreymon, Reapermon (Boss) | | |
| 2002 | Alpine Racer 3 | Jose Helguera | Credited as David Lucas | |
| 2002 | Star Wars Jedi Knight II: Jedi Outcast | Galak Fyyar | | |
| 2002 | Warcraft III: Reign of Chaos | Tauren (Unit) | | |
| 2003 | Command & Conquer: Generals | USA Rocket Soldier (Unit) | | |
| 2003 | Evil Dead: A Fistful of Boomstick | Bartender, Male Deadites | Also additional voices | |
| 2003 | Warcraft III: The Frozen Throne | Tauren (Unit), Anub'arak, Rexxar | | |
| 2003 | Arc the Lad: Twilight of the Spirits | Volk | | |
| 2003 | Star Wars: Knights of the Old Republic | Additional voices | | |
| 2003 | Bionicle | Kopaka | | |
| 2003 | Command & Conquer: Generals - Zero Hour | Additional Voices | | |
| 2003 | Call of Duty | Capt. Foley | | |
| 2003 | The Lord of the Rings: War of the Ring | Varin, Gondor Swordsmen, Dwarf Shieldbreaker | | |
| 2003 | Crash Nitro Kart | Crash Bandicoot, Emperor Velo | | |
| 2003 | Ratchet & Clank: Going Commando | Thug Leader | | |
| 2003 | Spawn: Armageddon | Violator | | |
| 2003 | Mission: Impossible – Operation Surma | Ethan Hunt | | |
| 2003–04 | .hack series | Wiseman, Sanjuro | | |
| 2004 | Pitfall: The Lost Expedition | Pitfall Harry | | |
| 2004 | Gungrave: Overdose | Bunji Kugashira, Fangoram, Zell Conderbrave | | |
| 2004 | Metal Gear Solid: The Twin Snakes | Genome Soldiers | | |
| 2004 | Ground Control II: Operation Exodus | G'hall Vicath, K'haunir Vicath | | |
| 2004 | Tribes: Vengeance | Jericho | | |
| 2004 | Shadow Ops: Red Mercury | Frank Hayden | | |
| 2004 | Doom 3 | Additional Voices | Also Resurrection of Evil | |
| 2004 | Ace Combat 5: The Unsung War | Jack Bartlett / Heartbreak One | | |
| 2004 | Call of Duty: United Offensive | Captain Foley, Additional Voices | | |
| 2004 | X-Men Legends | Wolverine | | |
| 2004 | Vampire: The Masquerade – Bloodlines | Andrei | | |
| 2005 | The Punisher | Bullseye, Matt Murdock | Grouped under "Additional Voice Talent" | |
| 2005 | Shadow of Rome | Additional voices | | |
| 2005 | God of War | Ares | | |
| 2005 | Psychonauts | G-Men, Lungfish Zealot, Tiger | | |
| 2005 | Samurai Western | Ralph Norman, Gunman | | |
| 2005 | Area 51 | Additional Voices | | |
| 2005 | Destroy All Humans! | Psi-G Man | | |
| 2005 | Killer7 | Kenjiro Matsuoka, Benjamin Keane, Trevor Pearlharbor, Additional Voices | | |
| 2005 | X-Men Legends II: Rise of Apocalypse | Wolverine, Omega Red | | |
| 2005 | Quake 4 | Marines | | |
| 2005 | Star Wars: Battlefront II | Male Alliance Infantry #1 | | |
| 2005 | 007: From Russia with Love | Additional Voices | | |
| 2005 | Neopets: The Darkest Faerie | Kelland the Quick, Old Beggar | | |
| 2006 | Ape Escape 3 | Monkey Yellow (NTSC-U version) | | |
| 2006 | Star Wars: Empire at War | Empire HUD, Stormtrooper, Additional Voices | Also Forces of Corruption | |
| 2006 | The Lord of the Rings: The Battle for Middle-earth II | Gloin | | |
| 2006 | Final Fantasy XII | Ba'Gamnan | | |
| 2006 | Guild Wars Factions | Voice Actors | | |
| 2006 | X-Men: The Official Game | Jason Stryker, Additional Voices | | |
| 2006 | Pirates of the Caribbean: The Legend of Jack Sparrow | Black Smoke James, Gibbs, Spanish Soldier, Cursed Pirate, Capture Pirate #2, Captured Pirate #4 | | |
| 2006 | Dirge of Cerberus: Final Fantasy VII | Vincent Valentine | | |
| 2006 | Dead Rising | Cliff Hudson, Roger Hall, Additional Voices | | |
| 2006 | Xenosaga Episode III: Also sprach Zarathustra | Canaan, Sellers | | |
| 2006 | Company of Heroes | Intel and Base Commander | | |
| 2006 | Age of Empires III: The WarChiefs | Colonel Kuechler | | |
| 2006 | Destroy All Humans! 2: Make War Not Love | Additional Voices | | |
| 2006 | Justice League Heroes | White Martian Leader | As Steven Jay Blum | |
| 2006 | The Sopranos: Road to Respect | Additional Voices | | |
| 2006 | Metal Gear Solid: Portable Ops | Gene | | |
| 2006 | Marvel: Ultimate Alliance | Wolverine, Venom | | |
| 2006 | 2006–07 | .hack//G.U. series | Yata, Iyoten | |
| 2006 | 2006–16 | Naruto series | Orochimaru, Zabuza Momochi, Teuchi, Ao, Ohnoki | |
| 2007 | Rogue Galaxy | Zegram Ghart | | |
| 2007 | Gurumin: A Monstrous Adventure | Motoro, Bob | | |
| 2007 | Spider-Man 3 | Rhino | | |
| 2007 | Tomb Raider: Anniversary | Tihocan | | |
| 2007 | Transformers: The Game | Trailbreaker | | |
| 2007 | Pirates of the Caribbean: At World's End | Additional Voices | | |
| 2007 | Digimon World Data Squad | Falcomon, Peckmon, Yatagaramon | | |
| 2007 | Halo 3 | Brutes | | |
| 2007 | Clive Barker's Jericho | Cpt. Devin Ross | Grouped under "Cast" | |
| 2007 | Ben 10: Protector of Earth | Heatblast, Ghostfreak, Vilgax | | |
| 2007 | Power Rangers: Super Legends | Lord Zedd | | |
| 2007 | Pirates of the Caribbean Online | Jolly Roger | | |
| 2007 | F.E.A.R. Perseus Mandate | Captain David Raynes, Additional Voices | | |
| 2007 | Uncharted: Drake's Fortune | Descendants | | |
| 2008 | No More Heroes | Dark Star | | |
| 2008 | Ninja Gaiden II | Zedonius | Also Sigma | |
| 2008 | Robert Ludlum's The Bourne Conspiracy | Voice Performance | | |
| 2008 | Ratchet & Clank Future: Quest for Booty | Beacon Operator | Grouped under "Voice-Over Actors" | |
| 2008 | S.T.A.L.K.E.R.: Clear Sky | Cast | | |
| 2008 | Lego Batman: The Videogame | | Grouped under "Talent Credits" | |
| 2008 | Spider-Man: Web of Shadows | Wolverine | | |
| 2008 | Tom Clancy's EndWar | General Scott Mitchell | | |
| 2008 | Valkyria Chronicles | Zaka | | |
| 2008 | Kung Fu Panda: Legendary Warriors | Baboon Minion #1, Gorilla Minion #1 | | |
| 2008 | Call of Duty: World at War | Tank Dempsey | DLC map packs 2 and 3 | |
| 2008 | Naruto: The Broken Bond | Orchimaru, Zabuza Momochi, Additional Cast | | |
| 2008–09 | Star Wars: The Force Unleashed | Stormtroopers | Also II and Ultimate Sith | |
| 2009 | MadWorld | Jack Cayman | | Website |
| 2009 | The Chronicles of Riddick: Assault on Dark Athena | Guard | | |
| 2009 | X-Men Origins: Wolverine | Wade Wilson, Robert Kelly | | |
| 2009 | Bionic Commando | Joseph "Super Joe" Gibson | | |
| 2009 | Transformers: Revenge of the Fallen | Additional Voices | | |
| 2009 | G.I. Joe: The Rise of Cobra | Gung Ho, Iron Grenadier | | |
| 2009 | Batman: Arkham Asylum | Killer Croc, various prison guards | | |
| 2009 | Undead Knights | Demon, King Kirk Gradis | | |
| 2009 | MagnaCarta 2 | Schuenzeit | | |
| 2009 | Uncharted 2: Among Thieves | Serbian Soldiers, Guardians | | |
| 2009 | Brütal Legend | Thunderhogs, Sparkies | | |
| 2009 | Ratchet & Clank Future: A Crack in Time | Agorian Announcer | | |
| 2009 | Dragon Age: Origins | Oghren, Gorim Saelac, Irving | Also Awakening | |
| 2009 | The Saboteur | Father Denis | | |
| 2009 | Naruto Shippuden: Clash of Ninja Revolution III | Other Voices | | |
| 2009–11 | Marvel Super Hero Squad series | Wolverine, Abomination, Heimdall | | |
| 2009–11 | Warhammer 40,000: Dawn of War II | Scout Sergeant Cyrus, Techmarine Martellus, Chaos Lord Eliphas the Inheritor (replacing Paul Dobson), Chaos Space Marine, Ork Boy, Additional Voices | Also Chaos Rising and Retribution | |
| 2009–12 | FusionFall | Vilgax, TOM, Demongo | | |
| 2010 | Army of Two: The 40th Day | Heavy Flamethrower | | |
| 2010 | Mass Effect 2 | Grunt, Additional Voices | | |
| 2010 | Metro 2033 | Hunter | | |
| 2010 | Dead to Rights: Retribution | Temple Guard, Triad | | |
| 2010 | Iron Man 2 | S.H.I.E.L.D. Personal | | |
| 2010 | Metal Gear Solid: Peace Walker | Vladimir Zadornov | | |
| 2010 | Transformers: War for Cybertron | Shockwave, Barricade | | |
| 2010 | Singularity | Nikolai Demichev | | |
| 2010 | Clash of the Titans | Eusabios, Calibos | | |
| 2010 | Mafia II | Chubby | | |
| 2010 | Spider-Man: Shattered Dimensions | Hobgoblin, Vulture | | |
| 2010 | Quantum Theory | Thanatos, Fear, Seed | | |
| 2010 | Final Fantasy XIV | Cast | | |
| 2010 | Vanquish | Lt. Col. Robert Burns | | |
| 2010 | Fallout: New Vegas | Additional Voices | | |
| 2010 | Call of Duty: Black Ops | Tank Dempsey, Additional Voices | | |
| 2011 | Marvel vs. Capcom 3: Fate of Two Worlds | Wolverine, Taskmaster | Also in Ultimate Marvel vs. Capcom 3 | Resume |
| 2011 | Bulletstorm | Grayson Hunt | Nominated – NAVGTR Award, Lead Performance in a Comedy | |
| 2011 | PlayStation Move Heroes | Evil Voice, Agorian Warrior, Board Guard, Dark Daxter | | |
| 2011 | Thor: God of Thunder | Ulik, Mangog | | |
| 2011 | MotorStorm: Apocalypse | Big Dog, Combat Hobo, Announcer | | |
| 2011 | Kung Fu Panda 2 | Komodo Dragon 1, Gorillas, Red Gorilla, Wolf Soldier 1 | | |
| 2011 | Transformers: Dark of the Moon | Starscream, Additional Voices | | |
| 2011 | Shadows of the Damned | Garcia Hotspur, Demons | | |
| 2011 | Captain America: Super Soldier | Baron Zemo, Allied Forces | | |
| 2011 | Dead Island | John Sinamoi, Various Characters | | |
| 2011 | X-Men: Destiny | Wolverine, Pyro | | |
| 2011 | Spider-Man: Edge of Time | Anti-Venom, Big Wheel, Shocker | | |
| 2011 | Batman: Arkham City | Killer Croc, Mr. Sickle | | Tweet |
| 2011 | Ratchet & Clank: All 4 One | Mr. Dinkles | | |
| 2011 | The Lord of the Rings: War in the North | Gloin, Southerner | | |
| 2011 | Saints Row: The Third | Zombie Voice | | |
| 2011 | Star Wars: The Old Republic | Andronikos Revel, Baron Deathmark | | |
| 2012 | Uncharted: Golden Abyss | Mercenaries, Thugs | | |
| 2012 | Kingdoms of Amalur: Reckoning | Other Voices | | |
| 2012 | Asura's Wrath | Sergei | | |
| 2012 | Syndicate | Additional Voices | | |
| 2012 | Mass Effect 3 | Urdnot Grunt | | |
| 2012 | Kinect Fun Labs: Kinect Rush – A Disney Pixar Adventures: Snapshot | Voice Talent | | |
| 2012 | Starhawk | Sheriff Tracy Howell | | |
| 2012 | Diablo III | Zoltun Kulle, Monster Voice Effects | | |
| 2012 | Sorcery | Alchemist, Primus, Elven Assassin | | |
| 2012 | Tom Clancy's Ghost Recon: Future Soldier | Scott Mitchell, Additional Voices | | |
| 2012 | Lego Batman 2: DC Superheroes | Penguin, Bane | | |
| 2012 | The Amazing Spider-Man | Dr. Curt Connors / Lizard | | |
| 2012 | The Secret World | Jack Boone | | |
| 2012 | Darksiders II | The Judicator | | |
| 2012 | Transformers: Fall of Cybertron | Sharpshot, Shockwave, Swindle | | |
| 2012 | Guild Wars 2 | Rytlock Brimstone, Phlunt | | |
| 2012 | Lego The Lord of the Rings | Voice Talent | | |
| 2012 | Transformers Prime: The Game | Starscream | | |
| 2012 | Marvel Avengers: Battle for Earth | Wolverine, Uatu the Watcher | | |
| 2012 | Call of Duty: Black Ops II | Multiplayer, Tank Dempsey | Tank Dempsey in Origins only | |
| 2012–16 | Skylanders series | Auric, Enigma, Tuk, Chop Chop | (Note: Skylanders roles are reprising for later releases.) | |
| 2013 | Anarchy Reigns | Jack Cayman | | |
| 2013 | Sly Cooper: Thieves in Time | Rioichi Cooper, Lizard Guard, Lion, Store Keeper | | |
| 2013 | God of War: Ascension | Ares | | |
| 2013 | BioShock Infinite | Voice Acting Ensemble | | |
| 2013 | The Last of Us | Voice Over Cast | | |
| 2013 | StarCraft II: Heart of the Swarm | Abathur, Dehaka, Yagdra | | |
| 2013 | Fuse | Ivan Sovlenko | | |
| 2013 | Marvel Heroes | Wolverine, Taskmaster, Rocket Raccoon, Mr. Sinister, Sauron | | |
| 2013 | Deadpool | Wolverine | | |
| 2013 | The Wonderful 101 | Gah-Goojin, Wanna, Jergingha | | |
| 2013 | Lego Marvel Super Heroes | | | |
| 2013 | Batman: Arkham Origins | Lester Buchinsky / Electrocutioner | | |
| 2014 | Lightning Returns: Final Fantasy XIII | Additional Voices | | |
| 2014 | Diablo III: Reaper of Souls | Zoltun Kulle, Monster Voice Effects | | |
| 2014 | The Elder Scrolls Online | Additional Voices | | |
| 2014 | The Amazing Spider-Man 2 | Kraven the Hunter | | |
| 2014 | Transformers: Rise of the Dark Spark | Sharpshot, Shockwave, Swindle | | |
| 2014 | Transformers: Universe | Switchblade | | |
| 2014 | Middle-earth: Shadow of Mordor | Sauron, Nemesis Orcs | | |
| 2014 | The Legend of Korra | Hundun | | |
| 2014 | Call of Duty: Advanced Warfare | Additional Cast | | |
| 2014 | Digimon All-Star Rumble | Guilmon/Gallantmon, WarGrowlmon, system voice | | |
| 2015 | The Elder Scrolls Online: Tamriel Unlimited | Additional Voices | Footage | |
| 2015 | Final Fantasy Type-0 HD | Cid | | |
| 2015 | Infinite Crisis | Lex Luthor | Grouped under "Voice Over Talent" | |
| 2015 | Heroes of the Storm | Abathur, Dehaka, Rexxar | | |
| 2015 | Batman: Arkham Knight | Killer Croc, Thugs | | |
| 2015 | Guild Wars 2: Heart of Thorns | Rytlock Brimstone | Also Phlunt | Website |
| 2015 | Transformers: Devastation | Bonecrusher, Defensor, Ground Soldier 1 | | |
| 2015 | Halo 5: Guardians | Multiplayer Team Leader | | |
| 2015 | Call of Duty: Black Ops III | Tank Dempsey | DLC only | |
| 2015 | Disney Infinity 3.0 | | Grouped under "Featuring the Voice Talents" | |
| 2015–16 | Mortal Kombat X | Sub-Zero, Reptile, Bo' Rai Cho | Also in XL | |
| 2015-17 | Lego Dimensions | Commissioner Gordon, Sauron, Bane, Commissioner Gordon (The Lego Batman Movie) | | |
| 2016 | Teenage Mutant Ninja Turtles: Mutants in Manhattan | Krang | | |
| 2016 | Mirror's Edge: Catalyst | Additional Voices | | |
| 2016 | Seven Knights | Additional Voices | | Facebook |
| 2016 | Mighty No. 9 | Mighty No. 8 Countershade | | |
| 2016 | Batman: The Telltale Series | Lady Arkham (Masked), Blockbuster | | |
| 2016 | Deus Ex: Mankind Divided | Additional Voices | | |
| 2016 | Batman: Arkham VR | Thug 1, Killer Croc, Gotham Police 320 | | |
| 2016 | Final Fantasy XV | Verstael Besithia, Additional Voices | | |
| 2017 | Prey | Walther Dahl | | |
| 2017 | Injustice 2 | Hal Jordan / Green Lantern, Sub-Zero, Victor Zsasz | | Tweet |
| 2017 | The Elder Scrolls Online: Morrowind | Additional Voices | Footage | |
| 2017 | LawBreakers | Faust | | |
| 2017 | Guild Wars 2: Path of Fire | Rytlock Brimstone | | |
| 2017 | Middle-earth: Shadow of War | Sauron, Nemesis Orcs | | |
| 2018 | The Elder Scrolls Online: Summerset | Additional Voices | Footage | |
| 2018 | Dota 2 | Grimstroke | | |
| 2018 | Marvel Powers United VR | Wolverine, A.I.M. Eraditron | | |
| 2018 | Lego DC Super-Villains | Captain Cold, Count Vertigo, Deadman, Psimon | | |
| 2018 | Call of Duty: Black Ops 4 | Tank Dempsey | Primis and Ultimis variants of Tank Dempsey | |
| 2018 | Red Dead Redemption 2 | The Local Pedestrian Population | | |
| 2018 | MapleStory | Black Mage | | |
| 2019 | Travis Strikes Again: No More Heroes | Badman, Garcia Hotspur, Narration | | |
| 2019 | Metro Exodus | Sam | | |
| 2019 | The Elder Scrolls Online: Elsweyr | Additional Voices | Footage | |
| 2019 | Judgment | Toru Higashi | | |
| 2019 | Marvel Ultimate Alliance 3: The Black Order | Bullseye, Green Goblin, Venom, Wolverine | | |
| 2019 | Star Wars Jedi: Fallen Order | Voice Talent | | |
| 2019–20 | Mortal Kombat 11 | Sub-Zero, Baraka | Also in Aftermath and Ultimate | |
| 2020 | Valorant | Brimstone | | |
| 2020 | The Elder Scrolls Online: Greymoor | Additional Voices | Footage | |
| 2020 | The Last of Us Part II | Additional Voices | | |
| 2020 | Star Wars: Squadrons | Walla Actor | | |
| 2021 | Hitman 3 | Guard | Uncredited, archive audio | |
| 2021 | The Elder Scrolls Online: Blackwood | Additional Voices | Footage | |
| 2021 | Marvel's Avengers | Klaw / Ulysses Kraue | War for Wakanda DLC story expansion | |
| 2021 | Psychonauts 2 | HQ Agent Crenshaw, Snake Cop | | |
| 2021 | No More Heroes III | Badman | | |
| 2021 | Lost Judgment | Toru Higashi | | |
| 2021 | Demon Slayer: Kimetsu no Yaiba – The Hinokami Chronicles | Kyogai | | |
| 2022 | Guild Wars 2: End of Dragons | Rytlock Brimstone | Also Ivan | |
| 2022 | Chocobo GP | Ramuh | | |
| 2022 | Neon White | Neon White | | |
| 2022 | The Callisto Protocol | Additional Voices | | |
| 2022 | Marvel's Midnight Suns | Wolverine | | |
| 2023 | Star Wars Jedi: Survivor | Additional Voices | | |
| 2023 | Diablo IV | Mephisto | | |
| 2023 | Starfield | Owen Dexler | | |
| 2023 | Mortal Kombat 1 | Baraka, Markon | | |
| 2023 | Hellboy Web of Wyrd | Lucky | | |
| 2023 | Mortal Kombat: Onslaught | Baraka and Sub-Zero | | |
| 2023 | Like a Dragon Gaiden: The Man Who Erased His Name | Toru Higashi | | |
| 2024 | Contra: Operation Galuga | Bill Rizer | | |
| 2024 | Marvel Rivals | Venom, Wolverine | | |
| 2025 | Like a Dragon: Pirate Yakuza in Hawaii | Toru Higashi | | |
| 2025 | Date Everything! | Abel | | |
| 2025 | Ys vs. Trails in the Sky: Alternative Saga | Galsis | | |
| 2025 | Call of Duty: Black Ops 7 | Tank Dempsey | | |
| 2025 | Marvel Cosmic Invasion | Venom, Beta Ray Bill | | |
| 2026 | Marvel Tōkon: Fighting Souls | Wolverine, The Green Goblin | English dub | |
| 2026 | Warhammer 40,000: Dawn of War IV | Captain Cyrus | | |

== Audio books ==
| Year | Title | Role | Notes |
|---|---|---|---|
| 2015 | Rain of the Ghosts | Callahan, Bear Mitchell | |
| 2024 | Ultra 85 | Captain Quentin Thomas | Ultra 85 by:Sir Robert Bryson Hall II (Logic) |

== Other ==
List of performances in other media
| Year | Title | Role | Notes | Source |
|---|---|---|---|---|
| 2000–08, 2012–present | Toonami | TOM | Programming block on Cartoon Network and later Adult Swim | |
| 2010 | Marvel Super Heroes 4D | Wolverine | Film attraction at Madame Tussauds | Resume |
| 2014 | The Marvel Experience | Wolverine | | |
| 2015 | The Incredible True Story | Quentin Thomas | Studio album by Logic | |
| 2015 | The Intruder II | The Intruder | TIE special for Toonami; voice shared with Sonny Strait | |
| 2016 | Legends of Tomorrow | Chronos | Voice, 6 episodes | |
| 2017 | Everybody | Quentin Thomas | Studio album by Logic | |
| 2018 | YSIV | Quentin Thomas | Studio album by Logic | |
| 2018 | The Angel of Vine | Roy Evans | Voice, Scripted podcast Episode: "Good Night Little Rat" | |
| 2019 | The Mandalorian | Spaceport Operator | Voice, episode: "Chapter 5: The Gunslinger" | |
| 2024 | Ultra 85 | Quentin Thomas | Studio album by Logic | |
