= Teenage Mutant Ninja Turtles: Mutants in Manhattan =

2016 video game

- Developer: PlatinumGames
- Publisher: Activision
- Director: Eiro Shirahama
- Producers: Atsushi Kurooka; Robert Conkey; Robert Cooper
- Designer: Eiro Shirahama
- Programmer: Masanori Kumakiri
- Writer: Tom Waltz
- Composers: Masafumi Takada; Naofumi Harada
- Series: Teenage Mutant Ninja Turtles
- Platforms: PlayStation 3; PlayStation 4; Windows; Xbox 360; Xbox One
- Release: WW: May 24, 2016; EU: May 27, 2016
- Genre: Hack and slash
- Modes: Single-player, multiplayer

Teenage Mutant Ninja Turtles: Mutants in Manhattan (Note: Japanese: ティーンエイジ・ミュータント・ニンジャ・タートルズ：ミュータント・イン・マンハッタン, Hepburn: Tīn'eiji Myūtanto Ninja Tātoruzu: Myūtanto in Manhattan) is a 2016 hack and slash game developed by PlatinumGames and published by Activision. Set in its own distinct continuity inspired by various iterations of the Teenage Mutant Ninja Turtles franchise, the main story sees the Turtles face a citywide assault led by the Foot Clan, battling foes like Bebop, Rocksteady, and Slash across New York. As threats escalate, the Turtles must stop General Krang’s invasion and defeat Shredder in a final showdown to save the city.

Mutants in Manhattan is a third-person hack and slash game where players control the four Turtles, each with unique ninjutsu styles and customizable special abilities. Players can switch between turtles at any time, chain combos, use parkour, and collect Battle Points to upgrade skills or buy items from Master Splinter. The game features nine stages with boss battles, random enemy encounters, and support for four-player online co-op. Downed turtles can be revived by teammates or must complete a pizza mini-game if sent back to the lair.

PlatinumGames developed Mutants in Manhattan as their third licensed title with Activision, following The Legend of Korra and Transformers: Devastation. The game was based on Platinum’s own take on the Turtles rather than adapting a specific version. The team revisited older shows and games for reference, with Tom Waltz from the IDW Publishing comic book series as lead writer. The art style was inspired by comic artist Mateus Santolouco.

Mutants in Manhattan was released for PlayStation 3, PlayStation 4, Windows, Xbox 360, and Xbox One in May 2016. It received mixed reviews from critics who criticized the level design, missions, and lack of local co-op. Less than eight months after its release, the game was removed from sale from all digital storefronts on January 3, 2017.

== Gameplay ==
The game is an action hack and slash game with cel-shaded artstyle, in which players control the title characters, including Leonardo, Donatello, Michelangelo and Raphael, from a third-person perspective. With the exception of infinite shurikens, each turtle has an individual style of ninjutsu. Each turtle also has four ultimate abilities, which are interchangeable and shared from a well-sized list. For example, Leonardo can slow down time, and Michelangelo can perform cheerleading, which resets the cooldowns of other turtles' abilities. Players can shift between turtles at will in the single-player campaign. The turtles can perform successive attacks to create a combo. The four turtles also have the ability to parkour and use parachutes while traveling around the game's world. Players encounter numerous green orbs in the game. These orbs, known as Battle Points can be spent to upgrade the turtles' abilities - as well as buying items (such as grappling hooks and rocket launchers) from Master Splinter anytime during the game. April O' Neil provides assistance to players by giving hints and directions. The turtles can also scan their surroundings and tag enemies.

The game is divided into nine different stages. In each stage, players encounter random enemies before reaching a boss. When the player character is defeated, other turtles (controlled by artificial intelligence in the campaign or by other players in the multiplayer) can help revive the players. If the turtles are not revived, they will be sent back to the subterranean lair. A mini-game will then begin, tasking the turtle to eat pizza as fast as possible. The game supports four-player online cooperative multiplayer.

== Plot ==
The Teenage Ninja Turtles—consisting of Leonardo, Donatello, Raphael and Michelangelo—find the Foot Clan causing trouble in New York City once again. After the streets are cleared, the turtles are told by April via T-Glass that Bebop is robbing a bank and is well-armed with chainsaws, explosive bombs and guns. Working together, the turtles defeat Bebop, before learning that his partner Rocksteady is also causing trouble, threatening to destroy the subway system with time bombs. Upon defeating the hammer-swinging Rocksteady, the four turtle brothers are again contacted by April, who reveals that Slash is hiding deep in the sewers, so the turtles investigate, while watching out for Slash, who is constantly taunting them. The turtles are directed to a construction site high up in the skyscrapers, where Karai has placed explosives, which they defuse before fighting Karai, who then escapes via jet-pack.

The turtles next face off against Armaggon, before also encountering Wingnut, whom they soon defeat. Afterwards, General Krang, not impressed by the turtles defeating his minions, attacks New York himself, but is also ultimately defeated, though the turtles celebrate too early, as Krang then upgrades himself and becomes "Mega Krang." The turtles once again triumph over Krang, before being attacked by Shredder himself, who is annoyed with everyone else's failure to destroy them and attempts to do it himself. Shredder proves to be their biggest challenge yet, but through teamwork and their experience, the turtles prevail, saving New York from the Foot Clan once again.

== Development and release ==
According to developer PlatinumGames, the team developed licensed video games as creating new intellectual properties was difficult. Mutants in Manhattan is the third licensed game developed by Platinum, after the company partnered with Activision to create The Legend of Korra (2014) and Transformers: Devastation (2015). According to Platinum, they developed the game based on their own vision instead of the previous comics, films or games. According to game designer Eiro Shirahama, the team watched the Turtles animated series' and also played the old Turtles games for the Super Famicom while working on the game so as to understand the universe and the characters. Tom Waltz, who had previously written Turtles comic books for IDW Publishing, is the game's lead writer. The game's artstyle was inspired by Mateus Santolouco, an artist of the series.

The game's existence was first leaked by Xbox.com, Australian Classification Board and a user on Twitter. PlatinumGames later officially announced the title on January 26, 2016. Teenage Mutant Ninja Turtles: Mutants in Manhattan was released for PlayStation 3, PlayStation 4, Windows, Xbox 360, and Xbox One in May 2016. Less than eight months after its release, the game was removed from sale from all digital storefronts on January 3, 2017.

== Reception ==
Reception

Aggregate score
Aggregator	Score
Metacritic	(XONE) 55/100 (PC) 51/100 (PS4) 44/100

Review scores
Publication	Score
Destructoid	4.5/10
Edge	3/10
Game Informer	6/10
GameSpot	4/10
Hardcore Gamer	2/5
IGN	4.9/10

Teenage Mutant Ninja Turtles: Mutants in Manhattan received "mixed or average" reviews on the Xbox One and PC, and received "generally unfavorable" reviews on the PlayStation 4, according to video game review aggregator website Metacritic.

Brett Makedonski of Destructoid said of the Xbox One version, "it doesn't even necessarily succeed where Platinum Games usually excels." Dave Rudden of IGN called the PlayStation 4 version short, bland, and highly repetitive, while also expressing criticism at the lack of local co-op multiplayer. Digital Foundry's John Linneman criticized the game for not reaching 60 frames per second on any platform, even though an Activision producer stated that local co-op multiplayer was omitted to reach it. Game Informer said of the PlayStation 4 version, "Controlling the turtles is fun, but the structure of the levels, missions, and bosses leave much to be desired" Hardcore Gamer said of the same console version, "About the only real way one can recommend Mutants in Manhattan is if you're a really die-hard Ninja Turtles fan and [you] have access to online multiplayer, and even then, the tedious level and mission design is sure to get grating after a while. In the end, sadly, not even an old-fashioned Ninja Rap could save this mess." GameSpot said of the same console version, "Without a doubt, Mutants In Manhattan is a disappointment, one multiplied several times over not just by its pedigree, but by the fact that the ingredients for a good game are present." Edge gave the same console version three out of ten, saying, "Platinum needs to take a little more care when it comes to picking its battles".
