= Marika Hayashi =

Japanese actress

- 林 真里花
- Born: 17 April 1975 (age 51); Kanagawa Prefecture, Japan
- Occupations: Actress; voice actress
- Years active: 1998–present
- Father: Ryuzo Hayashi

Marika Hayashi (林 真里花, Hayashi Marika; born 17 April 1975) is a Japanese actress and voice actress.

== Filmography ==
=== Anime television series ===
- Overman King Gainer (xxxx) (Adette Kistler)
- Kino's Journey (xxxx) (Miss Rose)
- Tatakau Shisho (xxxx) (Panyi)
- Darker than Black: Ryūsei no Gemini (xxxx) (Michiru)
- Naruto Shippuden (2011) (Former Leader of Nadeshiko Village)
- Cobra (2010) (Midora)
- Star Twinkle PreCure (2019) (Capricorn's Star Princess)
- Blade of the Immortal -Immortal- (2019) (Hyakurin)

=== Theatrical animation ===
- Naruto the Movie 3: Guardians of the Crescent Moon Kingdom (2006) (Amayo)

=== Video games ===
- The Wonderful 101 (2013) (Vijounne)
- Need for Speed Payback (2017) (Lina Navarro)
- Resident Evil 2 (2019) (Annette Birkin)
- Resident Evil 3 (2020) (Annette Birkin)

=== Dubbing roles ===
==== Live-action ====
- Kate Winslet
  - Eternal Sunshine of the Spotless Mind (Clementine Kruczynski)
  - The Holiday (Iris Simpkins)
  - Revolutionary Road (April Wheeler)
  - Contagion (Dr. Erin Mears)
  - A Little Chaos (Sabine De Barra)
  - Steve Jobs (Joanna Hoffman)
  - Black Beauty (Black Beauty)
- 2012 (Kate Curtis (Amanda Peet))
- 24 (Chloe O'Brian (Mary Lynn Rajskub))
- Absentia (Emily Byrne (Stana Katic))
- Agatha Christie's Poirot (Rosamund (Fiona Glascott))
- Agents of S.H.I.E.L.D. (Barbara "Bobbi" Morse (Adrianne Palicki))
- All or Nothing (Rachel)
- Another Earth (Rhoda Williams (Brit Marling))
- Assassin's Creed (Dr. Sofia Rikkin (Marion Cotillard))
- Bad Lieutenant: Port of Call New Orleans (Frankie Donnenfeld (Eva Mendes))
- Battlestar Galactica (Sharon Valerii "Boomer" Ensign (Grace Park))
- Before the Devil Knows You're Dead (Gina Hanson (Marisa Tomei))
- Black Panther: Wakanda Forever (Dr. Graham (Lake Bell))
- Blindspot (Natasha Zapata (Audrey Esparza))
- Bones (Joy Deaver (Alicia Coppola) & Helen)
- Che (Tamara Bunke (Franka Potente))
- Chicago Joe and the Showgirl (2009 DVD edition) (Betty Jones (Emily Lloyd))
- Chocolate (Zin)
- The Chorus (Violette Morhange (Marie Bunel))
- Clash of the Titans (Princess Andromeda (Alexa Davalos))
- Criminal Minds (Jordan Todd (Meta Golding) and Kate Callahan (Jennifer Love Hewitt))
- Dawn of the Dead (2010 DVD edition) (Francine "Flygirl" Parker (Gaylen Ross))
- Deadpool (Vanessa (Morena Baccarin)
- Deadpool 2 (Vanessa (Morena Baccarin))
- Deadpool & Wolverine (Vanessa (Morena Baccarin))
- The Devil's Double (Sarrab (Ludivine Sagnier))
- Enchanted (Nancy Tremaine (Idina Menzel))
- End of Days (2001 TV Asahi edition) (Christine York (Robin Tunney))
- ER (Hope (Busy Philipps))
- Eragon (Saphira (Rachel Weisz))
- Farewell, My Queen (Marie Antoinette (Diane Kruger))
- Fast & Furious (2011 TV Asahi edition) (Sophie Trinh (Liza Lapira))
- Final Destination 3 (Wendy Christensen (Mary Elizabeth Winstead))
- Firewall (2009 TV Asahi edition) (Janet Stone (Mary Lynn Rajskub))
- FlashForward (Olivia Benford (Sonya Walger))
- Flying Swords of Dragon Gate (Gu Shaotang (Li Yuchun))
- From Russia with Love (Tatiana Romanova (Daniela Bianchi))
- Get Smart (Agent 99 (Anne Hathaway))
- Gold (Kay (Bryce Dallas Howard))
- Gossip Girl (Juliet Sharp (Katie Cassidy))
- The Green Hornet (Lenore Case (Cameron Diaz))
- Greenland (Allison Garrity (Morena Baccarin))
- Grey's Anatomy (Violet Turner (Amy Brenneman))
- Hercules (Atalanta (Ingrid Bolsø Berdal))
- He's Just Not That Into You (Janine Gunders (Jennifer Connelly))
- His Dark Materials (Serafina Pekkala (Ruta Gedmintas))
- Homefront (Cassie Bodine Klum (Kate Bosworth))
- The Hospital (Ju Hoiin)
- Hostiles (Rosalee Quaid (Rosamund Pike))
- I Come with the Rain (Lili (Trần Nữ Yên Khê))
- I Hate Suzie (Naomi Jones (Leila Farzad))
- Igby Goes Down (Sookie Sapperstein (Claire Danes))
- Jack Reacher (Helen Rodin (Rosamund Pike))
- John Carter (Dejah Thoris (Lynn Collins))
- Kiss of Death (Jude Whiley (Lenora Crichlow))
- The Last King of Scotland (Kay Amin (Kerry Washington))
- The Last Stand (Deputy Sarah Torrance (Jaimie Alexander))
- The Martian (Melissa Lewis (Jessica Chastain))
- Merlin (Gwen (Angel Coulby))
- Mother's Day (Jesse (Kate Hudson))
- Mr. Mercedes (Cora Babineau (Tessa Ferrer))
- My Lovely Sam Soon (Kim Sam-soon (Kim Sun-a))
- Obsessed (Sharon Charles (Beyoncé Knowles))
- The Pacific (Sgt Lena Mae Riggi Basilone (Annie Parisse))
- Pepper Dennis (Kimmy Kim (Lindsay Price))
- Perfect Sense (Susan (Eva Green))
- Private Practice (Violet Turner (Amy Brenneman))
- Proof (Catherine Llewellyn (Gwyneth Paltrow))
- The Punisher (Livia Saint (Laura Harring))
- Resident Evil: Extinction (2010 TV Asahi edition) (Claire Redfield (Ali Larter))
- Sabotage (Lizzy Murray (Mireille Enos))
- The Secret Life of Bees (May Boatwright (Sophie Okonedo))
- Sense8 (Lila Facchini (Valeria Bilello))
- Sisters (Kate Ellis (Tina Fey))
- Snow White and the Huntsman (Queen Eleanor (Liberty Ross))
- So Little Time (Tedi (Natashia Williams))
- Speed Racer (Horuko Togokahn (Yu Nan))
- The Strangers (Kristen McKay (Liv Tyler))
- Terminator 3: Rise of the Machines (Kate Brewster (Claire Danes))
- Terminator Salvation (Kate Connor (Bryce Dallas Howard))
- Terminator: The Sarah Connor Chronicles (Riley Dawson (Leven Rambin))
- Transformers (Maggie Madsen (Rachael Taylor))
- Transformers: Age of Extinction (Darcy Tyril (Sophia Myles))
- Ugly Betty (Sofia Reyes (Salma Hayek))
- Wander (Elsa Viceroy (Katheryn Winnick))
- The West Wing (Joey Lucas (Marlee Matlin))
- What to Expect When You're Expecting (Jules Baxter (Cameron Diaz))
- Wind Chill (Girl (Emily Blunt))
- Winter Sonata (2004) (Oh Chae-rin (Park Sol-mi))
- The World's End (Sam Chamberlain (Rosamund Pike))
- Wrath of the Titans (Andromeda (Rosamund Pike))

==== Animation ====
- Onward (Dewdrop)
- Open Season 3 (Ursa)
- Sinbad: Legend of the Seven Seas (Lady Marina)
- Monster Hunter: Legends of the Guild (Nadia)
- Secret Level (The Gamemaster)
