= PlatinumGames =

Japanese video game company

PlatinumGames Inc.

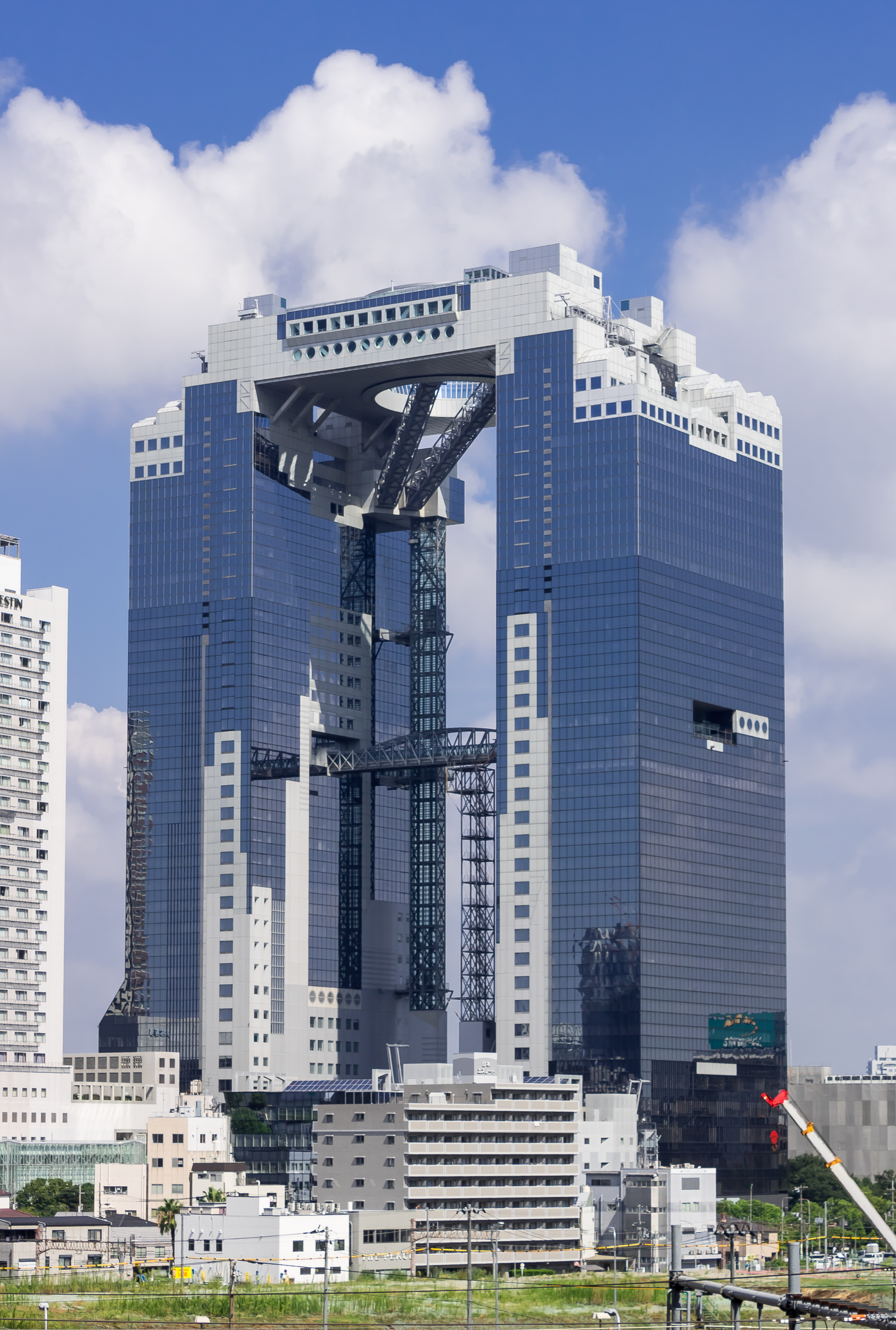
- Headquarters in Kita-ku, Osaka
- Native name: プラチナゲームズ株式会社
- Romanized name: Purachina Gēmuzu Kabushiki Gaisha
- Type: Private
- Industry: Video games
- Predecessors: Seeds Inc.; Odd Inc.
- Founded: October 1, 2007; 19 years ago
- Founders: Shinji Mikami; Atsushi Inaba; Hideki Kamiya; Tatsuya Minami
- Headquarters: Oyodo, Kita-ku, Osaka, Japan
- Number of locations: 3 (2022)
- Key people: Atsushi Inaba (President & CEO); Takao Yamane (Vice president & CBO)
- Products: Bayonetta; Nier: Automata; Vanquish; The Wonderful 101
- Number of employees: 250 (2026)
- Divisions: PlatinumGames Fukuoka; PlatinumGames Tokyo
- Website: platinumgames.com

PlatinumGames Inc. is a Japanese video game developer based in Osaka. It was founded in October 2007 as result of a merger between Seeds Inc. and Odd Inc. Capcom alumni Shinji Mikami, Atsushi Inaba, and Hideki Kamiya founded Seeds Inc. after the closure of Clover Studio, while Odd Inc. was founded by Tatsuya Minami. A year after the studio was founded, video game publisher Sega announced that it would be publishing four intellectual properties developed by the company: MadWorld, Infinite Space, Bayonetta, and Vanquish. Their partnership later extended to include Anarchy Reigns. Most of these games were met with positive reception. Over the years, PlatinumGames had developed an expertise in action games and one of its key philosophies was that the team would not follow conventional game design concepts.

While PlatinumGames' core goal was to create new and original intellectual property, the team previously accepted several contract works from Activision on several licensed projects, most of which received mixed reviews. Since 2013, PlatinumGames began collaborating with Nintendo, who funded several of its original titles, including The Wonderful 101 and Astral Chain, and handled licensing between Sega that would allow PlatinumGames to continue the Bayonetta series. The studio worked on creating new installments in other studios' franchises, with the studio taking primary development duties on Metal Gear Rising: Revengeance for Konami, Star Fox Zero for Nintendo, Nier: Automata for Square Enix, and Ninja Gaiden 4 for Koei Tecmo and Xbox Game Studios.

== History ==
=== 2006–2007: Founding ===
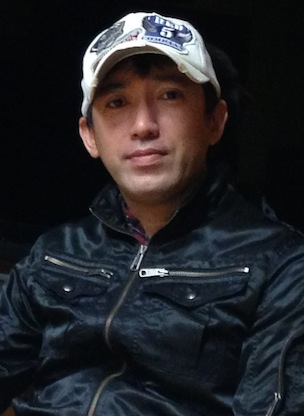
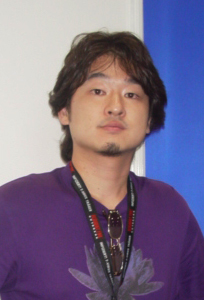
Former Capcom employees Shinji Mikami (left) and Atsushi Inaba (right) co-founded the company along with Hideki Kamiya and Tatsuya Minami.

PlatinumGames was founded by the merger of Seeds Inc. and Odd Inc. in October 2007. Seeds Inc. had been founded by Shinji Mikami, Atsushi Inaba, and Hideki Kamiya on August 1, 2006. Prior to establishing the company, the three worked for Capcom, and were key members of the Osaka-based Clover Studio, which specialized in making new and creative intellectual properties. They worked closely together developing popular Capcom franchises, including Resident Evil, Devil May Cry, Viewtiful Joe, and Ōkami. Most of these games received critical acclaim, but under-performed commercially, leading to Capcom's decision to close the studio. Prior to the closure, the three founders had already left the studio to form their own company in mid-2006. In January 2006, the company expanded to 51 employees, including more former Capcom employees such as Masami Ueda, composer for the early Resident Evil games, and Mari Shimazaki, Ōkami's artist. Yusuke Hashimoto and Kenji Saito, who would eventually become PlatinumGames' directors, joined during its establishment period. The new company revealed its existence by launching its website in February 2007.

Odd Ltd. was founded by Tatsuya Minami in February 2006, and later renamed Odd Inc. in July 2007. Like the founders of Clover Studio, Minami worked at Capcom prior to founding his own studio. He joined Capcom and for twenty years was involved in titles such as Super Ghouls 'n Ghosts and the Mega Man franchise. However, he decided to leave as he became tired of making sequels. Minami became the studio's head and focused on the company's management and administration, while Mikami, Inaba, and Kamiya remained in the positions of director or producer.

=== 2008–2012: Partnership with Sega ===
The company had not revealed anything about upcoming games for a year, until 2008, when Sega announced that it would be publishing four PlatinumGames' titles. According to Minami, the titles were unique and creative, and it was courageous of Sega to publish these risky titles. Minami added further that the partnership with Sega allowed them to bring these titles to Western markets. The four games included MadWorld, Infinite Space, Bayonetta, and Vanquish. Each was released in 2009. All the intellectual properties created by PlatinumGames as part of the partnership are owned by Sega.

MadWorld was the first game to be released. Produced by Inaba, the game was designed to appeal to a western audience and had a unique art style inspired by that of Sin City. The original story was written by Yasumi Matsuno, who had previously worked on Square Enix's Ogre Battle and Final Fantasy Tactics, while PlatinumGames and Sega jointly localized the title for the West. The team created the game with a vision of bringing a unique game to the Wii. While the game received positive reviews, it was a commercial failure, despite Sega's heavy marketing. Though the game was a commercial failure, Sega felt that sales were "encouraging", and said that it would continue to make mature games for the Wii. They released the Welcome To Violence pack, which bundles MadWorld with House of the Dead: Overkill, and The Conduit, each of which were commercial failures. In 2010, Sega announced that it would cease publishing mature video games for the Wii, citing the disappointing sales of MadWorld as a contributing factor. However, PlatinumGames announced several days later that it would like to make the sequel game.

The company's second game was Infinite Space. Announced as Infinite Line, it is a role-playing video game with real-time strategy, and space simulation elements. Inspired by the works of Arthur C. Clarke and Greg Egan, PlatinumGames collaborated closely with Nude Maker for the game. Produced by Inaba, it was released in June 2009 in Japan, and its localized release for western territories was in March 2010. The game was a moderate success in Japan, but sales of the game in the West were unsatisfactory. PlatinumGames blamed Sega for not producing enough copies of the game, as the game "sold out instantly".

"That's how games are. Teams kind of burn themselves out and then they get all that feedback and they get recharged and then people say that they're ready to do it again. And Bayonetta was a really, really strong example of that".

— Atsushi Inaba on Bayonetta's development

The third game is Bayonetta, an action game "evolved" from the Devil May Cry series. The title was directed by Kamiya, who originally pitched several "casual" projects for the studio before starting the development of Bayonetta. The game features an original story, with inspirations drawn from Scandinavian mythology, while the design of the titular character was based on Kamiya's own vision of an "ideal woman". The development team was credited as "Team Little Angels", as opposed to Devil May Cry's "Team Little Devils". The game received critical acclaim on its release, with critics praising its action as "genre-topping", as well as its characters and innovation. However, according to Inaba, the team had set an overly high standard for themselves and became extremely frustrated by the end of the project's development. Inaba added that the game's development "nearly broke" PlatinumGames. The team's morale was restored after hearing players' positive opinions of the game. In addition, Inaba called the PlayStation 3 version of the game the company's "biggest failure", as the team did not have sufficient skills to develop that version of the game. More than 1.35 million units of the game were shipped, but according to Minami, the company was disappointed with its sales, despite it being one of the most commercially successful games produced by the company. An animated film based on the game, called Bayonetta: Bloody Fate, was later released by Gonzo.

The Sega-PlatinumGames original partnership announcement teased a mysterious fourth game from Mikami. The title was later revealed to be Vanquish. The team drew inspiration from Casshern when creating the game's visuals. Mikami decided the game's third-person perspective through trial and error, and hoped that with it, the team could increase its gameplay pace. It was originally designed to be an open world game, but this idea was later abandoned and the game's direction shifted to become linear. On its release, the game was positively reviewed, with critics calling it innovative for introducing new elements into the shooter genre. Sega added that the company was encouraged by the game's first and second-day sales. After its release, Mikami left PlatinumGames and formed a new company, Tango Gameworks. According to Minami, Mikami "always wanted to be his own man, and his own developer".

In late 2010, PlatinumGames revealed that it was in discussions with Sega to extend their partnership. Inaba added that Sega is a publisher which allows the team to have much creative control over their games. In 2011, PlatinumGames announced that it had extended its partnership with a new title called Max Anarchy. The game was released in western territories as Anarchy Reigns in 2012. The game serves as a sequel to MadWorld, but it does not feature the Sin City graphic style, though players assume control of MadWorld's protagonist Jack Cayman for most parts of the game. The game received mixed reviews on its release, and it was a commercial failure. Anarchy Reigns was the final game created by PlatinumGames and Sega.

=== 2013–2016: Licensed properties and exclusive games ===
In 2011, Hideo Kojima and his studio Kojima Productions were working on a new Metal Gear game focused on one of its main characters Raiden, a ninja equipped with swords. Unable to continue working on the game, Kojima contacted Minami to ask PlatinumGames to work on it. According to Kojima, PlatinumGames was the only studio capable of working on an action game with sword-based combat. The team added stealth elements to the game finding its system too boring and straightforward. Directed by Kenji Saito, the game, titled Metal Gear Rising: Revengeance, was released in 2013 and received generally positive reviews from critics, and was a commercial success. It also became the company's first licensed title.

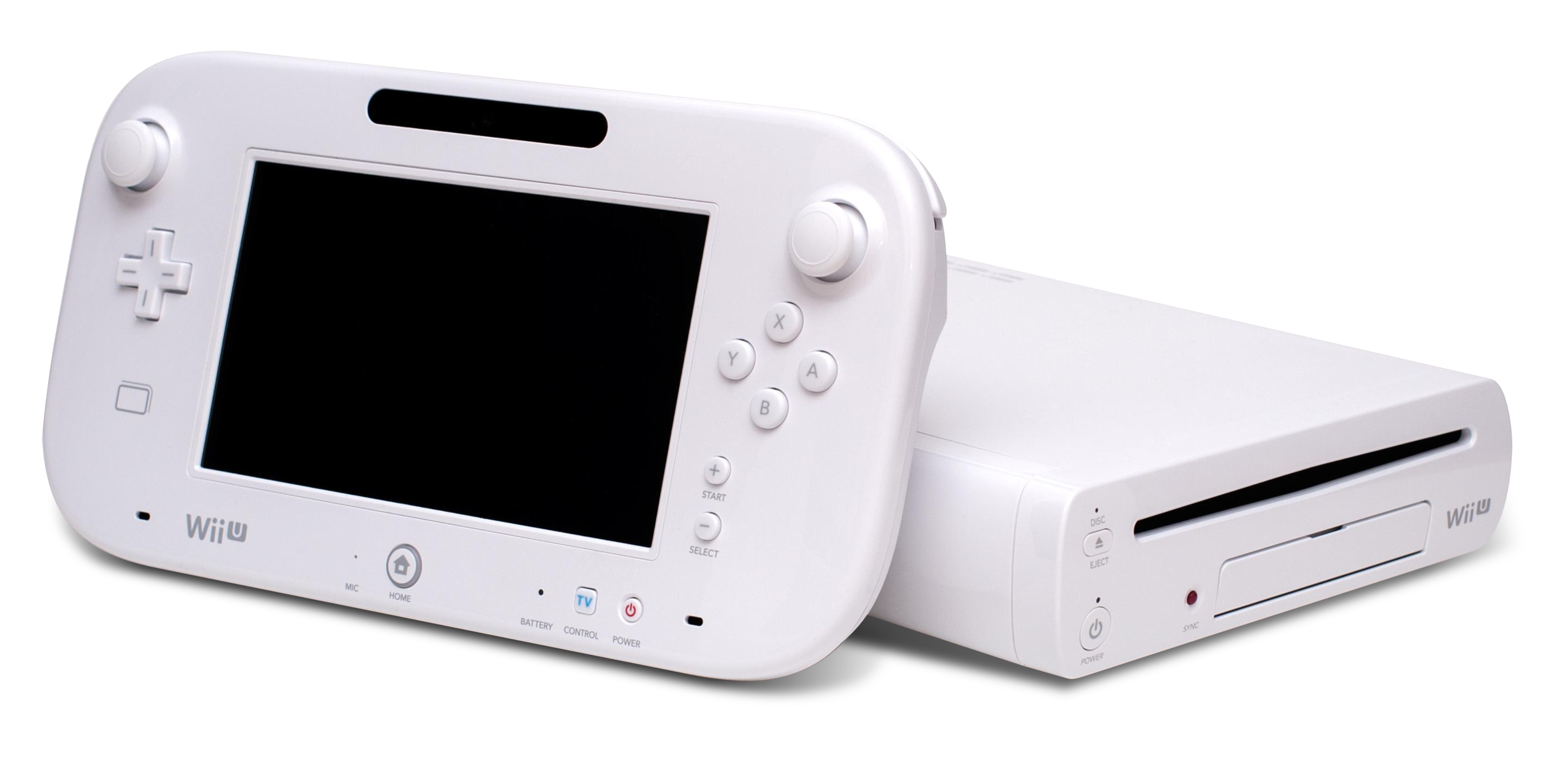
PlatinumGames released two games exclusively for Nintendo's Wii U console within two years.

The same year also saw the release of PlatinumGames' second game, The Wonderful 101 for the Wii U. While Kamiya directed the game, Minami offered creative advice. According to Kamiya, inspiration was drawn from classic tokusatsu series like Super Sentai, and that the game was designed to appeal to all types of audiences. The game was originally planned for the Wii, and was set to feature classic Nintendo characters. However, as the team found that it was difficult to use these characters creatively, the game was put on hold temporarily. Its development was restarted later, with 50 original characters being featured in the final game. Nintendo provided feedback during the game's development hoping that it would reach a larger audience. The game received critical acclaim. It was considered one of the best games in the Wii U library, and was voted one of community's Nintendo favorites. However, the game underperformed in Japan, and was outsold by Pikmin 3, which had already been released before the launch of The Wonderful 101. VG247 attributed the game's failure to the low sales of the Wii U.

Their partnership continued with Bayonetta 2, which sparked controversy for being a Wii U exclusive when its predecessor is a multi-platform title. According to Inaba, the company worked with Sega to create the game's sequel. It was later cancelled in the middle of the game's development until Nintendo offered to work with the company to revive it and fund the project. Sega only served as the game's advisor. Inaba added that Nintendo did not actively interfere with the game's development, and compared its role to that of an observer. Kamiya, who did not direct the sequel game, served as the game's supervisor. Replacing Kamiya as the game's director is Yusuke Hashimoto. Hashimoto focused on refining the original's combat, and extending the game's replay value. Bayonetta 2 received critical acclaim on its launch, with several gaming publications awarding the game a perfect score. Though Nintendo did not comment on the game's sales, the title sold only 38,828 copies in Japan in its first week of release, faring much worse than the original. It became the seventh best-selling retail game in the UK in its first week of release, but sales declined significantly in the second week.

The company gradually developed more and more licensed titles based on existing properties. Their partners grant it creative freedom while creating these games' gameplay. Their second licensed title is The Legend of Korra (2014), based on Nickelodeon's animated series of the same name. Published by Activision, the game's story was written by Tim Hedrick, the show writer. The game received a mixed reception when it was launched. The company later worked on the game Transformers: Devastation, based on Hasbro's Transformers: Generations. Directed by Saito, the game was designed to look and feel different from previous Transformers games. The title received favorable reviews when it was released in 2015. The third licensed title, Teenage Mutant Ninja Turtles: Mutants in Manhattan was released in May 2016. According to game designer Eiro Shirahama, the team watched the TMNT animated series and also played the old TMNT games for the Super Famicom while working on the game so as to understand the universe and the characters. The game garnered mixed reception when it was released.

In 2013, Kamiya revealed that he would like to have an opportunity to continue PlatinumGames' partnership with Nintendo, creating new properties or working on extending the universe of its existing franchises such as Star Fox. Shigeru Miyamoto, who produced Star Fox Zero, expressed his desire to work with external developers so that the project can have a shorter development cycle. The team was asked to serve as the game's co-developer after Nintendo saw the Arwing stage of Bayonetta 2. Zero, along with its spin-off tower defense game Star Fox Guard, was released in April 2016 to mixed reception. By the end of March 2016, Minami stepped down from his position as president and CEO, with executive producer Kenichi Sato replacing him.

In August 2016, PlatinumGames was revealed to be in a collaboration with Cygames in the development of the action role-playing game Granblue Fantasy: Relink, but in February 2019 it was announced that PlatinumGames would no longer be involved in the project, leaving Cygames to handle the rest of development.

Kamiya worked on the Microsoft Studios game Scalebound, but it was cancelled in January 2017. Creative producer Jean-Pierre Kellams left the company, while Kamiya stopped working as a director and served as a vice president.

=== 2017–2021: Nier: Automata and "Platinum 4" ===
The studio collaborated with Square Enix, and released Nier: Automata for PlayStation 4 and Windows in 2017, with an Xbox One version being released in 2018. Directed by Nier creator Yoko Taro, the game received critical acclaim and more than 2 million copies were sold. According to Kamiya, Taro "saved" PlatinumGames after the cancellation of Scalebound. The positive reception of Nier Automata had sparked public interest in Platinum's work once again. In May 2017, Inaba announced the company was working on a new intellectual property. At The Game Awards 2017, Bayonetta 3 was revealed as an exclusive for the Nintendo Switch. It was also announced that Nintendo Switch ports of the first two Bayonetta games would be released in February 2018. At the ceremony, Nier: Automata also won in the Best Score/Music category.

In April 2018, the company announced a partnership with DeNA for an action game that explores Japanese folklore for Android and iOS devices, titled World of Demons. Its development began in 2015 with 30 employees attached to it, including staff who had worked on Star Fox Zero and Bayonetta 2, was soft launched in some countries in 2018, but was pulled from storefronts the following year. Platinum then released World of Demons for Apple Arcade on April 2, 2021. Another game, Astral Chain, was released for the Nintendo Switch on August 30, 2019.

In 2019, Inaba revealed that the studio was working on two new unannounced intellectual properties owned by the studio, one of which he described as "truly unlike anything else."

Tencent Holdings supplied capital investment into Platinum in January 2020, which will allow the studio to self-publish its future titles. Platinum's CEO Kenichi Sato stated that the Tencent investment changed no aspect of Platinum's ownership and it remains an independent developer.

On February 3, 2020, PlatinumGames launched a website titled "Platinum 4", revolving around four announcements, which included:

- The launch of a Kickstarter campaign for a remastered port of The Wonderful 101 on modern platforms. This is PlatinumGames' first self-published title, although it has stated Tencent's investment has no part in its development.
- A new game with the working title Project G.G., described as the final game of Kamiya's self-titled "hero" trilogy following Viewtiful Joe and The Wonderful 101. Kamiya said while Viewtiful Joe was about one man transforming into a hero, and The Wonderful 101 was about a team transforming into heroes, Project G.G. involves a similar concept around a giant hero.
- The opening of PlatinumGames Tokyo, a new studio for about 100 staff to support live service games for the company. Heading the studio include staff that had formerly worked on EA Sports FC Mobile.
- A new game titled Sol Cresta, in collaboration with Hamster Corporation, originally announced as an April Fools' joke in 2020 was then confirmed a year later to be releasing as a digital-only title for Nintendo Switch, PlayStation 4, and Windows in 2021 as the first entry of Platinum's “Neo-Classic Arcade” series.

In addition to these announcements, the research and development side of Platinum had been developing a new in-house game engine named PlatinumEngine to power its new titles. Chief technology officer Wataru Ohmori said that the need for a custom engine over other existing solutions like Unreal or Unity was needed to give it better customization and control over its games, and to improve their performance. He said, "We came to the frightening realization that if we don't make our work more efficient, we're simply not going to be able to keep making the games that we want to make as technology and expectations grow." For example, Bayonetta 3, one of the titles using the engine.

=== 2022–present: Inaba appointed CEO and staff departures ===
On January 13, 2022, former CEO Kenichi Sato stepped down from the position after five years and eight months in the role, with Inaba replacing him.

On November 1, 2022, Platinum announced the opening of a third studio: PlatinumGames FUKUOKA.

On September 25, 2023, Kamiya announced that he would be leaving the studio on October 12. By February 2025, fellow game directors Abebe Tinari, Takahisa Taura, Yusuke Miyata, Kenji Saito, and Masaki Yamanaka had also left the company.

== Philosophy ==
"I'm not really interested in working for a studio that isn't kind of a noisy, loud, clanking machine of people bumping into each other and trying to do their best, so if it's just kind of a machine that's there to make money and there to make games efficiently, it's not something that interests me".

— Atsushi Inaba, co-founder of PlatinumGames

According to Inaba, the core goal of the company is to make new and original intellectual property, and that taking risks is a crucial part of video game development. However, the company also worked on licensed titles later, as the team considered creating original titles "difficult", sometimes too risky, with sales that were unsatisfactory for the team. According to Minami, working on both licensed properties and original games provides the company with stability. Despite having a new focus, PlatinumGames retains its original vision of making games and the team hopes to become one of "the three top game studios in the world". While PlatinumGames is a Japanese development company, the development team also attempts to add elements to its games that will attract a large global audience. Minami says that the company is keen to work with both Japanese and Western publishers.

According to Inaba, the company values the idea of "change", and that "the people who are not looking for constant change are not necessarily welcome in what I think the company should be". According to Minami, PlatinumGames only made games that the development team were passionate about. Inaba described the studio as "loud", as every one on the development team is allowed to express their opinions on their projects and their visions will not be compromised. The studio also invites employees who are not involved in game design, such as artists and programmers, to provide creative input to their projects. Saito added that every game that company developed has a "Platinum taste". While the company developed an expertise in action games, Saito claimed that the studio learned from every project and will apply this knowledge to their new games and genres. The company also hopes to innovate by introducing new elements in both original titles or licensed games. According to PlatinumGames, a good action game should be "passive" and feature a "unique selling point"; replay value that allows players to hone their skills; a strong leading character; and should not follow conventional design philosophy.

== Games developed ==
List of games developed by PlatinumGames
Year	Title	Platform(s)	Publisher	Notes
2009	MadWorld	Wii	Sega	—N/a
2009	Bayonetta	Nintendo Switch, PlayStation 3, PlayStation 4, Wii U, Windows, Xbox 360, Xbox One	Sega	—N/a
2010	Vanquish	PlayStation 3, PlayStation 4, Windows, Xbox 360, Xbox One	Sega	—N/a
2012	Anarchy Reigns	PlayStation 3, Xbox 360	Sega	—N/a
2013	Metal Gear Rising: Revengeance	OS X, PlayStation 3, Shield Android TV, Windows, Xbox 360	Konami	—N/a
2013	The Wonderful 101	Wii U	Nintendo	—N/a
2014	Bayonetta 2	Nintendo Switch, Wii U	Nintendo	—N/a
2014	The Legend of Korra	PlayStation 3, PlayStation 4, Windows, Xbox 360, Xbox One	Activision	—N/a
2015	Transformers: Devastation	PlayStation 3, PlayStation 4, Windows, Xbox 360, Xbox One	Activision	—N/a
2015	8-Bit Bayonetta	Browser, Windows	Sega	Co-developed with Bitbaboon
2016	Star Fox Zero	Wii U	Nintendo	Co-developed with Nintendo EPD
2016	Star Fox Guard	Wii U	Nintendo	Co-developed with Nintendo EPD
2016	Teenage Mutant Ninja Turtles: Mutants in Manhattan	PlayStation 3, PlayStation 4, Windows, Xbox 360, Xbox One	Activision	—N/a
2017	Nier: Automata	PlayStation 4, Windows, Xbox One, Nintendo Switch	Square Enix	—N/a
2019	Astral Chain	Nintendo Switch	Nintendo	—N/a
2020	The Wonderful 101: Remastered	Nintendo Switch, PlayStation 4, Windows	PlatinumGames	—N/a
2021	World of Demons	iOS, macOS	PlatinumGames	—N/a
2022	Sol Cresta	Nintendo Switch, PlayStation 4, Windows	PlatinumGames	—N/a
2022	Babylon's Fall	PlayStation 4, PlayStation 5, Windows	Square Enix	—N/a
2022	Bayonetta 3	Nintendo Switch	Nintendo	—N/a
2023	Bayonetta Origins: Cereza and the Lost Demon	Nintendo Switch	Nintendo	—N/a
2025	Ninja Gaiden 4	PlayStation 5, Windows, Xbox Series X/S	Xbox Game Studios	Co-developed with Team Ninja
TBA	Teenage Mutant Ninja Turtles: The Last Ronin	Windows	Paramount Games Studio	—N/a
TBA	Lost Order	Android, iOS	Cygames	Closed beta tests occurred in August 2017; in the "final stretch" of development as of July 2026

=== Additional work ===
Year	Title	Platform(s)	Publisher	Notes
2009	Infinite Space	Nintendo DS	Sega	Developed by Nude Maker, produced by PlatinumGames
2023	Final Fantasy XVI	PlayStation 5	Square Enix	Additional work
2024	Granblue Fantasy: Relink	PlayStation 4, PlayStation 5, Windows	Cygames	Co-developed from 2016 until February 2019 when development moved fully to Osaka Cygames
2025	Metal Gear Solid Delta: Snake Eater	PlayStation 5, Windows, Xbox Series X/S	Konami	"Guy Savage" minigame
2026	eFootball	Android, iOS, PlayStation 4, PlayStation 5, Windows, Xbox One, Xbox Series X/S	Konami	“Daily Super Play” minigame

=== Cancelled games ===
Title	Publisher	Platform(s)	Notes
Scalebound	Microsoft Studios	Windows, Xbox One	Cancelled in January 2017
Project G.G.	PlatinumGames	N/A	Presumed cancelled by several outlets, following director Hideki Kamiya's departure and Platinum's removal of its game page from the company website
