= The Wonderful 101 =

2013 video game

- North American Wii U box art
- Developer: PlatinumGames
- Publishers: Nintendo (Wii U); PlatinumGames (Remastered)
- Directors: Hideki Kamiya; Takanori Sato (Remastered)
- Producers: Atsushi Inaba; Hitoshi Yamagami; Yuji Nakao (Remastered)
- Designers: Hiroshi Shibata; Noriaki Nagano (Remastered)
- Artists: Yuka Kotaki; Ryo Koizumi
- Writer: Hideki Kamiya
- Composers: Norihiko Hibino; Hiroshi Yamaguchi; Rei Kondoh; Akira Takizawa; Hitomi Kurokawa; Masato Kouda
- Platforms: Wii U; Remastered; Nintendo Switch; PlayStation 4; Windows
- Release: August 23, 2013: Wii U; EU: August 23, 2013; JP/AU: August 24, 2013; NA: September 15, 2013 Remastered; NS, PS4, Windows; NA: May 19, 2020; EU: May 22, 2020; JP: June 11, 2020 Amazon Luna; US: May 6, 2021
- Genres: Action-adventure, hack and slash
- Modes: Single-player, multiplayer

The Wonderful 101 (Note: Japanese: ザ・ワンダフル ワン・オー・ワン, Hepburn: Za Wandafuru Wan Ō Wan) is a 2013 action-adventure game developed by PlatinumGames and published by Nintendo for the Wii U. The game was directed by Hideki Kamiya and produced by Atsushi Inaba. It was released in August 2013 in all major regions except North America, where it was released the following month. The Wonderful 101 received generally positive reviews, but failed to meet sales expectations.

A remastered version for Nintendo Switch, PlayStation 4 and Windows, financed through crowdfunding, was released in May 2020. A version for Amazon Luna was made available in May 2021. The remastered version is PlatinumGames' first self-published title. A free downloadable expansion for the remaster, The Wonderful One: After School Hero, was released in May 2023, with a standalone version released in the following month.

== Gameplay ==
Screenshot of an earlier version of the game depicting a "Unite Morph" ability used to battle an opponent. The heroes have combined to form "Unite Hand", which is shown punching a large enemy called the Diedough-Goo.

In The Wonderful 101, players control a horde of superheroes from an aerial viewpoint and can turn them into various objects called "Unite Morphs". As the levels progress, players must explore each stage to find helpless citizens and recruit them to join their army of heroes. The more heroes gathered, the greater the special morph powers can be. At the cost of depleting their battery meter, players can use "Unite Morph" forms to defeat enemies, solve puzzles, or traverse the environment. The meter can be recharged by performing normal attacks or by picking up batteries dropped by a defeated enemy. Enemies will also drop "O parts", the in-game currency used to buy upgrades, new "Unite Morph" abilities and items. To transform the horde of heroes, the appropriate symbol is drawn on the Wii U GamePad's touchscreen or right analog stick, such as an L for a gun or a squiggly line for a whip. In specified areas, the GamePad (by default) is used to change the view to a traditional, third-person angle and better explore tighter environments, such as those found indoors and inside caves.

The single-player campaign is broken into levels. Each level ends with a grade depending on several factors, such as how long it takes the player to complete the level and how much damage the player took. In addition to a single-player mode, the game has a cooperative mode that supports up to five players, with one person utilizing the Wii U GamePad and the four others each using their own Wii U Pro Controllers.

The downloadable expansion The Wonderful One: After School Hero, features side-scrolling gameplay with only a single playable hero, Luka. The player can use Luka's goggles to fire laser blasts in any direction, and can switch between three different laser types that each have different advantages. The expansion features 12 stages, with unlockable bonus stages and score attack modes, and online leaderboard support.

== Synopsis ==
The Wonderful 101 occurs during the third war in a series of conflicts between Earth and an intergalactic alien armada called the GEATHJERK Federation that has invaded the planet. The only hope for humanity is the Wonderful 100 or Wonderful Ones, a group of superheroes working for the CENTINELS Planetary Secret Service, an organization created by the United Nations.

=== Characters ===
The heroic main characters are Will Wedgewood (Wonder-Red) (Charlie Schlatter / Ryōhei Kimura), a Blossom City elementary school teacher and the leader of the Wonderful Ones, whose father Arthur was killed by the GEATHJERK Laambo (Bob Joles / Yasuhiko Kawazu); Eliot Hooker (Wonder-Blue) (Roger Craig Smith / Daisuke Egawa), a confident but impulsive police detective whose an older brother was killed by the GEATHJERK Vijounne (Paula Tiso / Marika Hayashi); guns expert Jean-Sebastain Renault (Wonder-Green) (Kari Wahlgren / Orine Fukushima); fashion model Mariana Kretzulesco (Wonder-Pink) (Tara Strong / Yuki Uchiyama); Russian soldier Ivan Istochinkov (Wonder-Yellow) (JB Blanc / Hiroyuki Honda); ninja-in-training Momoe Byakkoin (Wonder-White) (Yuri Lowenthal / Yoichi Nishijima); and video game player and genius prodigy Krishna Ramanujan (Wonder-Black) (Kris Zimmerman / Orine Fukushima).

The supporting characters are P-Star, a robot assisting these heroes; Laurence Nelson (Wonder-Captain) (Gideon Emery / Yasuhiro Mamiya), the commander of the Centinels who was previously known as Wonder-Red; Virgin Victory operator Alice MacGregor (Laura Bailey / Tomo Muranaka); and science chief James Shirogane (Fred Tatasciore / Kenichi Ogata). Luka Alan Smithee (Debi Derryberry / Tomoni Yamakawa) is a Blossom City Elementary School student whose scientist mother, Margarita, died working for the CENTINELS and gave her life so that the artificial intelligence, Mother Platinum, could sustain the Earth's defensive shield, named Margarita in her honor. Luka joins the group and becomes Wonder-Goggles at the end of the game. The last member of the Galactic Police Federation is Immorta (Stephanie Lemelin / Miho Shinada); both she and her brother, Prince Vorkken (Quinton Flynn / Sho Sudo), lived on the Roaming Comet of Rhullo until Gimme of GEATHJERK planted a virus in the form of a bio-weapon insect named Vaaiki on Vorkken's body. As a result, Vorkken became the vicious leader of the Guyzoch space pirates alongside his right hand Chewgi (Fred Tatasciore / Kiyoyuki Yanada). The main villain is Jergingha (Steve Blum / Kiyoyuki Yanada), the supreme overlord of the GEATHJERK Federation, who is attempting to destroy Earth (known to the rest of the universe as Chi-Q) to take back the galaxy from humanity.

The expansion The Wonderful One: After School Hero introduces a new character, Sue (Jessica DiCicco / Suzuka Kamitaka), Luka's classmate. The Geathjerk scientist Wanna (Steve Blum / Shinya Hamazoe), who appeared as a boss in the main game, acts as the expansion's primary antagonist.

=== Plot ===
The story opens with a school bus full of children being attacked by alien invaders known as the GEATHJERK. The teacher, Will Wedgewood, transforms into the superhero Wonder-Red and teams up with other superheroes to destroy the aliens with Unite Morph powers. One student, however, Luka, appears disillusioned and expresses his hate for both the heroes and the aliens.

The heroes then meet on their flagship, the Virgin Victory to plan their defenses and offenses against the invaders. The Earth is protected from invasion by a shield known as Margarita, powered by five Super Reactors. The heroes must travel around the world to protect these reactors and destroy the aliens who slip through the shield, along with their leaders. As they travel, they meet up with Professor Shirogane, who explains that once the reactors are safe, they will use an orbiting satellite cannon, the Shirogane Comet, to destroy the remainder of the aliens. Along the way, Wonder-Red struggles to lead his team, particularly Wonder-Blue, whose brother was killed by one of the alien leaders, Vijounne. Blue's desire for revenge causes several problems until Red convinces him to cooperate with the team. Also, Luka stows away on the ship and the heroes are forced to bring him along to keep him safe.

The heroes repeatedly fight the space pirate Prince Vorkken and his first mate Chewgi. Vorkken is searching for the strongest fighters in the galaxy so that he can have the strength to get revenge on the GEATHJERK. Vorkken fights with Unite Morph attacks similar to those of the heroes and serves as a foil to Wonder-Red in their encounters. With the help of Vorkken's sister, Immorta, the heroes defeat him, and Wonder-Red convinces Vorkken that his desire for revenge has turned him evil.

At the climax of the story, Luka betrays the heroes and joins Gimme, first class officer of GEATHJERK, revealing that his pendant is the key that controls the Super Reactors. Luka explains that his mother, CENTINELS scientist Professor Margarita, died working on the shield that protects the Earth and he wants the aliens to destroy the Earth to get revenge for the loss of his mother. After chasing down and defeating Gimme, Wonder-Red reveals that Luka's mother is still alive: she had actually turned herself into the artificial intelligence Mother Platinum, the computer system that controls Earth's defenses. Luka abandons his desire for revenge and Mother Platinum gathers pieces of the destroyed city to create a giant robot named "Platinum Robo". Using the robot, the heroes fight their way to the Shirogane Comet and fire its cannon, destroying the invading fleet. Jergingha, leader of the aliens, does not give up and appears in a planet-sized fortress with an even bigger fleet. Platinum Robo flies to attack the fortress, while Chewgi and Vorkken arrive to help break through its defences.

Upon being confronted, Jergingha reveals the GEATHJERK are actually from 1,500 years in the future where Earth becomes an evil empire called the Greater Galactic Coalition using the technology of the Wonderful Ones and the CENTINELS, which has destroyed the home-worlds of the GEATHJERK leaders. GEATHJERK has come back in time to destroy Earth to prevent the Coalition from ever existing. Jergingha's fortress turns into a giant robot, even bigger than Platinum Robo, but the Wonderful Ones, Immorta, and Vorkken all combine their power and destroy it, saving the world. The Guyzoch leave with Vorkken to help rebuild the worlds they attacked. The Wonderful Ones vow to make sure Earth never becomes an evil empire like Jergingha seemingly predicted. Luka joins the Wonderful 100 to help make up for his mistakes. As a result, the team is renamed the "Wonderful 101".

The epilogue shows Luka (now "Wonder-Goggles") and the other heroes saving a school bus from the aliens, paralleling the game's opening. The story ends with the heroes continuing their fight against the remaining Geathjerk forces.

==== The Wonderful One: After School Hero ====
Set shortly before the game's epilogue, Luka begins his Centinels training using a VR simulation program managed by P-Star. As his training continues, strange glitches begin to occur, and P-Star loses control of the simulation, trapping Luka inside. As he battles his way forward, Luka briefly spots his classmate Sue inside the simulation. Worried for her safety, he has P-Star dispatch Centinels security to her home. P-Star manages to extract Luka from the simulation, but Sue is found unconscious. Luka and P-Star discover that the Geathjerk Wanna survived his battle with the Wonderful 100, converting himself into a computer virus, and infiltrated the Centinels computer network using Luka's lost ID card, with Sue's consciousness getting pulled in as well due to her briefly handling the card when returning it.

With Wanna quickly gaining control of the system, Luka demands to be sent back in to stop Wanna and rescue Sue. P-Star agrees, but gives him only 15 minutes, after which the network will be shut down and they will be permanently trapped to prevent Wanna from gaining control of every computer on Earth. Luka hurries through the simulation, defeats Wanna's new virus form, and escapes with Sue just before time runs out. The next day at school, Sue believes her experience to be a dream, but begins to suspect Luka of being the hero that rescued her. At his final training session, P-Star commends Luka, stating he will likely be accepted into the Centinels official ranks. Inspired by something Sue told him, Luka officially dubs himself "Wonder-Goggles".

== Development ==
The development of what would become The Wonderful 101 began during the lifetime of the Wii. The original idea came from PlatinumGames' president, Tatsuya Minami, who wanted to bring a group of popular or iconic video game characters together in one game. Because different gamers would prefer certain characters over others, the idea of being forced to play as a certain character at various points in the game was scrapped. Instead, all of the characters would be on-screen at once so the player could choose between them at any time. PlatinumGames initially thought of using Nintendo first-party characters, who would work together to get past obstacles, but when the idea was presented to Nintendo, they questioned how the mechanic would fill an entire game. Director Hideki Kamiya also doubted that the "conflicting elements" of the different Nintendo characters could be successfully "put into a consistent formula" like in the Super Smash Bros. series. Further brainstorming was put on hold while he worked on another game, but when progress on that game was halted a year later, work on The Wonderful 101 resumed. Kamiya decided to use the Japanese henshin / transforming theme, with a group of five original heroes who could unite and transform into various weapons. Soon the group expanded to one hundred heroes and the Japanese superhero style changed to "an American comic book vibe".

The game's design document was released by Platinum after stretch goals in the Kickstarter campaign for the remaster were met.

Although the developers had been thinking of making the game for the Wii, when PlatinumGames and Nintendo finalized their partnership, it became Wii U-exclusive. The developers wanted to use the console's unique features effectively, so they came up with drawing on the GamePad as a way to activate the "Unite Morphs".

=== Music ===
The music is an orchestrated score, written by Hiroshi Yamaguchi, Akira Takizawa, Hitomi Kurokawa, Norihiko Hibino, Masato Kouda, and Rei Kondoh. The theme songs are called "The Won-Stoppable Wonderful 100" and "The Won-Stoppable Wonderful 101". They are sung by Foresta in the Japanese version and by Jimmy Wilcox, Rob McElroy, and Bruce Blanchard in the English version. A two-volume, official soundtrack was released in September 2014. For Remastered, Yoko Shimomura, Keiichi Okabe, and Yuzo Koshiro provided several arrangements.

=== Marketing ===
The Wonderful 101 was revealed at E3 2012 on the conference floor, codenamed Project P-100. On July 3, 2013, Nintendo introduced their "Wonderful Wednesday" social networking campaign to promote The Wonderful 101, where on each Wednesday leading up to the game's launch, they release a new character portrait. Two days later, however, Kamiya posted on Twitter that he was worried about the lack of marketing for The Wonderful 101. He was referring to the lack of information in magazines or websites, and claimed that the game took almost 1.5 times the resources and manpower as Platinum's biggest game, Bayonetta. The Wonderful 101 was revealed at Nintendo Direct presentation in the following month.

=== Remastered ===
In a May 2018 interview, Kamiya stated that the team had some ideas for a possible port on the Nintendo Switch, as he made internal documents on how they would do it. Platinum launched a Kickstarter in February 2020 to port the game in a remastered edition to the Switch and other platforms including PlayStation 4 and Windows when stretch goals were met, with further stretch goals to add DLC to the game. Hideki Kamiya and Atsushi Inaba said that they had approached Nintendo, the publisher and co-owner of copyright and sole owner of the trademark, about republishing the game for a wider audience. Nintendo only wanted to publish a new game if it was going to be exclusive to Nintendo Switch, while Platinum wanted the remaster to be on more platforms. Nintendo allowed them to do it, though they would not publish the remaster. This gave Platinum the opportunity to try self-publishing. With the game nearly in a complete state for these new ports, they opted to use Kickstarter not only to judge how popular the game was, and thus mitigate the Kickstarter's stretch goals based on this, but also that there was still a necessary business element to self-publishing that the Kickstarter funds would help cover and deal with risks involved with publishing. Studio executive director Atsushi Inaba affirmed the Kickstarter was not about money for development but as a means to bring the community together and to make sure what additional content they could bring to the base game. Among other cosmetic updates, Platinum had devised a way to take the two-screen approach that had been used on the Wii U version (including the picture-in-picture) into a version that will work on the single-screen platforms. Drawing features are still incorporated in the Switch version.

Within hours, the campaign had surpassed its goals for all three versions. The campaign concluded with over US$2.25 million raised, achieving several of the stretch goals that included a separate 2D side-scrolling game based on the adventures of Luka. A celebratory Twitch stream held by PlatinumGames at the Kickstarter's conclusion brought in additional donations that allowed a last stretch goal, orchestral arrangements of two of the game's songs, to be made as well. Remastered was released digitally in North America on May 19, 2020, in Europe on May 22, and in Japan on June 11. Additional DLC for Remastered has been released in 2021, including a free time attack mode released on June 15, and "The Prince Vorkken" DLC on August 28, which allows players to control Prince Vorkken as the main character and temporarily summon enemies using "Enemy Morphs" in place of the usual "Unite Morph" abilities. A free side-scrolling DLC, The Wonderful One: After School Hero, was split into two parts, with Part 1 releasing on May 19, 2023, and Part 2 releasing a week later on May 26. A standalone version of the DLC was released one month later on June 21.

While the game was successful in its funding goals, it is noted that there were some issues regarding the delivery of additional rewards to backers, such as art books, custom controllers and more. Furthermore, the delivery of the physical edition was postponed for a while and the codes for the Switch version were delivered with irregularities.

== Reception ==
The Wonderful 101 (and Remastered)

Aggregate score
Aggregator	Score			
Aggregator	NS	PC	PS4	Wii U
Metacritic	72/100	85/100	76/100	78/100

Review scores
Publication	Score			
Publication	NS	PC	PS4	Wii U
4Players	80/100	N/A	80/100	85/100
Destructoid	N/A	N/A	8/10	9/10
Electronic Gaming Monthly	N/A	N/A	N/A	7/10
Eurogamer	Recommended	N/A	N/A	8/10
Famitsu	N/A	N/A	N/A	39/40
Game Informer	N/A	N/A	N/A	7.5/10
GameSpot	4/10	N/A	N/A	8/10
GamesRadar+	N/A	N/A	N/A	3/5
GamesTM	N/A	N/A	N/A	8/10
GameTrailers	N/A	N/A	N/A	8.8/10
Hardcore Gamer	3.5/5	N/A	N/A	3.5/5
Hyper	N/A	N/A	N/A	70/100
IGN	9/10	9/10	N/A	7.4/10
Jeuxvideo.com	15/20	15/20	15/20	N/A
Joystiq	N/A	N/A	N/A	4/5
Nintendo Life	8/10	N/A	N/A	9/10
Nintendo World Report	6/10	N/A	N/A	9/10
Official Nintendo Magazine	N/A	N/A	N/A	93%
Polygon	N/A	N/A	N/A	6/10
Shacknews	N/A	N/A	N/A	7/10
The Guardian	N/A	N/A	N/A	4/5
USgamer	3/5	N/A	N/A	4/5
VentureBeat	N/A	N/A	N/A	69/100
VideoGamer.com	N/A	N/A	N/A	8/10

The Wonderful 101 received generally positive reviews from critics. It has an aggregate score of 78/100 on Metacritic. The game was praised for its innovative gameplay and the depth of its combat system, but its hard learning curve received a mixed response, with some criticizing it and others such as Nintendo Enthusiast's Michael Nelson praising the game for requiring a certain amount of skill.

Most reviewers enjoyed the ridiculously nonsensical story, characters, and humor, but some found the few sexual jokes in the game to be out-of-place in what was perceived as a kid-friendly game (although it has a Teen rating). The Wonderful 101's length and pacing seemed a bit drawn-out to some reviewers due to repetitive enemies and boss fights, while others thought these issues were unproblematic thanks to the even distribution of new moves and upgrades.

The necessity of forming weapons by drawing on the touchscreen garnered a mixed reception. Many reviewers found that the GamePad worked fine for straight lines or circles (to make a sword or a fist), but that it sometimes interpreted more complex shapes as the wrong weapon. Others thought that drawing simple shapes on the GamePad while using the right analogue stick for others was more reliable, or that the GamePad worked perfectly and it was simply a matter of practice. The camera was criticized for being too zoomed-out to keep track of all of the characters during battle but also too zoomed-in to see the occasional out-of-view enemy. Reviewers agreed that the game lived up to PlatinumGames' trademark high difficulty, with some citing the controls and camera as contributing factors.

Nearly all critics were pleased with the creative uses of the GamePad's second screen, but a few thought that navigating inside of a building using the controller's gyroscope was clunky. Many also thought the multiplayer mode was enjoyable, but often lost track of their own group of characters. Most agreed that it felt "tacked on". The Wonderful 101's cartoony art style and flashy effects in battle were also praised. The set-pieces and giant bosses were likewise well-received, as were the voice acting and soundtrack.

=== Sales ===
Nintendo shipped 30,000 copies for the game's launch in Japan. The game sold 5,258 physical copies in its first week in Japan, where it went on to sell 27,028 physical units. The game reached 22nd place in its first week on the UK sales chart. In the United States, The Wonderful 101 sold 49,000 units by the end of 2013, bringing the game's total known sales to 79,000 units in Japan and the United States.

== Legacy ==
Both Atsushi Inaba and Hideki Kamiya have expressed interest in a sequel. In September 2024, it was confirmed that PlatinumGames had fully acquired the Wonderful 101 trademark from Nintendo.

The seven main protagonists appeared as Trophies in Super Smash Bros. for Wii U, and Wonder-Red and Wonder-Blue appeared as Spirits in Super Smash Bros. Ultimate.
