= Transformers: Devastation =

2015 video game

- Developer: PlatinumGames
- Publisher: Activision
- Director: Kenji Saito
- Producers: Atsushi Kurooka; Akiko Kuroda; Robert Conkey
- Designers: Hiroshi Shibata; Yuto Abe; Mari Fujita
- Programmer: Kazunori Morita
- Writer: Andy Schmidt
- Composers: Satoshi Igarashi; Tetsuya Shibata; Jun Okubo; Vince DiCola; Kenny Meriedeth
- Series: Transformers
- Platforms: PlayStation 3; PlayStation 4; Windows; Xbox 360; Xbox One
- Release: NA: October 6, 2015; EU: October 9, 2015
- Genres: Action-adventure, hack and slash
- Mode: Single-player

Transformers: Devastation is a 2015 action-adventure game developed by PlatinumGames and published by Activision. Based on the Transformers franchise, players control five Autobots as they battle to stop a Decepticon plot to turn the Earth to metal. Several creatives who worked on past Transformers media, including writers, actors, and musicians, contributed to the game's development.

Devastation was released on PlayStation 3, PlayStation 4, Windows, Xbox 360, and Xbox One in October 2015, and was the final Transformers game released by Activision. Critics praised the gameplay and faithfulness to its source material, but criticized its short length.

== Gameplay ==
Transformers: Devastation is an action game similar to PlatinumGames' other titles such as Bayonetta (2009). Players control one of five Autobots—Optimus Prime, Bumblebee, Sideswipe, Wheeljack, and Grimlock—as they battle against Decepticons and Insecticons who stand in their way. Each of the Autobots fight using light and heavy melee attacks and ranged weapons, and are able to transform into vehicle mode at any time, including during attack combos. Similar to Bayonetta, dodging attacks with precise timing activates Focus, which slows down time around the player, allowing them to counterattack their opponents. Each Autobot also has a unique special ability, as well as a powerful Overdrive attack that can be performed after filling an energy meter by attacking enemies.

The game consists of seven chapters, which are each split up into several missions, including some optional side-missions. Players are ranked on each mission based on their overall performance. Players can earn credits and gain new weapons by defeating enemies, destroying certain objects, and solving puzzles hidden across each chapter. Credits can be spent to purchase new items, moves, and weapons, forge T.E.C.H. that can be equipped to grant passive stat boosts, synthesize weapons to make them stronger, or increase the stats of each Autobot. Special Kremzeek collectibles can also be found in each chapter that unlock character and concept artwork. The game features five levels of difficulty, two of which must be unlocked by clearing the game. An additional Challenge Mode offers 50 stand-alone missions.

== Plot ==
A swarm of Insecticons and giant metal claws emerge from beneath a city, wreaking havoc. The Autobots arrive to investigate, battling Megatron and the Constructicons, who form Devastator. Megatron escapes into a hatch leading underground and reveals the attacks are the automatic defenses of the Proudstar, an Autobot ship which crashed on Earth millions of years ago that Megatron now controls, and announces his plans to use the Insecticons to cyberform the Earth, turning it into metal and creating a new Cybertron.

Optimus Prime explains that the Proudstar, captained by Nova Prime, was a ship meant to convert uninhabited planets into ones suitable to support Cybertronian life, and that its Ferrotaxis supercomputer contains a record of Cybertron's history and culture which had been lost during the Great War. Entering the ship, the Autobots fight off Soundwave and attempt to access the plasma core powering the Proudstar and the Insecticons, but the security system ejects the core from the ship. Emerging, the Autobots learn the core's location from Thundercracker and follow the trail. While they are distracted by fighting Blitzwing, Starscream arrives to take the core back to the Decepticons, but loses control of it due to a storm and crash-lands. The Autobots race Motormaster to the core, but find it damaged and at risk of an extinction-level explosion. Before they can shut it down, the rest of the Stunticons arrive and form Menasor. The combiner throws the core to Megatron, who takes it to Cybertron to be repaired.

The Autobots follow the Decepticons through the Space Bridge, but are delayed by Starscream and Shockwave, arriving too late to catch Megatron. Conversing with Shockwave, Optimus discovers that during the Proudstar's voyage, Nova Prime and the crew were corrupted by Unicron and had begun to cyberform inhabited planets as well, planning to do the same to Earth before they crashed. Returning to the Proudstar, the Autobots try once again to disable the core, but it ruptures and becomes inaccessible, leaving the Ferrotaxis, now in Megatron's possession, as the only way to stop the cyberforming process and keep the plasma core from exploding. The group head for the Proudstar's control room, fighting off the Decepticon forces as they ascend. Megatron escapes, ordering Devastator and Menasor to finish them, but the Autobots defeat them and follow Megatron, fighting him for the Ferrotaxis.

As he is defeated, Megatron fires the Ferrotaxis from his cannon into orbit and a swarm of Insecticons chase it. Optimus rides on one of the Insecticons into space after it, with Megatron in pursuit. The two engage in a final battle above the Earth, with Optimus emerging victorious, but cannot shut down the Insecticons due to Megatron's tampering. Left with no choice, Optimus destroys the Ferrotaxis, stopping the cyberforming and preventing the plasma core's detonation. As he falls back to Earth, Optimus declares Earth is now their true home, and they must protect it at all costs. Later, with Defensor and Superion's support, Optimus commissions plans for the Optimus Maximus project. In a post-credits scene, aboard the Proudstar, Nova Prime awakens from stasis.

== Development ==
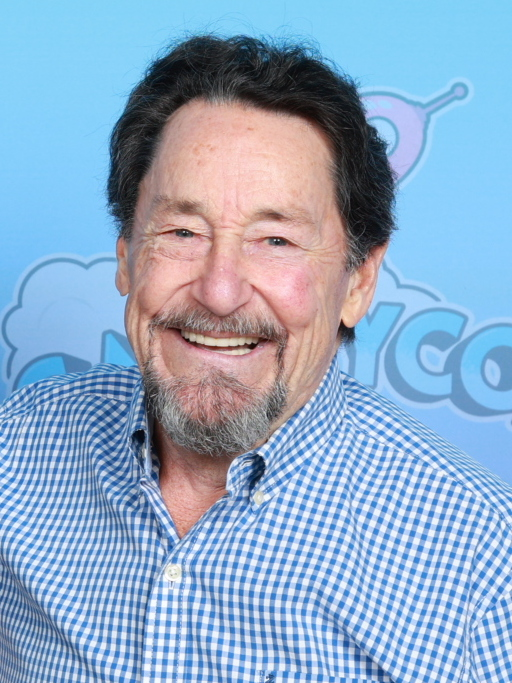
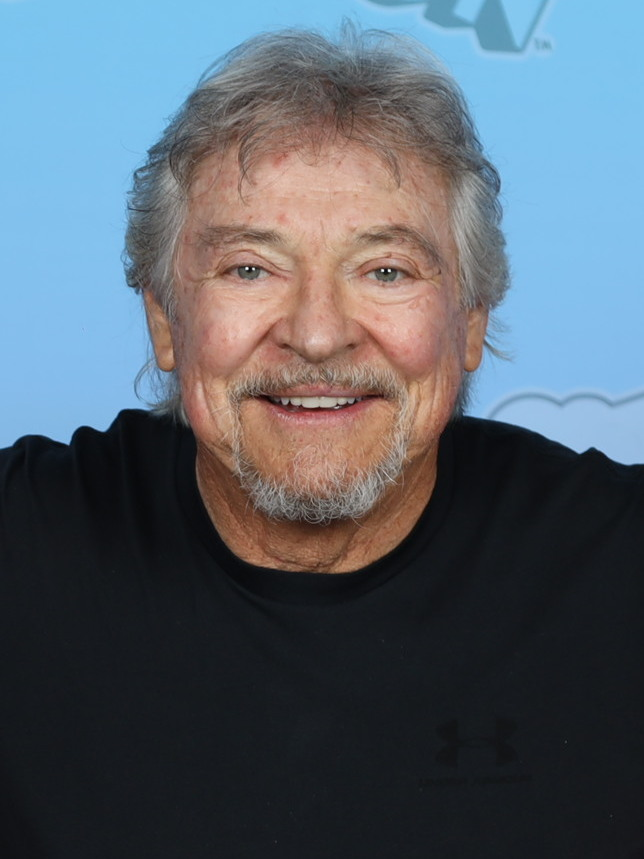
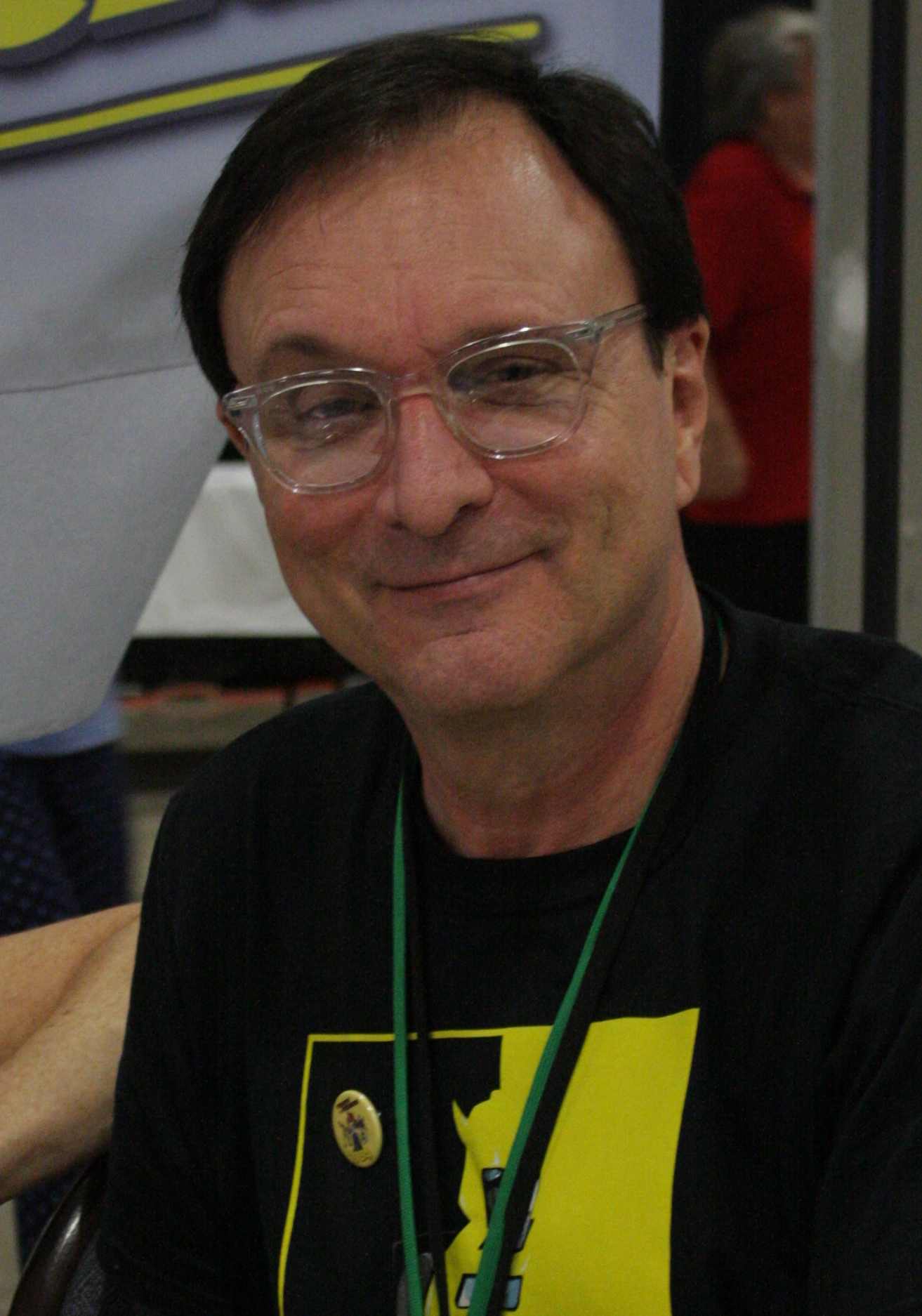
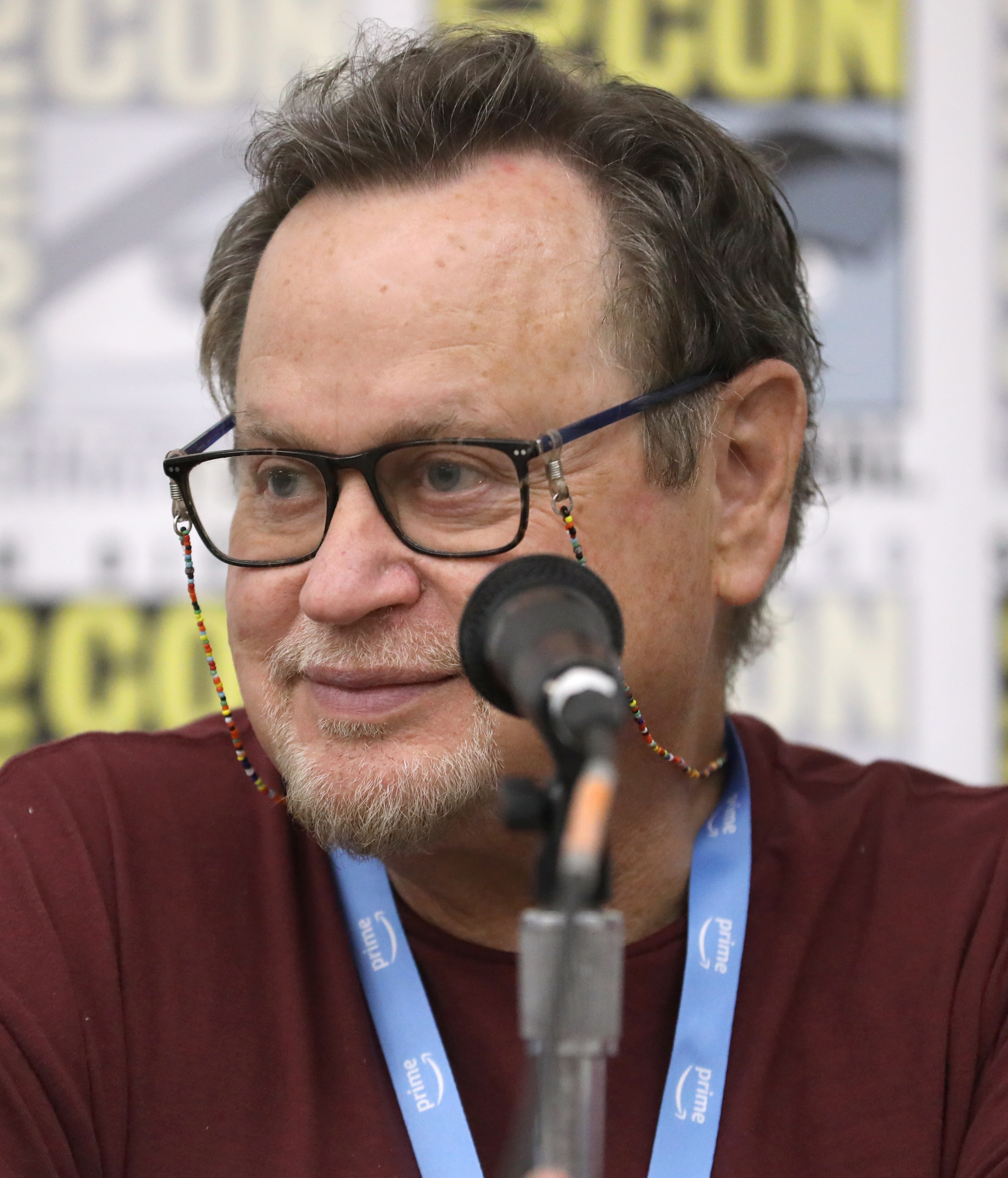
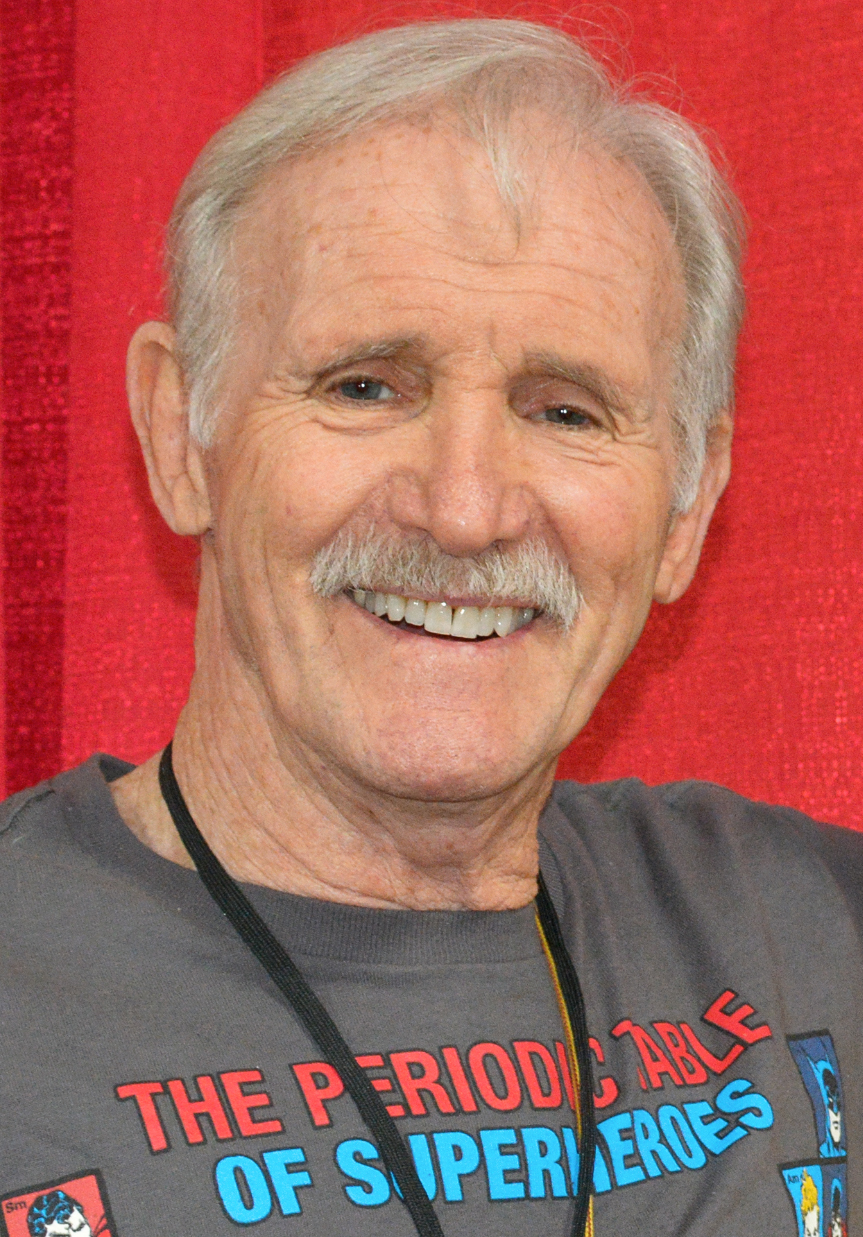
The principal voice actors of Transformers: Devastation (L-R): Peter Cullen (Optimus Prime), Frank Welker (Megatron, Soundwave), Dan Gilvezan (Bumblebee), Gregg Berger (Grimlock, Long Haul), and Michael Bell (Sideswipe, Scrapper) all returned to reprise their roles from the 1984 animated series.

Devastation's visual design is most strongly inspired by the original The Transformers (1984–1987) animated series with elements from both the IDW Publishing comic series and the Combiner Wars toyline. The game's story is written by former IDW Transformers writer and editor Andy Schmidt, and features several of the surviving voice actors from the original show reprising their roles. The Transformers: The Movie (1986) composer Vince DiCola and Angry Birds Transformers (2014) co-composer Kenny Meriedeth contributed to the soundtrack.

== Release ==
Transformers: Devastation was publicly announced at E3 2015 and released on October 6, 2015, in the United States and October 9 in Europe. A downloadable content bundle containing character skins based on Nemesis Prime, Red Alert, and Goldfire, along with three additional weapons, was offered as a pre-order incentive. This bundle was made available for general purchase on November 10.

Devastation was the final Transformers game released under Activision's 2006 licensing agreement with Hasbro. Following the deal's expiration, the game and its DLC were removed from sale via digital storefronts in December 2017, alongside other Transformers games published by Activision.

== Reception ==
Reception

Aggregate score
| Aggregator | Score |
|---|---|
| Metacritic | (PS4) 77/100 (XONE) 75/100 (PC) 74/100 |

Review scores
| Publication | Score |
|---|---|
| Destructoid | 8.5/10 |
| Edge | 8/10 |
| Eurogamer | 8/10 |
| Game Informer | 8/10 |
| GamesMaster | 82% |
| GameSpot | 7/10 |
| GamesRadar+ | 3.5/5 |
| GamesTM | 6/10 |
| GameTrailers | 7/10 |
| IGN | 7.7/10 |
| PlayStation Official Magazine – Australia | 80% |
| PlayStation Official Magazine – UK | 70% |
| Official Xbox Magazine (UK) | 80% |
| PCMag | 3.5/5 |
| Play | 80% |
| Polygon | 6.5/10 |
| Push Square | 8.10 |
| VideoGamer.com | 70% |

Transformers: Devastation received "generally favorable" reviews, according to video game review aggregator Metacritic. Critics praised the game's nostalgia, graphics, and gameplay, while criticisms were directed towards the repetition, frustrating camera controls, and the game's short length.

GameSpot's Scott Butterworth stated that "Devastation recaptures [the Transformers franchise's] spirit and presents it anew."

Mike Fahey of Kotaku considered the game to be an answer to his 14-year-old inner child's Christmas list, saying that he "downloaded the game, started it up and spent several hours grinning like an idiot." He praised the gameplay as "brutal, lightning-fast war" in a "beautiful symphony of destruction" across a secret-packed "sprawling city map", with a "satisfying combat system that rewards timing and tenacity" based upon "silky-smooth melee combos". However, he found the camera system to be "a mess" and the gameplay to be repetitive. He summarized it as "the closest gaming has come to a playable Generation One Transformers cartoon".

Giving a score of 6.5 out of 10, Justin McElroy of Polygon called PlatinumGames "one of the industry’s best action developers" and called the game "Platinum’s love letter to old school Transformers". He said the game's "numerous shortcomings will likely warn away all but the most diehard G1 fans", who are nonetheless "in for a treat". He found frustration in the camera manipulation, the melee button-mashing, and the boss battles, concluding that the player's "only meaningful interaction with the world of Transformers Devastation is beating the living hell out of a whole lot of robots in disguise."

Giving a 7.7 out of 10, Jose Otero of IGN stated that the "high-octane action is a rad, over-the-top direction".

Destructoid awarded the game a score of 8.5 out of 10 and called it "charming", saying that it is "not perfect, but it's easy to ignore the rough spots when faced with so many engaging design decisions and entertaining moments. A memorable game that's hard not to like and recommend to others."
