= The Legend of Korra (video game) =

2014 video game

- Developer: PlatinumGames
- Publisher: Activision
- Director: Eiro Shirahama
- Producers: Atsushi Kurooka; Robert Conkey
- Designer: Isao Negishi
- Writer: Tim Hedrick
- Composers: Naofumi Harada; Hitomi Kurokawa
- Platforms: PlayStation 3; PlayStation 4; Windows; Xbox 360; Xbox One
- Release: PS3, PS4, Windows; October 21, 2014; Xbox 360, Xbox One; October 22, 2014
- Genres: Action-adventure, beat 'em up
- Mode: Single-player

The Legend of Korra (Note: Japanese: ザ・レジェンド・オブ・コーラ, Hepburn: Za Rejendo obu Kōra) is a 2014 action-adventure game developed by PlatinumGames and published by Activision, based on the animated television series of the same name which aired on Nickelodeon from 2012 to 2014. It was released in October 2014 for the PlayStation 3, PlayStation 4, Windows, Xbox 360 and Xbox One, and received mixed reviews.

The game is one of two video games based on the series. The other, The Legend of Korra: A New Era Begins, is a turn-based strategy game which was developed by Webfoot Technologies for the Nintendo 3DS. The game was removed from sale on all digital storefronts three years after its release, on December 21, 2017.

== Gameplay ==
The Legend of Korra is a third-person action game, supporting single-player play only. Players control Korra, the series' heroine, as she fights villains from the first two seasons of the series with the bending arts, a spiritual and physical practice similar in appearance to Eastern martial arts by which practitioners move and alter the elements of water, earth, fire and air. Korra can switch between four different elements on the fly, each with its own combat styles and special moves.

Waterbending is acquired first and specializes in ranged attacks. Earthbending, acquired next, features slow attacks that are very powerful and cannot be blocked. Firebending is a balanced style that once upgraded, features all three forms of attacks: Fast combos, slow but powerful, and ranged. Airbending, acquired late in the game, features fast and powerful attacks that can affect all surrounding targets. Korra also acquires the "avatar state" near the end of the game; it lasts a shorts period, but grants Korra powerful attacks that combine all four elements.

The game tries to persuade the player into using counterattacks. The player can initiate a counterattack by blocking an enemy attack just before it connects. Counterattacks are orders of magnitude more powerful than direct attacks. Counterattacking is the only way of defeating bosses in a reasonable amount of time, as defeating them with direct attacks can take hours. Electrical and earth-based attacks cannot be countered.

The game takes about four to six hours to play through, but contains "a New Game+ of sorts". These include an endless runner with Naga, and pro-bending matches, where teams of three try to bend each other out of an arena. This mode, which implements the pro-bending rules depicted in the series, is available after completing the game, with the player controlling the "Fire Ferrets" team made up of Korra and her friends Mako and Bolin.

== Setting and plot ==
The game takes place in the two weeks between the second and third seasons of the series, which aired in 2013 and 2014 respectively. Korra is opposed by a "chi-blocker" who, at the start of the game, strips Korra of her bending abilities, which she has to regain over the course of the game. The game's main villain, Hundun, is named after a chaotic entity in Chinese mythology. An ancient, evil being previously trapped in the spirit world, he was released into the physical world by Korra's opening of the spirit portals at the end of the second season. The game sees him sow chaos in the world and pursue his grudge against the Avatar.

== Development ==
This screenshot from an early development version of the game shows Korra fighting opponents using waterbending. The game's cel-shaded art style is intended to resemble the animation of the TV series.

The Legend of Korra, the animated drama TV series on which the game is based, aired on Nickelodeon and online from 2012 to 2014 as a sequel to the series Avatar: The Last Airbender. It received critical acclaim, and was commissioned to run for four seasons and a total of 52 episodes.

The game based on the series was announced in June 2014. It was developed by PlatinumGames, known for the Bayonetta series of action games among others, and published by Activision. The game is scripted by Tim Hedrick, a writer of the TV series, who collaborated with series creators Bryan Konietzko and Michael Dante DiMartino on the plot and main villain. The cutscenes are animated by Titmouse, Inc., and the cover art (chosen by public vote) is by series character designer Christie Tseng. The game made use of the voice actors and the music of the TV series.

Robert Conkey of Activision explained that they chose Platinum on account of their record of developing action games, which he described as having a "very smooth, very flashy, and very cool" style. Platinum producer Atsushi Kurooka said that Platinum chose to adapt The Legend of Korra, a series unknown in Japan, after watching it with the aid of translated scripts, and being impressed by the series's blend of "interesting action, a really good story, comedy, and romance". According to Kurooka, the studio aimed to make the game emulate the look and feel of the television series as closely as possible, including its visual and sound direction: Kurooka said that screenshots of the game were indistinguishable from those of the series.

== Reception ==
Reception

Aggregate score
Aggregator	Score
Metacritic	(PC) 64/100 (PS4) 54/100 (XONE) 49/100

Review scores
Publication	Score
Computer and Video Games	2/10
Destructoid	7/10
Eurogamer	4/10
Game Informer	5.5/10
GameSpot	3/10
GameTrailers	6.5/10
IGN	4.2/10
PC Gamer (US)	63/100
Polygon	5/10
Hardcore Gamer	3/5
Metro	3/10

=== Pre-release ===
Appraisals of the game during development were positive. After playing an alpha build of the game in June 2014, Destructoid described the game as a "pretty solid action brawler". The reviewer praised the thorough implementation of the various bending styles, the detailed and fluid combat system, and the cel-shaded art style. GameSpot's reporter was "encouraged by the art style and some aspects of the combat", but uncertain whether the developers would be able to balance the demands of faithfulness to a franchise and the expectations of quality combat gameplay raised by their previous titles. IGN described the early version as having "all the depth I'd expect to see from this developer bundled with a faithful artistic interpretation" of the source material, noting the "surprisingly deep" combat system and the "tastefully re-created animations" from the series.

=== Post-release ===
The Legend of Korra received "mixed or average" reviews, according to video game review aggregator Metacritic. It was panned by Dan Stapleton of IGN as a "poorly made tie-in that can't even stand up as a competent third-person action game". The reviewer noted the game's simplistic combat, the absence of the series' wit and charm, and the low-quality cutscenes. Kevin VanOrd of GameSpot was also highly critical of the game, writing that it "tries its best to boot M. Night Shyamalan's The Last Airbender film out of its rightful position as 'worst Avatar-related thing yet produced.'" Chris Carter at Destructoid summed up the game as a "nice but brief romp" with no real narrative that "plays out like a 'light' version of Platinum's previous games". At Polygon, Philip Kollar described the game as a "shallow, short experience full of segments that feel poorly designed and ill-considered", with frustrating mechanics and annoying mini-games. Paul Tassi of Forbes, noting the "scathing" reviews the game received, wrote that, like other adaptations of the series, it showed "a fundamental misunderstanding of the source material, all but completely devoid of a plot and other characters outside Korra herself". For Eurogamer's Simon Parkin, the game's shortcomings were the "hallmarks of a work-for-hire project rushed to meet a Christmas deadline", and he considered the game "a misfire that means Platinum's name no longer guarantees quality".
