= Star Fox (1993 video game) =

On-rails shooter video game

- North American box art
- Developers: Nintendo EAD; Argonaut Software
- Publisher: Nintendo
- Director: Katsuya Eguchi
- Producer: Shigeru Miyamoto
- Designer: Shigeru Miyamoto
- Programmers: Dylan Cuthbert; Giles Goddard; Krister Wombell
- Artist: Takaya Imamura
- Composer: Hajime Hirasawa
- Series: Star Fox
- Platform: Super Nintendo Entertainment System
- Release: JP: 21 February 1993; NA: 23 March 1993; EU: 3 June 1993; UK: 5 June 1993
- Genre: Rail shooter
- Mode: Single-player

Star Fox, known as Starwing in PAL regions, is a 1993 rail shooter game developed by Nintendo EAD and Argonaut Software, and published by Nintendo for the Super Nintendo Entertainment System (SNES). The first entry in the Star Fox series, the story follows pilot Fox McCloud and his elite squadron of mercenaries known as the Star Fox team defending their homeworld of Corneria against the invading forces of the malevolent mad scientist Andross.

It was the second 3D Nintendo game after X for the Game Boy in 1992, and the first Nintendo game to use polygonal graphics, achieved with the Super FX graphics chip included in the cartridge. At the time, the complex display of three-dimensional models using polygons was uncommon in console games.

Regarded as one of the greatest and most influential video games of all time, Star Fox pioneered 3D rail shooter gameplay on home consoles, popularized the use of the Super FX chip, and established the Star Fox series as a flagship Nintendo franchise. The game received critical acclaim, sold more than 4 million copies, and inspired numerous sequels and spin-offs. A sequel, Star Fox 2, was developed but remained unreleased until 2017 as part of the Super NES Classic Edition. The next-released game in the series, Star Fox 64, is a 1997 reboot for the Nintendo 64 and further expanded the series' influence on 3D space combat and squad-based gameplay.

The game was re-released worldwide as part of the Super NES Classic Edition in September 2017, and for the Nintendo Classics service in September 2019.

== Gameplay ==
The game is portrayed from both a third-person and first-person 3D perspective. Gameplay is centred around aerial combat. From left to right clockwise, the game's heads-up display shows the player's number of lives, ammunition, boost meter, and shield strength. This scenario shows the player in a boss fight.

Star Fox is a rail shooter in a third-person and first-person 3D perspective. The player must navigate Fox's spacecraft, an Arwing, through environments while various enemies (spaceships, robots, creatures, etc.) attack them. Along the way, various power-ups are placed in the stage to help the player. The player receives a score at the end of each level based on how many enemies have been destroyed and how well the player has defended their teammates. At the end of each level there is a boss that the player must defeat before progressing to the next level.

Control of the Arwing includes thrusters and retro-rockets that allow the player to temporarily speed up or slow down. These can be used to maneuver around enemy attacks and other obstacles. Damage is incurred incrementally via loss of shield energy before the destruction of the craft. The game also has a small degree of locational damage detection: if the ship's wings clip against obstacles or the ground too much, they will break off, adversely affecting the craft's handling and removing the ability to upgrade weapons.

At the beginning of the game, the player is given a choice of one of three routes to take through the Lylat system. Each of these routes corresponds with a certain level of difficulty and has its own series of unique levels, providing additional challenge and replay value on subsequent playthroughs. The three game paths all contain the planet Corneria (the first level) and Venom (the last level), but they each have different versions depending on the path taken.

In each level, the player is accompanied by three computer-controlled wingmen: Peppy Hare, Slippy Toad and Falco Lombardi. At certain pre-scripted points, one will fly into the player's view, often either chasing an enemy or being chased and asking for assistance. Ignoring a wingman's pleas will result in him taking damage, or even being shot down. They cannot be damaged by the player's own lasers (although they will complain if hit). Regardless of their survival, wingmen are not present during boss battles, but rejoin the player before the next stage. A player may choose to help their wingmen when they ask for assistance, as doing so will allow them to engage some of the enemies not destroyed by the player, helping the player to succeed and additionally making it easier to achieve maximum score in a given level. Additional points are also granted at the end of each level depending on the health of each wingman. If a wingman gets shot down, he will not return for the rest of the game.

== Plot ==
This game takes place in a fictional planetary system called Lylat, which is inhabited by anthropomorphic animal species such as foxes, frogs, birds, rabbits, and apes. It contains the planets Corneria and Venom, representing good and evil, respectively. Andross, an evil mad scientist, has fled to the planet Venom after being banished from Corneria, and declared war on the latter, unleashing an enormous army to wreak havoc on the Lylat System. General Pepper, the commanding officer of Corneria's defense force, dispatches a prototype high-performance fighter aircraft called the "Arwing". However, lacking in time to train pilots for the new aircraft, he summons the Star Fox, a team of mercenary adventurers with outstanding combat skill, to defeat Andross. Fox McCloud, the leader of the mercenary team, is accompanied by his teammates, Falco Lombardi, Peppy Hare, and Slippy Toad.

== Development and release ==
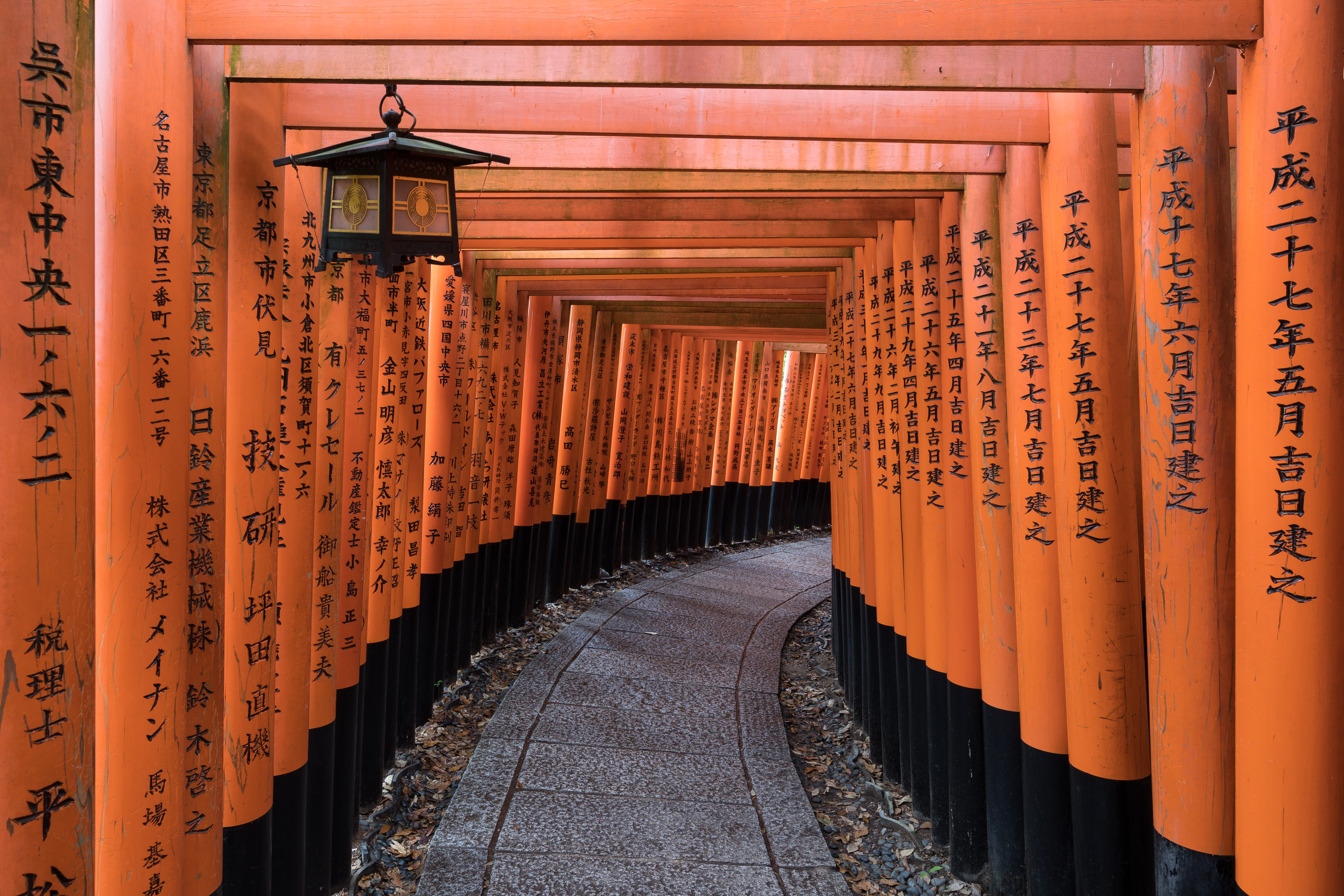
The Senbon Torii gates at the Fushimi Inari-taisha shrine inspired the gates the player would fly through in Star Fox.

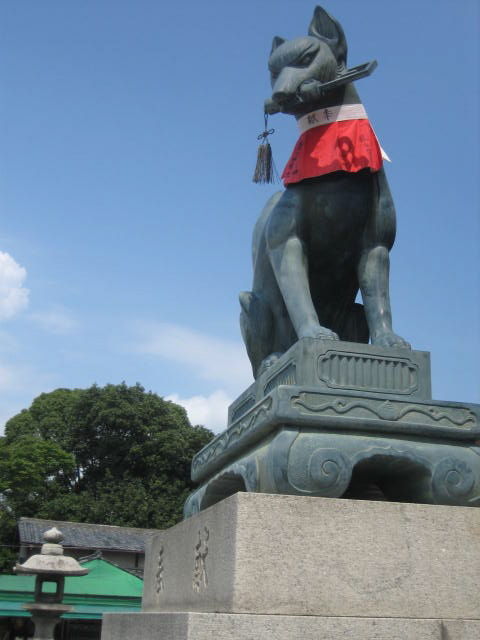
A kitsune statue at Fushimi Inari-taisha was inspiration for the character design of Fox McCloud.

Nintendo worked closely with Argonaut Software during the early years of the NES and Super NES. They developed a prototype on the NES, initially codenamed "NESGlider", which was inspired by their earlier 8-bit game Starglider, and ported this prototype to the Super NES (the polygonal style used ended up having a strong resemblance to Starglider 2). Programmer Jez San told Nintendo that this was as good as it could get unless they were allowed to design custom hardware to make the Super NES better at processing 3D. Nintendo assented to this, and San hired chip designers to make the Super FX chip, the first 3D graphics accelerator in a consumer product. The Super FX was so much more powerful than the Super NES's standard processor that the development team joked that the Super NES was just a box to hold the chip. Argonaut did much of the base programming for the game's engine, while the character designs and artwork were mainly done in-house by Nintendo. The main game design was done by Shigeru Miyamoto and Katsuya Eguchi. Characters were designed by Takaya Imamura, and music was composed by Hajime Hirasawa. Nintendo suggested the "arcade-style shooting" element of the game and Argonaut brought the idea of using spaceships.

Miyamoto cited the X-Wings from Star Wars as inspiration for the Arwings. He frequently visited the Fushimi Inari-taisha shrine, about a fifteen-minute walk from the Nintendo corporate headquarters, and the Senbon Torii gates there inspired the idea of gates that the player would need to pilot the ship through. Miyamoto stated that he wanted the Star Fox series to star animal characters since he was not interested in making a series with conventional science fiction stories with humans, robots, monsters, and superheroes. He decided to use a fox as a main character since it reminded him of Fushimi Inari-taisha. Miyamoto explained that he had always planned to use the English word "fox" instead of the Japanese word "kitsune" (キツネ). Imamura used Japanese folklore as an inspiration to add a bird and a hare as two other protagonists. He also added a toad; the inspiration came from a staff member of Nintendo EAD who used a toad as his personal mascot. Imamura populated the Cornerian army with dogs and the enemy army with monkeys, and made General Pepper a dog and Andross a monkey, since there is a Japanese expression about fighting like dogs and monkeys. Miyamoto created several puppets and photographed them to use as artwork for the cover of the Star Fox game; Miyamoto was a fan of British puppet dramas, such as Thunderbirds, so he wanted the game cover to feature puppets. Shirogumi created large-scale puppets for a promotional video for the game, which were destroyed after the video was completed. The game was released under the title Starwing in Europe due to the similarity of the title Star Fox to the name of the German company StarVox.

Programmers Dylan Cuthbert and Giles Goddard recalled how when they moved to Kyoto to work in the Nintendo office, they were put in a room remotely located from the rest of Nintendo. As they were not full-time Nintendo employees, Nintendo did not want them to have access to confidential and secret projects they were working on at the time. They also discussed how Miyamoto would come visit them frequently, providing advice and feedback in between puffs of a cigarette, as Miyamoto was a notorious chain smoker at the time.

The game debuted at the Consumer Electronics Show (CES) held at Las Vegas in January 1993.

On the weekend of April 30 to May 2, 1993, the "Super Star Fox Weekend Competition" took place at approximately 2,000 retail locations within the United States. Competitors received a limited edition Star Fox pin, and those who accumulated a particularly high score received Star Fox T-shirts as prizes. The competitors who achieved the highest score at their respective locations were entered into a randomized grand prize drawing for a choice between an all-expenses-paid trip for four to a choice of London, Paris, Sydney, or Tokyo, or a lump sum of $15,000. The grand prize was won by Trevor Petersma of Garland, Texas, who opted for the cash prize. In the United Kingdom, the competition was known as the Starwing Challenge and was held in gaming shops across the country on May 29. Nintendo Netherlands held the Starwing competition at various game-selling stores in early 1993; the winner of each day won a large Starwing poster. Annual Starwing competitions were held during the Dutch Nintendo Championships, held in October, from 1993 to 1996. After the original competition, a limited number of the game cartridges created and used for the competition were sold through the Nintendo Power magazine, listed in the Spring 1994 "Super Power Supplies" catalogue that was mailed to subscribers, with an original list price of $45. The cartridges feature a time-limited single-player mode on modified stages, as well as an exclusive bonus level. The altered start-up screen displays "Official Competition Cartridge".

According to Peter Main, Nintendo's vice president of marketing at the time, Star Fox had a marketing budget of $15 million.

== Reception ==
Reception

Aggregate score
Aggregator	Score
GameRankings	88%

Review scores
Publication	Score
Computer and Video Games	96/100
Electronic Gaming Monthly	9/10, 8/10, 9/10, 9/10
EP Daily	9/10
Famitsu	10/10, 9/10, 8/10, 7/10
Game Informer	9.25/10; 8.25/10
GameFan	94%, 96%, 91%, 95%
GamePro	20/20
GamesMaster	97%
Nintendo Power	4.125/5
Official Nintendo Magazine	96/100
Super Play	93%
Total!	(UK) 96% (DE) 1-
VideoGames & Computer Entertainment	9/10
Control	94%
Electronic Games	95%
Entertainment Weekly	A
Hippon Super!	8/10
Marukatsu Super Famicom	8/10, 10/10, 7/10, 9/10
N-Force	92/100
Nintendo Game Zone	95/100
SNES Force	85%
Super Action	96%
Super Gamer	96%
Super Pro	96/100

Star Fox received generally favorable reception from critics, holding a rating of 88% based on seven reviews according to review aggregator platform GameRankings. The game's groundbreaking use of 3D polygon graphics were universally lauded. Next Gen Magazine pointed out Star Fox as helping pioneer the use of 3D video game graphics. The game has been cited as a transitional title that successfully combined linear level design from older games with new 3D polygonal graphics.

Entertainment Weekly wrote that "the first game to incorporate Nintendo's 'Super FX' computer chip, this pseudo-3D space shooter moves so fast that it practically qualifies as virtual reality. Unlike most games of this genre, though, Star Fox shows some heart behind the hardware — rarely have such powerful spacecraft been piloted by so adorable an array of frogs, birds, and bunnies".

The game was a commercial success upon release. It topped the Japanese Famitsu sales charts from February to March 1993, selling 325,000 units in Japan by December 1993. Nintendo sold more than 1.7 million units in Japan and the United States by the end of March 1993, becoming the fastest-selling video game launch in North America up until then. It also topped the UK sales chart in June 1993. It went on to sell over four million copies worldwide by 1998.

=== Accolades ===
Star Fox was awarded Best Shooter of 1993 by Electronic Gaming Monthly. The game took the No. 115 spot on EGM's "The Greatest 200 Videogames of Their Time", and 82nd best game made on a Nintendo System in Nintendo Power's Top 200 Games list. In 1995, Total! rated Star Fox 10th on their Top 100 SNES Games and wrote that because of the Super FX Chip the game's graphics and gameplay are unlike any other SNES shooter. In 2009, Official Nintendo Magazine ranked the game 28th on a list of greatest Nintendo games. In 2018, Complex ranked Star Fox 24th in their "The Best Super Nintendo Games of All Time".

== Legacy ==
Star Fox has become an established Nintendo franchise, with six more video game instalments, an LCD game, and numerous appearances by its characters in other games and media such as the Super Smash Bros. series and Starlink: Battle for Atlas.

During the game's release, Nintendo collaborated with Kellogg's and Nelsonic to distribute a promotional Star Fox LCD Game Watch to those who bought a box of corn flakes and sent the order form to Kellogg's. Its four levels crudely recreate gameplay from the original game.

The conception and development of Super Mario 64 was inspired by Miyamoto's experience working on Star Fox, Miyamoto saying "When I saw what could be done with 3-D modeling on the Star Fox game, I knew we could do much more."

Star Fox led to direct sequel Star Fox 2 developed for Super NES but unreleased until Super NES Classic Edition (2017), the reboot Star Fox 64 (1997) for Nintendo 64, action-adventure GameCube games Star Fox Adventures (2002) and Star Fox: Assault (2005), real-time strategy Star Fox Command (2006) for Nintendo DS, and further adaptions of the original game's story Star Fox Zero (2016, alongside tower defense Star Fox Guard) for Wii U and Star Fox (2026) for Nintendo Switch 2.
