= Star Fox Zero =

2016 video game

- North American box art
- Developers: Nintendo EPD; PlatinumGames
- Publisher: Nintendo
- Directors: Yugo Hayashi; Yusuke Hashimoto
- Producers: Shigeru Miyamoto; Tadashi Sugiyama; Atsushi Inaba
- Composers: Hiroshi Yamaguchi; Yukari Suita; Hitomi Kurokawa; Naofumi Harada; Rei Kondoh; Keiki Kobayashi
- Series: Star Fox
- Platform: Wii U
- Release: JP: April 21, 2016; NA/EU: April 22, 2016; AU: April 23, 2016
- Genres: Rail shooter, shoot 'em up
- Modes: Single-player, multiplayer

Star Fox Zero (Note: Japanese: スターフォックス 零(ゼロ), Hepburn: Sutā Fokkusu Zero) is a 2016 rail shooter game developed by Nintendo and PlatinumGames and published by Nintendo for the Wii U. It is the sixth installment in the Star Fox series and a reimagining of Star Fox 64. Formally announced at E3 2015, the game was released in April 2016. A standalone tower defense game, titled Star Fox Guard, was bundled with the game.

Star Fox Zero received mixed reviews from critics. Praise was given to its level design, graphics, and boss battles, but its length was criticised as short and its control scheme as impractical. The game's similarity to Star Fox 64 also divided critics, as some were also disappointed by the game's general lack of originality and innovation, including the absence of an original plot. Miyamoto has stated that Star Fox Zero is neither a remake, sequel, or prequel, but a reimagining of Star Fox 64.

Following its release, no new Star Fox games would be developed until Star Fox (2026) a decade later.

== Gameplay ==
Gameplay screenshot from E3 2015

Star Fox Zero is a 3D rail shooter that largely follows the gameplay of its predecessors, predominantly Star Fox 64, in which the player controls Fox McCloud as he pilots his Arwing craft through various levels. The game is controlled using the Wii U GamePad, with the left control stick used to maneuver the craft while gyroscopic controls can be used to aim weapons. A cockpit view is displayed on the second screen to assist with aiming. The minus button on the GamePad can be used to swap the two displays at any time.

Some of the game's vehicles can transform in certain situations. For example, the Arwing can transform into a bipedal Walker (which originated in the then-unreleased Super NES game Star Fox 2) that lets the player freely walk around on platforms and in enclosed spaces. The Landmaster tank can transform into the Gravmaster, which can perform extended aerial maneuvers for a short time. A new vehicle introduced to the series is the Gyrowing, a drone-like helicopter that can lower a small robot called Direct-i that can enter small spaces, hack into computers, or latch onto explosive cubes that can then be dropped on enemies. Players can also add laser upgrades and smart bombs to their ships. Special techniques such as the charge shot, barrel roll, somersaults, and U-Turns can be performed. Two gameplay modes are featured in the game: the on-rails sections put the player in a predetermined path, while All-Range Mode allows the player to move freely in a closed-off space. The game has no life system, and if the vehicle is destroyed or a specific objective is not reached in some stages, the mission fails and the player will have to start over. Gold rings, which have a similar healing effect to silver rings, also function as continues when three are collected: levels are split into multiple phases that mark checkpoints, and if Fox dies or fails to complete the mission, he can retry from the last phase he reached if he has collected three gold rings.

Various elements return from previous games, including Fox's teammates, Falco Lombardi, Peppy Hare, and Slippy Toad, who can assist the player if they protect them from enemy attacks, as well as the rival team Star Wolf members Wolf O'Donnell, Leon Powalski, Pigma Dengar, and Andrew Oikonny. Several level locations have also returned, including Corneria, Zoness, Titania, Fichina, and Fortuna, while five new locations, Sector Alpha, Area 3, Sector Beta, Sector Gamma, and Sector Omega, have been added. The game is also compatible with Amiibo figures; players can scan the Fox and Falco Amiibo to respectively unlock the Retro Arwing, which is based on the model used in the original SNES game and cannot lock on but has a larger blast radius, and the Black Arwing, which sports a black and red color scheme and is stronger and faster but takes more damage. Both Arwings can also be unlocked by acquiring enough gold medals in the campaign.

== Development ==
Lead Star Fox Zero producer Shigeru Miyamoto demonstrates the game behind closed doors at E3 2014. The game was one of three projects he demonstrated at the show, alongside Project Guard and Project Giant Robot.

The game's development began with experimentation on leftover assets from a never-released Star Fox game for the Wii that had been worked on by a small group since about 2008. The Wii project never took form because, in the words of series creator Shigeru Miyamoto, the team could not come up with enough compelling new ideas for it. The game's existence was confirmed in a press sheet on June 8, two days before E3 2014 began. During the Electronic Entertainment Expo on June 10, Time leaked information about the game in the morning, then Nintendo announced the title publicly, and Nintendo's E3 presentation again hinted at its further details later. During an interview with Wired, Miyamoto expressed his desire to work with external developers for faster completion of the project.

In an interview with GameSpot, Miyamoto revealed that both the Project Guard and Project Giant Robot tech demoes shown off alongside Star Fox for Wii U were connected in some fashion. During a Nintendo Direct presentation in March 2016, Project Guard was formally revealed as Star Fox Guard, and bundled both digitally and as a physical copy alongside Star Fox Zero. Project Giant Robot was never released, officially being canceled in 2017.

Miyamoto stated that the game's main storyline and overall presentation were structured episodically, taking inspiration from the 1960s television series Thunderbirds, with the main missions featuring traditional Star Fox gameplay acting as "primetime programming", while side-missions featuring more quirky, experimental gameplay mechanics (such as those found in Project Guard and Project Giant Robot) act as "late-night programming". Yusuke Hashimoto of PlatinumGames said they were approached by Nintendo about co-developing the game after requesting to add an Arwing-themed bonus level to Bayonetta 2. Hideki Kamiya of PlatinumGames had also previously expressed his desire for Nintendo to approach them about developing a new Star Fox game. According to Nintendo, the story of Zero is neither a prequel or a sequel to previous Star Fox games.

== Release ==
In December 2014, Miyamoto stated that Star Fox Zero would be released before the new installment of The Legend of Zelda series in 2016. He also confirmed that the game would be compatible with Amiibo, but did not specify in what way. Star Fox was playable at E3 2015, and Miyamoto reiterated of the GamePad/monitor gameplay method, which would "allow for cinematic moments to blend with continuous gameplay". The planned release date was announced by Nintendo for November 20, 2015, but the game was subsequently delayed to the first quarter of 2016. The game was released in North America and Europe on April 22, 2016, and in Australia the next day.

Prior to the game's release, Nintendo of America began a contest called the "Star Fox Zero Intergalactic Art Event" that month. Entrants needed to create Star Fox Zero fan art and post it on the game's Miiverse page, with the best 40 entries winning Nintendo eShop credit. A Star Fox Zero home menu theme for the Nintendo 3DS was also released two days before the game's launch. An animated short based on the game, titled Star Fox Zero: The Battle Begins, was released online on April 20. The short was produced by Japanese animation studio Wit Studio, with assistance from Production I.G and Nintendo. The 3D CGI animation work was provided by Orange. In July, a free demo of the game was released on the Wii U eShop. The demo includes the training mode from the full game, as well as the Star Fox Zero: The Battle Begins animated short.

The game's credits hold a small tribute to former Nintendo president Satoru Iwata, who had died during the game's development. When asked if Star Fox Zero could potentially be ported to the Nintendo Switch, Atsushi Inaba of PlatinumGames stated that they did not know if it could happen, and he also said that they have not been approached by Nintendo about it. However, when asked again in a later interview with VGC, he said that if there was chance, they would like to think about porting it to Switch.

== Reception ==
Reception

Aggregate score
Aggregator	Score
Metacritic	69/100

Review scores
Publication	Score
Destructoid	7/10
Electronic Gaming Monthly	7/10
Famitsu	35/40
Game Informer	6.75/10
GamesMaster	82%
GameSpot	7/10
GamesRadar+	2.5/5
Giant Bomb	2/5
IGN	7.5/10
Nintendo Life	8/10
Nintendo World Report	8/10
Metro	8/10
Shacknews	6/10

Star Fox Zero received a mixed reception, according to the review aggregator website Metacritic. Common points of discussion include the control scheme, the short length of the campaign, and the structural similarities to earlier entries in the series.

Jose Otero from IGN praised the levels and bosses, commenting that Star Fox Zero reimagines a classic Nintendo 64 game, but was critical of its awkward controls. Similarly, Damien McFerran from Nintendo Life observed that the players need to be patient to master its problematic controls before becoming attuned to them, comparing them to Splatoon. Peter Brown of GameSpot's primary fault with the controls was that it forces the player to divide attention back and forth between the TV and GamePad. However, Brown did conclude that the second run was more enjoyable than the first, praising the branching paths and level design.

Other reviewers, conversely, found the mandatory motion-based controls frustrating or actively detrimental to the experience. David Roberts of GamesRadar felt that the game was undermined by a slavish devotion to wrapping the core design around every feature of the Wii U's GamePad, regardless of whether it makes sense or feels good to play. Arthur Gies of Polygon declined to assign a final score because he found that it was too miserable to finish the game on account of its controls.

Reviewers were also divided about the game's length and high similarity to its predecessor, Star Fox 64. Some were not bothered by it; McFerran called it a retread of Star Fox 64 and its original game Star Fox, but found this aspect of the game "reassuringly familiar". On the other hand, Ray Carsillo of EGM said that the game failed to build on Star Fox 64 in new and exciting ways. He was disappointed by the choice to re-imagine an older game instead of creating a brand new installment. Steve Watts of Shacknews found the alternate vehicle missions, where the game sets itself apart from earlier titles, ultimately distracted from the core Arwing gameplay. McFerran concluded that Star Fox Zero is "easily on-par with the excellent N64 entry from which it draws so much inspiration". Dan Ryckert of Giant Bomb was more critical, considering the game a relic of 2002.

=== Sales ===
The game was the highest-selling game on Amazon.com on April 19, 2016 based on its preorders, a position it held for two days. Days after its launch in Japan, both the standalone and Star Fox Guard Double Pack sold 8,135 and 17,114 units respectively, individually placing fifth and eighth for that sales week. Sales of both combined was 25,249 units, making it the fourth best-selling game that week overall. During the same time frame, it was also the sixth best-selling game in the United Kingdom, the third best-selling in France and the fifth in Australia. According to the NPD Group, which tracks physical sales data, Star Fox Zero was the fifth best-selling video game on any platform during the month of April. However, sales were not nearly as strong in Japan, as it became the single worst-selling game in the franchise in the country.
