= Star Fox (2026 video game) =

On-rails shooter video game

- Promotional artwork
- Developer: Velan Studios
- Publisher: Nintendo
- Composer: Stephen Barton
- Series: Star Fox
- Platform: Nintendo Switch 2
- Release: June 25, 2026
- Genre: Rail shooter
- Modes: Single-player, multiplayer

Star Fox (Note: Japanese: スターフォックス, Hepburn: Sutā Fokkusu) is a 2026 rail shooter game developed by Velan Studios and published by Nintendo for the Nintendo Switch 2. A remake of Star Fox 64 (1997), it adapts the original game's level design, story, and gameplay while introducing a new artstyle and rebooting the series. (Note: Attributed to multiple sources:)

After numerous reports and leaks of a Star Fox game following the protagonist Fox McCloud's appearance in The Super Mario Galaxy Movie (2026), Star Fox was revealed in a surprise Nintendo Direct on May 7, 2026. Its reveal drew mixed responses for its art style and the decision to again revisit Star Fox 64 after Star Fox 64 3D (2011) and Star Fox Zero.

Star Fox was released on June 25, 2026. It received positive reviews, with praise for its gameplay, graphics, and faithfulness to the original, but criticism for the lack of innovation or additional features. It has sold 1.17 million copies worldwide, making it the ninth best-selling Switch 2 game.

== Gameplay ==
Screenshot of the player performing a barrel roll in the first level, Corneria

Star Fox is a third-person rail shooter in which players control a variety of vehicles piloted by Fox McCloud. The son of James McCloud, the deceased leader and founder of the mercenary squad Star Fox, Fox leads his own revitalized mercenary squad on a mission to stop the evil mad scientist and self-proclaimed emperor, Dr. Andross, from destroying the Lylat System.

As a remake of Star Fox 64, it retains similar gameplay and controls. Controlling the Arwing, players automatically progress through the level. They must defend themselves against enemies and their surroundings, using offensive means such as lasers and bombs, or employing defensive moves like a somersault or a "barrel roll" to deflect incoming projectiles.

The main story campaign of Star Fox is divided into different levels based on different planets in the Lylat System. Levels incorporate plot elements through dialogue and cutscenes. Players can alter the outcome of each level and uncover branching pathways to other levels. Similar to Star Fox 64 and its first remake, Star Fox 64 3D (2011), the campaign supports three difficulties. While shield and boost abilities are limited at the start of each level in Normal and Hard difficulty, they can be restored and expanded on by collecting gold and silver rings scattered throughout the level. Optional tasks unique to each level can be completed for other rewards. New to the story campaign are extended cut-scenes between levels, fleshing out the narrative, characters, and world. An additional Challenge Mode is included, where individual levels can be replayed to achieve different objectives.

Two options for multiplayer are included. In a competitive battle mode, players are separated into the mercenary squads Star Fox and Star Wolf and compete across different maps with unique rules and objectives. In co-op, two players can play the campaign and challenge modes, one player piloting with traditional controls, the other aiming and gunning using the Joy-Con 2's mouse controls. The mouse controls can also be used in single-player campaigns, and the battle mode can be played with computer opponents. Additionally, the Nintendo 64 Wireless Controller is also supported.

Star Fox supports the GameChat feature of the Switch 2, both for in-game multiplayer and general video chat. Players can use a filter for any mercenary squad Star Fox member on their webcam. The GameShare feature allows the multiplayer modes to be played across multiple Switch 2 consoles and different models of the original Nintendo Switch, both via local wireless and the internet.

== Development and release ==
Star Fox was developed by Velan Studios, an American video game company based in New York who previously collaborated with Nintendo on Mario Kart Live: Home Circuit (2020). Other games developed by Velan include Knockout City, Hot Wheels: Rift Rally, and Midnight Murder Club. Star Fox was developed in Viper, the development studio's proprietary game engine, which made it possible to render cutscenes in real-time and maintain consistent 60FPS gameplay. The soundtrack of Star Fox 64 was rearranged by Max McGuire and Stephen Barton, with new tracks being composed for the added cutscenes and battle mode.

In March 2026, industry insiders and journalists, primarily podcaster NateTheHate and Video Games Chronicle, reported that a classic-style Star Fox game was in development for a mid-year release, following Fox McCloud's appearance in The Super Mario Galaxy Movie (2026). Shigeru Miyamoto would later confirm in an interview with Famitsu that the inclusion of Fox McCloud in the movie encouraged development of “a new Star Fox game”. However, Star Fox was not formally revealed until a surprise Nintendo Direct presented by Miyamoto and Yoshiaki Koizumi on May 7, 2026. The Direct itself was only announced ten minutes before broadcast. While the worldwide release date (June 25, 2026) was confirmed for most markets, the South Korea launch date was instead July 2.

Ten music tracks from the game were added to the Nintendo Music app on May 8, and a demo version was announced and released one month later during a general Nintendo Direct presentation on June 9. A different demo experience was also made available at various North American retailers alongside other Switch and Switch 2 demos. Nintendo further promoted the game throughout July with themed events and cosmetics in software such as Tetris 99 and the Nintendo Switch Online app. Additional battle mode maps were added in an update on September 29.

== Reception ==
=== Reveal ===
Fox McCloud's design in The Super Mario Galaxy Movie (left) and Star Fox (right)

Star Fox's reveal received mixed reactions. The more realistic art style and character redesigns were divisive. (Note: Attributed to multiple sources:) Many questioned the decision to remake Star Fox 64, which itself already reimagined the original Star Fox and inspired both Star Fox 64 3D and Star Fox Zero, making the 2026 installment the fifth game to use the same story.

Takaya Imamura, the Star Fox team's original character designer, said he preferred Fox's design in The Super Mario Galaxy Movie, but was nonetheless supportive of the 2026 game and praised its "clear direction". Despite preferring the "cute" art-style of the movie, he cited the designs of the 2026 game as "exactly" what he had in mind when designing for Star Fox 64. He concluded, "no matter what style or arrangement they take on, the moment these four come together, they're instantly recognised as Star Fox". He later expressed awe at the game's visual presentation, in part because the original Star Fox 64 "aimed to create demo scenes and presentations" that could compete with the PlayStation's pre-rendered graphics without contrasting with "the unique appeal of [the Nintendo 64's] real-time graphics".

=== Reviews ===
Reception

Aggregate scores
Aggregator	Score
Metacritic	81/100
OpenCritic	87% recommend

Review scores
Publication	Score
Destructoid	8/10
Eurogamer	4/5
Game Informer	8.25/10
Gamekult	7/10
GamesRadar+	4/5
Giant Bomb	4/5
IGN	8/10
Jeuxvideo.com	9/20
Nintendo Life	9/10
PC Games (DE)	7.5/10
Retro Gamer	88%
Shacknews	10/10
TechRadar	3.5/5

According to Metacritic, the game received "generally favorable" reviews based on a weighted average score of 81 out of 100 from 128 critic scores. According to OpenCritic, 87% of 149 critic reviews recommended the game.

Jim Norman at NintendoLife called it "a sublime remaster of Star Fox 64". He cautioned "those who have already played through the '97 classic hundreds of times won't find any surprises here". Nevertheless, he recommended it to both newcomers and veterans of the Star Fox series, and optimistically concluded that "if this is a taste of what the next original adventure holds, then I've never been more ready to fire up the G-Diffuser". David Caballero at GameReactor echoed the sentiment that it was "Nintendo's finest remake", and Andrew Brown of GamesRadar+ called it "the definitive way to play Star Fox 64". Asif Khan of Shacknews called it "a remarkable remake" that signposted a promising future for developer Velan Studios and the Star Fox series. Chris Melnyck of PowerUpGaming called it a "game of the year" contender and recommended it to "all Switch 2 players". Darran Jones of Retro Gamer found it superior to the Nintendo 64 original, and was only let down by no real new original content such as a new level.

Andy Robinson of VGC said it is "a fantastic way to discover or revisit a classic" despite desiring "a little more care put into restoring its smaller parts". Steve Watts of GameSpot considered the game a "bare-bones" refresh of a Nintendo 64 classic that "still holds up very well" and is available to play on Nintendo Switch Online. While Chris Schilling of Eurogamer called Star Fox "a triumph of nostalgia over innovation", he expressed hope that the game had "earned its maker the right to work on a sequel". Scott Duwe of Destructoid said "it's a worthwhile ride", but confessed he was more curious "where Star Fox heads next". Kayleigh Partleton of Pocket Tactics called it "a blast" in both solo and co-op modes, and Mike Minotti of Giant Bomb called the game "a relatively faithful remake of the franchise's best entry" that'll please those eager for a new "triple-A rail shooter".

While Daishell Wood of TechRadar called Star Fox "a solid remake of an excellent game", he bemoaned that "the campaign's short length" and "threadbare" multiplayer options did not justify the launch price. Likewise, Jada Griffin at IGN complained that "the new Challenge mode and revamped multiplayer don't go quite as far as I'd like", but praised Nintendo for proving that "the Arwing isn't out of style quite yet". Kyle Hilliard of Game Informer noted that although "another remake of Star Fox 64" was not desired, he still had "a great, nostalgic time".

=== Sales ===
During its launch week, Star Fox sold 41,680 physical copies in Japan and charted Number 1 in Japan, France, Switzerland, and the UK. Star Fox fell to Number 5 on the Japanese charts the following week with the launch of Nintendo's Rhythm Heaven Groove. In the UK, Star Fox fell to Number 4 in its second week, while in Switzerland and France it only fell to Number 3.

As of September 30, 2026, the game has sold 1.17 million copies since its release.
