= Star Fox =

Video game series

- Logo used since 2026
- Genres: Rail shooter; Shoot 'em up; Action-adventure
- Developers: Nintendo EAD (Note: Star Fox 2 was originally intended to be released in 1995, but wasn't so until 2017, when it was included in the Super NES Classic Edition.) (1993, 1997, 2006–2011, 2017); Argonaut Software (1993, 2017); Rare (2002); Namco (2005); Q-Games (2006–2011); Nintendo EPD (2016); PlatinumGames (2016); Velan Studios (2026)
- Publisher: Nintendo
- Creator: Shigeru Miyamoto
- Platforms: SNES; Nintendo 64; GameCube; DS; 3DS; Wii U; Switch 2
- First release: Star Fox; 21 February 1993
- Latest release: Star Fox; 25 June 2026

Star Fox is a series of action games created by the Japanese game designer Shigeru Miyamoto and developed and published by Nintendo. The games follow the Star Fox combat team of anthropomorphic animals, led by Fox McCloud. Gameplay involves missions around the Lylat planetary system in the futuristic Arwing fighter spacecraft, in other vehicles, and on foot. The original Star Fox (1993) is a forward-scrolling 3D rail shooter, but later games add more directional freedom.

The first game, developed by Nintendo EAD and programmed by Argonaut Software, used the Super FX Chip to create the first hardware-accelerated 3D gaming experience on a home console. The Super FX Chip is a math co-processor built into the cartridge to help the Super NES render graphics. Super FX was used in other Super NES games, some with increased processing speed. Star Fox 64 was the first Nintendo console game with force feedback.

Due to perceived problems with the German company StarVox, Star Fox and Star Fox 64 were released in PAL region territories as Starwing and Lylat Wars. However, as of Star Fox Adventures, Nintendo uses the same name globally.

== Games ==
Release timeline Main entries in bold
1993	**Star Fox**
1994
1995
1996
1997	**Star Fox 64**
1998
1999
2000
2001
2002	**Star Fox Adventures**
2003
2004
2005	**Star Fox: Assault**
2006	**Star Fox Command**
2007
2008
2009
2010
2011	Star Fox 64 3D
2012
2013
2014
2015
2016	**Star Fox Zero**
2016	Star Fox Guard
2017	**Star Fox 2** (Note: Completed and planned to be released in 1995, but cancelled and released in 2017.)
2018
2019
2020
2021
2022
2023
2024
2025
2026	**Star Fox**

=== Main series ===
==== Star Fox (1993) ====
The first game, Star Fox, or Starwing in Europe and Australia, was released for the Super Nintendo Entertainment System in 1993. Developed by Nintendo EAD and programmed by Argonaut Software, it uses the Super FX chip to provide 3D graphics during a period of predominately 2D games. Fox McCloud and his team, Slippy Toad, Peppy Hare, and Falco Lombardi, take on Andross, who threatens to overthrow the Lylat system. The concept was inspired by a shrine to the Japanese fox deity Inari Ōkami, which Shigeru Miyamoto visited regularly. The shrine's accessibility through a series of arches, influenced the gameplay. Several boss battles from the game are included as mini-games in the Wii game WarioWare: Smooth Moves, using the Wii Remote to fly the ship.

==== Star Fox 64 ====
Star Fox 64, or Lylat Wars in Europe and Australia, introduced fully spoken dialogue, off-the-rails movement, new vehicles and characters, multiplayer, and rudimentary on-foot gameplay through an unlockable multiplayer mode. It was released in 1997 for the Nintendo 64 and came bundled with the Rumble Pak, a force feedback controller attachment. Star Fox 64 retells the main story of the original Star Fox canon, with new characters and gameplay elements. New multiplayer modes include free-for-all, battle royale, and a time trial. The overall plot is expanded with relatively small core changes.

==== Star Fox Adventures ====
Star Fox Adventures was released in 2002 for the GameCube. Developed by Rare, it is predominately an action-adventure game in which Fox is armed with a mystical staff. Traditional space shooting is limited to small segments between chapters. Its roots can be traced to Dinosaur Planet, a game Rare was developing late in the life cycle of the Nintendo 64, but cancelled by Nintendo and converted into a Star Fox game. It introduced new characters, including Prince Tricky and Krystal. Taking place eight years after the events of Star Fox 64, the main antagonist is an army of dinosaurs called the Sharp Claws, led by General Scales. Fox and Krystal fall in love soon before the final boss fight when Fox saves her life. Krystal then joins the Star Fox team. The gameplay of Adventures resembles that seen in most 3D The Legend of Zelda games.

==== Star Fox: Assault ====
Developed by Namco, Star Fox: Assault was released in 2005 for the GameCube. The emphasis returned to Arwing-based gameplay, but also had portions of on-foot missions. Assault takes place one year after Adventures, with the Aparoids becoming a new threat to the Lylat system. The Star Fox team is tasked with stopping them. Along with ROB, Peppy now pilots the Great Fox, while Krystal replaces Peppy's role as one of the team's pilots.

==== Star Fox Command ====
Star Fox Command was developed by Q-Games for the Nintendo DS, and was released in 2006. It is the first Star Fox game for a handheld console and the first to offer online multiplayer. Like the original Star Fox, gameplay is completely aircraft-based, and uses chatter much like the SNES game instead of the voice acting of later installments. Command utilizes a new system of gameplay, incorporating strategy and abandoning its "fly-by-rail" roots. Players plot flight paths and engage enemies in an open arena-style flying mode using the Nintendo DS's touch screen. Each character has a unique ship with different abilities. For example, Slippy's ship has no lock-on feature and shorter boosts, but has stronger lasers and shielding; Fox McCloud pilots the redesigned Arwing II. Command takes place two to three years after the events of Star Fox: Assault and features nine possible endings, determined by the player's story progression choices.

==== Star Fox 64 3D ====
Star Fox 64 3D is a remake of Star Fox 64 for the Nintendo 3DS, released in 2011, as the second Star Fox game on a handheld console. The game was announced in a conceptual trailer for the Nintendo 3DS at E3 2010.

With a few exceptions, the gameplay in Star Fox 64 3D is very similar to that of the original version. The player controls Fox's Arwing fighter using the circle pad to steer, the shoulder buttons to bank left and right, and the four right-hand buttons to fire lasers and bombs, boost and brake. The D-Pad allows the player to perform somersaults and u-turns, which can also be performed with combinations of other controls, and to zoom in and out from the Arwing in "All-Range Mode". The player can enable "Gyro Controls", using the 3DS's internal gyroscope sensor to control the Arwing. Character dialogue, messages and control information are displayed on the touch screen.

A new multiplayer "Battle Mode" allows up to 4-player LAN multiplayer (via Download Play), or to battle against CPU opponents. During battles, each player's face appears on opponents' screens in a live reaction feed from the console's internal camera.

==== Star Fox Zero ====
Star Fox Zero was developed by Nintendo and PlatinumGames for the Wii U and released in April 2016. The first Star Fox game on a home game console in over 10 years, the game is controlled using the Wii U GamePad's gyroscope feature. Star Fox Zero also came packaged with a retail version of Star Fox Guard, a tower defense spin-off game.

==== Star Fox 2 ====
Star Fox 2 was originally cancelled even though it was completely finished. Many of its new ideas were implemented for the then-forthcoming Star Fox 64, such as the rival team Star Wolf, all-range mode, charge shot, and a multiplayer mode (though Star Fox 2's multiplayer mode was no longer featured in the final beta). Other elements such as choosing characters, map pointing, and multiple ship variations were later implemented in Star Fox Command. A beta version of the Landmaster tank (the Walker) also makes an appearance as an Arwing with leglike attachments. A patch for the final beta was released by a third-party team of hackers to make the game complete, removing the debug mode menus, making an English translation, and removing subroutines for a buggy third vehicle not used in the game.

The game was officially released as part of the Super NES Classic Edition, and was later added to the SNES Nintendo Classics service for Nintendo Switch Online subscribers.

==== Star Fox (2026) ====
A remake of Star Fox 64 for the Nintendo Switch 2, Star Fox, developed by Velan Studios as the studio's second collaborative project with Nintendo following Mario Kart Live: Home Circuit, was announced via a Nintendo Direct on May 7, 2026, in the midst of rumors and leaks relating to a revival of the Star Fox franchise and a coinciding new release, and following the franchise's main character Fox McCloud's appearance in The Super Mario Galaxy Movie. Released on June 25, 2026, to a generally positive reception, Star Fox's gameplay, structure, storyline, and characters remain largely unchanged from Star Fox 64, although the game's release on the then-modern Nintendo Switch 2 allowed the game to be the most graphically and technically impressive entry in the franchise.

=== Spin-offs ===
==== Star Fox (Nelsonic Game Watch) ====
Shortly after the release of the first Star Fox game, in June 1993, Nelsonic developed a promotional LCD-based Star Fox Game Watch, redeemable with a coupon found in boxes of Kellogg's Corn Flakes. It has four levels and the object is to fly toward the Attack Carrier and destroy it while dodging plasma balls and falling structures. It includes a pair of earphones and a headphone jack but lacks a volume control. Nelsonic later released it in stores in a different watch appearance.

==== Star Fox Guard ====
Star Fox Guard was first shown at E3 2014 under the name of Project Guard, and was announced under a final name in a March 2016 Nintendo Direct. Guard was released for the Wii U in April 2016, coinciding with the release of Star Fox Zero. Developed by Nintendo and PlatinumGames, Guard is a tower defense game where the objective is to switch between different views on security cameras and protect the player's base by shooting enemy robots. A physical version of the game came bundled alongside the physical version of Star Fox Zero, and is also available separately as a digital download on the Wii U eShop.

=== Cancelled games ===
==== Virtual Boy game ====
This game was a tech demo of what would have been a Star Fox game had the Virtual Boy adopted the series. The closest game to it is Red Alarm. Cinematic camera angles were a key element, as they are in Star Fox 2. At both E3 1995 and at the Winter Consumer Electronics Show 1995, the demo showed an Arwing doing various spins and motions. One observer called it "an intriguing technical demo featuring a Star Fox-like spacecraft doing a lot of spinning and zooming in 3D. It is made of filled polygons and looks much better than the unfilled Red Alarm vehicles". Attendees to these two events were given 3D glasses to watch the demos and tech videos that were played on screens at the show floors, and from these videos.

==== Arcade game ====
Originally planned as a companion game for Star Fox: Assault, an arcade game was abandoned and never released. It was scheduled for release in 2004–2005, but was cancelled for unknown reasons.

=== Related games ===
==== Super Smash Bros. series ====
Various Star Fox characters and stage themes have appeared in the Super Smash Bros. franchise of fighting games. Fox McCloud has appeared in every series entry as a playable character, while Falco Lombardi has been unlockable in all games from Super Smash Bros. Melee onward. Wolf O'Donnell appears as an unlockable fighter in Super Smash Bros. Brawl and Super Smash Bros. Ultimate.

==== WarioWare series ====
In WarioWare: Smooth Moves for Wii, there is a Star Fox minigame in the style of the SNES title with three stages. Using the Wii Remote, the player pilots the Arwing through Corneria, Sector X, and Titania. At the end of each level, the player fights R.O.B. (not ROB 64 from the Star Fox series, but rather the R.O.B. attachment for the NES), who is armed with a large NES Zapper. In WarioWare Gold for Nintendo 3DS, another SNES-styled Star Fox microgame appears, this time challenging players to not crash into anything when their ship is on the verge of being destroyed.

==== Super Mario Maker ====
Fox, Falco, Peppy, and Slippy, along with the Arwing Walker from Star Fox Zero, appear as Mystery Mushroom costumes in Super Mario Maker.

==== Starlink: Battle for Atlas ====
The Nintendo Switch version of Ubisoft's action-adventure game Starlink: Battle for Atlas features exclusive missions featuring Star Fox characters and ships. As part of the game's toys-to-life features, the Nintendo Switch starter pack includes figures of Fox McCloud and his Arwing that can be used in-game.

== Other media ==
=== Nintendo Power comics ===
A monthly Star Fox comic strip, illustrated by Benimaru Itoh, was printed in issues 45 to 55 of Nintendo Power in 1993. It is an adaptation of the events of the original Star Fox, with some exclusive characters not seen in any of the games to date. One such character is Fara Phoenix, a vixen who becomes the fifth member of Star Fox after they saved her from Venomian forces, who forms a close relationship with Fox. The story follows the Star Fox team as they went from outlaws on Papetoon, to an elite Arwing fighter squadron. Fox, Falco, and Andross were the only 3 characters whose backgrounds were fully explained in the story. A sequel set after the events of the game was produced in Nintendo Power by the same team which continued the story, featuring Andross's DNA being split between two clones. The clones then begin an invasion of the Lylat system, laying waste to everything in their path. The Star Fox team springs back into action, while Fara— dressed in clothing once worn by Fox's deceased mother, as the team had been enjoying some down time when the invasion begins— manages to provide an accidental, yet significant, distraction to one of the Andross clones when he spots her on a monitor due to a revelation that the original Andross was in love with Fox's mother and accidentally murdered her with a bomb intended for Fox's father, which the clone says over a loudspeaker, as the clone believes he is speaking to the deceased vixen, rather than Fara. Enraged by this new knowledge, Fox battles his way through the forces of Andross's clones, one of whom slays the other as he considers the feelings of the one who believes Fara to be Fox's mother is a weakness that is unneeded, and destroys the survivor. The story ends with the Lylat system celebrating the ultimate defeat of Andross as what remains of his forces flee from the forces of Corneria and the surviving fighters of the other worlds in the system.

=== Lylat Wars Comic ===
The official Club Nintendo magazine in Germany released a Star Fox 64 comic drawn manga-style to retell the game's storyline. The comic shows some scenes that were not present in the game—for instance, Wolf kicking Andrew and Pigma out of Star Wolf because they acted against his orders (and thus saving Star Fox from the plot of the two). The comic ends with a robotic Andross being defeated.

=== Manga ===
A one-issue Star Fox comic by Kazumi Sakamoto (坂本かずみ) was printed in the Comic Bonbon 1993 Spring Vacation Jumbo Edition (春休みジャンボ増刊号), published in April of that month.

A one-issue Star Fox comic by Takao Aoki was printed in the 1993 Spring Break Edition (増刊号 93年春休み増刊) of Corocoro Comic.

A Star Fox 64 comic by Takahiro Yamashita is within the April and June 1997 issues of Bessatsu Corocoro Comic.

=== Star Fox: Farewell, Beloved Falco ===
Star Fox: Farewell, Beloved Falco is a Japanese manga created by Nintendo, and part of the main Star Fox series. The manga was released on the official Star Fox Adventures Japanese website, serves to bridge the events of Star Fox 64 and Star Fox Adventures, explaining Falco's absence from the team in the latter game.

In the series, Captain Shears runs a base on the sand-dune planet Titania, but unbeknownst to Star Fox, Shears is actually taking part in an experiment to resurrect Andross. In the beginning, Katt Monroe returns from Star Fox 64 along with a rag-tag team of roughnecks with apparently an inside lead on the fact that Shears is evil. Fox remains unconvinced, which ends up in a sparring match between him and Falco, thus adding more emphasis into Falco's intentions of leaving Star Fox. Eventually, it is revealed to Star Fox that Shears is indeed evil, and Fox storms in to stop the resurrection plan once and for all. The manga ends with the Star Fox team learning of Dinosaur Planet's broken state and choosing to investigate, as in the opening sequence of Adventures.

=== Star Fox Zero – The Battle Begins ===
A 14-minute web video of Star Fox Zero produced by Shigeru Miyamoto, Production IG and Wit Studio, features the Star Fox team in an anime-styled battle of the first level in Star Fox Zero: Corneria. The short was later released via the Wii U eShop as part of the Star Fox Zero: The Battle Begins + Training demo.

=== Cancelled TV series ===
In an interview with The Serf Times, comedian and television host, Adam Conover revealed that back in February 2015, he and other members of CollegeHumor were working along with Shigeru Miyamoto to produce a clay-animated show of the series. However, the project was cancelled a month later by Nintendo after plans for a series based on The Legend of Zelda were leaked by Netflix.

=== The Super Mario Galaxy Movie ===
In The Super Mario Galaxy Movie (2026), Fox McCloud appears as a main character and is voiced by Glen Powell. He has a relatively substantial role in the movie, as he pilots Rosalina's observatory with Toad and the Lumas to transport Mario, Luigi, Peach, and Yoshi to Bowser's fortress in the Space Junk Galaxy.

== Recurring elements ==
=== Arwing ===
The Arwing is the principal craft of the Star Fox team, and has appeared in all Star Fox games to date.

The Arwing has had considerable changes, though all versions of it retain a basic shape: a central fuselage, two crested streamlined pods attached at the sides, known as Gravity Diffusers, or G Diffusers, and wings mounted on the side pods. From Star Fox 64 onwards, the two side pods are a distinctive blue color.

The Arwings make an appearance in the Super Smash Bros. series. In this series, Arwings are used by Fox and Falco as their on-screen introduction, in addition to being used as a stage obstacle on Fox's Level, Sector Z. The Arwings on this stage would occasionally fly through and shoot lasers at the players. While Sector Z did not return in future titles, the stage Corneria is very similar to it and also features Arwings. In the Venom, Lylat Cruise, and Orbital Gate Assault stages they are seen flying in the background. Additionally Arwings are featured as collectible trophies in certain Smash Bros. games. The Arwing is also an easter egg in The Legend of Zelda: Ocarina of Time but can only be accessed by a GameShark code. It appears in Kokiri forest as an enemy who can be defeated by Link with either a boomerang, fairy bow, or fairy slingshot. Once defeated, they fall to the ground, explode and its blast may inadvertently kill Link. The Arwing also appears as a piece of furniture in Animal Crossing: Wild World and Animal Crossing: City Folk. When touched by the game character, the Arwing will briefly play the Star Fox theme music. It also appears over a box in Super Mario RPG, Hinopio's Market, but it's just a decor. In Bayonetta 2, miniature Arwings replace Bayonetta's guns when she is wearing the game's unlockable Star Fox costume. In addition, the plane in the final level is also replaced with an Arwing.

Miyamoto explains that the craft is called Arwing "because it was like one big wing shaped like an A".

=== Landmaster ===
The Landmaster M1 tank first appeared in Star Fox 64 (1997, Nintendo 64) as a tracked light tank in two of the game's missions and one of the game's multiplayer maps. It appears in Star Fox: Assault (2005, GameCube), though with some changes, including the substitution of tank treads with tires. The Landmaster tank appears in Super Smash Bros. Brawl (2008, Wii) as the Final Smash for Fox, Falco, and Wolf. In Smash Bros. for Nintendo 3DS and Wii U (2014, Nintendo 3DS, Wii U) it is the Final Smash for Fox and Falco.

=== Wolfen ===
The Wolfen is piloted by Wolf O'Donnell. This ship would have first appeared in Star Fox 2, but was instead first seen in Star Fox 64 on the planet Fichina (mistranslated as Fortuna in Star Fox 64, fixed in 64 3D) – or alternatively – Bolse. Additionally, taking the hard path to Venom enables the player to battle the Wolfen II, which outperforms the Arwing. In Star Fox: Assault, Team Star Wolf piloted the original versions of the Wolfen against the Star Fox team, and they are playable in the game's multiplayer mode. The Wolfen has appeared throughout the Super Smash Bros. series.

== Reception ==
Aggregate review scores
Game	GameRankings	Metacritic
Star Fox	88%	–
Star Fox 64	88/100	89%
Star Fox Adventures	82/100	80%
Star Fox: Assault	67/100	71%
Star Fox Command	76/100	76%
Star Fox 64 3D	81/100	82%
Star Fox Zero	69/100	69%
Star Fox	-	81% (Note: Score based on 127 reviews)

The Star Fox series has had mostly positive reviews, the most acclaimed being Star Fox 64, with Star Fox Zero receiving the most mixed reviews. Star Fox took the No. 115 spot on EGM's "The Greatest 200 Videogames of Their Time", and 82nd best game made on a Nintendo System in Nintendo Power's Top 200 Games list. It also received a 34 out of 40 from Famitsu magazine, and a 4.125 out of 5 from Nintendo Power Magazine. Next Gen Magazine pointed out Star Fox as helping pioneer the use of 3-D video game graphics. The game has been used as an example of how, even with a fully polygon design, the game was still very similar to older games in that there was a set path to travel through each level.

As Star Fox Adventures took a different approach to the franchise, many fans complained it was too much like a role-playing adventure game, such as The Legend of Zelda. Regardless, it was critically praised. In an IGN poll for voting from a list of ten Nintendo characters for favorite Nintendo character of all time, Fox came in fourth, behind Link, Mario, and Samus respectively.

In October 2009, Shigeru Miyamoto said that he was disappointed that sales of the Star Fox series in Japan had decreased during the preceding period.

Because of the popularity of the series, Google introduced an Easter egg. Typing "do a barrel roll" or "Z or R twice" into the search bar, the screen rotates 360°.
