= Star Fox 64 =

1997 video game

- North American cover art
- Developer: Nintendo EAD
- Publisher: Nintendo
- Director: Takao Shimizu
- Producer: Shigeru Miyamoto
- Designer: Shigeru Miyamoto
- Programmer: Kazuaki Morita
- Artist: Takaya Imamura
- Writer: Mitsuhiro Takano
- Composers: Koji Kondo; Hajime Wakai
- Series: Star Fox
- Platforms: Nintendo 64, iQue Player
- Release: Nintendo 64: JP: April 27, 1997; NA: June 23, 1997; PAL: October 20, 1997; iQue Player: CHN: November 18, 2003
- Genres: Rail shooter, shoot 'em up
- Modes: Single-player, multiplayer

Star Fox 64, (Note: Japanese: スターフォックス64, Hepburn: Sutā Fokkusu Rokujūyon) known as Lylat Wars in PAL regions, is a 1997 rail shooter game developed and published by Nintendo for the Nintendo 64. It is the second Star Fox game, following Star Fox (1993) for the Super Nintendo Entertainment System (SNES). It was the first Nintendo 64 game to support the Rumble Pak, which initially came bundled with retail copies.

Nintendo developed Star Fox 64 after canceling Star Fox 2 for the SNES. It sold more than 4 million copies, making it the best-selling game in the series and the ninth best-selling Nintendo 64 game. Critics lauded its precise controls, voice acting, multiplayer modes, and replay value, which is achieved through the use of branching gameplay paths. Star Fox 64 is widely recognized as the best entry in the Star Fox series and is considered one of the greatest video games of all time.

Star Fox 64 was remade for the Nintendo 3DS as Star Fox 64 3D (2011) and for the Nintendo Switch 2 as Star Fox (2026). Star Fox 64 was also the basis for Star Fox Zero (2016) on the Wii U, which also borrowed ideas from the at-the-time unreleased SNES game Star Fox 2.

== Gameplay ==
Star Fox 64 is a 3D rail shooter game in which the player controls one of the vehicles piloted by Fox McCloud, usually an Arwing. Most of the game takes place in "Corridor Mode", which forces Fox's vehicle down an on-rails path straight forward through the environment. In Corridor Mode, the player's vehicle can be maneuvered around the screen to dodge obstacles and can also perform a somersault to get behind enemies or dodge projectiles. The Arwing is also capable of deflecting enemy fire while performing a spinning maneuver called a "barrel roll" (actually an aileron roll in real-life aviation terms). The Arwing and Landmaster can charge up their laser cannons to unleash a powerful lock-on laser.

In addition to Corridor Mode, some stages, including multiplayer and most boss fights, take place in "All-Range Mode". In this variant, the player can move freely in a three-dimensional space within the confines of a large arena. The Arwing can also perform one new maneuver in All-Range Mode: a U-Turn to change direction.

The player can fly or drive through power-ups to collect them. These include silver and gold rings that refill the vehicle's shields, weapon upgrades, wing repairs, extra lives, and Nova bombs.

Returning from the original Star Fox are wingmen that fly with the player in their own Arwings. Fox's wingmen periodically attack enemies or are pursued into the player's field of view, requiring the player to shoot down the pursuers before the wingman has to retreat to the Great Fox mothership for repairs (the character will then be unavailable to start the next stage, but may return if enough time passes). Each wingman provides a different form of assistance to the player: Slippy Toad scans bosses and displays their shields on the player's screen, Peppy Hare provides gameplay advice, and Falco Lombardi occasionally locates alternate routes through stages. Some stages also feature special appearances from supporting characters Katt Monroe or Bill Grey, who assist the team.

The game features a branching level system, in which more difficult paths are unlocked by completing certain objectives. Players can also change paths once the current mission is accomplished. All routes start at Corneria, eventually putting the player in contact with the Star Wolf Team, and end at Venom in a confrontation with Andross.

Medals are earned by accomplishing a mission with all wingmen intact with a certain hit total. Obtaining medals unlocks bonus features, such as new multiplayer vehicles, cosmetic changes to Fox in single player, and additional game settings such as "Expert Mode".

=== Vehicles ===
The Landmaster in-game

The Arwing is the primary fighter craft used by the Star Fox team. The player can use the fighter's boost meter to perform special techniques to avoid collisions, change direction, and gain tactical advantages in combat. Certain levels also put the player in a tank-like vehicle called the Landmaster, as well as a submarine named the Blue Marine on the planet Aquas. Each vehicle shares some tactical characteristics with the Arwing while providing its own unique gameplay elements.

=== Multiplayer ===
Star Fox 64 features split-screen multiplayer support for up to four players simultaneously. At first, users can only play using the Arwing fighter, but by earning certain medals in the main campaign, players can unlock the Landmaster tank and fight on foot as one of the four members of Star Fox equipped with a bazooka. Multiplayer is the only place where players can use a Landmaster with upgraded lasers.

There are three modes of multiplayer play: a "point match" in which the player must shoot down an opponent a certain number of times, a "battle royal" in which the last player left wins, and a "time trial" to destroy enemy fighters.

== Plot ==
=== Characters ===
The Star Fox team is a group of mercenaries who are enlisted by General Pepper to defend the Lylat System. The team consists of:

- Fox McCloud: A red fox who took over leadership of the mercenary team after his father, James McCloud, was captured and killed by Andross in a prior assault on Venom. Fox is the main protagonist and only playable character in Story Mode.
- Falco Lombardi: A pheasant who is an excellent fighter, but is also quite cocky and self-assured. He looks for alternate routes and shortcuts.
- Peppy Hare: A rabbit who was part of the original Star Fox team. He escaped and survived when Pigma betrayed the team, which led to James's capture and death by Andross. He serves on the current Star Fox team as a mentor to Fox during missions.
- Slippy Toad: A frog who is the team's mechanical expert. He is cheerful and energetic, but also prone to getting himself in trouble. He provides the player with valuable information about certain enemies and bosses.
- ROB 64: A robot who pilots the Great Fox, the Star Fox team's spacecraft.

Allies:

- General Pepper: a bloodhound and commanding officer of the Cornerian militia.
- Bill Grey: Fox's bulldog friend and Cornerian wing commander.
- Katt Monroe: Falco's paramour and former gang member.

Antagonists:

- Andross: The game's primary antagonist who resembles a monkey or ape. He is an evil mad scientist who is intent on capturing and controlling the Lylat System.
- Wolf O'Donnell, a wolf who commands a mercenary team called Star Wolf and Fox's rival.
- Leon Powalski, a sinister chameleon with a suave attitude on the Star Wolf team.
- Pigma Dengar, a pig and traitor to the original Star Fox team who was responsible for James McCloud's capture and death by Andross and joined Star Wolf.
- Andrew Oikonny, Andross's nephew who fights for Star Wolf.

=== Story ===
On Corneria, the fourth planet of the Lylat System, the disgraced scientist Andross is exiled to Venom by General Pepper for nearly destroying the planet using biological weapons. Five years later, Pepper detects suspicious activity on Venom. Pepper hires the Star Fox team—James McCloud, Peppy Hare, and Pigma Dengar—to investigate. After Pigma betrays the team, Andross captures James and kills him, while Peppy barely escapes from Venom alive.

Two years later, Andross launches an attack across the Lylat system. To defend Corneria, Pepper summons the new Star Fox team, headed by James' son, Fox McCloud. Peppy Hare serves as Fox's mentor, and Fox's friends, Falco Lombardi and Slippy Toad round out the team. While traveling through several planets, the team battles with Andross' henchmen, including the rival mercenary team Star Wolf. After the team arrives at Venom, Fox confronts Andross alone, with the encounter taking two different forms depending on how the player approaches the planet. If the player arrives from Bolse, Fox destroys a robotic version of Andross, leaving Andross himself adrift in the Lylat System. If the player arrives from Area 6, Fox reveals Andross' true form as that of a floating brain, and finally kills him. Shortly before his death, Andross activates his base's self-destruct system in a last-ditch attempt to kill Fox. However, James seemingly appears and guides Fox out of the exploding base before disappearing.

After defeating Andross in either encounter, Fox returns with his team to Corneria for a victory celebration. Pepper offers the team the opportunity to join the Cornerian Army, but Fox declines and the team departs. Following the credits sequence, the player's final score is presented as a bill Pepper receives from Star Fox for their services.

== Development ==
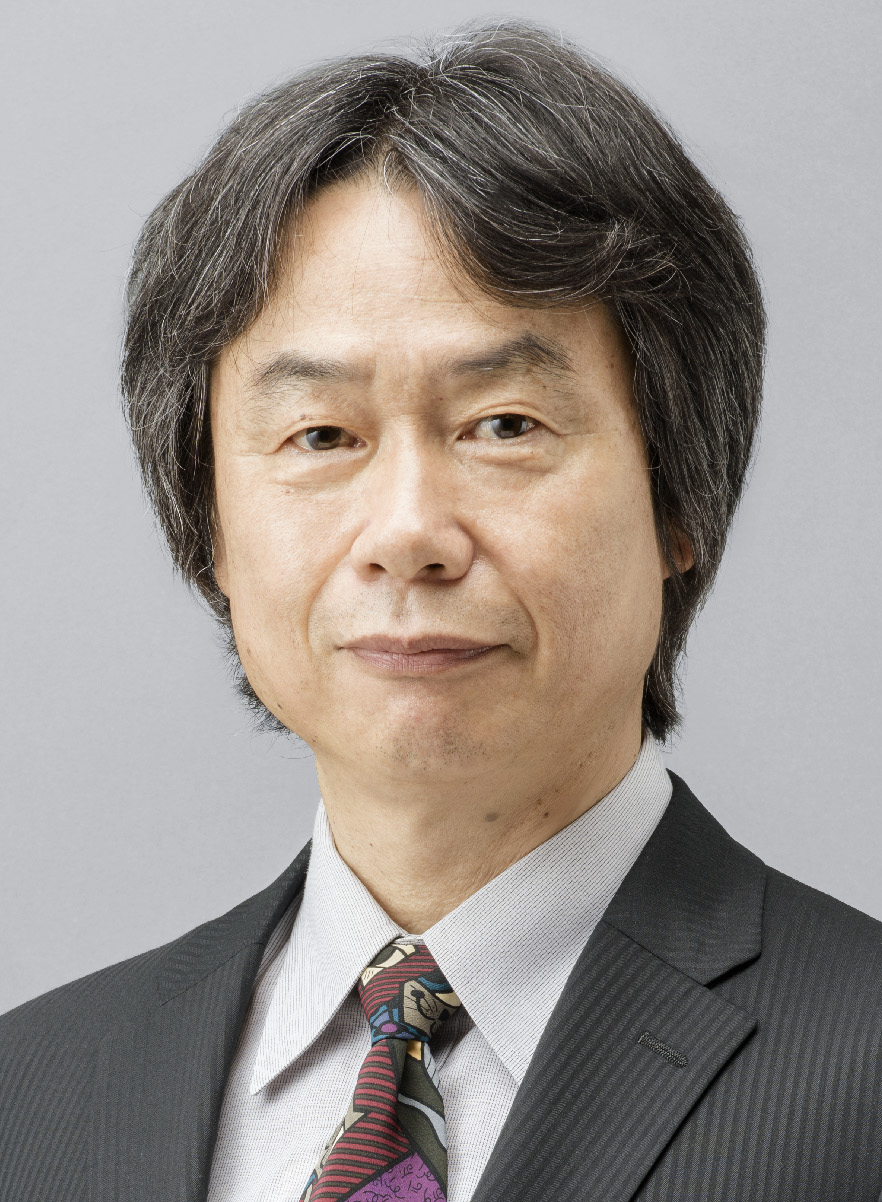
Lead producer and series creator Shigeru Miyamoto

After the release of Star Fox in 1993, Nintendo began developing Star Fox 2 for the SNES in 1993, with Shigeru Miyamoto returning as the producer. However, 3D technology was advancing quickly, with competition from the Sony PlayStation and Sega Saturn. Concerned that the 16-bit graphics would compare poorly against newer games, Nintendo canceled Star Fox 2 to prioritize its upcoming Nintendo 64 console.

Star Fox 64's development began with a series of experiments by the character designer Takaya Imamura and the programmer Kazuaki Morita. As Morita was new to 3D programming, creating something entirely new was difficult. They also had no final Nintendo 64 hardware, instead having to use a bulky development computer and a modified Super Nintendo controller without analog sticks; the actual system hardware was being used by the team working on Super Mario 64, which was considered to be a higher priority game. The pair decided to begin development by porting the original Star Fox, which they thought would be better for easing into 3D. As this was Morita's first attempt at learning 3D, he began with inputting his own data and placing objects like cubes on a course, and then launched basic-looking Arwings; this prototype was affectionately named "Star Box". Imamura and Morita continued their experiments for six months, becoming attached to it and wanting to realize it as a commercial product, while the higher-ups at Nintendo were reportedly not enthusiastic about the project and were even waiting for the two to give up on it. All this would change, however, when the game that would form into Star Fox 64 was first shown off at Shoshinkai 1995, where they had displayed ten seconds of promotional footage, and from there the production was properly green-lit, with director Takao Shimizu coming on board.

While Imamura was credited solely as Star Fox 64's art director, he would actually be responsible for many other aspects, from planning, to writing the overall plot, instructing the composers on what kind of music he wanted for it, and coming up with the gameplay mechanics and graphics, later describing it as "the game of his life". Miyamoto had two overall goals and themes for Star Fox 64: The first was to create a more fleshed out Star Fox game, as they weren't able to achieve a high enough processing speed for the original Star Fox because of hardware limitations. The other goal was also to retain some of the best elements from the then-cancelled Star Fox 2, not wanting all of that development teams' efforts to go to waste. As such, the development team, which was composed primarily of different staff members from those who worked on Star Fox and Star Fox 2, barring certain alumni such as Miyamoto and Imamura, cribbed heavily from the work that had been done in those two games, with the former estimating that roughly 60% of 64's concepts came from the original game, 30% from the cancelled sequel, and the remaining 10% was original work done during development. In particular, Miyamoto said that "All-Range Mode, Multi-Player Mode and the Star Wolf scenario all came from Star Fox 2". In regards to the All-Range mode, Morita reportedly worked on this aspect in secret initially as an experiment, inspired by what he saw from Star Fox 2. The game's branching pathways were meant to act as a middle ground between the original Star Fox's static difficulty routes and also Star Fox 2's more free-form gameplay. At some point in development, it was decided to include extra NPC characters such as Bill and Katt as a way to enhance the experience based on player interactions, to make their choices in the branching paths feel like they mattered.

One new aspect of gameplay was the addition of levels that used the Landmaster tank and the Blue-Marine submarine, which were conceived of by members of the development team (rather than Miyamoto himself) in response to Miyamoto's suggestion to include a "human-type craft", which the team generally did not approve of. The team planned add multiple underwater levels found that the underwater levels slowed down the pacing. The team also wanted to include another variation of the Venom stage, where Fox would step out of the Arwing and battle Andross on-foot with a bazooka, but this was discarded for time, and its remnants were repurposed for the battle mode.

With the underlying gameplay largely complete early in development, Miyamoto and the team focused the majority of their efforts on graphics, audio and dialogue, and enemy AI, seeking to harness the Nintendo 64's processing power. For example, inspired by Miyamoto being a fan of the British puppet-based show Thunderbirds, the development team animated the characters opening and closing their mouths in a puppet-like fashion while speaking, which reduced the overall amount of animation work. The team also realized that adding dynamic audio would enhance the 3D gameplay experience as the player's allies could audibly signal when the player was being pursued by an offscreen enemy. In writing dialogue, the developers sought to invoke traditional historical dramas, adding more conventional lines such as "I've been waiting for you, Star Fox" and "You're becoming more like your father". Edgier dialogue such as "I guess it's your turn to be thankful" was written for the character Falco Lombardi, while more supportive dialogue such as "Never give up. Trust your instincts!" came from the character Peppy Hare. Originally, the development team themselves actually tried to provide the voice lines for the characters, with Imamura in particular providing the voice for Fox and programmer Nobuhiro Sumiyoshi providing the voice for Leon; this was met with negative reception internally and thus it was decided to switch over to using professional voice actors. This developer's dub would eventually be uncovered several years later via the Nintendo data leak of 2020.

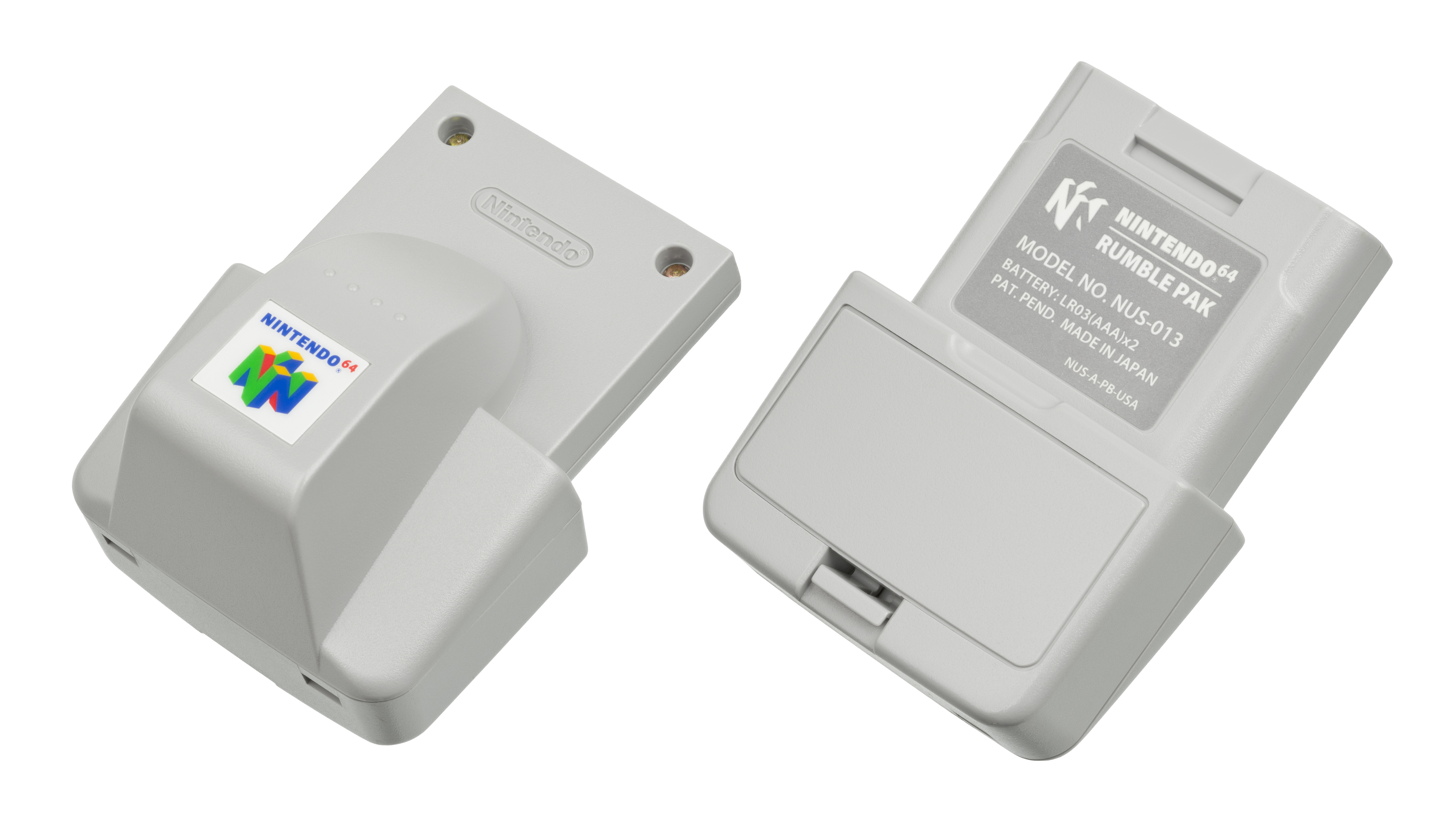
Star Fox 64 was the first title to make use of the Rumble Pak peripheral.

Star Fox 64 was the first game to use the Rumble Pak peripheral, which came bundled with some copies. Miyamoto said that the development team struggled to use the Rumble Pak in a way that players understood, noting that during development, players were often confused as to why their controller was vibrating. Another concern the development team had was developing in-game cut-scenes that reflected the visuals of actual gameplay, in contrast to PlayStation releases at the time featuring pre-rendered cutscenes completely different from actual gameplay.

== Release ==
Star Fox 64 was first shown publicly at E3 1996, where Nintendo released a video of an early version. This showcased only the first level (Corneria) and featured a minimalistic HUD, showing only a crude meter reflecting the player's shield gauge. Nintendo released further beta footage on December 6, 1996, that showed subsequent levels, an improved HUD, and a short multiplayer segment.

As with its predecessor (which was titled Starwing in PAL regions), Nintendo was concerned that the Star Fox name was too similar to the name of the German company StarVox. To avoid a potential lawsuit, the game was rebranded as Lylat Wars in certain PAL territories. Nintendo Power subscribers received a promotional video prior to Star Fox 64's release (the same tactic was used to promote Donkey Kong Country for the SNES as well as Diddy Kong Racing, Banjo-Kazooie, and Hey You, Pikachu! for the Nintendo 64) that advertised the cinematic presentation, as well as new features like the Rumble Pak and voice acting. It revolves around two agents of Sega and Sony (who at the time were Nintendo's biggest hardware competitors) interrogating Nintendo employees into revealing information. The game reportedly had a marketing budget of $7 million.

Miyamoto said that while he was not 100% satisfied with the final version of Star Fox 64, he felt it made better use of the Nintendo 64 than Super Mario 64, which he had also developed. An unofficial PC port, StarShip, developed by the team behind the Ship of Harkinian port of The Legend of Zelda: Ocarina of Time, was released in December 2024.

== Reception ==
Reception

Aggregate scores
Aggregator	Score
GameRankings	89.01%
Metacritic	88/100

Review scores
Publication	Score
Edge	9/10
Electronic Gaming Monthly	9/10, 9.5/10, 9/10, 9/10
Famitsu	9/10, 9/10, 9/10, 9/10
GameSpot	8.3/10
IGN	8.7/10
N64 Magazine	94% (JP); 90% (PAL)
Next Generation	4/5
Nintendo Life	9/10
64 Extreme	95/100

Star Fox 64 received acclaim and was one of the top-selling games of 1997, second to Mario Kart 64. Reviews hailed the level branching system, particularly its use of player performance and secret in-level triggers rather than simple path selection. Many reviewers also praised the multiplayer modes as an ample source of replay value. However, Crispin Boyer of Electronic Gaming Monthly (EGM) considered them a waste, contending that the split screen display made targets too small to pinpoint. The game's voice clips were widely complimented, not for the quality of the acting, but for the unprecedented quantity of audio clips for a cartridge-based game. Critics also applauded the precise analog control, boss designs, Rumble Pak implementation, and cinematic cutscenes. GamePro gave it five out of five in all four categories, praising the gameplay, graphics, controls, and fun factor.

The most common criticism was that Star Fox 64 was not as much of a leap over the original Star Fox as Super Mario 64 was over previous Mario games, in particular that the gameplay was still on rails. GameSpot reviewer Glenn Rubenstein declared Star Fox 64 "an instant classic" and "a pleasure to look at". EGM gave it their "Game of the Month" award, with Dan Hsu calling it "a shooting fan's dream come true" and Shawn Smith "almost as good as Mario 64". IGN reviewer Doug Perry said it "demonstrates that shooters are more alive now than ever".

Alex Navarro of GameSpot praised the Wii Virtual Console version for its simple, enjoyable shooting gameplay, and plentiful voice acting. He described it as nice to look at regardless of its graphic age, with added replay value in finding hidden paths, but found the lack of rumble support "alarming", especially since it was the first game to support the Rumble Pak.

In the first five days of the U.S. launch, more than 300,000 copies were sold, surpassing the record previously held by Mario Kart 64 and Super Mario 64. It was the best-selling home console video game in its first three months of release, and remained within the top ten best-selling video games for the remainder of 1997. It sold above 1 million units in the United States by the end of 1997, one of five Nintendo 64 games to do so. Sales were considerably less in Japan, where it sold 75,595 copies during the first week of sale. The game took the #73 spot in Nintendo Power's "Top 200 Nintendo Games Ever".

Star Fox 64 is listed as the 45th greatest game of all time by Guinness World Records Gamer's Edition in 2009. In 1997 EGM ranked it the 39th best console video game of all time, citing its amazing visuals, huge amount of voice acting, and the deep challenge of earning medals on all stages and completing expert mode. They also named it "Shooter of the Year" at their 1997 Editors' Choice Awards. In 2009, Official Nintendo Magazine named it the 14th-greatest Nintendo game. In 2012, G4 ranked Star Fox 64 as the 74th greatest game of all time on their list of the top 100 greatest video games of all time.

== Remakes and reimaginings ==
On 2011, Nintendo released a remake, Star Fox 64 3D, for the Nintendo 3DS. It was co-developed by Q-Games and features stereoscopic 3D graphics, quality-of-life improvements, gyroscope controls, and new voice recordings. It was the first time that Star Fox 64 had been released in PAL territories under the original Star Fox name.

Star Fox Zero, released in 2016, is another reimagining of Star Fox 64. Though not a strict remake, it reuses many elements from the original story. Many reviewers were divided about the similarity; Ray Carsillo of EGM said that it failed to build on Star Fox 64 in new and exciting ways, and was disappointed by the choice to re-imagine an older game instead of creating a brand new installment. Another remake, Star Fox, was released in 2026 for the Nintendo Switch 2.
