= Star Fox Guard =

2016 video game

- Developers: Nintendo EPD; PlatinumGames
- Publisher: Nintendo
- Series: Star Fox
- Platform: Wii U
- Release: JP: April 21, 2016; NA/EU: April 22, 2016; AU: April 23, 2016
- Genre: Tower defense
- Mode: Single-player

Star Fox Guard (Note: Japanese: スターフォックス ガード, Hepburn: Sutā Fokkusu Gādo) is a 2016 tower defense video game co-developed by Nintendo and PlatinumGames for the Wii U. The game was bundled as a separate disc for the first print edition of Star Fox Zero and as a digital download on the Wii U eShop afterwards.

== Gameplay ==
Star Fox Guard is a 3D tower defense game in which players must protect various bases, owned by Slippy Toad's uncle, Grippy, from oncoming attackers by monitoring security cameras. The television displays footage from all of the available security cameras while the Wii U GamePad features an overhead view of the base. To defend the base's core, players must watch the monitors carefully for any oncoming attackers and switch control to one of the available cameras in order to fire its weapon. Enemies are divided into two classes: Combat robots, which must all be defeated in order to progress; and Chaos robots, which hinder the player by tampering with the cameras, such as obscuring the view or showing fake footage. The game features 100 missions and an editor mode that allows players to edit the behavior of enemies in levels and share them online.

== Development ==
Star Fox Guard was initially shown off as a tech demo called Project Guard by series creator Shigeru Miyamoto at E3 2014. When asked during an interview, Miyamoto confessed that Project Guard was connected to Star Fox somehow. The game was formally revealed as Star Fox Guard during a Nintendo Direct presentation in March 2016.

== Reception ==
Reception

Aggregate score
Aggregator	Score
Metacritic	74/100

Review scores
Publication	Score
Destructoid	6/10
Famitsu	31/40
IGN	7.8/10
Nintendo Life	8/10
Nintendo World Report	7.5/10

Star Fox Guard received mixed reviews, according to review aggregator website Metacritic. Jose Otero from IGN praised its "clever enemies", controls, and extra missions, but criticized the "simple campaign" and "bland graphics". Jonathan Harrington from Nintendo Enthusiast praised its gameplay, variety, and online sharing, but criticized the lack of humor, low budget visuals, and music. Stephen Totilo from Kotaku stated that despite it having "just about nothing to do with the aerial shooting gameplay people associate with Star Fox", it was "one of Nintendo's most distinct games in years".
