= List of Iwata Asks interviews =

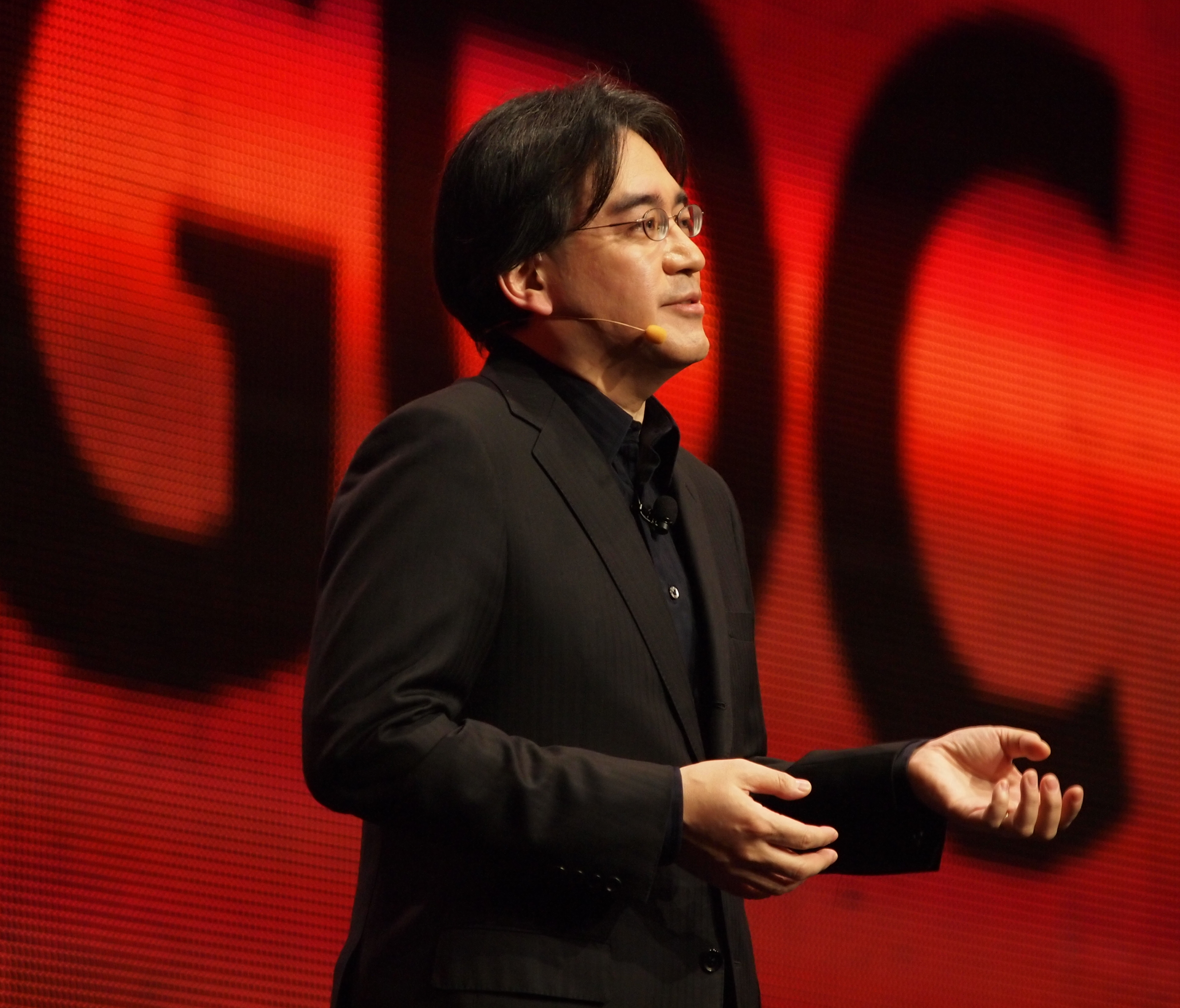
Satoru Iwata at GDC 2011

Iwata Asks (Note: Japanese: 社長が訊く, Hepburn: Shachō ga Kiku; lit. The President Asks) is a series of interviews conducted by former Nintendo president and chief executive officer (CEO) Satoru Iwata from 2006 until his death in 2015. In these interview articles, Iwata discusses with various colleagues select details about Nintendo and other developers' video game titles, hardware, and various aspects of the company. The discussions reveal historical background information on the development of games and hardware as well as the mindset of the creators at the time. Additionally, these interviews often showcase the friendly camaraderie between Iwata and other members of Nintendo as jokes and laughter are shown to be commonplace. They proved to be one of the most insightful collections of information on the development of Nintendo products available. Time's Matt Peckham referred to Iwata Asks as "a remarkable series" and "a Nintendophile's dream come true".

Content from Iwata Asks was featured in a book titled Ask Iwata: Words of Wisdom from Satoru Iwata, published by Hobonichi. The book was first published in 2019 in Japan. An English translation was released in 2021.

A similar series of interviews called Ask the Developer started in 2021.

== List of interviews ==
=== Wii series ===
Topic	Date (Note: All dates are of the original transcription of the interviews on the Japanese Nintendo website.)	Interviewee(s)	Title/Volume	English localization	Ref.
Wii	September 9, 2006	Genyo Takeda, Junji Takamoto, Kenichiro Ashida, Kou Shiota	Wii console	Yes	
Wii	September 11, 2006	Genyo Takeda, Shigeru Miyamoto, Kenichiro Ashida, Akio Ikeda	Wii Remote	Yes	
Wii	September 14, 2006	Takashi Aoyama, Tomoaki Kuroume, Kenichiro Ashida	Wii Channels	Yes	
Wii	October 12, 2006	Katsuya Eguchi, Keizo Ota, Yoshikazu Yamashita, Takayuki Shimamura	Wii Sports	Yes	
Wii	October 26, 2006	Yoshiyuki Oyama, Keisuke Nishimori, Koji Kitagawa, Atsushi Miyagi, Kentaro Tominaga, Aya Kyogoku	The Legend of Zelda: Twilight Princess	Yes	
Wii	November 22, 2006	Yoshio Sakamoto, Goro Abe	WarioWare: Smooth Moves	Yes	
Super Mario Galaxy	October 4, 2007	Yoshiaki Koizumi, Takao Shimizu	The Producer and Director	Yes	
Super Mario Galaxy	October 4, 2007	Kenta Motokura, Futoshi Shirai, Norihiro Aoyagi, Hideaki Shimizu, Koichi Hayashida	The Developers	Yes	
Super Mario Galaxy	October 4, 2007	Masafumi Kawamura, Mahito Yokota, Koji Kondo	The Sound Team	Yes	
Super Mario Galaxy	October 4, 2007	Shigeru Miyamoto	Shigeru Miyamoto	Yes	
Wii Fit	November 8, 2007	Shigeru Miyamoto	A New Creation	Yes	
Wii Fit	November 8, 2007	Takeshi Nagareda, Takao Sawano	The Wii Balance Board	Yes	
Wii Fit	November 8, 2007	Hiroshi Matsunaga, Tadashi Sugiyama	The Wii Fit Software	Yes	
Wii Fit	November 8, 2007	Arisa Hosaka, Mari Shibata, Yoshiyuki Oyama, Yohei Miyagawa, Toru Minegishi	Sound, Design and Planning	Yes	
Super Smash Bros. Brawl	January 30, 2008	Masahiro Sakurai	E3 2005: A Beginning	Yes	
Super Smash Bros. Brawl	January 30, 2008	Masahiro Sakurai	For First-time Gamers	Yes	
Super Smash Bros. Brawl	January 30, 2008	Masahiro Sakurai	Versus, Co-op and Share	Yes	
Super Smash Bros. Brawl	January 30, 2008	Masahiro Sakurai	The Subspace Emissary	Yes	
Super Smash Bros. Brawl	January 30, 2008	Masahiro Sakurai	Plethora of New Features	Yes	
Super Smash Bros. Brawl	January 30, 2008	Masahiro Sakurai	All-star Music	Yes	
Super Smash Bros. Brawl	January 30, 2008	Masahiro Sakurai	Once in a Lifetime Experience	Yes	
Metroid Prime 3: Corruption	February 29, 2008	Risa Tabata, Kensuke Tanabe	—N/a	No	
Mario Kart Wii	April 3, 2008	Shigeru Miyamoto, Kenichiro Ashida, Hideki Konno	—N/a	Yes	
Link's Crossbow Training	April 24, 2008	Shigeru Miyamoto	—N/a	Yes	
Wii Music	September 25, 2008	Shigeru Miyamoto	Shigeru Miyamoto	Yes	
Wii Music	September 25, 2008	Makoto Wada, Junji Morii, Kazumi Totaka	The Developers	Yes	
Wii Music	September 25, 2008	Kazumi Totaka, Koji Kondo, Shigeru Miyamoto	The Developers	Yes	
Animal Crossing: City Folk	November 13, 2008	Aya Kyogoku, Ryuji Kobayashi, Isao Moro, Hisashi Nogami	—N/a	Yes	
Wii MotionPlus	May 18, 2009	Keizo Ota, Kuniaki Ito, Noboru Wakitani, Junji Takamoto	—N/a	Yes	
Wii Sports Resort	June 4, 2009	Yoshikazu Yamashita, Takayuki Shimamura, Takuhiro Dohta, Kenta Sato	—N/a	Yes	
Punch-Out!!	July 13, 2009	Makoto Wada, Kensuke Tanabe, Shigeru Miyamoto, Genyo Takeda	—N/a	Yes	
Monster Hunter Tri	July 30, 2009	Kaname Fujioka, Ryozo Tsujimoto	—N/a	Yes	
Wii Fit Plus	September 29, 2009	Dr. Motohiko Miyachi	Volume 1	Yes	
Wii Fit Plus	September 29, 2009	Dr. Motohiko Miyachi	Volume 2	Yes	
Sin & Punishment: Star Successor	October 22, 2009	Shingo Matsushita, Yurie Hattori, Hitoshi Yamagami, Masato Maegawa, Atsutomo Nakagawa, Yasushi Suzuki	—N/a	Yes	
Final Fantasy Crystal Chronicles: The Crystal Bearers	November 6, 2009	Akitoshi Kawazu	—N/a	No	
New Super Mario Bros. Wii	November 13, 2009	Shigeru Miyamoto	Volume 1	Yes	
New Super Mario Bros. Wii	November 13, 2009	Toshihiko Nakago, Takashi Tezuka	Volume 2	Yes	
New Super Mario Bros. Wii	November 13, 2009	Sanae Uchida, Eiji Mukae, Takayuki Ikkaku, Shigeyuki Asuke	Volume 3	Yes	
Wii no Ma	November 20, 2009	Yusuke Beppu, Masaaki Yukawa, Yoshihiro Suzuki, Tony Ellison	—N/a	No	
NHK Kōhaku Quiz Gassen	December 25, 2009	Kenji Suzuki, Kazue Sugata, Jun'ichi Nogami, Mihoko Ebata, Shin'ya Saitō	—N/a	No	
Zangeki no Reginleiv	February 4, 2010	Hitoshi Yamagami, Takehiro Honma, Masatsugu Igarashi, Toshio Noguchi, Kazuhiro Yoshikawa	—N/a	No	
Andō Kensaku	April 22, 2010	Han Gang, Kentarō Nishimura, Kentarō Soya, Yōichi Yui	—N/a	No	
Super Mario Galaxy 2	May 11, 2010	Shigeru Miyamoto	Volume 1	Yes	
Super Mario Galaxy 2	May 11, 2010	Kenta Motokura, Takeshi Hayakawa (mistranslated as Kenzo Hayakawa), Kōichi Hayashida, Yoshiaki Koizumi	Volume 2	Yes	
Super Mario Galaxy 2	May 11, 2010	Ryo Nagamatsu, Mahito Yokota, Koji Kondo	Volume 3	Yes	
Xenoblade Chronicles	May 19, 2010	Tetsuya Takahashi, Yoko Shimomura, Yasunori Mitsuda, Manami Kiyota, ACE+ (Chico), Tomori Kudo, Kenji Hiramatsu	Sound	Yes	
Xenoblade Chronicles	May 19, 2010	Tetsuya Takahashi, Yuichiro Takeda	Story	Yes	
Xenoblade Chronicles	May 19, 2010	Yurie Hattori, Genki Yokota, Hitoshi Yamagami, Koh Kojima, Tetsuya Takahashi	The Development Process	Yes	
Metroid: Other M	July 29, 2010	Ryuzi Kitaura, Yosuke Hayashi, Yoshio Sakamoto	The Collaboration	Yes	
Metroid: Other M	July 29, 2010	Takehiko Hosokawa, Takayasu Morisawa, Hidekatsu Nagasawa, Yutaka Saito, Taiyo Aramaki, Kazutaka Otsuka, Ryo Koike	Development Staff	Yes	
Wii Party	August 5, 2010	Hiroshi Sato, Miyuki Hirose, Shuichiro Nishiya, Atsushi Ikeda	—N/a	Yes	
The Last Story	August 17, 2010	Hironobu Sakaguchi	—N/a	Yes	
Kirby's Epic Yarn	October 7, 2010	Emi Watanabe, Nobuo Matsumiya, Atsushi Kono, Kentaro Sei, Etsunobu Ebisu	—N/a	Yes	
Super Mario All-Stars	October 21, 2010	Ryo Nagamatsu, Mahito Yokota, Koji Kondo	The Music	Yes	
Super Mario All-Stars	October 21, 2010	Naoki Mori, Tadashi Sugiyama	The Developers	Yes	
Donkey Kong Country Returns	December 1, 2010	Kynan Pearson, Mike Wikan, Tom Ivey, Kensuke Tanabe, Risa Tabata	—N/a	Yes	
Pandora's Tower	May 23, 2011	Chikako Yamakura, Toru Hoga, Hirofumi Irie, Takao Nakano, Hitoshi Yamagami	—N/a	Yes	
Wii Play: Motion	June 30, 2011	Toyokazu Nonaka, Etsunobu Ebisu, Yuichi Mizobe, Hirosato Funaki, Ryusuke Niitani, Takehiko Hosokawa, Keita Eto, Jun Taniguchi, Yuji Naka, Naoto Ohshima, Shinya Takahashi	—N/a	Yes	
Rhythm Heaven Fever	July 20, 2011	Takafumi Masaoka, Masami Yone, Ko Takeuchi, Mitsuo Terada, Koji Kamada, Hiroshi Iida	—N/a	Yes	
The Legend of Zelda: Skyward Sword	October 18, 2011	Eiji Aonuma, Hidemaro Fujibayashi, Ryuji Kobayashi, Ryo Tanaka	Wii MotionPlus Inspires New Controls	Yes	
The Legend of Zelda: Skyward Sword	October 18, 2011	Haruyasu Ito, Yutaka Hiramuki, Shigeyuki Asuke, Hidemaro Fujibayashi	The Dense Forest	Yes	
The Legend of Zelda: Skyward Sword	October 18, 2011	Yoshiyuki Oyama, Takafumi Kiuchi, Kentaro Tominaga, Hidemaro Fujibayashi	The Dense Volcano and Enemy Monsters	Yes	
The Legend of Zelda: Skyward Sword	October 18, 2011	Koji Kitagawa, Yohei Fujino, Hiromu Takemura, Hidemaro Fujibayashi	The Dense Desert and New System	Yes	
The Legend of Zelda: Skyward Sword	October 18, 2011	Masato Mizuta, Hanako Hisada, Daiki Iwamoto, Eiji Aonuma, Hidemaro Fujibayashi	The Dense Sky and Town	Yes	
The Legend of Zelda: Skyward Sword	October 18, 2011	Shigeki Yoshida, Hajime Yakai, Naoki Mori, Hidemaro Fujibayashi, Eiji Aonuma	The Dense Script and Direction	Yes	
The Legend of Zelda: Skyward Sword	October 18, 2011	Hanako Hisada, Tomomi Marunami, Tomomi Iwasaki, Akiko Hirono, Arisa Hosaka	Female Staff	Yes	
The Legend of Zelda: Skyward Sword	October 18, 2011	Eiji Aonuma	Those Who Played The Legend of Zelda: Skyward Sword for Hundreds of Hours	Yes	
Go Vacation	October 20, 2011	Masaya Kobayashi, Yozo Sakagami	—N/a	Yes	
Kirby's Return to Dream Land	October 21, 2011	Shigefumi Kawase, Shinya Kumazaki, Hiroaki Nakano, Tadashi Kimitake	—N/a	Yes	
Mario & Sonic at the London 2012 Olympic Games	December 6, 2011	Emi Watanabe, Tomoyoshi Yamane, Eigo Kasahara, Osamu Ohashi	—N/a	Yes	
Kiki Trick	December 27, 2011	Noriyuki Sato, Yoshio Sakamoto, Shinichi Sakamoto	—N/a	No	
Project Zero 2: Wii Edition	April 5, 2012	Keisuke Kikuchi, Makoto Shibata	—N/a	Yes	
Dragon Quest X	July 23, 2012	Jin Fujisawa, Yosuke Saito, Yuji Horii	—N/a	No	

=== Nintendo DS series ===
Topic	Date	Interviewee(s)	Title/Volume	English localization	Ref.
Jam with the Band	June 11, 2008	Shinji Kitahara, Noriko Kitamura, Koichi Kyuma	Volume 1	Yes	
Jam with the Band	September 2008	Masaru Nishita, Noriko Kitamura	Volume 2	Yes	
Rhythm Heaven	July 11, 2008	Kyohei Seki, Takafumi Masaoka, Masami Yone, Ko Takeuchi, Kazuyoshi Osawa		Yes	
Rhythm Heaven	July 11, 2008	Tsunku		No	
Style Savvy	October 17, 2008	Norihito Ito, Yurie Hattori, Hitoshi Yamagami, Azusa Tajima	—N/a	Yes	
Nintendo DSi console	October 24, 2008	Yui Ehara, Kentaro Mita, Masato Kuwahara	Hardware	Yes	
Nintendo DSi console	October 24, 2008	Shigeru Miyamoto, Yusuke Akifusa, Masahiro Imaizumi, Yoshihiro Matsushima, Tomoaki Kuroume	Internal Software	Yes	
Nintendo DSi console	October 24, 2008	Satoshi Furukawa, Eiichi Shirakawa, Shinya Takahashi	Browser	Yes	
Nintendo DSi console	October 24, 2008	Taku Sugioka, Naoko Mori, Goro Abe	Wario Ware: Snapped!	Yes	
Nintendo DSi console	October 24, 2008	Koichi Kawamoto, Shinya Takahashi	Brain Age Express	Yes	
Nintendo DSi console	October 24, 2008	Hideaki Shimizu, Yoshiaki Koizumi, Junya Kondo, Yeppei Ninomiya	Flipnote Studio	Yes	
Nintendo DSi console	October 24, 2008	Yoichi Kotabe, Shigeru Miyamoto, Yoshiaki Koizumi	Yoichi Kotabe	Yes	
Personal Trainer: Walking	October 27, 2008	Masaru Shimomura, Kiyoshi Mizuki, Naoya Morimura, Noriko Akita	—N/a	Yes	
WarioWare D.I.Y.	April 22, 2009	Taku Sugioka, Takumi Hatakeyama, Goro Abe	—N/a	Yes	
Tomodachi Collection	June 11, 2009	Masanori Nakagawa, Daisuke Shiiba, Ryutaro Takahashi	—N/a	No	
Dragon Quest IX	July 3, 2009	Yuji Horii, Koichi Sugiyama	—N/a	No	
Mono ya Okane no Shikumi DS	August 20, 2009	Shinya Takahashi, Toshiaki Suzuki, Kanako Tsugihashi, Shinji Kitahara		No	
Mono ya Okane no Shikumi DS	August 20, 2009	Naruko Kodama, Hirotsugu Nagao, Michio Sakamura		No	
Pokémon HeartGold and SoulSilver	September 4, 2009	Shigeki Morimoto, Tsunekazu Ishihara	—N/a	Yes	
The Legend of Zelda: Spirit Tracks	November 19, 2009	Eiji Aonuma, Daiki Iwamoto	The Legend of Zelda: Spirit Tracks	Yes	
The Legend of Zelda: Spirit Tracks	November 19, 2009	Toshihiko Nakago, Takashi Tezuka, Eiji Aonuma	The History of Handheld The Legend of Zelda Games	Yes	
Nintendo DSi XL	December 14, 2009	Takaki Fujino, Masaki Amano, Masato Kuwahara, Kazuo Yoneyama	—N/a	Yes	
Fire Emblem: New Mystery of the Emblem	July 14, 2010	Kouhei Maeda, Masahiro Higuchi, Toru Narihiro	—N/a	No	
Pokémon Black and White	September 10, 2010	Tsunekazu Ishihara, Junichi Masuda, Ken Sugimori	—N/a	Yes	
Jibun Detsukuru: Nintendo DS Guide	November 17, 2010	Shigeru Miyamoto, Takao Shimizu, Takao Sawano, Kenji Nishizawa	—N/a	No	
Eigo de Tabisuru: Little Charo	January 19, 2011	Risa Junna, Shinichi Nagano	—N/a	No	
Learn with Pokémon: Typing Adventure	April 22, 2011	Masato Kuwahara, Daisuke Fukumoto, Masahiko Ota		No	
Learn with Pokémon: Typing Adventure	April 22, 2011	Manabu Yamana, Tsunekazu Ishihara, Kaori Ando		No	
Pokémon Black 2 and White 2	June 14, 2012	Junichi Masuda, Takao Unno, Tsunekazu Ishihara	—N/a	Yes	

=== Nintendo 3DS series ===
Topic	Date	Interviewee(s)	Title/Volume	English localization	Ref.
Nintendo 3DS	January 7, 2011	Shigeru Miyamoto, Shigesato Itoi	And That's How the Nintendo 3DS Was Made	Yes	
Nintendo 3DS	January 27, 2011	Kenichi Sugino, Ryuji Umezu, Hideki Konno	Hardware Concept	Yes	
Nintendo 3DS	February 3, 2011	Junichiro Miyatake, Yui Ehara, Hironori Akai, Hiroki Goto, Kazunori Koshiishi	Exterior and Mechanical Design	Yes	
Nintendo 3DS	February 8, 2011	Hideki Konno, Shigeru Miyamoto	Nintendogs + Cats	Yes	
Nintendo 3DS	February 25, 2011	Shigeru Miyamoto	Asking Mr. Miyamoto Right Before Release	Yes	
Nintendo 3DS	March 10, 2011	Kiyoshi Mizuki, Toshiaki Suzuki, Kouichi Kawamoto, Yusuke Akifusa, Ryutaro Takahashi, Tomoaki Kuroume	Built-in Software	Yes	
Third Party Developers	February 10, 2011	Akihiro Hino	Professor Layton and the Miracle Mask	Yes	
Third Party Developers	February 15, 2011	Hisashi Koinuma	Samurai Warriors: Chronicles	Yes	
Third Party Developers	February 17, 2011	Shinji Enomoto	Pro Evolution Soccer 2011 3D	Yes	
Third Party Developers	February 22, 2011	Yozo Sakagami	Ridge Racer 3D	Yes	
Third Party Developers	February 24, 2011	Yoshinori Ono	Super Street Fighter IV: 3D Edition	Yes	
Third Party Developers	April 27, 2011	Akari Uchida	New LovePlus	No	
Third Party Developers	May 12, 2011	Yosuke Hayashi	Dead or Alive: Dimensions	Yes	
Third Party Developers	May 19, 2011	Masachika Kawata	Resident Evil: The Mercenaries 3D; Resident Evil: Revelations	Yes	
Third Party Developers	June 23, 2011	Makoto Yoshizumi	Tales of the Abyss	Yes	
Third Party Developers	December 5, 2011	Kaname Fujioka, Ryozo Tsujimoto	Monster Hunter 3 Ultimate	No	
Third Party Developers	January 19, 2012	Masachika Kawata, Koshi Nakanishi, Kota Suzuki, Tsukasa Takenaka, Yoshizumi Hori	Resident Evil: Revelations	Yes	
Third Party Developers	February 9, 2012	Katsuhiro Harada, Kouhei Ikeda	Tekken 3D: Prime Edition	Yes	
Third Party Developers	February 13, 2012	Ichiro Hazama	Theatrhythm Final Fantasy	Yes	
Third Party Developers	February 28, 2012	Hiroshi Utsumi, Motoshi Takabe, Makoto Osaki	Hatsune Miku and Future Stars: Project Mirai	No	
Third Party Developers	April 3, 2012	Tetsuya Nomura	Kingdom Hearts 3D: Dream Drop Distance	Yes	
Third Party Developers	April 26, 2012	Kenichi Ogasawara	Shin Sangoku Musou VS	No	
Third Party Developers	May 17, 2012	Taichi Inuzuka, Yuji Horii	Dragon Quest Monsters: Terry's Wonderland 3D	No	
Third Party Developers	June 12, 2012	Daisuke Kanada, Shigeo Komori	Etrian Odyssey IV	No	
Third Party Developers	June 28, 2012	Yoshifumi Hashimoto	Rune Factory 4	No	
Third Party Developers	September 18, 2012	Naotaka Hayashi, Tomoya Asano	Bravely Default	No	
Third Party Developers	October 10, 2012	Takaharu Terada, Kazuhiro Tsuchiya, Soichiro Morizumi, Kensuke Tsukanaka	Project X Zone	No	
Third Party Developers	October 25, 2012	Yasuhiro Anpo, Shintaro Kojima	E.X. Troopers	No	
Third Party Developers	November 22, 2012	Shu Takumi, Akihiro Hino	Professor Layton vs. Phoenix Wright: Ace Attorney	Yes	
Third Party Developers	January 31, 2013	Sachiko Sugimura, Shintaro Majima, Noriyoshi Fujimoto, Yuji Horii	Dragon Quest VII	No	
Steel Diver	May 10, 2011	Giles Goddard, Takaya Imamura, Tadashi Sugiyama, Shigeru Miyamoto	—N/a	Yes	
The Legend of Zelda: Ocarina of Time 3D The Legend of Zelda: Ocarina of Time	May 26, 2011	Mahito Yokota, Koji Kondo	Sound	Yes	
The Legend of Zelda: Ocarina of Time 3D The Legend of Zelda: Ocarina of Time	May 26, 2011	Toshio Iwawaki, Eiji Aonuma, Takumi Kawagoe, Yoshiaki Koizumi, Toru Osawa	Original Development Staff Part 1	Yes	
The Legend of Zelda: Ocarina of Time 3D The Legend of Zelda: Ocarina of Time	May 26, 2011	Kazuaki Morita, Makoto Miyanaga, Satoru Takizawa, Yoshiki Haruhana, Eiji Aonuma	Original Development Staff Part 2	Yes	
The Legend of Zelda: Ocarina of Time 3D The Legend of Zelda: Ocarina of Time	May 26, 2011	Eiji Aonuma, Takao Shimizu, Nagako Ikuta, Shun Moriya, Takashi Tonooka, Koichi Ishii	Development Staff	Yes	
The Legend of Zelda: Ocarina of Time 3D The Legend of Zelda: Ocarina of Time	May 26, 2011	Shigeru Miyamoto	Mr. Shigeru Miyamoto	Yes	
Nintendo eShop	June 6, 2011	Kenta Tanaka, Takao Nakano, Daiji Imai, Kazuto Nakaya	—N/a	Yes	
Star Fox 64 3D	July 5, 2011	Mitsuhiro Takano, Tusuke Amano, Dylan Cuthbert, Shigeru Miyamoto	—N/a	Yes	
Pokédex 3D	August 9, 2011	Tsunekazu Ishihara, Hiroyuki Ogasawara, Rie Takeuchi, Katsunori Orimoto	Pokédex 3D	Yes	
Pokédex 3D	August 9, 2011	Tsunekazu Ishihara, Muneaki Ozawa, Norio Matsumura	Pokémon Rumble Blast	Yes	
Hana to Ikimono Rittai Zukan	September 22, 2011	Shinji Kitahara, Kanako Tsugihashi, Toshiaki Suzuki, Shinya Takahashi	—N/a	No	
Hana to Ikimono Rittai Zukan	September 22, 2011	Naruko Kodama, Hirotsugu Nagao, Michio Sakamura	—N/a	No	
Mario Kart 7	October 21, 2011	Hideki Konno	Nintendo Direct	Yes	
Mario Kart 7	November 25, 2011	Tom Ivey, Vince Joly, Ryan Powell, Yuji Ichijo, Masaaki Ishikawa, Yoshihisa Morimoto, Hideki Konno	Joint Development with Retro Studios	Yes	
Mario Kart 7	November 25, 2011	Kenta Nagata, Yusuke Shiraiwa, Kosuke Yabuki, Hideki Konno	In-house Staff	Yes	
Super Mario 3D Land	October 27, 2011	Daisuke Tsujimura, Hideyuki Sugawara, Kenta Motokura, Koichi Hayashida	Super Mario 3D Land	Yes	
Super Mario 3D Land	October 27, 2011	Koichi Hayashida, Yoshiaki Koizumi, Takashi Tezuka, Shigeru Miyamoto	The Producers	Yes	
Freakyforms		Kensuke Tanabe, Hiroshi Moriyama	—N/a	Yes	
Spirit Camera: The Cursed Memoir	December 27, 2011	Kozo Makino, Toshiharu Izuno, Keisuke Kikuchi	—N/a	Yes	
Swapnote	January 26, 2012	Yu Kitai, Daiji Imai, Motomasa Kondo, Satoshi Takenouchi	—N/a	Yes	
Kid Icarus: Uprising	February 22, 2012	Masahiro Sakurai	—N/a	Yes	
Fire Emblem Awakening	March 21, 2012	Tohru Narihiro, Masahiro Higuchi, Kouhei Maeda, Toshiyuki Kusakihara, Kozaki Yusuke, Genki Yokota, Hitoshi Yamagami	—N/a	Yes	
Culdcept	April 24, 2012	Shinya Saito, Kohei Takeshige, Hideo Suzuki	—N/a	No	
Nintendo Pocket Football Club	May 30, 2012	Hiroyuki Sonobe		Yes	
Nintendo Pocket Football Club	May 30, 2012	Hiroyuki Sonobe		No	
Brain Age: Concentration Training	July 18, 2012	Dr. Ryuta Kawashima	Volume 1	Yes	
Brain Age: Concentration Training	July 18, 2012	Yuichiro Ito, Noriko Kitamura, Kouichi Kawamoto, Shinya Takahashi	Volume 2	Yes	
Nintendo 3DS XL	July 20, 2012	Junichiro Miyatake, Kumpei Fujita, Takashi Murakami, Shoya Tanaka, Kazunori Koshiishi	—N/a	Yes	
New Super Mario Bros. 2	July 24, 2012	Masaaki Ishikawa, Yusuke Amano	—N/a	Yes	
HarmoKnight	August 29, 2012	Shigeru Ohmori, James Turner, Junichi Masuda	—N/a	Yes	
Art Academy: Lessons for Everyone!	September 6, 2012	Yuji Ichijo, Kaori Miyachi, Keisuke Terasaki, Jason Howard, Trancred Dyke-Wells	—N/a	Yes	
Style Savvy: Trendsetters	October 22, 2012	Hiromasa Tsujii, Koji Tamura, Shun Sasaki, Yurie Hattori, Hitoshi Yamagami	—N/a	Yes	
Animal Crossing: New Leaf	October 31, 2012	Koji Takahashi, Isao Moro, Aya Kyogoku	—N/a	Yes	
Pokémon Mystery Dungeon: Gates to Infinity	November 15, 2012	Shin-ichiro Tomie, Seiichiro Nagahata, Tsunekazu Ishihara	—N/a	Yes	
Paper Mario: Sticker Star	November 29, 2012	Kensuke Tanabe, Shingo Igata, Naohiko Aoyama, Kenji Nakajima, Tare Kudo	—N/a	Yes	
Luigi's Mansion: Dark Moon	March 22, 2013	Chad York, Bryce Holliday, Brian Davis, Shigeru Miyamoto, Yoshihito Ikebata	—N/a	Yes	
Tomodachi Life	April 11, 2013	Mai Okamoto, Eisaku Nakae, Ryutaro Takahashi, Yoshio Sakamoto	—N/a	No	
Mario & Luigi: Dream Team	July 2, 2013	Tomomi Sano, Akira Otani, Hiroyuki Kubota, Yoshihiko Maekawa	—N/a	Yes	
StreetPass Relay Points	September 6, 2013	Masayoshi Matsuoka, Yusuke Inoue, Taisuke Kawahara, Masatoshi Yamazaki, Hideki Konno	—N/a	Yes	
Pokémon X and Y	October 10, 2013	Junichi Masuda, Tsunezaku Ishihara	—N/a	Yes	
The Legend of Zelda: A Link Between Worlds	November 19, 2013	Koji Takahashi, Kentaro Tominaga, Shiro Mouri, Hiromasa Shikata, Eiji Aonuma	—N/a	Yes	
Nintendo 3DS Guide: Louvre	November 27, 2013	Shigeru Miyamoto	—N/a	Yes	
The Legend of Zelda: Majora's Mask 3D	February 13, 2015	Tomomi Sano, Tomohiro Yamamura, Eiji Aonuma, Mikiharu Ooiwa	—N/a	Yes	
Xenoblade Chronicles 3D	March 27, 2015	Tetsuya Takahashi	—N/a	Yes	
Rhythm Heaven Megamix	June 11, 2015	Tsunku	—N/a	No	
Fire Emblem Fates	June 24, 2015	Hitoshi Yamagami, Genki Yokota, Shin Kibayashi, Kouhei Maeda, Masahiro Higuchi	—N/a	Yes	

=== Wii U series ===
Topic	Date	Interviewee(s)	Title/Volume	English localization	Ref.
Wii U console	October 11, 2012	Nobuyuki Akagi, Yasuhisa Kitano, Ko Shiota, Genyo Takeda	—N/a	Yes	
Wii U GamePad	October 17, 2012	Tat Iwamoto, Masato Ibuki, Kenichi Mae, Kuniaki Ito, Toru Yamashita	—N/a	Yes	
Miiverse	November 7, 2012	Junya Kondo, Kiyoshi Mizuki	The Producers	Yes	
Miiverse	November 8, 2012	Kazuyuki Motoyama, Yoshiomi Kurisu, Shunsaku Kato, Hideto Yuzawa	The Developers	Yes	
Internet Browser	November 9, 2012	Munetaka Tsuda, Tetsuya Sasaki	—N/a	Yes	
Wii U Chat	November 12, 2012	Fumihiko Tamiya, Atsushi Watanabe	—N/a	Yes	
New Super Mario Bros. U	November 16, 2012	Shigeyuki Asuke, Daiki Iwamoto, Masataka Takemoto	—N/a	Yes	
ZombiU	November 27, 2012	Gabrielle Shrager, Guillaume Brunier, Xavier Poix, Yves Guillemot	—N/a	Yes	
Nintendo x Wii Karaoke U	December 4, 2012	Yurie Hattori, Hitoshi Yamagami, Kazunori Ikami, Yukio Nakatani, Yuuki Yoshimitsu	—N/a	No	
Nintendo Land	December 7, 2012	Tsubasa Sakaguchi, Yoshikazu Yamashita, Takayuki Shimamura, Katsuya Eguchi	—N/a	Yes	
Nintendo TVii (Note: Although this segment was not localized, Nintendo of America produced their own version with the company's president, Reggie Fils-Aimé, as the interviewer.)	December 11, 2012	Yoji Kamikawa, Hirodoku Oda	—N/a	No	
Wii Street U	February 7, 2013	Shinya Takahashi, Toshiaki Suzuki, Hiroshi Ohashi, Kei Kawai	—N/a	Yes	
Game & Wario	March 28, 2013	Naoko Mori, Goro Abe, Yoshio Sakamoto	—N/a	Yes	
Dragon Quest X	March 29, 2013	Jin Fujisawa, Yosuke Saito	—N/a	No	
New Super Luigi U	July 4, 2013	Masataka Takemoto, Takashi Tezuka	—N/a	Yes	
The Wonderful 101	August 11, 2013	Hideki Kamiya	Hideki Kamiya	Yes	
The Wonderful 101	August 11, 2013	Hitoshi Yamagami, Shingo Matsushita, Atsushi Inaba, Hideki Kamiya	Development Staff	Yes	
The Legend of Zelda: The Wind Waker HD	September 18, 2013	Masanao Arimoto, Takuhiro Dohta, Satoru Takizawa, Daiki Iwamoto, Eiji Aonuma	—N/a	Yes	
Wii Sports Club	October 29, 2013	Ryunosuke Suzuki, Kozo Makino, Takayuki Shimamura	—N/a	Yes	
Super Mario 3D World	November 14, 2013	Yoshiaki Koizumi, Koichi Hayashida, Kenta Motokura, Shigeru Miyamoto	—N/a	Yes	
Fit Meter	December 6, 2013	Yugo Hayashi, Hiroshi Matsunaga, Tadashi Sugiyama, Tadaharu Kitado, Nozomu Tooyama	—N/a	Yes	
Xenoblade Chronicles X	April 28, 2015	Genki Yokota, Koh Kojima, Kazuho Hyodo, Yuichiro Takeda, Tetsuya Takahashi	—N/a	Yes	
Splatoon	May 21, 2015	Shintaro Sato, Seita Inoue, Tsubasa Sakaguchi, Yusuke Amano, Hisashi Nogami	—N/a	Yes	

=== Other interviews and specials ===
Topic	Date	Interviewer(s)	Interviewee(s)	Title/Volume	English localization	Ref.
Iwata Asks	October 5, 2006	Yasuhiro Nagata	Satoru Iwata	Turning the Tables: Asking Iwata	Yes	
Fire Emblem: Shadow Dragon	August 1, 2008	Masahiro Sakurai	Toru Narihiro	—N/a	Yes	
Nintendo DSi		Yasuhiro Nagata	Satoru Iwata	Turning the Tables: Asking Iwata	Yes	
Game & Watch	April 15, 2010	Satoru Iwata	Masao Yamamoto, Makoto Kano, Takehiro Izushi	—N/a	Yes	
Nintendo Wi-Fi Connection	October 15, 2008	Satoru Iwata	Takashi Aoyama, Yosuke Hatayama, Kazuhiro Fujiwara	—N/a	No	
Game Seminar 2008	January 26, 2009	Satoru Iwata	Katsuya Eguchi, Hisashi Nogami	Animal Crossing	No	
Game Seminar 2009	January 15, 2010	Satoru Iwata, Shigeru Miyamoto	Takahashi Ryutaro, Mai Okamoto, Asuka Ito, Hatahan Umino	Tomodachi Collection	No	
Wii · DS software you are looking Guide	January 22, 2010	Satoru Iwata	Shinji Hatano, Toshiro Takeuchi, Yuko Oda, Yuzuru Sakai	—N/a	No	
E3 2010	June 16, 2010	Satoru Iwata	Shigeru Miyamoto	Nintendo 3DS	Yes	
E3 2010	June 16, 2010	Satoru Iwata	Hideki Konno	Nintendo 3DS	Yes	
E3 2010	June 16, 2010	Satoru Iwata	Masahiro Sakurai	Kid Icarus: Uprising	Yes	
E3 2010	June 16, 2010	Satoru Iwata	Hideki Konno	Nintendogs + Cats	Yes	
E3 2010	June 16, 2010	Satoru Iwata	Eiji Aonuma, Shigeru Miyamoto	The Legend of Zelda: Skyward Sword	No	
E3 2010	June 16, 2010	Satoru Iwata	Warren Spector	Epic Mickey	Yes	
E3 2010	June 17, 2010	Satoru Iwata	Kensuke Tanabe	Donkey Kong Country Returns	No	
Wii Games	August 26, 2010	Satoru Iwata	Hironobu Sakaguchi, Yoshio Sakamoto	Hironobu Sakaguchi × Yoshio Sakamoto	Yes	
Super Mario 25th Anniversary	September 13, 2010	Shigesato Itoi	Shigeru Miyamoto	Shigesato Itoi Asks in Place of Iwata	Yes	
Super Mario 25th Anniversary	September 13, 2010	Satoru Iwata	Masayuki Uemura, Hiroshi Imanishi	NES & Mario	Yes	
Super Mario 25th Anniversary	September 13, 2010	Satoru Iwata	Yoshiaki Koizumi, Hiroyuki Kimura, Hideki Konno, Katsuya Eguchi	Super Mario Developers	Yes	
Super Mario 25th Anniversary	September 13, 2010	Satoru Iwata	Shiho Fujii, Ryuhei Matsuura, Keiichiro Yoshida, Sayaka Nishimura, Yusuke Amano	Super Mario Developers 2	Yes	
Super Mario 25th Anniversary	September 13, 2010	Satoru Iwata	Toshihiko Nakago, Koji Kondo, Yakashi Tezuka, Shigeru Miyamoto	Original Super Mario Developers	Yes	
Game development	January 25, 2011	Satoru Iwata	Hironobu Sakaguchi, Tetsuya Takahashi	In Conversation with Takahashi & Sakaguchi	Yes	
The Legend of Zelda 25th Anniversary	November 10, 2011	Satoru Iwata	Shigesato Itoi, Shigeru Miyamoto	Creative Small Talk	Yes	
Wii U	June 8, 2011	Satoru Iwata	Shigeru Miyamoto	E3 2011: Wii U	Yes	
Nintendo TVii (Note: This special was produced by Nintendo of America and differs from the original Nintendo TVii segment of Iwata Asks.)	December 20, 2012	Reggie Fils-Aimé	Zach Fountain, Masaki Okahata, Brad Pelo	Reggie Asks	Yes	
PlatinumGames	January 25, 2013	Satoru Iwata	Atsushi Inaba, Tatsuya Minami	—N/a	Yes	
Nintendo European Research & Development	May 21, 2013	Satoru Iwata	Jérôme Larrieu, Alexandre Delattre	—N/a	Yes	

== Ask the Developer ==
Ask the Developer is a series of interviews with Nintendo developers so they can "convey in their own words Nintendo's thoughts about creating products and the specific points they are particular about", similarly to Iwata Asks. The first entry to Ask the Developer was published on July 1, 2021 for the Nintendo Switch game Game Builder Garage.

Volume	Topic	Date	Interviewee(s)	Part/Chapter	Ref.
1	Game Builder Garage	July 1, 2021	Kosuke Teshima, Naoki Masuda	Parts 1-3	
2	Nintendo Switch - OLED model	October 7, 2021	Ko Shiota, Toru Yamashita	Part 1	
2	Nintendo Switch - OLED model	October 7, 2021	Ko Shiota, Toru Yamashita	Part 2	
2	Nintendo Switch - OLED model	October 7, 2021	Ko Shiota, Toru Yamashita	Part 3	
2	Nintendo Switch - OLED model	October 7, 2021	Ko Shiota, Toru Yamashita	Part 4	
3	Big Brain Academy: Brain vs. Brain	December 2, 2021	Kenta Kubo, Tomoaki Yoshinobu, Hideki Fujii	Part 1	
3	Big Brain Academy: Brain vs. Brain	December 2, 2021	Kenta Kubo, Tomoaki Yoshinobu, Hideki Fujii	Part 2	
3	Big Brain Academy: Brain vs. Brain	December 2, 2021	Kenta Kubo, Tomoaki Yoshinobu, Hideki Fujii	Part 3	
4	Kirby and the Forgotten Land	March 24, 2022	Kei Ninomiya, Shinya Kumazaki, Tatsuya Kamiyama, Yuki Endo	Part 1	
4	Kirby and the Forgotten Land	March 24, 2022	Kei Ninomiya, Shinya Kumazaki, Tatsuya Kamiyama, Yuki Endo	Part 2	
4	Kirby and the Forgotten Land	March 24, 2022	Kei Ninomiya, Shinya Kumazaki, Tatsuya Kamiyama, Yuki Endo	Part 3	
4	Kirby and the Forgotten Land	March 24, 2022	Kei Ninomiya, Shinya Kumazaki, Tatsuya Kamiyama, Yuki Endo	Part 4	
5	Nintendo Switch Sports	May 26, 2022	Takayuki Shimamura, Yoshikazu Yamashita, Junji Morii, Shinji Okane, Natsuko Yokoyama	Part 1	
5	Nintendo Switch Sports	May 26, 2022	Takayuki Shimamura, Yoshikazu Yamashita, Junji Morii, Shinji Okane, Natsuko Yokoyama	Part 2	
5	Nintendo Switch Sports	May 26, 2022	Takayuki Shimamura, Yoshikazu Yamashita, Junji Morii, Shinji Okane, Natsuko Yokoyama	Part 3	
5	Nintendo Switch Sports	May 26, 2022	Takayuki Shimamura, Yoshikazu Yamashita, Junji Morii, Shinji Okane, Natsuko Yokoyama	Part 4	
6	Xenoblade Chronicles 3	July 26, 2022	Tetsuya Takahashi, Koh Kojima, Genki Yokota	Part 1	
6	Xenoblade Chronicles 3	July 26, 2022	Tetsuya Takahashi, Koh Kojima, Genki Yokota	Part 2	
6	Xenoblade Chronicles 3	July 26, 2022	Tetsuya Takahashi, Koh Kojima, Genki Yokota	Part 3	
7	Splatoon 3	September 7, 2022	Hisashi Nogami, Seita Inoue, Shintaro Sato, Toru Minegishi	Part 1	
7	Splatoon 3	September 7, 2022	Hisashi Nogami, Seita Inoue, Shintaro Sato, Toru Minegishi	Part 2	
7	Splatoon 3	September 7, 2022	Hisashi Nogami, Seita Inoue, Shintaro Sato, Toru Minegishi	Part 3	
7	Splatoon 3	September 7, 2022	Hisashi Nogami, Seita Inoue, Shintaro Sato, Toru Minegishi	Part 4	
8	Fire Emblem Engage	January 17, 2023	Tsutomu Tei, Masahiro Higuchi, Genki Yokota, Kenta Nakanishi	Part 1	
8	Fire Emblem Engage	January 17, 2023	Tsutomu Tei, Masahiro Higuchi, Genki Yokota, Kenta Nakanishi	Part 2	
8	Fire Emblem Engage	January 17, 2023	Tsutomu Tei, Masahiro Higuchi, Genki Yokota, Kenta Nakanishi	Part 3	
9	The Legend of Zelda: Tears of the Kingdom	May 9, 2023	Eiji Aonuma, Hidemaro Fujibayashi, Takuhiro Dohta, Satoru Takizawa, Hajime Wakai	Part 1	
9	The Legend of Zelda: Tears of the Kingdom	May 9, 2023	Eiji Aonuma, Hidemaro Fujibayashi, Takuhiro Dohta, Satoru Takizawa, Hajime Wakai	Part 2	
9	The Legend of Zelda: Tears of the Kingdom	May 9, 2023	Eiji Aonuma, Hidemaro Fujibayashi, Takuhiro Dohta, Satoru Takizawa, Hajime Wakai	Part 3	
9	The Legend of Zelda: Tears of the Kingdom	May 9, 2023	Eiji Aonuma, Hidemaro Fujibayashi, Takuhiro Dohta, Satoru Takizawa, Hajime Wakai	Part 4	
9	The Legend of Zelda: Tears of the Kingdom	May 9, 2023	Eiji Aonuma, Hidemaro Fujibayashi, Takuhiro Dohta, Satoru Takizawa, Hajime Wakai	Part 5	
10	Pikmin 4	July 18, 2023	Shigeru Miyamoto, Yuji Kando, Shigefumi Hino, Masamichi Abe, Junji Morii	Part 1	
10	Pikmin 4	July 18, 2023	Shigeru Miyamoto, Yuji Kando, Yutaka Hiramuki, Taku Matoba, Mitsuhiro Kida	Part 2	
10	Pikmin 4	July 18, 2023	Shigeru Miyamoto, Yuji Kando, Yutaka Hiramuki, Taku Matoba, Mitsuhiro Kida	Part 3	
11	Super Mario Bros. Wonder	October 17, 2023	Takashi Tezuka, Shiro Mouri, Koichi Hayashida, Masanobu Sato, Koji Kondo	Part 1	
11	Super Mario Bros. Wonder	October 17, 2023	Takashi Tezuka, Shiro Mouri, Koichi Hayashida, Masanobu Sato, Koji Kondo	Part 2	
11	Super Mario Bros. Wonder	October 17, 2023	Takashi Tezuka, Shiro Mouri, Koichi Hayashida, Masanobu Sato, Koji Kondo	Part 3	
11	Super Mario Bros. Wonder	October 17, 2023	Takashi Tezuka, Shiro Mouri, Koichi Hayashida, Masanobu Sato, Koji Kondo	Part 4	
12	Emio – The Smiling Man: Famicom Detective Club	August 28, 2024	Yoshio Sakamoto, Kaori Miyachi	Part 1	
12	Emio – The Smiling Man: Famicom Detective Club	August 28, 2024	Yoshio Sakamoto, Kaori Miyachi	Part 2	
12	Emio – The Smiling Man: Famicom Detective Club	August 28, 2024	Yoshio Sakamoto, Kaori Miyachi	Part 3	
13	The Legend of Zelda: Echoes of Wisdom	September 23, 2024	Eiji Aonuma, Tomomi Sano, Satoshi Terada	Part 1	
13	The Legend of Zelda: Echoes of Wisdom	September 23, 2024	Eiji Aonuma, Tomomi Sano, Satoshi Terada	Part 2	
13	The Legend of Zelda: Echoes of Wisdom	September 23, 2024	Eiji Aonuma, Tomomi Sano, Satoshi Terada	Part 3	
13	The Legend of Zelda: Echoes of Wisdom	September 23, 2024	Eiji Aonuma, Tomomi Sano, Satoshi Terada	Part 4	
14	Nintendo Sound Clock: Alarmo	October 9, 2024	Yosuke Tamori, Tetsuya Akama	Part 1	
14	Nintendo Sound Clock: Alarmo	October 9, 2024	Yosuke Tamori, Tetsuya Akama	Part 2	
14	Nintendo Sound Clock: Alarmo	October 9, 2024	Yosuke Tamori, Tetsuya Akama	Part 3	
14	Nintendo Sound Clock: Alarmo	October 9, 2024	Yosuke Tamori, Tetsuya Akama	Part 4	
15	Mario & Luigi: Brothership	December 4, 2024	Akira Otani, Tomoki Fukushima, Haruyuki Ohashi, Hitomi Furuta	Part 1	
15	Mario & Luigi: Brothership	December 4, 2024	Akira Otani, Tomoki Fukushima, Haruyuki Ohashi, Hitomi Furuta	Part 2	
15	Mario & Luigi: Brothership	December 4, 2024	Akira Otani, Tomoki Fukushima, Haruyuki Ohashi, Hitomi Furuta	Part 3	
15	Mario & Luigi: Brothership	December 4, 2024	Akira Otani, Tomoki Fukushima, Haruyuki Ohashi, Hitomi Furuta	Part 4	
16	Nintendo Switch 2	April 2, 2025	Kouichi Kawamoto, Takuhiro Dohta, Tetsuya Sasaki	Part 1	
16	Nintendo Switch 2	April 2, 2025	Kouichi Kawamoto, Takuhiro Dohta, Tetsuya Sasaki	Part 2	
16	Nintendo Switch 2	April 2, 2025	Kouichi Kawamoto, Takuhiro Dohta, Tetsuya Sasaki	Part 3	
16	Nintendo Switch 2	April 2, 2025	Kouichi Kawamoto, Takuhiro Dohta, Tetsuya Sasaki	Part 4	
17	GameChat	April 3, 2025	Sumikazu Ono, Eiji Tokunaga, Yoshikata Tamura	Part 1	
17	GameChat	April 3, 2025	Sumikazu Ono, Eiji Tokunaga, Yoshikata Tamura	Part 2	
17	GameChat	April 3, 2025	Sumikazu Ono, Eiji Tokunaga, Yoshikata Tamura	Part 3	
18	Mario Kart World	May 21, 2025	Kosuke Yabuki, Kenta Sato, Masaaki Ishikawa, Shintaro Jikumaru, Atsuko Asahi	Part 1	
18	Mario Kart World	May 21, 2025	Kosuke Yabuki, Kenta Sato, Masaaki Ishikawa, Shintaro Jikumaru, Atsuko Asahi	Part 2	
18	Mario Kart World	May 21, 2025	Kosuke Yabuki, Kenta Sato, Masaaki Ishikawa, Shintaro Jikumaru, Atsuko Asahi	Part 3	
18	Mario Kart World	May 21, 2025	Kosuke Yabuki, Kenta Sato, Masaaki Ishikawa, Shintaro Jikumaru, Atsuko Asahi	Part 4	
19	Donkey Kong Bananza	July 15, 2025	Kenta Motokura, Kazuya Takahashi, Wataru Tanaka, Daisuke Watanabe, Naoto Kubo	Part 1	
19	Donkey Kong Bananza	July 15, 2025	Kenta Motokura, Kazuya Takahashi, Wataru Tanaka, Daisuke Watanabe, Naoto Kubo	Part 2	
19	Donkey Kong Bananza	July 15, 2025	Kenta Motokura, Kazuya Takahashi, Wataru Tanaka, Daisuke Watanabe, Naoto Kubo	Part 3	
20	Drag x Drive	December 2, 2025	Yoshinori Konishi, Hiroki Hamaue, Takahisa Ikejiri, Isami Yoshida	Part 1	
20	Drag x Drive	December 2, 2025	Yoshinori Konishi, Hiroki Hamaue, Takahisa Ikejiri, Isami Yoshida	Part 2	
20	Drag x Drive	December 2, 2025	Yoshinori Konishi, Hiroki Hamaue, Takahisa Ikejiri, Isami Yoshida	Part 3	
21	Tomodachi Life: Living The Dream	April 14, 2026	Ryutaro Takahashi, Takaomi Ueno, Naonori Ohnishi, Daisuke Kageyama, Toru Minegishi	Part 1	
21	Tomodachi Life: Living The Dream	April 14, 2026	Ryutaro Takahashi, Takaomi Ueno, Naonori Ohnishi, Daisuke Kageyama, Toru Minegishi	Part 2	
21	Tomodachi Life: Living The Dream	April 14, 2026	Ryutaro Takahashi, Takaomi Ueno, Naonori Ohnishi, Daisuke Kageyama, Toru Minegishi	Part 3	
22	Splatoon Raiders	July 21, 2026	Seita Inoue, Yoshihiko Ito, Koji Sonoyama, Shu Tamura	Part 1	
22	Splatoon Raiders	July 21, 2026	Seita Inoue, Yoshihiko Ito, Koji Sonoyama, Shu Tamura	Part 2	
22	Splatoon Raiders	July 21, 2026	Seita Inoue, Yoshihiko Ito, Koji Sonoyama, Shu Tamura	Part 3	
23	Fire Emblem: Fortune's Weave	September 15, 2026	Toshiyuki Kusakihara, Masahiro Higuchi, Genki Yokota, Kenta Nakanishi	Part 1	
23	Fire Emblem: Fortune's Weave	September 15, 2026	Toshiyuki Kusakihara, Masahiro Higuchi, Genki Yokota, Kenta Nakanishi	Part 2	
23	Fire Emblem: Fortune's Weave	September 15, 2026	Toshiyuki Kusakihara, Masahiro Higuchi, Genki Yokota, Kenta Nakanishi	Part 3	
24	The Legend of Zelda: Ocarina of Time	November 2, 2026	Eiji Aonuma, Hidemaro Fujibayashi, HokWai Ng, Aya Shida, Hiroki Taguchi, Masato Ohashi	Part 1	
24	The Legend of Zelda: Ocarina of Time	November 2, 2026	Eiji Aonuma, Hidemaro Fujibayashi, HokWai Ng, Aya Shida, Hiroki Taguchi, Masato Ohashi	Part 2	
24	The Legend of Zelda: Ocarina of Time	November 2, 2026	Eiji Aonuma, Hidemaro Fujibayashi, HokWai Ng, Aya Shida, Hiroki Taguchi, Masato Ohashi	Part 3	
24	The Legend of Zelda: Ocarina of Time	November 2, 2026	Eiji Aonuma, Hidemaro Fujibayashi, HokWai Ng, Aya Shida, Hiroki Taguchi, Masato Ohashi	Part 4	

== See also ==
- List of Nintendo Direct presentations
- Nintendo Network
