= Tank Troopers =

2016 video game

- Developers: Nintendo EPD; Vitei
- Publisher: Nintendo
- Directors: Takaya Imamura; Atsushi Obata
- Producer: Tadashi Sugiyama
- Designer: Takao Kurebayashi
- Programmers: Giles Goddard; Daniel P. Wright; Alex Miyamoto; Nathan Heckel; Shintaro Iguchi
- Artists: Yuki Kaneko; Ryo Koizumi; Ryuusuke Yoshida; Keisuke Okubo
- Composer: Ryō Nagamatsu
- Platform: Nintendo 3DS
- Release: JP: December 21, 2016; WW: February 16, 2017
- Genres: Action; Shooter
- Modes: Single-player; Multiplayer

Tank Troopers is a tank-based action third-person shooter game developed and published by Nintendo, with assistance from Vitei, for the Nintendo 3DS. The game was released on the 3DS eShop in Japan in December 2016 and worldwide two months later.

== Gameplay ==
Tank Troopers is an action, third-person shooter game in which players control a customizable tank, each with a unique ability or feature. The game includes more than 30 tanks to select from, and features a local wireless multiplayer mode in which up to six players battle each other in either team-based or free-for-all battles. The game also includes a single-player mode, featuring 30 different stages each with a unique challenge.

== Reception and legacy ==
Nintendo World Report scored Tank Troopers an 8 out of 10. The staff called the lack of online multiplayer "baffling", but praised the gameplay along with its responsive and smooth controls, stating that it would be "a great addition to any gamer's Nintendo 3DS library".

Nintendo Life reviewed the game, scoring it a 6 out of 10 stars, saying that "The problem is, despite solid foundations, the title falls short simply because it does not offer any online functionality".

Japanese video game magazine Famitsu gave it a score of 32 out of 40, calling it a very fun and simple game with great local wireless multiplayer. Having no online multiplayer was the most common criticism.

Destructoid gave the game a 6 out of 10, noting "you have five friends nearby who also have a Nintendo 3DS, and you're all interested in playing Tank Troopers, go ahead and buy it because you are the only type of gamer who will get the maximum enjoyment out it. For everyone else, it's an easy pass".

According to Vitei founder Giles Goddard, in an interview with MinnMax, the studio developed a Nintendo Switch version of Tank Troopers which was canceled. Goddard mentions that Vitei's rendering engine is what made the Switch version possible. The technology was multiplatform where it could be easily scaled which allowed the development team to dial back resolution if needed.

In late 2021, a Nintendo 3DS game developed by Butterfly called Gal Galaxy Pain included an unlockable cryptic text giving tribute to Tank Troopers and two of its characters.
