= Pro Evolution Soccer 2011 =

2010 video game

- Cover art featuring FC Barcelona's Lionel Messi
- Developer: Konami
- Publisher: Konami
- Producer: Shingo Takatsuka
- Series: Pro Evolution Soccer
- Platforms: Microsoft Windows; PlayStation 2 PlayStation 3 PlayStation Portable; Xbox 360 iOS; Android; Symbian; Wii; Windows Phone 7
- Release: October 8, 2010: PlayStation 3, Windows, & Xbox 360; EU: October 8, 2010; AS: October 14, 2010 (PS3); NA: October 19, 2010 (PS3, X360); AU: October 19, 2010; AS: October 20, 2010 (X360); JP: October 28, 2010 (PS3, X360) Wii; AS: October 20, 2010; EU: October 29, 2010; AU: November 8, 2010; JP: November 18, 2010; NA: November 23, 2010 iOS; NA: October 21, 2010 PlayStation 2 & PlayStation Portable; EU: October 29, 2010; NA: November 2, 2010 (PSP); NA: November 4, 2010 (PS2); AU: November 8, 2010; JP: November 18, 2010; AS: November 18, 2010 Windows Mobile; NA: February 10, 2011
- Genre: Sports
- Modes: Single-player, multiplayer

Pro Evolution Soccer 2011 (PES 2011, known as World Soccer: Winning Eleven 2011 in Asia) is an association football video game in the Pro Evolution Soccer series developed and published by Konami. It was released in 2010–2011. The UEFA Champions League and UEFA Europa League are featured within the game, and for the first time in the series, UEFA Super Cup and CONMEBOL's Copa Libertadores are fully licensed. PES 2011 was succeeded by Pro Evolution Soccer 2012.

== Gameplay ==
=== Content ===
With an exclusive deal with UEFA and CONMEBOL, the UEFA Champions League, the UEFA Europa League and, for the first time, the UEFA Super Cup and Copa Libertadores are fully licensed. The tournaments are integrated into the Master League mode, and for the first time in the Master League Online mode. UEFA Super Cup and UEFA Europa League, however, are only available on the PC, PS3, and Xbox 360 versions.

The game contains 79 national teams.

The Copa Santander Libertadores tournament is featured for the first time, such as its teams, which are fully licensed, but cannot be selected for play in any other game modes. The following is a list of the competitors:

Like previous versions, there is also a separate two leagues with 18 empty teams (PES League and D2 League), each of which can be edited fully. Since its introduction, it has become very popular amongst the PES community, and as a result, they are usually made into the Bundesliga or another league of one's preference by patch makers. All the teams are entirely fictional.

== Commentators ==
- Jon Champion and ITV's Jim Beglin provide the English commentary.
- Christian Martinoli and Luis García provide the Spanish commentary for Latin America.
- Silvio Luiz and Mauro Beting provide the Portuguese commentary for Brazil.
- Grégoire Margotton and Christophe Dugarry provide the French commentary.
- Wolff-Christoph Fuss and Hansi Küpper provide the German commentary.
- Christos Sotirakopoulos and Georgios Thanailakis provide the Greek commentary.
- Pierluigi Pardo and José Altafini provide the Italian commentary.
- Jon Kabira, Tsuyoshi Kitazawa and Hiroshi Nanami provide the Japanese commentary.
- Pedro Sousa and Luís Freitas Lobo provide the Portuguese commentary for Portugal.
- Carlos Martínez and Julio Maldonado provide the Spanish commentary for Spain.
- Hasan Mustan and Emin Zevkler provide the Turkish commentary for Turkey.

== Development ==
The game was announced on 9 February 2010. The first trailer was released on 4 May 2010, while an E3 trailer was released in June 2010, showing some of the new features of the game. The game also sees the return of Lionel Messi as its cover star. It is currently the last game to feature the Argentine footballer as its cover star. ITV's Jim Beglin has been implemented as new co-commentator to Jon Champion for PES 2011.

A demo of PES 2011 was released for PC and PS3 in September 2010. The demo allowed users to play ten-minute games with four teams available: FC Barcelona and Bayern Munich or Copa Libertadores pair Chivas de Guadalajara and SC Internacional. A video presentation was also included after each match outlining the full game's content in readiness of the game's UK launch on 8 October 2010.

== Release ==
On September 30, 2010, the first update for the PC, PS3 and Xbox 360 added three new features to the Online mode: Legends, Community, and Competition.

On October 12, 2010, Datapack 1.01 included changes to the England national team kits and update various team rosters. Clubs that qualified for the Champions League Group Stages would be added to the game's dedicated mode. A number of team kits have also been updated in line with their current use, and four more licensed boots have been incorporated. One problem that arose was that the Belgium Republic of Ireland's kit changed to De Graafschap of Netherlands. Konami then released another update on October 15 to correct this mistake.

On November 24, 2010, Version 1.02 adjusted the defender AI to allow for more consistent pressing from various situations and includes a series of alterations based on feedback from users. AI pressure more in certain situation (especially when crossing). Cursor switching improved, including when ball is crossed. Difficulty and success rate of Rainbow Flicks has been changed (more difficult). Transfer fees in Master League has been reworked. The player can turn off player names above CPU players. Shooting has been tweaked. Chants have been refined or changed.

On December 21, 2010, Version 1.03 fixed from all previous corrective patches. Online Mode connectivity issues have been improved through changes made to the disconnection process.

On December 21, 2010, Datapack 2.00 added a number of new items to the game. 12 kits have been updated within the game, including those of the Republic of Ireland Belgium national team kits, 1 Dutch club and some 10 French club teams. And 10 new boots, including of new boots Mizuno, from "Wave Ignitus" and "Supersonic Wave".

On 15 March 2011, Datapack 7.00 added the winter transfers and movements up to the end of the January transfer window have been updated for 135 Club teams, 3 national teams kits (Belgium) (Spain and Sweden) and 10 new boots, from Adidas, Nike, Puma and Umbro.

The game online services were shut down on November 30, 2013, along with all downloadable content.

== Reception ==
Reception

Aggregate scores
Aggregator	Score						
Aggregator	iOS	PC	PS2	PS3	PSP	Wii	Xbox 360
GameRankings	70%	78.50%	N/A	77.87%	75.67%	76.33%	77.28%
Metacritic	76/100	79/100	80/100	77/100	74/100	78/100	79/100

Review scores
Publication	Score						
Publication	iOS	PC	PS2	PS3	PSP	Wii	Xbox 360
Destructoid	N/A	N/A	N/A	N/A	N/A	N/A	6.5/10
Edge	N/A	N/A	N/A	6/10	N/A	N/A	N/A
Eurogamer	N/A	N/A	N/A	N/A	N/A	N/A	7/10
Game Informer	N/A	N/A	N/A	9/10	N/A	N/A	9/10
GameSpot	N/A	N/A	N/A	8/10	N/A	7/10	8/10
GameTrailers	N/A	N/A	N/A	N/A	N/A	N/A	8.6/10
GameZone	N/A	N/A	N/A	7/10	N/A	N/A	7/10
IGN	N/A	N/A	N/A	9/10	N/A	N/A	9/10
Official Xbox Magazine (US)	N/A	N/A	N/A	N/A	N/A	N/A	8.5/10
PC Gamer (UK)	N/A	74%	N/A	N/A	N/A	N/A	N/A
PlayStation: The Official Magazine	N/A	N/A	N/A	8/10	N/A	N/A	N/A
The Daily Telegraph	N/A	N/A	N/A	N/A	N/A	N/A	8/10
The Guardian	N/A	N/A	N/A	N/A	N/A	N/A	3/5

The game was met with positive to average reception. GameRankings and Metacritic gave it a score of 80 out of 100 for the PlayStation 2 version; 78.50% and 79 out of 100 for the PC version; 77.87% and 77 out of 100 for the PlayStation 3 version; 77.28% and 79 out of 100 for the Xbox 360 version; 76.33% and 78 out of 100 for the Wii version; 75.67% and 74 out of 100 for the PSP version; and 70% and 76 out of 100 for the iOS version.

411Mania gave the Xbox 360 version a score of 8.1/10 and called it "a massive improvement over the last few games in the series. While by no means perfect, Konami have finally shown a glimpse of the capabilities that made the brand famous in the first place." The Escapist gave it four stars out of five and said it was "much better to play on the pitch itself than its chief competitor, while the lack of important football licenses and a unimpressive menu interface keep it from being a full package." The Daily Telegraph similarly gave it a score of eight out of ten and called it "a daft, charming, idiosyncratic, video game approximation of football." However, The Guardian gave it three stars out of five and stated, "More generally there is much better access to tactics and strategy, with players able to manipulate their team's position and lineups to an almost Football Manager-style degree."

== See also ==
- Pro Evolution Soccer 2011 3D
