= Game & Wario =

2013 video game

- European packaging artwork
- Developers: Nintendo SPD; Intelligent Systems
- Publisher: Nintendo
- Directors: Goro Abe; Naoko Mori
- Producers: Yoshio Sakamoto; Toshio Sengoku; Naoki Nakano
- Designers: Daisuke Yasumatsu; Yoshio Sakamoto
- Programmer: Yasuhito Fujisawa
- Artist: Ko Takeuchi
- Composers: Yasuhisa Baba; Masanobu Matsunaga; Takeru Kanazaki; Hiroki Morishita; Sho Murakami; Yoshito Sekigawa
- Series: Wario
- Engine: Havok
- Platform: Wii U
- Release: JP: March 28, 2013; NA: June 23, 2013; EU: June 28, 2013
- Genre: Party
- Modes: Single-player, multiplayer

Game & Wario (Note: Game & Wario (ゲーム&ワリオ, Gēmu ando Wario)) is a 2013 party video game developed by Nintendo and Intelligent Systems and published for the Wii U, named after LCD Game & Watch titles. It is the ninth installment in the WarioWare series and part of the larger Mario franchise. The story stars Wario and his friends, who take advantage of a newly-released video game console with two separate screens by making games for monetary gain. Game & Wario consists of 16 minigames that exclusively utilize the Wii U GamePad and its functions. Additional modes and collectibles are also unlockable. The majority of the minigames are single-player, although some are designed for multiplayer only.

The developer's goal was to create a minigame collection for the Wii U that would come pre-installed on the console. As the number of ideas grew and the task to create a serious minigame collection proved difficult, however, the game was set to release at a later date and the game became a new entry in the WarioWare series. Each game was made to be as if they could be released on their own, and were made to have as much detail and replayability as possible. Several established names from Nintendo were also involved with the project. The game was announced at E3 2012 and was set to release in the Wii U's launch window; after an extra delay, and the creation of a mock crowdfunding website to promote the game, it was first released on March 28, 2013, in Japan and the following June in North America and Europe.

Game & Wario received mixed reviews. Select games were collectively praised and others criticized, while the game as whole received criticism for its lack of content and for straying from the WarioWare formula. The game debuted in the top ten best-selling games for three weeks straight, and the minigame Gamer was featured as a stage in Super Smash Bros. for 3DS and Wii U. It was followed by WarioWare Gold in 2018.

== Gameplay and plot ==
In Fruit, the player with the Wii U GamePad tries to steal fruit without being noticed by the players observing the television.

Game & Wario is a party video game consisting of sixteen minigames; of these minigames, 10 are single-player only, two allow for up to two players, and four are multi-player only for up to five players. Every game is played exclusively with the Wii U GamePad, without the use of Wii Remotes. For example, in the minigame "Gamer", on the GamePad, the player controls 9-Volt, playing video games past his bedtime. Players are tasked with WarioWare style microgames, featuring simple objectives that must be completed quickly. The player must also pay attention to the television screen and be prepared to hide the video game to avoid being caught by 9-Volt's mother, 5-Volt. 9-Volt has a meter that decreases his awakeness the longer he hides, causing 9-Volt to fall asleep if it is fully diminished. The game ends if 9-Volt is caught by 5-Volt, runs out of lives in his game, or ends up falling asleep by hiding for too long. The use of the GamePad varies for each minigame, such as tilting the GamePad to control the character in Ashley and Ski, or using it to view a different perspective of the game in Kung Fu and Taxi. A selection of games can only be played in multiplayer; in the multiplayer minigames, players take turns controlling the game by passing around the GamePad, such as Islands, or one player uses the GamePad to perform a special role, such as Fruit and Sketchpad. More minigames are unlocked as you progress through the game; different game modes and difficulty settings within them are also unlockable. During the minigames, players can earn tokens which are used in a 'Chick-N-Win' capsule machine to unlock additional collectibles and minigames.

The story centers around Wario, who learned of a newly released video game console that features a second screen. Ecstatic about the opportunity to make a fortune selling games on it, he begins designing his own console. His friends join in, designing games of their own.

== Development ==
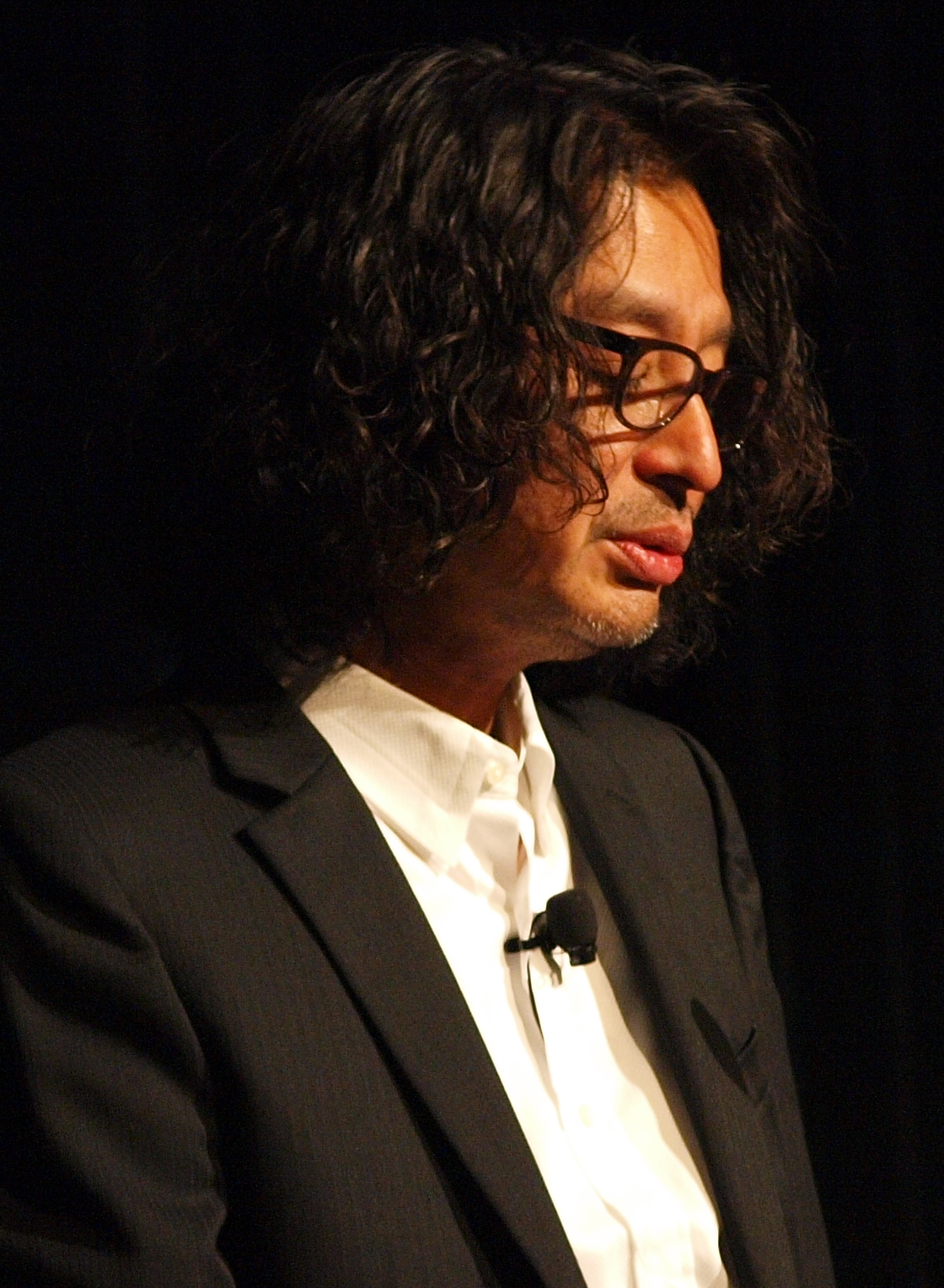
Yoshio Sakamoto in 2010, the game's producer

"And I do think that WarioWare serves as a really useful container. It has the capacity to hold all manner of things that wouldn't normally belong together, and it allows them to mix and mingle. If ideas are fun, you can always find a place for them in a WarioWare title, even if they have no obvious connection. You always have that excuse: "Well it is WarioWare after all!"

— Nintendo president Satoru Iwata, 2013 Iwata Asks interview

Game & Wario was developed by Nintendo Software Planning & Development (Nintendo SPD) and Intelligent Systems. Yoshio Sakamoto was the game's producer and oversaw the project as a consultant. The game's lead directors were Goro Abe from Nintendo SPD and Naoko Mori from Intelligent Systems. Abe conceived and planned the games and features, which Mori would interpret and implement. Development started with Nintendo SPD, followed by Intelligent Systems joining the project early on.

Development began in January 2011 prior to the release of the Wii U. The game was initially planned to come pre-installed on the console and not tie into any established Nintendo franchise. A prototype of "Pirates" was demonstrated as "Shield Pose" at E3 2011, which saw the player using the Wii U GamePad as a shield to block arrows displayed on the television screen.

=== Graphics, writing, and shift to WarioWare ===
Development was difficult for the two teams; as they had been involved in the WarioWare games prior, they struggled to create minigames that were general and demonstrated the Wii U in the "clearest, most elegant way". According to Abe, "The WarioWare team have always had free rein to come up with all kinds of zany ideas", and found the task creatively restricting. Some ideas considered were shelved for not fitting a serious formula to use for future WarioWare titles. Sakamoto was concerned the team was not going to be able to create a successful game for this reason, but did not say anything at the time because of the development's strict time limit. During the summer of 2011 it was decided that the game would not be pre-installed on the Wii U, as the number of ideas the developers had caused the project to be too large.

At this time it was still not a WarioWare title, as the developers did not know how to make the series' distinct art style graphically appealing with HD graphics. "Shield Pose" was remade to be "Pirates" with a pirate theme, and presented the minigame to Nintendo SPD art coordinator Hitoshi Kobayashi for advice on the game's looks and graphics. He suggested that they "focus on making the types of image they are good at": as distinct and unique as possible. On the subject of "Pirates", he took note that the character design was 2-dimensially thin, and recommended it be designed to look like paper. The teams struggled with writing a story as it was not their strong suit and set a deadline of December 2011 to complete it. They tried to write a coherent story through trial and error, but failed to connect all of the minigames together into one overarching plot. They then decided that the game would be a WarioWare game, with the story being that each of the minigames were games developed by the WarioWare characters. Many ideas and elements that made up the rejected plot were reused and referenced in the game's selection of interactive "Chick-N-Win" side collectibles. The goal was to make 100 collectibles, but they came up with 300 unique ideas, eventually trimming the list down to 240.

The game's title was word play of Nintendo's series of handheld LCD games, Game & Watch. Since Game & Wario featured gameplay atypical of traditional WarioWare games, they made the title distinct so this was not entirely implied. "Game and Wario" was selected because both "Watch" and "Wario" begin with a W, making it visually appealing when the Game & Watch graphic was replicated for Game & Wario. Each minigame were titled with one word to also replicate the nature of the Game & Watch handhelds.

=== Minigames ===
Since the game was designed to be pre-installed on the Wii U they knew not everyone would also have Wii remotes, so the minigames were designed to exclusively use the Wii U GamePad. The goal was to use the GamePad to create completely original gameplay never seen before, using its unique features. When it was decided the game would be a WarioWare title, gameplay for each minigame became even more distinct from each other. Characters from the series were assigned to be the "creator" of each of the minigames, so they made sure each one highlighted that character's personality. The team stopped using the term "minigame" to describe each minigame individually as it would often limit the scale each game had; being so conscious about this, it caused them to make title screens for each individual minigame. Title screens were made to evoke feelings similar to the box art of games on the Nintendo Entertainment System, which usually had super complex imagery no matter what the gameplay itself actually was. Menus and stage select screens were also made for each individual minigame.

Various other established Nintendo developers and producers lent assistance on each individual minigame, offering ideas and support as development progressed. In a 2013 Iwata Asks interview, Mori referred to these staff members as "Nintendo All-Stars", and compared their help to the amount of assistance that Super Smash Bros. received. Various "Nintendo All-Stars" included: Kirby's Return to Dream Land director Kazuhiro Yoshikawa, who helped design the minigame "Arrow"; Kirby's Epic Yarn and Jam with the Band producer Nobuo Matsumiya helped design "Kung Fu"; and Kensuke Tanabe and Risa Tabata, producers of various games in the Metroid Prime and Paper Mario series, helped design "Ashley" and "Islands". Specific parts of these minigame's development process were left to their associated designer without additional input, for the sake of not complicating the development process. Developers from Brain Age: Concentration Training were also involved with the general development process.

Designer Hitoshi Kobayashi formed a design team at Nintendo SPD to specifically help further polish the gameplay of the minigames "Ski" and "Islands". Mori recalled a meeting between the teams led by Kobayashi and Tanabe getting tense over the minigame "Islands"; Tanabe argued the minigame should have "kind of resort feel, and that the graphics should feature beautiful natural scenes", while Kobayashi argued that the game was too close to its deadline and in order for it to be completed on time the game would need to have a downscaled, toy-like feel. Tanabe insisted that with this type of design the game would not be entertaining and lose appeal, eventually yelling "NATURAL SPLENDOUR" at the end of the meeting. When this detail was mentioned in the Iwata Asks interview, Iwata specified from personal experience that Tanabe was not aggressive but rather passionate. The final product featured Tanabe's vision, which assured to Sakamoto that HD graphics could work on a WarioWare title.

=== Announcement and release ===
Screenshot of the "Crowdfarter" website, a promotional stunt

Game & Wario was announced among a list of upcoming titles for the Wii U at E3 2012, an announcement that Game Informer referred to as a "stealth-reveal". IGN expressed frustration with the reveal and the lack of attention it was given in comparison to the announcements of New Super Mario Bros. U and Nintendo Land. Game & Wario was slated to release within the launch window of the Wii U; any day from its release to March 2013. In January 2013, Nintendo announced the delay of several games, among them Game & Wario, and would instead release sometime in the first half of 2013. In an April 2013 Nintendo Direct, an overview of gameplay was shown, and an official release date was announced. In May, Nintendo launched a mock donation website called "Crowdfarter", designed to look as if it were made by Wario's development team. It featured a parodic donation campaign, where visitors could "donate" by promoting the game on Facebook and Twitter, and liking posts by Nintendo on the platforms. By doing so, "milestones" would be hit and content would be unlocked, including Game & Wario wallpapers and ringtones, and an exclusive Game & Wario trailer. Game & Wario released March 28, 2013 in Japan, June 23 in North America, and the following June 28 in Europe.

=== Sales and post release ===
In the games opening week in Japan, Game & Wario sold 22,491 copies and ranked 10th in weekly sales overall, behind Nintendo's Animal Crossing: New Leaf and Luigi's Mansion: Dark Moon. It sold 11,064 copies the following week and 4,719 the week after, continually underperforming against New Leaf and Dark Moon. The release of Game & Wario and Dragon Quest X helped double Wii U sales in March 2013, temporarily surpassing PS3 sales. In Super Smash Bros. for Wii U, a stage based on the Gamer minigame was included; the stage features 5-Volt as an enemy to the players, who will damage any players that are in her line of sight.

== Reception ==
Reception

Aggregate score
Aggregator	Score
Metacritic	61/100

Review scores
Publication	Score
Destructoid	7.5/10
Eurogamer	6/10
Famitsu	31/40
Game Informer	8/10
GameSpot	5/10
GamesRadar+	2.5/5
IGN	5.1/10
Nintendo Life	7/10
Nintendo World Report	7.5/10; 5.5/10
PCMag	3.5/5

Game & Wario received a 61/100 on review aggregator website Metacritic based on 60 critic reviews, indicating "mixed or average reviews".

Critics generally praised Gamer for its inventive use of the GamePad, Taxi for its tactile depth, and Pirates for its replayability. Game Informer's Kyle Hillard considered Gamer to be the best entry in the game, as did IGN's Kaz MacDonald; Hilliard credited this especially for its unique sound and visual design, believing that Gamer validated the Wii U GamePad and would not work as successfully on any other console. Heidi Kemps of GameSpot called Taxi "brilliant" and wished the game were developed and expanded on into its own game. MacDonald called Pirates "great fun to play and good fun to watch, making the most of the comedy potential of having you spin around wildly with a screen in your hands." Fruit was the only multiplayer game commonly praised; Christian Donlan of Eurogamer referred to Fruit as the best and only enjoyable multiplayer minigame, comparing it positively to the video games Hidden in Plain Sight and SpyParty.

Minigames that were frequently criticized were Kung Fu, Ashley, and Ski, mainly for their unintuitive control schemes that did not justify the use of the Wii U GamePad. The gameplay of Patchwork was praised, although MacDonald considered the minigame uninteresting, and Engadget's Bob Mackey insisted the game did not fit in the package. Kemps criticized the GamePad being used excessively for precision-based minigames, especially how often it was used for minigames involving tilting the GamePad; Donlan also felt the minigame Bowling suffered from the unnecessary use of the GamePad. Reviewers criticized the small amount of multiplayer minigames.

Donlan praised the collectibles' variety and amount, saying that they "genuinely capture the series' unpredictable sense of humour—something the rest of the game struggles with." Kotaku's Stephen Totilo also considered the collectibles to be brilliant, believing them, and the game's comedy, to be the only successful selling point of the game. Totilo derided Game & Wario's formula for being individually lackluster and feeling overall experimental; Famitsu staff also felt this, considering the overall package to be lacking content. Totilo and Kemps reminisced on past WarioWare titles for being continuously and consistently creative, while critics overall felt Game & Wario was relatively hit or miss in its selection.

== See also ==
- List of Wario video games
- List of Wii U games
- List of party video games
- 2013 in video games
