= Takaya Imamura =

Japanese video game designer and illustrator (born 1966)

- 今村 孝矢
- Born: April 10, 1966 (age 60); Takarazuka, Hyogo, Japan
- Occupations: Video game designer; illustrator; teacher
- Years active: 1989–present
- Employers: Nintendo (1989–2021); International Professional University of Technology (2021–present)
- Known for: Contributing to the design of major Nintendo games, designing the characters of F-Zero and Star Fox and creating Tingle from Zelda

Takaya Imamura (今村 孝矢, Imamura Takaya; born April 10, 1966) is a Japanese video game designer, manga artist and educator. From 1989 to 2021, Imamura worked at Nintendo, where he designed the characters and story of F-Zero, including Captain Falcon, and most of the supporting characters from the Star Fox series of video games. He also played a role in designing games in the Legend of Zelda series, such as The Legend of Zelda: Majora's Mask, invented the character Tingle, and served as supervising producer for F-Zero GX.

== Early life ==
When Imamura was in college, he was an enthusiastic gamer who had played several Famicom titles including Metroid, Zanac and Super Mario Bros. 3, but he still wanted to be a manga artist, his childhood dream. He considered video games developed by computer programmers and did not envision the role of an artist in making them.

== Career ==
=== Work at Nintendo ===
Imamura applied for a job at Nintendo because he thought he could help illustrate box art and instruction booklets, wanting to join the video game industry in any way possible. He had also applied to Konami. In Nintendo's case, he had looked up their address on the back of the Super Mario Bros. instruction booklet and mailed in a job application. He went to the Kyoto-based company in person for a job interview from Shigeru Miyamoto. When asked about his favorite Nintendo game, he answered Metroid due to being a fan of science fiction, despite the fact that Miyamoto did not develop it. Nevertheless, Miyamoto was impressed by his work and gave him the job. He joined Nintendo in 1989.

Imamura was placed in Nintendo Research & Development, working under Miyamoto himself, and was surprised to learn he would be developing Super Famicom games, despite the fact that he had never used a computer keyboard. Learning how to use one, the first game he worked on was F-Zero (1990), where he reworked and edited sci-fi racing vehicle concepts created by director Kazunobu Shimizu. While they initially had wheels, they were made to hover in order to save on animation frames, and drew inspiration from Tim Burton's Batman (1989), a seminal film that established the format for modern comic book movies. Additionally, he drew animation patterns and characters, as well as designing the game's courses, due to the small team size of less than 10 people.

It was at this time that Imamura designed Captain Falcon. While he was initially intended as a mascot for the Super Famicom itself, Imamura proposed including Falcon in an American-style comic strip included in the F-Zero manual in order to add backstory to the title. This comic was approved by Nintendo and ultimately influenced the look and style of subsequent series entries, despite Falcon himself not featuring in the original game. Afterwards, Imamura assisted the development of The Legend of Zelda: A Link to the Past (1991), and designed the game's logo, most of its bosses, its map design, and helped design its mechanics alongside one of the programmers. Despite this, he was credited as an "object designer", a term Nintendo uses to describe a game's sprite artwork.

Imamura went on to work on Star Fox (1993) in collaboration with programmers Dylan Cuthbert and Giles Goddard, who had previously made a 3D game for the Game Boy, X. While they could only speak English and Imamura, only Japanese, they nevertheless became "friends for life", with director Katsuya Eguchi translating for them in "broken English". Miyamoto suggested a cast of animal characters for the game, so Imamura drew inspiration from Japanese folktales in designing them. They were also based on Nintendo employees, with Fox McCloud being inspired by Miyamoto himself. While Star Fox 2 was completed in 1995, that went unreleased until 2017 due to its release timing being seen as awkward in light of the Nintendo 64's upcoming release. It was decided that Star Fox 64 (1997) would be developed instead, which Imamura called the "game of my life" due to how hard he worked on it. While he was credited only as its art director, he worked on a large number of things beyond his official responsibility, something that was normal at the time.

Beyond his work on Star Fox, Imamura played a crucial role in developing The Legend of Zelda: Majora's Mask (2000), a game which was notorious for its one-year development time. His job was to make it look distinct from its predecessor, Ocarina of Time. In the process of development, he designed the game's titular mask, which in Japanese is named Majura. He described it in an interview as a mash-up of his own name and the title of Jurassic Park, of which he is a fan. However, Zelda series director Eiji Aonuma claimed that the name was instead based on the 1995 film Jumanji. He also created the game's "creepy" falling moon and the character Tingle, a flamboyant middle-aged man who dreams of becoming a fairy. A polarizing character, especially amongst Western fans, Tingle amassed a cult following and starred in his own spin-off games. Imamura also assisted with The Legend of Zelda: The Wind Waker (2002), stated to be the reason Tingle appeared so often in the game.

In 2003, Nintendo partnered with Sega to develop F-Zero AX and GX for arcade and GameCube. Imamura, who was a fan of Daytona USA, was excited to work on the games, calling it a "special memory" to visit Amusement Vision, Sega's development studio, where he saw the arcade cabinets they were working on. He went on to later call the critically praised GX the "ultimate F-Zero". Following its release, the F-Zero series largely went on hiatus, despite Imamura's efforts to bring it back. He stated the series would require a "grand idea" to revive, saying that F-Zero's absence was due to Mario Kart's popularity as a racing game.

Other projects worked on by Imamura while he was at Nintendo include Star Fox Adventures (2002), in collaboration with Rare, and numerous other Star Fox projects, including the Star Fox crossover content of Starlink: Battle for Atlas (2018). He also directed the Steel Diver series of submarine simulation games and Tank Troopers (2016), a stylized third-person tank combat game. Imamura remained active as a developer until his final day at the company, though not all of his projects reached store shelves. The last time he and Miyamoto worked together was during the development of Star Fox Zero (2016), where he supervised the project and wrote the scenario and storyboard for the game's tie-in anime, with which Miyamoto was heavily involved. Following the 2015 death of former Nintendo president Satoru Iwata, Miyamoto became too busy in his role as Creative Fellow to oversee individual game projects.

=== Post-Nintendo career ===
In January 2021, during the COVID-19 pandemic, Imamura retired from Nintendo after 32 years in the company working under Miyamoto. He stated that the company being empty made cleaning out his desk "a lot easier", but regretted he could not say goodbye to Miyamoto in person, and was invited to meet with him after the pandemic. Following his tenure at Nintendo, Imamura was hired as a teacher at the International Professional University of Technology in Osaka and created the manga Omega 6 during his break time, which was initially published in France. A video game adaptation titled Omega 6: The Triangle Stars was released in 2025 as a retro-styled adventure game. In addition to his other post-Nintendo projects, Imamura also contributed as a character designer on the independent game GRAPPIN.

== Works ==
| Year | Title | Role |
|---|---|---|
| 1990 | F-Zero | Graphic artist |
| 1991 | The Legend of Zelda: A Link to the Past | Object artist |
| 1993 | Star Fox | Graphic artist |
| 1994 | Stunt Race FX | CG artist |
| 1994 | Donkey Kong | CG artist |
| 1997 | Star Fox 64 | Art director |
| 1998 | F-Zero X | Chief artist, course artist |
| 2000 | The Legend of Zelda: Majora's Mask | Art director |
| 2002 | Star Fox Adventures | NCL supervisor |
| 2003 | F-Zero GX | Supervisor |
| 2003 | F-Zero: GP Legend | Supervisor |
| 2004 | F-Zero Climax | Supervisor, character design |
| 2005 | Star Fox Assault | Co-producer |
| 2006 | Star Fox Command | Producer |
| 2011 | Steel Diver | Director |
| 2011 | Star Fox 64 3D | Supervisor |
| 2014 | Steel Diver: Sub Wars | Director |
| 2016 | Star Fox Zero | Supervisor |
| 2016 | Star Fox Guard | Supervisor |
| 2016 | Tank Troopers | Director |
| 2023 | GRAPPIN | Character design |
| 2025 | Omega 6: The Triangle Stars | Graphic artist, scenario writer |
