= Rock N' Roll Climber =

2009 video game

- Developers: Vitei; Nintendo SPD Group No.3
- Publisher: Nintendo
- Producer: Kensuke Tanabe
- Engine: Unity (game engine)
- Platform: WiiWare
- Release: NA: August 10, 2009; PAL: November 13, 2009; JP: November 24, 2009
- Genre: Simulation
- Mode: Single-player

Rock N' Roll Climber is a rock climbing simulation video game for WiiWare developed by Japan-based studio Vitei and published by Nintendo. It was released in North America on August 10, 2009 and in the PAL regions on November 13.

== Gameplay ==
Players climb up a wall by using the Wii Remote and the Nunchuk to place their hands on divots and edges to grab on to. The game also supports the Wii Balance Board, allowing players to position their feet by shifting their weight as they stand on the board. Players work against both a time limit and a depleting stamina gauge, the latter which can be replenished by picking up energy drink bottles.

The game features a number of walls to climb including artificial indoor climbing walls and outdoor climbing faces that feature natural hazards such as loose footholds, waterfalls and slippery moss-covered rocks. Upon successfully reaching the top of the wall the player's avatar either performs an air guitar solo or picks up and plays an electric guitar in accomplishment.

== Development ==
The game was first revealed at Nintendo's 2009 Game Developers Conference presentation, where it was demonstrated onstage by designer Giles Goddard.

== Reception ==
IGN said the game was a "refreshingly creative idea" and featured a cool use for the Wii Remote and Nunchuk, but was also slow and plodding in pace - albeit intentionally so. Nintendo Life also thought that the premise was interesting and its execution of rock climbing was fairly realistic and gratifying, but also noted that the game's slow pace and learning curve may put off some players. Wiiloveit.com thought the Balance Board controls were intuitive and "very rewarding" despite the challenge that came from using the peripheral.
