= Pro Evolution Soccer 2011 3D =

2011 video game

- North American cover art
- Developer: Konami
- Publisher: Konami
- Series: Pro Evolution Soccer
- Platform: Nintendo 3DS
- Release: JP: February 26, 2011; EU: March 25, 2011; NA: March 27, 2011; AU: March 31, 2011
- Genre: Sports game
- Modes: Single Player; Multiplayer

Pro Evolution Soccer 2011 3D (Winning Eleven 3D Soccer in Japan) is an association football video game released as a launch title for the Nintendo 3DS, developed and published by Konami. It is a re-release of Pro Evolution Soccer 2011, but in 3D and instead of the camera being in broadcast view, the camera is behind the currently selected player.

== Features ==
PES announced in its website numerous exclusive features for the 3DS version of the game. Total Control is one of the most publicized addition to the game, enhancing passing ratio, offering good levels of control over every play. This allows users to pass the ball into space, and move their play with total freedom. Gamers have to make their passes and lob to their teammates. In addition to the control feature, a generic "Shot and Stamina Gauge" is shown with gameplay, giving shot and stamina details. Constantly sprinting will affect the player’s movements and will have an adverse effect on his stats, with passes going awry and a loss of pace.

Defending features were added including "New Defender AI" making defenders hold their positions naturally and no longer chasing balls that enter their area and forcing them into a mistake. "Improved Goalkeeping" was the second part to the defense features, adding players more control over their goalkeepers for more saves and accuracy.

"Animation and Player Physics" adds players moving with more natural movements and acceleration. The physical looks of players is also improved. Excessive movement now looks much better, while there is a larger variety of convincing tackling styles. Realistic animation also adds to the atmosphere, as players move better. A new "Speed of Play" makes for a more considered pace. The game speeds up at vital moments, and it is harder to make run from midfield, and good play will depend on making passes to make room.

A similar "Aesthtics" feature enhances facial animation. Aspects for player movement have been modified with more plays and interaction. The way players speed up and slow down is also more natural, while replays display elements of disturbed motion. A new stadium editor known as "Stadium Editor" allows gamers to create stadiums. They can edit the stands by selecting preset built structures, colors, adboards, architecture and roofing of the stands, whether the terrain. Users can now choose the setting for the stadium. The user is given the option to specify a background layout, with a variety of both urban and rural backgrounds.

"Tactical and Strategy" allows players to mark their playing style every game. A new "drag and drop" mechanism that can be used in every aspect of team management has been implemented, not just substitutions or formation changes. These settings are also animated for better understanding of the plays that have been altered.

Many other new features include "Feint settings", offering many skills and turns and allows users to use moves on the right stick, making them very accessible. A new "Online Master League" offers online connection with players around the world.

Unlike the console versions, this version of Pro Evolution Soccer 2011 does not feature the Copa Santander Libertadores.

== Reception ==
Reception

Aggregate scores
Aggregator	Score
GameRankings	73.92%
Metacritic	73/100

Review scores
Publication	Score
Eurogamer	7/10
Game Informer	7/10
GamePro	4/5
GameRevolution	B−
GameSpot	7/10
IGN	8/10
Joystiq	3/5
Nintendo Life	6/10
Nintendo World Report	7.5/10
Official Nintendo Magazine	78%
The Guardian	4/5

The game was met with average reception upon release, as GameRankings gave it a score of 73.92%, while Metacritic gave it 73 out of 100.
