= Steel Diver =

2011 video game

- Packaging artwork released for all territories
- Developers: Nintendo EAD; Vitei
- Publisher: Nintendo
- Director: Takaya Imamura
- Producer: Tadashi Sugiyama
- Designers: Takao Kurebayashi; Shigeru Miyamoto
- Programmer: Giles Goddard
- Artists: Takaya Imamura; Masahiko Murakami; Hiroki Ishibashi
- Composers: Atsuko Asahi; Toru Minegishi
- Platform: Nintendo 3DS
- Release: NA: March 27, 2011; EU: May 6, 2011; AU: May 12, 2011; JP: May 12, 2011
- Genre: Submarine simulator
- Modes: Single-player, multiplayer

Steel Diver is a 2011 submarine simulation video game developed by Nintendo and Vitei and published by Nintendo for the Nintendo 3DS. It was released in March 2011 as a launch title for the console in North America, with releases in Europe, Australia, and Japan, coming in May the same year. In the game, the player controls a submarine via a set of touch-screen based levers and wheels.

Steel Diver received generally mixed reviews from critics. A sequel, Steel Diver: Sub Wars, was released in 2014 via the Nintendo eShop.

== Story ==
In the year 19XX, a 'power-hungry rogue nation' invaded several nearby countries. A secret organization known as the 'Steel Divers' was formed from various countries' navies to combat this threat. The Steel Divers travel through various areas including Arctic and jungle settings and are eventually tasked with destroying the enemy stronghold. In the last mission of the original Steel Diver, the final boss of the game was the Giant Z-Class submarine. The front hull of this sub is placed with spikes, although this probably serves to intimidate enemies, because in-game it has no mechanical purpose.

== Gameplay ==
Steel Diver consists of 3 main modes: Missions, Periscope Strike, and Steel Commander. Missions is further broken down into 2 modes: Campaign and Time Trials. The main gameplay occurs during Campaign. In Campaign, the player uses sliders and dials on the touchscreen to manoeuver a submarine through side-scrolling levels displayed on the top screen, sinking enemy submarines, battleships and avoiding naval mines and depth charges as required. There are seven missions available, playable with different subs and difficulty modes, which usually involve goals such as eliminating enemy fleets or infiltrating enemy bases by reaching the goal in a time limit. Time Trials features the same gameplay style and controls, however the levels are shorter and are not connected to the story, instead being solely to achieve a fast time through a complex path. Periscope Strike mode is played after every successful mission or can also be played separately, or as part of Steel Commander. This mode sees the player moving the system to rotate a periscope to fire torpedoes at enemy ships. Steel Commander is playable against the CPU or a human opponent via Download Play. It is a strategy game in which the two players command a fleet of battleships and submarines and try to sink each other's fleet.

== Development ==
At E3 2004, Steel Diver was first shown as a playable tech demo for the then-upcoming Nintendo DS. The concept of a sub game, however, was, according to Shigeru Miyamoto "Long before that" and stems from his desire to make a flight sim. Even though he had created Pilotwings which has some similar aspects to the genre, Miyamoto was not fully satisfied with its simulation aspects. He noted that in a true flight simulator players "should be flying a huge passenger aircraft instead of, say, a fighter jet." He also noted that a submarine was similarly big and bulky and thought that the subject might work for a simulation game. He had considered developing the game for a system before the Nintendo DS, but soon realized that the control system for such a game would be less than ideal. Even though the tech demo at E3 2004 had good buzz Miyamoto was unable to expand on the idea until late in the DS's life due to scheduling conflict. When a team was finally able to be allocated to the project the 3DS specifications became known to him at which point he felt the game would work better as a 3DS title.

Six years after the DS demo Nintendo revealed the game at E3 2010, as a launch title for the Nintendo 3DS. The game was developed by Nintendo's Entertainment Analysis and Development division in cooperation with the external company Vitei. It was released in North America on March 27, 2011, where it was one of the first games for the Nintendo 3DS. However, it did not make the Japanese and European launch window. The game was released in Europe on May 6, 2011, and in Japan and Australia on May 12, 2011.

== Steel Diver: Sub Wars ==
Steel Diver: Sub Wars
- Artwork released for all territories
- Developers: Nintendo EAD; Vitei
- Publisher: Nintendo
- Director: Takaya Imamura
- Producer: Tadashi Sugiyama
- Designer: Takao Kurebayashi
- Programmers: Daniel Wright; Nathan Heckel; Shintaro Iguchi
- Artists: Takaya Imamura; Ryo Koizumi; Ryota Kanno
- Composers: Kenta Nagata; Atsuko Asahi; Toru Minegishi
- Platform: Nintendo 3DS
- Release: WW: February 13, 2014
- Genre: submarine simulation
- Modes: Single-player, multiplayer

In June 2013, it was announced that Nintendo was working on their first free-to-play game, which would be based on Steel Diver, to be released by March 2014. This was ultimately revealed to be titled Steel Diver: Sub Wars during the Nintendo Direct on February 13, 2014, which released after the event for the Nintendo 3DS. Sub Wars is a first-person game featuring a free-to-play online multiplayer mode and two levels of the single player campaign, with additional features and missions available to the paid version. The game supports a range of control schemes including the Circle Pad Pro and touch screen for many inputs. Reviews have been mostly positive.

On March 27, 2023, the game and its downloadable content were no longer purchasable due to the Nintendo eShop discontinuation.

On September 4, 2023, Nintendo indefinitely halted online play for Steel Diver: Sub Wars for "emergency maintenance." A month later on October 4, 2023, Nintendo announced the discontinuation of online services for Nintendo 3DS. On January 24, 2024, Nintendo announced that the servers were not going to be restored.

=== Reception ===
Reception

Aggregate score
Aggregator	Score
Metacritic	70/100

Review scores
Publication	Score
4Players	45/100
Destructoid	6/10
IGN	7.8/10
Nintendo Life	8/10
Nintendo World Report	7.5/10
Official Nintendo Magazine	79%

== Reception ==
Reception

Aggregate scores
Aggregator	Score
GameRankings	62%
Metacritic	58/100

Review scores
Publication	Score
1Up.com	C+
Computer and Video Games	7/10
Edge	5/10
Eurogamer	6/10
Game Informer	4/10
GamePro	3/5
GameSpot	4.5/10
GamesRadar+	3/5
GamesTM	7/10
GameTrailers	6.2/10
IGN	7.0/10
Joystiq	3.5/5
NGamer	7/10
Nintendo Life	6/10
Nintendo Power	4/5
Nintendo World Report	7/10
Official Nintendo Magazine	61%
PALGN	6.5/10
Play	37%
Pocket Gamer	3/5
The Guardian	3/5
VideoGamer.com	4/10

Steel Diver has received mixed reviews. IGN's Audrey Drake gave Steel Diver a 7 out of 10, praising it for its addictive gameplay, but gave caution that the slow-paced strategy is not for everyone. Contrarily, Game Informer gave the game a 4 out of 10, praising its music and sound, but criticizing the multi-player and the knob-moving game play during a time limit and chaotic levels. Official Nintendo Magazine awarded it 61%, criticizing its lack of content, saying, "Wait until the price dives for the depths before you consider a purchase." GameSpot awarded it a score of 4.5 out of 10, saying "Steel Diver never figures out if it wants to be a submarine simulation or an action romp, and that indecision leads to a yawn-inducing experience."
