= Giles Goddard (video game programmer) =

English video game programmer

- Born: 30 March 1971 (age 55)
- Occupations: Video game programmer, CEO of Vitei and Chuhai Labs

Giles Goddard (born 30 March 1971) is an English video game programmer. He was one of the first Western employees at Nintendo, programming the Mario face in Super Mario 64, and working on titles such as Star Fox, 1080° Snowboarding, and Steel Diver. In 2002, he founded Vitei, a video game developer based in Kyoto, Japan, and is CEO.

== Career ==
=== Argonaut Games ===
Giles Goddard's interest in computers began when he was a teenager, when he used his ZX Spectrum, and later Amiga, to create demoscene works in his spare time. In his Amiga demos, he experimented with 3D wireframe graphics with filled polygons. During this time, Argonaut Software released Starglider 2, one of the first computer games to use filled polygons. Goddard soon left school before finishing his A-levels and joined Argonaut Games, where his first task was porting Starglider 2 to the Macintosh SE. Argonaut would develop a reputation for creating cutting-edge, 3D games. They produced a 3D graphics demo for the Nintendo Entertainment System and collaborated with Nintendo to produce the Game Boy title X, one of the few Game Boy games with 3D graphics.

=== Nintendo ===
When Goddard was 18 or 19, he moved to Kyoto to work for Nintendo, where he, alongside fellow Argonaut employee Dylan Cuthbert, helped develop Star Fox and Stunt Race FX. Goddard remained with Nintendo during the Nintendo 64 era. He assisted with the demo of Link fighting an enemy, which would be shown at the Shoshinkai 1995 trade show. To show off skinning, he programmed the interactive Mario face in Super Mario 64 by attaching painted ping-pong balls to his face and using an Indy camera to track movement. His next project, 1080° Snowboarding, saw him as one of the two lead programmers, alongside fellow Argonaut colleague Collin Reed. This game used frame interpolation and inverse kinematics to make character movement feel more realistic.

=== VITEI BACKROOM, Inc / Chuhai Labs ===
Afterwards, Goddard left Nintendo and became a freelancer, porting Doshin the Giant from the Nintendo 64DD to the GameCube. In 2002, Goddard founded the Japanese video game developer Vitei, Inc. as a Nintendo second-party studio. Vitei produced its first game, the Japan-exclusive Nintendo DS title Theta, in 2007, and the WiiWare title Rock N' Roll Climber in 2009. He was the head programmer for Steel Diver, and Vitei would also develop its sequel, Steel Diver: Sub Wars, as well as Tank Troopers. In 2020, Vitei Backroom was rebranded as Chuhai Labs to expand into micro-publishing and to position the company to be more forward facing. Chuhai Labs developed Carve Snowboarding, which launched on 27 May 2021. Carve Snowboarding is a virtual reality-focused spiritual successor to 1080° Snowboarding for Oculus Quest.
