= Tadashi Sugiyama =

Japanese video game designer (born 1959)

- 杉山 直
- Born: April 15, 1959 (age 67); Kyoto, Japan
- Occupations: Video game designer, producer
- Years active: 1983–present
- Employer: Nintendo
- Title: Manager at Nintendo EAD (2003–2015)

Tadashi Sugiyama (杉山 直, Sugiyama Tadashi; born April 15, 1959) is a Japanese video game designer and producer. Sugiyama joined Nintendo in 1983, and served as one of the original young design staff for Nintendo's creative department. Sugiyama contributed graphic design to several games and worked with several notable Nintendo staff, including Mario series creator Shigeru Miyamoto and the late president Satoru Iwata. Sugiyama originally worked as a graphic designer and character artist on several early Famicom titles. One of his early famous creations were the character designs of Popo and Nana from Ice Climber. Sugiyama went on to co-direct Zelda II: The Adventure of Link. Sugiyama was also one of the central designers working on Miyamoto's GBA-GCN Connectivity experiments, most of which never saw release.

== Ludography ==
Year	Title	Credit(s)	Ref.
1983	Baseball	Graphic artist	
1984	Clu Clu Land	Graphic artist	
1985	Ice Climber	Graphic artist	
1987	Zelda II: The Adventure of Link	Director	
1987	Yume Kōjō: Doki Doki Panic	Character designer	
1988	Super Mario Bros. 2	Character designer	
1990	Pilotwings	Director	
1992	Super Mario Kart	Director, CG artist	
1993	Super Mario All-Stars	Assistant director, graphic artist	
1996	Mario Kart 64	Art director	
1998	F-Zero X	Director	
2000	F-Zero X Expansion Kit	Director	
2001	Mario Kart: Super Circuit	Supervisor	
2001	Luigi's Mansion	Art director	
2002	The Legend of Zelda: The Wind Waker	Supervisor	
2003	Mario Kart: Double Dash	Producer	
2004	Mario vs. Donkey Kong	Advisor	
2007	Picross DS	Supervisor	
2007	Super Paper Mario	Graphic supervisor	
2007	Wii Fit	Producer	
2009	Wii Fit Plus	Producer	
2011	Steel Diver	Producer	
2011	Star Fox 64 3D	Producer	
2013	Wii Fit U	Producer	
2014	Steel Diver: Sub Wars	Producer	
2016	Star Fox Zero	Producer	
2016	Star Fox Guard	Producer	
2016	Tank Troopers	Producer	

== Interviews ==
- Iwata Asks: Wii Fit - Development Staff Interview..
