= Soundelux Design Music Group =

Coordinates: 34.1009°N 118.3446°W

- Company type: Recording studio
- Industry: Video game
- Founded: 1985; Hollywood, California, United States
- Headquarters: Hollywood, California, United States
- Products: Video games
- Owner: Todd Soundelux
- Parent: Soundelux

Soundelux Design Music Group is an American sound studio located in Hollywood, California.

Soundelux Design Music Group specializes in sound design, music composition and voiceover recording for video games. It is part of Todd Soundelux, formerly known as CSS Studios, LLC.

In December 2013, Soundelux Design Music Group was merged with another studio, POP Sound, with POP Sound being the surviving company in the merger.

== Games credits ==
2014

- Bayonetta 2 - Nintendo / PlatinumGames

2013

- Metal Gear Rising: Revengeance - Konami / PlatinumGames
- Skylanders: Swap Force - Activision
- The Wonderful 101 - Nintendo / PlatinumGames

2012

- Kid Icarus: Uprising - Nintendo
- PlayStation All-Stars Battle Royale - Sony Computer Entertainment

2011

- Ace Combat: Assault Horizon - Namco Bandai

2010

- Final Fantasy XIV - Square Enix
- God of War III - Sony Computer Entertainment
- Lost Planet 2 - Capcom
- Metal Gear Solid: Peace Walker - Konami
- Professor Layton and the Unwound Future - Nintendo
- Vanquish - Sega / PlatinumGames

2009

- Bayonetta - Sega / PlatinumGames
- Resident Evil 5 - Capcom
- Resistance: Retribution - Sony Computer Entertainment

2008

- Bionic Commando - Capcom
- Dead Space - EA
- Fable II - Lionhead Studios
- God of War: Chains of Olympus - Sony Computer Entertainment
- Lost Planet: Colonies - Capcom
- Metal Gear Solid 4: Guns of the Patriots - Konami
- Super Smash Bros. Brawl - Nintendo / Sora Ltd. (Metal Gear Solid characters only)

2007

- Age of Empires: The Asian Dynasties - Ensemble Studios/Microsoft
- Assassin's Creed - Ubisoft
- Crysis - Crytek
- God of War II - Sony Computer Entertainment
- Golden Compass - F9E/Sega
- Devil May Cry 4 - Capcom
- Hannah Montana - Disney Interactive Studios
- High School Musical - Disney Interactive
- Lair - Sony Computer Entertainment
- Metal Gear Solid: Portable Ops - Konami
- Monster Hunter Freedom 2 - Capcom
- No More Heroes - Ubisoft / Grasshopper Manufacture
- Pirates of the Caribbean: At World's End - Disney Interactive Studios
- Pirates of the Caribbean Online - Disney VR Studio
- Stranglehold - Midway
- Surf's Up - Ubisoft
- Syphon Filter: Logan's Shadow - Sony Computer Entertainment
- Transformers: The Game - Activision

2006

- Dead Rising - Capcom
- Final Fight: Streetwise - Capcom
- God Hand - Capcom / Clover Studio
- Lost Planet: Extreme Condition - Capcom
- Marc Eckō's Getting Up: Contents Under Pressure - Atari
- Marvel: Ultimate Alliance - Activision
- Monster Hunter 2 - Capcom
- Onimusha: Dawn Of Dreams - Capcom
- Pirates of the Caribbean: Dead Man's Chest - Disney Interactive Studios
- SOCOM U.S. Navy Seals: Combined Assault - Sony Computer Entertainment
- SOCOM U.S. Navy Seals: Fireteam Bravo 2 - Sony Computer Entertainment
- Star Trek: Legacy - Bethesda Softworks
- Syphon Filter: Dark Mirror - Sony Computer Entertainment
- The Fast and the Furious - Namco Bandai
- The Lord of the Rings: The Battle for Middle-earth II - Electronic Arts

2005

- Ape Escape 3 - Sony Computer Entertainment
- Ape Escape: On the Loose - Sony Computer Entertainment
- Area 51 - Midway
- Devil May Cry 3: Dante's Awakening - Capcom
- God of War - Sony Computer Entertainment
- Haunting Ground - Capcom
- Killer7 - Capcom / Grasshopper Manufacture
- Lineage II: The Chaotic Chronicle - NC Soft
- Mortal Kombat: Shaolin Monks - Midway
- Need For Speed: Most Wanted - Electronic Arts
- Resident Evil 4 - Capcom
- Samurai Western - Atlus
- Viewtiful Joe: Red Hot Rumble - Capcom / Clover Studio

2004

- Chaos Legion - Capcom
- Everquest 2 - SOE
- Gungrave: Overdose - Mastiff
- Maximo vs. Army of Zin - Capcom
- Shadow Ops: Red Mercury - Zombie Entertainment/Atari
- SD Gundam Force: Showdown! - Bandai
- The Chronicles of Riddick: Escape from Butcher Bay - Vivendi Universal Games
- The Lord of the Rings: Battle for Middle Earth - Electronic Arts
- Viewtiful Joe 2 - Capcom / Clover Studio

2003

- Arc the Lad: Twilight of the Spirits - Sony Computer Entertainment
- Devil May Cry 2 - Capcom
- P.N.03 - Capcom
- Terminator 3: Rise of the Machines - Atari
- Toontown Online - Disney VR Studio
- Viewtiful Joe - Capcom

2002

- Dark Cloud 2 - Sony Computer Entertainment
- La Pucelle: Tactics - Mastiff
- Red Faction II - THQ
- Resident Evil - Capcom
- Steel Battalion - Capcom / Nude Maker

2001

- Devil May Cry - Capcom
- Anachronox - Ion Storm

Notable Classics

- Mechwarrior 2: 31st Century Combat - Activision
- Descent - Interplay
- Pitfall: The Mayan Adventure - Activision
