= Viewtiful Joe (TV series) =

Japanese anime television series

- Viewtiful Joe Volume 1 DVD cover

ビューティフル ジョー (Byūtifuru Jō)
- Genre: Action, comedy, superhero
- Created by: Capcom; Clover Studio; Hideki Kamiya
- Anime television series
- Directed by: Takaaki Ishiyama
- Written by: GGB
- Music by: Takehiko Itsukida; Yūsuke Hayashi
- Studio: Group TAC
- Licensed by: NA: Geneon Entertainment
- Original network: TXN (TV Tokyo)
- English network: UK: Jetix; US: Kids' WB!
- Original run: October 2, 2004 – September 24, 2005
- Episodes: 51 (Japanese); 26 (English)

Viewtiful Joe (Note: Japanese: ビューティフル ジョー, Hepburn: Byūtifuru Jō) is an anime series based on the video game series of the same name. The series loosely adapts the first two titles in the series, Viewtiful Joe and Viewtiful Joe 2, while introducing several original characters and scenarios. The series, comprising fifty-one episodes, was shown every Saturday on the Japanese television station TV Tokyo from October 2, 2004, until September 24, 2005. The show was licensed by anime distributor Geneon Entertainment, with its first twenty-six episodes airing in the United States on Kids' WB. It was taken off the air when the block was moved to The CW.

Viewtiful Joe was later licensed for distribution in other parts of the world by MGM Television. The anime debuted in the United Kingdom on Jetix on July 2, 2007. Viewtiful Joe premiered on Cartoon Network Brazil on July 3, 2006, and ran again in the country's RedeTV! in HD on November 27, 2006. It aired in Mexico starting on July 4, 2006. On June 23, 2008, the show began airing on Cartoon Network in other parts of Latin America. In 2009, Viewtiful Joe became available on Crunchyroll's streaming service for its users outside Asia.

== Plot ==
Following the games' storyline, movie lover Joe and his girlfriend Silvia enjoy a seemingly normal trip to the movies to see an action flick starring Joe's idol, Captain Blue, when suddenly the leader of the evil Jadow force reaches out of the screen and takes Silvia into the movie. Joe is forced to follow her by Captain Blue's mecha, Six Machine (renamed "Machine Six" in the English anime dub), and meets Captain Blue in the flesh who grants Joe the power to become an action movie hero in his own right called Viewtiful Joe.

== Characters ==
- Joe: He is a fanboy of movies who gets to live his dream as Viewtiful Joe while he saves Silvia from Jadow. He assumes his superhero outfit via the catchphrase "Henshin-a-Go-Go, Baby!!" He is often distracted by double cheeseburgers and doesn't take a lot of things seriously.
- Silvia: Joe's love interest and partner. In the beginning of the series, she is abducted by Jadow for their evil plan to succeed. After Jadow's defeat, Silvia obtains a V-Watch from Captain Blue so she can team up with Joe as Sexy Silvia (renamed Go-Go Silvia in the English anime dub) instead of being the "damsel-in-distress".
- Junior: Another self-proclaimed hero worshipper like Joe, only younger. He lives in Blue Town, which was named after Captain Blue, serving as its protector Captain Blue Jr. Despite his jealousy for Joe being Blue's successor, Junior decides to become Joe's sidekick and offers his knowledge of Movieland as a helping hand. As the series progresses into the Gedow arc, Junior receives the V-Yoyos from Captain Blue, assuming his new superhero outfit via the phrase "Henshin-a-Yo-Yo, Baby!!"
- Captain Blue: Joe's idol and mentor. He gives Joe the V-Watch which enables him to use his VFX powers. In season two, he is transformed into the "Captain Blue Device" by the Black Emperor, which Gedow uses to create monsters. The Black Emperor gave him the scar on his face.
- Alastor: An agent of Jadow that uses the nicknames "The Midnight Thunder Boy" and "Blade Master." Though he is helping Jadow, Alastor doesn't care about their goals, but instead seeks out the ultimate battle, and can be considered an antihero to an extent. He considers himself Joe's rival, despite questioning Joe's methods. Alastor has the habit of watching over Joe during his adventures through Movieland and the two tend to act more like friends rather than enemies, becoming a perfect example of text-book frenemies. He is also the one who gives Joe the inspiration for his hero name. During Fire Leo's fight with Joe, Alastor restrains Fire Leo as they both fall into the void that surrounds Jadow headquarters, but Alastor promises to survive so he and Joe can finally settle their rivalry. Following the event, Alastor loses his powers and can only restore them by a solar eclipse. During this time, he appears in his normal form giving the heroes advice and sometimes help in fights. His power is restored to him during a solar eclipse.
- Sprocket: Coordinator of Jadow and second in command of the organization. She is one of the few characters who is actually from the real world, being a member of Blue's film crew who was pulled into Movieland. She is annoyed with the antics and incompetence of Jadow's henchmen Charles III, Hulk Davidson, and Gran Bruce. When Jadow is brought down, she joins up with Gedow alongside Charles, Hulk, and Bruce.
- Almighty Leader: The leader of Jadow, the antagonistic organization of the anime's first season. When Joe manages to infiltrate Jadow headquarters, he finds Silvia, only to see her abducted by the evil leader. Once Joe reaches the stadium, "Almighty Leader" is revealed to be none other than Captain Blue, who attempts to break Joe's spirit and thus devastate Joe mentally before destroying him physically. But the words of those Joe had befriended in his adventures enables Joe's confidence to return and fight back against Blue. Piloting the King Blue giant robot, Blue is defeated by Joe in Six Majin.
- The Black Emperor: Leader of Gedow, the invading alien organization of the anime's second season whose goal is to use their various monsters and foot soldiers to corrupt a movie and alter the ending, causing the film to radiate with darkness. The Black Emperor is a superhero named Jet Black, Joe's father, owner of the theater and Captain Blue's best friend, who was turned evil by the Black V-Watch and the Black Film. He is freed from the Black Film's corruption by Joe and Silvia. In episode 50, it is confirmed he gave Captain Blue his scar with a swipe of his blade.

== Media ==
=== Anime ===
Viewtiful Joe was produced by animation company Group TAC. The producer for the video game franchise, Atsushi Inaba, and his team gave Group TAC its character designs for the video games, as well as original character designs for the animated series. The main cast includes Tomokazu Seki, Natsuko Kuwatani, Makoto Tsumura, Mayumi Asano, Shin-ichiro Miki and Banjō Ginga.

The English version of the anime features voice acting by Jason Palmer, Philece Sampler, Mona Marshall, and Wendee Lee, among others. Bob Papenbrook, under the name John Smallberries, voiced Captain Blue for the show's first twenty-one English dubbed episodes. Papenbrook died on March 17, 2006, due to complications from a chronic lung condition, making Viewtiful Joe his final piece of work. He was replaced by Paul St. Peter for the remainder of the dub.

The U.S. broadcast began with the fifth episode, with the first three episodes not being shown until a month later. The show's pilot was localized in the United States by phuuz entertainment. A few censoring edits were made to the English dubbed version of Viewtiful Joe. In Brazil and Spain, the show was aired completely uncut. In the English version, the name of Joe's flying machine, Six Machine, was renamed in the English dub to Machine Six. There is speculation that it was renamed because its original name sounded close to the phrase "sex machine". Also, Six Majin was renamed to Robo-Six. Joe's middle finger was edited out in his henshin transformation sequence. Silvia's super hero alter ego is renamed from "Sexy Silvia" (which was also used in the games) to "Go-Go Silvia". Sprocket's jumpsuit is always zipped up completely, though it was originally unzipped (showing large amounts of cleavage) and one of her signature moves was to zip it up. This move was eliminated in the dub by cutting out the scenes, resulting in Sprocket having much less screen time than in the original.

Episodes of the series have been released on both DVD and UMD. In North America, Geneon partnered with Kids Foot Locker to promote the show by including DVDs with purchases at the shoe retailer.

=== CDs ===
The Japanese version of Viewtiful Joe features music composed by Takehiko Gokita and Yuusuke Hayashi. The show features two opening themes by the band SaGa. The song "Brighter Side" is used for the first thirty-eight episodes and the song "Spirit Awake" is used for the remaining episodes. "Brighter Side" is also used in the English version of the show. The Japanese version also features the ending theme "And You" by SaGa for the first thirty-eight episodes, and "Tougenkyou" (also known as Shangri-La Village) by Amasia Landscape for the remainder. A 36-track CD was released by Geneon on February 7, 2006, and contains the anime's music, as well as the bonus track "Viewtiful World" from the first Viewtiful Joe game.

SaGa released two CD singles of their vocal songs in Viewtiful Joe. The first one was released on March 30, 2005, and features both the Japanese and English versions of "Brighter Side" and "And You", as well as a DVD containing one music clip and the opening and ending Viewtiful Joe cinematics with the respective songs. The second single was released on August 31, 2005, and features both language versions of the songs "Spirit Awake" and "Wonder", as well as a DVD music clip of the former. In North America, a CD soundtrack was packaged with the first DVD volume.

=== Film books ===
Five film books for the anime were released by Capcom in early 2005. The books consist of manga-style panels of the show's storyline shown with screenshots.

== Reception ==
Geneon's press release of the third North American DVD and UMD release of Viewtiful Joe in early 2006 showed that the anime was the top-ranked show in its timeslot for the ages 2–11 Nielsen ratings demographic.

Reviews of Viewtiful Joe by various media outlets mostly agreed that the show is faithful to the video games on which it is based, but complained of its animation framerates and English localization. Matt Casamassina of IGN praised the Viewtiful Joe for staying true to its source material. He states, "[...] the episodes never stray too far from the original subject matter. As a result, anybody who played the Joe titles will have a sense of dējā vu as they watch these toons. Viewers who know the franchise's history will find no contradictions in these episodes - merely more back story, most of it entertaining." Despite his appreciation for its artwork, Casamassina was displeased with the show's lack of animation. This was concurred upon by Zac Bertschy of the Anime News Network (ANN), who was also very critical of the show's English dub, giving the first DVD volume an overall "F". Specifically, he found that the localization's attempt to be hip with a nearly constant use of slang in order to cater to younger audiences resulted in a "insultingly bad dub". Carlo Santos, also of ANN, had a similar opinion, and gave the second DVD volume an overall "D". He found fault not only in the voice acting, but the script writing as well. "Joe's vocabulary is all, like, totally, DUDE every time he opens his mouth, and when he's not hamming it up with unconvincing slang, he's spouting lines that are supposed to sound witty but aren't." Santos also noted the series as being too repetitive, but enjoyed the anime's character design, coloring, and visual style taken from the games. Buzz McClain of Video Business asserted that the show is "clearly influenced by the animation style of Hayao Miyazaki", and that its use of narrative is much more linear and easy to follow than other anime.
