= List of Capcom subsidiaries =

Apart from the head office building and the R&D building of Capcom Co., Ltd., both located in Chūō-ku, Osaka, the Japanese parent company also has a branch office in the Shinjuku Mitsui Building in Nishi-Shinjuku, Shinjuku, Tokyo. It also has the Ueno Facility. a branch office in Iga, Mie Prefecture. The international Capcom Group currently encompasses 15 subsidiaries in Japan, North America, Europe, and East Asia. Affiliated companies include Koko Capcom Co., Ltd. in South Korea, Street Fighter Film, LLC in the United States, and Dellgamadas Co., Ltd.

== Current subsidiaries ==
Subsidiary	Established	Location	Details
Capcom U.S.A., Inc.	August 1985	San Mateo, California	wholly owned subsidiary of Capcom Co., Ltd.; holding company administering subsidiaries in the United States, and the Street Fighter IP
Capcom Asia Co., Ltd.	July 1993	Hong Kong	selling home video games in the Asia-Pacific region.; handles translation/subtitling of various Capcom games sold in the Asia-Pacific region in various languages, such as Chinese and Korean.
Capcom Entertainment, Inc.	June 1995	San Mateo	wholly owned subsidiary of Capcom U.S.A., Inc.; established to enhance and maximize management, distribution, and R&D in the United States
CE Europe Ltd.	November 2002	London	selling home video games
CEG Entertainment Germany GmbH	February 2003	Hamburg	selling home video games
Capcom Mobile	May 2006	Toronto	wholly owned subsidiary of Capcom Interactive, Inc.; developing and distributing mobile phone games; originally an unrelated developer known as Cosmic Infinity, Inc. before it was acquired by Capcom, then renamed as Capcom Interactive Canada, Inc and Beeline Interactive.; officially absorbed into main company and rebranded as Capcom Mobile on April 1, 2016
Capcom Interactive, Inc.	June 2006	Los Angeles	wholly owned subsidiary of Capcom U.S.A., Inc.; distributing mobile phone games and integrating the wireless, online and console sectors
Blue Harvest LLC	FY 2007		wholly owned subsidiary of Capcom Co., Ltd.; developing video games
K2 Co., Ltd.	May 2008	Osaka	developing home video games; originally an unrelated developer before it became a wholly owned subsidiary of Capcom Co., Ltd. through a stock exchange
Capcom Entertainment France, SAS	July 2008	Saint-Germain-en-Laye	wholly owned subsidiary of CE Europe Ltd.; selling home video games
Enterrise Co., Ltd.	July 2008	Tokyo	90% of shares owned by Capcom Co., Ltd.; developing, manufacturing and distributing arcade machines, in particular, pachinko and pachislot
Capcom Taiwan Co., Ltd.	August 2012	Taipei	Operation and development of online games as well as development and distribution of mobile phone games; handles operations for marketing Capcom games in China.
Capcom Philippines., Inc.	August 2012	Cebu, Philippines	wholly owned subsidiary of Capcom Co., Ltd.; holding company administering subsidiaries in the Philippines
Swordcanes Studio Co., Ltd.	May 2018	Tokyo	wholly owned subsidiary of Capcom Co., Ltd.; production of 3D and 2D computer graphics related to game development
Minimum Studios Co., Ltd.	August 2018	Taipei	wholly owned subsidiary of Capcom Co., Ltd.; production of animation related to game development
Capcom Maintenance Service Co., Ltd.	April 2018	Osaka	Rent, lease and operation of real estate properties
Capcom Singapore Pte. Ltd.	April 2020	Singapore	handles publishing of games for Southeast Asia.
Adelion Co., Ltd.	April 2020	Tokyo	Sale and Manufacture of amusement equipment
Capcom Pictures, Inc.	April 2022	California	Planning and production management of motion pictures
Swordcanes Studio Co., Ltd.	July 2023	Tokyo	Production of 3D and 2D computer graphics related to game development
Leostar Co., Ltd.	April 2024	Tokyo	Sale and Manufacture of amusement equipment
Minimum Studios Co., Ltd.	July 2024	Taiwan	Production of animation related to game development

== Former subsidiaries ==
Subsidiary	Established	Closed/acquired	Location	Details
A.C.A. Co., Ltd.			Mito	
Status Co., Ltd.		FY 2003	Osaka	non-life insurance agency also responsible for financial activities; closed for the purpose of achieving a sound financial structure
Captron Co., Ltd.	February 1991	April 1, 2018	Osaka	wholly owned subsidiary of Capcom Co., Ltd.; renting, leasing, and operating real estate properties; originally a related company known as Yunika Co., Ltd.; absorbed into Capcom Co., Ltd. in 2018
Capcom Europe GmbH	February 1992	FY 2002	Düsseldorf	managed sales in Europe; closed
Capcom Mexico S.A. DE C.V.	October 1993	FY 1997	Mexico City	sold products in Mexico, Central and South America; closed for the purpose of improving the company's financial balance
Capcom Coin-Op, Inc.	June 1995	March 2004	Sunnyvale, California, Arlington Heights, IL	wholly owned subsidiary of Capcom U.S.A., Inc.; developed and sold pinball and arcade game machines, converted games for US market and operated amusement facilities; closed
Capcom Studio 8, Inc.	June 1995	March 2007	Sunnyvale	originally established as Capcom Digital Studios, Inc., a wholly owned subsidiary of Capcom U.S.A., Inc.; also known as Production Studio 8; developed video games; acquired by Capcom Entertainment, Inc.
Flagship Co., Ltd.	April 1997	June 2007	Osaka	co-founded by four people, among them game designer Yoshiki Okamoto and screenwriter Noboru Sugimura; established for the purpose of enhancing the quality of game scenarios with the help of screenwriters experienced in the creation of film and television scripts; Okamoto and some other staff members left the company in 2003 to form Game Republic, Inc., while Sugimura died in early 2005; company employed about 30 people and was acquired by Capcom Co., Ltd.
Capcom Eurosoft, Ltd.	July 1998	April 2007	London	was the main base for the sale of home video games in Europe; wholly owned subsidiary of Capcom Entertainment, Inc.; closed with all operations transferred to CE Europe Ltd.
Capcom Charbo Co., Ltd.	September 2001	January 31, 2009	Osaka	wholly owned subsidiary of Capcom Co., Ltd. before its closing; offered support services for communication tools like mobile phones
Capcom Entertainment Korea Co., Ltd.	May 5, 2007	2019	Seoul	First established as Koko Capcom in 2006.; wholly owned subsidiary of Capcom Co., Ltd.; selling home video games, and operating and developing online games; Capcom's Korean websites were removed from the internet with Korean translation/subtitling done by the Asian branch as of 2019.
Daletto Co., Ltd.	October 2006	March 28, 2011	Tokyo	co-founded by Capcom Co., Ltd. and Dwango Co., Ltd.; managing a virtual theme park website, and operating and developing online games; Merged completely into Capcom and dissolved
Clover Studio Co., Ltd.	July 2004	March 2007	Osaka	spun off from the R&D department of Capcom Co., Ltd.; originally known as Production Studio 9; developed video games; closed; notable personnel, including Atsushi Inaba, Shinji Mikami and Hideki Kamiya, moved on to found Seeds Inc.
Capcom Vancouver	August 2010	September 2018	Vancouver, British Columbia, Canada	Originally known as Blue Castle Games. Rebranded as Capcom Vancouver after acquisition.
