= Mikey Kelley =

American voice actor (born 1973)

- Born: November 14, 1973 (age 52); Quincy, Massachusetts, U.S.
- Education: Emerson College
- Occupation: Voice actor
- Years active: 1996–present
- Website: mikeykelley.com

Mikey Kelley (born November 14, 1973) is an American voice actor, who is best known for his role as Michelangelo in the animated film TMNT (2007), Silver Surfer in The Super Hero Squad Show, David Carter in Invasion America, Joey Caruso in Everybody Still Hates Chris, and Higgins in Elena of Avalor.

== Early life ==
Mikey Kelley was born and raised in Quincy, Massachusetts. He attended Emerson College in Boston where he received a degree in Mass Communications/TV production.

== Career ==
Kelley landed his first major voice-over job when he was cast as the lead in Steven Spielberg's primetime animated series Invasion America for The WB Network.

He has since lent his voice to several other TV and film projects including TMNT, Everybody Still Hates Chris, Transformers: Robots in Disguise, Elena of Avalor, Mystic River, Harvey Beaks, Scooby-Doo and the Cyber Chase, The Super Hero Squad Show, Kulipari: An Army of Frogs, Batman: The Brave and the Bold, The Stinky & Dirty Show, Rocket Power, The Land Before Time, The Adventures of Puss in Boots, New Looney Tunes, as well as many others.

On the commercial front, he's worked on a host of television and radio campaigns. He was the announcer for the Toon Disney cable channel from 2007 to 2009.

Kelley has also been featured in a variety of video games including Lego Jurassic World, Halo 3, Tony Hawk's Underground, Ratchet & Clank, Full Spectrum Warrior, Viewtiful Joe, Metal Gear Solid: Portable Ops, Final Fantasy XIII-2, Lego Star Wars: The Force Awakens, Saints Row and many others.

== Filmography ==
=== Film ===
List of voice performances in feature films
Year	Title	Role	Notes
2001	Scooby-Doo and the Cyber Chase	Bill McLemore	
2003	Mystic River	Walkie-Talkie voice	
2004	Dirty Dancing: Havana Nights	Additional voices	
2004	Confessions of a Teenage Drama Queen	Additional voices	
2004	Soul Plane	Additional voices	
2005	Undiscovered	Additional voices	
2005	Hitch	Additional voices	
2005	The Game of Their Lives	Additional voices	
2005	Roll Bounce	Additional voices	
2005	Mr. & Mrs. Smith	Additional voices	
2007	TMNT	Michelangelo	
2010	The Fighter	Bar Patron voice	
2014	The Equalizer	Additional Voices	
2014	When Marnie Was There	Takeshi	
2016	Norm of the North	Henchman #2	
2017	Cars 3	Additional voices	
2017	All Eyes on Me	Boxing Announcer	
2019	The Highwaymen	Clyde	
2019	Birds of a Feather	Luc	
2026	Treasure Trekkers	Catz	

=== Television ===
List of voice performances in television shows
Year	Title	Role	Notes
1997	Extreme Ghostbusters	Spence	Episode: "True Face of a Monster
1998	Invasion America	David Carter	13 episodes
2000	Godzilla: The Series	Steven	Episode: "Shafted"
2002	Static Shock	Nick Connor	Episode: "Jimmy"
2002	Julius and Friends	Cornelius, Texan	
2002	Rocket Power	Harry	Episode: "Beach Boyz and a Girl/X-Treme Ideas"
2004	What's New, Scooby-Doo?	Monroe Hopper	Episode: "Uncle Scooby and Antarctica"
2004	All Grown Up!	Daniel	Episode: "Fear of Falling"
2005	Firehouse USA: Boston	Narrator	8 episodes
2006	Star Trek: Enterprise	Additional Voices	
2006	Ben 10	Gang #2, Attendant, Helicopter Pilot	Episode: "Kevin 11"
2006	Gilmore Girls	Additional Voices	
2006	Shorty McShorts' Shorts	Skylar	3 episodes
2006	Loonatics Unleashed	Rip Runner	Episode: "The Family Business"
2006	My Stupid Cat	Trevor	
2006	Brotherhood	Additional voices	
2007	King of the Hill	Additional voices	2 episodes
2007	Man Caves	Narrator	3 episodes
2008	The Land Before Time	Hyp	Episode: "The Great Egg Adventure"
2009–11	Batman: The Brave and the Bold	Batman / Bruce Wayne (young), Kamandi	4 episodes
2009–11	The Super Hero Squad Show	Silver Surfer, Dark Surfer, Young Scientist	33 episodes
2012	Phineas and Ferb	Additional voices	Episode: "Sipping with the Enemy/Tri-State Treasure: Boot of Secrets"
2012	Gravity Falls	Additional voices	Episode: "The Inconveniencing"
2014	Club Penguin: We Wish You a Merry Walrus	Blizzard	
2015	Club Penguin: Monster Beach Party	Blizzard	
2015	Club Penguin: Penguin Halloween Panic	Blizzard	
2015–16	The Adventures of Puss in Boots	Dom	3 episodes
2015, 2018	New Looney Tunes	Boyd	2 episodes
2016	2 Broke Girls	Police V.O.	Episode: "And the Great Escape"
2016	Kulipari: An Army of Frogs	Gee	13 episodes
2016	Superstore	Additional Voices	
2016–17	Harvey Beaks	The Inspiration	5 episodes
2016–20	Elena of Avalor	Higgins	12 episodes
2016–19	The Stinky & Dirty Show	Sweepy, Sparks	12 episodes
2017	Transformers: Robots in Disguise	Heatseaker, Heatmark, Opposing Captain	6 episodes
2022	Jurassic World Camp Cretaceous	Twin Mercenaries	3 episodes
2023	Winning Time: The Rise of the Lakers Dynasty	Additional Voices	Season 2
2024	Everybody Still Hates Chris	Joey Caruso	Season 1

=== Video games ===
List of voice performances in video games
Year	Title	Role	Notes
2001	Star Wars Rogue Squadron II: Rogue Leader	Rebel Wingman #1	
2002	Rocket Power: Beach Bandits	Tutorial	
2002	Ratchet & Clank	Ratchet	
2003	Viewtiful Joe	Alastor	
2003	Tony Hawk's Underground	Additional voices	
2004	Full Spectrum Warrior	Shimenski	
2004	Viewtiful Joe 2	Alastor	
2005	Viewtiful Joe: Red Hot Rumble	Alastor	
2006	Full Spectrum Warrior: Ten Hammers	Shimenski	
2006	Metal Gear Solid: Portable Ops	Fox Soldier A	
2007	Spider-Man 3	Additional voices	
2007	Skate	Additional voices	
2007	TMNT	Michaelangelo	
2007	Halo 3	Marines	
2008	CSI: NY	Additional voices	
2008	SOCOM U.S. Navy SEALs: Confrontation	Lionel Hutts	
2009	Halo 3: ODST	Marine #2	
2009	Infamous	Male Pedestrian	
2009	Marvel Super Hero Squad	Silver Surfer, Anti-Surfer	
2010	Marvel Super Hero Squad: The Infinity Gauntlet	Silver Surfer, Dark Silver Surfer	
2011	Operation Flashpoint: Red River	Marines	
2011	Marvel Super Hero Squad Online	Silver Surfer, Spider-Man	
2011	Final Fantasy XIII-2	Additional voices	
2011	Marvel Super Hero Squad: Comic Combat	Silver Surfer, Dark Surfer	
2012	Kinect Star Wars	Gold 3, NPCMaIPadawan, pad3, padMaI	
2012	Ratchet & Clank: Full Frontal Assault	Barry	
2013	Aliens: Colonial Marines	William Barnes	
2014	Sunset Overdrive	Additional voices	
2015	Mad Max	Additional voices	
2015	Lego Jurassic World	Additional voices	
2016	Lego Star Wars: The Force Awakens	Additional voices	
2017	Final Fantasy XV	Additional voices	
2019	Rage 2: Rise of the Ghosts	Ghost Shotgun/Metro Station Civilian	
2020	Chex Quest HD	NACL96	
2020	Final Fantasy VII Remake	Additional voices	
2021	Halo Infinite	Additional voices	
2022	Saints Row	Movie Star	
2022	Eolia	Salius Locrius	
2023	Journey to Foundation	Dex Rodo	
2024	Final Fantasy VII Rebirth	Additional voices	
2025	Avowed	Additional voices	
2025	Grounded 2	Additional voices	
2025	The Outer Worlds 2	Additional voices	
