= MadWorld =

2009 video game

- Developer: PlatinumGames
- Publishers: WW: Sega; JP: Spike
- Director: Shigenori Nishikawa
- Producer: Atsushi Inaba
- Designers: Tokuro Fujiwara; Eiro Shirahama; Hirono Sato; Takahisa Taura
- Programmer: Masumi Tarukado
- Artist: Yusuke Kan
- Writers: Yasumi Matsuno; Jean Pierre Kellams; Ken Pontac; Warren Graff
- Composer: Naoto Tanaka
- Platform: Wii
- Release: NA: March 10, 2009; EU: March 20, 2009; AU: March 26, 2009; JP: February 10, 2010
- Genres: Beat 'em up, hack and slash
- Modes: Single-player, multiplayer

MadWorld (Note: Japanese: マッドワールド, Hepburn: Maddo Wārudo) is a 2009 beat 'em up hack and slash video game developed by PlatinumGames and published by Sega for the Wii. It was the first game to be developed by PlatinumGames after its formation two years prior. Although a commercial failure, the game received generally positive reviews from critics. A spiritual successor, Anarchy Reigns, was released for the Xbox 360 and PlayStation 3 in 2012.

== Gameplay ==
Jack impales a foe on a "rose bush", a wall of spikes. The game's graphics were inspired by, and have been compared to, Frank Miller's Sin City.

MadWorld is divided into several levels representing different parts of Jefferson Island that have been converted into sets for the game show DeathWatch. The player progresses through these levels in a linear fashion during the first playthrough, but can revisit any completed level to attempt to score more points or take on a harder challenge.

Most levels are open environments, allowing the player to explore them freely, although some sections of the level may require the player to earn a number of points before it will be accessible. A few levels feature motorcycle-based combat where the main character, Jack, is assaulted by foes as they race down a track or in a small arena. The player is challenged to beat the level's boss within a time limit, but in order to activate the boss fight, the player must accumulate enough points by defeating regular foes on the level. There are other challenges, bonuses, or mini-bosses that become active after the player accumulates enough points. A common feature of each of these levels is the "Bloodbath Challenge", a time-limited minigame that rewards the player for completing a specific type of activity with additional points. For example, the player may need to attempt to swing a bat at foes to knock them into a giant dartboard to score points, or to ensure foes are trapped in front of a speeding train. Outside of these challenges, the player is awarded points for every defeat of a foe. The number of points for beating foes increases by increasing the foe's power or using more unusual methods of winning. For example, while the player could throw an enemy on a wall, the player will earn significantly more points if they had previously forced a tire around the enemy.

The player controls Jack from a third-person perspective using the Wii Remote and Nunchuk attachment for attacks and movement, respectively. MadWorld does not make use of the Wii Remote's infrared sensor, as its developers found it unnecessary to pinpoint movements on the screen in order to attack. When certain special attacks are possible, the player is prompted to press a button or move the controllers in a specific fashion to complete the action. In boss fights, the player must trigger special finishing moves that engage their foe in a series of quick time events in order to weaken, dismember attached weapons or defeat the boss, called Power Struggles. These are possible against certain normal enemies.

The game features extreme, over-the-top violence, but designer Shigenori Nishikawa intends it to be seen in a comical light despite the dark tone of the game. For example, in a minigame called "Man Darts", players must hit enemies onto a giant dart board with a baseball bat to score points. Because of the intended level of violence, PlatinumGames was unsure of whether or not the game would ultimately be released in Japan, stating, "In certain markets, there are a lot of limitations on the amount of violence you can show, so we definitely have the Western market much more in mind."

MadWorld features highly stylized graphics that use a limited color palette of high contrast black and white with red, partially inspired by Frank Miller's Sin City graphic novels.

== Plot ==
Three days before the game's event, the fictional Varrigan City became a target for a group of terrorists called "The Organizers", who severed the island city's transportation and communication ties with the rest of the world. They released a virus onto its population that would kill them in less than a day. However, the Organizers informed the populace that any person that killed another would receive the vaccine.

The city was quickly transformed into the stage of a recurring game show called DeathWatch, with announcers Howard "Buckshot" Holmes (Greg Proops) and former DeathWatch fighter Kreese Kreeley (John DiMaggio). The remaining citizens of Varrigan City and new hopeful ones become the show's contestants, hoping to become the top-ranked fighter in the game and win a large cash prize.

Jack Cayman (Steve Blum), a man with a chainsaw attached to his prosthetic arm, enters the games and manages to gain sponsorship from "Agent XIII" (Jim Ward). The game's organizers, led by Noa (Dwight Schultz), know Jack's motive is more than just to win, and learn that Jack works with someone on the outside. They come to learn that Jack was a former marine, police officer, and rogue agent, but now seems intent on a mission. Noa surmises that Jack is after Naomi Ann Boris (Kate Higgins), the mayor's daughter working in the city. While they plan to kill Jack, they realize he became an audience favorite, with many sponsors and viewers betting on his success.

Meanwhile, Jack meets Leo Fallmont (Danny Cooksey), a hospital doctor who was unwittingly trapped in the city but managed to obtain the vaccine. After telling Leo to stay low, Jack continues the mission. When Jack finds Naomi, he learns that she is the one watching the games and not getting in crisis. Jack leaves and continues to solve the case about the city's abnormal situation.

Meanwhile, the Organizers realize Jack as the reigning champ, who quit the games by signing on to the Chasers. As Jack nears the last battle against the reigning-feigning champ, the Black Baron (Reno Wilson), Agent XIII reveals himself to be Lord Gesser, an influential figure in politics and knows that the DeathWatch games were created to cause the attack, but admits that this particular incarnation of the games is solely driven by someone's greed, and passes on the name of Springvale to Jack and the Agency, which quickly recognizes the name as a pharmaceutical company and that they were the silent hand that had built (in anticipation of DeathWatch) much of the sets for the games as soon as the Organizers had released the virus.

After defeating the Black Baron at the end of the games, Jack blames Noa, who is shot and killed by Leo. After dealing with the armed forces, Jack disables the communication link with the Chasers and interrogates Leo. Leo tells Jack that his father was the president of Springvale Pharmaceuticals, who created both the virus and the vaccine, and was planning to use the televised DeathWatch event to show the effect of the virus as to blackmail anyone to pay for the vaccine under the outbreak. Leo admits that the company went bankrupt in the last presidential election and saw this route as the easiest way to recoup their losses. He is also at the games to be close to the action, fascinated by sports. Jack throws Leo off the tower to his death.

While the announcers complain about the irrelevance, Jack leaves Varrigan City.

== Development ==
MadWorld was created by PlatinumGames, a studio founded by former members of Capcom's Clover Studio, in their attempt to make a game that would be "fun and attractive" for the Wii, but that would also have a high level of violence that would make it unique for the system. The game was produced by Atsushi Inaba, who had previously produced Viewtiful Joe, and directed by Shigenori Nishikawa, one of the designers of Resident Evil 4. The developers chose violence as the main theme of the title, but experimented with a variety of cartoon-like art styles to alleviate the violent content with a sense of humor, ultimately deciding upon a black-and-white aesthetic with splashes of red for blood. Inaba and Nishikawa acknowledged the influence of Frank Miller's Sin City in the work, but also noted they borrowed from both Western and Japanese comic book styles to create a unique style. Comic-book style text and sound effects are also used in the game. The main character, Jack, was designed to be "big and tough" rather than traditionally heroic, with an appearance that suggests he "has been worn down by the world."

MadWorld was developed primarily for a Western audience, and the team extensively analyzed American pop culture in search of material that was so extreme and unrealistic it produced a comedic effect. Inaba played a variety of games, such as Manhunt 2, to see how they portrayed serious violence and to avoid making those same choices with MadWorld. Nishikawa chose to focus entirely on combat, omitting extraneous puzzle-solving or collection elements, with the goal of making the game easy to play in short sessions. The game's motion controls were designed to be as intuitive as possible, with Inaba reflecting that "we've come to believe the Wii controller is actually more intuitive and more relevant for action games." An emphasis was placed on earning high scores, while "Bloodbath Challenge" minigames were used to incorporate additional variety into the game's design.

The game was developed using Softimage for creation of the game's art, and a custom engine built to handle the art aesthetic and limitations of the Wii's memory. The game's sets are completely modeled with complex lighting features, but only normal maps are used to draw the game, avoiding the high-processing costs of light maps or layered textures. This allowed the game's artists to have finer control of visibility and color balance in the game. Though the developers attempted to add reflection mapping into the game, they found it did not fit well with the comic-book style and dropped it. Explosions and other effects, normally created in other games using particle effects to achieve a factor of realism, were modeled with particles in MadWorld, but using specially designed images to retain the comic book style.

To overcome the lighting issues, the main character of Jack was modeled with two different textures, one used when he was in a bright area, and second used in dark areas that highlighted the main lines of the character's face. Jack and other principal characters from the game were redesigned with the black-and-white features adjusted numerous times to make sure they did not simply blend into the background as the lesser enemies in the game. Other characters were drawn and modeled to be as destructible as possible, with numerous versions of each character having missing limbs or other bodily harm. These were put together in 2000-frame animations that were then motion-captured; movement from one animation to another was blended out with the use of Hermite interpolation. Blood spurts from each of the methods that Jack could use to kill a foe were each uniquely modeled to capture the appropriate trajectory for the type of injury, and often increasing the realistic amount of blood in order to make it stand out in the world. The spatters of blood on the walls, floor, and other characters was modeled within the game using a collision detection system and a complex system for how the blood would interact with Jack's clothing. Early builds of the game resulted in disorientation and eye strain due to the lack of colors. To avoid this, the developers limited the amount of on-screen movement and adjusted the game's textures to include more gradual changes from black to white. While some of MadWorld relies on the Havok engine for modeling physical interactions in the game, the developers found they had to resort to their own programs to capture some of the reactions and behaviors of the enemies for many of the unique killing methods.

Comparisons have been drawn between the game and Inaba's last project, God Hand, a comedy beat 'em up for the PlayStation 2. However, Inaba claims that while God Hand was developed for "hardcore" gamers, MadWorld is "a lot easier to pick up." The game's use of over-the-top violence was intentional to add humor to it.

The game's story was written by Yasumi Matsuno, famous for his design in the Ogre Battle series and a number of Square Enix titles. Matsuno was given two opposing guidelines to writing the scenario. While the development team ruled that violence should acceptable in the game's world, Inaba expressed his desire for violence to be "denied in the end" due to current views of violence in the video game industry. Matsuno combined the ideas for MadWorld's DeathWatch gameshow environment: violence is both accepted and required within the show, but not outside of it.

Proops and DiMaggio, who had previously worked together on animated films such as Asterix and the Vikings and Kaena: The Prophecy, were both contacted by the voice cast director Jack Fletcher to play the parts of the announcers for the North American and European release. While most of their lines were already scripted, the two were able to ad-lib during recording, with some lines being retained in the final game.

=== Soundtrack ===
The music for the game was composed by Naoto Tanaka, PlatinumGames' in-house composer, along with four different local artists—Ox, Doujah Raze, Sick YG, and Bandy Leggz. Tanaka wanted to "write in American style music and tried to avoid a true Japanese style". At the request of Inaba, the music styles included hip hop and rock, taking inspirations from the mashup album Collision Course from Linkin Park and Jay-Z. Tanaka created the backtracks first using Cubase SX and ACID, then gave these, along with the general theme of the level associated with the music, to the artists for them to add lyrics and other performances. Tanaka received feedback from the American branch of PlatinumGames to refine the music to get the Western style down. Music was then assigned for the various stages and boss battles, requiring some revision of the existing works to make the music more apt for that stage of the game. A total of 50 minutes of music was created for the game, and a soundtrack of the game's music was released along with the game in the United Kingdom and Australia. The soundtrack was released in North America on June 30, 2009, by Sumthing Distribution.

| No. | Title | Artist | Length |
|---|---|---|---|
| 1. | "Get It Up" | Ox | 2:47 |
| 2. | "Come With It" | Doujah Raze | 2:35 |
| 3. | "Survival" | S.O.U.L. Purpose | 2:30 |
| 4. | "Body That" | Ox | 2:36 |
| 5. | "Mad World" | Optimus | 2:24 |
| 6. | "Ain't That Funny" | Sick YG | 2:17 |
| 7. | "Lets Go!" | Ox | 2:39 |
| 8. | "Death & Honor" | Wordsmith | 2:30 |
| 9. | "Crazy" | Doujah Raze | 2:34 |
| 10. | "Deathwatch" | Doujah Raze | 2:32 |
| 11. | "Crimson Rain" | Ox | 2:44 |
| 12. | "You Don't Know Me" | Bandy Leggz | 2:22 |
| 13. | "Move" | Ox | 2:40 |
| 14. | "It's A Mad World" | Sick YG | 2:29 |
| 15. | "Bang" | Ox | 2:26 |
| 16. | "Ride!!" | Ox | 2:49 |
| 17. | "Breathe" | Ox | 2:33 |
| 18. | "Look Pimpin!" | Sick YG | 2:38 |
| 19. | "So Cold" | Ox | 2:32 |
| 20. | "Soul" | Ox | 3:49 |
| Total length: | | | 52:26 |

== Controversy ==
On August 19, 2008, Sega announced that MadWorld would not be released in Germany. Despite the fact that Australia is also known for strict video game classification, the game was released there unedited, with an MA15+ rating for "strong bloody violence and strong coarse language".

In a preview, Eurogamer commented: "It's difficult to understand why there's so much controversy surrounding MadWorld when the violence is so very Tom and Jerry... It really is hard to be offended... because it's just so ridiculous."

On March 10, the National Institute on Media and the Family issued a press release expressing its disappointment in Nintendo for allowing MadWorld to be released on the Wii.

== Reception ==
Reception

Aggregate scores
| Aggregator | Score |
|---|---|
| GameRankings | 83.07% |
| Metacritic | 81/100 |

Review scores
| Publication | Score |
|---|---|
| 1Up.com | A− |
| Computer and Video Games | 8/10 |
| Edge | 6/10 |
| Eurogamer | 7/10 |
| Famitsu | 31/40 |
| Game Informer | 9/10 |
| GamePro | 4.5/5 |
| GameSpot | 7.5/10 |
| GameSpy | 4/5 |
| GamesRadar+ | 4/5 |
| GameTrailers | 8.5/10 |
| Hyper | 9/10 |
| IGN | 9/10 |
| Nintendo Life | 9/10 |
| Nintendo Power | 9/10 |
| Nintendo World Report | 9/10 |
| Official Nintendo Magazine | 85% |
| X-Play | 4/5 |

MadWorld received "generally favorable" reviews from critics, according to the review aggregation website Metacritic. In its April 2009 issue, Nintendo Power gave MadWorld a 9/10 rating. IGN gave the game a 9/10, praising the style, gameplay, and music, but criticizing the camera and short length, though it mentions that the hard difficulty level lengthens the game and increases the challenge considerably.

About.com felt the game was more flash than substance, giving it a 3/5 and stating: "Divorced of its unique graphics and over-the-top presentation, this is actually a rather mediocre beat-em-up." Game Informer disagreed, praising the deep combat system and arguing: "for an amateur to become a talented executioner, you'll have to lash out creatively, prolonging your victim's death through multiple phases of pain. MadWorld runs the gamut in violence, taking an encyclopedic approach to its variety in kills. Some of the bloodletting will make you squirm uncomfortably." IGN opined: "MadWorld does not place emphasis on style over gameplay...there's plenty of fun, smart mechanics to back up the overwhelmingly slick look and sound of the title." 1Up.com praised the motion controls stating, "The immersive combat (aided by shockingly-fun Wii Remote and Nunchuk controls) would not have been as enjoyable if played on a traditional gamepad."

=== Sales ===
Sean Ratcliffe, Vice President of Marketing for Sega of America stated that, in terms of sales, "the first set of data for Madworld is very encouraging". The game sold around 66,000 copies in its first month of release in North America, according to The NPD Group. These sales numbers have been used by market research firm OTX Research to justify their assertion that hype and marketing do not translate into sales figures; MadWorld, while commanding the "highest level of unique interest" based on user input at IGN, ranks 41st in OTX's sales metric for all Wii titles. Sales of the game have reached 123,000 units in North America as of August 2009. MadWorld fared much poorer in Japan, where it debuted at number 33 on Japanese sales charts and only selling around 3,000 units during its release week.

== Legacy ==
Despite low sales for both MadWorld and The House of the Dead: Overkill, Sega stated that it would continue to explore mature games for the Wii, according to Gary Dunn, a director at Sega Europe, noting that such games have a long tail in sales as such games become more discounted. On January 4, 2010, it was announced that Sega would not publish any future M-rated video games for the Wii. However, PlatinumGames announced a few days later that they would like to do a sequel to MadWorld, which ended up as Anarchy Reigns, a 3D fighting game for PlayStation 3 and Xbox 360 that was released in 2012 in Japan and 2013 in western territories.

In a 2019 interview, Inaba called MadWorld one of the most enjoyable projects he had worked on. On March 10, 2020, PlatinumGames celebrated MadWorld's eleventh anniversary with new artwork of Jack created by lead character designer Masaki Yamanaka.
