= Viewtiful Joe =

- Genre: Beat 'em up
- Developers: Capcom Production Studio 4; Clover Studio
- Publisher: Capcom
- Creator: Hideki Kamiya
- Platforms: GameCube; PlayStation 2; PlayStation Portable; Nintendo DS
- First release: Viewtiful Joe; June 26, 2003
- Latest release: Viewtiful Joe: Double Trouble! November 2, 2005

Viewtiful Joe (Japanese: ビューティフル ジョー, Hepburn: Byūtifuru Jō) is a side-scrolling beat 'em up video game franchise created by Japanese game designer Hideki Kamiya. It follows avid movie-goer Joe, who is pulled into the world of the movies to become the superhero "Viewtiful Joe". The series is published by Capcom and was primarily developed by its subsidiary Clover Studio. The series has been largely dormant since the 2005 game Viewtiful Joe: Double Trouble!, however its characters have made appearances in later Capcom fighting games.

== Games ==
Release timeline
2003	Viewtiful Joe
2004	Viewtiful Joe 2
2005	Viewtiful Joe: Red Hot Rumble
2005	Viewtiful Joe: Double Trouble!

=== Viewtiful Joe (2003) ===
The first game in the series was directed by Hideki Kamiya, who had previously directed Resident Evil 2 and Devil May Cry. It was the second title to be released under the Capcom Five, developed by a team of developers within Capcom Production Studio 4 known as Team Viewtiful. The game was released for the GameCube on June 26, 2003, in Japan, and in October 2003 in North America and Europe. The gameplay features traditional 2D platform side-scrolling intermixed with 3D cel-shaded graphics. A PlayStation 2 version was developed in 2004 by Clover Studio featuring Dante from the Devil May Cry series as a playable character.

=== Viewtiful Joe 2 (2004) ===
The second game in the series was directed by Masaaki Yamada, with Hideki Kamiya writing the story. The game was released for both the GameCube and PlayStation 2 in 2004 in North America and Japan, and in 2005 in Europe and Australia. The game would be the first title to be fully developed by Clover Studio, a new studio within Capcom that was founded in 2004. Viewtiful Joe 2 features both Viewtiful Joe and Sexy Silvia as playable characters with similar gameplay elements to the first game.

== Development and history ==
Hideki Kamiya has expressed wanting to return to the series since leaving Capcom. In an interview with Dengeki PlayStation in 2017, he addressed his former employer that he would want to work on a remake of the first Viewtiful Joe. During PAX East 2020, Kamiya told attendees to "email Capcom" to get sequels to dormant franchises, including Viewtiful Joe. He later said he would like to finish the series with a third entry, as well as seeing a Nintendo Switch version of the first game.

== Other media ==
An anime TV series based on the video game series, simply titled Viewtiful Joe, was produced by Group TAC and aired from 2004 to 2005. A manga series was published concurrently in V Jump magazine.

Viewtiful Joe appears as a playable character in the Wii version of the 2008 fighting game Tatsunoko vs. Capcom. He also appears as a playable character in the 2011 fighting games Marvel vs. Capcom 3: Fate of Two Worlds and Ultimate Marvel vs. Capcom 3, and the 2013 mobile game Combo Crew.

== Reception ==
Aggregate review scores As of April 15, 2020.
Game	Year	Metacritic
Viewtiful Joe	2003	93/100 (NGC); 90/100 (PS2)
Viewtiful Joe 2	2004	86/100 (NGC); 85/100 (PS2)
Viewtiful Joe: Red Hot Rumble	2005	62/100 (NGC); 63/100 (PSP)
Viewtiful Joe: Double Trouble!	2005	73/100 (DS)

The first two Viewtiful Joe games received critical acclaim. However, the games that came after received a mixed response and did not sell well.

=== Sales ===
In Japan, the GameCube version of Viewtiful Joe sold through its initial shipment of less than 100,000 copies during the week of its release. Preorders of the GameCube version sold out on Capcom's North American website prior to its ship date, and Viewtiful Joe debuted as the tenth best-selling game in the region. The PlayStation 2 version sold a poor 9,912 units in its first week of release in Japan. Worldwide, sales of the game reached 275,000 copies on the GameCube and 46,000 on the PlayStation 2. Sales of the game in both North America and Europe were lower than what Capcom had predicted, but due to its small budget, the game was considered by Inaba to be relatively successful commercially.
