= Viewtiful Joe (video game) =

2003 video game

- North American cover art
- Developer: Capcom Production Studio 4 (Note: Ported to PlayStation 2 by Clover Studio)
- Publisher: Capcom
- Director: Hideki Kamiya
- Producer: Atsushi Inaba
- Programmer: Noriyuki Ōtani
- Artist: Kumiko Suekane
- Composers: Masakazu Sugimori; Masami Ueda
- Series: Viewtiful Joe
- Platforms: GameCube, PlayStation 2
- Release: GameCube: JP: June 26, 2003; NA: October 7, 2003; EU: October 24, 2003; AU: October 2003; PlayStation 2: NA: August 24, 2004; JP: September 9, 2004; EU: October 22, 2004
- Genres: Beat 'em up, platform
- Mode: Single-player

Viewtiful Joe (Note: Japanese: ビューティフル ジョー, Hepburn: Byūtifuru Jō) is a 2003 beat 'em up platform video game developed by Team Viewtiful and published by Capcom for the GameCube. It was originally released as a part of the Capcom Five, under director Hideki Kamiya and producer Atsushi Inaba. It was ported to the PlayStation 2 by the same design team under the name Clover Studio, subtitled in Japan Aratanaru Kibō (Japanese: 新たなる希望; lit. "A New Hope"). The story concerns Joe, an avid movie-goer whose girlfriend Silvia is kidnapped during a film starring Joe's favorite superhero, Captain Blue. Joe is shortly thereafter thrust into Movieland, where Silvia is taken by the villainous group known as Jadow. After accepting a special V-Watch from Captain Blue, Joe transforms into the tokusatsu-style persona Viewtiful Joe and sets out to rescue her.

The gameplay features traditional 2D platform side-scrolling intermixed with 3D cel-shaded graphics. Abilities known as "VFX Powers" grant the player special actions for combat and puzzle-solving, such as slowing down or speeding up time. Viewtiful Joe was critically acclaimed for its unique visual style and gameplay, earning itself a number of awards from various media publications, and has been listed as one of the greatest video games ever made. A minor commercial success, the game spawned several sequels, with releases seen on other consoles such as the PlayStation Portable (PSP) and Nintendo DS. An anime adaption and a manga series were also produced.

== Gameplay ==
Viewtiful Joe's core gameplay is similar to a traditional side-scrolling beat 'em up. Taking control of Joe, the player is mostly limited to moving left, right, up, and down on a fixed 2D path. The game contains platforming elements, such as the ability to jump and double jump. Combat consists of fighting multiple enemies on screen at once, with the enemies appearing from all directions, including the foreground and background. Joe has the ability to punch, kick, and dodge—which he can do by leaping upward or ducking. Dodging enemies' attacks successfully temporarily dazes them, leaving them wide open for attack. The player has certain number of hit points in the form of "Life Marks" located above the VFX Gauge, which decrease whenever Joe takes damage. Health can be restored by picking up hamburgers.

The Mach Speed VFX Power allows Viewtiful Joe to attack multiple enemies on screen at once.

Viewtiful Joe features unique gameplay elements in the form of Joe's "Viewtiful Effects (VFX) Power", which is designed to emulate camera tricks seen in films. VFX Power is used in both battling enemies, and solving various puzzles. These three powers are limited by the "VFX Gauge" located at the top of the screen. Normally, the meter is full, giving the player access to Joe's super powers via his Viewtiful Joe transformation. The meter slowly empties when an ability is in use. Once it depletes, Viewtiful Joe changes to normal Joe, lowering his attack and defense and leaving him temporarily devoid of VFX Power. The VFX Gauge automatically refills over time, and can also be manually filled by picking up bottles of "VFX Juice". The first VFX Power is "Slow", which slows time, causing the player's attacks to be more powerful, increasing Joe's reflexes, and allowing him to dodge attacks more easily. The second VFX Power, "Mach Speed", allows Joe to move at a faster speed, creating multiple after-images of him when he unleashes a flurry of attacks on all enemies on the screen. It can additionally cause his attacks to envelop Joe in a temporary heat shield, rendering him immune to flame attacks and setting enemies on fire when struck. The last VFX Power, "Zoom In", causes a camera close-up of Joe, powering up his normal attacks, granting him a set of new attacks, and paralyzing all lesser foes in proximity to him. However, any damage dealt to Joe whilst zoomed in is increased too. Any two VFX Powers can be combined. The VFX Gauge can be extended by collecting a certain number of V-Films present in each stage. The bar reverts to its normal length when a new stage begins.

Defeating enemies gives the player "V-Points" in the form of small and large coins, while using special attacks gives them "V-Marks", or "Viewtifuls", which can be converted into V-Points. Viewtifuls can be quickly gained by using combos or long chains of attacks. For example, while using Slow, striking a dazed enemy sets up all other enemies on the screen for a chain reaction, causing all points accrued during the duration of Slow to be multiplied by the number of enemies struck. If used deftly, the player will accumulate a large number of Viewtifuls due to the multiplier effect called "X-Bonus". Each stage in Viewtiful Joe consists of several interconnected missions, or scenes, that the player must complete in order to advance. When completing the stage, the player is graded on the number of V-Points earned, the amount of time taken, and how much damage Joe took. V-Points can be used between stages to purchase new abilities, expendable weapons (which include the "Voomerang" and "Shocking Pink Bombs"), more health, and health-restorative items. Clearing various difficulties allows players to play as different characters such as Silvia, Captain Blue and Alastor, with the PlayStation 2 version also allowing players to play as Devil May Cry's Dante.

== Plot ==
Viewtiful Joe is divided into seven stages, or "episodes", interspersed with storyline cutscenes, and bookended by an opening and ending cinematic. The setting is divided between Earth, and "Movieland", the fictional world of films. The plot begins in a movie theatre on Earth, in which the central character Joe and his girlfriend Silvia are watching a tokusatsu drama, starring the aged superhero Captain Blue. The movie's antagonist, having seemingly defeated Captain Blue, suddenly reaches out of the screen and abducts Silvia, taking her into Movieland. Joe is likewise picked up and taken into Movieland by Captain Blue's giant mecha, "Six Majin". Inside the movie, Joe must rescue Silvia from the evil Jadow, an organization of villains. To help him, Captain Blue entrusts him with a V-Watch, a device Joe can use to transform into a superhero upon saying the word "henshin (transform)." Joe promptly does so, inventing his own catchphrase: "Henshin-a-go-go, baby!"

With the guidance of Captain Blue, Joe fights his way through a number of Movieland's locations such as cities, caves, an underwater base, and a submarine, often travelling via his trusty, robot aircraft "Six Machine". One by one, Joe defeats the members of the Jadow, the bosses. These include Dark Fiend Charles the 3rd, Iron Ogre Hulk Davidson, Aquatic Terror Gran Bruce, a doppelgänger of Viewtiful Joe, and Blade Master Alastor. Before fighting Alastor, he reveals that in order for the Jadow to break out of Movieland and into the land of humans, they need the "DNA of the Creator", namely Silvia. Joe makes his way to her, trumping the Jadow's leader Inferno Lord Fire Leo in combat, only to witness Silvia being kidnapped once again afterwards. Joe and Six Machine race off into outer space after her in the final episode.

Finding Silvia atop the control room of a space station, Joe discovers that Captain Blue has been behind the plot the entire time. The former hero reveals that he is the creator of the film in which they currently exist, and that he is Silvia's seemingly-deceased father. Transforming into the colossal robot King Blue, the villain proclaims that he will take Sylvia's energy by force in order to break into the real world. Joe tells him off, telling him that he's no hero. Joe summons Six Majin, and the two engage in combat. When the fight ends, Captain Blue and Viewtiful Joe abandon their respective vehicles, and face off in a final battle within the space station.

Joe is victorious, and Captain Blue, finally coming to his senses, thanks the young hero for stopping him. He explains that two decades earlier, Blue was a revolutionary film maker who was soon thought of as a fad. Wanting nothing more than to create heroes, Blue was sucked into one of his own films, allowing him to live out his dream as a hero. However, he had lost touch with reality, and wanted revenge on the people who had betrayed him. As Captain Blue and Silvia embrace in a heartfelt reunion, the director tells Joe that the story is not complete. He snaps his fingers, and the space station's onboard computer warns of a large number of UFOs heading towards Earth. Blue tells Joe that a hero will be needed twice more to save the world. Joe attempts to leave, but not before Silvia requests a V-Watch from her father and to accompany her boyfriend. Viewtiful Joe and a newly transformed Silvia head out to stop the impending threat together.

== Development ==
Viewtiful Joe was developed by the design staff "Team Viewtiful", a part of Capcom Production Studio 4. It was announced in late 2002 as part of the Capcom Five, a line-up of five then-upcoming GameCube games to introduce new content to the console. It was directed by Capcom alumnus Hideki Kamiya, whose previous credits include the planning of Resident Evil and Resident Evil 2 and the direction of Devil May Cry. It was produced by Atsushi Inaba, who previously worked on the Ace Attorney series and Steel Battalion. In its earliest stages of development, Viewtiful Joe went under the working title "Red Hot Man", but the name was changed due to copyright conflicts with the American rock band Red Hot Chili Peppers. Viewtiful Joe's development team initially consisted of six people working under a twelve-month deadline. As work continued, the size of the team grew, and development ended up taking a full 21 months to complete. The game was conceived as a "staff-focused project" aimed at increasing the skill of its creators, specifically director Kamiya.

Inaba stated, "We wanted to create a challenging game with stunning visuals and fluid gameplay". As a lifelong fan of superheroes, Inaba's aim was to combine traditional Japanese tokusatsu with American comic books. The character designs created by Kumiko Suekane were inspired specifically by 1960s and 1970s Japanese-costumed tokusatsu television shows such as Kamen Rider and Ultraman. Graphically, the game adopted a 2D side-scrolling style mixed with 3D cel-shaded animation. Despite many games in the then-modern industry shying away from 2D graphical formats, Inaba said, "We have been able to breathe new life into the genre because we are using a new stylistic way that hasn't been seen before." The team chose the GameCube because of their target audience and because it lent itself well to Viewtiful Joe's gameplay.

The score for Viewtiful Joe was co-composed by Masakazu Sugimori and Masami Ueda. It was released alongside the score for Viewtiful Joe 2 on a double album titled Viewtiful Joe + Viewtiful Joe 2 Original Soundtrack in Japan on 22 December 2004 by Suleputer. A music video is played within the game featuring a rap vocal song titled "Viewtiful World" composed by D.A.I. The video features a group of people, including Inaba himself, motion captured as some of the characters. On 11 June 2003, Avex released the video on DVD and released the song as a single. Both the North American and Japanese releases of Viewtiful Joe feature English voice acting in order to keep a "western comic book feel". Voice-over work in Viewtiful Joe was provided by Soundelux Design Music Group. Voice actors include Dee Bradley Baker, Christina Puccelli, Gregg Berger, Mikey Kelley, Roger Rose, and Kevin Michael Richardson. Director Hideki Kamiya provides the voice for Six Machine.

A budget re-release for the GameCube titled Viewtiful Joe: Revival was released in Japan in late 2003, adding a "Sweet Mode" to decrease the difficulty setting from the original game's "Kids Mode". A PlayStation 2 port of Viewtiful Joe was released by Clover Studio in 2004. It was released in Japan with the subtitle A New Hope. The release added the character Dante of Devil May Cry as an unlockable character. The PlayStation 2 version does not feature progressive scan seen in the GameCube version. The game was also re-released under Nintendo's GameCube Player's Choice label in 2004 in North America and Europe. In a 2017 interview with Dengeki PlayStation, Kamiya expressed interest in remaking the game.

== Reception ==
Reception

Aggregate scores
Aggregator	Score
GameRankings	92% (74 reviews) (GCN); 88% (39 reviews) (PS2)
Metacritic	93/100 (52 reviews) (GCN); 90/100 (43 reviews) (PS2)

Review scores
Publication	Score
Electronic Gaming Monthly	8.7/10 (GCN); 8.7/10 (PS2)
Eurogamer	9/10 (GCN); 9/10 (PS2)
Famitsu	33/40 (GCN)
Game Informer	9.5/10 (GCN); 9.5/10 (PS2)
GamePro	5/5 (GCN); 4.5/5 (PS2)
GameSpot	9.2/10 (GCN); 8.8/10 (PS2)
GameSpy	5/5 (GCN); 5/5 (PS2)
IGN	9.5/10 (GCN); 9.1/10 (PS2)
Play	100% (GCN); 91% (PS2)

=== Reviews and sales ===
Viewtiful Joe received acclaim. Metacritic lists the GameCube and PlayStation 2 versions at 93 out of 100 and 90 out of 100, respectively. The graphics, gameplay, and challenge were all common areas of praise among many reviewers. IGN gave Viewtiful Joe an "Outstanding" rating, noting that the beautiful cel-shaded graphics and high-intensity action make it one of the best action games on the GameCube and PlayStation 2. Likewise, Eurogamer called it "imaginative, beautiful, engaging and above all else entertaining". Game Informer praised it as "a completely original and highly entertaining work of art". Criticisms about Viewtiful Joe have been few, but consistent among reviews. IGN complained of a lack of boss variety. GameSpy has concurred, noting that the bosses were too easy due to a powerful attack that the player can perform. Reviewers have also criticized the lack of progressive scan in the PlayStation 2 port. IGN and Eurogamer notied that the PlayStation 2 port suffers slowdown in later stages.

In Japan, the GameCube version sold through its initial shipment of less than 100,000 copies during the week of its release. Preorders of the GameCube version sold out on Capcom's North American website prior to its ship date, and Viewtiful Joe debuted as the tenth best-selling game in the region. The PlayStation 2 version sold a poor 9,912 units in its first week of release in Japan. Worldwide, sales reached 275,000 copies on the GameCube and 46,000 on the PlayStation 2. Sales in both North America and Europe were lower than what Capcom had predicted, but due to its small budget, the game was considered by Inaba to be relatively successful commercially.

=== Legacy ===
Viewtiful Joe garnered a number of awards and nominations from various magazines, popular gaming websites, and video game award programs. IGN named Viewtiful Joe "GameCube Game of the Year" and "Best Action Game of 2003". At GameSpot's Best of 2003, the game was nominated for "Best Artistic Achievement in a Game", "Coolest New Character", "Best GameCube Game", "Readers' Choice Best GameCube Action Game", and "Readers' Choice GameCube Game of the Year". It was also named the fourth-best GameCube game of 2003 by GameSpy, winning the website's "Most Stylish" award for the year. Viewtiful Joe won "Most Innovative Game Design" in Nintendo Power magazine's 2003 Player's Choice Awards. It won "GameCube Game of the Year" awards for 2003 from both USA Today and GMR. The game was nominated by the Academy of Interactive Arts & Sciences for "Console Platform Action/Adventure Game of the Year" in 2004 and was nominated for three British Academy of Film and Television Arts (BAFTA) Awards including "Best Design", "Best Intro/Animation", and "Best GameCube Game". The game won "Unsung Hero Game of the Year" at the 2003 Golden Joystick Awards and "Best New Franchise" at the 2004 G-Phoria awards. Finally, it was recognized at the 4th Annual Game Developers Choice Awards as one of three "Game Innovation Spotlights".

Viewtiful Joe has been included in a number of "best games" lists in the years following its release. It was rated the 27th best game made on a Nintendo system in Nintendo Power's "Top 200 Games" list in February 2006 and the 10th best game on the GameCube in its August 2008 issue reflecting on the top 20 games for each system. Both GameSpy and the G4 television program X-Play named Viewtiful Joe the ninth best game of all time for the GameCube. In 2007, Viewtiful Joe was named the 17th best GameCube game of all time in IGN's feature reflecting on the system's long lifespan. Later in 2007, ScrewAttack listed the game at seventh on their Top 10 GameCube Games of All Time.

Viewtiful Joe was successful enough to establish a franchise, and a few other related media titles were released. Viewtiful Joe was followed by a direct sequel titled Viewtiful Joe 2—released for both the GameCube and PlayStation 2—and two spinoffs: Viewtiful Joe: Red Hot Rumble for the PSP and GameCube and Viewtiful Joe: Double Trouble! for the Nintendo DS. An anime adaption of the game was produced by Group TAC, airing on the Japanese television station TV Tokyo beginning in 2004 and being licensed for US distribution by Geneon Entertainment in 2005. A set of Viewtiful Joe trading figures was released by Agatsuma Entertainment in October 2005, while a series of action figures made by Jazwares was released in July 2006. V Jump published a manga series of Viewtiful Joe from November 2004.

In 2004, Capcom registered the domain name ViewtifulJoe3.com, suggesting another sequel. Shortly thereafter, the website was devoid of content. In January 2006, Atsushi Inaba expressed interest in developing a title in the series for the Wii. However, as none of Clover Studio's games proved to be an outstanding financial success, Capcom officially dissolved the subsidiary in March 2007 after the release of its final two games, Ōkami and God Hand. Its key members left to form a new company called PlatinumGames. Capcom producer Jun Takeuchi commented at the 2009 San Diego Comic-Con that there have been currently no plans to continue with the series, although Viewtiful Joe has appeared as a playable character in Capcom's 2008 Wii fighting game Tatsunoko vs. Capcom and is a playable character in Marvel vs. Capcom 3: Fate of Two Worlds and Ultimate Marvel vs. Capcom 3 for the PlayStation 3 and Xbox 360.

However, in 2012, PlatinumGames announced the development of The Wonderful 101, then known as Project P-100. This was the first project that reunited Kamiya and Inaba as director and producer on a title since the development of the Viewtiful Joe series. Furthermore, The Wonderful 101 uses the same tokusatsu thematics of the Viewtiful Joe series, and the two share a similar art style albeit different gameplay. This has led fans to hail The Wonderful 101 as a spiritual successor of sorts. The franchise would also later be featured in Archie Comics' Worlds Unite crossover with several other Capcom and Sega series, taking place in the Sonic the Hedgehog and Mega Man comics.
