= Clover Studio =

Japanese video game developer

Clover Studio Co., Ltd.
- Native name: 株式会社クローバースタジオ
- Romanized name: Kabushiki Gaisha Kurōbā Sutajio
- Formerly: Studio 9
- Type: Subsidiary
- Industry: Video games
- Founded: 1 July 2004 (22 years ago)
- Defunct: March 2007 (19 years ago)
- Fate: Dissolved
- Successor: Clovers
- Headquarters: Osaka, Japan
- Key people: Atsushi Inaba (CEO); Kenzo Tsujimoto (vice-president); Yoshifumi Yamashita (director); Haruhiro Tsujimoto (senior manager); Tamio Oda (managing director); Shinji Utsunomiya (design lead); Dragan Tosic (lead composer); Ryuta Takahashi (software engineer)
- Products: God Hand; Ōkami; Viewtiful Joe
- Parent: Capcom
- Website: cloverstudio.co.jp

Clover Studio Co., Ltd. (Japanese: 株式会社クローバースタジオ, Hepburn: Kabushiki Gaisha Kurōbā Sutajio) was a Japanese video game developer founded by Capcom. The studio developed the PlayStation 2 port of Viewtiful Joe, both versions of Viewtiful Joe 2 for the GameCube and PlayStation 2, and the PS2 titles Ōkami and God Hand. The name "clover" is an abbreviation of "creativity lover" as well as the Japanese syllables mi ("three") and ba ("leaf") coming from the names of Shinji Mikami and Clover's Atsushi Inaba.

The studio consisted largely of existing Capcom R&D talent, who had formed the company (then called Studio 9) to give themselves greater executive control (and thus creative freedom), like Sega's semi-autonomous studios in the early 2000s. The studio focused largely on creating new intellectual property rather than sequels. When these failed to perform on par with Capcom's more popular series, Capcom attempted to merge the studio back into their internal R&D. Those at the studio chose instead to leave the company, and Clover was dissolved.

Some of the key members of Clover founded Seeds Inc., a new development group that merged with ODD Incorporated in October 2007 to form PlatinumGames, which has since built up a staff composed of former Clover staff. Other members (including the art director of Ōkami) went to join UTV Ignition Games at their Tokyo development studio, which developed the game El Shaddai: Ascension of the Metatron. On 28 October 2010, one of the most prominent members of Clover Studio and then PlatinumGames, Shinji Mikami, joined ZeniMax Media in a deal where ZeniMax acquired his new development studio Tango Gameworks.

It was announced during The Game Awards 2024 that Hideki Kamiya had founded a new independent studio named Clovers to develop a sequel to Ōkami, with its name being a reference to Clover Studio.

== History ==
To facilitate Viewtiful Joe 2's development, Capcom turned "Team Viewtiful" into Clover Studio, a semi-autonomous production company with a focus on developing new intellectual properties (IPs). The separation was also in part due to Resident Evil 4's PlayStation 2 release, which caused significant tensions between Capcom and Mikami, who had touted the game's console exclusivity. Clover Studio was able to produce two more games in the Viewtiful Joe series, which serve as side-stories, and commissioned an anime adaptation which was handled by Group TAC. Clover's next big project was Ōkami, a "brand-focused project" fitting with Capcom's goal for Clover to develop new IPs. Although it was a critical success, it failed to live up to Capcom's sales expectations; Clover's next project God Hand did even worse. Compounding this problem, Clover's developers still felt stifled under the weight of Capcom's corporate management, who were reluctant or actively opposed to risky new ideas.

Capcom shut down Clover Studio in late 2006, after Atsushi Inaba, Hideki Kamiya and Shinji Mikami left the company.

These resignations were part of a series of high-profile departures from Capcom, including Yoshiki Okamoto in 2003 and Keiji Inafune in 2010. Inafune complained of similar problems, as Inaba, Kamiya and Mikami, namely that Capcom management had a rule dictating that at least 70–80 percent of all new projects must be sequels of existing properties, with the actual number very close to 100 percent at any time.

== Legacy ==
They would go on to found PlatinumGames with members of their old studio. In 2008, they announced the "Platinum Three", referring to MadWorld, Infinite Space, and Bayonetta, which would attempt to carry on the Capcom Five's ambitious and creative original spirit.

In 2009, Capcom producer and Senior Corporate Officer of R&D Keiji Inafune told 1UP.com that the company had no interest at the time to produce sequels to Clover titles.

In 2010, Capcom released a sequel to Ōkami, titled Ōkamiden, for the Nintendo DS.

Characters from Viewtiful Joe and Ōkami have appeared in other Capcom media. Viewtiful Joe and Yami, antagonist of Ōkami, appear in the 2008 fighting game Tatsunoko vs. Capcom. Viewtiful Joe and Amaterasu, the protagonist of Ōkami, both appear as playable characters in the 2011 fighting game Marvel vs. Capcom 3: Fate of Two Worlds and Ultimate Marvel vs. Capcom 3.

A high-definition port of Ōkami, remastered by Capcom and HexaDrive, was released on the PlayStation 3 via the PlayStation Network in October 2012 and for retail in Japan in November 2012. The high-definition port was also released for Microsoft Windows, PlayStation 4 and Xbox One in December 2017 worldwide, with a Nintendo Switch version released in August 2018.

== Games developed ==
Year	Title	Platform(s)	Publisher
2003	Viewtiful Joe	GameCube, PlayStation 2	Capcom
2004	Viewtiful Joe 2	GameCube, PlayStation 2	Capcom
2005	Viewtiful Joe: Red Hot Rumble	GameCube, PlayStation Portable	Capcom
2005	Viewtiful Joe: Double Trouble!	Nintendo DS	Capcom
2006	Ōkami	PlayStation 2	Capcom
2006	God Hand	PlayStation 2	Capcom

== See also ==
- List of Capcom subsidiaries
