= XONE (magazine) =

Xbox 360 and One-dedicated magazine

- Issue 64 (October 2010) of X360. The cover art features Vanquish.
- Editor: Jon Gordon
- Categories: Xbox 360, Xbox One
- Frequency: Four weekly
- Circulation: 12,592 (Jan 13 to Dec 13)
- First issue: January 2005
- Final issue: November 2015
- Company: Imagine Publishing
- Country: United Kingdom
- Language: English
- Website: www.xb1.co.uk
- ISSN: 1471-1192

XONE (formerly X360) was a monthly magazine produced by Imagine Publishing in the United Kingdom. XONE was the UK's #1 selling independent dedicated Xbox 360 and Xbox One magazine, covering news, previews and reviews. The magazine's community and Xbox Live was also featured heavily in the magazine.

== History and profile ==
The magazine was originally included as a supplement in the now-defunct Highbury Entertainment publication XBM, but it became a monthly magazine in October 2005, prior to the launch of the Xbox 360. It was Highbury Entertainment's biggest-ever launch (known at the time as X-360), with over £200k spent on below-the-line marketing. The magazine is packaged with a DVD featuring game trailers narrated by the XONE team, along with a book usually containing a walkthrough or achievement guide. In October 2013, its original title, X360, was changed to XONE with issue 104.

The magazine ceased publication as of November 2015

== Format ==
=== Network ===
The magazine's introductory section covering recent news, developer insights, and monthly opinion columns.

=== Previews ===
The preview section contained information, screenshots and developer interviews about future titles. It also contains information similar to that present in the 'review' section.

=== Reviews ===
The latest games were reviewed here. A section at the beginning of each review gave information such as the game's publisher, genre, developer, release date and other details. XONE scores games on a 1-10 scale.

=== Community ===
Xbox Live and Arcade reviews, along with downloadable add-on ratings and the letters section.
