= Vanquish (video game) =

2010 video game

- Developer: PlatinumGames (Note: Additional work for Windows by Little Stone Software and by Armature Studio for PlayStation 4 and Xbox One)
- Publisher: Sega
- Director: Shinji Mikami
- Producers: Atsushi Inaba; Jun Yoshino; Atsushi Kurooka (PC)
- Designers: Masaaki Yamada; Shigenori Nishikawa; Junichi Oka; Hiroki Kato
- Programmers: Kiyohiko Sakata; Shuichiro Chiboshi
- Artists: Naoki Katakai; Yusuke Kan
- Writers: Hiroki Kato; Jean Pierre Kellams
- Composers: Erina Niwa; Masafumi Takada; Masakazu Sugimori
- Platforms: PlayStation 3, Xbox 360, Windows, PlayStation 4, Xbox One
- Release: October 19, 2010: PlayStation 3, Xbox 360; NA: October 19, 2010; JP/AU: October 21, 2010; EU: October 22, 2010 Windows; WW: May 25, 2017 PlayStation 4, Xbox One; WW: February 18, 2020; JP: May 28, 2020 (PS4)
- Genre: Third-person shooter
- Mode: Single-player

Vanquish (Note: Japanese: ヴァンキッシュ, Hepburn: Vankisshu) is a 2010 third-person shooter game developed by PlatinumGames and published by Sega for the PlayStation 3 and Xbox 360. It began development in 2007 and was released worldwide in October 2010. A Windows port was released on May 25, 2017. A compilation titled Bayonetta & Vanquish 10th Anniversary Bundle was released for PlayStation 4 and Xbox One on February 18, 2020, including remastered versions of the game and PlatinumGames' Bayonetta.

The game is notable for introducing several innovations to the 3D shooter genre, including a fast-paced style of gameplay reminiscent of 2D bullet hell shooters, beat 'em up elements, and an original sliding-boost mechanic. It received a positive critical reaction upon release, with critics praising the game's fast-paced action, innovations to the shooter genre, boss battles and visual style, while criticizing the game's writing, voice acting and overall short length of the campaign. The game is estimated to have sold over 1 million units worldwide.

== Gameplay ==
Players control Sam Gideon, a DARPA agent armed with the Augmented Reaction Suit. If the player takes too much damage, the suit will automatically enter Augmented Reaction (AR) mode. AR mode increases Sam's reflexes tenfold, essentially slowing down time for Sam to evade attacks. The player can also manually enter AR mode by holding down the aim button while evading, sliding, or vaulting over cover, allowing the player to target enemies (and their weak spots) easily. At any time, the player can use boosters on the suit to quickly slide across an area. If the player uses AR mode or the boosters too much in a short time, the suit will overheat and will require a short period to cool down, during which Sam is less mobile (and cannot use the boosters or AR mode). The suit will also overheat when the player uses a melee attack near the enemy among other certain areas.

=== Weaponry ===
Sam's arsenal consists of the BLADE weapons system and two types of grenades. The BLADE system can store up to three weapons at a time (from a total of eight standard weapon types, plus three added in a DLC pack). The player is able to swap weapons if they come across a type of weapon not already in their possession by simply holding down the reload button. This will replace the weapon in the active weapon slot.

These weapons, and the grenades, can be upgraded by collecting upgrade chips. Collecting a type of weapon already in the player's inventory will replenish its ammunition, while doing so with maximum ammunition constitutes one third of an upgrade. Upgrading a weapon improves its statistics, such as their maximum ammunition capacity, firepower, and blast radius. Players can aid injured allies on the field to earn weapons, or find them in crates or weapon lockers.

On Normal and Hard difficulty levels, the active weapon is downgraded by one level upon death, while the God Hard difficulty level prohibits upgrades altogether.

=== Others ===
Other gameplay mechanics include the use of explosives during certain areas, the ability to commandeer enemy walkers or turrets, the ability to use cigarettes to distract enemies, and quick-time events during certain battles against larger or stronger enemies.

It has also significantly improved upon the cover system, which it has been credited for taking "to the next level." In contrast to previous cover-based shooters, the game has bullets and missiles coming from all directions in a manner reminiscent of bullet hell shooters.

Some cover is easily destructible, forcing Sam to be on the move, while the game also penalizes the player's score for the amount of time spent in cover. Its most important innovation, however, is the aforementioned sliding-boost mechanic that allows the player to slide into and out of cover at high speeds (and in slow motion using AR mode), acting as a defensive escape and an offensive set up, opening up new gameplay possibilities for cover-based shooters and increasing the pace significantly.

The game features a unique end credits rail shooting sequence, depicting faces of staff members on asteroids.

== Plot ==
In the near future, Earth's human population burgeons to the point where nations fight for scarce resources. The United States of America attempts to alleviate energy problems by launching SC-01 Providence, an O'Neil Cylinder space colony using a solar energy microwave transmitter to provide them with an alternative source. However, the government of the Russian Federation of Eurasia has been overthrown in a coup d'état by a section of the military, calling themselves the Order of the Russian Star. They capture Providence and use the microwave transmitter to devastate San Francisco. Victor Zaitsev (Marc Worden / Yoshirō Matsumoto), a Russian Star agent, demands the American government to surrender or he will target New York City.

Elizabeth Winters (Lee Meriwether / Orine Fukushima), the President of the United States, sends Lieutenant Colonel Robert Burns (Steve Blum / Teruyuki Tanzawa) to infiltrate the station, along with the Bravo Company, an army of space Marines. They recruit Sam Gideon (Gideon Emery / Kenichirou Matsuda), a Defense Advanced Research Projects Agency (DARPA) soldier equipped with the prototype Augmented Reaction Suit (ARS), a cutting-edge battlesuit outfitted with a vast array of functions, including jet boosters attached to his thighs. He is armed with the experimental Battlefield Logic Adaptable Electronic Weapon System (BLADE), which scans existing weapons and transforms into them. It stores only three scans at a time and can shapeshift between each on command. He is assisted by Elena Ivanova (Kari Wahlgren / Chieko Honda) aboard the SBC2 command ship. The mission gives DARPA the perfect chance to test the suit. Winters gives classified orders for Sam to rescue scientist Dr. Francois Candide (Benito Martinez / Hitoshi Bifu), whom Zaitsev kidnapped. While Sam and Burns infiltrate Providence, Candide disables the microwave.

As Sam reaches the microwave station, Candide tells Sam that Burns and Winters have betrayed the United States, before being killed by Burns. Burns tells Sam that he will change the microwave's target to Moscow under Winters' orders, explaining the city's destruction as an "economic stimulus package." Sam defeats Burns, who orders him to escape. Burns uses a bomb in his bionic arm to kill himself and the remaining Bravo Company troops. Zaitsev tells Sam that Winters had secretly supported the Order of the Russian Star, but she betrayed them by using the coup as a pretext to declare war on Russia. He claims that she intends to use it to cement American hegemony worldwide and that the Order preemptively attacked the station as retribution. Sam defeats two slave units and learns that Zaitsev had controlled them. Zaitsev activates a tactical nuke inside the remaining suit to destroy Providence and prevent anyone from reclaiming it. Sam boards an escape pod, survives the explosion, and reunites with Elena on their ship. Zaitsev escapes as well, and is congratulated by his superiors for accomplishing the mission and being told to move on to the next phase of the plan. Winters commits suicide after being charged with treason and exposed by Sam.

== Development and release ==
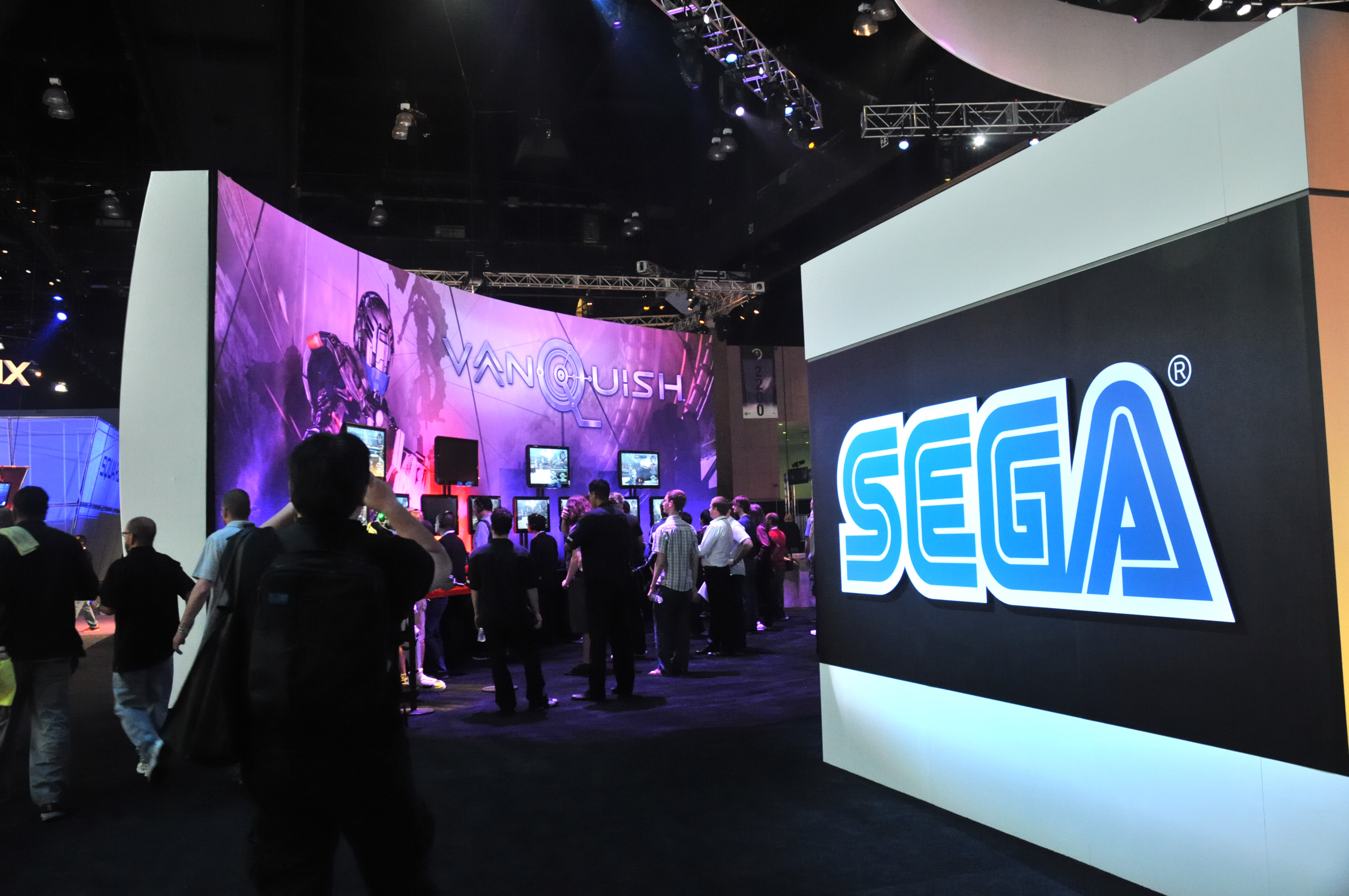
Vanquish at E3 2010

Shinji Mikami stated that the game's graphics were partially inspired by Casshern, a 1970s anime series by Tatsunoko Production. Mikami also stated that the game design itself was inspired by Casshern. Mikami originally wanted to create a game just like Casshern, but with the addition of guns, since Mikami had already previously created a brawler with God Hand. However, while making Vanquish a shooter, Mikami still wanted to maintain Casshern's "feeling of speed", which is the reason he introduced the sliding-boost mechanic. Vanquish uses the Havok physics engine.

The game's development began in 2007. In January 2010, a pre-rendered video trailer was released. Atsushi Inaba produced the game. Mikami has stated that the game is being developed with the PlayStation 3 as its lead platform in an effort to "help avoid dodgy PS3 ports", commenting that it was a "great success." Where the main development platform for PlatinumGames' other title Bayonetta was the Xbox 360, the PS3 port was handled by Nex Entertainment. The port was criticized for inferior performance to the Xbox 360 likely due to PS3's relatively challenging architecture, therefore prompting the team to use the PS3 as the lead platform for Vanquish. It is Mikami's only game under the PlatinumGames brand.

If pre-ordered from GameStop in North America, the game came with the exclusive "Tri-Weapon" DLC pack that later became available for sale on Xbox Live and PlayStation Network in November 2012. The three weapons in the pack are included in later ports.

Several European retailers offered free copies of Bayonetta with pre-orders of Vanquish. Zavvi in the UK offered a Limited Edition release which included a statuette of lead protagonist Sam Gideon as a pre-order bonus.

To celebrate the game's tenth anniversary, Sega announced a Bayonetta & Vanquish 10th Anniversary Bundle compilation for the PlayStation 4 and Xbox One. The retail release includes a steelbook and Vanquish, alongside fellow PlatinumGames title Bayonetta, on a single disc, with support for 4K 60fps visuals for PlayStation 4 Pro and Xbox One X users. Both games can also be purchased digitally either individually or collectively at a discount price. The 10th Anniversary Bundle was released on February 18, 2020.

== Reception ==
=== Critical reception ===
Reception

Aggregate score
Aggregator	Score	
Aggregator	PS3	Xbox 360
Metacritic	84/100	84/100

Review scores
Publication	Score	
Publication	PS3	Xbox 360
Destructoid	N/A	5/10
Edge	8/10	N/A
Eurogamer	N/A	9/10
Game Informer	N/A	7.75/10
GamePro	N/A	3.5/5
GameRevolution	B+	B+
GameSpot	9/10	9/10
GameTrailers	N/A	9/10
GameZone	7/10	7/10
Giant Bomb	4/5	4/5
IGN	8.5/10	8.5/10
Joystiq	N/A	4.5/5
Official Xbox Magazine (US)	N/A	9/10
PlayStation: The Official Magazine	8/10	N/A
The Daily Telegraph	N/A	9/10
The Escapist	4/5	N/A

Awards
Publication	Award
CGR, Zavvi.com	Game of the Year
X360	Best Shooter
IGN	Best Sci-Fi Game (PS3)
GameSpot	Best Game No One Played
GameSpot	Best Original Game Mechanic
GamesRadar	Most "Oh Shit" Moments Per Minute

The game received "favorable" reviews according to video game review aggregator Metacritic. Many reviewers praised the game's visuals, gameplay, innovation, fast pace, and over-the-top style, though some also criticized its short length, lack of multiplayer, mediocre plot, and corny dialogue. GameTrailers noted that it is hard to imagine the slow-motion gameplay working in multiplayer. Game Informer stated, "Don't be surprised if you finish your first playthrough in four hours or less." This view was challenged by PlatinumGames' writer Jean Pierre Kellams as well as Eurogamer.

Famitsu gave the game a score of two nines, one ten and one nine, for a total of 37 out of 40. Elsewhere, The Daily Telegraph gave the Xbox 360 version a score of nine out of ten and called it "a fast-paced, high-octane and resolutely hard-core shooter, which makes no concessions to casual gamers. It also happens to be one of the best games of 2010." The A.V. Club gave the same console version a B+, calling it "flat-out ridiculous, designed strictly to amuse, not to offer any greater message." The Escapist gave the PlayStation 3 version a score of four stars out of five, saying, "All of the trappings are perfectly sound if not extraordinary, and despite one or two incredibly vexing design decisions, Vanquish's combat is blisteringly fast and a genuine pleasure to watch and play when it's going well - but an exercise in maddening frustration when it isn't." The Guardian also gave the same console version four stars out of five, saying that it "isn't going to change the face of gaming, but it's impressive to behold, satisfying to play (as long as you're reasonably hardcore) and shot through with humour (look out, for example, for the robots dancing to a ghetto-blaster which transforms into a mobile gun). It's the best thing Shinji Mikami has done for quite a while." Eurogamer said it was "a game of astounding creativity and polish" and "the best third-person shooter ever to come out of Japan." Their only minor criticism was the title's replay value, "perhaps the only area of the game which lags behind its Western counterparts."

=== Sales ===
The PlayStation 3 and Xbox 360 versions of the game respectively debuted at number four (48,318 units) and number 14 (11,204 units) on Japanese sales charts during their release week. By February 2011, the game had sold 820,000 copies worldwide. By March 2011, the game had sold 830,000 copies worldwide on the PlayStation 3 and Xbox 360 platforms.

By July 2018, the PC version had approximately 143,289 players. Steam Spy estimates the Steam version sold over 200,000 copies by December 2018 and more than 500,000 units as of 2024, adding up to more than 1.33 million units sold across all platforms.

=== Awards ===
The game received Game of the Year awards from the Classic Game Room, and Zavvi.com. X360 gave it the "Best Shooter" award, and GamesRadar gave it an award for Most "Oh Shit" Moments Per Minute. IGN gave it the "Best Sci-Fi Game" award in the PS3 category, and nominated the game for the awards of "Coolest Atmosphere", "Most Challenging", "Most Addictive Game", "Best Visuals" and "Best Blockbuster Game". GameSpot gave the game the awards for "Best Game No One Played", both the editors' award and the Readers' Choice award, and "Best Original Game Mechanic" for its rocket-sliding game mechanic, which acts as both a defensive escape and an offensive setup, opening up new gameplay possibilities for action games. GameSpot also nominated the game for the awards of "Best Shooter", "Best Sound Design", "Best Original IP", "Best Xbox 360 Game", "Best PS3 Game" and overall "Game of the Year".
