= God Hand =

2006 video game

- North American box art
- Developer: Clover Studio
- Publisher: Capcom
- Director: Shinji Mikami
- Producer: Atsushi Inaba
- Designer: Hiroki Kato
- Programmer: Kiyohiko Sakata
- Artist: Masaki Yamanaka
- Writer: Hiroki Kato
- Composers: Masafumi Takada; Jun Fukuda
- Platform: PlayStation 2
- Release: JP: September 14, 2006; NA: October 10, 2006; EU: February 16, 2007; AU: February 21, 2007
- Genre: Beat 'em up
- Mode: Single-player

God Hand (Note: Japanese: ゴッドハンド, Hepburn: Goddo Hando) is a 2006 beat 'em up game developed by Clover Studio and published by Capcom for the PlayStation 2. It was released in Japan and North America in 2006, and in 2007 for PAL territories. It was re-released for the PlayStation 3 as a PS2 Classics downloadable game on the PlayStation Network on October 4, 2011. The game was directed by Shinji Mikami, who desired to create the game for hardcore gamers intermixed with a large amount of comic relief. It initially received a mixed response from critics and sold only modestly upon its release in Japan. It was Clover Studio's final video game. Retrospectively, the game has been received more positively and is considered a cult classic.

The game mixes western and Japanese-themed comedy, containing over-the-top characters and storyline events. The gameplay includes traditional elements of the beat 'em up genre with new features, these include being able to map and string together a large repertoire of fighting techniques to the gamepad's face buttons in order to create unique combo attacks. The plot follows a martial artist protecting his companion and wielding a legendary divine arm called the "God Hand", in order to save the world from demons.

== Gameplay ==
The 3D action game has the player moving in all directions, attacking with the face buttons and using special moves. The player can turn around using a button, and all actions outside of basic attacks are performed via a context sensitive button. Using the button allows the player, as Gene, to jump up ladders, pick up items, and use special attacks on abnormal enemies. Four dodge moves are mapped to the directions on the right analog stick. The player can assign any attacks, including the Circle, Triangle, Square, and X buttons. Square allows the player to chain multiple attacks at once. There are over one hundred moves in the game for the player to choose from including basic jabs and punches to drunken-style and capoeira martial arts.

The game shows Gene fighting the enemy with kicking attacks

More powerful abilities in the game can be utilized in the player's "God Reel" (or "God Roulette"), a roulette wheel containing moves that the player chooses. These moves are limited to a number of "Roulette Orbs" that the player can increase by collecting "Skull Cards" found throughout each stage. God Reel techniques cost between one and three Roulette Orbs. Some moves send each opponents flying into the stratosphere, while others are simple punches or kicks to specific bodyparts. Another gameplay mechanic in the player's arsenal is the God Hand itself. As the player strikes and defeats enemies, his "Tension Gauge" goes up. The player can also evade attacks, taunt, use tension boosting attacks, or find cards within each stages to increase the bar. When it reaches a set amount, the player can remove Gene's bracelet from his arm and temporarily unleash the God Hand. In this state, he is temporarily invincible with his attack power and speed increasing. By using various stat boosting items, the player can increase the size of his Tension Gauge to hold more power.

While in combat, the player can monitor a "Difficulty Level" bar that dynamically adjusts to how much damage the player is dealing or receiving. If the player gets caught up in a flurry of punches and combos, the level will drop; the player can also use the Grovel God Roulette to manually decrease the level by one. If the player deals a large number of unanswered attacks to their enemies while also dodging their attacks, then the level will increase. The bar consists of numerical levels one through three with a fourth level designated "Die" being the highest overall. During levels one and two, the enemies will not attack the player unless they are in his line of sight or he is attacking them. On levels three and Die, the enemies will attack regardless of the camera position. Also, enemy attack strength increases as the levels increase; at level Die a fully maxed out player character can be killed in a few hits. Defeating enemies at higher Difficulty Levels earns the player more bonus points at the end of a stage. By finishing the game once, the player unlocks the Hard Mode when starting a new game, which sets the difficulty bar at "Die" from the start, and it cannot be lowered in any way.

Enemies will mostly engage Gene one-on-one, but as the difficulty level rises and as the player progresses through the game, they become more coordinated and will attempt to surround and/or flank Gene. They can also use team attacks, such as jumping on each other's back to flying kick Gene. Each enemy, when defeated, has a small chance to spawn a demon from their corpses, which are challenging enemies on par with sub-bosses. Defeating those demons will always award the player with large sums of money, technique scrolls or roulette scrolls. Certain demon battles are guaranteed in specific portions of the game.

Additional techniques can be found in stages in the form of technique scrolls. Techniques and roulette moves can also be purchased or sold at the shop, located on the map screen. Also accessible from the map is a casino, which contains a number of minigames, including slots, blackjack, poker, chihuahua racing and a fighting arena.

== Plot ==
In the game's backstory, a fallen angel became the Demon King Angra, whose demonic army invaded the world. However, a man holding the power of God within his arms defeated Angra, sending him into exile once again. The man was then given the title of "God Hand" by the people he saved. A clan of humans was established to protect the God Hands as it is said that anyone who possesses it will be "capable of becoming either god or demon". The main protagonist is Gene, a 23-year-old fighter who has one of the God Hands, which is sought after by a group of demons. Though he is outspoken and macho, he has a keen sense of justice. Gene is accompanied by Olivia, a 19-year-old descendant of the clan who once protected the God Hands. After the demons kill her family, she fled with one of the God Hands, grafting it onto Gene upon meeting him when he saves her from bandits attempting to take the God Hand from her and gets his right arm removed in the process.

The main villains are the Four Devas, a demonic society attempting to resurrect Angra for world domination. The members include the leader Belze, the cigar addicted officer Elvis, the flirty circus ringmaster Shannon and Azel, also called the "Devil Hand", a human that also possesses one of the God Hands and earlier joined the Devas to achieve his own goals. The game features a number of recurring minor enemies whom Gene meets, including an identical duo of extremely brawny yet extravagantly dressed homosexual men who flirt with Gene every chance they get; the trio responsible for removing Gene's original arm; a gorilla wearing a lucha libre wrestling mask and outfit; a pot-belly black garbed ninja master; an afro-sporting martial artist with his two girlfriends; an android warrior sent by Belze twice to stop Gene; an aspiring rock duo who were originally aspiring musicians that sold their souls to the demons in exchange for power; and a group of dwarfs dressed in Super Sentai-style clothing with playing card emblems on their costumes. Nearly all battles are revealed by comical gags and dialogue. Once Gene defeats Azel at the Tower of Angra, Angra awakens from inside Azel's body; Azel then rips off his God Hand and entrusts it to Gene, not wanting to be controlled. Now with both God Hands, Gene defeats Angra and rescues Olivia.

== Development ==
The game was first announced in April 2006 along with the use of a small teaser page on the Clover Studio website. The game was developed by the team responsible for Resident Evil 4. Development was supervised by Shinji Mikami, best known for the Resident Evil series of survival horror games, and was produced by Atsushi Inaba. The original idea for God Hand came about during a conversation between the two about the current state of action games; they found that many games in the genre at the time focused on the use of weapons and had gotten away from hand to hand combat. Mikami expanded this in 2020 saying that the initial concept started sometime in 1999 when he played Final Fight Revenge, a game based on a popular arcade series he liked. He was disappointed with Revenge, calling it "shit," and decided to one day make a better beat 'em up.

Mikami later approached Inaba with a poster depicting two stylized fists, meant to exemplify the kind of original game he wanted the two to create. Originally, God Hand was to focus solely on "hardcore action" without much humor. However, after showing a trailer for the game at the 2006 Electronic Entertainment Expo (E3) which contained some comic relief, the team decided to integrate a large amount of comedy into the game based on the viewers' reactions. Inaba stated that God Hand is "aimed at hardcore gamers," which is shown in its hard difficulty. Unlike Viewtiful Joe and Ōkami, the design team had no particular goal when designing the graphical style of God Hand other than that they wanted it to look more realistic. While God Hand appears to share many elements with classic manga and anime, such as Fist of the North Star, MD Geist and JoJo's Bizarre Adventure, no specific anime was cited as inspiration, but Inaba notes the game "shares that same style as '80s action anime."

There are a few differences between the North American and Japanese versions of the game. Among minor alterations, such a few signs being changed, the "Chihuahua Curry" power-up was renamed to "Puppy Pizza" in the English localization. A free Roulette called "Pan Drop", which gives the user short-lived invincibility in return for taking some damage, was removed from the American version due to the trope of a pan falling on someone's head being too intrinsic to Japanese comedy to be understood by Western audiences. However, another technique called "Head Slicer," which allows the player to decapitate an enemy, was featured in the North American localization, instead of the Japanese one due to CERO censorship policy in Japan. Masafumi Takada from Grasshopper Manufacture composed the game's soundtrack, with one track contributed by Jun Fukuda. The score contains many throwbacks to older video game music, and is heavily influenced by 1960s and 1970s theme songs and other genres, including techno, rave, rock and funk. Takada was told by Mikami that due to the game's hardcore nature, the soundtrack should be composed to "relax things a little bit". Takada's score utilizes motifs in the game's boss battle songs because many of them are fought more than once; Takada hoped that using different arrangements and orchestrations would remind players of older encounters with each boss. The soundtrack itself, God Tracks, is composed of 23 tracks and was packaged with the Japanese version of the game. A 128-page player's guide titled God Hand Official Guide Book was published by Capcom in Japan on October 7, 2006.

== Reception ==
Reception

Aggregate score
Aggregator	Score
Metacritic	73/100

Review scores
Publication	Score
1Up.com	8/10
Computer and Video Games	8.2/10
Edge	7/10
Electronic Gaming Monthly	6.33/10
Eurogamer	8/10
Famitsu	26/40
G4	4/5
Game Informer	6/10
GamePro	3.5/5
GameRevolution	B+
GamesMaster	75%
GameSpot	8/10
GameSpy	3.5/5
GamesRadar+	8/10
GameTrailers	6.4/10
GameZone	8.1/10
IGN	3/10
Official U.S. PlayStation Magazine	7/10
PALGN	8/10
Play	89%
PlayStation: The Official Magazine	8/10
VideoGamer.com	8/10
The A.V. Club	C+
The Sydney Morning Herald	3.5/5

Upon release, the game initially received "mixed or average reviews" according to video game review aggregator Metacritic. God Hand received almost universal praise for its combat system and an attempt at adhering to an "old-school brawler" formula, attributes which the same critics found to overshadow glaring flaws in its graphics, play control, level design, and camera. Official U.S. PlayStation Magazine opened its review by commenting, "God Hand is a terrible, terrible game, yet I can't stop playing it. There's just something horrifically appealing about how bad it is in almost every conceivable way." In Japan, God Hand was listed on Famitsu's "Top 10 Reader's Most Wanted" for a few weeks. Famitsu also gave the game one six, two sevens, and one six, for a total of 26 out of 40.

Sean McCabe of 411Mania gave the game a score of 9.6 out of 10, stating: "I have to say ordinarily I'd try to balance out my opinion on a game. But with all the negativity this game has garnered from others, I'll just say what I feel. This is the best game of its kind in 15 years and one of the best games of the 128-bit generation, a genuine masterpiece. It is not for everybody, probably far from that, but I really enjoyed this game and want to make that crystal clear." However, "D.W." of the same site gave it 5.5 out of 10, stating, "It's a shame that this had to be Clover's last title, but if God Hand was the best they could do, I can certainly see why they're not around anymore." The Sydney Morning Herald gave the game three-and-a-half stars out of five, exclaiming, "Like a bizarre mixture of WWE Smackdown and Benny Hill, God Hand is one of the quirkiest, silliest and funniest games to come along in some time." However, Maxim gave it three stars out of five, saying that it "may lack polish and production values, but like a trailer-park hooker, it still manages to be lovable trash." The A.V. Club gave the game a C+ and stated, "Playing this flawed, oddball offering is like flushing your neurotransmitters with Red Bull—painful, mind-expanding, and occasionally laughter-inducing."

Despite IGN giving God Hand a score of 3 out of 10 during its original release, the website ranked the game at #100 for their "Top 100 PlayStation 2 Games" list in 2010. Independent PlayStation Magazine listed God Hand among the "11 PS2 Games You Need to Play (But Haven't)". God Hand was a nominee for "Best Fighting Game" at the 2006 Spike Video Game Awards, but lost to Mortal Kombat: Armageddon. Rab Florence of the Scottish television series VideoGaiden claimed God Hand to be one of the best games ever made. The presenter summarized his review by stating, "What an epitaph for Clover Studio: We made one of the best games of all time and it was just a game about punching people".

=== Sales and legacy ===
The game was the fifth best-selling game during the week of its release in the country, selling 48,280 units. Capcom managed to both ship and sell nearly 60,000 copies of the game in the country by the end of 2006. God Hand was later re-released under the CapKore line of budget titles and the PlayStation The Best range.

God Hand is the final game of Clover Studio, which was closed after the game's release in North America. Retrospectively, the game is considered a cult classic, having gained a cult following and a generally favorable retrospective reception. The Capcom staff thought about including Gene as a playable character in their fighting game Marvel vs. Capcom 3: Fate of Two Worlds, but was replaced by Amaterasu from Ōkami. In 2010, the game was included as one of the titles in the book 1001 Video Games You Must Play Before You Die. Following Asura's Wrath's release, developer CyberConnect2 revealed that they felt the game would serve to satisfy fans wanting a sequel to God Hand. They were later pleased that people had seen the deliberate similarities between the two games.

Many of the individuals who worked on God Hand at Clover Studio went on to make games at PlatinumGames. God Hand's frantic combat style still persist in games they later released, such as MadWorld, Bayonetta, Metal Gear Rising: Revengeance, and Shinji Mikami's own Vanquish.
