= Viewtiful Joe: Double Trouble! =

2005 video game

- North American box art
- Developer: Clover Studio
- Publisher: Capcom
- Director: Junichi Ota
- Producer: Atsushi Inaba
- Designers: Ryo Fujii; Yuichi Niijima
- Writer: Hideki Kamiya
- Composer: Takeshi Miura
- Series: Viewtiful Joe
- Platform: Nintendo DS
- Release: JP: November 2, 2005; NA: November 8, 2005; EU: February 24, 2006; AU: March 10, 2006
- Genres: Beat 'em up, platform
- Mode: Single-player

Viewtiful Joe: Double Trouble!, known in Japan as Viewtiful Joe: Scratch!, (Note: Japanese: ビューティフル ジョー スクラッチ！, Hepburn: Byūtifuru Jō Sukuracchi!) is a 2005 beat 'em up game developed by Clover Studio and published by Capcom for the Nintendo DS. It was first released in 2005 in Japan and North America. Capcom partnered with Nintendo to distribute the game in Europe and Australia in early 2006. Viewtiful Joe: Double Trouble! is the fourth game released in the Viewtiful Joe series.

The game's story opens on the set of director Captain Blue's new action movie in an amusement park called Movieland. When a mysterious group of villains known as Madow steal the only copy of the film, the superhero Viewtiful Joe and his younger sister Jasmine quickly give chase.

Gameplay in Viewtiful Joe: Double Trouble! is a mix of the platforming and beat 'em up video game genres. The DS touchscreen is a key feature of the game's controls, enabling players to utilize Viewtiful Joe's unique VFX powers in order to battle enemies and solve puzzles. These include being able to split the level in half horizontally or to swap the top screen to the touchscreen and vice versa. The game was relatively well received by critics, but it sold poorly.

== Gameplay ==
The Slide and Touch VFX Powers let the player swap the top screen for the bottom in order to flip switches with the touchscreen.

Viewtiful Joe: Double Trouble! looks and plays similarly to its console counterparts Viewtiful Joe and Viewtiful Joe 2. The game is presented with 3D graphics set on a 2D plane and has both platforming and side-scrolling beat 'em up elements. Both screens on the DS feature the same gameplay with the top screen showing a magnified view of the player character Joe. The player controls Joe throughout a series of stages, or "episodes", which are divided into subsections with set goals such as defeating a group of enemies or reaching a checkpoint. Players combat enemies with punches and kicks and dodge enemy attacks by ducking and leaping upward. Successfully dodging an attack dazes the enemy, allowing the player to counterattack. Defeating enemies and destroying certain boxes grant players coins called "V-Medals", which contribute to the overall score called "V-Points". Performing combo moves on enemies displays "V-Marks", which act as a bonus by converting to V-Points as well. Finally, V-Points are awarded at the end of each stage objective, with more points given depending on the player's performance, such as how skillfully and quickly it was completed and how much damage the player took. V-Points can be used at certain stage checkpoints to purchase new attacks and items.

Much of the gameplay is centered around Joe's "Viewtiful Effects (VFX) Power", which is used in combat and puzzle solving. VFX Power is represented by a gauge located beneath the player's health. The gauge drains when in use but automatically replenishes itself. If it empties completely, Joe will temporarily lose his superpowers and will take more damage from enemies. The total length of the gauge can be extended by collecting "V-Tapes" scattered about each stage. There are five VFX Powers, and many of them are required to be combined for some puzzles. The first ability, "Slow", will decrease the speed of everything onscreen, increasing the player's reaction time and attack strength. "Scratch" is performed by rapidly scratching the touchscreen and lets the player shake the screen around to make random pieces of debris fall on enemies and to dislodge larger objects. "Split" allows the player split the stage in half by drawing a horizontal line across the touchscreen." It is used to shift props in the background (such as flowing water), allows the player to traverse walls, and moves platforms and objects into or out of the player's perspective. The final two powers are used in conjunction with one another. "Slide" swaps the bottom screen with the top, both causing enemies to tremble in fear of Joe and giving the player access to more attacks. After using Slide, "Touch" allows the player to flip switches or turn gears in the background. The combination of these two powers is also used to remove small, normally indestructible enemies, such as bats, from gameplay by tapping them on the touchscreen.

== Plot ==
Unlike the other games in the series, Viewtiful Joe: Double Trouble! takes place primarily in the game's depiction of the real world instead of its fictional world of movies. The story is set in Movieland, an action film-styled theme park. The game opens on the set of a film starring movie hero and director Captain Blue and an aspiring actress named Jasmine. Just as Blue comes to the girl's rescue at a critical moment in the film, Jasmine's brother Joe, dressed as his alter ego Viewtiful Joe, steals the scene. Joe's girlfriend Silvia shows up, greeting Blue and Jasmine and inquiring why they are there. Jasmine explains her ambition to become like Junko, a legendary actress from the past. Suddenly, a group of villains crash the set and make off with a canister containing the reel of Blue's film. Wasting no time, Joe sets out after them. Joe quickly realizes he cannot use his "Movie Energy" to transform into Viewtiful Joe in the real world. To solve this, Blue has Silvia record Joe on a special movie camera called a "V-Cam".

Joe travels through several park attractions, always one step behind the henchmen that possess Blue's film. His sister Jasmine also pursues Blue's film, finding it important because it contains her acting debut. Each time the duo catches up to the film, he is forced to fight an action cinema character whose "hero-ness" has been stolen by an organization called Madow. They include the robotic policeman Gadget-Cop, the android Killer Hands, the size-changing Alter Woman, and the fly-like Meta Rangers Digi and Log. Each one that Joe defeats seemingly comes to his or her senses. Joe and Jasmine eventually face a cloud-like entity calling itself Queen Heinderella, the leader of Madow. After easily overpowering Joe, Heinderella reveals to the siblings that she desires the film because it contains the very essence of Captain Blue himself, the "Super Hero-ness". The two eventually reach an attraction titled "Viewtiful Joe - The Ride", which terminates in battle with Blade Master Alastor, Joe's rival from past entries in the Viewtiful Joe series. After a heated battle between Joe's Six Majin robot and Alastor's own Rex Majin, Heinderella appears again and takes Blue's film. With Alastor's advice, Joe and Jasmine travel to a large castle in the center of the park in the game's last episode.

Joe and Jasmine reach Heinderella in the throneroom of the castle, where she transforms the top of the structure into a giant, mechanized monstrosity, which Joe fights and destroys it. He is then confronted by a humanoid Heinderella, who proceeds to steal Joe's hero-ness from him, leaving him devoid of his superpowers. All the action film heroes Joe has met during his mission suddenly arrive and give up their own hero-ness to Heinderella. The queen admits that everything had been planned out from the beginning and explains her intent Joe's power for world domination. A powerless Viewtiful Joe is quickly disabled by her and falls helpless to the ground. With encouragement from Jasmine and Captain Blue, Joe regains his hero-ness and defeats Heinderella in a final battle. Heinderella reveals herself to be the late actress Junko, Joe and Jasmine's mother. Prior to the game's events, Junko had once been rich and successful with her acting career. However, Junko's dreams were dashed as her career plummeted shortly thereafter, and she coincidentally died from injuries suffered from a car crash while on her way to an audition. She explains that she was allowed one day to visit her children from heaven and that she used it to teach her kids to follow their dreams and to test their value of fighting for justice. Junko says farewell to them, and as the reunion ends, a new threat arises somewhere in the distance. Using the sense of justice instilled in her by her mother, Jasmine transforms herself into a super heroine, and she and Joe set off to face it together.

== Development ==
Viewtiful Joe: Double Trouble! was developed by Clover Studio, a subsidiary of Capcom. The game was first announced under the working title Viewtiful Joe DS at the Electronic Entertainment Expo (E3) in 2004 as an early third-party Nintendo DS release. Development of Viewtiful Joe: Double Trouble! took one year to complete using a team of twenty people helmed by director Junichi Ota and producer Atsushi Inaba. Hideki Kamiya, who was responsible for some previous Viewtiful Joe titles, acted as an advisor and a scenario writer for the game. Takeshi Miura composed the soundtrack.

As Double Trouble! features 3D graphics like the previous installments in the series, Inaba explained that the most difficult aspect of the game's development was bringing the world of Viewtiful Joe to the DS with regard to the handheld's limitations, specifically the number of polygons possible for display on the screen. The game requires use of the D-pad, facebuttons, and the DS touchscreen throughout the course of gameplay. Inaba stressed that the touchscreen functionality was designed for the player's finger instead of the DS stylus, as it creates a much more fluid experience during gameplay.

== Reception ==
Reception

Aggregate score
Aggregator	Score
Metacritic	73/100

Review scores
Publication	Score
Edge	7/10
Electronic Gaming Monthly	7.5/10 (Note: Three critics of Electronic Gaming Monthly gave the game each a score of 8/10, 7.5/10, and 7/10.)
Eurogamer	7/10
Famitsu	32/40
Game Informer	7.5/10
GameSpot	7.6/10
GameSpy	3.5/5
GameZone	8.5/10
IGN	8.5/10
Nintendo Life	6/10
Nintendo Power	7/10
Nintendo World Report	5.5/10
The Times	3/5

The game received "mixed or average reviews" according to the review aggregation website Metacritic. IGN stated, "The game does have its quirks, mostly boiling down to the technical limitations: it's not as fast or energetic as past Viewtiful Joe games, and the touch screen sensitivity can get a little wonky in the heat of the battle. But even with these minor oddities, this game is one of the most fun and creative ways to move a 'traditional' console game onto the Nintendo DS." GameSpot had a similar opinion, remarking that it "is a good place for the beloved superhero to break into handheld games" but that "[t]he action and puzzle-solving do feel a bit repetitive at times, and the touch screen VFX powers take a bit of getting used to." Others thought it was excellent, such as 1Up.com, who stated that "Double Trouble! delivers a refreshingly solid, worthwhile action romp. Joe runs, jumps, punches, and defies the laws of physics just like in the console VJ titles, and a handful of new touch-panel VFX powers provide clever twists." GamePro said, "Besides the creative use of the DS touchpad, Capcom did a great job translating the cartoonish style of the Viewtiful Joe franchise onto the Nintendo handheld. Still, the game is somewhat short, with no extra content save for buying new moves. But like the summer action blockbusters he tries to emulate, Viewtiful Joe: Double Trouble is fun while it lasts." (Note: GamePro gave the game two 4.5/5 scores for graphics and control, and two 4/5 scores for sound and fun factor.)

Famitsu reported that Viewtiful Joe: Double Trouble! sold approximately 5,661 units in Japan between November 2 and November 27, 2005.

The game received a number of honors from IGN during its coverage of E3 in 2005 including "Best DS Game", "Best Action Game" on the DS, "Best Graphics" on the DS, and "Most Innovative Design" on the DS. It additionally won "Most Innovative Design" for the DS in IGN's reflection on the year 2005.
