= Viewtiful Joe 2 =

2004 video game

- North American PS2 cover art
- Developer: Clover Studio
- Publisher: Capcom
- Director: Masaaki Yamada
- Producer: Atsushi Inaba
- Designer: Masato Kimura
- Writer: Hideki Kamiya
- Composers: Sayaka Morita; Masami Ueda
- Series: Viewtiful Joe
- Platforms: GameCube, PlayStation 2
- Release: NA: November 18, 2004 (GC); NA: December 7, 2004 (PS2); JP: December 16, 2004; EU: April 1, 2005; AU: April 15, 2005
- Genres: Beat 'em up, platform
- Mode: Single-player

Viewtiful Joe 2, known in Japan as Viewtiful Joe 2: Secret of the Black Film, (Note: Japanese: ビューティフル ジョー2 ブラックフィルムの謎, Hepburn: Byūtifuru Jō Tsū Burakku Firumu no Nazo) is a 2004 beat 'em up game developed by Clover Studio and published by Capcom for the GameCube and PlayStation 2. The game's story begins where the original Viewtiful Joe left off, with the beginning of an alien invasion of Movieland by a villainous organization called "Gedow". The group is led by an unseen being known as the "Black Emperor", whose proclaims his goal to collect the special Rainbow Oscars, seven statuettes which contain the "power of the happy ending". Straight from their previous adventure, superhero Viewtiful Joe and his girlfriend Sexy Silvia quickly charge themselves with stopping Gedow's evil plans.

Very similar to its predecessor, Viewtiful Joe 2 is a combination of 2D and 3D cel-shaded graphics with action, platforming, and beat 'em up gameplay elements. Using either of the characters Viewtiful Joe or Sexy Silvia, the player must utilize "VFX Powers" in order to battle enemies and solve puzzles. An integral part of the gameplay, these special abilities include being able to slow down, speed up, zoom into, or replay the onscreen action. Also akin to the original game, Viewtiful Joe 2 sold modestly but garnered considerable praise from critics due to its stylish graphics and gameplay.

== Gameplay ==
The Replay VFX Power allows Sexy Silvia to attack three times in succession for triple the normal damage.

Viewtiful Joe 2 is a 2D beat 'em up which combines side-scrolling and platforming. The player takes control of either of the characters Joe or Silvia to complete tasks within each stage, such as defeating enemies and bosses, and solving puzzles. Within Movieworld, Joe has "VFX Powers" such as Slow (similar to bullet-time), Mach Speed, and Zoom at his disposal to defeat the enemy. He is joined by girlfriend Silvia, who has also acquired VFX powers. However, Silvia has "Replay", which allows her to record and repeat an event three times in succession, instead of Joe's Mach Speed. The Replay power must be used wisely, as although it allow the player to do three times the amount of damage on an enemy, being hit while using it will incur three times the amount of damage to the player.

During the game, the player utilize a gameplay mechanic called "Viewtiful Switch" in order to swap between Joe and Silvia at any time. The two characters share both their amount of health and the VFX meter. Holding the switch button down for a certain amount of time enables the two player characters to use a special attack involving the transformable robot Six Machine. At intervals between stages, V-Points can be spent to purchase new moves for either Joe or Silvia, or to improve their existing powers, which includes making Joe's Mach Speed more effective or upgrading Silvia's Desperados. V-Points can additionally be spent to give the player more maximum health, add extra lives, or be used to buy power-ups such as the VFX Turbo Charger, which slows the drainage of the VFX Gauge.

Aside from the main game, Viewtiful Joe 2 also contains an optional gameplay extra called the "36 Chambers of Viewtiful", a series of stages which test the player's skills. The objectives include defeating a set number of enemies or scoring a number of V-Points within a time limit, and dodging an onslaught of swords without dying.

== Plot ==
The plot of Viewtiful Joe 2 continues immediately from the ending of the previous game. Having just saved Movieland, Viewtiful Joe and his girlfriend (and new partner) Sexy Silvia learn from Captain Blue that the world will be threatened twice more. Joe and Silvia leave Captain Blue's space station to attend to an alien invasion from the forces of Gedow. The leader of Gedow, the Black Emperor, suddenly attacks Captain Blue and turns him into a statue called a "Rainbow Oscar", one of seven in a set that represents Movieland's power of the happy ending. With their power, the Black Emperor intends to conquer Movieland.

Cast off to "the fringes" of Movieland by Gedow, Joe and Silvia fight their way through a prehistoric film and defeat the Tyrannosaurus rex soldier, Big John. Joe and Silvia obtain a Rainbow Oscar from Big John just as Joe's father Jet arrives in the theater and demands that they come back to the real world and clean up the mess they made. Silvia manages to convince Jet to help them rescue Captain Blue, and Jet agrees by setting up new films for her and Joe to journey through in search of the Rainbow Oscars.

Joe and Silvia continue their battle against Gedow through an adventure film in an ancient temple, where a narcoleptic golem named Flinty Stone guards the second Rainbow Oscar, and then journey into a futuristic film where Gedow's top scientist Dr. Cranken and his creation Cameo Leon reveal the Black Emperor's plan to combine the Oscars with an evil reel of celluloid called the Black Film. Later, Joe's rival Alastor interferes during a samurai movie and tries to steal the spotlight. Jet changes films after Alastor is defeated, but unwittingly puts on the Black Film and sends its evil into Movieland, which also transforms Alastor into a murderous beast. After Joe defeats Alastor a second time, Jet destroys the Black Film.

With four Rainbow Oscars, Joe and Silvia are sent to a movie that takes place in the frozen mountains, where Frost Tiger (brother of Fire Leo, a boss from the previous game) protects the fifth Oscar and demands that Joe prove his inner strength in order to be worthy of it. Though successful, Joe's victory is short-lived when he is fooled by an impostor Silvia into giving Gedow the Oscars. Faced with his disastrous mistake, Joe and Silvia return to the original Captain Blue movie where they encounter Dr. Cranken again. The mad scientist reveals the impostor Silvia as Miss Bloody Rachel, a shapeshifting android programmed to destroy the heroes. As Rachel transforms into the previous bosses to fight back, Joe and Silvia attempt to reason with her by introducing the concept of a heart to her programming. Slowly, Rachel begins to understand and eventually chooses to side with the heroes. After Joe and Silvia finish off Dr. Cranken for good, Rachel gives them the sixth Rainbow Oscar.

The final movie, a science-fiction film set in deep space, is where the Black Emperor and the last Rainbow Oscar reside. When confronted by the heroes, the Black Emperor throws a fully restored Black Film onto the projector and uses its added power to summon his giant robot Dark Kaiser. Joe and Silvia summon their own "Six x Six Majin" to destroy Dark Kaiser and recover the last Oscar, but Jet suddenly appears in the movie and steals all seven. Revealing a Black V-Watch on his wrist, Jet transforms into the Dark Emperor and thanks Joe for giving him the Oscars, then infuses their power into himself to become Jet Black, the Dark Hero.

Now able to use his Movieland powers in the real world, Jet Black crashes the Viewtiful Awards Ceremony, leaving Joe and Silvia powerless to stop him. As they put up a futile effort to fight back, the crowd starts cheering for Joe and Silvia, which gives them the power to transform and ultimately defeat Jet Black. Captain Blue is restored to normal and reveals that Jet was his best friend and cinematographer, but had found the Black Film one day and became entranced by its power and that of the Rainbow Oscars. In the end, it is revealed that all Jet really wanted was to prove himself as a hero to his own son Joe.

As Joe and Jet reconcile, a dark castle appears in the distance, heralding the arrival of Captain Blue's last foreseen threat. Jet explains that the secret of the Black Film and his Black V-Watch lies within the castle, as well as an enemy unlike any other. Undeterred by Jet's ominous warning, Viewtiful Joe and Sexy Silvia strike a pose as they set out to save the world once more.

== Development ==
Viewtiful Joe 2 was developed by "Team Viewtiful", a part of Capcom's subsidiary Clover Studio. The game was produced by Atsushi Inaba and directed by Masaaki Yamada. Hideki Kamiya, the director of the original Viewtiful Joe, contributed to the storyline scenario of the sequel. At the time, Kamiya was signed on as director of Ōkami, but he wanted to write the story of Viewtiful Joe 2 to ensure continuity. Kumiko Suekane once again supervised the character designs, and Masami Ueda and Sayaka Morita co-composed the game's soundtrack. Suleputer released the soundtrack on a double album titled Viewtiful Joe + Viewtiful Joe 2 Original Soundtrack in Japan on December 22, 2004, which includes the musical scores from both games.

Development on Viewtiful Joe 2 began in the August 2003, shortly after the release of the first Viewtiful Joe on the GameCube. The game was officially announced by Capcom on April 21, 2004. Despite Inaba's statement that he does not like to create sequels, he said that he did want to create another Viewtiful Joe game to include several elements that they could not fit into the original game. Inaba also noted that the team took into account the difficulty of the first game and attempted to make Viewtiful Joe 2 accessible to both casual and hardcore gamers. The GameCube and PS2 versions were developed simultaneously and feature the same content. In early previews of the game, Silvia and Joe were shown onscreen fighting at the same time, hinting at cooperative gameplay. This feature was later dropped. When the Replay VFX Power was announced, Inaba was asked if any other VFX Powers would be included in the final game. He answered, "In terms of adding more -- there simply aren't enough buttons on the controller".

During the game's release in North America, Capcom and IGN held the "Be More Viewtiful! Sweepstakes", a contest in which entrants could win merchandise including either version of the game, a t-shirt with an "HMD" design, a skateboard, and a Viewtiful Joe 2 strategy guide by BradyGames. A desktop LCD clock was also released by Capcom during the game's North American debut. A demo of Viewtiful Joe 2 featured on North American PS2 preview discs made news when it was reported that playing the demo would cause a bug to completely erase all data on any inserted memory cards. Sony Computer Entertainment of America issued an apology and gave those affected a choice between several lesser-rated, previously released titles.

== Reception ==
Reception

Aggregate scores
Aggregator	Score
GameRankings	86% (GCN)
Metacritic	85/100 (GCN); 84/100 (PS2)

Review score
Publication	Score
Cube	8.6/10 (GCN)

Reviews for Viewtiful Joe 2 were generally positive. The GameCube and PS2 versions hold GameRankings scores of 85% and 84% respectively. Metacritic currently lists the respective versions at 86 and 85 out of 100. IGN ranked it as the 89th best PlayStation 2 game. The staff felt that it was an example of a quality sequel.

Famitsu magazine gave the GameCube version of Viewtiful Joe 2 a 28 out of 40 and gave the PS2 version a 27 out of 40. IGN gave a rating of 9.0, citing the game's deep and satisfying gameplay, and that "all sequels should be this good".

During Capcom's fiscal year 2004, Viewtiful Joe 2 sold 270,000 copies in North America and 80,000 copies in Japan. The game sold poorly in United Kingdom, failing to enter the 40 top-selling games during its week of release in the region. Although the ending for Viewtiful Joe 2 suggests an immediate continuation to the plot of the series, a Viewtiful Joe 3 has not been produced. Two spin-off games (Viewtiful Joe: Red Hot Rumble and Viewtiful Joe: Double Trouble!) were released in 2005. Clover Studio was dissolved in 2007 and all its intellectual properties defaulted to Capcom. Many of Clover's key members including Inaba and Kamiya formed the third-party developer PlatinumGames that same year. Capcom has stated that they have no plans to continue with the Viewtiful Joe series. Kamiya has expressed interest in finishing the story of the series, however unlikely that may be.
