= Atsushi Inaba =

Japanese video game producer

- 稲葉 敦志
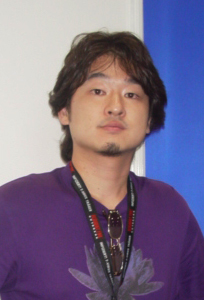
- Inaba in 2004
- Born: August 28, 1971 (age 55); Kanazawa, Ishikawa, Japan
- Occupations: Video game producer, businessman
- Years active: 1992–present
- Employers: Capcom (1998–2006); PlatinumGames (2006–present)
- Title: CEO

Atsushi Inaba (稲葉 敦志, Inaba Atsushi; born August 28, 1971) is a Japanese video game producer. He was the former CEO and producer of the Capcom subsidiary Clover Studio, who developed the games Viewtiful Joe, Ōkami, and God Hand. He is currently the head producer at the development division at PlatinumGames and the CEO since 2021, after years being vice-president in the company.

== Career ==
Inaba was born in Kanazawa, Ishikawa, in 1971.

Inaba first worked for Irem, specifically working on R-Type Leo. From there he joined Nazca Corporation and then SNK, where he did programming work on the Samurai Shodown series. After reading a want ad for Capcom in Famitsu magazine, Inaba joined the company in 1998 with hopes of working on the next Resident Evil game. He ended up working on Hideki Kamiya's Devil May Cry, and later produced games in the Ace Attorney and Steel Battalion series. Inaba, Kamiya, and Shinji Mikami, as well as other Capcom employees, began working at the company's new second-party developer Clover Studio in April 2004. Inaba acted as the team's producer and CEO, which managed to produce a few titles, including the critically acclaimed Ōkami. Inaba left Capcom in 2006 to form his own company, named SEEDS. Clover was being officially closed by Capcom in early 2007.

In October 2007, SEEDS merged with the company ODD. This new company was rebranded as PlatinumGames. He holds the position of head producer of the development division.

The company employs many former key members of Clover. In May 2008, PlatinumGames announced a four-game deal with Sega. The games involved in the development and publishing deal include Bayonetta, a "stylish action game" for the PlayStation 3 and Xbox 360 directed by Hideki Kamiya and featuring "a witch battling angels", a science-fiction RPG for the Nintendo DS called Infinite Space, MadWorld, an "ultra ultra violent" action game for the Wii with black and white Sin City-inspired graphics., and Vanquish, an action heavy third-person shooter directed by Shinji Mikami. A fifth game, Anarchy Reigns, was later added to this deal and was released in 2012 for PS3 and Xbox 360.

Inaba was also the producer for Metal Gear Rising: Revengeance after PlatinumGames picked up development from Kojima Productions.

In January 2022, it was announced that he would be the new CEO of PlatinumGames. Previously, Inaba was vice-president for years.

== Recognition ==
Inaba was ranked number 49 on IGN's Top 100 Game Creators of All Time list in 2009.

== Works ==
=== Video games ===
Year	Game	Role
1992	Bomber Man World	Planner
1992	R-Type Leo	Planner
1997	Samurai Shodown 64	Programmer
1998	Samurai Shodown 64: Warriors Rage	Programmer
2001	Resident Evil – Code: Veronica X	Assistant producer
2001	Devil May Cry	Technical cooperation
2001	Phoenix Wright: Ace Attorney	Producer
2001	Granbo	Producer
2002	Black Black	Producer
2002	Steel Battalion	Producer
2002	Phoenix Wright: Ace Attorney − Justice for All	Producer
2003	Viewtiful Joe	Producer
2004	Phoenix Wright: Ace Attorney − Trials and Tribulations	Producer
2004	Steel Battalion: Line of Contact	Producer
2004	Viewtiful Joe 2	Producer
2005	Viewtiful Joe: Red Hot Rumble	Producer
2005	Viewtiful Joe: Double Trouble!	Producer
2006	Ōkami	Producer
2006	God Hand	Producer
2009	MadWorld	Producer
2009	Infinite Space	Producer
2010	Vanquish	Producer
2012	Anarchy Reigns	Producer
2013	Metal Gear Rising: Revengeance	Producer
2013	The Wonderful 101	Producer
2014	Bayonetta 2	Producer
2014	The Legend of Korra	Executive producer
2015	Transformers: Devastation	Executive producer
2016	Star Fox Zero	Producer
2016	Star Fox Guard	Producer
2016	Teenage Mutant Ninja Turtles: Mutants in Manhattan	Executive producer
2017	Nier: Automata	Executive producer
2019	Astral Chain	Executive producer
2021	World of Demons	Executive producer
2022	Sol Cresta	Executive producer
2022	Babylon's Fall	Executive producer
2022	Bayonetta 3	Executive producer
2023	Bayonetta Origins: Cereza and the Lost Demon	Executive producer
2025	Ninja Gaiden 4	President

=== Canceled games ===
- Scalebound – Producer
- Lost Order – Producer
- Project G.G. – Producer
