= Viewtiful Joe: Red Hot Rumble =

2005 video game

- North American GameCube box art
- Developer: Clover Studio
- Publisher: Capcom
- Director: Masaaki Yamada
- Producer: Atsushi Inaba
- Designers: Ryo Fujii; Yuichi Niijima
- Composers: Mizuhata Shuichi; Naoto Tanaka
- Series: Viewtiful Joe
- Platforms: GameCube; PlayStation Portable
- Release: September 29, 2005: GameCube; JP: September 29, 2005; NA: November 8, 2005; EU: February 24, 2006; AU: March 10, 2006 PlayStation Portable; NA: March 22, 2006; JP: March 23, 2006; PAL: May 26, 2006
- Genres: Fighting, beat 'em up
- Modes: Single-player, multiplayer

Viewtiful Joe: Red Hot Rumble, known in Japan as Viewtiful Joe: Battle Carnival, (Note: Japanese: ビューティフル ジョー バトルカーニバル, Hepburn: Byūtifuru Jō Batoru Kānibaru) is a video game released by Capcom in 2005 for the GameCube and the PlayStation Portable. It combines platform fighter and beat 'em up gameplay, and features characters and elements from the Viewtiful Joe video game series and its accompanying animated series.

== Plot ==
Captain Blue is working on his latest film, and decides to hold a battle tournament between those who are auditioning to determine who will get the lead role. As the tournament progresses, the cast begins noticing unauthorized equipment appearing unexpectedly and strange occurrences on set that put them in danger. At the tournament's conclusion, Rachel is possessed by spirits housed within the film equipment, which have been attempting to sabotage the film and eliminate the actors, and merges with the film equipment to become the ghostlike creature Tsukumo. The heroes defeat Tsukumo, turning Rachel back to normal, and the spirits lament through her that they only wanted to star in the movie instead of always being stuck behind the scenes. Joe and the others remind the equipment how important they are to the film's production, pleasing and reassuring them. To everyone's surprise, Captain Blue decides to make Tsukumo the hero of his next film.

== Development ==
The game was originally announced under the title Viewtiful Joe: VFX Battle, and early rumors stated that it was to be released for the PlayStation 2, before the confusion was cleared up due to a translation error. Producer Atsushi Inaba noted that the game was inspired heavily by Nintendo's Super Smash Bros. Melee. Viewtiful Joe: Red Hot Rumble was originally developed as a two-player game rather than a four-player game. The PlayStation Portable version of the game features Dante from the Devil May Cry series as a playable character, along with several additional costumes based on characters from Devil May Cry and Viewtiful Joe: Double Trouble.

In Japan, the game featured a bonus stage set in the offices of V Jump magazine, which published the concurrently-produced Viewtiful Joe manga. In North America, the GameCube version featured in-game advertising promoting the Johnny Rockets restaurant chain.

== Reception ==
Reception

Aggregate score
| Aggregator | Score | |
| Aggregator | GameCube | PSP |
|---|---|---|
| Metacritic | 62/100 | 63/100 |

Review scores
| Publication | Score | |
| Publication | GameCube | PSP |
|---|---|---|
| Electronic Gaming Monthly | 6.5/10 (Note: Three critics of Electronic Gaming Monthly gave the GameCube version each a score of 4.5/10, 9/10, and 6/10.) | N/A |
| Eurogamer | 6/10 | N/A |
| Famitsu | 29/40 | 30/40 |
| Game Informer | 7/10 | 7/10 |
| GameRevolution | C− | N/A |
| GameSpot | 6.9/10 | 6.9/10 |
| GameSpy | 3/5 | 3.5/5 |
| GameTrailers | N/A | 6/10 |
| Hardcore Gamer | 2.75/5 | 3/5 |
| IGN | 5/10 | 6.4/10 |
| Nintendo Power | 6.5/10 | N/A |
| Nintendo World Report | 5/10 | N/A |
| Official U.S. PlayStation Magazine | N/A | 2.5/5 |
| Pocket Gamer | N/A | 2.5/5 |

The game received "mixed" reviews on both platforms according to the review aggregation website Metacritic. In Japan, Famitsu gave it a score of one eight and three sevens for the GameCube version, and one eight, two sevens, and one eight for the PSP version.

Aceinet of GameZone gave the GameCube version 7.2 out of 10, saying, "The game has some amazing graphics and a style that is hard to match. If you've never played a Viewtiful Joe game and you want a quick experience then RHR is a good place to start." Later, however, John Wrentmore gave the PSP version 7.3 out of 10, calling it "an out-of-control fighter experience never before seen on the PSP, but problems in the game design may confuse and irritate gamers." Edge gave the former console version's Japanese import seven out of ten, saying, "Through the crush of it all, Viewtiful Joe's pedigree for fusing entertainment and quality is clearly visible throughout the chaos, even if it doesn't necessarily shine." Funky Zealot of GamePro said in its December 2005 issue that the same console version "will likely be remembered as an amusing, if not inconsequential, fighting game detour of the franchise. Of course, you can expect Capcom to respond with more platformer installments." (Note: GamePro gave the GameCube version 4/5 for graphics, 3/5 for sound, and two 3.5/5 scores for control and fun factor.) Six issues later, Johnny K said of the latter, "Despite my annoyances with the controls and hit detection, there's plenty to enjoy in Red Hot Rumble, particularly if you're a huge fan of the show or the game series. The deep roster of characters is impressive, as is each one's unique attacks and abilities." (Note: GamePro gave the PSP version 4/5 for graphics, two 3.5/5 scores for sound and fun factor, and 3/5 for control.) However, Robert Workman of GameDaily gave the GameCube version a score of four out of ten, calling it "a clear example of a game that has its say on the planning stages and yet comes out completely different on the other, as it just never reaches the enjoyment level of the first two chapters in the series."
