= Hideki Kamiya =

Japanese video game designer and director

- 神谷 英樹
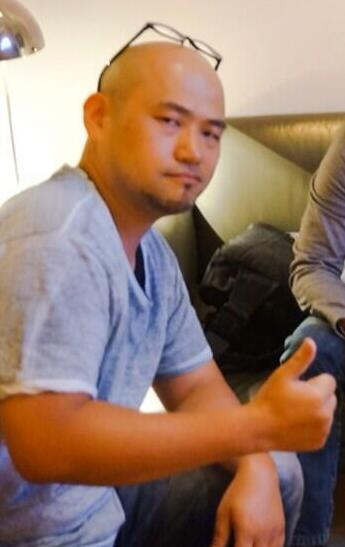
- Kamiya in 2014
- Born: December 19, 1970 (age 55); Matsumoto, Nagano, Japan
- Education: Kyorin University
- Occupations: Video game designer; director
- Years active: 1994–present
- Employer(s): Capcom (1994–2006); Clover Studio (2004–2006); PlatinumGames (2006–2023); Clovers (2023–present)
- Known for: Resident Evil 2; Devil May Cry; Viewtiful Joe; Ōkami; Bayonetta; The Wonderful 101

Hideki Kamiya (神谷 英樹, Kamiya Hideki; born December 19, 1970) is a Japanese video game designer and director. He is the founder of the independent studio Clovers and a co-founder of PlatinumGames. In 2009, he was named one of the top 100 game creators by IGN.

Kamiya began his career in 1994 with Capcom, directing Resident Evil 2 (1998), Devil May Cry (2001), Viewtiful Joe (2003), and Ōkami (2006). From 2004 to 2006, he worked for the Capcom subsidiary Clover Studio. After leaving Capcom, Kamiya and other former staff members founded PlatinumGames in 2006, where he served as vice president from 2017 to 2023. His projects with PlatinumGames include Bayonetta (2009) and The Wonderful 101 (2013). Kamiya left PlatinumGames in 2023 to form Clovers.

== Early life ==
Kamiya was born in Matsumoto, Nagano. At a young age, he became a fan of video games thanks to a neighbor who often invited him to play with his Epoch Cassette Vision console. Gaming appealed to Kamiya mainly due to the sounds it produced. While in junior school, he bought the Famicom. The first game he bought was Nuts & Milk. In high school, Kamiya bought a NEC PC-8801 to study programming, but ended up playing video games every day.

The first software he purchased for his PC-8801 MA computer was Hydlide 3: The Space Memories. He also loved monster movies such as Godzilla and Ultraman as a child.

As a game designer, Kamiya stated he has been most inspired by the games The Legend of Zelda: A Link to the Past and Gradius. His favorite action game is the original Castlevania. Other favorite games include Space Harrier, Cybernator, Punch-Out, Wonder Boy in Monster Land, Snatcher, Sorcerian, and Star Cruiser.

== Career ==
When reading an interview from the Family Computer Magazine that featured game creators Shigeru Miyamoto and Masanobu Endo, Kamiya decided he would become a video game developer. After graduating from college, Kamiya applied for jobs at various game developers. He was turned down by Sega and had an application accepted by Namco. However, Namco wanted him to be an artist rather than a game designer.

=== Resident Evil ===
Kamiya joined Capcom as a designer in 1994. His early works included planner of the original Resident Evil. The development of Resident Evil 2 was carried out by a 40- to 50-person group that would later be part of Capcom Production Studio 4. The game was directed by Kamiya, who led the team, which was composed of newer Capcom employees and over half of the staff from the original Resident Evil. In the initial stages of development, producer Shinji Mikami often had creative disagreements with Kamiya, and tried to influence the team with his own direction. He eventually stepped back to an overseeing role as producer, and only demanded to be shown the current build once a month.

To fulfill Capcom's sales plan of two million copies, director Kamiya tried to attract new customers with a more ostentatious and Hollywood-like story presentation. As Yoshiki Okamoto did not want to simply enforce the new direction, he had regular series writer Noboru Sugimura discuss the plot revisions with Mikami and the development staff. The planners redesigned the game from the ground up to fit the changes, and the programmers and other remaining members of the team were sent to work on Resident Evil Director's Cut, which was shipped with a playable preview disc of the new Resident Evil 2 version in order to promote the sequel and to apologize to the players for its belated release.

=== Devil May Cry ===
Kamiya was later the director of Devil May Cry, which started out as the earliest incarnation of Resident Evil 4. Initially developed for the PlayStation 2, the game was directed by Hideki Kamiya after producer Shinji Mikami requested that he create a new entry in the Resident Evil series. Around the turn of the millennium, Sugimura created a scenario for the title, based on Kamiya's idea to make a very cool and stylized action game. The story was based on unraveling the mystery surrounding the body of protagonist Tony, an invincible man with skills and an intellect exceeding that of normal people, his superhuman abilities explained with biotechnology. As Kamiya felt the playable character did not look brave and heroic enough in battles from a fixed angle, he decided to drop the prerendered backgrounds from previous Resident Evil installments and instead opted for a dynamic camera system. This new direction required the team to make a trip to Europe where they spent eleven days in the United Kingdom and Spain photographing things like Gothic statues, bricks, and stone pavements for use in textures. Though the developers tried to make the "coolness" theme fit into the world of Resident Evil, Mikami felt it strayed too far from the series' survival horror roots and gradually convinced all of the staff members to make the game independent from it. Kamiya eventually rewrote the story to be set in a world full of demons and changed the hero's name to "Dante". The cast of characters remained largely identical to that in Sugimura's scenario, although appearances of the hero's mother and father were written out of the story. The game's new title was revealed as Devil May Cry in November 2000.

The game was developed by Team Little Devils, a group of staff members within Capcom Production Studio 4. Some of the major gameplay elements were partially inspired by a bug found in Onimusha: Warlords. During a test-play, Kamiya discovered that enemies could be kept in the air by slashing them repeatedly, which led to the inclusion of juggles by gunfire and sword strikes in Devil May Cry. According to the director, Devil May Cry was designed from the ground up around Dante's acrobatics and combat abilities. The decision was made late in the development process to change the game to a more mission-based advancement, instead of the more open-ended structure of the Resident Evil games. Devil May Cry's difficulty was intentional, according to Kamiya, who called it his "challenge to those who played light, casual games."

Despite the success of the original Devil May Cry, the sequel was not created by Hideki Kamiya or Team Little Devils. The first notice Kamiya's team was given about any sort of sequel occurred during localization of Devil May Cry in North America and Europe, a move which greatly surprised Kamiya. Instead the project was handed over to Capcom Dev Studio 2. Since the game's release, Kamiya has expressed disappointment that he was not called on by his superiors at Capcom to direct Devil May Cry 2.

Although Kamiya did not direct the third game, Devil May Cry 3: Dante's Awakening, he still advised writer Bingo Morihashi in the characterization of the title character as well as his design. He also gave Morihashi freedom in terms of the story's retcons regarding Vergil's history.

Kamiya stated on Twitter that he was interested in remaking the original Devil May Cry game, although he was not employed by Capcom at the time.

=== Clover Studio ===
Kamiya directed the original Viewtiful Joe. The game was conceived as a "staff-focused project" aimed at increasing the skill of its creators, specifically director Kamiya. Kamiya provides the voice for Six Machine in the game.

In 2006, Kamiya worked as the director for Ōkami. Ōkami resulted from the combined ideas of Clover Studio. The game was originally built around "depict[ing] a lot of nature", but had no central concept or theme, according to Kamiya, who served as the game's director. Kamiya eventually created a minute-long demonstration movie showing a wolf running about a forest, with flowers blossoming in its wake, but still lacked any gameplay. Kamiya and other members of the team introduced ideas around the nature aspect and eventually led to the game's initial prototype, which Kamiya admitted was "incredibly boring to play". Eventually, they settled onto the gameplay found in the final product, with the core feature of allowing the player to pause the gameplay at any time to draw on the landscape to affect the world around them.

The gameplay style is a mix of action, platform, and puzzle gaming genres, and has been noted by many reviewers to have numerous similarities in overall gameplay style to The Legend of Zelda series, an inspiration that director Hideki Kamiya, a Zelda fan, has admitted has influenced his general game design.

Clover Studio was closed by Capcom in late 2006.

=== PlatinumGames ===
PlatinumGames was founded under the name Seeds, Inc. on August 1, 2006, by Shinji Mikami, Atsushi Inaba, and Hideki Kamiya.

In May 2008, the company, now renamed to PlatinumGames, announced a four-game deal with publisher Sega. The games involved in the development and publishing deal included Bayonetta, a "stylish action game" for the PlayStation 3 and Xbox 360 directed by Kamiya. The game was considered as the successor of Devil May Cry with Kamiya having used its latest sequel Devil May Cry 4 as part of his research. First announced at E3 2012, Kamiya directed The Wonderful 101 for the Wii U, which was released in September 2013. He also wrote the story to Bayonetta 2, released on the Wii U in October 2014.

Kamiya has stated he is interested in making a new Star Fox game, and due to a lot of fans asking him on Twitter repeatedly, he was encouraged to submit ideas to Nintendo without success. Eventually, PlatinumGames did end up working with Nintendo on the next installment of the Star Fox series, entitled Star Fox Zero, and its companion game Star Fox Guard, both of which were released in April 2016. Kamiya was working on Scalebound, a new game for Microsoft Studios until its cancellation in January 2017.

In October 2022, Hellena Taylor, the voice actress for the titular Bayonetta in the first two Bayonetta titles, revealed that she decided not to voice Bayonetta in Bayonetta 3, alleging that PlatinumGames offered her $4,000 for the role, an amount she found "insulting" and instead asked fans to boycott the video game. Days later, Bloomberg and VGC verified sources that allege that Taylor was initially offered a larger sum for the main role, and that the $4000 was a final offer from Kamiya for a cameo role near the end of development. Kamiya responded to Taylor's claims with a tweet reading "Sad and deplorable about the attitude of untruth. That's what all I can tell now." before temporarily deactivating his Twitter account.

In a December 2024 interview, Kamiya said that around April 2023, he and Inaba began to have disagreements regarding the company, and by July 2023, Kamiya found it impossible to work with Inaba and made plans to leave PlatinumGames. Kamiya said in a later interview that he felt that the direction that PlatinumGames was going in terms of game development was away from celebrating a creator's individuality, a factor that was emphasized during his time with Capcom Team 4. His departure was announced publicly in September 2023, and formally left PlatinumGames on October 12, 2023.

=== Clovers ===
During the months between July and October 2023, Kamiya was approached by Kento Koyama, another PlatinumGames employee that had worked on Project G.G. Koyama suggested that Kamiya found his own studio to create the games he wanted. As others in the studio also sympathized with Kamiya's decision to leave, Kamiya recognized the value of Koyama's suggestion. Koyama left PlatinumGames in July to establish Clovers, acting as president and CEO, with Kamiya joining after his own departure. The name was a play on the former Clover Studio name. At this point, Kamiya was under a one-year non-compete agreement to prevent him from working on any games, and kept his involvement with Clovers low-key. Several other PlatinumGames staff followed to join Clovers, with about 25 staff at its Tokyo and Osaka offices by December 2024. Funding for Clovers was provided by Kamiya and Koyama without any outside investors, and Kamiya planned to only take investment funds to finance specific games rather than the studio itself, in order to maintain its independence.

Initial plans at Clovers were to develop a new IP, but they soon realized the potential for a new Ōkami game, a desire that Kamiya had expressed during his time at PlatinumGames. They had discussions with Capcom to secure the opportunity, and once Kamiya's non-compete period ended, began to ramp up staffing at Clovers. The Ōkami sequel was publicly announced at The Game Awards 2024 in December 2024, with pre-production starting near that time. Kamiya said in 2025 that while the Clovers studio was solely focused on the Ōkami sequel, he hoped they could expand into more projects for Capcom and other publishers.

== Online presence ==
On Twitter, Kamiya is known for blocking large numbers of users for tweeting him in any language other than Japanese, including users responding in English to tweets he made exclusively in English. Kamiya's blocking has become an inside joke with fans, to the point that getting blocked or unblocked became a stretch reward for The Wonderful 101: Remastered Kickstarter.

== Works ==
=== Video games ===
Year	Game	Role
1996	Resident Evil	System planner
1996	Arthur to Astaroth no Nazomakaimura: Incredible Toons	Planner
1998	Resident Evil 2	Director
2001	Devil May Cry	Director, story
2002	Resident Evil Zero	Original game design
2003	Viewtiful Joe	Director
2004	Phoenix Wright: Ace Attorney − Trials and Tribulations	Japanese voice of Godot
2004	Viewtiful Joe 2	Story
2005	Viewtiful Joe: Double Trouble!	Story
2006	Ōkami	Director, story
2009	Bayonetta	Director, story
2013	The Wonderful 101	Director, story
2014	Bayonetta 2	Supervisor, story
2019	Astral Chain	Supervisor
2021	World of Demons	Supervisor
2022	Sol Cresta	Creative director, story
2022	Bayonetta 3	Supervising director, scenario
2023	Bayonetta Origins: Cereza and the Lost Demon	Supervising director, original story, chief scenario writer
TBA	Untitled Ōkami sequel	Director

=== Canceled projects ===
- Scalebound – Director, story
- Project G.G. – Director
