= Scalebound =

Cancelled video game

- Developer: PlatinumGames
- Publisher: Microsoft Studios
- Director: Hideki Kamiya
- Producers: Atsushi Inaba; Jean Pierre Kellams
- Designer: Yusuke Miyata
- Artist: Yong-hee Cho
- Writers: Hideki Kamiya; Jean Pierre Kellams; Kyoko Higo; Rich Bryant; Joseph Staten
- Composers: Hitomi Kurokawa; Naoto Tanaka; Christopher Lennertz
- Engine: Unreal Engine 4
- Platforms: Windows; Xbox One
- Release: Cancelled
- Genre: Action role-playing
- Modes: Single-player, multiplayer

Scalebound (Note: Japanese: スケイルバウンド, Hepburn: Sukeirubaundo) was an action role-playing game developed by PlatinumGames from 2013 until its cancellation in 2017. It was scheduled to be released in 2017 for Windows and Xbox One, but Microsoft Studios announced its cancellation in January 2017. In the game, players would assume control of Drew, and his dragon partner, Thuban. Players could use a variety of weapons to defeat enemies, and could issue commands to the dragon, which assisted players during battles. Unlike other games developed by PlatinumGames, the game was to put more focus on graphical qualities and the role-playing aspect instead of action.

== Gameplay ==
Scalebound was an action role-playing game played in a third-person perspective, in which players assumed control of Drew, as he progressed through the world of Draconis. Players are accompanied by a dragon called Thuban, who would assist Drew throughout the game. Drew and Thuban are bonded together, and Thuban's death would cause Drew to die as well and vice versa. Thuban is usually controlled by artificial intelligence, but players can give commands to the dragon when performing attacks. Drew can enter the Dragon Link mode, allowing the player to directly control the dragon from his perspective. In this mode, the perspective would shift to first-person, and Drew is very vulnerable to attacks. There are three types of dragons, each with different characteristics. The three types can be blended together through the game's customization options and the dragon's abilities, appearances and armor can be modified by the player. The dragon can be ridden, though not in the beginning of the game, and they can perform a special elemental attack with the berserker mode. The player can upgrade abilities by using the gems that enemies dropped sometimes.

In addition, players are equipped with melee weapons, such as swords and other ranged weapons. These weapons will eventually become degraded and lose their durability during combat. The game does not feature any crafting system, but players can obtain different weapons throughout the game. When encountering large enemies, players can swing to them and climb on them to perform attacks. Drew has a dragon arm, which can scan enemies for information, unleash pulse energy, and heal his dragon companion. The player can shapeshift into a half-dragon hybrid. When he shapeshifts, his abilities will be significantly strengthened. Players can gain skill points, which can be used to level-up Drew, by defeating enemies and taking care of Thuban like healing and assisting him in battle. Additional skill points would have given if players can defeat multiple enemies consecutively. The game featured a four-player co-operative multiplayer mode.

== Development ==
The game was under development by PlatinumGames. The concept for the game was created when Platinum established in 2006 but the studio decided to move to develop Bayonetta instead of making Scalebound. The studio attempted to re-pitch the game again after the completion of Bayonetta, and a prototype was made but it failed to generate any interest, and the studio moved on to develop The Wonderful 101. When the development of The Wonderful 101 was almost finished, the idea for Scalebound was revised, and the game's development officially began in 2013.

Director Hideki Kamiya considered the game a new experience for the studio, as it was something that they had never worked on before. The studio hoped that they could create a game whose gameplay would have been unlike any other game previously developed by Platinum. Kamiya described it as a big challenge for the studio. He also considered the collaboration between Platinum and Microsoft a leap forward for the studio. According to him, Bayonetta-styled action and reflexes is not the core focus of the game, but he promised that the game's combat "will remain at the quality that's always defined [Platinum's] action games". The team put more emphasis on graphics and visual quality to create a game that is "photo-realistic". The game was designed to be more accessible for new players and the team hoped that the game's fantasy setting can introduce it to a wider audience. Platinum also consulted Microsoft's user research labs to ensure that the game would suit the taste of a broad audience.

Scalebound would be the first action role-playing game developed by Platinum. Kamiya described the game as a dream come true for him, as he had always wanted to create a game where dragons are the players' companion as opposed to being enemies. In order to add a twist to the game's world and prevent it from being too typical, the team introduced Drew, a young man who comes from the modern world, to contrast with the fantasy setting of the game. The bonding between the game's protagonist and the dragon was not originally planned. Kamiya's original vision was to have monsters fighting against each other. However, they decided to add that later on because they wanted to increase player participation in the game. In order to tackle the problem of having two lead characters in a game, they focused the story on Drew and the gameplay on Thuban. As a result, Thuban can be customized extensively, while Drew cannot. Instead of the dragon, Platinum originally hoped to feature dinosaurs in the game, although the idea was later scrapped. It was once intended to be a dinosaur game, in which players can issue commands to other dinosaurs, for the Wii console.

Kamiya cited the 1987 Dragon Slayer action role-playing game Sorcerian as inspiration, including its fantasy theme, "gigantic monsters," different scenarios, "expansive possibilities", "tons of adventures" and enemies such as a hydra boss and "lots of amazing dragons". He also cited the 1987 PC-8801 MA release of the action role-playing game Hydlide 3, noting the influence of its "hardcore game design", as well as the dragons of the role-playing video game Dragon Quest.

The game's world, Draconis, features a giant mushroom that grows extensively. Pulse energy emanates from it that serves as the life foundation of every existing creature in the game. According to Yong-hee Cho, the game's art director, the Pulse took inspiration from the Force of Star Wars fame. Draconis is described to be non-linear which encourages exploration. When designing the game's world, the team hoped to strike a balance between realism and imagination. As a result, 80% of the game's world would be based on earth's landscape, while the remaining 20% would be environments shaped by the Pulse energy. According to Cho, when he first pitched his original enemy designs to Kamiya, they were rejected because they were considered to be too exaggerated. Kamiya later said that he wanted the enemies to be more realistic. In addition, the difficulty of enemies is not scaled according to Drew's strength and level, as Platinum hoped that without scaled difficulty, players can experience a sense of victory when they return to earlier areas to defeat easier enemies. Despite that, enemies behaviors change during the second encounter.

The initial deal between PlatinumGames and Microsoft was facilitated by agent Ben Judd. The game was officially announced at Microsoft Studios' press conference at E3 2014 with a cinematic trailer. The game missed E3 2015, but the game's gameplay was shown at Gamescom 2015, alongside Crackdown 3 and Quantum Break. The game's four-player co-operative multiplayer mode was also announced. Scalebound was set to be released worldwide for the Xbox One in late 2016 but was later delayed to 2017. The game's cancellation was announced on January 9, 2017.

Reflecting on the game's cancellation in May 2019, Platinum studio head Atsushi Inaba said it "wasn't easy" to see publisher Microsoft receive criticism for the decision as he felt "both sides failed", and that, ultimately, the game "didn't do all of the things that we needed to do as a developer". In February 2020, Inaba said that while Scalebound remains an intellectual property fully owned by Microsoft, PlatinumGames would want to return to it if given the opportunity to.

In a video interview with Cutscenes, Kamiya apologized for the game's cancellation and stated the development team were not experienced enough in creating a title with an emphasis on online features.

In September 2026, Kamiya stated that he's interested to revive the game.

== Legacy ==
According to Platinum, several elements from Scalebound were reworked to appear in Bayonetta 3.
