= Bayonetta (video game) =

2009 video game

- International cover art
- Developer: PlatinumGames (Note: PlayStation 3 version developed by Nex Entertainment; Wii U version developed by Bee Tribe; additional work for Windows by Little Stone Software and by Armature Studio for PlayStation 4 and Xbox One)
- Publisher: Sega (Note: Wii U and Nintendo Switch versions published by Nintendo)
- Director: Hideki Kamiya
- Producers: Yusuke Hashimoto: Akiko Kuroda (Wii U); Hitoshi Yamagami (Wii U); Atsushi Kurooka (PC)
- Designers: Hiroshi Shibata; Masaaki Yamada
- Artists: Mari Shimazaki; Ikumi Nakamura
- Writer: Hideki Kamiya
- Composers: List of composers: Norihiko Hibino; Takahiro Izutani; Masami Ueda; Hiroshi Yamaguchi; Rei Kondoh; Takayasu Sodeoka; Erina Niwa; Yoshitaka Suzuki; Naoto Tanaka
- Series: Bayonetta
- Platforms: PlayStation 3; Xbox 360; Wii U; Windows; Nintendo Switch; PlayStation 4; Xbox One
- Release: October 29, 2009: PlayStation 3, Xbox 360; JP: October 29, 2009; NA: January 5, 2010; AU: January 7, 2010; EU: January 8, 2010 Wii U; JP: September 20, 2014; NA/EU: October 24, 2014; AU: October 25, 2014 Windows; WW: April 11, 2017 Nintendo Switch; WW: February 16, 2018; JP: February 17, 2018 PlayStation 4, Xbox One; WW: February 18, 2020; JP: May 28, 2020 (PS4)
- Genres: Action-adventure, hack and slash
- Mode: Single-player

Bayonetta (Note: Japanese: ベヨネッタ, Hepburn: Beyonetta) is a 2009 action-adventure game developed by PlatinumGames and published by Sega. It was released for PlayStation 3 and Xbox 360 in Japan in October 2009, and in North America and Europe in January 2010. It was released on Wii U in September 2014, Windows in April 2017, Nintendo Switch in February 2018, and PlayStation 4 and Xbox One in February 2020.

Bayonetta takes place in Vigrid, a fictional city in Europe. The game stars the eponymous character, a witch who nominally wields a variety of powerful firearms but can also use her hair to shapeshift, summon powerful demons, and execute powerful attacks. Stricken with amnesia, Bayonetta travels to Vigrid hoping to learn the truth of her past, while seeking to thwart a plot by her enemies, the angels of Heaven, to bring about apocalypse on Earth.

The game features a rating system, which gives players a grade based on their performance, and a combat system similar to the Devil May Cry series. Although unlike Devil May Cry, which features a live Style Rank to directly judge the player, Bayonetta (and subsequent Platinum action games) feature an arena based ranking system, which judges players based on variables such as time, combo points and damage at the end of each individual fight which then gets tallied up at the end of each chapter to determine the final rank.

Bayonetta was the third project released by PlatinumGames, which was founded by former Clover Studio employees. Development began in January 2007, with Hideki Kamiya as the director. The development team's name, "Team Little Angels," is a play on the name of the team who developed the first Devil May Cry game, "Team Little Devils." According to Kamiya, Bayonetta was completely original, though he drew some inspirations from Scandinavian mythology and played Devil May Cry 4 for reference. The game was designed to have a core theme of "sexiness" and to feature "fashionable" characters. To this end, Kamiya and artist Mari Shimazaki spent more than a year creating Bayonetta's design. Several demos were released prior to launch.

Bayonetta received critical acclaim upon its release. The game was praised for its combat, presentation, and soundtrack, but also drew some criticism for its story and quick time events. The game was nominated for and won several end-of-the-year accolades, had sold over one million units worldwide by 2010, and is considered to be one of the greatest video games ever made. An anime film adaptation by Gonzo, Bayonetta: Bloody Fate, was released in Japan in November 2013. The game was followed by Bayonetta 2 (2014), Bayonetta 3 (2022), and Bayonetta Origins: Cereza and the Lost Demon (2023).

== Gameplay ==
Bayonetta gameplay screenshot, demonstrating one of the available "Wicked Weave" attacks

Bayonetta is a single-player, third-person 3D action-adventure and hack and slash game. The player controls a witch named Bayonetta, is able to use melee and long ranged attacks and is able to select multiple weapons. By pressing a combination of buttons, they are able to use "Wicked Weave" attacks and they are also able to use "Torture Attacks" in which Bayonetta summons a variety of devices to deal strong damage to enemies. Such devices range from chainsaws to iron maidens. One ability Bayonetta has is "Witch Time", which activates when the player makes a well-timed dodge to an attack. This temporarily increases her speed, causing enemies to appear to move in slow-motion, allowing Bayonetta to inflict massive amounts of counter damage before the enemies can react.

The player can double jump for extra height, perform evasive backflips, and destroy background objects and doors. Camera views can be rotated, enemy targets can be locked on, and weapons can be switched during play. With unlockable transformations, the player can make Bayonetta become a panther or one of various other living creatures to enhance her abilities. Lollipops can be used to heal her, replenish her magic, induce invincibility or increase her strength, although using these items, as well as dying, lowers the score for that chapter. By finding various component items, the player can combine them into new items. Many enemies and objects drop halos when destroyed, which the player can use to buy items, techniques and weapon upgrades. The player can use enemy weapons, either to directly attack or as props for movement. Bayonetta's strongest attacks allow her to summon parts of Madama Butterfly and other demons with her hair.

During development, five difficulty modes were created: "Very Easy", "Easy", "Normal", "Hard", and "Non-Stop Infinite Climax". On Easy and Very Easy, a "Very Easy Automatic" mode is made available in which the game positions Bayonetta to perform attacks on enemies, and the player only needs to press one button to execute elaborate combos, unless they wish to perform their own choice of movements or attacks. Kamiya posted a video on the game's official website in which character designer Mari Shimazaki demonstrated the mode (which Kamiya "jokingly called 'Mommy Mode'") in Bayonetta. He expected players to first complete the game in 10 to 12 hours, but believed that its rating system (similar to that of Viewtiful Joe, which he directed) and the pursuit of high scores provide replay value. The game has a fixed button configuration; Kamiya said that "there wasn't really a point to changing [it]."

== Story ==
=== Setting and characters ===
Bayonetta takes place in Vigrid, a fictional city in Europe. Bayonetta (voiced by Hellena Taylor / Atsuko Tanaka) is a witch who shapeshifts and uses various firearms, along with magical attacks she performs with her hair by summoning demons to dispatch her foes. She awakens after a 500-year sleep and finds herself in an unfamiliar area with no memories of who or what she is. Over time, she begins to remember what caused her current predicament. Five hundred years before the incident that caused Bayonetta's memory loss, there were two factions preserving the balance between darkness and light in the world: the Umbra Witches, who are followers of darkness, and their counterparts, the Lumen Sages, who are followers of light. The factions shared two distinct treasures, the 'Eyes of the World' (separately named the 'Left Eye of Darkness' and the 'Right Eye of Light') which they used to oversee the just passage of time. Both factions mysteriously disappeared from Vigrid under unknown circumstances. Bayonetta has an ornate piece of jewelry which contains a small red gem, and believes this gem is the Left Eye of the World. While searching for the Right Eye, she occasionally receives flashbacks that make her remember what happened.

Other characters include Luka (ルカ) (voiced by Yuri Lowenthal / Daisuke Namikawa), who met Bayonetta as a child; Bayonetta's rival and fellow Umbra Witch Jeanne (ジャンヌ, Jannu) (voiced by Grey DeLisle / Mie Sonozaki), who wields four guns like Bayonetta; Rodin (ロダン, Rodan) (voiced by Dave Fennoy / Tesshō Genda), the owner of a bar called the Gates Of Hell where Bayonetta can buy various weapons and items; an informant named Enzo (エンツォ, Entso) (voiced by Chick Vennera / Wataru Takagi) who looks and sounds similar to actor Joe Pesci and provides comic relief; a young girl named Cereza (セレッサ, Seressa) (voiced by Joy Jillian / Miyuki Sawashiro) whom Bayonetta meets early in the game; and the main antagonist Balder (バルドル, Barudoru) (voiced by Grant Albrecht / Norio Wakamoto).

The game settings borrow from Dante's Divine Comedy: Paradiso (heaven), which generally takes the form of a heavenly yellow or golden valley or palace and is the home of the "Angel" enemies she faces; Purgatorio (purgatory), a metarealm that functions as an "in between" for metaphysical beings and stands alongside yet outside of the plane humans exist on (all beings in and outside of Purgatorio take on a transparent, watery appearance); Inferno (hell), which is not visited in the game, but contains the infernal demons that Bayonetta summons in combat, using her hair as a conduit.

=== Plot ===
Bayonetta, a witch who was awakened twenty years ago from the bottom of a lake, has no memories of her past. Owning one-half of a pair jewels known as the "Eyes of the World," Bayonetta leaves for Vigrid when the informant Enzo informs her of rumors that the other half, the 'Right Eye' is there. She is capable of traversing between Paradiso and Chaos, the realms of angels and humans respectively, but not able to enter Inferno, the realm of demons. While at Vigrid, she encounters various angels from Paradiso who attempt but fail to kill her.

Bayonetta confronts another Umbra Witch named Jeanne, who seemingly has ties to Bayonetta's past, and a young man named Luka, who blames Bayonetta for his father's death when he discovered her. Eventually, Bayonetta discovers that Jeanne is associated with the angels somehow, and fights her again. Afterwards, she meets a lost child named Cereza, who believes Bayonetta to be her mother and starts following her. Returning to the human world, Bayonetta continues her search for the Right Eye, journeying to an island named Isla del Sol with Luka and Cereza, while gradually remembering her past and uncovering the answers to her questions: she and Jeanne are the only survivors of the Umbra Witches, which was rendered near extinction after a clan war with the Lumen Sage clan, followed a massive witch hunt led by the angels of Paradiso. She also discovered that both halves of the Eyes of the World are artifacts created by Aesir (also known as The Overseer), the God of the human realm who decided to grant humans free will out of pity, by bestowing the eyes (which contain his power) separately to both Lumen Sages and Umbra Witches. Additionally, Paradiso, Chaos and Inferno were originally a single realm before it was split during an event called First Armageddon.

Bayonetta is confronted again by Jeanne, who explains Bayonetta was a child born from an Umbra Witch and a Lumen Sage, a forbidden union. Bayonetta defeats Jeanne, who reveals the reason Bayonetta possesses the Left Eye is because she has accepted her fate. Bayonetta hands Jeanne the gem she had been carrying, making her remember she is Cereza, and that Jeanne was once her friend; it was Jeanne who sealed her away during the Witch Hunt, giving Bayonetta the gem to protect her and the Left Eye. After Jeanne seemingly sacrifices herself to save Bayonetta, the latter continues through the tower with Luka and Cereza.

At the top, Bayonetta meets Balder, the last of the Lumen Sages. Balder reveals he is Bayonetta's father, and plans to reunite the three realms by resurrecting Jubileus the Creator, the ruler of Paradiso. He also reveals that Bayonetta herself is the Left Eye, but for her to awaken it, she had to regain her memories. For that reason, he brought Cereza, who is Bayonetta as a child, from the past, to awaken her memories. Confronted by Luka, he throws him to his death, revealing he was the one behind the death of Luka's father, and further reveals that he had mind-controlled Jeanne to do his bidding. Bayonetta fights and seemingly kills Balder, and saves Luka.

After returning Cereza to the past, leaving behind her watch and some parting words, Bayonetta returns to the present. However, her actions have caused her to alter the events leading to her sealing 500 years ago, changing the past and awakening the Left Eye, causing her to collapse from the overwhelming power. Balder, who had survived the fight, transports himself and the unconscious Bayonetta towards the statue on top of the tower, beginning the resurrection of Jubileus. As the statue launches into space, Jeanne, who had survived, reappears, free from Balder's control. She ascends the launching statue on her motorcycle; reaching Bayonetta, she saves her, but Jubileus comes alive, consuming Balder. Bayonetta defeats Jubileus by summoning Queen Sheba, who punches the deity's soul into the sun. As Jubileus' physical body plummets towards Earth, Jeanne and Bayonetta destroy it.

The epilogue, mirroring the start of the game, shows Jeanne and Bayonetta continuing to battle against the angels.

== Development ==
... it's been eight years since [the first DMC], so of course I wouldn't create a game that hadn't progressed from those days! Of course, if there hadn't have been DMC, there wouldn't be Bayonetta, which has evolved from DMC.

— Hideki Kamiya, April 2009

Hideki Kamiya directed development of Bayonetta at PlatinumGames since January 2007, and the game was "more-or-less complete" by October 21, 2009. The group developed for Microsoft's Xbox 360 game console, while Sega - with PlatinumGames' support - handed the task of porting the game to Sony's PlayStation 3 to Nex Entertainment. Kamiya had worked on previous games such as Devil May Cry, Viewtiful Joe, Resident Evil and its sequel, and as such, the game makes occasional references to these games, as well as other Clover Studio games and various Sega franchises, such as a minigame inspired by Space Harrier. Though he "deliberately created Bayonetta from scratch" and has called its story "completely original", Kamiya has admitted using "some names from Scandinavian mythology" and playing "about half of" Devil May Cry 4 for research.

Mari Shimazaki designed the game's characters to be "fashionable", with "subdued" features. She designed Bayonetta to fulfill Kamiya's request for a "modern witch that wears glasses and wields four guns", and the two settled on her original concept for the character despite having spent "over a year" on other concepts. Bayonetta emerged as a long-haired, black-clothed witch with a beehive hairdo (a modern representation of the traditional pointy hat) and glasses (which Kamiya pushed for, to "differentiate Bayonetta from other female characters" and to "give her a sense of mystery and intelligence"). Conversely, Shimazaki "didn't require a huge amount of effort" to design Bayonetta's short-haired, red-clothed rival Jeanne, who merely wears her glasses on her head above her eyes. She added plumes to Jeanne's handguns to add movement to the design, and thick makeup to Jeanne's face to "make [her] feel like something out of the 1960s". Though Shimazaki preferred Bayonetta, Jeanne turned out to be the more popular of the two witches among Kamiya and the development team.

As a fan of folk music, Kamiya named Bayonetta's set of four handguns after the old English ballad "Scarborough Fair", and its individual guns Parsley, Sage, Rosemary and Thyme. Hiroshi Yamaguchi focused on composing music for the game that had a "nice up-tempo beat" and expressed femininity through female choirs, pianos, and other "'beautiful' instruments"—though some tracks also use pure orchestra or folk instruments.

Kenichiro Yoshimura transformed Shimazaki's Bayonetta design into a game model and used the digital sculpting tool ZBrush to create normal maps for its details. He worked with Shimazaki on the model's makeup, referred to foreign models with similar bodies, and said that he "really wanted to get Bayonetta's backside perfect" because he was into "that sort of thing...". The language spoken by the Angels and for all Infernal Summons is Enochian, a divine language described by John Dee and his colleague Edward Kelley.

To Kamiya, the core theme of the game and its protagonist's attacks is "sexiness". To fit the theme of "her femininity and sexuality", the developers made Bayonetta bleed rose petals instead of blood when hit, and used butterfly imagery as part of her moves and outfit. Her giant boot, fist, and monster attacks reveal some of her body — her hair is magically formed into clothes but must be stripped from her body to form these attacks - and when the player targets an enemy, red lips mark the enemy's chest; this led IGN to call the developing game a mix of "action and a great big helping of fan service".

== Promotion ==
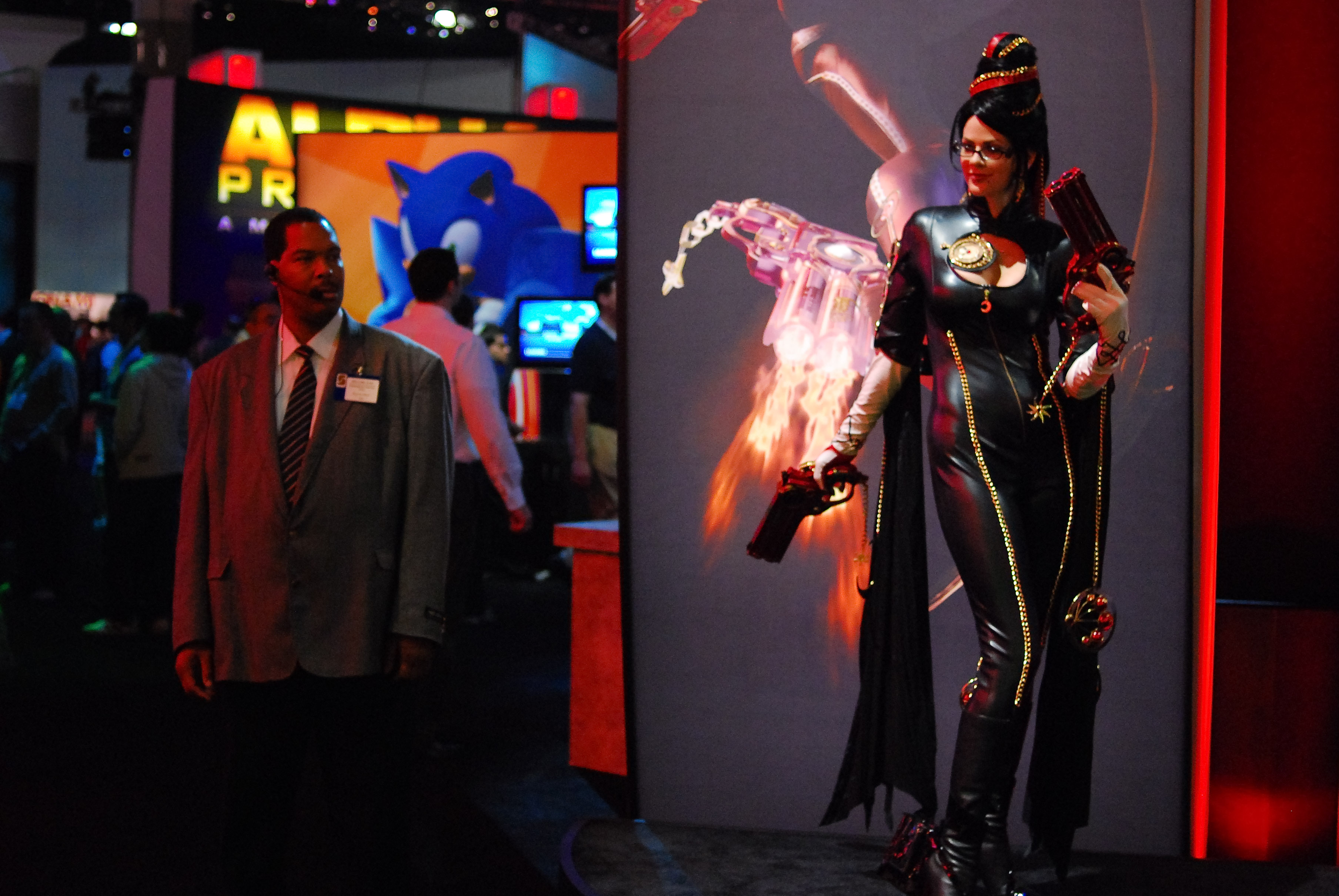
Penny Drake dressed as the character at E3 2009

At the 2009 Electronic Entertainment Expo (E3), Sega chose Penny Drake to model as Bayonetta after auditioning 100 women. The company then joined men's lifestyle website Maxim.com to run a contest to find women who looked like Bayonetta. The grand prize winner, Andrea Bonaccorso, announced on November 23, 2009, received an Xbox 360, a 50-inch plasma television, and a copy of the 360 version. Sega hired Japanese pop singer MiChi to perform "Something Missing", written for a Bayonetta commercial. The commercial, which has since been shown on the official Japanese website, touts the game as "∞(non-stop) climax action (∞(ノンストップ)クライマックス・アクション)" and features a model dressed as Bayonetta with a lollipop. In the U.S. and the UK, commercials have featured La Roux's "In for the Kill".

== Release and merchandise ==
Demos of Bayonetta were released on PlayStation Network and Xbox Live in Japan on October 8, 2009, and internationally on December 3, 2009. The game was released on October 29, 2009, in Japan, and was later released in other regions in 2010: January 5 in North America, January 7 in Australia, and January 8 in Europe. An update for the PlayStation 3 version was released on January 28, allowing players to install the game on their hard drive, dramatically reducing load times.

A 150-song, five-CD soundtrack was scheduled for a November 4 release. Another soundtrack CD, Rodin's Selection, was created for inclusion with pre-ordered copies of the game. It comes packaged in a brown jacket styled as a menu from Rodin's bar "The Gates of Hell". Sega of Europe released a ∞(Non-Stop) Climax Edition in the UK, France, Spain, and Australia, which included the game, the Rodin's Selection tracks packaged in a black-and-red jacket, and an artbook. Pre-orders in Australia and "most European territories" included a replica of one of Bayonetta's "Scarborough Fair" guns.

Bayonetta: Witch of Vigrid, a book with pictures of Bayonetta and an "interview" with her, was released in Japan on October 22, 2009. By then, a Bayonetta theme had been made available for the Google Chrome browser. A song, "Reaping Beauty", by MC Lars and featuring Beefy, Random, Tina Root of Small Halo and SMP was included on the second re-release of Lars' album 21 Concepts (But a Hit Ain't One). The song is inspired by Bayonetta, and references the Bayonetta and many of the aesthetic and gameplay elements.

On April Fools' Day 2017, Sega released 8-bit Bayonetta, also known as Angel Land, for free on Windows, which was also available on the PlatinumGames' 404 page in 2015. While the game uses 8-bit era graphics and was simplified in gameplay, only allowing Bayonetta to jump and fire at a few enemies and considered part of the April Fools' Day pranks, players found several bits of pieces in the achievements that pointed to a countdown timer on Sega's website ending on April 11, 2017, as well as other data mining suggesting a possible port of the Bayonetta game to Windows. At the end of the timer, it was confirmed that Bayonetta was coming to Windows, supporting 4K graphics and other improvements from the original versions. A spokesperson for PlatinumGames said that they have become interested in porting more of their games to Windows, though the decision to do so has been a choice of their respective publishers; Sega has been supportive of personal computer releases as of late. PlatinumGames's development efforts to port the game to the Wii U aided in the completion of the Windows port.

For Bayonetta's tenth anniversary, Sega announced the Bayonetta & Vanquish 10th Anniversary Bundle for the PlayStation 4 and Xbox One. The retail release comes in a steelbook and includes Bayonetta alongside Vanquish, another PlatinumGames game, on a single disc, with support for 4K 60fps visuals for PlayStation 4 Pro and Xbox One X users. Both games can also be purchased digitally either individually or collectively at a discount price. The compilation was released on February 18, 2020.

=== Soundtrack ===
The Bayonetta Original Soundtrack was released in Japan on November 4, 2009. The album contains five discs with 150 tracks used in the game, composed by Hiroshi Yamaguchi, Masami Ueda, Rei Kondoh, Takayasu Sodeoka, Norihiko Hibino, Takahiro Izutani, Yoshitaka Suzuki, Erina Niwa, and Naoto Tanaka. It was also released on the North American iTunes Store on the same day, spanning five Volumes in total. The North American release of the soundtrack does not include any version of "Fly Me To The Moon". Helena Noguerra provided the main vocals for the theme of Bayonetta.

=== Bayonetta: Bloody Fate ===
An anime film, Bayonetta: Bloody Fate (ベヨネッタ ブラッディフェイト, Beyonetta Buraddi Feito), was directed by Fuminori Kizaki and produced by Gonzo, with screenplay by Mitsutaka Hirota and character designs by Ai Yokoyama. The film was announced at Tokyo Game Show 2013 and released in ten Japanese theaters for two weeks on November 23, 2013. It was released on Blu-ray Disc and DVD in Japan on January 24, 2014. A manga adaptation illustrated by Mizuki Sakakibara was published in two parts in Kodansha's Bessatsu Shōnen Magazine on November 9, 2013, and December 9, 2013, respectively.

== Reception ==
Reception

Aggregate score
Aggregator	Score
Metacritic	PS3: 87/100; X360: 90/100; WIIU: 86/100; PC: 90/100; NS: 84/100; PS4: 81/100

Review scores
Publication	Score
1Up.com	X360: A PS3: A−
Eurogamer	9/10
Famitsu	X360: 40/40; PS3: 38/40
G4	4/5
Game Informer	9/10
GamePro	4.5/5
GamesRadar+	5/5
IGN	X360: 9.6/10; PS3: 8.2/10

Awards
Publication	Award
IGN UK	Game of the Year
GameSpot	Best Boss Fights and Best Original IP
GameTrailers	Best New IP
Giant Bomb	Best Debut

=== Critical reception ===
Critics generally lauded the graphical presentation and Bayonetta. Cam Shea of IGN Australia said in March 2009 that Bayonetta looked "stunning", and called Bayonetta their "new favourite video game character ever". They compared her to Devil May Cry's protagonist Dante, with his "playfulness and versatility", but with "some of the most visually inventive combat" they've seen. Similarly, GameSpy's Gerald Villoria praised the game in July that year as highly original to the point that it could end up like the poor-selling Ōkami (another Kamiya-directed game) because "the premise, the characters, the action sequences" were different from anything he had ever played, and called its lead a "constantly moving", "remarkably multi-faceted" character "presented in an ultra-stylish way".

The PS3 and Xbox 360 versions in general were also commented on. A few days before Bayonetta's release, Japanese gaming publication Famitsu awarded the Xbox 360 version a perfect 40 out of 40. The PlayStation 3 version received a slightly lower rating, criticized for its lesser visual quality, frame rate and control problems compared to the Xbox 360 version. At the 2009 Tokyo Game Show, Daniel Feit of Wired News played both versions and felt that while the 360 version was "a little brighter and more colorful", the PS3 version's cutscenes resembled "watching a movie through a sepia filter". GameSpot's video review lamented duller graphics and inconsistent frame rates for its PS3 port. 1UP's staff again played a PS3 version for 15 minutes on the weekend of August 31 that year, at PlatinumGames' "Feel Bayonetta" event. They said that it "was very blurry" compared to a 360 version displayed there, and that its frame rate "was all over the place", and as a result, it was "often hard to keep track of the action [in one scene]". Ryan Clements of IGN said that while the PS3 version was "still a fun game", it had "a lot of problems", mainly being "the excessive slowdown and loading".

The gameplay received general praise from critics. Matt Leone of 1UP.com said of the pre-release version of the game's PS3 port that when he discovered he could "hold down the final button in the string to continuously fire gunshots" he observed that it looked "incredibly cool when you kick someone and then keep your leg pointed at their face". Edge awarded the game a score of 10 out of 10, praising the game's combat system for both having depth and being able to be learnt easily. Edge singled out the upgrade from Normal to Hard difficulties as the point where the game transitions from "the great to the legendary", concluding that it was "difficult to recall another third-person actioner" that felt "so worth mastering". GamesRadar's Nathan Irvine also said that the game nailed "the epic scale of everything" that unfolded in front of the player and "manner in which it's delivered", believed it was better than God of War Collection, Devil May Cry 4, and Ninja Gaiden Sigma 2, and praised its "superb action" and humor. However, he said the only time its plot made sense was "right at the end", and complained about some of the game's "insanely frustrating" Quick Time Events (QTEs). Staff at GameSpot UK labelled the "Witch Time" mechanic a "cool move" and one of the two boss battles they fought were "pretty intense", and said that it was "easy to see the similarities" between the game and Devil May Cry. They also opined that "rampant violence and sexism" was common in the game. One comment in regards to the third person perspective was from IGN UK's Martin Robinson, who said that it was not "Devil May Cry, Ninja Gaiden or God of War" that served as the game's best point of reference but rather "Super Mario Galaxy" - he commented on how Bayonetta, like Galaxy, "loves to tinker with the player's sense of perspective". Daniel Feit found the game's commands easy to learn and perform, but criticized the camera for focusing "on her and the wall" instead of "the enemies cornering her" and felt that some of her "Wicked Weave" attacks could "also obscure the action". Clements labelled its voice work "a bit campy but still extremely enjoyable", but said the game's plot was "all over the place" and was not as well told as "game stories like Mass Effect and Uncharted". However, Gamearena felt that the gameplay would not appeal to many, commenting that Devil May Cry was seen by many to be "too campy and over-the-top" and Bayonetta made it look "monochrome".

The game in general was praised by Eurogamer, who commented that the game exemplified "so much of what commentators claim has died in the Japanese game industry" and said that Bayonetta was a "blast of creative brilliance, both technically accomplished, strategically deep and infused with rare imagination". But the Associated Press review opined that the game "would have blown [them] away 15 years ago" and felt that Bayonetta did not give the player "anything to do except fight".

Daan Koopman at Nintendo World Report, reviewing the Wii U version, rated the game an 8/10, stating that Bayonetta was "still a glorious action game" and that "time has not really changed that one bit". He also praised the addition of the Nintendo-themed costumes, for their humor and functions.

IGN UK announced that Bayonetta was their pick for the 2010 Game of the Year (GOTY).

The game was nominated for the Freedom Tower Award for Best Remake as part of the Bayonetta 1 and Bayonetta 2 Collection at the New York Game Awards.

Bayonetta was one of twelve games to receive a 2009 Japan Game Awards "Future Division" award at the 2009 Tokyo Game Show.

=== Sales figures ===
Sinobi, a Japanese blog known for its early sales data, reported that Bayonetta sold 138,000 copies—93,000 for the PS3 and 45,000 for the 360—on its day of release in the country. Media Create reported the PS3 version sold 135,242 copies and was the top-selling game during its week of release there, while the 360 version sold 64,325 copies and charted at number seven. Phil Elliott of GamesIndustry.biz called the 360 version's lower sales figures "a very strong performance for the Microsoft platform, relative to installed base". The two releases fell to number eight and number 15 respectively the following week. By March 31, 2010, Bayonetta sold 1.35 million units worldwide. In a 2013 interview with Polygon, PlatinumGames' president Tatsuya Minami said Bayonetta was their best-selling game but that the sales did not meet their expectations. By the time of its Wii U port, the game had sold over 2 million units across Xbox 360 and PS3.

About a month after its release on Windows, Sega Europe's Vice President of Publishing John Clark said that the Windows version had sold more than 170,000 units, and that Sega was "really happy" about this performance.

The Nintendo Switch version of the game sold 1.24 million copies as of December 2022.

== Sequels ==
A sequel, Bayonetta 2, was announced in September 2012 as a Wii U game to be published by Nintendo. The game, released in Japan in September 2014 and in North America and Europe in December 2014, features a port of the original Bayonetta, which adds costumes based on Nintendo properties including Super Mario, The Legend of Zelda, Star Fox and Metroid, as well as touch screen controls and dual audio tracks.

Another sequel, Bayonetta 3, was announced during the Game Awards 2017 in December as a Nintendo Switch game, alongside the announcement of Switch ports for the previous two games, although physical versions of the first game weren't localized until 2022. A prequel to Bayonetta, titled Bayonetta Origins: Cereza and the Lost Demon was also announced at the Game Awards 2022.
