= Bayonetta 2 =

2014 video game

- Developer: PlatinumGames
- Publisher: Nintendo
- Director: Yusuke Hashimoto
- Producers: Atsushi Inaba; Akiko Kuroda; Hitoshi Yamagami
- Designers: Hirono Sato; Junichi Oka; Akiteru Naka
- Programmer: Minota Kenshin
- Artists: Mari Shimazaki; Yusuke Hashimoto
- Writers: Hideki Kamiya; Bingo Morihashi
- Composers: Masami Ueda; Hiroshi Yamaguchi; Rei Kondoh; Naofumi Harada; Satoshi Igarashi; Hitomi Kurokawa; Naoto Tanaka; Takayasu Sodeoka
- Series: Bayonetta
- Platforms: Wii U; Nintendo Switch
- Release: Wii U: JP: September 20, 2014; NA/EU: October 24, 2014; AU: October 25, 2014; Nintendo Switch: WW: February 16, 2018; JP: February 17, 2018
- Genre: Action-adventure
- Modes: Single-player, multiplayer

Bayonetta 2 (Note: Japanese: ベヨネッタ2, Hepburn: Beyonetta Tsū) is a 2014 action-adventure game developed by PlatinumGames and published by Nintendo for the Wii U. It is the sequel to the 2009 game Bayonetta, and was directed by Yusuke Hashimoto and produced by Atsushi Inaba, Akiko Kuroda, and Hitoshi Yamagami, under supervision by series creator Hideki Kamiya.

Bayonetta 2 was announced in a Nintendo Direct presentation on September 13, 2012. Unlike the Sega-published Bayonetta, which was a multiplatform release for Xbox 360 and PlayStation 3, a publishing deal with Nintendo meant that Bayonetta 2 released as a platform-exclusive for the Wii U. The titular character, Bayonetta, sports a new costume and hairstyle and the game features a new two-player mode. The game is the second Bayonetta product to receive Japanese voiceovers, using the same cast that voiced the Bayonetta: Bloody Fate anime film by Gonzo. Bayonetta 2 was released in September 2014 in Japan and October 2014 for the rest of the world. The Special and First Print Editions also included a Wii U port of the original Bayonetta game.

Bayonetta 2 received widespread critical acclaim, with praise for its combat system, visuals, and overall improvements from the first game. A Nintendo Switch version was released in February 2018. A sequel, Bayonetta 3, was released on October 28, 2022.

== Gameplay ==
In-game screenshot from the opening of Bayonetta 2

Bayonetta 2 carries on the action-style gameplay of its predecessor, in which players control the eponymous Bayonetta as she fights against various angelic and demonic forces using combinations of melee attacks and gunplay. Dodging enemy attacks at the last second activates 'Witch Time', slowing down enemies around Bayonetta and allowing players to easily retaliate and solve certain environmental puzzles. Players are also able to use special moves called Torture Attacks, trapping opponents in infernal devices for extra points. Weapon customization from the first game also returns, allowing players to equip combinations of new weapons on both Bayonetta's hands and feet. A large array of weapons can be equipped, including the character's signature guns, a bow, swords and other forms of projectile weapons. Players earn grades during combat, with the highest 'Pure Platinum' grade achieved by performing high numbers of combos, in the fastest time possible, without being damaged. As with the previous game, Bayonetta can use Torture Attacks on her enemies, conjured torture devices that finish off single enemies in gruesome ways and grant a bonus to the player.

Bayonetta 2 adds a new gameplay element called Umbran Climax which can be activated when the player has a full magic gauge. Similar to the state of boss fights in the first game, this technique strengthens Bayonetta's attacks and combos with extra Wicked Weaves and Infernal Demon summons for a short period of time. This increases their overall range and damage and replenishes Bayonetta's health when in use.

== Story ==
=== Setting and characters ===
Most of Bayonetta 2 takes place on the fictional sacred mountain of Fimbulventr and the nearby town of Noatun, both located in the Middle East. The main character Bayonetta (Hellena Taylor / Atsuko Tanaka) travels to the mountain to find the Gates of Hell to save her friend Jeanne (Grey DeLisle-Griffin / Mie Sonozaki).

Returning characters include Rodin (Dave Fennoy / Tesshō Genda), the bartender of Gates of Hell who supplies Bayonetta with powerful weapons; Luka (Yuri Lowenthal / Daisuke Namikawa), a journalist who provides Bayonetta with valuable information; and Enzo (John Kassir / Wataru Takagi), an informant who provides comic relief. New characters include Loki (Mark Daugherty / Junko Minagawa), an amnesiac boy who guides Bayonetta to the mountain; the Masked Lumen (Crispin Freeman / Takehito Koyasu), a powerful Sage and Bayonetta's new rival; and Loptr (TJ Ramini / Takumi Yamazaki), a mysterious Prophet apparently allied with the Masked Lumen.

=== Plot ===
A few months after the first Bayonetta, Bayonetta is shopping on Christmas Eve with Enzo when angels suddenly attack New York City. Teaming up with fellow witch and friend Jeanne, she is on the verge of winning until a demon summoning goes wrong. Jeanne saves Bayonetta from the familiar's attack, but the attack causes Inferno to claim her soul. Bayonetta destroys the demon and resolves to save Jeanne. At the same time, a masked Lumen Sage is brought to the present by a mysterious figure, known as the Prophet, who promises him the chance for revenge.

Upon a tip from her informant Enzo, Bayonetta heads to the mountain of Fimbulventr, in the city of Noatun, which houses an entrance to Inferno. In Noatun, she meets a boy called Loki, who is trying to reach Fimbulventr for reasons he cannot remember. The two strike a deal to travel together as Loki claims his powers will be needed in order to reach Inferno. On the way, they learn about some of Loki's lost memories, but are constantly attacked by angels and demons. Loki is hunted by the Lumen Sage and the Prophet, who knows Loki. There, they encounter Luka, Bayonetta's acquaintance and news journalist. Luka explains to them the Legend of Aesir: Aesir was once the ruler of the Chaos realm, and had created the Left Eye of Darkness and Right Eye of Light (also known as Eyes of the World) for humanity to grant them free will. The Lumen Sages and the Umbra Witches were entrusted with one Eye each for ownership and safekeeping. Due to the death of the allegedly last Lumen Sage, Father Balder by Bayonetta and Jeanne, the Right Eye of Light had disappeared, which prompted Luka to investigate the consequences to the planet, and if it is connected to the natural disasters that has been occurring. Meanwhile, the Prophet shows Bayonetta a vision that implies the Witch Hunts 500 years ago were not caused by Balder.

Bayonetta reaches Inferno and travels into its depths to save Jeanne. With the help of Rodin, Bayonetta is able to save Jeanne's soul and revive her. However, the Sage attacks Loki again and reveals himself to be a young Balder. Bayonetta saves Loki from him, but Loki loses control of his powers and sends Bayonetta and Balder back 500 years into the past. Now in Vigrid during the Witch Hunts, Bayonetta meets her mother Rosa, and the two work together to fight back against the angels. When they become separated, Bayonetta encounters Loptr, a doppelgänger of Loki who is the Prophet in the present. Loptr claims that the Eyes of the World, one of which Bayonetta possesses, belong to him. Later meeting with the young Balder, Bayonetta arrives too late to stop Loptr from murdering Rosa. Bayonetta realizes that Loptr has tricked Balder into seeking revenge on Loki in the present. The two of them decide to work together and return to the present to stop Loptr. Meanwhile, in the present, Luka encounters Loki, who claims to remember everything, and asks Luka to take him to Fimbulventr.

With Jeanne's help, Bayonetta and Balder reach the top of Fimbulventr and find Loptr who has already captured Loki. Loptr explains that he and Loki were once the God of Chaos, Aesir, the creator of the Eyes of the World. Aesir had split his power amongst humanity to create the Eyes but had also split his soul into two halves of good and evil in the process. Loki, the good half, was given the power to control the Eyes directly, which Loptr steals. Despite their efforts, Loptr takes both of the Eyes from Balder and Bayonetta and transforms into Aesir with the intent to rule humanity. Loki claims that Aesir's power can erase anything from existence, and uses that power to destroy the Eyes, weakening Loptr and allowing Bayonetta and Balder to destroy his body with Jeanne's help. Loptr's soul attempts to escape to a time where the Eyes still exist to try his plan again. Balder stops him and absorbs his soul, despite Loki warning him that doing so will corrupt him. Balder reveals he knows that Bayonetta is his daughter and asks her to stop him should he be corrupted, and is returned to his time. With Loptr and the Eyes gone, Loki says he plans to take a break from the world's affairs, but that he may meet Bayonetta again, and fades away.

Some days later, Bayonetta and Jeanne are shopping again. Suddenly, another attack begins, and Bayonetta teams up with Jeanne to battle them again.

In a post-credits scene, Balder is shown returning to his time period, now corrupted, setting up the events of the first Bayonetta.

== Development ==
Shortly after the release of Bayonetta, Hideki Kamiya discussed with Yusuke Hashimoto ideas for sequels and spin-off games from the title. Despite these discussions, Kamiya believed they would never release a sequel. However, Kamiya's Twitter account later stated that he might release the sequel if Bayonetta sold well. Bayonetta 2 was revealed during a Nintendo Direct on September 13, 2012. The reason for the game's Wii U exclusivity was because Nintendo stepped in with additional funding after it was shelved by Sega. PlatinumGames producer Atsushi Inaba, responding to complaints by fans of the original game, stated that Bayonetta 2 would not exist if Nintendo had not partnered with the developer to make the game. Sega remained as the game's consultant. Work on Bayonetta 2 was based on feedback the staff received from the original Bayonetta to bring various improvements. Nintendo was not involved in the making of the game other than as an "observer" and the staff were pleased with their experience. One of the improvements made by staff was to the movements of enemies: in the first game, there was a single enemy movement when Bayonetta struck them, while in Bayonetta 2, they have differing animations depending on the direction of Bayonetta's attack. The architecture for the main city environment, Noatun, was based on cities in Belgium and Italy, such as Bruges (church interiors), Brussels (the grand buildings), Florence (city streets and houses) and Venice (the canal network).

In a Nintendo Direct from January 2013, PlatinumGames showed a development trailer for the game. They confirmed game development was going smoothly, but did not go into many gameplay details. A playable demo of the game was featured at Nintendo's booth during E3 2013, following the reveal of the game's first gameplay trailer. A multiplayer mode was also announced, along with the option of a touch-based control scheme and the confirmation that the game will support Off-TV Play. In the Nintendo Direct from February 2014, another trailer for the game was released, showing off the new environments players can expect as well as some of the basic story elements of the game. Further gameplay was also released, revealing the use of Japanese voice actors for the Japanese release, new weapons for Bayonetta to use as well as the use of the new youth character as being playable. As of the Bayonetta 2 Direct, the game was released on September 20, 2014, in Japan and in October 2014 for the rest of the world. At E3 2014, it was announced the game would include a port of the original Bayonetta, which would include exclusive Nintendo costumes, dual audio voice tracks, and touch controls. The original game would be a digital download via the Nintendo eShop and on a separate disc for retailers. To market the release, Nintendo partnered with Playboy to set a photo shoot with Playmate Pamela Horton cosplaying Bayonetta.

=== Music ===
The music of Bayonetta 2 was composed by a group of members led by Masami Ueda, many of whom returned after being featured on the soundtrack for the first game. Ueda states that he finds the score for Bayonetta 2 much livelier than the one for Bayonetta and explains they attempted to create new elements in the music by switching out certain instruments for others.

A key difference in the soundtrack between the games is the inclusion of dynamic music for boss fights based on the progression in Bayonetta 2. Ueda states that the music is broken up into phases and are set off by triggers based on animations and other cues in the scene which allow for swells in the music to match up the action onscreen. A similar approach was done for the stage tracks as well, with as many as 10 shorter loops mixed together that transition based on the player's progress through the stage. Compared to the original Bayonetta's 150 tracks, Bayonetta 2 has 183 tracks with higher audio quality.

Like the original game, Bayonetta 2 features a cover of an old song but remixed into the signature style of the games, "Moon River" by Andy Williams. Both the remixed version and the original are included in the game, much like how "Fly Me To The Moon" was used as the main theme song for Bayonetta. The game's battle theme, "Tomorrow is Mine", was one of the first pieces of music revealed in its entirety during promotion of the game. Both of these songs were performed by Keeley Bumford. Also like the original game, Bayonetta 2 received a five-disc original soundtrack, which was released in Japan on October 29, 2014.

== Reception ==
Bayonetta 2

Aggregate score
Aggregator	Score	
Aggregator	NS	Wii U
Metacritic	92/100	91/100

Review scores
Publication	Score	
Publication	NS	Wii U
4Players	86/100	88/100
AllGame	N/A	4.5/5
Destructoid	N/A	10/10
Edge	N/A	10/10
Electronic Gaming Monthly	N/A	9.5/10
Eurogamer	N/A	Recommended (9/10)
Famitsu	N/A	10/10, 9/10, 10/10, 9/10
Game Informer	N/A	9/10
GameRevolution	N/A	3.5/5
GameSpot	10/10	10/10
GamesRadar+	N/A	4/5
GamesTM	N/A	9/10
GameTrailers	N/A	9.8/10
Giant Bomb	N/A	5/5
Hyper	N/A	100/100
IGN	N/A	9.5/10
Joystiq	N/A	5/5
Nintendo Life	9/10	9/10
Nintendo World Report	10/10	9/10
Official Nintendo Magazine	N/A	93%
Pocket Gamer	4.5/5	N/A
Polygon	N/A	7.5/10
Shacknews	N/A	8/10
The Guardian	N/A	5/5
USgamer	N/A	4.5/5
VideoGamer.com	N/A	9/10

Bayonetta 2 received critical acclaim. It received an aggregated score of 91/100 on Metacritic based on 80 reviews. The Japanese magazine Famitsu's four reviewers collectively awarded the game a score of 38 out of 40. Edge awarded Bayonetta 2 a score of 10 out of 10. The magazine's reviewer described it as "a riotous, spectacular work of the highest order of camp" and praised the game for the extent of its customisability and for refining problematic elements from the first Bayonetta, with tighter pacing and the removal of "sudden, mid-cinematic, instafail QTEs". The reviewer concluded, "This is a game that you can complete in ten hours, but play and replay forever. … It is a masterclass in combat design, in videogame variety, in the balance between accessibility and depth." GameSpot reviewer Mark Walton said the game "will be remembered as an absolute classic" and awarded it a perfect 10/10, the seventh game in the site's history to receive that score. Chris Carter from Destructoid also rated it a 10/10, where he declared it as "one of the finest action games of all time", alongside Devil May Cry 3.

Several reviews agreed that the game was an improvement on its predecessor, despite acknowledgement that its combat mechanics were largely unchanged: Eurogamer's Martin Robinson concluded, "Bayonetta 2's biggest disappointment may be that it's an iterative sequel, but it's not such a problem when it's iterating on genius." IGN's Jose Otero commented that its art direction and pacing "make Bayonetta 1 look poor by comparison," while GameTrailers called it "sharpened to a nearly flawless degree" compared to its predecessor, praising the variety in addition to the style mixed with the gameplay, where the game "thrives on throwing players into complete madness and letting them conquer it." Chris Carter at Destructoid stated "Four years later and Platinum hasn't lost its edge with Bayonetta 2. It's just as stylish and as fun as ever"

Of the game's new features, the co-operative online Tag Climax mode was welcomed by GameSpot's Mark Walton and by Eurogamer's Martin Robinson, who praised it for requiring the player to gain a deep understanding of the combo scoring system; however, IGN's Otero commented that the fun it provides was restricted to short bursts, and Polygon's Arthur Gies found the mode's co-operative mechanics at odds with its competitive focus on scoring. Otero and Robinson both criticized the game's optional touchscreen-based control system, intended to improve accessibility for new players, as very limited in comparison to the game's main control scheme.

=== Sales ===
In Japan, Bayonetta 2 sold approximately 39,000 units in its first week of release, much fewer than were sold of the original Bayonetta in its debut week. After its third week of release, Bayonetta 2 had sold approximately 50,000 units in Japan. The title was the seventh best-selling game in the UK in its first week of release, but was absent from the Top 40 best-seller list in its second week.

The Nintendo Switch version of Bayonetta 2 sold 9,532 copies within its first week on sale in Japan, which placed it at number 14 on the all format sales chart. By March 2018, Nintendo confirmed the Switch version had sold 400,000 copies during its first nine weeks, compared to the 300,000 copies the Wii U version sold during the same period. By December 31, 2021, the Switch version of the game had sold 1.04 million copies worldwide. As of December 31, 2022, the Switch version sold 1.23 million copies.

=== Awards ===
List of pre-release awards and nominations
Year	Awards	Category	Result	Ref.
2014	Destructoid's Best of E3 2014	Best Action/Adventure	Nominated	
2014	Destructoid's Best of E3 2014	Best Nintendo Exclusive	Nominated	
2014	IGN's Best of E3 2014	Best Action Game	Nominated	
2014	IGN's Best of E3 2014	Best Wii U Game	Nominated	
2014	Joystiq	E3 Selection	Won	

List of post-release awards and nominations
Year	Awards	Category	Result	Ref.
2014	Destructoid's Best of 2014	Best Overall Game	Won	
2014	Edge's Edge Awards 2014	Top Game of 2014	Won	
2014	The Game Awards 2014	Game of the Year	Nominated	
2014	The Game Awards 2014	Best Action/Adventure	Nominated	
2014	GameSpot's Game of the Year	Overall Game of the Year	Nominated	
2014	GameSpot's Game of the Year	Wii U Game of the Year	Nominated	
2014	GameTrailers's Best of 2014	Best Action/Adventure	Won	
2014	GameTrailers's Best of 2014	Best Wii U Exclusive	Won	
2014	Giant Bomb's 2014 Game of the Year Awards	Best Game	Nominated	
2014	Nintendo Life's Reader Awards 2014	Overall Game of the Year	Nominated	
2014	Nintendo Life's Reader Awards 2014	Wii U Retail Game of the Year	Nominated	
2014	Nintendo Life's Staff Awards 2014	Overall Game of the Year	Nominated	
2014	Nintendo Life's Staff Awards 2014	Wii U Retail Game of the Year	Nominated	
2014	National Academy of Video Game Trade Reviewers (NAVGTR) awards	Original Light Mix Score, Franchise	Won	
2014	National Academy of Video Game Trade Reviewers (NAVGTR) awards	Game, Franchise Action	Nominated	
2014	National Academy of Video Game Trade Reviewers (NAVGTR) awards	Costume Design	Nominated	
2014	National Academy of Video Game Trade Reviewers (NAVGTR) awards	Control Precision	Nominated	
2014	National Academy of Video Game Trade Reviewers (NAVGTR) awards	Control Design, 3D	Nominated	
2014	National Academy of Video Game Trade Reviewers (NAVGTR) awards	Character Design	Won	
2014	National Academy of Video Game Trade Reviewers (NAVGTR) awards	Animation, Technical	Nominated	
2015	AbleGamers Foundation's Most Accessible Games of 2014	Most Accessible Games	Won	
2015	IGN's Best of 2014	Best Action Game	Won	
2015	IGN's Best of 2014	Best Action Game - People's Choice	Won	
2015	IGN's Best of 2014	Best Overall Game	Nominated	
2015	IGN's Best of 2014	Best Wii U Game	Nominated	

== Other media ==
Bayonetta appears as a playable fighter via downloadable content in the 2014 crossover fighting games Super Smash Bros. for Nintendo 3DS and Wii U, after being one of the most requested characters to be in the game in an official ballot. She fights using various methods including combos, Witch Time, and Bullet Arts abilities from her first two games, and has alternate costumes based on her designs in both Bayonetta and Bayonetta 2. She was revealed on December 15, 2015, during the Super Smash Bros. Final Video Presentation as the winner of the ballot, being claimed to be the number one most requested character worldwide, that could be added at that time (Sora from Kingdom Hearts was revealed as the true winner 6 years later). She was made available alongside a stage based on the Umbra Clock Tower from the original Bayonetta on February 3, 2016. All of the aforementioned Bayonetta franchise content returned in the Nintendo Switch sequel Super Smash Bros. Ultimate in 2018.
