= Bayonetta 3 =

2022 video game

- Developer: PlatinumGames
- Publisher: Nintendo
- Director: Yusuke Miyata
- Producers: Yuji Nakao; Makoto Okazaki
- Designer: Akiteru Naka
- Programmer: Daichi Amano
- Artists: Yuki Suda; Mari Shimazaki
- Writers: Hideki Kamiya; Yusuke Miyata; Akiteru Naka
- Composer: Naofumi Harada
- Series: Bayonetta
- Platform: Nintendo Switch
- Release: October 28, 2022
- Genres: Action-adventure, hack and slash
- Mode: Single-player

Bayonetta 3 (Note: Japanese: ベヨネッタ3, Hepburn: Beyonetta Surī) is a 2022 action-adventure game developed by PlatinumGames and published by Nintendo for the Nintendo Switch. The game was directed by Yusuke Miyata and produced by Yuji Nakao, with series creator Hideki Kamiya as supervising director. It was announced in December 2017, and was released on October 28, 2022.

Bayonetta 3 follows the titular angel-hunting witch Bayonetta, who must face against man-made bioweapons called Homunculi, led by an entity known as Singularity, who threatens to destroy the multiverse. She is assisted by an ensemble of characters, including a coven of alternate universe counterparts of herself; and a new witch-in-training named Viola.

Following its initial announcement at The Game Awards 2017, news on Bayonetta 3 went dormant while PlatinumGames worked to release games such as Astral Chain, which was developed concurrently. The game had its first full reveal with gameplay in September 2021 during a Nintendo Direct presentation. Bayonetta's original voice actress, Hellena Taylor, was replaced by Jennifer Hale after a payment dispute.

Bayonetta 3 received generally favorable reviews from critics. It received praise for its gameplay, presentation, and supplementary content, while receiving criticism for its story, character development, camera controls, and performance issues. The game sold 1.07 million units worldwide by March 2023.

== Gameplay ==
Bayonetta 3, like its predecessors, is an action hack and slash game in which players control the eponymous protagonist Bayonetta as she combats various enemies using a combination of melee attacks and gunplay. Dodging enemy attacks at the last second triggers a state known as "Witch Time", during which time and enemies slow down, allowing Bayonetta to continually attack them without interruption, or traverse in real-time to solve environmental puzzles. Unique to this game are the "Demon Slave" and "Demon Masquerade" mechanics, the former of which differs from the preceding Climax Summon and Umbran Climax features in the first two titles, and instead allows players to take direct control of one of Bayonetta's Infernal Demons to perform various attacks and special abilities, some of which are advantageous to particular scenarios depending on the demon being controlled. The latter meanwhile, allows Bayonetta to directly fuse with a summoned Infernal Demon, granting her access to magic-based abilities, including new attack and traversal options. A new playable character, Viola, can only activate Witch Time through the use of a parry mechanic, and whose only Demon Slave Cheshire cannot be manually controlled. When Viola summons Cheshire, she switches from a sword-based fighting style to a fist-based fighting style.

In addition to the game's standard presentation, a new display mode known as the "Naive Angel Mode" is introduced. This mode conceals displays of nudity during gameplay and cinematics, such as Bayonetta's various dances to summon her Wicked Weaves using her clothing as a conduit, as well as the more graphic designs of certain enemies and demons.

== Synopsis ==
=== Setting and characters ===
Bayonetta 3 is set in a universe divided into three realms dubbed the Trinity of Realities; Paradiso, realm of the angels, Inferno, home of demons, and the human-populated World of Chaos that is split into a multiverse connected by a void dubbed the Ginnungagap. In the series' backstory, two ancient clans called the Lumen Sages and Umbra Witches−respectively aligned with Paradiso and Inferno−were driven to near-extinction in a war. In the present, a new faction of manmade bioweapons dubbed the Homunculi are destroying parallel universes. A central location in-game is Thule, a hidden island once inhabited by the Lumen and Umbra, hosting magical portals to other worlds.

The main protagonist is Bayonetta, whose real name is "Cereza", one of the last Umbran Witches. The two other playable characters are Jeanne, another Umbra Witch and Bayonetta's rival-turned-friend; and Viola, a trainee witch from a parallel world who is partnered with the cat-like demon "Chashire". The supporting cast includes Rodin, a demon weapon merchant who is friendly with Bayonetta; Luka, an investigative journalist and Bayonetta's love interest; different versions of Sigurd, a human with multiverse knowledge; and multiple variants of Bayonetta and Jeanne from the multiverse. The main antagonist is Singularity, creator of the Homunculi.

=== Plot ===
An alternate Bayonetta fights against Singularity, but is killed as Viola watches and inherits the last of her power. Viola is tasked by her commanding officer Sigurd to escape to another universe, and to seek help in the battle against Singularity. Sigurd is killed, and Viola escapes. In their home universe, Bayonetta and Jeanne witness the Homunculi launching their attack on New York City. Taking refuge with Enzo in Rodin's bar the Gates of Hell, Viola explains that the Homunculi and Singularity have already destroyed countless alternate universes; Rodin confirms that if all universes collapse, Singularity will have ultimate power over the Trinity of Realities. To stop Singularity, Bayonetta and Viola must travel to the island of Thule, which serves as a gateway between universes, and collect artefacts dubbed Chaos Gears that can open a portal to the "Alphaverse" where Singularity resides. Jeanne is tasked with infiltrating a research facility to locate their universe's version of Sigurd, a doctor and scientist with knowledge about the multiverse.

Bayonetta and Viola arrive at Thule and fight across several alternate universes and the connecting Ginnungagap. During the travels, Bayonetta pursues alternate incarnations of herself who are protecting their worlds, and fights alongside them to obtain the Chaos Gears; each is ultimately killed and absorbed by a vessel of Singularity, who is pursuing each Bayonetta incarnation as the "Arch-Eve", which can influence reality. Viola ends up pursuing Luka, who has been following them throughout the multiverse. Viola discovers that the deaths of his counterparts across the multiverse has caused Luka to transform into a wolf-like beast known as Strider, influenced by the rage of the Alphaverse's incarnation dubbed Dark Adam. It is revealed that Viola is the daughter of her universe's Bayonetta and Luka, and encounters an alternate Luka dubbed "Lukaon", king of the faeries with knowledge of the multiverse after being banished from a dying world while pursuing Strider. During one journey, Viola is knocked by Strider into the Ginnungagap. Jeanne manages to retrieve Sigurd and reconvenes with Bayonetta on Thule. Using the Chaos Gears, Sigurd opens up a portal into the Alphaverse, allowing Bayonetta access. There Bayonetta is forced to kill the transformed Luka to destroy Dark Adam, then reunites with Viola and Lukaon, who saves Luka.

They discover that Singularity's real identity was the Alphaverse's Sigurd, an artificial human who sought absolute power over the multiverse. Singularity, who was impersonating Sigurd, kills Jeanne and traps Bayonetta in the Alphaverse. Viola and Luka reach the Alphaverse too, with Bayonetta defeating Dark Adam and Lukaon restoring Luka's mind and allowing him to become "Arch-Adam", a guide to the Arch-Eve. Bayonetta, identified by Singularity as "Arch-Eve Origin", pursues and fights Singularity, freeing the spirits of Jeanne and the other Bayonettas, who briefly aid her before vanishing. She is then aided by incarnations of herself from Bayonetta and Bayonetta 2, and finally kills Singularity with help from Viola, Luka and a final Demon Summoning; Singularity's death restores the multiverse. Bayonetta, wounded and exhausted, loses control of the summon and her soul is knocked from her body. Luka saves Viola from Singularity's explosive death and subdues the summon and is dragged to Inferno with Bayonetta. Viola is then given the title of "Bayonetta" after a final fight with Dark Eve, a remnant of the Alphaverse's Bayonetta. A post-credits scene sees Viola going to school in New York while taking on jobs for Rodin.

== Development ==
Following the release of Bayonetta 2 (2014), series creator Hideki Kamiya voiced his wish to continue the series. Work on Bayonetta 3 began at developer PlatinumGames in early 2017 after the cancellation of Scalebound, with Kamiya bringing together staff and creating a design concept to pitch to series publisher Nintendo. The concept included the basic gameplay concepts, Viola, the multiverse aspect, and the demon summoning mechanics. Nintendo agreed to the sequel proposal, which Kamiya was grateful for. The design goals for the sequel were both expand on the gameplay and world design, and to return to the outrageous style of the original after what Kamiya considered the more restrained approach to the character in Bayonetta 2. Kamiya acted as a supervising director, while Yusuke Miyata was brought on as director at Kamiya's suggestion. PlatinumGames's Yuji Nakao and Nintendo's Makoto Okazaki acted as co-producers. Other core staff included lead designer and series veteran Akiteru Naka, and lead programmer Daichi Amano who was a series newcomer.

Production ran parallel to the prequel game Bayonetta Origins: Cereza and the Lost Demon (2023), with Kamiya being unsure during production which game would release first. Both Miyata and Nakao joined the project during its early production, with Kamiya deliberately taking a mostly hands-off approach to the design while contributing feedback. Miyata was initially concerned about handling the series due to its legacy, and was also concerned about how much Kamiya would influence the production. Nakao described Miyata as a stoic, focused director whom he gave as much creative freedom as possible to design the game as he liked. According to Okazaki, development did not go as initially planned, with the production period lengthened due to PlatinumGames putting in more content and features than originally envisioned. The team also wanted to make it easier for players, citing the display of Verses during gameplay rather than only at the end of a level, and not blending two different gameplay styles into a single level without warning. Due to the game's scale, Nakao was worried about whether the team would be able to complete it. Production was also impacted by the COVID-19 pandemic, requiring staff to shift to working from home, with some early design concepts being lost during the transition.

The game's design was described as "drastically different" from previous entries, with Miyata comparing their final pacing to a rollercoaster ride for players. Using the design of the first two Bayonetta games as a base, Miyata wanted to have a compelling version of the plan for Bayonetta fighting alongside her demons in combat, which evolved into the final Demon Slave mechanic. Kamiya had created the concept for Demon Slave mechanic long before development began, thinking it would be good addition to the series. Demon Masquerade was a feature suggested by Miyata, incorporating the demons and providing traversal variety lacking in Bayonetta 2. Viola's combat was inspired by her narrative role, evolving from a "wannabe ninja" style into her final form. Her guard mechanic was a point of contention between Kamiya and Miyata, as Miyata felt it would undermine her heroic role. Reportedly, a semi-open world design was planned for the game's central Thule location, but difficulties with both the story pacing and the Nintendo Switch's technical limitations prompted Nintendo to ask for the scope to be reduced.

Kamiya, who had been involved in the writing of the Bayonetta series since the original game, returned to write the scenario. Additional scenario writing was done by Miyata and Akiteru Naka. As with the first two, the scenario was created to be mostly standalone, though Kamiya felt players would enjoy the story more with knowledge of the first two games. He had a "vague idea" about how the plot would go early on, describing it using the key words "doom" and "rebirth": the logo, with a cracked numeral three, was inspired by the planned tone. While the story was darker than earlier entries, Kamiya wanted the game to have a positive ending. To counterbalance the dark themes, comedic elements were incorporated into the character interactions. Describing his goal with Viola, Kamiya wanted a type of character who was Bayonetta's mirror image, someone who could never do anything right. Kamiya had hinted at the presence of a multiverse in earlier Bayonetta titles, but Bayonetta 3 was the first time it was explicitly confirmed. Speaking about the ending, Kamiya stated he never intended to have Bayonetta die, leaving hints that both Bayonetta and Luka were restored along with the world after the final battle, a sequence depicted during Bayonetta's dance in the credits.

Yuki Suda acted as the game's art director. The world design was meant have players "travelling round the world" and seeing alternate historic possibilities. Each location was designed around a theme, such as Tokyo using kaiju, and China depicting epic battles. Mari Shimazaki returned as character designer, creating them based on Kamiya's story outline and character summaries. Bayonetta was given a third completely new design, incorporating elements from her childhood self as both an in-game story hint and a nod to fans. Viola's design was based on a scrapped character design from Bayonetta 2, with her punk rock-influenced look meant to signal her teenage rebelliousness. Several other character designs referenced recurring motifs, such as Jeanne incorporating 1960s fashion, and Luka's growing maturity and following his father's footsteps. For Singularity, Shimazaki designed his human form to appear androgynous and frail, incorporating a cloud motif referenced in other environmental elements. His boss design, created by enemy designer Honoka Yamaguchi, drew inspiration from Japanese feudal dress and villains from Japanese anime and manga. The demons were co-designed by Shimazaki and Tsuyoshi Takahashi, featuring both new takes on established demons like Madama Butterfly and demons new to the series. Shimazaki also designed both the alternate Bayonettas which she themed after each world, and the Demon Masquerade forms. The number of demons that could be included, and how to balance new and old demons, was both an occasional point of contention between Miyata and Kamiya, and a difficulty during production to properly implement.

Miyata originally wanted the game to use a photo-realistic style for Bayonetta 3, using a real-life model for Bayonetta. This presented problems modelling and portraying Bayonetta's character, with character modeller Masaki Yoritomo needing to balance input from both Miyata and Shimazaki about her in-game design. Kamiya felt that the team hit a "sweet spot" with the graphics. Bayonetta's combat animations took a year to finalise, with lead animator Takaaki Yamaguchi having trouble implementing the team's wish for Bayonetta to appear to be dancing with every fight. The dancing motif was also incorporated into how she controlled her summons during Demon Slave, an idea attributed to Miyata. In contrast to the first two games which used hand animation for facial movements, the team filmed the actors during recording and used that as a model for lip and facial movements. The cinematics were co-directed by Yuji Shimomura and Masaki Suzumura, who both worked on the original Bayonetta.

=== Music ===
The music for Bayonetta 3 was composed by a large team led by Naofumi Harada, who worked on multiple PlatinumGames projects including Bayonetta 2. The other composers were Tomoki Kameyama, Hyun Kim, Seiji Hotta, Hitomi Kurokawa, Takashi Nakabeppu, Takumi Higuchi, Aoba Nakanishi, Masahiro Miyauchi, Rei Kondoh, Masahiro Aoki, Takahiro Izutani, Ryo Furukawa, Yoshitaka Suzuki, Hibiki Yamazaki, Shu Kanematsu, and Hiroshi Yamaguchi who also acted as musical director. The sound producer was Koyo Sonae. With the exception of Harada, Kondoh and Yamaguchi, the rest of the composers were newcomers to the series. Both Harada and Yamaguchi described the experience as difficult due to its scale, but also enjoyable due to the team experience.

The musical direction for the game was "immersion", with a large number of ambient environmental tracks alongside the established bombastic style. Harada also wanted music that was dynamic, shifting depending on the gameplay, and specific instruments were used to represent each world. Composers was assigned different areas of the game to work on, such as Nakabeppu handling chase sequences, and Kim focusing on sombre cutscene tracks and boss themes for the Chinese and Egyptian worlds. Yamaguchi described it as the largest music project PlatinumGames had undertaken.

Multiple battle themes were created for the score, including a song that included "Moon" in the lyrics: in that case, a version of Glenn Miller's "Moonlight Serenade" performed by Chess Galea, who also performed the original battle theme "Al Fine", composed by Yamaguchi. The design goal for Bayonetta's combat theme was to be "passionate and mature". Viola's battle theme "GH()ST" was composed by Kameyama, performed by Mikaila Delgado of Yours Truly, with lyrics by Cody Matthew Johnson and Gina Kouyoumdjian. All the battle themes were recorded with live instruments. The ending theme "We Are As One" was composed by Yamaguchi before production on the game began. He based it on Kamiya's description of the story's planned themes and message of Bayonetta fighting for a future where she was free from past burdens. On advice from Sonae, Yamaguchi recorded the song at Abbey Road Studios with a full orchestra. The lyrics were written by the theme's singer Rachel Hawnt.

== Release ==
In July 2013, PlatinumGames executive and series creator Hideki Kamiya responded to a fan question on Twitter regarding the likelihood of a third game in the Bayonetta series in the event the then-upcoming Bayonetta 2 was a success, stating, "I hope so". Bayonetta 2 director Yusuke Hashimoto was interviewed by the magazine outlet GamesMaster, during which was asked about what game sequels he would like to work on, to which he answered that he had "all kinds of ideas" in mind for Bayonetta 3 in addition to a potential spin-off title. In June 2015 following Bayonetta 2's release, Kamiya again responded to a fan inquiry regarding the character Jeanne, and what potential new hairstyles she would look good in following her appearances in the first two games. Kamiya replied, "The answer will be in Bayo 3".

Bayonetta 3 was announced by Nintendo in December 2017 during that year's The Game Awards alongside Nintendo Switch versions of Bayonetta and Bayonetta 2, confirming the title as in development for the Switch in addition to Nintendo's involvement as its publisher. Then-President and COO of Nintendo of America Reggie Fils-Aimé remarked on the announcement as celebratory for "the fans who love what PlatinumGames does, and are thrilled to have PlatinumGames back on a Nintendo system". In June 2022, Hideki Kamiya reiterated his recommendation that newcomers play the preceding two games in preparation for Bayonetta 3, as despite there being "no reason why you won't be able to follow the story and enjoy it if you start with Bayonetta 3", he felt that prior experience with the series would help players find the third game "more interesting".

In April 2018, studio head Atsushi Inaba told Eurogamer at the Reboot Develop 2018 conference that Bayonetta 3 would mark a "turning point" for the developer, mentioning that the game would be a "linear core progression action game" in a similar vein to its predecessors. In February 2019 during an installment of Nintendo Direct, Nintendo revealed Astral Chain (2019), another action-adventure title from PlatinumGames for the Switch that was released later that August. Despite the reveal of an additional title in development at the studio however, Nintendo Switch general producer Yoshiaki Koizumi who presented the Direct, would reassure that the game would not conflict with Bayonetta 3's development, stating that PlatinumGames were still "hard at work" on the title.

Inaba was interviewed by Video Games Chronicle (VGC) in May 2019, and described the game's production as an "orthodox development process", additionally remarking that players would be able to easily observe the shifts in the studio's production mentality during gameplay, yet refusing to elaborate further. Inaba was again interviewed by the publication during E3 2019, clarifying the game's status as "going quite well".

Bayonetta 3 was unveiled by Nintendo during a Direct presentation in September 2021, revealing the first look at gameplay and its 2022 release window. The trailer additionally confirmed Yusuke Miyata as the game's director while Hideki Kamiya will be executive director. Miyata's involvement prompted speculation that a mechanic revolving around individually controlling Bayonetta's Infernal Demon summons in combat, was in fact derived from a previously cancelled PlatinumGames project, Scalebound, an action role-playing game published by Microsoft Studios intended to release for Xbox One and Microsoft Windows, as Miyata previously served as that game's lead designer. Fans additionally noted the resemblance between a new character masked in shadow during the end of the trailer, and Scalebound's intended playable protagonist, Drew. A blog post on PlatinumGames' website confirmed additional staff involved in the game, including cinematic supervisors Yuji Shimomura and Masaki Suzumura, as well as artist Mari Shimazaki, all reprising their respective roles from the previous two games.

A second trailer was released on July 13, 2022, confirming the game's October 28 launch date, and key story and character details, notably unveiling the new character Viola, the presence of alternate versions of Bayonetta, and the return of supporting characters Luka, Enzo, Jeanne and Rodin. In commemoration of the game's launch, Nintendo announced that a physical edition of the original Bayonetta on Nintendo Switch would be available in limited quantities on September 30, 2022 via select retailers and the My Nintendo Store. This would be the first time the game was available in a standalone physical format outside the Special Edition box set collecting the first game and its sequel, which released in 2018.

Bayonetta 3 was released on Nintendo Switch on October 28, 2022. Alongside the standard physical and digital releases of the game, a special edition box set known as the "Trinity Masquerade Edition" was made available at select retailers, or online through the My Nintendo Store. It features a copy of the game, accompanied by a 200-page, full color artbook with concept illustrations of the game's various demons, and alternate physical cover sleeves for the three Bayonetta games.

=== Voice acting controversy ===
Hellena Taylor, the voice actress for Bayonetta in previous games, was replaced by Jennifer Hale for Bayonetta 3. Miyata said this was due to "various overlapping circumstances". On October 15, 2022, Taylor released a series of videos in which she said she had refused an offer of US$4,000 for the role, saying it did not reflect a living wage. She urged her fans to boycott the game and instead donate to charity.

On Twitter, Kamiya said that Taylor's statements were "untrue, sad and deplorable". He blocked many Twitter users who responded to his tweet, and then temporarily deactivated his personal twitter, leading to speculation that he was suspended. Hale stated on Twitter that while she was in a non-disclosure agreement, she expressed her belief that actors should be paid well, and emphasized her past advocacy for her peers within the profession. She further urged people to keep an open mind about the amount of work that had gone into the game. Hale's involvement drew responses from voice actors such as David Hayter and Steve Blum, who spoke in support of her industry work and due diligence. PlatinumGames issued a formal response confirming that they align themselves with Hale's statement; asking people to refrain from disrespecting Hale or any of the contributors to the franchise, and stating "we give our full support to Jennifer Hale as the new Bayonetta".

On October 18, Bloomberg News and Video Games Chronicle reported that Platinum had been prepared to rehire Taylor, offering her between $3,000 and $4,000 per session for five sessions, well above the minimum SAG-AFTRA union rates. The reports said negotiations ended after Taylor requested a six-figure payment and royalties instead, and that Taylor had refused an offer to make a cameo for the fee of one session once Hale was cast. Taylor called the report "an absolute lie, and a complete joke" made to "save [Platinum's] ass and the game", and said she wished to be done with the affair and the franchise. Despite this, on October 24, Taylor made additional statements on Twitter, stating that her initial offer from Platinum was $10,000, and that she was later offered "an extra 5,0000 [sic]" after reaching out to Kamiya. Taylor further stated that she did not hear from Platinum for 11 months after this, and was then given a final offer of $4,000 to "voice some lines". Jason Schreier, the reporter who wrote the October 18 article for Bloomberg News, noted that these tweets from Taylor effectively corroborated the report.

== Reception ==
Reception

Aggregate scores
Aggregator	Score
Metacritic	86/100
OpenCritic	85% recommend

Review scores
Publication	Score
Destructoid	10/10
Digital Trends	4/5 stars
Eurogamer	Recommended
Famitsu	37/40
Game Informer	8.25/10
GamePro	88/100
GameSpot	9/10
GamesRadar+	3.5/5 stars
IGN	9/10
Nintendo Life	10/10 stars
Nintendo World Report	9/10
PCMag	4.5/5 stars
TechRadar	4/5 stars
The Telegraph	5/5 stars
The Guardian	5/5 stars
Video Games Chronicle	4/5 stars
VG247	5/5 stars
Trusted Reviews	4/5 stars

Bayonetta 3 received "generally favorable" reviews from critics, according to review aggregator website Metacritic. Fellow review aggregator OpenCritic assessed that the game received "mighty" approval, being recommended by 85% of critics.

The combat received widespread praise from reviewers. Mitchell Saltzman, writing for IGN, described it as, "one of the best combat systems in gaming". GameSpot's Jessica Howard described the gameplay as being "lightning-fast and smooth yet accommodates for different playstyles and skill levels". Chris Carter of Destructoid added how "seamless" the combat was and highlighted the game's wealth of content. The game's levels were also noted by Nintendo Life as being larger than prior games in the series, and that the game had greater replayability through challenges, collectibles, and unlockable modes.

Some reviewers criticized the game's performance and technical issues, such as an inconsistent framerate, long loading times, and occasional low-quality textures. Negative opinions were also directed at the game's camera, being labelled as "frustrating" and "annoying". The story and characterization of Bayonetta herself likewise drew heavy criticism from fans, who felt it went completely against the spirit and energy of the series' previous installments.

=== Sales ===
Bayonetta 3 sold 41,285 physical units within its first week of release in Japan, making it the second best-selling retail game of the week in the country. In the United Kingdom, Bayonetta 3 was the third best-selling game in its release week behind Call of Duty: Modern Warfare II and FIFA 23. According to NPD in the United States, Bayonetta 3 was the second best-selling Nintendo Switch title in October 2022 under Mario + Rabbids Sparks of Hope, as well as the ninth overall across all game platforms.

As of March 2023, the game had sold 1.07 million units.

=== Accolades ===
Year	Award	Category	Result	Ref.
2022	Golden Joystick Awards	Ultimate Game of the Year	Nominated	
2022	The Game Awards 2022	Best Action Game	Won	
2023	26th Annual D.I.C.E. Awards	Action Game of the Year	Nominated	
