= Zombie Strippers =

- Theatrical release poster
- Directed by: Jay Lee
- Written by: Jay Lee
- Produced by: Andrew Golov; Angela J. Lee; Larry Schapiro
- Starring: Robert Englund; Jenna Jameson; Penny Drake; Roxy Saint
- Cinematography: Jay Lee
- Edited by: Jay Lee
- Music by: Billy White Acre
- Production companies: Larande Productions; Scream HQ; Stage 6 Films
- Distributed by: Triumph Films
- Release dates: February 23, 2008 (Glasgow Film Festival); April 18, 2008 (United States)
- Running time: 94 minutes
- Country: United States
- Language: English

Zombie Strippers is a 2008 American zombie comedy film shot, edited, written, and directed by Jay Lee. The film, starring Robert Englund, Jenna Jameson, Penny Drake, and Roxy Saint, was distributed by Sony Pictures Home Entertainment.

== Plot ==
The film opens with a news montage showing a dystopic near-future in which George W. Bush has been elected to a fourth term. The United States Congress has been disbanded; public nudity is banned; the United States is embroiled in wars with France, Iraq, Afghanistan, Iran, Pakistan, Syria, Venezuela, Canada, and Alaska. Due to there being too few soldiers for all the wars, a secret laboratory run by Dr. Chushfeld in fictional Sartre, Nebraska, has developed a virus to re-animate dead Marines and send them back into battle. However, this virus has broken containment and infected test subjects and scientists, and they are at risk of escaping from the lab. A team of Marines code-named the "Z" Squad is sent in to destroy the zombies. One of the Marines, named Byrdflough, is bitten but escapes. He ends up in an alley outside an underground strip club named "Rhino". The Marine dies and awakens as a zombie who goes into the club.

"Rhino" is run by Ian Essko. A new stripper named Jessy has arrived at the club to save up enough money for her grandmother's operation. She is introduced to the club's dancers, including star dancer Kat. Kat begins her dance on the stage, but is attacked by Byrdflough. Essko, concerned about losing his best dancer, lets her go back on stage as a zombie. To everyone's surprise, Kat is a better and more popular dancer as a zombie than she was as a human.

The other strippers now find themselves faced with the prospect of losing their customers, as the customers prefer zombie strippers to human strippers. One by one, the human strippers become zombies, some by choice in order to compete or (in the case of gothic rock stripper Lillith) for fun. During private dances, the zombie strippers bite and kill their customers. Essko tries to keep the zombies hidden in a cage in the club's cellar, but eventually, the zombies escape after Gaia, wanting to become one, releases the zombies, who overrun the club. Kat and the underrated stripper Jeannie fight for supremacy. The remaining humans in the club struggle to survive until the "Z" Squad burst in to destroy the zombies. They discover that the zombies have been allowed to escape by the Bush Administration in the hopes that the ensuing zombie plague would distract Americans from their gross mishandling of the war effort and the economy.

== Cast ==
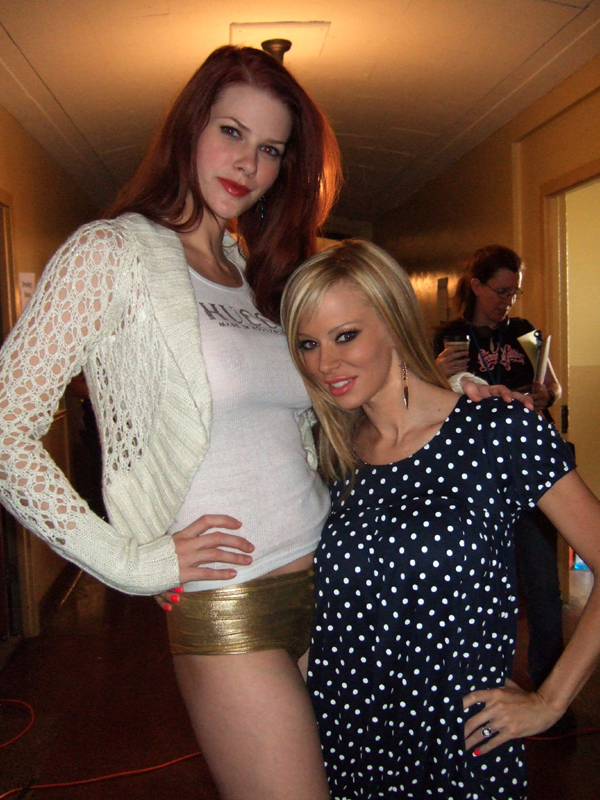
Penny Drake and Jenna Jameson on the set

- Robert Englund as Ian Essko
- Jenna Jameson as Kat
- Roxy Saint as Lillith
- Penny Drake as Sox
- Joey Medina as Paco
- Whitney Anderson as Gaia
- Jennifer Holland as Jessy
- Shamron Moore as Jeannie
- Jeannette Sousa as Berengé
- Carmit Levite as Madame Blavatski
- Johnny D. Hawkes as Davis
- Brad Milne as Dr. Chushfeld
- Zak Kilberg as Byrdflough
- Jen Alex Gonzalez as Lt. Ryker
- Tito Ortiz as door bouncer
- Kaiji Tang as zombie
- Asante Jones as Terrence
- Calvin Green as Cole
- Catero Colbert as Camus
- Billy Beck as Rincon
- Jessica Custodio as Kwan

== Inspiration ==
The film is loosely inspired by the play Rhinoceros by Eugène Ionesco, in which the characters exhibit indifference when people around them begin transforming into rhinoceroses.

== Reception ==
The film received mixed reviews from critics. On Rotten Tomatoes the film has an approval rating of 38% based on 64 reviews, with an average rating of 4.6/10. The site's consensus states: "Though intentionally campy, Zombie Strippers suffers from poor execution, and never rises above its silly premise." On Metacritic the film has a weighted average score of 45 out of 100, based on 15 reviews.

It has been criticised as having poor production values, and poor execution, while recognizing its intentionally camp style and its attempt as a satire. The film absurdly transforms the classic zombie introduced in White Zombie (1932), a mindless being without human traits, into nice, sexually attractive and desirable creatures. Richard Roeper of Ebert & Roeper stated, "It looks terrible. It doesn't work as camp. It doesn't work as low budget crap". Dennis Harvey of Variety also called it a "one-joke pic". In contrast, Michael Rechtshaffen of The Hollywood Reporter thought that there was something "perversely affecting" about this film, despite its "lame political satire".

== See also ==
- Zombies! Zombies! Zombies! (also known as Strippers vs Zombies)
- Big Tits Zombie – a 2010 Japanese fantasy-horror film, adapted from the manga Kyonyū Dragon
- 2008 in film
