= Bayonetta Origins: Cereza and the Lost Demon =

2023 video game

- Developer: PlatinumGames
- Publisher: Nintendo
- Director: Abebe Tinari
- Producers: Koji Tanaka; Makoto Okazaki; Genki Yokota; Toyokazu Nonaka
- Designer: Noriaki Nango
- Programmer: Hiroto Tanaka
- Artist: Tomoko Nishii
- Writers: Hideki Kamiya; Maho Miyata
- Composers: Aoba Nakanishi; Hitomi Kurokawa; Masahiro Miyauchi; Rina Yugi
- Series: Bayonetta
- Platform: Nintendo Switch
- Release: March 17, 2023
- Genre: Action-adventure
- Mode: Single-player

Bayonetta Origins: Cereza and the Lost Demon (Note: Japanese: ベヨネッタ オリジンズ: セレッサと迷子の悪魔, Hepburn: Beyonetta Orijinzu: Seressa to Maigo no Akuma) is a 2023 action-adventure game developed by PlatinumGames and published by Nintendo for the Nintendo Switch. Serving as a prequel to Sega's Bayonetta series, it follows a young Cereza as she ventures into the forbidden Avalon Forest alongside the demon Cheshire. The game received generally positive reviews from critics, who praised its art direction, atmosphere, gameplay, and narrative, particularly the relationship between Cereza and Cheshire.

== Gameplay ==
Bayonetta Origins is an action-adventure video game. Gameplay is split between the protagonist Cereza, a young witch in training, and Cheshire, a demon bound to her stuffed toy. Both characters are controlled simultaneously using a twin-stick control scheme. Cheshire can be toggled between two modes: in Unleashed mode, he grows to a large size and can attack enemies or obstacles, while in Hug mode, he shrinks to his toy form so that Cereza can carry him and use him for various purposes.

The player must use Cereza and Cheshire in conjunction to fight enemies and solve environmental puzzles. In combat, Cereza binds enemies using spells while Cheshire attacks them. Cheshire cannot die in combat, but he may run out of magic. When this happens, Cereza must pick him up in his plush form to restore his magic before he can be used in battle again. Certain power-ups allow Cheshire to attack while in plush form. Elemental Cores found throughout the game world can be destroyed to upgrade Cheshire's abilities, strengthening the duo in combat and allowing them to access previously inaccessible areas.

== Plot ==
Six hundred years before the events of the first Bayonetta, a young Cereza lives under the care of her strict and stoic teacher Morgana, following her exile for being the result of the forbidden union between the Lumen Sage Balder and the Umbra Witch Rosa, which led to her father's banishment and her mother's imprisonment. Feeling underappreciated despite her efforts to master her powers, Cereza ventures into the forbidden Avalon Forest after being guided there by a mysterious boy from her dreams. There, she is attacked by faeries and performs a desperate demon-summoning ritual.

The ritual binds a demon to Cereza's stuffed cat, allowing it to survive outside Inferno, though it is unable to harm its summoner. Naming the creature Cheshire, Cereza reluctantly teams up with him as they journey through the forest, hoping to find the power needed to save her mother and return Cheshire to Inferno.

The pair continue their journey through the forest, following the tracks of a white wolf, battling hostile creatures, and destroying the four Elemental Cores hidden within the thicket. During this time, Cereza grows more confident, while Cheshire gradually becomes more protective of her. Their bond is tested when a faerie disguises itself as Cereza's mother, causing an argument between the two and leading them to briefly part ways. After Cheshire is captured, Cereza ventures into the faeries' castle with the wolf's help, rescues him, and the reunited pair defeat the faerie ruler, Púca.

Deeper in the forest, the boy from Cereza's dreams is revealed to be Lukaon, a half-blood born of a faerie and a witch who was cursed for his heritage. Although Cereza initially agrees to help him, she refuses when Lukaon reveals that breaking the curse would require sacrificing Cheshire. Lukaon attempts to take the demon by force, stealing the elemental powers Cheshire had gained, but Cereza rescues him, and the pair defeat Lukaon in battle and reclaim the stolen powers.

Soon after, Púca returns with a faerie army, forcing Cereza and Cheshire to flee the forest with the weakened Lukaon. They are confronted by Morgana, who reveals herself to be Lukaon's mother and had only trained Cereza (and other girls before her) to free her son. Furious at her apprentice's compassion, Morgana turns on Cereza for not breaking the curse. Initially overwhelmed, Cereza is encouraged by Cheshire and unlocks her signature Witch Time ability, allowing her to defeat Morgana and destroy her Umbran Watch. Morgana's soul is dragged into Inferno, and after saying farewell to Lukaon, Cereza and Cheshire part ways as Cheshire returns to Inferno. Taking a ribbon from the stuffed cat to braid her hair in the style of the first game, Cereza later leaves home to begin her next journey.

After completing the game, a bonus scenario is unlocked featuring Jeanne, who enters the forest to search for Cereza. The scenario reveals the involvement of a surviving fragment of Singularity, the antagonist of Bayonetta 3, attempting to alter the future by targeting Cereza in her childhood. Jeanne and Cheshire defeat Singularity and rescue Cereza, with Jeanne resolving to continue watching over her from the shadows.

== Development ==
The game was developed by Japanese studio PlatinumGames and published by Nintendo. It was announced at The Game Awards 2022 and released for the Nintendo Switch on March 17, 2023.

The game was directed by Abebe Tinari, a Finnish game designer who joined PlatinumGames in 2013. Bayonetta Origins: Cereza and the Lost Demon was his final project at the studio before moving to Housemarque in late 2024.

== Reception ==
Reception

Aggregate scores
Aggregator	Score
Metacritic	80/100
OpenCritic	86% recommend

Review scores
Publication	Score
Destructoid	8/10
Famitsu	32/40
Game Informer	8.75/10
GameSpot	9/10
GamesRadar+	3.5/5 stars
IGN	9/10
Nintendo Life	7/10 stars
Nintendo World Report	8.5/10
PCMag	4/5 stars
Shacknews	8/10
The Guardian	3/5 stars
Video Games Chronicle	3/5 stars

Bayonetta Origins: Cereza and the Lost Demon received "generally favorable" reviews from critics, according to review aggregator website Metacritic. On OpenCritic, the game was recommended by 86% of critics.

The game's graphics and art-style were highly praised by critics. Both Marcus Stewart of Game Informer and Tom Regan from The Guardian compared the art-style favourably to Ōkami. Stewart remarked that "simply looking at Bayonetta Origins is a colorful treat", while Regan wrote that "[the game's] twist on the well-worn cel-shading art style is a handsome one". Jessica Cogswell of GameSpot said that "the game as a whole has a whimsical, painterly quality to it that perfectly suits its sense of wonder". She also praised the game's color and camera angles, noting how it was used to "create spectacles that add a bit of grandeur and magic to the intimate experience". Critics also liked how the game focused on art-style rather than graphical fidelity, with Regan writing how its cel-shading "perfectly [suits] the limitations of the increasingly creaky Nintendo Switch hardware".

The game's story received generally positive reviews. Stewart praised the story of the game, calling it his favourite compared to other games in the series. He described it as "heartwarming, humorous, coherent… and it has the emotional depth to provide substance to its eye candy". Regan said that the game was "all charming stuff, with a surprisingly solid script telling the most coherent Bayonetta story to date – a low bar, admittedly". However, he also felt that the game didn't offer many "wow moments". The relationship between Cereza and Cheshire was also positively received, with Cogswell writing that "Both Cereza and Cheshire bounce between cheeky and reluctantly compassionate with ease and pure adorableness, and it makes for a delightful dynamic that evolves into a truly special relationship".

The voice acting for the game was also received positively. Michael Higham from IGN loved the narrator's performance, particularly praising her voice for Cheshire, writing that it created "an effortlessly whimsical tone that made me feel like a kid during story time again". Stewart wrote that "[the narrator's] warm delivery and smile-inducing impression of the gruff Cheshire rekindled the long-forgotten joy of being read a fun bedtime story". Cogswell wrote that "[Cereza's] lines are delivered with sincerity, youthful joy, and emotion, and her moral compass and strength make her easy to love".

The gameplay was met with mostly positive reception. Many critics felt that it took some time to adjust to the nature of the controls. However, they noted that the game wasn't too difficult and was forgiving of mistakes made while controlling both characters. Cogswell compared the game's puzzles to those in games developed by Hazelight Studios, writing that "the game is filled with asymmetrical puzzles that require you to explore your environment and use both characters' various talents to progress". Regan remarked that, while the core combat may initially feel simplistic for adult players, it "patiently drip feeds the lessons you need to learn, developing from puzzle platformer into a child-friendly introduction to the often demanding character-action genre". Higham liked the mechanics used in boss fights, and praised the game's progression, writing that "each region smartly transitions into the next then conveniently loops back around to previous ones thanks to new abilities Cheshire gets, while also tucking away little secrets off the beaten path". PJ O'Reilly from Nintendo Life felt that the puzzles and combat never met their full potential, stating that "You'll deal with the same handful of puzzle types, moving platforms, and so on, and the combat, whilst still fun, reaches a point where every battle begins to feel overly familiar".

Bayonetta Origins: Cereza and the Lost Demon was the sixth best-selling retail game in Japan during its first week of release, with 6,474 physical units being sold.
