= Anarchy Reigns =

2012 video game

- Cover art featuring (clockwise from upper right) Jack, Sasha, Blacker Baron, Mathilda, and Leo
- Developer: PlatinumGames
- Publisher: Sega
- Director: Masaki Yamanaka
- Producer: Atsushi Inaba
- Designer: Eiro Shirahama
- Programmer: Masumi Tarukado
- Composers: Naoto Tanaka; Hiroshi Yamaguchi; Akira Takizawa
- Platforms: PlayStation 3, Xbox 360
- Release: JP: July 5, 2012; NA: January 8, 2013; AU: January 10, 2013; EU: January 11, 2013
- Genres: Beat 'em up, hack and slash
- Modes: Single-player, multiplayer

Anarchy Reigns, known in Japan as Max Anarchy (Note: Japanese: マックス アナーキー, Hepburn: Makkusu Anākī), is a beat 'em up video game developed by PlatinumGames and published by Sega for the PlayStation 3 and Xbox 360. It is the spiritual successor to the Wii video game MadWorld (2009), and was released in Japan on July 5, 2012, in North America on January 8, 2013, in Australia on January 10, and in Europe on January 11.

== Gameplay ==
The player controls one of numerous fighters, each using their own unique moveset to defeat their opponents. The player can also fight other players online in Multiplayer Mode. The game includes separate story campaigns for two characters: the "Black Side" campaign featuring returning MadWorld protagonist Jack Cayman and the "White Side" campaign featuring new character Leonhardt "Leo" Victorion. The stories occur in parallel in an open world, intersecting at various points, before converging in a final "Red Side" campaign unlocked after clearing both.

== Plot ==
=== Characters ===
The game features seventeen playable characters and one additional DLC character. Returning from MadWorld is protagonist Jack Cayman, an agent of the Chaser Guild, who is tasked to find escaped fugitive Maximillian Caxton. Competing with Jack to find and capture Max first is Max's former team, the Strike One unit, made up of villainous leader Nikolai Dmitri Bulygin, female agent Sasha Ivanoff, and reluctant agent Leonhardt "Leo" Victorion. Along with Jack, several other MadWorld characters appear, including former final boss the Blacker Baron and his assistant Mathilda, cyborg bull Big Bull Crocker, and Crimson Dragons clan member Rin Rin. Other playable characters include Rin Rin's sisters Fei Rin and Ai Rin, cyborg bounty-hunting partners Durga and Garuda, cybernetic ninja Zero, junk seller Edgar Oinkie, mutant hunter Douglas Williamsburg, and mass-produced combat mech the Gargoyle. The titular hero of PlatinumGames' Bayonetta is also playable via downloadable content.

=== Story ===
The game is set in a post-apocalyptic future in the fictional city of Altambra. Three months after being arrested for his wife's murder, former Bureau of Public Safety agent Maximillian Caxton stages a jailbreak, and his former team the Strike One Unit is dispatched to Altambra to find and kill Max. Agent Leonhardt Victorion splits off from the group to search on his own in hopes of bringing Max back alive, as he remains unconvinced that his former mentor could have turned into a violent killer. At the same time, Chaser Guild member Jack Cayman is met by Max's daughter Jeannie, who asks him to retrieve her father. Jack begrudgingly agrees, though he harbors a hatred of Max for accidentally shooting his adopted daughter Stela during a rescue mission. While searching, Jack encounters fellow bounty hunters the Blacker Baron and Mathilda, along with several drones that pursue and attempt to kill him. Meanwhile, Leo follows a trail of cyborg corpses with wounds identical to those of Ondine, Max's wife. Evidence suggests that Max's cyborg body is damaged, and Strike One determines he will head to Port Valenda to scavenge for parts.

Leo runs into Jack, who fights him to try and draw Max out. The plan works, with Max briefly appearing before quickly leaving again, and Jack and Leo give chase. They track him to Hong Long, where they split up. Leo runs into Max, who suffers from varying degrees of amnesia due to prolonged substance abuse after Stela's death. He attacks Leo, not recognizing him, but fellow agent Sasha Ivanoff and team leader Nikolai Bulygin arrive to help. After fighting Max, Nikolai prepares to execute him, but Leo intervenes, demanding a fair trial for Max. While Nikolai and Leo argue, Max runs off, and Strike One begin tracking him. Later, Jack briefly teams up with the Baron, as the two find and fight Max, whose mental state is rapidly deteriorating due to the influence of his addictions. Jack nearly kills Max in revenge, but the Baron stops Jack, allowing Max to escape. The group follows him to Bari Shur, where they encounter Sasha. The Baron and Mathilda distract her, while Jack continues looking for Max. At the same time, Leo and Nikolai continue to argue over whether Max should be returned dead or alive, culminating in a battle between the two. After defeating Nikolai, Leo and a sympathetic Sasha resume the search on their own. Jack confronts Max, who admits one of his subordinates killed Stela, though he still takes responsibility. Jack subdues Max unconscious, before Leo arrives.

Leo continues to insist that Max should be taken home to get a fair trial, but Jack would rather see Max dead. The two fight one another until the Baron, Mathilda, and Sasha stop them. Another squadron of drones appears, revealing Nikolai as the one behind them. Nikolai, implied to be the real murderer of Ondine, orders the drones to kill the other fighters and nearly executes Leo before he is saved by Jack. The two team up to defeat Nikolai, with Jack delivering the final blow. The group take Max home to Jeannie and prepare to have Nikolai put on trial for his abuse of power.

== Reception ==
Reception

Aggregate score
Aggregator	Score	
Aggregator	PS3	Xbox 360
Metacritic	71/100	73/100

Review scores
Publication	Score	
Publication	PS3	Xbox 360
1Up.com	B−	B−
Destructoid	N/A	8.5/10
Edge	6/10	N/A
Electronic Gaming Monthly	N/A	6/10
Eurogamer	9/10	N/A
Famitsu	36/40	36/40
Game Informer	7.5/10	7.5/10
GameRevolution	N/A	4/5
GameSpot	N/A	7/10
GameTrailers	N/A	7.4/10
IGN	5.9/10	5.9/10
Joystiq	N/A	3/5
PlayStation Official Magazine – UK	6/10	N/A
Official Xbox Magazine (US)	N/A	7.5/10
Polygon	N/A	7/10
The Daily Telegraph	4/5	N/A
Digital Spy	3/5	N/A

The game received "mixed or average" reviews on both platforms according to the review aggregation website Metacritic. Richard Mitchell of Joystiq praised the Xbox 360 version's good vocal performances, well-designed characters and well-performed story, but criticized the limited combat, irritating matchmaking problem and lack of competitiveness in the multiplayer modes. Mark Walton of GameSpot praised the same console version's satisfying combat, but criticized the story, repetitive single-player missions, lack of fluidity in combat, disappointing visuals, repeated textures and environment, as well as generic character design as he described most characters as "muscular video game guys, or overtly sexualised females". Chris Carter of Destructoid praised the soundtrack as well as the huge variety of playable characters, allowing players to play in every playstyle possible. However, he criticized the lack of split-screen capabilities. He also stated that the combat would be nuanced, and a bit complicated for starters, but brawler fans should find everything they're looking for with Anarchy Reigns. Mitch Dyer of IGN praised the concept of the multiplayer, but criticized the frustrating mission design which leads to repetition, disappointing and weak story, inconsistent tone, empty world, as well as numerous technical issues, such as framerate problems and fuzzy visuals. Rich Stanton of Eurogamer praised the satisfying gameplay and the multiplayer, but criticized the camera and the fighting styles that despite being various share the same visual foundations. Bradly Halestorm of Hardcore Gamer praised the PlayStation 3 version's presentation and soundtrack, stating, "Hip hop inspired tracks play between missions in the open-world where you beat up random baddies to increase an overall score value used to unlock the next story or free mission." In Japan, Famitsu gave it a score of all four nines for a total of 36 out of 40.

Roger Hargreaves of Metro gave the PS3 version a score of nine out of ten and called it "An inspired reinvention of multiplayer brawling, that carves out a whole new action genre for itself and those brave enough to learn its ins and outs." Sean Bell of The Daily Telegraph gave the same console version four stars out of five and called it "an inventive, compelling online brawler, the likes of which you won't have experienced before. It is technical and spectacular enough that it accommodates both skilled players and those who just want to mash some buttons and watch the sparks fly." Todd Ciolek of Anime News Network gave the game a B and said, "If the best side of Anarchy Reigns may be short-lived, that's all the more reason to embrace it now. The mediocre single-player experience lacks the impact of Platinum's better works, but it's just a long and simple by-product of the richer multi-character clashes that await online. And when Anarchy Reigns hits that frenzied stride, few modern brawlers can compete." Mike Splechta of GameZone gave the Xbox 360 version 7.5 out of 10 and said it was "fun, frantic and filled with ridiculous characters and some awesomely bad dialogue, but this 'spiritual successor' to MadWorld comes up short when compared to other Platinum Games' hits like Bayonetta. Though for the asking price of $29.99, it might just hold you over until the next big rush of triple A games."

Luciano Howard of The Digital Fix gave the PS3 version a score of seven out of ten and said, "The single-player game is entertaining enough and full of replayability but the structure and narrative suggest it was an afterthought when the idea of a multiplayer only title, or the challenge of learning the game in an online arena, was deigned unreasonable." Paul Goodman of The Escapist gave the same console version three-and-a-half stars out of five and said that it "may not have an incredibly in-depth story and also has some nagging flaws that detract from its otherwise entertaining gameplay, but it's enjoyable enough to warrant a playthrough." However, Mark Langshaw of Digital Spy gave it three stars out of five, saying, "Developing a multiplayer-centric title is all well and good, but Anarchy Reigns could have been something more. Playing solo is a necessity for honing your skills and unlocking new options before you take the fight online, but those tight controls and enjoyable combat feel wasted during the hollow and repetitive single-player campaign." Jose Otero of 1Up.com gave the game a B− noting: "Understandably, some may find a lot of the content excessive and repetitive, thusly, Anarchy Reigns might not appeal to everyone, but its solid combat and multiplayer offering mark a promising restart for a genre many folks forgot about."
