= Bayonetta (character) =

Video game character

- Bayonetta character
- Bayonetta in Bayonetta 2 (2014)
- First game: Bayonetta (2009)
- Created by: Hideki Kamiya
- Designed by: Mari Shimazaki
- Voiced by: English: Hellena Taylor (Bayonetta, Bayonetta 2, Anarchy Reigns, Bloody Fate, Super Smash Bros. series); Jennifer Hale (Bayonetta 3); Joy Jillian (young, Bayonetta, Bloody Fate); Angeli Wall (young, Bayonetta 3, Bayonetta Origins: Cereza and the Lost Demon); Japanese: Atsuko Tanaka (Bayonetta series, Bloody Fate, Super Smash Bros. series, Last Claudia); Miyuki Sawashiro (young, Bayonetta, Bloody Fate, Bayonetta 3, Bayonetta Origins: Cereza and the Lost Demon)
- Motion capture: Stephanie Sheh (young, Bayonetta)
- Portrayed by: Penny Drake (promotion)

In-universe information
- Origin: Vigrid

Bayonetta (Japanese: ベヨネッタ, Hepburn: Beyonetta), born Cereza (Japanese: セレッサ, Hepburn: Seressa), is the titular character and main protagonist of the Bayonetta video game series developed by PlatinumGames and is owned by Sega. She was created by Hideki Kamiya and designed by Mari Shimazaki. Hellena Taylor voiced the character in English for the first two games and several appearances outside the series from 2009 to 2018, while Jennifer Hale voiced her in Bayonetta 3 (2022). She was voiced by Atsuko Tanaka in Japanese.

Bayonetta is one of only two surviving Umbra Witches, being the child of a Witch and a Lumen Sage. During the events of the first game, she goes in search of her forgotten past, heading for her old home of Vigrid and fighting the angelic forces of Paradiso on the way. In Bayonetta 2, she becomes a demon hunter confronting her own literal demons. She appears as a guest character in other games such as Anarchy Reigns, The Wonderful 101, the Super Smash Bros. series, and Shin Megami Tensei: Liberation Dx2.

Reception of the character has been polarized but is positive overall, with some feminist commentators praising her hypersexual image as campy, sex-positive, and empowering, and others considering it sexist, objectifying, and pandering to the male gaze.

== Conception and design ==
Mari Shimazaki tried to make the witch Bayonetta more appealing with longer limbs and adjusted proportions.

Given the suggestion to create another action game by producer Yusuke Hashimoto, project director Hideki Kamiya decided to create a female lead, having felt he had already done all that could be done with male protagonists. To this end, he told character designer Mari Shimazaki to create her with three traits: a female lead, a modern witch, and to use four guns. Her name was inspired by a bayonet, meant to imply there was "more to her than meets the eye", while her four guns were named parsley, sage, rosemary and thyme after the old English ballad, "Scarborough Fair", due to Kamiya's love of folk music. Her birth name, Cereza, means "cherry" in Spanish. The process, which took a full year, went through a hundred character designs and alterations, with early appearances resembling a traditional witch, with a frayed black outfit and a "veil-like look" on her head. The outfit color persisted, described by Shimazaki as being her "theme color" due to being a witch. She was given longer legs and arms to make her more appealing as an action-game character, countering what Shimazaki felt was a trend of female characters in such games having short and thin limbs. Her limbs and the rest of her design were appealing to Kamiya, and development proceeded on the character's attire.

Bayonetta's beehive hairstyle in the first game was an aspect Shimazaki insisted on, using it as an alternative to the usual pointed hat seen on witches. However, despite concerns, Kamiya had no qualms about the hairstyle one way or another. She was additionally given glasses at Kamiya's insistence, intended to differentiate her from other female characters as well as give her a "sense of mystery and intelligence", although Shimazaki attributed it to possibly his preference for women with glasses. Her guns were modeled after a derringer pistol, in order to remain convincing and familiar, as well as to make her weapons "capable of rapid fire; a simple, rugged gun". Kamiya approved the idea, on the grounds that he felt the weapon would look "hot" in a female hand. Holsters were additionally considered for her feet, however the developers discarded the idea after feeling it wasn't feminine.

The concept of creating her outfit out of her hair was intended to fit into her design as a witch, which the development team felt meant she derived power from her hair. It was designed to both be a "means of adornment and protection", while also giving her appear "fashionable" and accentuate the movement of her limbs. During this process it was decided that as she summoned creatures to attack her enemies during the game she would lose partial control of her hair and end up in more "comfortable" attire; Shimazaki noted this as one of the aspects of the character she loved. Kamiya in addition wanted to avoid giving her large breasts and cleavage, feeling that normal sized breasts were adequate and that being mysterious was more attractive than "baring it all". The character's model was created by Kenichiro Yoshimura, who observed non-Japanese models to keep her proportions authentic, giving particular focus to her backside which, as a result, led to it being made wider and more rounded than the typically slim-hipped female characters designed by Japanese artists. While the character Jeanne came to be better liked by most of the team, Bayonetta was Shimazaki's favorite character, while Kamiya referred to her as his "ideal woman".

Her outfit in Bayonetta 2 was again designed by Shimazaki. It was generally designed more around straight lines than curves. All her jewelry and accessories were designed around this initiative apart from her glasses. There was debate about where to show skin, but when it was decided to create a cape at the front of the outfit, the front of her outfit was closed and instead they opted to show a large area of her back. For her new look, blue became a key color as opposed to the first game, where it was red: this was because water was a key theme for the second game and Hashimoto requested blue to become the design's key color. This eventually proved difficult as, combined with the black and silver incorporated into her outfit and the game's general color palette, it did not have the sharp qualities of her former appearance. Shimazaki described trying to make her stand out in her black outfit as "a nightmare". Her overall design theme was "solid". The character's hairstyle underwent a major redesign. Hashimoto's main reason behind this was that "[Bayonetta's] personality is the type that would not want to remain stagnant. She would want to change her style, taste in fashion, and her costumes. Down the line in the series, she may make further changes to her appearance." The texture of her outfit was designed to appear similar to leather, despite it still being made from her hair. Her new guns, Love is Blue (named after the song), were also difficult to design, as making them too large or too similar in color to other elements of Bayonetta's outfit would not have fitted her. In the end, they were made a more striking shade of blue, as well as being given some gold to match Bayonetta's chest piece and a silver sheen. Each of the guns, Toccata, Prelude, Nocturne, and Minuet, were given antique charms adorned with flower designs and named according to their color and the ideas they evoked to further promote and augment the new look.

== Portrayal ==
Bayonetta is voiced by Hellena Taylor in English and Atsuko Tanaka in Japanese. For the original game, despite production being based in Japan, Kamiya was particular to insist that the character have an English voice actor, and had no Japanese voice actor assigned due to his belief that speaking Japanese would not suit the character. Tanaka first voiced the character in the anime Bayonetta: Bloody Fate, an adaptation of the original Bayonetta, and subsequently assumed the role in Bayonetta 2 and the re-release of the original game on Wii U. Tanaka also voiced the character in commercials for the original game in 2009. She was chosen due to the fact that her name kept cropping up when the team asked who could best portray the character in Japanese.

For Bayonetta 3, the character's English voice was recast, a decision originally attributed by co-director Yusuke Miyata to "various overlapping circumstances"; Tanaka returned to reprise her role in Japanese. Taylor contested Miyata's statement on Twitter, alleging that the reason for leaving the role was Platinum offering her a flat rate of $4,000 for the role; an amount she found "insulting" given the series' commercial success. Her statements, combined with responses to it, prompted online controversy. However, several investigative reports disputed the story, with sources claiming that Taylor was offered a rate of $4,000 per session, for a total of 5 sessions. The role was given to Jennifer Hale, a veteran voice actress known for her work in the Mass Effect and Metal Gear series. Commenting on fan concerns surrounding the change, Miyata stated that Hale's performance was "way beyond what we could have imagined".

== Appearances ==
=== Bayonetta series ===
Bayonetta was born in Vigrid from the forbidden union of Lumen Sage Balder and Umbra Witch Rosa. The Witch was imprisoned and the Sage exiled from his clan. Bayonetta's birth caused a rift between the formally peaceful clans and eventually led to them engaging in a war. Bayonetta became a black sheep among the Umbran Witches, and during the war, Jeanne, her former childhood friend and rival, sealed her away and erased her memory to protect her from those who would exploit her power. For the next five hundred years, Bayonetta was sealed in a coffin at the bottom of a lake until she finally awakens from her sleep. Journalist Antonio Redgrave happens to be at the lake; his son, Luka, witnesses him being murdered by Balder's angels, who are killed by Bayonetta.

In Bayonetta, Bayonetta sets out for her hometown of Vigrid, where Balder is preparing to awaken the creator Jubileus and trigger the creation of a new world at the cost of the old one. She is followed there by a now grown-up Luka, who has become a journalist and has set out to show Bayonetta to the world, as an act of vengeance for her supposed role in his father's death. She also encounters Jeanne, who is under Balder's control, and Cereza, Bayonetta's younger self sent through time by the Lumen Sage. Cereza and Bayonetta bond, with Cereza believing Bayonetta to be her mother and Bayonetta eventually telling Cereza that she should keep things she treasures close to her heart, referring to a charm Cereza's mother had given her as a birthday present. Eventually, Bayonetta learns the truth after defeating Balder and sending Cereza back to her own era: Bayonetta is the "Left Eye", and regaining her memories allowed her to awaken her latent power. By bringing Cereza into the present, Balder set events into motion that would prevent Bayonetta from forgetting her past when Jeanne sealed her away. Knocked unconscious by the awakening of her power, Bayonetta is sealed within Jubileus by Balder, only to be rescued by Jeanne, newly freed from the Lumen Sage's control. Together, they destroy Jubileus and save the universe from the Second Armageddon.

In Bayonetta 2, after Gomarrah kills Jeanne following a botched summoning ritual, Bayonetta sets out to rescue Jeanne's soul from the realm Inferno, heading to the sacred mountain Fimbulventr to find the Gates of Hell. Arriving at the town of Noatun, she encounters a mysterious boy named Loki who serves as her guide to the mountain. She also reunites with Luka, who tells her about the legend of the deity Aesir, who created and ruled the Chaos Realm (Human Realm). During their journey, the pair are attacked by a masked Lumen Sage who targets Loki. When they reach the Gates of Hell, Bayonetta meets Loptr, who is apparently working with the Masked Lumen and knows Loki well. Through a vision, he reveals to her that her father Balder was not responsible for the witch hunts and tried to save her mother, who was killed by an unknown assailant who resembles Loki. To escape their attackers, Bayonetta and Loki flee into Hell, but the Masked Lumen follows them. Bayonetta rescues Jeanne and fights the Sage, revealed to be a younger version of Balder who had been targeting Loki for Rosa's murder. Loki unwillingly sends Bayonetta and Balder back to the past during the Witch Hunts, where Bayonetta meets Rosa and encounters and fights a younger version of Loptr, who she realizes murdered Rosa and framed Loki for the crime. After returning to the present, Bayonetta and Balder set out for Fimbulventr to confront Loptr, who has captured Loki. He reveals that he and Loki are the two halves of Aesir; when Aesir divided his power into the Eyes of the World, he split his soul in two, with Loki being the good half and Loptr being the evil half. Draining Loki of his power, Loptr takes the Eyes from Bayonetta and Balder and transforms into Aesir, but they defeat him and split his soul from his body. When he tries to escape into the past to be reborn, Balder stops him by sealing the soul inside his body, despite Loki warning that it will corrupt him. Bayonetta tearfully bids farewell to her father as he is transported back to the past and becomes the corrupted Balder. As Loki begins to fade, he promises to Bayonetta that they will meet again when he is reborn.

In Bayonetta 3, Bayonetta hears the call of a mysterious voice, pinpointing it to an ambush of homunculi who she defeats with Jeanne and Rodin's help. At the Gates of Hell, they meet a young witch-in-training named Viola, who claims to come from an alternate universe whose version of Bayonetta was killed by a mysterious and seemingly unbeatable enemy known as Singularity. Bayonetta, Jeanne, and Viola travel to the island of Thule, which serves as a gate to the multiverse, to collect four Chaos Gears that can lead them to the Alphaverse, where Singularity lurks, while Jeanne goes to meet with Sigurd, a doctor and scientist who has knowledge about the multiverse. Meanwhile, Viola pursues Luka, who has become a creature known as the Strider, in order to save him from his transformation's influence under his alternate self, Dark Adam. After fighting her way past four alternate universes, meeting alternate versions of herself in the process, Bayonetta obtains all four Chaos Gears and, along with Jeanne and Sigurd, unlocks the way into the Alphaverse. However, Sigurd reveals himself as a disguised Singularity, kills Jeanne, and traps Bayonetta and Viola in the Alphaverse. There, Bayonetta fights Luka in his Strider form and frees him from Dark Adam's influence before defeating Singularity with the aid of the spirits of Jeanne, the alternate Bayonettas, and her past-game versions, restoring the multiverse. However, Bayonetta's Umbran Watch breaks, causing her to lose control of a summoned demon and knocking her soul from her body. Luka rescues Bayonetta as the two share a kiss and are dragged together into Inferno. Afterwards, Viola inherits the title of Bayonetta after defeating a spirit known as Dark Eve, who is revealed to be a remnant of the Bayonetta of the Alphaverse.

In Cereza and the Lost Demon, set six hundred years before the Witch Hunts began, Bayonetta's origin story is revealed. During her time training under Morgana, an exiled Umbra Witch, Cereza frequently experiences a dream that tells her of Avalon Forest, the home of the enigmatic soul-stealing Faeries that Morgana had strictly warned her not to enter. However, one dream differs from the others, and Cereza sees a vision of a mysterious boy telling her to go into the forest to find a way to save her. Ignoring Morgana's warnings, Cereza enters Avalon Forest to become strong and save her mother. Cereza is attacked by Fairies and fends them off by summoning a demon, which she accidentally binds to her stuffed cat. The demon begrudgingly agrees to accompany Cereza, who names him Cheshire. Cereza reaches the deepest part of the forest, where the boy she saw in her dreams, named Lukaon, explains that he was cursed for being the half-blood son of a faerie and a witch. Cereza sympathetically agrees to help him, but becomes conflicted when Lukaon explains that he needs a demon's essence to free himself from the curse. Púca, the ruler of the faeries, attacks Cereza, and Cheshire, Lukaon, and Cereza narrowly escape from the forest before being saved by Morgana, who reveals herself to be Lukaon's long-lost mother and attacks Cereza to avenge her son. With Cheshire's encouragement, Cereza defeats Morgana, destroying her Umbran Watch and knocking her soul from her body. Morgana's soul is dragged down into Inferno—a fate that eventually befalls every Umbra Witch—and Cereza and Cheshire share a farewell of their own before Cheshire returns home.

=== Other appearances ===
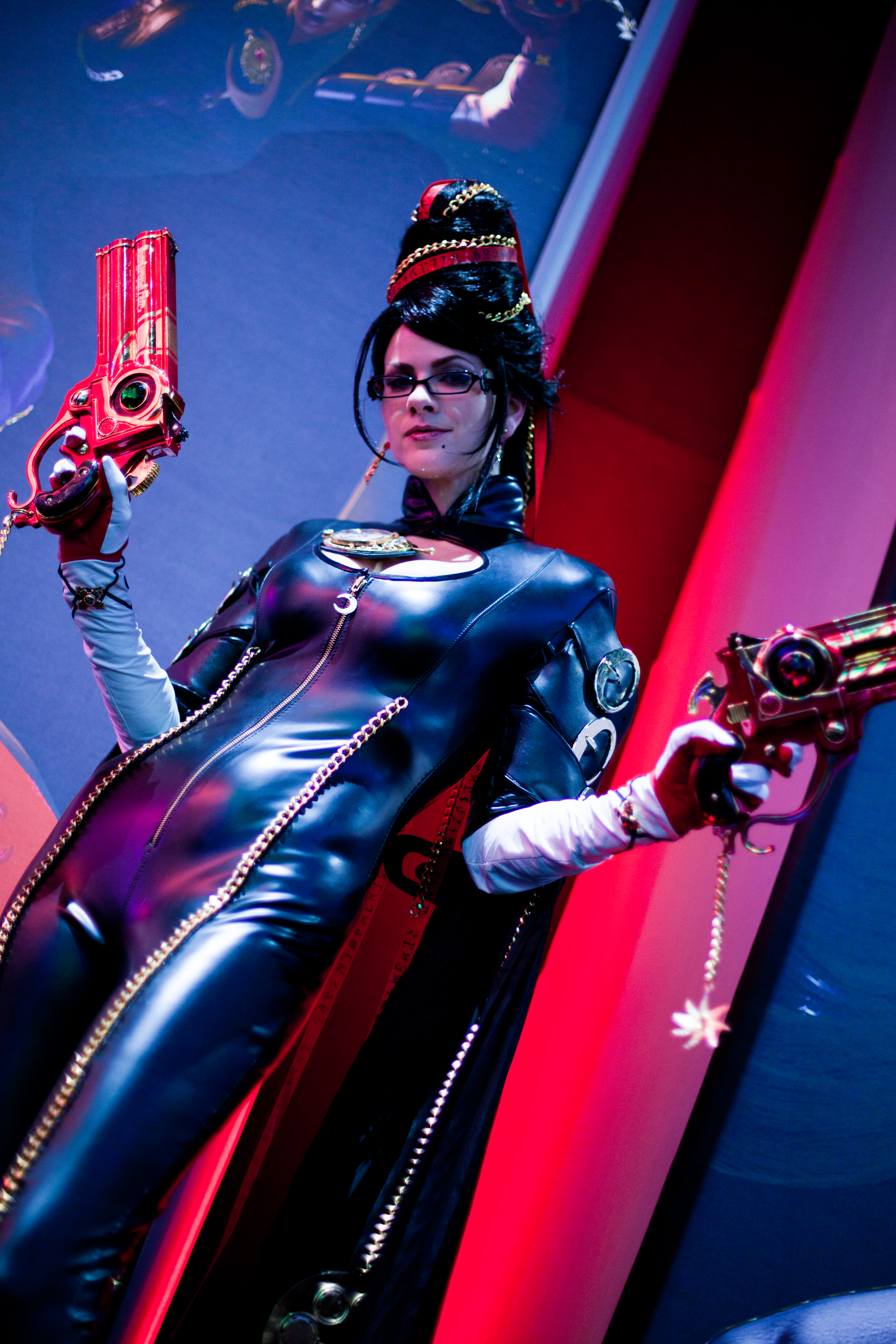
Penny Drake dressed as the character at E3 2009

At the 2009 Electronic Entertainment Expo (E3), Sega chose Penny Drake to model as Bayonetta after auditioning 100 women. To promote the character and the game, Playboy featured several models dressed as her for viewers to vote which they considered the best.

Bayonetta starred in the anime film Bayonetta: Bloody Fate, an adaptation of the first Bayonetta game. She also appears as a downloadable character in Sega's multiplayer fighting game Anarchy Reigns, and as a special guest character alongside Jeanne and Rodin in Nintendo's action game The Wonderful 101.

In a Nintendo-sponsored fan poll asking for playable character suggestions for Super Smash Bros. for Nintendo 3DS and Wii U, Bayonetta was the most popular choice among "negotiable" characters worldwide, placing among the top five vote-getters in the United States and placing first in the polls in Europe. As a result, she was released alongside a stage based on the falling Umbra Clock Tower from Bayonetta on February 3, 2016, in North America and on February 4, 2016, in Europe. Both the character and stage return in the sequel Super Smash Bros. Ultimate, this time in the initial release.

Bayonetta also appears in 8-Bit Bayonetta, a free minigame created to promote the PC release of Bayonetta. She was added to Sonic Racing: CrossWorlds in November 2026 as the first new character of the game's second year of updates.

== Critical reception ==
Bayonetta was mostly well received upon her debut. In their review of the first game, the staff of PSM3 praised how well the character held the player's attention, stating that while every line she spoke "dripped" with sexual innuendo, "it's all very tongue in cheek". Additionally despite considering her one of the sexier characters they'd seen in gaming, "you're never asked to seriously consider Bayonetta as a sex object", and instead she poked at gaming conventions for how silly they were. Comparing her to prominent sex symbols in gaming at the time such as Lara Croft they felt she approached the subject matter better, and further described her as "one of the most memorable, likeable characters in the history of games". GameSpot's Mark Walton also praised her, stating, "[D]espite suffering crotch shots and blatant innuendos …[Bayonetta] remains one of the most charismatic and powerful heroines in the medium. [...] the sexualisation here serves to empower, not to belittle."

IGN in particular gave her glowing praise. Ryan Clements described the character as a "hardcore badass" that was also "brimming with sexual energy", further describing her as an "immensely powerful protagonist". However, associate editor Nicole Tanner disagreed, noting she did not find the character's sexuality at all empowering as "just because you give a girl an attitude and guns isn't enough to offset what she looks like". Other members of IGN's staff named her their favorite video game character, describing her as "the playfulness and versatility of Dante" combined with "visually inventive combat". They cited her constant nudity as a point of appeal, calling the mechanic of her hair serving as her clothing both one of the stupidest and one of the coolest elements of a character.

Sae K. Kim of GamePro on the other hand complained that the character's "overt sexuality and frantic anime-inspired shenanigans" hampered her appeal in his view, comparing her to a "skilled magician who is terrific at sleight of hand" but feeling that she overly relied on a "heavily overproduced stage show complete with burlesque dancers and a rocking soundtrack" for her presentation. As a result in Kim's eyes she fell flat as a protagonist, and while he acknowledged many would find appeal in her appearance and "vampish" approach he had preferred for her overt nature to be toned down. While Arthur Gies of Polygon praised Bayonetta 2 for giving the character "some much-needed development as a human being who cares about things other than herself", he was significantly concerned about other aspects of her depiction, such as gratuitous camera angles that were "frequently provided as an implicit reward for doing well. … It's sexist, gross pandering, and it's totally unnecessary." He felt that such issues "cause[d] an otherwise great game to require a much bigger mental compromise to enjoy". Edge stated that, although "Bayonetta's default design shows how to walk the tightrope between sexy and sexualised", certain optional costumes "range from the respectable to the cringeworthy".

In 2018, Lady Gaga expressed her love of the character, referring to her as "tough". In 2020, Lady Gaga released a music video for "Rain on Me" containing several references to Bayonetta. The style of small glasses worn by Bayonetta became a fashion trend in the mid-2020s, inspired by the "geek chic" trend of the 2000s, and became known online as "Bayonetta glasses". They were first popularized by model Bella Hadid in early 2024, when Google searches for "Bayonetta glasses" also peaked.

=== Regarding female empowerment ===
In an editorial for The Guardian on female characterization, Ria Jenkins praised Bayonetta as a character who is "unapologetically feminine, sexual and confident. Dismissed by many as an objectified fantasy, she is a woman without compromise who refuses to be ashamed of her body." She noted that in contrast to Lara Croft, where Croft's sex appeal was secondary, in Bayonetta's case she utilized it as a powerful weapon. To this end, the character made many of the male cast, and per Jenkins' own suggestion some male players, uncomfortable, and helped illustrate her as "a power trip for and about women". Jenkins further stated that as a character her autonomy and control over her body and femininity helped distance her portrayal as one seen as pandering to the male audience, and demonstrated the fact she was a powerful woman as compared to being "powerful in spite of being a woman". Additional comparison was brought up between the character and her younger self, Cereza, and how it not only illustrated a maternal side of Bayonetta, but also drew a distinction between woman and child by giving them different names, "the sexed and non-sexed subject". In Jenkin's view it allowed the subject to illustrate Bayonetta's growth as a character, whereas other portrayals of women in video games portrayed women as synonymous with vulnerability in Bayonetta's case she left hers behind.

Leigh Alexander in an article for GamePro noted that while the character was sexually overt, she felt that Bayonetta could be seen as an empowering symbol for women. She noted that many of the thematic stylings that Hideki Kamiya had worked into his previous games such as Devil May Cry were also equally present in Bayonetta. While in those titles Alexander acknowledged the female characters were "strong, sexy women", they were in her eyes often reduced to eye candy, while in the case of Bayonetta the character used their sexuality as a source of strength, bringing the "video game sexy woman stereotype from object to subject, and it's tremendously empowering". The framing of the game's world further helped support this, with the emphasis on strong women and the use of feminine imagery such as the "subtle grace of Bayonetta's butterfly-shaped shadow". Alexander further stated that while there had been debate on what exactly constituted an image of an empowering woman and that several had emerged in years prior, she felt it was "unfair to strip video game women of their sexuality completely", or moreso act as if the use of sexuality implied the character was being exploited. She added that the character's hypersexualization was intended to be "intentionally unrealistic", continuing a theme of unrealism common in Kamiya's works. She added that those treating a stylized female body as a personal affront overlooked the character's "particular brand of femininity", and that she felt Bayonetta not only an "innovative approach to the idea of female power", but also presented the first game that made her "directly conscious of how cool it is to be a girl".

Johanthan Holmes of Destructoid on the other hand stated that such defense of the character surprised him after the game's release, feeling that a female character that "reinforces the idea that women need to self-objectify in order to get what they want isn’t doing much for feminism". He further drew issue with Kamiya's own statements regarding the character and positive portrayals of femininity, calling the interpretation of her as an empowering figure "skewed". Instead he saw the character as an empty shell reflecting her creator's sexual fantasies and "misconceived notions of the female gender", further stating that if the character was male at least it would go against convention, but as it was he considered Bayonetta a step back for the portrayal of women in video games. In a follow up article, he further decried what he saw as her unrealistic body proportions, stating she "does not look like an Earthling" due to her long legs. He further argued similar proportions applied to other video game characters would highlight the issues in her design, although acknowledged his criticism was in no way a demand to change her design.

== See also ==
- List of female action heroes and villains
- List of fictional witches
- Gender representation in video games
