= Atsuko Tanaka =

Japanese voice actress (1962–2024)

- 田中 敦子
- Born: November 14, 1962; Maebashi, Gunma Prefecture, Japan
- Died: August 20, 2024 (aged 61)
- Other name: Atsuko Satō
- Education: Ferris University
- Occupations: Voice actress; narrator
- Years active: 1980–2024
- Agent: Mausu Promotion
- Children: 1

Atsuko Tanaka (田中 敦子, Tanaka Atsuko; November 14, 1962 – August 20, 2024) was a Japanese voice actress and narrator. Born in Maebashi, she became interested in acting during her youth, and while educated at Ferris University, worked as a background extra at Shochiku. After spending years working as an office lady for a Tokyo executive, she enrolled in the Tokyo Announcement Academy and joined the talent agency Mausu Promotion, with whom she was still affiliated at the time of her death.

She was best known for her portrayal of Motoko Kusanagi in the Ghost in the Shell film and franchise, and she also voiced Konan in Naruto, Caster in Fate/stay night, Lisa Lisa in JoJo's Bizarre Adventure, Chun-Li in Street Fighter III: 3rd Strike, Claudette in Queen's Blade, Karura in Utawarerumono, Bayonetta in the Bayonetta franchise, Hanami in Jujutsu Kaisen, Kyrie Ushiromiya in Umineko no Naku Koro ni, and Rhinedottir in Genshin Impact.

== Biography ==
=== Early life and career ===
Tanaka was born on November 14, 1962, in Maebashi, the capital city of Gunma Prefecture. Her paternal great-uncle was Gorō Murata, who was governor of Gunma Prefecture from 1941 until 1943. During her youth, she and her family often saw live Takarazuka Revue performances and went to the local cinema theatre Orion-za, and she became interested in acting after seeing a stage play broadcast on live television. Passionate about acting and dancing, she joined the drama club at Maebashi Municipal Nankitsu Junior High School and the dance club at Gunma Prefectural Maebashi Girls High School, and while studying at Ferris University, she was part of the university's drama club and had part-time jobs at Shiki Theatre Company and Shochiku Ofuna Studio, working as a background extra for the latter.

After graduating from Ferris, she took a break from acting and relocated to Tokyo to become an office lady for a private company's male executive. After finding it unreasonable to work as an office lady until retirement, she decided to change careers after about six years with her employer, later recalling in a 2022 interview: "Even if it's not stable, if I can get a job that I like, it's rewarding and I can do it for the rest of my life". While she continued her dancing career during her office lady career, she decided to end it because "somewhere in my mind [she] felt like [she] had done everything [in dancing she] could".

After she chose acting over dancing, she became interested in voice acting after meeting a fellow dancer from her native Gunma Prefecture who was also a voice actor, with another inspiration being voice actress Yukiko Nikaido. She subsequently joined the Tokyo Announcement Academy in order to study voice acting and get voice acting work, graduating in 1991. After failing to find a talent agency that would hire her, she was eventually invited to join Ezaki Production by manager Mitsue Ono. She then joined the agency's training school and, despite her parents' objections, quit the company she worked at as an office lady after six years after getting enough voice acting work.

=== Voice acting career ===
After graduating from Tokyo Announcement Academy, she formally joined Ezaki Production (which would later become Mausu Promotion), where she remained until her death. At the encouragement of her Tokyo Announcement Academy teacher, sound director Morio Kobayashi, she took on roles she herself thought were "unsuitable for her", such as heroine roles. Her first lead role was as Karen Carr in the Japanese dub of the 1992 American film Unlawful Entry. Although her parents initially disapproved of her voice acting career, they reconsidered after starring as the guest heroine in the 1993 Lupin the 3rd television special "Voyage to Danger".

In 1995, she started voicing Motoko Kusanagi, the protagonist of the 1995 film Ghost in the Shell, a role she recalled was the first one "where [she] was rambling on about incomprehensible terms"; she reprised the role in the Ghost in the Shell franchise's media for 27 years thereafter. Tanaka retrospectively cited this as one of the most memorable roles of her voice acting career. A year before her death, she reprised her role in the second season of Ghost in the Shell: SAC_2045.

Outside of Ghost in the Shell, among her other voice acting roles in anime were Coffee in Cowboy Bebop, Margot Langer in Monster, Caster in Fate/stay night, Harumi Kiyama in A Certain Scientific Railgun, Konan in Naruto: Shippuden, Yuri Nikaido in The World God Only Knows, Lisa Lisa in JoJo's Bizarre Adventure, Reina in Yakuza Kiwami, and Hanami in Jujutsu Kaisen.

Her video game roles included the titular protagonist of Bayonetta, Trish in Devil May Cry, Kainé in Nier, Lara Croft in Tomb Raider, Impa in The Legend of Zelda: Skyward Sword (2011), Gaby in Shin Megami Tensei IV (2013), Yennefer in The Witcher 3: Wild Hunt (2015), Jerri in Persona 5 Tactica (2023), and Rhinedottir in Genshin Impact (2023), as well as Layla Hassan in Assassin's Creed and Chun-Li and Poison in Street Fighter. In 2020, she won the Foreign Movie/Drama Award at the 14th Seiyu Awards. She then starred as Mary Sera in Case Closed, Flamme in Frieren, Rose in The Wrong Way to Use Healing Magic, and Ōmurasaki no Omae in Yatagarasu: The Raven Does Not Choose Its Master.

Tanaka also worked in foreign works as a Japanese-language dub actress. Among the actresses she dubbed, she had a particularly strong attachment to Nicole Kidman, feeling "a great chemistry" with her and describing herself as "the one person in Japan who understands her acting the best." Other actresses she dubbed include Kate Beckinsale, Angelina Jolie, Jennifer Lopez, Gwyneth Paltrow, and Julia Roberts. She also worked as a narrator.

=== Personal life and death ===
Tanaka had a son, voice actor Hikaru Tanaka, who did not disclose his familial relationship before announcing her death, and a younger sister. She considered Kikuko Inoue to be her best friend.

Outside of acting, she also had a side career of giving pandas names, including as a godparent of Adventure World's giant pandas Yuihin and Saihin, and at point appearing as the anonymous Kanjuku Mango (完熟マンゴー, Kanjuku Mangō; lit. 'ripe mango') in Shinichiro Azumi's panda name prediction radio show Azumi Shin'ichirō no Nichiyō Tengoku. She was a fan of the Hokkaido Nippon-Ham Fighters baseball team, and she and Rika Fukami would often go to the stadiums to attend games.

On August 20, 2024, Tanaka died at the age of 61, one year after being diagnosed with an undisclosed illness. Fellow voice actress and friend Kikuko Inoue had visited Tanaka at the hospital prior to the latter's death. Condolences came from many of the people, teams, and works she worked with, including her Fate/stay night co-star Jouji Nakata, Ghost in the Shell co-star Koichi Yamadera, Bayonetta developer PlatinumGames, and the Frieren and Nier franchises.

A memorial exhibition dedicated to her opened on November 14, 2024, at the Historia Maebashi.
