= Penny Drake =

American actress

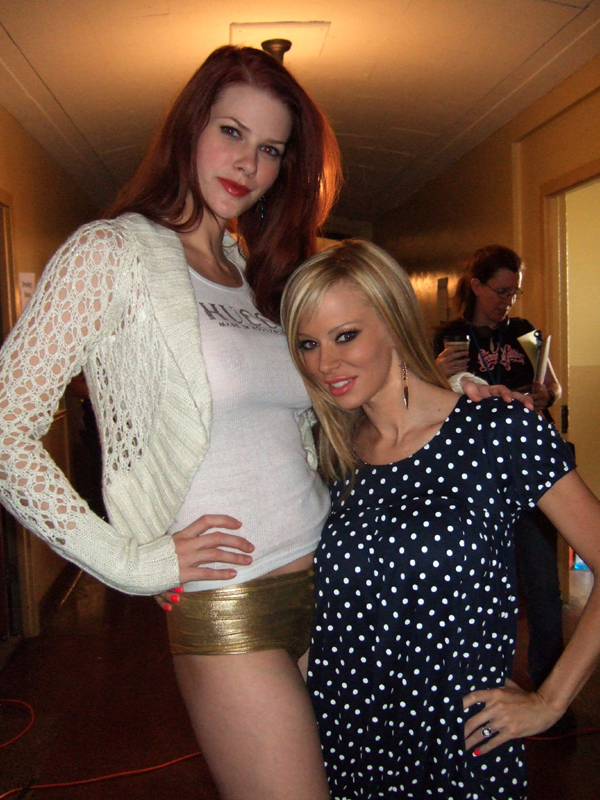
- Penny Drake (left) together with Jenna Jameson
- Born: Penny Drake; 20 July 1977 (age 48); San Antonio, Texas; United States
- Occupations: Actress, model
- Years active: 2005–present
- Website: http://www.pennyvital.com/

Penny Drake (born September 20, 1977), is an American independent film actress and model. Her modelling career since 2008 has included work for Herra Couture, Flora Zeta and Ed Hardy. In June 2009 she appeared as the video game character Bayonetta at the Electronic Entertainment Expo (E3) in Los Angeles.

Penny's movie appearances since 2005 include parts in Sin City and The 40 Year Old Virgin. She also stars in Zombie Strippers alongside Jenna Jameson and Robert Englund, and in Necrosis played with Michael Berryman and George Stults.

In 2006–2008 she played co-anchor Mary Clark in the Bikini News Web-based satirical video series.

== Filmography ==
- The 40 Year Old Virgin (2005)
- Sin City (2005)
- Monarch of the Moon (2005)
- The Slaughter (2006)
- You're So Dead (2007)
- The Cook (2008)
- Zombie Strippers! (2008)
- Necrosis (2009)
- Dreamkiller (2010)

=== Television ===
- 2008: "Star Chicks"
