= Bayonetta =

Video game series

- Genres: Action-adventure; Hack and slash
- Developer: PlatinumGames
- Publishers: Sega; Nintendo
- Creator: Hideki Kamiya
- Platforms: PlayStation 3; Xbox 360; Wii U; Microsoft Windows; Nintendo Switch; PlayStation 4; Xbox One
- First release: Bayonetta; October 29, 2009
- Latest release: Bayonetta Origins: Cereza and the Lost Demon; March 17, 2023

Bayonetta (Japanese: ベヨネッタ, Hepburn: Beyonetta) is an urban fantasy action-adventure game franchise created by Hideki Kamiya. It is developed by PlatinumGames, owned by Sega, and, since the release of Bayonetta 2 in 2014, published by Nintendo. The franchise was introduced in 2009 with Bayonetta, which was followed by two sequels, Bayonetta 2 (2014) and Bayonetta 3 (2022), as well as a prequel, Bayonetta Origins: Cereza and the Lost Demon (2023). The games follow the titular character, a witch who wields dual pistols, shooters in her high heels, and long, magically transforming hair which becomes a supernatural weapon. The series has been met with strong critical reception, is considered PlatinumGames' flagship series, and is one of Sega's most well-known franchises.

== Video games ==
Release timeline
2009	Bayonetta
2010–2013
2014	Bayonetta 2
2015–2021
2022	Bayonetta 3
2023	Bayonetta Origins: Cereza and the Lost Demon

=== Bayonetta (2009) ===
The first game in the series was directed by Hideki Kamiya, who created the Devil May Cry and was involved with the Ōkami franchise while he was working with Capcom. It was the third title in Platinum's four-game contract with Sega. The game was released on October 29, 2009, in Japan, and was released worldwide in January 2010 for Xbox 360 and PlayStation 3. The game received generally positive reviews upon release. More than 1.35 million units of the game were shipped. Although it was Platinum's most commercially successful game at that time, the company was disappointed with its sales. A 4K remastered version of the game featuring anti-aliasing, anisotropic filtering, SSAO lighting, scalable texture and shadow quality, and more was released on PC in April 2017. The game was ported to Nintendo Switch in 2018, and was bundled alongside Vanquish for PlayStation 4 and Xbox One in February 2020.

=== Bayonetta 2 (2014) ===
Bayonetta 2 was announced in 2012 during a Nintendo Direct for the Wii U. The decision received backlash from fans, since the game would not be available on other platforms. Platinum was initially working with Sega to create the sequel, but Sega decided to cancel the game during the game's development. Nintendo subsequently revived the project. According to producer Atsushi Inaba, the game would not have been possible if they did not get the funding and the support from Nintendo. Sega remained as the game's consultant. The game was directed by Yusuke Hashimoto, and Kamiya has a supervision role. The game was released in 2014 to very positive reviews. While sales for the Wii U version have not been fully disclosed, by March 2018, Nintendo confirmed the Switch version had sold 400,000 copies during its first nine weeks, compared to the 300,000 copies the Wii U version sold during the same period. As of December 2021, the Switch version has sold 1.04 million copies worldwide.

=== Bayonetta 3 (2022) ===
A third game in the series was announced by Nintendo at The Game Awards 2017. A gameplay trailer was shown at the September Nintendo Direct 2021. It was released for the Nintendo Switch on October 28, 2022, and opened with positive reviews from both critics and fans. The game went on to win Best Action Game at the Game Awards 2022. The game also features a playable teaser for Cereza and the Lost Demon as a secret level and unlocks a special skin once found.

=== Bayonetta Origins: Cereza and the Lost Demon (2023) ===
A prequel companion game to Bayonetta 3, focusing on Cereza as a young girl, was announced by Nintendo at The Game Awards 2022. It was released on Nintendo Switch on March 17, 2023.

=== Other video games ===
An action/shooter 16-bit-style browser minigame called "8-Bit Bayonetta" was released on February 16, 2015, and later on Steam on March 31, 2017.

Outside of the Bayonetta series, Bayonetta characters have made guest appearances in other Sega and PlatinumGames releases. Bayonetta appears as a downloadable character in the multiplayer fighting game Anarchy Reigns. She, Jeanne, and Rodin also appear a special guest characters in the action game The Wonderful 101. Bayonetta was added as a downloadable character to Super Smash Bros. for Nintendo 3DS and Wii U, later returning as an unlockable character in the sequel Super Smash Bros. Ultimate. Both games also feature a stage based on the falling Umbra Clock Tower which appeared in the first two Bayonetta games. Rodin also appears as an Assist Trophy in Ultimate. Bayonetta will be added to Sonic Racing: CrossWorlds as a playable character via a forthcoming free update.

== Other media ==
An anime film based on the first game, titled Bayonetta: Bloody Fate, was produced by Gonzo and released in 2013 in workings with Sega.

In 2014, Udon Entertainment released a book titled The Eyes of Bayonetta, which included a list of her abilities.

== Reception ==
Sales and aggregate review scores
Game	Year	Units sold	Metacritic	OpenCritic
Bayonetta	2009	PS3: -; X360: -; WIIU: -; PC: -; NS: 1.24 million; PS4: -; XONE: -	PS3: 87/100; X360: 90/100; WIIU: 86/100; PC: 90/100; NS: 84/100; PS4: 81/100; XONE: -	92% recommend
Bayonetta 2	2014	WIIU: -; NS: 1.23 million	WIIU: 91/100; NS: 92/100	94% recommend
Bayonetta 3	2022	1.04 million	86/100	85% recommend
Bayonetta Origins: Cereza and the Lost Demon	2023	< 1.00 million	81/100	86% recommend

Bayonetta, Bayonetta 2, and Bayonetta 3 each received generally positive reviews from critics according to review aggregator Metacritic. Bayonetta 2 was nominated for Game of the Year at The Game Awards 2014, though it ultimately lost to Dragon Age: Inquisition. The release of Bayonetta 3 was preceded by controversy after Hellena Taylor, who voiced the character in the first two games, publicly accused PlatinumGames of offering her an "insulting" sum to reprise the role and called on fans to boycott the game. Taylor was subsequently replaced by Jennifer Hale. Reports subsequently disputed Taylor's account of the compensation offered, and Taylor later confirmed she had been offered a larger sum than initially stated, though she maintained the overall offer was unfair given the game's anticipated commercial success.
