= Magna Carta (disambiguation) =

Magna Carta is the first of a series of constitutional charters in English law.

Magna Carta may also refer to:

== Places ==
- Magna Carta Island, in the River Thames in England
- Magna Carta Place, in Canberra, Australia
- Magna Carta Memorial, at Runnymede, England

== Music ==
- Magna Carta (band), an English folk rock band
- Magna Carta... Holy Grail, a 2013 album by Jay-Z
- Magna Carta Records, a music label

== Film ==
- Pre-Code, a resolution preceding the Hays Code

== Video games ==
- Magna Carta (series)
  - Magna Carta: The Phantom of Avalanche, a 2001 Korean RPG video game
  - Magna Carta: Crimson Stigmata, a 2004 Korean RPG video game
  - MagnaCarta 2, a 2009 Korean RPG videogame

== Other uses ==
- Magna Carta (barge), a hotel barge
- Magna Carta (Italy), a think tank within The People of Freedom political party
- Magna Carta (An Embroidery), an artwork by Cornelia Parker
- Magna Carta revolt of 1213–1215
- The Magna Carta School, a school in Surrey, England
- The Magna Carta of Aragon of 1287, see Union of Aragon

== See also ==
- Magna Carta Hiberniae, an issue of the English Magna Carta, or Great Charter of Liberties in Ireland
