= Destiny Child =

2016 video game

- Developer: Shift Up
- Publishers: Line Games (2016–2019); Shift Up (2019–2023)
- Director: Kim Hyung-tae
- Artist: Kim Hyung-tae
- Platforms: Android; iOS
- Release: South Korea: October 27, 2016; Japan: November 24, 2017; Global: December 6, 2018
- Genres: Role-playing, gacha
- Modes: Single-player, multiplayer

Destiny Child was a South Korean free-to-play mobile gacha role-playing game developed by Shift Up and originally published by Line Games. It was directed and designed by Kim Hyung-tae, the studio's founder, who was known for his previous work on Blade & Soul and the Magna Carta series. The game was first released in South Korea on October 27, 2016, followed by a Japanese release in November 2017 and a global English release in December 2018.

The game centers on a large roster of collectible characters called "Childs," rendered in Live2D animation and drawn in Kim Hyung-tae's distinctive art style. Players assemble teams of up to five Childs to battle through a story-driven campaign, player-versus-player modes, and cooperative raid events.

Destiny Child was discontinued on September 21, 2023, following an announcement by Shift Up CEO Kim Hyung-tae. At the time of closure, the game had been operational for nearly seven years and featured over 500 collectible characters.

== Gameplay ==
Destiny Child was gacha game in which players collect characters — referred to in-game as "Childs" — through a summoning system using in-game currency. Characters range in rarity from 1★ to 5★, with 5★ units being the most powerful and sought-after. The game employs a pity system that guarantees a 5★ unit after a set number of summons, and special rate-up banners feature specific characters with increased summon probabilities.

== Story Dungeon ==
The primary single-player mode, divided into chapters with dialogue, cutscenes, and boss encounters.

- Ragna Break (World Raid) – A cooperative multiplayer mode in which players worldwide battle large, powerful boss enemies to earn ranking-based rewards.
- Devil Rumble (PvP) – A player-versus-player mode where pre-set teams automatically battle against each other. Players climb a seasonal leaderboard for exclusive rewards.
- World Boss – A limited-time cooperative event in which the entire global player base must collectively defeat a powerful enemy within a set time period.
- Explore – A passive idle mode where Childs gather resources automatically over time.

== Premise ==
The story of Destiny Child takes place across three realms: the Celestial Realm (home of the gods), the Infernal Realm (home of demons), and the Mortal Realm (inhabited by humans). After the ancient Archfiend Lucifaro abruptly abdicates his throne, an "Archfiend Contest" begins, in which demon candidates must gather human souls by forming pacts with humans and recruiting supernatural entities called Childs to build armies.

The protagonist — a socially awkward demon tired of the Infernal Realm — has moved to the Mortal Realm and is living a quiet life working part-time at a convenience store. After accidentally agreeing to the terms of a mysterious email without reading them, he is unexpectedly enrolled in the Archfiend Contest by Mona, a scheming succubus who becomes his guide and primary aide. Considered the weakest of all Archfiend candidates, the protagonist must navigate increasingly dangerous battles while wrestling with moral doubts about sacrificing Childs for the Contest.

The narrative is delivered primarily through visual-novel-style story chapters, character-specific "Affection" stories unlocked through bonding, and limited-time event storylines.

== Characters ==
The game featured over 500 playable characters at the time of its shutdown, all referred to as "Childs." Each Child belongs to one of five elemental attributes — Fire, Water, Wood, Light, and Dark — and fulfills one of several combat roles: Attacker, Defender, Supporter, Healer, or Debuffer.

Characters are drawn in a highly detailed, stylized art style distinctive to Kim Hyung-tae. Each Child is animated using Live2D technology, which gives the otherwise still illustrations fluid, dynamic motion in menus and during battle. Many characters are inspired by figures from world mythology, folklore, and literature — including characters named after deities, demons, and historical figures from Korean, Greek, Norse, and other traditions.

The global release of the game featured mild censorship compared to the Korean server, with certain character costumes modified to be less revealing, a common practice for Korean mobile games published internationally.

== Development ==
Shift Up was founded in December 2013 by Kim Hyung-tae, following his departure from NCSoft, where he served as the art director for Blade & Soul. In early 2014, Shift Up entered a publishing agreement with Line Games (then known as Next Floor). On December 16, 2015, the collaboration project was formally announced under the title Destiny Child, described as a gacha role-playing game.

Kim Hyung-tae served as both director and lead artist for the game. His signature character design aesthetic — featuring exaggerated proportions, intricate costumes, and expressive Live2D animations — became the game's most recognized feature and its primary commercial differentiator. The game's soundtrack was composed primarily by ESTi.

The game was originally published by Line Games. On October 20, 2019, Shift Up announced it would take over the operation of Destiny Child's Korean and overseas services from Line Games. For the Japanese market, Shift Up established a new subsidiary — Shift Up JP — in February 2020 to manage the local operation of the game.

== Release ==
Region	Platform	Release date
South Korea	Android, iOS	October 27, 2016
Japan	Android, iOS	November 24, 2017
Global (English)	Android, iOS	December 6, 2018

The global English release was accompanied by a pre-registration campaign that offered players exclusive in-game rewards. Upon release in South Korea, Destiny Child ranked first in sales on both the Google Play Store and Apple App Store.

On July 20, 2023, Shift Up CEO Kim Hyung-tae announced that Destiny Child would end service on September 21, 2023. The announcement cited the company's inability to maintain a sustainable service of adequate quality as the reason for discontinuation. Purchases of premium currency were suspended immediately upon the announcement, and a series of farewell events were implemented in the weeks leading up to the shutdown, including free premium packages, resource giveaways, and reruns of popular past events.

Shift Up simultaneously announced a "Memorial Update," released on September 22, 2023, which converted the game into an offline archival application. The Memorial app allows players who linked their account data before the shutdown to access the game's story chapters, cutscenes, and character information, though without any gameplay elements. An online Memorial Concert event was also held, featuring live performances of music from the game.

== Reception ==
Upon its South Korean release in October 2016, Destiny Child debuted at the top of the Google Play Store and Apple App Store sales charts in South Korea. The game was widely praised for the quality of its character artwork and Live2D animations, which were considered among the best in the mobile gacha genre. Kim Hyung-tae's art direction was frequently cited by reviewers as the game's standout quality.

Critical reception of the global release was mixed-to-positive. Reviewers praised the visual presentation, the depth of character stories, and the generosity of the free-to-play economy — particularly the frequency of in-game currency distribution and the daily free summon system. The game's combat system received more tempered reviews; critics noted that battles were largely automated, limiting direct player engagement in most game modes outside of competitive content.

== Legacy and sequel ==
Following the game's closure, South Korean game developer Com2Us announced in November 2024 that it had reached a licensing agreement with Shift Up to develop a new idle RPG based on the Destiny Child IP, to be produced by its subsidiary Tiki Taka Studio with a planned release in 2026.
