= Stellar Blade: Blood Rain =

Upcoming video game

- Developer: Shift Up
- Publisher: Shift Up
- Director: Kim Hyung-Tae
- Series: Stellar Blade
- Genres: Action-adventure, hack and slash
- Mode: Single-player

Stellar Blade: Blood Rain (Note: Stylized as Stellar Blade: BLOOD RAIN) is an upcoming action-adventure game developed and published by Shift Up. It is a direct sequel to Stellar Blade (2024). It was announced during Summer Game Fest 2026 with a reveal trailer. It will be self-published, unlike the first game which was published as a PlayStation title and later ported to PC. It follows the protagonist Evie, and is set sometime after the events of the first game. As of May 2026 the game was reported to still be in early stages of development.

== Gameplay ==
Blood Rain is a third person action adventure and hack n slash. The game features fast paced close quarters combat focused around punching enemies with a set of gauntlets. Later in the game more weapons and skills are unlocked, including a sword. Combat emphasizes quick timing for dodging and countering enemy attacks, as well as quick time events, similar to the first game. Similar to the first game, Evie will have a number of unlockable outfits.

== Synopsis ==
=== Setting ===
Stellar Blade: Blood Rain takes places in an apocalyptic sci-fi urban environment. Shift Up has teased a location based on Chongqing, China.

=== Plot ===
Evie (Note: Not to be confused with Eve from Stellar Blade.) is a member of a special force unit tasked with tracking down the group behind a terrorist attack on the city.

== Development ==
A sequel to Stellar Blade was teased shortly after the original game's release for the PlayStation 5, with Shift Up announcing plans to expand the game into a franchise in June 2024. Investor relations reports published in May 2025 further detailed an organization chart for the sequel's development team, planned to release sometime before 2027. In May 2026, Shift Up announced in an earnings presentation that it would be shifting away from publishing under PlayStation in favor of self-publishing for the sequel in order to "reach a broad global audience from day one". The game was officially announced under the title Stellar Blade: Blood Rain at the Summer Game Fest on June 5, 2026. In an interview published on March 6, 2026, game director Kim Hyung-Tae said the art direction was mostly finalized, but a lot more work was still needed on the second half of the story and depth of combat.
