= Kim Hyung-tae =

Kim Hyung-tae may refer to:

- Kim Hyung-tae (entrepreneur) (born 1978), South Korean founder of Shift Up
- Kim Hyung-tae (figure skater) (born 1997), South Korean pair skater
