= Eve (Stellar Blade) =

Fictional character in Stellar Blade

- Stellar Blade character
- Eve as depicted in her default outfit
- First game: Stellar Blade (2024)
- Created by: Kim Hyung Tae
- Voiced by: EN: Rebecca Hanssen; KO: Yoon Eun-Seo; JA: Asami Seto
- Portrayed by: Larissa Rochefort (promotion); Jade J (Switch 2 release commercial)

Eve (Korean: 이브, romanized: Ibeu), stylized as EVE, is a character introduced in and the protagonist of the 2024 video game Stellar Blade by developer Shift Up, and created by Kim Hyung Tae. Eve is a soldier sent from a space station called the Colony to help save mankind, who are fighting against creatures called Naytiba that have overrun Earth. She is voiced by Rebecca Hanssen in English, Asami Seto in Japanese, and Yoon Eun-Seo in Korean. Her body meanwhile was based on South Korean model Shin Jae-eun and later Yoon Seolhwa using 3D scans of their physiques.

Eve received mixed reception upon her debut, with some praising her as a character that would quickly become iconic in the same vein as similar female protagonists, while others criticized her as a bland character with little expressed personality. A significant part of discussion revolved around her sex appeal in the context of the male gaze but also the subject of her body being directly modeled from Shin Jae-eun, and how fair criticism was when that context was considered. In addition her character design and variety of outfits were also heavily discussed and examined in regards to her sex appeal and how they impacted her portrayal in the game.

== Conception and design ==
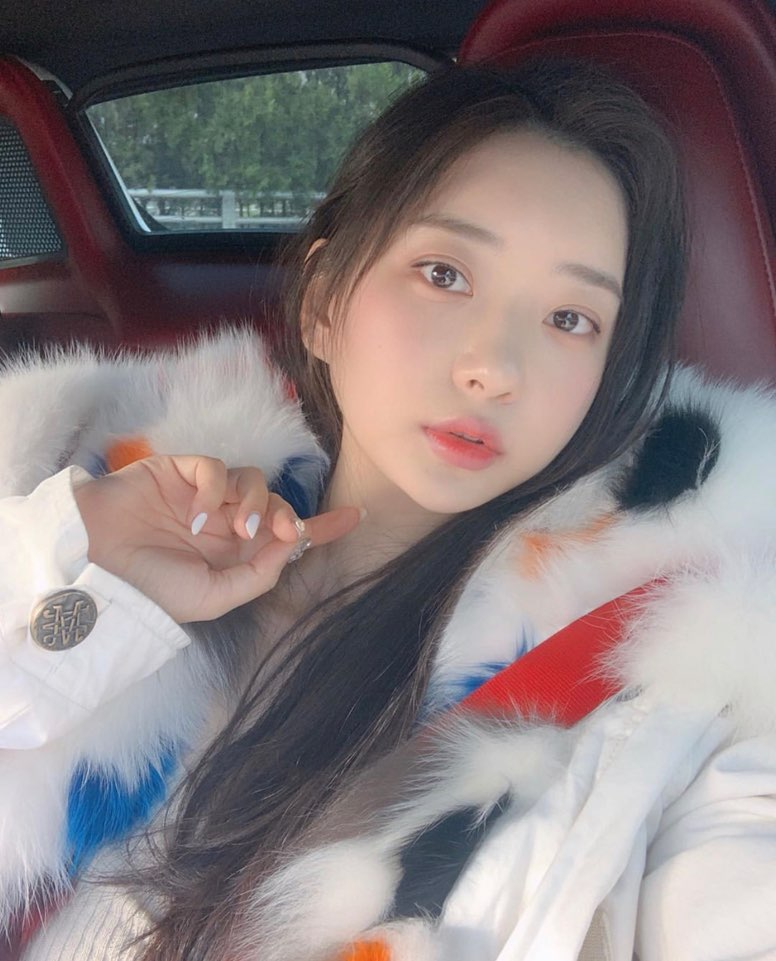
Shin Jae-eun served as one of the bodyscan models.

Eve was created by Stellar Blade lead Kim Hyung Tae in 2019 as the game's protagonist. Originally called "Eve 107", when designing her he wanted a character that reflected the style he had developed while working on his previous titles. While he wanted to ensure she didn't stand out too much from the game's world, her contrast with it at the same time was intended to create a sense of unease within the player. A variety of costumes for the character were additionally added for her to wear in-game to help bring out her "charm", while her animations were based on ballet and gymnastics to give her a different feel from male protagonists seen in other games. While her face was created by the development team, Eve's body is based on South Korean model Shin Jae-eun using 3D scans. When asked why they chose her specifically, Kim responded that while beauty was subjective, they wanted to create what they felt was "the most attractive looking body for the user". A later update for the game added additional outfits which utilized 3D scans of a second South Korean model, Yoon Seolhwa.

When developing her 3D model, the team focused attention to the back of her character model in particular, feeling it was "pretty important" due to it facing the character during most gameplay. Kim stated the emphasis on the character's beauty was a stylistic choice and not solely one for titillation, feeling that designing a purposefully glamorous character in the gaming environment at the time was "somewhat of a brave thing to be going for or attempting". He elaborated that in comparison to films, he felt video games were often scrutinized harsher by culture, with particularly harsh criticism towards "unrealistically beautiful characters". He added that when playing a game, he wanted to see a character "who is better-looking than myself", preferring something ideal over something "normal", adding that his work was "entertainment targeted for adults." To this end, he felt an ideal character was one that "can show their own charms and attractiveness without damaging the narrative or the setting of the game".

Her personality was designed to be harsher at the beginning of the game, "soldier-like" and showing little emotion or expression, but soften as the title progressed. He further expressed that when it came to the subject of her sexual appeal and using her sexuality as a weapon, Eve was unaware of "those charms that she possesses, so she's not that kind of character", though stated that may change with later installments. The developers stated that Eve's large costume selection was due to her fascination with outfits left behind on the surface of Earth, though chose not to state or demonstrate this part of her character in game.

Several pre-existing female video game characters influence her design, including Nier: Automata's 2B and P.N.03's Vanessa Z. Schneider, the latter of which inspired Eve's "action style" as well as her physical features. Prior to Stellar Blade's release, the character saw criticism in regards to how sexualized her appearance is. Kim argued that she was meant to be a character whose expression of beauty was developed with "little restrictions and no constraints", and a contrast to more "realistic" games in his view, feeling that it was fine for both character-design archetypes to coexist. He wanted to define Eve as a Korean woman, developed by Koreans and reflecting their own views on beauty, and to represent how their culture differed from other Asian cultures.

== Appearances ==
Eve was first introduced in the 2024 video game Stellar Blade. A soldier, she and her squad are deployed from the Colony space station to fight creatures called Naytiba that have overrun Earth and driven most of humanity from it. Eventually, she meets a survivor named Adam who leads her to Xion, humanity's last surviving city on Earth. Eve then makes contact with the elder Orcal and establishes relationships with the residents of Xion in order to further her mission to save humanity and reclaim Earth. Along the way she forms a friendship with the technician Lily, while some of the people Eve interacts with perceived her as an angel from Heaven meant to save them. Eve is voiced in English by Rebecca Hanssen, Asami Seto in Japanese, and Yoon Eun-Seo in Korean.

As the story progresses Eve discovers that the AI that sent her, Mother Sphere, has been lying and that instead of being human she comes from a race of androids called Andro-Eidos that were created by mankind alongside Mother Sphere. Mother Sphere waged war against humanity prior to the events of the game and forced humans underground, where they experimented on themselves and evolved into the Naytiba to fight back. As she encounters the Elder Naytiba that created the others, it's discovered to be Adam. He offers to merge with Eve to help recreate the human race, and the player is faced with a choice to accept or reject it.

If the offer is rejected, Eve fights Adam, who eventually transforms into a monster until defeated, and after which Eve and Lily return to the Colony. However, if she accepts his offer, after she absorbs Adam and changes into a new being, the Colony hijacks control of Lily's exosuit and attacks Eve. If Eve has reached maximum affinity during the course of the game Lily will survive her suit being destroyed, otherwise she dies. After the battle, the ending of the game shows Mother Sphere sending soldiers en masse against Eve. If Lily died in the previous encounter, the game ends upon this scene. However, if she survived, an additional scene shows the aftermath of Eve defeating all of them, and she returns to Xion with Lily to help revitalize the city.

In other games, Eve was added to Shift Up's mobile game Goddess of Victory: Nikke as part of a cross-promotion between the titles in 2025 alongside other characters from Stellar Blade. Alongside her regular appearance her skin suit outfit was also added, obtainable through the game's gacha system.

== Promotion and reception ==
To promote the character and game, Sony Entertainment hired cosplayers to portray the character at pre-release events in Singapore, Hong Kong and Taiwan. Life-size and 1/4 scale figures were also produced of Eve for the game's launch party, created by South Korean figure makers Cerberus Project and Frenchdoll. A character using Eve's likeness was later added to Sony's Astro Bot title as free downloadable content for the game. Several figures of Eve have been produced by companies such as JND Studios, Flare, and Good Smile as part of their Nendoroid product line. In 2026, as part of a crossover with the hero shooter game Overwatch, the character Widowmaker received a skin based on Eve. Meanwhile, PlayStation Asia partnered with cosplayer Larissa Rochefort to portray the character at the Stellar Blade's launch at an event in Jakarta, Indonesia, and model Jade J portrayed her in a live-action commercial produced for the Nintendo Switch release of the game.

Since her debut Eve has received mixed reception. Described by Automaton writer Taijiro Yamanaka as having "soft facial features, and a slender but shapely figure", he felt her appearance made her look "out of this world" against the game's post-apocalyptic setting, but at the same time was in line with Kim's previous character designs. One eSports writer Ron Muyot praised Shin Jae-eun's involvement with the character's design, feeling that she "breathed life" into Eve and made her "memorable and dynamic [...] poised to leave a lasting impact on players". Drew Swanson of Game Rant meanwhile discussed the similarities between Eve and Nier Automata's 2B, he discussed that while both were androids that were initially indifferent, their character growth's diverged in unique ways, praising how the revelation of her being a machine aided Eve's character growth alongside her concern for people that had come to see her as "an angel" helped distinguish her as her own character.

Ben Ossola of IGN France on the other hand was highly critical of her design, feeling that while other games had similar female protagonists, he felt by comparison Eve was "bland" and a "doll sexualized by someone you would think has never seen a woman." He further criticized aspects of her design: heels, hair, and body proportions, stating that "nothing works", and while he did praise her character movement as graceful, felt Shin Jae-eun's contributions to the design were lost under "layers of clumsy plastic modifications that make her unrecognizable, both in body and face." The statement received backlash, particularly from Kim Najung of Maxim Korea, who felt the criticism was another example of "political correctness". The article was later modified by the editorial staff of IGN's main branch, who apologized and stated they felt the phrasing was taken literally and meant no offense to Shift Up as a developer. As a result, the initial statement and the author's name were removed from the article.

Gene Park of the Washington Post meanwhile described her as "a woman born from South Korea's culture and philosophy", a "Korean coded" character defined by a narrow definition of beauty relative to that country. He expressed disdain for how some seemed to use her as an argument against character diversity in gaming, while also criticizing IGN France's initial comments towards her. In terms of personality, while he described her as "bland", he also felt it was by design and meant to represent a parable to the creation myth in Christian ideology, as she gains knowledge during the course of the game by reading books or interacting with others. He stated that while Stellar Blade as a game didn't make the strongest first impression in his eyes, Eve was able to establish her own distinguished identity, representing elements of Korean cyberpunk that like her is "beautiful in its own absurd way".

Josh Cotts and Game Rant meanwhile praised how Eve's personality was developed by several of the in-game mechanics, particularly through Eve's own rejection of side quests that may be offered to the player. While Cotts noted this could be argued as going against player agency, he emphasized the comments Eve makes as she does so, and felt it helped shine more light into her character's personality and was a particularly novel approach of doing so. Similarly, Drew Swanson for the same publication added that Eve's habit to collect unique canned drinks throughout the game not only helped flesh out the game's world and setting, but also acted as a source of character development as she bonds with Lily while gathering them.

=== In regards to sex appeal ===
While some criticized the emphasis on sex appeal, others such as Stacey Henley of TheGamer praised how her movements tied to it, citing her ladder descending "supermodel pose" as an example of portraying her as "effortlessly cool".

Inverse's Issy van der Velde cited University of Delaware academic Dr. Matt Denny on the subject of Eve and the male gaze. Denny argued that the use of Shin's body instead of that of an athlete or martial artist implied that her physical attributes were more important than her role as a performer to the development team. He further felt that it gave the implication that the developers just "want her from the neck down. It seems to be very much a statement of the parts of this woman that are of value." van der Velde meanwhile argued that her body was "both a site of empowerment and objectification depending on how we're invited to look at or through it", noting a contrast on how action scenes would focus on enemies and allow her to be a rapid moving blur, while cutscenes would often instead focus attention on her behind. He however acknowledged that there was appreciation for the character from various people, "men, women, nonbinary, straight, queer", who found her attractive. He added that while similar characters such as Lara Croft or Tifa Lockhart from previous games were also criticized for their appearance, they had other elements that helped elevate them into empowering figures such as a well-written personality and story, exciting gameplay, and other aspects that helped them "become more than the sum of their parts."

Stacey Henley of TheGamer initially argued in favor of the character, acknowledging that while the developer's statements could be seen negatively, they were not uncommon mentalities for developers of characters such as Bayonetta or Lollipop Chainsaw's Juliet Starling, female characters who are "empowered, and clearly attractive" female heroes who find strength in their sexuality and embrace "that part of who they are". She also noted that in the past the character Abby from The Last of Us Part II was defended against criticism about her body due to being based on a real-world person, and drew similarities to the complaints against Eve. She felt that the argument became that somehow certain female bodies were "unacceptable", and added that the mindset of celebrating all women "does mean all women, rather than cutting out the attractive or provocative ones". However, post-release Henley expressed her disappointment, stating that unlike those aforementioned characters Eve's lack of personality and acknowledgement of her own sex appeal made her essentially "tofu in a bikini" and too tame instead of the icon she and others had hoped would be. Instead she felt Eve was sexy for the sake of it, and putting on the airs of being a strong character rather than demonstrating it or supported by writing that compensated for her cold persona.

Jamal Michel of The New York Times also commented on the matter, and described Eve as "a litmus test for gamers" due how many critics were drawn to what they saw as a rejection of "leftist values" with the character due to her figure and revealing outfits. At the same time he noted how much of that same crowd turned against Shift Up when an internal decision was made to reduce the exposure of one said outfit, leading to claims of censorship and petitions to reverse the decision. Henley also observed how some fans were using Eve as a counterpoint to other character designs, treating it as the sole desired outcome and arguing that others such as Star Wars Outlaws' Kay Vess in particular were unwanted. Henley countered that while she liked Eve's design, not every character should look like her, and instead physical diversity meant more variety in body types rather than solely inclusivity, and at the same time allow for stronger writing and stories when attractiveness was not the primary focus. And if every character resembled Eve, the "lustre" would wear out quickly, and to her it felt more like the reaction by some using her as a bludgeon was "less like a celebration of how she is designed and more ownership of her as a sexual object".

=== Analysis of character design ===
Several discussions revolved around Eve's character design. GamesRadar+'s Austin Wood complained that several of her outfits and the overemphasis on her sex appeal felt at odds with the game's overall presentation, and how little it factored into her personality. However, he added at the same time he "quite enjoyed [the game] both despite and sometimes because of Eve's design". He explained that while her outfits were often jarring, he appreciated her core design, enjoying the subtle details and that she was not just "a walking trope built like a snake that swallowed some melons", and felt the game's best outfits were the ones that had enough material to "embellish and accentuate" her. Rachel Kaser of VentureBeat argued that the character's design wasn't "sexy enough", arguing that while sex appeal was as interesting a design element as any other to her, many of the outfits had design elements that clashed with that aesthetic. While she felt elements such as the body suit worked well, others that incorporated aspects such as neckties made other outfits lack coherence, stating "If you're going to be sexy, be sexy. None of this avant-garde fashion nonsense."

Discussion also revolved around Eve's outfit variety in-game, with Maxime Claudel of Numerama arguing that it emphasized the sexist nature of her design by presenting players with a "doll" to dress up, and the sexualized nature of many of them flew in what he perceived as progressive attitudes towards female characters in video games. In contrast, Levi Winslow of Kotaku praised this element instead, feeling that many of her outfits were well proportioned with good color variety, and helped make Eve "a style icon" emphasized by how she walked "around in heels like it's nothing". They additionally felt the variety was a boon to cosplayers, drawing comparison to similar fan reactions to 2B and Bayonetta's outfit options in their games. In a follow up article, Winslow analyzed how many of the outfits complimented Eve's figure, and expressed a preference for how the more detailed and covering options enhanced the character's beauty through encouraging the curiosity as to what was underneath, drawing a comparison between a design being stimulating and one being 'sexy' in the sense of being suggestive through elements such as see through fabric. In this manner they drew comparison to Playboy centerfolds "tease you with their bodies", and while Winslow didn't want to diminish one option over the other, argued for him blatant nudity would diminish her sex appeal, and added "She's already hot. Let the clothes create some intrigue."

Fans meanwhile took to a particular clothing option, the "Skin Suit", which covers Eve in a skintight two-toned beige bodysuit with various electronics atop it. Unlockable in the game's demo, the outfit is also the only one that can affect the character's gameplay, as her defensive capabilities are drastically lowered while using it. However, as a result players used it as a means to increase the game's difficulty as a viral challenge. Levi Winslow acknowledged how the outfit had gone viral on social media, stating that the reaction was not surprising despite the "beauty is pain" aspect, and compared it to 2B's skirt removing technique in Nier: Automata. Rachel Kaser on the other hand criticized its appearance, stating it would have been better to have shared Eve's skin color and that the "weird duo-colored tan pattern just makes it look like she spilled the wrong shade of foundation all over herself".

Den of Geek's Matthew Byrd noted that the developer's statements regarding the character drew some controversy, stating that some had found Eve and Kim's attitude "problematic and simply creepy", and were arguing that a fan service approach to character design was "regressive" in an environment where many game characters were criticized for not being "sexy enough". Rachel Ulatowski of The Mary Sue argued that the character's design wasn't an issue, but reactions to it from certain groups, particularly in her view conservatives, who called the character a return to "tradition" over a "woke" mentality in game design upon her reveal. However, she also called out Kim's statements, feeling that along with the above crowd, it painted Eve as the "only woman that men want to see" and further exasperated an issue with hyper-sexualization of video-game characters in the industry by "catering to misogynist men".
