= Vanessa Z. Schneider =

Video game character

- P.N.03 character
- Vanessa as she appears in P.N.03
- First game: P.N.03 (2003)
- Created by: Shinji Mikami
- Designed by: Kenichi Ueda (animation)
- Voiced by: Jennifer Hale

Vanessa Z. Schneider (Japanese: ヴァネッサ・Z・シュナイダー) is a character from the 2003 Capcom video game P.N.03. A mercenary working in space, she is tasked with destroying berserk robots, utilizing a high-tech bodysuit that allows her to fire energy blasts from her hands. By the end of the game, she realizes she's a clone. Created by game director Shinji Mikami, Vanessa was designed to be sexy with an emphasis on dancing, with animator Kenichi Ueda creating her animations by hand after studying the movements of female dancers. She is voiced by Jennifer Hale.

Vanessa was mostly well received, with much praise going towards both her sex appeal and her constant motion. Several outlets compared her to characters such as Lara Croft or Samus Aran, though acknowledged she was hampered due to P.N.03's GameCube exclusivity. Retrospectives further blamed the title's poorly received gameplay as weighing her down, and argued that in any other title the character would have become iconic. Despite this though, arguments have also been made that that very gameplay is in part why she is regarded as well, due to the character's human element.

== Conception and design ==
Early in P.N.03's development, game director Shinji Mikami was unsatisfied with how the title was progressing. Originally called "Robot War Game" as a placeholder, he considered that the concept itself was not the problem, but the lead character. He wanted to recapture the simplicity of games as produced on the Famicom, so he asked one of the designers to "create him a character design". When he asked the designer if she wanted to create a male or female character, she responded "Woman!", to which Mikami approved. As the character developed, Mikami wanted her name to represent a mix of cultures due to life aboard a space station in the future, with "Vanessa" being French, the "Z." middle name alluding to a British name, and "Schneider" being German. Game producer Hiroyuki Koboyashi meanwhile wanted the character to be a "cool and sexy mercenary with a tough exterior that hides her dark past".

Early on the character was intended to use traditional firearms, something Mikami really wanted to include in the game. However, they were unable to complete the animations for these weapons in time, and her attacks were changed to energy bolts coming from her hands instead. Vanessa's animations weren't done by utilizing motion capture, but were instead hand animated by Kenichi Ueda. They wanted to have the character fight as if she were dancing, with movements that were intended to be "stylish and rhythmic". These animations were done by heavily studying female dancers, with an emphasis on artistic motions. Her crouching animation in particular was meant to resemble a jaguar, taking inspiration from an early title for the game due to how "supple and athletic" Mikami perceived her to be.

In terms of character design, Vanessa is a woman with short brown hair and orange sunglasses, wearing a skintight black and white bodysuit that wraps around her body and connects to her spine. The suit in turn has a protrusion jutting from the back near the collar, where it stores large amounts of energy that can be fired through her gloves. A wide variety of different colored suits can also be unlocked during the course of gameplay, each having a unique "energy" attack. One particular suit, Papillon, is a black suit that leaves large amounts of skin exposed, revealing a butterfly tattoo on her lower right abdomen.

The development team grew quite attached to the character while creating the game, wanting to see her used in projects after P.N.03's release. Mikami himself noted similar sentiment, lamenting that he'd gotten "ahead of himself" when creating the game, and sees her as an "independent adult woman" when it comes to her appeal. While he acknowledged the character's emphasis on sex appeal, he felt there was a distinction between her design and works by other companies such as Dead or Alive, and felt there was importance in recognizing the line between tasteful and distasteful approaches to the subject. Koboyashi meanwhile during an E3 presentation for the game emphasized that significant work had gone to make the character sexy, namely in regards to her buttocks, stating that due to the game being in third person perspective and her back perpetually towards the camera "of course we have to focus on the important parts."

== Appearances ==
As introduced in P.N.03, Vanessa is a freelance mercenary working on colonized planets. She is contracted by a mysterious client to destroy Computerized Armament Management System (CAMS) robots that have gone berserk. Robots of this type had been responsible for killing Vanessa's parents. To combat the CAMS, Vanessa wears "Aegis suits", powered exoskeletons that connect to her spine and allow her to fire energy beams from her palms and to perform powerful attacks called "energy drives". After destroying the CAMS central core, Vanessa encounters a digital projection of the client, whose appearance is identical to her own. She speculates that she is a clone of the client, but the client counters that none of their memories may be real. Vanessa debates whether to continue her work as a mercenary.

The 30th Anniversary Capcom Character Encyclopedia shined more light on the game's story, establishing that Vanessa is indeed a clone and that the game's title, "Product Number 3", is a reference to her. Throughout the game the character has little spoken dialogue, and when she does she is voiced by Jennifer Hale, who portrayed Vanessa with a Teutonic accent.

== Promotion and reception ==
Emphasis was put into Vanessa's animations to ensure she maintained "rhythm", such as stamping her feet while idle or counting it off with her free hand when attacking.

Vanessa's image was used heavily in promoting P.N.03, both during its pre-release and in full-page ads afterward that emphasized her physical curves. Near the game's release, Capcom released a promotional wallpaper of the character as part of their mobile phone engagement program. For the 2011 video game Ultimate Marvel vs. Capcom 3, several skins for the character Jill Valentine took direct inspiration from Vanessa, namely from her default suit and the darker Intera Fusion variant.

Daniel Etherington in an article for BBC News compared her to characters such as Lara Croft and Samus Aran in terms of strong female characters in media and their appeal. However, he also pointed out that the character was held back by the game she was featured in, both due to its gameplay and exclusivity to the GameCube, stating "It is not like a developer can contrive to create an icon, but there is the definite possibility of cult appeal." The book Dangerous Curves meanwhile cited her as a positive example of female heroines in gaming that were becoming more prevalent in the wake of Lara Croft's success.

Edge praised the character as "one of the most sassy characters to emerge in some time", noting that while the character had little personality displayed, the emphasis on her dancing gave her and the game a significant amount of charm. The staff of Electronic Gaming Monthly was far more critical however, stating the character had less in common with Croft than it did shmup series Gradius due to the gameplay. They further added that a lack of variety in the character's appearance hampered her, noting that while she was off to a strong start due to moving with elegance and grace, "one truly badass character design is all P.N.03 has to offer. Gamers deserve more". Retro Gamer described her as "one of gaming's sexiest and overlooked heroines", adding that watching her was "a thing of beauty" and dubbing her a "sexy force of nature to be reckoned with."

Dave Halverson of Play magazine suggested that if Kobayashi had "set out to create the world's most beautiful female video game character, he has certainly succeeded", further describing her as "immeasurably more elegant than Lara Croft" as a character and a "celebration of the female form" that he felt only came from Japanese developers. He further stated her behind "sways with so much grace it borders on illegal", and described her as a "death ballerina" when using her Energy Drive attack. Other staff members of Play added that "the cybernetically enhanced beauty and gracefulness of Vanessa Z. Schneider has and likely never will be equaled", naming her one of the female female characters in console gaming and featuring her in several issues of their "Girls of Gaming" publication.

GamesRadar+ in particular also devoted several articles to the subject, describing her in 2012 as one of the "sexiest new characters" of the past decade, and stating that while in their view most female characters were designed to appeal to a typically male demographic, Vanessa intertwined "sex appeal and general mechanics into an inseparable cocktail of feminine artistry". They also shared Etherington's comparison to Lara Croft and Samus, stating that if P.N.03 had been a better game the character may have reached more iconic status to rival them, instead of just being "teeth-rotting eye candy." In later articles they described her design as a cross between "Victoria's Secret fall lineup and Iron Man's armor", but added "she is absolutely beautiful [...] one of the most gracefully designed characters in any game", and argued that Vanessa deserved a chance to succeed as a star in a much better game.

Jordan Mammo meanwhile in an article for Unwinnable Weekly voiced praise for Vanessa, stating that while in early previews it was easy to see her in the same light as characters like Lara Croft due to the emphasis on sex appeal and then-present firearms, in the game itself "she did something far more interesting: she danced". In his eyes this brought a creative spark to the game, and that the emphasis on her dancing and limitations of her gameplay helped illustrate Mikami's story about being human through "coming to grips with something as frequently frustrating as having a body".

Vanessa has also been discussed by other character designers in the gaming industry. Korean developer Kim Hyung-Tae, creative director of the game Stellar Blade, cited her as an inspiration for the "action style" of that game's protagonist, Eve. Character designer and freelance artist Tomoharu Saito meanwhile in an article for Japanese magazine Game Hihyou cited her as an example of the distinction between "being cool" and "trying to look cool" in a character's portrayal, with the latter seen as more negative, and how much visual appeal played into that factor. In his view, while elements such as her sunglasses could be seen as fitting into the negative aspect, her overall presentation was positive, particularly through her movement and how sexy it was to him and even the sunglasses gave her an air of "wanting to show off".

Analysis of other elements of her character were more varied. In a 2006 article, Edge praised the character's lack of dialogue, adding that "hips are her vocabulary, and that arrogant raised shoulder and endlessly tapping finger say far more than dialogue ever could", though expressed heavy disdain for the character's voice itself, stating "If any lead character ever reinforced Gordon Freeman's decision to go mute, it's Vanessa Schneider". They additionally felt that the character could be seen as a personification of the game's unforgiving style through her cold demeanor, but also its immensely wasted potential. Despite their glowing praise of the character, GamesRadar+ acknowledged the confusing nature of the character, stating that by the end of the game the only thing known for certain was "she can dance and shoot robots." This sentiment was shared by Josh Hsieh of Insert Credit. Going further, he described her as someone with "the typical proportions assigned to voluptuous videogame vixens, and stands in a posture that makes scoliosis look sexy", feeling that while the game focused on the gyration of her breasts and buttocks the allure was hampered by the presentation.
