= MagnaCarta 2 =

2009 video game

- European cover art, featuring protagonists Zephie (left) and Juto (right)
- Developer: Softmax
- Publisher: Namco Bandai Games (Note: Released under the Banpresto brand name outside North America.)
- Directors: Yeon-kyu Choi; Gramcat (Art); Kyung-jin Lee (Character); Sung-woon Jang (Sound/Music)
- Producers: Yoshihisa Kanesaka; Young-gee Cho; Toshihiro Nada (Executive); Young-won Jeong (Executive); Koji Kumakura (Senior)
- Designer: Kyung-jin Lee (character)
- Programmers: Kwang-sub Shin (Lead); Jack Porter (Engine); Chaitanya Munjuluri (Engine); Go-eun Kim (Engine); Ji-ho Lee (Battle)
- Artist: Kyung-jin Lee
- Writer: Tily
- Composer: Sung-woon Jang
- Series: Magna Carta
- Engine: Unreal Engine 3
- Platform: Xbox 360
- Release: KOR: August 6, 2009; JP: August 8, 2009; NA: October 13, 2009; EU: October 16, 2009; AU: October 28, 2009
- Genre: Role-playing video game
- Mode: Single-player

Magna Carta 2 (마그나카르타 2 Mageuna Kaleuta 2, マグナカルタ 2 Maguna Karuta 2) is a role-playing video game developed by South Korean developer Softmax and published by Namco Bandai Games exclusively for Xbox 360. It is a follow-up to the games Magna Carta: The Phantom of Avalanche released on Windows and Magna Carta: Crimson Stigmata released on the PlayStation 2. It was released in South Korea and Japan on August 6, 2009 and in North America on October 13, 2009. It marks the series' first entry onto a seventh generation console.

== Gameplay ==
In MagnaCarta 2, the player controls their characters from a third-person perspective, usually in one of two "Modes". In Movement Mode, the player explores the area, talks with other characters and interacts with the environment. In Combat Mode, the player character enters a battle stance, which lets them fight enemies at the cost of slower movement speed.

The game's battle system combines strategic turn-based and real-time elements and battles directly occur in the field, with no loading screens. Up to three active members can be in the field at any one time, with the remaining three members waiting to be switched in. The player can choose between using normal attacks or moves that use Kan, a type of energy. These Kan moves generate or use Kan. If all three active members' hit points reach zero, the game is over and the player restarts from their last save point.

As the player presses the attack button, their character's "Overdrive" gauge will fill up. Once full, the character will enter an "Overdrive" state, where their attack power is increased. However, once the player can no longer attack, their character will fall into an "Overheat" state, rendering them unable to attack until the gauge lowers enough for them to attack again. Players can use this gauge to their advantage by using "Chain Drives"—the process of Overdriving one character into Overheat, immediately switching to another character already present, then Overdriving them as well. This frees both members' Overdrive gauges, enabling both to attack without hindrance. Players can also use Solo and Co-op Techniques, which unleash devastating combination attacks on their target.

The player collects Kamonds to power-up weapons via their accompanying "Kamond Board". Kamonds are also used to strengthen characters and craft new items. Kamonds are usually obtained by defeating monsters or Sentinels, but can also be found in treasure chests or as rewards for finishing quests. At Kamond Shops, players can craft to turn Kamonds into new accessories. Recipes and money are needed to craft with Kamonds. Recipes are earned as rewards for completing certain quests.

== Story ==
The main cast of MagnaCarta 2. Top row: Juto (left), Zephie, and Argo. Bottom row: Crocell, Celestine, and Rue.

MagnaCarta 2 is set in the fictional kingdom of Lanzheim, divided by an ongoing civil war between the Northern Forces, led by the usurper Shuenzeit Baron; and the Southern Forces, led by Rzephilda "Zephie" Berlinette, the Princess of Lanzheim. In response to the Northern Forces' "Sentinels"—destructive, living weapons based on the extinct Carta race—Zephie forms the Counter-Sentinel Unit in order to turn the tide. However, while trying to find the Sentinels' weakness, Zephie's bodyguard Rue is captured by the Northern Forces. Zephie goes to rescue her friend: however, as they make their escape, they are intercepted by Schuenzeit's best soldier, Elgar the Regicide. Zephie takes Elgar's killing blow to Rue and despite what should have been a mortal wound, drives Elgar away.

Two years later, on Highwind Island, an ancient weapon similar to the Sentinels is discovered in the island's ancient ruins. Because of this, Juto—a young amnesiac with a fear of swords—soon encounters Zephie and Argo, who came to investigate the weapon for the Southern Forces. Learning that Northern Forces soldiers have arrived in the ruins and remembering that his adoptive sister, Melissa, had gone there earlier, Juto volunteers to guide the Counter-Sentinel Unit members to the ruins. Upon arrival, they find that the Northern Forces have activated the weapon. When the weapon injures Melissa, Juto single-handedly destroys the weapon in a berserker rage.

== Development and release ==
MagnaCarta 2 was developed by Softmax, the creator of Magna Carta: Tears of Blood. After developing Magna Carta: Tears of Blood, a team of 40 at Softmax partnered with Namco Bandai to create MagnaCarta 2 for the Xbox 360, using Unreal Engine 3. Development of MagnaCarta 2 began between 2004 and 2005, taking over 4 years to finish.

The game was officially unveiled in the April 2009 edition of Famitsu magazine. MagnaCarta 2 was announced at ChinaJoy in July 2009. It was released Japan 6 August 2009 and in South Korea on 28 August 2009.

== Reception ==
Reception

Aggregate score
Aggregator	Score
Metacritic	69/100

Review scores
Publication	Score
Edge	4/10
Famitsu	30/40 (X360) 29/40
Game Informer	8.25/10
GamePro	3.5/5
GameRevolution	B
GameSpot	6/10
GameTrailers	7.1/10
IGN	6.8/10
Official Xbox Magazine (US)	7.5/10
RPGamer	4.5/5
411Mania	6.8/10

The game received "average" reviews according to the review aggregation website Metacritic. IGN criticized the battle system stating, "this feels almost archaic and could have been run on a PS1, enemy AI is almost non-existent and character abilities are generic." Annette Gonzalez of Game Informer was more positive, citing that the "[b]attles are intuitive and addicting, although awkward camera angles can sometimes hinder combat"; and praising the voice cast, saying the fully voiced dialogue is a "vast improvement over Tears of Blood." In Japan, Famitsu gave it a score of 30 out of 40, while Famitsu Xbox 360 gave it one eight and three sevens for a total of 29 out of 40.
