= Capcom Five =

Five Capcom video games for GameCube

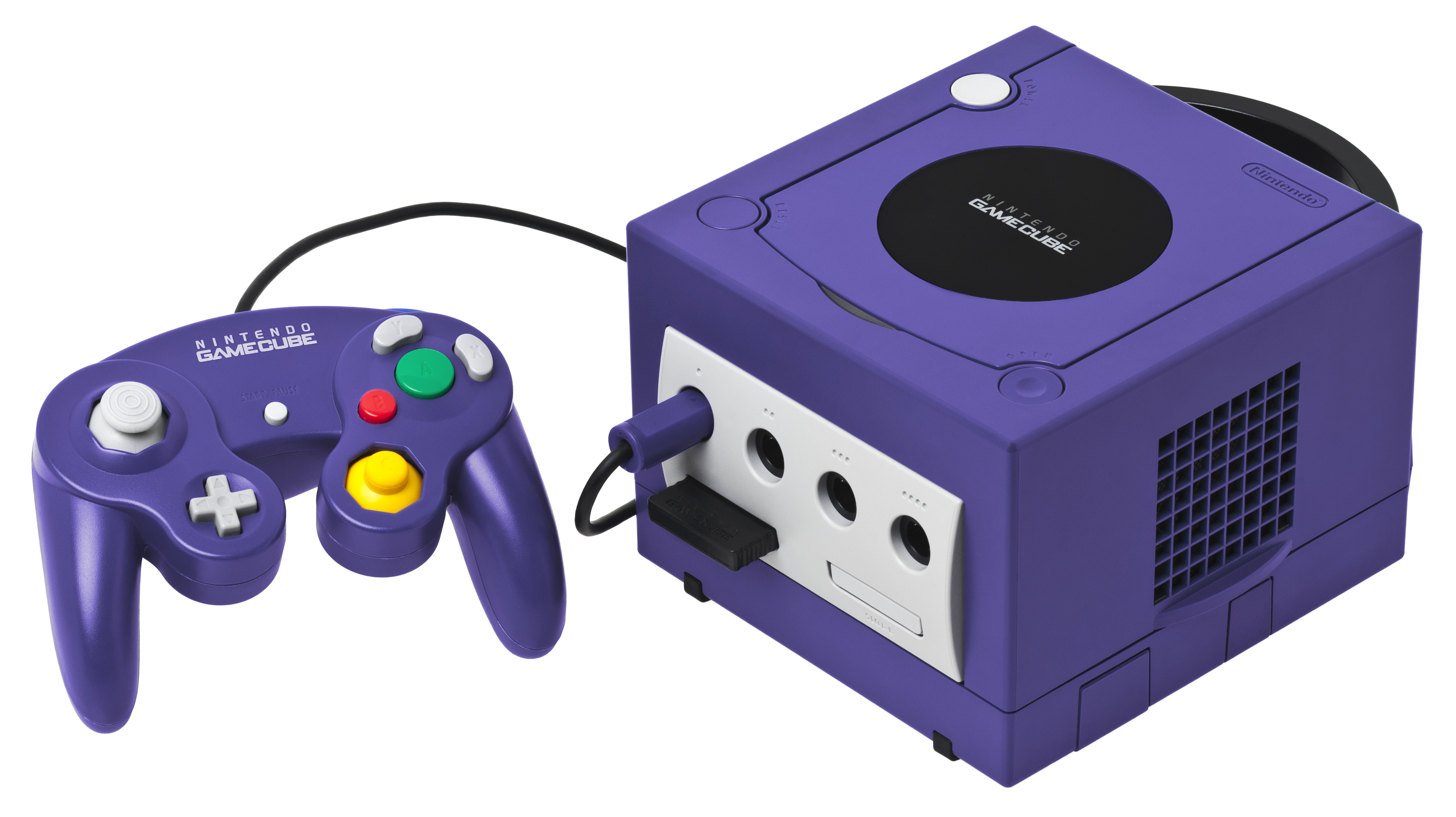
The Capcom Five, as originally announced, represented an unprecedented level of third-party developer support for the GameCube.

The Capcom Five are five video games that were unveiled by Capcom in late 2002 and published from March 2003. At a time when Nintendo's GameCube console had failed to capture market share, Capcom announced five new GameCube titles with the apparent goal of boosting hardware sales and demonstrating third-party developer support. Capcom USA followed up with confirmation that they would be exclusive to the GameCube. The five games were P.N.03, a futuristic third-person shooter; Viewtiful Joe, a side-scrolling action-platformer; Dead Phoenix, a shoot 'em up; Resident Evil 4, a survival horror third-person shooter; and Killer7, an action-adventure game with first-person shooter elements. Though not directly related to each other, they were all overseen by Resident Evil director Shinji Mikami and, except Killer7, developed by Capcom's Production Studio 4. Capcom USA later clarified that only Resident Evil 4 was intended to be exclusive; the initial announcement was due to a miscommunication with their parent company.

Of the five games, Dead Phoenix was canceled and only P.N.03 remained a GameCube exclusive. P.N.03 received mixed reviews and was a commercial failure, but is now considered a "cult classic". Both Viewtiful Joe and Killer7 sold modestly, the former despite critical acclaim and the latter owing to polarized reviews. Killer7 gained a significant cult following, effectively launching the career of director Suda51. Resident Evil 4 was the runaway success of the five, though its GameCube sales were undercut by the announcement of a PlayStation 2 port to be released later in 2005. Viewtiful Joe also saw a PlayStation 2 version with expanded features, and Killer7 debuted on multiple platforms simultaneously. Since the release of the Nintendo 64, Nintendo struggled to attract third-party developers like Capcom to produce games for its systems. Industry analysts see the Capcom Five case, particularly the loss of GameCube exclusivity for Resident Evil 4, as a major blow to Nintendo–Capcom relations and is emblematic of Nintendo's failure to attract third-party support during the GameCube era.

== Background ==
During the Nintendo Entertainment System (NES) and Super NES (SNES) eras, Nintendo and Capcom enjoyed a close relationship, with Mega Man as one of the NES' most prominent series. This closeness was partially due to Nintendo's monopoly of the video game console market, which allowed the company to compel third-party developers to release exclusive content according to Nintendo's schedule. Sega's rival Genesis system forced Nintendo to relax some of its restrictions on third parties with respect to the SNES. However, relations with third-party developers reached a turning point when Nintendo decided to retain a proprietary cartridge-based format for the Nintendo 64, in the face of Sony's disc-based PlayStation. Due to increased manufacturing costs and severely limited cartridge memory capacity, many third parties—Capcom included—moved to the PlayStation to start new series, such as Resident Evil. On this new platform, developers could create bigger games while avoiding the restriction of ordering expensive proprietary cartridges through Nintendo, which could lead to under- or overstocking inventory that might eat into profits. This third-party abandonment allowed the PlayStation to outsell the Nintendo 64 during that console generation.

"For the growth of the gaming industry. For GameCube. These words describe our initial thoughts. In an industry where you create to amuse and entertain, do you sense a crisis about the industry's continuing regression of excitement and new stimulation?
"We believe that the regression of excitement is solely the fault and responsibility of we creators. By the same token, we believe it is also our mission and responsibility to create something that is 'worth seeing' for the user.
"In a market that has become prosaic with character dependent games and sequel games, we would like to take this opportunity to announce five new and exciting games for GameCube."

— Capcom's website

With the GameCube, Nintendo tried to reclaim third-party developers and catch up to Sony's PlayStation 2 by featuring disc-based media and powerful system hardware. However, within the first year of launch, Nintendo sold only 4.7 million consoles. In this climate of flagging sales, Capcom held a surprise press conference in Japan in November 2002, announcing five new titles for the GameCube: P.N.03, Viewtiful Joe, Dead Phoenix, Resident Evil 4, and Killer7. The games would be developed in-house by Capcom's Production Studio 4 with Resident Evil director Shinji Mikami as supervisor. The lone exception was Killer7, to be produced at Grasshopper Manufacture, with Mikami as co-writer alongside director Suda51. When pressed for comment on console exclusivity, a Capcom USA representative confirmed the claim, generating the perception that Capcom was hoping to boost the GameCube's sales and reputation. A statement on their website echoed this support for GameCube. However, Capcom USA soon rescinded their confirmation, blaming it on a miscommunication with the parent company. They clarified that only Resident Evil 4 would definitely be exclusive.

== Release and reception ==
Aggregate review scores
Game	Year	Metacritic
P.N.03	2003	63/100
Viewtiful Joe	2003	93/100
Resident Evil 4	2005	96/100
Killer7	2005	74/100

=== P.N.03 ===
P.N.03 is a science fiction-themed third-person shooter, released in Japan on March 27, 2003. The game features a dexterous protagonist named Vanessa Z. Schneider who battles an army of maverick robots. The game earned the name Jaguar during development due to Vanessa's fluid motions and agility. Acting as director, Mikami attempted to differentiate it from Devil May Cry by adding defensive and evasive maneuvers. This desire, combined with the limited development time, also led to the replacement of Vanessa's guns with energy bolts. Upon its release, many reviewers criticized the game's short length and controls, although others praised the game as an old-school high-score arcade shooter that requires mastery and patience through multiple replays. Some contemporary critics were aware of the nicheness of P.N.03; Daniel Etherington from BBC Technology News summarized that "[P.N.03] probably will not have mass-market appeal despite its quality" as "a hectic shoot-em-up with a fiddly control system, appearing only on GameCube...but there is the definite possibility of cult appeal". It received an average score of 63 out of 100 on Metacritic. Mikami was unsatisfied with the finished product, stating he had hoped to put "a lot more" time into its development. Despite its commercial failure, reviewers have called P.N.03 a "cult classic". P.N.03 was the only game of the five that remained a GameCube exclusive.

=== Viewtiful Joe ===
Viewtiful Joe is a 2.5D side-scrolling action-platformer, debuted in Japan on June 26, 2003. The title character is a parody of tokusatsu superheroes and is trying to save his girlfriend, who has been trapped in "Movieland" by a group of supervillains known as Jadow. To complete his quest, Joe must use his Viewtiful Effects Powers, which are based on camera tricks and special effects used in films. These include "Slow", which simulates bullet time; "Mach Speed", allowing Joe to attack all enemies with his afterimages; and "Zoom In", which triggers a camera close-up and unlocks special attacks. Internally, Capcom treated the game as a "staff-focused project" with the goal of increasing the skills of director Hideki Kamiya. The game achieved a Metacritic score of 93 and won GameCube Game of the Year awards from numerous publications including IGN, GMR, and USA Today. The game sold out its initial shipment of 100,000 to achieve a lifetime total of 275,000 units. Producer Atsushi Inaba considered the game a success, achieving his goals of training staff, keeping a small budget, and selling well. However, these numbers were lower than Capcom expected, prompting the publisher to port Viewtiful Joe to PlayStation 2 in 2004, with expanded features. This version sold 46,000 copies with a slightly lower Metacritic score of 90 owing to the lack of progressive scan and frame rate slowdown generated by the porting process.

=== Dead Phoenix ===
A winged man fights a large demon in one of the few screenshots of Dead Phoenix.

Dead Phoenix was going to be a 3D shoot 'em up featuring a winged man named Phoenix. Based on trailer footage, IGN compared the gameplay to Panzer Dragoon. Players would take control of a winged man as he flies around shooting massive enemies, with the aid of allies on foot. Capcom's announcement described the setting as a mythical floating city, full of monsters and dragons. Game Informer announced that a Japanese release was planned for mid-2003. The game was believed to be canceled by May 2003, but Capcom stated at a press conference prior to the 2003 Electronic Entertainment Expo (E3) that it was still in development. IGN speculated that the game may have been retooled as a new Kid Icarus title, based on Nintendo's trend in the early 2000s of licensing properties to third parties. It was canceled in August 2003 after failing to appear at E3.

=== Resident Evil 4 ===
Resident Evil 4, a survival horror third-person shooter, had its North American premiere on January 11, 2005, and its Japanese release on January 27. Players take on the role of Leon S. Kennedy, a United States Secret Service agent who has been ordered to rescue the daughter of the President of the United States from a cult in rural Spain. The cult has been using a mind-controlling parasite to turn local villagers into violent drones. The game went through numerous changes during its long development—the team created and discarded four prototypes before settling on the final product. Among these was a version directed by Hideki Kamiya that would be turned into the first Devil May Cry game. Taking over directorial duties, Mikami made the fifth and final version very different compared to previous Resident Evil games, with an over-the-shoulder camera perspective and an increased emphasis on action and combat. Resident Evil 4 was the only game of the five to remain confirmed as a GameCube exclusive; Mikami claimed that he would "cut his own head off" (a Japanese colloquialism for quitting his job) if it were to be released on another platform. However, just two months before the game's January 2005 release, Capcom revealed that a PlayStation 2 port would be published nine months after the GameCube version in response to pressure from users and shareholders. This surprise announcement undercut the title's GameCube sales, which totaled 1.6 million, compared to the sales of the PlayStation 2 version, which exceeded 2 million. Mikami apologized to GameCube fans for failing to uphold his promise of console exclusivity. Despite these corporate conflicts, the game received an overwhelmingly positive critical response with Metacritic scores of 96 for both versions. It went on to sweep many Game of the Year awards for 2005 and is consistently listed among the greatest games of all time.

=== Killer7 ===
Killer7, released in Japan on June 9, 2005, is an action-adventure game with first-person shooter elements and an unconventional "on rails" control scheme. Unlike other members of the five, Killer7 was developed at Grasshopper Manufacture under the direction of Suda51. Players control the members of an elite group of assassins who are actually physical manifestations of a god-like being named Harman Smith. The game restricts the player's movement to specific branching paths through the environment and combat is only available while stationary in first-person view. This stripped-down control scheme was implemented as a deconstruction of conventional control mechanics. Gameplay was not finalized until late in development as Suda51 concentrated most resources on story and visual work. This back-loading of development resulted in several delays, the last of which was due to an artistic desire to release the game on July 7 (7/7) in North America. Killer7 debuted as a multi-console release, the only one of the five to do so, to polarized reviews. Some reviewers praised the game for its complex noir plot involving a political conflict between Japan and the US, while others panned it as confusing and incomprehensible. Similarly, the control scheme had both critics and proponents, the latter comparing it to Myst, Snatcher, and other "old-school" adventure games. Although it received a lukewarm 74 Metacritic score, Killer7 was honored by many video game publications in their year-end awards. Common nominations included "Best Story", "Best Artistic Design", and "Most Innovative Design". However, the central theme was a recognition of Killer7's status as a cult game with limited appeal. IGN named it "Best Game No One Played" and Kristan Reed of Eurogamer called it "a concept game, an arthouse game, a simple game, an often beautiful game, but most certainly never an everyman's game".

== Legacy ==
Release timeline
2003	P.N.03
2003	Viewtiful Joe
2004
2005	Resident Evil 4
2005	Killer7

The Capcom Five announcement came at a time when Nintendo had been struggling with its new console, with the apparent goal of supporting the fledgling system. However, each successive game's release reinforced Capcom's view that the GameCube was unprofitable; they ported the games one-by-one to Sony's PlayStation 2. Ultimately, four games were released and only one remained exclusive to GameCube. This lone GameCube exclusive was P.N.03 and not Resident Evil 4, as Capcom had repeatedly emphasized in press releases. GameCube owners and Nintendo fans were disappointed by the Capcom Five's failure to improve the GameCube's reputation and sales. Luke Plunkett of Kotaku noted that despite best intentions, Capcom's five even at their full potential could not have made up for the GameCube's failings in that generation's console wars. The dramatic reversal of the five is representative of the attitudes of third-party developers toward Nintendo's platform.

Capcom discovered a few business principles through their experience with development and release of the five. The first was to focus on multi-platform releases. Second, Capcom needed to streamline development. Prior to the five, the company had announced expected losses of US$103 million for fiscal year 2002, largely due to poor sales and extended development times, and ultimately posted over US$163 million in losses. Resident Evil 4 was a case in point, beginning development in 1999 and going through four discarded versions by the time of its 2005 release. The third lesson was to promote existing franchises rather than create new ones; Resident Evil 4 was the only unmitigated commercial success of the five and also the only game based on an existing property. To wit, Viewtiful Joe 2 started development shortly after the release of Viewtiful Joe and was completed just a year later. However, the brisk schedule meant that the team was not given time to implement all the features they had wanted, including a cooperative gameplay mode. Viewtiful Joe 2 debuted on both GameCube and PlayStation 2 to reach a wider audience and maximize profitability.

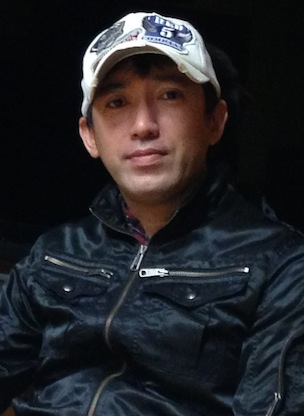
Shinji Mikami left Capcom in 2006 after the company closed Clover Studio, which developed Viewtiful Joe 2.

To facilitate Viewtiful Joe 2's development, Capcom turned "Team Viewtiful" into Clover Studio, a semi-autonomous production company with a focus on developing new intellectual properties (IPs). The separation was in part due to Resident Evil 4's PlayStation 2 release, which caused significant tensions between Capcom and Mikami, who had touted the game's console exclusivity. However, the studio only produced two new IPs before Capcom closed it in late 2006, following the resignations of Atsushi Inaba, Hideki Kamiya, and Shinji Mikami. These resignations were part of a series of high-profile departures from Capcom, including Yoshiki Okamoto in 2003 and Keiji Inafune in 2010. The former Clover developers charged that Capcom's corporate management was reluctant or actively opposed to risky new ideas, a complaint shared by Inafune. They would go on to found PlatinumGames with members of their old studio. In 2008, they announced the "Platinum Three", referring to MadWorld, Infinite Space, and Bayonetta, which would attempt to carry on the Capcom Five's ambitious and creative original spirit.

Outside of Capcom, Killer7 served as a turning point for Suda51 and his studio, Grasshopper Manufacture, effectively launching his career. With Capcom as publisher, Killer7 was his first game to be released outside Japan. While its sales were not up to Capcom's standards, the game's cult success encouraged the director to remake two of his older Japan-only games, The Silver Case and Flower, Sun, and Rain, for Western release. It also allowed his next major title, No More Heroes, to be released to critical and commercial success. The game also cemented Suda51's status as an auteur video game director. He would later work with Shinji Mikami again on Shadows of the Damned.

Despite the relative failure of the project as a whole, the individual games of the Capcom Five had a lasting impact on game design. After experimenting with action gameplay in P.N.03, Mikami was able to apply his experience to Vanquish, which serves as an evolution and refinement of the former's gameplay. Reviewers have also called P.N.03's "combat...with stylish dance-inspired movements" and "flashy, energetic, intense" gameplay and character design a spiritual predecessor to Bayonetta. On the other hand, Adam Sorice of Nintendojo suggested that the commercial failure of the game which so prominently featured a female lead character made Capcom reluctant to attempt it again for a number of years. Beyond its critical success, Resident Evil 4 became one of the most influential games of the decade. Its "over-the-shoulder" perspective inspired third-person shooters and action games as diverse as Gears of War and Batman: Arkham Asylum. Leon's precision-aiming laser sight has also found its way into Dead Space and Grand Theft Auto, as an alternative to "lock-on" targeting. On a broader scale, Resident Evil 4 deconstructed the survival horror conventions that the first Resident Evil games established. Some reviewers accused the game of abandoning the genre's essence by adopting an increased emphasis on action and combat. Following Resident Evil 4's lead, many "horror" games in the next few years would shift toward more combat-focused gameplay, including Silent Hill: Homecoming and Alone in the Dark.

According to industry sources, Capcom's reversal on GameCube exclusivity, particularly with Resident Evil 4, was a betrayal that soured relations between Capcom and Nintendo for several years. After this early pulling of Capcom support, the GameCube went on to sell 22 million units, less than the Nintendo 64's 33 million units and only a fraction of the PlayStation 2's 155 million units. Though Resident Evil 4 was eventually ported to Nintendo's Wii in 2007, it also received a high-definition re-release for PlayStation 3 and Xbox 360 in 2011. The 2002 GameCube remake of Resident Evil and Resident Evil Zero also received remasters for newer consoles in 2014 and 2016, respectively. Super Smash Bros. Brawl was released in 2008, featuring third party characters like Solid Snake from Konami and Sonic the Hedgehog from Sega as a selling point. Kotaku reported on a rumor that Nintendo refused to include a character from Capcom as a direct result of Resident Evil 4's multi-platform release. Years later, Capcom's own Mega Man and Ryu appeared as playable characters in the next game in the series, Super Smash Bros. for Nintendo 3DS and Wii U, with both returning for Super Smash Bros. Ultimate along with the debut of Ken Masters.

Ultimately, the GameCube failed to reinvigorate flagging support from third parties, a trend continued from the Nintendo 64 through its successors, the Wii and Wii U. The Wii had mostly relied on first-party titles to sell systems until 2009 when in-house development could not keep up with demand for new material. This caused sales to drop and prompted a shift toward more aggressive courting of third-party developers. Despite this, the Wii would go on to become one of the most commercially successful home video game consoles of all time. For the Wii U and Nintendo 3DS, Nintendo attempted to recruit outside developers early on to avoid a repeat of what happened to the Wii and reclaim the third-party support it enjoyed in the NES and SNES eras, though low Wii U sales resulted in continued poor third-party support until the launch of the Nintendo Switch in 2017.
