= Stellar Blade =

2024 video game

- Developer: Shift Up (Note: Additional work and development support by PlayStation Studios XDev and Virtuos)
- Publishers: PlayStation 5, Microsoft Windows; Sony Interactive Entertainment; Nintendo Switch 2 Shift Up (Note: Physical version published by PM Studios)
- Director: Kim Hyung-tae
- Producers: Kim Hyung-tae; Edward Saito; Junho Lee; Kazuma Kizuka
- Designers: Kim Hyung-tae; Lee Chang-min; Jang Hee-cheol
- Composers: Shift Up; Oliver Good; Keita Inoue
- Engine: Unreal Engine 4
- Platforms: PlayStation 5; Windows; Nintendo Switch 2
- Release: PlayStation 5; April 26, 2024; Windows; June 11, 2025; Nintendo Switch 2; November 5, 2026
- Genres: Action-adventure, Soulslike
- Mode: Single-player

Stellar Blade (Korean: 스텔라 블레이드) is a 2024 action-adventure game developed by Shift Up. Players take control of the protagonist, Eve, as she embarks on a mission to save humanity from a relentless war against an alien race known as the Naytibas in a distant future. Throughout her journey, Eve is joined by her squad and other survivors as they fight to reclaim Earth.

Shift Up, a Korean studio founded by Kim Hyung-tae, first teased the game in 2019 under the working title Project Eve. By 2021, it was announced as a PlayStation 5 exclusive, to be published by Sony Interactive Entertainment. In 2022, the game was officially named Stellar Blade.

After being delayed from its original 2023 release, Stellar Blade was launched for the PlayStation 5 on April 26, 2024. A Windows version was released on June 11, 2025, and a Nintendo Switch 2 version was released on November 5, 2026. The game received positive reviews from critics, who praised its visuals and combat, though some criticism was aimed at the story. By June 2025, it had sold over three million units. A sequel, Stellar Blade: Blood Rain, is in development.

== Gameplay ==
Stellar Blade is an action-adventure video game set on a post-apocalyptic Earth, played from a third-person perspective. The combat system emphasizes understanding enemy attack patterns and countering them with precise timing. Eve's Beta Gauge fills as players successfully parry and evade in combat. The Beta Gauge can be used for skills like piercing super armor and interrupting enemy combos. Eve also possesses a Burst Gauge, which fills through successive parries and combos, allowing players to activate buffs and execute powerful attacks. The game makes use of the PlayStation 5's DualSense controller, utilizing its haptic feedback to enhance the feel of enemy attacks and weapon accuracy. Exploration mechanics include wall scaling and rope swinging to traverse the environment, with rewards like extra costumes to be found. The overworld is populated with NPCs who offer side quests, which the player can choose to accept or ignore.

== Synopsis ==
=== Premise ===
Stellar Blade takes place in a post-apocalyptic world set on Earth. At the start of the 22nd century, the scientist Raphael Marks created Mother Sphere, an artificial intelligence made to advance the human race. Through her efforts, humans are able to undergo rapid biotechnological and nanotechnical evolution. However, the arrival of monstrous creatures called Naytibas threatens humanity, and ultimately humans lost the war against the Naytibas. Forced to abandon Earth, the remaining humans find sanctuary in outer space in a place called the Colony with Mother Sphere as their leader. In an effort to reclaim their home, the Colony periodically sends out squadrons of elite soldiers to continue their fight against the Naytibas. Eve, an elite soldier from the 7th Airborne Squad, is deployed to Earth in their most recent attempt. Along the way, Eve encounters two survivors, Adam and Lily, and eventually settles in Xion, the last surviving human city on Earth. Eve then establishes contact with Xion's leader, Orcal, and begins forming relationships with the residents of Xion, all in pursuit of her mission to save humanity and reclaim Earth.

=== Plot ===
The Colony deploys the 7th Airborne Squad in its latest attempt to liberate Earth, with orders to eliminate Alpha Naytibas as well as locate the Elder Naytiba, leader of the Naytibas. However, the operation ends disastrously; Eve becomes the sole survivor after her squadron is all but eliminated, including her commander Tachy, who is seemingly killed by an unidentified Alpha Naytiba. Eve is rescued by Adam, a human scavenger who was left behind on Earth. He enlists Eve's help in recovering a Hyper Cell power source from a ruined megacity, one of many abandoned after humanity's exodus. Eve retrieves the Hyper Cell and also succeeds in killing an Alpha Naytiba, taking its Alpha Core in the process. She then encounters and rescues Lily, a survivor from the 5th Airborne Squad, who decides to join Eve as her engineering support.

Adam takes them both to Xion, the last human city on Earth. He leads them to the city's leader, Orcal, who explains to Eve that in order to find the Elder Naytiba she will need the Master Core, which requires a total of four Alpha Cores to make. He offers to guide her to the locations of other Alpha Naytibas and thus their Alpha Cores, but requests her help retrieving additional Hyper Cells; Adam explains that Xion's energy supply is dwindling and that most of the city's residents are hibernating via cryostasis as a result. Eve agrees to help Xion as part of completing her mission.

Eve leaves for the research facility Altess Levoire to retrieve the second Hyper Cell. There, she discovers it is infested with Naytibas, but notes that these Naytibas appear more human-like than previous ones she encountered. She also discovers the first of a series of recordings left behind by Raven, a member of the 2nd Airborne Squad, each chronicling Raven's findings regarding the war against the Naytibas. Eve delivers the Hyper Cell back to Xion and is led to the next Alpha Naytiba. She eventually finds another of Raven's recordings but shortly after encounters the Alpha Naytiba; to her horror, the Alpha Naytiba is revealed to be Tachy, who survived but was subsequently contaminated. After killing her and retrieving her Alpha Core, Eve is directed to another research facility Abyss Levoire for the next Hyper Cell. She finds yet another recording left by Raven, and Raven's findings culminate in a shocking revelation—Eve and others who believed themselves to be humans are actually Andro-Eidos, synthetic humans created by Mother Sphere to eradicate and replace the human race, and that the Naytibas Eve encountered are what became of the real humans in their attempt to evolve and combat the Andro-Eidos. Upon returning with the third Hyper Cell, Orcal verifies these findings, but despite her doubts Eve remains determined in completing her mission.

Eve is then informed the next Alpha Naytiba is actually located in outer space and that she must use the orbit elevator to reach it. While journeying to the elevator, Adam receives troubling news from Xion and departs the group, leaving Eve and Lily to go on without him. Eve manages to defeat the Alpha Naytiba but fails to retrieve its Alpha core, nearly dying in the process. The Colony dispatches an armored exosuit at Lily's behest, which she uses to rescue Eve and safely return to Earth. Empty-handed, the two return to Xion but discover it under attack by the same unidentified Alpha Naytiba that had attacked Eve and Tachy. After Eve defeats it and retrieves its Alpha Core, it is revealed that the Alpha Naytiba's true identity is Raven, who manages to escape. Eve then finds a dying Orcal, now revealed to also be an Alpha Naytiba as well as the first Naytiba/Andro-Eido hybrid. With only three of the four Alpha Cores in Eve's possession, Orcal sacrifices himself and gives up his own Alpha Core so that Eve can finally create the Master Core.

Eve and Lily depart Xion to search for Adam, tracking his last-known location to the Elder Naytiba's nest. At the nest's entrance, they are confronted by Raven, who scoffs them for their blind devotion to Mother Sphere despite knowing the truth, and she is ultimately defeated by Eve. With the Master Core in hand, Eve and Lily proceed inside and manage to find Adam, who reveals his true identity as both the Elder Naytiba as well as Raphael Marks, the scientist who created Mother Sphere. Adam expresses deep regret for how his actions have caused humanity's downfall, and further explains that, in addition to Naytibas and Andro-Eidos being unable to coexist, neither species will ever be true successors to the human race due to their respective biological flaws. He then explains his plan to ensure humanity's future by creating a new type of human being, one made by fusing himself with Eve, and asks her to join him.

- If Eve refuses Adam's plan, the two are forced to battle, with Eve ultimately prevailing. Adam dies along with the last hope for humanity, and Mother Sphere welcomes Eve and Lily back to the Colony now that their mission is complete.
- If Eve accepts, the two fuse together and Eve emerges as a new Naytiba/Andro-Eidos hybrid. However, Lily loses control of her armored exosuit after it received a Colony-directed command to eliminate Eve. Eve is forced to defend herself, and depending on her affection with Lily, Lily either dies or survives as a result of the ensuing fight. Regardless of Lily's fate, Eve will be greeted by Mother Sphere outside the nest. With no further use for her, Mother Sphere dispatches an army to eliminate Eve, and the game ends with Eve fighting against an endless horde of Andro-Eidos soldiers.
  - If Eve had achieved maximum affection with Lily, Lily manages to eject herself from the armored exosuit before Eve destroys it. In a post-credits scene, it is shown that Eve manages to completely annihilate the army sent after her, and Lily uses the fourth and final Hyper Cell she received from Adam to fully restore Xion.

== Development ==
On April 4, 2019, the Korean studio Shift Up (founded by Blade & Soul illustrator Kim Hyung Tae) announced Project Eve for PlayStation 4, Windows, and Xbox One. The game was set to be developed using Unreal Engine 4. A prototype showcasing new gameplay and art direction was presented in late 2020, but the game's release platforms were not mentioned. In the September 2021 PlayStation Showcase, the game was announced as an exclusive for PlayStation 5 and would be published by Sony Interactive Entertainment.

In a September 2022 PlayStation State of Play, the game's final title was revealed to be Stellar Blade, accompanied by new gameplay footage and an original release window scheduled for 2023. The next day, MONACA announced their involvement, stating that their members, Oliver Good and Keita Inoue, are participating in the music production of the game, which has been reiterated multiple times prior to release. The game uses 3D scanning for some character models, with Eve being based on the model Shin Jae-eun. The Naytiba enemies were designed by Korean movie monster designer Hee-Cheol Jang, who created clay models that were then 3D scanned to produce the game's 3D models. In December 2023, the game was delayed to 2024.

== Release ==
In a January 2024 State of Play, it was announced that the game would be released on April 26. A demo of the game was released on the PlayStation Store worldwide on March 29, 2024, but it was accidentally published early in the United States on March 8 and was quickly removed. An update for the game adding support for enhanced visual fidelity and higher framerates on the PlayStation 5 Pro was released on October 22, 2024. On November 19, 2024, photo mode was added to coincide with the release of collaboration DLC with Nier: Automata. A free Christmas-themed update added new cosmetics and minigames on December 17, 2024. On June 11, 2025, a Windows version of the game was released, to coincide with the release of collaboration DLC with Goddess of Victory: Nikke, another IP of Shift Up. The official release on Windows was preceded by a demo version on May 30, 2025.

In May 2025, Shift Up officially announced that a sequel to Stellar Blade is in development. In June 2026, Shift Up announced it would bring Stellar Blade to the Switch 2 within the same year.

== Reception ==
=== Critical reception ===
Reception

Aggregate scores
Aggregator	Score
Metacritic	81/100
OpenCritic	81% recommend 79% recommend(Complete Edition) (Note: Based on 19 reviews.)

Review scores
Publication	Score
4Players	84/100
Destructoid	8/10
Eurogamer	4/5
Famitsu	35/40
Game Informer	8.75/10
GameSpot	8/10
IGN	7/10
Jeuxvideo.com	17/20
PCMag	4.5/5
Shacknews	8/10
Video Games Chronicle	4/5

Stellar Blade received "generally favorable" reviews from critics, according to the review aggregator website Metacritic, based on 136 critic reviews. On OpenCritic, 81% of 167 critic reviews recommend the game. Much of the initial reception addressed existing online discourse around the character Eve leading up to Stellar Blade's release, with several critics questioning the validity of the discourse and how it overshadowed the quality and other aspects of the game.

Benjamin Schmädig of Eurogamer.de gave Stellar Blade a 5 out of 5, describing Stellar Blade as "an adventure that scores with motivating level design as well as its sophisticated combat system and furious boss duels. And that, despite its minor weaknesses, completely captivated me both in terms of gameplay and narrative." Matt Miller of Game Informer gave the game an 8.75 out of 10, stating Stellar Blade is "unabashed in its titillating approach to sex and violence, but unlike so many games that use those appeals as a crutch, it's also a top-notch action experience that can easily stand with the big girls."

Imran Khan of GameSpot and Katcy Stephan of Variety both gave Stellar Blade an 8 out of 10, with Khan stating "a strong battle system and exciting moments make Stellar Blade more than just an imitator" and Stephan concluding "whether you're considering 'Stellar Blade' for its buxom hero or its blisteringly frenetic combat, this is one stylish and well-polished game that's certainly worth your attention." Connor Makar of VG247 described Stellar Blade as a "pleasant surprise. It is a better action game than I expected, with better art, audio, and action than I had hoped for. As far as first attempts at making an action game go it's a damn good effort," giving it a 4/5.

More critically, IGN gave Stellar Blade a 7/10 explaining "Stellar Blade stands out as a gorgeous and well-crafted action game with very impressive strengths and very clear weaknesses," citing a lack of substance behind its story and characters, some poorly implemented RPG elements, and dull sidequests. Gene Park of The Washington Post awarded Stellar Blade 3 out of 4 stars, explaining "'Stellar Blade' doesn't make the strongest first impression, but it leaves a lasting one. What's more important, it's actually able to carve out its own distinguished identity by the end, much like Eve."

==== Portrayal of Eve ====
According to Den of Geek, some critics argued that the marketing for Stellar Blade heavily leaned on the sexual appeal of Eve, with elements like revealing costumes and suggestive character designs being central to the game's promotional strategy. The game has also received an Adults Only rating (also known as a 19-rating) in South Korea, attributed to its explicit content, including revealing outfits, violence, and suggestive imagery. TheGamer argued that the protagonist, while attractive, is "barely sexy at all," and that the lack of any real characterisation for Eve made the sexualised outfits "feel like she's playing dress up". Kim has defended some of these design choices by explaining that, from a third-person perspective, the player's view is predominantly directed at the back of the character, hence the emphasis on making this view appealing. He further elaborated that the design choices were made to entertain an adult audience. IGN Italia noted that while some criticized Eve's design as oversexualized, others felt there was a double standard among critics, fans, and developers who condemned the game while praising other examples like Nier: Automata and Bayonetta.

=== Sales ===
By June 2024, Shift Up announced that Stellar Blade had sold over 1 million units. By June 2025, the studio announced that the game had sold over 3 million units overall, with over 1 million units sold on PC in 3 days since its launch on the platform. As of January 2026, the game sold an estimated 6.1 million units according to market research firm Sensor Tower, including 3.7 million on PS5 and 2.4 million on Steam.

According to market research firm Circana, Stellar Blade was the best-selling game in North America in April 2024, reflecting its strong market performance during that month. According to the Entertainment Software Association of Canada, the game was the second-best-selling software in Canada for the same month. According to Famitsu, it sold 67,131 physical units in Japan during a two-week period ending May 5, 2024, making it that period's best-selling new release. They reported it had sold 111,490 physical units in Japan by July 14, 2024.

Following its PC launch, Stellar Blade ranked first on Steam's global top sellers list. The game reached over 183,000 concurrent players on Steam within a day. It surpassed 192,000 concurrent players on Steam over the first weekend after release. This placed it as the highest ever for a single-player game published by Sony.

=== Awards ===
In South Korea, Stellar Blade earned seven nominations at the Korean Game Awards and achieved a clean sweep across all categories. At The Game Awards 2024, the game received two nominations. It was also nominated for Action Game of the Year at the 28th Annual D.I.C.E. Awards. It appeared on several year-end lists of 2024, including Hardcore Gamer (3th), Push Square (4th), Complex (9th), Rolling Stone (19th), and Eurogamer (33th).

Year	Ceremony	Category	Result	Ref.
2024	The Game Awards 2024	Best Score and Music	Nominated	
2024	The Game Awards 2024	Best Action Game	Nominated	
2024	Korean Game Awards	Excellence Award	Won	
2024	Korean Game Awards	Popularity Game Award	Won	
2024	Korean Game Awards	Planning and Scenario	Won	
2024	Korean Game Awards	Sound Design	Won	
2024	Korean Game Awards	Best Graphics	Won	
2024	Korean Game Awards	Character Design	Won	
2024	Korean Game Awards	Outstanding Developer Award	Won	
2025	28th Annual D.I.C.E. Awards	Action Game of the Year	Nominated	
2025	21st British Academy Games Awards	New Intellectual Property	Longlisted	

== Sequel ==
Plans for a sequel were found in a Q1 earnings published by Shift Up on May 16, 2025. On May 5, 2026, a new earnings report from Shift Up said they intend to transition from publishing through Sony to self-publishing for the sequel. Stellar Blade: Blood Rain was officially unveiled at the Summer Game Fest on June 5, 2026.
