= Shift Up =

South Korean video game company

Shift Up corporation
- Type: Public
- Traded as: KRX: 462870
- Industry: Video games
- Founded: December 2, 2013; 12 years ago
- Founders: Kim Hyung Tae
- Headquarters: Seoul, South Korea
- Key people: Kim Hyung Tae (chairman and CEO); Jaewoo Ahn (executive director and CFO); Kyung Rip Min (executive director and CSO)
- Products: Goddess of Victory: Nikke; Stellar Blade
- Revenue: ▲ ₩294 billion (2025)
- Operating income: ▲ ₩181 billion (2025)
- Net income: ▲ ₩191 billion (2025)
- Total assets: ▲ ₩1.071 trillion (2025)
- Total equity: ▲ ₩910 billion (2025)
- Owner: Kim Hyung Tae (39%); Tencent (35%)
- Number of employees: 322 (December 2024)
- Subsidiaries: Unbound
- Website: shiftup.co.kr/eng/

Shift Up Corporation (stylized in all caps; Korean: 시프트업) is a South Korean video game developer and publisher. It was founded on December 2, 2013, by Kim Hyung Tae and is best known for the games Goddess of Victory: Nikke and Stellar Blade.

== History ==
Shift Up Corporation was founded in December 2013 by Kim Hyung Tae after leaving NCSoft, where he worked as art director on Blade & Soul.

On March 14, 2014, Next Floor (now Line Games) announced that it had signed an investment agreement with Shift Up, to strengthen its strategic partnership and expand its global mobile game lineup. It was also announced that the two developers would collaborate on a video game. On December 16, 2015, it was announced that the game would be called Destiny Child and that it would be a gacha role playing game. The game was first released in South Korea for Android and iOS on October 27, 2016. On November 24, 2017, the game was released in Japan. The world-wide release was on December 6, 2018. In 2018, Wemade Entertainment, another South Korean video game developer, acquired a 4.23% stake in Shift Up for ₩10 billion.

On April 4, 2019, Shift Up held a media event titled "Crank in Showcase". Two games were revealed, Project Eve and Project Nikke. Project Eve was announced as AAA post-apocalyptic action RPG for PC, PlayStation 4 and Xbox One. The game would be developed by the newly created Second Eve Studio using the Unreal Engine 4. Nikke was presented as online coop third-person shooter for Android and iOS developed with the Unity game engine.

On October 20, 2019, it was announced that Shift Up would take over the operation of the Korean and overseas services of Destiny Child. This was previously handled by Line Games. For the operation of the Japanese version, a new Japanese branch, Shift Up JP, was established in Japan in February 2020.

On May 27, 2021, Shift Up published a video game adaptation of South Korean web novel Why Raeliana Ended Up at the Duke's Mansion. The game was developed by Studio VINO, a subsidiary of Shift Up, and released on PC, Android and iOS. To commemorate the release of the game, Shift Up sold limited edition NFTs with illustrations by Hyung Tae.

In July 2022, Hyung Tae and a few other executives of Shift Up had sold some of their shares to IMM investment and Smilegate. During Sony's State of the Play conference on September 14, 2022, Shift Up announced that Project Eve would actually be called Stellar Blade and that it would be released exclusively for PlayStation 5 in 2023. On November 4, 2022, Nikke was released on Android and iOS, published by Level Infinite, a subsidiary of Tencent. A Windows version of the game was released on February 15, 2023. At the end of the month, Nikke had already generated a revenue of more than US$100 million. In November 2022, Shift Up signed a memorandum of understanding with the Saudi Arabian Ministry of Investment. In December, it was announced that Chinese technology conglomerate Tencent had acquired a 20% stake in Shift Up, which made them the second largest shareholder after Kim Hyung Tae and his associates.

In October 2023, Wemade sold their shares to Tencent for nearly ₩80 billion, resulting in a profit of nearly ₩70 billion. This transaction resulted in an increase of Tencent's stake in Shift Up to 24.23%. By the end of 2023, Tencent had raised their stake to 40.06%, significantly narrowing the gap with Hyung Tae and his associates, who owned 45.19%. In November 2023, it was revealed that Shift Up signed a contract to become Sony's first Korean second-party developer. In 2023, the company had 292 employees, of which 88% percent were developers.

On March 5, 2024, Shift Up filed an application to be listed on the Korean Stock Exchange with a projected valuation of $2.3 billion. In April, Stellar Blade was released and at the end of the month it was the top selling video game in Japan and the USA. In May, it was confirmed that Shift Up was considering a PC version and a sequel of Stellar Blade. At the same time, it was also revealed that the company was working on a new "AAA urban sci-fi action RPG", codenamed Project Witches (later changed to Project Spirits), with a planned release for 2027. A PC port of Stellar Blade was confirmed in August. On July 11, Shift Up raised ₩435 billion during its IPO. It was the largest public offering for a video game company in South Korea since 2021, when Krafton raised $3.8 billion. Following the IPO, Hyung Tae's ownership in the company decreased to 39%, whereas Tencent's stake fell to 35%. In 2024, Shift Up achieved annual revenue of ₩219.8 million, reflecting a 30% year-over-year growth. Most of the revenue came from Goddess of Victory: Nikke and Stellar Blade. Due to this financial success, Shift Up announced plans to expand its workforce from 322 to over 400 employees by the end of 2025.

On June 11, 2025, the Windows version of Stellar Blade was released, selling over one million copies within its first three days and bringing the game's total sales to over three million units. On March 31, 2026, Shift Up announced it had acquired Shinji Mikami's game studio Unbound and will publish the studio's upcoming titles.

== Games developed ==
| Year | Title | Platform | Publisher | Ref. |
|---|---|---|---|---|
| 2016 | Destiny Child | Android, iOS | Line Games | |
| 2021 | Why Raeliana Ended Up at the Duke's Mansion | Windows, Android, iOS | Shift Up | |
| 2022 | Goddess of Victory: Nikke | Android, iOS, Windows | Level Infinite | |
| 2024 | Stellar Blade | PlayStation 5 | Sony Interactive Entertainment | |
| 2025 | Stellar Blade | Windows | Sony Interactive Entertainment | |
| 2026 | Stellar Blade | Nintendo Switch 2 | Shift Up | |
| 2027 | Project Spirits (working title) | TBA | Level Infinite | |
| TBA | Stellar Blade: Blood Rain | TBA | Shift Up | |

== Games published ==
| Year | Title | Platform | Developer | Ref. |
|---|---|---|---|---|
| TBA | Untitled Shinji Mikami game | TBA | Unbound | |
