= Shin Jae-eun =

Korean model (born 1991)

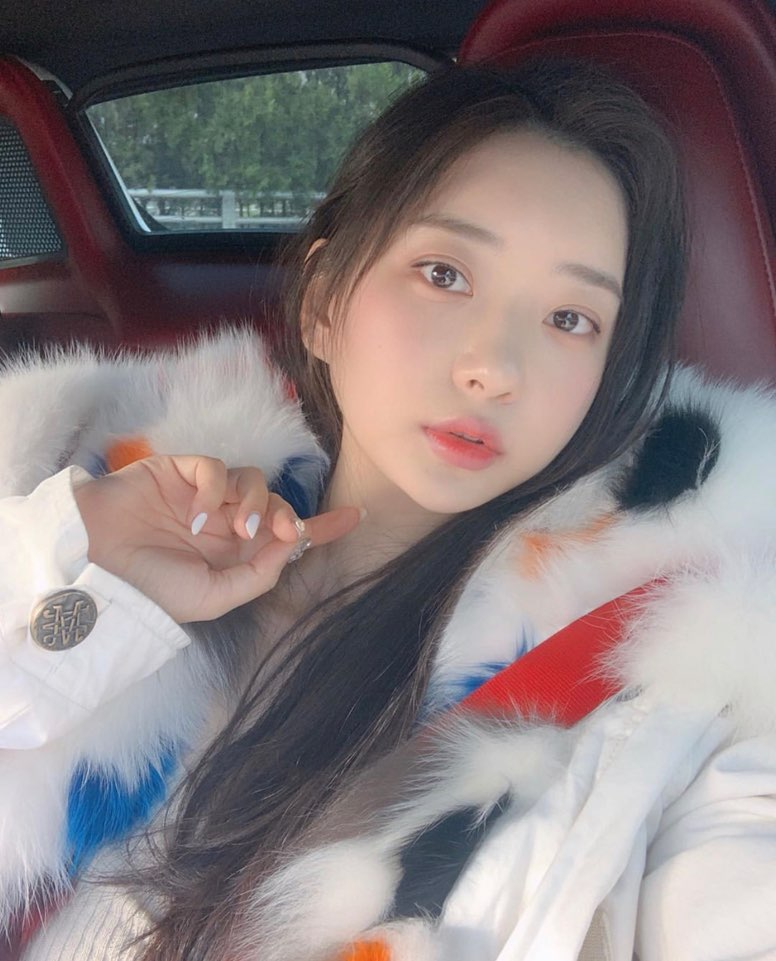
- Born: July 22, 1991 (age 35)
- Other name: Zennyrt
- Education: Hongik University (Department of Architectural Engineering)
- Occupation: Model

Korean name
- Hangul: 신재은
- Hanja: 申才恩
- RR: Sin Jaeeun
- MR: Sin Chaeŭn
- Website: Official website

Shin Jae-eun (Korean: 신재은; born July 22, 1991), also known by the mononym Zennyrt, is a South Korean model.

== Early life ==
Shin Jae-eun was born on July 22, 1991, in Seoul, South Korea. She married in November 2019.

== Career ==
She has appeared in various media including commercials, photo shoots, and music videos.

Shin was the cover model for Maxim (Korea) for its August 2018 issue. She has been a model for the company "Vigo Live" since August 2019.

On June 27, 2019, she was featured as a video and promotional model for Korean first person shooter video game Sudden Attack by South Korean company Nexon GT. In 2024, she served as the bodyscan model for protagonist Eve for the video game Stellar Blade by Shift Up.
