= Magna Carta Place =

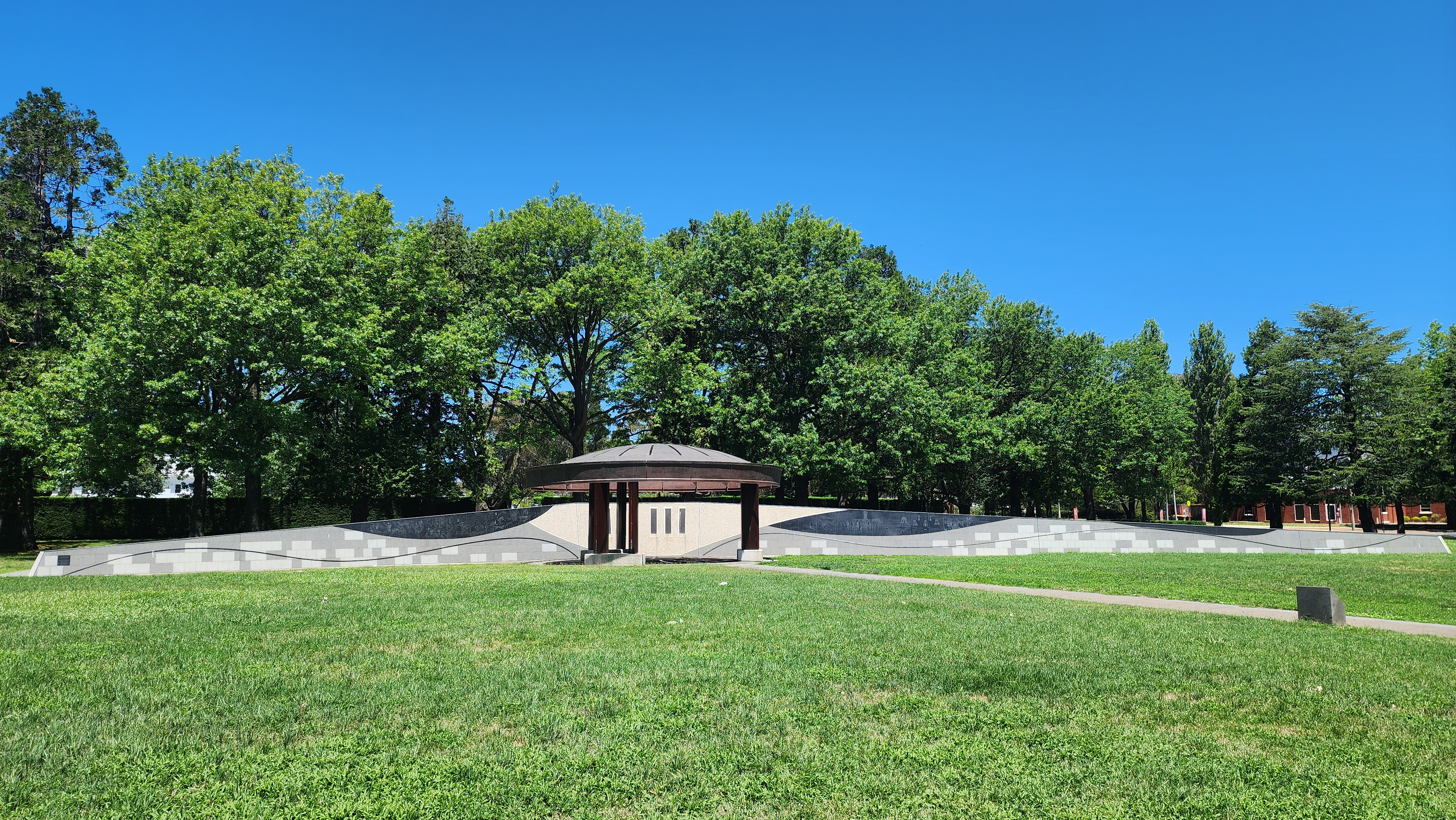
- Magna Carta Place, within Australia's Parliamentary Triangle in Canberra, officially dedicated on 26 September 2001
- Interactive map of Magna Carta Place
- Location: Parkes, Australian Capital Territory
- Coordinates: 35.301°S 149.127°E
- Manager: National Capital Authority

Magna Carta Place is located in Canberra, Australia to the north-west of Old Parliament House. Centrally located in the place is a Magna Carta Monument which was provided as a gift to the people of Australia from the British Government to commemorate the centenary of Federation of Australia. The site was dedicated in 1997 which was the 700th anniversary of the sealing of Magna Carta by King Edward I of England. A 1297 copy of Magna Carta, purchased by the Australian government in 1952, is on display in nearby Parliament House. The monument was officially dedicated by then Prime Minister of Australia John Howard on 26 September 2001. Magna Carta Place is located on a semicircular network of roads consisting of King George Terrace, Queen Victoria Terrace and Langton Crescent.
