= Magna Carta: Tears of Blood =

2004 video game

MagnaCarta: Tears of Blood
- North American PlayStation 2 cover art
- Developer: Softmax
- Publishers: KOR: Sony Computer Entertainment; JP: Banpresto; NA: Atlus; PAL: 505 Game Street
- Director: Yeon-Kyu Choi
- Producers: Shintarō Miura; Young-Gee Cho; Lee Jackie
- Designer: Seok-Hwan Jeon
- Programmer: Chang-Geun Lim
- Artists: Hyung-tae Kim; Ki-Nam Kim
- Writers: Rae-Yeon Lee; Byung-Soo Kwon; Junko Okazaki
- Composer: Sung-Woon Jang
- Series: Magna Carta
- Engine: Unreal Engine 2
- Platforms: PlayStation 2, PlayStation Portable
- Release: PlayStation 2: JP: November 11, 2004; KOR: December 12, 2004; NA: November 15, 2005; AU: March 16, 2006; EU: April 7, 2006; PSP: JP: May 25, 2006
- Genre: Role-playing
- Mode: Single-player

MagnaCarta: Tears of Blood (Korean: 마그나카르타: 피의 눈물 Mageuna Kaleuta: Piui Nunmul) simply known as MagnaCarta (Japanese: マグナカルタ Maguna Karuta) (Note: MagnaCarta (マグナカルタ, Maguna Karuta)) is a role-playing video game developed by Softmax and published by Banpresto for the PlayStation 2 in Japan, Atlus in North America, and 505 Game Street in PAL regions. Sony Computer Entertainment released the game in Softmax's native country South Korea as MagnaCarta: Crimson Stigmata (Korean: 마그나카르타: 진홍의 낙인 Mageuna Kaleuta: Jinhong-ui Nag-in). It is the second installment of the Magna Carta series and a sequel to the 2001 game Magna Carta: The Phantom of Avalanche. A PlayStation Portable version was released in May 2006 as MagnaCarta Portable (Japanese: マグナカルタ ポータブル Maguna Karuta Pōtaburu) (Note: MagnaCarta Portable (マグナカルタ ポータブル, Maguna Karuta Pōtaburu)).

== Gameplay ==
The game's battle elements borrowed from Shadow Hearts and the Star Ocean series. Up to three characters may move around the battlefield in real time. The player can only control one character at a time and can only attack after the character fills its "leadership meter" by remaining still. Once filled, the character can initiate an attack by performing a series of three timed button presses (known as the "trinity ring"). If the attack is unsuccessful, the leadership meter empties, and the player must wait for it to refill again.

The three modes of combat that are uniquely embedded are "standard", "combo" and "counter". The standard mode is excellent for offensive and defensive attacks. By perfecting the timing of the buttons, characters will learn stronger attacks. Combo attacks lack defense but are generally used to create powerful offensive attacks by combining all attacks in one turn. The counter mode does what its name implies; not only is the user able to block but also attack thumb by predicting their enemies' attacks. Players using this mode do not exhaust their leadership meter. Characters may attack with various combat "styles" learned in the game, which use different chi (energy) types to increase their utility. There are eight different types of chi present in all areas, but in different exhaustible quantities.

== Plot ==
The game takes place in the land of Efferia, where a seemingly endless war has raged between the continent's two species: Humans and Yason. Humans and Yason are similar in appearance, but Yason have lighter skin and differently shaped ears. The protagonist of the game, Calintz, is a high-ranking leader of the Tears of Blood, a mercenary squad hired out by the Human Alliance to deal with problems they cannot, or will not, touch. Since the group is not part of the official army, the mercs are disliked by the Alliance soldiers. The core group also consists of Azel, a youthful sword wielder who looks up to Calintz, Eonis, a powerful mage, and Haren, a martial artist. Save for Azel, all group members have a heavy grudge against the Yason for the deaths of friends and family. The Blast Worms, highly skilled Yason soldiers, are led by the Four Warriors, an elite group who wields great power and magic.

When the Alliance's use of the "forbidden magic" fails, Calintz stops an assault by one of the Four Warriors' summoned familiars. After destroying a bridge to prevent enemy advancement, he finds himself in a cavern being healed by an unfamiliar woman. Because she suffers from amnesia, all she remembers is her name, Reith, and that she can use very powerful healing magic. Eventually, they find their way out of the cave and, as a show of thanks for saving him, Calintz offers to take her to Amabat, a city of high-ranking and powerful priestesses, thinking her to be one of them. As the story progresses, Reith, as well as the Tears of Blood and Blast Worms, learn that she is a much more important piece of the puzzle than anyone had realized. When she begins to regain her memories, Reith, who is also Queen Amila, begins her mission to find the traitor of the Yason as well as the mastermind behind the plot of resurrecting the Light of Salvation. This is where the dark truths behind the war begin to unravel where Agreian, the General of the Human Alliance, turns out to be the mastermind (or known as "Neikan") for reviving the Light of Salvation as well as prolonging the war between the Yason and Humans. Will Calintz and the rest of the Tears of Blood be able to stop Agreian for good?

== Reception ==
Reception

Aggregate score
Aggregator	Score
Metacritic	66/100

Review scores
Publication	Score
Computer Games Magazine	1.5/5
Electronic Gaming Monthly	6.33/10
Eurogamer	4/10
Famitsu	(PS2) 32/40 (PSP) 29/40
Game Informer	8.25/10
GameSpot	7.1/10
GameTrailers	6.5/10
GameZone	8.9/10
IGN	6.1/10
Official U.S. PlayStation Magazine	3/5

The game received "mixed or average" reviews according to the review aggregator website Metacritic. GameSpot claimed that the "well-developed cast of characters keeps the story interesting" but its "extremely linear campaign feels restrictive at times."

IGN's review stated that "the poorly-executed battle system ... runs into too many problems for its own good." They heavily criticized the game's English voice acting and called it "Ill-timed, badly-acted, and poorly cast." In Japan, Famitsu gave it a score of 32 out of 40 for the PlayStation 2 version, and one eight and three sevens for the PSP version.
