= Magna Carta: The Phantom of Avalanche =

2001 video game

MagnaCarta
- Developer: Softmax
- Publisher: Softmax
- Director: Yeon-Kyu Choi
- Producers: Young-Hee Jeong; Joo-Hwan Lee
- Designer: Yeon-Kyu Choi
- Programmers: Kyoung-Il Kim; Chang-Geun Lim
- Artists: Seok-Hwan Jeon; Hyung-tae Kim; Ki-Nam Kim
- Writers: Yeon-Kyu Choi; Rae-Yeon Lee
- Composers: Sung-Woon Jang; Sang-Ho Lee; Hyung-Woo Noh
- Series: Magna Carta
- Platform: Windows
- Release: December 28, 2001
- Genre: Role-playing
- Mode: Single player

MagnaCarta: The Phantom of Avalanche (마그나 카르타: 눈사태의 유령 Mageuna Kaleuta: Nunsataeui Yulyeong), simply known as MagnaCarta (마그나카르타), is a Korean role-playing video game developed and published by Softmax for Windows in 2001. It is the predecessor to the PlayStation 2 title, Magna Carta: Crimson Stigmata, and the first installment in the Magna Carta series. It was never released outside of Korea.

== Gameplay ==
The game's Carta (眞名) system, which takes on a similar method as Final Fantasy VIII's junction system, relies on the usage of hanja (Han characters) to represent various energy patterns as every living thing carries a distinct energy pattern and may rely upon the use of Carta to manipulate this energy for various purposes. In application, these patterns are individually assigned to each character attribute to directly affect character growth. Some Carta may be more effective when assigned to a specific attribute due to the compatibility between the character's own personal energies in compliance with the Carta's unique energies. The available stock of the particular Carta also plays a role in determining its effectiveness.

Magna Carta employs a turn-based battle system based on the conditional usage of TP (Turn Points). When a character achieves his or her turn, the player is given the options of moving the character around and / or executing a skill. (The turn automatically ends upon executing a skill, regardless of any other conditions present.) Both the movement range of the character, as well as any skills she or he executes, costs a specific number of Turn Points to be accomplished. While moving, free roaming is allowed around the battle field during one's turn, but within a limited range which is indicated by an aura. The size of the aura, like many elements of battle, may be affected by the turn range, so characters who have TP left over from previous rounds may find a slight range advantage in the next.

== Plot ==
Calintz, once having been a high-ranking royal guard, has left his home of Shudelmir many years ago to seek adventure elsewhere. Though having left his home in a peaceful state, Calintz decided to return home years later only to find Shudelmir in chaos. The sheer growth of monsters, as well as the rise of two important factions, have left Calintz with no choice but to join the Schwarz Strum as the 7th Squad Leader. Rumors have surfaced about the origin of the monsters. Particularly, the monster growth has been attributed to the enthroning of the new Emperor, Shulenlord. Many people believe that Vermillion, one of the two rising factions, is releasing the creatures in hopes of dethroning the new Emperor, and that the Emperor is retaliating against Vermillion in this same fashion. Amidst this conflict, political struggles between the fallen Princess, Juclecia, and the new Empress, Leona, have contributed a fair share to the chaos of Shudelmir. Having lost her mother to a senseless crime of murder, Juclecia was stripped of her royal authority and cast out into the rural district to conscribe to the lifestyle of a mere commoner. Though Juclecia was entitled to inherit her mother's throne, she held no say in the enthronement of the new Empress nor the Empress' decision to abolish Juclecia's royalty. Rallying the support of other nobles, Juclecia hopes that she can achieve Empress Leona's dethronement and restore peace to her kingdom.

Cliave, father to Princess Juclecia and Emperor Shulenlord, invaded and destroyed the prosperous Kingdom of Krios many years ago. This invasion was thought to take place in order to preserve the integrity of Cliave's power, as he feared that Krios had grown too strong. Ironically, Krios was Cliave's homeland, and his own uncle was its ruler. Still, Cliave would regard his own family as a political enemy and carry on his back the shame of hailing ruthless destruction against Krios. Krios' remaining citizens, reduced to mere slaves, had risen up against their adversity and formed the Vermillion faction. Heading up this group were two mysterious figures—the ominous Ferenan, and the strange outsider, Tristan. Though Vermillion intently sought to rebuild Krios, their violent methods were often put into question, and have earned the group a fearful reputation with the public. Focusing their attention on Shudelmir's political presence, Vermillion has met much resistance from the Schwarz Strum.

== Reception ==
On release, Magna Carta impressed with its graphics, but quickly gained infamy for being extremely buggy, resulting in the publisher's recall of the game.
