= P.N.03 =

2003 video game by Capcom

- North American box art with main protagonist Vanessa Z. Schneider
- Developer: Capcom Production Studio 4
- Publishers: WW: Capcom; AU: THQ
- Director: Shinji Mikami
- Producer: Hiroyuki Kobayashi
- Designers: Kuniomi Matsushita; Hiroaki Yasukura
- Composers: Shusaku Uchiyama; Makoto Tomozawa
- Platform: GameCube
- Release: JP: March 27, 2003; UK: August 29, 2003; AU: September 5, 2003; NA: September 9, 2003
- Genre: Third-person shooter
- Mode: Single-player

P.N.03 (Note: Japanese: ピーエヌ スリー, Hepburn: Pī Enu Surī; lit. 'P.N. Three') (Product Number Three) is a 2003 third-person shooter developed and published by Capcom for the GameCube. Set in a space colony compound, the game follows a female mercenary fighting against berserk robots. Gameplay focuses on defensive tactics and includes abilities that can be upgraded.

Directed by Shinji Mikami and produced by Hiroyuki Kobayashi, the game is part of the Capcom Five, a group of video games developed by Capcom Production Studio 4 to introduce new intellectual property. To avoid similarities with Devil May Cry and Resident Evil, the game designers emphasized defensive and rhythmic maneuvers and a "feminine" game world. The game was developed on a tight schedule in an attempt to offset Capcom's poor fiscal year.

P.N.03 received mixed reviews and failed commercially. Several critics found the game repetitive and unintuitive. They were divided on its gameplay mechanics: some disliked its controls—specifically the inability to move and shoot simultaneously—while others compared it favorably to the golden age of arcade games. Mikami repurposed ideas from P.N.03 for the game Vanquish.

== Gameplay and plot ==
Vanessa Z. Schneider fighting an enemy.

The player controls Vanessa Z. Schneider, a freelance mercenary working on colonized planets. She is contracted by a mysterious client to destroy Computerized Armament Management System (CAMS) robots that have gone berserk. Robots of this type had been responsible for killing Vanessa's parents. To combat the CAMS, Vanessa wears "Aegis suits", powered exoskeletons that connect to her spine and allow her to fire energy beams from her palms and to perform powerful attacks called "energy drives". It depletes the energy meter, grants temporary invulnerability to Vanessa and damages multiple enemies. At checkpoints, the player uses points earned from defeated robots to purchase Aegis suits, suit upgrades and energy drives. The player may play "trial missions" (randomly generated levels) between missions to score extra points.

The CAMS robots attack in set patterns, and their next moves are indicated by visual and aural cues. The player avoids these attacks via evasive spins, rolls and other maneuvers. Vanessa cannot move while attacking, and so the player must often use the environment as cover. Defeated enemies sometimes drop items that replenish health and energy or that trigger a combo timer, which multiplies the points earned from enemies destroyed consecutively. Each mission takes place in a series of rooms that contain a fixed number of enemies and may include a boss robot. At the end of a mission, the player receives a score based on the number of rooms explored and enemies destroyed.

Late in the game, Vanessa discovers a clone of herself in a CAMS facility but is forced to abandon her when the building's self-destruct sequence is initiated. After destroying the CAMS central core, Vanessa encounters a digital projection of the client, whose appearance is identical to her own. She speculates that she is a clone of the client, but the client counters that none of their memories may be real. Vanessa debates whether to continue her work as a mercenary.

== Development ==
In November 2002, Capcom announced the Capcom Five, a group of video games developed by Capcom Production Studio 4 and overseen by Resident Evil creator Shinji Mikami. Among these titles was P.N.03, directed by Mikami. Capcom conceived the Capcom Five to bring new intellectual property to the industry, which the company viewed at the time as stagnant. According to Hiroyuki Kobayashi, the P.N.03 team's goal was to make a game both "fun to watch and fun to play". The team focused on the game's audiovisuals, action and speed, and they tried to balance the "tension experienced on the battlefield and the exhilaration of taking out the enemies". Mikami wanted P.N.03 to evoke the same feelings as classic Famicom games. While the staff felt the background graphics were important, they prioritized excitement in the game world.

During the planning stage, P.N.03 was originally a wargame referred to as the "robot war game". Five days into development, the staff created a preliminary demonstration of the graphics. Mikami was unsatisfied with this prototype and decided to rework the project as a third-person shooting game. The director wanted to name the game Jaguar to reflect Vanessa's cat-like agility. However, other staff members disliked the name: some claimed that it failed to describe the game, while others thought that White Jaguar was a better title. Mikami chose P.N.03 as a hint to the game's plot.

Early versions of P.N.03 highlighted shooting gameplay and featured the protagonist with a gun, which was removed due to time constraints.

Early coverage of P.N.03 by GameSpot and IGN highlighted the game's acrobatics and shooting. P.N.03's gameplay was initially similar to that of Devil May Cry: Vanessa attacked with two pistols and performed acrobatic moves like Dante. Feeling that it resembled Devil May Cry too closely, Mikami altered the game to reward players for performing defensive moves. Mikami wanted Vanessa to use guns, but the developers couldn't complete the animated graphics for weapons in time for release. The guns were replaced with energy bolts fired from the character. In an effort to meet yearly sales goals, Capcom developed P.N.03 quickly and released it in March 2003. Many of Capcom's releases for the year had underperformed. Viewtiful Joe, another Capcom Five title, was delayed into the next fiscal year to decrease the possible sales that had to be offset. After leaving Capcom, Mikami later incorporated ideas he intended for P.N.03 into the 2010 game Vanquish.

Kobayashi aimed to avoid conventions established in Resident Evil, such as that series' dark, masculine world. With P.N.03, Kobayashi wanted to portray a "white" world with "feminine, delicate lines". To that end, the staff applied a minimalist approach to the visuals, used "fine drawn lines", and emphasized "visibility and creativity" in the game world. To maintain the game's "delicate image", the developers tried to make the visuals easy to view and understand. The team crafted the gameplay to avoid "button mashing"; instead, players were meant to observe enemy attack patterns and think before acting. Mechanical designer Shou Sakai tried to craft "things that would stick in [the player's] mind". Because of the tight development schedule, 3D models had to be created immediately after their designs were completed. Sakai described the lack of time as the "toughest part" of the process.

Mikami was indifferent to the main character's gender. During the early creation process, he left the decision to his staff, who ultimately chose a female character. Because P.N.03 takes place in a space colony, Mikami wanted Vanessa's country of origin to be ambiguous. To that end, she was given a combination of French, German, and English names. Vanessa's movements were animated freehand, without motion capture technology. The designers posed Vanessa crouched on her hands and knees to resemble a jaguar, as an homage to the Jaguar title. The staff integrated rhythmic motions to her maneuvers to emulate dancing and to make her appear stylish. Kobayashi wanted Vanessa to be a "cool and sexy mercenary with a tough exterior that hides her dark past." In retrospect, he was proud of the character's style and movements.

== Release ==
The Capcom Five were first announced as games exclusive to the GameCube; however, Capcom later ported most of the titles to other consoles. At the end of 2002, the company confirmed that the game would be released in 2003 on GameCube. In January 2003, the company slated the game for a March release in Japan, but retracted the exclusivity announcement. At a press conference prior to the 2003 Electronic Entertainment Expo, however, Capcom reaffirmed that P.N.03 would be available only for the GameCube. In the end, P.N.03 was the only Capcom Five title to remain exclusive to the system.

P.N.03 was the first of the Capcom Five to be released. Before the game's debut in Japan, Capcom distributed playable demos to stores and released screenshots to the media. Upon the game's release, Capcom shipped 25,000 copies to Japanese retailers. Under 11,000 units were sold, which made the game Japan's 26th best-selling title during the last week of March 2003. These low sales failed to help Capcom meet its yearly sales goals. The North American localization was announced in July 2003. Few aspects of the game were changed for the North American market. Capcom advertised a free T-shirt as a pre-order incentive in North America. Promotional sunglasses modeled after Vanessa's were also released.

== Reception ==
Reception

Aggregate scores
Aggregator	Score
GameRankings	64%
Metacritic	63

Review scores
Publication	Score
Electronic Gaming Monthly	5/5/4
Eurogamer	7 out of 10
Famitsu	7 out of 10
Game Informer	5.75 out of 10
GamePro	4/5
GameSpot	5.1 out of 10
GameSpy	3/5
GamesRadar+	3/5
IGN	5.3 out of 10
Nintendo World Report	6 out of 10
GMR	4 out of 10
Cubed3	7 out of 10

P.N.03 failed commercially and received average to mixed reviews, with scores of 64% and 63 on review aggregate websites GameRankings and Metacritic, respectively. Several critics predicted P.N.03's cult status and lack of mainstream accessibility at its release and afterwards, and it has been listed in several articles as being an "overlooked" or "hidden" gem that "[deserves] another chance". It has been called a "cult classic" and "future classic" that could "easily confused with a 3D action title" and leave gamers "confused or disappointed" with its "initially awkward" controls, but requires "perseverance". Daniel Etherington from BBC Technology News said that P.N.03 "probably will not have mass-market appeal despite its quality" as "a hectic shoot-em-up with a fiddly control system, appearing only on GameCube...but there is the definite possibility of cult appeal".

Dave Halverson of Play (US magazine) gave P.N.03 an A− and praised it as "old-school...fun and length through mastery and addiction" and "a work of art from beginning to end". GameSpy's Ben Turner called P.N.03 "Aliens crossed with Dirty Dancing"; Bryn Williams called the environments "slick" and "crisp" and Vanessa a "cool...sexy space vixen", and said the game is a "stylish and challenging...shooter dressed in 3D that takes its cue from classic high-scoring shmups".

Keza MacDonald from Eurogamer called P.N.03 a "balletic and difficult, and quite old-fashioned...3D transposition of the traditional 2D vertical shooter", citing its "clean, minimalist style, the purposefully restrictive control and the rhythm and flow of the shooting". Reviewer Tom Bramwell conceded some issues, applauding "the stunningly clean, almost textureless" environments and "magnificently detailed, beautiful explosions" but wishing for more varied environments, and concluding "although P.N.03 is plainly flawed, with a little perseverance the gameplay still shines through as something relatively new and engaging". Nintendo World Report's Jonathan Metts stated "P.N. 03 has a lot in common with Rare's Jet Force Gemini or Kemco's Winback" with "strange controls that you'll either love or hate" and "engaging...and challenging" shooting sections, but he had issues with the camera and called the game "flawed", "niche", and "offset by a lot of frustration and tedium".

Electronic Gaming Monthly's three reviewers characterized the game as shallow, repetitive and devoid of plot and character development. Mark MacDonald of the magazine criticized Vanessa's inability to move and shoot at the same time. By contrast, the reviewer for Edge wrote, "P.N.03 may be rather short and its premise simple, but grace under fire has rarely been done better." The writer favorably compared its gameplay to that of Space Invaders, in that the game "rewards skill above all else and mastery brings huge satisfaction". The reviewer cited Vanessa as one of the game's high points. In a 2009 retrospective review, the Edge magazine staff echoed its previous praise of P.N.03 but acknowledged the game's awkward control mechanics. The staff commented that Vanessa's potentially fluid movement is difficult to execute, but that the challenge of mastering the control scheme is part of the game's charm.

GamePro's Mike Weigand called the game "a long, intense, thumb-busting shooter that tests trigger fingers and patience levels." He found the environments and enemies repetitive, but he cited "strong aesthetics" and "a slick reward system" as redemptive features. Weigand summarized that, while the game lacks depth, it may be recommended to "those who crave a shoot-em-up with old-school inflections". Paul Byrnes of GMR found P.N.03 to be a "boring and repetitive" missed opportunity. He felt that it lacked flow, thanks in large part to Vanessa's "clumsily staccato" movements and inability to move and shoot simultaneously. Game Informer's Andrew Reiner wrote that P.N.03's setting, animations and protagonist give it an "undeniable allure" of freshness and originality. However, he disliked the game's control system and wrote that "blowing away robots gets old rather quickly". Reiner called P.N.03's length, which he estimated to be four hours, its "most disappointing aspect".

Greg Kasavin of GameSpot wrote that "you'll almost certainly be unimpressed with the repetitive and cumbersome action at the heart of [P.N.03]." He disliked the game's separation into brief, discrete sections; and, while he saw the game's design as a reference to that of older games, he found that P.N.03 lacked the "extremely precise controls and smooth, colorful graphics" of the titles that inspired it. Kasavin summarized it as "a short, uninspired game that's yet another would-be imitator of Capcom's own Devil May Cry." Matt Casamassina of IGN wrote that players will "want to like" the game, but that its "design flaws and sloppy execution" are impossible to overlook. He found it to be shallow and repetitive, and he wrote that its fast pace and "unresponsive control setup" combine to place the game "at war with itself." However, he believed that P.N.03 is "not a disaster—merely a disappointment", and that it sits "solidly in average country." In a 2012 retrospective from Eurogamer, Chris Schilling called the game the outcast of Shinji Mikami's work, criticizing its plot and calling its control scheme its "biggest obstacle". He later added "if at times its appeal can be hard to pin down, that doesn't mean it should be so easily forgotten", mentioning the satisfaction of beating the bosses in the game.
