= Blade & Soul =

2016 video game

- Cover
- Genre: Fantasy
- Video game
- Developer: Team Bloodlust (NCsoft Developer Division) (PC)
- Publisher: NCSoft
- Genre: Action MMORPG
- Engine: Unreal Engine 3; Revival, Neo; Unreal Engine 4
- Platform: Microsoft Windows
- Released: KOR: June 30, 2012; JP: May 20, 2014; NA: January 19, 2016; EU: January 19, 2016
- Anime television series
- Directed by: Hiroshi Takeuchi; Hiroshi Hamasaki
- Produced by: Gō Tanaka; Makoto Furukawa; Tetsuya Endō; Shigeaki Arima; Kiyotomo Sudō; Hidetada Soga; Gaku Nakagawa; Tadashi Hoshino; Yoshito Mitsui
- Written by: Atsuhiro Tomioka
- Music by: Taro Iwashiro
- Studio: Gonzo
- Licensed by: AUS: Hanabee; NA: Sentai Filmworks; UK: Animatsu Entertainment
- Original network: TBS, HBC, RKB, MBS, CBC, TBS Channel 1, BS-TBS, Anime Network
- Original run: April 3, 2014 – June 26, 2014
- Episodes: 13
- icon

Blade & Soul (Korean: 블레이드 앤 소울; RR: Beulleideu aen soul) is a Wuxia-themed massively multiplayer online role-playing game developed by Korean NCSoft (Team Bloodlust). Blade & Soul was released in Western territories on January 19, 2016. A Japanese animated television adaptation aired in 2014 from April 3 to June 26 on TBS and other stations.

The mobile game adaptation Blade & Soul Revolution was released on December 6, 2018.

== Gameplay ==
Blade & Soul features Wuxia-style kung fu in an open-world environment. Players create playable characters that explore the world by completing quests assigned by various NPCs. The game uses a real-time battle system in the third-person camera view and requires players to "combo" a series of attacks, much like that of fighting games. The game also features an innovative "Downed" mechanic, allowing players to recover from the brink of death. Players begin with "player-versus environment" combat (PvE) but may participate in "player-versus-player" (PvP) combat later in the game.

=== Character customization ===
Blade & Soul features character customization system considered by the developers to be especially extensive at the time, including body sliders for areas as specific as the pelvis and calves, as well as options for height, hairstyle, facial structure, facial markings, makeup, and eye color.

==== Races ====
Characters may be one of four playable races based on the Four Symbols of Chinese folklore: The Gon (based on the Azure Dragon), the Jin (based on the Black Tortoise), the Yun (based on the Vermillion Bird, also known as the Fenghuang), or the Lyn (based on the White Tiger).

== Development ==
Weeks before NCmedia day, NCSoft announced a new Unreal Engine 3-based MMORPG only known by its codename 'Project M. For the next two weeks, a teaser website was updated revealing more information about the project.

During E3 2007, Sony entered into an exclusive deal with NCSoft to produce new titles exclusively for the PlayStation 3. This contract included titles from both existing intellectual properties owned by NCSoft. Blade & Soul, alongside Guild Wars 2, was initially developed for release on the PlayStation 3 and Xbox 360. There were no updates on the development of the titles for the consoles and the console versions were cancelled.

The first closed beta test was scheduled for April 27, 2011, while the open beta test and commercial release were to be determined within the year.

In July 2011, Tencent gained the publishing rights of Blade & Soul in China, and made its first appearance at ChinaJoy. Blade & Soul launched in China on November 23, 2013, with an open beta which seamlessly moved into official launch.

The second closed beta test took place from August 29 to September 10, 2011. During this event, the Assassin class was playable for the first time.

After an open beta test on June 21, 2012, with a record number of 150,000 players, the official Korean Blade & Soul launch commenced on June 30.

In 2013, HTK gained the rights for an English version, initially intended to be released sometime in 2014 after the Chinese commercial launch of the new Blade & Soul anime in Japan alongside Taiwan and Russia.

For NA and EU region closed beta of the game began on October 29, 2015. NA and EU beta testing occurred over the course of five weekends beginning on October 30 and concluding on December 21. The official launches of NA and EU servers occurred on January 19, 2016.

NCSoft developed "Blade & Soul Vision Update", the renovation project that aimed to upgrade the engine to Unreal Engine 4, and launched as the Blade & Soul Revival expansion in June 2021 for South Korea servers, and in Q3 2021 for NA and EU servers.

== Media ==
=== Anime ===
An anime adaptation of the game was produced and aired from April to June 2014, in which Hiroshi Hamasaki and Takeuchi Hiroshi directed the anime at the studio Gonzo from scripts by Atsuhiro Tomioka. Eri Nagata adapted Hyung-Tae Kim's game character designs for animation and served as chief animation director. The original storyline revolves around a swordswoman named Alka who travels to seek revenge for her murdered teacher. The opening theme of the anime is "Sayonara Usotsuki" (サヨナラ嘘ツキ) by MimimemeMIMI, and the ending theme is "RAINBOW" by LEGO BIG MORL. The series was streamed by Crunchyroll in the West.

| No. | Title | Original release date |
|---|---|---|
| 1 | "Path" "Michi" (Japanese: 道) | April 3, 2014 |
Alka is hired by a group of villagers as a mercenary against the forces of the Param Empire. However, upon discovery of her true identity based on a butterfly marking under her arm, the Param Empire initiates a massacre of the village.
| 2 | "Desires" "Yoku" (Japanese: 欲) | April 10, 2014 |
Alka travels to a corrupt oasis city in search of information, where she is targeted by multiple mercenaries due to a bounty placed on her head by the Param Empire.
| 3 | "Revenge" "Kataki" (Japanese: 仇) | April 17, 2014 |
| 4 | "Sword" "Ken" (Japanese: 剣) | April 24, 2014 |
| 5 | "Flower" "Hana" (Japanese: 花) | May 1, 2014 |
| 6 | "Dream" "Yume" (Japanese: 夢) | May 8, 2014 |
| 7 | "Time" "Jikan" (Japanese: 時) | May 15, 2014 |
| 8 | "Sky" "Sora" (Japanese: 空) | May 22, 2014 |
| 9 | "Moon" "Tsuki" (Japanese: 月) | May 29, 2014 |
| 10 | "Sin" "Tsumi" (Japanese: 罪) | June 5, 2014 |
| 11 | "Punishment" "Batsu" (Japanese: 罰) | June 12, 2014 |
| 12 | "Soul" "Tamashī" (Japanese: 魂) | June 19, 2014 |
| 13 | "God" "Kami" (Japanese: 神) | June 26, 2014 |

== Sequels ==
In NC Media Day 2018, NCSoft has announced three Blade & Soul IP games:

1. Blade & Soul S, a chibi-style open-world hero-collection game, is currently opening under the name Hoyeon in South Korea. This game will be open as global services in September 2025 under the name Blade & Soul Heroes.
2. Blade & Soul M, a mobile port version of Blade & Soul by Team Bloodlust
3. Blade & Soul 2, a direct sequel to Blade & Soul by Team B2.

Due to the lack of a development team and Team Bloodlust focusing on the Unreal Engine 4 upgrade of the PC version and the console port version, the development process of Blade & Soul M was halted and delayed, before it was canceled in 2020 and Blade & Soul M team was merged into Team B2. All developed elements have been integrated into Blade & Soul 2.

Blade & Soul 2 is focusing on the all-new PVE and PVP combat experiences designed for playing on the mobile platform and on the PCs, sharing a little connection to Blade & Soul. It is powered by Unreal Engine 4. The sequel was launched on August 26, 2021, for the Android, iOS, and Microsoft Windows, and is planned to be released for the console in the future. Cross-play function was applied for all versions of Blade & Soul 2.

NC announced on 17 December 2025 that Blade & Soul 2 would be shut down on 30 June 2026. Blade & Soul Heroes was shut down on 16 June 2026.
