= Kim Hyung-tae (entrepreneur) =

South Korean businessman (born 1978)

- 김형태
- Born: February 7, 1978 (age 48); South Korea
- Education: Chung-Ang University (dropout)
- Occupation: Business executive
- Years active: 2013–present
- Title: Chairman and CEO of Shift Up

Kim Hyung-tae (Korean: 김형태; born February 7, 1978) is a South Korean video game developer and business executive. He is the founder of Shift Up, where he is the chairman of the board and chief executive officer (CEO).

In April 2025, Forbes estimated his net worth at US$725 million.

== Early life and education ==
Growing up, Kim enjoyed drawing. He attended Chung-Ang University, majoring in design but dropped out.

== Career as artist ==
Kim began working professionally as an illustrator in 1997 and joined the game company Softmax in 1998. Kim would be famous for his character design in games like the Magna Carta series and Blade & Soul; and later worked at NCSoft as an art director.

== As entrepreneur ==
In 2013, Kim founded Shift Up.

Kim served as executive producer on Goddess of Victory: Nikke, which Shift Up released on November 4, 2022. He also served as director on the action-adventure game Stellar Blade, which was released on April 26, 2024.

Shift Up went public on South Korea’s KOSPI in July 2024, raising $320 million.
