= Seyoung D&C =

Korean video game developer and publisher

- Logo used before renaming the company into Seyoung D&C on August 11, 2021
- Traded as: KRX: 052190
- Industry: Video games
- Founded: October 28, 1994
- Headquarters: Korean
- Key people: Jeong Young-Won (CEO)
- Number of employees: 130 (As of 2010)
- Subsidiaries: Kim Jong-hak Production (2018-present); OH!BROTHERS Production (2018-present)
- Website: ESA.co.kr

Seyoung D&C, formerly known as ESA and Softmax, is a Korean video game developer and publisher and entertainment company. They are best known for their War of Genesis series, Magna Carta series, and MMORPG TalesWeaver. It is currently listed in the Korea Stock Exchange.

== War of Genesis ==
War of Genesis
- Developer: Softmax
- Publisher: Softmax

The War of Genesis (Korean: 창세기전) is a SRPG series developed by Softmax. The series follows the history of Antaria, a fictional universe where the story is taking place. Even though the developers had stated that the third and fourth installments were spin-offs, they follow the main storyline and have many elements that are essential in understanding the stories of the later games. The Side Stories have a rather different gameplay than that of the original. In contrast to the original games' use of the SRPG type of gameplay, Rhapsody of Zephyr uses a classical Japanese RPG style similar to that of the Final Fantasy series. Tempest also uses different gameplay. In addition to battles, there are mini-games and simulation elements as well.

- The War of Genesis (1995)
- The War of Genesis II (1996)
- The War of Genesis Side Story I: Rhapsody of Zephyr (1998)
- The War of Genesis Side Story II: Tempest (1998)
- The War of Genesis III (1999)
- The War of Genesis III Part.2 (2000)
- The War of Genesis Arena (On-line) (2000–2004)
- The War of Genesis Mobile: Crow I (2004)
- The War of Genesis Mobile: Crow II (2005)
- The War of Genesis Mobile: Crow II (2005)
- The War of Genesis (2019)
- The Play of Genesis (2025)

== MagnaCarta ==
MagnaCarta
- Genres: Fantasy; Role-playing
- Developer: Softmax
- Publishers: Softmax; Sony Computer Entertainment; Banpresto; Atlus; 505 GameStreet; Namco Bandai Games
- Artist: Hyung-tae Kim
- Composer: Sung-woon Jang
- Platforms: Windows, PlayStation 2, PlayStation Portable, Xbox 360
- First release: Magna Carta: The Phantom of Avalanche; 2001
- Latest release: MagnaCarta 2; 2009

MagnaCarta is a series of three South Korean role-playing video games developed by Softmax. It features characters designed by artist Hyung-tae Kim.

=== MagnaCarta: Crimson Stigmata (2004) ===
Magna Carta: Crimson Stigmata is a "port" of the original game to the PlayStation 2. Though the game retains multiple elements from its original counterpart, including the main character and several plot elements, other points in Crimson Stigmata—notably the setting and storyline—are very different from The Phantom of Avalanche.

== Reception ==
=== Magna Carta series ===
Video game	Metacritic
Magna Carta: The Phantom of Avalanche	
Magna Carta: Crimson Stigmata	66%
MagnaCarta 2	69%

The Magna Carta series has received mixed reception for Crimson Stigmata and MagnaCarta 2.
