= Shirvani =

Shirvani or Shervani may refer to:

- Shirvani, Fars, Iran
- Shirvani, West Azerbaijan, Iran
- Shirvani Arabic, extinct variety of Arabic spoken in Shirvan
- Shirvani (name), Iranian surname
- Sherwani, a type of knee-length Indian coat
- Sherwani (surname)

== See also ==
- Shirvan (disambiguation)
- Shirani (disambiguation)
