= Shirani =

Shirani, or Sherani, may refer to:

- Shirani (Pashtun tribe), a Pashtun tribe of Afghanistan and Pakistan
- Shirani (Baloch tribe), a Baloch tribe
- Sherani District, in Balochistan, Pakistan
- Shirani, Salmas, a village in Iran
- Shirani, Sardasht, a village in Iran
- Shirani, character portrayed by Bimal Oberoi in the 2025 Indian film Dhurandhar

== People with the name ==
- Akhtar Sheerani (1905–1948), Urdu-language poet
- Hafiz Mehmood Khan Shirani (1880-1946), Indian scholar
- Sain Kamal Khan Sherani (1924–2010), Pakistani politician and leader of the Pakhtunkhwa Milli Awami Party
- Maulana Muhammad Khan Sherani (born 1938), Pakistani politician
- Shirani Bandaranayake (born 1958), former Chief Justice of Sri Lanka

== See also ==
- Shiran (disambiguation)
- Shirane (disambiguation)
- Shiranui (disambiguation)
- Shirvani (disambiguation)
