= Shiran =

Shiran (Persian: شيران) may refer to:

- Shiran, Ardabil
- Shiran, East Azerbaijan
- Shiran Khalji, second Muslim governor of Bengal (d. 1208)
- Shiran Fernando, Sri Lankan cricketer
- Shiran Ratnayake, Sri Lankan cricketer

== See also ==
- Shirán, Peru
- Sheran, a surname
- Shirani (disambiguation)
