= Shirani, Iran =

Shirani (Persian: شيراني) in Iran may refer to either of the two villages:

- Shirani, Salmas
- Shirani, Sardasht
