= Neelamani Devi =

Indian craftswoman and master potter

- Born: 1 September 1938 (age 87); Thongjao Keithel Leikai, Thoubal District, Manipur, India
- Died: Thongjao Manipur
- Occupation: Master potter
- Known for: Pottery arts
- Spouse: Naorem Shyamjai Singh
- Parent(s): Kharaibam Devasingh Singh; Kharaibam Ongbi Sanajaobi Devi
- Awards: Padma Shri; Tulsi Samman Award; National Award for Master Craftsman; Samaj Kalyan Seva award Lions Karmayogi Award

Neelamani Devi is an Indian craftswoman and master potter from Manipur. Her creations have been the theme of two documentary films; Mittee aur Manab by renowned filmmaker, Mani Kaul, and Nilamani: The Master Potter of Manipur, by Aribam Syam Sharma. The TV Series, Mahabharata also featured her works on one of the episodes. The Government of India awarded her the fourth highest civilian honour of the Padma Shri, in 2007, for her contributions to the art of pottery making.

== Biography ==
Neelamani Devi was born to Kharaibam Devasingh Singh and Kharaibam Ongbi Sanajaobi on 1 September 1938 at Thongjao Keithel Leikai, Thoubal District in the northeast Indian state of Manipur and received the early lessons in pottery making from her mother. She lost her parents during childhood, but with sponsorship from the Khadi and Gram Udyog Mandal, continued her studies at Somthal Pargana, Bihar and completed her training in 1960. Her career started as a demonstrator at the Directorate of Industries of the Government of Manipur, but left the job and returned to her village to start Pottery Training Cum Production Centre in 1966. There, she trained the local women in pottery making which is known to have helped them to earn their livelihoods.

Devi has traveled in India and abroad with her works; she has been a member of the Indian delegation who participated in the Five Indian Artisans exhibition and demonstration at the Museum of Ethnography, Sweden, as a part of the Festival of India. She also participated in exhibitions and demonstrations at several places in Japan such as the Hyōgo Prefectural Museum of Art, Kobe, (The Art of the Adivasi), Tobacco and Salt Museum, Tokyo, Tougen Museum, Shirane and Yamanasi, Saitama Prefectural Museum of History and Folklore, and Mithila Museum, Tokamachi and Nigata (Indian Adivasi Art Exhibitions). In 1986, renowned filmmaker, Mani Kaul, made a documentary film on Devi, titled Mittee aur Manab and Aribam Syam Sharma followed suit in 2003, with his non-feature film, Nilamani: Master Potter of Manipur, made for Doordarshan, Guwahati. One of the episodes of the Indian TV series, Mahabharata and the first three episodes of Mahabharata TV series made by French Television featured her pottery creations. The details of her work have also been documented in print in a book, Other Masters : Five Contemporary Folk and Tribal Artists of India, published in 1998 by the Handicrafts and Handlooms Exports Corporation of India. The book is a prescribed text for academic studies at University of Goa.

Devi received two awards in 1986, the National Award for Master Craftsman with a Certificate of Honour from the Government of India and Tulsi Samman Award from the Government of Madhya Pradesh. During 2005–2006, she received two more awards, Samaj Kalyan Seva award during her trip to Sweden and the Karmayogi Award from the Lions Club International. The Government of India honoured again, in 2007, by including her in the Republic Day honours list for the civilian award of the Padma Shri.

== See also ==
- Aribam Syam Sharma
- Mani Kaul
