= Shirvaneh =

Shirvaneh (Persian: شيروانه) may refer to:

- Shirvaneh, Kamyaran
- Shirvaneh, Qorveh

== See also ==
- Shirvan (disambiguation)
