= Amaterasu (Ōkami) =

Fictional character in Ōkami video game

- Ōkami character
- Amaterasu as she appears in Marvel vs. Capcom 3: Fate of Two Worlds
- First game: Ōkami (2006)
- Created by: Hideki Kamiya
- Designed by: Hideki Kamiya

In-universe information
- Species: Wolf
- Gender: Female

Amaterasu (Japanese: アマテラス), also known as Ōkami Amaterasu (大神天照), is a fictional character from Capcom's video game Ōkami. She (Note: Amaterasu is described in the Japanese and European versions of the game as a female; in the North American version, the character is genderless.) is a white wolf based on the Japanese goddess, Amaterasu (天照大御神, Amaterasu-ōmikami), in Japanese mythology. Amaterasu also appears in the Marvel vs. Capcom series and Asura's Wrath.

Since debuting in Ōkami, Amaterasu has garnered mostly positive reception from both video game publications and fans, citing her striking character design, positive influence on rejuvenating the world around her with life and assisting others, and her endearing behavior despite her lack of speech. Her depiction as a deity and use of the mystical Celestial Brush were noted as helping to inform players about aspects of Shintoism and calligraphy.

== Concept and creation ==
Amaterasu was created for the video game Ōkami. She appears as a typical white wolf to outside observers, but her true form, visible to the player and those with beliefs of Asian mythology, depicts her with red markings and fur curlicues, as well as her weapon, typically depicted as the Divine Retribution Reflector, one of a class of weapons based on ancient bronze mirrors. The designers were originally going to give Ōkami a realistic style until they drew Amaterasu in a Japanese style.

The nature of Amaterasu as a wolf is based on the double entendre of the word Ōkami, which means "great god" when rendered in kanji, but can also mean "wolf" when rendered differently. However, it is otherwise entirely fictionalized, as there is no mention of a wolf in any legends or stories involving Amaterasu, nor any story of the deity being commissioned to save the world from a nature-draining evil force.

Amaterasu was originally intended to be the protagonist of Ōkamiden, but they found it difficult to see her when the screen was very zoomed in or out, so they replaced her with the character Chibiterasu, Amaterasu's offspring.

== Appearances ==
=== Ōkami ===
According to the character's backstory, Amaterasu originally existed in the Celestial Plains, ruling over the Celestials and the mortal world as a protector deity. Alongside Waka, she battled Orochi, the eight-headed serpent who attacked and wreaked havoc upon the Celestial Plain. Waka told Amaterasu that Orochi could only be defeated by the Chosen One, a human named Nagi. Hearing this, she dragged Orochi down to the human world to wait for Nagi's birth. Meanwhile, Waka and the remaining Celestials fled into the Ark of Yamato, where all except Waka perished to an ambush of demons led by Yami, the Emperor of Eternal Darkness.

With each passing year, Orochi dined on another maiden from Kamiki Village on the annual festival. Before every festival, Amaterasu appeared around the village in the form of a white wolf. The villagers assumed her to be Orochi's familiar, naming her Shiranui. Eventually, Nagi fought Orochi, and through his combined efforts with Shiranui, he was able to seal Orochi away. Shiranui, however, died from both poisoned wounds inflicted during the battle and protecting Nagi from a falling rock. Taken back to the village, she was hailed as a hero, and a statue was built in her honor. After her death, her Celestial Brush powers had scattered, leaving her drastically weakened, with only her original ability, Sunrise. Furthermore, the peoples' faith in the gods had dwindled, leaving her even weaker.

The main story of the Ōkami begins one hundred years after Shiranui's death. When Nagi's descendant, Susano, removes the sword Tsukuyomi that had sealed Orochi away, Orochi wastes no time in taking over Nippon (Japan) once again. Sakuya, the wood sprite, revived Amaterasu within the statue of Shiranui, giving her the Reflector Divine Retribution. Together with Issun, a loudmouth Poncle found within Sakuya's robe, Amaterasu sets off to revive the Guardian Saplings scattered across Nippon and restore the lands to their original beauty and rid them from evil's hold.

Throughout her journey, Amaterasu is reunited with many of her powers, and regains people's faith in the form of Praise. Eventually, Amaterasu, with the help of Susano, manages to destroy Orochi. She then continues her journey through Nippon, regaining more of her brush techniques, and further restoring people's faith and the lands. Finally, she finds herself in Kamui at the Ark of Yamato. Boarding it with Waka, she finds herself fighting previously defeated demons, including Orochi. Having vanquished them all once again, she finally faces off against Yami. During the battle, Yami manages to strip Amaterasu of all of her powers, but she gradually regains her techniques back, until Yami destroys the Celestial Gods themselves, which destroys her powers, leaving her severely weakened and hovering towards death. With the aid of Issun, who takes up his role as the Celestial Envoy, and all the people she met, who send her praise and prayers, her power is fully restored and she is able to vanquish the evil demon once and for all. She and Waka then return to the Celestial Plain to restore it, and finally bring peace and harmony back to the world.

=== Other video games ===
Outside of Ōkami, Amaterasu appears as a playable character in the fighting game Marvel vs. Capcom 3: Fate of Two Worlds and its update Ultimate Marvel vs. Capcom 3. A costume in Capcom's Monster Hunter Generations based on Amaterasu was offered as part of the game's downloadable content. Similarly, a Palamute costume based on Amaterasu was added to Monster Hunter Rise as part of a crossover event in July 2021. To coincide with the PC release of Ōkami HD, Capcom created and got approval for an Amaterasu "courier" for Valve's Dota 2, given free to those who had pre-ordered Ōkami HD on Steam. In 2020, Amaterasu appeared as a playable hero in Teppen.

Amaterasu will feature in the upcoming sequel to Ōkami, which was announced at The Game Awards 2024.

=== Other Media ===
Amaterasu makes an appearance in the comic book crossover ’’Sonic the Hedgehog/Megaman: Worlds Unite’’, by Archie with Capcom and Sega of America.

== Creation and design ==
Ōkami was originally planned to be rendered in a more photorealistic 3D style, but Clover Studio determined that the more colorful sumi-e style allowed them to better convey Amaterasu's association with nature and the task of restoring it. Amaterasu's initial designs were aimed to avoid having the character look like "your pet wearing clothing". The developers had considered having Amaterasu change into a dolphin when in the water and a falcon when jumping off a cliff, but dropped these ideas.

== Reception ==
The character was very well received by fans and critics alike. In 2010, readers of the Japanese magazine Famitsu voted Amaterasu into eighth place in a poll for the best video game character of all time. In the same year, in a Dengeki poll, she was voted fourth as a character readers wanted to befriend. In a review, IGN's Cam Shea wrote that the game deals with traditional Japanese culture playfully, giving Amaterasu a "delightful duality". While she is a powerful goddess, capable of making vast changes to the world, she is also prone to digging for treasure in the manner of a typical wolf pup. Brittany Vincent of Syfy Wire expressed a similar opinion, explaining that while Amaterasu is "the embodiment of grace and wisdom", she is "still very much a hound that we love to watch do her thing". GamesRadar+ noted that Amaterasu gained a dedicated following despite Ōkami's low sales, saying that her average appearance to most humans played into the game's theme of finding beauty in the mundane. They elaborated that it was "hard not to be taken by her regal, fiery design, as well as her ability to draw over reality".

Louise Grann of 100 Greatest Video Game Characters compared Amaterasu to "a benevolent heroine of an epic fairy tale", noting she helped subtly educate players about the Shinto religion's beliefs and rituals. She stated that Amaterasu's Divine Interventions, in which the player takes on the role of a worshiped deity, made Ōkami a "digital praxis game", or a game resembling devotional practice. Further, Amaterasu's use of the Celestial Brush references calligraphy's connection to spirituality. She called Amaterasu a truly unique character due to her integration of both meditative tradition and honoring nature, though noted that similar characters included Asura from Asura's Wrath and Kratos from God of War, as well as the arctic fox from Never Alone.

In a retrospective, Jeffrey Matulef of Eurogamer stated that playing as Amaterasu "made you feel like an all powerful, rejuvenating goddess", praising Amaterasu's speed compared to Wolf Link in The Legend of Zelda: Twilight Princess. Stating that it was crucial for the player and NPCs to perceive Amaterasu differently in order to make her actions appear spontaneous to outside observers, he noted that "by casting the player as an animal", the game "wisely circumvents the silent protagonist conundrum", saying that Amaterasu's "one-sided conversations" nevertheless felt natural due to her non-human nature.

Her later inclusion in Marvel vs. Capcom 3 was also received positively by fans and critics.
