= Sheerin =

- Language: Irish

Origin
- Meaning: Long lasting
- Region of origin: Ireland

Other names
- Variant forms: Ó Sírín, Ó Síoráin, O'Sheeran, Sheeran, Shearin

Sheerin is an Irish surname. It is a variant of Sheeran, a reduced form of O’Sheeran which is an Anglicized form of Ó Sírín or Ó Síoráin meaning ‘descendant of Sírín/Síorán'. Derived from the personal name Síorán, from a diminutive of síor meaning ‘long-lasting’.

== Surname ==
- Brett Sheerin (born 1977), Australian Stuntman
- Chuck Sheerin (1909-1986), American professional baseball player
- Emma Sheerin (born 1991/2), Northern Irish politician
- Gay Sheerin, Irish Gaelic football goalkeeper and manager
- Joe Sheerin (born 1979), English professional footballer
- Jordyn Sheerin (born 1989), Scottish professional footballer
- Mike Sheerin, Canadian television producer
- Orlagh Máire Sheerin (born 1998), Irish celebrity
- Paul Sheerin (born 1974), Scottish football player and coach
