= Shiranui (disambiguation) =

Shiranui (不知火; lit. "unknown fire") is a Japanese term given to the optical or supernatural phenomenon similar to will-o'-the-wisp; see shiranui. It is also a name associated with:

== People ==
- Shiranui Dakuemon (不知火 諾右衛門; 1801–1854), sumo wrestler, the 8th Yokozuna
- Shiranui Flare (不知火フレア), a virtual YouTuber affiliated with Hololive Production
- Shiranui Kōemon (不知火 光右衛門; 1822–1890), sumo wrestler, the 11th Yokozuna
- Wakakōyū Masaya (若荒雄 匡也; born 1984), sumo wrestler known by the elder name Shiranui

== Characters ==
- Mai Shiranui (不知火 舞), a character in Fatal Fury and the King of Fighters series
- Genma Shiranui (不知火 ゲンマ), one of the Konoha Jonin characters in the anime Naruto
- Shiranui (白野威), the previous incarnation of Amaterasu in Ōkami (however, in this case the kanji means "white wild majesty")
- Genan Shiranui (不知火 幻庵), a character in the Samurai Shodown/Samurai Spirits video game series
- Shiranui (シラヌイ（白野威、【しらぬい】）, Shiranui), A kitten in the protection of Nagi Sanzenin in the Hayate the Combat Butler series
- Shiranui, a fictional mountain and shrine in The Thousand Autumns of Jacob de Zoet
- Kyō Shiranui (不知火 匡), a character in the otome game Hakuōki Shinsengumi Kitan
- Hansode Shiranui (不知火 半袖), a character in the Medaka Box

== Other ==
- Japanese destroyer Shiranui, list of Imperial Japanese Navy destroyers named Shiranui
- Shiranui DDT a professional wrestling move invented by Naomichi Marufuji
- a variety of citrus fruit, known also as Dekopon
- Shiranui-ryū, a school of Japanese martial arts.
- Shiranui, the second awakening of the Kunoichi subclass of the Thief in Dungeon Fighter Online
- Shiranui, a sword given from father to son in a samurai family that is briefly mentioned in the manga Angel Sanctuary
- Shiranui, an archetype in the card game Yu-Gi-Oh!, featuring FIRE type zombies with zero DEF
- Shiranui, a katana with little or no augments, appears in Final Fantasy X
- Genjutsu Shiranui, a jutsu used by Itachi Uchiha in Naruto: Ultimate Ninja series
- Shiranui Sea, a bay (also known as Yatsushiro Sea) south of Ariake Bay in Kyushu, Japan
- Shiranui, one of two "dohyo-iri" types in sumo wrestling that are performed by Yokozuna (grand champions)
- Shiranui, a sub-archetype of the Nubatama clan in Cardfight!! Vanguard focusing on controlling the opponents rearguards.
- A 3rd generation TSF (Mecha) which appears in the Muv-Luv visual novel universe, developed by the Imperial Japanese Forces
