= Japanese destroyer Shiranui =

Three destroyers of Japan have been named Shiranui (不知火, "unknown fire"):

- Japanese destroyer Shiranui (1899), a Murakumo-class destroyer of the Imperial Japanese Navy during the Russo-Japanese War
- Japanese destroyer Shiranui (1938), a Kagerō-class destroyer of the Imperial Japanese Navy during World War II
- JS Shiranui, an Asahi-class destroyer launched in 2017

== See also ==
- Shiranui (disambiguation)
