= Ōkamiden =

2010 video game

- European box art featuring Kuni riding on Chibiterasu, son of the goddess Amaterasu
- Developer: Mobile & Game Studio, Inc.
- Publisher: Capcom
- Director: Kuniomi Matsushita
- Producer: Motohide Eshiro
- Artist: Kenji Endo
- Writer: Yukinori Kitajima
- Composer: Rei Kondoh
- Platform: Nintendo DS
- Release: JP: September 30, 2010; NA: March 15, 2011; AU: March 17, 2011; EU: March 18, 2011
- Genre: Action-adventure
- Mode: Single-player

Ōkamiden, known in Japan as Ōkamiden: Chiisaki Taiyō, (Note: Japanese: 大神伝～小さき太陽～; Ōkami Chronicles: Tiny Sun) is a 2010 action-adventure game developed by Mobile & Game Studio, Inc. and published by Capcom for the Nintendo DS. It is a spiritual successor, rather than a sequel, to Ōkami, a game released originally for the PlayStation 2.

Ōkamiden was designed by Kuniomi Matsushita, the director of the Wii port of Ōkami, and Motohide Eshiro, producer of Ace Attorney Investigations: Miles Edgeworth and Onimusha 2: Samurai's Destiny. It was released in Japan on September 30, 2010, in North America on March 15, 2011, and in Europe on March 18. It stars Chibiterasu, a small celestial wolf born from Amaterasu, the protagonist of Ōkami, and features much of the same gameplay as its predecessor, including the Celestial Brush which allows players to freeze the gameplay and draw shapes or patterns using the touch screen.

Development began when Matsushita expressed an interest in creating a new Ōkami game and showed Eshiro a technical demo of such a game in December 2008. Because the demo was so well-done, development began on a sequel, and in September 2010, four years after Ōkami debuted, the game was released to positive reviews from critics and moderate commercial success.

With the announcement of a sequel to Ōkami at The Game Awards 2024, it is unclear if Ōkamiden is canon or non-canon.

== Gameplay ==
Ōkamiden plays similarly to its predecessor, Ōkami, as an action-adventure game similar to games from The Legend of Zelda series; Zelda was an inspiration for both Ōkami's director Hideki Kamiya and Ōkamiden's producer Motohide Eshiro. The "Celestial Brush", the ability to freeze the screen and draw symbols via the touchscreen with the stylus to bring changes on the game's world, remains central to the game for solving puzzles and fighting enemies. The theme of returning life to the world also returns from Ōkami. A new feature is the ability for Chibiterasu to team up with partners. They can be used to explore the overworld with, as well as battle enemies. The new Guidance technique, also called the "Shirabe" or "courage" brush by Diamond Feit of Wired, may be used to move Chibiterasu's partner independently across areas Chibiterasu cannot cross; this is often required to progress in the game. The game uses the face buttons to move Chibiterasu about the world, with the top display being the current third-person view and the bottom showing a mini-map of the area. By pressing either shoulder button, the Celestial Brush is activated: the game pauses as the top screen is moved down to the bottom and rendered as parchment, and the player then can use the stylus and touchscreen to draw to activate various powers of the Celestial Brush. The game will sense the speed at which the player draws the stylus across the screen and reflect this in the weight of the stroke drawn on-screen; a quick motion will lead to a faint, partial line while slow movements will create bold strokes.

Brush techniques can be used to defeat enemies. Many enemies are weak to one specific brush technique, and by defeating the enemy in this manner, the player can earn rare items that help to upgrade Chibiterasu's power.

Some sections of the game include minigames based on other genres, such as shoot 'em ups and side scrollers.

== Plot ==
The Celestial Brush returns in Ōkamiden, allowing players to interact with the game's world by drawing on the DS' touch screen to evoke special magic such as plant restoration.

Much of Ōkamiden's story centers around the children of previous characters from Ōkami and their adventures and the relationships that form through the game's story, according to producer Motohide Eshiro. The game takes place nine months after the events of Ōkami. Despite Amaterasu's battle against the Dark Lord Yami, which would kill all the demons in Nippon, they return. The Konohana Sprite Sakuya, a character from the original Ōkami, summons the Sun Goddess Amaterasu, but instead finds Chibiterasu, who looks like a young version of Amaterasu. Chibiterasu, as revealed by Matsushita, is, in fact, Amaterasu's son, as was previously speculated. Producer Eshiro noted that he is a "young form of existence" and not fully grown; he retains several abilities of Amaterasu, including the Celestial Brush, but lacks her power, which will be reflected in the plot and gameplay. Matsushita also called Chibiterasu clumsy and having childlike traits of "being tearfully sentimental or not being able to make decisions".

Issun, Amaterasu's partner in the first game, is unavailable to help Chibiterasu as he is busy with his duties as the Celestial Envoy, and thus Chibiterasu is tasked to find other partners to help rid the world of evil. One of the partners that accompanies Chibiterasu is Kuni (クニヌシ, Kuninushi), (Note: In Ōkami, his English name was rendered as Nushi in the concept art.) the adopted son of Susano and Kushi, two characters from Ōkami. Other partners include: Nanami (ナナミ), a young mermaid that is able to swim about in underwater stages and can provide a water source for Waterspout; Kagu (カグラ, Kagura), a spirit medium who helps Chibiterasu see ethereal elements; Kurow (クロウ, Kurō), a flute-playing young boy that bears some traits similar to Waka from Ōkami; and Manpuku (マンプク), an overweight boy carrying fire who can walk through ice spikes and can provide a fire source for the Inferno technique.

Chibiterasu and his various partners initially track down an evil summoner named King Fury (怨霊王, Onryō-ō) that gave rise to the curses across the lands. When Chibiterasu defeats King Fury, they find a stronger evil known as Akuro (悪路王, Akuro-ō), who is seeking to curse the lands of Nippon. To do so, he must acquire the blood from Orochi, the eight-headed demon fought several times in the first game. Akuro travels back one year to when Amaterasu faced down Orochi; Chibiterasu follows it and prevents it from recovering the blood. Furious, Akuro travels back 100 years in time, when the swordsman Nagi and Shiranui, the wolf form that Amaterasu was later given, defeated Orochi. The team travel back in time to follow Akuro. Just before they enter Moon Cave, Kurow leaves the group, claiming to have found his 'True Mission'. The pup, saddened at Kurow's sudden departure, heads on into the cave to fight Akuro. Chibi, however, is unable to prevent Akuro from obtaining the blood this time, as Kurow, who has apparently turned evil and become Akuro's servant, stops Chibiterasu's efforts. Chibiterasu and his other allies follow Akuro to the dark realms where they find the demon has taken up residence in the body of Kuni and that Kurow intends on fighting the pup. Chibiterasu is forced to fight his former partner, expelling Akuro's spirit and freeing Kuni, but evil Kurow willfully allows it to take his body. However, this has been Kurow's plan all the time; he reveals he is a living doll of Waka, with the goal to house Akuro's spirit, such that if he is killed with Akuro inside him, Akuro would be dispelled. Chibiterasu, fighting back tears, complies with Kurow's instructions, and Akuro is destroyed forever. Kurow, just before his death, is sad about how he was nothing but a doll, however, the others reassure him that it was his adventures with Chibiterasu that made him who he was. It was these adventures that made him more than just a doll. Kurow dies happily, surrounded by friends. Afterwards, the remainder of Chibiterasu's partners return to their homes, more confident in their abilities; Kuni leaves home to seek out who he really is, much to Susano's regret. Chibiterasu joins with Issun to return to the Celestial Plain to reunite with Waka and Amaterasu.

Other characters from Ōkami return, including Issun, Mr. and Mrs. Orange, and Sakuya. The game features locales from Ōkami as well as new areas to explore as part of its adventure. Chibiterasu gains Celestial Brush power similar to those from Ōkami, but instead of finding the Celestial Brush Gods hiding in constellations, the player will have to travel to where the Brush Gods have chosen to rest, and acquire the skills from the Gods' children.

== Development ==
Due to poor sales, Ōkami was considered a commercial failure on the PlayStation 2, and while it was widely believed to be one of the factors involved in the closure of its developer, Clover Studio, Hideki Kamiya, lead designer of Ōkami, specified that producer Atsushi Inaba had had an argument with Capcom management. Kamiya commented that he had an idea in mind for the sequel and would enjoy making it, but it was nothing more than an idea and beyond his control. In July 2007, former Capcom employee Keiji Inafune commented that a Wii port was something he had considered, but it was easier said than done, and they had no plans yet. In spite of this, it received a port for the Wii. Capcom employee Chris Svensson commented that a lot more people would have to buy copies of Ōkami to warrant a sequel's production.

In August 2009, Capcom filed for a Japanese trademark on the name "Ōkamiden" for a video game, a few months prior to the Japan release of the Wii version of Ōkami, which led to speculation about an Ōkami sequel; Ōkamiden may be a shortening or pun for Ōkami Gaiden, translated as "Ōkami Sidestory", or possibly Ōkami Densetsu, which translates to "Ōkami Legend", thus fueling speculation that it may be the long-awaited sequel. The September issue of Famitsu revealed that Ōkamiden: Chiisaki Taiyō was indeed another Ōkami game which was slated to be released by Capcom on the Nintendo DS in 2010 in Japan, though no other release information was provided. The Famitsu article shows gameplay, including combat, and graphics similar to the PlayStation 2/Wii game.

Ōkamiden was directed by Kuniomi Matsushita, who oversaw for the Wii port of Ōkami, and was produced by Motohide Eshiro, who had previously worked on titles such as Onimusha 2: Samurai's Destiny and Ace Attorney Investigations: Miles Edgeworth. Yukinori Kitajima, writer for the critically acclaimed Japanese Wii title, 428: Shibuya Scramble, was the scenario author for Ōkamiden. In December 2008, Matsushita, who had a strong desire to create a sequel to Ōkami, led a small team to develop an advanced prototype. Matsushita showed this demonstration to Eshiro and expressed his desire to go forward on the project, and the project was greenlighted. The team settled on the Nintendo DS due to its portability, allowing players to pick it up and play wherever they wish, as well as the utility of the stylus on the touch screen acting as a brush. Eshiro stated that:

The staff involved with this game has a real clear understanding of what was fun about the original Okami. They have a good understanding of what was important about the visual style and what aspects they need when making this new version so it will transfer well. The work Clover did was amazing; they were really talented people, and I think our staff now is motivated to make a game that lives up to the reputation of the previous Okami.

— Motohide Eshiro

Eshiro further commented that he considered Ōkamiden more of a successor to Ōkami than a sequel, desiring to build upon the world for a franchise on the Nintendo DS platform. While Ōkamiden is a DS title, Eshiro has considered to expand subsequent games to work with the Nintendo 3DS unit based on the game's reception. Similarly, Eshiro does not rule out a high-definition version on a modern console or a version for the iPhone or similar touch-screen devices depending on the response to Ōkamiden.

Several changes were made to the basic elements of Ōkami to make Ōkamiden suitable for the Nintendo DS. With fewer controls on the DS unit, the player only controls the movement of the characters in the game, with the camera set in an "on rails" manner to make sure the player was focused on the right areas to head toward. One change made from Ōkami was the simplification of the combat system, a factor that some players had found difficult; Ōkamiden reduces the melee weapon attack features down to a single button, but the Celestial Brush can still be used alongside this for complex strategy. While the developers could have removed the melee attacks completely, allowing the player to defeat enemies with the Celestial Brush alone, they felt that the lack of melee attacks slowed down the game, instead opting for players to melee and then finish off foes with a Celestial Brush flourish. The idea of partners and using the stylus to guide them came about through the intention of having puzzles in the game that incorporated the use of the DS touchscreen. While there were significantly more Celestial Brush strokes and puzzles the team wished to add, they left these out in the final version, feeling they had added too much padding to the game. The number of polygons and the resolution of the artwork was prohibitively limited on the DS version, challenging the artists to convey similar imagery and emotions that were in the first game.

The game was originally going to feature Amaterasu, the protagonist goddess-wolf character from Ōkami; during character planning, one of the artists drew what Amaterasu's child would look like as a joke, but this spurred several ideas for Matsushita, such as the concept of a partner, and leading to Chibiterasu becoming the main character. As Chibiterasu was still a child, the team thought "it would take more than a child to save the world", according to Matsushita, and led to the inclusion of partners both in the game's story and gameplay. This option was selected over several arrangements of characters, such as having five different Chibiterasus team up as a party. Using a story taken from a child's point of view as they explore and learn new things made the game much easier to visualize (and incidentally fell in line with the core demographic of Nintendo handheld devices). Esohiro compared such a first-person narrative to the film Stand by Me. Eshiro also felt it was important to include making friends and having to say goodbye as part of this adventure, striking a strong emotional aspect to the game. As such, Chibiterasu is only paired with one partner at any one time, as Matsushita said "if you could switch between them any time you wanted, then they wouldn't be partners anymore". Included was the death of one of the major characters in the game, which Matsushita found necessary to improve the story's flow; the developers had looked to Ōkami and noted while characters also died there, they did not have any emotional attachment for the player; there was resistance in the development team toward the idea of a major character dying permanently in Ōkamiden, but it was ultimately decided it would improve the story.

The game takes place nine months after the events of Ōkami, which posed story problems for Yukinori Kitajima, Ōkamiden's main scriptwriter. The team originally intended to take the game several years in the future, but found by keeping a closer time frame things would not change as much from the previous game, giving a familiar feeling to those that played Ōkami. Kitajima had to create a rationale for some events, such as why no characters remember the end of Ōkami, or why Susano's son, Kuni, is a young boy although he did not exist during the timeline of Ōkami.

Ōkamiden was first shown in playable form at the Tokyo Game Show in September 2009, where it was reported to have been about 25% completed. Occidental releases were uncertain until it was observed that Capcom had trademarked the name Ōkamiden in both North American and European markets. In April 2010, at its "Captivate" event, Capcom confirmed the game would be released to the aforementioned markets no later than 2011.

=== Promotion ===
A "Collector's Edition" of Ōkamiden was released in Japan alongside the normal game; in addition to the game this version includes a soundtrack, a DVD, a storybook, a plush Chibiterasu keychain, and Ōkamiden-branded earphones. A series of television advertisements in Japan for Ōkamiden feature model Kii Kitano and a white Shiba Inu puppy named Moran-chan that bears a close resemblance to Chibiterasu. North American pre-order bonuses included an Ōkamiden-stylized screen cleaner and brush-shaped stylus at GameStop and a plush Chibiterasu key chain (identical to the Japanese collector's edition) at the Capcom Store.

== Reception ==
=== Pre-release ===
The protagonist of Ōkamiden, Chibiterasu, has received significant media attention for his appearance.

The decision to put Ōkamiden on the Nintendo DS has received mixed reactions. The Escapist editor John Funk stated that it was the perfect platform for the sequel, due to how the touch screen could be used effectively for the Celestial Brush. Kombo editor Daniel Sims praised Ōkamiden's cel-shaded visuals, stating that they work well on the Nintendo DS. Destructoid editor Hamza Aziz believed it was perfect for the Nintendo DS. Aziz added that he was impressed with Capcom managing to retain Ōkami's stylized appearance in the sequel. Siliconera editor Ishaan Sahdev, however, was skeptical that Ōkamiden could replicate the feel that Ōkami provided, due to how much it relied on its visuals and art style to bring players into its world. He also criticized the reasoning behind placing it on the Nintendo DS, which was to reach a larger audience, calling the visuals terrible. He later questioned whether its faults may hurt it enough that the project may not even have been worth it. Kotaku editor Luke Plunkett expressed disappointment that it was a Nintendo DS game rather than a PlayStation 3 game.

There had been skepticism about developing Ōkamiden without PlatinumGames, a developer featuring key members of Clover Studio, including Hideki Kamiya, the developer behind Ōkami. MTV editor John Constantine worried about this, questioning whether the lack of Kamiya and PlatinumGames would make the game feel like a rehash.

Demos of Ōkamiden, both the Japanese version at the Tokyo Game Show in 2009 and the English-language version at various events in the United States, were positively received by critics. Kotaku editors Stephan Totilo and Brian Crecente praised the demo versions they played in April and May 2010; Totilo considered the game a strong match for the DS and was not only "a kind of game made for the DS" but also "the kind of game for which [he] thought the DS was made", while Crecente believed that the drawing mechanism from Ōkami worked even better in Ōkamiden due to the use of the stylus and the nature of holding the portable console like a book. Daniel Feit of Wired believed that while the graphics were not as good as the original game on the PlayStation 2, the "cartoony graphics are well suited to the Nintendo DS".

IGN described the character of Chibiterasu as "adorable". Destructoid editor James Stephanie Sterling concurred, joking that its cuteness would make Ōkamiden one of the greatest Nintendo DS games ever made. Luke Plunkett commented that despite his reservations for Ōkamiden, his "heart melted" when he saw Chibiterasu.

During E3 2010 Ōkamiden received a great deal of praise and awards from news outlets. It was nominated for "Best Handheld Game" for the Game Critics Awards, and "Best DS Game" by IGN. GameSpy named it their "DS Game of Show".

=== Release ===
Reception

Aggregate score
Aggregator	Score
Metacritic	82/100

Review scores
Publication	Score
1Up.com	B+
Destructoid	8/10
Edge	8/10
Eurogamer	8/10
Game Informer	8.75/10
GamePro	4/5
GameSpot	7.5/10
GameSpy	4/5
GamesRadar+	3.5/5
GameTrailers	8.5/10
GameZone	7/10
IGN	8.5/10
Joystiq	3.5/5
Nintendo Life	9/10
PALGN	8.5/10
RPGamer	3.5/5

Famitsu rated Ōkamiden a total score of 34 out of 40 points. The reviewers praised the ability to bring in the elements of Ōkami to the DS but noted that there was little surprise as there was with Ōkami as the DS version covers many of the same elements of the story and gameplay. The Famitsu reviewers did note that the gameplay was not expanded far from the original Ōkami, but posit that it "just shows how complete a package Ōkami was in the first place". GameZone gave the game a 7/10, stating: "There are some players who will undoubtedly love Ōkamiden, either because the flaws (such as backtracking) are not as familiar or because they have the capacity to overlook its myriad mistakes. I wish I could do the same".

Ōkamiden was the third best-selling video game in Japan during its release week at 84,472 copies sold. The game sold an additional 12,829 copies the following week, dropping to number 13 on the charts.
