= Sheeran =

- Language: English

Origin
- Language: Irish
- Derivation: Ó Sírín
- Meaning: 'long lasting'
- Region of origin: Ireland

Other names
- Variant forms: Ó Síoráin, O'Sheeran, Sheerin

Sheeran is an Anglicized Irish surname.

== Origin and variants ==
According to a few sources, the surname is a reduced form of O'Sheeran which is an Anglicized form of Ó Sírín or Ó Síoráin meaning 'descendant of Sírín/Síorán'. Derived from the personal name Síorán, from a diminutive of síor meaning 'long-lasting'.

== People with the surname ==
- Ed Sheeran (born 1991), English singer-songwriter of Irish descent
- Frank Sheeran (1920–2003), labour union official accused of having links to organized crime and of being a hitman
- Jethro Sheeran, British musician and rapper
- Josette Sheeran (born 1954), American NGO executive
- Laura Sheeran (born 1987), Irish singer and musician
- Mark Sheeran (born 1982), English professional football striker
- Michael J. Sheeran (born 1940), American priest and higher education administrator

== See also ==
- Ray Sheeran Field, a rugby facility in San Francisco, California
