= Shirane =

Shirane may also refer to:

- JS Shirane, was the lead ship in the Japan Maritime Self-Defense Force.
- Shirane-class destroyer, a class of destroyers in the Japan Maritime Self-Defense Force
- Mount Nikkō-Shirane, a shield volcano in Nikkō National Park, Japan
- Mount Kusatsu-Shirane, an active volcano in Kusatsu, Gunma, Japan
- Minami-Alps, Yamanashi, the new name for Shirane town in Japan

== Japanese surname ==
- Ayao Shirane (白根 斐夫; 1916–1944), Imperial Japanese Navy officer
- Gen Shirane (1924–2005), Japanese-American physicist
- Haruo Shirane (born 1951), Japanese-American professor of Japanese literature and culture

== See also ==
- Shirani (disambiguation)
