= Shirvan (disambiguation) =

Shirvan is a historical Iranian region in the eastern Caucasus, now in Azerbaijan.

Shirvan or Sirvan or variants may also refer to:

== Places ==
- Şirvan, Azerbaijan
- Şirvan, Shamakhi, Azerbaijan
- Sirvan County, Ilam province, Iran
- Shirvan County, North Khorasan province, Iran
  - Shirvan, Iran
  - Shirvan District
- Shirvan District (Borujerd County), Borujerd County, Lorestan province, Iran
  - Shirvan-e Gharbi Rural District
  - Shirvan-e Sharqi Rural District
  - Shirvan, Lorestan
- Sirvan Rural District, Kermanshah province, Iran
- Şirvan District, in Siirt Province
- Şirvan, Siirt, seat of Şirvan District, Turkey
- Shirvan steppe, part of the Kur-Araz Lowland of Azerbaijan
- Lerrnakert, Shirak, formerly Shirvan, Armenia

== Other uses ==
- Emirate of Şirvan, a Kurdish emirate
- Sirvan Khosravi (born 1982), an Iranian singer

== See also ==
- Shirvani (disambiguation)
- Shirvaneh (disambiguation)
- Sirwan (disambiguation)
- Shirvanshah, former rulers of Shirvan
