= Sheran =

Sheran is a surname. Notable people with the surname include:

- John Sheran (born 1960), Scottish footballer and manager
- Kathy Sheran (born 1947), American politician
- Nicholas Sheran (1841–1882), American businessman
- Robert Sheran (1916–2012), American lawyer, politician, and judge

== See also ==
- Sheeran
