= Shirvani (name) =

Shirvani is an Iranian surname and given name.

== Surname ==
Notable people bearing the surname include:

- Arif Shirvani, 18th-century Azerbaijani-language poet
- Bahman Shirvani, Iranian footballer
- Hamid Shirvani, Iranian architecture scholar
- Mohammad Shirvani, Iranian alternative filmmaker
- Jamal Khalil Shirvani, Iranian poet
- Zayn al-Abidin Shirvani, Iranian scholar and traveler
- Halimi Shirvani, 16th-century Iranian poet

== Given name ==
Notable people bearing the given name include:

- Shirvani Muradov, Degestani Russian wrestler
- Shirvani Chalaev, Dagestani composer in Russia
