= Shirvaneh, Qorveh =

Shirvaneh شيروانه
- Village
- Location within Iran
- Coordinates: 34°58′40″N 47°52′44″E
- Country: Iran
- Province: Kurdistan
- County: Qorveh
- Bakhsh: Chaharduli
- Rural District: Chaharduli-ye Gharbi

Population (2006)
  - Total: 412
- Time zone: UTC+3:30 (IRST)
  - Summer (DST): UTC+4:30 (IRDT)

Shirvaneh (Persian: شيروانه, also Romanized as Shīrvāneh and Shirwaneh) is a village in Chaharduli-ye Gharbi Rural District, Chaharduli District, Qorveh County, Kurdistan province, Iran. At the 2006 census, its population was 412, in 91 families. The village is populated by Kurds.
