= Shirvani, Fars =

Shirvani شيرواني
- Village
- Location within Iran
- Coordinates: 30°05′28″N 52°02′03″E
- Country: Iran
- Province: Fars
- County: Sepidan
- Bakhsh: Hamaijan
- Rural District: Hamaijan

Population (2006)
  - Total: 46
- Time zone: UTC+3:30 (IRST)
  - Summer (DST): UTC+4:30 (IRDT)

Shirvani (Persian: شيرواني, also Romanized as Shīrvānī; also known as Shīrūnī) is a village in Hamaijan Rural District, Hamaijan District, Sepidan County, Fars province, Iran. At the 2006 census, its population was 46, in 12 families.
