= Michael J. Sheeran =

Michael J. Sheeran, S.J.
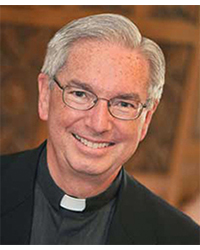

President of the Association of Jesuit Colleges and Universities
- Incumbent
- Assumed office April 1, 2013
- Preceded by: Gregory F. Lucey, S.J.

23rd President of Regis University
- In office January 1, 1993 – May 31, 2012
- Preceded by: David M. Clarke, S.J.
- Succeeded by: John P. Fitzgibbons, S.J.

Personal details
- Born: 1940 (age 85–86) New York City

Michael J. Sheeran, S.J., (born 1940) is a Jesuit priest, former president of the Association of Jesuit Colleges and Universities (AJCU), former president of Regis University in Denver, Colorado, and author of the book Beyond Majority Rule: Voteless Decisions in the Society of Friends.

Sheeran was born in New York City in 1940, and entered the Society of Jesus at Florissant, Missouri, in 1957. He was ordained a Catholic priest in 1970.

In 1968, Sheeran became interested in the Religious Society of Friends, also known as Quakers, while studying religious communities which practice "communal discernment", a decision-making process which the Jesuit order also utilized when it was founded in 1540, but lost within a few generations.

During his doctoral work in the politics department at Princeton University, Sheeran spent two years conducting interviews, reading, and observing the communal discernment tradition, as exemplified in the voteless decisions of Quakers in their Philadelphia Yearly Meeting. This resulted in his book Beyond Majority Rule, which was published in 1983.

Sheeran received his doctorate in politics from Princeton in 1977. He also holds a Licentiate (European equivalent of a master's degree) in Sacred Theology, a Licentiate in Philosophy, a master's degree in political science, a master's degree in Moral and Pastoral Theology and a bachelor's degree in Philosophy and Letters. All are from St. Louis University.

Sheeran has taught at St. Louis University and at Regis Jesuit High School in Denver. He joined Regis University in 1975, and in 1993 became its president. He assumed his current position at AJCU in early 2013 and soon after hosted a historic meeting of college and university presidents, chairs of board of trustees, and the Superior General of the Society of Jesus, Rev. Adolfo Nicolás, S.J. He also hosted the first meeting of President Bill Clinton and Pope John Paul II while president at Regis.

Fr. Sheeran serves on the boards of trustees of Saint Louis University and John Carroll University. He has previously served as a trustee with the University of San Francisco, the Regis Jesuit High School Board in Denver, the Saint John Vianney Seminary Board (Archdiocese of Denver), the Executive Committee of the Association of Jesuit Colleges & Universities, National Board of Campus Compact, Rocky Mountain College of Art and Design, Rockhurst University, Creighton University, Loyola University New Orleans, the Colorado Institute of Technology Board of Directors, the Association of Catholic Colleges and Universities (ACCU) Board of Directors, Community College of Aurora Advisory Council, and as chairman of the board for Mile High United Way.
