= Sain Kamal Khan Sherani =

Pakistani politician

Sain Kamal Khan Sherani سايي کمال خان شیراني

Personal details
- Born: 3 January 1924 Zhob, British India
- Died: 5 November 2010 (aged 86) Sherani, Balochistan, Pakistan
- Resting place: Sherani, Pakistan
- Party: Pakhtunkhwa Milli Awami Party
- Children: 6
- Parent: Esa Khan
- Education: Islamia College University, Peshawar
- Profession: Politician
- Known for: Political activism

Sain Kamal Khan Sherani (Pashto:سايي کمال خان شیراني) (3 January 1924 – 5 November 2010) was the founding member and leader of Pakhtunkhwa Milli Awami Party a democratic Pashtun nationalist political party in Pakistan.

Sain Kamal Khan Sherani was born in district Zhob British India village shina ponga (شنه پونګه) in middle class Sherani tribe family. His father name was Esa Khan and he has business in Delhi. Sain has three brothers named Mutha Khan, Ibrahim Khan, Nawab Khan and has two sisters. He has six children in number five sons and only daughter.

== Education ==
Kamal Khan Sherani got his basic education from a nearby primary school karama malik Balo khan karmanzai Zhob and in 1939 he got admission in "Sandeman High School Quetta" by scholarship. After completing his Matriculation, in 1940 he proceeded to Islamia College University Peshawar, obtaining an Honours degree in Economics.

== Political career ==
Sain Kamal Khan Sherani was the closest companion of Khan Shaheed Abdul Samad Khan Achakzai.
