= Halimi Shirvani =

Halimi Shirvani (Persian: حلیمی شیراوانی) was a 16th-century poet in Safavid Iran and the Ottoman Empire, who wrote in Persian. He composed a divan (collection of poems) of 6550 verses, but it has not been studied yet, its only copy being preserved in the Lala Ismail Library in Turkey.

Not much is known about Halimi. Born in April 1506 in Shirvan, he was a Sunni Muslim and claimed to be descended from the Sasanian ruler Khosrow I (r. 531–579) and the Kayanian dynasty. Between 1537 and 1539, he travelled to the Gilan province and city of Qazvin. In 1540/41 he performed a pilgrimage to Mecca. He afterwards visited al-Aqsa in Jerusalem, and then remained in Ottoman Syria for the rest of his life. Based on his poems. he had economic issues. Halimi used the poetry of his predecessors, particularly the 12th-century Anvari and 13th-century Saadi Shirazi, into his own writings because he was acquainted with their poetry. He wrote a commentary on the Masnavi-e-Ma'navi of the 13th-century Persian poet Rumi.

== Sources ==
- Mohammadi, Farzad; Kakimazar, Mohammad; Rezaporian, Asghar (2020). "A study on the life and works of an anonymous poet from Shirvan, Azerbaijan". Journal of Persian Language & Literature (Former Journal of the Faculty of Literature, University of Tabriz) (in Persian). 73 (241): 213–235.
