= Ōkami =

2006 video game

- North American PlayStation 2 cover art
- Developer: Clover Studio (Note: Wii version developed by Ready at Dawn and Tose. HD version developed by HexaDrive.)
- Publisher: Capcom
- Director: Hideki Kamiya
- Producer: Atsushi Inaba
- Designer: Hiroshi Shibata
- Programmer: Ryuta Takahashi
- Artists: Sawaki Takeyasu; Kenichiro Yoshimura; Mari Shimazaki; Naoki Katakai; Ikumi Nakamura
- Writer: Hideki Kamiya
- Composers: Masami Ueda; Hiroshi Yamaguchi; Rei Kondoh; Akari Kaida
- Platforms: PlayStation 2; Wii; Ōkami HD; PlayStation 3; Windows; PlayStation 4; Xbox One; Nintendo Switch
- Release: 20 April 2006: PlayStation 2; JP: 20 April 2006; NA: 19 September 2006; EU: 9 February 2007; AU: 14 February 2007 Wii; NA: 15 April 2008; AU: 12 June 2008; EU: 13 June 2008; JP: 15 October 2009 Ōkami HD; PlayStation 3; NA: 30 October 2012; EU: 31 October 2012; JP: 1 November 2012 Windows; WW: 12 December 2017; JP: 13 December 2017 PlayStation 4, Xbox One; WW: 12 December 2017; JP: 21 December 2017 Nintendo Switch; WW: 9 August 2018; JP: 4 September 2018 Amazon Luna; US: 20 April 2022
- Genre: Action-adventure
- Mode: Single-player

Ōkami (Note: Japanese: 大神; [oːkamʲi] lit. "great god" or "great spirit"; also 狼, "wolf" (the name is a pun that can be seen as either)) is a 2006 action-adventure game developed by Clover Studio and published by Capcom. It was released for PlayStation 2 in 2006 in Japan and North America, and in 2007 in Europe and Australia. After the closure of Clover Studio a few months after the release, a port for Wii was developed by Ready at Dawn, Tose, and Capcom, and released in 2008.

Set in a fictional version of classical Japan, Ōkami combines Japanese mythology and folklore to tell the story of how the land was saved from darkness by the Shinto sun goddess Amaterasu, who took the form of a white wolf. It features a sumi-e-inspired cel-shaded visual style and the Celestial Brush, a gesture-system to perform miracles. The game was planned to use more traditional realistic rendering, but this had put a strain on the graphics processing of the PlayStation 2. Clover Studio switched to a cel-shaded style to reduce the processing, which led to the Celestial Brush concept. The gameplay is modeled on The Legend of Zelda, one of director Hideki Kamiya's favorite series. The game's name is a pun, as "ōkami" can mean either "great god" (大神) or "wolf" (狼) in Japanese.

Ōkami was one of the last PlayStation 2 games released prior to the release of the PlayStation 3. It was not commercially successful, leading to the closure of Clover Studio following the departure of Kamiya and other leads on the game. Although it suffered from poor sales, the game received universal acclaim, earning IGN's 2006 Game of the Year. The Wii version earned similar praise, though the motion control scheme received mixed reviews. A high-definition port, remastered by Capcom and HexaDrive, was released on the PlayStation 3 via the PlayStation Network in October 2012 and for retail in Japan in November, supporting the use of the PlayStation Move motion controller. The port was released for PlayStation 4, Windows, and Xbox One in December 2017 worldwide, for the Nintendo Switch in August 2018, and for Amazon Luna in April 2022. Mainstream adoption of the game has improved with the release of these remasters, and Ōkami is considered to be one of the greatest video games of all time, as well as an example of video games as an art form, aided by the improved art details and graphics resolutions.

A spiritual successor on the Nintendo DS, Ōkamiden, was released in Japan in September 2010, followed by North America and Europe in March 2011. A sequel was announced at The Game Awards 2024, with Kamiya returning as director within a new studio, Clovers, in partnership with Capcom.

== Gameplay ==
The player controls the main character, Amaterasu, in a woodcut, watercolor style, cel-shaded environment, which looks like an animated Japanese ink-illustration (known as ink wash painting, or sumi-e) and ukiyo-e, along with other styles of art. The gameplay style is a mix of action, platform, and puzzle gaming genres, and has been noted by many reviewers to have numerous similarities in overall gameplay style to The Legend of Zelda series, an inspiration that director Hideki Kamiya, a self-proclaimed Zelda fan, has admitted has influenced his general game design. The main story is primarily linear, directed by Amaterasu's guide Issun, though numerous side quests and optional activities allow for players to explore the game's open world and take the story at their own pace. By completing quests, side quests, and small additional activities (such as making trees bloom into life or feeding wild animals), Amaterasu earns Praise, which can then be spent to increase various statistics of the character, such as the amount of health and number of ink wells for Celestial Brush techniques.

Combat is staged in a ghostly virtual arena, and Amaterasu can fight enemies using a combination of weapons, fighting techniques and Brush methods to dispatch the foes. At the end of combat, money (as yen) is rewarded to Amaterasu, with bonuses for completing a battle quickly and without taking damage. The money can be spent at merchants and dojos across the land, featuring healing goods, better weapons, tools, key items for completing quests, and combat techniques.

Rare Demon Fangs can be earned through combat which can be traded for unique items that are beneficial in gameplay but not required to complete the game. Weapons inspired by the Imperial Regalia of Japan (the Reflector, the Rosaries, and the Glaive) can be equipped on Amaterasu as either main or sub-weapons (one each), and used in addition to other melee attacks that the player can have Amaterasu learn through the course of the game.

The player uses the Celestial Brush to rejuvenate wilted plants (as shown), repair bridges, slash foes, or create elemental effects.

=== Celestial Brush ===
A game mechanic unique to Ōkami is the Celestial Brush. Players can bring the game to a pause and call up a canvas, where the player can draw onto the screen, either using the left analog stick on the DualShock controller, or pointing with the Wii Remote, Joy-Con, touchscreen, or PlayStation Move controller in subsequent ports. This feature is used in combat, puzzles, and as general gameplay. For example, the player can create strong wind by drawing a loop, cut enemies by drawing a line through them, or fix bridges by painting on the broken one. These techniques are learned through the course of the game by completing constellations to release the Celestial Brush gods (inspired by the Chinese zodiac) from their hiding spots. It is possible to upgrade or modify certain Brush powers later in the game; for example, the Celestial Brush power "Inferno" can gain a new power called "Fireburst", which has a different drawing pattern, and allows players to create flames without relying on torches or other related items. The player's ink for drawing is limited by the amount available in special ink wells, preventing the player from solely using Brush techniques to defeat enemies; ink is restored in the wells over time when the Brush is not used.

== Plot ==
Most character names below are the shortened names of the U.S. version.

=== Characters ===
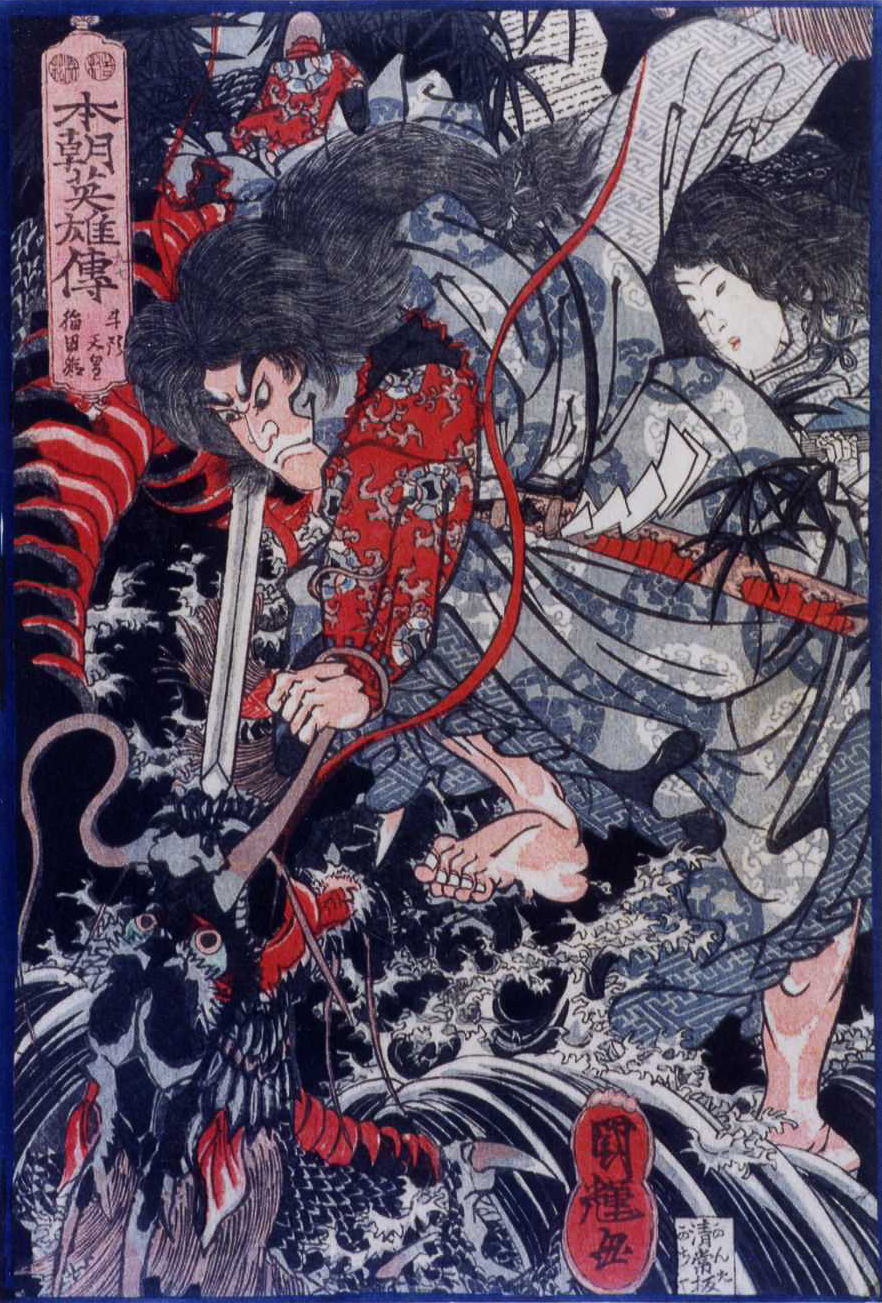
Much of Ōkami centers on characters from Japanese Shinto spirituality and legendary historical figures. A major plot parallels the slaying of the eight-headed serpent, Yamata no Orochi, by the Shinto god Susanoo, recreated within the game as the characters of Orochi and Susano, respectively.

The player controls Ōkami Amaterasu, the goddess of the sun, in the form of a white wolf. Amaterasu is referred to in the Japanese and European version of the game as a female, while in the North American version she is genderless although she is referred as the "mother of all". When endowed with ink power, Amaterasu is seen by the player with red markings, cloud-like fur on her shoulders, and weapons on her back. Most of the human characters in the game only see her as a plain white wolf; some believe Amaterasu to be the reincarnation of Shiranui (the white wolf that fought Orochi 100 years prior to the game's present), and do not recognize her spiritual nature. If the player depletes power by overuse of the Celestial Brush, Amaterasu will temporarily revert to this mundane white form. Issun, an arrogant, inch-tall "wandering artist" seeking out the thirteen Celestial Brush techniques for himself, accompanies Amaterasu (whom he calls "Ammy" or "furball"). He serves as a guide, dialogue proxy, and as comic relief. He grows in character along with Ammy throughout the game, becoming her true friend, inspiration, and eventually her savior.

At the end of the game, Amaterasu encounters Yami, the main antagonist and final boss of the game who resembles a small fish inside a huge sphere, whose design is altered through the different stages of the battle. Yami is also the ruler of the demons. Before battle, he drains Amaterasu of her powers and leaves her as a plain white wolf. Amaterasu regains her powers throughout the fight, but, after the fourth round, Yami destroys them all again and leaves Amaterasu in a near-dead state. However, when Issun gets everyone to believe in Amaterasu before the fifth and final round, she changes into her most powerful form and battles Yami, vanquishing him forever. In the final battle, Yami has a huge clawed hand, which demonstrates the evil which comes from humans' hands. The word "Yami" means "darkness" in Japanese.

Two other characters reappear several times within the quest. Waka appears to Amaterasu several times in the game as a beautiful young flute-playing man in costume resembling a tengu (dressed like a yamabushi). He is aware of the goddess's true identity, foretells her future, and at times battles with her. He leads the Tao Troopers whose members Abe and Kamo are based on two famous onmyōji: Abe no Seimei and Kamo no Yasunori. Waka's dialogue, dropping French affectionate terms at times, conveys a sense of familiarity with Amaterasu, as it turns out that Waka is much older than he appears and has walked with Amaterasu on the Celestial Plain hundreds of years ago. The other is Orochi, the eight-headed demon and a major villain within the game which the player will encounter several times. Orochi repeatedly has threatened Kamiki Village, demanding a sacrifice of a young woman every year on the day of the Kamiki Festival. Each of its eight heads is infused with a different elemental magic power, but the entire demon is susceptible to a special brew of sake available only at Kamiki Village, allowing Amaterasu to defeat it while in its stupor. Amaterasu trusts Queen Himiko, the ruler of "Sei-an City", who is killed by one of the demons.

Throughout the game, the player encounters several other characters that are inspired from Japanese folklore.

=== Story ===
Promotional artwork for the game, showing the main characters. The foreground characters include the white wolf-goddess Amaterasu, the inch-high artist Issun, the mysterious swordsman Waka, and the warrior Susano.

The game is set in Nippon (Japan) and it is based on Japanese folklore, beginning one hundred years in the past. A narrator describes how the white wolf Shiranui and swordsman Nagi fought and sealed the eight-headed demon Orochi at the Moon Cave, to save Kamiki Village and Nagi's beloved maiden Nami.

In the game's present, Nagi's descendant and self-proclaimed greatest warrior, Susano, refuses to believe in Nagi's legend and frees Orochi, who escapes and curses the lands, sapping the life from Nippon. Sakuya, the wood sprite and guardian of Kamiki Village, summons the long-dormant Amaterasu in the form of a reincarnated Shiranui, and asks her to remove the curse that covers the land. Accompanied by the artist Issun (an inch-high creature known as a Poncle), Amaterasu begins to restore the lands to normal state.

Throughout their journey, Amaterasu and Issun encounter Waka, a handsome and strange but powerful individual who seems to have the gift of foresight, and further teases them to his own mysterious ends. Additionally, Amaterasu locates several Celestial Gods hidden in constellations, who bestow upon her their powers of the Celestial Brush to aid in her quest.

After regaining some of her power and reviving the land, Amaterasu and a changed Susano return to the Moon Cave and recreate the events of Shiranui and Nagi's efforts 100 years ago by defeating Orochi in order to save Kushi. Orochi's spirit floats northward, leading Amaterasu and Issun embark on a journey across Nippon to follow it. They first arrive at Ryoshima Coast and Sei-an City, the capital of Nippon; there, they work with the beautiful priestess Rao, the legendary submarine Dragon Kingdom, and the reclusive Queen Himiko to rid the coastline and city of Orochi's remaining influence, which includes stopping a demonic plague and retrieving a mystical weapon from a sunken trading ship. However, it is revealed that the real Rao was killed before Amaterasu arrived, and the Rao they had accompanied was the demonic fox god Ninetails, who kills Himiko and returns to her fortress on the elusive Oni Island. Amaterasu and Issun defeat Ninetails, noticing that her spirit, like Orochi's, travels to the icy northern island of Kamui. The two decide to travel northward to find the source of the demons.

In Kamui, Amaterasu assists the Oina tribe to defeat two recently revived demons, Lechku and Nechku, who were creating a deadly blizzard that threatened to destroy the island. In addition to this, Amaterasu discovers that Issun ran away from his home of Ponc'tan to escape his responsibility of being a Celestial Envoy—a messenger of the gods—and his grandfather; additionally, the duo learn that Shiranui was in fact Amaterasu in a previous incarnation, who sacrificed herself to kill Orochi with the help of Issun's grandfather. After defeating Lechku and Nechku, Amaterasu discovers the wreckage of a flying ship made of iron: the "Ark of Yamato", trapped in the frozen plains of Kamui. Waka appears and reveals himself to be a member of the Moon Tribe, a long-living race who used the Ark to sail the stars. They helped the Celestials—minor and major gods—escape from the Celestial Plain after Orochi invaded, but the demons snuck onto the Ark beforehand, allowing them to kill the rest of the Celestials before the Ark fell to earth, releasing the demons upon the mortal world. Amaterasu boards the Ark alone, defeating the spirits of the felled demons on board. Amaterasu finds Waka in battle with Yami, the machine-esque leader of the demons who led the genocide of the gods ages ago; Waka is knocked unconscious and Amaterasu takes his place. After a long battle, Yami drains her power and nearly destroys the Celestial Gods. Before it can do so, Issun accepts his role as a Celestial Envoy, and encourages all those they have helped to send their thoughts and prayers to Amaterasu, who regains her powers and defeats Yami, ridding Nippon of all demons. Amaterasu and Waka take control on the Ark, and sail back to the Celestial Plain, determined to rebuild the land of the gods.

== Development ==
Ōkami resulted from the combined ideas of Clover Studio. The idea originated from lead designer Hideki Kamiya while he was developing Viewtiful Joe for Capcom. He had seen the new photo realistic game engine being developed for the Resident Evil remake for the GameCube, and wanted to make a game using that engine, but with a more light-hearted theme centered on the concept of healing, and "depict[ing] a lot of nature". Kamiya created a minute-long demonstration movie using this engine, showing a wolf running about a forest, with flowers blossoming in its wake, but still lacking any gameplay. Kamiya and other members of the team introduced ideas around the nature aspect and eventually led to the game's initial prototype, which Kamiya admitted was "incredibly boring to play".

Side-by-side comparison of the original realistic (left) and the final sumi-e (right) style used in Ōkami

While the team successfully used the photorealistic engine to produce initial prototypes, the performance on the target platform, the PlayStation 2, was not great. Further, Kamiya suggested that he allowed so many ideas from the team that resulted in the development moving off-target, including creating more of a simulation. Eventually, they settled onto the gameplay found in the final product. While the team tried to optimize the game engine, character designer Kenichiro Yoshimura drew the wolf character using a brush, which inspired Kamiya and other leads to adopt the Ukiyo-e and sumi-e style, both Japanese watercolor and wood carving techniques used in notable works such as those of Hokusai, and which better conveyed the connection of restoring nature, while also resolving the performance issues. Over a three-day period, the game's leads re-evaluated the game's approach around this new art style, which also included the concept of the Celestial Brush. Atsushi Inaba, CEO of Clover, noted that "once we fixed ourselves on a graphical style and got down to the brushwork, we thought 'Wouldn't it be great if we could somehow get the player involved and participate in this artwork instead of just watching it?' That's how the idea of the Celestial Brush was born". Original concepts for enemies included the use of dinosaurs, but the designs settled onto more demonic characters.

Amaterasu's initial designs were aimed to avoid having the character look like "your pet wearing clothing". The developers had considered having Amaterasu metamorphose into a dolphin when in the water and a falcon when jumping off a cliff, but dropped these ideas. Sakuya, designed around a peach motif, was envisioned with what were called "level 2" and "level 3" designs where the character would wear less clothing as the story progressed, but the "level 3" appearance, effectively naked, was vetoed by Inaba. Waka's character was aimed to be a Tatsunoko-like character, with the hood designed to be reminiscent of those worn by the Gatchaman. Orochi in Japanese mythology is a gigantic creature, so lead character designer Sawaki Takeyasu designed the back of the demon to include a garden and palace; this inspired the game designers to include a bell in those structures that would be Orochi's fatal weakness in the game.

Kamiya stated that Ōkami was intended to have a larger story, but they had run out of time and had to resolve the game with about half of what they wanted to include. In 2024, Kamiya said that while Clover Studios were brought together to be a "dream team", there was strife between the various developers. Ikumi Nakamura, who had worked alongside Kamiya for Ōkami and several previous games, said that the level of enthusiasm for the game was not as uniform as it was compared to Viewtiful Joe or Devil May Cry, leading to struggles with development.

The localization team had to translate 1500 pages of text to make sure it made sense in a "native check", because of lack of plurals in the Japanese language and the large number of characters and conditional conversations that the player could interact with. The team recognized that certain elements of the game would not be recognized by Western audiences, but left enough text and details to allow the players to look up the information for themselves. Only one puzzle in the game had to be changed as it required knowledge of the steps in drawing a kanji character which would be readily known for Japanese audiences; for the Western release, these steps were demonstrated in the game. The team noted that personalities of characters could be easily conveyed in Japanese text simply by the way sentences were constructed or slurred, a feature that could not directly be applied to localization. Instead, working with Kamiya, the team scripted the localization to either recreate the personality to match the Japanese version, or to create a whole new set of mannerisms for the characters as appropriate.

Ōkami was shown at the 2005 E3 Convention, approximately 30% complete, with a planned release in 2006. At this point, the game had much of the core gameplay, including the Celestial Brush and the combat system in place. The game was released a year later, with its release in Japan on 20 April 2006, North America on 19 September 2006, in Europe on 9 February 2007, and in Australia on 14 February. However, just a few weeks following its release in North America to strong critical reception, Capcom announced the closure of Clover Studio.

The Ōkami: Official Complete Works art book was published by Udon in May 2008. The game was re-released under Sony's "Greatest Hits" in Japan in August 2008.

=== Naming and allusions ===
The title of the game is a pun; the word ōkami (狼) in Japanese means "wolf". The kanji characters (大神), pronounced identically, mean "great deity", so the main character is a great wolf deity. Although pronounced differently, the same characters (大神) are used in the honorific name of the Shinto sun goddess Amaterasu (天照大神, Amaterasu-ōmikami).

The localization team opted to use shorter versions of Japanese names (for example, a boy named "Mushikai" was localized as "Mushi") instead of replacing the names with Western-style ones. Issun's informal name for Amaterasu in the Western translation, "Ammy", was inspired by Kamiya, and is similar in tone with the Japanese informal name, "Ammako".

Throughout the game, Ōkami includes several references (in visual effects, animation, or dialogue) to other Capcom games such as Viewtiful Joe, which Clover Studio also developed. For example, Mrs. Orange's technique for making cherry cake parodies Street Fighter's Akuma's Shun Goku Satsu, complete with a kanji word displayed on screen with her back-facing the screen. There are in-jokes regarding the Clover staff. For example, a non-player character aptly named "Animal Lover" lost his rabbit named "Inaba", the last name of the head producer Atsushi Inaba. To further convey the joke, Inaba the rabbit can be seen falling out of a tree directly underneath Atsushi Inaba's name during the closing credits.

=== Audio ===
Ōkami Original Soundtrack

Soundtrack album by Masami Ueda, Hiroshi Yamaguchi, Rei Kondoh, and Akari Kaida
- Released: 31 May 2006
- Genre: Soundtrack
- Label: Suleputer

The music in Ōkami was inspired by classical Japanese works. The final song, played over the credit sequence, "Reset", is sung by Ayaka Hirahara. In May 2006, Capcom released a 5-disc soundtrack for Ōkami in Japan. In the North American and European release, the player can unlock a jukebox to hear the in-game music upon completion of the game. Ōkami won the best score award at the 2007 BAFTA Video Games Awards.

Suleputer has published another album, a piano arrangement, Ōkami Piano Arrange. It was released on 30 March 2007. Mika Matsura both arranged the 10 songs, and performed it on the piano.

With the release of Ōkami HD for the Nintendo Switch, Data Disc prepared a vinyl four-disc compilation of over 60 of the game's musical tracks for release in October 2018.

The characters' speech in the game is created by scrambling samples of voice actors' speech, with more emotional lines being created from voice work given in that emotion.

=== Wii port ===
The cover of the North American Wii version of Ōkami. A watermark from IGN can be seen by Amaterasu's mouth.

The gameplay function of "drawing" or "painting" strokes on the screen led several journalists and gamers alike to believe that Ōkami would be well-suited for the Nintendo DS or Wii, both of which feature controls capable of creating drawing motions freely. After the game's release, industry rumors of the game being ported to either console persisted, though Atsushi Inaba of Clover Studio said that Ōkami's action-based gameplay would not translate well to the console and Capcom stated that there were "no plans for Ōkami on Wii".

However, at the 2007 UK Gamers Day, Capcom announced that Ready at Dawn would oversee porting and development of a Wii version of Ōkami originally scheduled for release in March 2008 but subsequently pushed back to April. Christian Svensson, Capcom's Vice-President of Strategic Planning and Business Development, stated that Capcom had received numerous requests from fans for the development of the Wii version, and that the ported game "specifically exists because of that direct communication, especially those we receive on our message boards (even if they're sometimes mean to us)". Ready at Dawn president Didier Malenfant said that, aside from the control scheme, the Wii version will be "an exact port of the PS2 version". The lack of enhancements for the game caused several complaints from gamers, which Svensson addressed, stating this:

...we're getting the game up and running first. The game is enormous. If after we have every thing working correctly, cleanly and as desired so as not to "break" the amazing experience that is Ōkami, we will worry about potential enhancements. As we are NOT at that point in the process yet, we are loathe [sic] to even mention any potential changes or enhancements for fear of disappointing the fans/media.

Svensson reported that the original game assets given to them from Capcom Japan were incomplete, and even after requesting old hard drives and computers to recover more assets, Ready at Dawn was still required to recreate some from scratch. Furthermore, the game had to be recoded to change optimizations that were made for the PlayStation 2 version; Svensson stated that "part of the reason we didn't show it until we started showing it was because, if we showed it in a form that was anything less than near-perfect, people were going to freak out". Ready at Dawn's creative director Ru Weerasuriya later reflected that porting Ōkami to the Wii was a challenging task—"we started with no assets and literally reverse-engineered the whole thing back onto the Wii"—they did out of love for the game, but the level of effort would preclude them from attempting such a port again.

In November 2007, Svensson said that the engine had been ported to the Wii, writing that "there are still several systems getting set up properly but there's most definitely a Wii-driven Amaterasu running around Wii-rendered environments as we speak". He confirmed that unlike in the PlayStation 2 version, all of the text will be skipable. A listing posted at Capcom's website for the game in February 2008 revealed that the Wii version would support 480p and widescreen output, and IGN confirmed that the motion sensing of the Wii Remote would be used to perform the Celestial Brush features within the game. IGN's hands-on cited small changes to the game such as additional motion-sensing controls using both the Wii Remote and Nunchuck attachment, and the ability to skip cutscenes, but reported no other changes in content of the game.

Svennson noted that Capcom would not use television advertising for Ōkami on the Wii, but would use online marketing, including art contests and a new website with "all sorts of things for fans to use to make stuff". This site was made live on 3 April 2008, featuring wallpapers, character artwork, and fan-created art for the game. Svennson further noted that "if [Ōkami for the Wii] did the numbers that we did on the PS2, I'd be very happy. This doesn't need to be a mainstream success for this to be a success for the company".

A paper parchment filter applied to all on-screen elements that is readily apparent in the PlayStation 2 version is in the Wii version, but the effect is much less significant. To help with drawing with the Celestial Brush, two different buttons on the Wii controllers have brush functionality; one button provides free-form strokes, and the other draws a straight line from the starting point.

Following a delay, the Wii port of Ōkami was released in North America on 15 April 2008, Australia on 12 June, Europe on 13 June, and Japan on 15 October 2009.

The final credits that is in the PlayStation 2 version of the game was removed from the Wii version, much to Kamiya's regret as it removed the omoi, "a combination of thoughts, emotions, and messages": "[The staff roll was] the omoi of everyone who worked on the project, put together in a moment of bliss held out just for those who completed the journey. It was a special staff roll for a special moment. And now it is gone. All of it. ...It's incredibly disappointing and sad". A Capcom representative stated that the credits, a pre-rendered movie, had the Clover Studio logo within it, and they had "no legal right to use the Clover logo in a game they were not involved with directly". Since they lacked the source to the credits, they opted to remove them entirely from the game. Ready at Dawn's co-founder Didier Malenfant claimed that the Wii version of Ōkami took up much more space on the game media than the PlayStation 2 version, and that the movie was cut in order to fit everything on a single game disc. The credit sequence was restored in the Japanese release of the Wii version and revealed that the port was co-developed by Tose, having provided additional planners, designers, programmers, and test players. The images from the credits, although not the credits themselves, are still available as unlockable art.

Players have discovered that the cover of the North American Wii version of Ōkami includes a watermark from IGN, and traced the source to an image taken from IGN's site. To make up for the error, Capcom offered for a limited time to replace the cover with one of three high-resolution covers free of charge to users in North America. Because of delays in fulfilling the offer, Capcom shipped copies of all three covers to those that registered. The company has since discontinued the offer, but has made the cover images available worldwide in high-quality PDF files for users to download and print themselves. The European PAL version of the cover has no such error.

=== High-definition remaster ===
In 2012, Capcom unveiled a high-definition remastering of the game, Ōkami HD (Ōkami Zekkei-ban; roughly translated, Ōkami Magnificent Version), to be released worldwide for PlayStation 3 on 30 and 31 October the same year; a retail product was released in Japan, while the game is available for download through the PlayStation Network in Europe and North America only. The remastered edition supports the PlayStation Move peripheral, and Trophy support has been added. While the remastered edition restored the ending credits sequence of the original PS2 release, the Clover Studio logo was removed and the ending song, "Reset", was replaced on non-Japanese copies by an instrumental remix of the Ryoshima Coast background music. The remastering was done between Capcom and HexaDrive, who had previously worked on the high-definition remastering of Rez.

Capcom later released Ōkami HD for Windows, PlayStation 4, and Xbox One on 12 December 2017 worldwide, built off the PS3 remaster. This version was developed by Buzz Co., Ltd. and Vingt et un Systems Corporation. The Windows, PlayStation 4, and Xbox One versions include both digital and retail editions, and the Xbox One version was released as a download in Japan. This version supports 4K resolutions, though locked at a 30 frames-per-second framerate, and includes an optional widescreen presentation alongside the 4:3 aspect ratio of the original game. The high-definition remaster was released for the Nintendo Switch on 9 August 2018. This version uses the Switch's touchscreen controls for some features including the Celestial Brush, and supports the Joy-Con's motion controls. The Nintendo Switch port has both a standard physical retail and a limited edition release exclusive to Japan, whilst the game is an eShop-exclusive in other regions. A version of the game was released exclusively in the United States for Amazon Luna on 20 April 2022.

=== Related titles ===
==== Ōkamiden ====
Sales of Ōkami were considered somewhat poor for justifying a sequel; in July 2009, in response to users' questions on the possibility of a sequel, Svensson stated that "I think we need a lot more people buying the current version before we seriously consider a sequel". After the appearance of a Japanese trademark by Capcom on the word "Ōkamiden" a few months before the Wii version of Ōkami in Japan, many speculated that a sequel was pending. The September 2009 issue of Famitsu announced that Ōkamiden was indeed a sequel to Ōkami for the Nintendo DS, to be released by Capcom in Japan in 2010, though without the input of the Clover staff. Producer Motohide Eshiro later clarified in an interview that the game is considered a spiritual-successor, rather than a full sequel, to Ōkami. The game takes place nine months after the end of Ōkami, with the player in control of Chibiterasu, a wolf cub with the same powers as Amaterasu, but not yet at his full potential, and features the same style of gameplay, including the Celestial Brush using the DS's touchscreen controls.

==== Unnamed Ōkami sequel ====
The closure of Clover Studio was partially predicated on Kamiya, Inaba, and Mikami's departures to form PlatinumGames in 2006. PlatinumGames brought in several of the Clover Studio team once it was disbanded by Capcom. Kamiya directed the Bayonetta series of action games while at PlatinumGames among other titles. While there, Kamiya said that he had ideas for Ōkami 2.

In October 2019, following on financially successful releases of Resident Evil and Monster Hunter games, Capcom indicated that it was looking to revive some of its "dormant" properties. Shortly after this announcement, Kamiya, along with Ikumi Nakamura, who had worked on Ōkami, stated on Twitter that "Ōkami is going to be back". In an interview in June 2020, she stated that she planned to approach Capcom about an Ōkami sequel, with the only insistence she planned to fight for was to make sure Kamiya took the leading role in the development.

An unnamed sequel was officially announced at The Game Awards 2024 in December 2024 with production to start shortly after that, with Capcom publishing. Kamiya will be directing the sequel at a new studio called Clovers, and will be supported by two other studios, M-Two (who had worked on Ōkami HD and remakes in the Resident Evil series) and Machine Head Works, both whom have several former Clover Studio members on staff. Kamiya had left PlatinumGames in October 2023 due to conflicts with Inaba; prior to leaving, another PlatinumGames employee, Kento Koyama, suggested he start his own studio. As Kamiya was under a one-year non-compete agreement preventing him from making new games, Koyama established Clovers with offices in Tokyo and Osaka, while Kamiya joined once the non-compete expired. Though initially Kamiya wanted to make new IP, he found support from Koyama and others to approach Capcom about making the Ōkami sequel once his non-compete had expired. Capcom producer Yoshiaki Hirabayashi said that Capcom had been considering a sequel for Ōkami for some time before the announcement, as the game has a consistent sales record rather than a dwindling tail, but required that certain key people in place to make the sequel occur; this including both Kamiya's involvement as well as the staff at Machine Head Works. Clovers was able to hire Hiroshi Yamaguchi, one of Okami's composers, along with composers Hitomi Kurokawa and Aoba Nakanishi, all whom had worked various Bayonetta and othe titles from PlatinumGames, along with sound designers Misaki Shindo and Hiroki Niwa.

The sequel will continue the story from the first game with Amaterasu, as Kamiya did not feel that her story was complete. The game will be built using Capcom's RE Engine, used in many of Capcom's first-party games since Resident Evil 7: Biohazard. Kamiya said that he was using lessons learned while at PlatinumGames, developing the sequels to Bayonetta, where there was a gap between what the studio wanted to do with the series and what the fan expectations were. Kamiya said, "So I don't necessarily mean to fight that with the new Ōkami game, but it's something that I'm trying to think more deeply about how to approach." As to avoid the problems with Bayonetta's sequels, which were designed with experienced players in mind, Kamiya said "I'm going back to think about the more inexperienced or relatively new players. I still want to make it enjoyable for them, too."

== Reception ==
=== Reviews ===
Reception

Aggregate score
Aggregator	Score
Metacritic	PS2: 93/100; Wii: 90/100; PS3: 90/100; PC: 92/100; PS4: 87/100; XONE: 87/100; NS: 89/100

Review scores
Publication	Score
1Up.com	PS2: A Wii: A
Eurogamer	PS2: 10/10; Wii: 10/10; PS3: 9/10
Game Informer	PS2: 9.5/10; Wii: 9.25/10
GameSpot	PS2: 9/10; Wii: 9/10
GameTrailers	PS2: 9.1/10 Wii: 9.2/10
IGN	PS2: 9.1/10; Wii: 9/10; PS3: 9.4/10
Nintendo Power	Wii: 7.5/10
PlayStation Official Magazine – UK	PS3: 8/10
X-Play	PS2: 5/5; Wii: 5/5

Ōkami received universal acclaim, with a score of 93/100 on Metacritic.

GameSpot gave it a 9 out of 10 and selected it as an Editor's Choice, citing that its "visual design instantly stands out, but it turns out to be just one of many inspired aspects of this impressive action adventure game". IGN gave the game a 9.1 out of 10, as being "beautiful, charismatic, engaging and one of the most original games you'll play anytime soon". Electronic Gaming Monthly's three reviewers gave it a 9, 9.5, and 9 out of 10, with one saying: "I'll be surprised if you can find a better game on any system this fall". Newtype USA named Ōkami its Game of the Month for October 2006, heralded the pacing as "nearly flawless" and proclaimed "Ōkami is that rarest of beasts: a game without any obvious flaws. Clover's creativity and attention to detail are on full display here. Shame on any gamer who passes up this divine adventure". Eurogamer scored the game 10/10 saying: "Right from the start it conjures an atmosphere of being something special, but to keep that level of quality up consistently over 60 hours ensures that this will be a game that will be talked about for years to come". In 2007, Ōkami was named eighteenth best PlayStation 2 game of all time in IGN's feature reflecting on the PlayStation 2's long lifespan. Famitsu gave the game a near perfect score of 39 out of 40, the 15th game to date to receive this score from the publication.

Conversely, the game was noted to have some flaws. The game was criticized for its uneven difficulty. Reviewers have noted some difficulty in getting the game to recognize the correct Celestial Brush patterns, as well as excessive amounts of dialog, particularly at the introduction, which was hampered by the use of computer-generated voices instead of voice acting.

The Wii version of Ōkami has received generally similar praise to the PlayStation 2 version, with GameSpot stating that the support for widescreen and the Wii controls "make it even more relevant today than it was in 2006". The use of the Wii Remote for the Celestial Brush was well received; in GameSpot's review, they noted that the Wii functionality with the Brush "improves the pace of the game". Other aspects to the controls were found to be weaker, particularly in combat. In their review, Nintendo Power recommended the PlayStation 2 version of the game over the Wii, stating that "though you can overcome the drawing and attacking issues with practice (and by sticking to whip-style weapons), it's a hurdle you shouldn't have to leap". The Wii version was given the Game of the Month award from IGN for April 2008. It was a nominee for multiple awards from IGN in its 2008 video game awards, including Best Artistic Design and Best Use of the Wii-Mote. In 2009, Official Nintendo Magazine ranked the game 33rd in a list of greatest Nintendo games.

The high-definition release on the PlayStation 3 was praised for being the "definitive" version of the game, with the rendering in 1080p helping to make the graphics style of the game stand out. Cam Shae of IGN did express some disappointment that the PlayStation 3 version does not attempt to address the "pop up" of far-off objects due to draw distance, a limitation of the PlayStation 2 version. Oli Welsh of Eurogamer considered that the game remains as relevant as it was when it was first released in 2006, being one of the few video games of the Zelda style.

The release of Ōkami HD for Windows, PlayStation 4, and Xbox One in 2017 was critically praised, establishing that the decade-old game still remained relevant. Julie Muncy for Wired said that while the game is somewhat long for a single-player experience, the game is "an underrated masterpiece, the kind of beautiful work that's critically acclaimed but forgotten all too quickly". Chris Schilling for PC Gamer also acknowledged that the game could be "languid to the point of lethargy" at times, but that Ōkami remained a "gorgeous and unforgettable adventure". Katherine Castle for Rock Paper Shotgun similarly said that some aspects of the game were plodding, but the game still remains beautiful with the improved graphics support, and that using a computer mouse for the Celestial Brush powers helps to make the game feel "reborn", giving the player more options to consider in combat. Polygon's Jeff Ramos considered this release the best example of a remaster, praising how well the game's art style and detail are rendered at the higher 4K resolutions.

=== Awards ===
Ōkami's initial showing at the 2005 E3 Convention garnered several awards and recognition, including 1UP's "Best PS2 Game", "Best Game of Show" (second place), and "Best Action Game" (third place); IGN's "Best PS2 Game of Show", and runner-up for "Best of Show" and "Most Innovative Design"; and X-Play's "Most Original Game". GameSpy recognized it as the fifth best game showing for the convention.

Upon release, Ōkami appeared as the "Game of the Month" for IGN, Electronic Gaming Monthly, and Game Informer. IGN, Edge Magazine and Game Revolution rated it as the best overall game of 2006, while GameTrailers and PSM named it best PS2 game for 2006. IGN further awarded the game the "Best Overall" and "PS2 Adventure Game", the "Best Overall" and "PS2 Artistic Design", the "Overall" and "PS2 Most Innovative Design", and the "Best Overall Story". GameSpot awarded the game for the "Best Artistic Graphics" for 2006. IGN named Ōkami 90th game of all time as of 2017. In 2010, GamePro ranked it as the fifth best game for the PlayStation 2. A 2023 poll conducted by GQ among a team of video game journalists across the industry listed Ōkami as the 94th best video game of all time.

Ōkami has won awards outside the mainstream gaming press. The game earned the "Best Character Design" and only one of three Innovation Awards at the 2007 Game Developers Choice Awards. Ōkami won the Grand Prize in the Entertainment Division of the 2006 Japan Media Arts Festival. On 13 August 2007, it was also awarded the best "Animation in a Game Engine", "Art Direction in a Game Engine", "Outstanding Original Adventure Game", and "Game of the Year" in the 2006 awards by the National Academy of Video Game Trade Reviewers (NAViGaTR). Ōkami was given an "Award for Excellence" from the Japanese Computer Entertainment Supplier's Association (CESA) at the Japan Game Awards 2007 and was later given 2009 CESA Developers Conference (CEDEC) award for "Visual Arts". The game was awarded the "Best Anthropomorphic Video Game" in the 2006 Ursa Major awards. It also won the 2007 BAFTA awards for "Artistic Achievement" and "Original Score". Ōkami also received Outstanding Platform Action/Adventure Game nominations At the 11th Satellite Awards.

The HD version was nominated for "Game, Classic Revival" at the 17th Annual NAViGaTR Awards.

=== Sales ===
More than 200,000 copies of Ōkami were sold in North America in 2006, grossing approximately US$8 million and ranking as the 100th best selling game of the year in the region. By March 2007, the total sales of the PlayStation 2 version were near 270,000. By comparison, 66,000 copies were sold in Japan for 2006. Kamiya said, in 2024, that these numbers made the game a "failure", which was part of the reasoning for the closure of Clover Studios. Though it was initially thought that poor sales of Ōkami and God Hand (another Clover game released in the same time frame) were the primary cause of the closure of Clover Studio, it was later revealed that three key developers within Capcom and Clover Studio, Shinji Mikami (Resident Evil series), Hideki Kamiya (Devil May Cry series), and Inaba, had left the company, and the studio was dissolved, such that "now all the resources should be used more effectively and more efficiently since they are centralized". The trio formed the video game development company "Seeds Inc", later merging with a company called "ODD" to become "PlatinumGames".

On 30 July 2008, Capcom revealed that approximately 280,000 copies of the Wii version of Ōkami had been sold in North America and Europe since its release date. The Wii version debuted in Japan with a modest 24,000 copies sold in its first week in the region. It was recognized as the sixth-bestselling game in Japan on 23 October 2009. Total sales for the game remained under 600,000 total units by March 2009, and was named the "least commercially successful winner of a game of the year award" in the 2010 version of the Guinness World Records Gamer's Edition. Subsequently, in 2018, the game was awarded the Guinness World Record for "Most critically acclaimed video game starring an animal character".

Ōkami HD on PlayStation 4 yielded 16,536 unit sales within its first week on sale in Japan, placing it at number 18 on the all format sales chart.

As of 31 March 2024, more than 2.40 million copies have been sold for the PlayStation 4, Xbox One, and Nintendo Switch, and as of 2020, 1.065 million copies of the Windows and PlayStation 3 versions, for a combined 3.365 million copies sold by June 2023. As of 30 June 2023, worldwide sales of the series reached 4 million copies.

=== Legacy ===
Ben Mattes, producer for the 2008 Prince of Persia video game, cited Ōkami, Ico, and Shadow of the Colossus as influences on the gameplay and artwork for the game. Capcom's Street Fighter IV is stated to have character designs influenced by Ōkami with hand-drawn images and brushstroke-like effects. The Disney video game Epic Mickey uses similar drawing aspects as Ōkami, allowing the player to draw and modify parts of levels to proceed. The final boss, Yami, appears as the main antagonist and final boss in the crossover fighting game Tatsunoko vs. Capcom. Amaterasu appears as a playable character in Marvel vs. Capcom 3: Fate of Two Worlds, Ultimate Marvel vs. Capcom 3 and Teppen. After Clover's dissolution and most of its staff's subsequent reformation as PlatinumGames, one of their next games, Bayonetta, contains several references to Ōkami; the most notable of these is when Bayonetta transforms into a panther and, like Amaterasu, a trail of flowers and plant life follows her. For the 2010 San Diego Comic-Con, Capcom raffled a limited run of T-shirts designed by Gerald de Jesus and iam8bit that placed Amaterasu, Shiranui, and Chibiterasu (from Ōkamiden) into a homage to the Three Wolf Moon t-shirt.

In 2009, GamesRadar included Ōkami among the games "with untapped franchise potential", commenting: "Seriously, if Nintendo can make the same Zelda game every few years, then why can't Capcom release Ōkami 2?". In 2015, Amaterasu was featured in Archie Comics' Worlds Unite crossover between its Sonic the Hedgehog comic lines and Mega Man series. An Ōkami costume was included in Monster Hunter Generations. Capcom submitted and got approval to publish an Amaterasu "courier" for Dota 2 just prior to the December 2017 release of Ōkami HD on Steam, with players that had pre-ordered or purchased Ōkami HD within the release period receiving the courier for free.

Capcom ran a celebratory event for Okami for the 20th anniversary of its release during April 2026.

== See also ==
- List of commercial failures in video games
